= 2017 Georgia Bulldogs football team =

American college football season

2017 Georgia Bulldogs football

SEC champion SEC East Division champion Rose Bowl champion

SEC Championship Game, W 28–7 vs. Auburn

Rose Bowl (CFP Semifinal), W 54–48 ^{2OT} vs. Oklahoma CFP National Championship, L 23–26 ^{OT} vs. Alabama
- Conference: Southeastern Conference
- Eastern Division

Ranking
- Coaches: No. 2
- AP: No. 2
- Record: 13–2 (7–1 SEC)
- Head coach: Kirby Smart (2nd season)
- Offensive coordinator: Jim Chaney (2nd season)
- Co-offensive coordinator: James Coley (2nd season)
- Offensive scheme: Pro-style
- Defensive coordinator: Mel Tucker (2nd season)
- Base defense: 3–4
- Home stadium: Sanford Stadium

2017 Southeastern Conference football standings
	Conf.			Overall
Team	W		L	W		L
Eastern Division
No. 2 Georgia x$^	7	–	1	13	–	2
South Carolina	5	–	3	9	–	4
Kentucky	4	–	4	7	–	6
Missouri	4	–	4	7	–	6
Florida	3	–	5	4	–	7
Vanderbilt	1	–	7	5	–	7
Tennessee	0	–	8	4	–	8
Western Division
No. 10 Auburn xy	7	–	1	10	–	4
No. 1 Alabama x#^	7	–	1	13	–	1
No. 18 LSU	6	–	2	9	–	4
No. 19 Mississippi State	4	–	4	9	–	4
Texas A&M	4	–	4	7	–	6
Ole Miss*	3	–	5	6	–	6
Arkansas	1	–	7	4	–	8
Championship: Georgia 28, Auburn 7
# – College Football Playoff champion; ^ – College Football Playoff participant; $ – Conference champion; x – Division champion/co-champions; y – Championship game participant; * Ole Miss ineligible for postseason due to NCAA sanctions; Rankings from AP Poll

The 2017 Georgia Bulldogs football team represented the University of Georgia in the 2017 NCAA Division I FBS football season. The Bulldogs played their home games at Sanford Stadium in Athens, Georgia and competed in the Eastern Division of the Southeastern Conference (SEC). They were led by second-year head coach Kirby Smart.

The Bulldogs notched their 800th win in program history with a 41–0 victory over Tennessee on September 30, 2017.

The 2017 Georgia Bulldogs were crowned Southeastern Conference Champions on December 2, 2017, with a postseason win over the Auburn Tigers, against whom they had suffered their only defeat in the regular season. This was their first conference title since 2005. After the win against Auburn, 2017 became only the fifth season in which Georgia beat all of its traditional rivals (Auburn, Florida, Georgia Tech, Tennessee) in the same season (previously 1980, 1981, 2011, 2012).

Georgia received its first ever College Football Playoff appearance against Oklahoma in the school's first Rose Bowl Game since the 1942 season. Georgia won by a score of 54–48 in double overtime. The Bulldogs reached the National Championship game for the first time since 1982, but lost to Alabama 26-23 in overtime.

== Coaching changes ==
Following the 2016 football season, defensive Line Coach Tracy Rocker was replaced by Tray Scott, who had coached at North Carolina from 2015 to 2016. Rocker was the defensive line Coach at Georgia from 2014 to 2016. He previously coached the Defensive line for the Tennessee Titans (2011–2013), Auburn (2009–2010), Ole Miss 2008, Arkansas (2003–2007), Cincinnati 2002, Troy State (1997–2001) & West Alabama (1994–1996). Scott was hired by Hugh Freeze at Ole Miss but stayed there less than 2 weeks before accepting the position from Kirby Smart at Georgia and leaving. Before his time with the North Carolina where they won the 2015 Coastal Division Championship and an 11–3 record, Scott was the Defensive Line Coach at UT Martin from 2013 to 2014. Scott is from Crossett, Arkansas where he played for Arkansas Tech from 2003 to 2007.

== Schedule ==
Georgia announced its 2017 football schedule on September 13, 2016. The 2017 schedule consisted of 6 home games, 5 away, and 1 neutral site game in the regular season. The Bulldogs hosted SEC foes Kentucky, Mississippi State, Missouri, and South Carolina, and traveled to Auburn, Tennessee, and Vanderbilt. Georgia faced Florida in Jacksonville, Florida.

The Bulldogs played four non–conference games, hosting Appalachian State from the Sun Belt Conference in the first meeting since 2013 and Samford from the Southern Conference. Georgia traveled to Georgia Tech from the Atlantic Coast Conference and independent Notre Dame in the first meeting since the 1981 Sugar Bowl. In their most recent matches, Georgia defeated Appalachian State 45–6 in 2013, Notre Dame 17–10 for the 1980 National Championship, and lost to Georgia Tech 28–27 at Sanford Stadium in 2016.

From the SEC West, Georgia played Mississippi State for the first time since 2011 when they beat Mississippi State 24–10 as well as Auburn in their annual Deep South's Oldest Rivalry, leading the series 57–55–8 after winning 3 straight times against Auburn including last year's win against #8 Auburn 13–7 in Sanford Stadium.

Date	Time	Opponent	Rank	Site	TV	Result	Attendance
September 2	6:15 p.m.	Appalachian State*	No. 15	Sanford Stadium; Athens, GA	ESPN	W 31–10	92,746
September 9	7:30 p.m.	at No. 24 Notre Dame*	No. 15	Notre Dame Stadium; South Bend, IN	NBC	W 20–19	77,622
September 16	7:30 p.m.	No. 17 (FCS) Samford*	No. 13	Sanford Stadium; Athens, GA	SECN	W 42–14	92,746
September 23	7:00 p.m.	No. 17 Mississippi State	No. 11	Sanford Stadium; Athens, GA	ESPN	W 31–3	92,746
September 30	3:30 p.m.	at Tennessee	No. 7	Neyland Stadium; Knoxville, TN (rivalry, SEC Nation)	CBS	W 41–0	102,455
October 7	12:00 p.m.	at Vanderbilt	No. 5	Vanderbilt Stadium; Nashville, TN (rivalry)	ESPN	W 45–14	36,282
October 14	7:30 p.m.	Missouri^{†}	No. 4	Sanford Stadium; Athens, GA (SEC Nation)	SECN	W 53–28	92,746
October 28	3:30 p.m.	vs. Florida	No. 3	EverBank Field; Jacksonville, FL (rivalry, SEC Nation)	CBS	W 42–7	84,107
November 4	3:30 p.m.	South Carolina	No. 1	Sanford Stadium; Athens, GA (rivalry)	CBS	W 24–10	92,746
November 11	3:30 p.m.	at No. 10 Auburn	No. 1	Jordan-Hare Stadium; Auburn, AL (Deep South's Oldest Rivalry, SEC Nation)	CBS	L 17–40	87,451
November 18	3:30 p.m.	Kentucky	No. 7	Sanford Stadium; Athens, GA (SEC Nation)	CBS	W 42–13	92,746
November 25	12:00 p.m.	at Georgia Tech*	No. 7	Bobby Dodd Stadium; Atlanta, GA (Clean, Old-Fashioned Hate)	ABC	W 38–7	55,000
December 2	4:00 p.m.	vs. No. 2 Auburn	No. 6	Mercedes-Benz Stadium; Atlanta, GA (SEC Championship Game, SEC Nation)	CBS	W 28–7	76,534
January 1, 2018	5:00 p.m.	vs. No. 2 Oklahoma*	No. 3	Rose Bowl; Pasadena, CA (Rose Bowl–CFP Semifinal, College GameDay)	ESPN	W 54–48 ^{2OT}	92,844
January 8, 2018	8:30 p.m.	vs. No. 4 Alabama	No. 3	Mercedes-Benz Stadium; Atlanta, GA (CFP National Championship, rivalry, College GameDay)	ESPN	L 23–26 ^{OT}	77,430
*Non-conference game; ^{†}Homecoming; Rankings from AP Poll and CFP Rankings after October 31 released prior to game; All times are in Eastern time

== Game summaries ==
=== Appalachian State ===
Appalachian State at No. 15 Georgia

Quarter	1	2	3	4	Total
Appalachian State	0	0	0	10	10
No. 15 Georgia	7	14	10	0	31

at Sanford Stadium • Athens, GA

- Date: September 2, 2017
- Game time: 6:20 p.m. EDT
- Game weather: Few clouds, 81 °F (27 °C)
- Game attendance: 92,746
- Referee: David Smith

Game information

First quarter

- UGA – Nick Chubb 1 yd run (Rodrigo Blankenship kick), 0:39. UGA 7–0.

Second quarter

- UGA – Javon Wims 34 yd pass from Jake Fromm (R. Blankenship kick), 10:40. UGA 14–0.
- UGA – Sony Michel 6 yd run (R. Blankenship kick), 6:56. UGA 21–0.

Third quarter

- UGA – R. Blankenship 23 yd field goal, 7:18. UGA 24–0.
- UGA – Nick Chubb 8 yd run (R. Blankenship kick), 1:32. UGA 31–0.

Fourth quarter

- APP – Taylor Lamb 20 yd run (Michael Rubino kick), 5:41. UGA 31–7.
- APP – Michael Rubino 43 yd field goal, 0:26. UGA 31–10.

Passing leaders

- UGA – Jake Fromm – 143 yards
- APP – Taylor Lamb – 128 yards

Rushing leaders

- UGA – Nick Chubb – 96 yards
- APP – Taylor Lamb – 66 yards

Receiving leaders

- UGA – Javon Wims – 81 yards
- APP – Jalin Moore – 34 yards

On September 2, 2017, Georgia faced Appalachian State University. Returning starting QB Jacob Eason suffered a knee injury early into the game, prompting true freshman QB Jake Fromm to enter. The freshman went 10 of 15 for 143 yards and a touchdown, and the defense kept the Mountaineers off the scoreboard for most of the game as the Bulldogs took care of business in Athens.

=== Notre Dame ===
No. 15 Georgia at No. 24 Notre Dame

Quarter	1	2	3	4	Total
No. 15 Georgia	3	7	7	3	20
No. 24 Notre Dame	3	10	3	3	19

at Notre Dame Stadium • Notre Dame, IN

- Date: September 9, 2017
- Game time: 7:44 p.m. EDT
- Game weather: Clear, 67 °F (19 °C)
- Game attendance: 77,622
- Referee: Matt Austin

Game information

First quarter

- ND – Justin Yoon 39 yd field goal, 12:48. ND 3–0.
- UGA – Rodrigo Blankenship 27 yd field goal, 6:36. Tied 3–3.

Second quarter

- ND – Brandon Wimbush 1 yd run (Yoon kick), 12:24. ND 10–3.
- UGA – Terry Godwin 5 yd pass from Jake Fromm (R. Blankenship kick), 6:45. Tied 10–10.
- ND – Justin Yoon 42 yd field goal, 4:14. ND 13–10.

Third quarter

- ND – Justin Yoon 37 yd field goal, 6:22. ND 16–10.
- UGA – Sony Michel 6 yd run (R. Blankenship kick), 4:34. UGA 17–16.

Fourth quarter

- ND – Justin Yoon 28 yd field goal, 10:21. ND 19–17.
- UGA – R. Blankenship 30 yd field goal, 3:34. UGA 20–19.

Passing leaders

- UGA – Jake Fromm – 141 yards
- ND – Brandon Wimbush – 210 yards

Rushing leaders

- UGA – Sony Michel – 73 yards
- ND – Josh Adams – 53 yards

Receiving leaders

- UGA – Terry Godwin – 36 yards
- ND – Josh Adams – 60 yards

Georgia traveled to Notre Dame for the first game between the two teams since the 1981 Sugar Bowl, which gave the No. 1 Bulldogs the 1980 National Championship. An estimated 70,000 Georgia fans traveled with the Bulldogs for the team's first trip north of the Mason–Dixon line in over 50 years. Notre Dame had just gained over 400 rushing yards in a blowout of Temple the week before, but Georgia's dominant front seven was able to hold Notre Dame's powerful rushing attack to just 55 yards in the victory. Rodrigo Blankenship kicked the game winning field goal late in the fourth quarter, and linebacker Lorenzo Carter recovered a fumble forced by Davin Bellamy on the ensuing drive to seal the game.

=== Samford ===
Samford at No. 13 Georgia

Quarter	1	2	3	4	Total
Samford	0	7	0	7	14
No. 13 Georgia	14	7	21	0	42

at Sanford Stadium • Athens, GA

- Date: September 16, 2017
- Game time: 7:39 p.m. EDT
- Game weather: Clear, 79 °F (26 °C)
- Game attendance: 92,746
- Referee: Lee Hedrick

Game information

First quarter

- UGA – Mecole Hardman 5 yd pass from Jake Fromm (Rodrigo Blankenship kick), 3:48. UGA 7–0.
- UGA – Nick Chubb 32 yd run (R. Blankenship kick), 1:45. UGA 14–0.

Second quarter

- UGA – Terry Godwin 51 yd pass from Jake Fromm (R. Blankenship kick), 10:32. UGA 21–0.
- SAM – T.D. Marshall 9 yd pass from Devlin Hodges (Jordan Weaver kick), 5:49. UGA 21–7.

Third quarter

- UGA – Nick Chubb 14 yd run (R. Blankenship kick), 12:19. UGA 28–7.
- UGA – Terry Godwin 9 yd pass from Jake Fromm (R. Blankenship kick), 8:33. UGA 35–7.
- UGA – D'Andre Swift 11 yd run (David Marvin kick), 1:27. UGA 42–7.

Fourth quarter

- SAM – Kelvin McKnight 18 yd pass from Devlin Hodges (Jordan Weaver kick), 13:49. UGA 42–14.

Passing leaders

- UGA – Jake Fromm – 165 yards
- SAM – Devlin Hodges – 227 yards

Rushing leaders

- UGA – Nick Chubb – 131 yards
- SAM – Justin Curry – 25 yards

Receiving leaders

- UGA – Terry Godwin – 98 yards
- SAM – Kelvin McKnight – 58 yards

Georgia dominated the Samford Bulldogs in Athens. Jake Fromm was efficient, going 8 of 13 for 165 yards and three touchdowns, and senior RB Nick Chubb gained 131 yards and two touchdowns on 16 carries.

=== Mississippi State ===
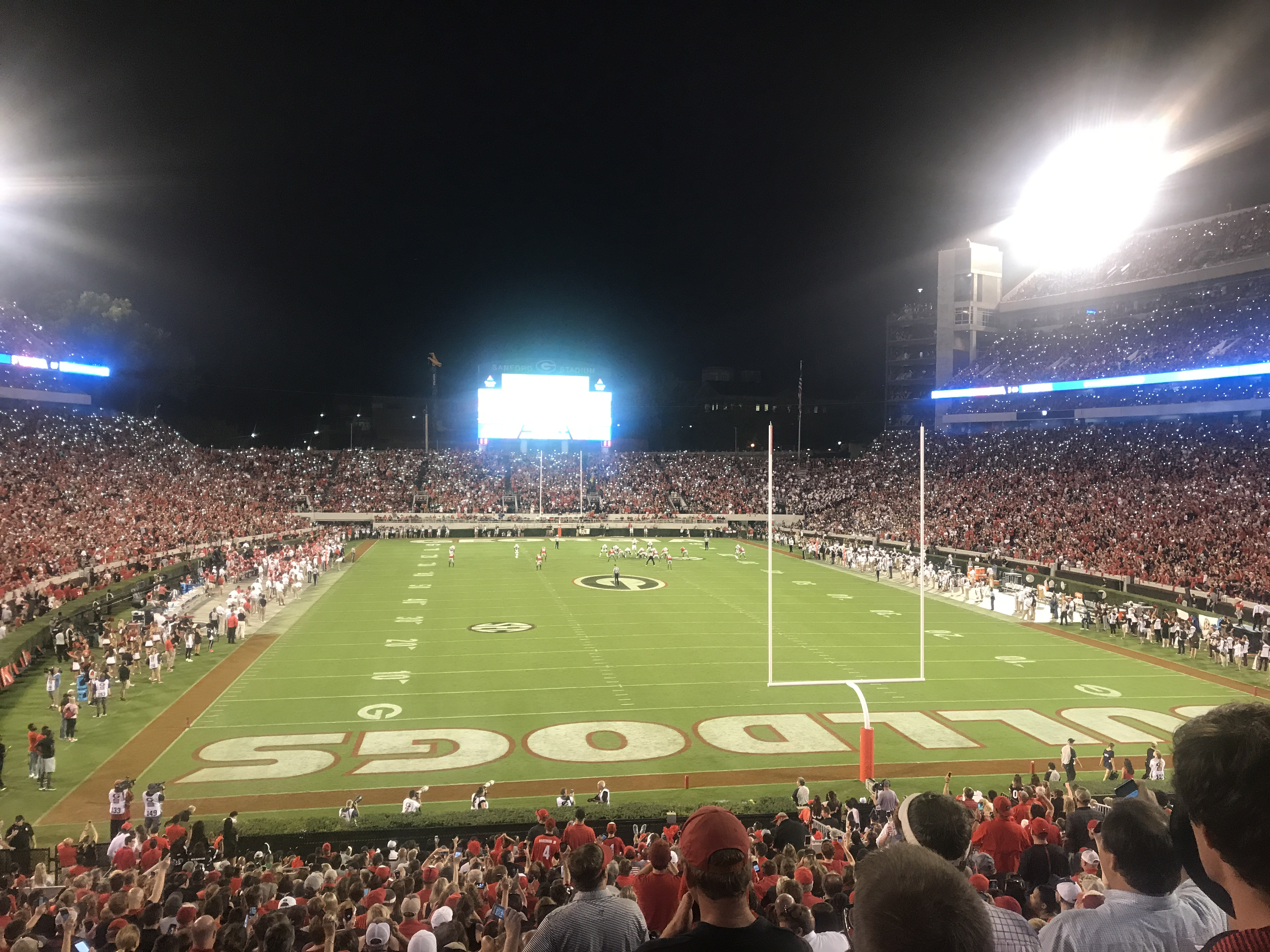
Georgia vs Mississippi State, September 23, 2017

No. 17 Mississippi State at No. 11 Georgia

Quarter	1	2	3	4	Total
No. 17 Mississippi State	0	3	0	0	3
No. 11 Georgia	14	0	17	0	31

at Sanford Stadium • Athens, GA

- Date: September 23, 2017
- Game time: 7:10 p.m. EDT
- Game weather: Partly cloudy, 79 °F (26 °C)
- Game attendance: 92,746
- Referee: Marc Curles

Game information

First quarter

- UGA – Terry Godwin 59 yd pass from Jake Fromm (Rodrigo Blankenship kick), 12:37. UGA 7–0.
- UGA – Nick Chubb 7 yd run (R. Blankenship kick), 6:16. UGA 14–0.

Second quarter

- MS – Jace Christmann 26 yd field goal, 1:14. UGA 14–3.

Third quarter

- UGA – Nick Chubb 28 yd run (R. Blankenship kick), 12:24. UGA 21–3.
- UGA – Isaac Nauta 41 yd pass from Jake from (R. Blankenship kick), 5:48. UGA 28–3.
- UGA – Rodrigo Blankenship 49 yd field goal, 0:52. UGA 31–3.

Passing leaders

- UGA – Jake Fromm – 201 yards
- MS – Nick Fitzgerald – 83 yards

Rushing leaders

- UGA – Nick Chubb – 81 yards
- MS – Nick Gibson – 52 yards

Receiving leaders

- UGA – Terry Godwin – 80 yards
- MS – Deddrick Thomas – 41 yards

Fresh off of three dominant victories in a row, including a 37–7 blowout of LSU, Mississippi State came into Athens as one of the hottest teams in the country. Georgia almost immediately took control, however, with a 59-yard touchdown pass from Jake Fromm to Terry Godwin on their first play from scrimmage. Fromm would go 9 of 12 for 201 yards and two touchdowns as Georgia's defense suffocated Mississippi State's offense in the home win.

=== Tennessee ===
No. 7 Georgia at Tennessee

Quarter	1	2	3	4	Total
No. 7 Georgia	10	14	7	10	41
Tennessee	0	0	0	0	0

at Neyland Stadium • Knoxville, TN

- Date: September 30, 2017
- Game time: 3:39 p.m. EDT
- Game weather: Partly sunny, 77 °F (25 °C)
- Game attendance: 102,455
- Referee: Hubert Owens

Game information

First quarter

- UGA – Rodrigo Blankenship 38 yd field goal, 13:37. UGA 3–0.
- UGA – Javon Wims 12 yd pass from Jake Fromm (R. Blankenship kick), 6:10. UGA 10–0.

Second quarter

- UGA – Jake Fromm 9 yd run (R. Blankenship kick), 7:13. UGA 17–0.
- UGA – Jake Fromm 4 yd run (R. Blankenship kick), 4:14. UGA 24–0.

Third quarter

- UGA – Sony Michel 21 yd run (R. Blankenship kick), 1:04. UGA 31–0.

Fourth quarter

- UGA – Brian Herrien 1 yd run (R. Blankenship kick), 12:00. UGA 38–0.
- UGA – David Martin 19 yd field goal, 5:34. UGA 41–0.

Passing leaders

- UGA – Jake Fromm – 84 yards
- UT – Quinten Dormady – 64 yards

Rushing leaders

- UGA – Nick Chubb – 109 yards
- UT – John Kelly – 44 yards

Receiving leaders

- UGA – Terry Godwin – 43 yards
- UT – John Kelly – 47 yards

Georgia traveled to Knoxville in search of payback for a heartbreaking loss the year before. The result was a 41–0 shutout of the Volunteers, their first shutout since 1994 and their worst home loss in over a century. Jake Fromm accounted for three total touchdowns while the Georgia defense held Tennessee to just 142 yards of offense. This was Georgia's largest margin of victory against the rival Volunteers since the 1981 season, when Georgia won 44–0.

=== Vanderbilt ===
No. 5 Georgia at Vanderbilt

Quarter	1	2	3	4	Total
No. 5 Georgia	7	14	17	7	45
Vanderbilt	0	7	0	7	14

at Vanderbilt Stadium • Nashville, TN

- Date: October 7, 2017
- Game time: 11:02 a.m. CDT
- Game weather: Cloudy, 76 °F (24 °C)
- Game attendance: 32,282
- Referee: Lee Hedrick

Game information

First quarter

- UGA – Nick Chubb 33 yd run (Rodrigo Blankenship kick), 7:53. UGA 7–0.

Second quarter

- UGA – D'Andre Swift 5 yd pass from Jake Fromm (R. Blankenship kick), 13:08. UGA 14–0.
- UGA – Nick Chubb 14 yd run (R. Blankenship kick), 1:58. UGA 21–0.
- VANDY – Ralph Webb 1 yd run (T. Openshaw kick), 0:28. UGA 21–7.

Third quarter

- UGA – Terry Godwin 47 yd pass from Jake Fromm (R. Blankenship kick), 13:14. UGA 28–7.
- UGA – Sony Michel 50 yd run (R. Blankenship kick), 10:17. UGA 35–7.
- UGA – Rodrigo Blankenship 27 yd field goal, 3:34. UGA 38–7.

Fourth quarter

- UGA – Elijah Holyfield 15 yd run (R. Blankenship kick), 13:50. UGA 45–7.
- VANDY – C.J. Duncan 3 yd pass from Kyle Shurmur (T. Oppenshaw kick), 9:08. UGA 45–14.

Passing leaders

- UGA – Jake Fromm – 102 yards
- VANDY – Kyle Shurmur – 172 yards

Rushing leaders

- UGA – Sony Michel – 150 yards
- VANDY – Ralph Webb – 47 yards

Receiving leaders

- UGA – Terry Godwin – 70 yards
- VANDY – Kalija Lipscomb – 55 yards

For the second week in a row, Georgia traveled to an opposing SEC stadium to avenge a loss from the year before. This time, Georgia blew out Vanderbilt in Nashville. Georgia's running backs had a field day as Nick Chubb and Sony Michel combined for nearly 300 yards and three touchdowns, and the team gained a total of 423 rushing yards in the blowout win.

=== Missouri ===
Missouri at No. 4 Georgia

Quarter	1	2	3	4	Total
Missouri	14	7	0	7	28
No. 4 Georgia	14	20	13	6	53

at Sanford Stadium • Athens, GA

- Date: October 14, 2017
- Game time: 7:39 p.m. EDT
- Game weather: Fair, 69 °F (21 °C)
- Game attendance: 92,746
- Referee: Matt Loeffler

Game information

First quarter

- UGA – Mecole Hardman 35 yd run (Rodrigo Blankenship kick), 10:30. UGA 7–0.
- MU – Albert Okwuegbunam 4 yd pass from Drew Lock (T. McCann kick), 6:50. Tied 7–7.
- UGA – Riley Ridley 19 yd pass from Jake Fromm (R. Blankenship kick), 3:16. UGA 14–7.
- MU – Emanuel Hall 63 yd pass from Drew Lock (T. McCann kick), 0:34. Tied 14–14.

Second quarter

- UGA – Sony Michel 36 yd run (R. Blankenship kick), 13:24. UGA 21–14.
- MU – Emanuel Hall 63 pass from Drew Lock (T. McCann kick), 11:34. Tied 21–21.
- UGA – Rodrigo Blankenship 37 yd kick, 7:01. UGA 24–21.
- UGA – Jake Fromm 4 yd run (R. Blankenship kick), 3:53. UGA 31–21.
- UGA – Rodrigo Blankenship 43 yd kick, 0:00. UGA 34–21.

Third quarter

- UGA – Rodrigo Blankenship 29 yd kick, 10:49. UGA 37–21.
- UGA – Rodrigo Blankenship 27 yd kick, 8:26. UGA 40–21.
- UGA – Sony Michel 16 yd run (R. Blankenship kick), 6:05. UGA 47–21.

Fourth quarter

- MU – Jason Reese 27 yd pass from Drew Lock (T. McCann kick), 12:19. UGA 47–28.
- UGA – Mecole Hardman 59 yd pass from Jake Fromm, 10:27. UGA 53–28.

Passing leaders

- UGA – Jake Fromm – 326 yards
- MU – Drew Lock – 253 yards

Rushing leaders

- UGA – D'Andre Swift – 94 yards
- MU – Damarea Crockett – 32 yards

Receiving leaders

- UGA – Javon Wims – 95 yards
- MU – Emanuel Hall – 141 yards

The game started out surprisingly close thanks to the strong arm of Drew Lock as Missouri was able to match Georgia score-for-score into the second quarter. Georgia began to pull away by halftime, however, as the Bulldogs gained 696 total yards in the victory, the second-most in school history.

=== Florida ===
No. 3 Georgia vs. Florida

Quarter	1	2	3	4	Total
No. 3 Georgia	21	0	14	7	42
Florida	0	0	0	7	7

at EverBank Field • Jacksonville, FL

- Date: October 28, 2017
- Game time: 3:40 p.m. EDT
- Game weather: Cloudy, 79 °F (26 °C)
- Game attendance: 84,107
- Referee: James Carter

Game information

First quarter

- UGA – Nick Chubb 6 yd run (Rodrigo Blankenship kick), 11:34. UGA 7–0.
- UGA – Javon Wims 17 yd pass from Jake Fromm (R. Blankenship kick), 9:12. UGA 14–0.
- UGA – Sony Michel 74 yd run (R. Blankenship kick), 7:32. UGA 21–0.

Third quarter

- UGA – Sony Michel 45 yd run (R. Blankenship kick), 6:43. UGA 28–0.
- UGA – J.R. Reed 3 yd fumble recovery (R. Blankenship kick), 5:21. UGA 35–0.

Fourth quarter

- UGA – Elijah Holyfield 39 yd run (R. Blankenship kick), 11:22. UGA 42–0.
- UF – Mark Thompson 1 yd run (E. Pineiro kick), 2:42. UGA 42–7.

Passing leaders

- UGA – Jake Fromm – 101 yards
- UF – Malik Zaire – 36 yards

Rushing leaders

- UGA – Sony Michel – 137 yards
- UF – La'Mical Perine – 93 yards

Receiving leaders

- UGA – D'Andre Swift – 84 yards
- UF – Freddie Swain – 17 yards

Georgia broke its three-game losing streak to Florida with a dominant performance in Jacksonville, their best win in the series since 1982. Senior RB Sony Michel had one of the best games of his career, rushing for 137 yards and two touchdowns on a mere 6 carries, and the Georgia defense dominated once again. Florida's defeat in this game sealed the fate of the Gators' Head Coach Jim McElwain, who was fired within a few days of the crushing loss.

=== South Carolina ===
South Carolina at No. 1 Georgia

Quarter	1	2	3	4	Total
South Carolina	0	7	3	0	10
No. 1 Georgia	7	7	7	3	24

at Sanford Stadium • Athens, GA

- Date: November 4, 2017
- Game time: 3:39 p.m. EDT
- Game weather: Sunny, 77 °F (25 °C)
- Game attendance: 92,746
- Referee: Ken Williamson

Game information

First quarter

- UGA – Sony Michel 8 yd run (Rodrigo Blankenship kick), 2:21. UGA 7–0.

Second quarter

- SC – Bryan Edwards 12 yd pass from Jake Bentley (P. White kick), 14:07. Tied 7–7.
- UGA – Javon Wims 10 yd pass from Jake Fromm (R. Blankenship kick), 4:40. UGA 14–7.

Third quarter

- UGA – Mecole Hardman 20 yd pass from Jake Fromm (R. Blankenship kick), 9:28. UGA 21–7.
- SC – Parker White 25 yd field goal, 3:36. UGA 21–10.

Fourth quarter

- UGA – Rodrigo Blankenship 20 yd field goal, 6:36. UGA 24–10.

Passing leaders

- UGA – Jake Fromm – 196 yards
- SC – Jake Bentley – 227 yards

Rushing leaders

- UGA – Nick Chubb – 102 yards
- SC – A.J. Turner – 35 yards

Receiving leaders

- UGA – Terry Godwin – 53 yards
- SC – Hayden Hurst – 93 yards

Ranked No. 1 in the College Football Playoff Poll for the first time ever, and for the first time in any poll since the beginning of the 2008 season, Georgia defeated South Carolina in Athens behind a balanced offensive attack. Jake Fromm completed 16 of 22 passes for 196 yards and two touchdowns, while the duo of Sony Michel and Nick Chubb combined for 183 yards. The win, combined with a Kentucky loss on the same day, clinched the SEC East for Georgia.

=== Auburn ===
No. 1 Georgia at No. 10 Auburn

Quarter	1	2	3	4	Total
No. 1 Georgia	7	0	3	7	17
No. 10 Auburn	6	10	14	10	40

at Jordan–Hare Stadium • Auburn, AL

- Date: November 11, 2017
- Game time: 2:46 p.m. EST
- Game weather: Cloudy, 55 °F (13 °C)
- Game attendance: 87,451
- Referee: Matt Austin

Game information

First quarter

- UGA – Nick Chubb 1 yd run (Rodrigo Blankenship kick), 11:21. UGA 7–0.
- AU – Daniel Carlson 54 yd field goal, 8:19. UGA 7–3.
- AU – Daniel Carlson 37 yd field goal, 1:20. UGA 7–6.

Second quarter

- AU – Daniel Carlson 30 yd field goal, 12:03. AU 9–7.
- AU – Darius Slayton 42 yd pass from Jarrett Stidham (D. Carlson kick), 4:09. AU 16–7.

Third quarter

- AU – Jarrett Stidham 7 yd run (D. Carlson kick), 11:57. AU 23–7.
- AU – Ryan Davis 32 yd pass from Jarrett Stidham (D. Carlson kick), 8:12. AU 30–7.
- UGA – Rodrigo Blankenship 47 yd field goal, 5:23. AU 30–10.

Fourth quarter

- AU – Daniel Carlson 37 yd field goal, 10:06. AU 33–10.
- AU – Kerryon Johnson 55 yd pass from Jarrett Stidham (D. Carlson kick), 6:13. AU 40–10.
- UGA – Riley Ridley 14 yd pass from Jake Fromm (R. Blankenship kick), 2:19. AU 40–17.

Passing leaders

- UGA – Jake Fromm – 184 yards
- AU – Jarrett Stidham – 214 yards

Rushing leaders

- UGA – Nick Chubb – 27 yards
- AU – Kerryon Johnson – 167 yards

Receiving leaders

- UGA – Javon Wims – 96 yards
- AU – Kerryon Johnson – 66 yards

The No. 10 Auburn Tigers ended a three-game losing streak against the Bulldogs as they dominated No. 1 Georgia at home. Georgia scored a quick touchdown on their first drive but struggled to touch the scoreboard for the remainder of the game. Auburn took advantage of huge special teams blunders by Georgia and held Nick Chubb and Sony Michel to a combined 48 yards on the ground. Auburn RB Kerryon Johnson shredded the Georgia defense for 233 total yards in the blowout victory.

=== Kentucky ===
Kentucky at No. 7 Georgia

Quarter	1	2	3	4	Total
Kentucky	6	0	7	0	13
No. 7 Georgia	7	14	7	14	42

at Sanford Stadium • Athens, GA

- Date: November 18, 2017
- Game time: 3:45 p.m. EST
- Game weather: Cloudy, 68 °F (20 °C)
- Game attendance: 92,746
- Referee: Hubert Owens

Game information

First quarter

- UK – Austin MacGinnis 37 yd field goal, 9:40. UK 3–0.
- UGA – Nick Chubb 8 yd run (Rodrigo Blankenship kick), 3:19. UGA 7–3.
- UK – Austin MacGinnis 35 field goal, 0:11. UGA 7–6.

Second quarter

- UGA – Javon Wims 27 yd pass from Jake Fromm (R. Blankenship kick), 4:56. UGA 14–6.
- UGA – Sony Michel 37 yd run (R. Blankenship kick), 1:51. UGA 21–6.

Third quarter

- UK – Benny Snell 1 yd run (A. MacGinnis kick), 11:29. UGA 21–13.
- UGA – Sony Michel 8 yd run (R. Blankenship kick), 8:16. UGA 28–13.

Fourth quarter

- UGA – Nick Cubb 55 yd run (R. Blankenship kick), 14:17. UGA 35–13.
- UGA – Sony Michel 4 yd run (R. Blankenship kick), 10:59. UGA 42–13.

Passing leaders

- UGA – Jake Fromm – 123 yards
- UK – Stephen Johnson – 138 yards

Rushing leaders

- UGA – Nick Chubb – 151 yards
- UK – Benny Snell – 94 yards

Receiving leaders

- UGA – Javon Wims – 83 yards
- UK – Blake Bone – 45 yards

Georgia bounced back from their crushing loss to Auburn with a dominant home win over Kentucky. Sony Michel and Nick Chubb had a huge day on the ground, combining for 238 rushing yards and five touchdowns, and the Georgia defense held Kentucky's physical offense to 124 yards on the ground.

=== Georgia Tech ===
No. 7 Georgia at Georgia Tech (Clean, Old-Fashioned Hate)

Quarter	1	2	3	4	Total
No. 7 Georgia	7	10	14	7	38
Georgia Tech	0	7	0	0	7

at Bobby Dodd Stadium • Atlanta, GA

- Date: November 25, 2017
- Game time: 12:06 p.m. EST
- Game weather: Mostly cloudy, 58 °F (14 °C)
- Game attendance: 55,000
- Referee: Jeff Flanagan

Game information

First quarter

- UGA – Nick Chubb 1 yd run (Rodrigo Blankenship kick), 5:51. UGA 7–0.

Second quarter

- UGA – Javon Wims 21 yd pass from Jake Fromm (R. Blankenship kick), 7:05. UGA 14–0.
- GT – Ricky Jeune 10 yd pass from TaQuon Marshall (B. King kick), 0:48. UGA 14–7.
- UGA – Rodrigo Blankenship 37 yd field goal, 0:00. UGA 17–7.

Third quarter

- UGA – Sony Michel 4 yd run (R. Blankenship kick), 9:03. UGA 24–7.
- UGA – D'Andre Swift 2 yd run (R. Blankenship kick), 1:23. UGA 31–7.

Fourth quarter

- UGA – Ahkil Crumpton 78 yd pass from Jake Fromm (R. Blankenship kick), 11:21. UGA 38–7.

Passing leaders

- UGA – Jake Fromm – 224 yards
- GT – TaQuon Marshall – 38 yards

Rushing leaders

- UGA – Sony Michel – 85 yards
- GT – TaQuon Marshall – 72 yards

Receiving leaders

- UGA – Ahkil Crumpton – 78 yards
- GT – Ricky Jeune – 38 yards

The No. 7 Bulldogs avenged their final loss of the previous season with a blowout win over Georgia Tech in Atlanta. Jake Fromm was a very efficient 12 of 16 for 224 yards and two touchdowns, while Georgia's running backs added 247 yards and three touchdowns in the win. The Georgia defense was strong, holding Georgia Tech to a season-low 226 yards of total offense

=== Auburn (SEC Championship Game) ===
No. 6 Georgia vs. No. 4 Auburn (SEC Championship Game)

Quarter	1	2	3	4	Total
No. 6 Georgia	0	10	3	15	28
No. 4 Auburn	7	0	0	0	7

at Mercedes-Benz Stadium • Atlanta, GA

- Date: December 2, 2017
- Game time: 4:12 p.m. EST
- Game weather: Indoors
- Game attendance: 76,534
- Referee: John McDaid

Game information

First quarter

- AU – Nate Craig-Myers 6 yd pass from Jarrett Stidham (Daniel Carlson kick), 9:54. AU 7–0.

Second quarter

- UGA – Isaac Nauta 2 yd pass from Jake Fromm (Rodrigo Blankenship kick), 10:14. Tied 7–7.
- UGA – Rodrigo Blankenship 27 yd field goal, 4:59. UGA 10–7.

Third quarter

- UGA – Rodrigo Blankenship 35 yd field goal, 1:26. UGA 13–7.

Fourth quarter

- UGA – Terry Godwin 7 yd pass from Jake Fromm (2pt conversion: Terry Godwin pass from Jake Fromm), 13:06. UGA 21–7.
- UGA – D'Andre Swift 64 yd run (R. Blankenship kick), 10:34. UGA 28–7.

Passing leaders

- UGA – Jake Fromm – 183 yards
- AU – Jarrett Stidham – 145 yards

Rushing leaders

- UGA – D'Andre Swift – 88 yards
- AU – Kerryon Johnson – 44 yards

Receiving leaders

- UGA – Mecole Hardman – 67 yards
- AU – Ryan Davis – 65 yards

After losing a terribly one-sided game to Auburn in the regular season, No. 6 Georgia had a chance to redeem themselves with a rematch against No. 2 Auburn in the SEC Championship game. Auburn started off strong, going 75 yards on 10 plays for a touchdown on their first drive. However, in a complete reversal of the regular season game, Auburn was unable to score from there on out. Georgia grabbed the momentum after recovering an Auburn fumble at the beginning of the second quarter, and the Bulldogs would go on to score 28 unanswered points in a blowout victory. This time, the Georgia defense held a banged-up Kerryon Johnson to just 45 total yards, while Sony Michel and Nick Chubb each had over 80 total yards of their own. True freshman QB Jake Fromm played well in the biggest game of his career, going 16 of 22 for 183 yards and two touchdowns. Another true freshman, D'Andre Swift, all but assured Georgia's victory with a 64-yard 4th quarter touchdown run to put the Bulldogs up by three scores. The win gave Georgia its first SEC title since 2005 and secured a spot for Georgia in the 2018 College Football Playoff.

=== Oklahoma (Rose Bowl–CFP Semifinal) ===
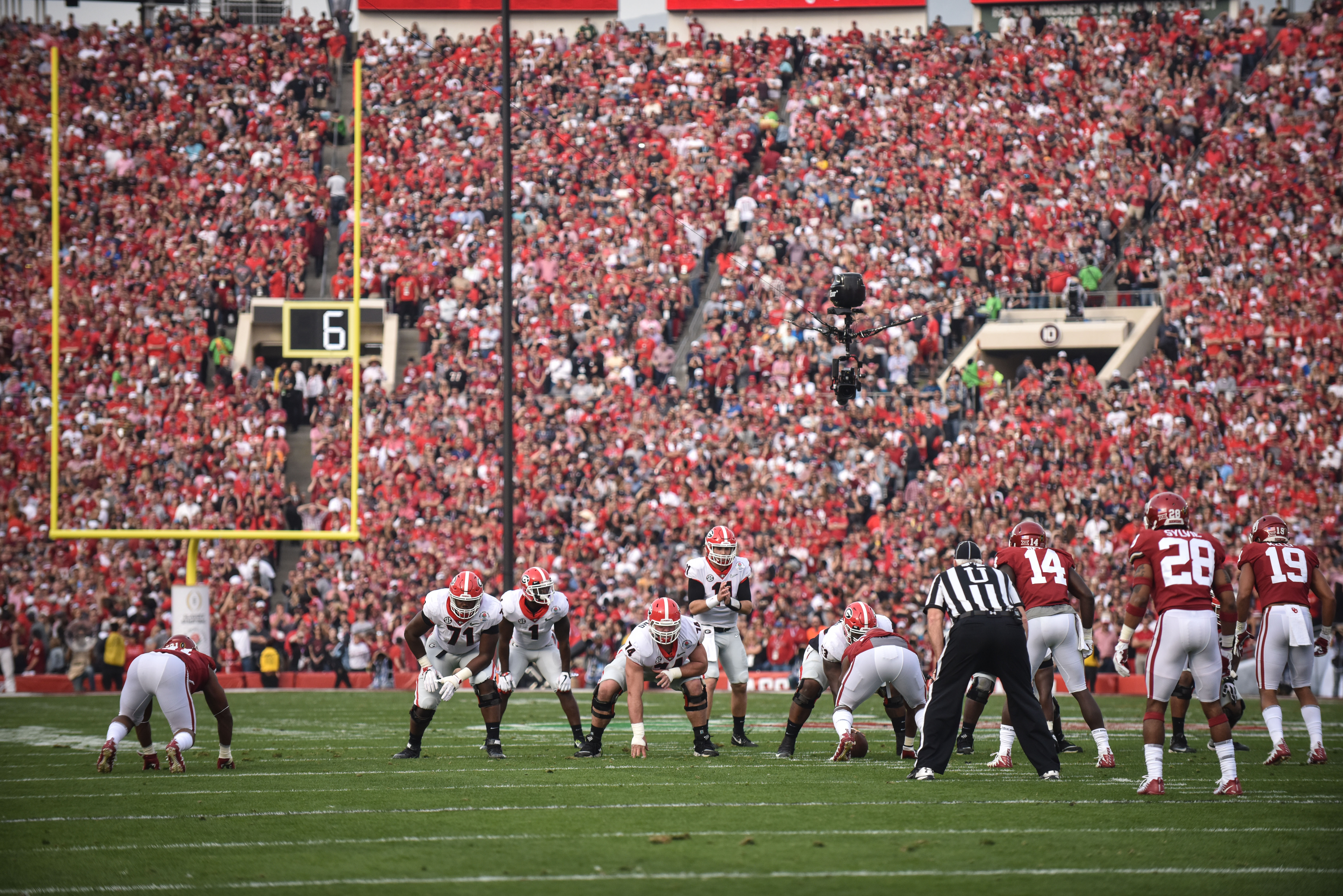
The 2018 Rose Bowl, January 1, 2018

No. 3 Georgia vs. No. 2 Oklahoma (Rose Bowl–CFP Semifinal)

Quarter	1	2	3	4	OT	2OT	Total
No. 3 Georgia	7	10	14	14	3	6	54
No. 2 Oklahoma	14	17	0	14	3	0	48

at Rose Bowl • Pasadena, CA

- Date: January 1, 2018
- Game time: 2:12 p.m. PST
- Game weather: Sunny, 71 °F (22 °C)
- Game attendance: 92,844
- Referee: Jeff Heaser

Game information

First quarter

- OU – Marquise Brown 13 yd pass from Baker Mayfield (A. Seibert kick), 11:31. OU 7–0.
- UGA – Sony Michel 13 yd pass from Jake Fromm (Rodrigo Blankenship kick), 8:27. Tied 7–7.
- OU – Rodney Anderson 9 yd run (A. Seibert kick), 6:56. OU 14–7.

Second quarter

- OU – Rodney Anderson 41 yd run (A. Seibert kick), 14:12. OU 21–7.
- UGA – Sony Michel 75 yd run (R. Blankenship kick), 14:00. OU 21–14.
- OU – Austin Seibert 38 yd field goal, 9:12. OU 24–14.
- OU – Baker Mayfield 2 yd pass from CeeDee Lamb (A. Seibert kick), 0:06. OU 31–14.
- UGA – Rodrigo Blankenship 55 yd field goal, 0:00. OU 31–17.

Third quarter

- UGA – Nick Chubb 50 yd run (R. Blankenship kick), 12:25. OU 31–24.
- UGA – Sony Michel 38 yd run (R. Blankenship kick), 0:41. Tied 31–31.

Fourth quarter

- UGA – Javon Wims 4 yd pass from Jake Fromm (R. Blankenship kick), 13:57. UGA 38–31.
- OU – Dimitri Flowers 11 yd pass from Baker Mayfield (A. Seibert kick), 8:47. Tied 38–38.
- OU – Steven Parker 46 yd fumble recovery (A. Seibert kick), 6:52. OU 45–38.
- UGA – Nick Chubb 2 yd run (R. Blankenship kick), 0:52. Tied 45–45.

First overtime

- UGA – Rodrigo Blankenship 38 yd field goal. UGA 48–45.
- OU – Austin Seibert 33 yd field goal. Tied 48–48.

Second overtime

- UGA – Sony Michel 27 yd run. UGA 54–48.

Passing leaders

- UGA – Jake Fromm – 210 yards
- OU – Baker Mayfield – 287 yards

Rushing leaders

- UGA – Sony Michel – 181 yards
- OU – Rodney Anderson – 201 yards

Receiving leaders

- UGA – Javon Wims – 73 yards
- OU – Marquise Brown – 114 yards

On January 1, 2018, Georgia defeated Oklahoma 54–48 in a College Football Playoff semifinal game played at the Rose Bowl in Pasadena, California. Oklahoma led by 14 points at halftime, but Georgia used a strong running game to storm back in the second half. The game was tied at 45 at the end of regulation time. After the teams traded field goals in the first overtime period, Georgia prevailed on a 27-yard Sony Michel touchdown run in double overtime following an Oklahoma field goal attempt blocked by Lorenzo Carter. The senior duo of Chubb and Michel combined for 367 total yards and 6 touchdowns in the highest-scoring Rose Bowl of all time.

=== Alabama (CFP National Championship Game) ===
No. 4 Alabama vs. No. 3 Georgia (CFP National Championship Game)

Quarter	1	2	3	4	OT	Total
No. 4 Alabama	0	0	10	10	6	26
No. 3 Georgia	0	13	7	0	3	23

at Mercedes-Benz Stadium • Atlanta, GA

- Date: January 8, 2018
- Game time: 8:19 p.m. EST
- Game weather: Indoors
- Game attendance: 77,430
- Referee: Dan Capron

Game information

Second quarter

- UGA – Rodrigo Blankenship 41 yd field goal, 14:14. UGA 3–0.
- UGA – Rodrigo Blankenship 27 yd field goal, 7:33. UGA 6–0.
- UGA – Mecole Hardman 1 yd run (R. Blankenship kick), 0:07. UGA 13–0.

Third quarter

- UA – Henry Ruggs 6 yd pass from Tua Tagovailoa (A. Pappanastos kick), 8:52. UGA 13–7.
- UGA – Mecole Hardman 80 yd pass from Jake Fromm (R. Blankenship kick), 6:52. UGA 20–7.
- UA – Andy Pappanastos 43 yd field goal, 5:15. UGA 20–10.

Fourth quarter

- UA – Andy Pappanastos 30 yd field goal, 9:24. UGA 20–13.
- UA – Calvin Ridley 7 yd pass from Tua Tagovailoa (A. Pappanastos kick), 3:49. Tied 20–20.

Overtime

- UGA – Rodrigo Blankenship 51 yd field goal. UGA 23–20.
- UA – DeVonta Smith 41 yd pass from Tua Tagovailoa. UA 26–23.

Passing leaders

- UGA – Jake Fromm – 232 yards
- UA – Tua Tagovailoa – 166 yards

Rushing leaders

- UGA – Sony Michel – 98 yards
- UA – Najee Harris – 64 yards

Receiving leaders

- UGA – Riley Ridley – 82 yards
- UA – DeVonta Smith – 41 yards

Georgia charged out to a 13–0 half time lead. Alabama coach Nick Saban made a gutsy call at the half to change QBs, going with freshman Tua Tagovailoa. Alabama chipped away at the Georgia lead in the second half eventually scoring the game tying TD on a 4th and goal from the 6 yard line late in the contest. Alabama had a chance to win it in regulation but missed a short field goal and the game was sent to OT. Georgia kicker Rodrigo Blankenship hit a 51-yard field goal, setting a National Championship game record to give the Bulldogs a 3-point lead in OT. On Alabama's OT possession they scored a TD on second down that won the game and gave Alabama their 5th National Championship under Nick Saban.

== Roster ==
2017 Georgia Bulldogs football team roster
Players
Coaches
Offense

Pos.	#	Name	Class
RB	1	Sony Michel	Sr
WR	2	Jayson Stanley	Jr
WR	3	Tyler Simmons	So
WR	4	Mecole Hardman	So
QB	4	Sam Vaughn	Jr
WR	5	Terry Godwin	Jr
WR	6	Javon Wims	Sr
RB	7	D'Andre Swift	Fr
WR	8	Riley Ridley	So
WR	9	Jeremiah Holloman	Fr
QB	10	Jacob Eason	So
QB	11	Jake Fromm	Fr
QB	12	Brice Ramsey	Sr
RB	13	Elijah Holyfield	So
WR	14	Trey Blount	Fr
WR	15	Matt Landers	Fr
WR	16	Ahkil Crumpton	Jr
QB	16	John Seter	Fr
WR	17	Josh Moran	Fr
TE	18	Isaac Nauta	So
WR	19	Willie Erdman	Fr
QB	22	Stetson Bennett	Fr
WR	23	Caleeb Roberson	Fr
RB	24	Prather Hudson	Fr
WR	25	Steven Van Tiflin	Jr
WR	26	Patrick Burke	Fr
RB	27	Nick Chubb	Sr
RB	29	Lofton Tidwell	Fr
WR	30	Ed Ferguson	Fr
RB	33	Ian Donald-McIntyre	Fr
RB	35	Brian Herrien	So
FB	43	Nick Moore	Jr
FB	46	Frank Sinkwich IV	Fr
FB	47	Christian Payne	Sr
FB	49	Turner Fortin	So
OL	53	Lamont Gaillard	Jr
OL	54	Justin Shaffer	Fr
FB	55	Jacob Gross	Sr
OL	55	Dyshon Sims	Sr
OL	57	Daniel Gothard	Fr
OL	58	Pat Allen	So
OL	60	Allen Williams	Fr
OL	61	Chris Barnes	Fr
OL	65	Kendall Baker	Jr
OL	66	Solomon Kindley	Fr
OL	67	Sam Madden	So
OL	68	Sean Fogarty	Jr
OL	70	Aulden Bynum	Sr
OL	71	Andrew Thomas	Fr
OL	72	Netori Johnson	Fr
OL	74	Ben Cleveland	Fr
OL	75	Thomas Swilley	Sr
OL	76	Carson Hall	Sr
OL	77	Isaiah Wynn	Sr
OL	78	D'Marcus Hayes	Jr
OL	79	Isaiah Wilson	Fr
WR	80	J. T. Dooley	Fr
WR	82	Michael Chigbu	Jr
TE	83	Jeb Blazevich	Sr
WR	84	Wyatt Payne	So
TE	85	Jordan Davis	Sr
TE	86	Wix Patton	Fr
TE	87	Miles McGinty	Sr
TE	88	Jackson Harris	Jr
TE	89	Charlie Woerner	So

Defense

Pos.	#	Name	Class
DB	2	Richard LeCounte	Fr
LB	3	Roquan Smith	Jr
DL	5	Julian Rochester	So
LB	6	Natrez Patrick	Jr
LB	7	Lorenzo Carter	Sr
DB	8	DeAngelo Gibbs	Fr
DB	9	Ameer Speed	Fr
DL	10	Malik Herring	Fr
LB	11	Keyon Richardson	Jr
DB	12	Tray Bishop	Fr
DL	13	Jonathan Ledbetter	Jr
DB	14	Malkom Parrish	Sr
LB	15	D'Andre Walker	Jr
LB	17	Davin Bellamy	Sr
DB	18	Deandre Baker	Jr
DB	19	Jarvis Wilson	Jr
DB	20	J. R. Reed	So
LB	22	Nate McBride	Fr
DB	23	Mark Webb	Fr
DB	24	Dominick Sanders	Sr
LB	25	Jaleel Laguins	So
DB	26	Tyrique McGhee	So
DB	28	KJ Smith	So
DB	29	Tim Hill	Sr
LB	30	Tae Crowder	So
DB	31	William Poole	Fr
LB	32	Monty Rice	Fr
LB	33	Robert Beal Jr.	Fr
DB	35	Aaron Davis	Sr
DB	36	Latavious Brini	Fr
DB	37	Jordon McKinney	Fr
LB	38	Michael Keene	Fr
LB	39	Rashad Roundtree	Jr
DB	41	Eric Stokes	Fr
DB	42	Jake Skole	Fr
DB	43	Isaac Mize	Jr
LB	44	Juwan Taylor	Jr
LB	45	Reggie Carter	Sr
DB	46	Andrew Wing	Fr
LB	47	Daniel Harper	Sr
DL	49	Koby Pyrz	Fr
LB	51	David Marshall	So
DL	52	Tyler Clark	So
DL	57	Alex Essex	Sr
DL	76	Michail Carter	So
DL	78	Trenton Thompson	Jr
LB	84	Walter Grant	Fr
LB	88	Jaden Hunter	Fr
DL	91	Kolby Wyatt	Fr
DL	92	Justin Young	So
DL	94	Michael Barnett	So
DL	96	DaQuan Hawkins-Muckle	Jr
DL	97	John Atkins	Sr

Special teams

Pos.	#	Name	Class
LS	56	John Courson	Sr
LS	59	Matthew Herzwurm	Sr
LS	69	Trent Frix	Sr
K	91	David Marvin	Sr
P	92	Cameron Nizialek	Sr
P	93	Bill Rubright	Fr
P	95	Marshall Long	So
K	97	Brooks Buce	Fr
P	97	Will Cowart	Jr
K	98	Rodrigo Blankenship	So

Head coach

- Kirby Smart

Coordinators/assistant coaches

- Jim Chaney – Offensive Coordinator/Tight Ends
- Mel Tucker – Defensive Coordinator/Secondary
- James Coley — Co-Offensive Coordinator/Quarterbacks
- Scott Fountain – Special Teams Coordinator
- Dell McGee – Assistant Head Coach/Running Backs
- Cortez Hankton– Wide Receivers
- Tray Scott – Defensive Line
- Sam Pittman – Offensive Line
- Glenn Schumann – Inside Linebackers
- Kevin Sherrer– Outside Linebackers
- Scott Sinclair – Director, Strength and Conditioning
- Ed Ellis – Associate Director of Strength and Conditioning
- Rodney Price – Assistant, Strength and Conditioning
- Ben Sowders – Assistant, Strength and Conditioning
- Patrick Doherty – Quality Control, Offense
- Brian Michalowski – Quality Control, Defense
- Blaine Miller – Quality Control, Defense
- Tyson Summers – Quality Control, Defense
- Will Windham — Quality Control, Defense
- Josh Lee – Director of Football Operations
- Jay Chapman – Assistant Director of Football Operations
- Neyland Raper – Football Operations Assistant
- Brian Vogler – Football Operations Assistant
- Jonas Jennings – Director, Player Development
- Luke Moore – Director, Player Personnel
- Bakari Guice – Player Relations Coordinator
- Marshall Malchow – Director, Recruiting
- Lukman Abdulai – Director, Recruiting on Campus
- Christina Harris – Director, Recruiting Administration
- Bryant Gantt – Director, Player Wellness
- John Meshad – Director, Player Equipment
- Sidney Roberts – Director, Football Performance Nutrition
- William Price – Assistant Director of Football Performance Nutrition
- Travares Tillman – Graduate Assistant
- Greg Meyer – Special Teams Analyst
- Eric Black – Recruiting Video Production Coordinator
- Hannah Brinks – Football Graphic Design Coordinator
- Clark Williams – Assistant Video Coordinator

Legend

- (C) Team captain
- (S) Suspended
- (I) Ineligible
- Injured
- Redshirt

Roster
Last update: 10/25/18

== Rankings ==
Ranking movements Legend: ██ Increase in ranking ██ Decrease in ranking ( ) = First-place votes
	Week															
Poll	Pre	1	2	3	4	5	6	7	8	9	10	11	12	13	14	Final
AP	15	15	13	11	7	5	4	3	3	2 (2)	2 (5)	7	7	6	3	2
Coaches	15	15	13	12	8	6	5	3	3	2	2 (1)	7	7	6	3 (2)	2
CFP	Not released									1	1	7	7	6	3	Not released

== Awards and honors ==
Weekly Awards
Player	Award	Date
Lorenzo Carter	SEC Defensive Player of the Week	September 9, 2017
Jake Fromm	SEC Freshman of the Week	September 23, 2017
Nick Chubb	SEC Co-Offensive Player of the Week	September 30, 2017
Isaiah Wynn	SEC Offensive Lineman of the Week	October 7, 2017
Jake Fromm	SEC Freshman of the Week	October 14, 2017
J. R. Reed	SEC Co-Defensive Player of the Week	October 28, 2017
Nick Chubb	SEC Offensive Player of the Week	November 18, 2017
Jake Fromm	SEC Freshman of the Week	November 25, 2017

Individual Awards
Player/coach	Award
Roquan Smith	Butkus Award; SEC Defensive Player of the Year; Bednarik Award finalist Bronko Nagurski Award finalist
Kirby Smart	SEC Coach of the Year; AP Coach of the Year finalist
Jake Fromm	SEC Freshman Player of the Year

All-American
Player	AP	AFCA	FWAA	TSN	WCFF	Designation
Roquan Smith	1	1	1	1	1	Unanimous
Isaiah Wynn	2	2				None
Nick Chubb		2				None
The NCAA recognizes a selection to all five of the AP, AFCA, FWAA, TSN and WCFF first teams for unanimous selections and three of five for consensus selections.

All-SEC
Player	Position	Media	Coaches
Isaiah Wynn	OT	1	1
Roquan Smith	LB	1	1
Nick Chubb	RB	2	1
Lorenzo Carter	LB	2	2
Deandre Baker	CB	–	2
J. R. Reed	S	2	–

== 2018 NFL draft ==
The 2018 NFL draft was held on April 26–28 in Arlington, Texas. Six Georgia players were selected as part of the draft, and another five were signed to NFL teams as undrafted free agents.

Player	Position	Round	Overall pick	NFL team
Roquan Smith	LB	1	8	Chicago Bears
Isaiah Wynn	OT	1	23	New England Patriots
Sony Michel	RB	1	31	New England Patriots
Nick Chubb	RB	2	35	Cleveland Browns
Lorenzo Carter	LB	3	66	New York Giants
Javon Wims	WR	7	224	Chicago Bears
John Atkins	DT	Undrafted		New England Patriots
Trenton Thompson	DL	Undrafted		Cleveland Browns
Davin Bellamy	DB	Undrafted		Houston Texans
Aaron Davis	CB	Undrafted		New York Giants
David Martin	K	Undrafted		Atlanta Falcons
