= 2017 All-SEC football team =

American college football all-star team

The 2017 All-SEC football team consists of American football players selected to the All-Southeastern Conference (SEC) chosen by the Associated Press (AP) and the conference coaches for the 2017 Southeastern Conference football season.

Georgia won the conference, in a rematch, beating Auburn 28–7 in the SEC Championship.

Auburn running back Kerryon Johnson was voted the AP SEC Offensive Player of the Year. Georgia linebacker Roquan Smith was voted the AP SEC Defensive Player of the Year.

== Offensive selections ==
=== Quarterbacks ===
- Drew Lock, Missouri (AP-1, Coaches-1)
- Jarrett Stidham, Auburn (AP-2, Coaches-2)

=== Running backs ===
- Kerryon Johnson, Auburn (AP-1, Coaches-1)
- Benny Snell, Kentucky (AP-1, Coaches-2)
- Nick Chubb, Georgia (AP-2, Coaches-1)
- Derrius Guice, LSU (AP-2, Coaches-2)

=== Wide receivers ===
- A. J. Brown, Ole Miss (AP-1, Coaches-1)
- Calvin Ridley, Alabama (AP-1, Coaches-1)
- J'Mon Moore, Missouri (AP-2, Coaches-2)
- Christian Kirk, Texas A&M (AP-2, Coaches-2)

=== Centers ===
- Will Clapp, LSU (AP-1, Coaches-1)
- Bradley Bozeman, Alabama (AP-1, Coaches-2)
- Frank Ragnow, Arkansas (AP-2)

=== Guards ===
- Braden Smith, Auburn (AP-1, Coaches-1)
- Ross Pierschbacher, Alabama (AP-1)
- Greg Little, Ole Miss (AP-2, Coaches-2)
- Trey Smith, Tennessee (AP-2, Coaches-2)
- Garrett Brumfield, LSU (Coaches-2)

=== Tackles ===
- Jonah Williams, Alabama (AP-1, Coaches-1)
- Isaiah Wynn, Georgia (AP-1, Coaches-1)
- Martinas Rankin, Miss St (AP-2, Coaches-1)
- Martez Ivey, Florida (AP-2, Coaches-2)

=== Tight ends ===
- Hayden Hurst, South Carolina (AP-1, Coaches-1)
- Albert Okwuegbunam, Missouri (AP-2, Coaches-2)

== Defensive selections ==
=== Defensive ends ===
- Jeff Holland, Auburn (AP-1, Coaches-1)
- Montez Sweat, Miss St (AP-1, Coaches-1)
- Marcell Frazier, Missouri (AP-2, Coaches-2)
- Marquis Haynes, Ole Miss (AP-2, Coaches-2)
- Dante Sawyer, South Carolina (AP-2)
- Da'Shawn Hand, Alabama (Coaches-2)

=== Defensive tackles ===
- Jeffery Simmons, Miss St (AP-1, Coaches-1)
- Daron Payne, Alabama (AP-1, Coaches-2)
- Raekwon Davis, Alabama (AP-2, Coaches-1)
- Taven Bryan, Florida (AP-2)
- Breeland Speaks, Ole Miss (AP-2)

=== Linebackers ===
- Roquan Smith, Georgia (AP-1, Coaches-1)
- Devin White, LSU (AP-1, Coaches-1)
- Rashaan Evans, Alabama (AP-1, Coaches-2)
- Skai Moore, South Carolina (AP-2, Coaches-1)
- Arden Key, LSU (AP-1)
- Lorenzo Carter, Georgia (AP-2, Coaches-2)
- Josh Allen, Kentucky (AP-2)
- De'Jon Harris, Arkansas (AP-2)
- Charles Wright, Vanderbilt (AP-2)
- Tre Williams, Auburn (Coaches-2)

=== Cornerbacks ===
- Armani Watts, Texas A&M (AP-1, Coaches-1)
- Andraez Williams, LSU (AP-1, Coaches-2)
- Duke Dawson, Florida (AP-2, Coaches-1)
- Carlton Davis, Auburn (AP-2, Coaches-1)
- C. J. Henderson, Florida (AP-2)
- Levi Wallace, Alabama (AP-2)
- Donte Jackson, LSU (Coaches-2)
- Deandre Baker, Georgia (Coaches-2)

=== Safeties ===
- Minkah Fitzpatrick, Alabama (AP-1, Coaches-1)
- Ronnie Harrison, Alabama (AP-1, Coaches-2)
- J. R. Reed, Georgia (AP-2)

== Special teams ==
=== Kickers ===
- Daniel Carlson, Auburn (AP-1, Coaches-1)
- Eddy Piñeiro, Florida (AP-2, Coaches-2)

=== Punters ===
- Johnny Townsend, Florida (AP-1, Coaches-2)
- J. K. Scott, Alabama (AP-2, Coaches-1)

=== All purpose/return specialist ===
- Christian Kirk, Texas A&M (AP-1, Coaches-1)
- A. J. Brown, Ole Miss (Coaches-2)
- Mecole Hardman, Georgia (AP-2)
- D. J. Chark, LSU (AP-2, Coaches-2)

== Key ==
Bold = Consensus first-team selection by both the coaches and AP

AP = Associated Press

Coaches = Selected by the SEC coaches

== See also ==
- 2017 Southeastern Conference football season
- 2017 College Football All-America Team
