= Jake Fromm =

American football player (born 1998)

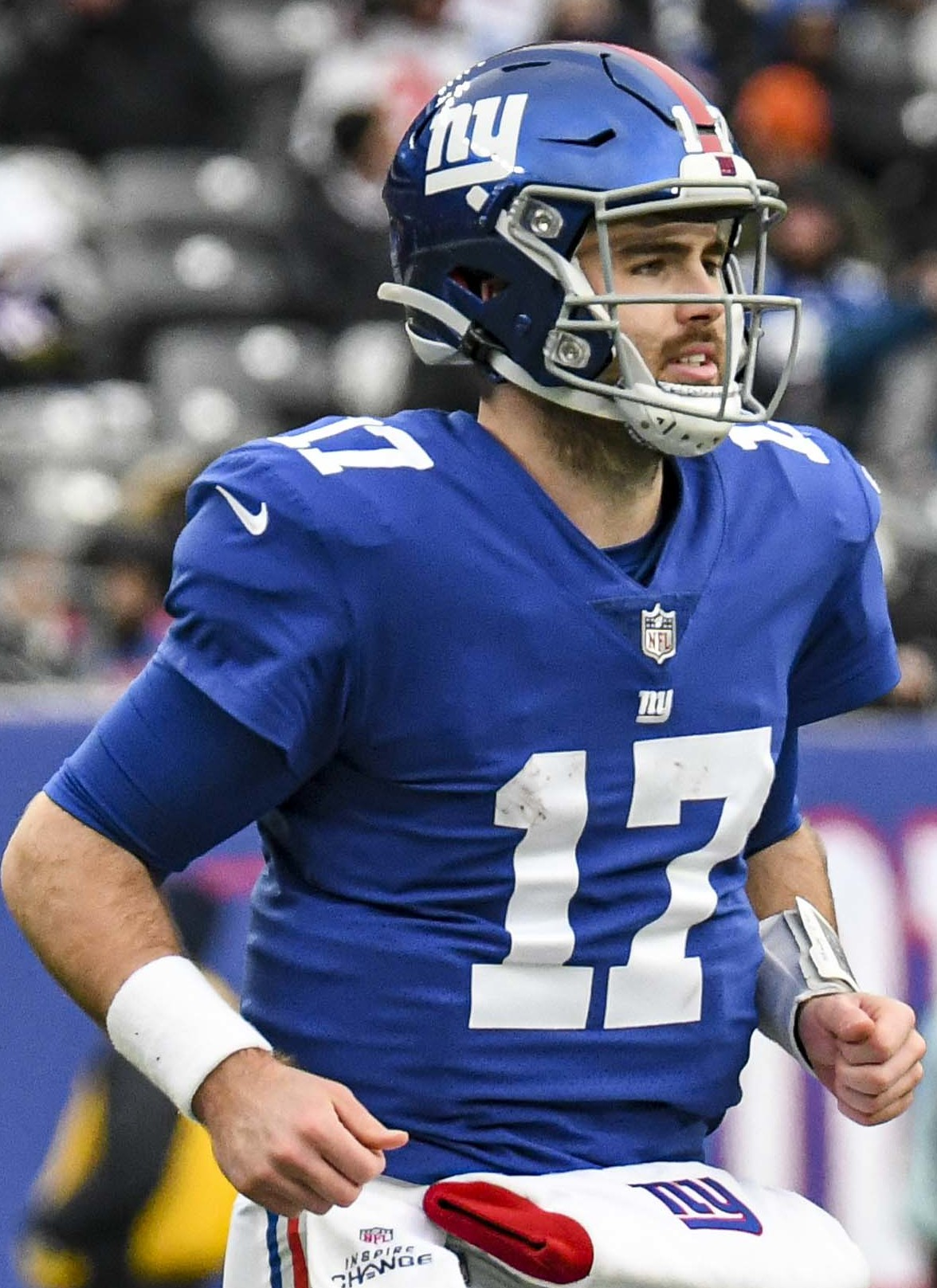
- Fromm with the New York Giants in 2022

No. 4, 17, 18
- Position: Quarterback

Personal information
- Born: July 30, 1998 (age 28); Warner Robins, Georgia, U.S.
- Listed height: 6 ft 2 in (1.88 m)
- Listed weight: 215 lb (98 kg)

Career information
- High school: Houston County (Warner Robins)
- College: Georgia (2017–2019)
- NFL draft: 2020: 5th round, 167th overall pick

Career history
- Buffalo Bills (2020–2021); New York Giants (2021); Washington Commanders (2022–2023); Detroit Lions (2024)*
- * Offseason or practice squad member only

Awards and highlights
- SEC Freshman of the Year (2017); Freshman All-American (2017)

Career NFL statistics
- Passing attempts: 60
- Passing completions: 27
- Completion percentage: 45.0%
- TD–INT: 1–3
- Passing yards: 210
- Passer rating: 38.9
- Stats at Pro Football Reference

William Jacob Fromm (born July 30, 1998) is an American former professional football player who was a quarterback in the National Football League (NFL). He played college football for the Georgia Bulldogs and was selected by the Buffalo Bills in the fifth round of the 2020 NFL draft. Fromm was also a member of the New York Giants and Washington Commanders.

== Early life ==
Fromm was born on July 30, 1998, in Warner Robins, Georgia. In his early years, Fromm played baseball with his local Warner Robins team, which came within two games of the 2011 Little League World Series championship game. During the LLWS, Fromm at times would play in front of crowds larger than 25,000. Fromm later attended Houston County High School. During his career he had 12,745 passing yards and 117 touchdowns. He was rated as a four-star recruit by Rivals.com and Scout.com.

Fromm originally committed to play college football at the University of Alabama but changed his commitment to the University of Georgia. Fromm's senior year was discussed in the web-series QB1: Beyond the Lights.

== College career ==
Fromm entered his true freshman year at Georgia in 2017 as the backup to Jacob Eason. In the first game of the season, after Eason suffered an injury, Fromm replaced him and completed 10 of 15 passes for 143 yards and a touchdown against Appalachian State. Fromm was then named the starter for the team's next game against Notre Dame. Fromm threw for 141 yards and a touchdown. In the next game, the Bulldogs defeated Samford with a 42–14 win. After a win against Vanderbilt, Fromm played his best game against Missouri. He threw for 326 yards and completed 18 of 26 passes. This performance led the Bulldogs to be the third-ranked team in the nation. After a 42–7 win vs Florida, the Bulldogs became No. 1 after Penn State lost. Fromm and the Bulldogs would eventually go on to win the 2017 Southeastern Conference (SEC) Championship against Auburn. He was named SEC co-newcomer of the year by the Associated Press. He led Georgia to a 54–48 victory over Oklahoma in double overtime in the Rose Bowl on January 1, 2018, to earn them a spot in the CFP final against Alabama. Fromm and the Bulldogs went on to lose to Alabama in the College Football National Championship, 26–23. Fromm threw for 232 yards, a touchdown and two interceptions, while completing 16 of 32 passes.

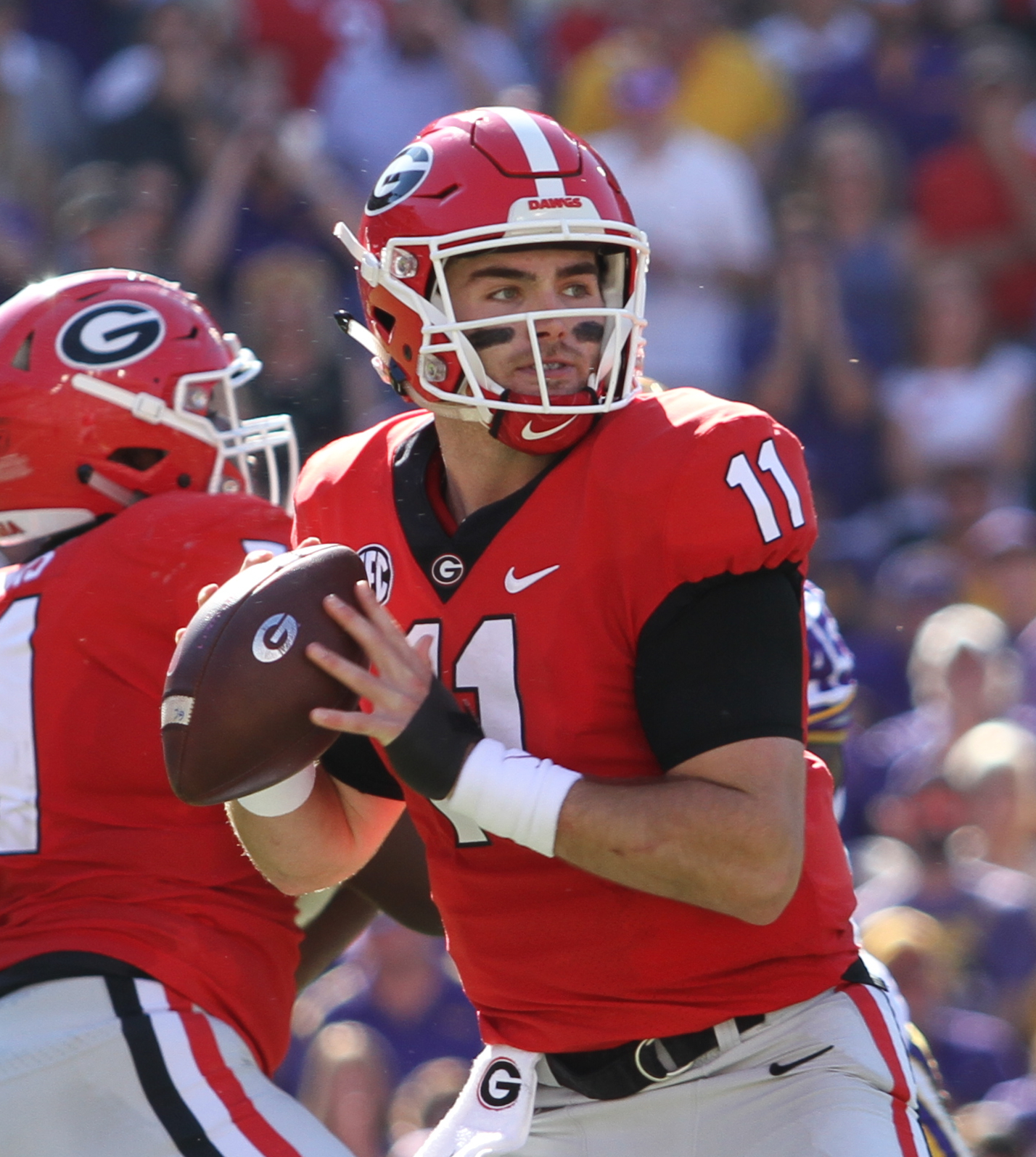
Fromm at Georgia in 2018

In the 2018 season, Fromm helped lead Georgia to an 11–3 record, albeit with losses to Alabama in the SEC Championship and Texas in the Sugar Bowl. He passed for 2,749 passing yards, 30 touchdowns, and six interceptions.

In the 2019 season, Fromm once again led Georgia to the SEC Championship, where they lost to LSU. He finished his college career with a victory over Baylor in the Sugar Bowl.

On January 8, 2020, Fromm announced his intention to skip his senior season at Georgia; he had already declared for the 2020 NFL draft.

== Professional career ==
Pre-draft measurables
Height	Weight	Arm length	Hand span	Wingspan	40-yard dash	10-yard split	20-yard split	20-yard shuttle	Three-cone drill	Vertical jump	Broad jump	Wonderlic
6 ft 1 7/8 in (1.88 m)	219 lb (99 kg)	31 1/8 in (0.79 m)	8 7/8 in (0.23 m)	6 ft 3 in (1.91 m)	5.01 s	1.68 s	2.96 s	4.51 s	7.27 s	30.0 in (0.76 m)	9 ft 3 in (2.82 m)	35
All values from NFL Combine

=== Buffalo Bills ===
The Buffalo Bills drafted Fromm in the fifth round with the 167th overall pick of the 2020 NFL Draft.

Fromm signed a four-year, $3.771 million contract, including a $302,960 signing bonus, with the Bills on May 7, 2020.

During his rookie season, Fromm was isolated from the rest of the Bills quarterback room to ensure that the team would still have a quarterback to play in the event Josh Allen, Matt Barkley and Davis Webb were all placed on the reserve/COVID-19 list at the same time.

On August 31, 2021, Fromm was released from the Bills and re-signed to the practice squad the next day.

=== New York Giants ===
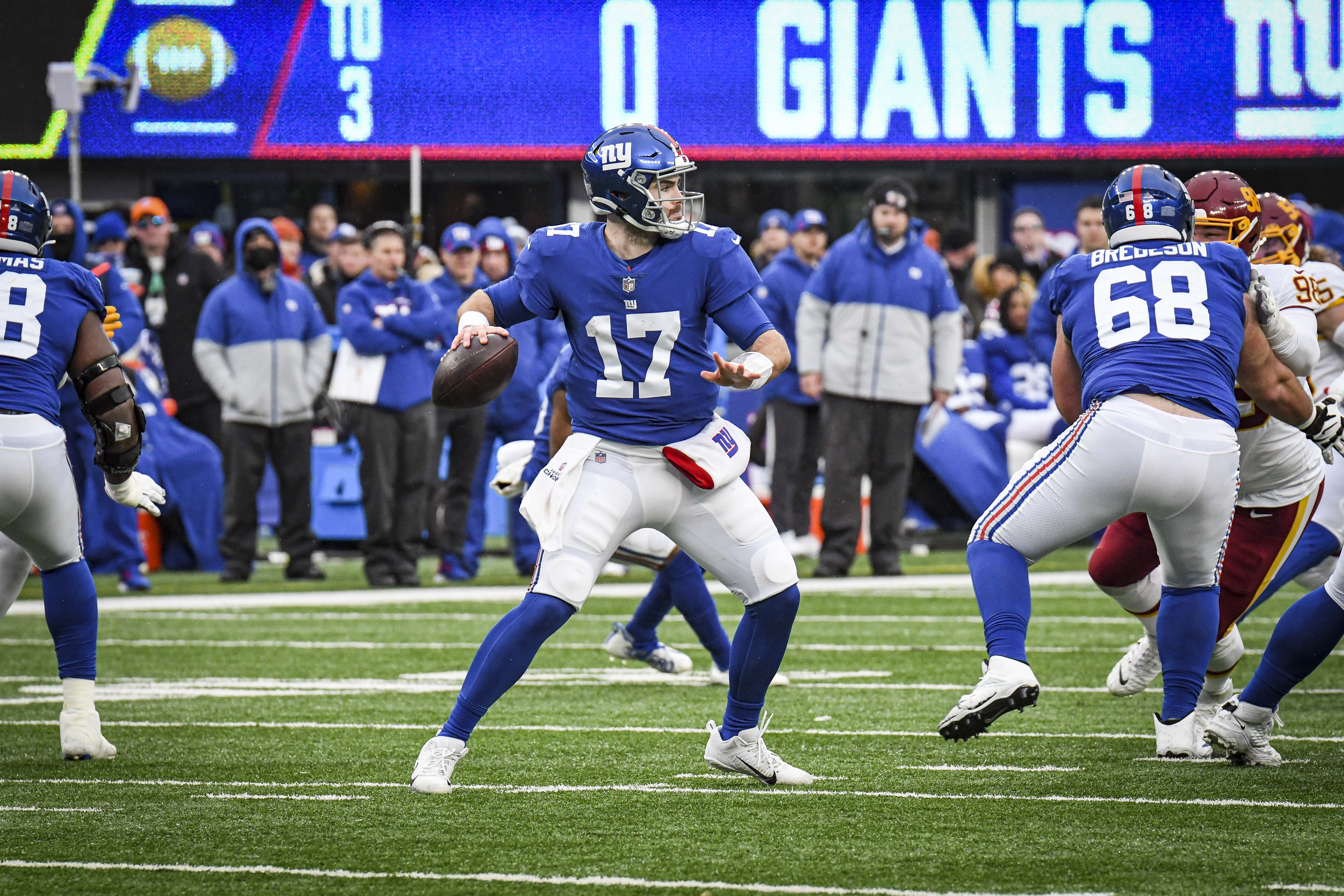
Fromm with the New York Giants in 2022

On November 30, 2021, Fromm was signed by the New York Giants from the Bills practice squad. This was after an injury to starting quarterback Daniel Jones. He replaced interim starter Mike Glennon in the fourth quarter against the Dallas Cowboys on December 19. Fromm got his first career start in Week 16 game against the Philadelphia Eagles, throwing for 25 yards in 17 attempts with one interception. He finished the season with 27 completions for 210 yards, a touchdown, and three interceptions. On March 16, 2022, Fromm was non-tendered by the Giants, making him a free agent.

=== Washington Commanders ===
Fromm signed with the Washington Commanders' practice squad on October 18, 2022. He signed a reserve/future contract on January 9, 2023. On August 29, Fromm was waived by the Commanders and re-signed to the practice squad. He was signed to the active roster on December 30 after starting quarterback Jacoby Brissett was injured. Fromm was released by Washington on May 14, 2024.

=== Detroit Lions ===
Fromm signed with the Detroit Lions on August 12, 2024. He was released during final roster cuts on August 27, and was re-signed onto the practice squad the following day.

Fromm signed a reserve/future contract with the Lions on January 20, 2025. On April 23, Fromm was released by the Lions.

== Career statistics ==
College statistics
Year	Team	Games			Passing								Rushing			
Year	Team	GP	GS	Record	Comp	Att	Pct	Yards	Avg	TD	Int	Rate	Att	Yards	Avg	TD
2017	Georgia	15	14	12−2	181	291	62.2	2,615	9.0	24	7	160.1	55	79	1.4	3
2018	Georgia	14	14	11−3	207	307	67.4	2,761	9.0	30	6	171.3	41	-27	-0.7	0
2019	Georgia	14	14	12−2	234	385	60.8	2,870	7.4	24	5	141.2	38	-12	-0.3	0
Career		43	42	35−7	622	983	63.2	7,236	7.3	78	18	157.5	134	40	0.3	3

== Personal life ==
Fromm is a Christian.

His nickname is "Jake Fromm State Farm" in reference to an advertising campaign from State Farm, which later paid him to represent them during coverage of Super Bowl LV. The nickname started as a running joke from high school.

In June 2020, Fromm apologized after screenshots emerged of a text conversation from 2019 in which a friend wrote, "But no guns are good. They need to let me get suppressors", before Fromm added, "Just make them very expensive so only elite white people can get them".

In 2021, Fromm married his college girlfriend, Caroline Ostman, who had been a member of the Georgia volleyball team. In 2022, he graduated from the University of Georgia with a degree in finance.

In 2025, Fromm began work as an insurance specialist.
