= 2017 South Carolina Gamecocks football team =

American college football season

2017 South Carolina Gamecocks football

Outback Bowl champion

Outback Bowl, W 26–19 vs. Michigan
- Conference: Southeastern Conference
- East Division
- Record: 9–4 (5–3 SEC)
- Head coach: Will Muschamp (2nd season)
- Offensive coordinator: Kurt Roper (2nd season)
- Co-offensive coordinator: Bryan McClendon (2nd season)
- Offensive scheme: Spread
- Defensive coordinator: Travaris Robinson (2nd season)
- Base defense: Multiple 4–3
- Home stadium: Williams-Brice Stadium

2017 Southeastern Conference football standings
	Conf.			Overall
Team	W		L	W		L
Eastern Division
No. 2 Georgia x$^	7	–	1	13	–	2
South Carolina	5	–	3	9	–	4
Kentucky	4	–	4	7	–	6
Missouri	4	–	4	7	–	6
Florida	3	–	5	4	–	7
Vanderbilt	1	–	7	5	–	7
Tennessee	0	–	8	4	–	8
Western Division
No. 10 Auburn xy	7	–	1	10	–	4
No. 1 Alabama x#^	7	–	1	13	–	1
No. 18 LSU	6	–	2	9	–	4
No. 19 Mississippi State	4	–	4	9	–	4
Texas A&M	4	–	4	7	–	6
Ole Miss*	3	–	5	6	–	6
Arkansas	1	–	7	4	–	8
Championship: Georgia 28, Auburn 7
# – College Football Playoff champion; ^ – College Football Playoff participant; $ – Conference champion; x – Division champion/co-champions; y – Championship game participant; * Ole Miss ineligible for postseason due to NCAA sanctions; Rankings from AP Poll

The 2017 South Carolina Gamecocks football team represented the University of South Carolina in the 2017 NCAA Division I FBS football season. The Gamecocks played their home games at Williams–Brice Stadium in Columbia, South Carolina and competed in the East Division of the Southeastern Conference (SEC). They were led by second-year head coach Will Muschamp. They finished the season 9–4, 5–3 in SEC play to finish in second place in the East Division. They were invited to the Outback Bowl, where they defeated Michigan.

Led by returning quarterback Jake Bentley and the SEC's top turnover defense, the 2017 season was the peak of the Muschamp era. The Gamecocks had their first winning season and bowl victory since 2014. The nine-win season was only the seventh in school history, and the first since 2013. South Carolina had another three-win improvement over the previous season.

== 2017 recruiting class ==
College recruiting information (2017)
Name	Hometown	School	Height	Weight	Commit date
Jamyest Williams; CB	Loganville, GA	Grayson	5 ft 9 in (1.75 m)	173 lb (78 kg)	Aug 27, 2016
Jamyest Williams; CB	Recruit ratings: Scout: Rivals: 247Sports: ESPN: (86)				
Shi Smith; ATH	Union, SC	Union	6 ft 0 in (1.83 m)	175 lb (79 kg)	Jun 11, 2016
Shi Smith; ATH	Recruit ratings: Scout: Rivals: 247Sports: ESPN: (83)				
OrTre Smith; WR	Mount Pleasant, SC	Wando	6 ft 4 in (1.93 m)	217 lb (98 kg)	Sep 11, 2016
OrTre Smith; WR	Recruit ratings: Scout: Rivals: 247Sports: ESPN: (81)				
M.J. Webb; DE	Madison, GA	Morgan County High	6 ft 3 in (1.91 m)	271 lb (123 kg)	Aug 19, 2016
M.J. Webb; DE	Recruit ratings: Scout: Rivals: 247Sports: ESPN: (81)				
Aaron Sterling; DE	Tucker, GA	Tucker High School	6 ft 1 in (1.85 m)	259 lb (117 kg)	Feb 1, 2017
Aaron Sterling; DE	Recruit ratings: Scout: Rivals: 247Sports: ESPN: (81)				
Javon Kinlaw; DT	Goose Creek, SC	Jones County Junior College	6 ft 5 in (1.96 m)	300 lb (140 kg)	Feb 1, 2017
Javon Kinlaw; DT	Recruit ratings: Scout: Rivals: 247Sports: ESPN: (81)				
Will Register; TE	Chapin, SC	Chapin	6 ft 4 in (1.93 m)	240 lb (110 kg)	Nov 11, 2016
Will Register; TE	Recruit ratings: Scout: Rivals: 247Sports: ESPN: (81)				
Keisean Nixon; CB	Compton, CA	Arizona Western College	6 ft 0 in (1.83 m)	200 lb (91 kg)	Dec 14, 2016
Keisean Nixon; CB	Recruit ratings: Scout: Rivals: 247Sports: ESPN: (83)				
Chad Terrell; WR	Dallas, GA	North Paulding	6 ft 2 in (1.88 m)	205 lb (93 kg)	Nov 11, 2016
Chad Terrell; WR	Recruit ratings: Scout: Rivals: 247Sports: ESPN: (79)				
Overall recruit ranking: Scout: 16 Rivals: 16 247Sports: 21 ESPN: 19
Note: In many cases, Scout, Rivals, 247Sports, On3, and ESPN may conflict in their listings of height and weight.; In these cases, the average was taken. ESPN grades are on a 100-point scale.; Sources: "2017 Team Ranking". Rivals.com.

== Schedule ==
South Carolina announced its 2017 football schedule on September 13, 2016. The 2017 schedule consists of 7 home games, 4 away, and 1 neutral site game in the regular season. The Gamecocks hosted SEC foes Arkansas, Florida, Kentucky, and Vanderbilt, and traveled to Georgia, Missouri, Tennessee, and Texas A&M.

The Gamecocks hosted three of its four non–conference games which are against Clemson from the Atlantic Coast Conference (ACC), Louisiana Tech from Conference USA and Wofford from the Southern Conference and travel to Charlotte, North Carolina for the Belk Kickoff against NC State from the ACC.

Date	Time	Opponent	Rank	Site	TV	Result	Attendance
September 2	3:00 p.m.	vs. NC State*		Bank of America Stadium; Charlotte, NC (Belk Kickoff Game)	ESPN	W 35–28	50,367
September 9	7:00 p.m.	at Missouri		Faurot Field; Columbia, MO (Mayor's Cup, SEC Nation)	ESPN2	W 31–13	55,023
September 16	7:30 p.m.	Kentucky		Williams-Brice Stadium; Columbia, SC	SECN	L 13–23	82,493
September 23	3:30 p.m.	Louisiana Tech*		Williams-Brice Stadium; Columbia, SC	SECN	W 17–16	71,821
September 30	7:30 p.m.	at Texas A&M		Kyle Field; College Station, TX	SECN	L 17–24	96,430
October 7	4:00 p.m.	Arkansas		Williams-Brice Stadium; Columbia, SC	SECN	W 48–22	79,416
October 14	12:00 p.m.	at Tennessee		Neyland Stadium; Knoxville, TN (rivalry)	ESPN	W 15–9	98,104
October 28	4:00 p.m.	Vanderbilt		Williams-Brice Stadium; Columbia, SC	SECN	W 34–27	78,992
November 4	3:30 p.m.	at No. 2 Georgia		Sanford Stadium; Athens, GA (rivalry)	CBS	L 10–24	92,746
November 11	12:00 p.m.	Florida		Williams-Brice Stadium; Columbia, SC	CBS	W 28–20	79,727
November 18	4:00 p.m.	No. 7 (FCS) Wofford*		Williams-Brice Stadium; Columbia, SC	SECN	W 31–10	74,742
November 25	7:30 p.m.	No. 3 Clemson*	No. 24	Williams-Brice Stadium; Columbia, SC (Palmetto Bowl / SEC Nation)	ESPN	L 10–34	82,908
January 1, 2018	12:00 p.m.	vs. Michigan*		Raymond James Stadium; Tampa, FL (Outback Bowl)	ESPN2	W 26–19	45,687
*Non-conference game; Rankings from AP Poll and CFP Rankings after October 31 released prior to game; All times are in Eastern time

Schedule source:

== Roster ==
2017 South Carolina Gamecocks football team roster
Players
Coaches
Offense

Pos.	#	Name	Class
WR	1	Deebo Samuel	Jr
WR	3	K. C. Crosby	Jr
QB	4	Darius Douglas	Fr
RB	5	Rico Dowdle	So
WR	6	Terry Googer	Jr
WR	8	Randrecous Davis	Fr
WR	9	Jerad Washington	So
QB	10	Jay Urich	Fr
QB	12	Michael Scarnecchia	Jr
WR	13	Shi Smith	Fr
QB	15	Drew Dinsmore	Fr
QB	16	Bailey Hart	Fr
QB	17	Danny Gordon	Jr
WR	18	Ortre Smith	Fr
QB	19	Jake Bentley	So
WR	24	Garrett Frederick	Fr
RB	25	A. J. Turner	So
RB	27	Ty'Son Williams	So
RB	31	Slade Carroll	Fr
RB	32	Caleb Kinlaw	Jr
RB	34	Mon Denson	So
RB	36	C. J. Freeman	Fr
TE	39	Parker Rankin	Fr
TE	40	Jacob August	Jr
TE	41	Caleb Jenerette	Fr
OL	50	Sadarius Hutcherson	Fr
OL	51	Cory Helms	Sr
OL	55	Christian Pellage	So
OL	60	Chandler Farrell	Fr
OL	61	Cameron Johnson	Fr
OL	63	Blake Camper	Jr
OL	66	Will Putnam	Fr
OL	67	Ryan Green	So
OL	69	D. J. Park	Sr
OL	70	Alan Knott	Sr
OL	71	Eric Douglas	Fr
OL	72	Donell Stanley	Jr
OL	73	Summie Carlay	Fr
OL	74	Dennis Daley	Jr
OL	75	Jordan Carty	Fr
OL	76	Jordan Rhodes	Fr
OL	77	Malik Young	Jr
OL	78	Zack Bailey	Jr
OL	79	Trey Derouen	So
WR	80	Shemar Glenn	So
TE	81	Hayden Hurst	Jr
TE	82	Evan Hinson	Fr
WR	83	Chavis Dawkins	So
TE	84	Kyle Markway	So
WR	85	Devin Dingle	So
WR	86	Chad Terrell	Fr
TE	87	Kiel Pollard	So
TE	88	Will Register	Fr
WR	89	Bryan Edwards	So

Defense

Pos.	#	Name	Class
DB	3	Chris Lammons	Sr
LB	4	Bryson Allen-Williams	Sr
DL	5	Keir Thomas	So
LB	6	T. J. Brunson	So
DB	7	Jamarcus King	Sr
DL	8	D. J. Wonnum	So
DB	9	Keisean Nixon	Jr
LB	10	Skai Moore	Sr
LB	11	Eldridge Thompson	Jr
DB	12	Kaleb Chalmers	So
DL	15	Aaron Sterling	Fr
DB	16	Rashad Fenton	Jr
DB	17	Javon Charleston	So
DL	19	Brad Johnson	Fr
DB	21	Jamyest Williams	Fr
DB	22	Steven Montac	Jr
DB	23	Korey Banks	So
DB	24	D. J. Smith	Sr
DB	26	Jaylin Dickerson	Fr
DB	28	Tavyn Jackson	Fr
LB	29	Antoine Wilder	So
LB	30	Damani Staley	Fr
DB	33	Zay Brown	Fr
DB	34	Scott Grant	Jr
DL	35	Daniel Fennell	So
LB	36	Sean McGonigal	Fr
DB	39	Demetrius Smalls	Sr
DB	40	Jason Senn	So
LB	44	Sherrod Greene	Fr
LB	45	Spencer Eason-Riddle	Fr
DB	47	Jaylan Foster	So
DL	50	Griffin Gentry	Fr
LB	53	Mitch Langford	Jr
LB	54	Davonne Bowen	Fr
DE	57	Jazunne Outlaw	Fr
LB	58	Cole Davis	Fr
LB	59	Alex DeLoach	Fr
DL	61	Javion Duncan	Jr
DL	90	Taylor Stallworth	Sr
DL	91	Shameik Blackshear	So
DL	93	Ulric Jones	Sr
DL	94	M. J. Webb	Fr
DL	95	Dante Sawyer	Sr
DL	96	Aaron Thompson	Fr
DL	97	Kobe Smith	So
DL	99	Javon Kinlaw	So

Special teams

Pos.	#	Name	Class
K/P	20	Joseph Charlton	So
K	42	Alexander Woznick	Fr
K/P	43	Parker White	Fr
LS	45	Ben Asbury	Jr
LS	46	Harrison Freeman	Fr
K/P	47	Austin Snow	Fr
LS	49	Matthew Smith	Fr
K	62	Brandon Chiazza	Fr

Head coach

- Will Muschamp

Coordinators/assistant coaches

Legend

- (C) Team captain
- (S) Suspended
- (I) Ineligible
- Injured
- Redshirt

Roster

== Rankings ==
Ranking movements Legend: ██ Increase in ranking ██ Decrease in ranking — = Not ranked RV = Received votes
	Week															
Poll	Pre	1	2	3	4	5	6	7	8	9	10	11	12	13	14	Final
AP	—	RV	RV	—	—	—	—	RV	RV	RV	RV	—	RV	—	—	RV
Coaches	—	RV	RV	—	RV	—	RV	RV	RV	RV	RV	RV	RV	RV	RV	RV
CFP	Not released									—	—	—	24	—	—	Not released
