= 2017 SEC Championship Game =

- Conference Championship
- Logo of the 2017 SEC Championship Game
Georgia Bulldogs	Auburn Tigers
(11–1)	(10–2)
28	7
Head coach: Kirby Smart	Head coach: Gus Malzahn
AP / Coaches / CFP; 6 / 6 / 6	AP / Coaches / CFP; 4 / 4 / 2
	1	2	3	4	Total
Georgia	0	10	3	15	28
Auburn	7	0	0	0	7
- Date: December 2, 2017
- Season: 2017
- Stadium: Mercedes-Benz Stadium
- Location: Atlanta, Georgia
- MVP: Roquan Smith
- Favorite: Georgia by 1.5
- Referee: John McDaid
- Attendance: 76,534

United States TV coverage
- Network: CBS, Westwood One, SEC Radio
- Announcers: Brad Nessler, Gary Danielson and Allie LaForce (CBS); Ryan Radtke, Derek Rackley and Olivia Harlan (Westwood One); Dave Neal, David Archer and David Crane (SEC Radio)

2017 Southeastern Conference football standings
	Conf.			Overall
Team	W		L	W		L
Eastern Division
No. 2 Georgia x$^	7	–	1	13	–	2
South Carolina	5	–	3	9	–	4
Kentucky	4	–	4	7	–	6
Missouri	4	–	4	7	–	6
Florida	3	–	5	4	–	7
Vanderbilt	1	–	7	5	–	7
Tennessee	0	–	8	4	–	8
Western Division
No. 10 Auburn xy	7	–	1	10	–	4
No. 1 Alabama x#^	7	–	1	13	–	1
No. 18 LSU	6	–	2	9	–	4
No. 19 Mississippi State	4	–	4	9	–	4
Texas A&M	4	–	4	7	–	6
Ole Miss*	3	–	5	6	–	6
Arkansas	1	–	7	4	–	8
Championship: Georgia 28, Auburn 7
# – College Football Playoff champion; ^ – College Football Playoff participant; $ – Conference champion; x – Division champion/co-champions; y – Championship game participant; * Ole Miss ineligible for postseason due to NCAA sanctions; Rankings from AP Poll

The 2017 SEC Championship Game was played on December 2, 2017, at Mercedes-Benz Stadium in Atlanta, and determined the 2017 football champion of the Southeastern Conference (SEC). This was the first SEC Conference football championship at the Mercedes-Benz Stadium. The game featured the Eastern Division Champion, Georgia Bulldogs against the Western Division Co-Champion, the Auburn Tigers. This championship game marked the first time Auburn and Georgia had rematched each other in the same year, with the previous iteration having been played on November 11, 2017. In the earlier game, Auburn beat Georgia by a score of 40–17. In this rematch, Georgia won the SEC Championship by beating Auburn 28–7. This was also the first SEC Championship Game with new SEC on CBS announcer Brad Nessler replacing Verne Lundquist, who retired in 2016. The game was televised nationally by CBS.

== 2016 season ==
In the 2016 SEC Championship Game, the western division champion Alabama defeated the eastern division champion Florida 54–16 in a rematch of the 2015 SEC Championship Game. It was the last SEC title game to be held at the Georgia Dome, which was demolished shortly before the 2017 title game, following the opening of Mercedes-Benz Stadium.

== Teams ==
Auburn

The Auburn Tigers clinched the SEC Western Division (co-champion) and a spot in the SEC championship game after defeating rival Alabama in the final game of the regular season. The Tigers got off to a slow start, allowing 11 sacks in a 14–6 loss at ACC foe and #3 ranked Clemson. However, the Tigers rebounded by winning four straight games, all blowouts, and were ranked #10 going into a game at LSU, in which Auburn was heavily favored. Auburn built a 20–0 lead in the first half, only to see it slip away in the second half as the Auburn Tigers fell to LSU 27–23. The Tigers then defeated conference foes Arkansas and Texas A&M in blowouts before facing AP ranked #2 Georgia on November 11, by which point the Tigers had climbed back up to #10 in the AP Poll. The Tigers dominated the Bulldogs 40–17, and moved up to #6 in the polls as a result. After a tune-up game against Louisiana–Monroe, the #6 Tigers faced #1 ranked Alabama, with the winner going to the SEC Championship. It was the Tigers who prevailed 26–14, setting up a rematch against Georgia.

Georgia

The Bulldogs clinched the SEC Eastern Division after beating rival South Carolina on November 4. It was the earliest a spot in the SEC Championship Game had been clinched since 2009. The Bulldogs had a great regular season, going 11–1. In the second game of the year, the Bulldogs defeated Notre Dame 20–19 on a late field goal. Later in September, they defeated #17 ranked Mississippi State 31–3, solidifying themselves as title contenders. After victories over lesser conference foes, the Bulldogs had a chance to clinch the SEC East with a victory over Florida. They dominated the Gators 42–7. After a win over South Carolina, the Bulldogs were ranked #1 in the CFP poll and #2 in the AP Poll. However, that week they were defeated handily by Auburn for their first loss of the year. The Bulldogs bounced back and defeated Kentucky and rival Georgia Tech to set up a rematch with Auburn.

== Game summary ==
Georgia and Auburn met in the SEC Championship Game, the first ever in the Mercedes-Benz Stadium, for a rematch of the regular-season contest. Auburn scored an early touchdown on their first drive of the game, going 75 yards on 10 plays. The Auburn defense forced Georgia to punt on their first drive after 7 plays. Both teams would go three-and-out on their next drives. Early into the second quarter, Auburn drove into the red zone before Jarrett Stidham fumbled the ball as he was sacked by Davin Bellamy. Roquan Smith recovered the fumble, and Georgia subsequently scored their first touchdown of the game on a 7 play, 83-yard drive. Auburn was forced to go three-and-out afterwards, and Georgia responded with another scoring drive. After a potential touchdown pass was erased by a controversial "pick play" call, Georgia settled for a 27-yard field goal to take their first lead of the game. Neither team would score for the remainder of the first half.

Georgia received the ball at the beginning of the first half, but they were forced to punt after 5 plays. Auburn would once again march into the red zone, but this time, Daniel Carlson's 31-yard field goal attempt was blocked by DaQuan Hawkins-Muckle and recovered by Dominick Sanders. Both teams traded punts on their next drives. Late into the third quarter, Georgia extended their lead to 13–7 with a 35-yard field goal. On Auburn's next drive, Lorenzo Carter forced Kerryon Johnson to fumble the ball, and Roquan Smith again recovered the fumble. Georgia would subsequently score a touchdown on a 4-play, 39-yard drive, capped off by a successful 2-point conversion to put Georgia up 21–7. After the Georgia defense forced Auburn to go three-and-out on their next drive, D'Andre Swift would score on a 64-yard touchdown run to put Georgia up 28–7, the final score of the game.

=== Scoring summary ===
Scoring summary

Quarter	Time	Drive			Team	Scoring information	Score	
Quarter	Time	Plays	Yards	TOP	Team	Scoring information	UGA	AUB
1	9:54	10	75	5:06	AUB	Nate Craig-Myers 6-yard touchdown reception from Jarrett Stidham, Daniel Carlson kick good	0	7
2	10:14	7	83	2:50	UGA	Isaac Nauta 2-yard touchdown reception from Jake Fromm, Rodrigo Blankenship kick good	7	7
2	4:59	8	58	3:34	UGA	27-yard field goal by Rodrigo Blankenship	10	7
3	1:26	7	62	3:22	UGA	35-yard field goal by Rodrigo Blankenship	13	7
4	13:06	4	39	1:43	UGA	Terry Godwin 7-yard touchdown reception from Jake Fromm, 2-point Jake Fromm pass complete to Terry Godwin	21	7
4	10:34	3	75	1:38	UGA	D'Andre Swift 64-yard touchdown run, Rodrigo Blankenship kick good	28	7
"TOP" = time of possession. For other American football terms, see Glossary of American football.							28	7

=== Statistics ===
Statistics	UGA	AUB
First downs	20	18
Total offense	421	259
Rushing yards–TD	238–1	114–0
Passing yards–TD	183–2	145–1
Passing: Comp–Att–Int	16–22–0	16–32–0
Fumbles: Number–Lost	1–0	2–2
Penalties: Number–Yards	7–91	5–39
Punts: Average Yardage	44.0	40.7
Punt returns-Yards:	1–3	2–14
Kickoff returns-Yards:	0–0	1–20
Sacks: Number–Yards	3–24	2–13
Field Goals: Good–Att	2–2	0–0
Points off turnovers	14	0
Time of Possession	33:02	26:58
