= 2017 Texas Bowl =

2017 Academy Sports + Outdoors Texas Bowl
- 12th Texas Bowl
Texas Longhorns	Missouri Tigers
(6–6)	(7–5)
Big 12	SEC
33	16
Head coach: Tom Herman	Head coach: Barry Odom
	1	2	3	4	Total
Texas	14	7	2	10	33
Missouri	0	7	9	0	16
- Date: December 27, 2017
- Season: 2017
- Stadium: NRG Stadium
- Location: Houston, Texas
- MVP: Michael Dickson (P, Texas)
- Referee: Mark Duddy (Pac-12)
- Attendance: 67,820
- Payout: US$3,000,000

United States TV coverage
- Network: ESPN/ESPN Radio
- Announcers: TV: Adam Amin, Dusty Dvoracek, Molly McGrath; Radio: Bill Rosinski, David Norrie, Ian Fitzsimmons

The 2017 Texas Bowl was an American college football bowl game played on December 27, 2017, at NRG Stadium in Houston, Texas. Sponsored by the Academy Sports + Outdoors sporting goods company, it was officially known as the Academy Sports + Outdoors Texas Bowl. The game was one of the 2017–18 bowl games concluding the 2017 FBS football season.

The twelfth edition of the Texas Bowl, the game featured the Texas Longhorns of the Big 12 Conference against the Missouri Tigers of the Southeastern Conference. This was the teams' 24th meeting. Prior to the game, Texas led the series 17–6. This was their first match-up since Missouri left the Big 12 Conference after the 2011 season. Texas defeated Missouri, 33–16.

== Game summary ==
=== Scoring summary ===
Scoring summary

Quarter	Time	Drive			Team	Scoring information	Score	
Quarter	Time	Plays	Yards	TOP	Team	Scoring information	TEX	MIZ
1	13:28	5	75	1:32	TEX	Daniel Young 22-yard touchdown reception from Shane Buechele, Joshua Rowland kick good	7	0
1	3:58	4	55	1:19	TEX	John Burt 7-yard touchdown reception from Sam Ehlinger, Joshua Rowland kick good	14	0
2	12:10	5	50	1:19	MIZ	Ish Witter 4-yard touchdown run, Tucker McCann kick good	14	7
2	7:47				TEX	Fumble recovery returned 38 yards for touchdown by Anthony Wheeler, Joshua Rowland kick good	21	7
3	14:42	1	79	0:18	MIZ	Johnathon Johnson 79-yard touchdown reception from Drew Lock, 2-point attempt failed	21	13
3	2:44	16	87	5:33	MIZ	28-yard field goal by Tucker McCann	21	16
3	0:10	2	-10	0:10	TEX	Missouri rush for -10 yards, safety	23	16
4	12:15	8	30	3:55	TEX	41-yard field goal by Joshua Rowland	26	16
4	1:39	4	14	1:36	TEX	Armanti Foreman 18-yard touchdown run, Joshua Rowland kick good	33	16
"TOP" = time of possession. For other American football terms, see Glossary of American football.							33	16

=== Statistics ===
	1	2	3	4	Total
Longhorns	14	7	2	10	33
Tigers	0	7	9	0	16

Statistics	TEX	MIZ
First downs	16	17
Plays–yards	71–280	68–390
Rushes–yards	42–113	34–121
Passing yards	167	269
Passing: Comp–Att–Int	17–29–0	18–34–1
Time of possession	35:15	24:45

Team	Category	Player	Statistics
TEX	Passing	Sam Ehlinger	11/15, 112 yds, 1 TD
TEX	Rushing	Daniel Young	12 car, 48 yds
TEX	Receiving	Daniel Young	3 rec, 64 yds, 1 TD
MIZ	Passing	Drew Lock	18/34, 269 yds, 1 TD, 1 INT
MIZ	Rushing	Larry Rountree III	14 car, 74 yds
MIZ	Receiving	Johnathon Johnson	3 rec, 85 yds, 1 TD
