= 2017 Missouri Tigers football team =

American college football season

2017 Missouri Tigers football

Texas Bowl, L 16–33 vs. Texas
- Conference: Southeastern Conference
- Eastern Division
- Record: 7–6 (4–4 SEC)
- Head coach: Barry Odom (2nd season)
- Offensive coordinator: Josh Heupel (2nd season)
- Offensive scheme: Veer and shoot
- Co-defensive coordinator: Ryan Walters (2nd season)
- Base defense: 4–3
- Home stadium: Faurot Field

2017 Southeastern Conference football standings
| | Conf. | | | Overall |
| Team | W | | L | W | | L |
|---|---|---|---|---|---|---|
Eastern Division
| No. 2 Georgia x$^ | 7 | – | 1 | 13 | – | 2 |
| South Carolina | 5 | – | 3 | 9 | – | 4 |
| Kentucky | 4 | – | 4 | 7 | – | 6 |
| Missouri | 4 | – | 4 | 7 | – | 6 |
| Florida | 3 | – | 5 | 4 | – | 7 |
| Vanderbilt | 1 | – | 7 | 5 | – | 7 |
| Tennessee | 0 | – | 8 | 4 | – | 8 |
Western Division
| No. 10 Auburn xy | 7 | – | 1 | 10 | – | 4 |
| No. 1 Alabama x#^ | 7 | – | 1 | 13 | – | 1 |
| No. 18 LSU | 6 | – | 2 | 9 | – | 4 |
| No. 19 Mississippi State | 4 | – | 4 | 9 | – | 4 |
| Texas A&M | 4 | – | 4 | 7 | – | 6 |
| Ole Miss* | 3 | – | 5 | 6 | – | 6 |
| Arkansas | 1 | – | 7 | 4 | – | 8 |
Championship: Georgia 28, Auburn 7
# – College Football Playoff champion; ^ – College Football Playoff participant; $ – Conference champion; x – Division champion/co-champions; y – Championship game participant; * Ole Miss ineligible for postseason due to NCAA sanctions; Rankings from AP Poll

The 2017 Missouri Tigers football team represented the University of Missouri in the 2017 NCAA Division I FBS football season. The Tigers played their home games at Faurot Field in Columbia, Missouri and competed in the Eastern Division of the Southeastern Conference (SEC). They were led by second-year head coach Barry Odom. They finished the season 7–6, 4–4 in SEC play to finish in a tie for third place in the Eastern Division. They were invited to the Texas Bowl where they lost to Texas.

On November 24, quarterback Drew Lock broke the SEC passing record for touchdowns in a season with 43, in a 48–45 win over Arkansas.

== Recruiting ==
=== Position key ===
| Back | B | Center | C | Cornerback | CB | Defensive back | DB |
| Defensive end | DE | Defensive lineman | DL | Defensive tackle | DT | End | E |
| Fullback | FB | Guard | G | Halfback | HB | Kicker | K |
| Kickoff returner | KR | Offensive tackle | OT | Offensive lineman | OL | Linebacker | LB |
| Long snapper | LS | Punter | P | Punt returner | PR | Quarterback | QB |
| Running back | RB | Safety | S | Tight end | TE | Wide receiver | WR |

=== Recruits ===
The Tigers signed a total of 25 recruits.

College recruiting (2017)
| Name | Hometown | School | Height | Weight | Commit date |
|---|---|---|---|---|---|
| Daron Davis; RB | Kansas City, Missouri | Hogan Preparatory Academy | 6 ft 2 in (1.88 m) | 190 lb (86 kg) | Nov 6, 2015 |
| Daron Davis; RB | Recruit ratings: Scout: Rivals: 247Sports: ESPN: | | | | |
| Hyrin White; OT | DeSoto, Texas | DeSoto HS | 6 ft 7 in (2.01 m) | 292 lb (132 kg) | Mar 17, 2016 |
| Hyrin White; OT | Recruit ratings: Scout: Rivals: 247Sports: ESPN: | | | | |
| Pompey Coleman; OT | Indianapolis, Indiana | Ben Davis HS | 6 ft 5 in (1.96 m) | 280 lb (130 kg) | Apr 9, 2016 |
| Pompey Coleman; OT | Recruit ratings: Scout: Rivals: 247Sports: ESPN: | | | | |
| Logan Christopherson; TE | Lemont, Illinois | Lemont HS | 6 ft 7 in (2.01 m) | 216 lb (98 kg) | Jun 2, 2016 |
| Logan Christopherson; TE | Recruit ratings: Scout: Rivals: 247Sports: ESPN: | | | | |
| Larry Borom; OG | Bloomfield Hills, Michigan | Brother Rice HS | 6 ft 5 in (1.96 m) | 338 lb (153 kg) | Jul 23, 2016 |
| Larry Borom; OG | Recruit ratings: Scout: Rivals: 247Sports: ESPN: | | | | |
| Case Cook; C | Carrollton, Georgia | Carrollton HS | 6 ft 5 in (1.96 m) | 290 lb (130 kg) | Jul 26, 2016 |
| Case Cook; C | Recruit ratings: Scout: Rivals: 247Sports: ESPN: | | | | |
| Aubrey Miller; LB | Memphis, Tennessee | Whitehaven HS | 6 ft 0 in (1.83 m) | 207 lb (94 kg) | Jul 26, 2016 |
| Aubrey Miller; LB | Recruit ratings: Scout: Rivals: 247Sports: ESPN: | | | | |
| Jamal Brooks; LB | Bessemer, Alabama | Bessemer City HS | 6 ft 1 in (1.85 m) | 227 lb (103 kg) | Jul 26, 2016 |
| Jamal Brooks; LB | Recruit ratings: Scout: Rivals: 247Sports: ESPN: | | | | |
| Joshuah Bledsoe; S | Houston, Texas | Dekaney HS | 6 ft 0 in (1.83 m) | 191 lb (87 kg) | Jul 27, 2016 |
| Joshuah Bledsoe; S | Recruit ratings: Scout: Rivals: 247Sports: ESPN: | | | | |
| Chris Turner; DE | Hammond, Louisiana | Hammond HS | 6 ft 4 in (1.93 m) | 225 lb (102 kg) | Nov 13, 2016 |
| Chris Turner; DE | Recruit ratings: Scout: Rivals: 247Sports: ESPN: | | | | |
| Terry Petry; CB | Missouri City, Texas | Ridge Point HS | 5 ft 11 in (1.80 m) | 180 lb (82 kg) | Nov 30, 2016 |
| Terry Petry; CB | Recruit ratings: Scout: Rivals: 247Sports: ESPN: | | | | |
| Rashad Brandon; DT | Jersey City, New Jersey | ASA College | 6 ft 2 in (1.88 m) | 315 lb (143 kg) | Dec 3, 2016 |
| Rashad Brandon; DT | Recruit ratings: Scout: Rivals: 247Sports: ESPN: | | | | |
| Nate Anderson; DE | Toronto, Ontario, Canada | New Mexico Military Institute | 6 ft 3 in (1.91 m) | 255 lb (116 kg) | Dec 4, 2016 |
| Nate Anderson; DE | Recruit ratings: Scout: Rivals: 247Sports: ESPN: | | | | |
| Larry Rountree III; RB | Raleigh, North Carolina | Millbrook HS | 5 ft 11 in (1.80 m) | 204 lb (93 kg) | Dec 9, 2016 |
| Larry Rountree III; RB | Recruit ratings: Scout: Rivals: 247Sports: ESPN: | | | | |
| Yasir Durant; OG | Philadelphia, Pennsylvania | Arizona Western College | 6 ft 6 in (1.98 m) | 330 lb (150 kg) | Dec 12, 2016 |
| Yasir Durant; OG | Recruit ratings: Scout: Rivals: 247Sports: ESPN: | | | | |
| Isaiah Miller; RB | Jacksonville, Florida | Baldwin HS | 5 ft 11 in (1.80 m) | 191 lb (87 kg) | Dec 12, 2016 |
| Isaiah Miller; RB | Recruit ratings: Scout: Rivals: 247Sports: ESPN: | | | | |
| Adam Sparks; CB | Geismar, Louisiana | Dutchtown HS | 6 ft 0 in (1.83 m) | 170 lb (77 kg) | Dec 25, 2016 |
| Adam Sparks; CB | Recruit ratings: Scout: Rivals: 247Sports: ESPN: | | | | |
| Jordan Ulmer; S | Bellevue, Michigan | Bellevue HS | 6 ft 1 in (1.85 m) | 185 lb (84 kg) | Jan 7, 2017 |
| Jordan Ulmer; S | Recruit ratings: Scout: Rivals: 247Sports: ESPN: | | | | |
| Tyree Gillespie; S | Ocala, Florida | Vanguard HS | 6 ft 0 in (1.83 m) | 202 lb (92 kg) | Jan 22, 2017 |
| Tyree Gillespie; S | Recruit ratings: Scout: Rivals: 247Sports: ESPN: | | | | |
| Taylor Powell; QB | Fayetteville, Arkansas | Fayetteville HS | 6 ft 2 in (1.88 m) | 202 lb (92 kg) | Jan 23, 2017 |
| Taylor Powell; QB | Recruit ratings: Scout: Rivals: 247Sports: ESPN: | | | | |
| Kobie Whiteside; DT | Houston, Texas | Alief Taylor HS | 6 ft 1 in (1.85 m) | 304 lb (138 kg) | Jan 29, 2017 |
| Kobie Whiteside; DT | Recruit ratings: Scout: Rivals: 247Sports: ESPN: | | | | |
| Walter Palmore; DT | Columbus, Georgia | Eastern Arizona College | 6 ft 4 in (1.93 m) | 295 lb (134 kg) | Jan 30, 2017 |
| Walter Palmore; DT | Recruit ratings: Scout: Rivals: 247Sports: ESPN: | | | | |
| O'shae Clark; WR | Cypress, Texas | Cypress Springs HS | 5 ft 8 in (1.73 m) | 150 lb (68 kg) | Jan 31, 2017 |
| O'shae Clark; WR | Recruit ratings: Scout: Rivals: 247Sports: ESPN: | | | | |
| Caleb Sampson; DT | Covington, Louisiana | Northlake Christian School | 6 ft 3 in (1.91 m) | 260 lb (120 kg) | Feb 1, 2017 |
| Caleb Sampson; DT | Recruit ratings: Scout: Rivals: 247Sports: ESPN: | | | | |
| Malik Young; DT | Marietta, Georgia | Eastern Arizona College | 6 ft 2 in (1.88 m) | 280 lb (130 kg) | Feb 1, 2017 |
| Malik Young; DT | Recruit ratings: Scout: Rivals: 247Sports: ESPN: | | | | |
Overall recruit ranking:
Note: In many cases, Scout, Rivals, 247Sports, On3, and ESPN may conflict in their listings of height and weight.; In these cases, the average was taken. ESPN grades are on a 100-point scale.; Sources: "Missouri Football Commitments". Rivals.; "2017 Missouri Football Commits". Scout.; "ESPN". ESPN.; "Scout.com Team Recruiting Rankings". Scout.; "2017 Team Ranking". Rivals.com.

== Schedule ==
Missouri announced its 2017 football schedule on September 13, 2016. The 2017 schedule consists of 7 home games and 5 away games in the regular season. The Tigers will host SEC foes Auburn, Florida, South Carolina, and Tennessee, and will travel to Arkansas, Georgia, Kentucky, and Vanderbilt.

The Tigers will host three of its four non–conference games which are against Idaho from the Sun Belt Conference, Missouri State from the Missouri Valley Football Conference, Purdue from the Big Ten Conference and travel to UConn from the American Athletic Conference.

| Date | Time | Opponent | Site | TV | Result | Attendance |
|---|---|---|---|---|---|---|
| September 2 | 11:00 a.m. | Missouri State* | Faurot Field; Columbia, MO | SECN | W 72–43 | 50,131 |
| September 9 | 6:00 p.m. | South Carolina | Faurot Field; Columbia, MO (SEC Nation) | ESPN2 | L 13–31 | 55,023 |
| September 16 | 3:00 p.m. | Purdue* | Faurot Field; Columbia, MO | SECN | L 3–35 | 53,262 |
| September 23 | 6:30 p.m. | No. 15 Auburn | Faurot Field; Columbia, MO | ESPNU | L 14–51 | 54,574 |
| October 7 | 6:30 p.m. | at Kentucky | Kroger Field; Lexington, KY | SECN | L 34–40 | 57,476 |
| October 14 | 6:30 p.m. | at No. 4 Georgia | Sanford Stadium; Athens, GA (SEC Nation) | SECN | L 28–53 | 92,746 |
| October 21 | 11:00 a.m. | Idaho*^{†} | Faurot Field; Columbia, MO | SECN | W 68–21 | 47,648 |
| October 28 | 5:30 p.m. | at UConn* | Rentschler Field; East Hartford, CT | CBSSN | W 52–12 | 21,062 |
| November 4 | 11:00 a.m. | Florida | Faurot Field; Columbia, MO | ESPN2 | W 45–16 | 49,154 |
| November 11 | 6:30 p.m. | Tennessee | Faurot Field; Columbia, MO | SECN | W 50–17 | 50,637 |
| November 18 | 6:30 p.m. | at Vanderbilt | Vanderbilt Stadium; Nashville, TN | SECN | W 45–17 | 22,910 |
| November 24 | 1:30 p.m. | at Arkansas | Donald W. Reynolds Razorback Stadium; Fayetteville, AR (Battle Line Rivalry) | CBS | W 48–45 | 64,529 |
| December 27 | 8:00 pm | vs. Texas* | NRG Stadium; Houston, TX (Texas Bowl) | ESPN | L 16–33 | 67,820 |
*Non-conference game; ^{†}Homecoming; Rankings from AP Poll released prior to game; All times are in Central time

Schedule source:

== Roster ==
2017 Missouri Tigers football team roster
Players
Coaches
Offense

| Pos. | # | Name | Class |
|---|---|---|---|
| WR | 1 | Da'Ron Davis | Fr |
| QB | 2 | Micah Wilson | Fr |
| QB | 3 | Drew Lock | Jr |
| RB | 4 | Isaiah Miller | Fr |
| QB | 5 | Taylor Powell | Fr |
| WR | 6 | J'Mon Moore | Sr |
| WR | 7 | Nate Brown | Sr |
| WR | 8 | Justin Smith | So |
| WR | 9 | Dimetrios Mason | So |
| QB | 9 | Hayden Rymer | Fr |
| TE | 10 | Jason Reese | Sr |
| TE | 11 | Kendall Blanton | Jr |
| WR | 12 | Johnathon Johnson | So |
| WR | 14 | Ray Wingo | Jr |
| RB | 16 | Damarea Crockett | So |
| WR | 17 | Richaud Floyd | So |
| WR | 18 | Dominic Collins | Sr |
| QB | 19 | Jack Lowary | So |
| RB | 21 | Ish Witter | Sr |
| RB | 22 | Dawson Downing | Fr |
| WR | 24 | Cameren Rivers | Sr |
| WR | 28 | Steven Spadarotto | Jr |
| WR | 29 | Nate Strong | Jr |
| RB | 33 | Larry Rountree III | Fr |
| WR | 36 | Daniel Ellinger | Fr |
| RB | 43 | Jerney Jones | Fr |
| RB | 45 | Ezra Vaoifi | Fr |
| OL | 50 | Hyrin Morrison-White | Fr |
| OL | 54 | Trystan Colon-Castillo | Fr |
| OL | 56 | Samson Bailey | Jr |
| OL | 57 | Alec Abeln | Sr |
| OL | 59 | Case Cook | Fr |
| OL | 62 | Thomas Grossman | Jr |
| OL | 66 | Adam Ploudre | Sr |
| OL | 67 | Jonah Dubinski | So |
| OL | 69 | AJ Harris | So |
| OL | 70 | Yasir Durant | So |
| OL | 71 | Kevin Pendleton | Jr |
| OL | 72 | Kyle Mitchell | Sr |
| OL | 75 | Tre'Vour Simms | So |
| OL | 76 | Tyler Howell | Sr |
| OL | 77 | Paul Adams | Jr |
| OL | 78 | Pompey Coleman | Fr |
| OL | 79 | Larry Borom | Fr |
| TE | 81 | Albert Okwuegbunam | Fr |
| WR | 84 | Emanuel Hall | Jr |
| TE | 88 | Logan Christopherson | Fr |
| TE | 89 | Brendan Scales | Fr |

Defense

| Pos. | # | Name | Class |
|---|---|---|---|
| S | 1 | Anthony Hines | Sr |
| LB | 2 | TJ Warren | So |
| S | 3 | Ronnell Perkins | So |
| DL | 5 | Terry Beckner | Jr |
| LB | 6 | Tavon Ross | Jr |
| S | 7 | Cam Hilton | Jr |
| S | 8 | Thomas Wilson | Sr |
| DL | 9 | Malik Young | Jr |
| S | 10 | Tyree Gillespie | Fr |
| LB | 11 | Brandon Lee | Jr |
| S | 11 | Jordan Ulmer | Fr |
| S | 12 | Dominic Nelson | Jr |
| DB | 14 | Adam Sparks | Fr |
| LB | 15 | Grant Jones | Jr |
| DL | 16 | Marcell Frazier | Sr |
| DB | 17 | DeMarkus Acy | So |
| S | 18 | Joshuah Bledsoe | Fr |
| DB | 19 | Terry Petry | Fr |
| DL | 20 | Myles Eaddy | Fr |
| S | 20 | Kaleb Prewett | Jr |
| DB | 21 | Christian Holmes | So |
| DB | 22 | Anthony Sherrils | Sr |
| LB | 24 | Terez Hall | Jr |
| LB | 25 | Jamal Brooks | Fr |
| DB | 28 | Logan Cheadle | Sr |
| DL | 29 | Nate Anderson | Jr |
| S | 30 | Ryan Dalley | So |
| DB | 31 | Finis Stribling IV | Jr |
| DB | 33 | Jerod Alton | Fr |
| LB | 34 | Joey Burkett | Sr |
| DB | 35 | Sean Boyd | So |
| LB | 38 | Eric Beisel | Sr |
| DL | 39 | Chris Turner | Fr |
| LB | 40 | Aubrey Miller Jr. | Fr |
| DL | 45 | Franklin Agbasimere | So |
| LB | 46 | Jacob Trump | Jr |
| LB | 47 | Cale Garrett | So |
| LB | 48 | Roderick Winters | Jr |
| DL | 51 | Ed Cruz | Sr |
| LB | 53 | Joe Hoy | So |
| DL | 55 | Jordan Harold | Sr |
| DL | 61 | Adam Roland | Jr |
| DL | 72 | Caleb Sampson | Fr |
| DL | 78 | Kobie Whiteside | Fr |
| DL | 88 | Nate Howard | Jr |
| DL | 90 | Markell Utsey | So |
| DL | 93 | Tre Williams | Fr |
| DL | 94 | Tyrell Jacobs | So |
| DL | 95 | Rashad Brandon | Jr |
| DL | 96 | A.J. Logan | Sr |
| DL | 97 | Akial Byers | Fr |
| DL | 99 | Walter Palmore | Jr |

Special teams

| Pos. | # | Name | Class |
|---|---|---|---|
| K | 19 | Tucker McCann | So |
| P | 26 | Corey Fatony | Jr |
| LS | 81 | Harley Whitehouse | So |
| LS | 86 | James Workman | So |
| K | 92 | Nick Bartolotta | Sr |
| K | 93 | Andrew Carr | Jr |

Head coach

- Barry Odom

Coordinators/assistant coaches

- Andy Hill (associate head coach / special teams coordinator)
- Cornell Ford (assistant head coach / running backs)
- DeMontie Cross (defensive coordinator / inside linebackers)
- Josh Heupel (offensive coordinator / quarterbacks)
- Ryan Walters (co-defensive coordinator / secondary)
- Glen Elarbee (offensive line)
- Joe Jon Finley (tight ends)
- Brick Haley (defensive line)
- Brian Odom (outside linebackers)
- AJ Ofodile (wide receivers)
- Austyn Carta-Samuels (recruiting coordinator)

Legend

- (C) Team captain
- (S) Suspended
- (I) Ineligible
- Injured
- Redshirt

Roster
Last update: July 18, 2017
