= Joshuah Bledsoe =

American football player (born 1998)

Profile
- Position: Safety

Personal information
- Born: December 30, 1998 (age 27); Houston, Texas, U.S.
- Listed height: 6 ft 0 in (1.83 m)
- Listed weight: 208 lb (94 kg)

Career information
- High school: Dekaney (Spring, Texas)
- College: Missouri (2017–2020)
- NFL draft: 2021: 6th round, 188th overall pick

Career history
- New England Patriots (2021–2023); San Antonio Brahmas (2025)*; Pittsburgh Steelers (2025)*; Tennessee Titans (2025)*; Washington Commanders (2026)*
- * Offseason or practice squad member only

Career NFL statistics as of 2025
- Tackles: 1
- Stats at Pro Football Reference

Joshuah Bledsoe (born December 30, 1998) is an American professional football safety. He played college football for the Missouri Tigers. He was selected by the New England Patriots in the sixth round of the 2021 NFL draft.

== Early life ==
Bledsoe attended Dekaney High School in Spring, Texas. He played safety, cornerback and running back in high school. He committed to the University of Missouri to play college football.

== College career ==
Bledsoe played at Missouri from 2017 to 2020. During his career, he had 130 tackles, one interception and one sack over 46 games.

== Professional career ==
Pre-draft measurables
Height	Weight	Arm length	Hand span
5 ft 11 3/8 in (1.81 m)	204 lb (93 kg)	30 3/4 in (0.78 m)	9 5/8 in (0.24 m)
All values from Pro Day

=== New England Patriots ===
Bledsoe was selected by the New England Patriots in the sixth round, 188th overall, of the 2021 NFL draft. He signed his four-year rookie contract on May 13, 2021. He was placed on the active/non-football injury list at the start of training camp on July 21, 2021. He was placed on the reserve list to start the season. He was activated on December 14. He was placed on injured reserve on December 30 with a calf injury.

On August 29, 2023, Bledsoe was waived by the Patriots and re-signed to the practice squad. He was promoted to the active roster on December 30.

On August 28, 2024, Bledsoe was waived by the Patriots.

=== San Antonio Brahmas ===
On November 21, 2024, Bledsoe signed with the San Antonio Brahmas of the United Football League (UFL).

=== Pittsburgh Steelers ===
On January 14, 2025, Bledsoe signed a reserve/future contract with the Pittsburgh Steelers. He was released by Pittsburgh on June 5.

=== Tennessee Titans ===
On August 5, 2025, Bledsoe signed with the Tennessee Titans. He was waived by the Titans on August 25.

=== Washington Commanders ===
On August 25, 2026, Bledsoe signed with the Washington Commanders. Four days later, he was released as part of final roster cuts before the start of the 2026 season.
