= Tray Scott =

American football coach (born 1984)

Current position
- Title: Defensive line coach
- Team: Georgia
- Conference: SEC

Biographical details
- Born: November 13, 1984 (age 41); Crossett, Arkansas, U.S.
- Education: Arkansas Tech

Playing career
- 2003–2007: Arkansas Tech

Coaching career (HC unless noted)
- 2008–2009: Arkansas Tech (GA)
- 2010–2011: Arkansas State (GA)
- 2012: Ole Miss (GA)
- 2013–2014: UT Martin (DL)
- 2015–2016: North Carolina (DL)
- 2017–present: Georgia (DL)

Accomplishments and honors

Championships
- 2× national (2021, 2022)

Travion "Tray" Scott (born November 13, 1984) is an American college football coach who is currently the defensive line coach at Georgia.

== Coaching career ==
Scott began his coaching career as a graduate assistant at his alma mater, Arkansas Tech, in 2008, a position he would keep until 2010. He was then hired by Arkansas State in the same position, where he stayed until the conclusion of the 2011 season. In 2012, Scott was again hired as a graduate assistant, this time at Ole Miss. In 2013 he moved to UT Martin where he coached the defensive line until his departure in 2014. In 2015 he was hired by the North Carolina Tar Heels as the team's defensive line coach, and he stayed there until 2016. In 2017 he was hired as the defensive line coach for Ole Miss. A few months later, he left to become the defensive line coach for Georgia. Scott received a raise to $750,000 after winning the 2023 national championship. Scott was named the Recruiter of the Year by Rivals.com after helping the Bulldogs get the number two recruiting class in 2023.
