= Isaiah Wynn =

American football player (born 1995)

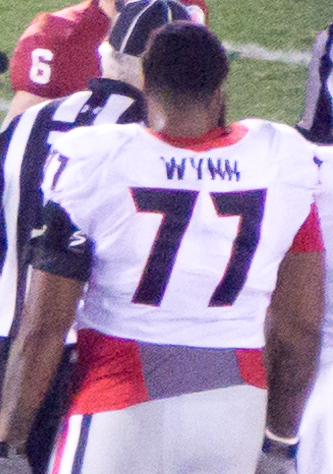
- Wynn in 2018

Profile
- Position: Offensive guard

Personal information
- Born: December 9, 1995 (age 30); St. Petersburg, Florida, U.S.
- Listed height: 6 ft 2 in (1.88 m)
- Listed weight: 305 lb (138 kg)

Career information
- High school: Lakewood (St. Petersburg)
- College: Georgia (2014–2017)
- NFL draft: 2018: 1st round, 23rd overall pick

Career history
- New England Patriots (2018–2022); Miami Dolphins (2023–2024)

Awards and highlights
- Super Bowl champion (LIII); First Team All-SEC (2017)

Career NFL statistics as of 2024
- Games played: 56
- Games started: 50
- Stats at Pro Football Reference

Isaiah Emmanuel Wynn (born December 9, 1995) is an American professional football offensive guard. He played college football for the Georgia Bulldogs and was selected by the New England Patriots in the first round of the 2018 NFL draft, where he played the first five years of his career.

== College career ==
Wynn played 11 games for the Georgia Bulldogs as a true freshman. During the 2015 and 2016 seasons, Wynn started 25 of 26 games, making 23 straight starts until he missed a game against Louisiana due to injury. Prior to the 2017 season, Wynn missed several practices due to illness. On December 11, 2017, Wynn was named a Second-team All-American.

Wynn majored in human development and family sciences.

== Professional career ==
Pre-draft measurables
Height	Weight	Arm length	Hand span
6 ft 2 3/4 in (1.90 m)	313 lb (142 kg)	33 3/8 in (0.85 m)	8 1/2 in (0.22 m)
All values from NFL Combine

=== New England Patriots ===
Wynn was selected by the New England Patriots with the 23rd overall pick in the first round of the 2018 NFL draft, using a pick acquired from the Los Angeles Rams in a trade that sent Brandin Cooks to Los Angeles. He was the second of six Georgia Bulldogs to be selected that year. In addition, Wynn and Sony Michel were the first pair of college teammates selected by the same team in the first round since Auburn players Jason Campbell and Carlos Rogers were taken in the 2005 NFL draft by the Washington Redskins.

In the second game of the preseason, Wynn suffered a torn Achilles and was ruled out for the 2018 season. He was placed on injured reserve on September 1, 2018. Without Wynn, the Patriots won Super Bowl LIII against the Los Angeles Rams 13–3.

Wynn entered the 2019 season as the Patriots starting left tackle. In Week 2, Wynn suffered a toe injury in the Patriots 43–0 shutout win against the Miami Dolphins. On September 17, 2019, the Patriots placed Wynn on injured reserve as a result of the toe injury he suffered in Week 2 against the Dolphins. He was designated for return from injured reserve on October 30, 2019, and began practicing with the team again. He was activated on November 19, 2019.

The Patriots opened the 2020 season with Wynn as their left tackle, but in week 6 he started at left guard for the first time in his pro career. He was placed on injured reserve on November 28, 2020, after suffering a knee injury in Week 11.

The Patriots exercised the fifth-year option on Wynn's contract on May 3, 2021, which guarantees a salary of $10.413 million for the 2022 season. He was moved over to right tackle with veteran Trent Brown moving over to the left side. He suffered a foot injury in Week 11, missed the next three games before being placed on injured reserve on December 17, 2022.

=== Miami Dolphins ===
Wynn signed a one-year deal with the Dolphins on May 14, 2023. He was named the Dolphins starting left guard. He was placed on injured reserve on October 24.

On March 18, 2024, Wynn re-signed with the Dolphins.

On July 18, 2024, Wynn was placed on the active/physically unable to perform (PUP) list, and placed on reserves to begin the season. He was activated on November 25.
