= Albert Okwuegbunam =

American football player (born 1998)

Profile
- Position: Tight end

Personal information
- Born: April 25, 1998 (age 28); Springfield, Illinois, U.S.
- Listed height: 6 ft 5 in (1.96 m)
- Listed weight: 258 lb (117 kg)

Career information
- High school: Sacred Heart-Griffin (Springfield)
- College: Missouri (2016–2019)
- NFL draft: 2020: 4th round, 118th overall pick

Career history
- Denver Broncos (2020–2022); Philadelphia Eagles (2023–2024); Indianapolis Colts (2024)*; Las Vegas Raiders (2025)
- * Offseason or practice squad member only

Awards and highlights
- 2× Second-team All-SEC (2017, 2019); All-SEC Freshman Team (2017)

Career NFL statistics as of 2025
- Receptions: 59
- Receiving yards: 582
- Receiving touchdowns: 4
- Stats at Pro Football Reference

Albert Chukwuemeka Okwuegbunam Jr. (/ˌoʊkwuˈeɪbunɑːm/ OH-kwoo-AY-boo-nahm; born April 25, 1998) is an American professional football tight end. He played college football for the Missouri Tigers and was selected by the Denver Broncos of the National Football League (NFL) in the 2020 NFL draft.

== Early life ==
Okwuegbunam attended Sacred Heart-Griffin High School in Springfield, Illinois. He played wide receiver for the football team. He committed to the University of Missouri to play college football.

== College career ==
After redshirting his first year at Missouri in 2016, Okwuegbunam played in all 13 games in 2017 and recorded 29 receptions for 415 yards and 11 touchdowns. He returned as Missouri's starter in 2018. Following the 2019 season, Okwuegbunam decided to forgo his final year of eligibility and declared for the 2020 NFL draft.

== Professional career ==
Pre-draft measurables
| Height | Weight | Arm length | Hand span | Wingspan | 40-yard dash | 10-yard split | 20-yard split |
|---|---|---|---|---|---|---|---|
| 6 ft 5 1/2 in (1.97 m) | 258 lb (117 kg) | 34 1/8 in (0.87 m) | 10 1/4 in (0.26 m) | 6 ft 7 3/8 in (2.02 m) | 4.49 s | 1.58 s | 2.62 s |
All values from NFL Combine

=== Denver Broncos ===
Okwuegbunam was selected by the Denver Broncos in the fourth round with the 118th overall pick in the 2020 NFL draft, reuniting with his former Missouri teammate, Drew Lock. He made his NFL debut in Week 6 of the season against the New England Patriots. He had two receptions for 45 yards in the 18–12 victory. He was placed on injured reserve on November 10, 2020, with a torn ACL.

On October 9, 2021, Okwuegbunam was placed on injured reserve with a hamstring injury. He was activated on October 30.

In 2022, Okwuegbunam played in 8 games for Denver, catching 10 passes for 95 yards and one touchdown.

=== Philadelphia Eagles ===
On August 29, 2023, Okwuegbunam was traded to the Philadelphia Eagles along with a 2025 seventh round pick for the Eagles’ 2025 sixth round pick.

On February 23, 2024, Okwuegbunam signed a one-year contract extension with the Eagles. He was placed on injured reserve on August 27. Okwuegbunam was released by the Eagles on November 5.

=== Indianapolis Colts ===
On December 17, 2024, Okwuegbunam was signed to the Indianapolis Colts practice squad. He signed a reserve/future contract with the Colts on January 6, 2025.

On July 31, 2025, Okwuegbunam was released by the Colts.

=== Las Vegas Raiders ===
On August 3, 2025, Okwuegbunam signed with the Las Vegas Raiders. He was released on August 26 as part of final roster cuts and re-signed to the practice squad the next day. Okwuegbunam signed a reserve/future contract with Las Vegas on January 5, 2026.

On August 30, 2026, Okwuegbunam was released by the Raiders as a part of final roster cuts. He was re-signed to the team's practice squad the following day. On September 3, following the signing of Ronnie Bell, Okwuegbunam was released by Las Vegas.

== NFL career statistics ==
Legend
| **Bold** | Career high |

=== Regular season ===
| Year | Team | Games | | Receiving | | | | | Fumbles | | | | |
| Year | Team | GP | GS | Rec | Yds | Avg | Lng | TD | FF | Fum | FR | Yds | TD |
|---|---|---|---|---|---|---|---|---|---|---|---|---|---|
| 2020 | DEN | 4 | 0 | 11 | 121 | **11.0** | 27 | 1 | 0 | 0 | 0 | 0 | 0 |
| 2021 | DEN | **14** | **6** | **33** | **330** | 10.0 | **64** | **2** | 0 | **1** | **1** | **2** | 0 |
| 2022 | DEN | 8 | 1 | 10 | 95 | 9.5 | 25 | 1 | 0 | 0 | 0 | 0 | 0 |
| 2023 | PHI | 4 | 0 | 0 | 0 | 0.0 | 0 | 0 | 0 | 0 | 0 | 0 | 0 |
| 2025 | LV | 1 | 0 | 5 | 36 | 7.2 | 16 | 0 | 0 | 0 | 0 | 0 | 0 |
| Career | | 31 | 7 | 59 | 582 | 9.9 | 64 | 4 | 0 | 1 | 1 | 2 | 0 |
