= Lorenzo Carter (American football) =

American football player (born 1995)

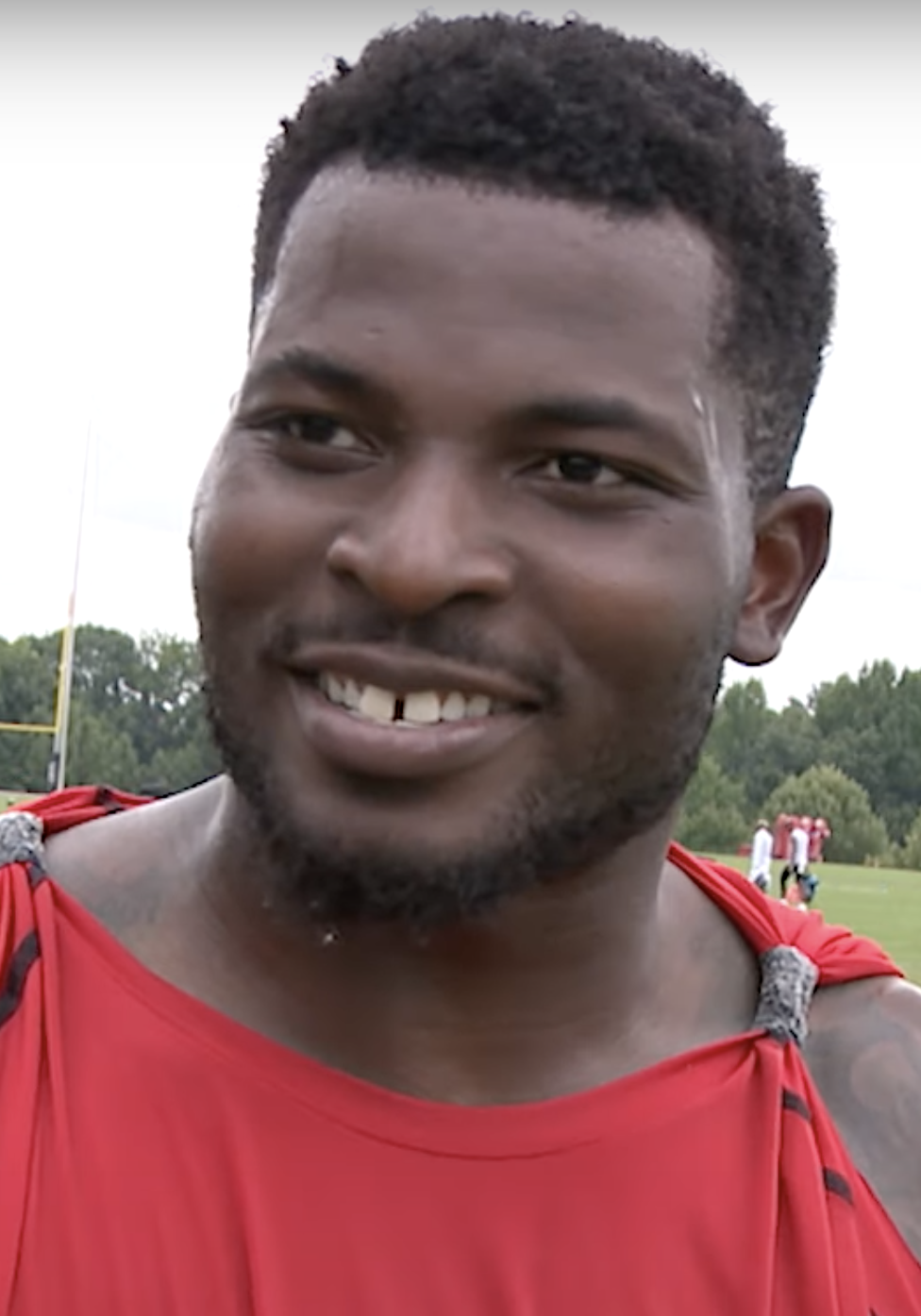
- Carter in 2022

No. 59, 9, 0
- Position: Linebacker

Personal information
- Born: December 10, 1995 (age 30); Memphis, Tennessee, U.S.
- Listed height: 6 ft 5 in (1.96 m)
- Listed weight: 264 lb (120 kg)

Career information
- High school: Norcross (Norcross, Georgia)
- College: Georgia (2014–2017)
- NFL draft: 2018: 3rd round, 66th overall pick

Career history
- New York Giants (2018–2021); Atlanta Falcons (2022–2024); Tennessee Titans (2025)*
- * Offseason or practice squad member only

Awards and highlights
- Second-team All-SEC (2017)

Career NFL statistics
- Total tackles: 278
- Sacks: 21.5
- Forced fumbles: 5
- Fumble recoveries: 4
- Pass deflections: 18
- Interceptions: 2
- Touchdowns: 2
- Stats at Pro Football Reference

Lorenzo Lemuel Carter (born December 10, 1995) is an American former professional football player who was a linebacker for seven seasons in the National Football League (NFL) with the New York Giants and Atlanta Falcons. He played college football for the Georgia Bulldogs, and was selected by the Giants in the third round of the 2018 NFL draft.

== Early life ==
Carter attended and played high school football at Norcross High School. He was named to the USA Today All-USA High School Football Team after his senior year in 2013. A 4-star defensive end recruit, Carter committed to Georgia to play college football over offers from Alabama, Florida, LSU, and Notre Dame, among many others.

== College career ==
Carter attended and played college football at the University of Georgia under head coaches Mark Richt and Kirby Smart. As a true freshman at Georgia, Carter played 13 games making 5 starts, and received the University of Georgia newcomer of the year award. After the 2016 season, Carter announced that he would return to school for his senior season, despite speculation that he might declare for the 2017 NFL draft. Carter played in 54 games with 26 starts in his career at Georgia, recording 166 total tackles, 14 sacks, 6 forced fumbles, 6 fumble recoveries, and one defensive touchdown. He was named Second Team All-Southeastern Conference as a senior in 2017.

== Professional career ==
=== Pre-draft ===
Carter attended the NFL Scouting Combine and completed the majority of drills, but opted to skip the bench press, short shuttle, and three-cone drill. Carter was a top performer among all of the edge rushers, finishing first in the broad jump, second in the 40-yard dash, and third among his position group in the vertical jump. On March 21, 2018, Carter participated at Georgia's pro day, but opted to stand on his combine numbers and only performed positional drills. He attended pre-draft visits and private workouts with the San Francisco 49ers, Denver Broncos, and Minnesota Vikings. At the conclusion of the pre-draft process, Carter was projected to be a second round pick by NFL draft experts and scouts. He was ranked as the second best outside linebacker by DraftScout.com and was ranked the fifth best defensive end by Scouts Inc.

Pre-draft measurables
Height	Weight	Arm length	Hand span	Wingspan	40-yard dash	10-yard split	20-yard split	Vertical jump	Broad jump
6 ft 4 7/8 in (1.95 m)	250 lb (113 kg)	34 in (0.86 m)	10 3/8 in (0.26 m)	6 ft 10 in (2.08 m)	4.50 s	1.59 s	2.60 s	36 in (0.91 m)	10 ft 10 in (3.30 m)
All values from NFL Combine

=== New York Giants ===
The New York Giants selected Carter in the third round (66th overall) of the 2018 NFL draft. Carter was the eighth linebacker drafted in 2018.

On May 10, 2018, the Giants signed Carter to a four-year, $4.08 million contract that includes a signing bonus of $1.04 million. In Week 3, against the Houston Texans, Carter recorded his first professional sack.

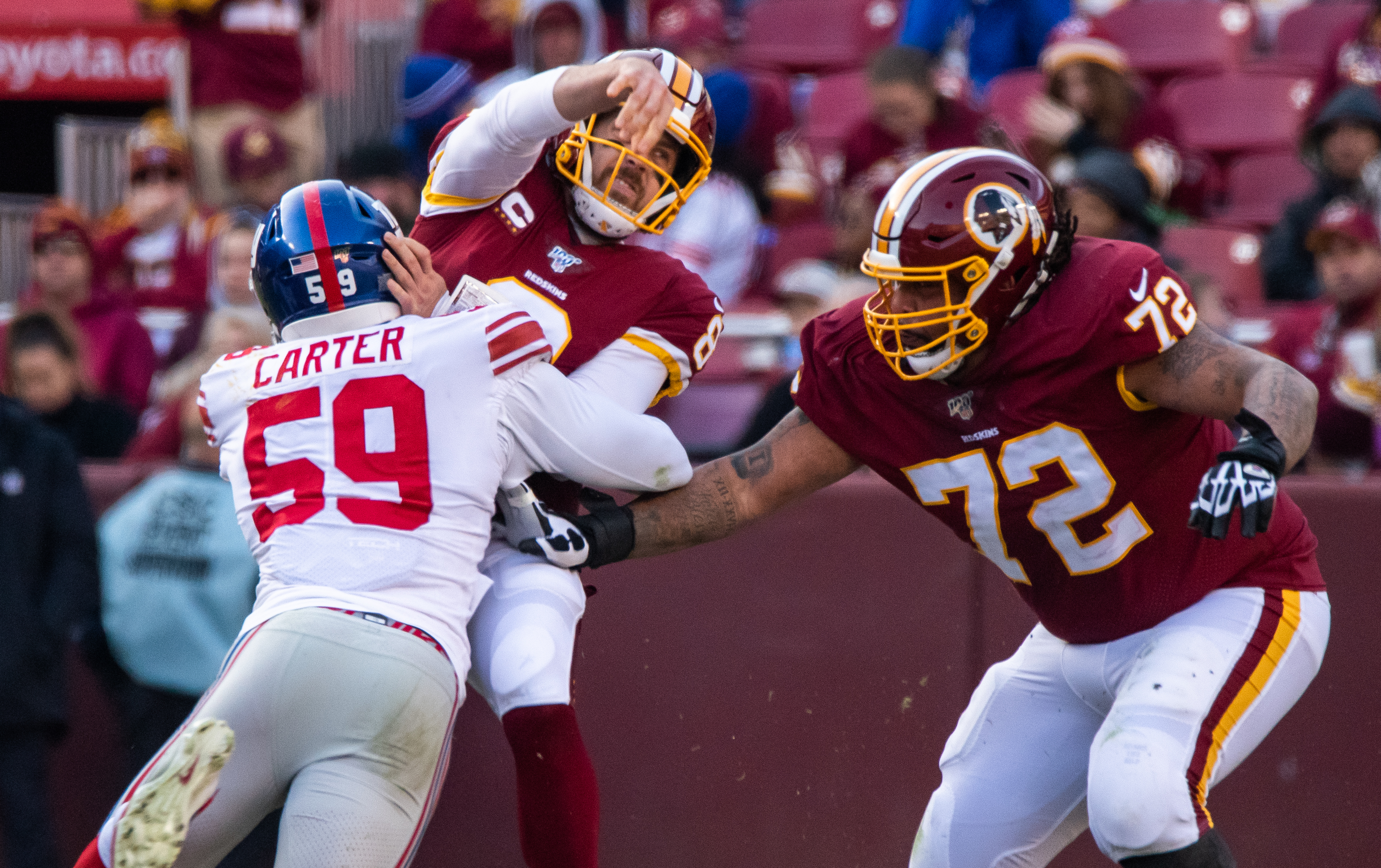
Carter in a game against the Washington Redskins in 2019.

In week 6 of the 2019 season against the New England Patriots, Carter forced a fumble on Tom Brady which was recovered by teammate Markus Golden who returned it for a touchdown in the 35–14 loss. He finished the season second on the team with 4.5 sacks.

Carter entered the 2020 season as one of the Giants starting pass rushers. In Week 5, he suffered a ruptured Achilles and was placed on season-ending injured reserve on October 19.

On Week 5 of the 2021 NFL season against the Dallas Cowboys Carter got his first career interception from Dak Prescott.

=== Atlanta Falcons ===
Carter signed a one-year contract with the Atlanta Falcons on March 22, 2022, worth up to $3.5 million with $2 million guaranteed. In Week 2, against the defending Super Bowl champion Los Angeles Rams, Falcons linebacker Troy Andersen blocked a punt, allowing Carter to pick up the loose ball and run it back to the endzone for a special teams touchdown in the 31–27 loss. In Week 8, against the Carolina Panthers, Carter recorded a pick-six off Panthers quarterback P. J. Walker in the 37–34 win. Overall, Carter started all 17 games for the Falcons in the 2022 season, recording 58 total tackles, 4 sacks, 1 fumble recovery, 1 interception, and a defensive touchdown.

On March 7, 2023, Carter re-signed with the Falcons on a two-year contract worth up to $9 million, with $5.25 million guaranteed. He played in all 17 games with one start during the 2023 season and recorded 35 tackles, 3 sacks, 1 forced fumble, a career high 2 fumble recoveries, and 1 pass deflection.

=== Tennessee Titans ===
On March 20, 2025, Carter signed with the Tennessee Titans. On July 22, Carter announced his retirement from the NFL.
