= 2017 Ole Miss Rebels football team =

American college football season

2017 Ole Miss Rebels football
- Conference: Southeastern Conference
- Western Division
- Record: 6–6 (3–5 SEC)
- Head coach: Matt Luke (1st season)
- Offensive coordinator: Phil Longo (1st season)
- Offensive scheme: Air raid
- Defensive coordinator: Wesley McGriff (2nd season)
- Co-defensive coordinator: Jason Jones (5th season)
- Base defense: Multiple
- Home stadium: Vaught–Hemingway Stadium

2017 Southeastern Conference football standings
	Conf.			Overall
Team	W		L	W		L
Eastern Division
No. 2 Georgia x$^	7	–	1	13	–	2
South Carolina	5	–	3	9	–	4
Kentucky	4	–	4	7	–	6
Missouri	4	–	4	7	–	6
Florida	3	–	5	4	–	7
Vanderbilt	1	–	7	5	–	7
Tennessee	0	–	8	4	–	8
Western Division
No. 10 Auburn xy	7	–	1	10	–	4
No. 1 Alabama x#^	7	–	1	13	–	1
No. 18 LSU	6	–	2	9	–	4
No. 19 Mississippi State	4	–	4	9	–	4
Texas A&M	4	–	4	7	–	6
Ole Miss*	3	–	5	6	–	6
Arkansas	1	–	7	4	–	8
Championship: Georgia 28, Auburn 7
# – College Football Playoff champion; ^ – College Football Playoff participant; $ – Conference champion; x – Division champion/co-champions; y – Championship game participant; * Ole Miss ineligible for postseason due to NCAA sanctions; Rankings from AP Poll

The 2017 Ole Miss Rebels football team represented the University of Mississippi in the 2017 NCAA Division I FBS football season. The Rebels played their home games at Vaught–Hemingway Stadium in Oxford, Mississippi and competed in the Western Division of the Southeastern Conference (SEC). They were led by then-interim head coach Matt Luke. They finished the season 6–6, 3–5 in SEC play to finish in sixth place in the Western Division.

On February 22, 2017, the University of Mississippi self-imposed a one-year ban from post-season play on the Ole Miss football team for the 2017 season, due to alleged NCAA violations. On July 20, 2017, head coach Hugh Freeze resigned in the wake of allegations about repeated calls to a female escort service from his school-issued cell phone. He was given the ultimatum, either resign or be fired.

== Schedule ==
Ole Miss announced its 2017 football schedule on September 13, 2016. The 2017 schedule consists of 7 home and 5 away games in the regular season. The Rebels will host SEC foes Arkansas, LSU, Texas A&M, and Vanderbilt, and will travel to Alabama, Auburn, Kentucky, and Mississippi State.

The Rebels will host three of the four non-conference opponents, Louisiana–Lafayette (ULL) and South Alabama which are both in the Sun Belt Conference and Tennessee-Martin (UT Martin) from the Ohio Valley Conference and will travel to Berkeley to play their first ever Pac-12 Conference opponent, the California Golden Bears.

Date	Time	Opponent	Site	TV	Result	Attendance
September 2	6:30 p.m.	South Alabama*	Vaught–Hemingway Stadium; Oxford, MS	ESPNU	W 47–27	62,532
September 9	11:00 a.m.	UT Martin*	Vaught–Hemingway Stadium; Oxford, MS	SECN	W 45–23	60,476
September 16	9:30 p.m.	at California*	California Memorial Stadium; Berkeley, CA	ESPN	L 16–27	37,125
September 30	8:00 p.m.	at No. 1 Alabama	Bryant–Denny Stadium; Tuscaloosa, AL (rivalry)	ESPN	L 3–66	101,821
October 7	11:00 a.m.	at No. 12 Auburn	Jordan–Hare Stadium; Auburn, AL (rivalry)	SECN	L 23–44	86,700
October 14	2:30 p.m.	Vanderbilt^{†}	Vaught–Hemingway Stadium; Oxford, MS (rivalry)	SECN	W 57–35	60,157
October 21	6:15 p.m.	No. 24 LSU	Vaught–Hemingway Stadium; Oxford, MS (Magnolia Bowl)	ESPN	L 24–40	64,067
October 28	11:00 a.m.	Arkansas	Vaught–Hemingway Stadium; Oxford, MS (rivalry)	SECN	L 37–38	55,684
November 4	3:00 p.m.	at Kentucky	Kroger Field; Lexington, KY	SECN	W 37–34	55,665
November 11	11:00 a.m.	Louisiana*	Vaught–Hemingway Stadium; Oxford, MS	SECN	W 50–22	51,618
November 18	6:00 p.m.	Texas A&M	Vaught–Hemingway Stadium; Oxford, MS	ESPN2	L 24–31	55,880
November 23	6:30 p.m.	at No. 16 Mississippi State	Davis Wade Stadium; Starkville, MS (Egg Bowl)	ESPN	W 31–28	59,345
*Non-conference game; ^{†}Homecoming; Rankings from AP Poll released prior to the game; All times are in Central time

== Roster ==
2017 Ole Miss Rebels Football
Wide receiver: 1 A. J. Brown – SO-1L; 4 Tre Nixon – (redshirt) FR; 5 DaMarkus Lodge – JR-2L; 11 Markell Pack – SR-3L; 12 Van Jefferson – SO-1L; 14 DK Metcalf – SO-1L; 27 Cale Luke – SR-2L; 80 Josh Ricketts – FR-HS; 81 Trey Bledsoe – SR-3L; 82 Jared Farlow – FR-HS; 85 Alex Weber – JR-2L; 86 Walker Rynd – (redshirt) FR; 88 Garrett Styles – FR-HS; Center & Long Snapper: 57 Chadwick Lamar – JR-2L; 58 Mike Taylor – SO-Sq; 61 Eli Johnson – (redshirt) FR; Offensive lineman: 50 Sean Rawlings – JR-2L; 52 Michael Howard – SO-1L; 54 Jack DeFoor – (redshirt) FR; 54 Sam Johnson – SO-Sq; 67 Alex Givens – SO-1L; 68 Chandler Tuitt – (redshirt) FR; 70 Jordan Sims – JR-2L; 71 Bryce Mathews – (redshirt) FR; 72 Royce Newman – (redshirt) FR; 73 Rod Taylor – SR-3L; 74 Greg Little – SO-1L; 76 Daronte Bouldin – SR-3L; 79 Javon Patterson – JR-2L; Tight end: 15 Octavious Cooley – SO-1L; 16 Jacob Mathis – (redshirt) FR; 43 Ty Quick – (redshirt) SR-3L; 83 Gabe Angel – freshman; 84 Nick Haynes – freshman; 85 Dawson Knox – SO-1L	Quarterback: 7 Jason Pellerin – (redshirt) SO-1L; 13 Grant Restmeyer – (redshirt) FR; 16 Graham Lindman – JR-JC; 20 Shea Patterson – SO-1L; Tailback: 21 Keshun Wells – SO-JC; 22 Jordan Wilkins – SR-2L; 26 Eugene Brazley – SR-3L; 24 Eric Swinney – SO-1L; 25 D.K. Buford – JR-2L; 28 D'Vaughn Pennamon – SO-1L; Defensive tackle: 9 Breeland Speaks – JR-2L; 52 Austrian Robinson – (redshirt) SO-1L; 90 Ross Donelly – JR-2L; 95 Benito Jones – SO-1L; 96 Jordan Hebert – JR-2L; 99 Herbert Moore – (redshirt) SR-3L; Defensive end: 14 Victor Evans – JR-2L; 19 Markel Winters – JR-JC; 34 Shawn Curtis – (redshirt) SO-1L; 38 Marquis Haynes – senior; 84 Ty Reyes – (redshirt) FR; 89 Ryder Anderson – FR-HS; 97 Qaadir Sheppard – (redshirt) SO-1L; 98 Charles Wiley – (redshirt) FR; Punter: 94 Will Gleeson – SR-3L; 96 Mac Brown- (redshirt) FR	Defensive back: 2 Deontay Anderson- SO-1L; 4 C.J. Hampton – SR-3L; 5 Ken Webster – SR-3L; 7 Jalen Julius – (redshirt) SO-1L; 15 Myles Hartsfield – SO-1L; 20 Jarrion Street – (redshirt) SO-1L; 21 Javien Hamilton – JR-JC; 23 Breon Dixon – FR-HS; 25 Montrell Custis – (redshirt) SO-1L; 26 C. J. Moore – JR-2L; 28 Cam Ordway – JR-2L; 29 Armani Linton – SO-1L; 30 A. J. Moore – SR-3L; 31 Jaylon Jones – (redshirt) SO-1L; 32 Jerry Johnson – SO-JC; 36 Zedrick Woods – (redshirt) JR-2L; 37 Art Mitchell – SO-HS; 39 Kweisi Fountain – SR-SQ.; Linebacker: 3 DeMarquis Gates – SR-3L; 17 Willie Hibbler – SO-1L; 22 Ray Ray Smith – SR-3L; 24 Tayler Polk – SR-3L; 35 Donta Evans – (redshirt) FR; 41 Brenden Williams – SO-JC; 43 Detric Bing-Dukes- (redshirt) JR-2L; 44 Alex Ashlock – (redshirt) SR-3L; 48 Jack Raborn – (redshirt) JR-2L; 80 Elliot Markuson – SR-3L; Place kicker: 92 Luke Logan – (redshirt) FR; 95 Isaac Way – (redshirt) FR; 97 Gary Wunderlich – SR-3L

=== Depth chart ===
Defense

FS
Deontay Anderson
C.J. Hampton

WLB	MLB	SLB
DeMarquis Gates	Detric Bing-Dukes	Brenden Williams
⋅	Donta Evans	Breon Dixon

SS
Zedrick Woods
Armani Linton

CB
Jaylon Jones
Cam Ordway

DE	DT	DT	DE
Garrald McDowell	Benito Jones	Breeland Speaks	Marquis Haynes
Qaadir Sheppard	Austrian Robinson	Ross Donelly	Victor Evans

CB
Myles Hartsfield
Javien Hamilton

Offense

X-Receiver
A. J. Brown
DaMarkus Lodge

WR
Van Jefferson
Tre Nixon

LT	LG	C	RG	RT
Greg Little	Javon Patterson	Sean Rawlings	Jordan Sims	Alex Givens
Rod Taylor	Daronte Bouldin	Eli Johnson	Jack DeFoor	Bryce Matthews

TE
Octavious Cooley
Dawson Knox

Z-Receiver
DK Metcalf
Markell Pack

QB
Shea Patterson
Jason Pellerin

Special teams
PK Gary Wunderlich
P Will Gleeson

RB
Jordan Wilkins
D'Vaughn Pennamon

== Recruiting ==
=== Recruits ===
The Rebels signed a total of 23 recruits.

College recruiting (2017)
Name	Hometown	School	Height	Weight	Commit date
D.D. Bowie; WR	Morton, Mississippi	Morton HS	6 ft 1 in (1.85 m)	170 lb (77 kg)	Oct 24, 2015
D.D. Bowie; WR	Recruit ratings: Scout: Rivals: 247Sports: ESPN:				
Ben Brown; OT	Vicksburg, Mississippi	St. Aloysius HS	6 ft 6 in (1.98 m)	290 lb (130 kg)	Feb 23, 2016
Ben Brown; OT	Recruit ratings: Scout: Rivals: 247Sports: ESPN:				
Alex Faniel; QB	Richmond, Virginia	Glen Allen HS	6 ft 5 in (1.96 m)	225 lb (102 kg)	Jun 2, 2016
Alex Faniel; QB	Recruit ratings: Scout: Rivals: 247Sports: ESPN:				
Josh Clarke; LB	Jefferson, Louisiana	Riverdale HS	6 ft 3 in (1.91 m)	225 lb (102 kg)	Jun 13, 2016
Josh Clarke; LB	Recruit ratings: Scout: Rivals: 247Sports: ESPN:				
AJ Harris; S	Madison, Alabama	Bob Jones HS	6 ft 0 in (1.83 m)	190 lb (86 kg)	Jul 24, 2016
AJ Harris; S	Recruit ratings: Scout: Rivals: 247Sports: ESPN:				
Jamar Richardson; CB	Aliceville, Alabama	Aliceville HS	6 ft 0 in (1.83 m)	167 lb (76 kg)	Jul 25, 2016
Jamar Richardson; CB	Recruit ratings: Scout: Rivals: 247Sports: ESPN:				
Javien Hamilton; CB	Bay Springs, Mississippi	Bay Springs HS/Jones County Junior College	5 ft 10 in (1.78 m)	170 lb (77 kg)	Aug 6, 2016
Javien Hamilton; CB	Recruit ratings: Scout: Rivals: 247Sports: ESPN:				
Ryder Anderson; DE	Katy, Texas	Katy HS	6 ft 7 in (2.01 m)	230 lb (100 kg)	Nov 28, 2016
Ryder Anderson; DE	Recruit ratings: Scout: Rivals: 247Sports: ESPN:				
Brenden Williams; LB	Fairfield, Alabama	Restoration Academy/Northeast Mississippi Community College	6 ft 4 in (1.93 m)	225 lb (102 kg)	Dec 10, 2016
Brenden Williams; LB	Recruit ratings: Scout: Rivals: 247Sports: ESPN:				
Jordan Ta'amu; QB	Roswell, New Mexico	New Mexico Military Institute	6 ft 3 in (1.91 m)	200 lb (91 kg)	Dec 10, 2016
Jordan Ta'amu; QB	Recruit ratings: Scout: Rivals: 247Sports: ESPN:				
Markel Winters; DE	Tallahassee, Florida	Rickards HS/Jones County CC	6 ft 4 in (1.93 m)	260 lb (120 kg)	Dec 14, 2016
Markel Winters; DE	Recruit ratings: Scout: Rivals: 247Sports: ESPN:				
Breon Dixon; LB	Loganville, Georgia	Grayson HS	6 ft 0 in (1.83 m)	218 lb (99 kg)	Jan 1, 2017
Breon Dixon; LB	Recruit ratings: Scout: Rivals: 247Sports: ESPN:				
Isaiah Woullard; RB	Hattiesburg, Mississippi	Presbyterian Christian School	5 ft 10 in (1.78 m)	205 lb (93 kg)	Jan 31, 2017
Isaiah Woullard; RB	Recruit ratings: Scout: Rivals: 247Sports: ESPN:				
Chester Graves; DE	Kansas City, Missouri	Park Hill HS	6 ft 2 in (1.88 m)	220 lb (100 kg)	Feb 1, 2017
Chester Graves; DE	Recruit ratings: Scout: Rivals: 247Sports: ESPN:				
Mohamed Sanogo; LB	Plano, Texas	Plano West HS	6 ft 2 in (1.88 m)	239 lb (108 kg)	Feb 1, 2017
Mohamed Sanogo; LB	Recruit ratings: Scout: Rivals: 247Sports: ESPN:				
Tony Gray; OT	Loganville, Georgia	Grayson HS	6 ft 5 in (1.96 m)	290 lb (130 kg)	Feb 1, 2017
Tony Gray; OT	Recruit ratings: Scout: Rivals: 247Sports: ESPN:				
C.J. Miller; S	Powder Springs, Georgia	McEachern HS	6 ft 1 in (1.85 m)	188 lb (85 kg)	Feb 1, 2017
C.J. Miller; S	Recruit ratings: Scout: Rivals: 247Sports: ESPN:				
Braylon Sanders; WR	Hogansville, Georgia	Callaway HS	6 ft 1 in (1.85 m)	186 lb (84 kg)	Feb 1, 2017
Braylon Sanders; WR	Recruit ratings: Scout: Rivals: 247Sports: ESPN:				
Taekion Reed; OT	Columbus, Mississippi	New Hope HS	6 ft 4 in (1.93 m)	295 lb (134 kg)	Feb 1, 2017
Taekion Reed; OT	Recruit ratings: Scout: Rivals: 247Sports: ESPN:				
Kam White; DB	Clinton, Mississippi	Clinton HS	6 ft 2 in (1.88 m)	203 lb (92 kg)	Feb 1, 2017
Kam White; DB	Recruit ratings: Scout: Rivals: 247Sports: ESPN:				
JaVonta Payton; WR	Nashville, Tennessee	Hillsboro HS	6 ft 1 in (1.85 m)	170 lb (77 kg)	Feb 1, 2017
JaVonta Payton; WR	Recruit ratings: Scout: Rivals: 247Sports: ESPN:				
Sincere David; DT	Jacksonville, Florida	Sandalwood HS	6 ft 3 in (1.91 m)	300 lb (140 kg)	Feb 1, 2017
Sincere David; DT	Recruit ratings: Scout: Rivals: 247Sports: ESPN:				
Zikerrion Baker; LB	Mooringsport, Louisiana	Minden HS	6 ft 1 in (1.85 m)	210 lb (95 kg)	Feb 1, 2017
Zikerrion Baker; LB	Recruit ratings: Scout: Rivals: 247Sports: ESPN:				
Overall recruit ranking:
Note: In many cases, Scout, Rivals, 247Sports, On3, and ESPN may conflict in their listings of height and weight.; In these cases, the average was taken. ESPN grades are on a 100-point scale.; Sources: "Ole Miss Football Commitments". Rivals.; "2017 Ole Miss Football Commits". Scout.; "ESPN". ESPN.; "Scout.com Team Recruiting Rankings". Scout.; "2017 Team Ranking". Rivals.com.

== Personnel ==
=== Coaching staff ===
- Matt Luke, Interim Head Coach
- Phil Longo, Assistant Coach/offensive coordinator/quarterbacks
- Wesley McGriff, Assistant Coach/defensive coordinator
- Maurice Harris, Assistant Coach/recruiting coordinator For Offense/tight ends
- Jason Jones, Assistant Coach/co-defensive coordinator/secondary
- Jack Bicknell Jr., Assistant Coach/offensive line
- Derrick Nix, Assistant Coach/running backs
- Jacob Peeler, Assistant Coach/wide receivers
- Bradley Dale Peveto, Assistant Coach/linebackers and Special Teams
- Freddie Roach, Assistant Coach/defensive line

== Coaching staff changes ==
After the conclusion of the 2016 season, adjustments throughout the coaching staff were made. After defensive coordinator Dave Wommack announced his retirement from coaching, offensive coordinator Dan Werner was fired. The team would hire Wesley McGriff to replace Wommack as the defensive coordinator, Jacob Peeler to replace Grant Heard as the wide receivers coach, Tray Scott to replace Chris Kiffin as the defensive line coach, and Wesley McGriff (who took over as the defensive coordinator) to also coach the safeties, replacing safeties coach Corey Batoon. Also, assistant athletics director Barney Farrar was relieved of his duties.

== NCAA investigation ==
Following a lengthy investigation, the NCAA issued a Notice of Allegations against the Ole Miss football program in January 2016. The university announced that it had received an amended Notice of Allegations on February 22, 2017.

In total, the NCAA brought 21 distinct charges against the football program, individual coaches and athletic department officials, and boosters. These include fifteen Level I violations (the most serious).

Four of the eleven Level I violations occurred or involved coaches employed prior to Coach Hugh Freeze's tenure. The Level I offenses include:

- Two former coaches conspired with an ACT testing supervisor to manipulate tests so prospective players could qualify.
- Coaches arranged for a booster to provide "free housing, meals and transportation to then football prospective student-athletes" in connection with a program established to help prospects qualify under NCAA guidelines.
- A "huddle leader" who was also a booster under NCAA guidelines provided numerous impermissible benefits to three prospects in 2012 and 2013, including paying for several trips to Ole Miss, lodging, game tickets and concessions, merchandise, tutoring assistance, and ACT exam preparation.
- A booster gave a football player's family member $800.
- A booster provided at least three different prospects with free athletic merchandise.
- A hotel owner in Oxford provided impermissible lodging to various prospects and their friends and family members.
- Two boosters (Boosters 12 and 14) had several improper contacts with a prospect (Student-Athlete 39) and made multiple cash payments to him, totaling between $13,000 and $15,600. The NCAA alleges that an Ole Miss assistant athletic director "initiated and facilitated [Booster 12] and [Booster 14’s] recruiting contact and communication with [Student-Athlete 39], and knew at the time that [Booster 12] and [Booster 14] provided [Student-Athlete 39] with cash payments."
- This assistant athletic director intentionally misled the NCAA concerning these allegations.
- Hugh Freeze "violated NCAA head coach responsibility legislation as he is presumed responsible" for 16 violations "and did not rebut that presumption."
- "[B]etween May and June 2010 and from May 2012 through January 2016, the institution failed to exercise institutional control and monitor the conduct and administration of its athletics program."

Ole Miss announced several self-imposed penalties in May 2017, including a post-season ban in 2017, three years of probation, a reduction of 11 scholarships, and a variety of recruiting restrictions.

The NCAA Committee on Infractions hearing concluded on September 12, 2017.

== Game summaries ==
=== South Alabama ===
	1	2	3	4	Total
Jaguars	0	10	3	14	27
Rebels	10	3	27	7	47

Statistics	USA	MISS
First downs	25	23
Total yards	374	531
Rushing yards	170	102
Passing yards	204	429
Turnovers	0	1
Time of possession	31:51	28:09

Team	Category	Player	Statistics
South Alabama	Passing	Cole Garvin	19/31, 204 yards, TD
South Alabama	Rushing	Tra Minter	12 rushes, 83 yards
South Alabama	Receiving	Samory Collier	4 receptions, 43 yards
Ole Miss	Passing	Shea Patterson	28/35, 429 yards, 4 TD
Ole Miss	Rushing	D'Vaughn Pennamon	7 rushes, 34 yards, TD
Ole Miss	Receiving	A. J. Brown	8 receptions, 233 yards, 2 TD

=== UT Martin ===
	1	2	3	4	Total
Skyhawks	9	7	0	7	23
Rebels	7	10	21	7	45

Statistics	UTM	MISS
First downs	14	24
Total yards	334	543
Rushing yards	219	54
Passing yards	115	489
Turnovers	1	1
Time of possession	37:07	22:53

Team	Category	Player	Statistics
UT Martin	Passing	Troy Cook	9/15, 92 yards, INT
UT Martin	Rushing	LaDarius Galloway	24 rushes, 188 yards, TD
UT Martin	Receiving	Jaylon Moore	3 receptions, 42 yards
Ole Miss	Passing	Shea Patterson	32/43, 489 yards, 5 TD, INT
Ole Miss	Rushing	Jordan Wilkins	9 rushes, 36 yards, TD
Ole Miss	Receiving	A. J. Brown	8 receptions, 156 yards, 2 TD

=== At California ===
	1	2	3	4	Total
Rebels	10	6	0	0	16
Golden Bears	7	0	10	10	27

Statistics	MISS	CAL
First downs	19	25
Total yards	416	399
Rushing yards	53	163
Passing yards	363	236
Turnovers	3	2
Time of possession	27:07	32:53

Team	Category	Player	Statistics
Ole Miss	Passing	Shea Patterson	26/44, 363 yards, 2 TD, 3 INT
Ole Miss	Rushing	Jordan Wilkins	11 rushes, 38 yards
Ole Miss	Receiving	DK Metcalf	3 receptions, 125 yards, TD
California	Passing	Ross Bowers	24/47, 236 yards, TD, 2 INT
California	Rushing	Patrick Laird	22 rushes, 78 yards, TD
California	Receiving	Kanawai Noa	6 receptions, 81 yards

=== At No. 1 Alabama ===
	1	2	3	4	Total
Rebels	3	0	0	0	3
No. 1 Crimson Tide	21	14	24	7	66

Statistics	MISS	ALA
First downs	11	26
Total yards	253	613
Rushing yards	88	365
Passing yards	165	248
Turnovers	2	0
Time of possession	23:23	36:37

Team	Category	Player	Statistics
Ole Miss	Passing	Shea Patterson	14/29, 165 yards, 2 INT
Ole Miss	Rushing	Jordan Wilkins	12 rushes, 101 yards
Ole Miss	Receiving	DaMarkus Lodge	2 receptions, 72 yards
Alabama	Passing	Jalen Hurts	12/19, 197 yards, 2 TD
Alabama	Rushing	Jalen Hurts	10 rushes, 101 yards, TD
Alabama	Receiving	Cam Sims	1 reception, 60 yards

=== At No. 12 Auburn ===
	1	2	3	4	Total
Rebels	3	0	7	13	23
No. 12 Tigers	14	21	6	3	44

Statistics	MISS	AUB
First downs	23	25
Total yards	429	561
Rushing yards	83	326
Passing yards	346	235
Turnovers	0	0
Time of possession	27:52	32:08

Team	Category	Player	Statistics
Ole Miss	Passing	Shea Patterson	34/51, 346 yards, 2 TD
Ole Miss	Rushing	Jordan Wilkins	13 rushes, 65 yards, TD
Ole Miss	Receiving	A. J. Brown	10 receptions, 109 yards
Auburn	Passing	Jarrett Stidham	14/21, 235 yards, 2 TD
Auburn	Rushing	Kerryon Johnson	28 rushes, 204 yards, 3 TD
Auburn	Receiving	Ryan Davis	2 receptions, 75 yards, TD

=== Vanderbilt ===
	1	2	3	4	Total
Commodores	0	21	0	14	35
Rebels	7	28	12	10	57

Statistics	VAN	MISS
First downs	21	27
Total yards	417	603
Rushing yards	188	252
Passing yards	229	351
Turnovers	2	0
Time of possession	31:49	28:11

Team	Category	Player	Statistics
Vanderbilt	Passing	Kyle Shurmur	13/29, 174 yards, 2 TD, INT
Vanderbilt	Rushing	Ralph Webb	23 rushes, 163 yards, 2 TD
Vanderbilt	Receiving	Trent Sherfield	3 receptions, 65 yards, TD
Ole Miss	Passing	Shea Patterson	22/35, 351 yards, 4 TD
Ole Miss	Rushing	Jordan Wilkins	18 rushes, 113 yards, TD
Ole Miss	Receiving	A. J. Brown	8 receptions, 174 yards, 2 TD

=== No. 24 LSU ===
	1	2	3	4	Total
No. 24 Tigers	10	3	17	10	40
Rebels	3	3	10	8	24

Statistics	LSU	MISS
First downs	26	21
Total yards	593	347
Rushing yards	393	153
Passing yards	200	194
Turnovers	0	3
Time of possession	37:40	22:20

Team	Category	Player	Statistics
LSU	Passing	Danny Etling	9/13, 200 yards, 2 TD
LSU	Rushing	Derrius Guice	22 rushes, 276 yards, TD
LSU	Receiving	Darrel Williams	4 receptions, 105 yards
Ole Miss	Passing	Shea Patterson	10/23, 116 yards, 3 INT
Ole Miss	Rushing	Jordan Wilkins	13 rushes, 86 yards, TD
Ole Miss	Receiving	Dawson Knox	5 receptions, 72 yards

=== Arkansas ===
	1	2	3	4	Total
Razorbacks	7	14	7	10	38
Rebels	21	10	0	6	37

Statistics	ARK	MISS
First downs	27	22
Total yards	449	566
Rushing yards	260	198
Passing yards	189	368
Turnovers	2	3
Time of possession	40:27	19:33

Team	Category	Player	Statistics
Arkansas	Passing	Cole Kelley	19/30, 189 yards, 3 TD, INT
Arkansas	Rushing	T. J. Hammonds	11 rushes, 84 yards
Arkansas	Receiving	Deon Stewart	4 receptions, 49 yards, TD
Ole Miss	Passing	Jordan Ta'amu	20/30, 368 yards, INT
Ole Miss	Rushing	Jordan Wilkins	16 rushes, 118 yards, TD
Ole Miss	Receiving	DK Metcalf	4 receptions, 107 yards

=== At Kentucky ===
	1	2	3	4	Total
Rebels	7	10	10	10	37
Wildcats	3	17	7	7	34

Statistics	MISS	UK
First downs	25	23
Total yards	473	455
Rushing yards	91	219
Passing yards	382	236
Turnovers	0	0
Time of possession	23:40	36:20

Team	Category	Player	Statistics
Ole Miss	Passing	Jordan Ta'amu	31/40, 382 yards, 4 TD
Ole Miss	Rushing	Jordan Wilkins	8 rushes, 44 yards
Ole Miss	Receiving	DK Metcalf	5 receptions, 83 yards, 2 TD
Kentucky	Passing	Stephen Johnson	19/24, 204 yards, TD
Kentucky	Rushing	Benny Snell	28 rushes, 176 yards, 3 TD
Kentucky	Receiving	C. J. Conrad	5 receptions, 75 yards, TD

=== Louisiana ===
	1	2	3	4	Total
Ragin' Cajuns	0	10	0	12	22
Rebels	21	14	7	8	50

Statistics	ULL	MISS
First downs	21	30
Total yards	427	641
Rushing yards	228	223
Passing yards	199	418
Turnovers	0	1
Time of possession	30:16	29:44

Team	Category	Player	Statistics
Louisiana	Passing	Levi Lewis	14/26, 166 yards
Louisiana	Rushing	Jordan Davis	4 rushes, 52 yards, TD
Louisiana	Receiving	Ja'Marcus Bradley	7 receptions, 105 yards
Ole Miss	Passing	Jordan Ta'amu	28/36, 418 yards, 3 TD, INT
Ole Miss	Rushing	Jordan Wilkins	14 rushes, 124 yards, TD
Ole Miss	Receiving	A. J. Brown	14 receptions, 185 yards, 2 TD

=== Texas A&M ===
	1	2	3	4	Total
Aggies	14	7	7	3	31
Rebels	14	10	0	0	24

Statistics	TAMU	MISS
First downs	18	19
Total yards	391	391
Rushing yards	119	202
Passing yards	272	189
Turnovers	1	2
Time of possession	32:47	27:13

Team	Category	Player	Statistics
Texas A&M	Passing	Nick Starkel	19/32, 272 yards, TD, INT
Texas A&M	Rushing	Trayveon Williams	26 rushes, 75 yards
Texas A&M	Receiving	Damion Ratley	5 receptions, 111 yards, TD
Ole Miss	Passing	Jordan Ta'amu	19/34, 189 yards, 2 TD, INT
Ole Miss	Rushing	Jordan Wilkins	19 rushes, 147 yards, TD
Ole Miss	Receiving	A. J. Brown	7 receptions, 70 yards, TD

=== At No. 16 Mississippi State ===
	1	2	3	4	Total
Rebels	7	3	14	7	31
No. 16 Bulldogs	0	6	0	22	28

Statistics	MISS	MSST
First downs	11	27
Total yards	355	501
Rushing yards	108	294
Passing yards	247	207
Turnovers	2	5
Time of possession	22:30	37:30

Team	Category	Player	Statistics
Ole Miss	Passing	Jordan Ta'amu	10/22, 247 yards, 2 TD, INT
Ole Miss	Rushing	Jordan Wilkins	14 rushes, 110 yards, 2 TD
Ole Miss	Receiving	A. J. Brown	6 receptions, 167 yards, TD
Mississippi State	Passing	Keytaon Thompson	13/27, 195 yards, TD, INT
Mississippi State	Rushing	Keytaon Thompson	26 rushes, 121 yards, TD
Mississippi State	Receiving	Jordan Thomas	4 receptions, 65 yards
