= 2019 Ole Miss Rebels football team =

American college football season

2019 Ole Miss Rebels football
- Conference: Southeastern Conference
- Western Division
- Record: 4–8 (2–6 SEC)
- Head coach: Matt Luke (3rd season)
- Offensive coordinator: Rich Rodriguez (1st season)
- Offensive scheme: Spread option
- Defensive coordinator: Mike MacIntyre (1st season)
- Base defense: 3–4
- Home stadium: Vaught–Hemingway Stadium

2019 Southeastern Conference football standings
	Conf.			Overall
Team	W		L	W		L
Eastern Division
No. 4 Georgia x	7	–	1	12	–	2
No. 6 Florida	6	–	2	11	–	2
Tennessee *	5	–	3	8	–	5
Kentucky	3	–	5	8	–	5
Missouri *	3	–	5	6	–	6
South Carolina	3	–	5	4	–	8
Vanderbilt	1	–	7	3	–	9
Western Division
No. 1 LSU x$#^	8	–	0	15	–	0
No. 8 Alabama	6	–	2	11	–	2
No. 14 Auburn	5	–	3	9	–	4
Texas A&M	4	–	4	8	–	5
Mississippi State	3	–	5	6	–	7
Ole Miss	2	–	6	4	–	8
Arkansas	0	–	8	2	–	10
Championship: LSU 37, Georgia 10
# – College Football Playoff champion; ^ – College Football Playoff participant; $ – Conference champion; x – Division champion/co-champions; * – Tennessee vacated all wins due to NCAA violations. Missouri was ineligible for postseason due to NCAA sanctions.; Rankings from AP Poll

The 2019 Ole Miss Rebels football team represented The University of Mississippi in the 2019 NCAA Division I FBS football season. The Rebels played their home games at Vaught–Hemingway Stadium in Oxford, Mississippi and competed in the Western Division of the Southeastern Conference (SEC). They were led by third-year head coach Matt Luke.

== Preseason ==
=== Coaching changes ===
Head coach Matt Luke bolstered his coaching staff with the hiring of two former Power 5 head coaches to coordinator positions prior to the 2019 season. The school announced the hiring of Mike MacIntyre to be the new defensive coordinator on December 10, 2018, and announced the hiring of Rich Rodriguez as the new offensive coordinator on December 31. MacIntyre had spent the previous six seasons as the head coach at Colorado and replaced 2018 co-defensive coordinators Wesley McGriff and Jason Jones, who both parted ways with Ole Miss. Rodriguez was most recently the head coach of Arizona, leaving after the 2017 season, and has also coached at West Virginia and Michigan. He replaced former offensive coordinator Phil Longo, who left to assume the same role at North Carolina.

=== Award watch lists ===
Listed in the order that they were released

Award	Player	Position	Year
Maxwell Award	Scottie Phillips	RB	SR
Doak Walker Award	Scottie Phillips	RB	SR
John Mackey Award	Octavious Cooley	TE	SR
Butkus Award	Mohamed Sanogo	LB	JR
Lou Groza Award	Luke Logan	K	JR
Wuerffel Trophy	Mac Brown	P	JR

=== SEC media poll ===
The SEC media poll was released on July 19, 2019 with the Rebels predicted to finish in sixth place in the West Division.

=== Recruiting ===
The Rebels' 2019 recruiting class finished at 22nd in the nation and 9th in the SEC, according to 247Sports.com.

College recruiting (2019)
Name	Hometown	School	Height	Weight	Commit date
Jerrion Ealy #3 RB	Flowood, MS	Jackson Prep	5 ft 10 in (1.78 m)	200 lb (91 kg)	Feb 6, 2019
Jerrion Ealy #3 RB	Recruit ratings: Scout: Rivals: 247Sports: ESPN:				
Dannis Jackson; WR	Sumrall, MS	Sumrall	6 ft 1 in (1.85 m)	187 lb (85 kg)	Jul 30, 2018
Dannis Jackson; WR	Recruit ratings: Scout: Rivals: 247Sports: ESPN:				
Jonathan Mingo; WR	Brandon, MS	Brandon	6 ft 2 in (1.88 m)	200 lb (91 kg)	Jul 31, 2018
Jonathan Mingo; WR	Recruit ratings: Scout: Rivals: 247Sports: ESPN:				
Lakia Henry #1 JUCO ILB	Vidalia, GA	Dodge City C.C.	6 ft 0 in (1.83 m)	225 lb (102 kg)	Feb 6, 2019
Lakia Henry #1 JUCO ILB	Recruit ratings: Scout: Rivals: 247Sports: ESPN:				
Darius Thomas; OT	Jonesboro, AR	Jonesboro	6 ft 6 in (1.98 m)	340 lb (150 kg)	Jul 31, 2018
Darius Thomas; OT	Recruit ratings: Scout: Rivals: 247Sports: ESPN:				
Sam Williams; DE	Montgomery, AL	Northeast Mississippi C.C.	6 ft 4.5 in (1.94 m)	250 lb (110 kg)	Jun 21, 2018
Sam Williams; DE	Recruit ratings: Scout: Rivals: 247Sports: ESPN:				
John Rhys Plumlee; ATH	Hattiesburg, MS	Oak Grove	6 ft 1 in (1.85 m)	185 lb (84 kg)	Feb 4, 2019
John Rhys Plumlee; ATH	Recruit ratings: Scout: Rivals: 247Sports: ESPN:				
Grant Tisdale; QB	Allen, TX	Allen	6 ft 1 in (1.85 m)	204 lb (93 kg)	Apr 6, 2018
Grant Tisdale; QB	Recruit ratings: Scout: Rivals: 247Sports: ESPN:				
Nick Broeker; OT	Springfield, IL	Sacred Heart-Griffin	6 ft 6 in (1.98 m)	288 lb (131 kg)	Jun 14, 2018
Nick Broeker; OT	Recruit ratings: Scout: Rivals: 247Sports: ESPN:				
Jadon Jackson; WR	Centerton, AR	Bentonville West	6 ft 1.5 in (1.87 m)	180 lb (82 kg)	Sep 13, 2018
Jadon Jackson; WR	Recruit ratings: Scout: Rivals: 247Sports: ESPN:				
Deantre Prince; ATH	Charleston, MS	Charleston	6 ft 1 in (1.85 m)	170 lb (77 kg)	Jun 21, 2018
Deantre Prince; ATH	Recruit ratings: Scout: Rivals: 247Sports: ESPN:				
LeDarrius Cox; DT	Mobile, AL	McGill-Toolen	6 ft 5 in (1.96 m)	312 lb (142 kg)	Feb 6, 2019
LeDarrius Cox; DT	Recruit ratings: Scout: Rivals: 247Sports: ESPN:				
Patrick Lucas; DT	Wetumpka, AL	Wetumpka	6 ft 3 in (1.91 m)	290 lb (130 kg)	Jul 9, 2018
Patrick Lucas; DT	Recruit ratings: Scout: Rivals: 247Sports: ESPN:				
Jonathan Haynes; S	Benoit, MS	Jones County J.C.	6 ft 0 in (1.83 m)	205 lb (93 kg)	Jul 11, 2018
Jonathan Haynes; S	Recruit ratings: Scout: Rivals: 247Sports: ESPN:				
Jordan Jernigan; WR	Tupelo, MS	Tupelo	6 ft 1 in (1.85 m)	193 lb (88 kg)	Nov 26, 2017
Jordan Jernigan; WR	Recruit ratings: Scout: Rivals: 247Sports: ESPN:				
Brandon Mack; DE	Montgomery, AL	Jefferson Davis	6 ft 4 in (1.93 m)	240 lb (110 kg)	Dec 29, 2018
Brandon Mack; DE	Recruit ratings: Scout: Rivals: 247Sports: ESPN:				
Jeremy James; OT	Cumming, GA	North Forsyth	6 ft 5 in (1.96 m)	315 lb (143 kg)	Jun 28, 2018
Jeremy James; OT	Recruit ratings: Scout: Rivals: 247Sports: ESPN:				
Reece McIntyre; OT	Buford, GA	Buford	6 ft 5 in (1.96 m)	290 lb (130 kg)	Jun 25, 2018
Reece McIntyre; OT	Recruit ratings: Scout: Rivals: 247Sports: ESPN:				
A. J. Finley; S	Mobile, AL	St. Paul's Episcopal	6 ft 2 in (1.88 m)	195 lb (88 kg)	Jun 28, 2018
A. J. Finley; S	Recruit ratings: Scout: Rivals: 247Sports: ESPN:				
Ashanti Cistrunk; OLB	Louisville, MS	Louisville	6 ft 2 in (1.88 m)	205 lb (93 kg)	Apr 9, 2018
Ashanti Cistrunk; OLB	Recruit ratings: Scout: Rivals: 247Sports: ESPN:				
Dontario Drummond; WR	Laurel, MS	East Mississippi C.C.	6 ft 2 in (1.88 m)	200 lb (91 kg)	Dec 19, 2018
Dontario Drummond; WR	Recruit ratings: Scout: Rivals: 247Sports: ESPN:				
Jamar Richardson; CB	Aliceville, AL	Jones County J.C.	6 ft 0 in (1.83 m)	185 lb (84 kg)	Feb 7, 2018
Jamar Richardson; CB	Recruit ratings: Scout: Rivals: 247Sports: ESPN:				
Jalen Jordan; CB	Lake Cormorant, MS	Lake Cormorant	5 ft 10 in (1.78 m)	185 lb (84 kg)	Feb 12, 2018
Jalen Jordan; CB	Recruit ratings: Scout: Rivals: 247Sports: ESPN:				
Jarod Conner; RB	Hattiesburg, MS	Hattiesburg	5 ft 11 in (1.80 m)	210 lb (95 kg)	Dec 7, 2018
Jarod Conner; RB	Recruit ratings: Scout: Rivals: 247Sports: ESPN:				
Jay Stanley; OLB	Brandon, MS	Brandon	6 ft 2 in (1.88 m)	195 lb (88 kg)	Jun 24, 2018
Jay Stanley; OLB	Recruit ratings: Scout: Rivals: 247Sports: ESPN:				
Bryce Ramsey; OG	Gulfport, MS	Harrison Central	6 ft 1.5 in (1.87 m)	336 lb (152 kg)	Mar 7, 2018
Bryce Ramsey; OG	Recruit ratings: Scout: Rivals: 247Sports: ESPN:				
Caleb Warren; OT	Louisville, MS	Nanih Waiya Attendance Center	6 ft 4 in (1.93 m)	305 lb (138 kg)	Jun 21, 2018
Caleb Warren; OT	Recruit ratings: Scout: Rivals: 247Sports: ESPN:				
Carter Colquitt; OT	Buford, GA	Buford	6 ft 5 in (1.96 m)	300 lb (140 kg)	Jun 18, 2018
Carter Colquitt; OT	Recruit ratings: Scout: Rivals: 247Sports: ESPN:				
Kinkead Dent; QB	Flowood, MS	Jackson Academy	6 ft 5 in (1.96 m)	205 lb (93 kg)	Nov 13, 2018
Kinkead Dent; QB	Recruit ratings: Scout: Rivals: 247Sports: ESPN:				
Tavario Standifer; S	Tupelo, MS	Tupelo	6 ft 2 in (1.88 m)	208 lb (94 kg)	Dec 4, 2017
Tavario Standifer; S	Recruit ratings: Scout: Rivals: 247Sports: ESPN:				
Eric Jeffries; OLB	Oxford, MS	Lafayette	6 ft 3 in (1.91 m)	228 lb (103 kg)	Jul 30, 2018
Eric Jeffries; OLB	Recruit ratings: Scout: Rivals: 247Sports: ESPN:				
Overall recruit ranking: Rivals: 22 247Sports: 22 ESPN: 21
Note: In many cases, Scout, Rivals, 247Sports, On3, and ESPN may conflict in their listings of height and weight.; In these cases, the average was taken. ESPN grades are on a 100-point scale.; Sources: "2019 Team Ranking". Rivals.com.

== Schedule ==
Ole Miss announced its 2019 football schedule on September 18, 2018. The 2019 schedule consisted of 7 home and 5 away games in the regular season. The Rebels would host SEC opponents Arkansas, Vanderbilt, Texas A&M, and LSU, and would travel to Alabama, Missouri, Auburn, and Mississippi State.

The Rebels opened the 2019 season on the road against rivals, Memphis from The American. The Rebels then hosted Southeastern Louisiana from the FCS on September 14. The first ever Pac-12 team visited Oxford on September 21 when California played the Rebels. The Rebels would play their final non-conference game on November 9 against FBS Independent, New Mexico State.

Date	Time	Opponent	Site	TV	Result	Attendance
August 31	11:00 a.m.	at Memphis*	Liberty Bowl Memorial Stadium; Memphis, TN (rivalry)	ABC	L 10–15	44,107
September 7	6:30 p.m.	Arkansas	Vaught–Hemingway Stadium; Oxford, MS (rivalry)	SECN	W 31–17	47,915
September 14	3:00 p.m.	No. 23 (FCS) Southeastern Louisiana*	Vaught–Hemingway Stadium; Oxford, MS	SECN	W 40–29	45,238
September 21	11:00 a.m.	No. 23 California*	Vaught–Hemingway Stadium; Oxford, MS	ESPNU	L 20–28	46,850
September 28	2:30 p.m.	at No. 2 Alabama	Bryant–Denny Stadium; Tuscaloosa, AL (rivalry)	CBS	L 31–59	99,590
October 5	6:30 p.m.	Vanderbilt^{†}	Vaught–Hemingway Stadium; Oxford, MS (rivalry)	SECN	W 31–6	47,601
October 12	6:00 p.m.	at Missouri	Faurot Field; Columbia, MO	ESPN2	L 27–38	62,621
October 19	6:30 p.m.	Texas A&M	Vaught–Hemingway Stadium; Oxford, MS	SECN	L 17–24	50,257
November 2	6:00 p.m.	at No. 11 Auburn	Jordan–Hare Stadium; Auburn, AL (rivalry)	ESPN	L 14–20	87,457
November 9	3:00 p.m.	New Mexico State*	Vaught–Hemingway Stadium; Oxford, MS	SECN	W 41–3	45,973
November 16	6:00 p.m.	No. 1 LSU	Vaught–Hemingway Stadium; Oxford, MS (Magnolia Bowl / SEC Nation)	ESPN	L 37–58	53,797
November 28	6:30 p.m.	at Mississippi State	Davis Wade Stadium; Starkville, MS (Egg Bowl)	ESPN	L 20–21	57,529
*Non-conference game; ^{†}Homecoming; Rankings from AP Poll and CFP Rankings after November 5 released prior to game; All times are in Central time

Schedule source:

== Game summaries ==
=== At Memphis ===
Uniform Combination
Helmet	Jersey	Pants

Ole Miss Rebels (0–0) at Memphis Tigers (0–0)

Quarter	1	2	3	4	Total
Rebels	0	0	3	7	10
Tigers	7	6	0	2	15

at Liberty Bowl Memorial Stadium • Memphis, TN

- Date: Saturday, August 31, 2019
- Game time: 11:00 a.m. CDT
- Game weather: Partly Cloudy • Temperature: 82 °F (28 °C)
- Game attendance: 44,107
- Referee: John McDaid
- TV announcers (ABC): Mark Jones (play-by-play), Dusty Dvoracek (analyst), Olivia Dekker (sideline)

Game information

First Quarter

- (5:23) MEM – Brady White 1 yard rush, Riley Patterson kick
  Memphis 7–0; 13 plays, 74 yards, 6:00

Second Quarter

- (0:40) MEM – Patrick Taylor 1 yard rush, PAT failed
  Memphis 13–0; 7 plays, 37 yards, 3:19

Third Quarter

- (3:11) MISS – Luke Logan 35 yard field goal
  Memphis 13–3; 11 plays, 65 yards, 3:50

Fourth Quarter

- (11:49) MISS – Scottie Phillips 1 yard rush, Luke Logan kick
  Memphis 13–10; 10 plays, 55 yards, 4:17
- (6:27) MEM – Team Safety
  Memphis 15–10

Statistics	MISS	MEM
First downs	13	22
Total yards	173	364
Rushes/yards	33/80	51/192
Passing yards	93	172
Passing: Comp–Att–Int	9–19–1	23–31–1
Time of possession	21:19	38:41

Team	Category	Player	Statistics
Ole Miss	Passing	Matt Corral	9/19, 93 yards, 1 INT
Ole Miss	Rushing	Scottie Phillips	19 carries, 62 yards, 1 TD
Ole Miss	Receiving	Elijah Moore	4 receptions, 60 yards
Memphis	Passing	Brady White	23/31, 172 yards, 1 INT
Memphis	Rushing	Patrick Taylor	27 carries, 128 yards, 1 TD
Memphis	Receiving	Damonte Coxie	6 receptions, 44 yards

=== Arkansas ===
Uniform Combination
Helmet	Jersey	Pants

Arkansas Razorbacks (1–0) at Ole Miss Rebels (0–1)

Quarter	1	2	3	4	Total
Razorbacks	0	3	0	14	17
Rebels	7	3	7	14	31

at Vaught–Hemingway Stadium • Oxford, MS

- Date: Saturday, September 7, 2019
- Game time: 6:30 p.m. CDT
- Game weather: Clear • Temperature: 94 °F (34 °C)
- Game attendance: 47,915
- Referee: Matt Loeffler
- TV announcers (SEC Network): Tom Hart (play-by-play), Jordan Rodgers (analyst), Cole Cubelic (sideline)

Game information

First Quarter

- (8:41) MISS – Elijah Moore 2 yard pass from Matt Corral, Luke Logan kick
  Ole Miss 7–0; 13 plays, 85 yards, 4:35

Second Quarter

- (8:19) ARK – Connor Limpert 36 yard field goal
  Ole Miss 7–3; 7 plays, 36 yards, 3:11
- (2:24) MISS – Luke Logan 33 yard field goal
  Ole Miss 10–3; 7 plays, 31 yards, 3:06

Third Quarter

- (2:34) MISS – Scottie Phillips 1 yard rush, Luke Logan kick
  Ole Miss 17–3; 8 plays, 71 yards, 2:59

Fourth Quarter

- (13:31) ARK – Kamren Curl 69 yard fumble return, Connor Limpert kick
  Ole Miss 17–10
- (11:09) MISS – Elijah Moore 46 yard pass from Matt Corral, Luke Logan kick
  Ole Miss 24–10; 5 plays, 74 yards, 2:17
- (6:03) MISS – Scottie Phillips 26 yard rush, Luke Logan kick
  Ole Miss 31–10; 5 plays, 66 yards, 3:05
- (1:21) ARK – Koilan Jackson 6 yard pass from Nick Starkel, Connor Limpert kick
  Ole Miss 31–17; 7 plays, 81 yards, 2:06

Statistics	ARK	MISS
First downs	18	23
Total yards	361	483
Rushes/yards	26/61	53/237
Passing yards	300	246
Passing: Comp–Att–Int	25–41–0	16–24–0
Time of possession	27:32	32:28

Team	Category	Player	Statistics
Arkansas	Passing	Nick Starkel	17/24, 201 yards, 1 TD
Arkansas	Rushing	Rakeem Boyd	17 carries, 67 yards
Arkansas	Receiving	Trey Knox	6 receptions, 88 yards
Ole Miss	Passing	Matt Corral	16/24, 246 yards, 2 TD
Ole Miss	Rushing	Scottie Phillips	26 yards, 143 yards, 2 TD
Ole Miss	Receiving	Elijah Moore	7 receptions, 130 yards, 2 TD

=== No. 23 (FCS) Southeastern Louisiana ===
Uniform Combination
Helmet	Jersey	Pants

No. 23 (FCS) Southeastern Louisiana Lions (1–0) at Ole Miss Rebels (1–1)

Quarter	1	2	3	4	Total
No. 23 (FCS) Lions	3	14	12	0	29
Rebels	13	14	7	6	40

at Vaught–Hemingway Stadium • Oxford, MS

- Date: Saturday, September 14, 2019
- Game time: 3:00 p.m. CDT
- Game weather: Sunny • Temperature: 92 °F (33 °C)
- Game attendance: 45,238
- Referee: James Carter
- TV announcers (SEC Network): Mike Morgan (play-by-play), Tom Ramsey (analyst), Taylor Davis (sideline)

Game information

First Quarter

- (11:01) MISS – Elijah Moore 9 yard pass from Matt Corral, Luke Logan missed kick
  Ole Miss 6–0; 12 plays, 72 yards, 3:59
- (6:47) SELA – Bryce Broussard 30 yard field goal
  Ole Miss 6–3; 8 plays, 29 yards, 2:29
- (6:33) MISS – Jerrion Ealy 94 yard kickoff return, Luke Logan kick
  Ole Miss 13–6

Second Quarter

- (13:12) SELA – Marcus Cooper 14 yard rush, Bryce Broussard kick
  Ole Miss 13–10; 5 plays, 57 yards, 2:05
- (12:28) MISS – Jerrion Ealy 30 yard rush, Luke Logan kick
  Ole Miss 20–10; 2 plays, 82 yards, 0:39
- (6:29) SELA – Devonte Williams 20 yard rush, Bryce Broussard kick
  Ole Miss 20–17; 10 plays, 74 yards, 4:33
- (0:54) MISS – Jason Pellerin 5 yard pass from Matt Corral, Luke Logan kick
  Ole Miss 27–17; 9 plays, 52 yards, 3:35

Third Quarter

- (10:27) MISS – Scottie Phillips 27 yard rush, Luke Logan kick
  Ole Miss 34–17; 9 plays, 69 yards, 3:00
- (6:11) SELA – Juwan Petit-Frere 45 yard pass from Chason Virgil, Bryce Broussard kick missed
  Ole Miss 34–23; 9 plays, 78 yards, 4:10
- (1:26) SELA – Bransen Schwebel 5 yard pass from Chason Virgil, Two-point conversion failed
  Ole Miss 34–29; 2 plays, 9 yards, 0:42

Fourth Quarter

- (10:38) MISS – Luke Logan 22 yard field goal
  Ole Miss 37–29; 14 plays, 78 yards, 5:43
- (0:39) MISS – Luke Logan 32 yard field goal
  Ole Miss 40–29; 10 plays, 69 yards, 4:39

Statistics	SELA	MISS
First downs	20	24
Total yards	375	459
Rushes/yards	24/66	50/220
Passing yards	309	239
Passing: Comp–Att–Int	29–45–3	21–30–0
Time of possession	27:56	32:04

Team	Category	Player	Statistics
Southeastern; Louisiana	Passing	Chason Virgil	29/44, 309 yards, 2 TD, 3 INT
Southeastern; Louisiana	Rushing	Devonte Williams	13 carries, 50 yards, 1 TD
Southeastern; Louisiana	Receiving	Juwan Petit-Frere	3 receptions, 74 yards, 1 TD
Ole Miss	Passing	Matt Corral	21/30, 239 yards, 2 TD
Ole Miss	Rushing	Scottie Phillips	26 carries, 103 yards, 1 TD
Ole Miss	Receiving	Elijah Moore	7 receptions, 88 yards, 1 TD

=== No. 23 California ===
Uniform Combination
Helmet	Jersey	Pants

No. 23 California Golden Bears (3–0) at Ole Miss Rebels (2–1)

Quarter	1	2	3	4	Total
No. 23 Golden Bears	7	7	14	0	28
Rebels	7	6	0	7	20

at Vaught–Hemingway Stadium • Oxford, MS

- Date: Saturday, September 21, 2019
- Game time: 11:00 a.m. CDT
- Game weather: Sunny • Temperature: 92 °F (33 °C)
- Game attendance: 46,850
- Referee: Mike McCabe
- TV announcers (ESPNU): Clay Matvick (play-by-play), Ryan Leaf (analyst), Taylor Davis (sideline)

Game information

First Quarter

- (9:39) CAL – Trevon Clark 6 yard pass from Chase Garbers, Greg Thomas kick
  California 7–0; 10 plays, 70 yards, 3:47
- (5:50) MISS – Matt Corral 1 yard rush, Luke Logan kick
  Tied 7–7; 11 plays, 75 yards, 3:49

Second Quarter

- (14:52) MISS – Luke Logan 29 yard field goal
  Ole Miss 10–7; 12 plays, 57 yards, 4:02
- (10:43) CAL – Christopher Brown Jr. 13 yard pass from Chase Garbers, Greg Thomas kick
  California 14–10; 10 plays, 75 yards, 4:09
- (3:59) MISS – Luke Logan 33 yard field goal
  California 14–13; 6 plays, 19 yards, 1:25

Third Quarter

- (11:25) CAL – Jordan Duncan 9 yard pass from Chase Garbers, Greg Thomas kick
  California 21–13; 9 plays, 75 yards, 3:35
- (9:03) CAL – Jake Tonges 60 yard pass from Chase Garbers, Greg Thomas kick
  California 28–13; 4 plays, 72 yards, 1:00

Fourth Quarter

- (4:29) MISS – Jerrion Ealy 15 yard rush, Luke Logan kick
  California 28–20; 10 plays, 88 yards, 1:53

Statistics	CAL	MISS
First downs	24	27
Total yards	433	525
Rushes/yards	33/60	38/177
Passing yards	373	348
Passing: Comp–Att–Int	24–36–1	29–48–0
Time of possession	31:00	29:00

Team	Category	Player	Statistics
California	Passing	Chase Garbers	23/35, 357 yards, 4 TD, 1 INT
California	Rushing	Marcel Dancy	12 carries, 47 yards
California	Receiving	Jake Tonges	3 receptions, 88 yards, 1 TD
Ole Miss	Passing	Matt Corral	22/41, 266 yards
Ole Miss	Rushing	Matt Corral	16 carries, 56 yards, 1 TD
Ole Miss	Receiving	Elijah Moore	11 receptions, 102 yards

=== At No. 2 Alabama ===
Uniform Combination
Helmet	Jersey	Pants

Ole Miss Rebels (2–2) at No. 2 Alabama Crimson Tide (4–0)

Quarter	1	2	3	4	Total
Rebels	10	0	7	14	31
No. 2 Crimson Tide	7	31	14	7	59

at Bryant–Denny Stadium • Tuscaloosa, AL

- Date: Saturday, September 28, 2019
- Game time: 2:30 p.m. CDT
- Game weather: Sunny • Temperature: 91 °F (33 °C)
- Game attendance: 99,590
- Referee: Mike McCabe
- TV announcers (CBS): Brad Nessler (play-by-play), Gary Danielson (analyst), Jamie Erdahl (sideline)

Game information

First Quarter

- (13:50) ALA – DeVonta Smith 74 yard pass from Tua Tagovailoa, Joseph Bulovas kick
  Alabama 7–0; 4 plays, 90 yards, 1:10
- (10:20) MISS – John Rhys Plumlee 1 yard rush, Luke Logan kick
  Tied 7–7; 7 plays, 30 yards, 2:25
- (2:36) MISS – Luke Logan 33 yard field goal
  Ole Miss 10–7; 13 plays, 65 yards, 4:39

Second Quarter

- (13:52) ALA – Tua Tagovailoa 7 yard rush, Joseph Bulovas kick
  Alabama 14–10; 9 plays, 66 yards, 3:44
- (9:51) ALA – Joseph Bulovas 36 yard field goal
  Alabama 17–10; 6 plays, 65 yards, 2:18
- (6:01) ALA – DeVonta Smith 25 yard pass from Tua Tagovailoa, Joseph Bulovas kick
  Alabama 24–10; 6 plays, 54 yards, 2:18
- (2:45) ALA – DeVonta Smith 23 yard pass from Tua Tagovailoa, Joseph Bulovas kick
  Alabama 31–10; 7 plays, 45 yards, 2:09
- (1:23) ALA – DeVonta Smith 33 yard pass from Tua Tagovailoa, Joseph Bulovas kick
  Alabama 38–10; 1 play, 28 yards, 0:17

Third Quarter

- (10:49) ALA – DeVonta Smith 27 yard pass from Tua Tagovailoa, Joseph Bulovas kick
  Alabama 45–10; 3 plays, 80 yards, 1:37
- (8:29) MISS – Jerrion Ealy 9 yard pass from John Rhys Plumlee, Luke Logan kick
  Alabama 45–17; 7 plays, 75 yards, 2:20
- (5:29) ALA – Ale Kaho blocked punt recovered in end zone, Joseph Bulovas kick
  Alabama 52–17

Fourth Quarter

- (13:23) MISS – Jonathan Mingo 26 yard pass from John Rhys Plumlee, Luke Logan kick
  Alabama 52–24; 9 plays, 83 yards, 3:00
- (7:57) ALA – Miller Forristall 19 yard pass from Tua Tagovailoa, Joseph Bulovas kick
  Alabama 59–24; 11 plays, 75 yards, 5:26
- (0:05) MISS – Jadon Jackson 28 yard pass from Grant Tisdale, Luke Logan kick
  Alabama 59–31; 6 plays, 70 yards, 2:12

Statistics	MISS	ALA
First downs	25	28
Total yards	476	573
Rushes/yards	58/279	30/155
Passing yards	197	418
Passing: Comp–Att–Int	12–30–1	26–37–0
Time of possession	30:23	29:37

Team	Category	Player	Statistics
Ole Miss	Passing	John Rhys Plumlee	10/28, 141 yards, 2 TD, 1 INT
Ole Miss	Rushing	John Rhys Plumlee	25 carries, 109 yards, 1 TD
Ole Miss	Receiving	Jonathan Mingo	3 receptions, 74 yards, 1 TD
Alabama	Passing	Tua Tagovailoa	26/36, 418 yards, 6 TD
Alabama	Rushing	Najee Harris	9 carries, 71 yards
Alabama	Receiving	DeVonta Smith	11 receptions, 274 yards, 5 TD

=== Vanderbilt ===
Uniform Combination
Helmet	Jersey	Pants

Vanderbilt Commodores (1–3) at Ole Miss Rebels (2–3)

Quarter	1	2	3	4	Total
Commodores	0	6	0	0	6
Rebels	10	0	14	7	31

at Vaught–Hemingway Stadium • Oxford, MS

- Date: Saturday, October 5, 2019
- Game time: 6:30 p.m. CDT
- Game weather: Sunny • Temperature: 86 °F (30 °C)
- Game attendance: 47,601
- Referee: John McDaid
- TV announcers (SEC Network): Tom Hart (play-by-play), Jordan Rogers (analyst), Cole Cubelic (sideline)

Game information

First Quarter

- (12:32) MISS – Luke Logan 41 field goal
  Ole Miss 3–0; 6 plays, 51 yards, 2:28
- (9:15) MISS – John Rhys Plumlee 33 yard rush, Luke Logan kick
  Ole Miss 10–0; 3 plays, 44 yards, 1:03

Second Quarter

- (11:04) VAN – Riley Guay 22 yard field goal
  Ole Miss 10–3; 7 plays, 66 yards, 3:52
- (0:00) VAN – Riley Guay 43 yard field goal
  Ole Miss 10–6; 5 plays, 37 yards, 0:52

Third Quarter

- (12:17) MISS – Jerrion Ealy 78 yard rush, Luke Logan kick
  Ole Miss 17–6; 2 plays, 81 yards, 0:35
- (9:03) MISS – Snoop Conner 84 yard rush, Luke Logan kick
  Ole Miss 24–6; 3 plays, 92 yards, 1:07

Fourth Quarter

- (4:29) MISS – Scottie Phillips 24 yard rush, Luke Logan kick
  Ole Miss 31–6; 8 plays, 69 yards, 4:56

Statistics	VAN	MISS
First downs	17	15
Total yards	264	512
Rushes/yards	27/62	44/413
Passing yards	202	99
Passing: Comp–Att–Int	25–46–0	10–18–0
Time of possession	33:02	26:58

Team	Category	Player	Statistics
Vanderbilt	Passing	Riley Neal	18/30, 140 yards
Vanderbilt	Rushing	Ke'Shawn Vaughn	18 carries, 69 yards
Vanderbilt	Receiving	Kalija Lipscomb	7 receptions, 69 yards
Ole Miss	Passing	John Rhys Plumlee	10/18, 99 yards
Ole Miss	Rushing	John Rhys Plumlee	22 carries, 165 yards, 1 TD
Ole Miss	Receiving	Elijah Moore	4 receptions, 40 yards

=== At Missouri ===
Uniform Combination
Helmet	Jersey	Pants

Ole Miss Rebels (3–3) at Missouri Tigers (4–1)

Quarter	1	2	3	4	Total
Rebels	7	0	7	13	27
Tigers	3	9	23	3	38

at Faurot Field • Columbia, MO

- Date: Saturday, October 12, 2019
- Game time: 6:00 p.m. CDT
- Game weather: Clear • Temperature: 57 °F (14 °C)
- Game attendance: 62,621
- Referee: Lee Hedrick
- TV announcers (ESPN2): Jason Benetti (play-by-play), Rod Gilmore (analyst), Quint Kessenich (sideline)

Game information

First Quarter

- (11:51) MISS – Scottie Phillips 21 yard pass from John Rhys Plumlee, Luke Logan kick
  Ole Miss 7–0; 6 plays, 29 yards, 2:03
- (8:00) MIZ – Tucker McCann 31 yard field goal
  Ole Miss 7–3; 10 plays, 62 yards, 3:51

Second Quarter

- (13:23) MIZ – Tyler Badie 17 yard pass from Kelly Bryant, PAT failed
  Missouri 9–7; 7 plays, 65 yards, 2:26
- (4:38) MIZ – Tucker McCann 48 yard field goal
  Missouri 12–7; 15 plays, 60 yards, 5:39

Third Quarter

- (13:16) MIZ – Larry Rountree III 41 yard rush, PAT failed
  Missouri 18–7; 5 plays, 65 yards, 1:44
- (9:30) MIZ – Tucker McCann 39 yard field goal
  Missouri 21–7; 7 plays, 78 yards, 2:47
- (5:07) MIZ – Dawson Downing 54 yard rush, Tucker McCann kick
  Missouri 28–7; 7 plays, 77 yards, 3:29
- (2:51) MISS – Elijah Moore 28 yard pass from John Rhys Plumlee, Luke Logan kick
  Missouri 28–14; 7 plays, 75 yards, 2:16
- (1:02) MIZ – Larry Rountree III 1 yard rush, Tucker McCann kick
  Missouri 35–14; 5 plays, 75 yards, 1:49

Fourth Quarter

- (13:19) MISS – John Rhys Plumlee 9 yard rush, Luke Logan kick
  Missouri 35–21; 7 plays, 75 yards, 2:43
- (8:09) MIZ – Tucker McCann 38 yard field goal
  Missouri 38–21; 7 plays, 40 yards, 3:13
- (5:51) MISS – John Rhys Plumlee 40 yard rush, PAT failed
  Missouri 38–27; 6 plays, 75 yards, 2:18

Statistics	MISS	MIZ
First downs	25	30
Total yards	440	562
Rushes/yards	45/204	43/233
Passing yards	236	329
Passing: Comp–Att–Int	18–33–0	23–35–1
Time of possession	26:29	33:31

Team	Category	Player	Statistics
Ole Miss	Passing	Matt Corral	10/16, 133 yards
Ole Miss	Rushing	John Rhys Plumlee	23 carries, 143 yards, 2 TD
Ole Miss	Receiving	Elijah Moore	8 receptions, 102 yards, 1 TD
Missouri	Passing	Kelly Bryant	23/35, 329 yards, 1 TD, 1 INT
Missouri	Rushing	Larry Rountree III	21 carries, 126 yards, 2 TD
Missouri	Receiving	Johnathon Johnson	8 receptions, 110 yards

=== Texas A&M ===
Uniform Combination
Helmet	Jersey	Pants

Texas A&M Aggies (3–3) at Ole Miss Rebels (3–4)

Quarter	1	2	3	4	Total
Aggies	3	7	7	7	24
Rebels	7	0	7	3	17

at Vaught–Hemingway Stadium • Oxford, MS

- Date: Saturday, October 19, 2019
- Game time: 6:30 p.m. CDT
- Game weather: Clear • Temperature: 65 °F (18 °C)
- Game attendance: 50,257
- Referee: Marc Curles
- TV announcers (SEC Network): Tom Hart (play-by-play), Jordan Rodgers (analyst), Cole Cubelic (sideline)

Game information

First Quarter

- (6:04) TA&M – Seth Small 24 yard field goal
  Texas A&M 3–0; 10 plays, 73 yards, 5:45
- (5:22) MISS – Jerrion Ealy 69 yard rush, Luke Logan kick
  Ole Miss 7–3; 2 plays, 75 yards, 0:42

Second Quarter

- (0:38) TA&M – Kendrick Rogers 18 yard pass from Kellen Mond, Seth Small kick
  Texas A&M 10–7; 6 plays, 67 yards, 1:17

Third Quarter

- (13:30) MISS – Snoop Conner 2 yard rush, Luke Logan kick
  Ole Miss 14–10; 5 plays, 65 yards, 1:30
- (7:37) TA&M – Buddy Johnson 62 yard fumble return, Seth Small kick
  Texas A&M 17–14

Fourth Quarter

- (2:34) TA&M – Isaiah Spiller 22 yard rush, Seth Small kick
  Texas A&M 24–14; 7 plays, 55 yards, 3:57
- (0:26) MISS – Luke Logan 35 yard field goal
  Texas A&M 24–17; 17 plays, 65 yards, 2:34

Statistics	TA&M	MISS
First downs	20	22
Total yards	337	405
Rushes/yards	38/165	44/250
Passing yards	172	155
Passing: Comp–Att–Int	16–28–2	14–31–1
Time of possession	34:07	25:53

Team	Category	Player	Statistics
Texas A&M	Passing	Kellen Mond	16/28, 172 yards, 1 TD, 2 INT
Texas A&M	Rushing	Isaiah Spiller	16 carries, 78 yards, 1 TD
Texas A&M	Receiving	Jalen Wydermyer	4 receptions, 67 yards
Ole Miss	Passing	Matt Corral	10/17, 124 yards, 1 INT
Ole Miss	Rushing	Jerrion Ealy	6 carries, 80 yards, 1 TD
Ole Miss	Receiving	Elijah Moore	5 receptions, 59 yards

=== At Auburn ===
Uniform Combination
Helmet	Jersey	Pants

Ole Miss Rebels (3–5) at No. 11 Auburn Tigers (6–2)

Quarter	1	2	3	4	Total
Rebels	0	7	0	7	14
No. 11 Tigers	0	10	10	0	20

at Jordan–Hare Stadium • Auburn, AL

- Date: Saturday, November 2, 2019
- Game time: 6:00 p.m. CDT
- Game weather: Sunny • Temperature: 55 °F (13 °C)
- Game attendance: 87,457
- Referee: John McDaid
- TV announcers (ESPN): Sean McDonough (play-by-play), Todd Blackledge (analyst), Holly Rowe (sideline reporter)

Game information

First Quarter

- No scoring drives.

Second Quarter

- (6:03) AUB – Anders Carlson 20 yard field goal
  Auburn 3–0; 14 plays, 72 yards, 4:59
- (2:34) AUB – D.J. Williams 1 yard rush, Anders Carlson kick
  Auburn 10–0; 3 plays, 80 yards, 1:16
- (0:44) MISS – John Rhys Plumlee 4 yard rush, Luke Logan kick
  Auburn 10–7; 3 plays, 23 yards, 0:22

Third Quarter

- (10:09) AUB – Bo Nix 1 yard rush, Anders Carlson kick
  Auburn 17–7; 13 plays, 54 yards, 4:51
- (4:15) AUB – Anders Carlson 38 yard field goal
  Auburn 20–7; 13 plays, 53 yards, 4:54

Fourth Quarter

- (5:45) MISS – Snoop Conner 1 yard rush, Luke Logan kick
  Auburn 20–14; 15 plays, 91 yards, 5:35

Statistics	MISS	AUB
First downs	16	26
Total yards	266	507
Rushes/yards	42/167	46/167
Passing yards	99	340
Passing: Comp–Att–Int	14–27–1	30–44–0
Time of possession	24:12	35:48

Team	Category	Player	Statistics
Ole Miss	Passing	John Rhys Plumlee	11/21, 86 yards, 1 INT
Ole Miss	Rushing	John Rhys Plumlee	17 carries, 92 yards, 1 TD
Ole Miss	Receiving	Snoop Conner	2 receptions, 33 yards
Auburn	Passing	Bo Nix	30/44, 340 yards
Auburn	Rushing	D.J. Williams	24 carries, 93 yards, 1 TD
Auburn	Receiving	Anthony Schwartz	9 receptions, 89 yards

=== New Mexico State ===
Uniform Combination
Helmet	Jersey	Pants

New Mexico State Aggies (0–8) at Ole Miss Rebels (3–6)

Quarter	1	2	3	4	Total
Aggies	0	3	0	0	3
Rebels	10	14	7	10	41

at Vaught–Hemingway Stadium • Oxford, MS

- Date: Saturday, November 9, 2019
- Game time: 3:00 p.m. CST
- Game weather: Sunny • Temperature: 56 °F (13 °C)
- Game attendance: 45,973
- Referee: Hubert Owens
- TV announcers (SEC Network): Dave Neal (play-by-play), DJ Shockley (analyst), Dawn Davenport (sideline)

Game information

First Quarter

- (12:36) MISS – Luke Logan 36 yard field goal
  Ole Miss 3–0; 10 plays, 46 yards, 2:24
- (5:39) MISS – Snoop Conner 30 yard rush, Luke Logan kick
  Ole Miss 10–0; 9 plays, 77 yards, 3:19

Second Quarter

- (11:57) MISS – Jerrion Ealy 5 yard rush, Luke Logan kick
  Ole Miss 17–0; 2 plays, 80 yards, 0:49
- (5:46) NMSU – Dylan Brown 34 yard field goal
  Ole Miss 17–3; 16 plays, 65 yards, 6:04
- (0:40) MISS – John Rhys Plumlee 2 yard rush, Luke Logan kick
  Ole Miss 24–3; 10 plays, 65 yards, 5:06

Third Quarter

- (5:29) MISS – John Rhys Plumlee 18 yard rush, Luke Logan kick
  Ole Miss 31–3; 5 plays, 63 yards, 1:36

Fourth Quarter

- (13:38) MISS – Snoop Conner 1 yard rush, Isaac Way kick
  Ole Miss 38–3; 8 plays, 98 yards, 4:14
- (5:38) MISS – Luke Logan 28 yard field goal
  Ole Miss 41–3; 14 plays, 52 yards, 7:02

Statistics	NMSU	MISS
First downs	12	32
Total yards	193	606
Rushes/yards	24/66	61/447
Passing yards	127	159
Passing: Comp–Att–Int	25–35–0	13–19–0
Time of possession	25:23	34:37

Team	Category	Player	Statistics
New Mexico; State	Passing	Josh Adkins	25/35, 127 yards
New Mexico; State	Rushing	Jason Huntley	7 carries, 45 yards
New Mexico; State	Receiving	Tony Nicholson	6 receptions, 37 yards
Ole Miss	Passing	John Rhys Plumlee	11/17, 124 yards
Ole Miss	Rushing	John Rhys Plumlee	12 carries, 177 yards, 2 TD
Ole Miss	Receiving	Elijah Moore	3 receptions, 37 yards

=== No. 1 LSU ===
Uniform Combination
Helmet	Jersey	Pants

No. 1 LSU Tigers (9–0) at Ole Miss Rebels (4–6)

Quarter	1	2	3	4	Total
No. 1 Tigers	14	17	13	14	58
Rebels	0	7	16	14	37

at Vaught–Hemingway Stadium • Oxford, MS

- Date: Saturday, November 16, 2019
- Game time: 6:00 p.m. CDT
- Game weather: Clear, chilly • Temperature: 46 °F (8 °C)
- Game attendance: 53,797
- Referee: James Carter
- TV announcers (ESPN): Sean McDonough (play-by-play), Todd Blackledge (analyst), Holly Rowe (sideline)

Game information

First Quarter

- (12:56) LSU – Ja'Marr Chase 34 yard pass from Joe Burrow, Cade York kick
  LSU 7–0; 7 plays, 75 yards, 2:04
- (1:22) LSU – Tyrion Davis-Price 4 yard rush, Cade York kick
  LSU 14–0; 9 plays, 80 yards, 4:02

Second Quarter

- (14:09) LSU – Ja'Marr Chase 51 yard pass from Joe Burrow, Cade York kick
  LSU 21–0; 2 plays, 73 yards, 0:42
- (8:27) LSU – Justin Jefferson 12 yard pass from Joe Burrow, Cade York kick
  LSU 28–0; 6 plays, 80 yards, 2:31
- (5:40) MISS – John Rhys Plumlee 5 yard rush, Luke Logan kick
  LSU 28–7; 6 plays, 75 yards, 2:47
- (0:05) LSU – Cade York 33 yard field goal
  LSU 31–7; 13 plays, 63 yards, 5:35

Third Quarter

- (14:29) MISS – John Rhys Plumlee 46 yard rush, Two-Point Conversion
  LSU 31–15; 2 plays, 75 yards, 0:31
- (8:19) LSU – Cade York 27 yard field goal
  LSU 34–15; 17 plays, 66 yards, 6:10
- (7:46) MISS – John Rhys Plumlee 60 yard rush, Two-Point Conversion
  LSU 34–23; 2 plays, 75 yards, 0:33
- (6:50) LSU – Justin Jefferson 7 yard pass from Joe Burrow, Cade York kick
  LSU 41–23; 4 plays, 75 yards, 0:56
- (3:25) LSU – Cade York 52 yard field goal
  LSU 44–23; 4 plays, −10 yards, 1:38

Fourth Quarter

- (13:26) MISS – John Rhys Plumlee 35 yard rush, Luke Logan kick
  LSU 44–30; 1 play, 35 yards, 0:10
- (5:11) LSU – Ja'Marr Chase 61 yard pass from Joe Burrow, Cade York kick
  LSU 51–30; 3 plays, 65 yards, 0:24
- (3:19) MISS – Elijah Moore 55 yard pass from Matt Corral, Luke Logan kick
  LSU 51–37; 6 plays, 75 yards, 1:52
- (3:08) LSU – Clyde Edwards-Helaire 49 yard rush, Cade York kick
  LSU 58–37; 1 play, 49 yards, 0:11

Statistics	LSU	MISS
First downs	35	26
Total yards	714	614
Rushes/yards	39/225	44/402
Passing yards	489	212
Passing: Comp–Att–Int	32–42–2	15–27–1
Time of possession	32:51	27:09

Team	Category	Player	Statistics
LSU	Passing	Joe Burrow	32/42, 489 yards, 5 TD, 2 INT
LSU	Rushing	Clyde Edwards-Helaire	23 carries, 172 yards, 1 TD
LSU	Receiving	Ja'Marr Chase	8 receptions, 227 yards, 3 TD
Ole Miss	Passing	John Rhys Plumlee	9/16, 123 yards, 1 INT
Ole Miss	Rushing	John Rhys Plumlee	21 carries, 212 yards, 4 TD
Ole Miss	Receiving	Elijah Moore	9 receptions, 143 yards, 1 TD

=== At Mississippi State ===
Uniform Combination
Helmet	Jersey	Pants

Ole Miss Rebels (4–7) at Mississippi State Bulldogs (5–6)

Quarter	1	2	3	4	Total
Rebels	0	14	0	6	20
Bulldogs	7	7	7	0	21

at Davis Wade Stadium • Starkville, MS

- Date: Thursday, November 28, 2019
- Game time: 6:30 p.m. CDT
- Game weather: Cloudy • Temperature: 50 °F (10 °C)
- Game attendance: 57,529
- Referee: Hubert Owens
- TV announcers (ESPN): Adam Amin (play-by-play), Matt Hasselbeck (analyst), Pat McAfee (analyst), Molly McGrath (sideline)

Game information

First Quarter

- (6:42) MSST – Nick Gibson 27 yard rush, Jace Christmann kick
  Mississippi State 7–0; 4 plays, 72 yards, 1:44

Second Quarter

- (11:22) MSST – Garrett Shrader 1 yard rush, Jace Christmann kick
  Mississippi State 14–0; 13 plays, 74 yards, 7:41
- (6:15) MISS – John Rhys Plumlee 2 yard rush, Luke Logan kick
  Mississippi State 14–7; 10 plays, 81 yards, 5:07
- (0:34) MISS – Jerrion Ealy 5 yard rush, Luke Logan kick
  Tied 14–14; 9 plays, 49 yards, 3:00

Third Quarter

- (3:24) MSST – Garrett Shrader 5 yard rush, Jace Christmann kick
  Mississippi State 21–14; 7 plays, 40 yards, 3:30

Fourth Quarter

- (0:04) MISS – Elijah Moore 2 yard pass from Matt Corral, kick failed
  Mississippi State 21–20; 12 plays, 82 yards, 2:02

Statistics	MISS	MSST
First downs	23	15
Total yards	381	318
Rushes/yards	47/136	44/210
Passing yards	245	108
Passing: Comp–Att–Int	15–26–1	10–14–0
Time of possession	28:31	31:29

Team	Category	Player	Statistics
Ole Miss	Passing	Matt Corral	6/12, 124 yards, 1 TD, 1 INT
Ole Miss	Rushing	Jerrion Ealy	15 carries, 82 yards, 1 TD
Ole Miss	Receiving	Braylon Sanders	2 receptions, 88 yards
Mississippi; State	Passing	Garrett Shrader	10/14, 108 yards
Mississippi; State	Rushing	Kylin Hill	27 carries, 132 yards
Mississippi; State	Receiving	Deddrick Thomas	4 receptions, 49 yards

The Rebels were trailing 21–14 late in the 4th quarter before quarterback Matt Corral capped a 82-yard, 2:02 drive with a 2-yard touchdown pass to wide receiver Elijah Moore with just 4 seconds left in the game to make the deficit 21–20. Following the touchdown, Moore would drop down to his knees, crawl to the back of the end zone, and lift his leg, pretending to urinate like a dog; Ole Miss would receive a 15-yard unsportsmanlike conduct penalty for Moore's celebration on the ensuing point-after-attempt (PAT). Ole Miss kicker Luke Logan would miss the PAT and the Rebels failed to recover the onside kick, sealing the one-point victory for the Bulldogs.

== Cumulative Season Statistics ==
=== Cumulative Team Statistics ===
Category	Ole Miss	Opponents
First downs - Avg. per game	271 - 22.58	267 - 22.25
Points - Avg. per game	319 - 26.58	318 - 26.5
Total plays/yards - Avg. per game	891/5343 (6 yards/play) - 74.25/445.25	859/5001 (5.82 yards/play) - 71.58/416.75
Passing yards - Avg. per game	2328 - 194	3339 - 278.25
Rushes/yards (net) - Avg. per game	559/3015 - 46.58/251.25 (5.39 yards/carry)	425/1662 - 35.42/138.5 (3.91 yards/carry)
Passing (Att-Comp-Int)	332-186-6 (56.02% completion)	434-288-10 (66.36% completion)
Sacks - Avg. per game	33 - 2.75	21 - 1.75
Penalties–yards - Avg. per game	59–585 - 4.92–48.75	66–561 - 5.5–46.75
3rd down conversions	67–182 (36.81%)	67–173 (39.88%)
4th down conversions	17–32 (53.13%)	12–20 (60%)
Time of possession - Avg. per game	5:38:58 - 28:15	6:21:02 - 32:45

=== Cumulative Player Statistics ===
Category	Player	Statistics - Avg. per game
Leading Passer	Matt Corral	105/178 (58.99% completion), 1362 yards, 6 TD, 3 INT - 8.75/14.83, 113.5 yards, 0.5 TD, 0.25 INT
Leading Rusher	John Rhys Plumlee	154 carries, 1023 yards, 12 TD - 12.83 carries, 85.25 yards (6.64 yards/carry), 1 TD
Leading Receiver	Elijah Moore	67 receptions, 850 yards, 6 TD - 5.58 receptions, 70.83 yards, 0.5 TD

== Roster and coaching staff ==
2019 Ole Miss Rebels football team roster
Players
Coaches
Offense

Pos.	#	Name	Class
WR	1	Jonathan Mingo	Fr
QB	2	Matt Corral	Fr
WR	3	Demarcus Gregory	Fr
RB	4	Tylan Knight	So
WR	5	Dannis Jackson	Fr
WR	6	Miles Battle	Fr
TE	7	Jason Pellerin	Sr
WR	8	Elijah Moore	So
RB	9	Jerrion Ealy	Fr
QB	10	John Rhys Plumlee	Fr
WR	11	Dontario Drummond	Jr
QB	12	Kinkead Dent	Fr
QB	13	Grant Restmeyer	Jr
WR	13	Braylon Sanders	Jr
QB	14	Grant Tisdale	Fr
TE	15	Octavious Cooley	Sr
QB	15	Sellers Shy	Fr
WR	16	Jordan Jernigan	Fr
WR	17	Jadon Jackson	Fr
TE	19	Alex Faniel	So
RB	21	Keshun Wells	Sr
RB	22	Scottie Phillips	Sr
WR	23	Nevin Wells	Fr
RB	24	Snoop Conner	Fr
RB	26	Isaiah Woullard	So
TE	28	D'Vaughn Pennamon	Jr
RB	29	Campbell Klein	Fr
RB	32	Jerry Johnson	Sr
TE	33	Jonathan Hess	So
OL	50	Jalen Cunningham	Fr
OL	52	Michael Howard	Sr
OL	53	KC Swaim	Sr
OL	54	Caleb Warren	Fr
OL	55	Ben Brown	So
OL	56	Reece McIntyre	Fr
OL	59	Samuel Plash	So
C	61	Eli Johnson	Jr
OL	64	Nick Broeker	Fr
OL	65	Peyton Cox	So
OL	67	Alex Givens	Sr
OL	68	Chandler Tuitt	Jr
OL	70	Carter Colquitt	Fr
OL	71	Bryce Mathews	Jr
OL	72	Royce Newman	Jr
OL	74	Darius Thomas	Fr
OL	75	Bryce Ramsey	Fr
OL	76	Nic Cantu	Fr
OL	77	Hamilton Hall	Fr
OL	78	Jeremy James	Fr
WR	80	Josh Ricketts	Jr
TE	81	Casey Kelly	Fr
WR	82	Jared Farlow	Jr
TE	84	Nick Haynes	Jr
WR	85	Jack White	Fr
WR	86	Drake Beck	So
TE	87	Sam Murphey	Fr
WR	89	Jacob Carter	So

Defense

Pos.	#	Name	Class
ILB	1	Lakia Henry	Jr
DB	2	Montrell Custis	Sr
DB	3	Vernon Dasher	Sr
OLB	4	Brandon Mack	Fr
DB	5	Jon Haynes	Jr
DB	6	Kam White	So
DE	7	LeDarrius Cox	Fr
DB	8	C.J. Miller	So
DB	9	Jalen Jordan	Fr
ILB	10	Jacquez Jones	So
ILB	12	Adam Norsworthy	Fr
OLB	13	Sam Williams	Jr
DB	15	Myles Hartsfield	Sr
OLB	16	Luke Knox	Fr
ILB	17	Willie Hibbler	Sr
DB	19	Jamar Richardson	Jr
DB	20	Keidron Smith	So
DB	21	A. J. Finley	Fr
DE	22	Tariqious Tisdale	Jr
DB	23	Jakorey Hawkins	Fr
DB	24	Deantre Prince	Fr
LB	25	Tavario Standifer	Fr
DB	26	Jalen Julius	Sr
DB	28	Jay Stanley	Fr
DB	29	Armani Linton	Sr
ILB	30	Zikerrion Baker	So
DB	31	Jaylon Jones	Jr
DB	32	Jerry Johnson	Sr
ILB	35	Donta Evans	Jr
ILB	36	Ashanti Cistrunk	Fr
DE	38	Austrian Robinson	Sr
DB	39	Kweisi Fountain	Sr
DT	40	Josiah Coatney	Sr
OLB	41	Brenden Williams	Sr
ILB	42	Truett Bourne	Fr
ILB	45	Amani Johnson	So
ILB	46	Mohamed Sanogo	Jr
DB	47	Ty Rocconi	So
ILB	48	Andrew Griffith	Fr
ILB	51	Eric Jeffries	Fr
NT	54	Patrick Lucas Jr.	Fr
NT	55	KD Hill	Fr
DE	88	Ty Reyes	Jr
DE	89	Ryder Anderson	Jr
DT	91	Hal Northern	Jr
DT	93	Sincere David	So
DE	94	Quentin Bivens	Fr
DT	95	Benito Jones	Sr
OLB	97	Qaadir Sheppard	Sr
OLB	98	Lawson Stockett	Fr
OLB	99	Charles Wiley	Jr

Special teams

Pos.	#	Name	Class
LS	73	John Raines	Fr
LS	88	Jack Propst	Jr
K	92	Luke Logan	Jr
K	93	Cale Nation	Fr
P	94	Walker Thompson	Fr
K	95	Isaac Way	Jr
P	96	Mac Brown	Jr
P	97	Spencer Cole	Jr

Head coach

- Matt Luke – 3rd year

Coordinators/assistant coaches

- Rich Rodriguez (Offensive Coordinator) – 1st year
- Mike MacIntyre (Defensive Coordinator) – 1st year
- Jack Bicknell Jr. (Offensive Line) – 3rd year
- Charles Clark (Cornerbacks) – 2nd year
- Jeff Koonz (Inside Linebackers) – 1st year
- Calvin Magee (Tight Ends) – 1st year
- Derrick Nix (Running Backs) – 12th year
- Tyrone Nix (Linebackers) – 1st year
- Jacob Peeler (Wide Receivers) – 3rd year
- Freddie Roach (Defensive Line) – 3rd year

Legend

- (C) Team captain
- (S) Suspended
- (I) Ineligible
- Injured
- Redshirt

Roster
Last update: June 21, 2019
