= Stargell =

Stargell can refer to:

- Willie Stargell (1940-2001), American baseball player
- Tony Stargell (born 1966), American football player
