= Freddie Roach (American football) =

American football player and coach (born 1983)

Alabama Crimson Tide
- Title: Assistant head coach & defensive line coach

Personal information
- Born: June 3, 1983 (age 43); Florence, Alabama, U.S.
- Listed height: 6 ft 2 in (1.88 m)
- Listed weight: 251 lb (114 kg)

Career information
- High school: Brooks (Killen, Alabama)
- College: Alabama (2002–2005)
- NFL draft: 2006: undrafted

Career history

Playing
- New England Patriots (2006)*
- * Offseason or practice squad member only

Coaching
- Alabama (2008–2010) Assistant strength and conditioning; East Mississippi Community College (2011) Defensive line coach; Murray State (2012) Defensive line coach; South Alabama (2013–2014) Defensive ends & outside linebackers coach; Alabama (2015–2016) Director of player development; Ole Miss (2017–2019) Defensive line coach; Alabama (2020–present) Assistant head coach & defensive line coach

Awards and highlights
- As player: 2× Second-team All-SEC (2004, 2005); As assistant coach: 3× national champion (2009, 2015, 2020)

Freddie Roach (born June 3, 1983) is an American college football coach and former linebacker. He is the assistant head coach and defensive line coach for the University of Alabama, positions he has held since 2020.

== Playing career ==
Roach was linebacker for Alabama from 2002 to 2005. After his playing days in Tuscaloosa, Roach signed as an undrafted free agent with the New England Patriots in 2006. However, he was cut at the end of the preseason.

== Coaching career ==
=== Alabama (first stint) ===
Roach's began his coaching career at University of Alabama in 2008 under Nick Saban as the Crimson Tide's assistant strength and conditioning coach. He stayed in that position until 2010 winning a national championship in 2009.

=== Murray State ===
For the 2012 season, worked as the defensive line coach for Murray State.

=== South Alabama ===
For the 2013 and 2014 seasons Roach worked under Joey Jones as the defensive ends and outside linebackers coach at South Alabama.

=== Alabama (second stint) ===
Roach once again returned to Alabama in 2015 this time working as the team's director of player development. He stayed in that position through 2016, winning another national championship.

=== Ole Miss ===
Roach was recruited to be the defensive line coach for Ole Miss by head coach Hugh Freeze in 2017. He was there for Matt Luke's entire tenure which ended after the 2019 season.

=== Alabama (third stint) ===
After rumors of him going to the NFL to join Joe Judge's inaugural staff with the Giants, in 2020 Roach returned to Alabama's coaching staff for a third time, this time as the team's defensive line coach replacing Brian Baker. There he won another national championship in 2020. On February 14, 2024, Roach was promoted to associate head coach by new head coach Kalen DeBoer.

== Personal life ==
Roach and his wife, Ashley, have four children.
