= Callaway High School =

Callaway High School may refer to:

- Callaway High School (Georgia), Hogansville, Georgia
- Callaway High School (Mississippi), Jackson, Mississippi
- Callaway High School (Nebraska), Callaway, Nebraska
