= Bruce Thornton =

Bruce Thornton may refer to:

- Bruce Thornton (basketball) (born 2003), American basketball player
- Bruce Thornton (classicist) (born 1953), American classicist
- Bruce Thornton (defensive lineman) (born 1958), American football player
- Bruce Thornton (cornerback) (born 1980), American football cornerback
