= Troup County School District =

Public school district

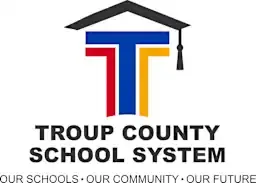

Address
- 100 North Davis Rd LaGrange, Troup, Georgia, 30241-1620; United States
- Coordinates: 33.05125°N 84.984753°W

District information
- Grades: Pre-kindergarten – 12
- Superintendent: Rachel B. Hazel
- Accreditations: Southern Association of Colleges and Schools; Georgia Accrediting Commission

Students and staff
- Enrollment: 12,278 (2024–25)
- Faculty: 868.40 (FTE)
- Staff: 958.00 (FTE)
- Student–teacher ratio: 14.13

Other information
- Telephone: (706) 812-7900
- Fax: (706) 812-7904
- Website: troup.org

The Troup County School District is a public school district in Troup County, Georgia, United States, based in county seat LaGrange. It serves the communities of Hogansville, LaGrange, and West Point.

== Schools ==
The Troup County School District has eleven elementary schools, three middle schools, and five high schools.

=== Elementary schools ===
- Berta Weathersbee Elementary School - Eagles
- Callaway Elementary School - Cavaliers
- Clearview Elementary School - Wolves
- Ethel W. Kight Elementary School - Knights
- Franklin Forest Elementary School - Falcons
- Hillcrest Elementary School - Panthers
- Hogansville Elementary School - Green Wave
- Hollis Hand Elementary School - Hawks
- Long Cane Elementary School - Leopards
- Rosemont Elementary School - Tiger Cubs
- West Point Elementary School - Bulldogs

=== Middle schools ===
- Callaway Middle School - Cavaliers
- Gardner Newman Middle School - Mustangs
- Long Cane Middle School - Cougars

=== High schools ===
- Callaway High School
- Hope Academy
- LaGrange High School
- ThINC Academy
- Troup County Career Center
- Troup County High School
