= Charles B. Eichelberger =

American Army general

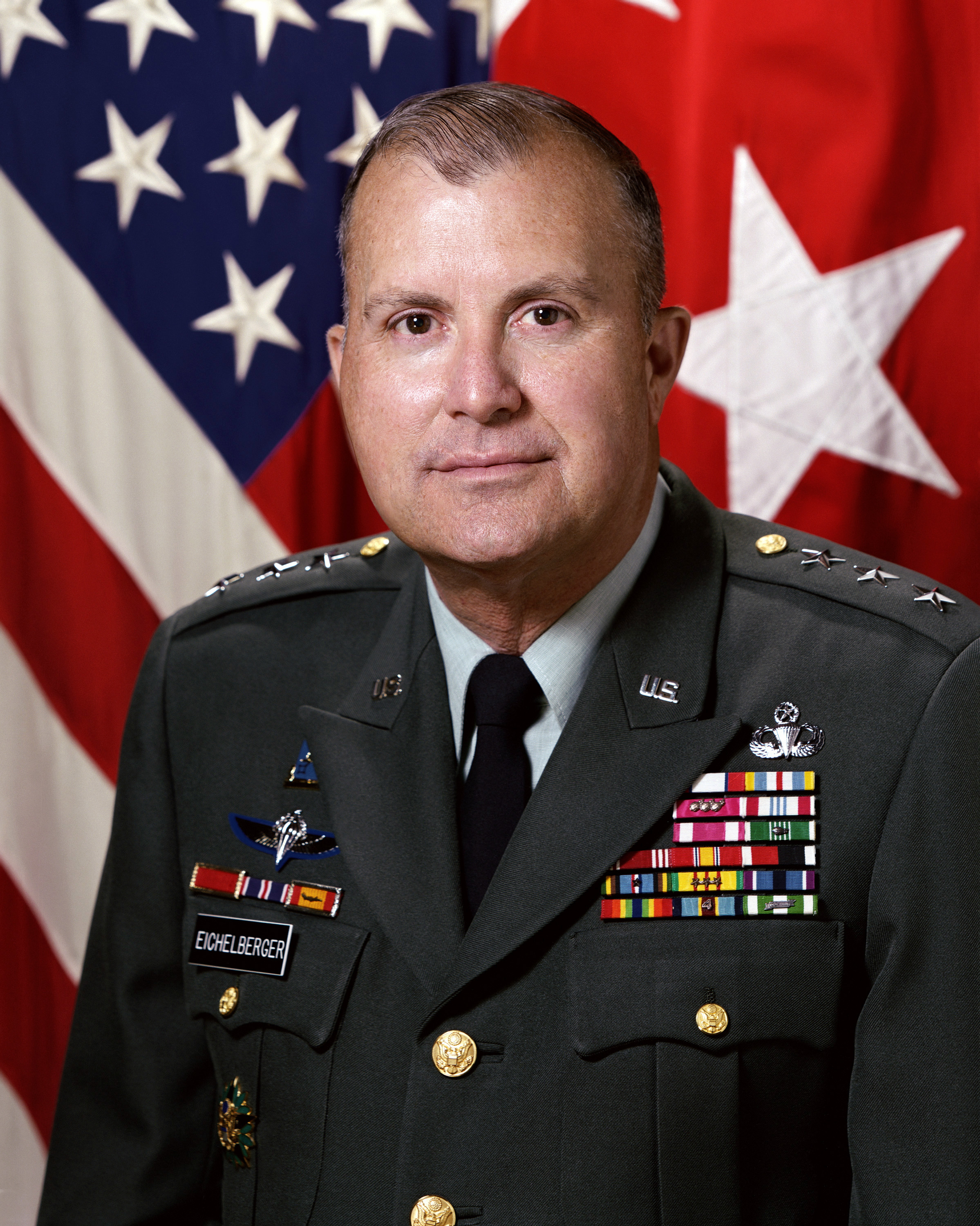
- Eichelberger in 1991
- Born: November 19, 1934; LaGrange, Georgia, U.S.
- Died: December 27, 2021 (aged 87); Sachse, Texas, U.S.
- Burial place: Arlington National Cemetery
- Military career
- Allegiance: United States
- Branch: United States Army
- Service years: 1955–1991
- Rank: Lieutenant General
- Awards: Army Distinguished Service Medal; Defense Superior Service Medal; Legion of Merit; Order of Military Merit

Charles Bell Eichelberger (November 19, 1934 – December 27, 2021) was an officer in the United States Army. From November 22, 1989, to September 30, 1991, Eichelberger, then a lieutenant general, served as the deputy chief of staff for intelligence, Headquarters, Department of the Army. He is credited with providing high quality military intelligence support for Operations Desert Shield and Desert Storm.

Born and raised in LaGrange, Georgia, Eichelberger is a 1952 graduate of LaGrange High School, where he was known as Charlie. He subsequently attended Georgia Military College and enlisted in the Army after graduating in 1955. Eichelberger was commissioned after completing Infantry Officers' Candidate School in January 1957. He later completed a B.S. degree in law enforcement and corrections at the University of Nebraska and earned an M.A. degree in education administration from Pepperdine University. Eichelberger graduated from the Army Command and General Staff College in 1969 and the Army War College in June 1976.

Eichelberger was commissioned a second lieutenant from Infantry Officer Candidate School in 1957. He started his career in Military Intelligence (MI) as a platoon commander and later served as an executive officer, assistant S3, S2/S3 intelligence/operations officer, and at every level of command available to an MI officer. Additionally, he served at the joint level several times, including duty as the J2 of US Central Command (CENTCOM). He served as deputy chief of staff for intelligence, US Army Europe (USAEUR), and assistant deputy chief of staff for intelligence, Headquarters, Department of the Army (HQDA). He culminated his active duty career as the deputy chief of staff for Intelligence, HQDA. During 1989 through 1991, he helped MI face three monumental crises—Operation JUST CAUSE, the conflict in Panama; Operations DESERT SHIELD/DESERT STORM; and the resulting draw down of US forces. In preparing for Operation JUST CAUSE, LTG Eichelberger faced the challenge of establishing national intelligence coordination. He was able to portray graphically a very intricate enemy situation from a small database. As the Army's senior intelligence officer during Operation DESERT SHIELD/DESERT STORM, LTG Eichelberger exercised brilliant initiative by providing the best intelligence field commanders had ever experienced in support of ground operations. He helped introduce prototype intelligence systems into the Kuwaiti theater of operations; he coordinated the training of Kuwaiti students in the US in order to employ them in direct support of Intelligence, Military Police, and Psychological Operations units; he provided the best qualified personnel from around the globe to in country intelligence staffs; and he kept the Army staff fully informed in near real time. LTG Eichelberger, as part of the MI Board and National Foreign Intelligence Board, was instrumental in analyzing the collapse of Communism, its impact on world society and economics, and its effect on the reduction of US Army military strength. As a result of his actions, many of the proposals to reduce the size of MI capabilities to below adequate operating levels were reversed or revised. If the proposals had been allowed to go unchallenged, they would have decimated MI capabilities for future operations. LTG Eichelberger retired from the Army in 1991. His awards and decorations include the Distinguished Service Medal, the Defense Superior Service Medal, the Legion of Merit (2 Oak Leaf Clusters), the Defense Meritorious Service Medal, the Army Commendation Medal (1 Oak Leaf Cluster), the Good Conduct Medal, the Master Parachutist Badge, and the Army Staff Identification Badge. LTG Eichelberger was inducted into the MI Hall of Fame in 1992.

Eichelberger has received the Distinguished Service Medal, the Defense Superior Service Medal and three awards of the Legion of Merit. He is a member of the Military Intelligence Hall of Fame.

Eichelberger died on December 27, 2021.

== Awards and decorations ==
Eichelberger's military awards included:

Defense Distinguished Service Medal
Defense Superior Service Medal
Legion of Merit
Order of Military Merit (Commander, 1991; Brazil)
