= Wilbur Strozier =

American football player (born 1964)

No. 87, 81
- Position: Tight end

Personal information
- Born: November 12, 1964 (age 61); LaGrange, Georgia, U.S.
- Listed height: 6 ft 4 in (1.93 m)
- Listed weight: 255 lb (116 kg)

Career information
- High school: LaGrange
- College: Georgia
- NFL draft: 1987: 7th round, 194th overall pick

Career history
- Denver Broncos (1987)*; Seattle Seahawks (1987); San Diego Chargers (1988); Cleveland Browns (1989)
- * Offseason or practice squad member only

Awards and highlights
- First-team All-American (1986); First-team All-SEC (1986)
- Stats at Pro Football Reference

Wilbur Lamar Strozier (born November 12, 1964) is an American former professional football player who was a tight end in the National Football League (NFL).

Born and raised in La Grange, Georgia, Strozier played scholastically at LaGrange High School. He played collegiately for the Georgia Bulldogs, where, as a senior, he was honored by Football News as a first-team All-American.

Pre-draft measurables
Height	Weight	Arm length	Hand span	Bench press
6 ft 3 3/4 in (1.92 m)	273 lb (124 kg)	32 1/2 in (0.83 m)	9 3/4 in (0.25 m)	29 reps
All values from NFL Combine

Strozier was selected by the Denver Broncos in the seventh round of the 1987 NFL draft. He was waived by the Broncos towards the end of preseason, but signed by the Seattle Seahawks a week later. He saw action in all 12 non-strike games for the Seahawks.

Strozier spent the 1988 offseason with the Seahawks, but again was waived late in preseason. He signed with the San Diego Chargers prior to week 7, and was with them for 6 games, but was released after week 12.

Strozier made one final effort in the NFL, with the Cleveland Browns in 1989. He was placed on the injured reserve list near the end of preseason, and was released when healthy.
