= Snoop Conner =

American football player (born 2000)

Profile
- Position: Running back

Personal information
- Born: August 1, 2000 (age 26); Hattiesburg, Mississippi, U.S.
- Listed height: 5 ft 10 in (1.78 m)
- Listed weight: 219 lb (99 kg)

Career information
- High school: Hattiesburg
- College: Ole Miss (2019–2021)
- NFL draft: 2022: 5th round, 154th overall pick

Career history
- Jacksonville Jaguars (2022–2023); Dallas Cowboys (2024)*; Birmingham Stallions (2026)
- * Offseason or practice squad member only

Career NFL statistics as of 2024
- Rushing yards: 42
- Rushing average: 3.5
- Rushing touchdowns: 1
- Stats at Pro Football Reference

Jarod Devon "Snoop" Conner (born August 1, 2000) is an American professional football running back. He played college football at Ole Miss, and was selected by the Jacksonville Jaguars in the fifth round of the 2022 NFL draft.

== College career ==
Conner played three seasons at Ole Miss. As a freshman, he rushed for a season-high 109 yards on 13 carries with two touchdowns against New Mexico State. As a sophomore, he recorded a career-high 128 yards on 21 carries and two touchdowns against Alabama in a 63–48 loss. He added 43 rushing yards and a touchdown in a 26–20 victory over Indiana in the 2021 Outback Bowl. In the season opener against Louisville, he rushed for 60 yards and two touchdowns in the Aflac Kickoff Game. Later in the season against Arkansas, he ran for 110 yards on 10 carries with a career-high three touchdowns.

Over three seasons, Conner rushed for 1,580 yards and 26 touchdowns across 35 games, making two starts. He elected to forgo his senior season and entered the 2022 NFL draft.

=== Statistics ===
Year	Team	Games		Rushing				Receiving			
Year	Team	GP	GS	Att	Yds	Avg	TD	Rec	Yds	Avg	TD
2019	Ole Miss	12	0	81	512	6.3	5	6	60	10.0	0
2020	Ole Miss	10	1	93	421	4.5	8	12	83	6.9	0
2021	Ole Miss	13	1	130	647	5.0	13	14	82	5.9	0
Career		35	2	304	1,580	5.2	26	32	225	7.0	0

== Professional career ==
Pre-draft measurables
Height	Weight	Arm length	Hand span	Wingspan	40-yard dash	10-yard split	20-yard split	Vertical jump	Broad jump	Bench press
5 ft 10 1/8 in (1.78 m)	222 lb (101 kg)	30 1/4 in (0.77 m)	9 1/4 in (0.23 m)	6 ft 1 5/8 in (1.87 m)	4.59 s	1.58 s	2.66 s	31.0 in (0.79 m)	9 ft 10 in (3.00 m)	25 reps
All values from NFL Combine/Pro Day

=== Jacksonville Jaguars ===
Conner was selected by the Jacksonville Jaguars in the fifth round, 154th overall, of the 2022 NFL draft. He scored his first NFL touchdown on a three-yard rush in Week 17 against the Houston Texans. Conner appeared in eight games as a rookie, where he recorded 12 carries for 42 rushing yards and one rushing touchdown.

On August 29, 2023, Conner was waived by the Jaguars as part of final roster cuts and re-signed to the practice squad the following day. He was not signed to a reserve/future contract and thus became a free agent after the season when his practice squad contract expired.

=== Dallas Cowboys ===
On January 18, 2024, the Dallas Cowboys signed Conner to a reserve/future contract. He was waived on August 27 as part of final roster cuts.
