= John Johnson (linebacker) =

American football player (born 1968)

No. 55, 50
- Position: Linebacker

Personal information
- Born: May 8, 1968 (age 58); LaGrange, Georgia, U.S.
- Listed height: 6 ft 3 in (1.91 m)
- Listed weight: 240 lb (109 kg)

Career information
- High school: LaGrange (Georgia)
- College: Clemson (1987–1990)
- NFL draft: 1991: 3rd round, 53rd overall pick

Career history
- San Francisco 49ers (1991–1993); Cincinnati Bengals (1994); Kansas City Chiefs (1995)*; New Orleans Saints (1995)
- * Offseason or practice squad member only

Awards and highlights
- 2× Second-team All-ACC (1989, 1990)

Career NFL statistics
- Tackles: 74
- Forced fumbles: 3
- Interceptions: 2
- Stats at Pro Football Reference

John Vernard Johnson (born May 8, 1968) is an American former professional football player who was a linebacker for five seasons in the National Football League (NFL) with the San Francisco 49ers, Cincinnati Bengals and New Orleans Saints. He was selected by the 49ers in the second round of the 1991 NFL draft after playing college football at Clemson University.

== Early life and college ==
John Vernard Johnson was born on May 8, 1968, in LaGrange, Georgia and attended LaGrange High School. He was a four-year letterman for the Clemson Tigers from 1987 to 1990. He was named second-team All-ACC in 1989 and 1990.

== Professional career ==
Pre-draft measurables
Height	Weight	Arm length	Hand span	40-yard dash	10-yard split	20-yard split	20-yard shuttle	Vertical jump	Broad jump	Bench press
6 ft 3 1/4 in (1.91 m)	225 lb (102 kg)	32 in (0.81 m)	9 in (0.23 m)	4.59 s	1.62 s	2.72 s	4.31 s	30.5 in (0.77 m)	9 ft 7 in (2.92 m)	16 reps

Johnson was selected by the San Francisco 49ers in the second round, with the 53rd overall pick, of the 1991 NFL draft. He officially signed with the team on July 10. He played in nine games for the 49ers during his rookie year in 1991 and recorded five tackles before being placed on injured reserve on November 9, 1991. He became a free agent after the 1991 season and re-signed with the 49ers. Johnson played in all 16 games, starting two, in 1992, totalling 19 tackles, one sack, and one interception that was returned for a 56-yard touchdown. He also appeared in two playoff games that season. He appeared in 15 games, starting 12, during the 1993 season, accumulating 46 tackles, two sacks, one interception, three forced fumbles, and one fumble recovery. He also started two playoff games that year. Johnson was waived by the 49ers on June 10, 1994.

Johnson was claimed off waivers by the Cincinnati Bengals on June 13, 1994. He played in five games for the Bengals that year, recording three solo tackles and one assisted tackle, before being released on October 4, 1994.

Johnson signed with the Kansas City Chiefs in 1995 but was released on July 19, 1995.

Johnson was signed by the New Orleans Saints on July 24, 1995. He was released on August 28, re-signed on September 6, and released again on October 21, 1995. Overall, he appeared in one game for the Saints that season but did not record any statistics.
