= Tank Bigsby =

American football player (born 2002)

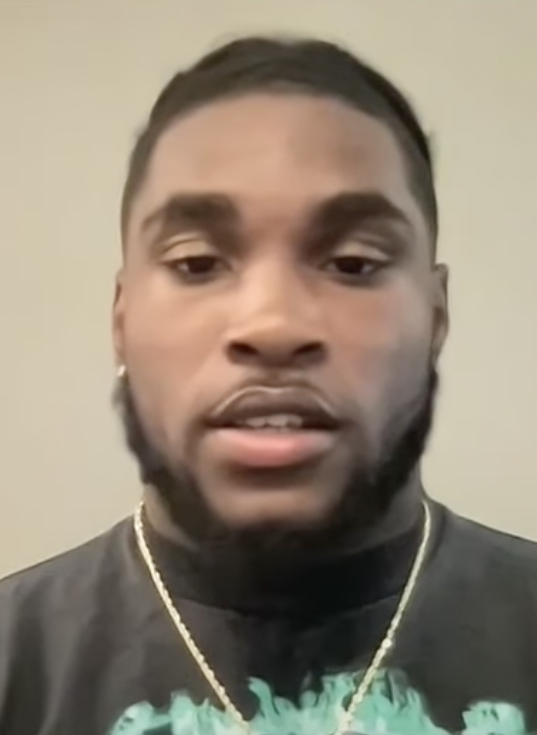
- Bigsby in 2023

No. 8 – Philadelphia Eagles
- Positions: Running back, kickoff returner
- Roster status: Injured reserve

Personal information
- Born: August 30, 2002 (age 24); LaGrange, Georgia, U.S.
- Listed height: 5 ft 11 in (1.80 m)
- Listed weight: 215 lb (98 kg)

Career information
- High school: Callaway (Hogansville, Georgia)
- College: Auburn (2020–2022)
- NFL draft: 2023: 3rd round, 88th overall pick

Career history
- Jacksonville Jaguars (2023–2025); Philadelphia Eagles (2025–present)

Awards and highlights
- SEC Co-Freshman of the Year (2020); Second-team All-SEC (2020)

Career NFL statistics as of Week 4, 2026
- Rushing yards: 1,345
- Rushing average: 4.4
- Rushing touchdowns: 12
- Receptions: 14
- Receiving yards: 102
- Return yards: 551
- Stats at Pro Football Reference

Cartavious "Tank" Bigsby (born August 30, 2002) is an American professional football running back and kickoff returner for the Philadelphia Eagles of the National Football League (NFL). He played college football for the Auburn Tigers and was selected by the Jacksonville Jaguars in the third round of the 2023 NFL draft. He was traded to the Eagles in 2025.

== Early life ==
Bigsby attended Callaway High School in Hogansville, Georgia. While there, he played high school football. As a senior, he rushed for 1,636 yards with 27 touchdowns and as a junior had 2,221 yards and 22 touchdowns. He committed to Auburn University to play college football. A four star prospect, he was ranked as the 7th overall recruit in the state of Georgia by 247 Sports.

== College career ==
Bigsby took over as Auburn's starting running back his freshman year in 2020. He had his first 100-yard game against Georgia, rushing for 146 yards on 20 carries. Bigsby finished the season averaging 6.0 yards per carry for a total of 834 yards and was voted the SEC Newcomer/Freshman of the Year. In 2021, Bigsby improved upon his strong freshman season and would rush for 1,099 yards and ten touchdowns. In the 2022 season, he had 179 carries for 970 rushing yards and ten rushing touchdowns.

== Professional career ==
Pre-draft measurables
Height	Weight	Arm length	Hand span	Wingspan	40-yard dash	10-yard split	20-yard split	Vertical jump	Broad jump	Bench press
5 ft 11 5/8 in (1.82 m)	210 lb (95 kg)	32 in (0.81 m)	9 1/2 in (0.24 m)	6 ft 4 5/8 in (1.95 m)	4.45 s	1.58 s	2.50 s	32.5 in (0.83 m)	9 ft 11 in (3.02 m)	21 reps
All values from NFL Combine/Pro Day

=== Jacksonville Jaguars ===
Bigsby was drafted by the Jacksonville Jaguars in the third round, 88th overall, of the 2023 NFL draft. In Week 1, he scored his first NFL touchdown in his NFL debut on a one-yard carry in the fourth quarter of a 31–21 victory over the Indianapolis Colts. He appeared in all 17 games as a rookie. He finished with 50 carries for 132 yards and two touchdowns in the 2023 season.

In Week 5 of the 2024 season against the Colts, Bigsby had 13 carries for 101 rushing yards and two rushing touchdowns in the 37–34 win. In a Week 7 win over the Patriots, he had 26 carries for 118 rushing yards and two rushing touchdowns.

=== Philadelphia Eagles ===
On September 9, 2025, Bigsby was traded to the Philadelphia Eagles in exchange for 2026 fifth- and sixth-round draft picks. On December 20, 2025, Bigsby ran for 37 yards and his first touchdown with the Eagles during their division clinching 29-18 win against the Washington Commanders.
