= Tony Stargell =

American football player (born 1966)

No. 45
- Position: Cornerback

Personal information
- Born: August 7, 1966 (age 60); LaGrange, Georgia, U.S.
- Listed height: 5 ft 11 in (1.80 m)
- Listed weight: 190 lb (86 kg)

Career information
- High school: LaGrange
- College: Tennessee State
- NFL draft: 1990: 3rd round, 56th overall pick

Career history
- New York Jets (1990–1991); Indianapolis Colts (1992–1993); Tampa Bay Buccaneers (1994–1995); Kansas City Chiefs (1996); Chicago Bears (1997)

Career NFL statistics
- Tackles: 291
- Interceptions: 6
- Forced fumbles: 7
- Stats at Pro Football Reference

Tony L. Stargell (born August 7, 1966) is an American former professional football player who was a cornerback for eight seasons in the National Football League (NFL) from 1990 to 1997. Stargell attended LaGrange High School and graduated with the class of 1986. He played college football for the Tennessee State Tigers and was selected 56th overall by the New York Jets in the third round of the 1990 NFL draft.
