= Matt Luke (American football) =

American football player and coach (born 1976)

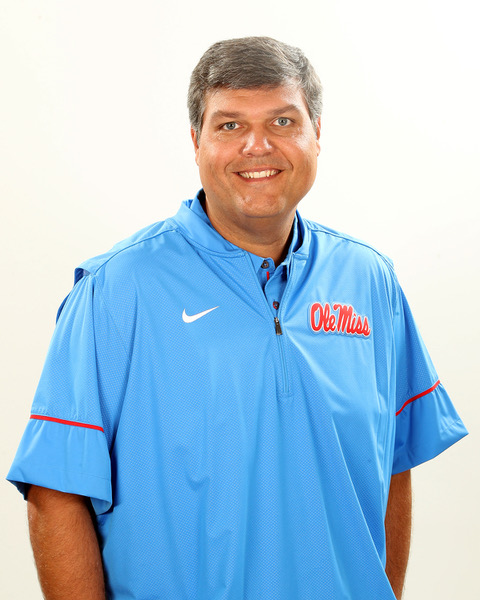

Current position
- Title: Co-offensive coordinator Assistant head coach Offensive line coach
- Team: Clemson
- Conference: ACC

Biographical details
- Born: October 29, 1976 (age 49); Gulfport, Mississippi, U.S.

Playing career
- 1995–1998: Ole Miss
- Position: Center

Coaching career (HC unless noted)
- 1999: Ole Miss (GA)
- 2000–2001: Murray State (OL)
- 2002–2005: Ole Miss (OL/TE)
- 2006–2007: Tennessee (OL/TE)
- 2008–2011: Duke (co-OC/OL)
- 2012–2016: Ole Miss (co-OC/OL)
- 2017–2019: Ole Miss
- 2020–2021: Georgia (AHC/OL)
- 2024–present: Clemson (co-OC/AHC/OL)

Head coaching record
- Overall: 15–21

Accomplishments and honors

Championships
- 1 National (2021)

Matthew Barham Luke (born October 29, 1976) is an American football coach and former player who is currently the offensive line coach at Clemson University.

Luke previously served as the assistant head coach and offensive line coach at the University of Georgia. Luke was also the head coach at the University of Mississippi, amassing a 15–21 record from 2017 to 2019.

== Playing career ==
Luke was born in Gulfport, Mississippi. He was a standout at Gulfport High School, but he was a walk-on at Ole Miss, where scholarships were limited because of NCAA sanctions. He played center there from 1995 to 1998, graduating in 2000. His father, Tommy Luke, played defensive back at Ole Miss in the 1960s while his older brother, Tom Luke, played quarterback there from 1989 to 1991. As a senior, he played in the 1998 Independence Bowl against Texas Tech.

== Coaching career ==
=== Assistant coach ===
Luke exhausted his eligibility after the 1999 season but joined the coaching staff as a graduate assistant. After graduating from Ole Miss in 2000 with a Bachelor of Business Administration, he took a job with Murray State University as an offensive line coach. Following the 2001 season, he returned to Ole Miss to coach offensive line and tight ends under head coach David Cutcliffe. Ole Miss fired Cutcliffe after the 2004 season, but new head coach Ed Orgeron retained Luke as part of his staff.

Luke departed Ole Miss in 2006 to be reunited with Cutcliffe at the University of Tennessee, where Cutcliffe was the assistant head coach and offensive coordinator under head coach Phillip Fulmer. Luke coached the offensive line and tight ends at Tennessee for two seasons (2006–2007).

In early 2008, Duke University hired Cutcliffe as its new head coach, and Cutcliffe brought several Tennessee assistants with him, including Luke. At Duke, Luke was co-offensive coordinator with responsibility for the running game, while also coaching the offensive line. Luke departed Duke at the end of the 2011 season to rejoin the Ole Miss coaching staff under new head coach Hugh Freeze. At Ole Miss, he had a similar role: co-offensive coordinator and offensive line coach.

=== Head coach ===
On July 20, 2017, Luke became the interim head coach at Ole Miss after Freeze was forced to resign. After a late season push to finish 6–6, Ole Miss removed the interim tag on November 26, 2017 and named Luke the 37th head football coach in school history. Ole Miss did not play in a bowl game; it had withdrawn from bowl consideration in response to NCAA rules violations committed when Freeze was head coach. The school and NCAA also imposed additional penalties, including a second post-season ban for the 2018 season (which also allowed athletes near the end of their eligibility to transfer without penalty); three years of NCAA probation; reductions in scholarships; and recruiting restrictions.

Ole Miss finished with losing records in the next two seasons, resulting in Luke's firing on December 1, 2019.

=== Georgia ===
On December 10, 2019, Luke joined the Georgia football staff as an offensive line coach and associate head coach. He helped guide the 2021 Georgia Bulldogs football team to the national championship. On February 21, 2022, he stepped down from his position, citing a need to spend more time with his family.

== Head coaching record ==
Year	Team	Overall	Conference	Standing	Bowl/playoffs
Ole Miss Rebels (Southeastern Conference) (2017–2019)
2017	Ole Miss	6–6	3–5	6th (Western)	
2018	Ole Miss	5–7	1–7	6th (Western)	
2019	Ole Miss	4–8	2–6	6th (Western)	
Ole Miss:		15–21	6–18		
Total:		15–21			
