= Braylon Sanders =

American football player (born 1999)

No. 3 – DC Defenders
- Position: Wide receiver
- Roster status: Active

Personal information
- Born: January 21, 1999 (age 27); Hogansville, Georgia, U.S.
- Listed height: 6 ft 0 in (1.83 m)
- Listed weight: 188 lb (85 kg)

Career information
- High school: Callaway (Hogansville)
- College: Ole Miss (2017–2021)
- NFL draft: 2022: undrafted

Career history
- Miami Dolphins (2022–2023); New England Patriots (2024)*; DC Defenders (2025); Washington Commanders (2025)*; Houston Gamblers (2026)*; DC Defenders (2026–present)
- * Offseason or practice squad member only

Awards and highlights
- UFL champion (2025)

Career NFL statistics as of 2024
- Receptions: 2
- Receiving yards: 17
- Stats at Pro Football Reference

Jontavious Braylon Sanders (born January 21, 1999) is an American professional football wide receiver for the DC Defenders of the United Football League (UFL). He played college football for the Ole Miss Rebels. He has also been a member of the Miami Dolphins, New England Patriots, Washington Commanders, and Houston Gamblers.

== Early life ==
Sanders was born on January 21, 1999, in Hogansville, Georgia. He attended and played football at Callaway High School. He committed to play college football at Ole Miss on February 1, 2017.

== Professional career ==
Pre-draft measurables
Height	Weight	Arm length	Hand span	Wingspan	40-yard dash	10-yard split	20-yard split	20-yard shuttle	Three-cone drill	Vertical jump	Broad jump	Bench press
6 ft 0 1/8 in (1.83 m)	194 lb (88 kg)	31 1/2 in (0.80 m)	10 in (0.25 m)	6 ft 2 3/4 in (1.90 m)	4.48 s	1.48 s	2.58 s	4.25 s	6.96 s	34.5 in (0.88 m)	10 ft 1 in (3.07 m)	12 reps
All values from NFL Combine/Pro Day

=== Miami Dolphins ===
Sanders was signed by the Miami Dolphins as an undrafted free agent on April 30, 2022, shortly after the conclusion of the 2022 NFL draft. He was waived by the Dolphins on August 30, and re-signed to the practice squad. In Week 7 against the Detroit Lions, Sanders made his NFL debut, catching two passes for 17 yards but also losing a fumble. He signed a reserve/future contract on January 16, 2023.

On August 29, 2023, Sanders was waived by the Dolphins and re-signed to the practice squad. He signed a reserve/future contract on January 15, 2024.

Sanders was waived/injured by the Dolphins on August 27, 2024, and placed on injured reserve. He was waived on September 4.

=== New England Patriots ===
On October 29, 2024, Sanders was signed to the New England Patriots practice squad.

=== DC Defenders ===
On March 6, 2025, Sanders signed with the DC Defenders of the United Football League (UFL). In seven games played, he caught 13 passes for 332 yards and three touchdowns, including a 76-yard touchdown catch during the team's Week 7 victory over the San Antonio Brahmas. The Defenders went on to win the 2025 UFL championship game.

=== Washington Commanders ===
On August 2, 2025, Sanders signed with the Washington Commanders. He was waived by the Commanders on August 25.

=== Houston Gamblers ===
On January 13, 2026, Sanders was selected by the Houston Gamblers in the 2026 UFL draft.

=== DC Defenders (second stint) ===
On March 13, 2026, Sanders was traded back to the DC Defenders in exchange for Gottlieb Ayedze.
