= Bruce Thornton (cornerback) =

American gridiron football player (born 1980)

No. 25, 26
- Position: Cornerback

Personal information
- Born: January 31, 1980 (age 46); LaGrange, Georgia, U.S.
- Listed height: 5 ft 10 in (1.78 m)
- Listed weight: 195 lb (88 kg)

Career information
- High school: LaGrange
- College: Georgia
- NFL draft: 2004: 4th round, 121st overall pick

Career history
- Dallas Cowboys (2004); San Francisco 49ers (2005); New York Jets (2006)*; Jacksonville Jaguars (2007)*; Montreal Alouettes (2007)*
- * Offseason or practice squad member only

Career NFL statistics
- Total tackles: 41
- Pass deflections: 8
- Interceptions: 2
- Return yards: 43
- Stats at Pro Football Reference

Bruce Thornton Sr. (born January 31, 1980) is an American former professional football player who was a cornerback in the National Football League (NFL) for the Dallas Cowboys and San Francisco 49ers. He played college football for the Georgia Bulldogs.

== Early life ==
Thornton attended LaGrange High School, where he was a three-year starter at running back. As a senior, he earned Super Prep All-America honors after finishing with 1,920 rushing yards, 28 touchdowns, 932 return yards and 12 blocked kicks. In his high school career he totalled 560 carries for 4,541 rushing yards.

He accepted a football scholarship from the University of Georgia. He redshirted his freshman year after breaking his thumb. The following season, he only started one game at tailback, registering 230 yards, 47 carries, 3 touchdowns (2 were against New Mexico State University), while averaging 18.4 yards per kickoff return.

As a sophomore, he was converted into a cornerback by Willie Martinez, Georgia's secondary coach and defensive coordinator. He had 9 starts, while collecting 32 tackles, one tackle for loss and 7 passes defensed.

As a junior, he collected 43 tackles, 4 tackles for loss, 2 interceptions, 6 passes defensed . He returned a blocked punt 12 yards for a touchdown against Northwestern Louisiana State University. He also returned an interception 71 yards (second longest in school history) for a touchdown in the Sugar Bowl against Florida State University.

As a senior, he was named a team captain and was the Bulldogs' best cornerback, starting 13 games and often facing the opponents' best wide receiver. He posted 54 tackles (seventh on the team), 3 tackles for loss, 8 passes defensed and 2 interceptions.

He finished his college career with 129 tackles (8 for loss), 4 interceptions, 21 passes defensed, 41 carries for 230 yards, 3 touchdowns and 22 kickoff returns for 404 yards (18.4-yard average). as a sophomore …

== Professional career ==
Pre-draft measurables
Height	Weight	Arm length	Hand span	40-yard dash	10-yard split	20-yard split	Vertical jump	Broad jump
5 ft 10 3/8 in (1.79 m)	197 lb (89 kg)	29 7/8 in (0.76 m)	8 1/2 in (0.22 m)	4.55 s	1.63 s	2.66 s	37.5 in (0.95 m)	10 ft 2 in (3.10 m)
All values from NFL Combine

=== Dallas Cowboys ===
Thornton was selected by the Dallas Cowboys in the fourth round (121st overall) of the 2004 NFL draft. He only appeared in one game, in which he returned two kickoffs for 43 yards, before tearing his ACL. He was placed on the injured reserve list on October 12. He was waived on September 8, 2005.

=== San Francisco 49ers ===
On September 14, 2005, the San Francisco 49ers signed him to their practice squad. Injuries forced the 49ers to promote him to the active roster on October 2 and eventually named him the starter at left cornerback. In his first start he was matched against All-Pro Marvin Harrison, and was able to limit him to 2 receptions for 17 yards. He also intercepted quarterback Peyton Manning in the end zone, and received honorable-mention NFL defensive player of the week honors for his efforts. He appeared in 12 games with 11 starts, finishing with 32 tackles, 2 interceptions and 8 passes defensed.

On August 1, 2006, he was released after struggles in his play caused him to drop on the depth chart.

=== New York Jets ===
On August 4, 2006, he signed as a free agent with the New York Jets and was waived 8 days later.

=== Jacksonville Jaguars ===
On May 9, 2007, he was signed by the Jacksonville Jaguars to replace the recently waived Ahmad Carroll. He was released on September 1.

=== Montreal Alouettes (CFL) ===
On October 11, 2007, Thornton joined the Montreal Alouettes practice roster. In 2008, he did not make the team after being released on June 14.
