= LaGrange High School (Georgia) =

Public school in LaGrange, Georgia, United States

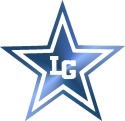

Location
- 516 N Greenwood St; LaGrange, Georgia 30240; United States; 33°02′46″N 85°02′04″W

Information
- Type: Public secondary
- Motto: "Preparing students to excel through Leadership, Honor, and Service"
- Established: 1903
- School district: Troup County School District
- Principal: Jamie Bozeman
- Teaching staff: 77.40 (FTE)
- Grades: 9–12
- Enrollment: 1,301 (2023–2024)
- Student to teacher ratio: 16.81
- Campus: Urban
- Colors: Royal blue and white
- Mascot: Granger
- Website: LaGrange High School

LaGrange High School, located in LaGrange, Georgia, United States, is a public secondary school serving around 1300 students in the Troup County school system. Founded in 1903, the school is notable for producing several collegiate and professional athletes and was the national champion football team in 1991.

The town and high school derive their name from a connection to the French soldier and statesman, Marquis De Lafayette.

== Mascot ==
The school's mascot is the Granger. In France, it is common to use the term "la grange" to indicate a farm, as barns are a common feature. The French term "grange" (with an anglicized pronunciation) came also to be used colloquially as a name for a farm, and later a granger became a term for a farmer, with this use most commonly in the American North and Midwest. The school, however, has never officially used the term "Granger" to indicate or describe the mascot as a farmer.

== Athletics ==
LaGrange High has produced professional athletes such as Mike Cameron, Dernell Stenson, Tony Stargell, Tyrone Poole, and Wesley Woodyard. Sports offered are tennis, football, cross-country, track and field, cheerleading, basketball, golf, gymnastics, soccer, softball, swimming, volleyball, wrestling, and baseball.

The baseball team had one state championship in 2004.

LaGrange High School football

The LaGrange football team has had 65 years of winning seasons since 1919. They have won many championship titles &ndash; 19-time region champions, 11-time state champions, and 1-time winner of the USA Today National Championship in 1991. The independently maintained lagrangefootball.com has nearly six hours of video highlights.

As of the 2011 season the Grangers have a win-loss record of 598–277-26. After the 1991 season, the Grangers received the title of the number one team in the nation as ranked by USA Today. Since 1919 there has yet to be a losing coach to come through this program, except for the current coach Dialleo Burks who has the worst record in school history as a head coach; his current record at the program is 12-29.

=== LaGrange vs. Newnan ===
The rivalry between the Grangers and the Newnan High Cougars goes back to at least 1908. The Grangers lead the rivalry 49-30-4. In 2005 the Grangers were defeated by Newnan High School to end a 29-game win streak which is the longest in school history. Newnan has grasped three meetings in a row up through the 2009 season. In 2004 the Grangers opened up with the old-time rivals for the first time since 1999. The preseason ranked #1 in 3A Grangers defeated the 5A preseason ranked #2 Cougars 35-7, to start off their undefeated state championship season in 2004. "The ‘04 LaGrange team ranked in the Top-25 of five national polls at season’s end and as high as No. 9 in one poll with one of the finest teams in school history."

=== Decade accomplishments 2000-2010 ===
In January 2010 the Atlanta Journal-Constitution bestowed "Best of the Decade" awards to Georgia Prep Football Teams based on results. LaGrange won the following awards:

- Player of the decade: Trae Blackmon (2004)
- Coach of the decade: Steve Pardue (1994-2010)
- Team of the decade: 2004 state championship team
- Overall program of the decade

Individual player awards went to:

- Joe Mansour (2009, K)
- Trae Blackmon (2004, LB)
- Braxton Kelley (2004, DL)
- Sam Olajubutu (2001, LB)

== Notable alumni ==
- Dialleo Burks, former Arena Football League wide receiver and linebacker
- Mike Cameron, former professional baseball player (Chicago White Sox, Cincinnati Reds, Seattle Mariners, New York Mets, San Diego Padres, Milwaukee Brewers, Boston Red Sox, Florida Marlins)
- Marty Carter, professional football player (Tampa Bay Buccaneers, Chicago Bears, Atlanta Falcons, Detroit Lions)
- Charlie Eichelberger, U.S. Army lieutenant general
- John Johnson, NFL player
- Randolph Mahaffey, selected by Los Angeles Lakers in 1967 NBA draft, 1968 All-Star with ABA's Kentucky Colonels
- Jim Reynolds, former professional football player
- Dernell Stenson, former professional baseball player (Cincinnati Reds)
- Wilbur Strozier, former professional football player (Seattle Seahawks, San Diego Chargers)
- Bruce Thornton, former professional football player (Dallas Cowboys, San Francisco 49ers)
- Wesley Woodyard, professional football player (Denver Broncos)
