= Benito Jones =

American football player (born 1997)

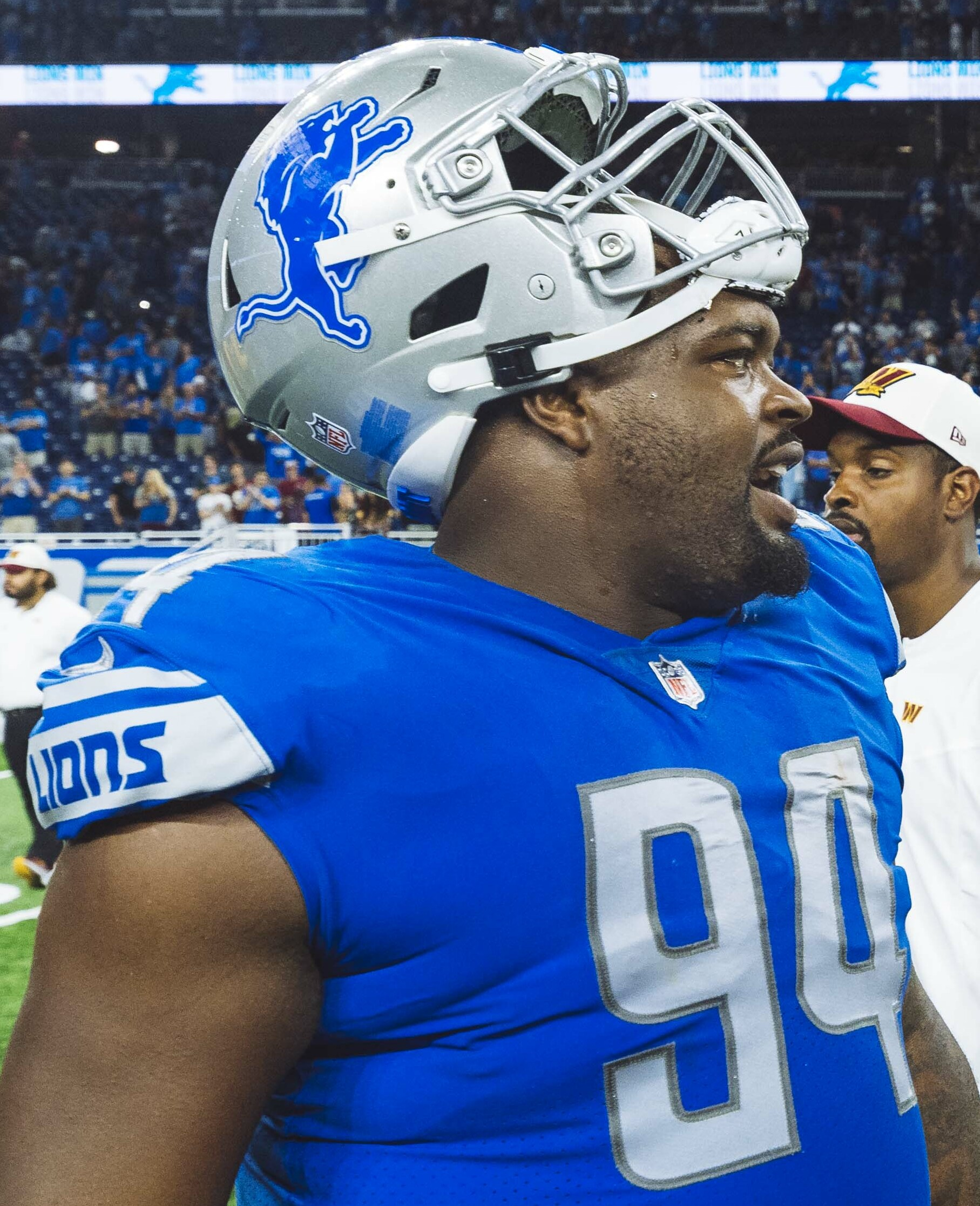
- Jones with the Detroit Lions in 2022

Profile
- Position: Defensive tackle

Personal information
- Born: November 27, 1997 (age 28); Waynesboro, Mississippi, U.S.
- Listed height: 6 ft 1 in (1.85 m)
- Listed weight: 335 lb (152 kg)

Career information
- High school: Wayne County (Waynesboro)
- College: Ole Miss (2016–2019)
- NFL draft: 2020: undrafted

Career history
- Miami Dolphins (2020–2021); Detroit Lions (2022–2023); Miami Dolphins (2024–2025); Las Vegas Raiders (2026)*
- * Offseason or practice squad member only

Career NFL statistics as of 2025
- Total tackles: 83
- Sacks: 3.5
- Pass deflections: 3
- Stats at Pro Football Reference

Benito Jaquez Jones (born November 27, 1997) is an American professional football nose tackle. He played college football for the Ole Miss Rebels, and previously played in the NFL for the Detroit Lions and Miami Dolphins.

== Professional career ==
Pre-draft measurables
Height	Weight	Arm length	Hand span	Wingspan	40-yard dash	10-yard split	20-yard split	20-yard shuttle	Three-cone drill	Vertical jump
6 ft 1 in (1.85 m)	316 lb (143 kg)	32 7/8 in (0.84 m)	9 3/4 in (0.25 m)	6 ft 8 7/8 in (2.05 m)	5.26 s	1.80 s	3.02 s	5.27 s	8.21 s	26.5 in (0.67 m)
All values from NFL Combine

=== Miami Dolphins (first stint) ===
After playing four years at Ole Miss, Jones was signed by the Miami Dolphins as an undrafted free agent on April 25, 2020. He was waived during final roster cuts on September 5, and was signed to the practice squad two days later. He was elevated to the active roster on October 17, October 31, November 13, November 18, and November 24 for the team's Weeks 6, 8, 10, 11, and 12 games against the New York Jets, Los Angeles Rams, Los Angeles Chargers, Denver Broncos, and Jets, and reverted to the practice squad following each game without having to clear waivers. He was signed to the active roster on December 2. Johnson played in six games during his rookie season, logging one tackle.

On August 31, 2021, Jones was waived by the Dolphins and re-signed to the practice squad.

On April 19, 2022, Jones was re-signed by the Dolphins. He was waived by the Dolphins on August 30.

=== Detroit Lions ===
Jones was claimed off waivers by the Detroit Lions on August 31, 2022. He played in all 17 regular season games during the year, starting none of them. Johnson played in 27% of the Lions defensive snaps and recorded 1.5 sacks, 16 total tackles, and 2 pass deflections.

In the 2023 season, Jones again appeared in all 17 regular season games, and this time he started 15 of them. He logged 13 solo tackles (26 total), and one sack. Jones’ snap count jumped quite a bit, getting to play over 250 more snaps over the year prior. He played 52% of the Lions defensive snaps. Jones also got his first playoff action, appearing in three of the Lions postseason games, logging one solo tackle.

=== Miami Dolphins (second stint) ===
On March 18, 2024, Jones signed with the Miami Dolphins. He played in all 17 games, starting 15, recording 24 tackles.

Jones re-signed with the Dolphins on March 20, 2025. He played in 14 games (including eight starts), recording 15 tackles, one sack, and a pass deflection. On December 27, Jones was placed on season-ending injured reserve due to a back injury.

=== Las Vegas Raiders ===
On May 13, 2026, Jones signed with the Las Vegas Raiders. He was released by the Raiders on August 17.

== NFL statistics ==
=== Regular season ===
Year	Team	Games		Tackles						Interceptions						Fumbles			
Year	Team	GP	GS	Cmb	Solo !	Ast	Sck	TFL	QBHits	PD	Int	Yds	Avg	Lng	TD	FF	FR	Yds	TD
2020	MIA	6	0	2	1	1	0.0	1	0	0	0	0	0	-	0	0	0	0	0
2021	*MIA	Did not play - Spent season on Practice Squad																	
2022	DET	17	0	16	8	8	1.5	0	4	2	0	0	0	-	0	0	0	0	0
2023	DET	17	15	26	13	13	1.0	3	6	0	0	0	0	-	0	0	0	0	0
2024	MIA	17	15	24	9	15	0.0	0	3	0	0	0	0	-	0	0	0	0	0
2025	MIA	14	8	15	6	9	1.0	2	1	1	0	0	0	-	0	0	0	0	0
Career		71	38	83	37	46	3.5	10	14	3	0	0	0	-	0	0	0	0	0

=== Postseason ===
Year	Team	Games		Tackles						Interceptions						Fumbles			
Year	Team	GP	GS	Cmb	Solo	Ast	Sck	TFL	QBHits	PD	Int	Yds	Avg	Lng	TD	FF	FR	Yds	TD
2023	DET	3	0	1	1	0	0.0	0	0	0	0	0	0	-	0	0	0	0	0
Career		3	0	1	1	0	0	0	0	2	0	0	0	-	0	0	0	0	0
