= Jaylon Jones (American football, born 1997) =

American football player (born 1997)

No. 36 – Jacksonville Jaguars
- Position: Cornerback
- Roster status: Active

Personal information
- Born: October 14, 1997 (age 29); Allen, Texas, U.S.
- Listed height: 5 ft 11 in (1.80 m)
- Listed weight: 190 lb (86 kg)

Career information
- High school: Allen (TX)
- College: Ole Miss (2016–2021)
- NFL draft: 2022: undrafted

Career history
- Chicago Bears (2022–2024); Arizona Cardinals (2025)*; Chicago Bears (2025–2026)*; Jacksonville Jaguars (2026–present)
- * Offseason or practice squad member only

Career NFL statistics as of 2025
- Total tackles: 101
- Forced fumbles: 2
- Pass deflections: 4
- Stats at Pro Football Reference

Jaylon Terrell Jones (born October 14, 1997) is an American professional football cornerback for the Jacksonville Jaguars of the National Football League (NFL). He played college football for the Ole Miss Rebels.

== Early life ==
Jones was born on October 14, 1997, in Allen, Texas. He attended Allen High School and helped their football team make it to the state championship game three years in a row. He was a first-team all-state selection by USA Today as a senior after making 61 tackles and an interception. He was ranked the ninth-best cornerback nationally by Scout.com and was a four-star prospect.

== College career ==
Jones committed to Ole Miss in July 2015. He played his first season in 2016, and was named a first-team Freshman All-American after playing in every game and ranking second on the team in passes defended. As a sophomore in 2017, Jones started six games and appeared in 12 as a defensive back and return specialist. He was 19th nationally and third in the conference with 775 kick return yards, and returned a kickoff for a 97-yard touchdown against South Alabama. In the 2018 season opener, he made a career-high seven tackles and returned a kickoff 94 yards for a touchdown before suffering a season-ending injury.

As a redshirt-junior in 2019, Jones played in 10 games and started four at cornerback, recording 33 total tackles and five pass breakups. As a redshirt-senior in 2020, he started the first four games of the season before suffering a season-ending upper body injury. He had made 27 total tackles before getting injured. Jones announced he would return for a sixth season in 2021. He graduated following the 2021 season.

== Professional career ==
Pre-draft measurables
Height	Weight	Arm length	Hand span	Wingspan	40-yard dash	10-yard split	20-yard split	20-yard shuttle	Three-cone drill	Vertical jump	Broad jump	Bench press
5 ft 10 3/4 in (1.80 m)	190 lb (86 kg)	31 1/2 in (0.80 m)	9 1/4 in (0.23 m)	6 ft 4 5/8 in (1.95 m)	4.41 s	1.51 s	2.50 s	4.10 s	6.70 s	35.5 in (0.90 m)	9 ft 10 in (3.00 m)	18 reps
All values from Pro Day

=== Chicago Bears ===
After going unselected in the 2022 NFL draft, Jones was signed by the Chicago Bears as an undrafted free agent. He was one of six cornerbacks to make the team's final roster. He made his NFL debut against the San Francisco 49ers in week one, playing on 15 special teams snaps in the 19–10 win. Jones made his first career start in the Bears' 29–22 loss against the Minnesota Vikings in week five, and recorded 13 combined tackles and a forced fumble.

=== Arizona Cardinals ===
On March 21, 2025, Jones signed with the Arizona Cardinals. He was waived on August 26 as part of final roster cuts.

=== Chicago Bears (second stint) ===
On August 27, 2025, Jones was claimed off waivers by the Chicago Bears.

On March 16, 2026, Jones re-signed with the Bears on a one-year contract. He was placed on injured reserve on August 30. Jones was released by the Bears on September 2.

=== Jacksonville Jaguars ===
On October 6, 2026, Jones signed with the Jacksonville Jaguars.
