= Ryder Anderson =

American football player (born 1998)

Profile
- Position: Defensive end

Personal information
- Born: October 15, 1998 (age 28); Katy, Texas, U.S.
- Listed height: 6 ft 6 in (1.98 m)
- Listed weight: 280 lb (127 kg)

Career information
- High school: Katy
- College: Ole Miss (2017–2020); Indiana (2021)
- NFL draft: 2022: undrafted

Career history
- New York Giants (2022–2023); New Orleans Saints (2024)*; Birmingham Stallions (2026)*
- * Offseason or practice squad member only

Career NFL statistics as of 2024
- Total tackles: 8
- Sacks: 2
- Stats at Pro Football Reference

Ryder Patrick Anderson (born October 15, 1998) is an American professional football defensive end. He played college football for the Ole Miss Rebels and Indiana Hoosiers.

== Early life ==
Anderson was born in Katy, Texas. His older brother, Rodney, was an all-state running back. Both Andersons won separate state championships in 2012 and 2015, respectively, at perennial Texas high school football power Katy High School. Ryder began high school as a quarterback but quickly outgrew the position, so his head coach switched him to defensive lineman.

== College career ==
On November 28, 2016, Anderson committed to Ole Miss. At Ole Miss, Anderson had 98 tackles, 15 for a loss, 9.5 sacks, one pass defended, one fumble recovered, and one forced fumble. On January 4, 2021, Anderson entered the college football transfer portal. Four days later, he transferred to Indiana. At Indiana, he had 47 tackles, 7.5 tackles for loss, 2.5 sacks, and 1 forced fumble. Overall in his college career, he had 147 total tackles, 22.5 total tackles for loss, 9.5 total sacks, one defended pass, one recovered fumble, and two total forced fumbles. After the 2021 season, Anderson declared for the 2022 NFL draft.

== Professional career ==
Pre-draft measurables
Height	Weight	Arm length	Hand span	20-yard shuttle	Three-cone drill	Vertical jump	Broad jump
6 ft 6 1/4 in (1.99 m)	276 lb (125 kg)	34 3/8 in (0.87 m)	10 3/8 in (0.26 m)	4.57 s	7.21 s	32.0 in (0.81 m)	9 ft 5 in (2.87 m)
All values from Pro Day

=== New York Giants ===
Anderson went undrafted in the 2022 NFL Draft. He signed with the New York Giants as an undrafted free agent on May 14, 2022. Anderson was waived on August 30, and signed to the practice squad the next day. Anderson was elevated from the practice squad for Week 6 and Week 7 games against the Baltimore Ravens and Jacksonville Jaguars. He was promoted to the active roster on December 16.

On August 29, 2023, Anderson was waived by the Giants and re-signed to the practice squad. Following the end of the 2023 regular season, the Giants signed him to a reserve/future contract on January 8, 2024. Anderson was waived/injured by New York on August 20.

=== New Orleans Saints ===
On November 6, 2024, Anderson was signed to the New Orleans Saints practice squad. He signed a reserve/future contract with the Saints on January 6, 2025. Anderson was waived by New Orleans on April 29, 2025.

=== Birmingham Stallions ===
On January 21, 2026, Anderson signed with the Birmingham Stallions. He was released on March 19.

== Personal life ==
Anderson is the son of Rod and Jobie Anderson. His brothers are Rodney Anderson and Nic Anderson and his uncle is Mark Anderson.
