= Callaway High School (Georgia) =

Public high school in Hogansville, Georgia, United States

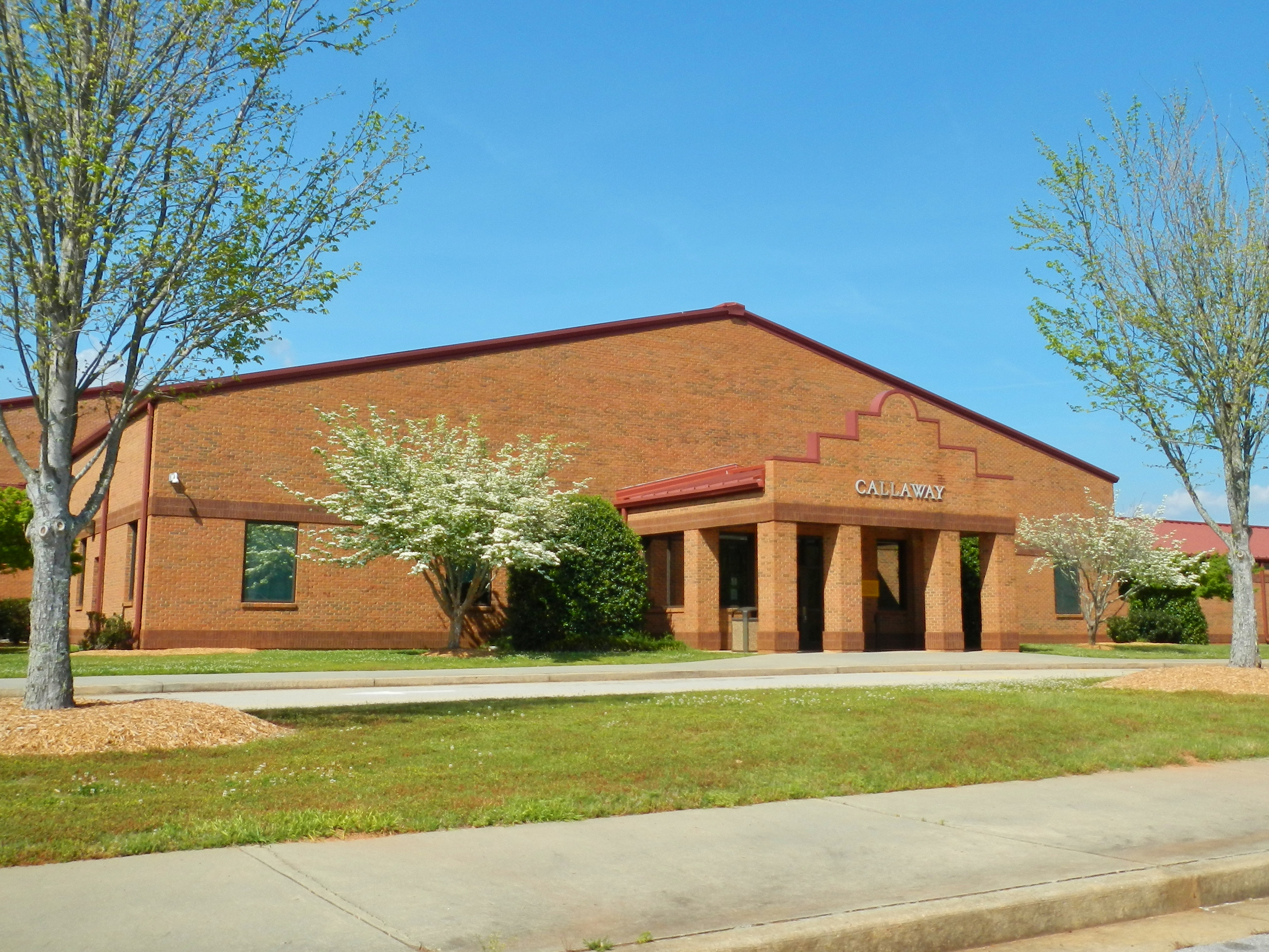

Location
- 221 Whitfield Rd. Hogansville, Georgia; United States; 33.0848°N 84.9806°W

Information
- Type: Public secondary
- Established: 1996
- School district: Troup County School District
- Principal: Jason Graham
- Teaching staff: 55.80 (on an FTE basis)
- Grades: 9–12
- Enrollment: 939 (2023–2024)
- Student to teacher ratio: 16.83
- Colors: Red and black
- Mascot: Cavalier
- Rival: Heard County High School, LaGrange High School
- Website: Callaway High School

Callaway High School is a public high school located in Hogansville, Georgia, United States. It enrolls students in grades 9–12 from LaGrange, Hogansville, and the surrounding area. The principal is Jason Graham. The mascot of Callaway is the Cavalier.

== History and demographics ==
Callaway High School opened in 1996 to replace Hogansville High School. It was named after the Callaway family who lived in the area.

Callaway is the smallest of the three public high schools in Troup County. In 2026, Callaway had 939 students. In 2026, the student body was 52.6% Black, 31.9% White, 9.6% Hispanic, 4.5% multi-racial, and 1.2% Asian. About 55% of Callaway's students were considered economically disadvantaged, and 9% were disabled.

== Academics ==
The school offers Advanced Placement courses in:

- English Language and Composition
- English Literature and Composition
- U.S. Government and Politics
- U.S. History
- Calculus AB
- Environmental Science
- Human Geography
- Statistics

Callaway High School also offers the Cambridge Advanced International Certificate of Education.

== Sports ==
Callaway sports teams include football, flag football, competition cheer, softball, volleyball, basketball, wrestling, baseball, golf, soccer, tennis, eSports, track and field, cross country, and swimming.

Callaway is in Region 2-AAA in Georgia. In 2020, the school's football team won their first State Championship, defeating Fitzgerald High School. The head football coach is Coach Pete Wiggins.

== Notable alumni ==
- Tank Bigsby, NFL running back for the Philadelphia Eagles
