= Ole Miss Rebels football statistical leaders =

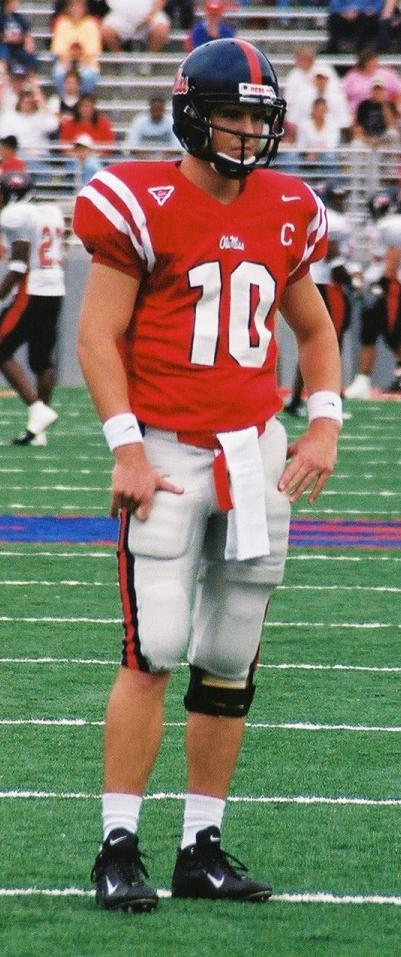
Eli Manning holds the Ole Miss career record for passing touchdowns.

The Ole Miss Rebels football statistical leaders are individual statistical leaders of the Ole Miss Rebels football program in various categories, including passing, rushing, receiving, total offense, defensive stats, and kicking. Within those areas, the lists identify single-game, single-season, and career leaders. The Rebels represent the University of Mississippi in the NCAA Division I FBS Southeastern Conference.

Although Ole Miss began competing in intercollegiate football in 1893, the school's official record book considers the "modern era" to have begun in 1933. Records from before this year are often incomplete and inconsistent, and they are generally not included in these lists.

These lists are dominated by more recent players for several reasons:

- Since 1933, seasons have increased from 10 games to 11 and then 12 games in length.
- The NCAA didn't allow freshmen to play varsity football until 1972 (with the exception of the World War II years), allowing players to have four-year careers.
- Bowl games only began counting toward single-season and career statistics in 2002. The Rebels have played in 16 bowl games since then, allowing players to accumulate stats for at least one additional game in those seasons. Ole Miss reached the College Football Playoff semifinals in the 2025 season, giving players in that season the opportunity to play in two postseason games.
- From 2018 through 2025, FBS players were allowed to participate in as many as four games in a redshirt season; previously, playing in even one game "burned" the redshirt. In 2024 and 2025, postseason games did not count against the four-game limit. These changes to redshirt rules gave players during this time several extra games to accumulate statistics.
- A more recent change that will have a major effect on future career leaderboards was introduced in 2026 with full implementation starting with the 2027 freshman class. Going forward, redshirting will be prohibited, but players will have five years of full athletic eligibility, provided that they are no older than 19 when they first enroll in a postsecondary institution. Players who had remaining eligibility under previous rules at the end of the 2025 season will benefit from the new rule.
- Due to COVID-19 disruptions, the NCAA did not count the 2020 season against the eligibility of any football player, giving all players active in that season five years of eligibility instead of the normal four.
- The Rebels have accumulated over 5,000 offensive yards in each of the last eight seasons.

These lists are updated through Week 12 of the 2026 season. Players currently active for Ole Miss are in bold.

== Passing ==
=== Passing yards ===
Career
Rank	Player	Yards	Years
1	Jaxson Dart	10,617	2022 2023 2024
2	Eli Manning	10,119	2000 2001 2002 2003
3	Bo Wallace	9,534	2012 2013 2014
4	Matt Corral	8,287	2018 2019 2020 2021
5	Chad Kelly	6,800	2015 2016
6	**Trinidad Chambliss**	6,790	2025 2026
7	Romaro Miller	6,311	1997 1998 1999 2000
8	Kent Austin	6,184	1981 1982 1983 1984 1985
9	Jordan Ta'amu	5,600	2017 2018
10	John Fourcade	5,412	1978 1979 1980 1981

Single season
Rank	Player	Yards	Year
1	Jaxson Dart	4,279	2024
2	Chad Kelly	4,042	2015
3	**Trinidad Chambliss**	3,937	2025
4	Jordan Ta'amu	3,918	2018
5	Eli Manning	3,600	2003
6	Eli Manning	3,401	2002
7	Jaxson Dart	3,364	2023
8	Matt Corral	3,349	2021
9	Bo Wallace	3,346	2013
10	Matt Corral	3,337	2020

Single game
Rank	Player	Yards	Year	Opponent
1	Jaxson Dart	515	2024	Arkansas
2	Matt Corral	513	2020	South Carolina
3	Shea Patterson	489	2017	UT Martin
4	Chad Kelly	465	2016	Auburn
5	Jordan Ta'amu	457	2018	Vanderbilt
6	Jordan Ta'amu	448	2018	Kent State
6	Jaxson Dart	448	2022	Vanderbilt
8	Jordan Ta'amu	442	2018	Southern Illinois
9	Archie Manning	436	1969	Alabama
10	Shea Patterson	429	2017	South Alabama

=== Passing touchdowns ===
Career
Rank	Player	TDs	Years
1	Eli Manning	84	2000 2001 2002 2003
2	Jaxson Dart	72	2022 2023 2024
3	Bo Wallace	62	2012 2013 2014
4	Matt Corral	57	2018 2019 2020 2021
5	Chad Kelly	50	2015 2016
6	Jevan Snead	46	2008 2009
	**Trinidad Chambliss**	46	2025 2026
8	Romaro Miller	45	1997 1998 1999 2000
9	Archie Manning	31	1968 1969 1970
9	Mark Young	31	1985 1986 1987 1988
9	Kent Austin	31	1981 1982 1983 1984 1985

Single season
Rank	Player	TDs	Year
1	Eli Manning	31	2001
1	Chad Kelly	31	2015
3	Eli Manning	29	2003
3	Matt Corral	2 9	2020
3	Jaxson Dart	29	2024
6	Jevan Snead	26	2008
7	**Trinidad Chambliss**	24	2026
8	Jaxson Dart	23	2023
8	Bo Wallace	22	2012
8	Bo Wallace	22	2014
8	Trinidad Chambliss	22	2025

Single game
Rank	Player	TDs	Year	Opponent
1	Eli Manning	6	2001	Arkansas
1	Matt Corral	6	2020	Vanderbilt
1	Jaxson Dart	6	2024	Arkansas

== Rushing ==
=== Rushing yards ===
Career
Rank	Player	Yards	Years
1	Deuce McAllister	3,060	1997 1998 1999 2000
2	Joe Gunn	2,749	1998 1999 2000 2001
3	Quinshon Judkins	2,725	2022 2023
4	Kayo Dottley	2,654	1947 1948 1949 1950
5	Brandon Bolden	2,604	2008 2009 2010 2011
6	Dou Innocent	2,322	1991 1992 1994 1995
7	Jeff Scott	2,297	2010 2011 2012 2013
8	Jerrion Ealy	2,235	2019 2020 2021
9	BenJarvus Green-Ellis	2,137	2006 2007
10	Leon Perry	2,135	1976 1977 1978 1979

Single season
Rank	Player	Yards	Year
1	Quinshon Judkins	1,567	2022
	**Kewan Lacy**	1,567	2025
3	Kayo Dottley	1,312	1949
4	Dexter McCluster	1,169	2009
5	Quinshon Judkins	1,158	2023
6	BenJarvus Green-Ellis	1,137	2007
7	Deuce McAllister	1,082	1998
8	John Rhys Plumlee	1,023	2019
9	Jordan Wilkins	1,011	2017
10	BenJarvus Green-Ellis	1,000	2006

Single game
Rank	Player	Yards	Year	Opponent
1	Dexter McCluster	282	2009	Tennessee
2	Dou Innocent	242	1995	Mississippi State
3	Randy Baldwin	241	1990	Tulane
4	Kayo Dottley	235	1949	Chattanooga
5	Kayo Dottley	230	1949	TCU
6	Brandon Bolden	228	2010	Fresno State
7	BenJarvus Green-Ellis	226	2007	Missouri
8	**Kewan Lacy**	224	2025	Florida
9	Kayo Dottley	216	1949	Mississippi State
10	Stephen Hindman	215	1967	Vanderbilt

=== Rushing touchdowns ===
Career
Rank	Player	TDs	Years
1	Deuce McAllister	37	1997 1998 1999 2000
2	Quinshon Judkins	31	2022 2023
3	**Kewan Lacy**	29	2025 2026
4	Brandon Bolden	27	2008 2009 2010 2011
5	Snoop Conner	26	2019 2020 2021
6	John Fourcade	22	1978 1979 1980 1981
	Joe Gunn	22	1998 1999 2000 2001
8	Kayo Dottley	21	1947 1948 1949 1950
9	Randy Baldwin	20	1989 1990
	Jerrion Ealy	20	2019 2020 2021

Single season
Rank	Player	TDs	Year
1	**Kewan Lacy**	24	2025
2	Quinshon Judkins	16	2022
3	Quinshon Judkins	15	2023
4	Kayo Dottley	14	1949
	Archie Manning	14	1969
	Deuce McAllister	14	2000
	Brandon Bolden	14	2010
8	Snoop Conner	13	2021
9	Deuce McAllister	12	1999
	Scottie Phillips	12	2018
	John Rhys Plumlee	12	2019

Single game
Rank	Player	TDs	Year	Opponent
1	Showboat Boykin	7	1951	Mississippi State

== Receiving ==
=== Receptions ===
Career
Rank	Player	Rec	Years
1	Laquon Treadwell	202	2013 2014 2015
2	Chris Collins	198	2000 2001 2002 2003
3	A. J. Brown	189	2016 2017 2018
	Elijah Moore	189	2018 2019 2020
5	Shay Hodge	173	2006 2007 2008 2009
6	Evan Engram	162	2013 2014 2015 2016
7	Donte Moncrief	156	2011 2012 2013
8	Bill Flowers	149	2001 2002 2003 2004
9	Grant Heard	142	1996 1997 1998 1999 2000
	Jordan Watkins	142	2022 2023 2024

Single season
Rank	Player	Rec	Year
1	Elijah Moore	86	2020
2	A. J. Brown	85	2018
3	Laquon Treadwell	82	2015
4	Chris Collins	77	2003
5	Dontario Drummond	76	2021
6	A. J. Brown	75	2017
7	Laquon Treadwell	72	2013
8	Shay Hodge	70	2009
9	Elijah Moore	67	2019
10	Donte Moncrief	66	2012

Single game
Rank	Player	Rec	Year	Opponent
1	Laquon Treadwell	14	2015	Memphis
	A. J. Brown	14	2017	Louisiana-Lafayette
	Elijah Moore	14	2020	Vanderbilt
	Dontario Drummond	14	2021	Mississippi State
5	Barney Poole	13	1947	Chattanooga
	Floyd Franks	13	1969	Alabama
	Elijah Moore	13	2020	South Carolina
8	Elijah Moore	12	2020	Mississippi State
9	Bill Flowers	11	2002	Arkansas
	Elijah Moore	11	2018	South Carolina
	Elijah Moore	11	2020	Alabama
	Elijah Moore	11	2020	Arkansas
	Tre Harris	11	2023	Texas A&M
	Tre Harris	11	2024	Georgia Southern
	Tre Harris	11	2024	Kentucky

=== Receiving yards ===
Career
Rank	Player	Yards	Years
1	A. J. Brown	2,984	2016 2017 2018
2	Shay Hodge	2,646	2006 2007 2008 2009
3	Chris Collins	2,621	2000 2001 2002 2003
4	Elijah Moore	2,441	2018 2019 2020
5	Laquon Treadwell	2,393	2013 2014 2015
6	Donte Moncrief	2,371	2011 2012 2013
7	Evan Engram	2,320	2013 2014 2015 2016
8	Willie Green	2,274	1986 1987 1988 1989
9	Jordan Watkins	2,096	2022 2023 2024
10	Grant Heard	2,029	1996 1997 1998 1999 2000

Single season
Rank	Player	Yards	Year
1	A. J. Brown	1,320	2018
2	A. J. Brown	1,252	2017
3	Elijah Moore	1,193	2020
4	Laquon Treadwell	1,153	2015
5	Shay Hodge	1,135	2009
6	Tre Harris	1,030	2024
7	Dontario Drummond	1,028	2021
8	Tre Harris	985	2023
9	Donte Moncrief	979	2012
10	Malik Heath	971	2022

Single game
Rank	Player	Yards	Year	Opponent
1	Jordan Watkins	254	2024	Arkansas
2	Jonathan Mingo	247	2022	Vanderbilt
3	Elijah Moore	238	2020	Vanderbilt
4	A. J. Brown	233	2017	South Alabama
5	Elijah Moore	227	2020	Florida
6	Elijah Moore	225	2020	South Carolina
	Tre Harris	225	2024	Georgia Southern
8	Tre Harris	213	2023	Texas A&M
9	A. J. Brown	212	2018	Vanderbilt
10	Eddie Small	210	1993	Vanderbilt

=== Receiving touchdowns ===
Career
Rank	Player	TDs	Years
1	Chris Collins	24	2000 2001 2002 2003
2	Shay Hodge	22	2006 2007 2008 2009
3	Laquon Treadwell	21	2013 2014 2015
4	Donte Moncrief	20	2011 2012 2013
5	A. J. Brown	19	2016 2017 2018
6	Grant Heard	16	1996 1997 1998 1999 2000
	Elijah Moore	16	2018 2019 2020
8	Mike Wallace	15	2005 2006 2007 2008
	Evan Engram	15	2013 2014 2015 2016
	Dontario Drummond	15	2020 2021
	Tre Harris	15	2023 2024

Single season
Rank	Player	TDs	Year
1	Laquon Treadwell	11	2015
	A. J. Brown	11	2017
3	Chris Collins	10	2002
	Donte Moncrief	10	2012
5	Ken Toler	9	1980
	Grant Heard	9	2000
	Jordan Watkins	9	2024
8	Barney Poole	8	1947
	Burney Veazey	8	1972
	Roell Preston	8	1994
	Shay Hodge	8	2008
	Shay Hodge	8	2009
	Evan Engram	8	2016
	Elijah Moore	8	2020
	Dontario Drummond	8	2021
	Tre Harris	8	2023

Single game
Rank	Player	TDs	Year	Opponent
1	Jordan Watkins	5	2024	Arkansas
2	Tre Harris	4	2023	Mercer
3	Johnny Brewer	3	1960	Tulane
	Louis Guy	3	1962	Houston
	Pat Coleman	3	1989	Arkansas State
	Chris Collins	3	2001	Murray State
	Jason Armstead	3	2001	Arkansas
	Chris Collins	3	2002	Auburn
	Donte Moncrief	3	2012	Mississippi State
	Laquon Treadwell	3	2015	Oklahoma State
	Elijah Moore	3	2020	Vanderbilt
	Michael Trigg	3	2022	Central Arkansas

== Total offense ==
Total offense is the sum of passing and rushing statistics. It does not include receiving or returns.

=== Total offense yards ===
Career
Rank	Player	Yards	Years
1	Jaxson Dart	12,117	2022 2023 2024
2	Bo Wallace	10,478	2012 2013 2014
3	Eli Manning	9,984	2000 2001 2002 2003
4	Matt Corral	9,625	2018 2019 2020 2021
5	Chad Kelly	7,632	2015 2016
6	**Trinidad Chambliss**	7,582	2025 2026
7	John Fourcade	6,713	1978 1979 1980 1981
8	Romaro Miller	6,413	1997 1998 1999 2000
9	Kent Austin	6,179	1981 1982 1983 1984 1985
10	Jordan Ta'amu	6,107	2017 2018

Single season
Rank	Player	Yards	Year
1	Jaxson Dart	4,774	2024
2	Chad Kelly	4,542	2015
3	**Trinidad Chambliss**	4,464	2025
4	Jordan Ta'amu	4,260	2018
5	Matt Corral	3,963	2021
6	Matt Corral	3,843	2020
7	Jaxson Dart	3,755	2023
8	Bo Wallace	3,701	2013
9	Jaxson Dart	3,588	2022
10	Eli Manning	3,575	2003

Single game
Rank	Player	Yards	Year	Opponent
1	Jaxson Dart	562	2024	Arkansas
2	Archie Manning	540	1969	Alabama
3	Matt Corral	533	2020	South Carolina
4	Jordan Ta'amu	528	2018	Arkansas
5	Chad Kelly	505	2016	Auburn
6	Shea Patterson	495	2017	UT Martin
7	Chad Kelly	478	2015	Arkansas
8	Jordan Ta'amu	467	2018	Vanderbilt
9	Chad Kelly	464	2016	Alabama
10	Jaxson Dart	463	2022	Vanderbilt

=== Touchdowns responsible for ===
"Touchdowns responsible for" is the official NCAA term for combined passing and rushing touchdowns.

Career
Rank	Player	TDs	Years
1	Eli Manning	86	2000 2001 2002 2003
2	Jaxson Dart	84	2022 2023 2024
3	Bo Wallace	81	2012 2013 2014
4	Matt Corral	75	2018 2019 2020 2021
5	Chad Kelly	65	2015 2016
6	**Trinidad Chambliss**	61	2025 2026
7	Archie Manning	56	1968 1969 1970
8	Jevan Snead	52	2008 2009
9	John Fourcade	47	1978 1979 1980 1981
	Romaro Miller	47	1997 1998 1999 2000

Single season
Rank	Player	TDs	Year
1	Chad Kelly	41	2015
2	Matt Corral	33	2020
3	Eli Manning	32	2003
3	Jaxson Dart	32	2024
5	Eli Manning	31	2001
5	**Trinidad Chambliss**	31	2026
5	Bo Wallace	31	2012
5	Matt Corral	31	2021
5	Jaxson Dart	31	2023
10	Trinidad Chambliss	30	2025
10	Charlie Conerly	29	1947
10	Jevan Snead	29	2008

Single game
Rank	Player	TDs	Year	Opponent
1	Showboat Boykin	7	1951	Mississippi State
1	Matt Corral	7	2021	Tulane

== Defense ==
=== Interceptions ===
Career
Rank	Player	Ints	Years
1	Bobby Wilson	20	1946 1947 1948 1949
2	Glenn Cannon	19	1967 1968 1969
3	Harry Harrison	16	1971 1972 1973
4	Todd Sandroni	15	1987 1988 1989 1990
	Senquez Golson	15	2011 2012 2013 2014
6	Junie Hovious	14	1939 1940 1941
	Alundis Brice	14	1992 1993 1994
8	Von Hutchins	11	2000 2001 2002 2003
	Cody Prewitt	11	2011 2012 2013 2014
10	Jimmy Patton	10	1951 1952 1953 1954
	Tommy James	10	1965 1966 1967
	Ray Heidel	10	1968 1969 1970
	Chauncey Godwin	10	1988 1989 1990
	Syniker Taylor	10	1998 1999 2000 2001
	Travis Johnson	10	2002 2003 2004 2005

Single season
Rank	Player	Ints	Year
1	Bobby Wilson	10	1949
	Senquez Golson	10	2014
3	Harry Harrison	9	1972
4	Gerald Warfield	8	1966
5	Parker Hall	7	1938
	Junie Hovious	7	1940
	Glenn Cannon	7	1968
	Glenn Cannon	7	1969
	Ray Heidel	7	1970
	Todd Sandroni	7	1987
	Alundis Brice	7	1993
	Alundis Brice	7	1994

Single game
Rank	Player	Ints	Year	Opponent
1	James Kelly	3	1952	Arkansas
	Ray Brown	3	1958	Texas
	Tommy Luke	3	1965	Texas
	Gerald Warfield	3	1966	Houston
	Glenn Cannon	3	1968	LSU
	Gary Hall	3	1974	Tulane
	Don Price	3	1986	Vanderbilt
	Todd Sandroni	3	1988	Georgia

=== Tackles ===
Career
Rank	Player	Tackles	Years
1	Jeff Herrod	528	1984 1985 1986 1987
2	Kem Coleman	472	1974 1975 1976 1977
3	Abdul Jackson	394	1991 1992 1993 1994
4	Ben Williams	377	1972 1973 1974 1975
5	Thomas Hubbard	356	1981 1982 1983
6	Patrick Willis	355	2003 2004 2005 2006
7	Shawn Cobb	343	1987 1988 1989 1990
8	Eric Oliver	328	2001 2002 2003 2004
9	James Stuart	308	1971 1972 1973
10	Eddie Strong	306	1998 1999 2001 2002

Single season
Rank	Player	Tackles	Year
1	Jeff Herrod	168	1986
2	James Stuart	163	1973
3	Jeff Herrod	150	1989
4	Abdul Jackson	140	1993
5	Abdul Jackson	139	1994
5	Thomas Hubbard	139	1981
7	Patrick Willis	137	2006
8	Jeff Herrod	136	1985
8	Elmer Allen	136	1971
10	Kem Coleman	133	1976

=== Sacks ===
Career
Rank	Player	Sacks	Years
1	Marquis Haynes	32.0	2014 2015 2016 2017
2	Greg Hardy	26.5	2006 2007 2008 2009
3	**Suntarine Perkins**	23.0	2023 2024 2025 2026
4	Sam Williams	22.5	2019 2020 2021
5	Phillip Kent	21.0	1988 1989 1990 1991
6	Cedric Johnson	19.0	2020 2021 2022 2023
7	Kelvin Pritchett	18.0	1988 1989 1990
8	Derrick Burgess	17.5	1997 1998 1999 2000
9	Cassius Ware	17.0	1992 1993
10	Jared Ivey	16.0	2022 2023 2024

Single season
Rank	Player	Sacks	Year
1	Sam Williams	12.5	2021
2	Princely Umanmielen	10.5	2024
	Suntarine Perkins	10.5	2024
4	Phillip Kent	10.0	1990
	Dewayne Dotson	10.0	1992
	Greg Hardy	10.0	2007
	Marquis Haynes	10.0	2015
8	Derrick Burgess	9.5	2000
9	Andre Townsend	9.0	1983
	Cassius Ware	9.0	1993
	Princewill Umanmielen	9.0	2025

== Kicking ==
=== Field goals made ===
Career
Rank	Player	FGs	Years
1	Gary Wunderlich	64	2014 2015 2016 2017
2	Jonathan Nichols	63	2001 2002 2003 2004
3	Joshua Shene	57	2006 2007 2008 2009
4	**Lucas Carneiro**	45	2025 2026
5	Bryson Rose	43	2009 2010 2011 2012
6	Caden Davis	42	2023 2024
7	Brian Lee	41	1989 1990 1991 1992
	Luke Logan	41	2017 2018 2019 2020
9	Bryan Owen	38	1985 1986 1987 1988
10	Tim Montz	35	1993 1994 1995 1996

Single season
Rank	Player	FGs	Year
1	Lucas Carneiro	31	2025
2	Jonathan Nichols	25	2003
3	Caden Davis	24	2024
4	Gary Wunderlich	22	2016
	Luke Logan	22	2018
6	Jonathan Nichols	20	2004
7	Gary Wunderlich	19	2015
8	Bryson Rose	18	2012
	Caden Davis	18	2023
10	Joshua Shene	17	2008
	Gary Wunderlich	17	2017

Single game
Rank	Player	FGs	Year	Opponent
1	Jonathan Nichols	6	2003	Texas Tech
2	Brian Lee	5	1991	Tulane
	Bryson Rose	5	2010	Louisiana-Lafayette
	Luke Logan	5	2018	Vanderbilt
	Caden Davis	5	2024	Georgia

=== Field goal percentage ===
Career
Rank	Player	FG%	Years
1	Jonathan Cruz	88.2%	2022
2	**Lucas Carneiro**	84.9%	2025 2026
3	Caden Costa	83.3%	2021 2023
4	Gary Wunderlich	83.1%	2014 2015 2016
5	Caden Davis	80.8%	2023 2024
6	Les Binkley	79.3%	1999 2000
7	Jonathan Nichols	76.8%	2001 2002 2003 2004
8	Joshua Shene	76.0%	2006 2007 2008 2009
9	Bryson Rose	75.4%	2009 2010 2011 2012
10	Luke Logan	69.5%	2017 2018 2019 2020

Single season
Rank	Player	FG%	Year
1	Gary Wunderlich	95.7%	2016
2	Bryson Rose	88.9%	2010
3	Lucas Carneiro	88.6%	2025
4	Jonathan Cruz	88.2%	2022
5	Les Binkley	87.5%	1999
6	Jonathan Nichols	86.2%	2003
7	Caden Davis	82.8%	2024
8	Joshua Shene	82.4%	2006
	Caden Costa	82.4%	2021
10	Luke Logan	81.5%	2018
