= 2012 Ole Miss Rebels football team =

American college football season

2012 Ole Miss Rebels football

BBVA Compass Bowl champion

BBVA Compass Bowl, W 38–17 vs. Pittsburgh
- Conference: Southeastern Conference
- Western Division
- Record: 0–6, 7 wins vacated (0–5 SEC, 3 wins vacated)
- Head coach: Hugh Freeze (1st season)
- Co-offensive coordinators: Matt Luke (1st season); Dan Werner (3rd season)
- Offensive scheme: Spread
- Co-defensive coordinators: Dave Wommack (1st season); Wesley McGriff (1st season)
- Base defense: 4–3
- Home stadium: Vaught–Hemingway Stadium

2012 Southeastern Conference football standings
| | Conf. | | | Overall |
| Team | W | | L | W | | L |
|---|---|---|---|---|---|---|
Eastern Division
| No. T–5 Georgia xy | 7 | – | 1 | 12 | – | 2 |
| No. 9 Florida x% | 7 | – | 1 | 11 | – | 2 |
| No. 8 South Carolina | 6 | – | 2 | 11 | – | 2 |
| No. 23 Vanderbilt | 5 | – | 3 | 9 | – | 4 |
| Missouri | 2 | – | 6 | 5 | – | 7 |
| Tennessee | 1 | – | 7 | 5 | – | 7 |
| Kentucky | 0 | – | 8 | 2 | – | 10 |
Western Division
| No. 1 Alabama x$# | 7 | – | 1 | 13 | – | 1 |
| No. 14 LSU * | 6 | – | 2 | 10 | – | 3 |
| No. T–5 Texas A&M | 6 | – | 2 | 11 | – | 2 |
| Mississippi State | 4 | – | 4 | 8 | – | 5 |
| Ole Miss * | 3 | – | 5 | 7 | – | 6 |
| Arkansas | 2 | – | 6 | 4 | – | 8 |
| Auburn | 0 | – | 8 | 3 | – | 9 |
Championship: Alabama 32, Georgia 28
# – BCS National Champion; $ – BCS representative as conference champion; % – BCS at-large representative; x – Division champion/co-champions; y – Championship game participant; * Ole Miss and LSU vacated all wins due to NCAA violations.; Rankings from AP Poll

The 2012 Ole Miss Rebels football team represented the University of Mississippi in the 2012 NCAA Division I FBS football season. The team was coached by Hugh Freeze, who was in his first season with Ole Miss. The Rebels played their home games at Vaught–Hemingway Stadium in Oxford, Mississippi, and competed in the Western Division of the Southeastern Conference (SEC).

On February 11, 2019, Ole Miss announced the vacation of all wins in the years 2010, 2011, 2012, and 2016. In 2013, all wins except the Music City Bowl were vacated. In 2014, all wins except the Presbyterian game were vacated.

== Personnel ==
=== Coaching staff ===
| Name | Position | Year at Ole Miss | Alma mater (Year) |
|---|---|---|---|
| Hugh Freeze | Head Coach | 1st | Southern Miss (1992) |
| Matt Luke | Co-offensive coordinator/offensive line | 1st | Ole Miss (2000) |
| Dan Werner | Co-offensive coordinator/quarterbacks | 1st | Western Michigan (1983) |
| Wesley McGriff | Co-defensive coordinator/cornerbacks | 1st | Savannah State (1990) |
| Dave Wommack | Defensive coordinator/safeties | 1st | Missouri Southern State (1978) |
| Tom Allen | Special teams coordinator/linebackers | 1st | Maranatha Baptist (1992) |
| Chris Kiffin | Defensive line/recruiting coordinator For Defense | 1st | Colorado State (2005) |
| Maurice Harris | Tight ends/recruiting coordinator For Offense | 1st | Arkansas State (1998) |
| Grant Heard | Wide receivers | 1st | Ole Miss (2001) |
| Derrick Nix | Running backs | 5th | Southern Miss (2002) |
| Paul Jackson | Head Strength & Conditioning Coach | 1st | Montclair State (2006) |
| Tray Scott | Graduate assistant | 1st | Arkansas Tech (2008) |

== Schedule ==
| Date | Time | Opponent | Site | TV | Result | Attendance |
|---|---|---|---|---|---|---|
| September 1 | 6:00 pm | No. 24 (FCS) Central Arkansas* | Vaught–Hemingway Stadium; Oxford, MS | CSS PPV | W 49–27 (vacated) | 50,544 |
| September 8 | 6:00 pm | UTEP* | Vaught–Hemingway Stadium; Oxford, MS | SECRN | W 28–10 (vacated) | 53,133 |
| September 15 | 8:15 pm | No. 14 Texas* | Vaught–Hemingway Stadium; Oxford, MS | ESPN | L 31–66 | 61,797 |
| September 22 | 11:00 am | at Tulane* | Mercedes-Benz Superdome; New Orleans, LA (rivalry) | FSN | W 39–0 (vacated) | 28,913 |
| September 29 | 8:15 pm | at No. 1 Alabama | Bryant–Denny Stadium; Tuscaloosa, AL (rivalry) | ESPN | L 14–33 | 101,821 |
| October 6 | 6:00 pm | Texas A&M | Vaught–Hemingway Stadium; Oxford, MS | ESPNU | L 27–30 | 55,343 |
| October 13 | 11:21 am | Auburn^{†} | Vaught–Hemingway Stadium; Oxford, MS (rivalry) | SECN | W 41–20 (vacated) | 57,068 |
| October 27 | 11:21 am | at Arkansas | War Memorial Stadium; Little Rock, AR (rivalry) | SECN | W 30–27 (vacated) | 55,378 |
| November 3 | 2:30 pm | at No. 7 Georgia | Sanford Stadium; Athens, GA | CBS | L 10–37 | 92,746 |
| November 10 | 6:00 pm | Vanderbilt | Vaught–Hemingway Stadium; Oxford, MS (rivalry) | ESPNU | L 26–27 | 60,572 |
| November 17 | 2:30 pm | at No. 8 LSU | Tiger Stadium; Baton Rouge, LA (Magnolia Bowl) | CBS | L 35–41 | 92,872 |
| November 24 | 6:00 pm | No. 25 Mississippi State | Vaught–Hemingway Stadium; Oxford, MS (Egg Bowl) | ESPNU | W 41–24 (vacated) | 61,005 |
| January 5 | 1:00 pm | vs. Pittsburgh* | Legion Field; Birmingham, AL (BBVA Compass Bowl) | ESPN | W 38–17 (vacated) | 59,135 |
*Non-conference game; ^{†}Homecoming; Rankings from AP Poll Poll released prior to the game; All times are in Central time

== Game summaries ==
=== Central Arkansas ===
| Team | 1 | 2 | 3 | 4 | Total |
|---|---|---|---|---|---|
| #24 (FCS) Central Arkansas | 7 | 13 | 0 | 7 | 27 |
| • Ole Miss | 14 | 0 | 14 | 21 | 49 |

- Location: Oxford, Mississippi
- Game start: 6:06 p.m.
- Elapsed time: 3:12
- Game attendance: 50,544
- Game weather: 88 °F (31 °C), Fair, winds SW at 14 mph
- Referee: Matt Loeffler
- TV announcers (CSS): Richard Cross and Brett Norsworthy

=== UTEP ===
| Team | 1 | 2 | 3 | 4 | Total |
|---|---|---|---|---|---|
| UTEP | 0 | 0 | 10 | 0 | 10 |
| • Ole Miss | 7 | 14 | 0 | 7 | 28 |

- Location: Oxford, Mississippi
- Game start: 6:06 p.m.
- Elapsed time: 3:09
- Game attendance: 53,133
- Game weather: 75, Fair
- Referee: Marc Curles
- Television network: FSN

=== Texas ===
| Team | 1 | 2 | 3 | 4 | Total |
|---|---|---|---|---|---|
| • #14 Texas | 10 | 21 | 21 | 14 | 66 |
| Ole Miss | 0 | 10 | 14 | 7 | 31 |

- Location: Oxford, Mississippi
- Game start: 8:26 p.m.
- Elapsed time: 3:24
- Game attendance: 61,797
- Game weather: 79 °F (26 °C), Fair, winds ENE 7 mph
- Referee: Randy Christal
- TV announcers (ESPN): Joe Tessitore (play-by-play), Matt Millen (color), Shannon Spake (sideline)

Scoring summary
| 1 | 9:41 | TEX | Steve Edmond 22-yard interception return (Nick Jordan kick) | TEX 7–0 |
| 1 | 3:01 | TEX | Nick Jordan 31-yard field goal | TEX 10–0 |
| 2 | 14:54 | MISS | Randall Mackey 3-yard run (Bryson Rose kick) | TEX 10–7 |
| 2 | 13:35 | TEX | Marquise Goodwin 69-yard run (Nick Jordan kick) | TEX 17–7 |
| 2 | 8:50 | MISS | Bryson Rose 39-yard field goal | TEX 17–10 |
| 2 | 6:34 | TEX | D.J. Grant 3-yard pass from David Ash (Nick Jordan kick) | TEX 24–10 |
| 2 | 0:12 | TEX | Ryan Roberson 1-yard pass from David Ash (Nick Jordan kick) | TEX 31–10 |
| 3 | 11:40 | TEX | D.J. Monroe 10-yard run (Nick Jordan kick) | TEX 38–10 |
| 3 | 10:39 | MISS | Dante Moncrief 75-yard pass from Bo Wallace (Bryson Rose kick) | TEX 38–17 |
| 3 | 6:51 | TEX | Malcolm Brown 5-yard run (Nick Jordan kick) | TEX 45–17 |
| 3 | 4:41 | MISS | Jeff Scott 48-yard run (Bryson Rose kick) | TEX 45–24 |
| 3 | 2:30 | TEX | Mike Davis 46-yard pass from David Ash (Nick Jordan kick) | TEX 52–24 |
| 4 | 14:23 | TEX | Malcolm Brown 12-yard run (Nick Jordan kick) | TEX 59–24 |
| 4 | 14:05 | MISS | Jaylen Walton 100-yard kickoff return (Bryson Rose kick) | TEX 59–31 |
| 4 | 11:27 | TEX | Marquise Goodwin 55-yard pass from David Ash (Nick Jordan kick) | TEX 66–31 |

=== Tulane ===
| Team | 1 | 2 | 3 | 4 | Total |
|---|---|---|---|---|---|
| • Ole Miss | 26 | 0 | 10 | 3 | 39 |
| Tulane | 0 | 0 | 0 | 0 | 0 |

- Location: New Orleans, Louisiana
- Game start: 11:00 a.m.
- Elapsed time: 3:13
- Game attendance: 28,913
- Game weather: Indoors
- Referee: Steve LaMantia
- Television network: FSN
- Sources: ESPN

Scoring summary
| 1 | 12:50 | MISS | Jeff Scott 13-yard run (pass failed) | MISS 6-0 |
| 1 | 6:24 | MISS | Ja-Mes Logan 14-yard run (run failed) | MISS 12-0 |
| 1 | 3:04 | MISS | Randall Mackey 28-yard run (Bryson Rose kick) | MISS 19-0 |
| 1 | 1:24 | MISS | Donte Moncrief 23-yard pass from Bo Wallace (Bryson Rose kick) | MISS 26-0 |
| 3 | 7:56 | MISS | Jeff Scott 4-yard run (Bryson Rose kick) | MISS 33-0 |
| 3 | 4:50 | MISS | Bryson Rose 40-yard field goal | MISS 36-0 |
| 4 | 5:09 | MISS | Bryson Rose 47-yard field goal | MISS 39-0 |

=== Alabama ===
| Team | 1 | 2 | 3 | 4 | Total |
|---|---|---|---|---|---|
| Ole Miss | 0 | 7 | 7 | 0 | 14 |
| • #1 Alabama | 6 | 21 | 0 | 6 | 33 |

- Location: Tuscaloosa, Alabama
- Game start: 8:26 p.m.
- Elapsed time: 3:15
- Game attendance: 101,821
- Game weather: 72 °F (22 °C), Overcast, Winds NNW at 3 mph (4.8 km/h)
- Referee: Penn Wagers
- TV announcers (ESPN): Joe Tessitore (play-by-play), Matt Millen (color), Shannon Spake (sideline)

Scoring summary
| 1 | 7:17 | Alabama | Jeremy Shelley 38-yard field goal | Alabama 3–0 |
| 1 | 3:03 | Alabama | Jeremy Shelley 38-yard field goal | Alabama 6–0 |
| 2 | 13:40 | Ole Miss | Jeff Scott one-yard run (Bryson Rose kick) | Ole Miss 7–6 |
| 2 | 13:25 | Alabama | Christion Jones 99-yard kickoff return (Jeremy Shelley kick) | Alabama 13–7 |
| 2 | 10:30 | Alabama | Amari Cooper 16-yard pass from A. J. McCarron (Jeremy Shelley kick) | Alabama 20–7 |
| 2 | 1:37 | Alabama | Amari Cooper 12-yard pass from A. J. McCarron (Jeremy Shelley kick) | Alabama 27–7 |
| 3 | 6:35 | Ole Miss | Randall Mackey 12-yard run (Bryson Rose kick) | Alabama 27–14 |
| 4 | 12:19 | Alabama | Jeremy Shelley 26-yard field goal | Alabama 30–14 |
| 4 | 1:41 | Alabama | Jeremy Shelley 24-yard field goal | Alabama 33–14 |

=== Texas A&M ===
| Team | 1 | 2 | 3 | 4 | Total |
|---|---|---|---|---|---|
| • Texas A&M | 7 | 10 | 0 | 13 | 30 |
| Ole Miss | 10 | 7 | 3 | 7 | 27 |

- Location: Oxford, Mississippi
- Game start: 6:00 p.m.
- Elapsed time: 3:25
- Game attendance: 55,343
- Game weather: 50 degrees, Cloudy, winds N at 7 mph
- Referee: Marc Curles
- TV announcers (ESPNU): Clay Matvick (play-by-play), Matt Stinchcomb (color), Angelina Mallen (sideline)

Scoring summary
| 1 | 14:11 | Texas A&M | Ben Malena 59 Yard Run (Taylor Bertolet Kick) | Texas A&M 7–0 |
| 1 | 8:32 | Ole Miss | Jeff Scott 1 Yard Run (Bryson Rose Kick) | Tied 7–7 |
| 1 | 6:07 | Ole Miss | Bryson Rose 46 Yard Field Goal | Ole Miss 10–7 |
| 2 | 10:09 | Texas A&M | Taylor Bertolet 19 Yard Field Goal | Tied 10–10 |
| 2 | 3:39 | Ole Miss | Bo Wallace 14 Yard Run (Bryson Rose Kick) | Ole Miss 17–10 |
| 2 | 0:42 | Texas A&M | Steven Jenkins 37 Yard Interception Return (Taylor Bertolet Kick) | Tied 17–17 |
| 3 | 7:36 | Ole Miss | Bryson Rose 28 Yard Field Goal | Ole Miss 20–17 |
| 4 | 14:56 | Ole Miss | Donte Moncrief 4 Yard Pass From Bo Wallace (Bryson Rose Kick) | Ole Miss 27–17 |
| 4 | 6:24 | Texas A&M | Johnny Manziel 29 Yard Run (PAT Failed) | Ole Miss 27–23 |
| 4 | 1:46 | Texas A&M | Ryan Swope 20 Yard Pass From Johnny Manziel (Taylor Bertolet Kick) | Texas A&M 30–27 |

=== Auburn ===
| Team | 1 | 2 | 3 | 4 | Total |
|---|---|---|---|---|---|
| Auburn | 0 | 17 | 3 | 0 | 20 |
| • Ole Miss | 14 | 3 | 7 | 17 | 41 |

- Location: Oxford, Mississippi
- Game start: 11:21 a.m.
- Elapsed time: 3:23
- Game attendance: 57,068
- Game weather: 72, Fair, Wind S 3 mph
- Referee: Ken Williamson
- TV announcers (SEC Network): Dave Neal (play-by-play), Andre Ware (color), Cara Capuano (sideline)

=== Arkansas ===
| Team | 1 | 2 | 3 | 4 | Total |
|---|---|---|---|---|---|
| • Ole Miss | 0 | 21 | 3 | 6 | 30 |
| Arkansas | 10 | 7 | 0 | 10 | 27 |

- Location: Little Rock, Arkansas
- Game start: 11:21 a.m.
- Elapsed time: 3:41
- Game attendance: 55,378
- Game weather: 49, Sunny
- Referee: Penn Wagers
- TV announcers (SEC Network): Dave Neal (play-by-play), Andre Ware (color), Cara Capuano (sideline)

=== Georgia ===
| Team | 1 | 2 | 3 | 4 | Total |
|---|---|---|---|---|---|
| Ole Miss | 3 | 7 | 0 | 0 | 10 |
| • #7 Georgia | 0 | 14 | 16 | 7 | 37 |

- Location: Athens, Georgia
- Game start: 3:39 p.m.
- Elapsed time: 3:19
- Game attendance: 92,746
- Game weather: 78, Sunny
- Referee: Ken Williamson
- TV announcers (CBS): Tim Brando (play-by-play), Steve Beuerlein (color)

=== Vanderbilt ===
| Team | 1 | 2 | 3 | 4 | Total |
|---|---|---|---|---|---|
| • Vanderbilt | 3 | 3 | 14 | 7 | 27 |
| Ole Miss | 7 | 9 | 7 | 3 | 26 |

- Location: Oxford, Mississippi
- Game start: 6:06 p.m.
- Elapsed time: 3:46
- Game attendance: 60,572
- Game weather: 72, Fair
- Referee: Marc Curles
- TV announcers (ESPNU): Clay Matvick (play-by-play), Matt Stinchcomb (color), Jessica Mendoza (sideline)

=== LSU ===
Magnolia Bowl

| Team | 1 | 2 | 3 | 4 | Total |
|---|---|---|---|---|---|
| Ole Miss | 14 | 7 | 7 | 7 | 35 |
| • #8 LSU | 7 | 10 | 3 | 21 | 41 |

- Location: Baton Rouge, Louisiana
- Game start: 2:39 p.m.
- Elapsed time: 3:46
- Game attendance: 92,872
- Game weather: 69, Sunny
- Referee: Matt Moore
- TV announcers (CBS): Verne Lundquist (play-by-play), Gary Danielson (color), Tracy Wolfson (sideline)

=== Mississippi State ===
Egg Bowl

| Team | 1 | 2 | 3 | 4 | Total |
|---|---|---|---|---|---|
| #25 Miss State | 14 | 3 | 0 | 7 | 24 |
| • Ole Miss | 7 | 10 | 17 | 7 | 41 |

- Location: Oxford, Mississippi
- Game start: 6:06 p.m.
- Elapsed time: 3:20
- Game attendance: 61,005
- Game weather: 39, Fair
- Referee: Tom Ritter
- TV announcers (ESPNU): Clay Matvick (play-by-play), Matt Stinchcomb (color), Jessica Mendoza (sideline)

=== Pittsburgh ===
BBVA Compass Bowl

| Team | 1 | 2 | 3 | 4 | Total |
|---|---|---|---|---|---|
| Pittsburgh | 0 | 10 | 0 | 7 | 17 |
| • Ole Miss | 14 | 10 | 7 | 7 | 38 |

- Location: Birmingham, Alabama
- Game start: 12:05 p.m.
- Elapsed time: 3:23
- Game attendance: 59,135
- Referee: Reggie Smith
- Television network: ESPN
