= 2008 Ole Miss Rebels football team =

American college football season

2008 Ole Miss Rebels football

Cotton Bowl Classic champion

Cotton Bowl Classic, W 47–34 vs. Texas Tech
- Conference: Southeastern Conference
- Western Division

Ranking
- Coaches: No. 15
- AP: No. 14
- Record: 9–4 (5–3 SEC)
- Head coach: Houston Nutt (1st season)
- Offensive coordinator: Kent Austin (1st season)
- Offensive scheme: Pro-style, Wild Rebel
- Defensive coordinator: Tyrone Nix (1st season)
- Base defense: 4–3
- Home stadium: Vaught–Hemingway Stadium (Capacity: 60,580)

2008 Southeastern Conference football standings
	Conf.			Overall
Team	W		L	W		L
Eastern Division
No. 1 Florida x$#	7	–	1	13	–	1
No. 13 Georgia	6	–	2	10	–	3
Vanderbilt	4	–	4	7	–	6
South Carolina	4	–	4	7	–	6
Tennessee	3	–	5	5	–	7
Kentucky	2	–	6	7	–	6
Western Division
No. 6 Alabama x%	8	–	0	12	–	2
No. 14 Ole Miss	5	–	3	9	–	4
LSU	3	–	5	8	–	5
Arkansas	2	–	6	5	–	7
Auburn	2	–	6	5	–	7
Mississippi State	2	–	6	4	–	8
Championship: Florida 31, Alabama 20
# – BCS National Champion; $ – BCS representative as conference champion; % – BCS at-large representative; x – Division champion/co-champions; Rankings from AP Poll

The 2008 Ole Miss Rebels football team represented the University of Mississippi during the 2008 NCAA Division I FBS football season. The team's head coach was Houston Nutt, who served his first season in the position and replaced Ed Orgeron, who was fired after accumulating a 10–25 record at Ole Miss from 2005 to 2007. The Rebels played their seven home games in 2008 at Vaught–Hemingway Stadium in Oxford, Mississippi.

With an 8–4 regular-season record and a 5–3 mark in the SEC, head coach Houston Nutt revived a Rebel squad that was coming off four straight losing seasons and a 3–9 campaign with no conference wins in 2007. It marked the team's best improvement from one season to the next since former coach Johnny Vaught's debut in 1947. Projected to place fifth in the SEC Western Division in the pre-season, the Rebels finished second in the division, having defeated the previous two national champions on the road, #4 Florida and #18 LSU, and ended the regular season on a five-game win streak.

On December 8, the Associated Press announced that Rebels offensive tackle Michael Oher, defensive tackle Peria Jerry and kicker Joshua Sheene were selected for the first team of the Associated Press All-Southeastern team. Oher was a unanimous pick. Receiver Dexter McCluster was a second-team pick. On December 9, the Southeastern Conference announced that Oher and Jerry were named to the first team of the All-SEC team selected by the 12 league coaches. On December 10, the Southeastern Conference announced that Ole Miss head coach Houston Nutt was named the Southeastern Conference coach of the year, sharing the award with Alabama's Nick Saban and Vanderbilt's Bobby Johnson. Michael Oher was awarded the Jacobs Blocking Trophy, given to the league's top blocker. The 2008 College Football All-America Team included Michael Oher and Peria Jerry.

== Schedule ==
Date	Time	Opponent	Rank	Site	TV	Result	Attendance	Source
August 30	6:00 pm	Memphis*		Vaught–Hemingway Stadium; Oxford, MS (rivalry)		W 41–24	56,127	
September 6	2:30 pm	at No. 20 Wake Forest*		BB&T Field; Winston-Salem, NC	ABC/ESPN2	L 28–30	31,986	
September 13	6:00 pm	Samford*		Vaught–Hemingway Stadium; Oxford, MS		W 34–10	52,780	
September 20	6:00 pm	Vanderbilt		Vaught–Hemingway Stadium; Oxford, MS (rivalry)		L 17–23	51,281	
September 27	11:30 am	at No. 4 Florida		Ben Hill Griffin Stadium; Gainesville, FL	Raycom	W 31–30	90,106	
October 4	1:00 pm	South Carolina^{†}		Vaught–Hemingway Stadium; Oxford, MS	PPV	L 24–31	54,628	
October 18	2:35 pm	at No. 2 Alabama		Bryant–Denny Stadium; Tuscaloosa, AL (rivalry)	CBS	L 20–24	92,138	
October 25	6:00 pm	at Arkansas		Donald W. Reynolds Razorback Stadium; Fayetteville, AR (rivalry)	PPV	W 23–21	74,168	
November 1	11:30 pm	Auburn		Vaught–Hemingway Stadium; Oxford, MS (rivalry)	Raycom	W 17–7	57,324	
November 15	1:00 pm	Louisiana-Monroe*		Vaught–Hemingway Stadium; Oxford, MS		W 59–0	43,665	
November 22	2:30 pm	at No. 18 LSU		Tiger Stadium; Baton Rouge, LA (Magnolia Bowl)	CBS	W 31–13	92,649	
November 28	11:30 am	Mississippi State	No. 25	Vaught–Hemingway Stadium; Oxford, MS (Egg Bowl)	Raycom	W 45–0	55,231	
January 2	1:00 pm	vs. No. 8 Texas Tech*	No. 20	Cotton Bowl; Dallas, TX (Cotton Bowl Classic)	FOX	W 47–34	88,175	
*Non-conference game; ^{†}Homecoming; Rankings from AP Poll released prior to the game; All times are in Central time

== Rankings ==
Ranking movements Legend: ██ Increase in ranking ██ Decrease in ranking — = Not ranked
	Week																
Poll	Pre	1	2	3	4	5	6	7	8	9	10	11	12	13	14	15	Final
AP	—	—	—	—	—	—	—	—	—	—	—	—	—	25	22	20	14
Coaches	—	—	—	—	—	—	—	—	—	—	—	—	—	—	25	24	15
Harris	Not released					—	—	—	—	—	—	—	—	—	24	23	Not released
BCS	Not released								—	—	—	—	—	—	—	25	Not released

- Harris Interactive publishes their final ranking on Week 15 (the end of the season), before the bowl games are played. The Bowl Championship Series final standings are released on Week 15. Neither publish a ranking or standing after the bowl games are complete.

== Game summaries ==
=== Memphis ===
	1	2	3	4	Total
Memphis	7	3	0	14	24
Ole Miss	14	13	7	7	41

Ole Miss opened the 2008 season with new head football coach Houston Nutt by beating state-line rival Memphis, 41–24. The game started off quick for the Rebs as Jevan Snead hit Shay Hodge for a 70 yd TD strike on the game's second possession and never looked back. The game also featured the introduction of the "Wild Rebel" off of which Dexter McCluster scored a touchdown.

=== Wake Forest ===
	1	2	3	4	Total
Ole Miss	7	7	0	14	28
#20 Wake Forest	7	3	10	10	30

Ole Miss lost 30–28 after Wake Forest kicked a 42-yard field foal with three seconds remaining in the game. In a game with several lead changes, Ole Miss took the lead with just over one minute remaining in the fourth quarter on a fourth and goal Jevan Snead touchdown pass. Wake Forest played down the field in 53 seconds, aided by 2 penalties, to set up the game-winning field goal.

=== Samford ===
	1	2	3	4	Total
Samford	7	0	0	3	10
Ole Miss	3	17	7	7	34

=== Vanderbilt ===
	1	2	3	4	Total
Vanderbilt	14	3	0	6	23
Ole Miss	17	0	0	0	17

Ole Miss lost to the Vanderbilt Commodores in the final minute of the game as Vanderbilt forced Ole Miss' Dexter McCluster to fumble the game-winning touchdown at the goal line.

=== At Florida ===
Ole Miss Rebels (2–2) at #4 Florida Gators (3–0)

Quarter	1	2	3	4	Total
Ole Miss	7	0	17	7	31
Florida	0	17	0	13	30

at Ben Hill Griffith Stadium, Gainesville, Florida

- Date: September 27, 2008
- Game time: 12:30 p.m.
- Game weather: Clear, 85 °F (29 °C)
- Game attendance: 90,106
- Referee: Hubert Owens
- TV: Raycom
- Box Score

Game information

First quarter

- MISS – Jevan Snead 1-yard run (Joshua Shene kick), 3:12. Ole Miss 7–0. Drive: 10 plays, 70 yards, 4:24.

Second quarter

- FLA – Jonathan Phillips 32-yard field goal, 13:31. Ole Miss 7–3. Drive: 12 plays, 46 yards, 4:41.
- FLA – Percy Harvin 43-yard pass from Tim Tebow (Jonathan Phillips kick), 12:26. Florida 10–7. Drive: 1 plays, 43 yards, 0:12.
- FLA – Tim Tebow 1-yard run (Jonathan Phillips kick), 1:06. Florida 17–7. Drive: 5 plays, 81 yards, 1:20.

Third quarter

- MISS – Joshua Shene 33-yard field goal, 11:00. Florida 17–10. Drive: 7 plays, 19 yards, 3:36.
- MISS – Cordera Eason 18-yard pass from Jevan Snead (Joshua Shene kick), 10:30. Tie 17–17. Drive: 3 plays, 18 yards, 0:19.
- MISS – Dexter McCluster 40-yard run (Joshua Shene kick), 0:52. Ole Miss 24–17. Drive: 7 plays, 72 yards, 3:42.

Fourth quarter

- FLA – Tim Tebow 1-yard run (Jonathan Phillips kick), 11:26. Tie 24–24. Drive: 9 plays, 49 yards, 4:26.
- MISS – Shay Hodge 86-yard pass from Jevan Snead (Joshua Shene kick), 5:26. Ole Miss 31–24. Drive: 3 plays, 89 yards, 1:28.
- FLA – Percy Harvin 15-yard run (kick blocked), 3:28. Ole Miss 31–30. Drive: 6 plays, 68 yards, 1:58.

Top passers

- MISS – Jevan Snead – 9/20, 185 yards, 2 TD, INT
- FLA – Tim Tebow – 24/38, 319 yards, TD

Top rushers

- MISS – Dexter McCluster – 11 rushes, 60 yards, TD
- FLA – Percy Harvin – 10 rushes, 82 yards, TD

Top receivers

- MISS – Shay Hodge – 3 receptions, 133 yards, TD
- FLA – Percy Harvin – 13 receptions, 186 yards, TD

The Ole Miss Rebels posted its 600th win in school history on September 27, 2008 when it defeated the Florida Gators 31–30 at Ben Hill Griffin Stadium in Gainesville, Florida, giving the season's conference champion, Florida, its only loss of the 2008 season. This was also Ole Miss' first win over a Top 5 ranked team since 1977 when the Rebels defeated Notre Dame. Notre Dame went on to win the national championship that year.

Florida went into the game undefeated at 3–0. Never trailing Ole Miss by more than a touchdown, Florida came within an extra point of tying the game at the end of the fourth quarter. Ole Miss had different plans in mind, however, as the extra point kick was blocked, and Florida was held to 30. While the defense was able to force a punt out of Ole Miss on the next possession and get the ball back inside Ole Miss territory, Florida found itself with the choice between converting a 4th-and-1 situation or attempting a long field goal. Florida opted to go for the first down, but the Ole Miss defense stopped QB Tim Tebow and he did not convert the one-yard run. The game ended as time expired during Ole Miss' ensuing possession.

Florida won their remaining regular season games and went on to defeat #1 Alabama in the 2008 SEC Championship. Florida then defeated #2 Oklahoma to claim the 2009 FedEx BCS National Championship.

=== South Carolina ===
	1	2	3	4	Total
South Carolina	3	14	7	7	31
Ole Miss	14	7	0	3	24

Following Ole Miss' win over Florida, Sports Illustrated featured Ole Miss on the cover. Then Ole Miss went on to lose to South Carolina in what many Ole Miss fans refer to as the continuation of the Sports Illustrated Cover Jinx. The last time Ole Miss was featured on the Sports Illustrated cover was in 1970. After the cover ran, which was a picture of then Ole Miss quarterback Archie Manning, Manning suffered a broken arm during the season. On more than one occasion, the Rebels had a chance to pull away, but South Carolina forced timely turnovers to keep themselves alive. In the end, the Rebs gave one too many gifts to SC and the Gamecocks were able to sneak out of Oxford with a win.

=== Alabama ===
	1	2	3	4	Total
Ole Miss	3	0	7	10	20
#2 Alabama	7	17	0	0	24

After several early failed drives in the opening quarter, Ole Miss became the first team to score on Alabama in the first quarter, as well as the first to have a lead against the Crimson Tide. However, the Crimson Tide answered back on their next drive with a touchdown, giving Alabama a 7–3 lead to end the first quarter. Ole Miss had limited offense in the second quarter as the Tide defense held a shutout for the remainder of the half. However, the Tide offense scored 17 points with a 2-yard rush touchdown, a 41-yard field goal, and a 30-yard touchdown pass. Alabama led the Rebels 24–3 at halftime.

However, the second half was different as the Crimson Tide failed to score for the remainder of the game. Ole Miss head coach Houston Nutt, who had previously coached at Arkansas, gambled on a 4th–and–goal with a fake field goal attempt, as Rob Park passed to Jason Cook for a 9-yard touchdown. Several minutes into the fourth quarter, Ole Miss again cut into Alabama's lead when Jevan Snead threw a 17-yard touchdown strike to Shay Hodge, as the Rebels trailed 24–17 after a Joshua Shene extra point. Three minutes later, Shene hit a 35-yard field goal, cutting Alabama's lead again to 24–20. A stalled drive forced Alabama punter P. J. Fitzgerald to give the ball to the Rebels with 3:03 left. The Rebels moved the ball steadily down the field over the next two minutes, however they turned it over on downs after a failed 4th–and–5 on Alabama's 43-yard line.

=== Arkansas ===
	1	2	3	4	Total
Ole Miss	3	10	0	10	23
Arkansas	0	7	0	14	21

Ole Miss head coach Houston Nutt returned to Arkansas in his first game against his former team, the Arkansas Razorbacks. Ole Miss, and Houston Nutt, won 23–21.

=== Auburn ===
	1	2	3	4	Total
Auburn	0	0	7	0	7
Ole Miss	0	10	0	7	17

The Auburn rivalry had been running steady ever since Head coach Tommy Tuberville bolted Oxford for the Plains. In his fifth, and what would be his final return trip, the Rebels were finally able to emerge as a winner. In a defensive struggle, the Rebels picked off the Tigers three times in the fourth quarter, and were able to put the game away on a Brandon Bolden touchdown run midway through the fourth quarter. The final count, Ole Miss 17 Auburn 7

=== Louisiana Monroe ===
	1	2	3	4	Total
Louisiana Monroe	0	0	0	0	0
Ole Miss	7	31	14	7	59

Ole Miss shutout Louisiana Monroe 59–0 to become bowl eligible for the first time since 2003.

=== LSU ===
Ole Miss at #18 LSU

Team	1	2	3	4	Total
• Ole Miss	7	14	7	3	31
LSU	0	10	3	0	13

- Date: November 22
- Location: Tiger Stadium, Baton Rouge, Louisiana
- Game start: 3:30 p.m. EST
- TV announcers (CBS): Verne Lundquist (play-by-play), Gary Danielson (color), Tracy Wolfson & Allie LaForce (sideline)

Scoring summary
1	11:00	MISS	Mike Wallace 34-yard pass from Jevan Snead (Joshua Shene kick)	MISS 7-0
2	13:37	LSU	Colt David 46-yard field goal	MISS 7-3
2	9:01	MISS	Brandon Bolden 3-yard run (Joshua Shene kick)	MISS 14-3
2	5:36	MISS	Mike Wallace 25-yard pass from Jevan Snead (Joshua Shene kick)	MISS 21-3
2	2:13	LSU	Terrence Toliver 9-yard pass from Jordan Jefferson (Colt David kick)	MISS 21-10
3	11:11	LSU	Colt David 52-yard field goal	MISS 21-13
3	7:53	MISS	Markeith Summers 13-yard run (Joshua Shene kick)	MISS 28-13
4	4:23	MISS	Joshua Shene 19-yard field goal	MISS 31-13

In this 97th meeting of Ole Miss and LSU, the first time referred to as the Magnolia Bowl, Ole Miss snapped a six-game losing streak against LSU, beating the defending national champions 31–13. Ole Miss' last win against LSU was in 2001.

=== Mississippi State ===
Mississippi State at #25 Ole Miss

Team	1	2	3	4	Total
Mississippi St	0	0	0	0	0
• Ole Miss	24	7	7	7	45

- Date: November 28
- Location: Vaught–Hemingway Stadium, Oxford, Mississippi
- Game start: 12:30 p.m. EST
- Source: ESPN

Scoring summary
1	12:40	MISS	Dexter McCluster 36-yard run (Joshua Shene kick)	MISS 7-0
1	8:08	MISS	Joshua Shene 43-yard field goal	MISS 10-0
1	4:31	MISS	Shay Hodge 10-yard pass from Jevan Snead (Joshua Shene kick)	MISS 17-0
1	0:36	MISS	Mike Wallace 17-yard pass from Jevan Snead (Joshua Shene kick)	MISS 24-0
2	0:42	MISS	Mike Wallace 72-yard pass from Jevan Snead (Joshua Shene kick)	MISS 31-0
3	7:09	MISS	Bradley Sowell 1-yard pass from Jevan Snead (Joshua Shene kick)	MISS 38-0
4	12:18	MISS	Brandon Bolden 24-yard run (Joshua Shene kick)	MISS 45-0

Ole Miss won the most lopsided Egg Bowl since the Rebels won 48–0 in 1971, by beating Mississippi State 45–0. Only once in this game did the Mississippi State offense cross the 50-yard line into Ole Miss territory. Ole Miss held MSU to just 37 total yards including minus 51 rushing yards. Ole Miss set a school record with 11 sacks. Mississippi Statewide receiver Brandon McRae was carted off the field after breaking his leg in the second quarter.

=== Cotton Bowl Classic ===
	1	2	3	4	Total
#20 Ole Miss	7	17	14	9	47
#8 Texas Tech	14	7	0	13	34

The #20 Rebels defeated the #8 Texas Tech Red Raiders 47–34 in the 2009 AT&T Cotton Bowl Classic in Dallas, Texas on January 2, 2009. The Red Raiders and the Rebels had met in bowl games twice before—1986 Independence Bowl and 1998 Independence Bowl—with Ole Miss winning both. The teams also met during the 2002 and 2003 regular seasons with Texas Tech winning both games of the home-and-home series.

The Rebels' last bowl bid came 5 years ago and ironically in the Cotton Bowl Classic, a 31–28 victory over Oklahoma State. In this Cotton Bowl Classic, Ole Miss made its fourth appearance in the Cotton Bowl Classic, now carrying a 3–1 record. The Rebels defeated Texas Christian University 14–13 in the 1956 game and dropped a 12–7 decision to Texas in 1962.

== Personnel ==
2008 Ole Miss Rebels football team roster
Players
Coaches
Offense

Pos.	#	Name	Class
QB		Jevan Snead
OT	74	Michael Oher	Sr

Defense

Pos.	#	Name	Class

Special teams

Pos.	#	Name	Class

Head coach

- Houston Nutt

Coordinators/assistant coaches

Legend

- (C) Team captain
- (S) Suspended
- (I) Ineligible
- Injured
- Redshirt

=== Coaching staff ===
Name	Responsibility	Position Group	Year	Alma mater
Houston Nutt	Head coach		1st	Oklahoma State University (1981)
Kent Austin	Offensive coordinator	Quarterbacks	1st	University of Mississippi (Ole Miss) (1986)
Tyrone Nix	Defensive coordinator	Linebackers	1st	University of Southern Mississippi (1995)
Kim Dameron		Safeties	1st	University of Arkansas (1983)
Ron Dickerson Jr.		Wide Receivers	1st	University of Arkansas (1996)
Mike Markuson	Running Game Coordinator	Offensive line	1st	Hamline University (1983)
Derrick Nix		Running Backs	1st	University of Southern Mississippi (2002)
Tracy Rocker		Defensive line	1st	Auburn University (1992)
James Shibest	Special teams coordinator	Tight Ends	1st	University of Arkansas (1988)
Chris Vaughn	Recruiting coordinator	Cornerbacks	1st	Murray State University (1998)
Andy Commer	Coordinator of Video Services		1st	Arkansas State University (1987)
Mike Beaumont	Assistant Athletics Director for Football Operations		1st	Arkansas State University (1992)
Don Decker	Head Football Strength Coach		1st	Evangel College (1988)
Tim Mullins	Head Athletic Trainer		11th	University of Mississippi (Ole Miss) (1991)
Clifton Ealy	Assistant Athletics Director for Community Relations		1st	University of Central Arkansas (1982)
Danny Nutt	Assistant Athletics Director for Player Development		1st	University of Arkansas (1985)
Ken Crain	Head Equipment Manager		10th	University of Mississippi (Ole Miss) (1996)
Alan Hensell	Graduate Assistant		2nd	Franklin College (Indiana) (2005)

== Statistics ==
=== Team ===
	Team	Opp
Scoring	417	247
Points per game	32.1	19.0
First downs	256	222
Rushing	122	86
Passing	124	117
Penalty	10	19
Total offense	5299	3994
Avg per play	6.2	4.7
Avg per game	407.6	307.2
Fumbles-Lost	20–10	21–7
Penalties-Yards	66–624	79–596
Avg per game	48.0	45.8

	Team	Opp
Punts-Yards	54-2099	78-3056
Avg per punt	38.9	39.2
Time of possession/Game	30:14	29:37
3rd down conversions	75/173	60/187
4th down conversions	9/14	12/22
Touchdowns scored	52	30
Field goals-Attempts-Long	17–21–47	13–16–52
PAT-Attempts	52–52	28–29
Attendance	371,036	381,047
Games/Avg per Game	53,005	76,209

==== Scores by quarter ====
	1	2	3	4	Total
Ole Miss	113	133	80	91	417
Opponents	59	81	27	80	247

=== Offense ===
==== Rushing ====
Name	GP-GS	Att	Gain	Loss	Net	Avg	TD	Long	Avg/G
McCluster, D.	13	109	697	42	655	6.0	6	40	50.4
Eason, Cordera	13	140	660	13	647	4.6	3	28	49.8
Bolden, Brandon	13	98	565	23	542	5.5	5	44	41.7
Davis, Enrique	10	64	258	14	244	3.8	3	62	24.4
Davis, Derrick	13	21	98	0	98	4.7	0	14	7.5
Wallace, Mike	13	10	97	5	92	9.2	0	18	7.1
Snead, Jevan	13	57	187	127	60	1.1	3	17	4.6
Thomas, Devin	5	5	34	0	34	6.8	0	19	6.8
Tapp, Billy	4	3	21	2	19	6.3	0	21	4.8
Summers, M.	13	2	19	0	19	9.5	1	13	1.5
Breaux, Lionel	13	3	21	5	16	5.3	0	15	1.2
Hartmann, Andy	12	1	10	0	10	10.0	0	10	0.8
Cook, Jason	13	1	1	0	1	1.0	0	1	0.1
Team	4	6	0	13	−13	−2.2	0	0	−3.3
TEAM									
Total	13	520	2668	244	2424	4.7	21	62	186.5
Opponents	13	411	1593	481	1112	2.7	9	44	85.5

==== Passing ====
Name	GP-GS	Effic	Att-Cmp-Int	Pct	Yds	TD	Lng	Avg/G
Snead, Jevan	3	145.77	43–77–3	55.8	660	6	64	220.0
McCluster, D.	3	−100.00	0–2–1	0.0	0	0	0	0.0
Tapp, Billy	2	150.40	1–1–0	100.0	6	0	6	3.0
Bolden, Brandon	3	410.80	1–1–0	100.0	37	0	37	12.3
Total	3	143.03	45–81–4	55.6	703	6	64	234.3
Opponents	3	121.70	72–112–2	64.3	656	4	43	218.7

==== Receiving ====
Name	GP-GS	No.	Yds	Avg	TD	Long	Avg/G
Rodriguez, Jonathan	3	10	163	16.3	1	31	54.3
Hodge, Shay	3	8	176	22.0	3	64	58.7
Wallace, Mike	3	8	151	18.9	0	42	50.3
Cook, Jason	3	4	30	7.5	0	16	10.0
Eason, Cordera	3	4	26	6.5	1	14	8.7
Breaux, Lionel	3	3	40	13.3	0	29	13.3
Bolden, Brandon	3	2	43	21.5	0	33	14.3
Harris, Gerald	3	2	20	10.0	1	16	6.7
Hartmann, Andy	3	2	11	5.5	0	8	3.7
Snead, Jevan	3	1	37	37.0	0	37	12.3
Harris, Andrew	3	1	6	6.0	0	6	2.0
Total	3	45	703	15.6	6	64	234.3
Opponents	3	72	656	9.1	4	43	218.7

=== Defense ===
Name Patrick Trahan	GP 14	Tackles 141				Sacks	Pass Defense		Interceptions 7				Fumbles 2		Blkd Kick
Name Patrick Trahan	GP 14	Solo	Ast	Total	TFL-Yds	No-Yds	BrUp	QBH	No.-Yds	Avg	TD	Long	Rcv-Yds	FF	Blkd Kick
Total															

=== Special teams ===
Name	Punting								Kickoffs				
Name	No.	Yds	Avg	Long	TB	FC	I20	Blkd	No.	Yds	Avg	TB	OB
Total													

Name	Punt returns					Kick returns				
Name	No.	Yds	Avg	TD	Long	No.	Yds	Avg	TD	Long
Total										

== NFL prospects ==
Nine Ole Miss players who ended their career at Ole Miss this year were either taken in the 2009 NFL draft or signed contracts with NFL teams. Michael Oher and Peria Jerry were first round draft picks at #23 and #24 respectively. Oher was drafted by the Baltimore Ravens while Jerry was drafted by the Atlanta Falcons. Mike Wallace was the 84th pick going to the Pittsburgh Steelers in the third round. Jamarca Sanford was the 231st pick going to the Minnesota Vikings in the seventh round. Additionally, Maurice Miller signed a free agent deal with the Tampa Bay Buccaneers, Jason Cook signed a free agent deal with the Baltimore Ravens, the late Tony Fein signed a free agent deal with the Seattle Seahawks and later was signed by the Baltimore Ravens and later cut, Ashlee Palmer signed a free agent deal with the Buffalo Bills and Jermey Parnell signed a free agent deal with the New Orleans Saints. Fein was found dead on October 7, 2009.
