= 2009 Cotton Bowl Classic =

2009 AT&T Cotton Bowl Classic
- 73rd Cotton Bowl Classic
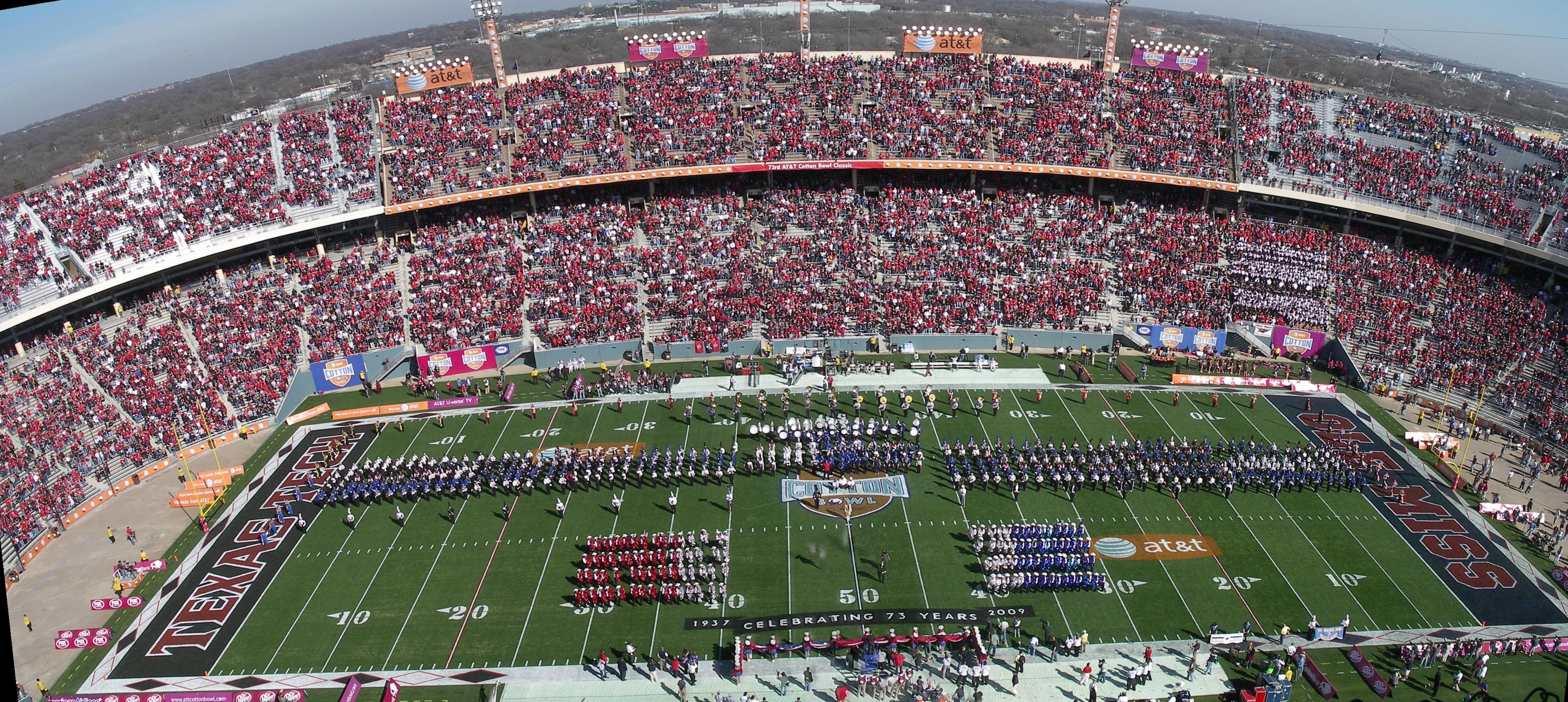
- Pregame festivities for the 2009 Cotton Bowl
Ole Miss Rebels	Texas Tech Red Raiders
(8–4)	(11–1)
SEC	Big 12
47	34
Head coach: Houston Nutt	Head coach: Mike Leach
AP / Coaches / BCS; 20 / 24 / 25	AP / Coaches / BCS; 8 / 8 / 7
	1	2	3	4	Total
Ole Miss	7	17	14	9	47
Texas Tech	14	7	0	13	34
- Date: January 2, 2009
- Season: 2008
- Stadium: Cotton Bowl
- Location: Dallas, Texas
- MVP: WR Dexter McCluster (Ole Miss); WR Marshay Green (Ole Miss)
- Favorite: Texas Tech by 4½
- Referee: Jay Stricherz (Pac-10)
- Attendance: 88,175
- Payout: US$3,000,000 per team

United States TV coverage
- Network: FOX
- Announcers: Pat Summerall play-by-play Brian Baldinger color Krista Voda sideline Jeanne Zelasko pre-game/halftime Shepard Smithhalftime
- Nielsen ratings: 4.4

The 2009 AT&T Cotton Bowl Classic was the 73rd edition of the annual college football bowl game that was part of the 2008 NCAA Division I FBS football season and was one of 34 games in the 2008–09 bowl season. The game featured the Ole Miss Rebels of the Southeastern Conference and the Texas Tech Red Raiders of the Big 12 Conference. Ole Miss won the game 47–34, in what turned out to be the highest scoring game in front of the largest Cotton Bowl Classic crowd in history.

The game was played on January 2, 2009, at the self-named stadium in Dallas, Texas, and was televised in the United States on FOX. This was the final Cotton Bowl Classic to be played at the stadium in the home of the State Fair of Texas, Fair Park. Since 2010, the game has been played at AT&T Stadium in nearby Arlington.

== Game summary ==
=== First half ===
Texas Tech was able to convert a pair of early turnovers into an early lead. The Raiders had the first two scores (both touchdowns) of the game with a 35-yard pass from Graham Harrell at the 6:31 mark of the first quarter and a Darcel McBath 45 yard interception return at the 5:22 mark of the first quarter to start the game with a 14-0 lead over the Ole Miss Rebels.

However, Ole Miss quarterback Jevan Snead was able to lead the Rebels to touchdowns on their next three drives, and a late field goal by Joshua Shene put the Rebels up 24-21 going into halftime.

=== Second half ===
The second half began with a Marshay Green 65-yard interception return for the Rebels which gave them a 10-point lead, 31-21. Ole Miss would remain in the lead over Texas Tech for the rest of the game, ending with a final score of 47-34.

By the end of the game, fans were chanting "S-E-C! S-E-C!" in reference to the Southeastern Conference, which Ole Miss is a part of, and the perceived rivalry with the Big 12 Conference, with which Texas Tech is a part of. This had another meaning, as it foreshadowed the next week in the 2009 BCS National Championship Game, which pitted the Florida Gators, also of the SEC, against the Oklahoma Sooners, also of the Big 12.

== Records ==
The game was the highest scoring game in Cotton Bowl history, until the Baylor-Michigan State game on January 1, 2015.

After the game, the Rebels are 20-12 all-time in bowl games, with this being their fourth Cotton Bowl appearance. In their last appearance, they beat Oklahoma State by three points in the 2004 Cotton Bowl.

After the game, Texas Tech is now 10-21-1 all-time in bowl games. Ole Miss had 223 yards of rushing offense compared to 105 for Texas Tech.

=== Graham Harrell record ===
In the game, Graham Harrell broke the record for more touchdown passes thrown than anyone in major-college history. Harrell first tied, then broke, the record with two scoring passes. The record-setting 132nd touchdown pass was a two-yard slant to Michael Crabtree early in the second quarter. (Colt Brennan had previously held the record with Hawaii, having 131 from 2005 to 2007.) Harrell passed for 364 yards, which is a Cotton Bowl record, and finished his collegiate career with 15,793 yards passing and 134 TDs.

== Scoring summary ==
Quarter	Time	Drive		Team	Scoring Information	Score	
Quarter	Time	Length	Time	Team	Scoring Information	Ole Miss	Texas Tech
1	6:31	4 plays, 61 yards	1:30	Texas Tech	Edward Britton 35–yard reception from Graham Harrell, Matt Williams kick good	0	7
1	5:22	0 plays, 0 yards	0:00	Texas Tech	Darcel McBath 45–yard interception return, Matt Williams kick good	0	14
1	1:49	8 plays, 78 yards	3:33	Ole Miss	Gerald Harris 8–yard reception from Jevan Snead, Joshua Shene kick good	7	14
2	11:57	10 plays, 85 yards	3:34	Ole Miss	Mike Wallace 41–yard reception from Jevan Snead, Joshua Shene kick good	14	14
2	7:44	11 plays, 75 yards	4:13	Texas Tech	Michael Crabtree 2–yard reception from Graham Harrell, Matt Williams kick good	14	21
2	4:09	9 plays, 80 yards	3:35	Ole Miss	Gerald Harris 21–yard reception from Jevan Snead, Joshua Shene kick good	21	21
2	1:08	6 plays, 35 yards	1:46	Ole Miss	Joshua Shene 27–yard field goal	24	21
3	12:12	0 plays, 0 yards	0:00	Ole Miss	Marshay Green 65–yard interception return, Joshua Shene kick good	31	21
3	6:55	3 plays, 40 yards	1:08	Ole Miss	Brandon Bolden 17–yard run, Joshua Shene kick good	38	21
4	12:13	9 plays, 83 yards	3:31	Texas Tech	Edward Britton 12–yard reception from Graham Harrell, Matt Williams kick good	38	28
4	10:02	0 plays, 0 yards	0:00	Ole Miss	Patrick Trahan safety (Graham Harrell fumbled out of the end zone)	40	28
4	4:34	9 plays, 48 yards	5:28	Ole Miss	Dexter McCluster 4–yard run, Joshua Shene kick good	47	28
4	1:37	7 plays, 62 yards	2:57	Texas Tech	Eric Morris 17–yard reception from Graham Harrell, Graham Harrell fumble-attempt failed	47	34
Final Score						47	34
