= Bo Wallace =

American football player and coach (born 1992)

Current position
- Title: Offensive coordinator
- Team: University School of Jackson (TN)

Biographical details
- Born: June 23, 1992 (age 34); Pulaski, Tennessee, U.S.
- Education: Giles County (Pulaski, Tennessee)

Playing career
- 2010: Arkansas State
- 2011: East Mississippi
- 2012–2014: Ole Miss
- Position: Quarterback

Coaching career (HC unless noted)
- 2015: Episcopal School of Dallas (TX) (assistant)
- 2016: Marshall County HS (TN) (QB)
- 2017: East Mississippi (QB)
- 2018: Giles County HS (TN) (OC)
- 2019: Fayette-Ware HS (TN) (AHC/OC)
- 2020: Coahoma (OC/QB)
- 2021: Pearl River (co-OC/QB)
- 2022: Holmes (QB)
- 2023–present: University School of Jackson (TN) (OC)

William Robert Wallace, Jr. (born June 23, 1992) is an American football coach and former player. He played college football at Ole Miss and was the Rebels' starting quarterback from 2012 to 2014.

== College career ==
Wallace attended Arkansas State University in 2010 under head coach Steve Roberts. He was redshirted for his first year. In 2011, he transferred to East Mississippi Community College, where he passed for 4,604 yards and 53 touchdowns, setting NJCAA records for passing touchdowns and total offense. In 2012, he transferred to the University of Mississippi to play under head coach Hugh Freeze. On August 30, he was named the Rebels starting quarterback. On November 27, he was awarded the Conerly Trophy, which is given to the best college football player in the state of Mississippi. On January 5, 2013, he was named the BBVA Compass Bowl MVP. On December 30, 2013, he was named the Music City Bowl MVP.

=== Statistics ===
| | | Passing | | | | | | | Rushing | | |
| Season | GP | Comp | Att | Comp % | Yds | TD | INT | RAT | Att | Yds | TD |
| 2012 | 13 | 235 | 368 | 63.9 | 2,994 | 22 | 17 | 142.7 | 143 | 390 | 8 |
| 2013 | 13 | 283 | 437 | 64.8 | 3,346 | 18 | 10 | 138.1 | 131 | 355 | 6 |
| 2014 | 13 | 229 | 381 | 60.1 | 3,194 | 22 | 14 | 142.2 | 121 | 199 | 5 |
| Total | 39 | 747 | 1,186 | 63.0 | 9,534 | 62 | 41 | 140.8 | 395 | 944 | 19 |

== Professional career ==
Pre-draft measurables
| Height | Weight | Arm length | Hand span | 40-yard dash | 10-yard split | 20-yard split | Broad jump |
|---|---|---|---|---|---|---|---|
| 6 ft 3 5/8 in (1.92 m) | 211 lb (96 kg) | 32 1/8 in (0.82 m) | 9 3/8 in (0.24 m) | 5.09 s | 1.77 s | 2.89 s | 8 ft 8 in (2.64 m) |
All values from Ole Miss Pro Day

Wallace went undrafted in the 2015 NFL draft. Wallace was invited to the Kansas City Chiefs rookie minicamp on a tryout basis. He was not signed to a contract at the conclusion of the rookie minicamp.

== Coaching career ==
In February 2016, Marshall County, out of Tennessee, announced that Wallace would be the quarterback coach at Marshall County High School, where his younger brother was the high school quarterback.

In January 2017, East Mississippi Community College announced that Wallace was hired to be the team's quarterback coach. Wallace won a national championship at EMCC in 2011 and won NJCAA player of the year.

On December 9, 2020, Pearl River Community College announced that Wallace had been hired as the co-offensive coordinator and quarterbacks coach.

On November 16, 2021, Holmes Community College announced that Wallace had been hired as the quarterbacks coach.

In April 2023, Wallace was named offensive coordinator and admissions assistant for the Bruins of the University School of Jackson.
