= 2013 BBVA Compass Bowl =

Pittsburgh Panthers	Ole Miss Rebels
(6–6)	(6–6)
Big East	SEC
17	38
Head coach: Paul Chryst	Head coach: Hugh Freeze
	1	2	3	4	Total
Pittsburgh	0	10	0	7	17
Ole Miss	14	10	7	7	38
- Date: January 5, 2013
- Season: 2012
- Stadium: Legion Field
- Location: Birmingham, Alabama
- Favorite: Ole Miss by 3½
- Referee: Reggie Smith (Big 12)
- Attendance: 59,135 (BBVA Compass Bowl Record)
- Payout: US$1 million (SEC); $900,000 (Big East)

United States TV coverage
- Network: ESPN
- Announcers: Eamon McAnaney (play-by-play), David Diaz-Infante (analyst) and Paul Carcaterra (sideline reporter)

The 2013 BBVA Compass Bowl, the seventh edition of the game, was a post-season American college football bowl game, held on January 5, 2013, at Legion Field in Birmingham, Alabama as part of the 2012–13 NCAA Bowl season. The game, which was telecasted at 12:00 p.m. CT on ESPN, featured the University of Pittsburgh Panthers of the Big East Conference versus the University of Mississippi Rebels of the Southeastern Conference. This was Pittsburgh's third consecutive appearance in the game, as well as its final game as a member of the Big East before they join the Atlantic Coast Conference in 2013. The announced attendance for the game was a BBVA Compass Bowl record 59,135, eclipsing the previous attendance record of 42,610 in the 2010 edition. The University of Mississippi defeated the University of Pittsburgh 38–17.

== Game summary ==
Scoring summary

Quarter	Time	Drive			Team	Scoring information	Score	
Quarter	Time	Plays	Yards	TOP	Team	Scoring information	PITT	MISS
1	10:18	5	23	2:12	MISS	Ja-Mes Logan 14-yard touchdown reception from Bo Wallace, Bryson Rose kick good	0	7
1	5:22	10	72	3:57	MISS	Randall Mackey 27-yard touchdown reception from Bo Wallace, Bryson Rose kick good	0	14
2	7:13	6	25	3:02	PITT	Devin Street 10-yard touchdown reception from Tino Sunseri, Kevin Harper kick good	7	14
2	6:02	5	48	1:11	MISS	Vince Sanders 18-yard touchdown reception from Bo Wallace, Bryson Rose kick good	7	21
2	1:58	9	45	4:04	PITT	47-yard field goal by Kevin Harper	10	21
2	0:00	10	50	1:58	MISS	31-yard field goal by Bryson Rose	10	24
3	0:21	10	48	3:43	MISS	Barry Brunetti 1-yard touchdown run, Bryson Rose kick good	10	31
4	8:48	1	62	0:12	MISS	I'Tavius Mathers 62-yard touchdown run, Bryson Rose kick good	10	38
4	2:23	7	70	2:11	PITT	Mike Shanahan 16-yard touchdown reception from Tino Sunseri, Kevin Harper kick good	17	38
"TOP" = time of possession. For other American football terms, see Glossary of American football.							17	38

=== Statistics ===
Statistics	PITT	MISS
First downs	17	23
Total offense, plays – yards	68−266	86−387
Rushes-yards (net)	36–81	49–224
Passing yards (net)	185	163
Passes, Comp-Att-Int	16–32–1	24–37–2
Time of Possession	28:36	31:24
