= Jordan Watkins =

American football player (born 2002)

No. 17 – San Francisco 49ers
- Position: Wide receiver
- Roster status: Active

Personal information
- Born: February 15, 2002 (age 24); Louisville, Kentucky, U.S.
- Listed height: 5 ft 11 in (1.80 m)
- Listed weight: 196 lb (89 kg)

Career information
- High school: Butler Traditional (Louisville, Kentucky)
- College: Louisville (2020–2021); Ole Miss (2022–2024)
- NFL draft: 2025: 4th round, 138th overall pick

Career history
- San Francisco 49ers (2025–present)

Career NFL statistics as of Week 9, 2026
- Receptions: 12
- Receiving yards: 250
- Receiving touchdowns: 1
- Stats at Pro Football Reference

Tyrell Jordan Watkins (born February 15, 2002) is an American professional football wide receiver for the San Francisco 49ers of the National Football League (NFL). He played college football for the Louisville Cardinals and Ole Miss Rebels. Watkins was selected by the 49ers in the fourth round of the 2025 NFL draft.

== Early life ==
Watkins was born on February 15, 2002, and grew up in Louisville, Kentucky. He attended Butler Traditional High School in Louisville, where he played football as a wide receiver. Watkins recorded 34 receptions for 679 yards and seven touchdowns as a junior, and 37 receptions for 712 yards and seven touchdowns as a senior. Although he initially committed to play college football for the Kentucky Wildcats, Watkins, a three-star recruit, later changed his commitment to the Louisville Cardinals.

== College career ==
=== Louisville ===
Watkins saw limited playing time as a freshman at Louisville in 2020, recording eight receptions for 57 yards, as well as one carry for a 23-yard touchdown. He also recorded 11 kickoffs for 198 yards.

In 2021, Watkins placed second on the team with 35 receptions for 529 yards and four touchdowns after starting 11 games. That same year, he returned eight punts for 85 yards and a kickoff for 28 yards. Watkins entered the NCAA transfer portal following the season.

=== Ole Miss ===
Watkins ended up transferring to the Ole Miss Rebels for the 2022 season. In his first year there, Watkins started 10 games and recorded 40 receptions for 449 yards and two touchdowns.

In 2023, Watkins had 53 receptions for 741 yards and three touchdowns from 11 starts, earning honorable mention All-Southeastern Conference (SEC) honors from College Football Network. He also returned 12 punts for 114 yards, including an 70-yard touchdown return in the season-opener against Mercer. Watkins announced a return for a final season in 2024, rather than declaring for the 2024 NFL draft.

In 2024, Watkins started 12 games for the Rebels. During a Week 2 victory over Wake Forest, he scored a 75-yard touchdown on a pass from Jaxson Dart. On November 2 against the Arkansas Razorbacks, Watkins caught eight passes for 254 yards and five touchdowns, setting the Ole Miss single-game record for receiving touchdowns and receiving yards, even though he had never before had a multi-touchdown game. That week, he earned the Walter Camp National FBS Offensive Player of the Week award. At the 2024 TaxSlayer Gator Bowl, Watkins scored two touchdowns in the fourth quarter, one for 69 yards, to help the Rebels defeat the Duke Blue Devils 52–20 in his 180 reception yard game. Watkins finished the season with 49 receptions for 906 yards and nine touchdowns to go along with three carries for 20 yards.

== Professional career ==
Pre-draft measurables
Height	Weight	Arm length	Hand span	Wingspan	40-yard dash	10-yard split	20-yard split	Vertical jump	Broad jump
5 ft 11 1/4 in (1.81 m)	196 lb (89 kg)	29 3/8 in (0.75 m)	9 1/8 in (0.23 m)	6 ft 0 1/2 in (1.84 m)	4.37 s	1.53 s	2.56 s	36.5 in (0.93 m)	9 ft 11 in (3.02 m)
All values from NFL Combine

=== 2025 season ===
Watkins was drafted by the San Francisco 49ers in the fourth round (138th overall) of the 2025 NFL draft.

Watkins made his NFL debut during Week 8 against the Houston Texans and finished the 26–15 road loss with a seven-yard reception. In the next game against the New York Giants, Watkins recorded a 19-yard reception during the 34–24 road victory.

Watkins finished his rookie year with two receptions for 26 yards in four games and no starts.

=== 2026 season ===
After being a healthy scratch for the first two games of the season, Watkins made his season debut in Week 3 against the Arizona Cardinals. He finished the 36–30 victory with two receptions for 60 yards. During a Week 7 29–20 road loss to the Atlanta Falcons, Watkins had three receptions for 56 yards. Two weeks later against the Las Vegas Raiders, he was the leading receiver with four receptions for 86 yards and his first NFL touchdown.

== NFL career statistics ==
=== Regular season ===
Year	Team	Games		Receiving					Rushing					Fumbles	
Year	Team	GP	GS	Rec	Yds	Avg	Lng	TD	Att	Yds	Avg	Lng	TD	Fum	Lost
2025	SF	4	0	2	26	12.5	19	0	0	0	0.0	0	0	0	0
2026	SF	6	4	10	224	22.4	37T	1	0	0	0.0	0	0	0	0
Career		10	4	12	250	12.2	37T	1	0	0	0.0	0	0	0	0

== Personal life ==
Watkins has a daughter who was born in October 2024.
