= Jevan Snead =

American football player (1987–2019)

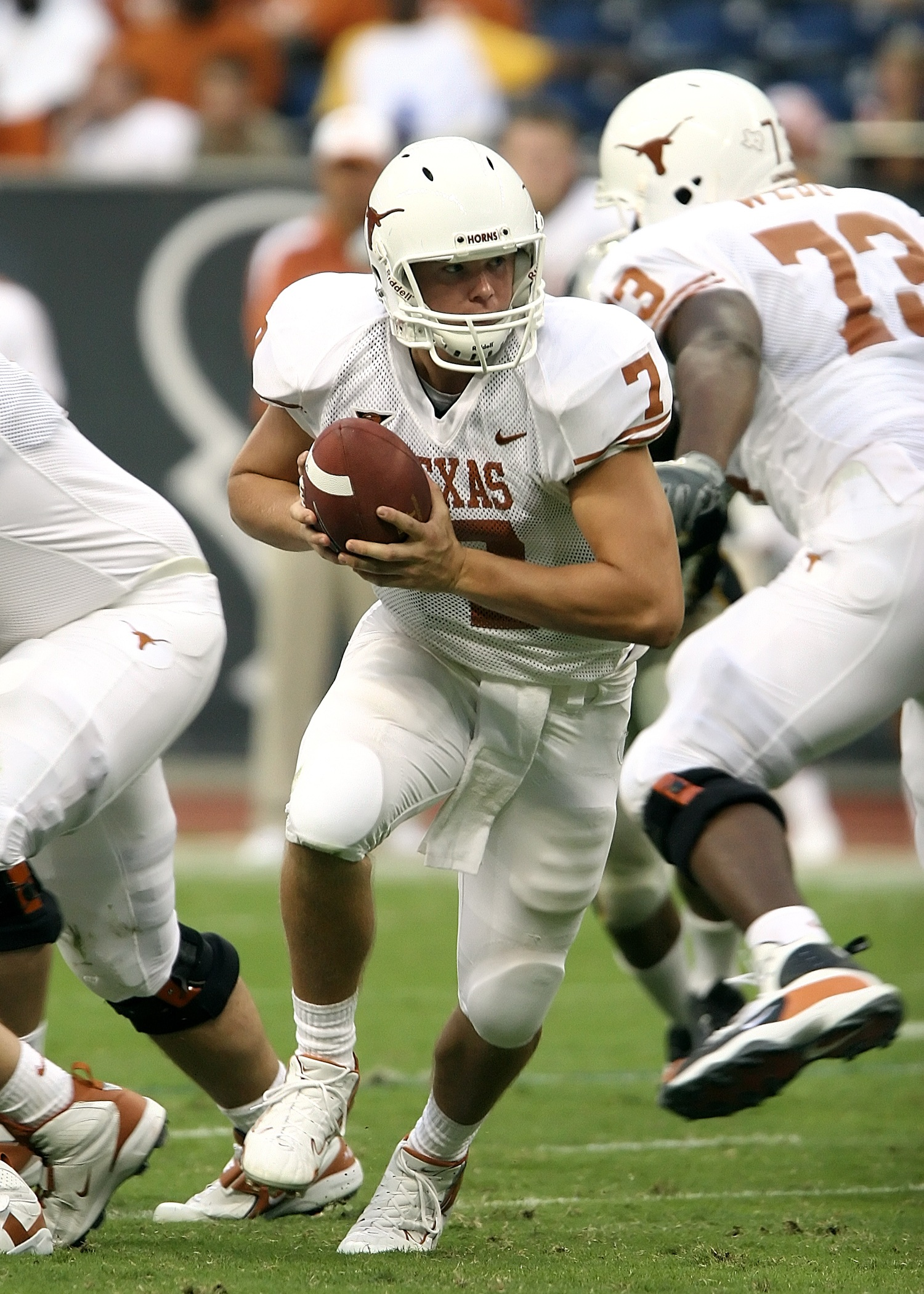
- Snead with the Texas Longhorns in 2006

No. 7, 4
- Position: Quarterback

Personal information
- Born: September 2, 1987; San Angelo, Texas, U.S.
- Died: September 21, 2019 (aged 32); Austin, Texas, U.S.
- Listed height: 6 ft 3 in (1.91 m)
- Listed weight: 219 lb (99 kg)

Career information
- High school: Stephenville (Stephenville, Texas)
- College: Texas (2006); Ole Miss (2007–2009)
- NFL draft: 2010: undrafted

Career history
- Tampa Bay Buccaneers (2010)*; Tampa Bay Storm (2011)*
- * Offseason or practice squad member only

Jevan Bryce Snead (September 2, 1987 – September 21, 2019) was an American football quarterback. He played college football at Ole Miss after Colt McCoy won the starting quarterback position over him for the Texas Longhorns football team. He was signed by the Tampa Bay Buccaneers as an undrafted free agent but was cut from the team and was later a preseason member of the Tampa Bay Storm.

== Early life ==
Snead was a prep All-American, two-time all-state and two-time all-district performer for Stephenville High School, who finished his high school career with a 23-2 (.920) record as a starter. As a senior, he was named to the 2006 Parade All-America team. He was also listed as a second-team All-American by EA Sports and he earned an invitation to the Elite 11 Quarterback Camp. Snead was selected for the 2006 U.S. Army All-American Bowl and finished the game with the second-most passing yards in the history of that game, as he threw for 147 yards and two touchdowns.

Snead originally committed to Florida but decided to go to Texas to be closer to home. Top high school recruit Tim Tebow later committed to Florida. Snead revised his decision immediately after a recruiting trip to Texas where he watched the 2005 Texas Longhorns football team beat Kansas by a score of 66–14.

Snead's last high school game was a 41–38 loss in the Texas 4A Division 1 State semi-finals against Dallas Highland Park. That team was led by former Georgia Bulldogs and current LA Rams quarterback, Matthew Stafford.

He was inducted into the Stephenville High School Hall of Fame on September 26, 2014.

== College career ==
=== Texas Longhorns ===
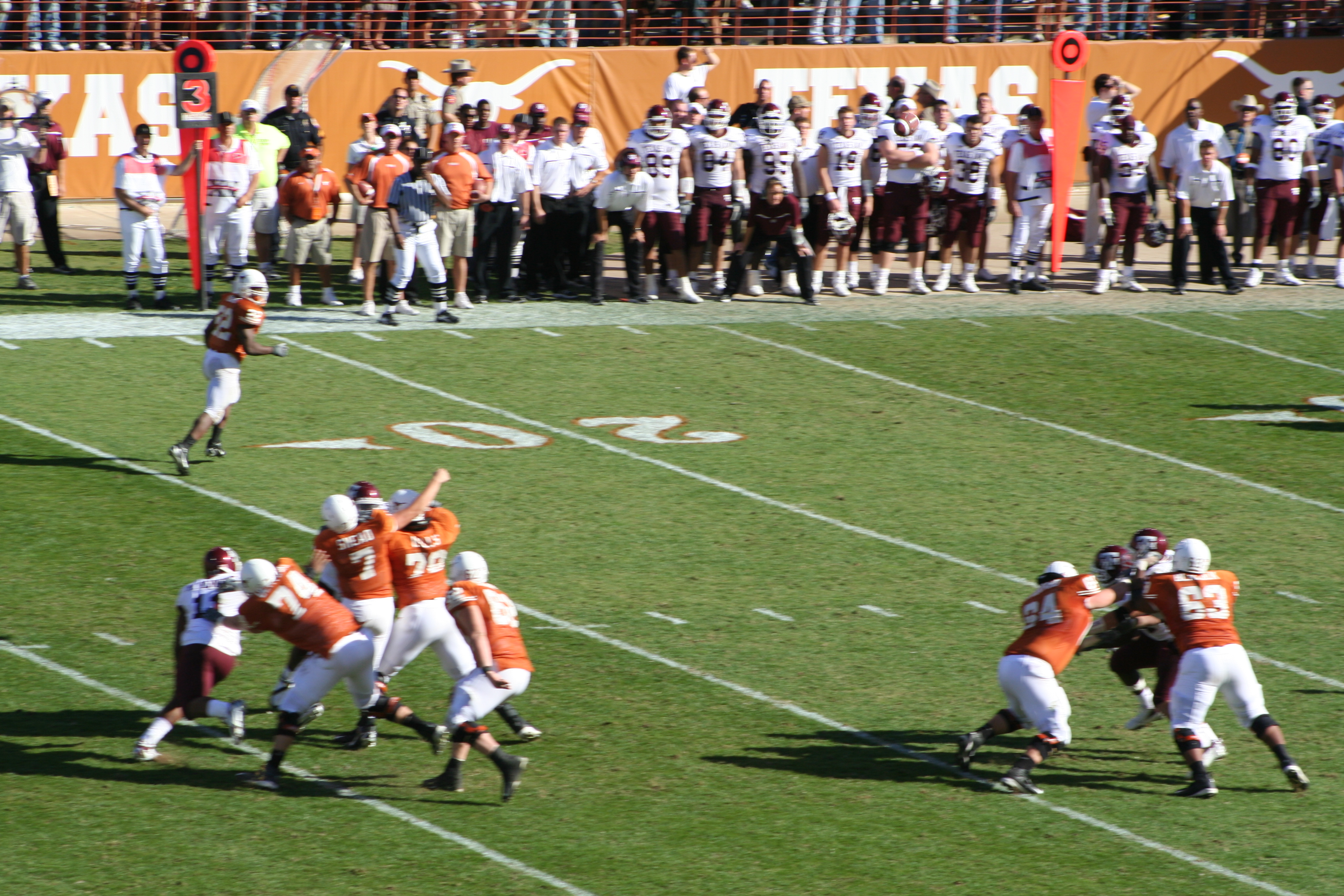
Jevan Snead throws an interception vs Texas A&M

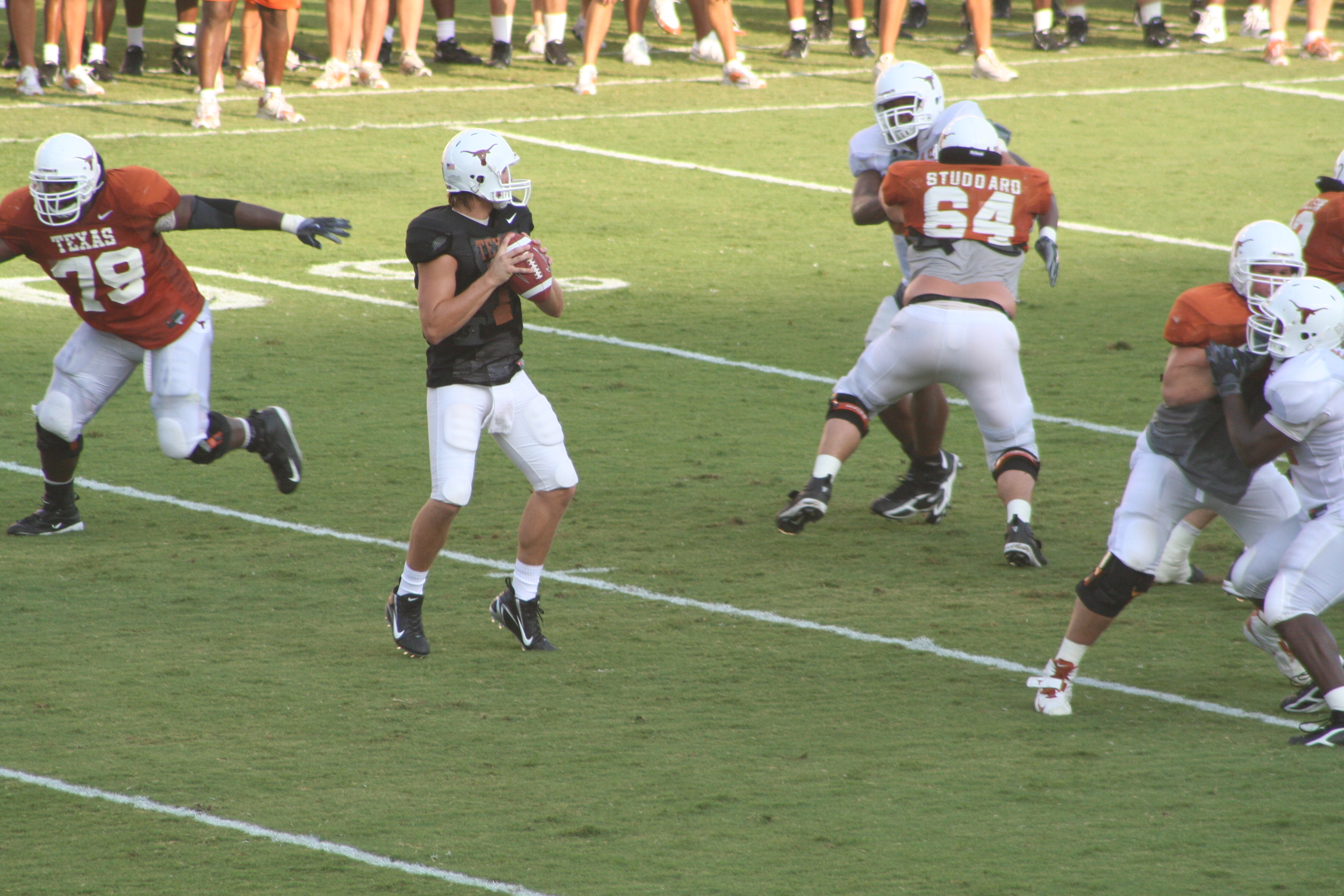
Snead during an intrasquad scrimmage in 2006

Following the 2005 season Vince Young declared for the NFL draft, leaving the University of Texas at Austin. The Texas Longhorns' quarterback position became an open competition between true freshman Snead and redshirt freshman Colt McCoy. McCoy eventually narrowly beat out Snead for the starting job and thrived in the position, relegating Snead to limited playing time as the backup.

During the November 11, 2006, game against the Kansas State Wildcats, McCoy suffered a stinger shoulder injury while rushing for a touchdown on the very first drive of the game. Snead came into the game in relief. Snead was sacked five times during the game, rushing 12 times for minus 2 yards, which combined with two fumbles by running backs led to the Longhorns trailing by as much as 21 points in the second half. Still, Snead brought them within 3 points of tying the game. However, the Longhorns failed to recover an onside kick and Texas lost in an upset to the Wildcats 45–42. The game had the distinction of being the most points ever scored by a Texas team in a losing effort. Texas defensive coordinator Gene Chizik said "The quarterback had a great night and we just didn't play great sudden-change defense". Head coach Mack Brown also had praise for Snead's performance coming off the bench, adding "If he plays in the game in two weeks, he'll be much more ready."

There was speculation that Snead might be the starter for the final regular season game because it was unknown whether McCoy would return for the Longhorns season closer against arch-rival Texas A&M on November 24, 2006. The Tuesday prior to the Thursday game, Longhorns announced that McCoy was cleared to play the game against the Aggies. McCoy played almost the entire game only to be injured with 20 seconds remaining by a late hit from Aggie defensive end Michael Bennett. Snead, attempting to come from behind 12–7 with so little time on the clock, threw an interception to end the game.

=== Ole Miss Rebels ===
In January 2007, Snead enrolled at the University of Mississippi to play for the Ole Miss Rebels under then-head coach Ed Orgeron. Due to NCAA transfer rules, Snead had to sit out the 2007 season, but then had three years of eligibility remaining, beginning with the 2008 season. In the Rebels' 2008 spring game, Snead made 20 of 26 passes for 269 yards and two touchdowns. Head coach Houston Nutt stated to the press that he was "thankful that [Snead] is here on campus". Nutt looked to Snead to become the starter for the 2008 team. Through the first twelve games as the starter for the Ole Miss Rebels, Jevan Snead passed for 2470 yards, 23 Touchdowns and 12 interceptions. More importantly the Rebels were 8-4 and bowl eligible for the 1st time since 2003. The #25-ranked Rebels upset #7 Texas Tech in the 2009 Cotton Bowl Classic 47–34, and Snead completed 18 of 29 passes for 292 yards, three touchdowns, and one interception in his first bowl start.

The Rebels began the 2009 season ranked 8 in the AP rankings. Just days after the Rebels defeated the Memphis Tigers in their first game of 2009, Snead was one of 22 football players who had contracted swine flu. It was not believed that the illness would prevent Snead from playing any games. The Rebels finished the 2009 season 4–4 in the SEC and 9-4 overall and defeated Oklahoma State 21–7 in the 2010 Cotton Bowl, in which Snead suffered a helmet-to-helmet hit early in the second quarter and did not return until the fourth quarter. He finished 13-of-23 for 168 yards with three interceptions.

Snead ended his 2009 season by passing for 2,632 yards, with 20 touchdowns and 20 interceptions. After the season, he declared for the 2010 NFL draft.

Snead's 2008 and 2009 seasons rank sixth and eighth, respectively, in Ole Miss's career ranking of single-season passing yards, while his career total of 5,394 ranks sixth all-time.

== Professional career ==
=== Pre-draft ===
Pre-draft measurables
Height	Weight	Arm length	Hand span	40-yard dash	10-yard split	20-yard split	20-yard shuttle	Three-cone drill	Vertical jump	Broad jump
6 ft 3 in (1.91 m)	219 lb (99 kg)	32 1/4 in (0.82 m)	10 in (0.25 m)	5.04 s	1.70 s	2.91 s	4.33 s	7.08 s	33.0 in (0.84 m)	8 ft 10 in (2.69 m)
All values from NFL Combine

Entering his junior season at Ole Miss, Snead was considered a top-2 quarterback prospect (along with Sam Bradford) in the 2010 NFL draft, according to his former high school coach Chad Morris. In April 2009, CBSSports.com's Pete Prisco even projected Snead to be the first overall pick in 2010. After his junior season, which saw him throw 20 touchdowns and 20 interceptions, Snead requested a draft evaluation from the NFL Draft Advisory Board, and he received a fourth-round draft grade. However, he went undrafted.

=== Tampa Bay Buccaneers ===
After going undrafted, Snead signed with the Tampa Bay Buccaneers on April 24, 2010. He was released on July 31, 2010, to make room on the 80-man training camp roster for newly signed first round draft pick Gerald McCoy. On August 24, 2010, Snead re-signed with Tampa Bay, after starting quarterback Josh Freeman suffered a thumb injury that sidelined him for the rest of the preseason. Snead was to backup Josh Johnson and Rudy Carpenter before the Buccaneers again cut Snead on September 4, 2010.

=== Tampa Bay Storm ===
On January 4, 2011, Snead signed a contract to play for the Tampa Bay Storm of the Arena Football League. He was released prior to the start of the season on March 6.

== After football ==
According to his former high school football coach, as of January 2015, Snead worked as an oil field supplies salesman in San Antonio, Texas. For the six months prior to his death, he worked as a managing consultant for WeWork Space Services in Austin.

== Death ==
Snead died by suicide on September 21, 2019, in Austin, Texas, at the age of 32. Snead had suffered dementia-like symptoms after his football career, unable to remember games he played at Ole Miss and even parts of his childhood. This led him and his family to conclude that he was experiencing symptoms of chronic traumatic encephalopathy (CTE) caused by concussions suffered during his years of playing football. After his death and pursuant to his wishes, Snead's brain was donated to an institute that studies CTE.
