= Giles County High School =

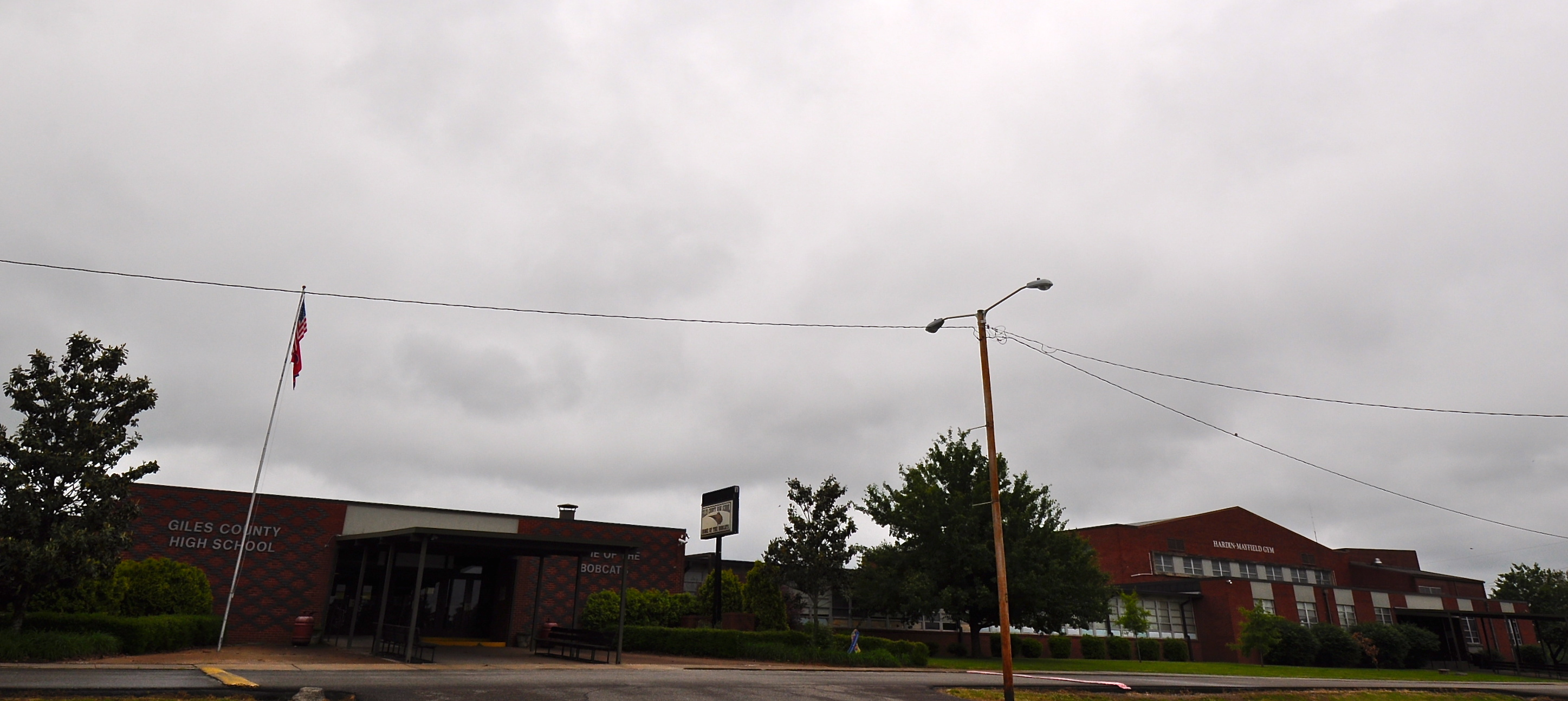
- Giles County High School, May 2014.

Location
- 200 Sheila Frost Drive; Pulaski, Tennessee 38478; United States
- Coordinates: 35.190294°N 87.027125°W

Information
- Type: Public
- School board: Giles County Board of Education
- School district: Giles County School District
- Principal: Don Thomas
- Staff: 58.33 (FTE)
- Grades: 9-12
- Enrollment: 688 (2023-2024)
- Student to teacher ratio: 11.79
- Colours: Black; Gold
- Athletics conference: TSSAA
- Team name: Bobcats
- Rival: Lawrence County High School
- Website: GCHS website

Giles County High School is a public high school in Pulaski, Tennessee.

State scores are slightly below average. English 1-4 is offered with Honors, and foreign language classes include Spanish. A journalism and video journalism class completes the language department. Giles County High's math options include Pre-Algebra, Algebra 1 and 2, Geometry, Pre-Calculus, Calculus, and College Algebra. The Science Department features Biology 1 and 2, Chemistry 1 and 2, Physics, Ecology, Anatomy, Physical and Life Sciences. The Social Studies department offers World History, World Geography, American Government, United States History, Economics, International Business, Marketing, and Physiology. The Arts include Art 1–4, Theater, Chorus, and The GCHS Band of Gold.
