= Kayo Dottley =

American football player (1928–2018)

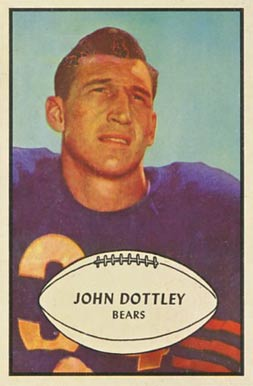
- Dottley on a 1953 Bowman football card

No. 34
- Position: Fullback

Personal information
- Born: August 25, 1928; Birmingham, Alabama, U.S.
- Died: November 17, 2018 (aged 90); Vicksburg, Mississippi, U.S.
- Listed height: 6 ft 1 in (1.85 m)
- Listed weight: 200 lb (91 kg)

Career information
- High school: McGehee (McGehee, Arkansas)
- College: Ole Miss (1947–1950)
- NFL draft: 1950: 2nd round, 24th overall pick

Career history
- Chicago Bears (1951–1953)

Awards and highlights
- Second-team All-Pro (1951); Pro Bowl (1951); Second-team All-American (1950); 2× First-team All-SEC (1949, 1950)

Career NFL statistics
- Rushing yards: 1,122
- Rushing average: 4.5
- Receptions: 28
- Receiving yards: 359
- Total touchdowns: 9
- Stats at Pro Football Reference

John Albert "Kayo" Dottley (August 25, 1928 – November 17, 2018) was an American professional football player who was a fullback for the Chicago Bears of the National Football League (NFL). He played college football for the Ole Miss Rebels.

== Biography ==
Dottley played high school football in McGehee, Arkansas. At Ole Miss, Dottley was the first running back in the school's history to record back-to-back 1,000-yard seasons in 1949–1950. He also holds the single season rushing record of 1312 yards in 1949.

In his autobiography, Hall of Famer Art Donovan paid Dottley this tribute: "They talk about Walter Payton making people pay for bringing him down, but Payton's nothing but a Fancy Dan compared to a halfback who used to play for the Bears named John Dottley, a tough big kid from Mississippi."

== NFL career statistics ==
Legend
**Bold**	Career high

Year	Team	Games		Rushing					Receiving				
Year	Team	GP	GS	Att	Yds	Avg	Lng	TD	Rec	Yds	Avg	Lng	TD
1951	CHI	12	9	**127**	**670**	**5.3**	38	**3**	**14**	**225**	**16.1**	**77**	**1**
1952	CHI	5	5	65	302	4.6	**44**	**3**	9	113	12.6	25	**1**
1953	CHI	10	5	58	150	2.6	12	1	5	21	4.2	8	0
Career		27	19	250	1,122	4.5	44	7	28	359	12.8	77	2

== Honors ==
- First-team All-America selection (1949)
- Pro Bowl selection (1951)
- Mississippi Sports Hall of Fame (1971)
- Ole Miss Sports Hall of Fame (1987)
- Ole Miss Team of the Century (1893–1992)

== See also ==
- List of college football yearly rushing leaders
