= Romaro Miller =

American football player (born 1978)

No. 11, 14, 16
- Position: Quarterback

Personal information
- Born: September 12, 1978 (age 48); Shannon, Mississippi, U.S.
- Listed height: 6 ft 1 in (1.85 m)
- Listed weight: 195 lb (88 kg)

Career information
- High school: Shannon
- College: Ole Miss
- NFL draft: 2001: undrafted

Career history
- Minnesota Vikings (2001); → Rhein Fire (2002); Ottawa Renegades (2003); Toronto Argonauts (2004)

Awards and highlights
- Grey Cup champion (2004)

Romaro Miller (born September 12, 1978) is an American former professional football player who was a quarterback in the National Football League (NFL) and Canadian Football League (CFL). He was a three-year starter playing college football for the Ole Miss Rebels.

== College career ==
Born in Shannon, Mississippi, Miller set many quarterback records while playing at the University of Mississippi. He was followed by Eli Manning, who would go on to have an outstanding career for the Rebels and break several of his recently set records. As an Ole Miss Rebel, Miller completed 497 passes on 902 tries. He had 6,311 passing yards and 43 touchdowns. He led Ole Miss to three straight bowl games winning the Independence Bowl twice and losing the Music City Bowl. His overall record at Ole Miss was 22–13.

== Professional career ==
Miller was signed by the Minnesota Vikings of the NFL on May 9, 2001. He was released by the Vikings on September 2 but later re-signed on December 18, 2001. He played for the Rhein Fire of NFL Europe during the 2002 NFL Europe season. He was released by the Vikings on August 26, 2002.

He then went to the CFL, where he played for the Ottawa Renegades, the Calgary Stampeders, and the Toronto Argonauts. As the Argonauts' third-string quarterback, he was a member of their 2004 team that won the 92nd Grey Cup.

Miller was the quarterbacks coach at Millsaps College following his NFL career.
