= Hugh Freeze =

American football coach (born 1969)

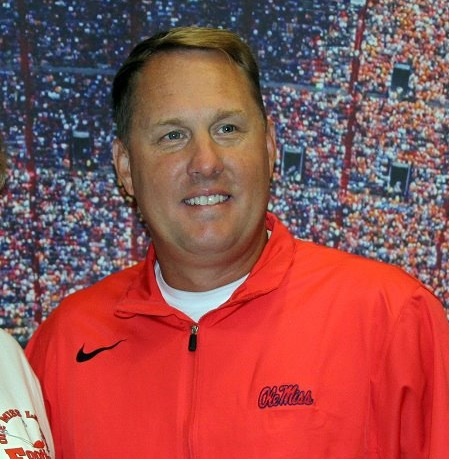
- Freeze with Ole Miss in 2012

Biographical details
- Born: September 27, 1969 (age 57); Oxford, Mississippi, U.S.

Playing career

Baseball
- 1989–1990: Northwest Mississippi CC
- Fall 1990: Southern Miss

Coaching career (HC unless noted)

Football
- 1992–1994: Briarcrest HS (TN) (OC/DB)
- 1995–2004: Briarcrest HS (TN)
- 2006–2007: Ole Miss (TE/RC)
- 2008–2009: Lambuth
- 2010: Arkansas State (OC)
- 2011: Arkansas State
- 2012–2016: Ole Miss
- 2019–2022: Liberty
- 2023–2025: Auburn

Administrative career (AD unless noted)
- 2005: Ole Miss (assistant AD)

Head coaching record
- Overall: 91–66 (Note: Does not include 27 wins vacated by the NCAA in 2019. Actual on-field record of 7–6 in 2012, 8–5 in 2013, 9–4 in 2014, and 5–7 in 2016.)
- Bowls: 5–3 (Note: The 2013 BBVA Compass Bowl victory was vacated by the NCAA in 2019.)
- Tournaments: 1–2 (NAIA playoffs)

Accomplishments and honors

Championships
- 1 Sun Belt (2011); 2 MSC West Division (2008–2009); 2 Tennessee HS 8-AA (2002, 2004); 6 Tennessee HS 8-AA Regional (1995–1998, 2001, 2002)

Awards
- Sun Belt Coach of the Year (2011); AFCA Southeast Region COY (2009); Mid-South Conference COY (2009); 4× AP HS COY; 5× Region 8-AA COY

Danny Hugh Freeze Jr. (born September 27, 1969) is an American college football coach. He most recently served as the head coach for Auburn University.

Freeze was a successful high school football coach at Briarcrest Christian School in Memphis, Tennessee, where he coached Michael Oher and Greg Hardy. He served as the head football coach at Lambuth University from 2008 to 2009, Arkansas State University in 2011, the University of Mississippi (Ole Miss) from 2012 to 2016, and Liberty University from 2018 to 2022. He served as Auburn's head coach from 2023 to 2025, when he was fired mid-season after compiling the worst three-year start for a head coach at the school in 70 years.

Under Freeze, the Ole Miss football program committed various recruiting and academic violations that figured in the NCAA's decision to expunge 27 of Freeze's wins and ban the team from post-season play for two years. After university officials attempted to paint Freeze's predecessor Houston Nutt as the main culprit, they were sued for defamation and they subsequently issued a public apology. The team's star quarterback and other players told NCAA officials that Freeze lied to them about the charges while he recruited them.

Freeze resigned from Ole Miss in 2017 after officials discovered that he had used a university cell phone to call escort services at least a dozen times over 33 months.

== Early life ==
Freeze was born in Oxford, Mississippi, and grew up on a dairy farm in Independence, Mississippi. His father, Danny Freeze, is a longtime high school assistant coach. Freeze graduated from Senatobia High School in 1988, then attended Northwest Mississippi Community College, where he lettered two years in junior college baseball. He became an NJCAA Academic All-American for the Rangers in the spring of 1990.

Freeze then attended the University of Southern Mississippi, where he tried out for the baseball team in the fall of 1990, hoping to make the roster for the spring of 1991. He was cut from the team. He graduated from Southern Miss in 1992 with a Bachelor of Science degree in mathematics and a minor in coaching and sports administration.

== Coaching career ==
=== Briarcrest Christian School ===
In 1992, Freeze joined the staff at Briarcrest Christian School in Memphis, Tennessee, as the football team's offensive coordinator and defensive backs coach. Freeze also served as dean of students. In 1995, he was promoted to head coach. Freeze ran the no-huddle spread offense and led his team to the state championship in 2002 and 2004, and the regional championship each year from 1995 to 1998 and in 2001 and 2002. He received Region 8-AA Coach of the Year honors five times and Associated Press Coach of the Year honors six times. Freeze went 94–30 as head coach (.785 winning percentage) and 126–37 overall. Freeze was depicted in the book and motion picture The Blind Side, about one of his former players, offensive tackle Michael Oher.

From 1992 to 2004, Freeze also coached the Briarcrest girls basketball team to an overall record of 305–63 (.829 winning percentage), seven straight championship appearances, and four championships.

In 2017, after Freeze was dismissed from Ole Miss, some former students alleged that Freeze had engaged in inappropriate conduct with female students while at Briarcrest. Freeze denied the allegations. Briarcrest officials said they were unaware of any sexual improprieties committed by Freeze during his tenure.

=== Ole Miss assistant coach ===
In 2005, the University of Mississippi hired Freeze as an assistant athletic director for football external affairs. The following season, he became the tight ends coach and recruiting coordinator, positions he held through 2007. After that season, he replaced head coach Ed Orgeron on an interim basis before the hiring of Houston Nutt. Freeze interviewed for the offensive coordinator position with Nutt, a position that eventually went to Kent Austin.

=== Lambuth ===
In January 2008, Lambuth University, a member of the National Association of Intercollegiate Athletics (NAIA), named Freeze its head coach. In 2008, he led Lambuth to an 8–4 record and a first round loss in the NAIA playoffs, marking their first appearance in the playoffs since 2004 under then head coach Vic Wallace. He was considered for the University of Tennessee at Chattanooga's head coaching position following the 2008 season, but remained at Lambuth University for another season and compiled a 20–5 overall record, and defeating opponents 41–17 on average. In 2009, he led the Eagles to their best regular season record in school history with an unblemished 11–0 mark. Lambuth advanced to the second round of the NAIA playoffs for first time in 11 years—having won one game before suffering elimination to finish 12–1 as the sixth-ranked team in the NAIA.

=== Arkansas State ===
In 2010, he joined the staff of head coach Steve Roberts at Arkansas State as offensive coordinator, joining the program after spending less than two months, during the 2009–2010 offseason, as offensive coordinator at San Jose State University.

The Red Wolves finished 2010 with a 4–8 record, but their offensive rankings jumped from 95th in total offense and 90th in scoring offense in the NCAA Division I FBS to 43rd and 46th, respectively. The Red Wolves' offense broke nine school records including total plays (856), first downs (262), pass attempts (438), pass completions (266), completion percentage (.607), passing yards (3,057), passing yards per game (254.8), and passing touchdowns (23). The Red Wolves' offense averaged 403.4 yards per game, eclipsing over 300 yards all 12 times it took the field for the first time in the history of the program. A-State posted at least 400 yards of total offense in seven games during the 2010 campaign, the most ever as an NCAA FBS member, all in his first year as offensive coordinator. After the season, Roberts was fired and Freeze was promoted to head coach.

In 2011, his only season as head coach at Arkansas State, he led the Red Wolves to a 10–2 record and their first Sun Belt Conference title since 2005. The Red Wolves' offense averaged 447.8 ypg (28th nationally, 1st in Sun Belt Conference) including 293.6 ypg passing and 154.2 ypg rushing. Freeze left Arkansas State before Arkansas State's post-season appearance in the GoDaddy.com Bowl.

=== Ole Miss ===
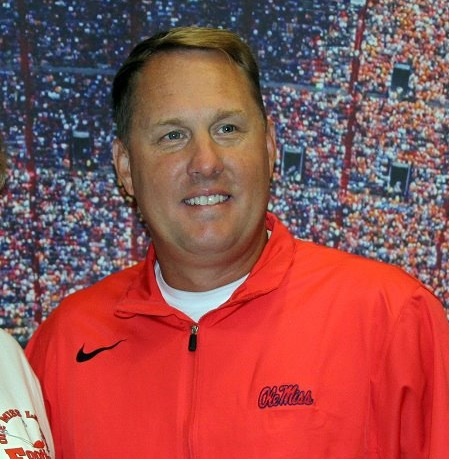
Freeze with Ole Miss in 2011

On December 5, 2011, Freeze was announced as the 37th head coach of the University of Mississippi. During the press conference to introduce him as the head coach, Freeze said he wanted to "retire at Ole Miss." He was signed to a four-year contract with an annual salary of $1.5 million plus incentives up to $2.5 million. His salary was later reported to be $4.7 million, making him the highest-paid employee in the state of Mississippi.

In his first season at Ole Miss, Freeze led the Rebels to a 6–6 record in the regular season, including a 41–24 victory over Mississippi State in the Egg Bowl. Eligible to play in a bowl game for the first time since 2009, Ole Miss played in the BBVA Compass Bowl in Birmingham, Alabama, on January 5, 2013, defeating the University of Pittsburgh 38–17 to finish 7–6.

Freeze received national attention on National Signing Day 2013 as Ole Miss brought in the fifth-ranked recruiting class in the country. In the 2013 season, he finished with a 7–5 record in the regular season. The Rebels defeated Georgia Tech in the Music City Bowl.

Freeze won the 2014 Grant Teaff Coach of the Year award by the Fellowship of Christian Athletes.

During Freeze's third season at Ole Miss, he led the Rebels to a 7–0 start, the program's best start since the Johnny Vaught era. By October, they had risen as high as third in the nation, their highest ranking at that late stage in the season in almost half a century. They ultimately finished 9–3, only the third time since Vaught's tenure that Ole Miss has won that many games in the regular season. That netted them an appearance in the 2014 Peach Bowl: their first major bowl appearance since the 1970 Sugar Bowl, and the biggest since Vaught's tenure.

On September 19, 2015, Freeze's Rebels beat Alabama, 43–37, in Tuscaloosa, Alabama, making Freeze only the third SEC head coach, along with Les Miles and Steve Spurrier, to defeat a Nick Saban-coached team in back-to-back years. The victory catapulted the Rebels to No. 3 in the AP rankings. They went on to tally their second straight nine-win season, and garnered a berth in the 2016 Sugar Bowl, where they won 48–20 over Oklahoma State. They finished ninth in the AP Poll and 10th in the Coaches' Poll—their first top-10 finishes in a final poll since 1969. It was also only the Rebels' third 10-win season since the Vaught era.

==== Scandals and resignation ====
In January 2016, the NCAA charged Ole Miss with numerous recruiting violations. An investigation turned up evidence that Ole Miss employees and boosters arranged numerous "impermissible benefits" for players, such as car loans and cash. At least one recruit was suspected of getting help on his college entrance exam. Ole Miss officials began calling reporters, telling them falsely that most of the alleged violations had taken place under Freeze's predecessor Houston Nutt.

The investigation reopened soon after star offensive tackle Laremy Tunsil admitted taking money from one of Freeze's assistants. In February 2017—three months after suffering its first losing season since the year Freeze arrived—Ole Miss withdrew from bowl consideration for the upcoming season. The move came on the same day that the NCAA sent an updated notice of allegations charging the Rebels with eight additional violations. Most seriously, it accused Freeze of not monitoring his assistants, and also accused Ole Miss of not properly controlling the program. The new allegations brought the total to 21: four under Nutt and 17 under Freeze.

Freeze continued to recruit players during the investigation. Six Ole Miss players, including star quarterback Shea Patterson and future NFL players Van Jefferson and Tre Nixon, later said Freeze and other Ole Miss officials repeatedly lied to them during their recruitment about the severity of the pending charges. After the charges became public, these players sought to transfer to other schools; each requested and received a waiver to the NCAA rule that would have prevented them from playing for a year.

On July 13, 2017, Nutt sued Ole Miss for defamation, contending that Freeze and school officials had "conspired to smear him" with false claims about the charges. On October 16, 2017, Ole Miss settled the lawsuit and issued a public apology to Nutt.

As part of discovery for the lawsuit, Nutt's attorneys filed a freedom-of-information request for calls Freeze made on his university-issued cell phone during January 2016. While reviewing those records, Nutt's attorneys discovered a call to a number associated with a female escort service, and alerted Ole Miss officials about it. Freeze claimed it was a misdialed number. School officials investigated, and discovered what they later described as "a concerning pattern" of similar calls dating back to shortly after he arrived in Oxford: at least a dozen calls over 33 months, often made while Freeze was traveling on business trips using Ole Miss' private plane. On July 20, 2017, chancellor Jeff Vitter and athletic director Ross Bjork gave Freeze an ultimatum: resign or be fired for violating the morals clause of his contract. Freeze opted to resign; offensive coordinator Matt Luke was named interim coach.

In February 2019, the NCAA punished the Ole Miss football team for the recruiting and academic violations committed under both Nutt and Freeze. "The panel found the involved head coach [Freeze] failed to monitor the program, allowing his staff to knowingly commit a series of recruiting violations, submit false information on recruiting paperwork and not report known violations," an NCAA statement said. The punishments included a two-year postseason ban, three years of probation, and a four-year ban on some scholarships. As well, the NCAA forced Ole Miss to vacate 33 wins from 2010 to 2016. As a result, 27 of Freeze's wins were stripped from the books; only the 2015 season was unaffected. His record at Ole Miss is now officially 12–25; it was 39–25 on the field.

=== Liberty ===
On October 11, 2018, Freeze was offered a job as offensive coordinator of the Arizona Hotshots of the Alliance of American Football league; he turned it down.

Freeze was named head coach of the Liberty Flames football team on December 7, 2018.

Before his first game as head coach of the Flames, Freeze received surgery on his back for a herniated disc. Despite uncertainty as to whether he would recover in time for the first game against Syracuse University, he made it to the game, coaching from a hospital bed in the coaching booth. Liberty lost the game 24-0.

In his first year with the team, the Liberty Flames played to a 7–5 record, qualified for bowl games for the first time in school history, and accepted an invitation to the Cure Bowl in Orlando, Florida.

On December 10, 2019, Freeze signed a five-year extension with Liberty.

In 2020, the Flames finished with a 10–1 record, including a 15–14 loss to NC State. Freeze tested positive for COVID-19 on December 11, 2020. He returned in time to coach Liberty in the 2020 Cure Bowl, and beat Coastal Carolina. Freeze was rumored to be a candidate in several SEC coaching searches, including searches to replace South Carolina's Will Muschamp and Auburn's Gus Malzahn. He declined interest in any of these positions, saying, "I won't even entertain things of that nature at this point".

In the 2021 season, he led the Flames to a 7–5 regular season record. He led the team to a 56–20 victory over Eastern Michigan in the LendingTree Bowl.

In January and July 2022, Freeze sent multiple unsolicited direct messages on Twitter to Chelsea Andrews, a former student at Liberty. Andrews, a sexual assault survivor, had sued Liberty over the handling of her case. She was also publicly critical of Liberty's decision to hire athletic director Ian McCaw, who had resigned from his previous job at Baylor University after the university sanctioned him for failing to identify and respond to a pattern of sexual violence by student-athletes. Freeze, in his messages to Andrews, defended McCaw and called him "the most Jesus like leader I have ever seen or been around." Freeze later told ESPN that he was sorry for sending the messages.

=== Auburn ===
On November 29, 2022, Auburn University announced that it had hired Freeze to be the 31st head coach of the Auburn Tigers football team, signing a six-year contract paying an average of $6.5 million annually. He finished his first season at Auburn with a 6–6 regular-season mark. The team lost in the Music City Bowl to Maryland to drop to 6–7. In the 2024 season, Auburn finished with a 5–7 record. A highlight of the season was a 43–41 4OT win over #15 Texas A&M.

Auburn had a 3–0 start to the 2025 season before dropping four straight games to ranked opponents, three of the four losses being by seven points or less. On November 2, 2025, following a 10–3 loss to Kentucky, Auburn fired Freeze, giving him $15,437,500 to terminate his contract. He had a 15–19 record with the Tigers, including 6–16 in SEC play.

== Personal life ==
Freeze and his wife Jill have three daughters; Ragan, Jordan, and Madison. Freeze has said he is a born-again Christian and has been outspoken about his faith throughout his coaching career. In 2018, the Baptist Press described him as "a regular speaker at churches and conferences whose Twitter account is filled with Christian references." After he was forced to resign from Ole Miss for his calls to escort services, "he faced scrutiny and criticism not only as a rising star in the coaching world, but as a high profile evangelical Christian, too," wrote the Tennessean. Freeze was diagnosed with prostate cancer in 2025, but it was caught in the early stages. He is expected to make a full recovery.

== Head coaching record ==
| Year | Team | Overall | Conference | Standing | Bowl/playoffs | Coaches^{#} | AP^{°} |
|---|---|---|---|---|---|---|---|
Lambuth Eagles (Mid-South Conference) (2008–2009)
| 2008 | Lambuth | 8–4 | 4–1 | T–1st (West) | | | |
| 2009 | Lambuth | 12–1 | 6–0 | 1st (West) | L NAIA Quarterfinal | | |
| Lambuth: | | 20–5 | 10–1 | | | | |
Arkansas State Red Wolves (Sun Belt Conference) (2011)
| 2011 | Arkansas State | 10–2 | 8–0 | 1st | GoDaddy.com (Note: Did not coach bowl game) | | |
| Arkansas State: | | 10–2 | 8–0 | | | | |
Ole Miss Rebels (Southeastern Conference) (2012–2016)
| 2012 | Ole Miss | 7–6 | 3–5 | 5th (Western) | W BBVA Compass | | |
| 2013 | Ole Miss | 8–5 | 3–5 | T–5th (Western) | W Music City | | |
| 2014 | Ole Miss | 9–4 | 5–3 | 3rd (Western) | L Peach^{†} | 19 | 17 |
| 2015 | Ole Miss | 10–3 | 6–2 | 2nd (Western) | W Sugar^{†} | 9 | 10 |
| 2016 | Ole Miss | 5–7 | 2–6 | 7th (Western) | | | |
| Ole Miss: | | 39–25 | 19–21 | | | | |
Liberty Flames (NCAA Division I FBS independent) (2019–2022)
| 2019 | Liberty | 8–5 | | | W Cure | | |
| 2020 | Liberty | 10–1 | | | W Cure | 18 | 17 |
| 2021 | Liberty | 8–5 | | | W LendingTree | | |
| 2022 | Liberty | 8–4 | | | Boca Raton (Note: Did not coach bowl game) | | |
| Liberty: | | 34–15 | | | | | |
Auburn Tigers (Southeastern Conference) (2023–2025)
| 2023 | Auburn | 6–7 | 3–5 | 5th (Western) | L Music City | | |
| 2024 | Auburn | 5–7 | 2–6 | T–13th | | | |
| 2025 | Auburn | 4–5 (Note: Auburn fired Freeze after nine games.) | 1–5 | | | | |
| Auburn: | | 15–19 | 6–16 | | | | |
| Total: | | 91–66 | | | | | |
National championship Conference title Conference division title or championship game berth
^{†}Indicates Bowl Coalition, Bowl Alliance, BCS, or CFP / New Years' Six bowl.; ^{#}Rankings from final Coaches Poll.; ^{°}Rankings from final AP Poll.

== See also ==
- Vladimir Nazlymov, college coach found guilty of NCAA level 1 violations
