= Shay Hodge =

American football player (born 1987)

No. 83
- Position: Wide receiver

Personal information
- Born: October 18, 1987 (age 39); Morton, Mississippi, U.S.
- Listed height: 6 ft 2 in (1.88 m)
- Listed weight: 207 lb (94 kg)

Career information
- High school: Morton
- College: Ole Miss
- NFL draft: 2010: undrafted

Career history
- Washington Redskins (2010)*; Cincinnati Bengals (2010–2011); Georgia Force (2012); Kansas City Command (2012); New Orleans VooDoo (2013)*; Hamilton Tiger-Cats (2013); Jacksonville Sharks (2016)*; Saskatchewan Roughriders (2016)*
- * Offseason or practice squad member only

Awards and highlights
- First-team All-SEC (2009)

Career AFL statistics
- Receptions: 53
- Yards: 595
- Touchdowns: 10
- Kick Return Yards: 261
- Kick Return Touchdowns: 0
- Stats at Pro Football Reference

Vareion Deshay "Shay" Hodge (born October 18, 1987) is an American former professional football player who was a wide receiver in the National Football League (NFL). He was signed by the Washington Redskins as an undrafted free agent in 2010. He played college football for the Ole Miss Rebels.

== College career ==
Hodge played for the Ole Miss Rebels from 2006 to 2009.

== Professional career ==
=== Washington Redskins ===
Hodge originally signed a free-agent contract with the San Francisco 49ers but was released during rookie camp. Following his release, he was immediately offered a spot with the Washington Redskins and signed a contract with them. He was waived during final cuts.

=== Cincinnati Bengals ===
Hodge was signed to the Cincinnati Bengals practice squad on September 8, 2010.

=== Georgia Force ===
Hodge has signed with the Georgia Force of the Arena Football League for 2012.

=== Kansas City Command ===
Hodge was traded to the Kansas City Command on March 5, 2012, along with John Gianninoto

=== New Orleans VooDoo ===
Hodge signed with the New Orleans VooDoo for the 2013 season.

=== Jacksonville Sharks ===
On October 16, 2015, Hodge was assigned to the Jacksonville Sharks. On June 20, 2016, Hodge was placed on reassignment.

=== Saskatchewan Roughriders ===
Hodge signed with the Saskatchewan Roughriders on January 29, 2016. He was released on June 14, 2016.
