= Donte Moncrief =

American football player (born 1993)

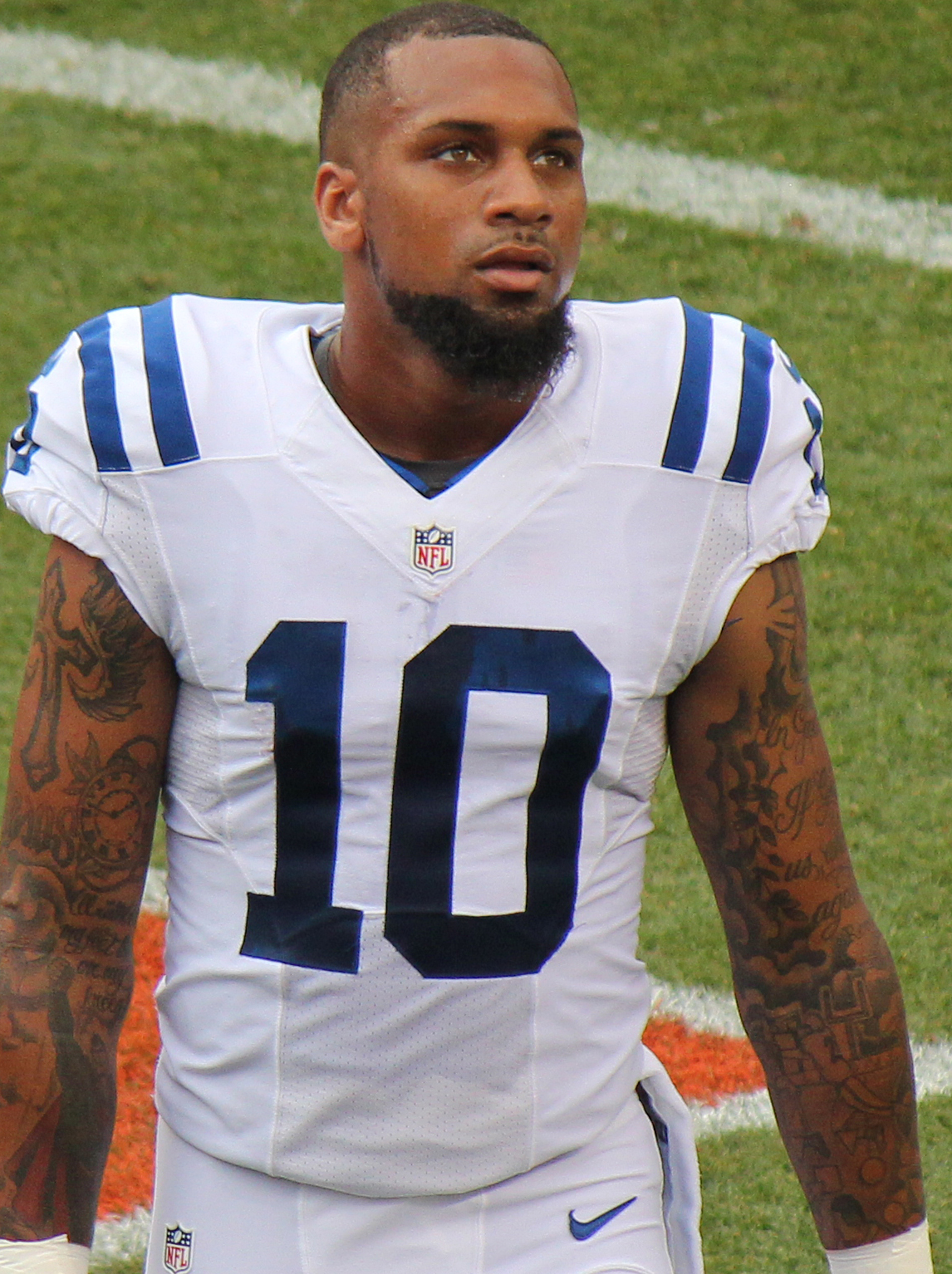
- Moncrief with the Indianapolis Colts in 2014

No. 10, 19, 11, 14
- Position: Wide receiver

Personal information
- Born: August 6, 1993 (age 33); Raleigh, Mississippi, U.S.
- Listed height: 6 ft 2 in (1.88 m)
- Listed weight: 216 lb (98 kg)

Career information
- High school: Raleigh
- College: Ole Miss (2011–2013)
- NFL draft: 2014: 3rd round, 90th overall pick

Career history
- Indianapolis Colts (2014–2017); Jacksonville Jaguars (2018); Pittsburgh Steelers (2019); Carolina Panthers (2019); New York Jets (2020)*; New England Patriots (2020); Houston Texans (2021)*
- * Offseason or practice squad member only

Career NFL statistics
- Receptions: 205
- Receiving yards: 2,576
- Receiving average: 12.6
- Receiving touchdowns: 21
- Stats at Pro Football Reference

Donte Rakeem Moncrief (born August 6, 1993) is an American former professional football player who was a wide receiver in the National Football League (NFL). He played college football for the Ole Miss Rebels, and was selected by the Indianapolis Colts in the third round of the 2014 NFL draft.

== Early life ==
A native of Raleigh, Mississippi, Moncrief attended Raleigh High School. He registered 21 catches for 441 yards and 9 touchdowns as a senior while also passing for 365 yards with 2 touchdowns and rushing 12 times for 144 yards. He also returned two punts for touchdowns. He collected 48 tackles, four for loss, and four interceptions on defense.

In addition to football, Moncrief also competed in track & field for the Lions, where he was one of the state's top performers in the long jump. He was a two-time 3A state champion in the long jump event, with a personal-best mark of 7.76 meters (25-1.5).

Considered a four-star recruit by Rivals.com, he was rated as the 17th best wide receiver prospect in the nation.

== College career ==
Moncrief attended the University of Mississippi from 2011 to 2013. During his collegiate career, he had 156 receptions for 2,371 yards and 20 touchdowns.

Moncrief announced on January 3, 2014 that he would forgo his senior season and enter the 2014 NFL draft.

== Professional career ==
Pre-draft measurables
Height	Weight	Arm length	Hand span	40-yard dash	10-yard split	20-yard split	20-yard shuttle	Three-cone drill	Vertical jump	Broad jump	Bench press
6 ft 2 3/8 in (1.89 m)	221 lb (100 kg)	32 3/8 in (0.82 m)	9 1/8 in (0.23 m)	4.40 s	1.54 s	2.51 s	4.30 s	7.02 s	39.5 in (1.00 m)	11 ft 0 in (3.35 m)	13 reps
All values from NFL Combine

=== Indianapolis Colts ===
Moncrief was selected in the third round, with the 90th overall pick, by the Indianapolis Colts in the 2014 NFL draft. On May 30, 2014, the Colts officially signed him to his rookie contract. In Week 8 against the Pittsburgh Steelers, Moncrief scored his first NFL touchdown on a pass from quarterback Andrew Luck. In Week 13, Moncrief had three receptions for a career-high 134 yards and two touchdowns to help the Colts beat the Washington Redskins, 49–27. He finished his rookie season with 32 receptions for 444 yards and three touchdowns.

In the 2015 season, Moncrief had a career-high 64 receptions for 733 yards and six touchdowns. In 2016, Moncrief missed six games with a shoulder sprain and another with a hamstring issue, but still managed to catch seven touchdowns. In 2017, his catches dropped to 26 (a career-low at the time) due to injuries of his own as well as Luck missing the entire season.

=== Jacksonville Jaguars ===
On March 15, 2018, Moncrief signed a one-year, $9.6 million fully guaranteed contract with the Jacksonville Jaguars. In Week 4, in a victory over the New York Jets, Moncrief totaled five receptions for 109 yards and a touchdown. He finished the season with 48 receptions for 668 yards and three touchdowns.

=== Pittsburgh Steelers ===
On March 14, 2019, Moncrief signed a two-year contract with the Pittsburgh Steelers. Moncrief made his debut with the Steelers in Week 1 against the New England Patriots, where he caught 3-of-10 passes for seven yards in the 33–3 loss. On November 2, he was released by Pittsburgh after putting up just four catches out of 15 targets for 18 yards and no touchdowns through five games.

=== Carolina Panthers ===
On November 4, 2019, Moncrief was claimed off waivers by the Carolina Panthers. He was released by Carolina on December 6.

Moncrief had a tryout with the San Francisco 49ers on August 13, 2020, and with the New York Jets on August 19.

=== New York Jets ===
On August 31, 2020, Moncrief signed with the New York Jets. On September 5, he was released by the Jets as a part of final roster cuts and was re–signed to the practice squad the next day. Moncrief was placed on the practice squad/injured list on September 10, activated back to the practice squad on October 7, and released on October 14.

=== New England Patriots ===
On November 4, 2020, the New England Patriots signed Moncrief to their practice squad. He was elevated to the active roster on November 21 and November 28 for the team's Weeks 11 and 12 games against the Houston Texans and Arizona Cardinals, reverting to the practice squad after each game. Against the Cardinals, Moncrief had a 53-yard kick return. On December 5, he was signed to the active roster.

=== Houston Texans ===
Moncrief signed a one-year contract with the Houston Texans on March 22, 2021. Moncrief was released by the Texans on July 27.

On February 18, 2023, Moncrief announced his retirement from professional football.

== NFL career statistics ==
Regular season statistics
Year	Team	Games		Receiving					Rushing					Fumbles	
Year	Team	GP	GS	Rec	Yds	Avg	Lng	TD	Att	Yds	Avg	Lng	TD	Fum	Lost
2014	IND	16	2	32	444	13.9	79T	3	4	17	4.3	7	0	0	0
2015	IND	16	10	64	733	11.5	33	6	—	—	—	—	—	0	0
2016	IND	9	7	30	307	10.2	39	7	1	−1	−1.0	−1	0	0	0
2017	IND	12	8	26	391	15.0	60	2	—	—	—	—	—	0	0
2018	JAX	16	14	48	668	13.9	80T	3	—	—	—	—	—	1	1
2019	PIT	5	2	4	18	4.5	11	0	—	—	—	—	—	0	0
2019	CAR	3	0	—	—	—	—	—	—	—	—	—	—	0	0
2020	NE	6	0	1	15	15.0	15	0	1	4	4.0	4	0	0	0
Total		83	43	205	2,576	12.6	80	21	6	20	3.3	7	0	1	1

Postseason statistics
Year	Team	Games		Receiving					Rushing					Fumbles	
Year	Team	GP	GS	Rec	Yds	Avg	Lng	TD	Att	Yds	Avg	Lng	TD	Fum	Lost
2014	IND	2	0	5	86	17.2	36T	1	—	—	—	—	—	0	0
Total		2	0	5	86	17.2	36T	1	—	—	—	—	—	0	0
