= David Williams (running back) =

American football player (born 1994)

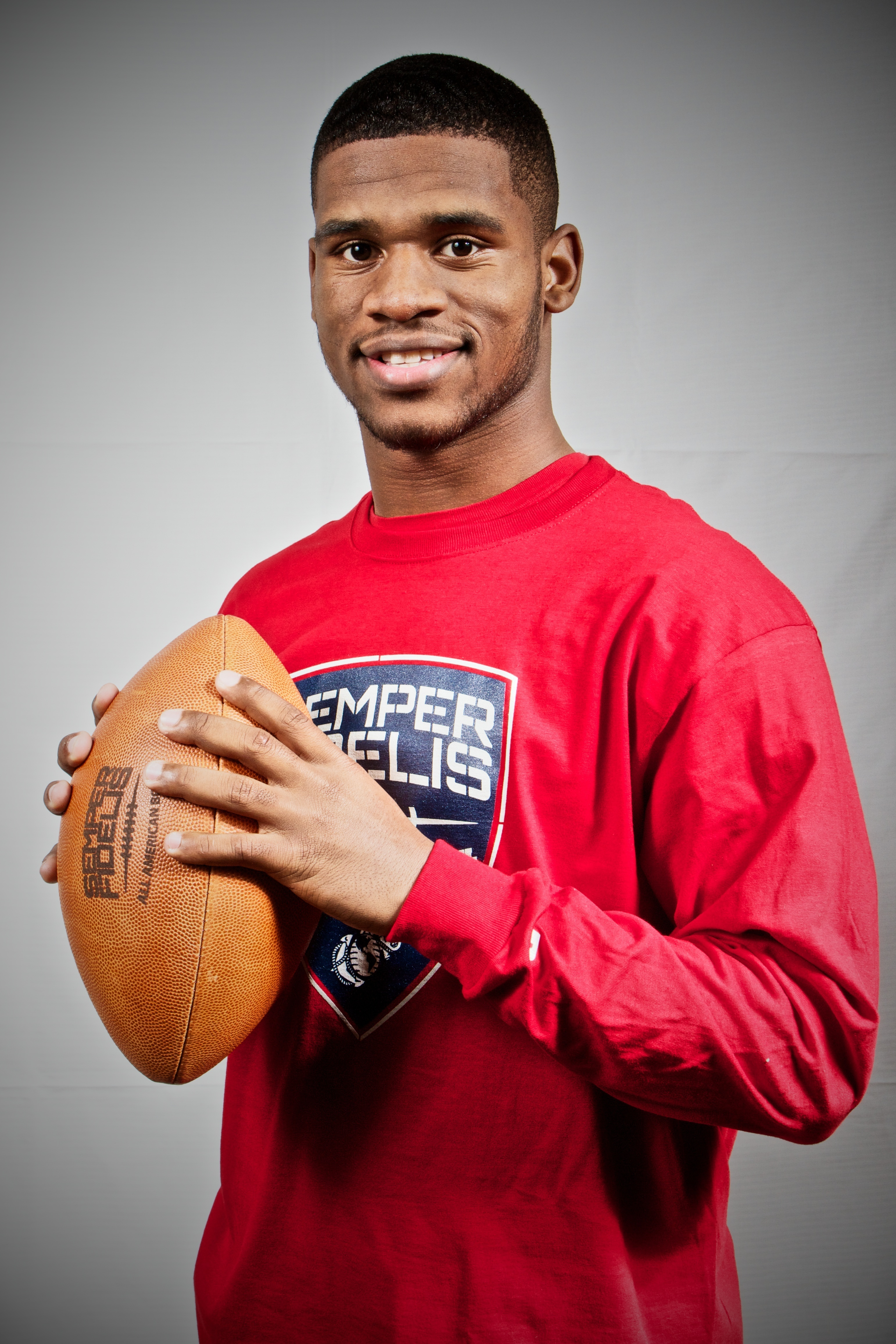
- Williams in 2012

No. 33
- Position: Running back

Personal information
- Born: June 17, 1994 (age 32); Philadelphia, Pennsylvania, U.S.
- Listed height: 6 ft 1 in (1.85 m)
- Listed weight: 229 lb (104 kg)

Career information
- High school: Imhotep Institute Charter (Philadelphia)
- College: South Carolina (2014-2016); Arkansas (2017)
- NFL draft: 2018: 7th round, 226th overall pick

Career history
- Denver Broncos (2018)*; Jacksonville Jaguars (2018); Denver Broncos (2019)*; Detroit Lions (2019)*; Indianapolis Colts (2019)*
- * Offseason or practice squad member only

Career NFL statistics
- Rushing attempts: 8
- Rushing yards: 36
- Stats at Pro Football Reference

David Williams (born June 17, 1994) is an American former professional football player who was a running back in the National Football League (NFL). He played college football for the South Carolina Gamecocks and Arkansas Razorbacks.

== Early life ==
Williams attended and played high school football at Imhotep Institute Charter High School.

== College career ==
Williams played college football for South Carolina from 2014 to 2016. He transferred to Arkansas for the 2017 season.

=== Collegiate statistics ===
Year	School	Conf	Class	Pos	G	Rushing				Receiving			
Year	School	Conf	Class	Pos	G	Att	Yds	Avg	TD	Rec	Yds	Avg	TD
2014	South Carolina	SEC	FR	RB	8	45	256	5.7	2	7	99	14.1	0
2015	South Carolina	SEC	SO	RB	12	86	299	3.5	0	11	93	8.5	0
2016	South Carolina	SEC	JR	RB	9	56	239	4.3	3	9	72	8.0	0
2017	Arkansas	SEC	SR	RB	12	117	656	5.6	8	10	171	17.1	2
Career	Overall				41	304	1,450	4.8	13	37	435	11.8	2

== Professional career ==
=== Denver Broncos (first stint) ===
Williams was selected by the Denver Broncos in the seventh round (226th overall) of the 2018 NFL draft. He was waived on September 1, 2018 and was signed to the practice squad the next day.

=== Jacksonville Jaguars ===
The Jacksonville Jaguars signed Williams off Denver's practice squad on October 9, 2018. As a rookie, he appeared in six games and had eight carries for 36 rushing yards. On May 9, 2019, the Jaguars waived Williams.

=== Denver Broncos (second stint) ===
On July 19, 2019, Williams re-signed with the Broncos. He was waived on August 31, 2019.

=== Detroit Lions ===
On September 11, 2019, Williams was signed to the Detroit Lions practice squad, but was released the next day.

=== Indianapolis Colts ===
On September 18, 2019, Williams was signed to the Indianapolis Colts practice squad, but was released two days later.
