= 2017 Southeastern Conference football season =

- League: NCAA Division I Football Bowl Subdivision
- Sport: Football
- Duration: August 31, 2017 through January 2018
- Teams: 14
- TV partner(s): CBS, CBSSN, ESPN, ESPN2, ESPN3, ESPNU, SECN

2018 NFL Draft
- Top draft pick: Roquan Smith (Georgia)
- Picked by: Chicago Bears, 8th overall

Regular season
- East champions: Georgia
- East runners-up: South Carolina
- West champions: Auburn

SEC Championship Game
- Champions: Georgia
- Runners-up: Auburn

Football seasons
- 2016 2018

2017 Southeastern Conference football standings
	Conf.			Overall
Team	W		L	W		L
Eastern Division
No. 2 Georgia x$^	7	–	1	13	–	2
South Carolina	5	–	3	9	–	4
Kentucky	4	–	4	7	–	6
Missouri	4	–	4	7	–	6
Florida	3	–	5	4	–	7
Vanderbilt	1	–	7	5	–	7
Tennessee	0	–	8	4	–	8
Western Division
No. 10 Auburn xy	7	–	1	10	–	4
No. 1 Alabama x#^	7	–	1	13	–	1
No. 18 LSU	6	–	2	9	–	4
No. 19 Mississippi State	4	–	4	9	–	4
Texas A&M	4	–	4	7	–	6
Ole Miss*	3	–	5	6	–	6
Arkansas	1	–	7	4	–	8
Championship: Georgia 28, Auburn 7
# – College Football Playoff champion; ^ – College Football Playoff participant; $ – Conference champion; x – Division champion/co-champions; y – Championship game participant; * Ole Miss ineligible for postseason due to NCAA sanctions; Rankings from AP Poll

The 2017 Southeastern Conference football season was the 85th season of SEC football and took place during the 2017 NCAA Division I FBS football season. The season began on August 31 and will end with the 2017 SEC Championship Game on December 2. The SEC is a Power Five conference under the College Football Playoff format along with the Atlantic Coast Conference, the Big 12 Conference, the Big Ten Conference, and the Pac–12 Conference. For the 2017 season, the SEC has 14 teams divided into two divisions of seven each, named East and West.

== Preseason ==
=== Recruiting classes ===
National Rankings
Team	ESPN	Rivals	Scout	24/7	Total Signees
Alabama	#1	#1	#1	#1	29
Arkansas	#26	#24	#27	#27	27
Auburn	#9	#14	#11	#9	23
Florida	#13	#9	#10	#10	23
Georgia	#3	#3	#2	#3	25
Kentucky	#30	#26	#35	#31	24
LSU	#7	#8	#7	#7	23
Ole Miss	#36	#39	#29	#29	21
Mississippi State	#24	#27	#25	#24	24
Missouri	#54	#48	#40	#42	24
South Carolina	#19	#16	#21	#21	24
Tennessee	#15	#15	#16	#17	27
Texas A&M	#11	#10	#9	#12	27
Vanderbilt	#60	#57	#69	#65	20

=== SEC media days ===
The SEC conducted its annual media days at the Hyatt Regency Birmingham – The Wynfrey Hotel in Hoover, Alabama between July 11 and July 14. The event commenced with a speech by commissioner Greg Sankey, and all 14 teams sent their head coaches and three selected players to speak with members of the media. The event along with all speakers and interviews were broadcast live on the SEC Network and streamed live on ESPN.com.

==== Preseason media polls ====
The SEC Media Days concluded with its annual preseason media polls. Since 1992, the credentialed media has gotten the preseason champion correct just six times. Only nine times has the preseason pick even made it to the SEC title game. Below are the results of the media poll with total points received next to each school and first-place votes in parentheses.

SEC Champion Voting

- Alabama – 217
- Auburn – 11
- Georgia – 6
- Florida – 3
- LSU – 3
- Texas A&M – 1
- South Carolina – 1
- Arkansas – 1
- Vanderbilt – 1

West Division

1. Alabama – 1,683 (225)
2. Auburn – 1,329 (13)
3. LSU – 1,262 (4)
4. Arkansas – 796 (1)
5. Texas A&M – 722
6. Mississippi State – 633
7. Ole Miss – 379

East Division

1. Georgia – 1,572 (138)
2. Florida – 1,526 (96)
3. Tennessee – 998 (3)
4. South Carolina – 897 (5)
5. Kentucky – 869
6. Vanderbilt – 554 (1)
7. Missouri - 388

==== Preseason All-SEC Media ====
First Team Offense
Position	Player	Class	Team
QB	Jalen Hurts	SO	Alabama
RB	Derrius Guice	JR	LSU
RB	Nick Chubb	SR	Georgia
WR	Calvin Ridley	JR	Alabama
WR	Christian Kirk	JR	Texas A&M
TE	Isaac Nauta	SO	Georgia
OL	Braden Smith	SR	Auburn
OL	Martez Ivey	JR	Florida
OL	Jonah Williams	SO	Alabama
OL	Ross Pierschbacher	JR	Alabama
C	Frank Ragnow	SR	Arkansas

First Team Defense
Position	Player	Class	Team
DL	Daron Payne	JR	Alabama
DL	Da'Shawn Hand	SR	Alabama
DL	Trenton Thompson	JR	Georgia
DL	Marquis Haynes	Sr	Ole Miss
LB	Arden Key	JR	LSU
LB	Rashaan Evans	SR	Alabama
LB	Roquan Smith	JR	Georgia
DB	Minkah Fitzpatrick	JR	Alabama
DB	Ronnie Harrison	JR	Alabama
DB	Armani Watts	JR	Texas A&M
DB	Duke Dawson	SR	Florida

First Team Special Teams
Position	Player	Class	Team
P	J. K. Scott	SR	Alabama
K	Eddy Piñeiro	JR	Florida
RS	Evan Berry	JR	Tennessee
AP	Derrius Guice	JR	LSU

== Head coaches ==
Note: All stats shown are before the beginning of the season.

Team	Head coach	Years at school	Overall record	Record at school	SEC record
Alabama	Nick Saban	11	205–61–1	114–19	65–12
Arkansas	Bret Bielema	5	93–50	25–26	10–22
Auburn	Gus Malzahn	5	44–21	35–18	18–14
Florida	Jim McElwain	3	41–24	19–8	13–3
Georgia	Kirby Smart	2	8–5	8–5	4-4
Kentucky	Mark Stoops	5	19–30	19–30	8–24
LSU	Ed Orgeron	1	22–29	6–2	4–2
Ole Miss	Matt Luke	1	0–0	0–0	0–0
Mississippi State	Dan Mullen	9	61–42	61–42	29–35
Missouri	Barry Odom	2	4–8	4–8	2–6
South Carolina	Will Muschamp	2	34–28	6–7	3–5
Tennessee	Butch Jones	5	80–48	30–21	14–18
Texas A&M	Kevin Sumlin	6	79–38	44–21	21–19
Vanderbilt	Derek Mason	4	13–24	13–24	5–19

== Rankings ==
Legend
	Increase in ranking
	Decrease in ranking
	Not ranked previous week
RV	Received votes but were not ranked in Top 25 of poll

		Pre	Wk 1	Wk 2	Wk 3	Wk 4	Wk 5	Wk 6	Wk 7	Wk 8	Wk 9	Wk 10	Wk 11	Wk 12	Wk 13	Wk 14	Final
Alabama	AP	1 (52)	1 (60)	1 (58)	1 (45)	1 (52)	1 (44)	1 (43)	1 (61)	1 (61)	1 (59)	1 (56)	1 (57)	1 (58)	5	4	
Alabama	C	1 (49)	1 (60)	1 (58)	1 (59)	1 (59)	1 (58)	1 (57)	1 (63)	1 (64)	1 (65)	1 (64)	1 (63)	1 (64)	5	4	
Alabama	CFP	Not released									2	2	1	1	5	4	
Arkansas	AP																
Arkansas	C	RV	RV		RV		RV										
Arkansas	CFP	Not released															
Auburn	AP	12	13	15	15	13	12	10	21	19	16	10	6	6	4	7	
Auburn	C	13	13	17	16	15	13	11	21	19	15	10	6	6	4 (4)	8	
Auburn	CFP	Not released									14	10	6	6	2	7	
Florida	AP	17	22	24	20	21	21	RV									
Florida	C	16	24	25	22	20	20	RV	RV	RV							
Florida	CFP	Not released															
Georgia	AP	15	15	13	11	7	5	4	3	3	2 (2)	2 (5)	7	7	6	3	
Georgia	C	15	15	13	12	8	6	5	3	3	2	2 (1)	7	7	6	3 (2)	
Georgia	CFP	Not released									1	1	7	7	6	3	
Kentucky	AP		RV		RV			RV	RV								
Kentucky	C		RV	RV	RV		RV	RV	RV	RV	RV		RV				
Kentucky	CFP	Not released															
LSU	AP	13	12	12	25	25		RV	24	23	19	RV	21	19	17	16	
LSU	C	12	12	11	23	22		RV	25	23	20	25	21	18	16	14	
LSU	CFP	Not released									19	24	20	18	17	17	
Mississippi State	AP		RV	RV	17	24			RV	RV	21	18	17	16	24	24	
Mississippi State	C	RV	RV	RV	19	24	RV	RV	RV	RV	22	18	19	17	24	23	
Mississippi State	CFP	Not released									16	16	16	14	23	23	
Missouri	AP														RV	RV	
Missouri	C																
Missouri	CFP	Not released															
Ole Miss	AP																
Ole Miss	C																
Ole Miss	CFP	Not released															
South Carolina	AP		RV	RV					RV	RV	RV		RV	RV			
South Carolina	C		RV	RV				RV	RV	RV	RV	RV	RV	RV	RV	RV	
South Carolina	CFP	Not released												24			
Tennessee	AP	25	25	23	RV	RV											
Tennessee	C	24	21	23	RV	RV											
Tennessee	CFP	Not released															
Texas A&M	AP	RV					RV	RV	RV	RV				RV			
Texas A&M	C	RV	RV			RV	RV	RV	24	24	RV			RV			
Texas A&M	CFP	Not released															
Vanderbilt	AP		RV	RV	RV												
Vanderbilt	C		RV	RV	RV												
Vanderbilt	CFP	Not released															

== Schedule ==
=== Regular season ===
Index to colors and formatting
Non-conference matchup; SEC member won
Non-conference matchup; SEC member lost
Conference matchup

All times Eastern time. SEC teams in bold.

Rankings reflect those of the AP poll for that week until week 10 when CFP rankings are used.

==== Week One ====
Date	Time	Visiting team	Home team	Site	Broadcast	Result	Attendance	Reference
August 31	8:00 p.m.	Florida A&M	**Arkansas**	War Memorial Stadium • Little Rock, AR	SECN	**W** 49–7	36,055	
September 2	12:00 p.m.	Missouri State	**Missouri**	Faurot Field • Columbia, MO	SECN	**W** 72–43	50,131	
September 2	3:00 p.m.	North Carolina State	**South Carolina**	Bank of America Stadium • Charlotte, NC	ESPN	**W** 35–28	50,367	
September 2	3:30 p.m.	#11 Michigan	#17 **Florida**	AT&T Stadium • Arlington, TX	ABC	**L** 17–33	75,802	
September 2	4:00 p.m.	**Kentucky**	Southern Miss	M. M. Roberts Stadium • Hattiesburg, MS	CBSSN	**W** 24–17	22,761	
September 2	4:00 p.m.	Charleston Southern	**Mississippi State**	Davis Wade Stadium • Starkville, MS	SECN	**W** 49–0	54,215	
September 2	6:15 p.m.	Appalachian State	#15 **Georgia**	Sanford Stadium • Athens, GA	ESPN	**W** 31–10	92,746	
September 2	7:30 p.m.	South Alabama	**Ole Miss**	Vaught–Hemingway Stadium • Oxford, MS	ESPNU	**W** 47–27	62,532	
September 2	7:30 p.m.	Georgia Southern	#12 **Auburn**	Jordan–Hare Stadium • Auburn, AL	SECN	**W** 41–7	87,451	
September 2	8:00 p.m.	**Vanderbilt**	Middle Tennessee	Floyd Stadium • Murfreesboro, TN	CBSSN	**W** 28–6	26,717	
September 2	8:00 p.m.	#1 **Alabama**	#3 Florida State	Mercedes-Benz Stadium • Atlanta, GA	ABC	**W** 24–7	76,330	
September 2	9:30 p.m.	BYU	#13 **LSU**	Mercedes-Benz Superdome • New Orleans, LA	ESPN	**W** 27–0	53,826	
September 3	7:30 p.m.	**Texas A&M**	UCLA	Rose Bowl • Pasadena, CA	FOX	**L** 44–45	64,635	
September 4	8:00 p.m.	#25 **Tennessee**	Georgia Tech	Mercedes-Benz Stadium • Atlanta, GA (rivalry)	ESPN	**W** 42–41 ^{2OT}	75,107	

==== Week Two ====
Date	Time	Visiting team	Home team	Site	Broadcast	Result	Attendance	Reference
September 9	12:00 p.m.	Northern Colorado	#22 **Florida**	Ben Hill Griffin Stadium • Gainesville, FL	SECN	**Canceled**^{[a]}		
September 9	12:00 p.m.	Eastern Kentucky	**Kentucky**	Kroger Field • Lexington, KY	SECN	**W** 27–16	54,868	
September 9	12:00 p.m.	UT Martin	**Ole Miss**	Vaught–Hemingway Stadium • Oxford, MS	SECN	**W** 45–23	60,476	
September 9	3:30 p.m.	Fresno State	#1 **Alabama**	Bryant–Denny Stadium • Tuscaloosa, AL	ESPN2	**W** 41–10	101,127	
September 9	3:30 p.m.	#23 TCU	**Arkansas**	Donald W. Reynolds Razorback Stadium • Fayetteville, AR	CBS	**L** 7–28	73,668	
September 9	4:00 p.m.	Indiana State	#25 **Tennessee**	Neyland Stadium • Knoxville, TN	SECN	**W** 42–7	99,015	
September 9	4:00 p.m.	Alabama A&M	**Vanderbilt**	Vanderbilt Stadium • Nashville, TN	SECN	**W** 42–0	25,802	
September 9	7:00 p.m.	#13 **Auburn**	#3 Clemson	Memorial Stadium • Clemson, SC (rivalry)	ESPN	**L** 6–14	81,799	
September 9	7:00 p.m.	**South Carolina**	**Missouri**	Faurot Field • Columbia, MO	ESPN2	**SCAR** 31–13	55,023	
September 9	7:00 p.m.	Nicholls State	**Texas A&M**	Kyle Field • College Station, TX	ESPNU	**W** 24–14	100,276	
September 9	7:30 p.m.	#15 **Georgia**	#24 Notre Dame	Notre Dame Stadium • South Bend, IN	NBC	**W** 20–19	77,622	
September 9	7:30 p.m.	Chattanooga	#12 **LSU**	Tiger Stadium • Baton Rouge, LA	SECN	**W** 45–10	97,289	
September 9	7:30 p.m.	**Mississippi State**	Louisiana Tech	Joe Aillet Stadium • Ruston, LA	CBSSN	**W** 57–21	28,100	

^{^[a]}The game between Florida and Northern Colorado was canceled due to Hurricane Irma. Both schools' athletic directors decided not to reschedule the game as the two teams do not share a common bye week.

==== Week Three ====
Date	Time	Visiting team	Home team	Site	TV	Result	Attendance	Ref.
September 16	12:00 p.m.	Louisiana	**Texas A&M**	Kyle Field • College Station, TX	SECN	**W** 45–21	98,412	
September 16	3:30 p.m.	No. 23 **Tennessee**	No. 24 **Florida**	Ben Hill Griffin Stadium • Gainesville, FL (rivalry)	CBS	**FLA** 26–20	87,736	
September 16	4:00 p.m.	Mercer	No. 15 **Auburn**	Jordan-Hare Stadium • Auburn, AL	SECN	**W** 24–10	87,033	
September 16	4:00 p.m.	Purdue	**Missouri**	Faurot Field • Columbia, MO	SECN	**L** 3–35	53,262	
September 16	7:00 p.m.	Colorado State	No. 1 **Alabama**	Bryant-Denny Stadium • Tuscaloosa, AL	ESPN2	**W** 41–23	101,821	
September 16	7:00 p.m.	No. 12 **LSU**	**Mississippi State**	Davis Wade Stadium • Starkville, MS (rivalry)	ESPN	**MISS ST** 37–7	60,596	
September 16	7:30 p.m.	Samford	No. 13 **Georgia**	Sanford Stadium • Athens, GA	SECN	**W** 42–14	92,746	
September 16	7:30 p.m.	**Kentucky**	**South Carolina**	Williams-Brice Stadium • Columbia, SC	SECN	**UK** 23–13	82,493	
September 16	7:30 p.m.	No. 18 Kansas State	**Vanderbilt**	Vanderbilt Stadium • Nashville, TN	ESPNU	**W** 14–7	40,350	
September 16	10:30 p.m.	**Ole Miss**	California	California Memorial Stadium • Berkeley, CA	ESPN	**L** 16–27	37,125	
^{#}Rankings from AP Poll released prior to game. All times are in Eastern Time.

==== Week Four ====
Date	Time	Visiting team	Home team	Site	TV	Result	Attendance	Ref.
September 23	12:00 p.m.	**Arkansas**	**Texas A&M**	AT&T Stadium • Arlington, TX (rivalry)	ESPN	**TAMU** 50–43 ^{OT}	64,668	
September 23	12:00 p.m.	UMass	**Tennessee**	Neyland Stadium • Knoxville, TN	SECN	**W** 17–13	95,324	
September 23	3:30 p.m.	No. 1 **Alabama**	**Vanderbilt**	Vanderbilt Stadium • Nashville, TN	CBS	**ALA** 59–0	40,350	
September 23	3:30 p.m.	Louisiana Tech	**South Carolina**	Williams-Brice Stadium • Columbia, SC	SECN	**W** 17–16	71,821	
September 23	7:00 p.m.	No. 17 **Mississippi State**	No. 11 **Georgia**	Sanford Stadium • Athens, GA	ESPN	**UGA** 31–3	92,746	
September 23	7:00 p.m.	Syracuse	No. 25 **LSU**	Tiger Stadium • Baton Rouge, LA	ESPN2	**W** 35–26	96,044	
September 23	7:30 p.m.	No. 15 **Auburn**	**Missouri**	Faurot Field • Columbia, MO	ESPNU	**AUB** 51–14	54,574	
September 23	7:30 p.m.	No. 20 **Florida**	**Kentucky**	Kroger Field • Lexington, KY	SECN	**FLA** 28–27	62,945	
^{#}Rankings from AP Poll released prior to game. All times are in Eastern Time.

==== Week Five ====
Date	Time	Visiting team	Home team	Site	TV	Result	Attendance	Ref.
September 30	12:00 p.m.	**Vanderbilt**	No. 21 **Florida**	Ben Hill Griffin Stadium • Gainesville, FL	ESPN	**FLA** 38–24	84,478	
September 30	12:00 p.m.	New Mexico State	**Arkansas**	Razorback Stadium • Fayetteville, AR	SECN	**W** 42–24	70,727	
September 30	3:30 p.m.	No. 7 **Georgia**	**Tennessee**	Neyland Stadium • Knoxville, TN (rivalry)	CBS	**UGA** 41–0	102,455	
September 30	4:00 p.m.	Eastern Michigan	**Kentucky**	Kroger Field • Lexington, KY	SECN	**W** 24–20	50,593	
September 30	6:00 p.m.	No. 24 **Mississippi State**	No. 13 **Auburn**	Jordan–Hare Stadium • Auburn, AL	ESPN	**AUB** 49–10	86,901	
September 30	7:00 p.m.	Troy	No. 25 **LSU**	Tiger Stadium • Baton Rouge, LA	ESPNU	**L** 20–24	99,879	
September 30	7:30 p.m.	**South Carolina**	**Texas A&M**	Kyle Field • College Station, TX	SECN	**TAMU** 24–17	96,430	
September 30	9:00 p.m.	**Ole Miss**	No. 1 **Alabama**	Bryant–Denny Stadium • Tuscaloosa, AL (rivalry)	ESPN	**ALA** 66–3	101,821	
^{#}Rankings from AP Poll released prior to game. All times are in Eastern Time.

==== Week Six ====
Date	Time	Visiting team	Home team	Site	TV	Result	Attendance	Ref.
October 7	12:00 p.m.	No. 5 **Georgia**	**Vanderbilt**	Vanderbilt Stadium • Nashville, TN (rivalry)	ESPN	**UGA** 45–14	36,282	
October 7	12:00 p.m.	**Ole Miss**	No. 12 **Auburn**	Jordan-Hare Stadium • Auburn, AL (rivalry)	SECN	**AUB** 44–23	86,700	
October 7	3:30 p.m.	**LSU**	No. 21 **Florida**	Ben Hill Griffin Stadium • Gainesville, FL (rivalry)	CBS	**LSU** 17–16	88,247	
October 7	4:00 p.m.	**Arkansas**	**South Carolina**	Williams-Brice Stadium • Columbia, SC	SECN	**SCAR** 48–22	79,416	
October 7	7:15 p.m.	No. 1 **Alabama**	**Texas A&M**	Kyle Field • College Station, TX	ESPN	**ALA** 27–19	101,058	
October 7	7:30 p.m.	**Missouri**	**Kentucky**	Kroger Field • Lexington, KY	SECN	**UK** 40–34	57,476	
^{#}Rankings from AP Poll released prior to game. All times are in Eastern Time.

==== Week Seven ====
Date	Time	Visiting team	Home team	Site	TV	Result	Attendance	Ref.
October 14	12:00 p.m.	BYU	**Mississippi State**	Davis Wade Stadium • Starkville, MS	SECN	**W** 35–10	54,866	
October 14	12:00 p.m.	**South Carolina**	**Tennessee**	Neyland Stadium • Knoxville, TN	ESPN	**SCAR** 15–9	98,104	
October 14	3:30 p.m.	No. 10 **Auburn**	**LSU**	Tiger Stadium • Baton Rouge, LA (rivalry)	CBS	**LSU** 27–23	101,601	
October 14	3:30 p.m.	**Vanderbilt**	**Ole Miss**	Vaught–Hemingway Stadium • Oxford, MS (rivalry)	SECN	**MISS** 57–35	60,157	
October 14	7:00 p.m.	**Texas A&M**	**Florida**	Ben Hill Griffin Stadium • Gainesville, FL	ESPN2	**TAMU** 19–17	86,114	
October 14	7:15 p.m.	**Arkansas**	No. 1 **Alabama**	Bryant-Denny Stadium • Tuscaloosa, AL	ESPN	**ALA** 41–9	101,821	
October 14	7:30 p.m.	**Missouri**	No. 4 **Georgia**	Sanford Stadium • Athens, GA	SECN	**UGA** 53–28	92,746	
^{#}Rankings from AP Poll released prior to game. All times are in Eastern Time.

==== Week Eight ====
Date	Time	Visiting team	Home team	Site	TV	Result	Attendance	Ref.
October 21	12:00 p.m.	Idaho	**Missouri**	Faurot Field • Columbia, MO	SECN	**W** 68–21	47,648	
October 21	3:30 p.m.	**Tennessee**	No. 1 **Alabama**	Bryant–Denny Stadium • Tuscaloosa, AL (rivalry)	CBS	**ALA** 45–7	101,821	
October 21	4:00 p.m.	**Kentucky**	**Mississippi State**	Davis Wade Stadium • Starkville, MS	SECN	**MISS ST** 45–7	58,963	
October 21	7:15 p.m.	No. 24 **LSU**	**Ole Miss**	Vaught-Hemingway Stadium • Oxford, MS (rivalry)	ESPN	**LSU** 40–24	64,067	
October 21	7:30 p.m.	No. 21 **Auburn**	**Arkansas**	Razorback Stadium • Fayetteville, AR	SECN	**AUB** 52–20	71,961	
^{#}Rankings from AP Poll released prior to game. All times are in Eastern Time.

==== Week Nine ====
Date	Time	Visiting team	Home team	Site	TV	Result	Attendance	Ref.
October 28	12:00 p.m.	**Arkansas**	**Ole Miss**	Vaught–Hemingway Stadium • Oxford, MS (rivalry)	SECN	**ARK** 38–37	55,684	
October 28	3:30 p.m.	No. 3 **Georgia**	**Florida**	EverBank Field • Jacksonville, FL (rivalry)	CBS	**UGA** 42–7	84,107	
October 28	4:00 p.m.	**Vanderbilt**	**South Carolina**	Williams-Brice Stadium • Columbia, SC	SECN	**SCAR** 34–27	78,992	
October 28	6:30 p.m.	**Missouri**	Connecticut	Rentschler Field • East Hartford, CT	CBSSN	**W** 52–12	21,062	
October 28	7:15 p.m.	**Mississippi State**	**Texas A&M**	Kyle Field • College Station, TX	ESPN	**MISS ST** 35–14	96,128	
October 28	7:30 p.m.	**Tennessee**	**Kentucky**	Kroger Field • Lexington, KY (rivalry)	SECN	**UK** 29–26	57,543	
^{#}Rankings from AP Poll released prior to game. All times are in Eastern Time.

==== Week Ten ====
Date	Time	Visiting team	Home team	Site	TV	Result	Attendance	Ref.
November 4	12:00 p.m.	No. 14 **Auburn**	**Texas A&M**	Kyle Field • College Station, TX	ESPN	**AUB** 42–27	100,257	
November 4	12:00 p.m.	UMass	No. 16 **Mississippi State**	Davis Wade Stadium • Starkville, MS	SECN	**W** 34–23	57,374	
November 4	12:00 p.m.	**Florida**	**Missouri**	Faurot Field • Columbia, MO	ESPN2	**MIZZOU** 45–16	49,154	
November 4	12:00 p.m.	Western Kentucky	**Vanderbilt**	Vanderbilt Stadium • Nashville, TN	ESPNU	**W** 31–17	26,350	
November 4	3:30 p.m.	**South Carolina**	No. 1 **Georgia**	Sanford Stadium • Athens, GA (rivalry)	CBS	**UGA** 24–10	92,746	
November 4	4:00 p.m.	Coastal Carolina	**Arkansas**	Razorback Stadium • Fayetteville, AR	SECN	**W** 39–38	61,476	
November 4	4:00 p.m.	**Ole Miss**	**Kentucky**	Kroger Field • Lexington, KY	SECN	**MISS** 37–34	55,665	
November 4	7:30 p.m.	Southern Miss	**Tennessee**	Neyland Stadium • Knoxville, TN	SECN	**W** 24–10	95,551	
November 4	8:00 p.m.	No. 19 **LSU**	No. 2 **Alabama**	Bryant-Denny Stadium • Tuscaloosa, AL (rivalry)	CBS	**ALA** 24–10	101,821	
^{#}Rankings from College Football Playoff. All times are in Eastern Time.

==== Week Eleven ====
Date	Time	Visiting team	Home team	Site	TV	Result	Attendance	Ref.
November 11	12:00 p.m.	**Arkansas**	No. 24 **LSU**	Tiger Stadium • Baton Rouge, LA (rivalry)	ESPN	**LSU** 33–10	98,546	
November 11	12:00 p.m.	Louisiana	**Ole Miss**	Vaught-Hemingway Stadium • Oxford, MS	SECN	**W** 50–22	51,618	
November 11	12:00 p.m.	**Florida**	**South Carolina**	Williams-Brice Stadium • Columbia, SC	CBS	**SCAR** 28–20	79,727	
November 11	3:30 p.m.	No. 1 **Georgia**	No. 10 **Auburn**	Jordan-Hare Stadium • Auburn, AL (rivalry)	CBS	**AUB** 40–17	87,451	
November 11	4:00 p.m.	**Kentucky**	**Vanderbilt**	Vanderbilt Stadium • Nashville, TN (rivalry)	SECN	**UK** 44–21	27,346	
November 11	7:00 p.m.	No. 2 **Alabama**	No. 16 **Mississippi State**	Davis Wade Stadium • Starkville, MS (rivalry)	ESPN	**ALA** 31–24	61,344	
November 11	7:00 p.m.	New Mexico	**Texas A&M**	Kyle Field • College Station, TX	ESPNU	**W** 55–14	99,051	
November 11	7:30 p.m.	**Tennessee**	**Missouri**	Faurot Field • Columbia, MO	SECN	**MIZZOU** 50–17	50,637	
^{#}Rankings from College Football Playoff. All times are in Eastern Time.

==== Week Twelve ====
Date	Time	Visiting team	Home team	Site	TV	Result	Attendance	Ref.
November 18	12:00 p.m.	No. 16 **Mississippi State**	**Arkansas**	Razorback Stadium • Fayetteville, AR	CBS	**MISS ST** 28–21	64,153	
November 18	12:00 p.m.	Mercer	No. 1 **Alabama**	Bryant-Denny Stadium • Tuscaloosa, AL	SECN	**W** 56–0	101,821	
November 18	12:00 p.m.	Louisiana–Monroe	No. 6 **Auburn**	Jordan–Hare Stadium • Auburn, AL	ESPN2	**W** 42–14	82,133	
November 18	3:30 p.m.	**Kentucky**	No. 7 **Georgia**	Sanford Stadium • Athens, GA	CBS	**UGA** 42–13	92,746	
November 18	4:00 p.m.	UAB	**Florida**	Ben Hill Griffin Stadium • Gainesville, FL	SECN	**W** 36–7	84,649	
November 18	4:00 p.m.	Wofford	**South Carolina**	Williams-Brice Stadium • Columbia, SC	SECN	**W** 31–10	74,742	
November 18	7:00 p.m.	No. 20 **LSU**	**Tennessee**	Neyland Stadium • Knoxville, TN	ESPN	**LSU** 30–10	96,888	
November 18	7:00 p.m.	**Texas A&M**	**Ole Miss**	Vaught-Hemingway Stadium • Oxford, MS	ESPN2	**TAMU** 31–24	55,880	
November 18	7:30 p.m.	**Missouri**	**Vanderbilt**	Vanderbilt Stadium • Nashville, TN	SECN	**MIZZOU** 45–17	22,910	
^{#}Rankings from College Football Playoff. All times are in Eastern Time.

==== Week Thirteen ====
Date	Time	Visiting team	Home team	Site	TV	Result	Attendance	Ref.
November 23	7:30 p.m.	**Ole Miss**	No. 14 **Mississippi State**	Davis Wade Stadium • Starkville, MS (rivalry)	ESPN	**MISS** 31–28	59,345	
November 24	2:30 p.m.	**Missouri**	**Arkansas**	Razorback Stadium • Fayetteville, AR (rivalry)	CBS	**MIZZOU** 48–45	64,529	
November 25	12:00 p.m.	No. 7 **Georgia**	Georgia Tech	Bobby Dodd Stadium • Atlanta, GA (rivalry)	ABC	**W** 38–7	55,000	
November 25	12:00 p.m.	Louisville	**Kentucky**	Kroger Field • Lexington, KY (Governor's Cup)	SECN	**L** 17–44	56,186	
November 25	12:00 p.m.	Florida State	**Florida**	Ben Hill Griffin Stadium • Gainesville, FL (rivalry)	ESPN	**L** 22–38	89,066	
November 25	3:30 p.m.	No. 1 **Alabama**	No. 6 **Auburn**	Jordan-Hare Stadium • Auburn, AL (rivalry)	CBS	**AUB** 26–14	87,451	
November 25	4:00 p.m.	**Vanderbilt**	**Tennessee**	Neyland Stadium • Knoxville, TN (rivalry)	SECN	**VANDY** 42–24	83,117	
November 25	7:30 p.m.	No. 3 Clemson	No. 24 **South Carolina**	Williams-Brice Stadium • Columbia, SC (Palmetto Bowl)	ESPN	**L** 10–34	82,908	
November 25	7:30 p.m.	**Texas A&M**	No. 18 **LSU**	Tiger Stadium • Baton Rouge, LA (rivalry)	SECN	**LSU** 45–21	97,675	
^{#}Rankings from College Football Playoff. All times are in Eastern Time.

=== Championship game ===
Date	Time	Visiting team	Home team	Site	TV	Result	Attendance	Ref.
December 2	4:00 p.m.	No. 6 **Georgia**	No. 2 **Auburn**	Mercedes-Benz Stadium • Atlanta, GA (rivalry)	CBS	**UGA** 28–7	76,534	
^{#}Rankings from College Football Playoff. All times are in Eastern Time.

== SEC vs other conferences ==
=== SEC vs. Power 5 matchups ===
This is a list of teams considered by the SEC as "Power Five" teams for purposes of meeting league requirements that each member play at least one "power" team in non-conference play. In addition to the SEC, the NCAA officially considers all football members of the ACC, Big 10, Big 12 and Pac-12, plus independent Notre Dame (a full but non-football ACC member), as "Power Five" teams. Although the NCAA does not consider BYU a "Power Five" school, the SEC considers games against BYU as satisfying its "Power Five" scheduling requirement.

All rankings are from the current AP Poll at the time of the game.

Date	Visitor	Home	Site	Significance	Score
September 2	NC State	South Carolina	Bank of America Stadium • Charlotte, NC	Belk Kickoff Game	W 35–28
September 2	#11 Michigan	#17 Florida	AT&T Stadium • Arlington, TX	Advocare Classic	L 17–33
September 2	#1 Alabama	#3 Florida State	Mercedes-Benz Stadium • Atlanta, GA	Chick-fil-A Kickoff Game	W 24–7
September 2	BYU	#13 LSU	Mercedes-Benz Superdome • New Orleans, LA	Texas Kickoff	W 27–0
September 3	Texas A&M	UCLA	Rose Bowl • Pasadena, CA		L 44–45
September 4	#25 Tennessee	Georgia Tech	Mercedes-Benz Stadium • Atlanta, GA	Chick-fil-A Kickoff Game / Georgia Tech–Tennessee football rivalry	W 42–41 ^{2OT}
September 9	#23 TCU	Arkansas	Donald W. Reynolds Razorback Stadium • Fayetteville, AR		L 7–28
September 9	#13 Auburn	#3 Clemson	Memorial Stadium • Clemson, SC	Auburn–Clemson football rivalry	L 6–14
September 9	#15 Georgia	#24 Notre Dame	Notre Dame Stadium • South Bend, IN		W 20–19
September 16	Purdue	Missouri	Faurot Field • Columbia, MO		L 3–35
September 16	#18 Kansas State	Vanderbilt	Vanderbilt Stadium • Nashville, TN		W 14–7
September 16	Ole Miss	California	California Memorial Stadium • Berkeley, CA		L 16–27
September 23	Syracuse	#25 LSU	Tiger Stadium • Baton Rouge, LA		W 35–26
October 14	BYU	Mississippi State	Davis Wade Stadium • Starkville, MS		W 35–10
November 25	#7 Georgia	Georgia Tech	Bobby Dodd Stadium • Atlanta, GA	Clean, Old-Fashioned Hate	W 38–7
November 25	Louisville	Kentucky	Kroger Field • Lexington, KY	Governor's Cup	L 17–44
November 25	#4 Clemson	South Carolina	Williams-Brice Stadium • Columbia, SC	Battle of the Palmetto State	L 10–34
November 25	Florida State	Florida	Ben Hill Griffin Stadium • Gainesville, FL	Florida–Florida State football rivalry	L 22–38

=== Records against other conferences ===
Regular Season

Power 5 Conferences	Record
ACC	5–4
Big Ten	0–2
Big 12	1–1
BYU/Notre Dame	3–0
Pac-12	0–2
Power 5 Total	9–9
Other FBS Conferences	Record
American	1–0
C-USA	7–0
Independents (Excluding BYU & Notre Dame)	2–0
MAC	1–0
Mountain West	2–0
Sun Belt	10–1
Other FBS Total	23–1
FCS Opponents	Record
Football Championship Subdivision	13–0
Total Non-Conference Record	45–10

Post Season

Power Conferences 5	Record
ACC	2–1
Big Ten	1–1
Big 12	1–1
Notre Dame	0–1
Power 5 Total	4–4
Other FBS Conferences	Record
American	0–1
Other FBS Total	0–1
Total Bowl Record	4–5

== Postseason ==
=== Bowl games ===
(Rankings from final CFP Poll; All times Eastern)

Date	Time	Bowl Game	Site	TV	SEC Team	Opponent	Result
January 8, 2018	8:00 p.m.	CFP National Championship	Mercedes-Benz Stadium • Atlanta, GA (rivalry)	ESPN	#4 Alabama (12–1)	#3 Georgia (13–1)	ALA 26–23 (OT)
January 1, 2018	8:45 p.m.	Sugar Bowl (CFP Semifinal)	Mercedes-Benz Superdome • New Orleans, LA (rivalry)	ESPN	#4 Alabama (11–1)	#1 Clemson (12–1)	W 24–6
January 1, 2018	5:00 p.m.	Rose Bowl (CFP Semifinal)	Rose Bowl • Pasadena, CA	ESPN	#3 Georgia (12–1)	#2 Oklahoma (12–1)	W 54–48 (2OT)
January 1, 2018	1:00 p.m.	Peach Bowl (New Year's Six)	Mercedes-Benz Stadium • Atlanta, GA	ESPN	#7 Auburn (10–3)	#12 UCF (12–0)	L 27–34
January 1, 2018	1:00 p.m.	Citrus Bowl	Camping World Stadium • Orlando, FL	ABC	#17 LSU (9–3)	#14 Notre Dame (9–3)	L 17–21
January 1, 2018	12:00 p.m.	Outback Bowl	Raymond James Stadium • Tampa, FL	ESPN2	South Carolina (8–4)	Michigan (8–4)	W 26–19
December 30, 2017	12:00 p.m.	TaxSlayer Bowl	EverBank Field • Jacksonville, FL	ESPN	#23 Mississippi State (8–4)	Louisville (8–4)	W 31–27
December 29, 2017	4:30 p.m.	Music City Bowl	Nissan Stadium • Nashville, TN	ESPN	Kentucky (7–5)	#21 Northwestern (9–3)	L 23–24
December 29, 2017	1:00 p.m.	Belk Bowl	Bank of America Stadium • Charlotte, NC	ESPN	Texas A&M (7–5)	Wake Forest (7–5)	L 52–55
December 27, 2017	9:00 p.m.	Texas Bowl	NRG Stadium • Houston, TX	ESPN	Missouri (7–5)	Texas (6–6)	L 16–33

== Awards and honors ==
=== Player of the week honors ===
Week	Offensive			Offensive Lineman			Defensive			Defensive Lineman			Special teams			Freshman		
Week	Player	Position	Team	Player	Position	Team	Player	Position	Team	Player	Position	Team	Player	Position	Team	Player	Position	Team
Week 1 (Sept. 2)	Drew Lock	QB	Missouri	Garrett Brumfield	OG	LSU	Shaun Dion Hamilton	LB	Alabama	Denzil Ware	DE/LB	Kentucky	Deebo Samuel	WR/KR	South Carolina	Chase Hayden	RB	Arkansas
Week 2 (Sept. 9)	Shea Patterson	QB	Ole Miss	Matt Womack	OL	Alabama	Lorenzo Carter	LB	Georgia	Jeffery Simmons	DL	Mississippi State	Deebo Samuel (2)	WR/KR	South Carolina	Ty Chandler	RB/KR	Tennessee
Week 3 (Sept. 16)	Nick Fitzgerald	QB	Mississippi State	Darryl Williams	OL	Mississippi State	Derrick Baity Jr. LaDarius Wiley	CB; S	Kentucky; Vanderbilt	Jeffery Simmons (2)	DL	Mississippi State	Austin MacGinnis	PK	Kentucky	C. J. Henderson	DB	Florida
Week 4 (Sept. 23)	Damien Harris	RB	Alabama	Ross Pierschbacher	OL	Alabama	CeCe Jefferson	DE	Florida	Christian Kirk	WR/KR	Texas A&M	Marlon Davidson	DL	Auburn	Jake Fromm	QB	Georgia
Week 5 (Sept. 30)	Jarrett Stidham; Nick Chubb	QB; RB	Auburn; Georgia	Brett Heggie	OL	Florida	Levi Wallace	DL	Alabama	Landis Durham	DL	Texas A&M	Joshua Pascal	LB	Kentucky	Malik Davis; Nick Coe	RB; DL	Florida; Auburn
Week 6 (Oct. 7)	Kerryon Johnson	RB	Auburn	Isaiah Wynn	LT	Georgia	Minkah Fitzpatrick; Devin White	DB; DE/LB	Alabama; LSU	D.J. Wonnum	DL	South Carolina	Daniel Carlson	PK	Auburn	Lynn Bowden	WR/KR	Kentucky
Week 7 (Oct. 14)	D.J. Chark; Shea Patterson (2)	WR/PR; QB	LSU; Ole Miss	Jonah Williams	OL	Alabama	Devin White (2)	LB	LSU	D.J. Wonnum (2)	DL	South Carolina	Daniel LeCamera	PK	Texas A&M	Jake Fromm (2)	QB	Georgia
Week 8 (Oct. 21)	Derrius Guice	RB	LSU	Deion Calhoun	RG	Mississippi State	Levi Wallace (2); Jeff Holland	DB; DE	Alabama; Auburn	Montez Sweat	DE	Mississippi State	Connor Culp	PK	LSU	Nick Coe; Albert Okwuegbunam	DL; TE	Auburn; Missouri
Week 9 (Oct. 28)	Nick Fitzgerald (2); Benny Snell	QB; RB	Mississippi State; Kentucky	Alan Knott	C	South Carolina	Jordan Jones; J.R. Reed	LB; DB	Kentucky; Georgia	Montez Sweat (2)	DE	Mississippi State	De’Vion Warren	WR/KR	Arkansas	Cole Kelley	QB	Arkansas
Week 10 (Nov. 4)	Jordan Ta'amu	QB	Ole Miss	Braden Smith	RG	Auburn	Ronnie Harrison; Anthony Sherrils	DB; S	Alabama; Missouri	Josiah Coatney	DL	Ole Miss	J. K. Scott	P	Alabama	DK Metcalf; Aidan Marshall	WR; P	Ole Miss; Missouri
Week 11 (Nov. 11)	Kerryon Johnson (2)	RB	Auburn	Casey Dunn	C	Auburn	Devin White (3)	LB	LSU	Denzil Ware (2) Marcell Frazier	DE/LB; DL	Kentucky; Missouri	Daniel Carlson (2)	PK	Auburn	Nick Starkel; Larry Roundtree III	QB; RB	Texas A&M; Missouri
Week 12 (Nov. 18)	Nick Chubb (2)	RB	Georgia	JC Hassenauer	OL	Alabama	Derrick Tucker	S	Texas A&M	Montez Sweat (3)	DL	Mississippi State	Zach Von Rosenberg	P	LSU	Albert Okwuegbunam (2)	TE	Missouri
Week 13 (Nov. 25)	Drew Lock (2); Jarrett Stidham (2)	QB	Missouri; Auburn	Greg Little; Bruno Reagan	OL	Ole Miss; Vanderbilt	Devin White (4)	LB	LSU	Nick Coe	DL	Auburn	Gary Wunderlich	PK	Ole Miss	Jake Fromm (3)	QB	Georgia

=== SEC Individual Awards ===
The following individuals won the conference's annual player and coach awards:

- Offensive Player of the Year: Kerryon Johnson, Auburn
- Defensive Player of the Year: Roquan Smith, Georgia
- Coach of the Year: Kirby Smart, Georgia
- Special Teams Player of the Year: Daniel Carlson, Auburn
- Freshman Player of the Year: Jake Fromm, Georgia
- Newcomer Player of the Year: Jarrett Stidham, Auburn
- Jacobs Blocking Trophy: Braden Smith, Auburn
- Scholar-Athlete Player of the Year: Danny Etling, LSU

=== All-Conference teams ===
==== Coaches ====
Position	1st Team		2nd Team	
Position	Player	School	Player	School
QB	Drew Lock	Missouri	Jarrett Stidham	Auburn
RB	Kerryon Johnson	Auburn	Benny Snell	Kentucky
RB	Nick Chubb	Georgia	Derrius Guice	LSU
WR	A. J. Brown	Ole Miss	J'Mon Moore	Missouri
WR	Calvin Ridley	Alabama	Christian Kirk	Texas A&M
TE	Hayden Hurst	South Carolina	Albert Okwuegbunam	Missouri
C	Will Clapp	LSU	Bradley Bozeman	Alabama
OL	Isaiah Wynn	Georgia	Trey Smith	Tennessee
OL	Braden Smith	Auburn	Garrett Brumfield	LSU
OL	Martinas Rankin	Mississippi State	Martez Ivey	Florida
OL	Jonah Williams	Alabama	Greg Little	Ole Miss
RS	Christian Kirk	Texas A&M	D. J. Chark	LSU
DL	Jeff Holland	Auburn	Daron Payne	Alabama
DL	Montez Sweat	Mississippi State	Marcell Frazier	Missouri
DL	Raekwon Davis	Alabama	Da'Shawn Hand	Alabama
DL	Jeffery Simmons	Mississippi State	Marquis Haynes	Ole Miss
LB	Roquan Smith	Georgia	Rashaan Evans	Alabama
LB	Devin White	LSU	Lorenzo Carter	Georgia
LB	Skai Moore	South Carolina	Tre' Williams	Auburn
DB	Minkah Fitzpatrick	Alabama	Ronnie Harrison	Alabama
DB	Duke Dawson	Florida	Donte Jackson	LSU
DB	Armani Watts	Texas A&M	Andraez Williams	LSU
DB	Carlton Davis	Auburn	Deandre Baker	Georgia
PK	Daniel Carlson	Auburn	Eddy Piñeiro	Florida
P	J. K. Scott	Alabama	Johnny Townsend	Florida

==== Media ====
Position	1st Team		2nd Team	
Position	Player	School	Player	School
QB	Drew Lock	Missouri	Jarrett Stidham	Auburn
RB	Kerryon Johnson	Auburn	Nick Chubb	Georgia
RB	Benny Snell	Kentucky	Derrius Guice	LSU
WR	A. J. Brown	Ole Miss	J'Mon Moore	Missouri
WR	Calvin Ridley	Alabama	Christian Kirk	Texas A&M
TE	Hayden Hurst	South Carolina	Albert Okwuegbunam	Missouri
C	Bradley Bozeman; Will Clapp	Alabama; LSU	Frank Ragnow	Arkansas
OG	Braden Smith	Auburn	Trey Smith	Tennessee
OG	Ross Pierschbacher	Alabama	Greg Little	Ole Miss
OT	Jonah Williams	Alabama	Martinas Rankin	Mississippi State
OT	Isaiah Wynn	Georgia	Martez Ivey	Florida
AP	Christian Kirk	Texas A&M	Mecole Hardman; D. J. Chark	Georgia; LSU
DL	Jeff Holland	Auburn	Marcell Frazier	Missouri
DL	Montez Sweat	Mississippi State	Marquis Haynes; Dante Sawyer	Ole Miss; South Carolina
DL	Daron Payne	Alabama	Taven Bryan	Florida
DL	Jeffery Simmons	Mississippi State	Raekwon Davis; Breeland Speaks	Alabama; Ole Miss
LB	Roquan Smith	Georgia	Josh Allen	Kentucky
LB	Devin White	LSU	Lorenzo Carter; De'Jon Harris	Georgia; Arkansas
LB	Rashaan Evans; Arden Key	Alabama; LSU	Skai Moore; Charles Wright	South Carolina; Vanderbilt
DB	Andraez Williams	LSU	Duke Dawson	Florida
DB	Armani Watts	Texas A&M	Levi Wallace	Alabama
DB	Minkah Fitzpatrick	Alabama	Carlton Davis	Auburn
DB	Ronnie Harrison	Alabama	C. J. Henderson; J. R. Reed	Florida; Georgia
PK	Daniel Carlson	Auburn	Eddy Piñeiro	Florida
P	Johnny Townsend	Florida	J. K. Scott	Alabama

=== All-Americans ===
- **OL** – Braden Smith, Auburn (**AP**, ESPN, CBS)
- **OL** – Frank Ragnow, Arkansas (CBS)
- **LB** – Jeff Holland, Auburn (SI)
- **LB** – Roquan Smith, Georgia (**AP, AFCA, FWAA, WCFF, TSN**, SI, USAT, ESPN, CBS, CFN)
- **LB** – Rashaan Evans, Alabama (**AFCA**)
- **DB** – Carlton Davis, Auburn (SI)
- **DB** – Minkah Fitzpatrick, Alabama (**AP, AFCA, FWAA, WCFF**, **TSN**, SI, USAT, ESPN, CBS, CFN)
- **PK** – Daniel Carlson, Auburn (**AFCA**, **WCFF**, CBS)
- **P** – Johnny Townsend, Florida (SI)
- **P** – J. K. Scott, Alabama (CFN)

=== National Award Finalists ===
Winners in bold

- Manning Award (quarterback) – Jalen Hurts, Alabama; Jarrett Stidham, Auburn
- Bednarik Award (best defensive player) – **Minkah Fitzpatrick, Alabama**; Roquan Smith, Georgia
- Bronko Nagurski Award (best defensive player) – Minkah Fitzpatrick, Alabama; Roquan Smith, Georgia
- Butkus Award (best linebacker) – **Roquan Smith, Georgia**
- Jim Thorpe Award (best defensive back) – **Minkah Fitzpatrick, Alabama**
- Wuerffel Trophy (humanitarian–athlete) – **Courtney Love, Kentucky**
- Lou Groza Award (best kicker) – Daniel Carlson, Auburn
- Ray Guy Award (best punter) – J. K. Scott, Alabama
- AP Coach of the Year – Kirby Smart, Georgia

== Home game attendance ==
Team	Stadium	Capacity	Game 1	Game 2	Game 3	Game 4	Game 5	Game 6	Game 7	Total	Average	% of Capacity
Alabama	Bryant–Denny Stadium	101,821	101,127	101,821	101,821	101,821	101,821	101,821	101,821	712,053	101,722	99.90%
Arkansas	Razorback Stadium	72,000	36,055^{A}	73,668	70,727	71,961	61,476	64,153	64,529	378,416	62,905	81.84%
Auburn	Jordan–Hare Stadium	87,451	87,451	87,033	86,901	86,700	87,451	82,133	87,451	605,120	86,446	98.85%
Florida	Ben Hill Griffin Stadium	88,548	87,736	84,478	88,247	86,114	84,649	89,066	–	520,290	86,715	97.93%
Georgia	Sanford Stadium	92,746	92,746	92,746	92,746	92,746	92,746	92,746	–	556,476	92,746	100%
Kentucky	Kroger Field	61,000	54,868	62,945	50,593	57,476	57,543	55,665	56,186	395,276	56,468	92.57%
LSU	Tiger Stadium	102,321	97,289	96,044	99,879	101,601	98,546	97,675	–	591,034	98,506	96.27%
Mississippi State	Davis Wade Stadium	61,337	54,215	60,596	54,866	58,963	57,374	61,344	59,345	406,703	58,100	94.72%
Missouri	Faurot Field	71,168	50,131	55,023	53,262	54,574	47,648	49,154	50,637	360,429	51,490	72.35%
Ole Miss	Vaught–Hemingway Stadium	64,038	62,532	60,476	60,157	64,067	55,684	51,618	55,880	410,414	58,631	91.56%
South Carolina	Williams-Brice Stadium	80,250	82,493	71,821	79,416	78,992	79,727	74,742	82,908	550,099	78,586	97.93%
Tennessee	Neyland Stadium	102,455	99,015	95,324	102,455	98,104	95,551	96,888	83,117	670,454	95,779	93.48%
Texas A&M	Kyle Field	102,733	100,276	98,412	96,430	101,058	96,128	100,257	99,051	691,612	98,802	96.17%
Vanderbilt	Vanderbilt Stadium	40,550	25,802	40,350	40,350	36,282	26,350	27,346	22,910	219,390	31,341	77.29%

^AGame played at Arkansas' secondary home stadium War Memorial Stadium, capacity: 54,120.
