= 2017 Arkansas Razorbacks football team =

American college football season

2017 Arkansas Razorbacks football
- Conference: Southeastern Conference
- Western Division
- Record: 4–8 (1–7 SEC)
- Head coach: Bret Bielema (5th season)
- Offensive coordinator: Dan Enos (3rd season)
- Offensive scheme: Pro-style
- Defensive coordinator: Paul Rhoads (1st season)
- Base defense: 4–3
- Captains: Austin Allen; Kevin Richardson II; Kody Walker; Frank Ragnow
- Home stadium: Donald W. Reynolds Razorback Stadium; War Memorial Stadium

2017 Southeastern Conference football standings
| | Conf. | | | Overall |
| Team | W | | L | W | | L |
|---|---|---|---|---|---|---|
Eastern Division
| No. 2 Georgia x$^ | 7 | – | 1 | 13 | – | 2 |
| South Carolina | 5 | – | 3 | 9 | – | 4 |
| Kentucky | 4 | – | 4 | 7 | – | 6 |
| Missouri | 4 | – | 4 | 7 | – | 6 |
| Florida | 3 | – | 5 | 4 | – | 7 |
| Vanderbilt | 1 | – | 7 | 5 | – | 7 |
| Tennessee | 0 | – | 8 | 4 | – | 8 |
Western Division
| No. 10 Auburn xy | 7 | – | 1 | 10 | – | 4 |
| No. 1 Alabama x#^ | 7 | – | 1 | 13 | – | 1 |
| No. 18 LSU | 6 | – | 2 | 9 | – | 4 |
| No. 19 Mississippi State | 4 | – | 4 | 9 | – | 4 |
| Texas A&M | 4 | – | 4 | 7 | – | 6 |
| Ole Miss* | 3 | – | 5 | 6 | – | 6 |
| Arkansas | 1 | – | 7 | 4 | – | 8 |
Championship: Georgia 28, Auburn 7
# – College Football Playoff champion; ^ – College Football Playoff participant; $ – Conference champion; x – Division champion/co-champions; y – Championship game participant; * Ole Miss ineligible for postseason due to NCAA sanctions; Rankings from AP Poll

The 2017 Arkansas Razorbacks football team represented the University of Arkansas as a member of the Southeastern Conference (SEC) during the 2017 NCAA Division I FBS football season. Led by Bret Bielema in his fifth and final season as head coach, the Razorbacks compiled an overall record of 4–8 with a mark of 1–7 in conference play, placing last out of seven teams in the SEC's Western Division. The team played six home games at Donald W. Reynolds Razorback Stadium in Fayetteville, Arkansas and one home game at War Memorial Stadium in Little Rock, Arkansas.

Arkansas was captained by quarterback Austin Allen, defensive backs Santos Ramirez and Kevin Richardson II, and offensive lineman Frank Ragnow. Bielema was fired after the final game of the season.

== Schedule ==
Arkansas' 2017 schedule consisted of seven home games, four away games, and one neutral game in the regular season. The Razorbacks opened their season on a Thursday night for the first time since 2001.

| Date | Time | Opponent | Site | TV | Result | Attendance |
|---|---|---|---|---|---|---|
| August 31 | 7:00 p.m. | Florida A&M* | War Memorial Stadium; Little Rock, AR | SECN | W 49–7 | 36,055 |
| September 9 | 2:30 p.m. | No. 23 TCU* | Donald W. Reynolds Razorback Stadium; Fayetteville, AR | CBS | L 7–28 | 73,668 |
| September 23 | 11:00 a.m. | vs. Texas A&M | AT&T Stadium; Arlington, TX (rivalry) | ESPN | L 43–50 ^{OT} | 64,668 |
| September 30 | 11:00 a.m. | New Mexico State* | Donald W. Reynolds Razorback Stadium; Fayetteville, AR | SECN | W 42–24 | 70,727 |
| October 7 | 3:00 p.m. | at South Carolina | Williams–Brice Stadium; Columbia, SC | SECN | L 22–48 | 79,416 |
| October 14 | 6:15 p.m. | at No. 1 Alabama | Bryant–Denny Stadium; Tuscaloosa, AL | ESPN | L 9–41 | 101,821 |
| October 21 | 6:30 p.m. | No. 21 Auburn | Donald W. Reynolds Razorback Stadium; Fayetteville, AR | SECN | L 20–52 | 71,961 |
| October 28 | 11:00 a.m. | at Ole Miss | Vaught–Hemingway Stadium; Oxford, MS (rivalry) | SECN | W 38–37 | 55,684 |
| November 4 | 3:00 p.m. | Coastal Carolina*^{†} | Donald W. Reynolds Razorback Stadium; Fayetteville, AR | SECN | W 39–38 | 61,476 |
| November 11 | 11:00 a.m. | at No. 24 LSU | Tiger Stadium; Baton Rouge, LA (rivalry) | ESPN | L 10–33 | 98,546 |
| November 18 | 11:00 a.m. | No. 16 Mississippi State | Donald W. Reynolds Razorback Stadium; Fayetteville, AR | CBS | L 21–28 | 64,153 |
| November 24 | 1:30 p.m. | Missouri | Donald W. Reynolds Razorback Stadium; Fayetteville, AR (Battle Line Rivalry) | CBS | L 45–48 | 64,529 |
*Non-conference game; ^{†}Homecoming; Rankings from AP Poll released prior to the game; All times are in Central time

== Game summaries ==
=== Florida A&M ===
Florida A&M Rattlers at Arkansas Razorbacks

| Quarter | 1 | 2 | 3 | 4 | Total |
|---|---|---|---|---|---|
| Rattlers | 0 | 0 | 0 | 7 | 7 |
| Razorbacks | 7 | 14 | 14 | 14 | 49 |

at War Memorial Stadium • Little Rock, Arkansas

- Date: August 31, 2017
- Game time: 7:00 p.m. CT
- Game weather: Cloudy • Temp: 74°F • Wind: NNW 12 mph
- Game attendance: 36,055
- Referee: Lee Hedrick
- TV announcers (SEC Network): Tom Hart (play-by-play), Jordan Rodgers (color), Cole Cubelic (sideline)
- ESPN Box Score • UofA Box Score

Scoring summary

| Quarter | Time | Drive | | | Team | Scoring information | Score | |
| Quarter | Time | Plays | Yards | TOP | Team | Scoring information | FAMU | ARK |
|---|---|---|---|---|---|---|---|---|
| 1 | 1:15 | 11 | 64 | 5:58 | ARK | Devwah Whaley 5-yard touchdown run, Cole Hedlund kick good | 0 | 7 |
| 2 | 7:54 | 4 | 48 | 1:59 | ARK | Deon Stewart 16-yard touchdown reception from Austin Allen, Cole Hedlund kick good | 0 | 14 |
| 2 | 1:21 | 9 | 63 | 4:32 | ARK | David Williams 4-yard touchdown run, Cole Hedlund kick good | 0 | 21 |
| 3 | 13:57 | | | | ARK | Fumble recovery returned 18 yards for touchdown by Henre' Toliver, Cole Hedlund kick good | 0 | 28 |
| 3 | 8:46 | 7 | 56 | 3:02 | ARK | Chase Hayden 5-yard touchdown run, Cole Hedlund kick good | 0 | 35 |
| 4 | 14:57 | 10 | 71 | 4:57 | ARK | David Williams 1-yard touchdown run, Cole Hedlund kick good | 0 | 42 |
| 4 | 8:23 | 15 | 76 | 6:34 | FAMU | Brandon Norwood 7-yard touchdown reception from Vincent Jeffries, Yahia Aly kick good | 7 | 42 |
| 4 | 2:20 | 10 | 75 | 6:03 | ARK | Cheyenne O'Grady 7-yard touchdown reception from Cole Kelley, Cole Hedlund kick good | 7 | 49 |
| "TOP" = time of possession. For other American football terms, see Glossary of American football. | | | | | | | 7 | 49 |

| Statistics | FAMU | ARK |
|---|---|---|
| First downs | 9 | 26 |
| Total yards | 175 | 415 |
| Rushes–yards | 31–80 | 45–236 |
| Passing yards | 95 | 179 |
| Passing: Comp–Att–Int | 16–22–1 | 14–29–1 |
| Time of possession | 25:30 | 34:30 |

| Team | Category | Player | Statistics |
|---|---|---|---|
| Florida A&M | Passing | Vince Jeffries | 14/27, 95 yds, 1 TD |
| Florida A&M | Rushing | Ricky Henrilus | 11 car, 30 yds |
| Florida A&M | Receiving | Brandon Norwood | 6 rec, 54 yds, 1 TD |
| Arkansas | Passing | Austin Allen | 14/19, 135 yds, 1 TD, 1 INT |
| Arkansas | Rushing | Chase Hayden | 14 car, 120 yds, 1 TD |
| Arkansas | Receiving | Jonathan Nance | 3 rec, 25 yds |

=== No. 23 TCU ===
No. 23 TCU Horned Frogs at Arkansas Razorbacks

| Quarter | 1 | 2 | 3 | 4 | Total |
|---|---|---|---|---|---|
| No. 23 Horned Frogs | 7 | 7 | 0 | 14 | 28 |
| Razorbacks | 7 | 0 | 0 | 0 | 7 |

at Donald W. Reynolds Razorback Stadium • Fayetteville, Arkansas

- Date: September 9, 2017
- Game time: 2:30 p.m. CT
- Game weather: Partly cloudy • Temp: 82°F • Wind: E 10 mph
- Game attendance: 73,668
- Referee: Reggie Smith
- TV announcers (CBS): Brad Nessler (play-by-play), Gary Danielson (color), Allie LaForce (sideline)
- ESPN Box Score • UofA Box Score

Scoring summary

| Quarter | Time | Drive | | | Team | Scoring information | Score | |
| Quarter | Time | Plays | Yards | TOP | Team | Scoring information | TCU | ARK |
|---|---|---|---|---|---|---|---|---|
| 1 | 10:43 | 8 | 45 | 2:42 | TCU | Sewo Olonilua 1-yard touchdown run, Jonathan Song kick good | 7 | 0 |
| 1 | 8:15 | 6 | 75 | 2:28 | ARK | Jonathan Nance 49-yard touchdown reception from Austin Allen, Cole Hedlund kick good | 7 | 7 |
| 2 | 7:39 | 15 | 80 | 7:17 | TCU | Kyle Hicks 4-yard touchdown run, Jonathan Song kick good | 14 | 7 |
| 4 | 2:18 | 7 | 55 | 4:29 | TCU | Darius Anderson 14-yard touchdown run, Jonathan Song kick good | 21 | 7 |
| 4 | 2:04 | 1 | 13 | 0:14 | TCU | Sewo Olonilua 13-yard touchdown run, Jonathan Song kick good | 28 | 7 |
| "TOP" = time of possession. For other American football terms, see Glossary of American football. | | | | | | | 28 | 7 |

| Statistics | TCU | ARK |
|---|---|---|
| First downs | 24 | 13 |
| Total yards | 361 | 267 |
| Rushes–yards | 42–195 | 31–129 |
| Passing yards | 166 | 138 |
| Passing: Comp–Att–Int | 21–31–1 | 9–23–0 |
| Time of possession | 33:52 | 26:08 |

| Team | Category | Player | Statistics |
|---|---|---|---|
| TCU | Passing | Kenny Hill | 21/31, 166 yds, 1 INT |
| TCU | Rushing | Darius Anderson | 15 car, 106 yds, 1 TD |
| TCU | Receiving | Desmon White | 5 rec, 33 yds |
| Arkansas | Passing | Austin Allen | 9/23, 138 yds, 1 TD |
| Arkansas | Rushing | David Williams | 10 car, 65 yds |
| Arkansas | Receiving | Jonathan Nance | 3 rec, 75 yds, 1 TD |

=== vs Texas A&M ===
Arkansas Razorbacks vs Texas A&M Aggies (74th Southwest Classic)

| Quarter | 1 | 2 | 3 | 4 | OT | Total |
|---|---|---|---|---|---|---|
| Razorbacks | 7 | 14 | 7 | 15 | 0 | 43 |
| Aggies | 7 | 10 | 7 | 19 | 7 | 50 |

at AT&T Stadium • Arlington, Texas

- Date: September 23, 2017
- Game time: 11:00 a.m. CT
- Game weather: N/A (Game played indoors)
- Game attendance: 64,668
- Referee: John McDaid
- TV announcers (ESPN): Bob Wischusen (play-by-play), Brock Huard (color), Allison Williams (sideline)
- ESPN Box Score • UofA Box Score

Scoring summary

| Quarter | Time | Drive | | | Team | Scoring information | Score | |
| Quarter | Time | Plays | Yards | TOP | Team | Scoring information | A&M | ARK |
|---|---|---|---|---|---|---|---|---|
| 1 | 9:04 | 7 | 65 | 3:27 | ARK | Jared Cornelius 6-yard touchdown reception from Austin Allen, Connor Limpert kick good | 0 | 7 |
| 1 | 8:02 | 3 | 85 | 1:02 | A&M | Christian Kirk 81-yard touchdown reception from Kellen Mond, Daniel LaCamera kick good | 7 | 7 |
| 2 | 14:54 | 11 | 82 | 5:25 | ARK | David Williams 2-yard touchdown reception from Cole Kelley, Connor Limpert kick good | 7 | 14 |
| 2 | 10:21 | 2 | 30 | 0:31 | ARK | Chase Hayden 6-yard touchdown run, Connor Limpert kick good | 7 | 21 |
| 2 | 8:03 | 5 | 79 | 2:18 | A&M | 27-yard field goal by Daniel LaCamera | 10 | 21 |
| 2 | 1:57 | 6 | 82 | 2:14 | A&M | Trayveon Williams 18-yard touchdown run, Daniel LaCamera kick good | 17 | 21 |
| 3 | 8:48 | 9 | 71 | 3:37 | A&M | Keith Ford 23-yard touchdown run, Daniel LaCamera kick good | 24 | 21 |
| 3 | 1:53 | 6 | 71 | 2:11 | ARK | David Williams 1-yard touchdown run, Connor Limpert kick good | 24 | 28 |
| 4 | 11:40 | 13 | 56 | 5:13 | A&M | 37-yard field goal by Daniel LaCamera | 27 | 28 |
| 4 | 8:46 | 3 | 53 | 0:47 | A&M | Keith Ford 44-yard touchdown run, 2-point run failed | 33 | 28 |
| 4 | 5:21 | 7 | 79 | 3:25 | ARK | Jonathan Nance 44-yard touchdown reception from Austin Allen, 2-point pass good | 33 | 36 |
| 4 | 5:10 | | | | A&M | Kickoff returned 100 yards for touchdown by Christian Kirk, Daniel LaCamera kick good | 40 | 36 |
| 4 | 3:39 | 4 | 75 | 1:31 | ARK | David Williams 4-yard touchdown run, Connor Limpert kick good | 40 | 43 |
| 4 | 0:04 | 11 | 40 | 3:39 | A&M | 27-yard field goal by Daniel LaCamera | 43 | 43 |
| OT | | 3 | 25 | | A&M | Christian Kirk 10-yard touchdown reception from Kellen Mond, Daniel LaCamera kick good | 50 | 43 |
| "TOP" = time of possession. For other American football terms, see Glossary of American football. | | | | | | | 50 | 43 |

| Statistics | A&M | ARK |
|---|---|---|
| First downs | 20 | 21 |
| Total yards | 501 | 457 |
| Rushes–yards | 42–285 | 45–226 |
| Passing yards | 216 | 231 |
| Passing: Comp–Att–Int | 14–27–1 | 13–27–1 |
| Time of possession | 27:43 | 32:17 |

| Team | Category | Player | Statistics |
|---|---|---|---|
| Texas A&M | Passing | Kellen Mond | 14/27, 216 yds, 2 TD, 1 INT |
| Texas A&M | Rushing | Kellen Mond | 10 car, 116 yds |
| Texas A&M | Receiving | Christian Kirk | 5 rec, 110 yds, 2 TD |
| Arkansas | Passing | Austin Allen | 12/25, 229 yds, 2 TD, 1 INT |
| Arkansas | Rushing | Chase Hayden | 13 car, 77 yds, 1 TD |
| Arkansas | Receiving | Jonathan Nance | 3 rec, 100 yds, 1 TD |

=== New Mexico State ===
New Mexico State Aggies at Arkansas Razorbacks

| Quarter | 1 | 2 | 3 | 4 | Total |
|---|---|---|---|---|---|
| Aggies | 0 | 10 | 7 | 7 | 24 |
| Razorbacks | 14 | 14 | 7 | 7 | 42 |

at Donald W. Reynolds Razorback Stadium • Fayetteville, Arkansas

- Date: September 30, 2017
- Game time: 11:00 a.m. CT
- Game weather: Scattered clouds • Temp: 70°F • Wind: E 4 mph
- Game attendance: 70,727
- Referee: David Smith
- TV announcers (SEC Network): Taylor Zarzour (play-by-play), Andre Ware (color), Olivia Harlan (sideline)
- ESPN Box Score • UofA Box Score

Scoring summary

| Quarter | Time | Drive | | | Team | Scoring information | Score | |
| Quarter | Time | Plays | Yards | TOP | Team | Scoring information | NMSU | ARK |
|---|---|---|---|---|---|---|---|---|
| 1 | 11:01 | 9 | 80 | 3:59 | ARK | Deon Stewart 38-yard touchdown reception from Austin Allen, Connor Limpert kick good | 0 | 7 |
| 1 | 0:00 | 8 | 80 | 3:34 | ARK | Devwah Whaley 3-yard touchdown run, Connor Limpert kick good | 0 | 14 |
| 2 | 8:38 | 8 | 61 | 4:59 | ARK | Jonathan Nance 31-yard touchdown reception from Austin Allen, Connor Limpert kick good | 0 | 21 |
| 2 | 5:51 | 7 | 65 | 2:47 | NMSU | Tyler Rogers 1-yard touchdown run, Dylan Brown kick good | 7 | 21 |
| 2 | 1:34 | 8 | 68 | 4:17 | ARK | Chase Hayden 2-yard touchdown run, Connor Limpert kick good | 7 | 28 |
| 2 | 0:00 | 7 | 68 | 1:34 | NMSU | 27-yard field goal by Dylan Brown | 10 | 28 |
| 3 | 11:21 | 11 | 80 | 3:39 | NMSU | O.J. Clark 9-yard touchdown reception from Tyler Clark, Dylan Brown kick good | 17 | 28 |
| 3 | 2:30 | 16 | 63 | 9:01 | ARK | Jonathan Nance -yard touchdown reception from Austin Allen, Connor Limpert kick good | 17 | 35 |
| 4 | 14:54 | 6 | 22 | 2:26 | ARK | Chase Hayden 1-yard touchdown run, Connor Limpert kick good | 17 | 42 |
| 4 | 12:47 | 6 | 81 | 2:07 | NMSU | Jaleel Scott 36-yard touchdown reception from Tyler Rogers, Dylan Brown kick good | 24 | 42 |
| "TOP" = time of possession. For other American football terms, see Glossary of American football. | | | | | | | 24 | 42 |

| Statistics | NMSU | ARK |
|---|---|---|
| First downs | 18 | 29 |
| Total yards | 355 | 494 |
| Rushes–yards | 14–11 | 51–230 |
| Passing yards | 344 | 264 |
| Passing: Comp–Att–Int | 23–38–1 | 19–26–1 |
| Time of possession | 18:25 | 41:35 |

| Team | Category | Player | Statistics |
|---|---|---|---|
| New Mexico State | Passing | Tyler Rogers | 23/38, 344 yds, 2 TD, 1 INT |
| New Mexico State | Rushing | Larry Rose III | 8 car, 25 yds |
| New Mexico State | Receiving | Jaleel Scott | 9 rec, 174 yds, 1 TD |
| Arkansas | Passing | Austin Allen | 19/26, 264 yds, 3 TD, 1 INT |
| Arkansas | Rushing | Devwah Whaley | 19 car, 119 yds, 1 TD |
| Arkansas | Receiving | Jordan Jones | 4 rec, 84 yds |

=== At South Carolina ===
Arkansas Razorbacks at South Carolina Gamecocks

| Quarter | 1 | 2 | 3 | 4 | Total |
|---|---|---|---|---|---|
| Razorbacks | 3 | 7 | 0 | 12 | 22 |
| Gamecocks | 3 | 14 | 17 | 14 | 48 |

at Williams-Brice Stadium • Columbia, South Carolina

- Date: October 7, 2017
- Game time: 3:00 p.m. CT
- Game weather: Mostly cloudy • Temp: 81°F • Wind: SW 2 mph
- Game attendance: 79,416
- Referee: Marc Curles
- TV announcers (SEC Network): Dave Neal (play-by-play), Matt Stinchcomb (color), Dawn Davenport (sideline)
- UofA Box Score

Scoring summary

| Quarter | Time | Drive | | | Team | Scoring information | Score | |
| Quarter | Time | Plays | Yards | TOP | Team | Scoring information | ARK | SC |
|---|---|---|---|---|---|---|---|---|
| 1 | 9:46 | 4 | 0 | 1:27 | SC | 33-yard field goal by Parker White | 0 | 3 |
| 1 | 6:31 | 8 | 45 | 3:15 | ARK | 48-yard field goal by Connor Limpert | 3 | 3 |
| 2 | 14:15 | 2 | 65 | 0:45 | SC | Hayden Hurst 62-yard touchdown reception from Jake Bentley, Parker White kick good | 3 | 10 |
| 2 | 8:26 | 12 | 75 | 5:49 | ARK | Jordan Jones 5-yard touchdown reception from Austin Allen, Connor Limpert kick good | 10 | 10 |
| 2 | 0:04 | 8 | 69 | 1:54 | SC | Bryan Edwards 18-yard touchdown reception from Jake Bentley, Parker White kick good | 10 | 17 |
| 3 | 9:28 | 9 | 50 | 3:49 | SC | 29-yard field goal by Parker White | 10 | 20 |
| 3 | 8:33 | | | | SC | Interception returned 34 yards for touchdown by Skai Moore, Parker White kick good | 10 | 27 |
| 3 | 4:23 | | | | SC | Fumble recovery returned 73 yards for touchdown by T.J. Brunson, Parker White kick good | 10 | 34 |
| 4 | 12:47 | 11 | 60 | 5:37 | SC | Ty'Son Williams 3-yard touchdown reception from Jake Bentley, Parker White kick good | 10 | 41 |
| 4 | 8:36 | 10 | 75 | 4:11 | ARK | David Williams 4-yard touchdown run, 2-point pass failed | 16 | 41 |
| 4 | 3:33 | | | | SC | Interception returned 45 yards for touchdown by Keisean Nixon, Alexander Woznick kick good | 16 | 48 |
| 4 | 1:40 | 5 | 58 | 1:53 | ARK | Jonathan Nance 34-yard touchdown reception from Cole Kelley, 2-point pass failed | 22 | 48 |
| "TOP" = time of possession. For other American football terms, see Glossary of American football. | | | | | | | 22 | 48 |

| Statistics | ARK | SC |
|---|---|---|
| First downs | 19 | 19 |
| Total yards | 330 | 358 |
| Rushes–yards | 32–106 | 36–159 |
| Passing yards | 224 | 199 |
| Passing: Comp–Att–Int | 20–37–2 | 16–31–0 |
| Time of possession | 30:25 | 29:35 |

| Team | Category | Player | Statistics |
|---|---|---|---|
| Arkansas | Passing | Cole Kelley | 8/13, 140 yds, 1 TD, 1 INT |
| Arkansas | Rushing | David Williams | 7 car, 32 yds, 1 TD |
| Arkansas | Receiving | Jonathan Nance | 8 rec, 116 yds, 1 TD |
| South Carolina | Passing | Jake Bentley | 16/31, 199 yds, 3 TD |
| South Carolina | Rushing | Rico Dowdle | 11 car, 61 yds |
| South Carolina | Receiving | Hayden Hurst | 2 rec, 76 yds, 1 TD |

=== At No. 1 Alabama ===
Arkansas Razorbacks at No. 1 Alabama Crimson Tide

| Quarter | 1 | 2 | 3 | 4 | Total |
|---|---|---|---|---|---|
| Razorbacks | 0 | 0 | 3 | 6 | 9 |
| No. 1 Crimson Tide | 17 | 7 | 7 | 10 | 41 |

at Bryant–Denny Stadium • Tuscaloosa, Alabama

- Date: October 14, 2017
- TV announcers (ESPN): Chris Fowler (play-by-play), Kirk Herbstreit (color), Maria Taylor (sidelines)

Scoring summary

| Quarter | Time | Drive | | | Team | Scoring information | Score | |
| Quarter | Time | Plays | Yards | TOP | Team | Scoring information | ARK | BAMA |
|---|---|---|---|---|---|---|---|---|
| 1 | 14:45 | 1 | 75 | 0:15 | BAMA | Damien Harris 75-yard touchdown run, Andy Pappanastos kick good | 0 | 7 |
| 1 | 11:36 | 4 | 4 | 1:27 | BAMA | 39-yard field goal by Andy Pappanastos | 0 | 10 |
| 1 | 7:24 | 8 | 65 | 3:03 | BAMA | Damien Harris 4-yard touchdown run, Andy Pappanastos kick good | 0 | 17 |
| 2 | 1:20 | 9 | 75 | 3:19 | BAMA | Jalen Hurts 11-yard touchdown run, Andy Pappanastos kick good | 0 | 24 |
| 3 | 4:16 | 13 | 48 | 5:18 | ARK | 30-yard field goal by Connor Limpert | 3 | 24 |
| 3 | 1:25 | 6 | 78 | 2:51 | BAMA | Henry Ruggs III 20-yard touchdown reception from Jalen Hurts, Andy Pappanastos kick good | 3 | 31 |
| 4 | 12:29 | 5 | 35 | 2:15 | BAMA | Najee Harris 4-yard touchdown run, Andy Pappanastos kick good | 3 | 38 |
| 4 | 8:55 | 5 | 37 | 2:10 | BAMA | 21-yard field goal by Andy Pappanastos | 3 | 41 |
| 4 | 3:03 | 13 | 75 | 5:52 | ARK | Jordan Jones 3-yard touchdown reception from Cole Kelley, Connor Limpert kick no good | 9 | 41 |
| "TOP" = time of possession. For other American football terms, see Glossary of American football. | | | | | | | 9 | 41 |

| Statistics | ARK | BAMA |
|---|---|---|
| First downs | 15 | 23 |
| Total yards | 227 | 496 |
| Rushes–yards | 29–27 | 43–308 |
| Passing yards | 200 | 188 |
| Passing: Comp–Att–Int | 23–43–1 | 13–21–1 |
| Time of possession | 29:33 | 30:27 |

| Team | Category | Player | Statistics |
|---|---|---|---|
| Arkansas | Passing | Cole Kelley | 23/42, 200 yds, 1 TD, 1 INT |
| Arkansas | Rushing | Devwah Whaley | 5 car, 18 yds |
| Arkansas | Receiving | Jordan Jones | 4 rec, 72 yds, 1 TD |
| Alabama | Passing | Jalen Hurts | 12/19, 155 yds, 1 TD, 1 INT |
| Alabama | Rushing | Damien Harris | 9 rec, 125 yds, 2 TD |
| Alabama | Receiving | Calvin Ridley | 4 rec, 51 yds |

=== No. 21 Auburn ===
No. 21 Auburn Tigers at Arkansas Razorbacks

| Quarter | 1 | 2 | 3 | 4 | Total |
|---|---|---|---|---|---|
| No. 21 Tigers | 10 | 7 | 28 | 7 | 52 |
| Razorbacks | 3 | 3 | 7 | 7 | 20 |

at Donald W. Reynolds Razorback Stadium • Fayetteville, Arkansas

- Date: October 21, 2017
- Game time: 6:39 p.m.
- Game weather: Temperature: 74° • Wind: SE 10 mph • Weather: Partly Cloudy
- Game attendance: 71,961
- Referee: David Smith
- TV announcers (SEC Network): Tom Hart (play-by-play), Jordan Rodgers (analyst), Cole Cubelic (sideline reporter)

Scoring summary

| Quarter | Time | Drive | | | Team | Scoring information | Score | |
| Quarter | Time | Plays | Yards | TOP | Team | Scoring information | AUB | ARK |
|---|---|---|---|---|---|---|---|---|
| 1 | 11:39 | 8 | 85 | 2:32 | AUB | Jarrett Stidham 15-yard touchdown run, Daniel Carlson kick good | 7 | 0 |
| 1 | 8:02 | 8 | 59 | 3:37 | ARK | 34-yard field goal by Connor Limpert | 7 | 3 |
| 1 | 1:07 | 14 | 67 | 6:45 | AUB | 21-yard field goal by Daniel Carlson | 10 | 3 |
| 2 | 12:10 | 10 | 75 | 2:50 | AUB | Kerryon Johnson 2-yard touchdown run, Daniel Carlson kick good | 17 | 3 |
| 2 | 0:46 | 8 | 70 | 2:21 | ARK | 38-yard field goal by Connor Limpert | 17 | 6 |
| 3 | 12:10 | 10 | 75 | 2:50 | AUB | Kamryn Pettway 2-yard touchdown run, Daniel Carlson kick good | 24 | 6 |
| 3 | 7:33 | 4 | 70 | 1:35 | AUB | Kamryn Pettway 38-yard touchdown run, Daniel Carlson kick good | 31 | 6 |
| 3 | 4:13 | 1 | 62 | 0:11 | AUB | Darius Slayton 62-yard touchdown reception from Ryan Davis, Daniel Carlson kick good | 38 | 6 |
| 3 | 3:57 | | | | ARK | Kickoff returned 100 yards for touchdown by DeVion Warren, Connor Limpert kick good | 38 | 13 |
| 3 | 0:28 | 3 | 23 | 1:02 | AUB | Kamryn Pettway 11-yard touchdown run, Daniel Carlson kick good | 45 | 13 |
| 4 | 9:44 | 6 | 80 | 2:54 | AUB | Devan Barrett 4-yard touchdown reception from Malik Willis, Daniel Carlson kick good | 52 | 13 |
| 4 | 3:07 | 13 | 75 | 6:37 | ARK | Devwah Whaley 2-yard touchdown run, Conner Limpert kick good | 52 | 20 |
| "TOP" = time of possession. For other American football terms, see Glossary of American football. | | | | | | | 52 | 20 |

| Statistics | AUB | ARK |
|---|---|---|
| First downs | 26 | 19 |
| Total yards | 629 | 334 |
| Rushes–yards | 47–345 | 42–171 |
| Passing yards | 284 | 163 |
| Passing: Comp–Att–Int | 21–30–1 | 15–26–0 |
| Time of possession | 31:10 | 28:50 |

| Team | Category | Player | Statistics |
|---|---|---|---|
| Auburn | Passing | Jarrett Stidham | 19/28, 218 yds, 1 INT |
| Auburn | Rushing | Kamryn Pettway | 11 car, 90 yds, 3 TD |
| Auburn | Receiving | Darius Slayton | 4 rec, 146 yds, 1 TD |
| Arkansas | Passing | Cole Kelley | 15/26, 163 yds |
| Arkansas | Rushing | David Williams | 14 car, 86 yds |
| Arkansas | Receiving | Jordan Jones | 2 rec, 33 yds |

=== At Ole Miss ===
Arkansas Razorbacks at Ole Miss Rebels

| Quarter | 1 | 2 | 3 | 4 | Total |
|---|---|---|---|---|---|
| Razorbacks | 7 | 14 | 7 | 10 | 38 |
| Rebels | 21 | 10 | 0 | 6 | 37 |

at Vaught–Hemingway Stadium • Oxford, Mississippi

- Date: October 28, 2017

Scoring summary

| Quarter | Time | Drive | | | Team | Scoring information | Score | |
| Quarter | Time | Plays | Yards | TOP | Team | Scoring information | ARK | MISS |
|---|---|---|---|---|---|---|---|---|
| 1 | 14:29 | 2 | 74 | 0:31 | MISS | Jordan Wilkins 64-yard touchdown run, Gary Wunderlich kick good | 0 | 7 |
| 1 | 7:55 | 13 | 70 | 6:29 | ARK | Devwah Whaley 12-yard touchdown reception from Cole Kelley, Connor Limpert kick good | 7 | 7 |
| 1 | 6:44 | 4 | 72 | 1:05 | MISS | Eric Swinney 2-yard touchdown run, Gary Wunderlich kick good | 7 | 14 |
| 1 | 4:23 | 5 | 67 | 1:11 | MISS | Jordan Ta'amu 49-yard touchdown run, Gary Wunderlich kick good | 7 | 21 |
| 2 | 13:03 | 10 | 53 | 3:14 | MISS | 37-yard field goal by Gary Wunderlich | 7 | 24 |
| 2 | 10:51 | 4 | 66 | 1:10 | MISS | Jordan Ta'amu 8-yard touchdown run, Gary Wunderlich kick good | 7 | 31 |
| 2 | 2:44 | 10 | 70 | 5:44 | ARK | Cole Kelley 15-yard touchdown run, Connor Limpert kick good | 14 | 31 |
| 2 | 0:13 | 3 | 21 | 0:55 | ARK | Deon Stewart 23-yard touchdown reception from Cole Kelley, Connor Limpert kick good | 21 | 31 |
| 3 | 10:41 | 8 | 73 | 4:13 | ARK | Cheyenne O'Grady 9-yard touchdown reception from Cole Kelley, Connor Limpert kick good | 28 | 31 |
| 4 | 14:24 | 10 | 51 | 2:36 | MISS | 36-yard field goal by Gary Wunderlich | 28 | 34 |
| 4 | 9:52 | 5 | 39 | 1:59 | MISS | 20-yard field goal by Gary Wunderlich | 28 | 37 |
| 4 | 6:01 | | | | ARK | Fumble recovery returned 22 yards for touchdown by Kevin Richardson II, Connor Limpert kick good | 35 | 37 |
| 4 | 0:04 | 12 | 62 | 4:00 | ARK | 34-yard field goal by Connor Limpert | 38 | 37 |
| "TOP" = time of possession. For other American football terms, see Glossary of American football. | | | | | | | 38 | 37 |

| Statistics | ARK | MISS |
|---|---|---|
| First downs | 27 | 22 |
| Total yards | 449 | 566 |
| Rushes–yards | 53–260 | 29–198 |
| Passing yards | 189 | 368 |
| Passing: Comp–Att–Int | 19–30–1 | 20–30–1 |
| Time of possession | 40:27 | 19:33 |

| Team | Category | Player | Statistics |
|---|---|---|---|
| Arkansas | Passing | Cole Kelley | 19/30, 189 yds, 3 TD, 1 INT |
| Arkansas | Rushing | T.J. Hammonds | 11 car, 84 yds |
| Arkansas | Receiving | Deon Stewart | 4 rec, 49 yds, 1 TD |
| Ole Miss | Passing | Jordan Ta'amu | 20/30, 368 yds, 1 INT |
| Ole Miss | Rushing | Jordan Wilkins | 16 car, 118 yds, 1 TD |
| Ole Miss | Receiving | D.K. Metcalf | 4 rec, 107 yds |

=== Coastal Carolina ===
Coastal Carolina Chanticleers at Arkansas Razorbacks (Homecoming 2017)

| Quarter | 1 | 2 | 3 | 4 | Total |
|---|---|---|---|---|---|
| Chanticleers | 7 | 7 | 17 | 7 | 38 |
| Razorbacks | 7 | 10 | 8 | 14 | 39 |

at Donald W. Reynolds Razorback Stadium • Fayetteville, Arkansas

- Date: November 4, 2017
- Game time: 3:00 p.m.
- Game attendance: 61,476
- TV: SECN

Scoring summary

| Quarter | Time | Drive | | | Team | Scoring information | Score | |
| Quarter | Time | Plays | Yards | TOP | Team | Scoring information | CCAR | ARK |
|---|---|---|---|---|---|---|---|---|
| 1 | 11:52 | 7 | 68 | 3:08 | ARK | Devwah Whaley 5-yard touchdown run, Connor Limpert kick good | 0 | 7 |
| 1 | 4:39 | 14 | 75 | 7:13 | CCAR | Omar Black 9-yard touchdown reception from Tyler Keane, Evan Rabon kick good | 7 | 7 |
| 2 | 12:20 | 7 | 88 | 3:40 | CCAR | Alex James 6-yard touchdown run, Evan Rabon kick good | 14 | 7 |
| 2 | 11:10 | 2 | 74 | 1:10 | ARK | T.J. Hammonds 60-yard touchdown reception from Cole Kelley, Connor Limpert kick good | 14 | 14 |
| 2 | 1:07 | 11 | 52 | 5:38 | ARK | 46-yard field goal by Connor Limpert | 14 | 17 |
| 3 | 12:32 | 6 | 75 | 2:28 | CCAR | Malcolm Williams 16-yard touchdown reception from Kilton Anderson, Evan Rabon kick good | 21 | 17 |
| 3 | 10:31 | | | | CCAR | Fumble recovery returned 31 yards for touchdown by Nicholas Clark, Evan Rabon kick good | 28 | 17 |
| 3 | 8:04 | 6 | 71 | 2:27 | ARK | Austin Cantrell 5-yard touchdown run, 2-point pass good | 28 | 25 |
| 3 | 3:48 | 10 | 60 | 4:16 | CCAR | 32-yard field goal by Evan Rabon | 31 | 25 |
| 4 | 12:57 | 8 | 35 | 3:52 | CCAR | Chris Jones 10-yard touchdown reception from Kilton Anderson, Evan Rabon kick good | 38 | 25 |
| 4 | 10:09 | 1 | 88 | 0:14 | ARK | T.J. Hammonds 88-yard touchdown run, Connor Limpert kick good | 38 | 32 |
| 4 | 1:55 | 11 | 76 | 5:54 | ARK | Cole Kelley 1-yard touchdown run, Connor Limpert kick good | 38 | 39 |
| "TOP" = time of possession. For other American football terms, see Glossary of American football. | | | | | | | 38 | 39 |

| Statistics | CCAR | ARK |
|---|---|---|
| First downs | 21 | 21 |
| Total yards | 359 | 523 |
| Rushes–yards | 38–131 | 35–259 |
| Passing yards | 228 | 264 |
| Passing: Comp–Att–Int | 15–28–0 | 16–25–0 |
| Time of possession | 31:02 | 28:58 |

| Team | Category | Player | Statistics |
|---|---|---|---|
| Coastal Carolina | Passing | Kilton Anderson | 6/17, 115 yds, 2 TD |
| Coastal Carolina | Rushing | Jacqez Hairston | 9 car, 45 yds |
| Coastal Carolina | Receiving | Chris Jones | 4 rec, 106 yds, 1 TD |
| Arkansas | Passing | Cole Kelley | 16/25, 264 yds, 1 TD |
| Arkansas | Rushing | T.J. Hammonds | 7 car, 119 yds, 1 TD |
| Arkansas | Receiving | Jonathan Nance | 2 rec, 61 yds |

=== At LSU ===
Arkansas Razorbacks at LSU Tigers (63rd Battle for the Golden Boot)

| Quarter | 1 | 2 | 3 | 4 | Total |
|---|---|---|---|---|---|
| Razorbacks | 0 | 7 | 3 | 0 | 10 |
| Tigers | 7 | 0 | 12 | 14 | 33 |

at Tiger Stadium • Baton Rouge, Louisiana

- Date: November 11, 2017

Scoring summary

| Quarter | Time | Drive | | | Team | Scoring information | Score | |
| Quarter | Time | Plays | Yards | TOP | Team | Scoring information | ARK | LSU |
|---|---|---|---|---|---|---|---|---|
| 1 | 1:39 | 3 | 62 | 1:24 | LSU | D. J. Chark 45-yard touchdown reception from Danny Etling, Connor Culp kick good | 0 | 7 |
| 2 | 0:16 | 10 | 86 | 5:09 | ARK | Devwah Whaley 1-yard touchdown run, Connor Limpert kick good | 7 | 7 |
| 3 | 11:13 | 8 | 75 | 3:47 | LSU | Derrius Guice 6-yard touchdown run, Connor Culp kick no good | 7 | 13 |
| 3 | 6:22 | 9 | 53 | 4:51 | ARK | 38-yard field goal by Connor Limpert | 10 | 13 |
| 3 | 4:29 | 5 | 65 | 1:53 | LSU | Derrius Guice 33-yard touchdown run, Connor Culp kick no good | 10 | 19 |
| 4 | 14:52 | 4 | 69 | 1:43 | LSU | D.J. Chark 68-yard touchdown reception from Danny Etling, Jack Gonsoulin kick good | 10 | 26 |
| 4 | 3:46 | 5 | 22 | 2:36 | LSU | Derrius Guice 1-yard touchdown run, Jack Gonsoulin kick good | 10 | 33 |
| "TOP" = time of possession. For other American football terms, see Glossary of American football. | | | | | | | 10 | 33 |

| Statistics | ARK | LSU |
|---|---|---|
| First downs | 17 | 21 |
| Total yards | 318 | 415 |
| Rushes–yards | 34–142 | 39–198 |
| Passing yards | 176 | 217 |
| Passing: Comp–Att–Int | 16–33–1 | 11–16–0 |
| Time of possession | 31:06 | 28:54 |

| Team | Category | Player | Statistics |
|---|---|---|---|
| Arkansas | Passing | Austin Allen | 13/23, 140 yds |
| Arkansas | Rushing | David Williams | 13 car, 81 yds |
| Arkansas | Receiving | Will Gragg | 3 rec, 47 yds |
| LSU | Passing | Danny Etling | 11/16, 217 yds, 2 TD |
| LSU | Rushing | Derrius Guice | 21 car, 147 yds, 3 TD |
| LSU | Receiving | D.J. Chark | 4 rec, 130 yds, 2 TD |

=== No. 17 Mississippi State ===
No. 17 Mississippi State Bulldogs at Arkansas Razorbacks

| Quarter | 1 | 2 | 3 | 4 | Total |
|---|---|---|---|---|---|
| No. 17 Bulldogs | 0 | 14 | 0 | 14 | 28 |
| Razorbacks | 14 | 0 | 7 | 0 | 21 |

at Donald W. Reynolds Razorback Stadium • Fayetteville, Arkansas

- Date: November 18, 2017

Scoring summary

| Quarter | Time | Drive | | | Team | Scoring information | Score | |
| Quarter | Time | Plays | Yards | TOP | Team | Scoring information | MSST | ARK |
|---|---|---|---|---|---|---|---|---|
| 1 | 12:46 | 3 | 36 | 0:54 | ARK | David Williams 3-yard touchdown run, Conner Limpert kick good | 0 | 7 |
| 1 | 7:26 | | | | ARK | Fumble recovered in end zone for touchdown by Briston Guidry, Connor Limpert kick good | 0 | 14 |
| 2 | 5:17 | 8 | 50 | 2:45 | MSST | Nick Fitzgerald 18-yard touchdown run, Jace Christmann kick good | 7 | 14 |
| 2 | 2:18 | 3 | 17 | 1:26 | MSST | Aeris Williams 8-yard touchdown run, Jace Christmann kick good | 14 | 14 |
| 3 | 4:35 | 10 | 75 | 4:53 | ARK | Devwah Whaley 1-yard touchdown run, Connor Limpert kick good | 14 | 21 |
| 4 | 3:57 | 6 | 55 | 3:06 | MSST | Reginald Todd 37-yard touchdown reception from Nick Fitzgerald, Jace Christmann kick good | 21 | 21 |
| 4 | 0:17 | 9 | 44 | 2:44 | MSST | Deddrick Thomas 6-yard touchdown reception from Nick Fitzgerald, Jace Christmann kick good | 28 | 21 |
| "TOP" = time of possession. For other American football terms, see Glossary of American football. | | | | | | | 28 | 21 |

| Statistics | MSST | ARK |
|---|---|---|
| First downs | 19 | 12 |
| Total yards | 348 | 221 |
| Rushes–yards | 48–195 | 34–97 |
| Passing yards | 153 | 124 |
| Passing: Comp–Att–Int | 12–23–0 | 12–18–0 |
| Time of possession | 33:31 | 26:29 |

| Team | Category | Player | Statistics |
|---|---|---|---|
| Mississippi State | Passing | Nick Fitzgerald | 12/23, 153 yds, 2 TD |
| Mississippi State | Rushing | Nick Fitzgerald | 22 car, 101 yds, 1 TD |
| Mississippi State | Receiving | Reginald Todd | 3 rec, 50 yds, 1 TD |
| Arkansas | Passing | Austin Allen | 12/18, 124 yds |
| Arkansas | Rushing | David Williams | 8 car, 75 yds, 1 TD |
| Arkansas | Receiving | Deon Stewart | 2 rec, 39 yds |

=== Missouri ===
Missouri Tigers at Arkansas Razorbacks (9th Battle Line Rivalry)

| Quarter | 1 | 2 | 3 | 4 | Total |
|---|---|---|---|---|---|
| Tigers | 7 | 24 | 7 | 10 | 48 |
| Razorbacks | 21 | 7 | 7 | 10 | 45 |

at Donald W. Reynolds Razorback Stadium • Fayetteville, Arkansas

- Date: November 24, 2017
- Game time: 1:30 p.m. CT
- TV announcers (CBS): Brad Nessler (play-by-play), Gary Danielson (color), Allie LaForce (sideline)

Scoring summary

| Quarter | Time | Drive | | | Team | Scoring information | Score | |
| Quarter | Time | Plays | Yards | TOP | Team | Scoring information | MO | ARK |
|---|---|---|---|---|---|---|---|---|
| 1 | 12:19 | 5 | 70 | 1:25 | ARK | Austin Allen 1-yard touchdown run, Connor Limpert kick good | 0 | 7 |
| 1 | 4:37 | 11 | 92 | 3:26 | MO | Ish Witter 1-yard touchdown run, Tucker McCann kick good | 7 | 7 |
| 1 | 2:44 | 4 | 75 | 1:53 | ARK | Jordan Jones 57-yard touchdown reception from Austin Allen, Connor Limpert kick good | 7 | 14 |
| 1 | 1:07 | 2 | 29 | 0:43 | ARK | David Williams 16-yard touchdown run, Connor Limpert kick good | 7 | 21 |
| 2 | 13:21 | 6 | 92 | 2:46 | MO | Emanuel Hall 55-yard touchdown reception from Drew Lock, Tucker McCann kick good | 14 | 21 |
| 2 | 7:47 | 5 | 86 | 2:33 | ARK | David Williams 22-yard touchdown run, Connor Limpert kick good | 14 | 28 |
| 2 | 6:27 | 5 | 79 | 1:20 | MO | Emanuel Hall 56-yard touchdown reception from Drew Lock, Tucker McCann kick good | 21 | 28 |
| 2 | 4:09 | 5 | 55 | 1:20 | MO | Albert Okwuegbunam 10-yard touchdown reception from Drew Lock, Tucker McCann kick good | 28 | 28 |
| 2 | 0:07 | 11 | 60 | 3:04 | MO | 37-yard field goal by Tucker McCann | 31 | 28 |
| 3 | 2:02 | 9 | 77 | 5:04 | ARK | Devwah Whaley 28-yard touchdown run, Connor Limpert kick good | 31 | 35 |
| 4 | 12:59 | 15 | 75 | 4:03 | MO | Albert Okwuegbunam 8-yard touchdown reception from Drew Lock, Tucker McCann kick good | 38 | 35 |
| 4 | 10:42 | 6 | 49 | 2:17 | ARK | David Williams 24-yard touchdown reception from Austin Allen, Connor Limpert kick good | 38 | 42 |
| 4 | 8:14 | 8 | 89 | 2:28 | MO | J'Mon Moore 24-yard touchdown reception from Drew Lock, Tucker McCann kick good | 45 | 42 |
| 4 | 5:00 | 7 | 47 | 3:14 | ARK | 42-yard field goal by Connor Limpert | 45 | 45 |
| 4 | 0:05 | 14 | 75 | 4:55 | MO | 19-yard field goal by Tucker McCann | 48 | 45 |
| "TOP" = time of possession. For other American football terms, see Glossary of American football. | | | | | | | 48 | 45 |

| Statistics | MO | ARK |
|---|---|---|
| First downs | 35 | 19 |
| Total yards | 696 | 446 |
| Rushes–yards | 60–248 | 31–133 |
| Passing yards | 448 | 313 |
| Passing: Comp–Att–Int | 25–42–2 | 14–30–1 |
| Time of possession | 33:21 | 26:39 |

| Team | Category | Player | Statistics |
|---|---|---|---|
| Missouri | Passing | Drew Lock | 25/42, 448 yds, 5 TD, 2 INT |
| Missouri | Rushing | Ish Witter | 39 car, 170 yds, 1 TD |
| Missouri | Receiving | J'Mon Moore | 10 rec, 160 yds, 1 TD |
| Arkansas | Passing | Austin Allen | 14/29, 313 yds, 2 TD, 1 INT |
| Arkansas | Rushing | David Williams | 11 car, 75 yds, 2 TD |
| Arkansas | Receiving | Jordan Jones | 2 rec, 122 yds, 1 TD |

== Roster ==
2017 Arkansas Razorbacks football team roster
Players
Coaches
Offense

| Pos. | # | Name | Class |
|---|---|---|---|
| WR | 1 | Jared Cornelius (injured) | Sr |
| RB | 2 | Chase Hayden | Fr |
| WR | 3 | Koilan Jackson | Fr |
| QB | 4 | Ty Storey | So |
| WR | 5 | Brandon Martin | So |
| RB | 6 | T.J. Hammonds | So |
| WR | 7 | Jonathan Nance | Jr |
| QB | 8 | Austin Allen (C) | Sr |
| WR | 9 | De'Vion Warren | Fr |
| WR | 10 | Jordan Jones | Fr |
| QB | 11 | Daulton Hyatt | Fr |
| WR | 13 | Deon Stewart | So |
| WR | 14 | Maleek Barkley | Fr |
| QB | 14 | Carson Proctor | Fr |
| QB | 15 | Cole Kelley | Fr |
| WR | 16 | La'Michael Pettway | So |
| WR | 17 | Kofi Boateng | Fr |
| QB | 18 | Jack Lindsey | Fr |
| TE | 18 | Jeremy Patton | Jr |
| WR | 19 | River Warnock (injured) | Jr |
| RB | 21 | Devwah Whaley | So |
| RB | 23 | Maleek Williams | Fr |
| RB | 26 | Justice Hobbs | Fr |
| RB | 31 | Connor McPherson | Sr |
| FB | 32 | Hayden Johnson | So |
| RB | 33 | David Williams | Sr |
| FB | 34 | Kendrick Jackson | Jr |
| TE | 38 | Blake Kern | Fr |
| TE | 44 | Austin Cantrell | So |
| OL | 50 | Jake Raulerson | Sr |
| OL | 51 | Hjalte Froholdt | Jr |
| OL | 55 | Jake Heinrich | Fr |
| OL | 57 | Shane Clenin | Fr |
| OL | 60 | Brian Wallace | Jr |
| OL | 61 | Cooper Sone | So |
| OL | 62 | Johnny Gibson Jr. | Jr |
| OL | 64 | Audry Horn | Fr |
| OL | 66 | Ty Clary | Fr |
| OL | 67 | Tyler Hall | Fr |
| OL | 68 | Kirby Adcock | Fr |
| OL | 69 | Dylan Hays | Fr |
| OL | 71 | Jackson Hannah | Jr |
| OL | 72 | Frank Ragnow (C) | Sr |
| OL | 73 | Deion Malone | Jr |
| OL | 74 | Colton Jackson | So |
| OL | 75 | Zach Rogers | Jr |
| OL | 76 | Paul Ramirez | Sr |
| OL | 78 | Dalton Wagner (injured) | Fr |
| OL | 79 | Jalen Merrick | So |
| TE | 80 | Will Gragg | So |
| WR | 81 | Jarrod Barnes | Fr |
| WR | 82 | Gary Cross | Jr |
| WR | 83 | De'Shawn Gulledge | Fr |
| WR | 84 | Tyson Morris | Fr |
| TE | 85 | Cheyenne O'Grady | So |
| WR | 86 | Tobias Enlow | Fr |
| TE | 87 | Jack Kraus | Jr |
| TE | 89 | Grayson Gunter | So |

Defense

| Pos. | # | Name | Class |
|---|---|---|---|
| DB | 1 | Chevin Calloway | Fr |
| DB | 2 | Kamren Curl | Fr |
| DL | 3 | McTelvin Agim | So |
| LB | 4 | Alexy Jean-Baptiste | Fr |
| DB | 5 | Henre' Toliver | Sr |
| LB | 6 | Gabe Richardson | So |
| DL | 7 | Briston Guidry | Fr |
| LB | 8 | De'Jon Harris | So |
| DB | 9 | Santos Ramirez (C) | Jr |
| LB | 10 | Randy Ramsey | Jr |
| DB | 11 | Ryan Pulley | Jr |
| DB | 13 | Nate Dalton | So |
| DB | 14 | Britto Tutt | So |
| DB | 15 | Korey Hernandez | Fr |
| LB | 19 | Giovanni LaFrance | Fr |
| DB | 20 | De'Andre Coley | Sr |
| DB | 21 | Montaric Brown | Fr |
| DB | 22 | Deon Edwards | Fr |
| LB | 23 | Dre Greenlaw | Jr |
| DB | 24 | Jarques McClellion | Fr |
| DB | 25 | Micahh Smith | Fr |
| DB | 26 | Ryder Lucas | Jr |
| LB | 27 | Hayden Henry | Fr |
| DB | 28 | Josh Liddell | Sr |
| LB | 29 | Derrick Munson | Fr |
| DB | 30 | Kevin Richardson II (C) | Sr |
| LB | 31 | Grant Morgan | Fr |
| DB | 32 | Jordon Curtis | Fr |
| LB | 33 | Dee Walker | Fr |
| LB | 34 | Tyler Phillips | So |
| LB | 35 | Dwayne Eugene Jr. | Sr |
| DB | 38 | Reid Miller | Jr |
| DB | 39 | Byron Keaton | So |
| LB | 39 | Tyler Pennington | Fr |
| LB | 40 | Kyrei Fisher | Fr |
| DL | 41 | Austin Capps | So |
| DL | 42 | Jonathan Marshall | Fr |
| LB | 44 | Josh Paul | Fr |
| LB | 45 | Josh Harris (injured) | Jr |
| LB | 46 | Damani Carter | So |
| DL | 52 | T.J. Smith | So |
| LB | 53 | Ben Brasuell | Fr |
| LB | 54 | Terrell Collins | So |
| DL | 71 | David Porter | Fr |
| DL | 78 | Bijhon Jackson | Sr |
| LB | 86 | Jamario Bell | So |
| DL | 90 | Armon Watts | Jr |
| DL | 91 | Michael Taylor II | Jr |
| DL | 95 | Jake Hall | Jr |
| LB | 96 | Karl Roesler | Sr |
| DL | 97 | Brandon DePrato | Fr |
| DL | 99 | Elias Hale | Fr |

Special teams

| Pos. | # | Name | Class |
|---|---|---|---|
| K | 9 | Cole Hedlund | Jr |
| P | 18 | Blake Johnson | So |
| K | 42 | Connor Limpert | So |
| LS | 43 | George Madden | So |
| LS | 48 | Jordan Silver | Fr |
| LS | 49 | Robert Decker | Sr |
| P | 92 | Blake Mazza | Fr |

Head coach

- Bret Bielema
  Iowa '92; 5th season

Coordinators/assistant coaches

- Dan Enos (Offensive Coordinator)
  Michigan State '91; 3rd season
- Paul Rhoads (Defensive Coordinator)
  Missouri Western '88; 1st season (2nd overall)
- Kurt Anderson (Offensive Line)
  Michigan '01; 2nd season
- Vernon Hargreaves (Linebackers)
  Connecticut '86; 3rd season
- Barry Lunney Jr. (Tight Ends)
  Arkansas '96; 5th season
- Reggie Mitchell (Running Backs)
  Central Michigan '84; 2nd season
- John Scott Jr. (Defensive Line)
  Western Carolina '00; 1st season
- Michael Scott (Wide Receivers)
  Kansas State '95; 5th season
- Chad Walker (Outside Linebackers)
  LSU '00; 1st season

Legend

- (C) Team captain
- (S) Suspended
- (I) Ineligible
- Injured
- Redshirt

Roster
Last update: August 12, 2017

== Players drafted into the NFL ==
| Round | Pick | Player | Position | NFL club |
|---|---|---|---|---|
| 1 | 20 | Frank Ragnow | Center | Detroit Lions |
| 7 | 226 | David Williams | Running back | Denver Broncos |
