= Austin Allen (quarterback) =

American football player (born 1994)

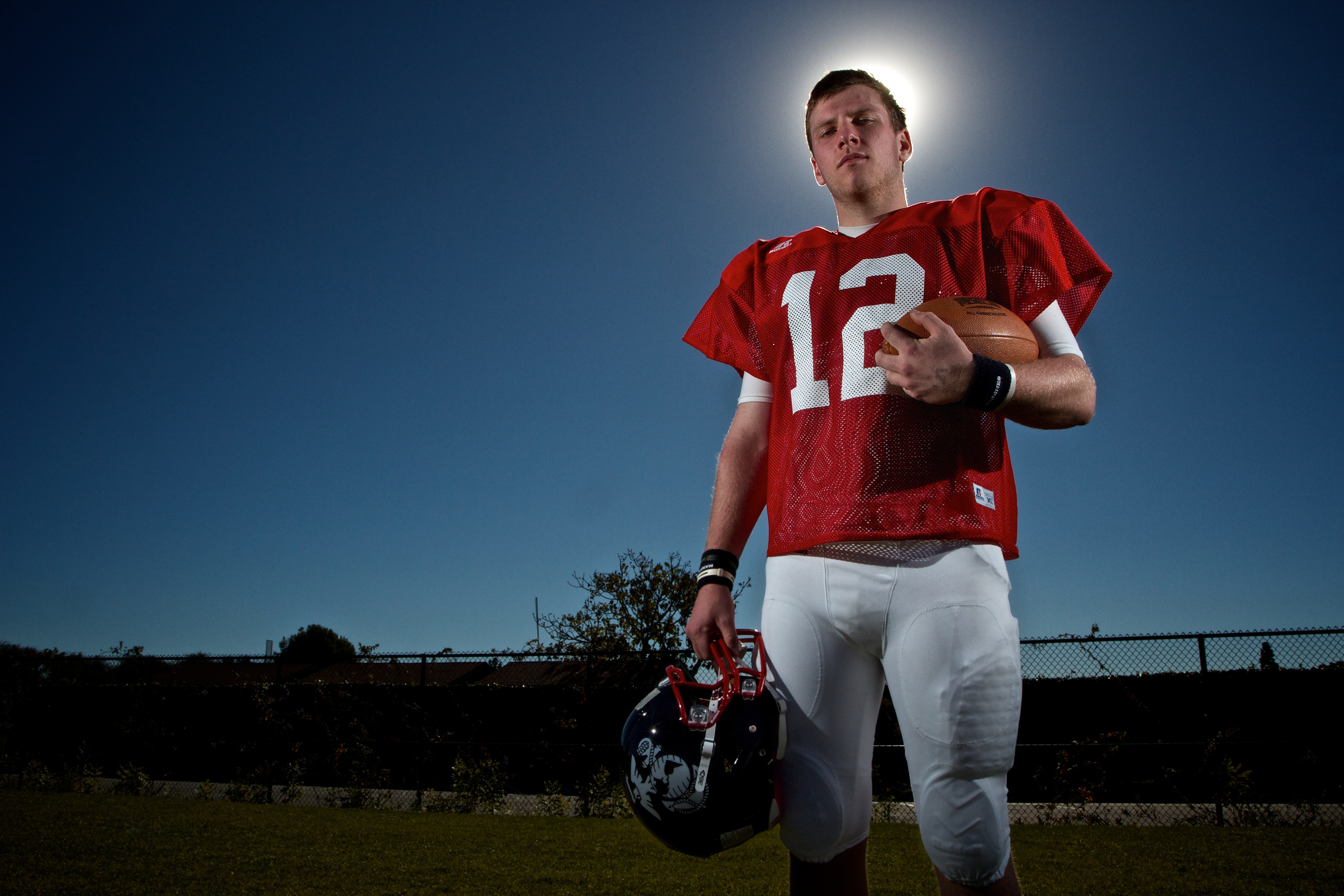
- Allen from Fayetteville High School

No. 8
- Position: Quarterback

Personal information
- Born: August 21, 1994 (age 32); Fayetteville, Arkansas, U.S.
- Listed height: 6 ft 0 in (1.83 m)
- Listed weight: 210 lb (95 kg)

Career information
- High school: Fayetteville
- College: Arkansas (2013–2017)
- NFL draft: 2018: undrafted

Career history
- Tampa Bay Buccaneers (2018)*; Memphis Express (2019)*; Salt Lake Stallions (2019)
- * Offseason or practice squad member only

Austin Allen (born August 21, 1994) is an American former football quarterback. He played college football for the Arkansas Razorbacks and was their starting quarterback from 2016 to 2017. He was signed by the Tampa Bay Buccaneers as an undrafted free agent in 2018.

== Early life ==
Allen attended Fayetteville High School in Fayetteville, Arkansas. He had 3,593 passing yards and 29 touchdowns as a senior and 4,150 yards and 46 touchdowns as a junior. He committed to play college football at the University of Arkansas, the same school his brother, Brandon, was attending.

== College career ==
After redshirting his first year at Arkansas in 2013, Allen appeared in fives games in 2014 as a backup to his brother, Brandon. He completed eight of 16 passes for 153 yards with a rushing touchdown. He spent 2015 again as the backup to Brandon, appearing in three games and completing one of three passes with the one completion going for a touchdown. With his brother graduating, Allen took over as Arkansas' starting quarterback in 2016. Allen finished his first starting year with the Razorbacks with a 7–5 record under Coach Bret Bielema. The Razorbacks went to the 2016 Belk Bowl on December 9, 2016, against Virginia Tech. Virginia Tech won the game by a score of 35–24.

== Professional career ==
Pre-draft measurables
Height	Weight	Arm length	Hand span	Wingspan	40-yard dash	10-yard split	20-yard split	20-yard shuttle	Three-cone drill	Vertical jump	Broad jump
6 ft 0 3/8 in (1.84 m)	210 lb (95 kg)	30 5/8 in (0.78 m)	9 in (0.23 m)	6 ft 1 in (1.85 m)	4.81 s	1.62 s	2.80 s	4.48 s	7.18 s	29.5 in (0.75 m)	9 ft 4 in (2.84 m)
All values from NFL Combine

Allen signed with the Tampa Bay Buccaneers as an undrafted free agent on April 30, 2018. He was waived by the Buccaneers on September 1.

In 2018, Allen signed with the Memphis Express of the Alliance of American Football for the 2019 season. On November 27, he was selected by the Salt Lake Stallions in the third round during the inaugural AAF “Protect or Pick” Quarterback Draft. The league ceased operations in April 2019.
