= Jeff Holland =

American football player (born 1997)

Profile
- Position: Linebacker

Personal information
- Born: September 27, 1997 (age 29); Jacksonville, Florida, U.S.
- Listed height: 6 ft 2 in (1.88 m)
- Listed weight: 249 lb (113 kg)

Career information
- High school: Trinity Christian Academy (Jacksonville, Florida)
- College: Auburn
- NFL draft: 2018: undrafted

Career history
- Denver Broncos (2018); Arizona Cardinals (2019)*; Buffalo Bills (2019)*; Los Angeles Chargers (2019)*; Los Angeles Rams (2019–2020)*; Atlanta Falcons (2021)*
- * Offseason or practice squad member only

Awards and highlights
- Second-team All-American (2017)

Career NFL statistics
- Total tackles: 6
- Stats at Pro Football Reference

Jeffrey Holland (born September 27, 1997) is an American former professional football player who was a linebacker in the National Football League (NFL). He played college football for the Auburn Tigers. He was signed by the Denver Broncos as an undrafted free agent in 2018.

== Early life ==
Holland attended Trinity Christian Academy in Jacksonville, Florida. He committed to Auburn University to play college football.

== College career ==
Holland played at Auburn University from 2015 to 2017. As a junior in 2017, he was named an All-American by Sports Illustrated after recording 45 tackles and 10 sacks. After the season, he decided to forgo his senior year and enter the 2018 NFL draft.

== Professional career ==
Pre-draft measurables
Height	Weight	Arm length	Hand span	Wingspan	40-yard dash	10-yard split	20-yard split	20-yard shuttle	Three-cone drill	Vertical jump	Broad jump
6 ft 1 3/8 in (1.86 m)	249 lb (113 kg)	33 1/2 in (0.85 m)	10 1/2 in (0.27 m)	6 ft 8 in (2.03 m)	4.78 s	1.73 s	2.75 s	4.72 s	7.25 s	31.5 in (0.80 m)	9 ft 10 in (3.00 m)
All values from NFL Combine/Pro Day

=== Denver Broncos ===
Holland signed with the Denver Broncos as an undrafted free agent on May 1, 2018. He was waived on September 1, 2018, and was re-signed to the practice squad. He was promoted to the active roster on November 29, 2018.

On August 11, 2019, Holland was waived by the Broncos.

=== Arizona Cardinals ===
On August 12, 2019, Holland was claimed off waivers by the Arizona Cardinals. He was waived on August 25, 2019.

=== Buffalo Bills ===
On August 26, 2019, Holland was claimed off waivers by the Buffalo Bills. He was waived on August 31, 2019.

=== Los Angeles Chargers ===
On October 1, 2019, Holland was signed to the Los Angeles Chargers practice squad. He was released on December 3, 2019.

=== Los Angeles Rams ===
On December 11, 2019, Holland was signed to the Los Angeles Rams practice squad. He signed a reserve/future contract with the Rams on December 31, 2019. He was waived on April 27, 2020.

Holland had a tryout with the Las Vegas Raiders on August 23, 2020.

=== Atlanta Falcons ===
On June 10, 2021, Holland signed with the Atlanta Falcons. He was waived on June 17.
