= Marquis Haynes =

American football player (born 1993)

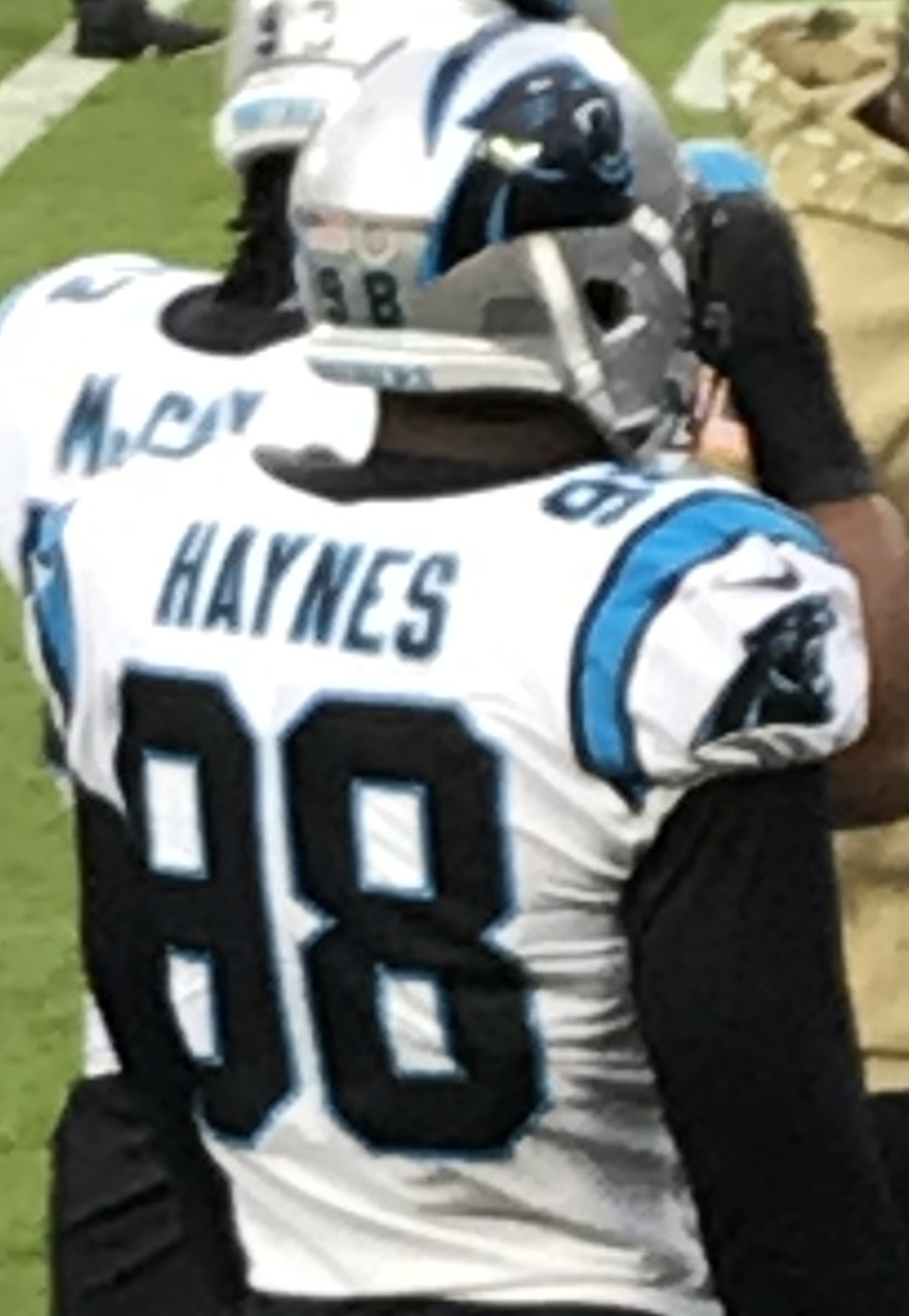
- Haynes with the Carolina Panthers in 2019

No. 98
- Position: Linebacker

Personal information
- Born: December 16, 1993 (age 32); Jacksonville, Florida, U.S.
- Listed height: 6 ft 2 in (1.88 m)
- Listed weight: 235 lb (107 kg)

Career information
- High school: University Christian School (Jacksonville)
- College: Ole Miss (2014–2017)
- NFL draft: 2018: 4th round, 136th overall pick

Career history
- Carolina Panthers (2018–2023); Arizona Cardinals (2024)*; Carolina Panthers (2024)
- * Offseason or practice squad member only

Awards and highlights
- 2× Second-team All-SEC (2015, 2017)

Career NFL statistics
- Total tackles: 104
- Sacks: 14
- Forced fumbles: 1
- Fumble recoveries: 4
- Pass deflections: 6
- Defensive touchdowns: 1
- Stats at Pro Football Reference

Marquis Jacori Haynes Sr. (born December 16, 1993) is an American former professional football player who was a linebacker in the National Football League (NFL). He played college football for the Ole Miss Rebels.

== Early life ==
Haynes attended University Christian School in Jacksonville, Florida and spent a year at Fork Union Military Academy. He committed to play college football at the University of Louisville and University of North Carolina before settling on the University of Mississippi (Ole Miss).

== College career ==
As a freshman at Ole Miss in 2014, Haynes played in all 13 games with four starts, recording a school freshman record 7.5 sacks and 31 tackles. As a sophomore, he was named second-team All-Southeastern Conference after he started 12 of 13 games, finishing with 43 tackles and 10 sacks.

== Professional career ==
Pre-draft measurables
Height	Weight	Arm length	Hand span	40-yard dash	10-yard split	20-yard split	20-yard shuttle	Three-cone drill	Vertical jump	Broad jump	Bench press
6 ft 2 3/8 in (1.89 m)	235 lb (107 kg)	33 1/4 in (0.84 m)	10 in (0.25 m)	4.56 s	1.59 s	2.68 s	4.45 s	7.14 s	32.0 in (0.81 m)	10 ft 3 in (3.12 m)	23 reps
All values from NFL Combine/Pro Day

=== Carolina Panthers (first stint) ===
Haynes was selected by the Carolina Panthers in the fourth round (136th overall) of the 2018 NFL draft. On November 27, 2021, Haynes was placed on the COVID-19 reserve list along with three others.

On March 15, 2022, Haynes signed a two-year contract extension with the Panthers. In Week 3 against the New Orleans Saints, Haynes scored his first career touchdown in the first quarter. After Frankie Luvu caused an Alvin Kamara fumble, Haynes returned the ball 44 yards for the score.

On September 4, 2023, Haynes was placed on injured reserve. Haynes was activated on November 9.

=== Arizona Cardinals ===
On August 6, 2024, Haynes signed with the Arizona Cardinals, but was waived three days later.

=== Carolina Panthers (second stint) ===
On October 4, 2024, the Panthers signed Haynes to their practice squad. He was promoted to the active roster on October 12. He was released on October 22.

Haynes announced his retirement from the NFL on December 10, 2025.
