= 2016 Georgia Bulldogs football team =

American college football season

2016 Georgia Bulldogs football

Liberty Bowl champion

Liberty Bowl, W 31–23 vs. TCU
- Conference: Southeastern Conference
- Eastern Division
- Record: 8–5 (4–4 SEC)
- Head coach: Kirby Smart (1st season)
- Offensive coordinator: Jim Chaney (1st season)
- Co-offensive coordinator: James Coley (1st season)
- Offensive scheme: Pro-style
- Defensive coordinator: Mel Tucker (1st season)
- Base defense: 3–4
- Captains: Nick Chubb; Brandon Kublanow; Sony Michel; Maurice Smith
- Home stadium: Sanford Stadium

2016 Southeastern Conference football standings
	Conf.			Overall
Team	W		L	W		L
Eastern Division
No. 14 Florida x	6	–	2	9	–	4
No. 22 Tennessee	4	–	4	9	–	4
Georgia	4	–	4	8	–	5
Kentucky	4	–	4	7	–	6
South Carolina	3	–	5	6	–	7
Vanderbilt	3	–	5	6	–	7
Missouri*	2	–	6	4	–	8
Western Division
No. 2 Alabama x$^	8	–	0	14	–	1
No. 24 Auburn	5	–	3	8	–	5
No. 13 LSU	5	–	3	8	–	4
Texas A&M	4	–	4	8	–	5
Arkansas	3	–	5	7	–	6
Mississippi State	3	–	5	6	–	7
Ole Miss*	2	–	6	5	–	7
Championship: Alabama 54, Florida 16
^ – College Football Playoff participant; $ – Conference champion; x – Division champion/co-champions; * Ole Miss and Missouri vacated all wins due to NCAA violations.; Rankings from AP Poll

The 2016 Georgia Bulldogs football team represented the University of Georgia in the 2016 NCAA Division I FBS football season. The Bulldogs played their home games at Sanford Stadium. They were members of the Eastern Division of the Southeastern Conference. They were led by first-year head coach Kirby Smart. They finished the season 8–5, 4–4 in SEC play to finish in a three-way tie for second place in the Eastern Division. They were invited to the Liberty Bowl where they defeated TCU.

== Coaching changes ==
After the 2015 regular season, Georgia's athletic director Greg McGarity fired head coach Mark Richt after 15 seasons with an overall 145–51 record. Richt was replaced with former Georgia football player Kirby Smart, who, at the time, was Alabama's defensive coordinator. Smart played for the Bulldogs from 1995 to 1998 for coaches Ray Goff and Jim Donnan and was defensive coordinator at Alabama from 2008 to 2015 under head coach Nick Saban. Jeremy Pruitt, who was defensive coordinator for Georgia from 2014 to 2015, accepted a position as the defensive coordinator for Alabama to replace Smart.

== 2016 recruiting class ==
College recruiting (2016)
Name	Hometown	School	Height	Weight	Commit date
Isaac Nauta #1 TE	Bradenton, FL	IMG Academy	6 ft 4 in (1.93 m)	235 lb (107 kg)	Jan 9, 2016
Isaac Nauta #1 TE	Recruit ratings: Scout: Rivals: 247Sports: ESPN:				
Mecole Hardman #2 ATH	Elberton, GA	Elbert County High School	5 ft 10 in (1.78 m)	171 lb (78 kg)	Feb 3, 2016
Mecole Hardman #2 ATH	Recruit ratings: Scout: Rivals: 247Sports: ESPN:				
Jacob Eason #1 QB	Lake Stevens, WA	Lake Stevens High School	6 ft 5 in (1.96 m)	207 lb (94 kg)	Jul 9, 2014
Jacob Eason #1 QB	Recruit ratings: Scout: Rivals: 247Sports: ESPN:				
Charlie Woerner #4 ATH	Tiger, GA	Rabun County High School	6 ft 5 in (1.96 m)	220 lb (100 kg)	Jul 23, 2015
Charlie Woerner #4 ATH	Recruit ratings: Scout: Rivals: 247Sports: ESPN:				
Javon Wims #3 WR (JC)	Miami, FL	Hinds C.C. (MS)	6 ft 4 in (1.93 m)	205 lb (93 kg)	Nov 8, 2015
Javon Wims #3 WR (JC)	Recruit ratings: Scout: Rivals: 247Sports: ESPN:				
Julian Rochester #8 DT	Powder Springs, GA	McEachern High School	6 ft 5 in (1.96 m)	327 lb (148 kg)	May 28, 2015
Julian Rochester #8 DT	Recruit ratings: Scout: Rivals: 247Sports: ESPN:				
Riley Ridley #39 WR	Deerfield Beach, FL	Deerfield Beach High School	6 ft 1 in (1.85 m)	190 lb (86 kg)	Jan 7, 2016
Riley Ridley #39 WR	Recruit ratings: Scout: Rivals: 247Sports: ESPN:				
Chauncey Manac #17 DE	Homerville, GA	Clinch County High School	6 ft 3 in (1.91 m)	252 lb (114 kg)	Sep 27, 2014
Chauncey Manac #17 DE	Recruit ratings: Scout: Rivals: 247Sports: ESPN:				
Jaleel Laguins #11 ILB	Watkinsville, GA	Oconee County High School	6 ft 1 in (1.85 m)	210 lb (95 kg)	Aug 8, 2015
Jaleel Laguins #11 ILB	Recruit ratings: Scout: Rivals: 247Sports: ESPN:				
Elijah Holyfield #11 RB	Atlanta, GA	Woodward Academy	5 ft 10 in (1.78 m)	195 lb (88 kg)	Sep 4, 2015
Elijah Holyfield #11 RB	Recruit ratings: Scout: Rivals: 247Sports: ESPN:				
Ben Cleveland #13 OG	Toccoa, GA	Stephens County High School	6 ft 6 in (1.98 m)	327 lb (148 kg)	Jul 9, 2014
Ben Cleveland #13 OG	Recruit ratings: Scout: Rivals: 247Sports: ESPN:				
Tyler Clark #30 DT	Americus, GA	Americus-Sumter County High School	6 ft 3 in (1.91 m)	290 lb (130 kg)	May 15, 2015
Tyler Clark #30 DT	Recruit ratings: Scout: Rivals: 247Sports: ESPN:				
Michail Carter #9 DT	Jackson, GA	Jackson High School	6 ft 3 in (1.91 m)	288 lb (131 kg)	Feb 3, 2016
Michail Carter #9 DT	Recruit ratings: Scout: Rivals: 247Sports: ESPN:				
Tyler Simmons #87 WR	Powder Springs, GA	McEachern High School	5 ft 11 in (1.80 m)	191 lb (87 kg)	Feb 3, 2016
Tyler Simmons #87 WR	Recruit ratings: Scout: Rivals: 247Sports: ESPN:				
Tyrique McGhee #45 CB	Fort Valley, GA	Peach County High School	5 ft 10 in (1.78 m)	168 lb (76 kg)	Feb 22, 2015
Tyrique McGhee #45 CB	Recruit ratings: Scout: Rivals: 247Sports: ESPN:				
David Marshall #25 DT	Thomaston, GA	Upson-Lee High School	6 ft 3 in (1.91 m)	255 lb (116 kg)	Feb 3, 2016
David Marshall #25 DT	Recruit ratings: Scout: Rivals: 247Sports: ESPN:				
Solomon Kindley #40 OG	Jacksonville, FL	Raines High School	6 ft 5 in (1.96 m)	345 lb (156 kg)	Jan 25, 2016
Solomon Kindley #40 OG	Recruit ratings: Scout: Rivals: 247Sports: ESPN:				
Chad Clay #18 CB	Suwanee, GA	Peachtree Ridge High School	5 ft 11 in (1.80 m)	169 lb (77 kg)	May 8, 2015
Chad Clay #18 CB	Recruit ratings: Scout: Rivals: 247Sports: ESPN:				
Chris Barnes #19 OG	Leesburg, GA	Lee County High School	6 ft 3 in (1.91 m)	274 lb (124 kg)	Apr 11, 2015
Chris Barnes #19 OG	Recruit ratings: Scout: Rivals: 247Sports: ESPN:				
Marshall Long #10 K	China Grove, NC	South Rowan High School	6 ft 4 in (1.93 m)	230 lb (100 kg)	Jan 31, 2016
Marshall Long #10 K	Recruit ratings: Scout: Rivals: 247Sports: ESPN:				
Overall recruit ranking: Scout: 10 Rivals: 9 247Sports: 7 ESPN: 7
Note: In many cases, Scout, Rivals, 247Sports, On3, and ESPN may conflict in their listings of height and weight.; In these cases, the average was taken. ESPN grades are on a 100-point scale.; Sources: "2016 Team Ranking". Rivals.com.

National Signing Day was on February 3, 2016.

== Schedule ==
Georgia announced its 2016 football schedule on October 29, 2015. The 2016 schedule consisted of 6 home, 4 away, and 2 neutral site games in the regular season. The Bulldogs hosted SEC foes Auburn, Tennessee, and Vanderbilt, and traveled to Kentucky, Missouri, Ole Miss, and South Carolina. Georgia went against Florida in Jacksonville, Florida.

The Bulldogs had hosted three of their four non–conference games, which were against Georgia Tech Yellow Jackets and the North Carolina Tar Heels both from the Atlantic Coast Conference, Louisiana–Lafayette Ragin' Cajuns from the Sun Belt Conference, and Nicholls State Colonels from the Southland Conference.

Date	Time	Opponent	Rank	Site	TV	Result	Attendance
September 3	5:30 p.m.	vs. No. 22 North Carolina*	No. 18	Georgia Dome; Atlanta, GA (Chick-fil-A Kickoff Game)	ESPN	W 33–24	75,405
September 10	12:00 p.m.	Nicholls State*	No. 9	Sanford Stadium; Athens, GA	SECN	W 26–24	92,746
September 17	7:30 p.m.	at Missouri	No. 16	Faurot Field; Columbia, MO	SECN	W 28–27	57,098
September 24	12:00 p.m.	at No. 23 Ole Miss	No. 12	Vaught–Hemingway Stadium; Oxford, MS	ESPN	L 14–45	65,483
October 1	3:30 p.m.	No. 11 Tennessee	No. 25	Sanford Stadium; Athens, GA (rivalry / SEC Nation)	CBS	L 31–34	92,746
October 9^{[a]}	2:30 p.m.	at South Carolina		Williams-Brice Stadium; Columbia, SC (rivalry)	SECN	W 28–14	77,221
October 15	12:00 p.m.	Vanderbilt^{†}		Sanford Stadium; Athens, GA (rivalry)	SECN	L 16–17	92,746
October 29	3:30 p.m.	vs. No. 14 Florida		EverBank Field; Jacksonville, FL (rivalry / SEC Nation)	CBS	L 10–24	84,681
November 5	7:30 p.m.	at Kentucky		Commonwealth Stadium; Lexington, KY	SECN	W 27–24	62,507
November 12	3:30 p.m.	No. 8 Auburn		Sanford Stadium; Athens, GA (Deep South's Oldest Rivalry)	CBS	W 13–7	92,746
November 19	12:00 p.m.	Louisiana–Lafayette*		Sanford Stadium; Athens, GA	SECN	W 35–21	92,746
November 26	12:00 p.m.	Georgia Tech*		Sanford Stadium; Athens, GA (Clean, Old-Fashioned Hate)	SECN	L 27–28	92,746
December 30	12:00 p.m.	vs. TCU*		Liberty Bowl Memorial Stadium; Memphis, TN (Liberty Bowl)	ESPN	W 31–23	51,087
*Non-conference game; ^{†}Homecoming; Rankings from AP Poll released prior to game; All times are in Eastern time

^{^[a]}The game between Georgia and South Carolina had been originally scheduled for October 8, 2016, but was postponed due to Hurricane Matthew and played on October 9, 2016.

== Game summaries ==
=== vs North Carolina ===
	1	2	3	4	Total
#22 Tar Heels	0	10	14	0	24
#18 Bulldogs	7	7	9	10	33

=== Nicholls State ===
	1	2	3	4	Total
Colonels	0	7	7	10	24
#9 Bulldogs	7	3	16	0	26

=== At Missouri ===
	1	2	3	4	Total
#16 Bulldogs	7	14	0	7	28
Tigers	10	10	7	0	27

=== At Ole Miss ===
	1	2	3	4	Total
#12 Bulldogs	0	0	7	7	14
#23 Rebels	17	14	14	0	45

=== Tennessee ===
Georgia vs. Tennessee at Sanford Stadium

	1	2	3	4	Total
#11 Volunteers	0	7	7	20	34
#25 Bulldogs	7	10	7	7	31

=== At South Carolina ===
	1	2	3	4	Total
Bulldogs	7	7	0	14	28
Gamecocks	0	0	7	7	14

=== Vanderbilt ===
	1	2	3	4	Total
Commodores	7	0	3	7	17
Bulldogs	3	3	7	3	16

=== vs Florida ===
	1	2	3	4	Total
Gators	7	7	7	3	24
Bulldogs	3	7	0	0	10

=== At Kentucky ===
	1	2	3	4	Total
Bulldogs	7	6	3	11	27
Wildcats	7	7	7	3	24

=== Auburn ===
Auburn Tigers (7–2) at Georgia Bulldogs (5–4)

Quarter	1	2	3	4	Total
Auburn	7	0	0	0	7
Georgia	0	0	7	6	13

at Sanford Stadium • Athens, Georgia

- Date: November 12
- Game time: 3:30 p.m. EDT
- Game weather: Fair • 62 °F (17 °C) • Wind gusts 20 miles per hour (32 km/h; 17 kn)
- Game attendance: 92,746
- Referee: Ken Williamson
- Box Score

=== Louisiana–Lafayette ===
	1	2	3	4	Total
Ragin' Cajuns	0	7	0	14	21
Bulldogs	14	7	7	7	35

=== Georgia Tech ===
	1	2	3	4	Total
Yellow Jackets	7	7	0	14	28
Bulldogs	7	7	13	0	27

This game is Georgia's most recent loss to Georgia Tech.

=== TCU–Liberty Bowl ===
	1	2	3	4	Total
Bulldogs	7	7	7	10	31
Horned Frogs	9	7	7	0	23

== Roster ==
2016 Georgia Bulldogs football team roster
Players
Coaches
Offense

Pos.	#	Name	Class
RB	1	Sony Michel	Jr
WR	2	Jayson Stanley	So
QB	2	Sam Vaughn	So
WR	4	Mecole Hardman	Fr
WR	5	Terry Godwin	So
WR	6	Javon Wims	Jr
WR	8	Riley Ridley	Fr
WR	9	Kenneth Towns	Sr
QB	10	Jacob Eason	Fr
QB	11	Greyson Lambert	Sr
QB	12	Brice Ramsey	Jr
RB	13	Elijah Holyfield	Fr
QB	14	Parker McLeod	Jr
WR	16	Isaiah McKenzie	Jr
WR	17	Josh Moran	Fr
TE	18	Isaac Nauta	Fr
WR	19	Willie Erdman	Fr
RB	22	Brendan Douglas	Sr
RB	22	Avery McNeely	Jr
WR	23	Shakenneth Williams	Fr
RB	24	Prather Hudson	Fr
WR	25	Steven Van Tiflin	So
WR	26	Patrick Burke	Fr
RB	27	Nick Chubb	Jr
WR	28	Shaquery Wilson	So
WR	29	Matt Price	So
RB	30	Tae Crowder	Fr
RB	33	Ian Donald-McIntyre	Fr
RB	35	Brian Herrien	Fr
RB	37	Shavoyae Brown	Fr
FB	43	Nick Moore	So
TE	44	Justin Hurston	Fr
FB	46	Glenn Welch	Jr
FB	47	Christian Payne	Jr
FB	48	Kyle LeStrange	Sr
FB	49	Turner Fortin	Fr
OL	53	Lamont Gaillard	So
OL	54	Brandon Kublanow	Sr
OL	55	Dyshon Sims	Jr
OL	56	Billy Seward	Jr
OL	57	Daniel Gothard	Fr
OL	58	Pat Allen	Fr
OL	60	Murko Jurkovich	Fr
OL	61	Chris Barnes	Fr
OL	63	Sage Hardin	Fr
OL	65	Kendall Baker	So
OL	66	Solomon Kindley	Fr
OL	67	Sam Madden	Fr
OL	68	Sean Fogarty	So
OL	70	Aulden Bynum	Jr
OL	72	Tyler Catalina	Sr
OL	73	Greg Pyke	Sr
OL	74	Ben Cleveland	Fr
OL	75	Thomas Swilley	Jr
OL	77	Isaiah Wynn	Jr
WR	80	Charlie Hegedus	Sr
WR	82	Michael Chigbu	So
TE	83	Jeb Blazevich	Jr
WR	84	Wyatt Payne	Fr
TE	85	Jordan Davis	Jr
WR	86	Davis Kelly	Fr
TE	86	Wix Patton	Fr
TE	87	Miles McGinty	So
WR	87	Tyler Simmons	Fr
TE	88	Jackson Harris	So
TE	89	Charlie Woerner	Fr

Defense

Pos.	#	Name	Class
DB	2	Maurice Smith	Sr
LB	3	Roquan Smith	So
DL	5	Julian Rochester	Fr
LB	6	Natrez Patrick	So
LB	7	Lorenzo Carter	Jr
LB	8	Shaun McGee	Fr
DB	9	Reggie Wilkerson	Fr
DL	10	Malik Herring	Fr
LB	11	Keyon Brown	So
DB	12	Juwan Briscoe	So
DL	13	Jonathan Ledbetter	So
DB	14	Malkom Parrish	Jr
LB	15	D'Andre Walker	So
DB	16	Caleeb Roberson	Fr
LB	17	Davin Bellamy	Jr
DB	18	Deandre Baker	Jr
DB	19	Jarvis Wilson	So
DB	20	Quincy Mauger	Sr
DB	20	J. R. Reed	So
DB	24	Dominick Sanders	Jr
LB	25	Jaleel Laguins	Fr
DB	26	Tyrique McGhee	Fr
DB	28	KJ Smith	Fr
DB	28	Otamere Enadeghe	So
DB	29	Tim Hill	Sr
DB	31	Shattle Fenteng	Sr
LB	32	Ridge Underwood	Sr
DB	33	Kirby Choates	So
DB	35	Aaron Davis	Jr
DB	36	Rico McGraw	So
DB	37	Jordon McKinney	Fr
LB	38	Ryne Rankin	Sr
LB	39	Rashad Roundtree	So
LB	41	Chuks Amaechi	Sr
LB	43	Tommy Long	Sr
LB	44	Juwan Taylor	Jr
LB	45	Reggie Carter	Jr
LB	46	Michael Keene	Fr
LB	47	Daniel Harper	So
DB	48	Jonah Guinn	Sr
DL	49	Koby Pyrz	Fr
LB	50	Johnny O'Neal	Sr
LB	51	David Marshall	Fr
DL	52	Tyler Clark	Fr
LB	55	Jacob Gross	So
DL	57	Alex Essex	So
DL	76	Michail Carter	Fr
DL	78	Trenton Thompson	So
LB	91	Chauncey Manac	Fr
DL	92	Justin Young	Fr
DL	93	Carson Hall	Sr
DL	94	Michael Barnett	So
DL	96	DaQuan Hawkins-Muckle	So
DL	97	John Atkins	Jr

Special teams

Pos.	#	Name	Class
LS	56	John Courson	So
LS	59	Matthew Herzwurm	Jr
LS	69	Trent Frix	Jr
K	92	William Ham	So
K	94	Thomas Pritchard	Sr
P	95	Marshall Long	Fr
LS	96	Hudson Reynolds	Fr
P	97	Will Cowart	So
K	98	Rodrigo Blankenship	Fr
K	99	Mitchell Wasson	Fr

Head coach

- Kirby Smart

Coordinators/assistant coaches

- Jim Chaney – Offensive Coordinator/Tight Ends
- Mel Tucker – Defensive Coordinator/Secondary
- James Coley — Co-Offensive Coordinator/Quarterbacks
- Will Windham — Quality Control, Defense
- Jonas Jennings – Director, Player Development

Legend

- (C) Team captain
- (S) Suspended
- (I) Ineligible
- Injured
- Redshirt

Roster
Last update: 10/25/18

== Rankings ==
Ranking movements Legend: ██ Increase in ranking ██ Decrease in ranking — = Not ranked RV = Received votes
	Week															
Poll	Pre	1	2	3	4	5	6	7	8	9	10	11	12	13	14	Final
AP	18	9	16	12	25	RV	RV	—	—	—	—	—	—	—	—	—
Coaches	16	9	13	11	20	RV	RV	—	—	—	—	—	—	—	—	RV
CFP	Not released									—	—	—	—	—	—	Not released
