= 2018 Georgia Bulldogs football team =

American college football season

2018 Georgia Bulldogs football

SEC Eastern Division champion

SEC Championship Game, L 28–35 vs. Alabama

Sugar Bowl, L 21–28 vs. Texas
- Conference: Southeastern Conference
- East Division

Ranking
- Coaches: No. 8
- AP: No. 7 (tie)
- Record: 11–3 (7–1 SEC)
- Head coach: Kirby Smart (3rd season)
- Offensive coordinator: Jim Chaney (3rd season)
- Co-offensive coordinator: James Coley (3rd season)
- Offensive scheme: Pro-style
- Defensive coordinator: Mel Tucker (3rd season)
- Base defense: 3–4
- Home stadium: Sanford Stadium

2018 Southeastern Conference football standings
| | Conf. | | | Overall |
| Team | W | | L | W | | L |
|---|---|---|---|---|---|---|
Eastern Division
| No. T–7 Georgia x | 7 | – | 1 | 11 | – | 3 |
| No. 12 Kentucky | 5 | – | 3 | 10 | – | 3 |
| No. T–7 Florida | 5 | – | 3 | 10 | – | 3 |
| South Carolina | 4 | – | 4 | 7 | – | 6 |
| Missouri | 4 | – | 4 | 8 | – | 5 |
| Vanderbilt | 3 | – | 5 | 6 | – | 7 |
| Tennessee | 2 | – | 6 | 5 | – | 7 |
Western Division
| No. 2 Alabama x$^ | 8 | – | 0 | 14 | – | 1 |
| No. 16 Texas A&M | 5 | – | 3 | 9 | – | 4 |
| No. 6 LSU | 5 | – | 3 | 10 | – | 3 |
| Mississippi State* | 4 | – | 4 | 8 | – | 5 |
| Auburn | 3 | – | 5 | 8 | – | 5 |
| Ole Miss | 1 | – | 7 | 5 | – | 7 |
| Arkansas | 0 | – | 8 | 2 | – | 10 |
Championship: Alabama 35, Georgia 28
^ – College Football Playoff participant; $ – Conference champion; x – Division champion/co-champions; * Mississippi State vacated four conference and eight total wins due to NCAA violations.; Rankings from AP Poll

The 2018 Georgia Bulldogs football team represented the University of Georgia during the 2018 NCAA Division I FBS football season. The Bulldogs played their home games at Sanford Stadium and competed as members of the Eastern Division of the Southeastern Conference. They were led by third-year head coach Kirby Smart.

Georgia entered the 2018 season as defending SEC champions and the previous season's national runners-up, and they were ranked third in the 2018 preseason AP Poll. The Bulldogs won their first six games by an average margin of victory of 30 points but suffered their first loss on the road against LSU. The team rebounded with victories over No. 9 Florida and No. 11 Kentucky, and secured their place in the 2018 SEC Championship Game as champions of the East Division. The game was a rematch of the 2018 College Football Playoff National Championship against West Division champion Alabama, and the results of the games matched as Alabama once again came from behind to win the 2018 match-up. Georgia was left just outside the top four in the final CFP rankings, and they were invited to the Sugar Bowl to play Big 12 Conference runner-up Texas. The Bulldogs were upset by the Longhorns 28–21 and finished the year with a record of 11–3.

The Bulldogs were led on offense by sophomore quarterback Jake Fromm, who finished the year with 2,761 passing yards and 30 passing touchdowns. Fromm finished in second in the conference behind Alabama's Tua Tagovailoa in passing touchdowns and passing efficiency rating (171.3). On the ground, D'Andre Swift and Elijah Holyfield each finished with more than 1,000 rushing yards, the second consecutive year that Georgia had two 1,000-yard backs. On defense, cornerback Deandre Baker was a consensus first-team All-American and the recipient of the Jim Thorpe Award.

== Recruiting ==
=== 2018 recruiting class ===
College recruiting
| Name | Hometown | School | Height | Weight | Commit date |
|---|---|---|---|---|---|
| Justin Fields; QB | Kennesaw, GA | Harrison | 6 ft 3 in (1.91 m) | 221 lb (100 kg) | Oct 6, 2017 |
| Justin Fields; QB | Recruit ratings: Scout: Rivals: 247Sports: ESPN: (94) | | | | |
| Tyson Campbell; CB | Plantation, FL | American Heritage | 6 ft 3 in (1.91 m) | 181 lb (82 kg) | Feb 7, 2018 |
| Tyson Campbell; CB | Recruit ratings: Scout: Rivals: 247Sports: ESPN: (91) | | | | |
| Zamir White; RB | Laurinburg, NC | Scotland | 6 ft 0 in (1.83 m) | 205 lb (93 kg) | Jun 27, 2017 |
| Zamir White; RB | Recruit ratings: Scout: Rivals: 247Sports: ESPN: (89) | | | | |
| Jamaree Salyer; OG | Atlanta, GA | Pace Academy | 6 ft 4 in (1.93 m) | 342 lb (155 kg) | Dec 20, 2017 |
| Jamaree Salyer; OG | Recruit ratings: Scout: Rivals: 247Sports: ESPN: (87) | | | | |
| Cade Mays; OT | Knoxville, TN | Knoxville Catholic | 6 ft 6 in (1.98 m) | 327 lb (148 kg) | Dec 20, 2017 |
| Cade Mays; OT | Recruit ratings: Scout: Rivals: 247Sports: ESPN: (88) | | | | |
| Adam Anderson; OLB | Rome, GA | Rome | 6 ft 4 in (1.93 m) | 214 lb (97 kg) | Oct 19, 2017 |
| Adam Anderson; OLB | Recruit ratings: Scout: Rivals: 247Sports: ESPN: (85) | | | | |
| Brenton Cox Jr. DE | Stockbridge, GA | Stockbridge High School | 6 ft 5 in (1.96 m) | 250 lb (110 kg) | Dec 20, 2017 |
| Brenton Cox Jr. DE | Recruit ratings: Scout: Rivals: 247Sports: ESPN: (90) | | | | |
| Trey Hill; OG | Warner Robins, GA | Houston County | 6 ft 5 in (1.96 m) | 346 lb (157 kg) | Dec 11, 2017 |
| Trey Hill; OG | Recruit ratings: Scout: Rivals: 247Sports: ESPN: (87) | | | | |
| Quay Walker; OLB | Cordele, GA | Crisp County | 6 ft 4 in (1.93 m) | 236 lb (107 kg) | Feb 7, 2018 |
| Quay Walker; OLB | Recruit ratings: Scout: Rivals: 247Sports: ESPN: (85) | | | | |
| Otis Reese IV; OLB | Leesburg, GA | Lee County | 6 ft 4 in (1.93 m) | 206 lb (93 kg) | Feb 7, 2018 |
| Otis Reese IV; OLB | Recruit ratings: Scout: Rivals: 247Sports: ESPN: (82) | | | | |
| Channing Tindall; ILB | Columbia, SC | Spring Valley | 6 ft 3 in (1.91 m) | 213 lb (97 kg) | Dec 21, 2017 |
| Channing Tindall; ILB | Recruit ratings: Scout: Rivals: 247Sports: ESPN: (82) | | | | |
| James Cook; RB | Miami, FL | Miami Central | 6 ft 0 in (1.83 m) | 182 lb (83 kg) | Oct 26, 2017 |
| James Cook; RB | Recruit ratings: Scout: Rivals: 247Sports: ESPN: (85) | | | | |
| Kearis Jackson; WR | Fort Valley, GA | Peach County | 6 ft 1 in (1.85 m) | 203 lb (92 kg) | Aug 19, 2017 |
| Kearis Jackson; WR | Recruit ratings: Scout: Rivals: 247Sports: ESPN: (87) | | | | |
| Luke Ford; OG | Carterville, IL | Carterville | 6 ft 6 in (1.98 m) | 245 lb (111 kg) | Dec 21, 2017 |
| Luke Ford; OG | Recruit ratings: Scout: Rivals: 247Sports: ESPN: (85) | | | | |
| Azeez Ojulari; OLB | Marietta, GA | Marietta | 6 ft 3 in (1.91 m) | 222 lb (101 kg) | Aug 17, 2017 |
| Azeez Ojulari; OLB | Recruit ratings: Scout: Rivals: 247Sports: ESPN: (81) | | | | |
| Warren Ericson; OG | Suwanee, GA | North Gwinnett | 6 ft 4 in (1.93 m) | 317 lb (144 kg) | Jun 2, 2017 |
| Warren Ericson; OG | Recruit ratings: Scout: Rivals: 247Sports: ESPN: (81) | | | | |
| Divaad Wilson; CB | Miami, FL | Miami Northwestern | 6 ft 2 in (1.88 m) | 208 lb (94 kg) | Dec 20, 2017 |
| Divaad Wilson; CB | Recruit ratings: Scout: Rivals: 247Sports: ESPN: (81) | | | | |
| Nadab Joseph; CB | Miami, FL | Miami Norland High School | 6 ft 2 in (1.88 m) | 180 lb (82 kg) | Dec 20, 2017 |
| Nadab Joseph; CB | Recruit ratings: Scout: Rivals: 247Sports: ESPN: (82) | | | | |
| Devonte Wyatt; DT | Decatur, GA | Hutchinson Community College | 6 ft 3 in (1.91 m) | 300 lb (140 kg) | Dec 20, 2017 |
| Devonte Wyatt; DT | Recruit ratings: Scout: Rivals: 247Sports: ESPN: (80) | | | | |
| Tommy Bush; WR | Schertz, TX | Samuel Clemens High School | 6 ft 5 in (1.96 m) | 195 lb (88 kg) | Feb 7, 2018 |
| Tommy Bush; WR | Recruit ratings: Scout: Rivals: 247Sports: ESPN: (85) | | | | |
Overall recruit ranking: Scout: 1 Rivals: 1 247Sports: 1 ESPN: 1
Note: In many cases, Scout, Rivals, 247Sports, On3, and ESPN may conflict in their listings of height and weight.; In these cases, the average was taken. ESPN grades are on a 100-point scale.; Sources: "2018 Team Ranking". Rivals.com.

== Preseason ==
=== Award watch lists ===
Listed in the order that they were released

| Award | Player | Position | Year |
|---|---|---|---|
| Lott Trophy | Deandre Baker | CB | SR |
| Rimington Trophy | Lamont Gaillard | C | SR |
| Chuck Bednarik Award | Deandre Baker | CB | SR |
| Maxwell Award | Jake Fromm | QB | SO |
| Maxwell Award | D'Andre Swift | RB | SO |
| Doak Walker Award | D'Andre Swift | RB | SO |
| John Mackey Award | Isaac Nauta | TE | JR |
| Butkus Award | D'Andre Walker | LB | JR |
| Jim Thorpe Award | Deandre Baker | CB | SR |
| Jim Thorpe Award | J. R. Reed | CB | JR |
| Bronko Nagurski Trophy | Jonathan Ledbetter | DE | SR |
| Outland Trophy | Lamont Gaillard | C | SR |
| Lou Groza Award | Rodrigo Blankenship | K | JR |
| Paul Hornung Award | Mecole Hardman | WR/KR | JR |
| Wuerffel Trophy | Rodrigo Blankenship | K | JR |
| Ted Hendricks Award | Jonathan Ledbetter | DE | SR |

=== SEC media poll ===
The SEC media poll was released on July 20, 2018, with the Bulldogs predicted to win the SEC East Division.

=== Preseason All-SEC teams ===
The Bulldogs had twelve players selected to the preseason all-SEC teams.

Offense

2nd team

D'Andre Swift – RB

Terry Godwin – WR

Isaac Nauta – TE

Andrew Thomas – OL

Lamont Gaillard – C

3rd team

Jake Fromm – QB

Defense

1st team

Deandre Baker – DB

J. R. Reed – DB

2nd team

Jonathan Ledbetter – DL

D'Andre Walker – LB

Specialists

1st team

Rodrigo Blankenship – K

2nd team

Mecole Hardman – RET

== Schedule ==
| Date | Time | Opponent | Rank | Site | TV | Result | Attendance |
|---|---|---|---|---|---|---|---|
| September 1 | 3:40 p.m. | No. 22 (FCS) Austin Peay* | No. 3 | Sanford Stadium; Athens, GA | ESPN | W 45–0 | 92,746 |
| September 8 | 3:30 p.m. | at No. 24 South Carolina | No. 3 | Williams–Brice Stadium; Columbia, SC (rivalry, SEC Nation) | CBS | W 41–17 | 83,140 |
| September 15 | 12:00 p.m. | Middle Tennessee* | No. 3 | Sanford Stadium; Athens, GA | ESPNews | W 49–7 | 92,746 |
| September 22 | 12:00 p.m. | at Missouri | No. 2 | Faurot Field; Columbia, MO | ESPN | W 43–29 | 58,284 |
| September 29 | 3:30 p.m. | Tennessee | No. 2 | Sanford Stadium; Athens, GA (rivalry) | CBS | W 38–12 | 92,746 |
| October 6 | 7:30 p.m. | Vanderbilt | No. 2 | Sanford Stadium; Athens, GA (rivalry) | SECN | W 41–13 | 92,746 |
| October 13 | 3:30 p.m. | at No. 13 LSU | No. 2 | Tiger Stadium; Baton Rouge, LA | CBS | L 16–36 | 102,321 |
| October 27 | 3:30 p.m. | vs. No. 9 Florida | No. 7 | TIAA Bank Field; Jacksonville, FL (rivalry, College GameDay) | CBS | W 36–17 | 84,463 |
| November 3 | 3:30 p.m. | at No. 9 Kentucky | No. 6 | Kroger Field; Lexington, KY (SEC Nation) | CBS | W 34–17 | 63,543 |
| November 10 | 7:00 p.m. | No. 24 Auburn | No. 5 | Sanford Stadium; Athens, GA (Deep South's Oldest Rivalry) | ESPN | W 27–10 | 95,726 |
| November 17 | 4:00 p.m. | UMass* | No. 5 | Sanford Stadium; Athens, GA (SEC Nation) | SECN | W 66–27 | 92,556 |
| November 24 | 12:00 p.m. | Georgia Tech* | No. 5 | Sanford Stadium; Athens, GA (Clean, Old-Fashioned Hate) | SECN | W 45–21 | 92,746 |
| December 1 | 4:00 p.m. | vs. No. 1 Alabama | No. 4 | Mercedes-Benz Stadium; Atlanta, GA (SEC Championship Game, rivalry, College GameDay, SEC Nation) | CBS | L 28–35 | 77,141 |
| January 1, 2019 | 8:30 p.m. | vs. No. 15 Texas* | No. 5 | Mercedes-Benz Superdome; New Orleans, LA (Sugar Bowl) | ESPN | L 21–28 | 71,449 |
*Non-conference game; Rankings from AP Poll and CFP Rankings after October 30 released prior to game; All times are in Eastern time

== Roster ==
2018 Georgia Bulldogs football team roster
Players
Coaches
Offense

| Pos. | # | Name | Class |
|---|---|---|---|
| QB | 1 | Justin Fields | Fr |
| WR | 2 | Jayson Stanley | Sr |
| RB | 3 | Zamir White | Fr |
| WR | 4 | Mecole Hardman | Jr |
| QB | 4 | Mason Wood | Fr |
| WR | 5 | Terry Godwin | Sr |
| RB | 6 | James Cook | Fr |
| RB | 7 | D'Andre Swift | So |
| WR | 8 | Riley Ridley | Jr |
| WR | 9 | Jeremiah Holloman | So |
| WR | 10 | Kearis Jackson | Fr |
| QB | 11 | Jake Fromm | So |
| WR | 12 | Tommy Bush | Fr |
| RB | 13 | Elijah Holyfield | Jr |
| WR | 14 | Trey Blount | So |
| WR | 15 | Matt Landers | Fr |
| WR | 16 | Demetris Robertson | So |
| QB | 16 | John Seter | Fr |
| QB | 17 | Matthew Downing | Fr |
| WR | 17 | Josh Moran | So |
| TE | 18 | Isaac Nauta | Jr |
| WR | 19 | Willie Erdman | So |
| RB | 24 | Prather Hudson | So |
| WR | 25 | Ahkil Crumpton | Sr |
| WR | 26 | Patrick Burke | So |
| RB | 29 | Lofton Tidwell | Fr |
| WR | 30 | Ed Ferguson | Fr |
| WR | 31 | Reid Tulowitzky | Fr |
| WR | 32 | Jaylen Johnson | Fr |
| RB | 33 | Ian Donald-McIntyre | So |
| RB | 35 | Brian Herrien | Jr |
| RB | 36 | Garrett Jones | Fr |
| WR | 37 | Patrick Bond | Fr |
| TE | 42 | Mitchell Werntz | Fr |
| TE | 44 | Peyton Mercer | Fr |
| TE | 45 | Luke Ford | Fr |
| RB | 49 | Darius Jackson | Fr |
| OL | 50 | Warren Ericson | Fr |
| OL | 53 | Lamont Gaillard | Sr |
| OL | 54 | Justin Shaffer | So |
| OL | 55 | Trey Hill | Fr |
| OL | 57 | Daniel Gothard | So |
| OL | 58 | Blake Anderson | Fr |
| OL | 61 | Blake Watson | Fr |
| OL | 65 | Kendall Baker | Sr |
| OL | 66 | Solomon Kindley | So |
| OL | 68 | Sean Fogarty | Sr |
| OL | 69 | Jamaree Salyer | Fr |
| OL | 71 | Andrew Thomas | So |
| OL | 74 | Ben Cleveland | So |
| OL | 75 | Owen Condon | Fr |
| OL | 76 | Carson Hall | Sr |
| OL | 77 | Cade Mays | Fr |
| OL | 78 | D'Marcus Hayes | Jr |
| OL | 79 | Isaiah Wilson | Fr |
| WR | 80 | J. T. Dooley | Fr |
| WR | 81 | Steven Van Tiflin | Sr |
| WR | 82 | Michael Chigbu | Jr |
| TE | 83 | Wix Patton | Fr |
| WR | 84 | Wyatt Payne | Jr |
| WR | 85 | Cameron Moore | Fr |
| TE | 86 | John FitzPatrick | Fr |
| WR | 87 | Tyler Simmons | Jr |
| TE | 88 | Jackson Harris | Sr |
| TE | 89 | Charlie Woerner | Jr |

Defense

| Pos. | # | Name | Class |
|---|---|---|---|
| LB | 1 | Brenton Cox Jr. | Fr |
| DB | 2 | Richard LeCounte | So |
| DB | 3 | Tyson Campbell | Fr |
| DL | 5 | Julian Rochester | Jr |
| LB | 6 | Natrez Patrick | Sr |
| DL | 7 | Jay Hayes | Sr |
| DB | 8 | DeAngelo Gibbs | So |
| DB | 9 | Ameer Speed | So |
| DL | 10 | Malik Herring | So |
| LB | 11 | Keyon Richardson | Sr |
| DB | 12 | Tray Bishop | Fr |
| DL | 13 | Jonathan Ledbetter | Sr |
| LB | 15 | D'Andre Walker | Sr |
| DB | 16 | Divaad Wilson | Fr |
| DB | 17 | Otis Reese IV | Fr |
| DB | 18 | Deandre Baker | Sr |
| DB | 19 | Jarvis Wilson | Sr |
| DB | 20 | J. R. Reed | Jr |
| LB | 22 | Nate McBride | So |
| DB | 23 | Mark Webb | So |
| LB | 24 | Matthew Brown | Fr |
| LB | 25 | Quay Walker | Fr |
| DB | 26 | Tyrique McGhee | Jr |
| DB | 27 | Eric Stokes | Fr |
| DB | 29 | Christopher Smith II | Fr |
| LB | 30 | Tae Crowder | Jr |
| DB | 31 | William Poole | So |
| LB | 32 | Monty Rice | So |
| LB | 33 | Robert Beal Jr. | Fr |
| DB | 36 | Latavious Brini | Fr |
| DB | 37 | Jordon McKinney | So |
| LB | 38 | Azeez Ojulari | Fr |
| DB | 39 | Hugh Nelson | Fr |
| LB | 41 | Channing Tindall | Fr |
| DB | 42 | Jake Skole | Fr |
| DB | 43 | Isaac Mize | Sr |
| LB | 44 | Juwan Taylor | Sr |
| DB | 46 | Cameron Hill | Fr |
| LB | 48 | John Eager | Fr |
| DL | 49 | Koby Pyrz | So |
| LB | 51 | David Marshall | Jr |
| DL | 52 | Tyler Clark | Jr |
| LB | 55 | Miles Miccichi | Fr |
| LB | 56 | Adam Anderson | Fr |
| DL | 72 | Netori Johnson | Fr |
| DL | 76 | Michail Carter | Jr |
| LB | 84 | Walter Grant | So |
| LB | 88 | Jaden Hunter | So |
| DL | 91 | Kolby Wyatt | Fr |
| DL | 92 | Justin Young | Jr |
| DL | 93 | Antonio Poole | Jr |
| DL | 94 | Michael Barnett | Jr |
| DL | 95 | Devonte Wyatt | So |
| DL | 96 | DaQuan Hawkins-Muckle | Sr |
| DL | 99 | Jordan Davis | Fr |

Special teams

| Pos. | # | Name | Class |
|---|---|---|---|
| LS | 43 | Nick Moore | Sr |
| LS | 47 | Payne Walker | Fr |
| LS | 56 | Palmer Henderson | Sr |
| K/P | 90 | Jake Camarda | Fr |
| P | 92 | Landon Stratton | Sr |
| P | 93 | Bill Rubright | Fr |
| P | 95 | Marshall Long | So |
| K | 96 | Jack Podlesny | Fr |
| K | 97 | Brooks Buce | Fr |
| K | 98 | Rodrigo Blankenship | Jr |

Head coach

- Kirby Smart

Coordinators/assistant coaches

- Jim Chaney – Offensive Coordinator/Tight Ends
- Mel Tucker – Defensive Coordinator/Secondary
- James Coley – Co-Offensive Coordinator/Quarterbacks
- Scott Fountain – Special Teams Coordinator
- Dell McGee – Assistant Head Coach/Running Backs
- Cortez Hankton– Wide Receivers
- Tray Scott – Defensive Line
- Sam Pittman – Offensive Line
- Glenn Schumann– Inside Linebackers
- Dan Lanning– Outside Linebackers
- Scott Sinclair – Director, Strength and Conditioning
- Ed Ellis – Associate Director of Strength and Conditioning
- Rodney Price – Assistant, Strength and Conditioning
- Ben Sowders – Assistant, Strength and Conditioning
- Patrick Doherty – Quality Control, Offense
- Brian Michalowski – Quality Control, Defense
- Blaine Miller – Quality Control, Defense
- Travares Tillman – Quality Control, Defense
- Josh Lee – Director, Football Operations
- Jay Chapman – Assistant Director of Football Operations
- Neyland Raper – Football Operations Assistant
- Jonas Jennings – Director, Player Development
- Fernando Velasco – Assistant Director, Player Development
- Luke Moore – Director, Player Personnel
- Marshall Malchow – Director, Recruiting
- Lukman Abdulai – Director, Recruiting on Campus
- Christina Harris – Director, Recruiting Administration
- Dacia King – Recruiting Program Coordinator
- Bryant Gantt – Director, Player Wellness
- John Meshad – Director, Player Equipment
- Jake Stroot – Director, Football Technology
- Sidney Roberts – Director, Football Performance Nutrition
- William Price – Assistant Director of Football Performance Nutrition
- Wendel Davis – Graduate Assistant
- Cody Kennedy – Graduate Assistant
- Jesse Stone – Graduate Assistant
- Greg Meyer – Special Teams Analyst
- Hannah Brinks – Director, Football Creative Design
- Eric Black – Director, of Football Creative Design

Legend

- (C) Team captain
- (S) Suspended
- (I) Ineligible
- Injured
- Redshirt

Roster
Last update: 10/25/18

== Game summaries ==
=== No. 22 Austin Peay ===
| | 1 | 2 | 3 | 4 | Total |
|---|---|---|---|---|---|
| No. 22 (FCS) Governors | 0 | 0 | 0 | 0 | 0 |
| No. 3 Bulldogs | 17 | 21 | 7 | 0 | 45 |

=== At No. 24 South Carolina ===
No. 3 Georgia Bulldogs at No. 24 South Carolina Gamecocks – Game summary

| Quarter | 1 | 2 | 3 | 4 | Total |
|---|---|---|---|---|---|
| No. 3 Georgia | 17 | 3 | 21 | 0 | 41 |
| No. 24 South Carolina | 7 | 3 | 0 | 7 | 17 |

at Williams–Brice Stadium • Columbia, South Carolina

- Date: September 8, 2018
- Game time: 3:30 p.m.
- Game weather: Temperature: 92 °F (33 °C) • Wind:SE 5 mph (8.0 km/h) • Weather: Sunny
- Game attendance: 83,140
- Referee: Matt Loeffler
- TV announcers (CBS): Brad Nessler (play-by-play), Gary Danielson (color), Jamie Erdahl (sideline)

Game information

First Quarter

- (14:13) UGA – Taylor 0 yard fumble recovery, Blankenship kick (UGA 7–0)
- (11:50) UGA – Swift 17 yard run, Blankenship kick (UGA 14–0)
- (07:18) USC – Edwards 13 yard pass from Samuel, White kick (UGA 14–7)
- (00:30) UGA – Blankenship 45 yard field goal (UGA 17–7)

Second Quarter

- (05:57) USC – White 26 yard field goal (UGA 17–10)
- (00:00) UGA – Blankenship 44 yard field goal (UGA 20–10)

Third Quarter

- (12:55) UGA – Hardman 34 yard pass from Fromm, Blankenship kick (UGA 27–10)
- (09:12) UGA – Holyfield 5 yard run, Blankenship kick (UGA 34–10)
- (03:00) UGA – Herrien 15 yard run, Blankenship kick (UGA 41–10)

Fourth Quarter

- (09:59) USC – Edwards 44 yard pass from Bentley, White kick (UGA 41–17)

Total Yards

- UGA – 473; 202 passing yards, 271 rushing yards
- USC – 336; 282 passing yards, 54 rushing yards

Passing leader

- UGA – Jake Fromm; 15-18, 194 yards, 1 TD, 1 INT
- USC – Jake Bentley; 30-47, 269 yards, 1 TD, 2 INT

Rushing leader

- UGA – Elijah Holyfield; 9 rushes, 79 yards, 1 TD
- USC – Ty'Son Williams; 6 rushes, 26 yards, 0 TD

Receiving leader

- UGA – Mecole Hardman; 6 catches, 103 yards, 1 TD
- USC – Bryan Edwards; 7 catches, 111 yards, 2 TD

Defensive leader

- UGA – Richard LeCounte; 7 tackles
- USC – Steven Montac; 4 tackles

=== Middle Tennessee ===
| | 1 | 2 | 3 | 4 | Total |
|---|---|---|---|---|---|
| Blue Raiders | 0 | 7 | 0 | 0 | 7 |
| No. 3 Bulldogs | 14 | 28 | 7 | 0 | 49 |

=== At Missouri ===
| | 1 | 2 | 3 | 4 | Total |
|---|---|---|---|---|---|
| No. 2 Bulldogs | 7 | 13 | 13 | 10 | 43 |
| Tigers | 7 | 0 | 15 | 7 | 29 |

=== Tennessee ===
| Team | 1 | 2 | 3 | 4 | Total |
|---|---|---|---|---|---|
| Tennessee | 0 | 0 | 6 | 6 | 12 |
| • No. 2 Georgia | 7 | 10 | 7 | 14 | 38 |

- Location: Athens, Georgia
- Game start: 3:30 p.m.
- Elapsed time: 3:10
- Game attendance: 92,746
- Game weather: Temperature: 85 °F (29 °C) • Wind: 3 mph (4.8 km/h) • Weather: Partly cloudy
- Referee: John McDaid
- TV announcers (CBS): Brad Nessler (play-by-play), Gary Danielson (color), Jamie Erdahl (sidelines)

Scoring summary
| 1 | 8:52 | UGA | Isaac Nauta 31-yard run (Rodrigo Blankenship kick) | UGA 7–0 |
| 2 | 11:57 | UGA | Blankenship 43-yard field goal | UGA 10–0 |
| 2 | :30 | UGA | D'Andre Swift 1-yard run (Blankenship kick) | UGA 17–0 |
| 3 | 9:52 | UGA | Justin Fields 12-yard run (Blankenship kick) | UGA 24–0 |
| 3 | 5:14 | TENN | Josh Palmer 37-yard pass from Jarrett Guarantano (Conversion failed) | UGA 24–6 |
| 4 | 11:10 | TENN | Ty Chandler 35-yard pass from Guarantano (Conversion failed) | UGA 24–12 |
| 4 | 3:31 | UGA | Swift 14-yard run (Blankenship kick) | UGA 31–12 |
| 4 | 2:41 | UGA | Fields 15-yard run (Blankenship kick) | UGA 38–12 |

=== Vanderbilt ===
| | 1 | 2 | 3 | 4 | Total |
|---|---|---|---|---|---|
| Commodores | 3 | 3 | 0 | 7 | 13 |
| No. 2 Bulldogs | 7 | 14 | 17 | 3 | 41 |

=== At No. 13 LSU ===
Georgia Bulldogs offensive lineman Isaiah Wilson (79), LSU Tigers safety Grant Delpit (9), and LSU Tigers defensive end Rashard Lawrence (90) coming over the top on October 13, 2018

No. 2 Georgia at No. 13 LSU – Game summary

| Quarter | 1 | 2 | 3 | 4 | Total |
|---|---|---|---|---|---|
| No. 2 Bulldogs | 0 | 0 | 9 | 7 | 16 |
| No. 13 Tigers | 3 | 13 | 3 | 17 | 36 |

at Tiger Stadium, Baton Rouge, LA

- Date: October 13
- Game time: 2:30 p.m. CST
- Game weather: 86 °F (30 °C); sunny
- Game attendance: 102,321
- Referee: James Carter
- TV: CBS

Game information

First quarter

- LSU – Cole Tracy 33-yard field goal, 9:32 (LSU 3–0)

Second quarter

- LSU – Joe Burrow 1-yard TD run, Tracy kick good, 13:34 (LSU 10–0)
- LSU – Tracy 36-yard field goal, 11:22 (LSU 13–0)
- LSU – Tracy 39-yard field goal, 5:09 (LSU 16–0)

Third quarter

- UGA – Rodrigo Blankenship 40-yard field goal, 9:03 (LSU 16–3)
- LSU – Tracy 24-yard field goal, 3:00 (LSU 19–3)
- UGA – Elijah Holyfield 10-yard TD run, two-point conversion run attempt no good, 0:07 (LSU 19–9)

Fourth quarter

- LSU – Burrow 1-yard TD run, Tracy kick good, 9:31 (LSU 26–9)
- LSU – Tracy 30-yard field goal, 7:20 (LSU 29–9)
- UGA – Riley Ridley 27-yard TD pass from Jake Fromm, Blankenship kick good, 6:00 (LSU 29–16)
- LSU – Nick Brossette 4-yard TD run, Tracy kick good, 4:14 (LSU 36–16)

Top passers

- LSU – Joe Burrow – 15/30, 200 yards
- UGA – Jake Fromm – 16/34, 209 yards, TD, 2 INT

Top rushers

- LSU – Clyde Edwards-Helaire – 19 carries, 145 yards
- UGA – D'Andre Swift – 12 carries, 72 yards

Top receivers

- LSU – Justin Jefferson – 6 receptions, 108 yards
- UGA – Riley Ridley – 3 receptions, 75 yards, TD

=== No. 9 Florida ===
Florida Gators (6–1) vs. Georgia Bulldogs (6–1)

| Quarter | 1 | 2 | 3 | 4 | Total |
|---|---|---|---|---|---|
| No. 9 Gators | 0 | 7 | 7 | 3 | 17 |
| No. 7 Bulldogs | 10 | 3 | 10 | 13 | 36 |

at TIAA Bank Field • Jacksonville, Florida

- Date: October 27
- Game time: 3:30 p.m.
- Game weather: Mostly cloudy; 68 °F (20 °C); wind 13 mph (21 km/h) W
- Game attendance: 84,463
- Referee: Matt Loeffler
- TV announcers (CBS): Brad Nessler and Gary Danielson
- Game Book

Game information

Florida

- Feleipe Franks
  13/21, 105 Yds, TD, INT
- La'Mical Perine
  14 Rush, 62 Yds
- Freddie Swain
  2 Rec, 38 Yds, TD

Georgia

- Jake Fromm
  17/24, 240 Yds, 3 TD
- D'Andre Swift
  12 Rush, 104 Yds, TD
- Isaac Nauta
  5 Rec, 73 Yds

Scoring summary

| Quarter | Time | Drive | | | Team | Scoring information | Score | |
| Quarter | Time | Plays | Yards | TOP | Team | Scoring information | FLA | UGA |
|---|---|---|---|---|---|---|---|---|
| 1 | 8:11 | 12 | 71 | 6:49 | Georgia | 21-yard field goal by Blankenship | 0 | 3 |
| 1 | 6:07 | 3 | 13 | 1:17 | Georgia | Holloman 16-yard touchdown reception from Fromm, Blankenship kick good | 0 | 10 |
| 2 | 9:57 | 14 | 76 | 7:04 | Florida | Franks 1-yard touchdown run, McPherson kick good | 7 | 10 |
| 2 | 0:02 | 7 | 75 | 0:48 | Georgia | 22-yard field goal by Blankenship | 7 | 13 |
| 3 | 13:35 | 3 | 48 | 1:14 | Florida | Swain 36-yard touchdown reception from Franks, McPherson kick good | 14 | 13 |
| 3 | 10:33 | 7 | 72 | 2:55 | Georgia | Holloman 12-yard touchdown reception from Fromm, Blankenship kick good | 14 | 20 |
| 3 | 0:07 | 6 | 0 | 3:58 | Georgia | 18-yard field goal by Blankenship | 14 | 23 |
| 4 | 11:12 | 7 | 50 | 3:55 | Florida | 42-yard field goal by McPherson | 17 | 23 |
| 4 | 8:39 | 9 | 75 | 2:33 | Georgia | Goodwin 24-yard touchdown reception from Fromm, 2-point pass failed | 17 | 29 |
| 4 | 4:29 | 6 | 66 | 3:44 | Georgia | Swift 33-yard touchdown run, Blankenship kick good | 17 | 36 |
| "TOP" = time of possession. For other American football terms, see Glossary of American football. | | | | | | | 17 | 36 |

=== At Kentucky ===
No. 6 Georgia at No. 9 Kentucky – Game summary

| Quarter | 1 | 2 | 3 | 4 | Total |
|---|---|---|---|---|---|
| No. 6 Bulldogs | 7 | 7 | 14 | 6 | 34 |
| No. 9 Wildcats | 0 | 3 | 7 | 7 | 17 |

at Kroger Field, Lexington, Kentucky

- Date: November 3, 2018
- Game time: 3:30 p.m. EST
- TV announcers (CBS): Carter Blackburn (play-by-play), Rick Neuheisel (co-analyst), Aaron Taylor (co-analyst), John Schriffen (sideline reporter)

=== No. 24 Auburn ===
Auburn Tigers at No. 5 Georgia Bulldogs – Game summary

| Quarter | 1 | 2 | 3 | 4 | Total |
|---|---|---|---|---|---|
| No. 24 Tigers | 7 | 3 | 0 | 0 | 10 |
| No. 5 Bulldogs | 3 | 17 | 0 | 7 | 27 |

at Sanford Stadium • Athens, Georgia

- Date: November 10, 2018
- Game time: 7:10 p.m.
- Game weather: Temperature: 45° • Wind: Calm • Weather: Clear
- Game attendance: 92,746
- Referee: John McDaid
- TV announcers (ESPN): Sean McDonough (play-by-play), Todd Blackledge (analyst), Holly Rowe (sideline reporter)

Game information

First Quarter

- UGA – Rodrigo Blankenship 25 yd field goal, 7:01 (UGA 3–0)
- AUB – John Shenker 9 yd pass from JaTarvious Whitlow (Anders Carlson kick), 4:28 (AUB 7–3)

Second Quarter

- UGA – Rodrigo Blankenship 20 yd field goal, 11:13 (AUB 7–6)
- AUB – Anders Carlson 27 yd field goal, 7:46 (AUB 10–6)
- UGA – Tyler Simmons 14 yd pass from Jake Fromm (Rodrigo Blankenship kick), 2:47 (UGA 13–10)
- UGA – Terry Godwin 38 yd pass from Jake Fromm (Rodrigo Blankenship kick), 0:21 (UGA 20–10)

Fourth Quarter

- UGA – D'Andre Swift 77 yd run (Rodrigo Blankenship kick), 13:53 (UGA 27–10)

Top Passers

- AUB – Jarrett Stidham – 24–36, 163 yds
- UGA – Jake Fromm – 13–20, 193 yds, 2 TD, 1 INT

Top Rushers

- AUB – Shaun Shivers – 4 rushes, 43 yds
- UGA – D'Andre Swift – 17 rushes, 186 yds, 1 TD

Top Receivers

- AUB – Ryan Davis – 13 receptions, 72 yds
- UGA – Terry Godwin – 3 receptions, 84 yds, 1 TD

=== UMass ===
| | 1 | 2 | 3 | 4 | Total |
|---|---|---|---|---|---|
| Minutemen | 7 | 6 | 7 | 7 | 27 |
| No. 5 Bulldogs | 14 | 28 | 17 | 7 | 66 |

=== Georgia Tech ===
| | 1 | 2 | 3 | 4 | Total |
|---|---|---|---|---|---|
| Yellow Jackets | 7 | 0 | 0 | 14 | 21 |
| No. 5 Bulldogs | 14 | 24 | 7 | 0 | 45 |

=== vs. Alabama (SEC Championship) ===
SEC Championship Game

| Team | 1 | 2 | 3 | 4 | Total |
|---|---|---|---|---|---|
| • #1 Alabama | 0 | 14 | 7 | 14 | 35 |
| #4 Georgia | 7 | 14 | 7 | 0 | 28 |

- Date: December 1
- Location: Atlanta, GA
- Game start: 4:11 pm
- Game attendance: 77,141
- Game weather: Indoors
- Referee: Matt Loeffler
- TV announcers (CBS): Brad Nessler (play-by-play), Gary Danielson (color), Jamie Erdahl (sideline)

Scoring summary
| Q1 |
| Q2 |
| Q3 |
| Q4 |

Statistics

| Statistics | Alabama | Georgia |
|---|---|---|
| First downs | 21 | 23 |
| Total yards | 403 | 454 |
| Rushes–yards | 29–157 | 39–153 |
| Passing yards | 246 | 301 |
| Passing: Comp–Att–Int | 17–34–2 | 25–40–0 |
| Time of possession | 24:30 | 35:30 |

| Team | Category | Player | Statistics |
|---|---|---|---|
| Alabama | Passing | Tua Tagovailoa | 10–25, 164 yards, 1 TD, 2 INT's |
| Alabama | Rushing | Josh Jacobs | 8 carries, 83 yards, 2 TD's |
| Alabama | Receiving | Jaylen Waddle | 4 receptions, 113 yards, 1 TD |
| Georgia | Passing | Jake Fromm | 25–39, 301 yards, 3 TD's |
| Georgia | Rushing | D'Andre Swift | 16 carries, 75 yards, 1 TD |
| Georgia | Receiving | Isaac Nauta | 4 receptions, 81 yards, 1 TD |

=== vs Texas (2019 Sugar Bowl) ===
| | 1 | 2 | 3 | 4 | Total |
|---|---|---|---|---|---|
| Longhorns | 10 | 10 | 0 | 8 | 28 |
| Bulldogs | 0 | 7 | 0 | 14 | 21 |

== Players drafted into the NFL ==
| Round | Pick | Player | Position | NFL Club |
|---|---|---|---|---|
| 1 | 30 | Deandre Baker | CB | New York Giants |
| 2 | 56 | Mecole Hardman | WR | Kansas City Chiefs |
| 4 | 126 | Riley Ridley | WR | Chicago Bears |
| 5 | 168 | D'Andre Walker | LB | Tennessee Titans |
| 6 | 179 | Lamont Gaillard | C | Arizona Cardinals |
| 7 | 224 | Isaac Nauta | TE | Detroit Lions |
| 7 | 237 | Terry Godwin | WR | Carolina Panthers |

== Rankings ==
Ranking movements Legend: ██ Increase in ranking ██ Decrease in ranking т = Tied with team above or below
| | Week | | | | | | | | | | | | | | | |
| Poll | Pre | 1 | 2 | 3 | 4 | 5 | 6 | 7 | 8 | 9 | 10 | 11 | 12 | 13 | 14 | Final |
|---|---|---|---|---|---|---|---|---|---|---|---|---|---|---|---|---|
| AP | 3 | 3 | 3 | 2 | 2 | 2 | 2 | 8 | 7 | 6 | 5 | 5 | 5 | 4 | 6 | 7–T |
| Coaches | 4 | 3 | 3 | 3 | 3 | 2 | 2 | 6 | 6 | 5–T | 5 | 5 | 5 | 4 | 6 | 8 |
| CFP | Not released | | | | | | | | | 6 | 5 | 5 | 5 | 4 | 5 | Not released |
