= 2018 SEC Championship Game =

- Conference Championship
Alabama Crimson Tide	Georgia Bulldogs
(12–0)	(11–1)
35	28
Head coach: Nick Saban	Head coach: Kirby Smart
AP / Coaches / CFP; 1 / 1 / 1	AP / Coaches / CFP; 4 / 4 / 4
	1	2	3	4	Total
Alabama	0	14	7	14	35
Georgia	7	14	7	0	28
- Date: December 1, 2018
- Season: 2018
- Stadium: Mercedes-Benz Stadium
- Location: Atlanta, Georgia
- MVP: Josh Jacobs, RB, Alabama
- Favorite: Alabama by 14
- Referee: Matt Loeffler
- Attendance: 77,141

United States TV coverage
- Network: CBS, Westwood One, SEC Radio
- Announcers: Brad Nessler, Gary Danielson, and Jamie Erdahl (CBS); Ryan Radtke, Derek Rackley and Ross Tucker (Westwood One); Dave Neal, David Archer and Stephen Hartzell (SEC Radio)

2018 Southeastern Conference football standings
	Conf.			Overall
Team	W		L	W		L
Eastern Division
No. T–7 Georgia x	7	–	1	11	–	3
No. 12 Kentucky	5	–	3	10	–	3
No. T–7 Florida	5	–	3	10	–	3
South Carolina	4	–	4	7	–	6
Missouri	4	–	4	8	–	5
Vanderbilt	3	–	5	6	–	7
Tennessee	2	–	6	5	–	7
Western Division
No. 2 Alabama x$^	8	–	0	14	–	1
No. 16 Texas A&M	5	–	3	9	–	4
No. 6 LSU	5	–	3	10	–	3
Mississippi State*	4	–	4	8	–	5
Auburn	3	–	5	8	–	5
Ole Miss	1	–	7	5	–	7
Arkansas	0	–	8	2	–	10
Championship: Alabama 35, Georgia 28
^ – College Football Playoff participant; $ – Conference champion; x – Division champion/co-champions; * Mississippi State vacated four conference and eight total wins due to NCAA violations.; Rankings from AP Poll

The 2018 SEC Championship Game was played on Saturday, December 1, 2018, in the Mercedes-Benz Stadium in Atlanta, to determine the 2018 football champion of the Southeastern Conference (SEC). The game featured the East Division champion Georgia against the West Division champion Alabama. Georgia, the East Division Champion, was the designated home team. The game was televised by CBS for the eighteenth straight year. Alabama came back from a 28–14 deficit in the third quarter to defeat Georgia, 35–28.

== 2017 season ==
In the 2017 SEC Championship Game, the East champion Georgia defeated the West champion Auburn 28–7 in a rematch from three weeks prior where Auburn defeated Georgia 40–17. It was the first time since 2008 an East Division team won the SEC Championship.

== Teams ==
=== Alabama ===
Also on November 3, Alabama secured its spot in the title game by defeating LSU by a score of 29–0. This gave Alabama a two-game lead over LSU in the West Division, with the Crimson Tide holding the potential tiebreaker. LSU then lost 74-72 to Texas A&M in the final game of the regular season, thus meaning Alabama had won every possible tiebreaker.

=== Georgia ===
Georgia won its November 3 game against Kentucky, securing the East Division. While Georgia could have finished in a tie for the division title with any combination of Kentucky and Florida, Georgia also defeated Florida during the season, giving the Bulldogs all possible divisional tiebreakers. The Bulldogs ultimately won the East title by two games.

=== Alabama vs. Georgia series history ===
This match up was the 69th all time meeting against the Crimson Tide and Bulldogs. They last played each other last season for the College Football Playoff National Championship . Alabama defeated Georgia, in overtime, 26–23. After the January 8, 2018 match up, Alabama leads the all time series 39–25–4. This match up was the first time since 2012, that the two teams face off in the conference title game.

== Game summary ==
=== Scoring summary ===
Scoring summary

Quarter	Time	Drive			Team	Scoring information	Score	
Quarter	Time	Plays	Yards	TOP	Team	Scoring information	BAMA	UGA
1	3:08	7	60	3:08	UGA	Isaac Nauta 20-yard touchdown reception from Jake Fromm, Rodrigo Blankenship kick good	0	7
2	14:56	8	75	3:12	BAMA	Josh Jacobs 1-yard touchdown run, Joseph Bulovas kick good	7	7
2	7:31	13	74	7:25	UGA	D'Andre Swift 9-yard touchdown run, Rodrigo Blankenship kick good	7	14
2	4:05	6	51	2:22	UGA	D'Andre Swift 11-yard touchdown reception from Jake Fromm, Rodrigo Blankenship kick good	7	21
2	2:18	4	75	1:47	BAMA	Josh Jacobs 0-yard fumble recovery	14	21
3	12:39	3	51	1:14	UGA	Riley Ridley 23-yard touchdown reception from Jake Fromm, Rodrigo Blankenship kick good	14	28
3	3:02	4	72	1:29	BAMA	Jaylen Waddle 51-yard touchdown reception from Tua Tagovailoa, Joseph Bulovas kick good	21	28
4	5:19	16	80	7:08	BAMA	Jerry Jeudy 10-yard touchdown reception from Jalen Hurts, Joseph Bulovas kick good	28	28
4	1:04	5	52	2:00	BAMA	Jalen Hurts 15-yard touchdown run, Joseph Bulovas kick good	35	28
"TOP" = time of possession. For other American football terms, see Glossary of American football.							35	28

=== Statistics ===
	1	2	3	4	Total
No. 1 Crimson Tide	0	14	7	14	35
No. 4 Bulldogs	7	14	7	0	28

Statistics	Alabama	Georgia
First downs	21	23
Total yards	403	454
Rushes–yards	29–157	39–153
Passing yards	246	301
Passing: Comp–Att–Int	17–34–2	25–40–0
Time of possession	24:30	35:30

Team	Category	Player	Statistics
Alabama	Passing	Tua Tagovailoa	10–25, 164 yards, 1 TD, 2 INTs
Alabama	Rushing	Josh Jacobs	8 carries, 83 yards, 2 TDs
Alabama	Receiving	Jaylen Waddle	4 receptions, 113 yards, 1 TD
Georgia	Passing	Jake Fromm	25–39, 301 yards, 3 TDs
Georgia	Rushing	D'Andre Swift	16 carries, 75 yards, 1 TD
Georgia	Receiving	Isaac Nauta	4 receptions, 81 yards, 1 TD

Note: 77,141 was the officially announced attendance figure; "turnstile count" subsequently reported as 69,614.
