= Jim Thorpe Award =

College football award

- Awarded for: The top defensive back in college football
- Country: United States
- Presented by: Oklahoma Sports Hall of Fame

History
- First award: 1986
- Most recent: Ohio State safety Caleb Downs
- Website: http://www.oksportshof.org

The Jim Thorpe Award, named in memory of multi-sport athlete Jim Thorpe, has been awarded to the top defensive back in college football since 1986. It is voted on by the Oklahoma Sports Hall of Fame. In 2017, the award became sponsored by Paycom and was named the Paycom Jim Thorpe Award.

== Winners ==
| Season | Player | Position | School | Ref |
|---|---|---|---|---|
| 1986 | Thomas Everett | S | Baylor | |
| 1987 (tie) | Bennie Blades | S | Miami (FL) | |
| 1987 (tie) | Rickey Dixon | S | Oklahoma | |
| 1988 | Deion Sanders | CB | Florida State | |
| 1989 | Mark Carrier | S | USC | |
| 1990 | Darryll Lewis | CB | Arizona | |
| 1991 | Terrell Buckley | CB | Florida State (2) | |
| 1992 | Deon Figures | CB | Colorado | |
| 1993 | Antonio Langham | CB | Alabama | |
| 1994 | Chris Hudson | DB | Colorado (2) | |
| 1995 | Greg Myers | S | Colorado State | |
| 1996 (Note: In 1996, finalist Kansas State cornerback Chris Canty withdrew his name from consideration, which caused a re-vote.) | Lawrence Wright | FS | Florida | |
| 1997 | Charles Woodson | CB | Michigan | |
| 1998 | Antoine Winfield Sr. | CB | Ohio State | |
| 1999 | Tyrone Carter | S | Minnesota | |
| 2000 | Jamar Fletcher | CB | Wisconsin | |
| 2001 | Roy Williams | SS | Oklahoma (2) | |
| 2002 | Terence Newman | CB | Kansas State | |
| 2003 | Derrick Strait | CB | Oklahoma (3) | |
| 2004 | Carlos Rogers | CB | Auburn | |
| 2005 | Michael Huff | SS | Texas | |
| 2006 | Aaron Ross | CB | Texas (2) | |
| 2007 | Antoine Cason | CB | Arizona (2) | |
| 2008 | Malcolm Jenkins | CB | Ohio State (2) | |
| 2009 | Eric Berry | SS | Tennessee | |
| 2010 | Patrick Peterson | CB | LSU | |
| 2011 | Morris Claiborne | CB | LSU (2) | |
| 2012 | Johnthan Banks | CB | Mississippi State | |
| 2013 | Darqueze Dennard | CB | Michigan State | |
| 2014 | Gerod Holliman | S | Louisville | |
| 2015 | Desmond King | CB | Iowa | |
| 2016 | Adoree' Jackson | CB | USC (2) | |
| 2017 | Minkah Fitzpatrick | S | Alabama (2) | |
| 2018 | Deandre Baker | CB | Georgia | |
| 2019 | Grant Delpit | S | LSU (3) | |
| 2020 | Tre'von Moehrig | FS | TCU | |
| 2021 | Coby Bryant | CB | Cincinnati | |
| 2022 | Tre Tomlinson | CB | TCU (2) | |
| 2023 | Trey Taylor | FS | Air Force | |
| 2024 | Jahdae Barron | CB | Texas (3) | |
| 2025 | Caleb Downs | S | Ohio State (3) | |

- Note:
