= Deandre Baker =

American football player (born 1997)

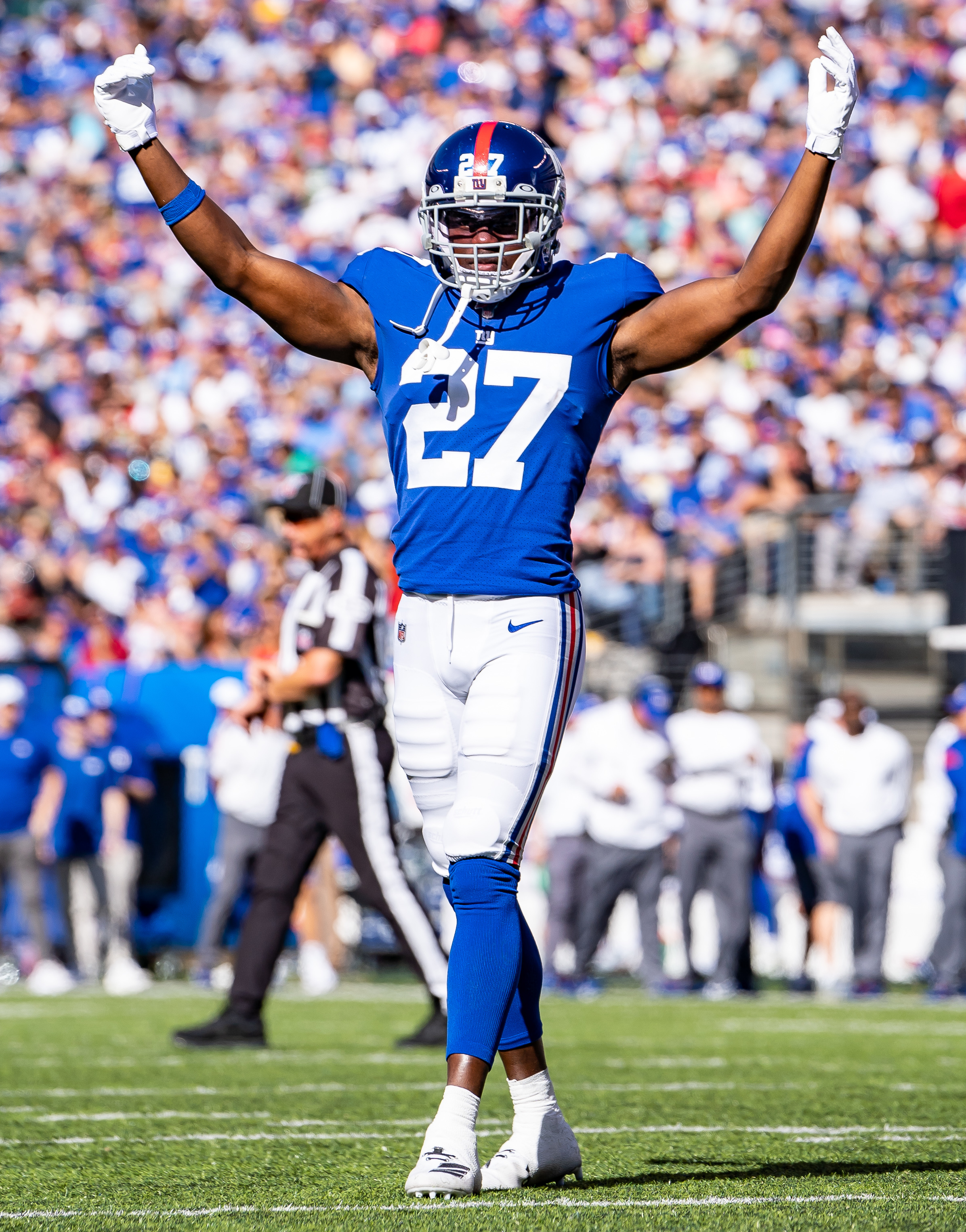
- Baker with the New York Giants in 2019

No. 2 – DC Defenders
- Position: Cornerback
- Roster status: Active

Personal information
- Born: September 4, 1997 (age 29); Miami, Florida, U.S.
- Listed height: 5 ft 11 in (1.80 m)
- Listed weight: 181 lb (82 kg)

Career information
- High school: Miami Northwestern
- College: Georgia (2015–2018)
- NFL draft: 2019: 1st round, 30th overall pick

Career history
- New York Giants (2019); Kansas City Chiefs (2020–2021); DC Defenders (2024–present)

Awards and highlights
- UFL champion (2025); 2× All-UFL Team (2024, 2025); Jim Thorpe Award (2018); Consensus All-American (2018)

Career NFL statistics
- Total tackles: 82
- Sacks: 1.0
- Pass deflections: 10
- Stats at Pro Football Reference

Deandre Lamar Baker (born September 4, 1997) is an American professional football cornerback for the DC Defenders of the United Football League (UFL). He played college football at Georgia and was selected by the New York Giants in the first round of the 2019 NFL draft. Baker played one season with the Giants before being released by them due to charges of armed robbery, which were later dropped. He has also been a member of the Kansas City Chiefs.

== Early life ==
During his time at Miami Northwestern Senior High School, Baker was an All-American sprinter and participated in the 4 × 100 metres relay on the second leg.

== College career ==
Baker signed with Georgia on National Signing Day, despite speculation that he would sign with Texas based on a tweet he sent out the night before. As a true freshman at Georgia in 2015, Baker played in 11 games. During the 2016 season, Baker was injured in a game against Vanderbilt. He recovered, but was later injured against Georgia Tech. Following the 2017 season, Baker was named to the Second-team All-Southeastern Conference. Baker considered declaring for the 2018 NFL draft, but he ultimately elected to return to school for his senior year.

Baker was one of the best cornerbacks in college football in his senior season. He allowed only 175 yards and a 40.2 NFL passer rating to opposing receivers in 2018, which both ranked in the top 5 of all draft eligible cornerbacks with a minimum of 300 coverage snaps. He was named a consensus 2018 All-American and won the Jim Thorpe Award, awarded to the best defensive back in college football. Over his entire 4-year tenure at Georgia, Baker only allowed one touchdown. Baker entered the 2019 NFL draft as one of the best cornerback prospects.

== Professional career ==
Pre-draft measurables
Height	Weight	Arm length	Hand span	Wingspan	40-yard dash	10-yard split	20-yard split	20-yard shuttle	Three-cone drill	Vertical jump	Broad jump	Bench press
5 ft 11 in (1.80 m)	193 lb (88 kg)	32 in (0.81 m)	9 in (0.23 m)	6 ft 5 1/8 in (1.96 m)	4.51 s	1.60 s	2.63 s	4.27 s	6.95 s	31.5 in (0.80 m)	9 ft 10 in (3.00 m)	14 reps
All values from NFL Combine/Pro Day

=== New York Giants ===
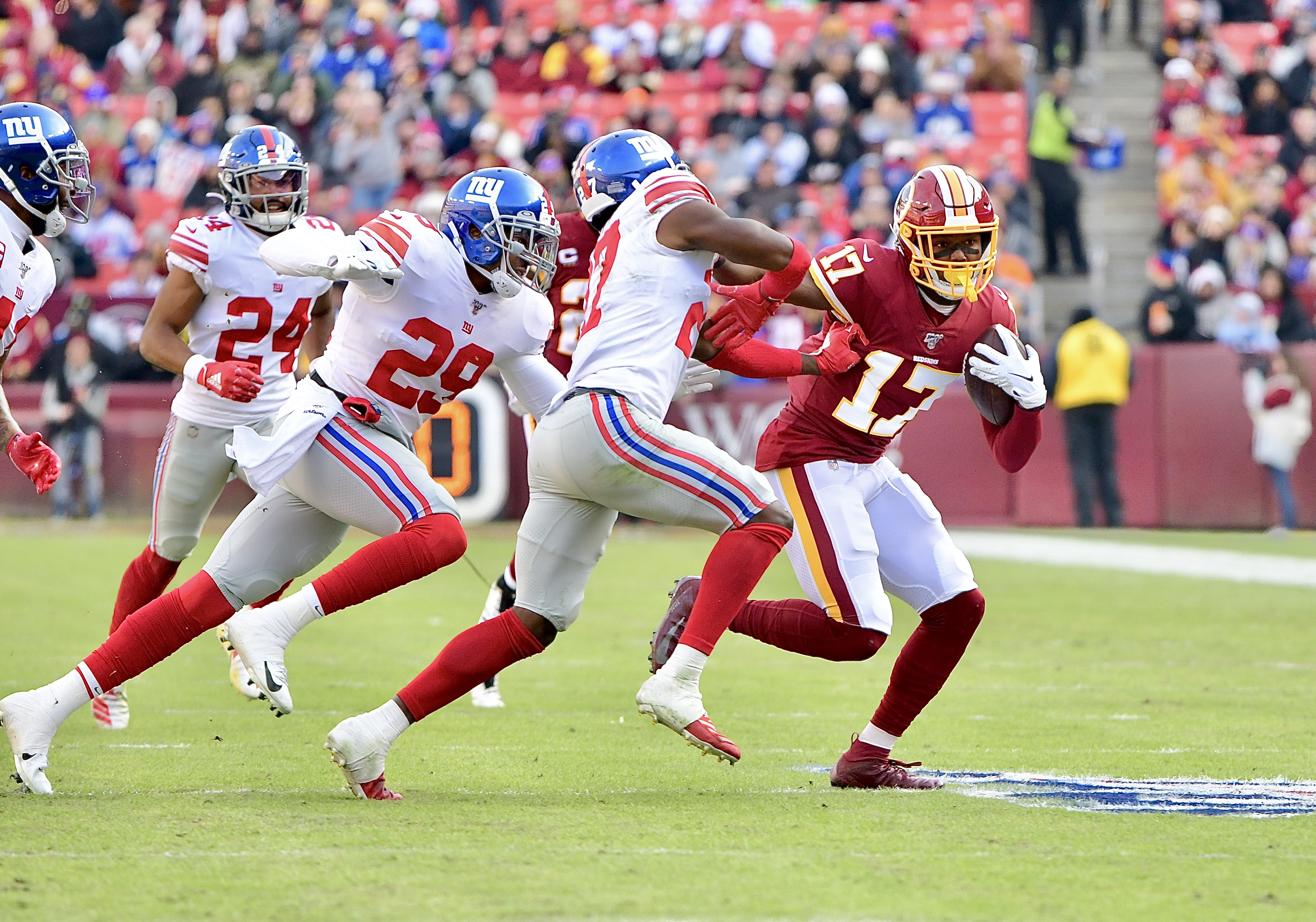
Baker (center) in a 2019 game against the Washington Redskins

Baker was selected by the New York Giants in the first round, 30th overall, of the 2019 NFL draft. The Giants had traded up with the Seattle Seahawks to acquire the pick giving up their 37th, 132nd and 142nd picks.

Baker was placed on the commissioner's exempt list on July 27, 2020, following his May 2020 arrest. The Giants waived Baker on September 8, 2020.

=== Kansas City Chiefs ===
On November 19, 2020, Baker was signed to the practice squad of the Kansas City Chiefs. He was elevated to the active roster on December 19, December 26, and January 2, 2021, for the team's weeks 15, 16, and 17 games against the New Orleans Saints, Atlanta Falcons, and Los Angeles Chargers, and reverted to the practice squad after each game. Against the Chargers, Baker broke his femur on a non-contact play, becoming only the second NFL player to suffer a broken femur during a game. During the game, Baker recorded his first career sack on Justin Herbert. He was placed on the practice squad/injured list on January 12, 2021.

On February 9, 2021, Baker re-signed with the Chiefs. He was waived on August 7, 2022.

=== DC Defenders ===
On January 25, 2024, Baker signed with the DC Defenders of the United Football League (UFL). He was named to the 2024 All-UFL team on June 5, 2024. On June 2, 2025, Baker was named to the 2025 All-UFL Team.

== Career statistics ==
=== NFL ===
Year	Team	Games		Tackles				Fumbles			Interceptions					
Year	Team	GP	GS	Comb	Solo	Ast	Sack	FF	FR	Yds	Int	Yds	Avg	Lng	TD	PD
2019	NYG	16	15	61	48	13	0.0	0	0	0	0	0	0.0	0	0	8
2020	KC	2	1	5	4	1	1.0	0	0	0	0	0	0.0	0	0	1
2021	KC	8	1	16	13	3	0	0	0	0	0	0	0.0	0	0	1
Career		26	17	82	65	17	1.0	0	0	0	0	0	0.0	0	0	10

=== College ===
Year	GP	Tackles					Interceptions					Fumbles			
Year	GP	Solo	Ast	Total	Loss	Sack	Int	Yards	Avg	TD	PD	FR	Yards	TD	FF
2015	1	1	0	1	0	0	0	0	0	0	0	0	0	0	0
2016	8	21	10	31	1	1	2	27	13.5	0	5	1	0	0	1
2017	15	30	14	44	1	0	3	37	12.3	0	9	0	0	0	0
2018	12	31	9	40	2	0	2	81	40.5	0	9	0	0	0	1

== Personal life ==
On May 14, 2020, a warrant was issued for Baker's arrest under charges of armed robbery and aggravated assault with a firearm, along with Quinton Dunbar of the Seattle Seahawks. The following day, Baker's lawyer issued a statement claiming that he was in possession of multiple affidavits allegedly exonerating his client. The two allegedly robbed guests at gunpoint during a house party and had turned themselves in to the police by May 16. On August 7, 2020, Baker was charged with four counts of robbery with a firearm. There was evidence suggesting the alleged victims accepted $55,000 in exchange for changing their story in regards to Dunbar. On November 16, 2020, the charges against Baker were dropped.
