= D'Andre Swift =

American football player (born 1999)

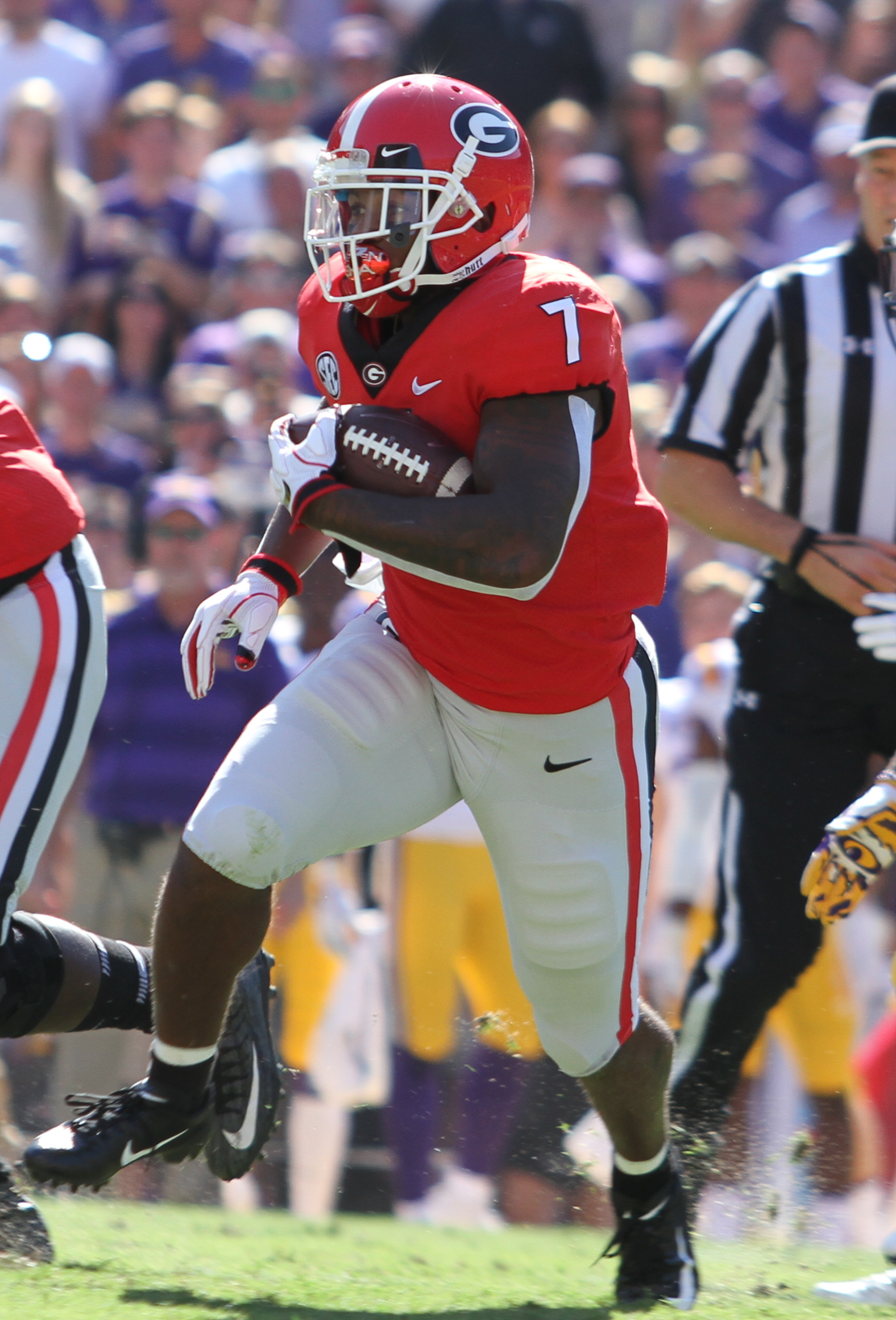
- Swift with the Georgia Bulldogs in 2018

No. 4 – Chicago Bears
- Position: Running back
- Roster status: Active

Personal information
- Born: January 14, 1999 (age 27); Philadelphia, Pennsylvania, U.S.
- Listed height: 5 ft 8 in (1.73 m)
- Listed weight: 204 lb (93 kg)

Career information
- High school: Saint Joseph's Prep (Philadelphia)
- College: Georgia (2017–2019)
- NFL draft: 2020: 2nd round, 35th overall pick

Career history
- Detroit Lions (2020–2022); Philadelphia Eagles (2023); Chicago Bears (2024–present)

Awards and highlights
- Pro Bowl (2023); First-team All-SEC (2019); Second-team All-SEC (2018)

Career NFL statistics as of Week 9, 2026
- Rushing yards: 5,351
- Rushing average: 4.4
- Rushing touchdowns: 48
- Receptions: 295
- Receiving yards: 2,259
- Receiving touchdowns: 9
- Stats at Pro Football Reference

D'Andre Tiyon Swift (born January 14, 1999) is an American professional football running back for the Chicago Bears of the National Football League (NFL). He played college football for the Georgia Bulldogs and was selected by the Detroit Lions in the second round of the 2020 NFL draft. In 2023, he was traded to the Philadelphia Eagles, where he earned his first Pro Bowl selection, before signing with the Bears in 2024.

== Early life ==
Swift attended St. Joseph's Preparatory School in Philadelphia, Pennsylvania. As a senior, he played high school football and rushed for 1,564 yards on 149 carries with 25 touchdowns. He committed to the University of Georgia to play college football.

== College career ==
=== 2017: Freshman year ===
As a freshman at Georgia in 2017, Swift was the third running back behind future NFL starters Nick Chubb and Sony Michel. On 73 carries, he rushed for 597 yards with three touchdowns.

=== 2018: Sophomore year ===
In his sophomore year, Swift split carries fairly evenly with junior Elijah Holyfield, though he was used more often as a receiver. He had three consecutive games with over 100 yards rushing in games against Florida, Kentucky, and Auburn that season. In the SEC Championship against Alabama, he had 16 carries for 75 rushing yards and a rushing touchdown to go along with six receptions for 63 receiving yards and a receiving touchdown in the 35–28 loss.

=== 2019: Junior year ===
As a junior, Swift recorded five games with over 100 rushing yards and had a stretch of four consecutive games with a rushing touchdown. He totaled 196 carries for 1,218 rushing yards and seven rushing touchdowns to go along with 24 receptions for 216 receiving yards and one receiving touchdown in 14 games.

== Professional career ==
=== Pre-draft ===
Pre-draft measurables
Height	Weight	Arm length	Hand span	Wingspan	40-yard dash	10-yard split	20-yard split	Vertical jump	Broad jump
5 ft 8 1/4 in (1.73 m)	212 lb (96 kg)	29 7/8 in (0.76 m)	9 in (0.23 m)	6 ft 0 in (1.83 m)	4.48 s	1.56 s	2.64 s	35.5 in (0.90 m)	10 ft 1 in (3.07 m)
All values from NFL Combine

=== Detroit Lions ===
==== 2020 ====
Swift was selected by the Detroit Lions with the 35th overall pick in the second round of the 2020 NFL draft. On July 13, 2020, the Lions signed Swift to a four-year contract, worth $8.5 million. In his rookie season, Swift shared the backfield with Adrian Peterson and Kerryon Johnson. In Swift's professional debut on September 13, 2020, he recorded his first career rushing touchdown, but later dropped what would have been a game-winning touchdown pass in the final seconds against the Chicago Bears. On October 18, in Week 6, Swift rushed for 116 yards and two touchdowns against the Jacksonville Jaguars, becoming the first Lions rookie running back to rush for 100-plus yards and score two touchdowns in a game since Barry Sanders in 1989. In Week 10, against the Washington Football Team, he had 149 scrimmage yards and a receiving touchdown in the 30–27 victory. Overall, Swift finished the 2020 season with 114 carries for 521 rushing yards and eight rushing touchdowns to go along with 46 receptions for 357 receiving yards and two receiving touchdowns in 13 games.

==== 2021 ====
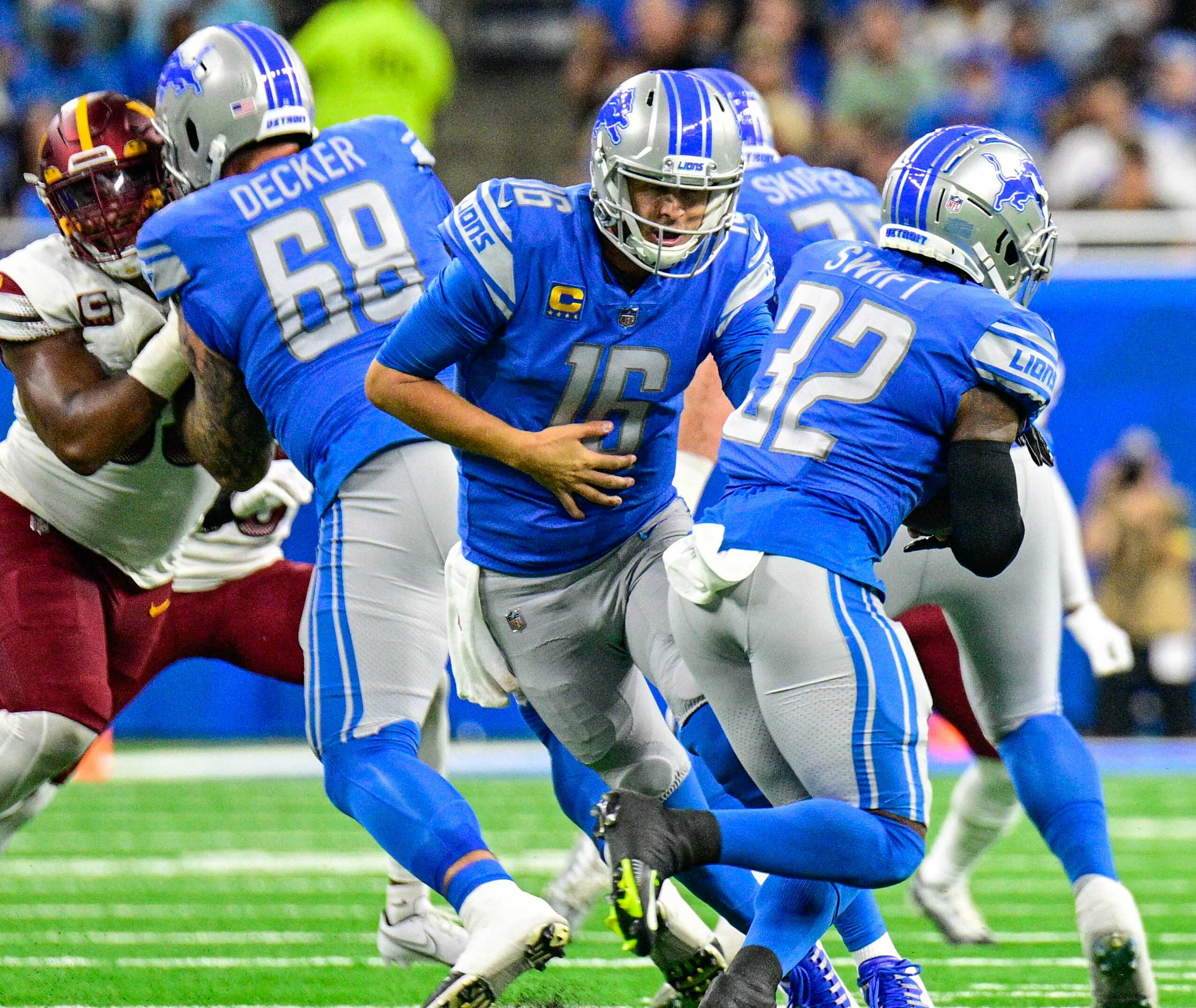
Swift (#32) playing for the Detroit Lions in 2022.

Swift was joined by Jamaal Williams in the Lions' backfield for the 2021 season. Over the season's first eight games, Swift totaled over 100 yards from scrimmage in four of them. In Weeks 10 and 11, Swift recorded 130 and 136 rushing yards against the Pittsburgh Steelers and Cleveland Browns. In the 2021 season, Swift appeared in 13 games. He finished with 151 carries for 617 rushing yards and four rushing touchdowns to go along with 62 receptions for 452 receiving yards and two receiving touchdowns.

==== 2022 ====
Swift started the 2022 season with 15 carries for 144 rushing yards and one rushing touchdown in a 38–35 loss to the Philadelphia Eagles. In Week 17 against the Bears, he had 117 scrimmage yards, one rushing touchdown, and one receiving touchdown in the 41–10 victory. Overall, in the 2022 season, Swift finished with 99 carries for 542 rushing yards and five rushing touchdowns to go along with 48 receptions for 389 receiving yards and three receiving touchdowns.

=== Philadelphia Eagles ===
On April 29, 2023, the Eagles traded a 2025 fourth-round pick for Swift and a swap of 2023 seventh-round picks during the 2023 NFL draft. In Week 2, Swift ran for a career-high 175 yards on 28 carries and a touchdown in a 34–28 win over the Minnesota Vikings, earning NFC Offensive Player of the Week. The following week, in a 25–11 win over Tampa Bay, Swift racked up another 130 rushing yards on 16 carries. In Week 17, Swift recorded 61 rushing yards, giving him 1,000 rushing yards in a season for the first time in his career. On January 3, 2024, Swift was selected to the 2024 Pro Bowl Games, the first Pro Bowl of his career.

=== Chicago Bears ===
==== 2024 ====
On March 13, 2024, Swift signed a three-year, $24 million contract with the Chicago Bears.

After averaging an inefficient 1.8 yards per carry through his first three games, Swift rebounded in Week 4 against the Los Angeles Rams, totaling 16 carries for 93 yards and a touchdown while catching all seven targets for 72 yards as the Bears won 24–18. He finished the 2024 season with 253 carries for 959 rushing yards and six rushing touchdowns to go with 42 receptions for 386 receiving yards.

==== 2025 ====
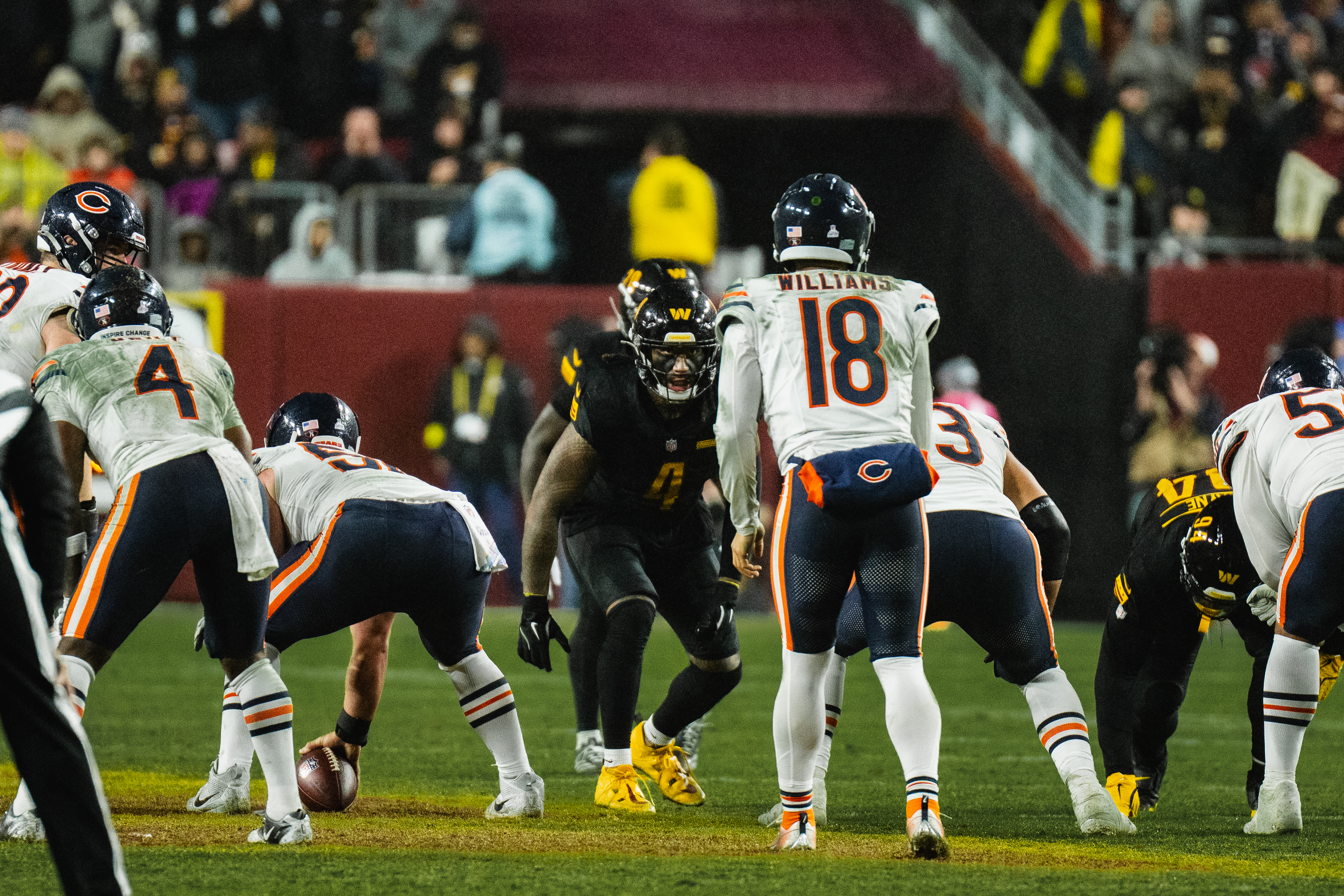
Swift (#4) playing for the Chicago Bears in 2025.

Like in 2024, Swift struggled to begin the 2025 season. He had just 187 yards and two touchdowns on 56 carries across the first four games, the 3.3 yards per carry lower than his rookie teammate Kyle Monangai's 3.6. Following the bye week, his performance improved as he ran for 108 yards against the Washington Commanders and 124 versus the New Orleans Saints, catching a touchdown in the former and running for another in the latter. It was the third time in Swift's career that he rushed for over 100 yards in consecutive games. He also had a score in the Bears' loss to the Baltimore Ravens.

Swift hurt his groin in the Commanders game, but continued to play until the injury forced him to miss Week 9 against the Cincinnati Bengals. Upon his return, Swift and Monangai began to share carries. In a Week 13 win over the Eagles, they became the first running back teammates to each record at least 100 rushing yards in a game since Ezekiel Elliott and Tony Pollard for the Dallas Cowboys in 2019 and the first such Bears duo since Walter Payton and Matt Suhey in 1985; Swift contributed 125 yards and a touchdown as they combined for 255.

He concluded the regular season with 1,087 rushing yards, the 12th most among running backs, and a career-high nine rushing touchdowns. In the wild card game against the Green Bay Packers, Swift scored the Bears' first touchdown in the fourth quarter while they trailed 21–3, sparking a comeback that culminated in a 31–27 victory.

==== 2026 ====
On September 11, 2026, Swift signed a three-year, $33.75 million extension with the Bears that included $27.5 million in guaranteed money.

In the season-opening victory against the Carolina Panthers, Swift ran for 124 yards and three touchdowns as part of a Bears rushing attack that recorded 291 yards (the team's most on the ground since 1984) and six touchdowns (their most since 1941). His 124 yards were also the most by a Bears running back in a season opener since Matt Forte's 141 in 2015. The performance earned him NFC Offensive Player of the Week, becoming the first Bears running back to receive the honor since Jordan Howard in 2018.

During the Bears' Week 8 win over the Seattle Seahawks on Monday Night Football, Swift recorded three rushing touchdowns in the second half, tying Payton for the franchise record of the most rushing touchdowns in a half. It was also his second game of 2026 with three rushing scores, tied for the team record with Payton in 1979 and Dutch Sternaman in 1920.

== Career statistics ==
=== NFL ===
Legend
**Bold**	Career high

==== Regular season ====
Year	Team	Games		Rushing					Receiving					Fumbles	
Year	Team	GP	GS	Att	Yds	Avg	Lng	TD	Rec	Yds	Avg	Lng	TD	Fum	Lost
2020	DET	13	4	114	521	4.6	54	8	46	357	7.8	26	2	**3**	**2**
2021	DET	13	4	151	617	4.1	**57**	5	**62**	**452**	7.3	**63**	2	2	1
2022	DET	14	8	99	542	**5.5**	50	5	48	389	8.1	25	**3**	1	0
2023	PHI	16	15	229	1,049	4.6	43	5	39	214	5.5	20	1	**3**	1
2024	CHI	17	17	**253**	959	3.8	56	6	42	386	**9.2**	42	0	2	0
2025	CHI	16	16	223	**1,087**	4.9	25	9	34	299	8.8	55	1	2	**2**
2026	CHI	9	9	155	576	3.7	32	**10**	24	162	6.9	32	0	2	0
Career		98	73	1,224	5,351	4.4	57	48	295	2,259	7.7	63	9	15	6

==== Postseason ====
Year	Team	Games		Rushing					Receiving					Fumbles	
Year	Team	GP	GS	Att	Yds	Avg	Lng	TD	Rec	Yds	Avg	Lng	TD	Fum	Lost
2023	PHI	1	1	10	34	3.4	**17**	0	**4**	32	8.0	11	0	0	0
2025	CHI	2	2	**32**	**130**	**4.1**	13	**1**	2	**38**	**19.0**	**23**	0	0	0
Career		3	3	42	164	3.9	17	1	6	70	11.7	23	0	0	0

=== College ===
Season	Team	GP	Rushing				Receiving			
Season	Team	GP	Att	Yds	Avg	TD	Rec	Yds	Avg	TD
2017	Georgia	**15**	81	618	**7.6**	3	17	153	9.0	1
2018	Georgia	14	163	1,049	6.4	**10**	**32**	**297**	**9.3**	**3**
2019	Georgia	14	**196**	**1,218**	6.2	7	24	216	9.0	1
Career		43	440	2,885	6.6	20	73	666	9.1	5
