= Rodrigo Blankenship =

American football player (born 1997)

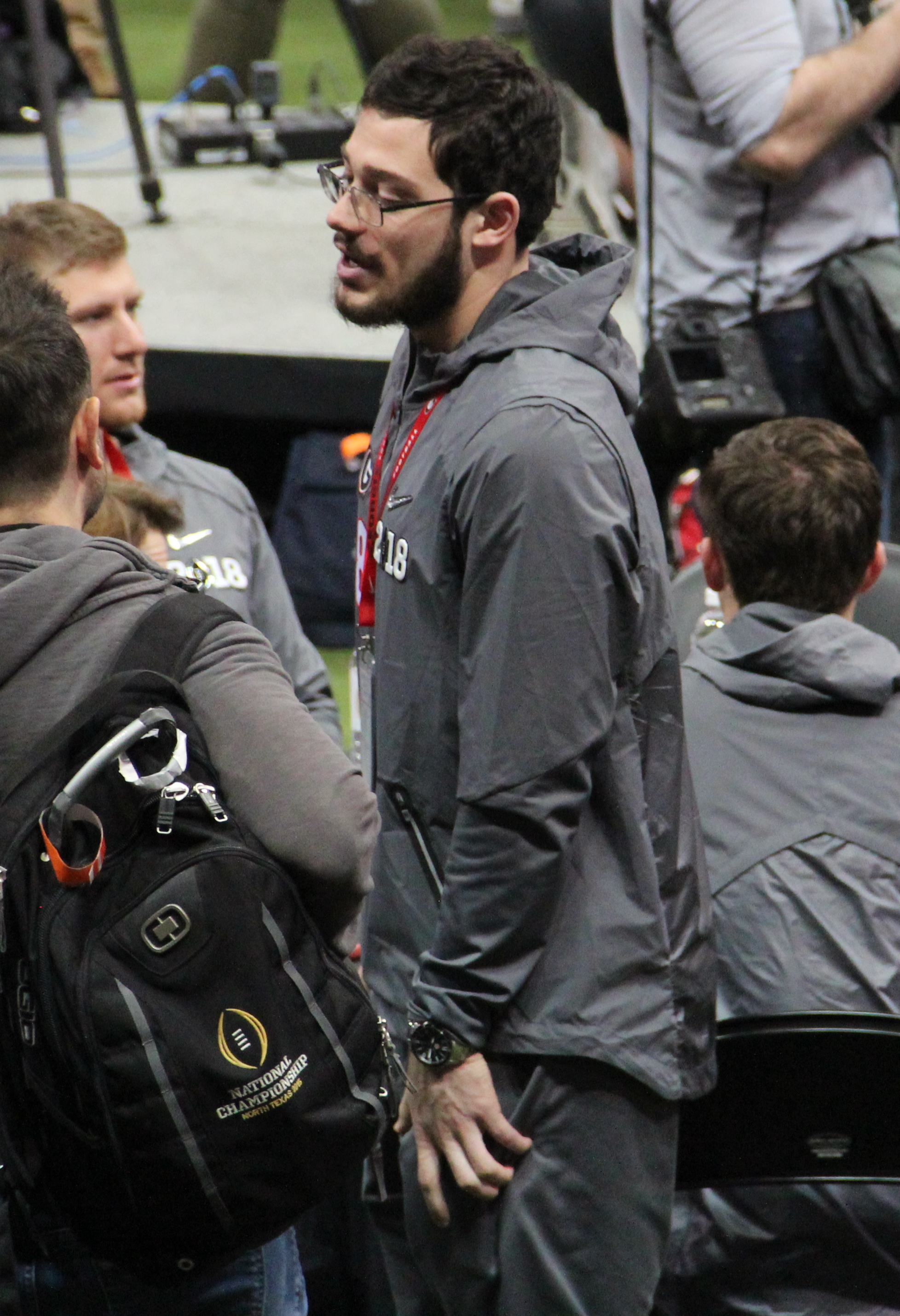
- Blankenship in 2018

Profile
- Position: Placekicker

Personal information
- Born: January 29, 1997 (age 29); Marietta, Georgia, U.S.
- Listed height: 6 ft 1 in (1.85 m)
- Listed weight: 184 lb (83 kg)

Career information
- High school: Sprayberry (Marietta)
- College: Georgia (2015–2019)
- NFL draft: 2020: undrafted

Career history
- Indianapolis Colts (2020–2022); Arizona Cardinals (2022); Tampa Bay Buccaneers (2023)*; St. Louis Battlehawks (2025); Birmingham Stallions (2026)
- * Offseason or practice squad member only

Awards and highlights
- PFWA All-Rookie Team (2020); All-UFL Team (2025); Lou Groza Award (2019); First-team All-SEC (2019); Second-team All-SEC (2018)

Career NFL statistics
- Field goals made: 47
- Field goal attempts: 56
- Field goal %: 83.9
- Points scored: 195
- Longest field goal: 53
- Touchbacks: 32
- Stats at Pro Football Reference

Rodrigo John Blankenship (born January 29, 1997), nicknamed "Hot Rod", is an American professional football placekicker. He played college football for the Georgia Bulldogs, where he kicked the longest field goal in Rose Bowl history. Blankenship has received considerable media attention for the thick glasses that he wears during games.

== Early life ==
Blankenship was born in Marietta, Georgia, to Ken and Izabella Blankenship. He is of Brazilian descent through his maternal grandparents, who still live there. After spending several years playing soccer, Blankenship began kicking footballs at 10 years old. He attended Sprayberry High School. As a high schooler, Blankenship participated in the 2014–15 U.S. Army All-American Bowl. He was ranked by 247sports.com as the ninth-best kicker in the country.

== College career ==
Blankenship entered Georgia in 2015 as a preferred walk-on and redshirted his first year. As a redshirt freshman, Blankenship earned the starting kicker spot.

During the 2016 season, Blankenship was 14-for-18 on field goals and 26-for-26 on extra points. He led the team in scoring and was named to the All-Southeastern Conference (SEC) Freshman team.

In 2017 – his redshirt sophomore season – Blankenship received a full athletic scholarship. He informed the team of the positive news after Georgia's 20–19 victory over Notre Dame. In the 2018 Rose Bowl, Blankenship made a record-long 55-yard field goal that proved pivotal in shifting the momentum away from Oklahoma, leading to Georgia's eventual 54–48 overtime victory. In the 2018 College Football Playoff National Championship game against Alabama, Blankenship hit a 51-yard field goal in overtime to put the Bulldogs temporarily ahead. However, Georgia ultimately lost the national championship game, 26–23.

Blankenship finished the 2017 season having made 20 of his 23 field goal tries and all 63 extra points attempts. By making 87 percent of his field goals attempts, Blankenship had the sixth-best season in school history. His 67 touchbacks – a dramatic improvement over his 20 touchbacks in 2016 – were also a school record, and they came after he adjusted his technique on kickoffs. He led the SEC in extra point attempts and conversions in the 2017 season.

In July 2018, Blankenship was selected for the preseason All-SEC First Team. During the 2018 season, he went 19-for-23 on field goal attempts and made all 65 of his extra point attempts. Following the 2018 regular season, Blankenship was named to the All-SEC Second Team.

In December 2019, Blankenship won the Lou Groza Award, given to the nation's top placekicker. He also was honored as a member of the SEC Football Community Service Team. In his senior season, Blankenship led the SEC in field goal attempts and conversions.

Notably, Blankenship never missed a single extra point (200/200) in his college career.

== Professional career ==
Pre-draft measurables
Height	Weight	Arm length	Hand span
6 ft 1 in (1.85 m)	190 lb (86 kg)	30 5/8 in (0.78 m)	9 in (0.23 m)
All values from NFL Combine

=== Indianapolis Colts ===
==== 2020 season ====
Blankenship signed with the Indianapolis Colts as an undrafted free agent on April 29, 2020.

In his NFL debut, Blankenship made both extra-point attempts and two of three field goal attempts in a 27–20 loss to the Jacksonville Jaguars, the Jaguars' only win of the season. In Week 11 against the Green Bay Packers, Blankenship kicked a 39 yard game-winning field goal in overtime during the 34–31 victory, later earning the American Football Conference Special Teams Player of the Week award. By the end of the regular season, Blankenship had converted 43 out of 45 extra point attempts and made 32 out of 37 field goal tries, with a long of 53 yards. He was named to the PFWA All-Rookie Team. During the 27–24 road loss to the Buffalo Bills in the Wild Card Round of the playoffs, Blankenship made one of his two field goal attempts and converted his only extra point opportunity.

==== 2021 season ====
Blankenship played the first five games for the Colts before being placed on injured reserve on October 16, 2021, due to a hip injury. He converted seven of eight extra point attempts and 11 of 14 field goal attempts on the season.

==== 2022 season ====
On September 11, in the Colts' season opener against the Houston Texans, Blankenship went 2-for-3 on field goals, kicking two kickoffs out of bounds and missing a potential game-winning 42-yarder in overtime as the game ended in a 20–20 tie. He was waived two days later on September 13.

Blankenship had a tryout with the Jacksonville Jaguars on September 27, 2022.

=== Arizona Cardinals ===
On October 3, Blankenship was among a group of kickers brought in to work out with the Arizona Cardinals after kicker Matt Prater suffered a right hip injury during the Week 4 win against the Carolina Panthers. Blankenship was outperformed by Matt Ammendola, who was chosen as Prater's replacement. However, Ammendola was released on October 17, after missing kicks in the two games he played. The next day, Blankenship was signed to the Cardinals' practice squad.

On October 20, 2022, Blankenship was elevated to the main roster for the Week 7 game against the New Orleans Saints. He made two field goals, one from 50 yards and two out of three extra points in the 42–34 win. Blankenship reverted to the practice squad the next day. He was signed to the active roster on October 26. On November 2, Blankenship was waived with an injury settlement.

=== Tampa Bay Buccaneers ===
On June 15, 2023, Blankenship signed with the Tampa Bay Buccaneers. He was released on August 21, 2023, after losing the kicker competition to Chase McLaughlin.

=== St. Louis Battlehawks ===
On January 8, 2025, Blankenship signed with the St. Louis Battlehawks of the United Football League (UFL). In week 6, Blankenship would make both of his field goal attempts, one being a 53 yard kick. He would be named the special teams player of the week. On June 2, Blankenship was named to the 2025 All-UFL Team.

=== Birmingham Stallions ===
On January 14, 2026, Blankenship was selected by the Birmingham Stallions of the United Football League (UFL).

== Career statistics ==
=== NFL ===
Regular season

Year	Team	GP	Field goals				Extra points			Points
Year	Team	GP	FGA	FGM	Lng	Pct	XPA	XPM	Pct	Points
2020	IND	16	37	32	53	86.5	45	43	95.6	139
2021	IND	5	14	11	48	78.6	8	7	87.5	40
2022	IND	1	3	2	45	66.7	2	2	100.0	8
2022	ARI	2	2	2	50	100.0	3	2	66.7	8
Career		24	56	47	53	83.9	58	54	93.1	195

Postseason

Year	Team	GP	Field goals				Extra points			Points
Year	Team	GP	FGA	FGM	Lng	Pct	XPA	XPM	Pct	Points
2020	IND	1	2	1	30	50.0	1	1	100.0	4
Career		1	2	1	30	50.0	1	1	100.0	4

=== UFL ===
Year	Team	GP	Field goals				Points
Year	Team	GP	FGA	FGM	Lng	Pct	Points
2025	STL	10	22	21	56	95.5	63
Career		10	22	21	56	95.5	63

=== College ===
Season	Team	Conf	Class	Pos	GP	Kicking						
Season	Team	Conf	Class	Pos	GP	XPM	XPA	XP%	FGM	FGA	FG%	Pts
2016	Georgia	SEC	FR	PK	10	26	26	100.0	14	18	77.8	68
2017	Georgia	SEC	SO	PK	15	63	63	100.0	20	23	87.0	123
2018	Georgia	SEC	JR	PK	14	65	65	100.0	19	23	82.6	122
2019	Georgia	SEC	SR	PK	14	46	46	100.0	27	33	81.8	127
Career					53	200	200	100.0	80	97	82.5	440

== Personal life ==
Blankenship's father, Ken, played football at Florida from 1967 to 1969. Ken coached the kickers on every team for which Rodrigo played from fifth grade through the end of high school.

While at Georgia, Blankenship studied digital and broadcast journalism, with a particular focus on sports journalism. On April 16, 2018, Blankenship released a rap song titled "ATD."

Blankenship enjoys LEGO products and speaks frequently about how he loves building up the big models in particular. Blankenship has also formed a friendship with LEGO internet personality Ryan McCullough (MandRproductions). An avid shoe collector, Blankenship has a collection of rare sneakers that he keeps at his home, notably owning sneakers with designs that he matches with his socks. A pet owner, Blankenship owns a cat named Lucas, which he has shown in interviews made at his home.

Blankenship looks up to Eric Dickerson and Kareem Abdul-Jabbar and is noted to wear glasses while playing. He believes that no one should be ashamed to do so and let their performance on the field speak for itself.

In 2020, Blankenship was named Arthur Ashe Jr. Male Sports Scholar of the Year by Diverse: Issues In Higher Education.

Blankenship met Logan Harrell in their sophomore year at Georgia. They got engaged in 2021 and got married in 2022.
