= Solomon Kindley =

American football player (born 1997)

Profile
- Position: Guard

Personal information
- Born: July 3, 1997 (age 29); Jacksonville, Florida, U.S.
- Listed height: 6 ft 4 in (1.93 m)
- Listed weight: 335 lb (152 kg)

Career information
- High school: William M. Raines (Jacksonville)
- College: Georgia (2016–2019)
- NFL draft: 2020: 4th round, 111th overall pick

Career history
- Miami Dolphins (2020–2021); New York Giants (2022)*; DC Defenders (2026)*
- * Offseason or practice squad member only

Career NFL statistics
- Games played: 29
- Games started: 15
- Stats at Pro Football Reference

Solomon Terry Kindley (born July 3, 1997) is an American professional football guard. He played college football at Georgia.

== College career ==
During his redshirt freshman season in 2017, Kindley started 10 games at right guard. After Georgia's regular season loss to Auburn he was replaced by Ben Cleveland, but Kindley won the starting job at left guard in 2018. Kindley was named a team captain in 2019. He started 10 games, missing a game against Tennessee with an ankle sprain. On January 7, 2020, Kindley announced that he would forgo his senior year and declared for the 2020 NFL draft.

== Professional career ==
Pre-draft measurables
| Height | Weight | Arm length | Hand span |
|---|---|---|---|
| 6 ft 3 1/4 in (1.91 m) | 337 lb (153 kg) | 32 1/4 in (0.82 m) | 10 in (0.25 m) |
All values from NFL Combine

=== Miami Dolphins ===
Kindley was selected by the Miami Dolphins in the fourth round (111th overall) of the 2020 NFL Draft. He was placed on the reserve/COVID-19 list by the team on August 6, 2020, and activated two days later.

On August 30, 2022, Kindley was waived by the Dolphins.

=== New York Giants ===
On October 5, 2022, Kindley was signed to the practice squad of the New York Giants. He signed a reserve/future contract on January 11, 2023. He was released on May 5, 2023.

=== DC Defenders ===
On February 3, 2026, Kindley signed with the DC Defenders of the United Football League (UFL). He was released on March 19.
