= Jonathan Ledbetter =

American football player (born 1997)

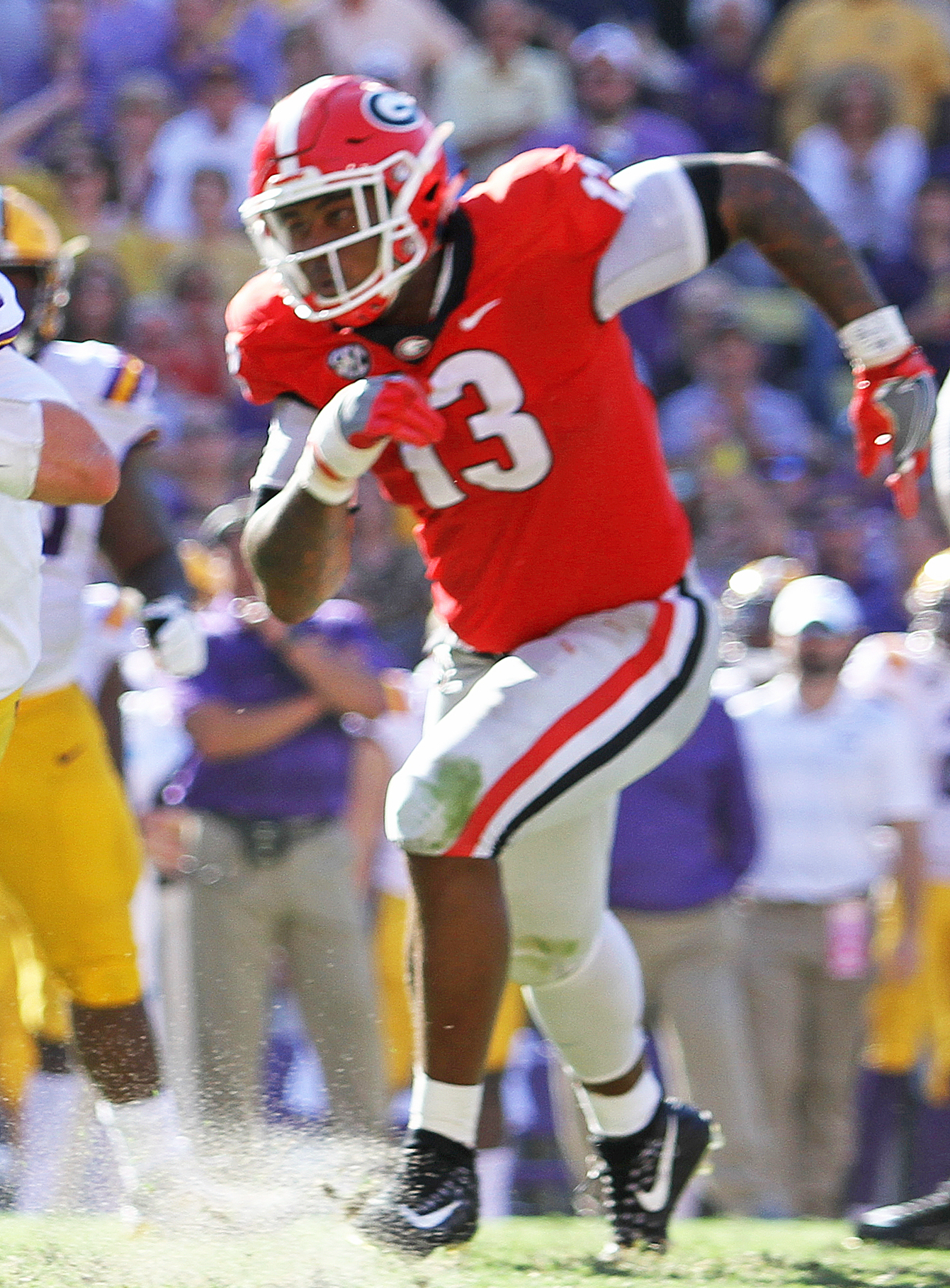
- Ledbetter with the Georgia Bulldogs in 2018

No. 98, 93
- Position: Defensive end

Personal information
- Born: September 12, 1997 (age 29); Atlanta, Georgia, U.S.
- Listed height: 6 ft 4 in (1.93 m)
- Listed weight: 282 lb (128 kg)

Career information
- High school: Tucker (GA)
- College: Georgia
- NFL draft: 2019: undrafted

Career history
- Miami Dolphins (2019–2020); Arizona Cardinals (2021–2023)

Career NFL statistics
- Total tackles: 26
- Sacks: 1.5
- Stats at Pro Football Reference

Jonathan Leroy Ledbetter (born September 12, 1997) is an American former professional football player who was a defensive end in the National Football League (NFL). He played college football for the Georgia Bulldogs.

== Early life ==
Ledbetter grew up in Tucker, Georgia and attended Tucker High School. He was considered by most scouting services to be a top ten defensive end in his class and was selected to play in the 2015 Under Armour All-America Game. Ledbetter initially committed to play college football for the University of Alabama, but de-committed and decided to play at the University of Georgia.

== College career ==
Ledbetter played four seasons for the Georgia Bulldogs. After serving a suspension for the first six games of the season stemming from off the field issues, He entered the starting lineup during his sophomore year and finished the season with 24 tackles and a sack in seven games played. As a junior, making 38 tackles (5.5 for loss) with 2.5 sacks in 15 games (11 starts) in Georgia's run to the Playoff National Championship Game. In his senior season, Ledbetter led all Georgia defensive linemen with 56 tackles and finished second on the team with 6.5 tackles for loss with a sack and two forced fumbles and was named second-team All-Southeastern Conference by the league's coaches. He finished his collegiate career with 122 total tackles, 14.5 tackles for loss, 4.5 sacks, and 2 forced fumbles. Following the end his final season, Ledbetter received an invitation to play in the 2019 Senior Bowl.

== Professional career ==
Pre-draft measurables
Height	Weight	Arm length	Hand span	40-yard dash	10-yard split	20-yard split	20-yard shuttle	Three-cone drill	Vertical jump	Broad jump	Bench press
6 ft 3 3/4 in (1.92 m)	280 lb (127 kg)	34 1/2 in (0.88 m)	9 7/8 in (0.25 m)	5.14 s	1.70 s	2.97 s	4.69 s	7.72 s	26.5 in (0.67 m)	9 ft 0 in (2.74 m)	22 reps

=== Miami Dolphins ===
Ledbetter signed with the Miami Dolphins as an undrafted free agent on April 27, 2019 and made the team out of training camp. Ledbetter made his NFL debut on September 8, 2019, starting at defensive end and making four tackles with a combined sack in a 59-10 loss to the Baltimore Ravens. He was placed on injured reserve on September 12, 2019. He was waived with a non-football injury designation on April 21, 2020, and reverted to the team's reserve/non-football injury list the next day.

On August 31, 2021, Ledbetter was waived by the Dolphins.

=== Arizona Cardinals ===
On September 3, 2021, Ledbetter was signed to the practice squad of the Arizona Cardinals. On February 9, 2022, Ledbetter signed a reserve/future contract.

Ledbetter made the Cardinals roster in 2022 as a backup defensive end. He played in 14 games with three starts, recording 22 tackles and one sack. On January 7, 2023, he was placed on season–ending injured reserve after suffering a knee injury against the Atlanta Falcons.

Ledbetter entered the 2023 season as a starting defensive end. In 12 starts, he recorded 46 tackles and 1.5 sacks.

== Personal life ==
Ledbetter's older brother, Joseph, played basketball at Pfeiffer University for two years before transferring Georgia and joining the Bulldogs football team as a tight end.

Ledbetter was arrested on March 20, 2016 for possession fake ID and underage possession of alcohol. The charges were later dropped, but he was originally suspended for the Georgia's season opener. That same offseason, Ledbetter was arrest for driving under the influence on July 10, 2016 after he was found asleep behind the wheel of his car by police. He was suspended indefinitely by head coach Kirby Smart, missing the first six games of the 2016 season before being reinstated by the program on October 11, 2016 after completing an education, counseling and medical assistance program.
