= Jayson Stanley =

American football player (born 1997)

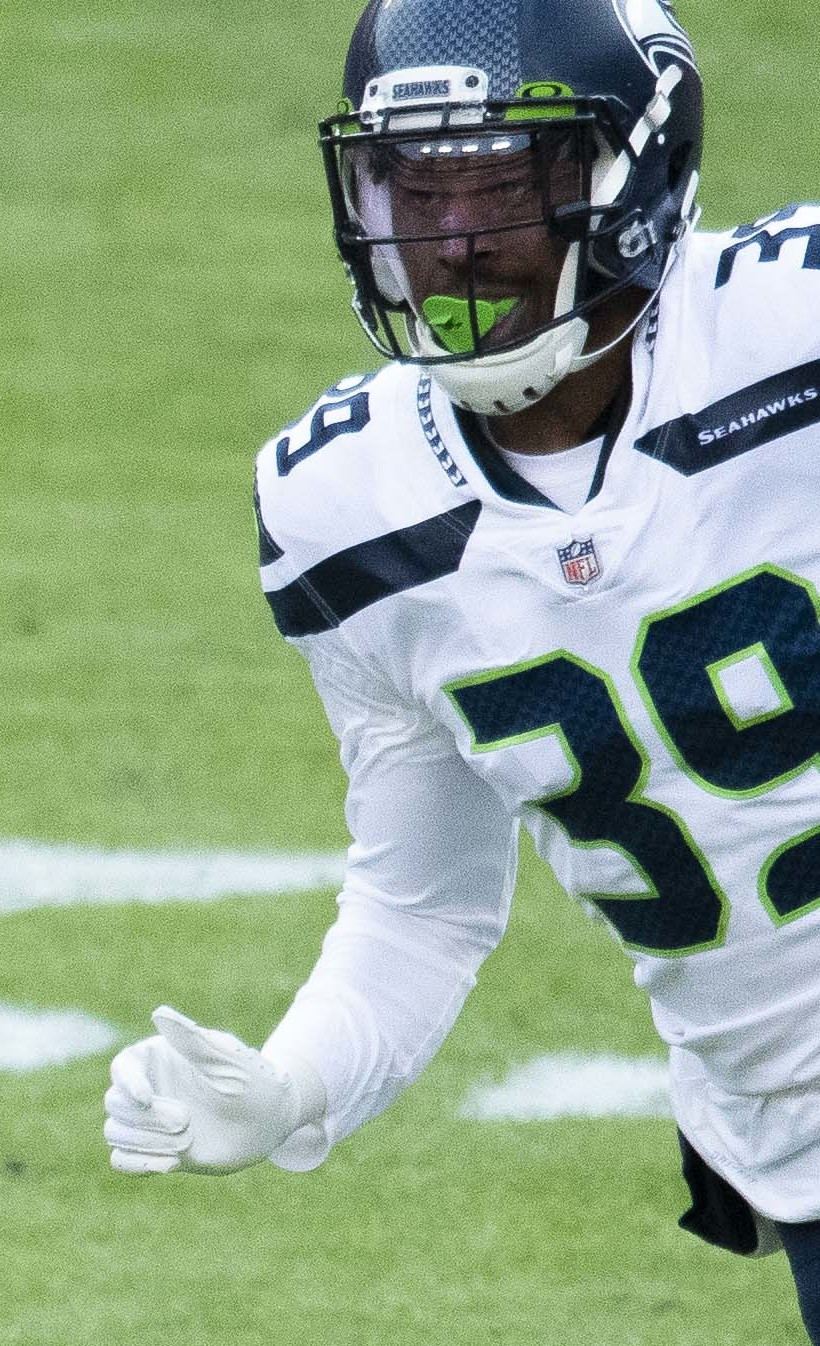
- Stanley with the Seattle Seahawks in 2020

Profile
- Position: Cornerback

Personal information
- Born: April 24, 1997 (age 29); Fairburn, Georgia, U.S.
- Listed height: 6 ft 2 in (1.88 m)
- Listed weight: 209 lb (95 kg)

Career information
- High school: Creekside (Fairburn, Georgia)
- College: Georgia
- NFL draft: 2019: undrafted

Career history
- Atlanta Falcons (2019)*; Miami Dolphins (2019)*; Jacksonville Jaguars (2019–2020)*; Seattle Seahawks (2020); Green Bay Packers (2021)*; Chicago Bears (2022)*
- * Offseason or practice squad member only
- Stats at Pro Football Reference

Jayson Kyle Stanley (born April 24, 1997) is an American football cornerback. He was signed by the Atlanta Falcons as an undrafted free agent in 2019 following his college football career with the Georgia Bulldogs.

== Professional career ==
=== Atlanta Falcons ===
Stanley signed with the Atlanta Falcons as an undrafted free agent following the 2019 NFL draft on April 29, 2019. He was waived during final roster cuts with an injury settlement on August 31, 2019.

=== Miami Dolphins ===
Stanley signed to the Miami Dolphins' practice squad on October 16, 2019, and was released on October 30.

=== Jacksonville Jaguars ===
Stanley signed to the Jacksonville Jaguars' practice squad on December 19, 2019. After the 2019 NFL season, he signed a reserve/futures contract with the Jaguars on January 2, 2020. He was waived on April 27, 2020.

=== Seattle Seahawks ===
The Seattle Seahawks claimed Stanley off waivers from the Jaguars on April 28, 2020. He was waived during final roster cuts on September 5, 2020, and signed to the practice squad the next day. He was elevated to the active roster on October 31 and November 7 for the team's weeks 8 and 9 games against the San Francisco 49ers and Buffalo Bills, and reverted to the practice squad after each game. He was signed to the active roster on November 19, 2020. He was placed on injured reserve on January 6, 2021.

=== Green Bay Packers ===
On December 29, 2021, Stanley was signed to the Green Bay Packers practice squad. He was released on January 4, 2022.

=== Chicago Bears ===
On June 21, 2022, Stanley signed with the Chicago Bears. He was waived/injured on August 16, 2022, and placed on injured reserve. He was released with an injury settlement on August 25.
