= Terry Godwin =

American football player (born 1996)

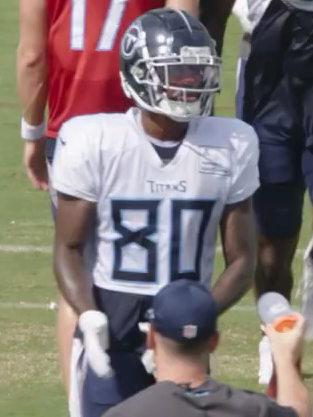
- Godwin with the Tennessee Titans in 2022

No. 14, 80, 17
- Position: Wide receiver

Personal information
- Born: October 23, 1996 (age 30); Hogansville, Georgia, U.S.
- Listed height: 5 ft 11 in (1.80 m)
- Listed weight: 185 lb (84 kg)

Career information
- High school: Callaway (Hogansville)
- College: Georgia (2015–2018)
- NFL draft: 2019: 7th round, 237th overall pick

Career history
- Carolina Panthers (2019)*; Jacksonville Jaguars (2019–2021); Tennessee Titans (2022)*; Hamilton Tiger-Cats (2022–2023)
- * Offseason or practice squad member only

Career NFL statistics
- Receptions: 3
- Receiving yards: 32
- Stats at Pro Football Reference

Career CFL statistics
- Targets: 10
- Receptions: 6
- Receiving yards: 110

Terry Tyrome Godwin (born October 23, 1996) is an American former professional football player who was a wide receiver in the National Football League (NFL) and Canadian Football League (CFL). He played college football for the Georgia Bulldogs and was selected by the Carolina Panthers in the seventh round of the 2019 NFL draft. He has also been a member of the Jacksonville Jaguars, Tennessee Titans, and Hamilton Tiger-Cats.

== Professional career ==
Pre-draft measurables
| Height | Weight | Arm length | Hand span | 40-yard dash | 10-yard split | 20-yard split | 20-yard shuttle | Three-cone drill | Vertical jump | Broad jump |
|---|---|---|---|---|---|---|---|---|---|---|
| 5 ft 11 3/8 in (1.81 m) | 184 lb (83 kg) | 30 in (0.76 m) | 9 3/8 in (0.24 m) | 4.55 s | 1.58 s | 2.67 s | 4.18 s | 6.96 s | 36.5 in (0.93 m) | 9 ft 9 in (2.97 m) |

=== Carolina Panthers ===
Godwin was selected by the Carolina Panthers in the seventh round (237th overall) of the 2019 NFL draft. He was waived during final roster cuts on August 31, 2019.

=== Jacksonville Jaguars ===
On September 10, 2019, Godwin was signed to the practice squad of the Jacksonville Jaguars. His practice squad contract with the team expired after the season on January 6, 2020.

Godwin was re-signed by the Jaguars on March 26, 2020. He was waived on September 5, 2020, and re-signed to the practice squad the next day. He was placed on the practice squad/COVID-19 list by the team on October 17, 2020, and was activated back to the practice squad on October 22. He was elevated to the active roster on November 14 and November 21 for the team's weeks 10 and 11 games against the Green Bay Packers and Pittsburgh Steelers, and reverted to the practice squad after each game. He was placed back on the practice squad/COVID-19 list on December 18, 2020, and restored to the practice squad again on December 30. He was promoted to the active roster on January 2, 2021. On June 3, 2021, Godwin was placed on injured reserve.

On March 15, 2022, Godwin signed a one-year contract extension with the Jaguars. He was released on May 16, 2022.

=== Tennessee Titans ===
Godwin was signed by the Tennessee Titans on July 28, 2022. He was waived on August 22, 2022.

=== Hamilton Tiger-Cats ===
On September 12, 2022, Godwin signed with the Hamilton Tiger-Cats of the Canadian Football League (CFL). He was released on May 12, 2024.
