= D'Andre Walker =

American football player (born 1997)

No. 59
- Position: Linebacker

Personal information
- Born: January 23, 1997 (age 29); Fairburn, Georgia, U.S.
- Listed height: 6 ft 2 in (1.88 m)
- Listed weight: 251 lb (114 kg)

Career information
- High school: Langston Hughes (Fairburn)
- College: Georgia (2015–2018)
- NFL draft: 2019: 5th round, 168th overall pick

Career history
- Tennessee Titans (2019); Seattle Seahawks (2020)
- Stats at Pro Football Reference

D'Andre Walker (born January 23, 1997) is an American former professional football player who was a linebacker in the National Football League (NFL). He played college football for the Georgia Bulldogs. He was selected by the Tennessee Titans in the fifth round of the 2019 NFL draft.

== Early life ==
Walker attended Langston Hughes High School in Fairburn, Georgia. He committed to the University of Georgia to play college football.

== College career ==
Walker played at Georgia from 2015 to 2018. During his career, he had 112 tackles with 13.5 sacks.

== Professional career ==
Pre-draft measurables
Height	Weight	Arm length	Hand span
6 ft 2 3/8 in (1.89 m)	251 lb (114 kg)	34 3/8 in (0.87 m)	9 7/8 in (0.25 m)
All values from NFL Combine

=== Tennessee Titans ===
Walker was selected by the Tennessee Titans in the fifth round (168th overall) of the 2019 NFL draft. He agreed to a four-year rookie contract worth $2,786,749 with a signing bonus of $266,749 and a 2019 cap hit of $561,687. He was placed on injured reserve on August 10, 2019.

Walker was waived by the Titans on September 5, 2020.

=== Seattle Seahawks ===
Walker was claimed off waivers by the Seattle Seahawks on September 6, 2020. He was waived on September 29, 2020.
