= Riley Ridley =

American football player (born 1996)

No. 88
- Position: Wide receiver

Personal information
- Born: July 21, 1996 (age 30); Deerfield Beach, Florida, U.S.
- Listed height: 6 ft 1 in (1.85 m)
- Listed weight: 200 lb (91 kg)

Career information
- High school: Deerfield Beach
- College: Georgia (2016–2018)
- NFL draft: 2019: 4th round, 126th overall pick

Career history
- Chicago Bears (2019–2020)

Career NFL statistics
- Receptions: 10
- Receiving yards: 108
- Stats at Pro Football Reference

Cavin Riley Ridley (born July 21, 1996) is an American former professional football player who was a wide receiver in the National Football League (NFL). He played college football for the Georgia Bulldogs. His brother, Calvin, plays for the Tennessee Titans.

== Early life ==
Ridley attended Deerfield Beach High School in Deerfield Beach, Florida. He was a four-star wide receiver coming out of high school with over 13 offers, including those from Georgia, Alabama, and Auburn. Ultimately, Ridley committed to the University of Georgia to play college football.

== College career ==
Ridley played in 11 games as a true freshman at Georgia in 2016, catching 12 passes for 238 yards and two touchdowns. As a sophomore in 2017, he had 14 receptions for 218 yards and two touchdowns. As a junior in 2018, Ridley had 43 receptions for 559 yards and nine touchdowns. After the season, he decided to forgo his senior year and enter the 2019 NFL draft.

== Professional career ==
Pre-draft measurables
| Height | Weight | Arm length | Hand span | Wingspan | 40-yard dash | 10-yard split | 20-yard split | 20-yard shuttle | Three-cone drill | Vertical jump | Broad jump | Bench press |
|---|---|---|---|---|---|---|---|---|---|---|---|---|
| 6 ft 1 1/4 in (1.86 m) | 199 lb (90 kg) | 32 5/8 in (0.83 m) | 10 1/4 in (0.26 m) | 6 ft 6 1/4 in (1.99 m) | 4.58 s | 1.57 s | 2.69 s | 4.28 s | 7.22 s | 30.5 in (0.77 m) | 10 ft 4 in (3.15 m) | 13 reps |
All values from NFL Combine

Ridley was selected by the Chicago Bears in the fourth round (126th overall) of the 2019 NFL Draft. He signed his rookie contract, worth $3.2 million over 4 years with a $682.5k signing bonus, on May 13.

During his rookie year, Ridley was active for just one of the first eleven games of the 2019 season: a Week 4 against the Minnesota Vikings. Due to injuries to the wide receiver corps, he began seeing increased action starting in Week 13 against the Detroit Lions, and caught his first career pass the following week against the Dallas Cowboys.

He was waived during the Bears final cuts on August 31, 2021.

=== Statistics ===
| Year | Team | Games | | Receiving | | | | |
| Year | Team | GP | GS | Rec | Yds | Avg | Lng | TD |
|---|---|---|---|---|---|---|---|---|
| 2019 | CHI | 5 | 0 | 6 | 69 | 11.5 | 32 | 0 |
| 2020 | CHI | 5 | 1 | 4 | 39 | 9.8 | 18 | 0 |
| Career | | 10 | 1 | 10 | 108 | 10.8 | 32 | 0 |
Postseason
| 2020 | CHI | 1 | 1 | 2 | 36 | 18.0 | 18 | 0 |
| Career | | 1 | 1 | 2 | 36 | 18.0 | 18 | 0 |

== Personal life ==
His brother, Calvin Ridley, also plays wide receiver in the NFL for the Tennessee Titans .
