= Vanderbilt Commodores football statistical leaders =

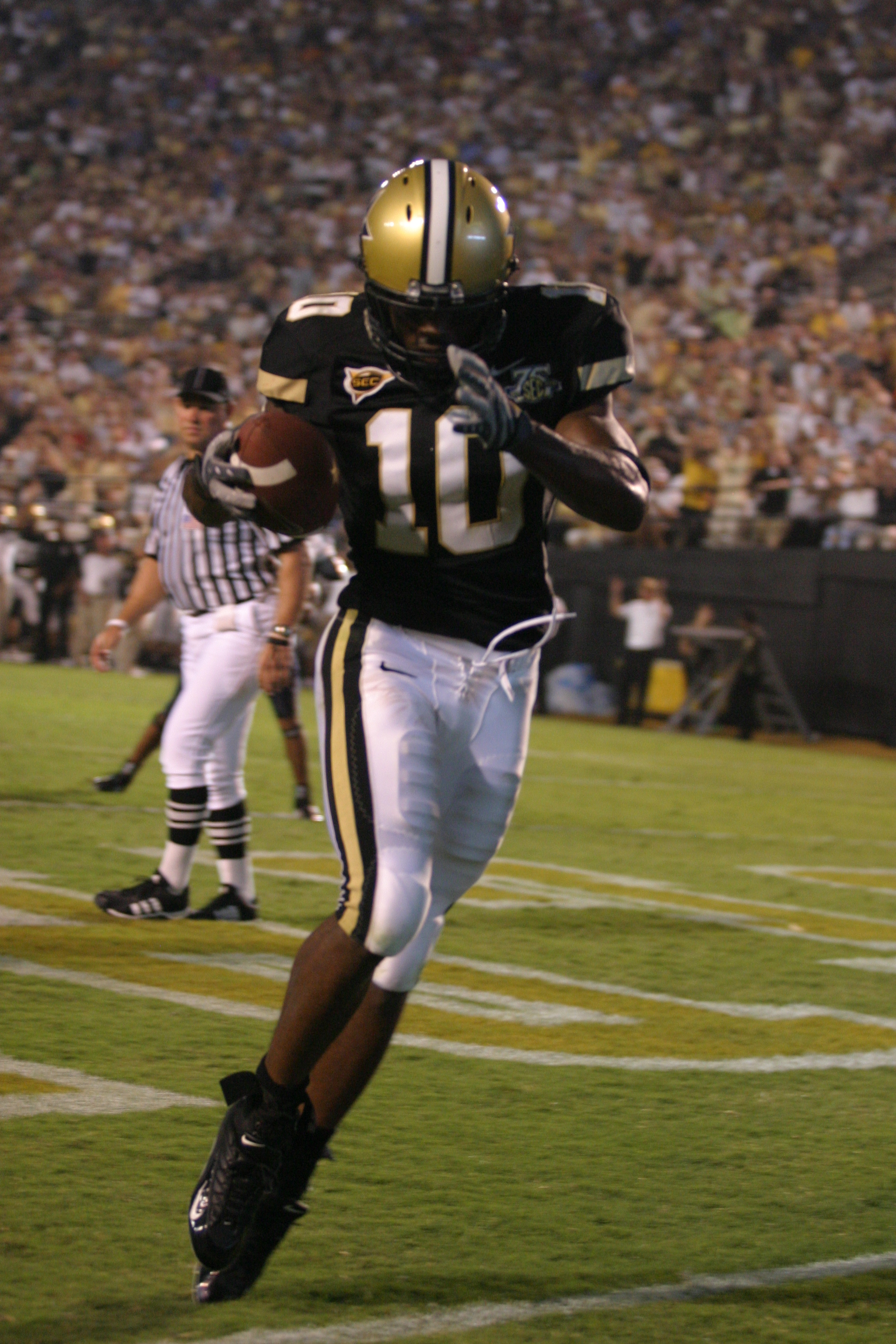
Earl Bennett's 236 career receptions were a record until Jordan Matthews broke it 6 years later.

The Vanderbilt Commodores football statistical leaders are individual statistical leaders of the Vanderbilt Commodores football program in various categories, including passing, rushing, receiving, total offense, defensive stats, and kicking. Within those areas, the lists identify single-game, Single season and career leaders. The Commodores represent Vanderbilt University in the NCAA Division I FBS Southeastern Conference.

Although Vanderbilt began competing in intercollegiate football in 1890, the school's official record book considers the "modern era" to have begun in 1946. Records from before this year are often incomplete and inconsistent, and they are generally not included in these lists.

These lists are dominated by more recent players for several reasons:

- Since 1950, seasons have increased from 10 games to 11 and then 12 games in length.
- The NCAA didn't allow freshmen to play varsity football until 1972 (with the exception of the World War II years), allowing players to have four-year careers.
- From 2018 through 2025, players were allowed to participate in as many as four games in a redshirt season; previously, playing in even one game "burned" the redshirt. In 2024 and 2025, postseason games did not count against the four-game limit. These changes to redshirt rules have given very recent players several extra games to accumulate statistics.
- A more recent change likely to significantly affect future career leaderboards was introduced in 2026 with full implementation starting with the 2027 freshman class. Going forward, redshirting will be prohibited, but players will have five years of full athletic eligibility, provided that they are no older than 19 when they first enroll in a postsecondary institution. Players who had remaining eligibility under previous rules at the end of the 2025 season will benefit from the new rule.
- Bowl games only began counting toward single-season and career statistics in 2002. The Commodores have played in eight bowl games since then.
- Due to COVID-19 issues, the NCAA ruled that the 2020 season would not count against the athletic eligibility of any football player, giving everyone who played in that season the opportunity for five years of eligibility instead of the normal four.
- The 2011, 2012, and 2013 seasons, all played under head coach James Franklin, were at the time the three highest-scoring Commodore seasons of the modern era, and three of the four seasons with the most offensive yards. The 2025 team, under head coach Clark Lea, set a new record for total points even before the end of the regular season and ended with the highest per-game average.

The statistics below are updated through Week 12 of the 2026 season. Active players are in bold.

== Passing ==
=== Passing yards ===
Career
Rank	Player	Yards	Years
1	Kyle Shurmur	8,865	2015 2016 2017 2018
2	Jay Cutler	8,697	2002 2003 2004 2005
3	Greg Zolman	7,981	1998 1999 2000 2001
4	Whit Taylor	6,307	1979 1980 1981 1982
5	Kurt Page	6,233	1981 1982 1983 1984
6	Diego Pavia	5,832	2024 2025
7	Eric Jones	5,029	1986 1987 1988
8	Ken Seals	4,292	2020 2021 2023
9	Jordan Rodgers	4,063	2011 2012
10	Damian Allen	3,704	1994 1995 1996 1997

Single season
Rank	Player	Yards	Year
1	Diego Pavia	3,539	2025
2	Kurt Page	3,178	1983
3	Kyle Shurmur	3,130	2018
4	Jay Cutler	3,073	2005
5	Kyle Shurmur	2,823	2017
6	Eric Jones	2,548	1988
7	Jordan Rodgers	2,539	2012
8	Greg Zolman	2,512	2001
9	Whit Taylor	2,481	1982
10	Greg Zolman	2,441	2000

Single game
Rank	Player	Yards	Year	Opponent
1	Diego Pavia	484	2025	Kentucky
2	Whit Taylor	464	1981	Tennessee
3	Whit Taylor	452	1982	Air Force
4	Chris Nickson	446	2006	Kentucky
5	Greg Zolman	441	2001	Kentucky
6	Kyle Shurmur	416	2016	Tennessee
7	Jay Cutler	395	2005	Kentucky
8	Whit Taylor	391	1982	Tennessee
9	Riley Neal	378	2019	Purdue
10	Diego Pavia	377	2025	Auburn

=== Passing touchdowns ===
Career
Rank	Player	TDs	Years
1	Kyle Shurmur	64	2015 2016 2017 2018
2	Jay Cutler	59	2002 2003 2004 2005
3	Diego Pavia	49	2024 2025
4	Whit Taylor	41	1979 1980 1981 1982
	Greg Zolman	41	1998 1999 2000 2001
6	Kurt Page	35	1981 1982 1983 1984
7	Eric Jones	32	1986 1987 1988
8	Bill Wade	31	1949 1950 1951
9	Chris Nickson	29	2005 2006 2007 2008
10	Ken Seals	28	2020 2021 2023

Single season
Rank	Player	TDs	Year
1	Diego Pavia	29	2025
2	Kyle Shurmur	26	2017
3	Kyle Shurmur	24	2018
4	Jay Cutler	21	2005
5	Diego Pavia	20	2024
6	Jay Cutler	18	2003
7	Kurt Page	16	1983
	Eric Jones	16	1987
9	Whit Taylor	15	1981
	Chris Nickson	15	2006
	Jordan Rodgers	15	2012

Single game
Rank	Player	TDs	Year	Opponent
1	Bill Wade	5	1950	Auburn
	Jay Cutler	5	2005	Kentucky
	Johnny McCrary	5	2014	Old Dominion
	Diego Pavia	5	2025	Utah State
	Diego Pavia	5	2025	Kentucky
6	10 times by 6 players	4	Most recent: AJ Swann, 2022 vs. Northern Illinois	

== Rushing ==
=== Rushing yards ===
Career
Rank	Player	Yards	Years
1	Ralph Webb	4,173	2014 2015 2016 2017
2	Zac Stacy	3,143	2009 2010 2011 2012
3	Frank Mordica	2,632	1976 1977 1978 1979
4	Carl Woods	2,490	1983 1984 1985 1986
5	Ke'Shawn Vaughn	2,272	2018 2019
6	Jamie O’Rourke	2,202	1971 1973 1974
7	Jermaine Johnson	2,152	1993 1994 1995
8	Jared McGrath	2,151	1997 1998 1999 2000
9	Lonnie Sadler	2,096	1972 1973 1974 1975
10	Rodney Williams	2,021	1998 1999 2000 2001

Single season
Rank	Player	Yards	Year
1	Ralph Webb	1,384	2016
2	Ke'Shawn Vaughn	1,244	2018
3	Zac Stacy	1,193	2011
4	Ralph Webb	1,152	2015
5	Zac Stacy	1,141	2012
6	Corey Harris	1,103	1991
7	Jermaine Johnson	1,072	1995
8	Frank Mordica	1,065	1978
9	Ray Davis	1,042	2022
10	Ke'Shawn Vaughn	1,028	2019

Single game
Rank	Player	Yards	Year	Opponent
1	Frank Mordica	321	1978	Air Force
2	Ke'Shawn Vaughn	243	2018	Baylor
3	Doug Mathews	214	1969	Tulane
4	Ralph Webb	198	2016	Middle Tennessee
5	Zac Stacy	198	2011	Army
6	Jamie O’Rourke	187	1971	Tulane
	Frank Mordica	187	1979	Citadel
8	Zac Stacy	184	2011	Wake Forest
9	Corey Harris	180	1991	Army
	Zac Stacy	180	2012	Wake Forest

=== Rushing touchdowns ===
Career
Rank	Player	TDs	Years
1	Ralph Webb	32	2014 2015 2016 2017
2	Zac Stacy	30	2009 2010 2011 2012
3	**Sedrick Alexander**	27	2023 2024 2025 2026
4	Marcus Wilson	24	1989 1990 1991 1992
5	Steve Burger	21	1970 1971 1972
	Ke'Shawn Vaughn	21	2018 2019
7	Jamie O’Rourke	20	1971 1973 1974
8	Jerron Seymour	19	2011 2013 2014
9	Frank Mordica	18	1976 1977 1978 1979
	Cassen Jackson-Garrison	18	2004 2005 2006 2007
	Diego Pavia	18	2024 2025

Single season
Rank	Player	TDs	Year
1	Zac Stacy	14	2011
	Jerron Seymour	14	2013
3	Ronnie Gordon	13	1994
	Ralph Webb	14	2016
5	Jamie O'Rourke	12	1974
	Ke'Shawn Vaughn	12	2018
7	Marcus Wilson	11	1991
	**Sedrick Alexander**	11	2025
9	Steve Burger	10	1970
	Zac Stacy	10	2012
	Khari Blasingame	10	2016
	Ralph Webb	10	2017
	Diego Pavia	10	2025

Single game
Rank	Player	TDs	Year	Opponent
1	Frank Mordica	5	1978	Air Force

== Receiving ==
=== Receptions ===
Career
Rank	Player	Rec	Years
1	Jordan Matthews	262	2010 2011 2012 2013
2	Earl Bennett	236	2005 2006 2007
3	Keith Edwards	200	1980 1982 1983
4	Kalija Lipscomb	198	2016 2017 2018 2019
5	Boo Mitchell	188	1985 1986 1987 1988
6	Dan Stricker	182	1999 2000 2001 2002
7	**Junior Sherrill**	172	2023 2024 2025 2026
8	Will Sheppard	152	2020 2021 2022 2023
9	Chuck Scott	145	1981 1982 1983 1984
10	Everett Crawford	143	1984 1985 1986 1987

Single season
Rank	Player	Rec	Year
1	Jordan Matthews	112	2013
2	Keith Edwards	97	1983
3	Jordan Matthews	94	2012
4	Kalija Lipscomb	87	2018
5	Earl Bennett	82	2006
6	Bob Goodridge	79	1967
	Earl Bennett	79	2005
8	Boo Mitchell	78	1988
9	Earl Bennett	75	2007
10	Chuck Scott	70	1983

Single game
Rank	Player	Rec	Year	Opponent
1	Norman Jordan	20	1982	Air Force
2	Trent Sherfield	16	2015	Austin Peay

=== Receiving yards ===
Career
Rank	Player	Yards	Years
1	Jordan Matthews	3,759	2010 2011 2012 2013
2	Boo Mitchell	2,964	1985 1986 1987 1988
3	Dan Stricker	2,880	1999 2000 2001 2002
4	Earl Bennett	2,852	2005 2006 2007
5	**Junior Sherrill**	2,484	2023 2024 2025 2026
6	Kalija Lipscomb	2,356	2016 2017 2018 2019
7	Martin Cox	2,275	1975 1976 1977 1978
8	Chuck Scott	2,219	1981 1982 1983 1984
9	Will Sheppard	2,067	2020 2021 2022 2023
10	Clarence Sevillian	1,978	1989 1990 1991 1992

Single season
Rank	Player	Yards	Year
1	Jordan Matthews	1,477	2013
2	Jordan Matthews	1,323	2012
3	Boo Mitchell	1,213	1988
4	Earl Bennett	1,146	2006
5	Bob Goodridge	1,114	1967
6	Dan Stricker	1,079	2001
7	**Junior Sherrill**	996	2026
8	Dan Stricker	994	2000
9	Chuck Scott	975	1984
10	Chuck Scott	971	1983

Single game
Rank	Player	Yards	Year	Opponent
1	Trent Sherfield	240	2015	Austin Peay
2	Earl Bennett	223	2007	Richmond
3	Clarence Sevillian	222	1992	Tennessee
4	Earl Bennett	220	2006	Kentucky
5	M.J. Garrett	219	2001	Middle Tennessee
6	Dan Stricker	204	2001	Duke
	Earl Bennett	204	2005	South Carolina
8	Bob Goodridge	201	1967	Navy
9	Bucky Curtis	196	1950	Alabama
10	Boo Mitchell	184	1985	Kansas
	Earl Bennett	184	2006	Duke
	Trent Sherfield	184	2016	Tennessee

=== Receiving touchdowns ===
Career
Rank	Player	TDs	Years
1	Jordan Matthews	24	2010 2011 2012 2013
2	Kalija Lipscomb	22	2016 2017 2018 2019
3	Dan Stricker	21	1999 2000 2001 2002
	Will Sheppard	21	2020 2021 2022 2023
5	Chuck Scott	20	1981 1982 1983 1984
	Earl Bennett	20	2005 2006 2007
7	Allama Matthews	18	1981 1982
	**Junior Sherrill**	18	2023 2024 2025 2026
9	Carl Parker	16	1983 1985 1986 1987
10	Erik Davis	14	2002 2003 2004 2005

Single season
Rank	Player	TDs	Year
1	Allama Matthews	14	1982
2	Carl Parker	12	1987
3	Bucky Curtis	9	1950
	Chuck Scott	9	1983
	Earl Bennett	9	2005
	Kalija Lipscomb	9	2018
	Will Sheppard	9	2022
8	Chuck Scott	8	1984
	Dan Stricker	8	2001
	Erik Davis	8	2003
	Chris Boyd	8	2011
	Jordan Matthews	8	2012
	Kalija Lipscomb	8	2017
	Will Sheppard	8	2023

Single game
Rank	Player	TDs	Year	Opponent
1	Earl Bennett	5	2005	Kentucky

== Total offense ==
Total offense is the sum of passing and rushing statistics. It does not include receiving or returns.

=== Total offense yards ===
Career
Rank	Player	Yards	Years
1	Jay Cutler	9,953	2002 2003 2004 2005
2	Kyle Shurmur	8,539	2015 2016 2017 2018
3	Greg Zolman	7,707	1998 1999 2000 2001
4	Diego Pavia	7,494	2024 2025
5	Whit Taylor	6,727	1979 1980 1981 1982
6	Eric Jones	6,240	1986 1987 1988
7	Kurt Page	6,008	1981 1982 1983 1984
8	Chris Nickson	4,869	2005 2006 2007 2008
9	Jordan Rodgers	4,554	2011 2012
10	Ken Seals	4,231	2020 2021 2023

Single season
Rank	Player	Yards	Year
1	Diego Pavia	4,401	2025
2	Jay Cutler	3,288	2005
3	Diego Pavia	3,093	2024
4	Kyle Shurmur	3,050	2018
5	Kurt Page	3,034	1983
6	Eric Jones	2,853	1988
7	Chris Nickson	2,779	2006
8	Kyle Shurmur	2,739	2017
9	Whit Taylor	2,679	1982
10	Jay Cutler	2,646	2003

Single game
Rank	Player	Yards	Year	Opponent
1	Diego Pavia	532	2025	Kentucky
2	Whit Taylor	521	1981	Tennessee

=== Touchdowns responsible for ===
"Touchdowns responsible for" is the NCAA's official designation for combined passing and rushing touchdowns.

Career
Rank	Player	TDs	Years
1	Jay Cutler	76	2002 2003 2004 2005
2	Kyle Shurmur	67	2015 2016 2017 2018
	Diego Pavia	67	2024 2025
4	Greg Zolman	53	1998 1999 2000 2001
5	Whit Taylor	46	1979 1980 1981 1982
	Chris Nickson	46	2005 2006 2007 2008
7	Eric Jones	45	1986 1987 1988
8	Kurt Page	38	1981 1982 1983 1984
9	Marcus Wilson	32	1989 1990 1991 1992
10	Zac Stacy	31	2009 2010 2011 2012
	Ken Seals	31	2020 2021 2023

Single season
Rank	Player	TDs	Year
1	Diego Pavia	39	2025
2	Kyle Shurmur	29	2017
3	Diego Pavia	28	2024
4	Whit Taylor	24	1982
	Chris Nickson	24	2006
	Kyle Shurmur	24	2018
7	Eric Jones	22	1987
	Jay Cutler	22	2005
9	Greg Zolman	19	2001
	Jay Cutler	19	2002
	Jay Cutler	19	2003

Single game
Rank	Player	TDs	Year	Opponent
1	Mike Wright	6	2022	Elon
	Diego Pavia	6	2025	Utah State
	Diego Pavia	6	2025	Kentucky
4	Bill Wade	5	1950	Auburn
	Frank Mordica	5	1978	Air Force
	Jay Cutler	5	2005	Kentucky
	Johnny McCrary	5	2014	Old Dominion
	Kyle Shurmur	5	2017	Alabama A&M
	Diego Pavia	5	2024	Georgia Tech

== Defense ==
=== Interceptions ===
Career
Rank	Player	Ints	Years
1	Leonard Coleman	15	1980 1981 1982 1983
	Casey Hayward	15	2008 2009 2010 2011
3	Donald Gleisner	13	1950 1951 1952
	Ken Stone	13	1970 1971 1972
	D.J. Moore	13	2006 2007 2008
6	Corey Chavous	12	1994 1995 1996 1997
7	Christie Hauck	11	1967 1968 1969
	Manuel Young	11	1981 1982 1983 1984
	Reshard Langford	11	2005 2006 2007 2008

Single season
Rank	Player	Ints	Year
1	Scott Wingfield	8	1973
	Leonard Coleman	8	1982
3	Donald Gleisner	7	1952
	Ed Oaks	7	1975
	Casey Hayward	7	2011
6	David Malone	6	1964
	D.J. Moore	6	2007
	D.J. Moore	6	2008
	Casey Hayward	6	2010

Single game
Rank	Player	Ints	Year	Opponent
1	Scott Wingfield	3	1973	Virginia
	John Chandler	3	1979	Memphis
	Leonard Coleman	3	1980	Chattanooga
	Chris Donnelly	3	1989	Memphis
	Ryan Hamilton	3	2008	Ole Miss

=== Tackles ===
Career
Rank	Player	Tackles	Years
1	Andrew Coleman	458	1978 1979 1980 1981

Single season
Rank	Player	Tackles	Year
1	Chris Gaines	214	1987

Single game
Rank	Player	Tackles	Year	Opponent
1	Chris Gaines	37	1987	Tulane

=== Sacks ===
Career
Rank	Player	Sacks	Years
1	Alan Young	21.5	1990 1991 1992 1993

Single season
Rank	Player	Sacks	Year
1	Alan Young	12.0	1993

== Kicking ==
=== Field goals made ===
Career
Rank	Player	FGs	Years
1	**Brock Taylor**	50	2024 2025 2026
2	John Markham	47	1997 1998 1999 2000
3	Bryant Hahnfeldt	46	2005 2006 2007 2008
4	Ricky Anderson	40	1982 1983 1984
5	Carey Spear	39	2010 2011 2012 2013
6	Tommy Openshaw	38	2014 2015 2016 2017
7	Johnny Clark	36	1987 1988 1989
8	Ryan Fowler	28	2009 2010 2011 2012
9	Mike Woodard	24	1978 1979 1980 1981
10	Mike Adams	23	1974 1975

Single season
Rank	Player	FGs	Year
1	Carey Spear	20	2012
2	**Brock Taylor**	19	2026
3	Brock Taylor	18	2024
4	Ricky Anderson	16	1984
	Ryan Fowler	16	2009
6	Carey Spear	15	2013
	Tommy Openshaw	15	2016
8	Ricky Anderson	14	1982
	Johnny Clark	14	1987
	John Markham	14	2000
	Joseph Bulovas	14	2021

Single game
Rank	Player	FGs	Year	Opponent
1	Brock Taylor	6	2026	Mississippi State
2	Hawkins Golden	4	1973	Georgia
	John Markham	4	2000	Duke

=== Field goal percentage ===
Career
Rank	Player	FG%	Years
1	**Brock Taylor**	87.7%	2024 2025 2026
2	Carey Spear	78.0%	2010 2011 2012 2013
3	Jeff Owen	72.0%	1988 1989 1990 1991
4	Mike Adams	71.9%	1974 1975
5	Ricky Anderson	70.2%	1982 1983 1984
6	Hawkins Golden	69.6%	1972 1973
7	Johnny Clark	69.2%	1987 1988 1989
8	John Markham	69.1%	1997 1998 1999 2000
9	Ryan Fowler	68.3%	2009 2010 2011 2012
10	Tommy Openshaw	67.9%	2014 2015 2016 2017

Single season
Rank	Player	FG%	Year
1	Brock Taylor	92.9%	2025
2	**Brock Taylor**	86.3%	2026
3	Hawkins Golden	85.7%	1973
	Brock Taylor	85.7%	2024
5	Mike Adams	84.6%	1974
6	Ricky Anderson	84.2%	1984
7	Carey Spear	83.3%	2012
8	Ryley Guay	81.8%	2019
9	Mike Woodard	80.0%	1981
10	Carey Spear	78.9%	2013
	Tommy Openshaw	78.9%	2016
