= List of Vanderbilt Commodores in the NFL draft =

This is a list of Vanderbilt Commodores football players in the NFL draft.

== Key ==
| B | Back | K | Kicker | NT | Nose tackle |
| C | Center | LB | Linebacker | FB | Fullback |
| DB | Defensive back | P | Punter | HB | Halfback |
| DE | Defensive end | QB | Quarterback | WR | Wide receiver |
| DT | Defensive tackle | RB | Running back | G | Guard |
| E | End | T | Offensive tackle | TE | Tight end |

== Selections ==
| Year | Round | Pick | Player | Team | Position |
|---|---|---|---|---|---|
| 1937 | 3 | 28 | Dick Plasman | Chicago Bears | E |
| 1938 | 5 | 33 | Ed Merlin | Brooklyn Dodgers | G |
| 1938 | 11 | 92 | Carl Hinkle | Philadelphia Eagles | C |
| 1940 | 16 | 149 | Ray Andrus | Green Bay Packers | B |
| 1941 | 20 | 190 | Ed Hiestand | Washington Redskins | E |
| 1942 | 14 | 130 | Henry Gude | Chicago Bears | C |
| 1943 | 1 | 10 | Jack Jenkins | Washington Redskins | B |
| 1944 | 12 | 117 | J.P. Moore | Chicago Bears | B |
| 1945 | 6 | 51 | John North | Washington Redskins | E |
| 1945 | 31 | 320 | Bob Cummings | Washington Redskins | C |
| 1947 | 4 | 24 | Charley Hoover | Detroit Lions | C |
| 1947 | 8 | 61 | Alf Satterfield | Philadelphia Eagles | T |
| 1947 | 21 | 189 | Fred Hamilton | Pittsburgh Steelers | T |
| 1947 | 23 | 209 | Binks Bushmaier | Pittsburgh Steelers | B |
| 1949 | 10 | 99 | Lee Malley | Chicago Bears | B |
| 1949 | 15 | 143 | Ken Cooper | Green Bay Packers | G |
| 1949 | 15 | 151 | Carl Copp | Philadelphia Eagles | T |
| 1949 | 17 | 162 | Zealand Thigpen | Detroit Lions | B |
| 1950 | 6 | 67 | Herb Rich | Baltimore Colts | B |
| 1950 | 26 | 332 | Carl Copp | New York Giants | T |
| 1951 | 2 | 24 | Herb Rich | Los Angeles Rams | B |
| 1951 | 2 | 26 | Bucky Curtis | Cleveland Browns | E |
| 1951 | 10 | 115 | Ken Cooper | Chicago Cardinals | G |
| 1952 | 1 | 1 | Bill Wade | Los Angeles Rams | QB |
| 1952 | 24 | 283 | Ted Kirkland | Washington Redskins | E |
| 1952 | 24 | 285 | Bob Werckle | Detroit Lions | T |
| 1953 | 10 | 120 | Mick Lakos | Los Angeles Rams | B |
| 1955 | 8 | 94 | Herman Watson | Philadelphia Eagles | T |
| 1955 | 15 | 172 | Charley Horton | Washington Redskins | B |
| 1955 | 19 | 225 | Terry Fails | Philadelphia Eagles | E |
| 1956 | 1 | 11 | Charley Horton | Los Angeles Rams | B |
| 1956 | 12 | 137 | Tommy Harkins | Philadelphia Eagles | E |
| 1956 | 20 | 230 | Joe Stephenson | Detroit Lions | E |
| 1956 | 26 | 311 | Don Orr | Chicago Bears | B |
| 1956 | 29 | 346 | Billy Krietemeyer | Chicago Bears | B |
| 1956 | 29 | 349 | John Battos | Cleveland Browns | E |
| 1957 | 24 | 287 | Joe Scales | Detroit Lions | B |
| 1957 | 26 | 307 | Bob Swann | Pittsburgh Steelers | T |
| 1958 | 1 | 12 | Phil King | New York Giants | B |
| 1958 | 6 | 69 | Bob Taylor | Baltimore Colts | E |
| 1958 | 24 | 279 | Eric Soesbe | Chicago Cardinals | T |
| 1959 | 3 | 27 | Jimmy Butler | Chicago Cardinals | B |
| 1959 | 6 | 63 | Tom Redmond | Chicago Cardinals | T |
| 1959 | 7 | 77 | Ben Donnell | Detroit Lions | C |
| 1959 | 8 | 90 | Lew Aiken | San Francisco 49ers | E |
| 1959 | 23 | 272 | George Deiderich | Los Angeles Rams | G |
| 1959 | 25 | 295 | Ron Miller | Pittsburgh Steelers | E |
| 1960 | 1 | 5 | Tom Moore | Green Bay Packers | RB |
| 1961 | 15 | 207 | Cody Binkley | New York Giants | C |
| 1963 | 20 | 275 | Steve Shaw | Cleveland Browns | B |
| 1965 | 15 | 202 | Ben Baldwin | Washington Redskins | B |
| 1965 | 17 | 230 | Gary Hart | Washington Redskins | E |
| 1966 | 5 | 70 | Dick Lemay | Washington Redskins | T |
| 1968 | 6 | 144 | Bob Goodridge | Minnesota Vikings | WR |
| 1969 | 3 | 71 | Chip Healy | St. Louis Cardinals | LB |
| 1970 | 2 | 27 | Bob Asher | Dallas Cowboys | T |
| 1970 | 6 | 153 | Pat Toomay | Dallas Cowboys | DE |
| 1971 | 8 | 192 | Karl Weiss | Chicago Bears | T |
| 1973 | 7 | 172 | Rod Freeman | New York Giants | TE |
| 1973 | 10 | 245 | Ken Stone | Washington Redskins | DB |
| 1973 | 15 | 387 | Dave Leffers | Oakland Raiders | C |
| 1974 | 5 | 118 | Mark Ilgenfritz | Cleveland Browns | DE |
| 1974 | 5 | 129 | Doug Nettles | Baltimore Colts | DB |
| 1975 | 14 | 346 | Gene Moshier | Kansas City Chiefs | G |
| 1976 | 7 | 194 | Jay Chesley | San Francisco 49ers | DB |
| 1976 | 7 | 209 | Barry Burton | Pittsburgh Steelers | TE |
| 1976 | 17 | 471 | Steve Curnutte | New York Giants | DB |
| 1978 | 4 | 92 | Dennis Harrison | Philadelphia Eagles | DT |
| 1979 | 10 | 270 | Martin Cox | New England Patriots | WR |
| 1979 | 12 | 322 | Ed Smith | Pittsburgh Steelers | LB |
| 1980 | 6 | 160 | Preston Brown | New England Patriots | WR |
| 1980 | 9 | 233 | Frank Mordica | New Orleans Saints | RB |
| 1980 | 12 | 308 | Mike Wright | Cincinnati Bengals | QB |
| 1982 | 6 | 143 | Ken Hammond | Dallas Cowboys | G |
| 1982 | 8 | 204 | Van Heflin | Cleveland Browns | TE |
| 1983 | 5 | 119 | Jim Arnold | Kansas City Chiefs | P |
| 1983 | 12 | 322 | Allama Matthews | Atlanta Falcons | TE |
| 1984 | 1 | 8 | Leonard Coleman | Indianapolis Colts | DB |
| 1984u | 3 | 69 | Steve Bearden | New Orleans Saints | LB |
| 1985 | 2 | 50 | Chuck Scott | Los Angeles Rams | WR |
| 1985 | 8 | 212 | Rob Monaco | St. Louis Cardinals | G |
| 1985 | 11 | 298 | Ricky Anderson | St. Louis Cardinals | K |
| 1985 | 12 | 324 | Karl Jordan | Dallas Cowboys | LB |
| 1986 | 1 | 20 | Will Wolford | Buffalo Bills | T |
| 1986 | 8 | 203 | Jim Popp | San Francisco 49ers | TE |
| 1986 | 12 | 309 | Steve Wade | Indianapolis Colts | DT |
| 1988 | 5 | 120 | Chris Gaines | Phoenix Cardinals | LB |
| 1988 | 12 | 307 | Carl Parker | Cincinnati Bengals | WR |
| 1990 | 4 | 98 | DeMond Winston | New Orleans Saints | LB |
| 1990 | 12 | 312 | John Gromos | Seattle Seahawks | QB |
| 1992 | 3 | 77 | Corey Harris | Houston Oilers | WR |
| 1996 | 2 | 45 | James Manley | Minnesota Vikings | DT |
| 1998 | 2 | 33 | Corey Chavous | Arizona Cardinals | DB |
| 1998 | 3 | 84 | Jamie Duncan | Tampa Bay Buccaneers | LB |
| 1998 | 5 | 135 | Antony Jordan | Indianapolis Colts | LB |
| 1999 | 2 | 47 | Fred Vinson | Green Bay Packers | DB |
| 2001 | 2 | 47 | Jamie Winborn | San Francisco 49ers | LB |
| 2001 | 4 | 102 | Matt Stewart | Atlanta Falcons | LB |
| 2001 | 5 | 160 | John Markham | New York Giants | K |
| 2001 | 6 | 196 | Jimmy Williams | Buffalo Bills | DB |
| 2003 | 5 | 166 | Hunter Hillenmeyer | Green Bay Packers | LB |
| 2005 | 6 | 189 | Jovan Haye | Carolina Panthers | DE |
| 2005 | 6 | 197 | Justin Geisinger | Buffalo Bills | G |
| 2006 | 1 | 11 | Jay Cutler | Denver Broncos | QB |
| 2008 | 1 | 14 | Chris Williams | Chicago Bears | T |
| 2008 | 3 | 70 | Earl Bennett | Chicago Bears | WR |
| 2008 | 5 | 165 | Jonathan Goff | New York Giants | LB |
| 2009 | 4 | 119 | D. J. Moore | Chicago Bears | DB |
| 2010 | 3 | 67 | Myron Lewis | Tampa Bay Buccaneers | DB |
| 2010 | 7 | 208 | Thomas Welch | New England Patriots | T |
| 2012 | 2 | 62 | Casey Hayward | Green Bay Packers | DB |
| 2012 | 7 | 214 | Tim Fugger | Indianapolis Colts | DE |
| 2013 | 5 | 160 | Zac Stacy | St. Louis Rams | RB |
| 2013 | 7 | 220 | Ryan Seymour | Seattle Seahawks | G |
| 2014 | 2 | 42 | Jordan Matthews | Philadelphia Eagles | WR |
| 2014 | 5 | 173 | Wesley Johnson | Pittsburgh Steelers | T |
| 2014 | 7 | 216 | Andre Hal | Houston Texans | DB |
| 2016 | 7 | 227 | Stephen Weatherly | Minnesota Vikings | LB |
| 2017 | 2 | 57 | Zach Cunningham | Houston Texans | LB |
| 2017 | 5 | 157 | Will Holden | Arizona Cardinals | T |
| 2018 | 3 | 88 | Oren Burks | Green Bay Packers | LB |
| 2019 | 2 | 45 | Joejuan Williams | New England Patriots | DB |
| 2019 | 6 | 183 | Justin Skule | San Francisco 49ers | T |
| 2020 | 3 | 76 | Ke'Shawn Vaughn | Tampa Bay Buccaneers | RB |
| 2021 | 2 | 54 | Dayo Odeyingbo | Indianapolis Colts | DE |
| 2025 | 7 | 251 | Julian Ashby | New England Patriots | LS |
| 2026 | 2 | 54 | Eli Stowers | Philadelphia Eagles | TE |

== See also ==
- List of Vanderbilt University people
