= Kyle Shurmur =

American football player (born 1996)

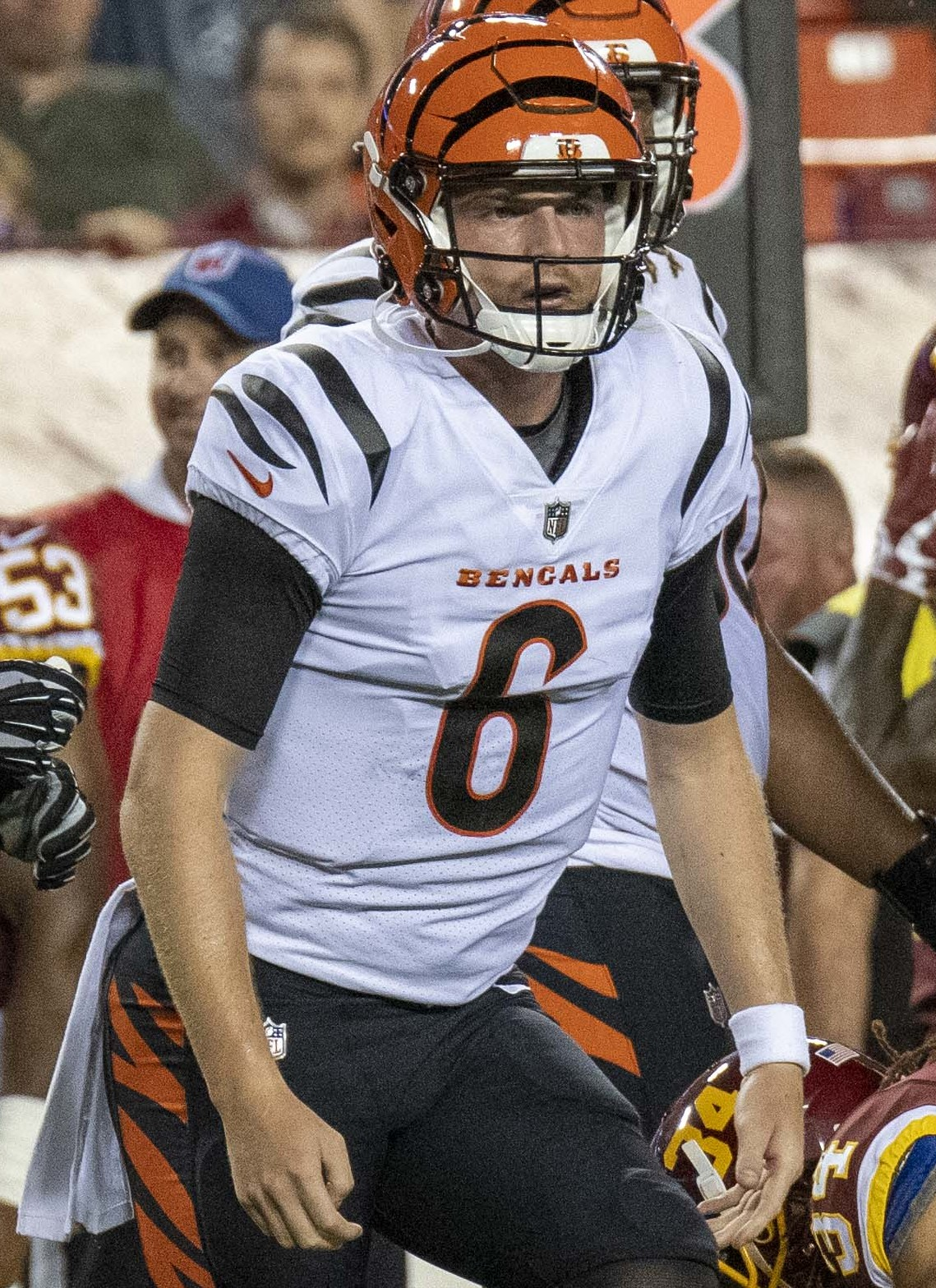
- Shurmur with the Cincinnati Bengals in 2021

Buffalo Bills
- Title: Assistant quarterbacks coach

Personal information
- Born: November 6, 1996 (age 30); East Lansing, Michigan, U.S.
- Listed height: 6 ft 4 in (1.93 m)
- Listed weight: 225 lb (102 kg)

Career information
- Position: Quarterback
- High school: La Salle College (Wyndmoor, Pennsylvania)
- College: Vanderbilt (2015–2018)
- NFL draft: 2019: undrafted

Career history

Playing
- Kansas City Chiefs (2019); Cincinnati Bengals (2020–2021)*; Washington Football Team (2021)
- * Offseason or practice squad member only

Coaching
- Vanderbilt (2020) Volunteer assistant; Buffalo Bills (2022–present); Defensive quality control coach (2022); Offensive quality control coach (2023–2025); Assistant quarterbacks coach (2026–present)

Awards and highlights
- Super Bowl champion (LIV)
- Stats at Pro Football Reference

Kyle Shurmur (born November 6, 1996) is an American football coach and former quarterback who is the assistant quarterbacks coach for the Buffalo Bills of the National Football League (NFL). He played quarterback in college football at Vanderbilt, and signed with the Kansas City Chiefs as an undrafted free agent in 2019.

== Early life ==
Shurmur began his high school career as the backup quarterback at St. Edward High School in Lakewood, Ohio before transferring to La Salle College High School in Wyndmoor, Pennsylvania after his father, Pat, became the offensive coordinator for the Philadelphia Eagles. Over the next two years, Shurmur passed for 4,996 yards and 53 touchdowns for the Explorers while leading the team to a 16–6 record. As a senior, he completed 180 of 307 passes for 2,472 yards and 25 touchdowns, earning PIAA AAAA First-team All-State honors. Shurmur also swam at La Salle, helping the team win the 2014 PIAA state title and was a member of state record-setting 200-medley relay. Shurmur committed to Vanderbilt after being recruited by Cincinnati, Illinois, Pittsburgh, and Temple.

== College career ==
As a true freshman Shurmur started five of Vanderbilt's final six games, going 2–3 and passing for 503 yards, five touchdowns and three interceptions. He was named the Commodores' starting quarterback going into the 2016 season by head coach Derek Mason. During his junior season, Shurmur set a new single-season school record by passing for 26 touchdowns. As a senior, Shurmur was the first Vanderbilt quarterback to beat rival Tennessee three times since Doc Kuhn. Shurmur also joined Greg Zolman as the second quarterback in Vanderbilt history to have three seasons with at least 2,000 yards passing. Shurmur passed Jay Cutler as Vanderbilt's leader in career touchdown passes after throwing his 60th in the team's 36–29 win over Ole Miss on November 17, 2018. In the 2018 Texas Bowl, his final career start, Shurmur passed Cutler as Vanderbilt's all-time leader in passing yards, completions and attempts. Shurmur was invited to participate in the NFLPA Collegiate Bowl, playing for the American team he went 10 of 19 for 90 yards in a 10–7 win over the National team.

=== Records ===
Vanderbilt University school career records:

- Touchdown passes: 64
- Passing yards: 8,865
- Pass completions: 722
- Pass attempts: 1,264

Single season records:

- Touchdown passes: 26 (2017)
- Total touchdowns: 29 (2017)

=== Statistics ===
Year	Team	Class	GP	Passing									Rushing			
Year	Team	Class	GP	Comp	Att	Pct	Yards	Y/A	AY/A	TD	Int	QBR	Att	Yards	Avg	TD
2015	Vanderbilt	Freshman	6	44	103	42.7	503	4.9	4.5	5	3	93.9	14	-33	-2.4	0
2016	Vanderbilt	Sophomore	13	204	375	54.4	2,409	6.4	5.7	9	10	110.9	50	-129	-2.6	0
2017	Vanderbilt	Junior	12	220	380	57.9	2,823	7.4	7.6	26	10	137.6	34	-84	-2.5	3
2018	Vanderbilt	Senior	13	254	406	62.6	3,130	7.7	8.2	24	6	143.9	39	-80	-2.1	0

== Professional career ==
Pre-draft measurables
Height	Weight	Arm length	Hand span	Wingspan	40-yard dash	10-yard split	20-yard split	20-yard shuttle	Three-cone drill	Vertical jump	Broad jump
6 ft 4 in (1.93 m)	230 lb (104 kg)	32 3/4 in (0.83 m)	8 7/8 in (0.23 m)	6 ft 6 1/2 in (1.99 m)	4.91 s	1.68 s	2.84 s	4.48 s	7.41 s	29.5 in (0.75 m)	8 ft 10 in (2.69 m)
All values from NFL Combine/Pro Day

=== Kansas City Chiefs ===
On April 27, 2019, Shurmur signed with the Kansas City Chiefs as an undrafted free agent. He was waived at the end of training camp as part of final cuts and subsequently re-signed to the Chiefs' practice squad the next day on September 1. Shurmur was signed to the active roster October 22. He was waived by Kansas City on November 2, and was re-signed to the practice squad the following day after clearing waivers. Shurmur remained on the practice squad for the rest of the 2019 season, including during the Chiefs' Super Bowl LIV victory.

Shurmur re-signed with the team on February 4, 2020. Shurmur was released by the Chiefs on April 29.

=== Cincinnati Bengals ===
On December 17, 2020, Shurmur signed with the practice squad of the Cincinnati Bengals. He signed a reserve/future contract with Cincinnati on January 4, 2021. Shurmur was waived by the Bengals on August 31.

=== Washington Football Team ===
Shurmur signed with the practice squad of the Washington Football Team on September 13, 2021. On the Week 15 game against the Philadelphia Eagles, he was elevated to the active roster as a COVID-19 replacement player to back up Garrett Gilbert with both Taylor Heinicke and Kyle Allen on the COVID-19 reserve list. Shurmur was released by Washington on January 4, 2022.

== Coaching career ==
Shurmur returned to Vanderbilt as volunteer offensive quality control assistant in 2020 before he was signed by the Bengals. He was hired as a defensive quality control assistant by the Buffalo Bills on February 13, 2022. On February 28, 2023, the Buffalo Bills announced that Shurmur had made a change to become the team's offensive quality control coach. Following the 2025 season, Shurmur was retained by new head coach Joe Brady to serve as the team's assistant quarterbacks coach.

== Personal life ==
Shurmur is the son of NFL coach Pat Shurmur.
