= Kalija Lipscomb =

American gridiron football player (born 1997)

Profile
- Position: Wide receiver

Personal information
- Born: October 6, 1997 (age 29); New Orleans, Louisiana, U.S.
- Listed height: 6 ft 0 in (1.83 m)
- Listed weight: 205 lb (93 kg)

Career information
- High school: Jesuit (New Orleans, Louisiana)
- College: Vanderbilt
- NFL draft: 2020: undrafted

Career history
- Kansas City Chiefs (2020)*; Green Bay Packers (2020)*; Tennessee Titans (2021)*; Saskatchewan Roughriders (2023)*
- * Offseason or practice squad member only
- Stats at Pro Football Reference

Kalija Lipscomb (born October 6, 1997) is an American former football wide receiver. He played college football at Vanderbilt.

== Early life ==
Lipscomb played high school football at Jesuit High School in New Orleans, Louisiana. Lipscomb was a three-star prospect coming out of high school. On February 3, 2016, Lipscomb committed to Vanderbilt, turning down offers from Louisiana Tech, Nebraska, and Northwestern.

== College career ==
Lipscomb entered his senior season on the Biletnikoff Award watchlist. Lipscomb participated in the 2020 Senior Bowl, catchings two passes for twenty-one yards.

=== College career statistics ===
			Receiving			
Year	School	GP	Rec	Yds	Avg	TD
2016	Vanderbilt	11	27	319	11.8	2
2017	Vanderbilt	12	37	610	16.5	8
2018	Vanderbilt	13	87	916	10.5	9
2019	Vanderbilt	10	47	511	10.9	3
Career		46	198	2356	11.9	22

== Professional career ==
Pre-draft measurables
Height	Weight	Arm length	Hand span	Wingspan	40-yard dash	10-yard split	20-yard split	Vertical jump	Broad jump	Bench press
5 ft 11 7/8 in (1.83 m)	207 lb (94 kg)	32 7/8 in (0.84 m)	9 3/8 in (0.24 m)	6 ft 7 in (2.01 m)	4.57 s	1.53 s	2.68 s	32.0 in (0.81 m)	10 ft 7 in (3.23 m)	16 reps
All values from NFL Combine

Lipscomb signed with the Kansas City Chiefs as an undrafted free agent on April 26, 2020. He was waived on September 5, 2020. He was signed to the practice squad the following day. He was released on September 29, 2020.

On October 13, 2020, Lipscomb was signed to the Green Bay Packers practice squad. On October 20, Lipscomb was released by the Packers.

On May 17, 2021, Lipscomb signed with the Tennessee Titans. On August 12, 2021, Lipscomb was waived by the Titans.

On February 14, 2023, Lipscomb signed with the Saskatchewan Roughriders of the Canadian Football League (CFL). He was released on June 1, 2024.
