= 2019 Vanderbilt Commodores football team =

American college football season

2019 Vanderbilt Commodores football
- Conference: Southeastern Conference
- Eastern Division
- Record: 3–9 (1–7 SEC)
- Head coach: Derek Mason (6th season)
- Offensive coordinator: Gerry Gdowski (1st season)
- Offensive scheme: Pro-style
- Defensive coordinator: Jason Tarver (2nd season)
- Base defense: 3–4
- Home stadium: Vanderbilt Stadium

Uniform
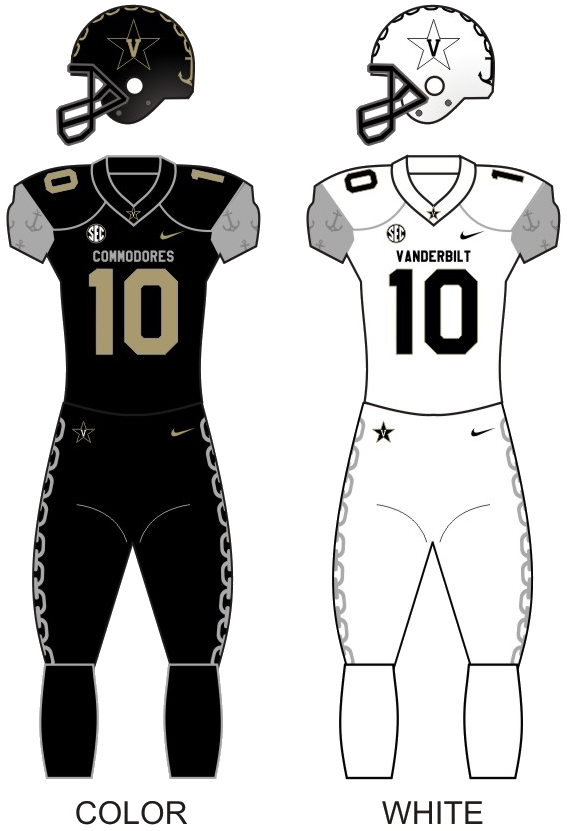

2019 Southeastern Conference football standings
	Conf.			Overall
Team	W		L	W		L
Eastern Division
No. 4 Georgia x	7	–	1	12	–	2
No. 6 Florida	6	–	2	11	–	2
Tennessee *	5	–	3	8	–	5
Kentucky	3	–	5	8	–	5
Missouri *	3	–	5	6	–	6
South Carolina	3	–	5	4	–	8
Vanderbilt	1	–	7	3	–	9
Western Division
No. 1 LSU x$#^	8	–	0	15	–	0
No. 8 Alabama	6	–	2	11	–	2
No. 14 Auburn	5	–	3	9	–	4
Texas A&M	4	–	4	8	–	5
Mississippi State	3	–	5	6	–	7
Ole Miss	2	–	6	4	–	8
Arkansas	0	–	8	2	–	10
Championship: LSU 37, Georgia 10
# – College Football Playoff champion; ^ – College Football Playoff participant; $ – Conference champion; x – Division champion/co-champions; * – Tennessee vacated all wins due to NCAA violations. Missouri was ineligible for postseason due to NCAA sanctions.; Rankings from AP Poll

The 2019 Vanderbilt Commodores football team represented Vanderbilt University in the 2019 NCAA Division I FBS football season. The Commodores played their home games at Vanderbilt Stadium in Nashville, Tennessee, and competed in the Eastern Division of the Southeastern Conference (SEC). They were led by sixth-year head coach Derek Mason.

== Recruiting ==
=== Position key ===
Back	B	Center	C	Cornerback	CB	Defensive back	DB
Defensive end	DE	Defensive lineman	DL	Defensive tackle	DT	End	E
Fullback	FB	Guard	G	Halfback	HB	Kicker	K
Kickoff returner	KR	Offensive tackle	OT	Offensive lineman	OL	Linebacker	LB
Long snapper	LS	Punter	P	Punt returner	PR	Quarterback	QB
Running back	RB	Safety	S	Tight end	TE	Wide receiver	WR

=== Recruits ===
College recruiting information (2019)
Name	Hometown	School	Height	Weight	Commit date
Anfernee Orji; S	Rockwall, TX	Rockwall	6 ft 1 in (1.85 m)	200 lb (91 kg)	Jul 3, 2018
Anfernee Orji; S	Recruit ratings: Scout: Rivals: 247Sports: ESPN:				
Dontye Carriere-Williams; CB	Miami, FL	Independence C.C.	5 ft 11 in (1.80 m)	185 lb (84 kg)	Dec 18, 2018
Dontye Carriere-Williams; CB	Recruit ratings: Scout: Rivals: 247Sports: ESPN:				
Daevion Davis; DT	Madison, AL	James Clemens	6 ft 1 in (1.85 m)	315 lb (143 kg)	Jun 27, 2018
Daevion Davis; DT	Recruit ratings: Scout: Rivals: 247Sports: ESPN:				
Devin Boddie; ATH	Memphis, TN	Whitehaven	5 ft 11 in (1.80 m)	165 lb (75 kg)	Jun 27, 2018
Devin Boddie; ATH	Recruit ratings: Scout: Rivals: 247Sports: ESPN:				
Jayden Harrison; WR	Nashville, TN	Pearl Cohn	5 ft 10 in (1.78 m)	187 lb (85 kg)	Jun 30, 2018
Jayden Harrison; WR	Recruit ratings: Scout: Rivals: 247Sports: ESPN:				
Keyon Brooks; RB	Acworth, GA	Kennesaw Mountain	6 ft 1 in (1.85 m)	195 lb (88 kg)	Dec 19, 2018
Keyon Brooks; RB	Recruit ratings: Scout: Rivals: 247Sports: ESPN:				
Brayden Bapst; OT	Washington, DC	St. John's College HS	6 ft 8 in (2.03 m)	246 lb (112 kg)	Nov 6, 2018
Brayden Bapst; OT	Recruit ratings: Scout: Rivals: 247Sports: ESPN:				
Christian James; DE	Memphis, TN	Christian Brothers	6 ft 4 in (1.93 m)	245 lb (111 kg)	Jun 18, 2018
Christian James; DE	Recruit ratings: Scout: Rivals: 247Sports: ESPN:				
Justin Harris; S	Attalla, AL	Etowah	6 ft 2 in (1.88 m)	175 lb (79 kg)	Jun 24, 2018
Justin Harris; S	Recruit ratings: Scout: Rivals: 247Sports: ESPN:				
Joel DeCoursey; TE	Zionsville, IN	Zionsville	6 ft 5 in (1.96 m)	220 lb (100 kg)	Feb 28, 2018
Joel DeCoursey; TE	Recruit ratings: Scout: Rivals: 247Sports: ESPN:				
Jamil Muhammad; ATH	Madison, AL	James Clemens	6 ft 1 in (1.85 m)	217 lb (98 kg)	Jun 21, 2018
Jamil Muhammad; ATH	Recruit ratings: Scout: Rivals: 247Sports: ESPN:				
Donald Fitzgerald; OT	Nashville, TN	Hillsboro	6 ft 8 in (2.03 m)	280 lb (130 kg)	Dec 10, 2018
Donald Fitzgerald; OT	Recruit ratings: Scout: Rivals: 247Sports: ESPN:				
Jaylen Mahoney; CB	Rock Hill, SC	South Pointe	5 ft 11 in (1.80 m)	180 lb (82 kg)	Sep 3, 2018
Jaylen Mahoney; CB	Recruit ratings: Scout: Rivals: 247Sports: ESPN:				
Julian Hernandez; OG	Fort Lauderdale, FL	St. Thomas Aquinas	6 ft 2.5 in (1.89 m)	294 lb (133 kg)	Sep 5, 2018
Julian Hernandez; OG	Recruit ratings: Scout: Rivals: 247Sports: ESPN:				
JR Tran-Reno; ATH	Birmingham, AL	Briarwood Christian	6 ft 1 in (1.85 m)	205 lb (93 kg)	Jun 26, 2018
JR Tran-Reno; ATH	Recruit ratings: Scout: Rivals: 247Sports: ESPN:				
Justin Ball; TE	Washington, DC	Gonzaga	6 ft 6 in (1.98 m)	230 lb (100 kg)	Jun 23, 2018
Justin Ball; TE	Recruit ratings: Scout: Rivals: 247Sports: ESPN:				
Gabriel Jeudy; CB	Charlotte, NC	Ardrey Kell	6 ft 1 in (1.85 m)	172 lb (78 kg)	Sep 9, 2018
Gabriel Jeudy; CB	Recruit ratings: Scout: Rivals: 247Sports: ESPN:				
Brandon Maddox; DT	North Augusta, SC	Pima C.C.	6 ft 4 in (1.93 m)	270 lb (120 kg)	Dec 15, 2018
Brandon Maddox; DT	Recruit ratings: Scout: Rivals: 247Sports: ESPN:				
Nate Clifton; OT	Brentwood, TN	Brentwood Academy	6 ft 5 in (1.96 m)	250 lb (110 kg)	Dec 17, 2018
Nate Clifton; OT	Recruit ratings: Scout: Rivals: 247Sports: ESPN:				
Jared Wheatley; P	Indian Trail, NC	Porter Ridge	6 ft 2 in (1.88 m)	195 lb (88 kg)	Nov 4, 2018
Jared Wheatley; P	Recruit ratings: Scout: Rivals: 247Sports: ESPN:				
Overall recruit ranking:
Note: In many cases, Scout, Rivals, 247Sports, On3, and ESPN may conflict in their listings of height and weight.; In these cases, the average was taken. ESPN grades are on a 100-point scale.; Sources: "2019 Team Ranking". Rivals.com.

== Preseason ==
=== SEC media poll ===
The 2019 SEC Media Days were held July 15–18 in Birmingham, Alabama. In the preseason media poll, Vanderbilt was projected to finish in last in the East Division.

=== Preseason All-SEC teams ===
The Commodores had three players selected to the preseason all-SEC teams.

Offense

2nd team

Ke'Shawn Vaughn – RB

Kalija Lipscomb – WR

Jared Pinkney – TE

== Schedule ==
Date	Time	Opponent	Site	TV	Result	Attendance
August 31	6:30 p.m.	No. 3 Georgia	Vanderbilt Stadium; Nashville, TN (rivalry / SEC Nation)	ESPN	L 6–30	40,350
September 7	11:00 a.m.	at Purdue*	Ross–Ade Stadium; West Lafayette, IN	BTN	L 24–42	50,506
September 21	11:00 a.m.	No. 4 LSU	Vanderbilt Stadium; Nashville, TN	SECN	L 38–66	32,048
September 28	11:00 a.m.	Northern Illinois*	Vanderbilt Stadium; Nashville, TN	SECN	W 24–18	24,519
October 5	6:30 p.m.	at Ole Miss	Vaught–Hemingway Stadium; Oxford, MS (rivalry)	SECN	L 6–31	47,601
October 12	3:00 p.m.	UNLV*	Vanderbilt Stadium; Nashville, TN	SECN	L 10–34	20,048
October 19	3:00 p.m.	No. 22 Missouri^{†}	Vanderbilt Stadium; Nashville, TN	SECN	W 21–14	23,900
November 2	6:30 p.m.	at South Carolina	Williams–Brice Stadium; Columbia, SC	SECN	L 7–24	71,945
November 9	11:00 a.m.	at No. 10 Florida	Ben Hill Griffin Stadium; Gainesville, FL	ESPN	L 0–56	86,201
November 16	2:30 p.m.	Kentucky	Vanderbilt Stadium; Nashville, TN (rivalry)	SECN	L 14–38	23,288
November 23	2:30 p.m.	East Tennessee State*	Vanderbilt Stadium; Nashville, TN	SECN Alt.	W 38–0	19,863
November 30	3:00 p.m.	at Tennessee	Neyland Stadium; Knoxville, TN (rivalry)	SECN	L 10–28	87,367
*Non-conference game; ^{†}Homecoming; Rankings from AP Poll released prior to the game; All times are in Central time

Schedule source:

== Rankings ==
Ranking movements Legend: — = Not ranked
	Week																
Poll	Pre	1	2	3	4	5	6	7	8	9	10	11	12	13	14	15	Final
AP	—	—	—	—	—	—	—	—	—	—	—	—	—	—	—	—	—
Coaches	—	—	—	—	—	—	—	—	—	—	—	—	—	—	—	—	—
CFP	Not released										—	—	—	—	—	—	Not released

== Game summaries ==
=== Week 1: vs. #3 Georgia ===
Week 1: #3 Georgia Bulldogs at Vanderbilt Commodores

Quarter	1	2	3	4	Total
#3 Georgia	14	7	3	6	30
Vanderbilt	0	6	0	0	6

at Vanderbilt Stadium, Nashville, Tennessee

- Date: August 31, 2019
- Game time: 7:30 pm
- Game attendance: 40,350
- TV announcers (ESPN): Tom Hart, Jordan Rodgers and Cole Cubelic
- Recap, Box Score

Game information

First quarter

- UGA – Demetris Robinson 3-yard pass from Jake Fromm (Rodrigo Blankenship kick), 11:01. #3 Georgia 7–0. Drive: 8 plays, 75 yards, 3:59.
- UGA – James Cook 18-yard run (Rodrigo Blankenship kick), 0:56. #3 Georgia 14–0. Drive: 10 plays, 89 yards, 5:34.

Second quarter

- UGA – Brian Herrien 1-yard run (Rodrigo Blankenship kick), 8:01. #3 Georgia 21–0. Drive: 7 plays, 80 yards, 4:03.
- VAN – Ryley Guay 26-yard field goal, 2:25. #3 Georgia 21–3. Drive: 12 plays, 73 yards, 5:36.
- VAN – Ryley Guay 46-yard field goal, 0:04. #3 Georgia 21–6. Drive: 7 plays, 52 yards, 1:06.

Third quarter

- UGA – Rodrigo Blankenship 50-yard field goal, 7:48. #3 Georgia 24–6. Drive: 8 plays, 56 yards, 5:23.

Fourth quarter

- UGA – Rodrigo Blankenship 37-yard field goal, 7:20. #3 Georgia 27–6. Drive: 5 plays, 20 yards, 2:21.
- UGA – Rodrigo Blankenship 31-yard field goal, 2:13. #3 Georgia 30–6. Drive: 8 plays, 31 yards, 3:23.

Top passers

- UGA – Jake Fromm – 15/23, 156 yards, TD
- VAN – Riley Neal – 14/25, 85 yards

Top rushers

- UGA – D'Andre Swift – 16 rushes, 147 yards
- VAN – Ke'Shawn Vaughn – 15 rushes, 74 yards

Top receivers

- UGA – Lawrence Cager – 2 receptions, 41 yards
- VAN – Ke'Shawn Vaughn – 3 receptions, 24 yards

=== At Purdue ===
	1	2	3	4	Total
Commodores	7	3	0	14	24
Boilermakers	7	7	14	14	42

=== LSU ===
	1	2	3	4	Total
No. 4 Tigers	28	10	21	7	66
Commodores	7	10	14	7	38

=== Northern Illinois ===
	1	2	3	4	Total
Huskies	0	0	10	8	18
Commodores	14	0	7	3	24

=== At Ole Miss ===
	1	2	3	4	Total
Commodores	0	6	0	0	6
Rebels	10	0	14	7	31

=== UNLV ===
	1	2	3	4	Total
Rebels	7	17	0	10	34
Commodores	7	3	0	0	10

=== Missouri ===
	1	2	3	4	Total
No. 22 Tigers	0	7	7	0	14
Commodores	0	14	0	7	21

=== At South Carolina ===
	1	2	3	4	Total
Commodores	7	0	0	0	7
Gamecocks	0	14	0	10	24

=== At Florida ===
	1	2	3	4	Total
Commodores	0	0	0	0	0
No. 10 Gators	0	14	28	14	56

=== Kentucky ===
	1	2	3	4	Total
Wildcats	3	21	14	0	38
Commodores	14	0	0	0	14

=== East Tennessee State ===
	1	2	3	4	Total
Buccaneers	0	0	0	0	0
Commodores	7	7	17	7	38

=== At Tennessee ===
	1	2	3	4	Total
Commodores	3	0	0	7	10
Volunteers	7	14	0	7	28

== Players drafted into the NFL ==
Round	Pick	Player	Position	NFL Club
3	76	Ke'Shawn Vaughn	RB	Tampa Bay Buccaneers
