= Zac Stacy =

American football player (born 1991)

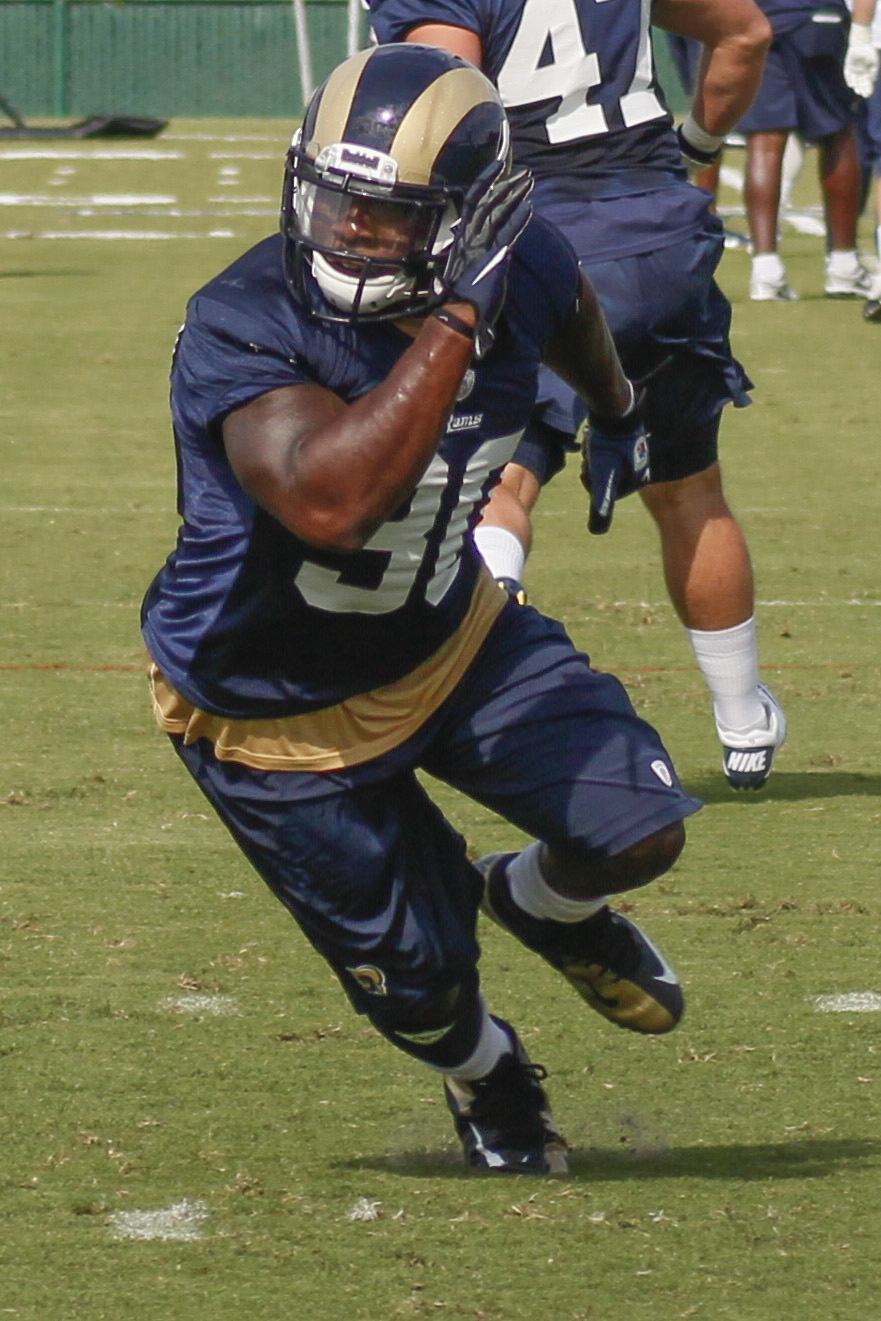
- Stacy with the St. Louis Rams in 2013

No. 30, 20
- Position: Running back

Personal information
- Born: April 9, 1991 (age 35); Centreville, Alabama, U.S.
- Listed height: 5 ft 9 in (1.75 m)
- Listed weight: 224 lb (102 kg)

Career information
- High school: Bibb County (Centreville)
- College: Vanderbilt
- NFL draft: 2013: 5th round, 160th overall pick

Career history
- St. Louis Rams (2013–2014); New York Jets (2015); Saskatchewan Roughriders (2018)*; Memphis Express (2019)
- * Offseason or practice squad member only

Awards and highlights
- 2× Second-team All-SEC (2011, 2012)

Career NFL statistics
- Rushing yards: 1,355
- Rushing average: 3.8
- Rushing touchdowns: 9
- Receptions: 53
- Receiving yards: 358
- Receiving touchdowns: 1
- Stats at Pro Football Reference

Zachary Latrell Stacy (born April 9, 1991) is an American former professional football player who was a running back in the National Football League (NFL). He played college football for the Vanderbilt Commodores and was selected by the St. Louis Rams in the fifth round of the 2013 NFL draft. He was also a member of the New York Jets, Saskatchewan Roughriders, and Memphis Express.

== Early life ==
Stacy was an under-the-radar type of player in which a few schools had shown interest. Officially, two schools offered a scholarship to him: Vanderbilt and UAB, and he received some interest from Alabama, Auburn, Kentucky, and Ole Miss.

Stacy was a four-year starter at Bibb County High School. As a junior, he rushed for 1,668 yards and 26 touchdowns, and caught 27 passes for 228 yards while playing quarterback, running back, and wide receiver. Stacy received First Team 4A All-State honors, the Division 4A Player of the Year award, and was an Honorable Mention ASWA All-State. As a senior, he rushed for 2,407 yards on 247 carries, good for an average of 9.7 yards per carry. He scored 36 touchdowns, helping Bibb County to 10–2 mark and a trip to the second round of 4A state playoffs. He scored seven touchdowns against Jemison High School and was finalist for Alabama's 4A Mr. Football honor. He also named to the ASWA 4A All-State First Team, the Birmingham News All-State Second Team, and The Tuscaloosa News Super 11. Perhaps the biggest honor Stacy received was being named Division 4A Player of the Year. A two-time West Alabama Player of the Year, Stacy ended his prep career with 5,863 rushing yards and 76 total touchdowns.

== College career ==
At Vanderbilt, Stacy made his first career start in 2009 as a true freshman against Western Carolina due to an injury to starting tailback Jared Hawkins, who was sidelined with a bad foot. Stacy teamed with Warren Norman, with the pair combining for 240 yards on the ground. It was the first time in school history that two freshmen had rushed for over 100 yards in the same game. Stacy's total of 135 yards was a school record for a freshman. Norman, alternating series with Stacy, also went over the century mark with 105. Stacy played in 10 of the 12 games in 2009, starting 4 games. He missed the games against Ole Miss and South Carolina with a lingering ankle injury that also limited his production against Mississippi State and Rice. He finished the season as the team's second-leading rusher behind Norman with 478 yards and three touchdowns on 107 carries.

As a sophomore in 2010, Stacy earned starts against SEC opponents LSU, Georgia and Florida. He was a productive offensive force for the Commodores until his season ended prematurely with a head injury in the first half of the Florida game. This injury caused Stacy to miss the final three games. He once again finished the year as the team's second-leading rusher (331 yards).

In 2011, Stacy earned Vanderbilt's MVOP award (Most Valuable Offensive Player) and set the single-season record for rushing with 1,193 yards, breaking a mark set by Corey Harris in 1991. He also broke the record for rushing TDs with 14. Stacy ended the year as the 3rd-leading rusher in the SEC, earning 2nd team All-SEC honors. In 2011, he was the 4th person all-time for a Vanderbilt player to rush for over 1,000 yards (1072), and first since 1995 (Jermaine Johnson). Stacy had the most rushing attempts (201) since 1995 (Jermaine Johnson) (267) moved up to 8th on all-time Vanderbilt rushing yards in a career (2,002), and averaged 91.8 rushing yards per-game (YPG) and 117 YPG at home. He tied with Allama Matthews TE, 1982 with most TDs totals by a single player with 14. He ranked 2nd all time with 84 points, tied with Matthews behind Jack Jenkins (90) points in 1941, and rushed for 3 TDs 3 times vs. Army, Kentucky and at Wake Forest Had his second 100-yard game against Ole Miss. He completed first pass of his career, passing to Jordan Matthews for a 43-yard TD pass, and had 198 rushing yards against Army, 128 yards against Arkansas Season-high 28 carries against Kentucky and again at Wake Forest. Stacy was named the SEC Offensive Player of the Week for 135-yard, three-score performance against the Wildcats on Senior Day. He ran for 184 yards at Wake Forest to break team single-season record, and scored in seven of team's final eight games.

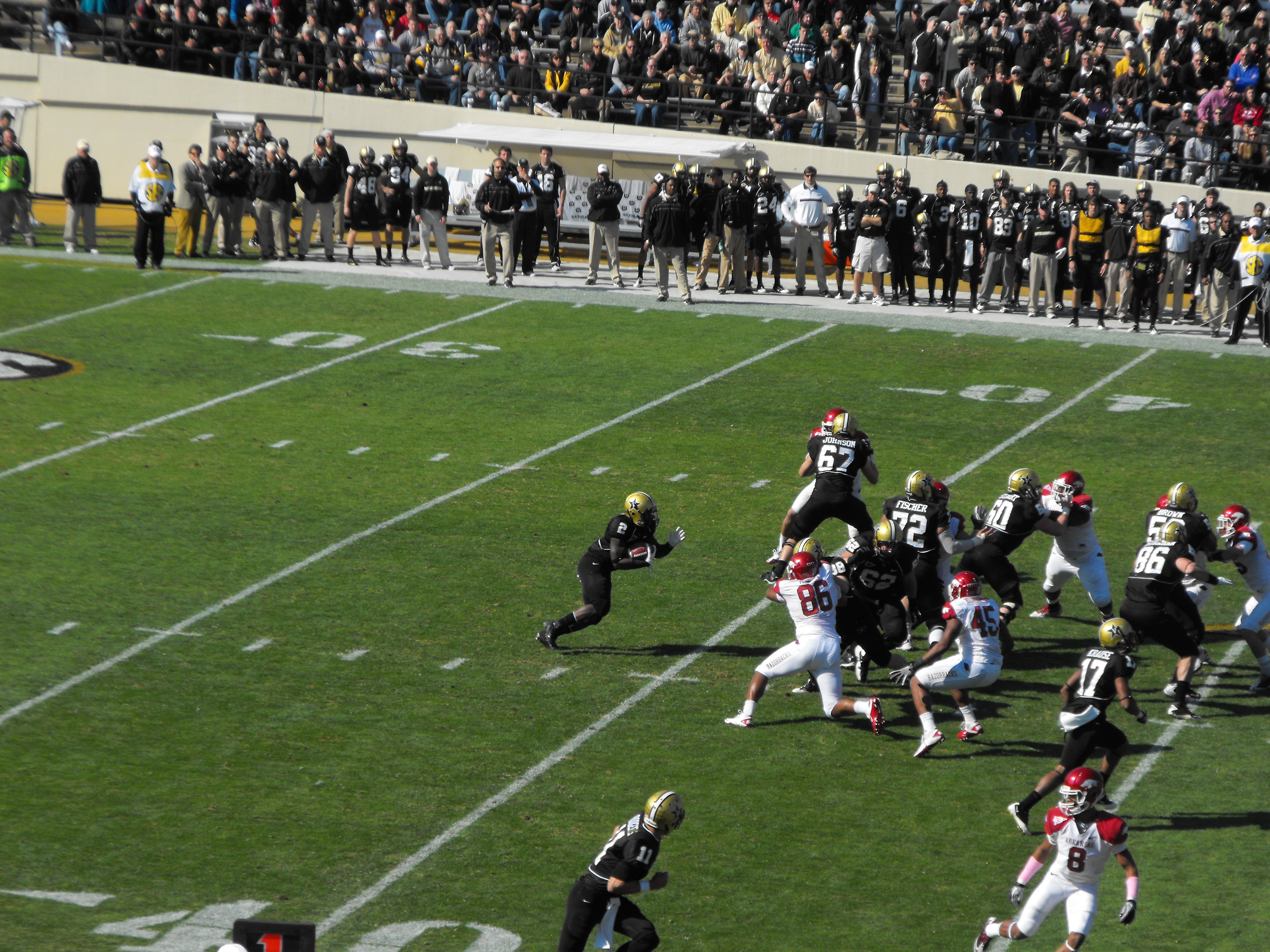
Stacy carrying the ball in a game against the Arkansas Razorbacks in 2011

Stacy finished the 2012 season with 1,034 rushing yards on 182 attempts; against Presbyterian achieved 8 att for 174 yds, against Auburn 27 att for 169 yds, and against Wake Forest 21 att for 180 yds. Following the season, Stacy was voted second team All-SEC. He became the first Vanderbilt player and the eighth SEC player to rush for 1,000 yards in back to back seasons, and the first Commodore to surpass 3,000 yards rushing, as he racked up 3,143 yards on the ground for his career. He was just the 30th player in FBS history to do so. Stacy also set the record for the longest rush (90 yards) by a Vanderbilt player. He also graduated with a degree in Special Education.

Honors

- 2012 Second Team All-SEC (AP), Maxwell Award Watch List, Doak Walker Award watch list.
- 2011 Second Team All-SEC (Coaches), Second Team All-SEC (AP) SEC Academic Honor Roll, MVP FAM Music City Bowl.

== Professional career ==
=== Pre-draft ===
Pre-draft measurables
Height	Weight	Arm length	Hand span	40-yard dash	10-yard split	20-yard split	20-yard shuttle	Three-cone drill	Vertical jump	Broad jump	Bench press
5 ft 8 3/8 in (1.74 m)	216 lb (98 kg)	30 1/4 in (0.77 m)	8 5/8 in (0.22 m)	4.55 s	1.57 s	2.68 s	4.17 s	6.70 s	33 in (0.84 m)	10 ft 2 in (3.10 m)	27 reps
All values from NFL Combine

Stacy was considered a talented back prior to the 2013 NFL draft and had a strong showing at the 2013 NFL Combine.

=== St. Louis Rams ===
Stacy was selected in the fifth round with the 160th overall pick in the 2013 NFL Draft. In his first NFL game, Stacy had one run for 4 yards and no receiving yards against the Arizona Cardinals. He got his first start on October 6, 2013, against the Jacksonville Jaguars but was forced out of the game in the fourth quarter due to a rib injury. He was the leading running back in the game with 14 carries for 78 yards. In Week 6 against the Houston Texans, Stacy gained 79 rushing yards on 18 carries.

On October 28, 2013, on Monday Night Football, Stacy had arguably the best game of his rookie season against the Seattle Seahawks, getting a season high 134 rushing yards on 26 carries. The following week, Stacy turned in a second 100+ rushing yard game in a 28–21 loss to the Tennessee Titans, with 127 yards on 27 carries and two touchdowns. The two touchdowns were his first career rushing touchdowns and the first rushing touchdowns for the Rams during the season. He also had six catches for a career-high 51 yards.

=== New York Jets ===
Shortly after the Rams selected running back Todd Gurley in the 2015 NFL draft, Stacy requested to be traded. The Rams traded Stacy to the New York Jets in exchange for New York's 2015 seventh round (224th overall) pick on May 2, 2015. On November 12, 2015, Stacy broke his ankle against the Buffalo Bills and was placed on injured reserve the following day.

Stacy was waived by the Jets on July 27, 2016, after failing his physical.

On February 16, 2017, Stacy announced his retirement from the NFL. The early retirement was due to injuries and also to take care of his brother, who has Down syndrome.

=== Saskatchewan Roughriders ===
On May 20, 2018, Stacy officially came out of retirement and signed with the Saskatchewan Roughriders of the Canadian Football League. Stacy played in, and was his team's leading rusher in both preseason games; he accumulated 51 yards on 11 carries, in addition to catching 3 passes for 39 yards. Despite this, Stacy lost out to recently signed former teammate Tre Mason, who had only one carry in the only preseason game he appeared in.

=== Memphis Express ===
In January 2019, Stacy signed with the Memphis Express of the newly founded Alliance of American Football for the 2019 season. CBS Sports reported in February 2019, shortly before the 2019 AAF season was set to commence, that Stacy was expected to be among the "names to watch" for the Express in the upcoming season. In the Express' week one 26–0 loss to the Birmingham Iron, Stacy rushed 12 times for 58 yards.

On February 16, 2019, against the Arizona Hotshots, Stacy rushed for 101 yards before he was pulled out of the game, becoming the league's first running back to eclipse the century mark. Stacy was placed on injured reserve on April 1, 2019; the AAF announced shortly thereafter that it was suspending all football operations. In 8 games played, Stacy rushed for 317 yards and 3 touchdowns on 100 carries, and caught 18 passes for 138 yards and another touchdown.

== Career statistics ==
=== NFL ===
Year	Team	GP	Rushing						Receiving				Fumbles	
Year	Team	GP	Att	Yds	Avg	Y/G	Lng	TD	Rec	Yds	Lng	TD	Fum	Lost
2013	STL	14	250	973	3.9	69.5	40	7	26	141	25	1	1	1
2014	STL	13	76	293	3.9	22.5	16	1	18	152	17	0	2	2
2015	NYJ	8	31	89	2.9	11.1	18	1	9	65	16	0	0	0
Career		35	357	1,355	3.8	38.7	40	9	53	358	25	1	3	3

=== College ===
Season	Rushing					Receiving					Totals				
Season	Att	Yds	Avg	Lng	TD	Rec	Yds	Avg	Lng	TD	Tch	Yds	Avg	Lng	TD
2009	107	478	4.5	62	3	7	72	10.3	47	0	110	550	b5.0	62	3
2010	66	331	5.0	67	3	9	32	3.6	9	0	69	363	5.2	67	3
2011	201	1,193	5.9	77	14	20	106	5.3	44	0	215	1,299	6.0	77	14
2012	207	1,141	5.5	90	10	10	205	20.5	72	0	217	1,346	6.2	90	10
Career	581	3,143	5.4	90	30	46	415	9.0	72	0	611	3,558	v5.8	90	30

== Legal issues ==
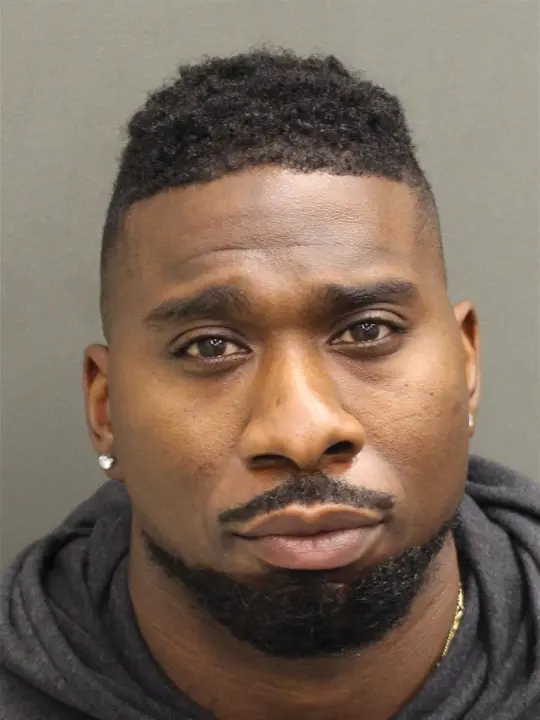
Stacy's 2021 mugshot

On November 18, 2021, multiple news outlets posted a video that depicted Stacy violently assaulting his ex-girlfriend, Kristin Evans, in front of their 5-month-old son. Following the incident, the Orange County Sheriff's Office had tried to apprehend Stacy, but discovered that he had already left the state of Florida. However, he was found in Orlando on November 19 and was subsequently arrested, during which he attempted to persuade the police that his ex-partner had "staged" the assault, claiming that she was "bitter" that their relationship had ended.

Stacy was sent to Orange County jail, where he faced charges of aggravated battery causing great bodily harm and criminal mischief. On February 27, 2023, Stacy was sentenced in an Orange County court to six months in jail and one year of probation after pleading guilty.
