= 2016 Independence Bowl =

2016 Camping World Independence Bowl
- 41st Independence Bowl
| NC State Wolfpack | Vanderbilt Commodores |
| (6–6) | (6–6) |
| ACC | SEC |
| 41 | 17 |
| Head coach: Dave Doeren | Head coach: Derek Mason |
| | 1 | 2 | 3 | 4 | Total |
|---|---|---|---|---|---|
| NC State | 0 | 14 | 14 | 13 | 41 |
| Vanderbilt | 3 | 0 | 7 | 7 | 17 |
- Date: December 26, 2016
- Season: 2016
- Stadium: Independence Stadium
- Location: Shreveport, Louisiana
- Favorite: NC State by 4
- Referee: Mike Cannon (Big Ten)
- Attendance: 28,995
- Payout: US$1,200,000

United States TV coverage
- Network: ESPN2/Sports USA
- Announcers: Mike Couzens, Cole Cubelic, Kevin Weidl (TV); Josh Appel, Doug Plank (Radio)

The 2016 Independence Bowl was a college football bowl game played on December 26, 2016 at Independence Stadium in Shreveport, Louisiana. The 41st annual Independence Bowl featured the NC State Wolfpack of the ACC against the Vanderbilt Commodores of the SEC. Sponsored by Camping World, the game was officially known as the Camping World Independence Bowl.

== Team selection ==
The game featured the NC State Wolfpack against the Vanderbilt Commodores.

This was the third meeting between the schools, with Vanderbilt winning the two previous ones. The most recent meeting was in the 2012 Music City Bowl, where the Commodores defeated the Wolfpack by a score of 38–24.

== Game summary ==
=== Scoring summary ===
Scoring summary

| Quarter | Time | Drive | | | Team | Scoring information | Score | |
| Quarter | Time | Plays | Yards | TOP | Team | Scoring information | NCST | VANDY |
|---|---|---|---|---|---|---|---|---|
| 1 | 6:06 | 8 | 46 | 4:12 | VANDY | 52-yard field goal by Tommy Openshaw | 0 | 3 |
| 2 | 9:08 | 7 | 41 | 3:30 | NCST | Jaylen Samuels 9-yard touchdown reception from Ryan Finley, Connor Haskins kick good | 7 | 3 |
| 2 | 1:24 | 4 | 81 | 0:50 | NCST | Jaylen Samuels 55-yard touchdown reception from Ryan Finley, Connor Haskins kick good | 14 | 3 |
| 3 | 11:50 | 4 | 18 | 1:52 | NCST | Reggie Gallaspy II 5-yard touchdown reception from Ryan Finley, Connor Haskins kick good | 21 | 3 |
| 3 | 5:34 | 9 | 58 | 2:28 | NCST | Jaylen Samuels 17-yard touchdown reception from Ryan Finley, Connor Haskins kick good | 28 | 3 |
| 3 | 0:58 | 11 | 75 | 4:36 | VANDY | Ralph Webb 30-yard touchdown run, Tommy Openshaw kick good | 28 | 10 |
| 4 | 10:37 | 3 | 4 | 1:26 | VANDY | Khari Blasingame 1-yard touchdown run, Tommy Openshaw kick good | 28 | 17 |
| 4 | 10:21 | | | | NCST | Nyheim Hines 100-yd kickoff return for a touchdown, Connor Haskins kick good | 35 | 17 |
| 4 | 0:00 | | | | NCST | Interception returned 30 yards for touchdown by Niles Clark, Connor Haskins kick not needed | 41 | 17 |
| "TOP" = time of possession. For other American football terms, see Glossary of American football. | | | | | | | 41 | 17 |

=== Statistics ===
| Statistics | NCST | VANDY |
|---|---|---|
| First downs | 21 | 18 |
| Third down efficiency | 8–15 | 6–18 |
| Rushes-yards | 36–141 (3.9) | 35–156 (4.5) |
| Passing yards | 235 | 158 |
| Passing, Comp-Att-Int | 19–31–0 | 19–46–3 |
| Time of Possession | 29:48 | 30:12 |
