= Earl Bennett =

American football player (born 1987)

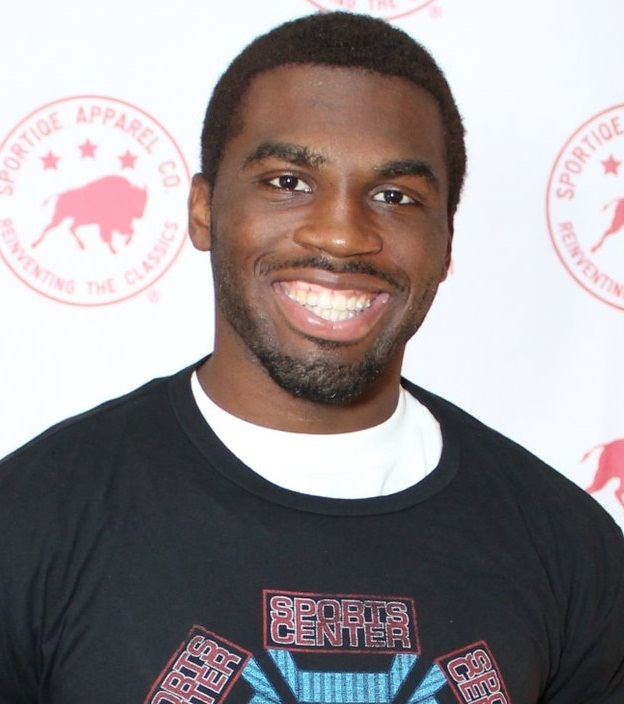
- Bennett in 2011

Vanderbilt Commodores
- Title: Director of player development

Personal information
- Born: March 23, 1987 (age 39); Birmingham, Alabama, U.S.
- Listed height: 5 ft 11 in (1.80 m)
- Listed weight: 209 lb (95 kg)

Career information
- High school: West End (Birmingham)
- College: Vanderbilt (2005–2007)
- NFL draft: 2008: 3rd round, 70th overall pick

Career history

Playing
- Chicago Bears (2008–2013); Cleveland Browns (2014)*
- * Offseason or practice squad member only

Coaching
- Vanderbilt (2021–present) Director of player development

Awards and highlights
- 3× First-team All-SEC (2005, 2006, 2007)

Career NFL statistics
- Receptions: 185
- Receiving yards: 2,277
- Receiving touchdowns: 12
- Return yards: 242
- Return touchdowns: 1
- Stats at Pro Football Reference

Earl Bryan Bennett (born March 23, 1987) is an American former professional football player who was a wide receiver for the Chicago Bears of the National Football League (NFL). He played college football for the Vanderbilt Commodores and was selected by the Bears in the third round of the 2008 NFL draft. After his playing career, he became the director of player development at Vanderbilt.

== College career ==
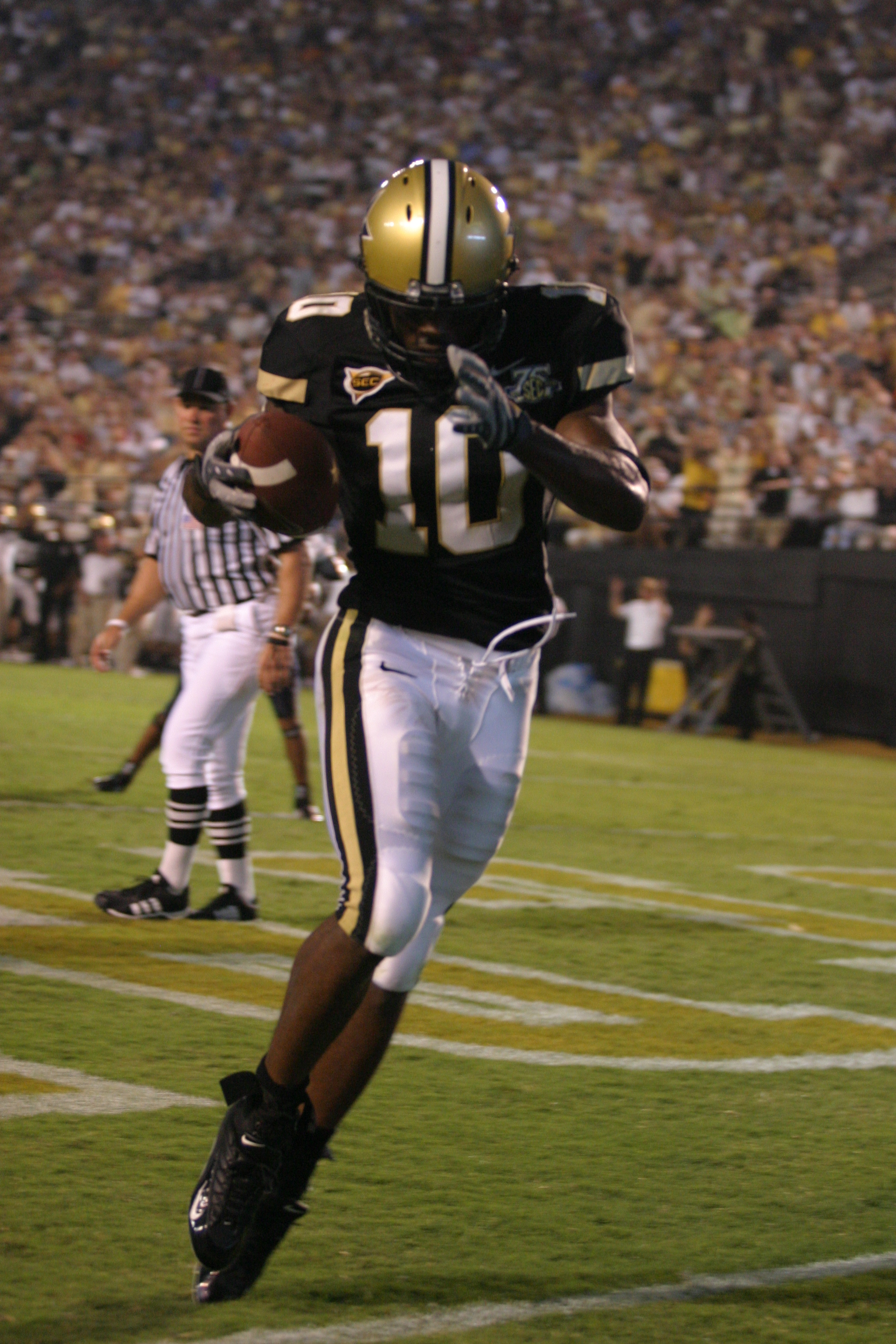
Bennett celebrates a touchdown in college

A three-time All-SEC selection at Vanderbilt, Bennett left school as the all-time SEC leader in receptions with 236. Although later surpassed by Jordan Matthews, Bennett still ranks near the top of Vanderbilt's career receiving leaderboards.

=== Awards and honors ===
- 2005 – First-team All-SEC (Coaches)
- 2005 – Second-team All-SEC (AP)
- 2005 – First-team SEC All Freshman Team
- 2005 – Sporting News Second-team Freshman All American
- 2005 – Scout.com First-team All American
- 2005 – Rivals.com Second-team All American
- 2006 – Rivals.com Third-team All American
- 2006 – First-team All-SEC (AP)
- 2006 – Second-team All-SEC (Coaches)
- 2006 – Rivals.com First-team All-SEC
- 2006 – Scout.com First-team All-SEC

=== Records ===
- He set the Southeastern Conference record for career receptions with 236.
- He has totaled more receptions than any other Southeastern Conference receiver after two years.
- He set the school record with 223 receiving yards against the Richmond Spiders in the Commodores' 2007 opening season win.
- He is the first ever SEC receiver to record 75 receptions in three different seasons.

=== Statistics ===
	Receiving					Rushing				
Year	REC	YDS	AVG	LNG	TD	ATT	YDS	AVG	LNG	TD
2005	79	876	11.1	41	9	5	11	2.2	14	0
2006	82	1146	14.0	77	6	5	11	2.2	11	0
2007	75	830	11.0	54	5	10	22	2.2	15	0
Totals	236	2852	12.1	77	20	20	44	2.2	15	0

== Professional career ==
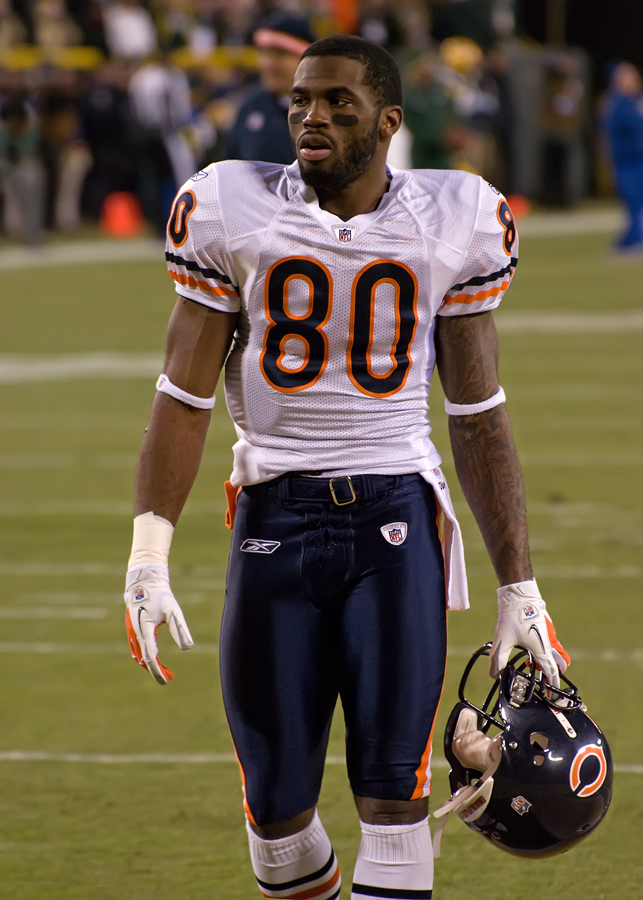
Bennett with the Chicago Bears in 2011

=== Chicago Bears ===
==== 2008 season ====
The Chicago Bears chose Bennett in the third round (70th overall) of the 2008 NFL draft. He didn't catch a single pass his entire rookie year and was mostly on the sidelines.

==== 2009 season ====
On April 2, 2009, Bennett's former teammate at Vanderbilt during the 2005 season, Pro Bowl quarterback Jay Cutler was acquired by the Bears via a trade with the Denver Broncos. Bears head coach Lovie Smith said Bennett would be given "every opportunity" to win a spot as a starting receiver alongside Devin Hester in 2009. Bennett did just that during the course of mandatory mini-camp and training camp, as he showed an ability to make tough grabs in traffic and a willingness to go over the middle. Bennett and Cutler quickly regained the chemistry they shared on and off the field during their college years playing together at Vanderbilt. During that offseason, Bennett also changed his number from 85 to 80. (He tried to obtain his original college number 10, but since NFL rules prohibit players from changing numbers in the 80s to numbers in the 10s, he settled for 80 as it reminded him of Jerry Rice.)

Bennett was the only Bears receiver to catch at least 1 pass in each game played during the 16-Game regular season in which the Bears missed the playoffs. Bennett got off to a strong start in season in the Week 1 match-up against the Green Bay Packers, making seven catches for 66 yards. Two weeks later against the Seattle Seahawks, Bennett caught four passes for 80 yards. A week later against the Detroit Lions, Bennett returned four punts for a 15-yard average and a long of 25 yards in place of an injured Devin Hester. During Week 6 against the Atlanta Falcons, Bennett caught four passes for 57 yards, including a clutch grab in the red zone in which Bennett took a big hit to still give Chicago a chance to win but eventually lost that game. In Week 9 against the Arizona Cardinals, Bennett caught seven passes for 93 yards, but the Bears lost 41–21. In Week 16 against the division rival Minnesota Vikings, Bennett caught three passes for 35 yards, along with his second career receiving touchdown.

Bennett had a key two-point conversion against the Seattle Seahawks for his first points of the 2009 season and his career. Bennett caught his first career touchdown from Jay Cutler against the St. Louis Rams in Week 13 as well completing a career-long 71-yard pass reception.

On December 20 against the Baltimore Ravens, Bennett returned a punt 49 yards for a touchdown in place of the Bears injured returner Devin Hester.

Bennett finished the season with 717 yards on 54 catches with two receiving touchdowns and a punt return touchdown as well.

==== 2010 season ====
During Week 6 against the Seahawks, Bennett laid a devastating block on Seattle punter Jon Ryan, allowing teammate Devin Hester to return his second punt of the season for a touchdown. Bennett caught his third career receiving touchdown in Week 9 against the Buffalo Bills in Toronto.

During the NFC Championship game, with Chicago trailing 21–7, Caleb Hanie, who was playing for an injured Jay Cutler, lofted a pass toward the left sideline to Bennett, who made Nick Collins whiff on the tackle and then raced untouched into the endzone for a 35-yard touchdown, but Green Bay still won the game 21–14.

==== 2011 season ====
In Week 2 against the Saints, Bennett was injured, and did not return to the game. This eventually created controversy in 2012 after the Saints were caught using a bounty program. In Week 9, Bennett's return helped the Bears defeat the Eagles with a touchdown pass. However, after the Eagles game, Bennett was fined $5,000 for wearing bright orange cleats. After he wore the shoes again against the Detroit Lions the following week, the league told him that wearing the shoes again will result in an increase of $5,000 in his fines. The league later informed him that wearing the cleats a third consecutive time will result in him being ejected and the Bears being penalized. After wearing the cleats in 2012 against the Lions, the league fined him once again. On December 12, Bennett was signed to a four-year extension, keeping him with the Bears through 2014.

==== 2012 season ====
In Week 17 against the Lions, Bennett caught five passes for 109 yards, a career best, and one touchdown. As a result, Bennett became the first Bears receiver besides Brandon Marshall to compile more than 80 yards in a game in 2012.

==== 2013 season ====
In 2013, Bennett caught 32 passes for 243 yards and a career-high four touchdowns. Bennett missed the 2013 week 17 game against the Green Bay Packers after his brother's death.

On March 18, 2014, Bennett was released by the Bears after refusing to have his salary reduced.

=== Cleveland Browns ===
On May 14, 2014, Bennett signed with the Cleveland Browns. On June 17, his contract was terminated by the Browns.

== Post-playing career ==
Bennett was named the director of player development at his alma mater Vanderbilt on February 8, 2021.

== Personal life ==
In 2012, Bennett held "The Prime Experience with Earl Bennett" at III Forks to help benefit his charity, "Earl Bennett's Legends for Literacy".

Bennett was among the honorees at the Sheraton Hotel & Towers at a CSN fundraiser event.

In January 2015, Bennett returned to Vanderbilt University to complete his educational studies degree from Peabody College of Education and Human Development. Bennett earned his Ph.D. in Philosophy from the University of Houston in 2022.

Earl is married to Rekeshia Bennett. They have a son, Earl Bennett Jr. and daughters, Skylah and Selah Bennett.
