= Kurt Page =

Profile
- Position: Quarterback

Personal information
- Born: c. 1963

Career information
- College: Vanderbilt (1981–1984)

Kurt Page (born c. 1963) is a former American football quarterback. He played college football for the Vanderbilt Commdores from 1982 to 1985. As a junior in 1983, he broke Pat Sullivan's SEC single-season total-offense record and John Reaves' single-season passing-yardage record, and ranked among the leading quarterbacks in major-college football with 553 total plays (1st), 493 pass attempts (1st), 29 passing interceptions (1st), 3,034 total yards (3rd), 288.9 yards gained per game played (3rd), 5.4 total yards per play (4th), 3,178 passing yards (4th), and 286 pass completions (4th).
