= D. J. Moore (cornerback) =

American football player (born 1987)

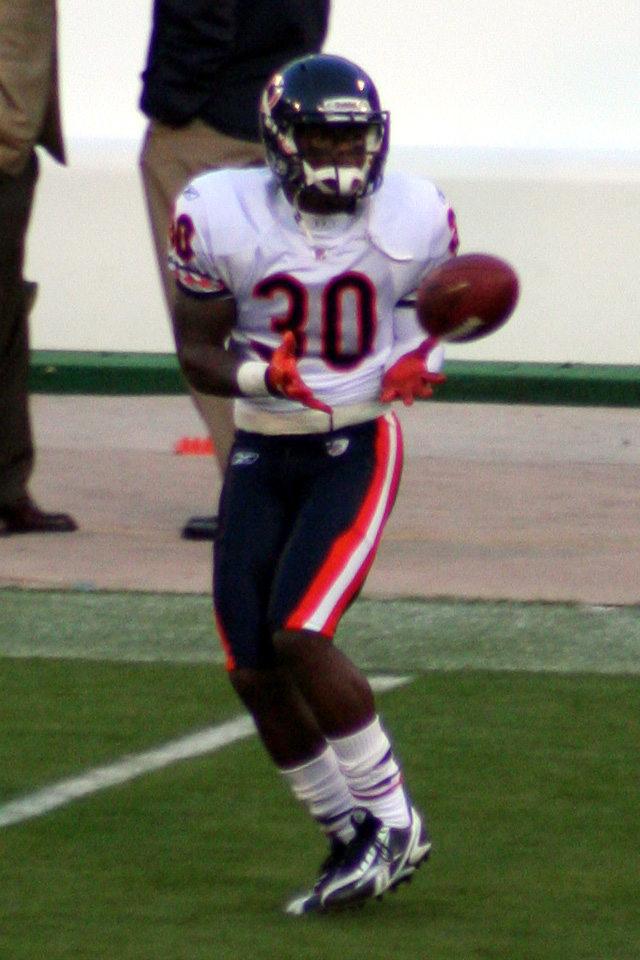
- Moore with the Chicago Bears in 2009

No. 30, 20
- Position: Cornerback

Personal information
- Born: March 22, 1987 (age 39); Lakeland, Florida, U.S.
- Listed height: 5 ft 9 in (1.75 m)
- Listed weight: 182 lb (83 kg)

Career information
- High school: Broome (Spartanburg, South Carolina)
- College: Vanderbilt
- NFL draft: 2009: 4th round, 119th overall pick

Career history
- Chicago Bears (2009–2012); Carolina Panthers (2013); Tampa Bay Buccaneers (2014)*
- * Offseason or practice squad member only

Awards and highlights
- First-team All-American (2008); 2× First-team All-SEC (2007, 2008)

Career NFL statistics
- Total tackles: 123
- Sacks: 1.0
- Forced fumbles: 1
- Pass deflections: 22
- Interceptions: 10
- Defensive touchdowns: 2
- Stats at Pro Football Reference

David James "D.J." Moore (born March 22, 1987) is an American former professional football player who was a cornerback in the National Football League (NFL). He played college football for the Vanderbilt Commodores and was selected 119th overall in the fourth round of the 2009 NFL draft by the Chicago Bears.

== Early life ==
In high school, he was a four-year football varsity player at Broome High School in Spartanburg, South Carolina. He was a player that played both offense and defense, starting at wide receiver and defensive back. As a senior, had 48 receptions for 896 yards and 14 touchdowns; one rush for an 84-yard touchdown; three punt return touchdowns; 39 tackles and 6 interceptions on defense. He also played basketball in high school, helping squad to state title as a junior. As a senior in basketball, he averaged 15 points, 10 rebounds, and five assists.

=== High school accomplishments ===
- AA Special Teams Player of the Year
- Region 2-2A Player of the Year
- Two-time All-State Wide Receiver
- 2004 State Title for Football
- 2004 State Championship Football MVP
- Three-time All-State in Basketball
- Track and Field State Champion as High jumper

== College career ==
Moore played college football for the Vanderbilt Commodores for three seasons, playing in 37 games, while starting 34 of them as defensive back. Moore recorded 13 interceptions in his career, which is tied for third in school history.

While playing at Vanderbilt, he garnered First-team All-SEC honors from the Associated Press in his sophomore and junior years. He was also named an All-American in his junior year, as he helped lead Vanderbilt to victory in the 2008 Music City Bowl, exactly 53 years since the team's last victory at a bowl. In an interview following the game, Moore announced that he would forgo his senior season to enter the NFL draft.

== Professional career ==
Pre-draft measurables
Height	Weight	Arm length	Hand span	40-yard dash	10-yard split	20-yard split	20-yard shuttle	Three-cone drill	Vertical jump	Broad jump	Bench press
5 ft 8 7/8 in (1.75 m)	192 lb (87 kg)	30 1/2 in (0.77 m)	8 1/2 in (0.22 m)	4.57 s	1.54 s	2.67 s	4.28 s	7.00 s	39.5 in (1.00 m)	9 ft 10 in (3.00 m)	17 reps
All values from NFL Combine/Pro Day

=== Chicago Bears ===
Moore was selected by the Chicago Bears in the fourth round of the 2009 NFL draft. On May 29, 2009, he signed a 4-year deal with Chicago, signing him through 2012. Moore appeared in three games in his rookie season, serving as a backup cornerback behind Charles Tillman and Corey Graham at the left cornerback position. During the 2010 season, Moore saw considerable playing time contributing as the nickelback when the team left its base 4–3 coverage. He intercepted two passes from Tony Romo during a game against the Dallas Cowboys. On October 24, 2010, he intercepted a pass from Donovan McNabb of the Washington Redskins and ran it back 54 yards for a touchdown. Moore also returned another McNabb interception for a touchdown, but it was nullified due to a holding penalty. In the 2011 season against the Detroit Lions, Moore was ejected from the game for starting a brawl after Lions quarterback Matthew Stafford pulled him down by the helmet.

After the 2012 season the Bears decided not to re-sign Moore.

=== Carolina Panthers ===
On March 19, 2013, Moore signed a one-year contract with the Carolina Panthers. He was released on October 21, 2013.

=== Tampa Bay Buccaneers ===
On February 14, 2014, the Tampa Bay Buccaneers signed Moore, reuniting him with his former coach in Chicago, Lovie Smith.

== NFL career statistics ==
Legend
**Bold**	Career high

=== Regular season ===
Year	Team	Games		Tackles					Interceptions					Fumbles			
Year	Team	GP	GS	Cmb	Solo	Ast	Sck	TFL	Int	Yds	TD	Lng	PD	FF	FR	Yds	TD
2009	CHI	3	0	0	0	0	0.0	0	0	0	0	0	0	0	0	0	0
2010	CHI	16	0	42	**37**	5	**1.0**	**6**	**4**	**95**	**1**	**54**	**8**	**1**	0	0	0
2011	CHI	13	1	**44**	31	**13**	0.0	0	**4**	31	**1**	20	**8**	0	0	0	0
2012	CHI	13	2	32	27	5	0.0	2	2	2	0	2	6	0	0	0	0
2013	CAR	2	0	5	4	1	0.0	0	0	0	0	0	0	0	0	0	0
		47	3	123	99	24	1.0	8	10	128	2	54	22	1	0	0	0

=== Postseason ===
Year	Team	Games		Tackles					Interceptions					Fumbles			
Year	Team	GP	GS	Cmb	Solo	Ast	Sck	TFL	Int	Yds	TD	Lng	PD	FF	FR	Yds	TD
2010	CHI	2	1	10	10	0	0.0	0	0	0	0	0	0	0	0	0	0
		2	1	10	10	0	0.0	0	0	0	0	0	0	0	0	0	0
