= Bucky Curtis =

American football player (1929–2019)

- Curtis at Vanderbilt

No. 85
- Position: End/Defensive back

Personal information
- Born: March 3, 1929; Virginia, U.S.
- Died: October 24, 2019 (aged 90); Louisville, Kentucky, U.S.
- Listed height: 6 ft 3 in (1.91 m)
- Listed weight: 215 lb (98 kg)

Career information
- High school: Riverside Military Academy
- College: Vanderbilt (1947–1950)
- NFL draft: 1951: 2nd round, 26th overall pick

Career history
- 1951: Cleveland Browns
- 1955–1956: Toronto Argonauts

Awards and highlights
- First-team All-American (1950); First-team All-SEC (1950); Senior Bowl MVP (1951); Vandy Athletics Hall of Fame; RMA Sports Hall of Fame

Ernest Jackson "Bucky" Curtis, Jr. (March 3, 1929 − October 24, 2019) was an American football player for the Vanderbilt Commodores of Vanderbilt University. He led the nation in several receiving categories in 1950 including a 29.3 yard average per reception, and was selected as an All-American. The team's quarterback was Bill Wade. Curtis was then drafted in the second round of the 1951 NFL draft by the defending NFL champion Cleveland Browns. Curtis made the Browns for the 1951 season, but was drafted for service in the Korean War before the season started. Curtis served his four years in the Navy, expecting to be signed by the Browns for the upcoming 1955 season. When he and the Browns had trouble reaching a contract, he signed with the Toronto Argonauts of the Canadian Football League (CFL). He was elected to the Vanderbilt Athletics Hall of Fame in 2010.

== Early life ==
Curtis attended Riverside Military Academy in Gainesville, Georgia from 1943 to 1947, where his father was a teacher. His father gave later Vanderbilt coach Red Sanders his first coaching job. Bucky is a member of the school's sports Hall of Fame.

On why the nickname "Bucky", Curtis explained "When I was a youngster, I asked for it as a nickname because there was a football player at Notre Dame named Bucky O'Connor. He played for the Irish in the mid-1940s and was kind of my hero. And I never outgrew the nickname."

== See also ==
- 1950 College Football All-America Team
