= Chuck Scott =

American football player (born 1963)

No. 84, 47
- Position: Wide receiver

Personal information
- Born: May 24, 1963 (age 63); Jacksonville, Florida, U.S.
- Listed height: 6 ft 2 in (1.88 m)
- Listed weight: 198 lb (90 kg)

Career information
- High school: Lake Howell (FL)
- College: Vanderbilt
- NFL draft: 1985: 2nd round, 50th overall pick

Career history
- Los Angeles Rams (1985–1986); Dallas Cowboys (1987); San Francisco 49ers (1988)*
- * Offseason or practice squad member only

Awards and highlights
- First-team All-American (1983); 2× First-team All-SEC (1983, 1984)

Career NFL statistics
- Receptions: 6
- Receiving yards: 87
- Stats at Pro Football Reference

Charles John Miller Scott (born May 24, 1963) is an American former professional football player who was a wide receiver in the National Football League (NFL) for the Los Angeles Rams and Dallas Cowboys. He played college football at Vanderbilt University.

== Early life ==
Scott attended Lake Howell High School, where he participated in football and track. He accepted a football scholarship from Vanderbilt University. As a freshman, he played mostly on special teams.

As a sophomore, he was named starter at flanker, posting 21 receptions for 273 yards (13-yard avg.) and 3 touchdowns. In the 1982 Hall of Fame Classic, he caught five passes for 93 yards in a 28-36 loss against Air Force.

As a junior, he played on a team with a 2-9 record, which led the league in pass attempts because it usually played from behind. He was switched to tight end, setting an NCAA record for the position with 70 receptions (third in school history and second on the team) and tied the record with 9 touchdowns, while also tallying 971 receiving yards (third in school history and led the team). He was recognized by The Sporting News as a first-team All-American.

As a senior, he played between the flanker and tight end position, collecting 54 receptions (second on the team) for 975 yards (second in school history and led the team), with a 18.1-yard average and 8 touchdowns.

Scott finished his college career with 145 receptions (second in school history), 2,219 yards (second in school history), a 15.3-yard average and 20 touchdowns (second in school history).

In 2007, he was recognized as an SEC Football Legend.

== Professional career ==
=== Los Angeles Rams ===
Scott was selected by the Los Angeles Rams in the second round (50th overall) of the 1985 NFL draft. On September 3, he was placed on the injured reserve list with a shoulder injury he suffered in the third preseason game.

On September 1, 1986, he was waived only to be recalled from waivers on September 3. He played in just 8 games, making 5 receptions for 76 yards, before being placed on the injured reserve list on November 13. Scott was released on September 7, 1987.

=== Dallas Cowboys ===
After the NFLPA strike was declared on the third week of the 1987 season, those contests were canceled (reducing the 16 game season to 15) and the NFL decided that the games would be played with replacement players. In September, he was signed to be a part of the Dallas replacement team that was given the mock name "Rhinestone Cowboys" by the media. He appeared in 2 games as a third-string wide receiver. His only statistic was one reception for 11 yards against the Philadelphia Eagles. He was released on October 26, at the end of the strike.

=== San Francisco 49ers ===
In 1988, he was signed as a free agent by the San Francisco 49ers. He was released on August 14.

== Personal life ==
Scott works for a ministry in Nashville named Young Life.
