= 2016 Vanderbilt Commodores football team =

American college football season

2016 Vanderbilt Commodores football

Independence Bowl, L 17–41 vs. NC State
- Conference: Southeastern Conference
- Eastern Division
- Record: 6–7 (3–5 SEC)
- Head coach: Derek Mason (3rd season)
- Offensive coordinator: Andy Ludwig (2nd season)
- Offensive scheme: Pro-style
- Base defense: 3–4
- Home stadium: Vanderbilt Stadium

2016 Southeastern Conference football standings
	Conf.			Overall
Team	W		L	W		L
Eastern Division
No. 14 Florida x	6	–	2	9	–	4
No. 22 Tennessee	4	–	4	9	–	4
Georgia	4	–	4	8	–	5
Kentucky	4	–	4	7	–	6
South Carolina	3	–	5	6	–	7
Vanderbilt	3	–	5	6	–	7
Missouri*	2	–	6	4	–	8
Western Division
No. 2 Alabama x$^	8	–	0	14	–	1
No. 24 Auburn	5	–	3	8	–	5
No. 13 LSU	5	–	3	8	–	4
Texas A&M	4	–	4	8	–	5
Arkansas	3	–	5	7	–	6
Mississippi State	3	–	5	6	–	7
Ole Miss*	2	–	6	5	–	7
Championship: Alabama 54, Florida 16
^ – College Football Playoff participant; $ – Conference champion; x – Division champion/co-champions; * Ole Miss and Missouri vacated all wins due to NCAA violations.; Rankings from AP Poll

The 2016 Vanderbilt Commodores football team represented Vanderbilt University during the 2016 NCAA Division I FBS football season. The Commodores played their home games at Vanderbilt Stadium at Dudley Field in Nashville, Tennessee and competed in the Eastern Division of the Southeastern Conference (SEC). They were led by third-year head coach Derek Mason. This was Vanderbilt's 126th season of college football. They finished the season 6–7, 3–5 in SEC play to finish in a tie for fifth place in the Eastern Division. They were invited to the Independence Bowl where they lost to NC State.

== Schedule ==
Vanderbilt announced its 2016 football schedule on October 29, 2015. The 2016 schedule consisted of six home and six away games in the regular season. The Commodores host SEC foes Florida, Ole Miss, South Carolina, and Tennessee, and traveled to Auburn, Georgia, Kentucky, and Missouri.

The Commodores hosted two of its four of its non–conference games, which were against Georgia Tech Yellow Jackets from the Atlantic Coast Conference, Middle Tennessee and Western Kentucky (WKU) both from Conference USA, and Tennessee State from the Ohio Valley Conference.

Date	Time	Opponent	Site	TV	Result	Attendance
September 1	7:00 p.m.	South Carolina	Vanderbilt Stadium; Nashville, TN	ESPN	L 10–13	30,304
September 10	3:00 p.m.	Middle Tennessee*	Vanderbilt Stadium; Nashville, TN	SECN+	W 47–24	29,627
September 17	11:30 a.m.	at Georgia Tech*	Bobby Dodd Stadium; Atlanta, GA (rivalry)	ACCN	L 7–38	41,916
September 24	3:30 p.m.	at Western Kentucky*	Houchens Industries–L. T. Smith Stadium; Bowling Green, KY	CBSSN	W 31–30 ^{OT}	23,674
October 1	11:00 a.m.	No. 23 Florida	Vanderbilt Stadium; Nashville, TN	SECN	L 6–13	30,565
October 8	3:00 p.m.	at Kentucky	Commonwealth Stadium; Lexington, KY (rivalry)	SECN	L 13–20	55,030
October 15	11:00 a.m.	at Georgia	Sanford Stadium; Athens, GA (rivalry)	SECN	W 17–16	92,746
October 22	6:30 p.m.	No. 25 (FCS) Tennessee State †*	Vanderbilt Stadium; Nashville, TN	ESPNU	W 35–17	31,084
November 5	11:00 a.m.	at No. 11 Auburn	Jordan–Hare Stadium; Auburn, AL	ESPN	L 16–23	87,451
November 12	2:30 p.m.	at Missouri	Faurot Field; Columbia, MO	SECN	L 17–26	50,261
November 19	7:00 p.m.	Ole Miss	Vanderbilt Stadium; Nashville, TN (rivalry)	SECN	W 38–17	27,763
November 26	6:30 p.m.	No. 24 Tennessee	Vanderbilt Stadium; Nashville, TN (rivalry)	SECN	W 45–34	38,108
December 26	4:00 p.m.	vs. NC State*	Independence Stadium; Shreveport, LA (Independence Bowl)	ESPN2	L 17–41	28,995
*Non-conference game; Rankings from AP Poll released prior to game; All times are in Central time

Schedule source:

== Coaching staff ==
Name	Position
Derek Mason	Head coach/defensive coordinator
Andy Ludwig	Offensive coordinator/tight ends coach
Jeff Genyk	Special teams coordinator/running backs coach
C.J. Ah You	Defensive line coach
Gerry Gdowski	Quarterbacks Coach/recruiting coordinator
Cortez Hankton	Wide receivers coach
Chris Marve	Inside linebackers coach
Marc Mattioli	Defensive backs coach
Osia Lewis	Outside linebackers coach
Cameron Norcross	Offensive line coach
James Dobson	Head strength coach
Jason Grooms	Asst. athletics director and director of football operations
Tyler Barnes	Director of player personnel
Tom Bossung	Head athletic trainer
Rayna Stewart	Director of high school relations
Gary Veach	Head equipment manager
Matt Britain	Assistant director of operations
Mike Kroeger	Player development & operations assistant
Tyler Clarke	Assistant director, strength
Aaron Hill	Assistant strength coach
Ben Schumacher	Assistant strength coach
Cedric Calhoun	Quality control – defense
Kevin Abrams	Graduate assistant – offense
Tate Benton	Graduate assistant – offense
Davis Dudchock	Graduate assistant – football administration
Ryan Blakney	Quality control offense
Rod Chance	Quality control defense
Mike Morita	Quality control offense

== Coaching changes ==
On December 15, 2015, coach Mason announced that special teams coach Charles Bankins, OL Coach Keven Lightner will not be retained for 2016. Mason cited a difference in philosophy rather than poor performance for the coaching changes.

"I just see this football team moving in a different direction and I just wanted to make sure these men were treated the right way," Mason said. "I feel like it’s time for us to move forward."

== Recruiting ==
College recruiting (2016)
Name	Hometown	School	Height	Weight	40^{‡}	Commit date
			N/A	N/A	–	
Recruit ratings: No ratings found
Overall recruit ranking: Scout: 50 Rivals: 50 247Sports: 50 ESPN: 48
‡ Refers to 40-yard dash; Note: In many cases, Scout, Rivals, 247Sports, On3, and ESPN may conflict in their listings of height, weight and 40 time.; In these cases, the average was taken. ESPN grades are on a 100-point scale.; Sources: "2016 Team Ranking". Rivals.com.

== Game summaries ==
=== South Carolina ===
	1	2	3	4	Total
South Carolina	0	0	3	10	13
Vanderbilt	3	7	0	0	10

=== Middle Tennessee ===
	1	2	3	4	Total
Middle Tennessee	10	7	7	0	24
Vanderbilt	5	28	0	14	47

=== Georgia Tech ===
	1	2	3	4	Total
Vanderbilt	7	0	0	0	7
Georgia Tech	14	3	14	7	38

=== WKU ===
	1	2	3	4	OT	Total
Vanderbilt	0	7	7	10	7	31
WKU	7	7	0	10	6	30

=== Florida ===
	1	2	3	4	Total
#23 Florida	0	10	0	3	13
Vanderbilt	0	3	3	0	6

=== Kentucky ===
	1	2	3	4	Total
Vanderbilt	3	0	7	3	13
Kentucky	7	10	0	3	20

=== Georgia ===
	1	2	3	4	Total
Vanderbilt	7	0	3	7	17
Georgia	3	3	7	3	16

=== Tennessee State ===
	1	2	3	4	Total
#25 (FCS) Tennessee State	14	3	0	0	17
Vanderbilt	7	14	7	7	35

=== Auburn ===
	1	2	3	4	Total
Vanderbilt	3	10	0	3	16
Auburn	7	3	10	3	23

Vanderbilt's November 5 meeting with Auburn at Jordan-Hare stadium was notable for eventual All-American LB Zach Cunningham's blocked FG in the fourth quarter. Auburn's Daniel Carlson lined up to kick a 35-yard field goal with 1:45 left in the fourth quarter to give the Tigers a 10-point lead. Cunningham, who after the game described watching special teams tape to learn the snap timing of the field goal team, leaped over Auburn's offensive line between the center and left guard to block Carlson's kick. Although Vanderbilt turned the ball over on the ensuing possession to seal Auburn's victory, the play became iconic for Cunningham during his redshirt junior season.

=== Missouri ===
	1	2	3	4	Total
Vanderbilt	0	10	7	0	17
Missouri	6	13	0	7	26

=== Ole Miss ===
	1	2	3	4	Total
Ole Miss	10	0	0	7	17
Vanderbilt	7	7	17	7	38

=== Tennessee ===
	1	2	3	4	Total
Tennessee	14	17	3	0	34
Vanderbilt	7	17	7	14	45

Vanderbilt's 45–34 win over the Tennessee Volunteers represented the Commodores' 6th win on the season, guaranteeing Vanderbilt's eligibility for Bowl play for the first time since 2013, and the first time during Mason's tenure as Vanderbilt's head coach. Prior to this game, which was played at Vanderbilt Stadium on November 26, Vanderbilt's high Academic Performance Index (API) introduced the possibility of bowl play even with a 5–7 season end record, as the 5–7 teams with the best API are rewarded with bowl appearances.

However, Vanderbilt avoided dependence upon the API and defeated state rival Tennessee, also for the first time since 2013. Kyle Shurmur led Vanderbilt in a breakout performance with 412 passing yards, and Ralph Webb eclipsed Zac Stacy's school record for career rushing yards. Vanderbilt outscored Tennessee 21–3 in the second half and iced the victory with a touchdown rush from Webb late in the fourth quarter.

=== NC State–Independence Bowl ===
	1	2	3	4	Total
NC State	0	14	14	13	41
Vanderbilt	3	0	7	7	17
