= Bob Goodridge =

American football player (born 1946)

No. 82
- Position: Wide receiver

Personal information
- Born: May 11, 1946 (age 80); Cincinnati, Ohio, U.S.
- Listed height: 6 ft 2 in (1.88 m)
- Listed weight: 190 lb (86 kg)

Career information
- High school: Wyoming (Wyoming, Ohio)
- College: Vanderbilt (1964–1967)
- NFL draft: 1968: 6th round, 144th overall pick

Career history
- Minnesota Vikings (1968)

Awards and highlights
- SEC Player of the Year (1967); First-team All-SEC (1967)

Career NFL statistics
- Receptions: 1
- Receiving yards: 5
- Stats at Pro Football Reference

Robert Wayne Goodridge (born May 11, 1946) is an American former professional football player who was a wide receiver for one season with the Minnesota Vikings of the National Football League (NFL). He played college football for the Vanderbilt Commodores and was selected by the Vikings in the sixth round of the 1968 NFL/AFL draft.

== Early life ==
Goodridge was a four-year letterman in football, basketball and track at Wyoming High School in Wyoming, Ohio. He was a two-way starter his junior and senior years. He earned First-team All-Miami Valley Interscholastic League honors both seasons, was captain of the MVIL Offensive Team in 1963 and garnered WCPO First-team All-City defense recognition. Goodridge returned seven punts and one kickoff for touchdowns his last two seasons. He earned First-team All-City and Second-team All-Region honors in basketball. He also averaged 15.5 points per game his senior year. Goodridge was inducted into the Wyoming High School Hall of Fame in 1992.

== College career ==
Goodridge joined the Vanderbilt Commodores in 1964 and saw playing time from 1966 to 1967. He became the first player in Southeastern Conference history to record more than 1,000 receiving yards and was named SEC Player of the Year. He also played in the Blue-Gray game and the Senior Bowl. Goodridge finished his college career with totals of 1,164 yards and six touchdowns on 82 receptions.

== Professional career ==
Goodridge was selected in the sixth round by the Minnesota Vikings of the NFL with the 144th overall pick in the 1968 NFL/AFL draft. He played in eleven games for the Vikings during the 1968 season.

== Personal life ==
Goodridge has coached football as head coach at various high schools in the Cincinnati area. He has also worked as a schoolteacher.
