= Greg Zolman =

American football player (born 1978)

No. 10, 12
- Position: Quarterback

Personal information
- Born: October 19, 1978 (age 48); Kettering, Ohio, U.S.
- Listed height: 6 ft 2 in (1.88 m)
- Listed weight: 220 lb (100 kg)

Career information
- High school: Miamisburg
- College: Vanderbilt
- NFL draft: 2002: undrafted

Career history
- Indianapolis Colts (2002)*; Green Bay Packers (2002)*; Tampa Bay Buccaneers (2003)*; St. Louis Rams (2003)*; Rhein Fire (2004); Buffalo Bills (2004)*
- * Offseason or practice squad member only

Greg R. Zolman (born October 19, 1978) is an American former football quarterback. He was a member of several National Football League (NFL) teams over a three-year period and played a year in NFL Europe. He played college football at Vanderbilt.

== College career ==
Zolman became the starter for Vanderbilt about halfway through his freshman year in 1998 and was the starting quarterback the final three seasons. By the time Zolman left Vanderbilt, he held every meaningful passing record in school history including the school's all-time leading passer with 7,981 yards until surpassed by Jay Cutler.

== Professional career ==
Pre-draft measurables
Height	Weight	Arm length	Hand span	40-yard dash	10-yard split	20-yard split	20-yard shuttle	Three-cone drill	Vertical jump	Broad jump	Wonderlic
6 ft 1 3/4 in (1.87 m)	220 lb (100 kg)	31 in (0.79 m)	8 in (0.20 m)	4.90 s	1.67 s	2.80 s	4.14 s	7.08 s	34.0 in (0.86 m)	9 ft 4 in (2.84 m)	23
All values from Pro Day

Zolman played on five different NFL teams: Buffalo, Green Bay, Indianapolis, St. Louis, and Tampa Bay. He played one season in NFL Europe for the Rhein Fire.

== Sources ==
- "Zolman Playing in NFL Europe", Dayton Daily News, May 13, 2004
- "Zolman Rushes to Catch Up in Quarterback Competition", St. Louis Post-Dispatch, August 1, 2003
- "Zolman Throws for Career-High 441 Yards", Dayton Daily News, November 13, 2001
- "Zolman Nears Top of Vandy's Career Passing Mark", Columbus Ledger-Enquirer (GA), September 28, 2001
- "The Bull's-Eye Is on the Quarterback: Zolman Guides Vandy Offense That Has Thrown Caution to Wind", Birmingham News, September 26, 2001
- "QB Zolman Figures in Team's Cautious Optimism", Birmingham News, August 2, 2001
- "Zolamn Leads Commodores, Miamisburg soph sparks resurgence at Vanderbilt", Dayton Daily News, September 26, 1999
