= Leonard Coleman =

American football player (born 1962)

No. 47, 31
- Position: Cornerback

Personal information
- Born: January 30, 1962 (age 64); Boynton Beach, Florida, U.S.
- Listed height: 6 ft 2 in (1.88 m)
- Listed weight: 203 lb (92 kg)

Career information
- High school: Lake Worth (FL)
- College: Vanderbilt
- NFL draft: 1984: 1st round, 8th overall pick

Career history
- Memphis Showboats (1985); Indianapolis Colts (1985–1987); San Diego Chargers (1988–1989)

Awards and highlights
- First-team All-American (1983); First-team All-SEC (1983)

Career NFL statistics
- Interceptions: 6
- Fumble recoveries: 2
- Stats at Pro Football Reference

Leonard David Coleman (born January 30, 1962) is an American former professional football player who was a cornerback in the United States Football League (USFL) and National Football League (NFL).

Coleman was born in Boynton Beach, Florida, a suburb of Miami, and played scholastically at nearby Lake Worth High School. He played collegiately for the Vanderbilt Commodores, and, as a senior, was selected as a first-team All-American by Gannett News Service (GNS).

Coleman was selected by the Indianapolis Colts in the first round of the 1984 NFL draft, the first player drafted by the team following its relocation from Baltimore. He sat out the 1984 NFL season because of a contract dispute, instead signing a deal with the Memphis Showboats of the United States Football League and completing his degree at Vanderbilt. Early in the 1985 season, however, Coleman joined the Colts after the club bought out his contract with Memphis. He started all 16 games for Indianapolis in 1986, but played in only four games in 1987.

Coleman was traded to the Chargers for an undisclosed draft pick on July 9, 1988, playing 16 games in 1988 and one in 1989 before being waived on September 12, 1989.
