= 2017 Vanderbilt Commodores football team =

American college football season

2017 Vanderbilt Commodores football
- Conference: Southeastern Conference
- East Division
- Record: 5–7 (1–7 SEC)
- Head coach: Derek Mason (4th season)
- Offensive coordinator: Andy Ludwig (3rd season)
- Offensive scheme: Pro-style
- Base defense: 3–4
- Home stadium: Vanderbilt Stadium

2017 Southeastern Conference football standings
	Conf.			Overall
Team	W		L	W		L
Eastern Division
No. 2 Georgia x$^	7	–	1	13	–	2
South Carolina	5	–	3	9	–	4
Kentucky	4	–	4	7	–	6
Missouri	4	–	4	7	–	6
Florida	3	–	5	4	–	7
Vanderbilt	1	–	7	5	–	7
Tennessee	0	–	8	4	–	8
Western Division
No. 10 Auburn xy	7	–	1	10	–	4
No. 1 Alabama x#^	7	–	1	13	–	1
No. 18 LSU	6	–	2	9	–	4
No. 19 Mississippi State	4	–	4	9	–	4
Texas A&M	4	–	4	7	–	6
Ole Miss*	3	–	5	6	–	6
Arkansas	1	–	7	4	–	8
Championship: Georgia 28, Auburn 7
# – College Football Playoff champion; ^ – College Football Playoff participant; $ – Conference champion; x – Division champion/co-champions; y – Championship game participant; * Ole Miss ineligible for postseason due to NCAA sanctions; Rankings from AP Poll

The 2017 Vanderbilt Commodores football team represented Vanderbilt University in the 2017 NCAA Division I FBS football season. The Commodores played their home games at Vanderbilt Stadium in Nashville, Tennessee and compete in the East Division of the Southeastern Conference (SEC). They were led by fourth-year head coach Derek Mason. The team earned a final record of 5–7 (1–7 SEC) in a season notable for wins against Kansas State, then in the top 20, and Tennessee, but also for sizeable losses against SEC opponents Alabama (by 59 points), Georgia (by 31), and Missouri (by 28). The Tennessee win at Neyland Stadium was the Commodores' fourth in six games, a feat unequaled by VU in that rivalry since 1926.

== Schedule ==
Vanderbilt announced its 2017 football schedule on September 13, 2016. The 2017 schedule consisted of 7 home games and 5 away games in the regular season. The Commodores hosted SEC foes Alabama, Georgia, Kentucky, and Missouri, and traveled to Florida, Ole Miss, South Carolina, and Tennessee.

The Commodores hosted three of their four non–conference games, against Alabama A&M from the Southwestern Athletic Conference, Kansas State from the Big 12 Conference and Western Kentucky from Conference USA. Vanderbilt traveled to Middle Tennessee (also from Conference USA) and ended a five-game losing streak in opening games dating from 2012.

Date	Time	Opponent	Site	TV	Result	Attendance
September 2	7:00 p.m.	at Middle Tennessee*	Johnny "Red" Floyd Stadium; Murfreesboro, TN	CBSSN	W 28–6	26,717
September 9	3:00 p.m.	Alabama A&M*	Vanderbilt Stadium; Nashville, TN	SECN	W 42–0	25,802
September 16	6:30 p.m.	No. 18 Kansas State*	Vanderbilt Stadium; Nashville, TN	ESPNU	W 14–7	40,350
September 23	2:30 p.m.	No. 1 Alabama	Vanderbilt Stadium; Nashville, TN (SEC Nation)	CBS	L 0–59	40,350
September 30	11:00 a.m.	at No. 21 Florida	Ben Hill Griffin Stadium; Gainesville, FL	ESPN	L 24–38	84,478
October 7	11:00 a.m.	No. 5 Georgia †	Vanderbilt Stadium; Nashville, TN (rivalry)	ESPN	L 14–45	36,282
October 14	2:30 p.m.	at Ole Miss	Vaught–Hemingway Stadium; Oxford, MS (rivalry)	SECN	L 35–57	60,157
October 28	3:00 p.m.	at South Carolina	Williams-Brice Stadium; Columbia, SC	SECN	L 27–34	78,992
November 4	11:00 a.m.	Western Kentucky*	Vanderbilt Stadium; Nashville, TN	ESPNU	W 31–17	26,350
November 11	3:00 p.m.	Kentucky	Vanderbilt Stadium; Nashville, TN (rivalry)	SECN	L 21–44	27,346
November 18	6:30 p.m.	Missouri	Vanderbilt Stadium; Nashville, TN	SECN	L 17–45	22,910
November 25	3:00 p.m.	at Tennessee	Neyland Stadium; Knoxville, TN (rivalry)	SECN	W 42–24	83,117
*Non-conference game; Rankings from AP Poll released prior to game; All times are in Central time

Schedule source:

== Game summaries ==
=== Middle Tennessee ===
	1	2	3	4	Total
Vanderbilt	14	7	7	0	28
MTSU	0	0	0	6	6

First meeting	Result	Overall record	Home	Away	Last meeting	Result
1915	Vanderbilt 30–0	13–3	10–3	3–0	2016	Vanderbilt, 47–24

=== Alabama A&M ===
	1	2	3	4	Total
Alabama A&M	0	0	0	0	0
Vanderbilt	14	21	7	0	42

First meeting	Result	Overall record	Home	Away	Last meeting	Result
	First game in series					

=== Kansas State ===
	1	2	3	4	Total
Kansas State	0	7	0	0	7
Vanderbilt	7	0	0	7	14

First meeting	Result	Overall record	Home	Away	Last meeting	Result
1984	Vanderbilt 26–14	1–0	1–0	0–0	1984	Vanderbilt 26–14

=== Alabama ===
	1	2	3	4	Total
Alabama	21	10	21	7	59
Vanderbilt	0	0	0	0	0

First meeting	Result	Overall record	Home	Away	Last meeting	Result
1903	Vanderbilt 30–0	19–61–4	13–28–2	6–31–2	2011	Alabama 34–0

=== Florida ===
	1	2	3	4	Total
Vanderbilt	7	10	0	7	24
Florida	7	10	7	14	38

First meeting	Result	Overall record	Home	Away	Last meeting	Result
1945	Vanderbilt 7–0	10–37–2	7–15–1	3–22–1	2016	Florida 13–6

=== Georgia ===
	1	2	3	4	Total
Georgia	7	14	17	7	45
Vanderbilt	0	7	0	7	14

First meeting	Result	Overall record	Home	Away	Last meeting	Result
1893	Vanderbilt 35–0	19–56–2	11–25–2	8–31	2016	Vanderbilt 17–16

=== Ole Miss ===
	1	2	3	4	Total
Vanderbilt	0	21	0	14	35
Ole Miss	7	28	12	10	57

First meeting	Result	Overall record	Home	Away	Last meeting	Result
1894	Vanderbilt 40–0	38–50–2	27–24–2	11–26	2016	Vanderbilt 38–17

=== South Carolina ===
	1	2	3	4	Total
Vanderbilt	7	6	7	7	27
South Carolina	14	10	7	3	34

First meeting	Result	Overall record	Home	Away	Last meeting	Result
1961	South Carolina 23–7	4–22	2–11	2–11	2016	South Carolina 13–10

=== Western Kentucky ===
	1	2	3	4	Total
Western Kentucky	7	7	3	0	17
Vanderbilt	14	7	7	3	31

First meeting	Result	Overall record	Home	Away	Last meeting	Result
1931	Vanderbilt 52–6	4–1	3–1	1–0	2016	Vanderbilt 31–30 OT

=== Kentucky ===
	1	2	3	4	Total
Kentucky	7	13	21	3	44
Vanderbilt	7	0	14	0	21

First meeting	Result	Overall record	Home	Away	Last meeting	Result
1896	Vanderbilt 6–0	42–43–4	27–19–2	15–24–2	2016	Kentucky 13–6

=== Missouri ===
	1	2	3	4	Total
Missouri	7	28	3	7	45
Vanderbilt	0	0	17	0	17

First meeting	Result	Overall record	Home	Away	Last meeting	Result
1895	Missouri 14–0	3–5–1	1–1–1	2–4	2016	Missouri 26–17

=== Tennessee ===
	1	2	3	4	Total
Vanderbilt	7	14	0	21	42
Tennessee	14	0	3	7	24

First meeting	Result	Overall record	Home	Away	Last meeting	Result
1892	Vanderbilt 12–0	31–75–5	20–36–4	11–39–1	2016	Vanderbilt 45–34
