= Ke'Shawn Vaughn =

American football player (born 1997)

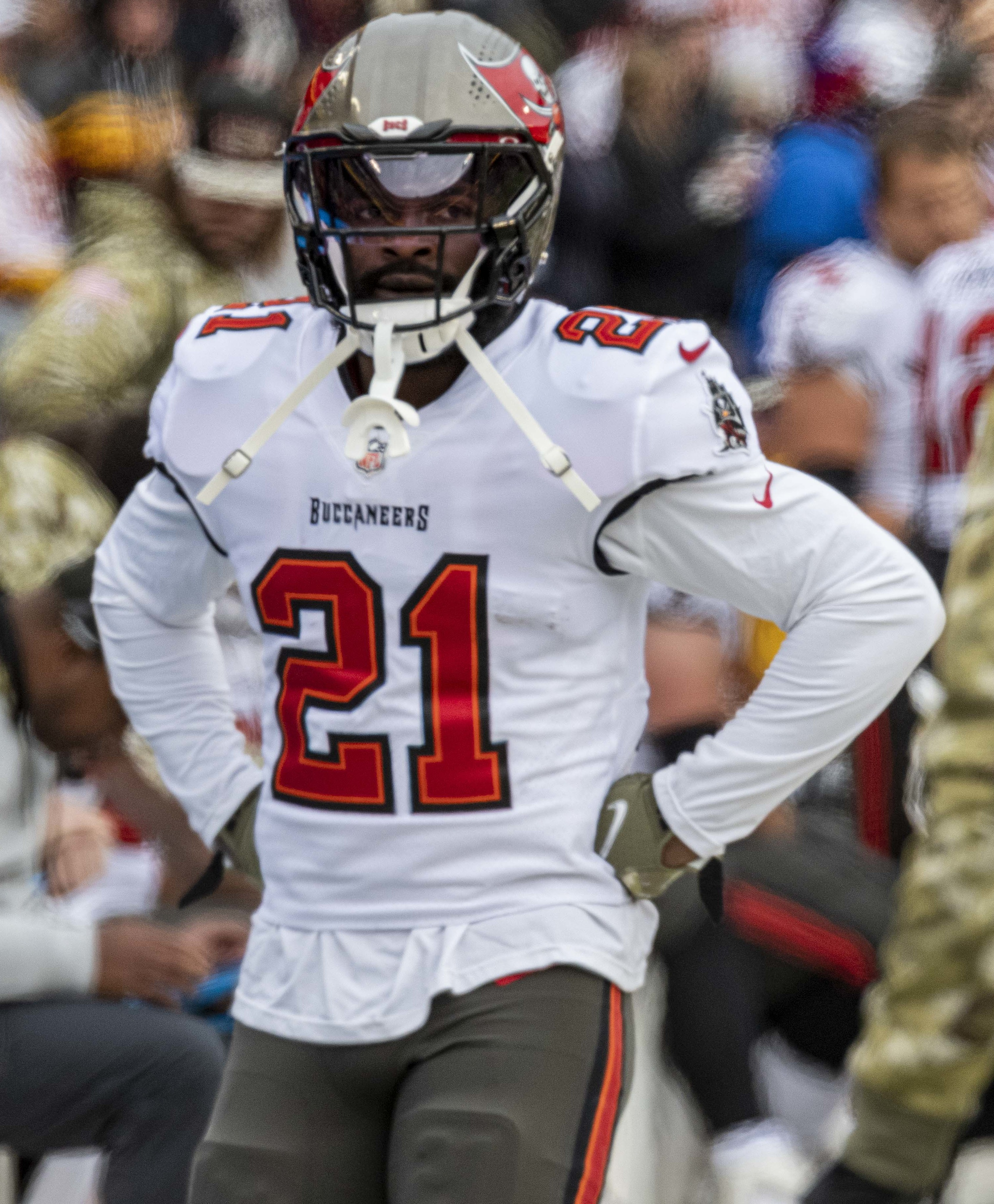
- Vaughn with the Tampa Bay Buccaneers in 2021

Profile
- Position: Running back

Personal information
- Born: May 4, 1997 (age 29); Nashville, Tennessee, U.S.
- Listed height: 5 ft 10 in (1.78 m)
- Listed weight: 214 lb (97 kg)

Career information
- High school: Pearl-Cohn (Nashville)
- College: Illinois (2015–2016); Vanderbilt (2017–2019)
- NFL draft: 2020: 3rd round, 76th overall pick

Career history
- Tampa Bay Buccaneers (2020–2023); New England Patriots (2023)*; San Francisco 49ers (2024)
- * Offseason or practice squad member only

Awards and highlights
- Super Bowl champion (LV); SEC Newcomer of the Year (2018); Second-team All-SEC (2018)

Career NFL statistics as of 2024
- Rushing yards: 388
- Rushing average: 3.7
- Rushing touchdowns: 2
- Receptions: 14
- Receiving yards: 81
- Receiving touchdowns: 1
- Stats at Pro Football Reference

Ke'Shawn LaMont Vaughn (born May 4, 1997) is an American professional football running back. He played college football for the Illinois Fighting Illini and Vanderbilt Commodores. He was selected by the Tampa Bay Buccaneers in third round of 2020 NFL draft, Vaughn has also played for the New England Patriots.

== Early life ==
Vaughn attended Pearl-Cohn Comprehensive High School in Nashville, Tennessee. As a senior, he rushed for 2,646 yards and 45 touchdowns and was named the Tennessee Gatorade Football Player of the Year. Vaughn was also a high school track and field standout, anchoring the state champion 4 x 100m relay his senior year. A 4-star running back recruit, Vaughn committed to the University of Illinois to play college football over offers from Louisville, Notre Dame, Purdue, and West Virginia, among others.

== College career ==
As a true freshman at Illinois in 2015, Vaughn rushed for 723 yards on 157 carries with six touchdowns. As a sophomore in 2016, he had 301 rushing yards on 60 carries and three touchdowns. After the season, Vaughn transferred to Vanderbilt University. After redshirting his first year at Vanderbilt in 2017 due to transfer rules, he rushed for 1,244 yards on 157 carries and 12 touchdowns in 2018. He was named Associated Press Second-team All-SEC for his efforts. Vaughn returned to Vanderbilt for his senior season in 2019 rather than declare for the 2019 NFL draft. He started all 12 games as a senior, rushing for 1,028 yards and 9 touchdown, and caught 29 passes for 286 yards and a touchdown.

== Professional career ==
Pre-draft measurables
Height	Weight	Arm length	Hand span	Wingspan	40-yard dash	10-yard split	20-yard split	Vertical jump	Broad jump
5 ft 9 5/8 in (1.77 m)	214 lb (97 kg)	30 7/8 in (0.78 m)	8 7/8 in (0.23 m)	6 ft 1 1/2 in (1.87 m)	4.51 s	1.55 s	2.66 s	32.0 in (0.81 m)	9 ft 9 in (2.97 m)
All values from NFL Combine

=== Tampa Bay Buccaneers ===
Vaughn was selected by the Tampa Bay Buccaneers in the third round, 76th overall, of the 2020 NFL draft. He was placed on the reserve/COVID-19 list on July 27, 2020. He was activated on August 9. Vaughn scored his first professional touchdown on a nine-yard reception from Tom Brady in a Week 4 victory over the Los Angeles Chargers. Overall, Vaughn finished his rookie season with 26 carries for 109 rushing yards in ten games. Vaughn earned a Super Bowl ring when the Buccaneers defeated the Kansas City Chiefs 31–9 in Super Bowl LV.

On December 26, 2021, in a game against the Carolina Panthers, Vaughn scored the first rushing touchdown of his career on a 55-yard tote, the longest score of the year on the ground for the Buccaneers.

Vaughn was waived by the Buccaneers on December 15, 2023.

=== New England Patriots ===
On December 19, 2023, the New England Patriots signed Vaughn to their practice squad. He signed a reserve/future contract on January 8, 2024. On May 13, Vaughn was released by the Patriots.

=== San Francisco 49ers ===
On August 7, 2024, Vaughn signed with the San Francisco 49ers. He was released by the team on August 26, and re-signed to the practice squad.

On August 9, 2025, Vaughn re-signed with the 49ers. He was released on August 25.
