= Allama Matthews =

American football player (born 1961)

No. 49
- Positions: Tight end, running back

Personal information
- Born: August 24, 1961 (age 65); Jacksonville, Florida, U.S.
- Listed height: 6 ft 3 in (1.91 m)
- Listed weight: 230 lb (104 kg)

Career information
- High school: Andrew Jackson (Jacksonville)
- College: Vanderbilt
- NFL draft: 1983: 12th round, 322nd overall pick

Career history
- Atlanta Falcons (1983–1985)

Awards and highlights
- First-team All-American (1982); First-team All-SEC (1982)

Career NFL statistics
- Receptions: 11
- Receiving yards: 101
- Receiving touchdowns: 1
- Stats at Pro Football Reference

Allama Uzair Matthews (born August 24, 1961) is an American former professional football player who was a tight end and h-back in the National Football League (NFL).

Born and raised in Jacksonville, Florida, Matthews played scholastically at Andrew Jackson High School. He played college football for the Vanderbilt Commodores, where, as a senior, he was honored by The Football News as a first-team All-American.

Early in his Vanderbilt career, coaches tried Matthews at safety and receiver. Once all parties settled on tight end, Matthews put together one of the finest receiving campaigns ever, helping spark the team's run to the Hall of Fame Bowl. In 1982, Matthews was named first-team All-America by Football News after posting 61 receptions for 797 yards and 14 touchdowns, most ever by a Commodore. Later that season, Matthews was also named SEC Offensive Lineman of the Year by the Atlanta Touchdown Club. Matthews also earned First-team All-SEC honors by the Associated Press and United Press International in 1982. He concluded his Vanderbilt career with 18 touchdowns.

Matthews was selected by the Atlanta Falcons in the twelfth-round of the 1983 NFL draft. He spent three seasons with the Falcons, appearing in 37 games, with 11 receptions and 1 touchdown.
