= 2013 Kentucky Wildcats football team =

American college football season

2013 Kentucky Wildcats football
- Conference: Southeastern Conference
- Eastern Division
- Record: 2–10 (0–8 SEC)
- Head coach: Mark Stoops (1st season)
- Offensive coordinator: Neal Brown (1st season)
- Offensive scheme: Air raid
- Defensive coordinator: D. J. Eliot (1st season)
- Base defense: 4–3
- Home stadium: Commonwealth Stadium

2013 Southeastern Conference football standings
	Conf.			Overall
Team	W		L	W		L
Eastern Division
No. 5 Missouri x	7	–	1	12	–	2
No. 4 South Carolina	6	–	2	11	–	2
Georgia	5	–	3	8	–	5
No. 24 Vanderbilt	4	–	4	9	–	4
Florida	3	–	5	4	–	8
Tennessee	2	–	6	5	–	7
Kentucky	0	–	8	2	–	10
Western Division
No. 2 Auburn xy$	7	–	1	12	–	2
No. 7 Alabama x%	7	–	1	11	–	2
No. 14 LSU *	5	–	3	10	–	3
No. 18 Texas A&M	4	–	4	9	–	4
Mississippi State	3	–	5	7	–	6
Ole Miss *	3	–	5	8	–	5
Arkansas	0	–	8	3	–	9
Championship: Auburn 59, Missouri 42
$ – BCS representative as conference champion; % – BCS at-large representative; x – Division champion/co-champions; y – Championship game participant; * LSU and Ole Miss vacated all wins (except for Ole Miss' Music City Bowl win) due to NCAA violations.; Rankings from AP Poll

The 2013 Kentucky Wildcats football team represented the University of Kentucky as a member of the Eastern Division of the Southeastern Conference (SEC) during the 2013 NCAA Division I FBS football season. Led by first-year head coach Mark Stoops, the Wildcats compiled an overall record of 2–10 with a mark of 0–8 in conference play, placing last out of six teams in the SEC"s Eastern Division. Kentucky played home games at Commonwealth Stadium in Lexington, Kentucky.

== Schedule ==
Date	Time	Opponent	Site	TV	Result	Attendance
August 31	7:00 p.m.	vs. Western Kentucky*	LP Field; Nashville, TN	ESPNews	L 26–35	47,623
September 7	12:00 p.m.	Miami (OH)*	Commonwealth Stadium; Lexington, KY	SECRN	W 41–7	54,846
September 14	12:00 p.m.	No. 7 Louisville*	Commonwealth Stadium; Lexington, KY (Governor's Cup)	ESPN	L 13–27	65,445
September 28	7:00 p.m.	No. 20 Florida	Commonwealth Stadium; Lexington, KY (rivalry)	ESPNU	L 7–24	62,076
October 5	7:30 p.m.	at No. 13 South Carolina	Williams–Brice Stadium; Columbia, SC	SECRN	L 28–35	82,313
October 12	7:00 p.m.	No. 1 Alabama	Commonwealth Stadium; Lexington, KY	ESPN2	L 7–48	69,873
October 24	7:30 p.m.	at Mississippi State	Davis Wade Stadium; Starkville, MS	ESPN	L 22–28	55,102
November 2	7:30 p.m.	Alabama State*	Commonwealth Stadium; Lexington, KY	CSS	W 48–14	53,797
November 9	12:00 p.m.	No. 9 Missouri	Commonwealth Stadium; Lexington, KY	ESPNU	L 17–48	55,280
November 16	12:21 p.m.	at Vanderbilt	Vanderbilt Stadium; Nashville, TN (rivalry)	SEC TV	L 6–22	33,488
November 23	7:00 p.m.	at Georgia	Sanford Stadium; Athens, GA	ESPNU	L 17–59	92,746
November 30	7:00 p.m.	Tennessee	Commonwealth Stadium; Lexington, KY (rivalry)	ESPNU	L 14–27	54,986
*Non-conference game; Rankings from AP Poll released prior to the game; All times are in Eastern time

== Preseason ==
=== Spring game ===
The 2013 Blue/White Spring Game at Commonwealth Stadium saw the Blue squad squeak out a one-point victory over the White team in the annual scrimmage, 24–23. The program witnessed its largest attendance for a spring game in program history with 50,831 fans.

The Kentucky faithful finally got to see a glimpse of what the new coaching staff had been working on since joining the Big Blue Nation with Stoops coming on board in late November. Stoops promised to bring a new approach to the defensive side of the ball with his offense revisiting a familiar style of play from air-raid era with an up-tempo offense. As the Wildcats put five passing touchdowns on the board, it marked the return of the old air raid sirens that once carried through the Lexington skies on game day.

With very little decided in the way of starters and roles, all five of Kentucky's quarterbacks received reps during Saturday evening's scrimmage, with the majority of the opportunities going to Maxwell Smith, Patrick Towles and Jalen Whitlow. Coach Stoops and offensive coordinator Neal Brown had yet to determine who their starting quarterback would be going into the fall. However, with fairly equal playing time divvied up amongst the signal callers, it was Whitlow who threw and rushed for the most yardage in Brown's new-look schemes. Whitlow displayed a strong, accurate arm, finding multiple receivers, and showing off his speed which gave him a unique element to his game. He finished the night 17-of-28 with 193 yards and two touchdowns, while scampering for 49 net yards on seven attempts on the ground while toggling back and forth between the Blue and White squads.

=== Class of 2013 signees ===
College recruiting information (2013)
Name	Hometown	School	Height	Weight	40^{‡}	Commit date
Jeff Badet; WR	Orlando, Florida	Freedom	6 ft 0 in (1.83 m)	170 lb (77 kg)	N/A	Feb 1, 2013
Jeff Badet; WR	Recruit ratings: Scout: Rivals: (77)					
Alvonte Bell; DE	Miramar, Florida	Everglades	6 ft 6 in (1.98 m)	230 lb (100 kg)	N/A	Jun 5, 2012
Alvonte Bell; DE	Recruit ratings: Scout: Rivals: (79)					
Javess Blue; WR	Babson Park, Florida	Butler CC	6 ft 1 in (1.85 m)	195 lb (88 kg)	N/A	Jan 13, 2012
Javess Blue; WR	Recruit ratings: Scout: Rivals: (83)					
Steven Borden Jr. TE	Waxahachie, Texas	Kilgore College	6 ft 3 in (1.91 m)	250 lb (110 kg)	4.5	Dec 19, 2012
Steven Borden Jr. TE	Recruit ratings: Scout: Rivals: (77)					
Justin Day; OT	Aiken, South Carolina	South Aiken	6 ft 8 in (2.03 m)	290 lb (130 kg)	N/A	Jun 29, 2012
Justin Day; OT	Recruit ratings: Scout: Rivals: (40)					
Jason Hatcher; DE	Louisville, Kentucky	Trinity	6 ft 3 in (1.91 m)	235 lb (107 kg)	N/A	Feb 6, 2013
Jason Hatcher; DE	Recruit ratings: Scout: Rivals: (83)					
Nick Haynes; OG	Niceville, Florida	Niceville	6 ft 4 in (1.93 m)	295 lb (134 kg)	N/A	Feb 3, 2013
Nick Haynes; OG	Recruit ratings: Scout: Rivals: (70)					
Jacob Hyde; DT	Manchester, Kentucky	Clay County	6 ft 4 in (1.93 m)	310 lb (140 kg)	N/A	Mar 1, 2012
Jacob Hyde; DT	Recruit ratings: Scout: Rivals: (78)					
Jaleel Hytchye; DB	Cincinnati, Ohio	LaSalle	5 ft 11 in (1.80 m)	170 lb (77 kg)	N/A	Jan 5, 2013
Jaleel Hytchye; DB	Recruit ratings: Scout: Rivals: (81)					
Jojo Kemp; RB	DeLand, Florida	DeLand	5 ft 10 in (1.78 m)	190 lb (86 kg)	N/A	Feb 1, 2013
Jojo Kemp; RB	Recruit ratings: Scout: Rivals: (81)					
Austin MacGinnis; K	Prattville, Alabama	Prattville	5 ft 11 in (1.80 m)	175 lb (79 kg)	N/A	Jun 23, 2012
Austin MacGinnis; K	Recruit ratings: Scout: Rivals: (75)					
Blake McClain; DB	Orlando, Florida	Winter Park	5 ft 11 in (1.80 m)	180 lb (82 kg)	N/A	Jun 27, 2012
Blake McClain; DB	Recruit ratings: Scout: Rivals: (75)					
Marcus McWilson; DB	Youngstown, Ohio	Cardinal Mooney	6 ft 0 in (1.83 m)	195 lb (88 kg)	N/A	Jan 28, 2013
Marcus McWilson; DB	Recruit ratings: Scout: Rivals: (78)					
Kyle Meadows; OT	West Chester, Ohio	Lakota West	6 ft 6 in (1.98 m)	280 lb (130 kg)	N/A	Jan 12, 2013
Kyle Meadows; OT	Recruit ratings: Scout: Rivals: (79)					
Regie Meant; DT	Cape Coral, Florida	Baker	6 ft 5 in (1.96 m)	270 lb (120 kg)	N/A	Jan 15, 2013
Regie Meant; DT	Recruit ratings: Scout: Rivals: (74)					
Ramsey Meyers; OG	Jacksonville, Florida	Ridgeview	6 ft 3 in (1.91 m)	300 lb (140 kg)	N/A	Jun 23, 2012
Ramsey Meyers; OG	Recruit ratings: Scout: Rivals: (73)					
Alex Montgomery; WR	Weston, Florida	Cypress Bay	6 ft 1 in (1.85 m)	180 lb (82 kg)	4.5	Jan 28, 2013
Alex Montgomery; WR	Recruit ratings: Scout: Rivals: (78)					
Reese Phillips; QB	Chattanooga, Tennessee	Signal Mountain	6 ft 3 in (1.91 m)	215 lb (98 kg)	N/A	Jun 6, 2012
Reese Phillips; QB	Recruit ratings: Scout: Rivals: (69)					
Khalid Thomas; RB	Tallahassee, Florida	Godby	5 ft 10 in (1.78 m)	175 lb (79 kg)	4.5	Aug 7, 2012
Khalid Thomas; RB	Recruit ratings: Scout: Rivals: (79)					
Ryan Timmons; WR	Frankfort, Kentucky	Franklin County	5 ft 10 in (1.78 m)	190 lb (86 kg)	4.4	Feb 5, 2013
Ryan Timmons; WR	Recruit ratings: Scout: Rivals: (81)					
Za'Darius Smith; DE	Scooba, Mississippi	East Mississippi CC	6 ft 5 in (1.96 m)	258 lb (117 kg)	4.5	Dec 19, 2012
Za'Darius Smith; DE	Recruit ratings: Scout: Rivals: (83)					
Nate Willis; DB	Pahokee, Florida	Arizona Western College	6 ft 0 in (1.83 m)	180 lb (82 kg)	4.4	Jan 16, 2012
Nate Willis; DB	Recruit ratings: Scout: Rivals: (78)					
Overall recruit ranking:
Note: In many cases, Scout, Rivals, 247Sports, On3, and ESPN may conflict in their listings of height and weight.; In these cases, the average was taken. ESPN grades are on a 100-point scale.; Sources: "2013 Kentucky Football Commitment List". Rivals.; "2013 Kentucky Football Commits". Scout.; "ESPN". ESPN.; "Scout.com Team Recruiting Rankings". Scout.; "2013 Team Ranking". Rivals.com.

== Game summaries ==
=== Vs. Western Kentucky ===
Kentucky vs Western Kentucky

Team	1	2	3	4	Total
Wildcats	3	14	0	9	26
• Hilltoppers	7	14	7	7	35

- Location: Nashville, Tennessee
- Game start: 7:15 p.m.
- Elapsed time: 3:33
- Game attendance: 46,723
- Game weather: Partly Cloudy, 89 degrees
- Referee: Tom Ritter
- TV announcers (ESPNews): Joe Davis (play-by-play), David Diaz-Infante (color)

Scoring summary
1	10:53	WKU	Keshawn Simpson 3-yard run (Garrett Schwettman kick)	WKU 7–0
1	4:35	Kentucky	Joe Mansour 22-yard field goal	WKU 7–3
2	14:21	WKU	Antonio Andrews 3-yard run (Garrett Schwettman kick)	WKU 14–3
2	12:47	Kentucky	Jalen Whitlow 19-yard run (Joe Mansour kick)	WKU 14–10
2	7:46	WKU	Keshawn Simpson 3-yard run (Garrett Schwettman kick)	WKU 21–10
2	3:25	Kentucky	Jonathan George 5-yard run (Joe Mansour kick)	WKU 21–17
3	1:50	WKU	Mitchell Henry 9-yard pass from Brandon Doughty (Garrett Schwettman kick)	WKU 28–17
4	13:32	WKU	Leon Allen 14-yard run (Garrett Schwettman kick)	WKU 35–17
4	9:53	Kentucky	Joe Mansour 30-yard field goal	WKU 35–20
4	1:37	Kentucky	Demarco Robinson 34-yard pass from Maxwell Smith (Joe Mansour kick)	WKU 35–26

Statistics	UK	WKU
First downs	15	22
Total yards	419	487
Rushing yards	216	216
Passing yards	203	271
Turnovers	1	2
Time of possession	24:37	35:23

Team	Category	Player	Statistics
Kentucky	Passing	Maxwell Smith	8/13, 125 yards, TD
Kentucky	Rushing	Raymond Sanders	14 rushes, 98 yards
Kentucky	Receiving	Demarco Robinson	5 receptions, 69 yards, TD
Western Kentucky	Passing	Brandon Doughty	27/34, 271 yards, TD
Western Kentucky	Rushing	Antonio Andrews	20 rushes, 99 yards, TD
Western Kentucky	Receiving	Mitchell Henry	6 receptions, 65 yards, TD

Keshawn Simpson ran for a pair of 3-yard touchdowns and Antonio Andrews added his own 3-yard score as Western Kentucky beat Kentucky 35–26 Saturday night making coach Bobby Petrino a winner in his debut.

The Hilltoppers also beat their in-state rival for a second straight year, though they didn't need overtime like they did last year in this win over the Southeastern Conference program. They outgained Kentucky 487–419 in total offense and held the ball for 35 minutes.

Brandon Doughty was 27 of 34 for 271 yards and a TD, numbers that would have been better except for at least four drops including a would-be touchdown.

The loss ruined Kentucky coach Mark Stoops' debut. coordinator Neal Brown's Air Raid offense struggled against a Western Kentucky defense returning seven starters from a bowl team that went 7–6 last season in the Sun Belt Conference.

=== Miami (OH) ===
Miami (OH) vs Kentucky

Team	1	2	3	4	Total
RedHawks	7	0	0	0	7
• Wildcats	24	7	0	10	41

- Location: Lexington, Kentucky
- Game start: 12:08 p.m.
- Elapsed time: 3:19
- Game attendance: 54,846
- Game weather: Sunny, 80 degrees
- Referee: Matt Moore
- Television network: FSN

Scoring summary
1	13:08	Kentucky	Jalen Whitlow 9-yard run (Joe Mansour kick)	UK 7–0
1	7:58	Kentucky	Joe Mansour 22-yard field goal	UK 10–0
1	5:54	Kentucky	Jonathan George 48-yard pass from Maxwell Smith (Joe Mansour kick)	UK 17–0
1	3:20	Miami	Chris Wade 6-yard fumble recovery (Ken Patterson kick)	UK 17–7
1	1:58	Kentucky	Javess Blue 88-yard pass from Maxwell Smith (Joe Mansour kick)	UK 24–7
2	10:10	Kentucky	Raymond Sanders 5-yard run (Joe Mansour kick)	UK 31–7
4	14:15	Kentucky	Joe Mansour 21-yard field goal	UK 34–7
4	11:53	Kentucky	Jeff Badet 56-yard pass from Maxwell Smith (Joe Mansour kick)	UK 41–7

Statistics	MOH	UK
First downs	8	27
Total yards	122	675
Rushing yards	99	262
Passing yards	23	413
Turnovers	0	1
Time of possession	30:21	29:39

Team	Category	Player	Statistics
Miami (OH)	Passing	Austin Boucher	4/14, 23 yards
Miami (OH)	Rushing	Austin Boucher	19 rushes, 28 yards
Miami (OH)	Receiving	Alvonta Jenkins	1 reception, 11 yards
Kentucky	Passing	Maxwell Smith	15/23, 310 yards, 3 TD
Kentucky	Rushing	Jojo Kemp	12 rushes, 78 yards
Kentucky	Receiving	Javess Blue	6 receptions, 114 yards, TD

Maxwell Smith threw three long touchdown passes and Jalen Whitlow and Raymond Sanders each added scoring runs as Kentucky beat Miami (Ohio) 41–7 on Saturday.

The Wildcats made a winner of first-year coach Mark Stoops and Smith, who started for the first time since a season-ending ankle injury last September.

Most importantly for the Wildcats (1–1) was how Smith helped offensive coordinator Neal Brown's pass-oriented "Air Raid" philosophy take flight with TD passes of 48 yards to Jonathan George, 88 to Javess Blue and 56 to Jeff Badet. He completed 15 of 23 passes for 310 yards, 210 by halftime, as Kentucky outgained Miami 675–122 and allowed the RedHawks' only score on a fumbled punt return.

=== No. 7 Louisville ===
Louisville vs Kentucky

Team	1	2	3	4	Total
• No. 7 Cardinals	3	7	10	7	27
Wildcats	3	0	0	10	13

- Location: Lexington, Kentucky
- Game start: 12:02 p.m.
- Elapsed time: 3:10
- Game attendance: 65,445
- Game weather: 63 degrees, Sunny
- Referee: Jeffrey Akers
- TV announcers (ESPN): Beth Mowins (play-by-play), Joey Galloway (color)

Scoring summary
1	9:54	Louisville	John Wallace 26-yard field goal	UL 3–0
1	2:23	Kentucky	Joe Mansour 37-yard field goal	TIED 3–3
2	2:36	Louisville	DaVante Parker 13-yard pass from Teddy Bridgewater (John Wallace kick)	UL 10–3
3	10:39	Louisville	Senorise Perry 1-yard run (John Wallace kick)	UL 17–3
3	2:31	Louisville	John Wallace 21-yard field goal	UL 20–3
4	14:12	Kentucky	Joe Mansour 30-yard field goal	UL 20–6
4	11:29	Louisville	Senorise Perry 36-yard run (John Wallace kick)	UL 27–6
4	6:21	Kentucky	Alex Montgomery 3-yard pass from Jalen Whitlow (Joe Mansour kick)	UL 27–13

Statistics	LOU	UK
First downs	22	17
Total yards	492	376
Rushing yards	242	162
Passing yards	250	214
Turnovers	1	3
Time of possession	34:06	25:54

Team	Category	Player	Statistics
Louisville	Passing	Teddy Bridgewater	16/28, 250 yards, TD
Louisville	Rushing	Senorise Perry	11 rushes, 100 yards, 2 TD
Louisville	Receiving	Damian Copeland	3 receptions, 81 yards
Kentucky	Passing	Maxwell Smith	9/20, 109 yards
Kentucky	Rushing	Jojo Kemp	5 rushes, 80 yards
Kentucky	Receiving	Ryan Timmons	3 receptions, 72 yards

Heisman hopeful Teddy Bridgewater got off to a slow start as Kentucky's defense kept him and his receivers in check for much of the first half. He began 1 of 4 for 10 yards and had just 58 yards through one quarter, looking especially out of sync in throwing behind Robert Clark after the Cardinals recovered a Whitlow fumble at the Wildcats 27. Wallace salvaged the drive with a 36-yard field goal for a 3–0 lead. Even when Bridgewater seemed to get going in hitting Parker for 10 yards, the receiver fumbled and Kentucky's Ashley Lowery recovered, setting up Mansour's 37-yard field to tie the game.

The Wildcats' defense closed running lanes for Michael Dyer and other Cardinals backs and even sacking Bridgewater for just the second time this season. But Kentucky's offense couldn't take advantage as receivers dropped passes from Maxwell Smith–who took all but two snaps in the first half–while Raymond Sanders fumbled a handoff at the Louisville 13 late in the second quarter. Smith and Whitlow combined to complete just 17 of 37 passes for 214 yards for the Wildcats.

Senorise Perry ran for 100 yards and two touchdowns and Bridgewater overcame a shaky start to pass for 250 yards and No. 7 Louisville scored on four consecutive drives to pull away from rival Kentucky for a 27–13 victory on Saturday. Perry finished with 100 yards on 11 carries while Bridgewater completed 16 of 28 attempts to help the Cardinals earn their third straight Governor's Cup.

=== No. 20 Florida ===
Florida vs Kentucky

Team	1	2	3	4	Total
• No. 20 Gators	7	14	0	3	24
Wildcats	7	0	0	0	7

- Location: Lexington, Kentucky
- Game start: 7:02 p.m.
- Elapsed time: 2:48
- Game attendance: 65,445
- Game weather: Partly Cloudy, 78 degrees
- Referee: Marc Curles
- TV announcers (ESPNU): Clay Matvick (play-by-play), Matt Stinchcomb (color)

Scoring summary
1	7:13	Florida	Matt Jones 2-yard run (Austin Hardin kick)	FLA 7–0
1	1:46	Kentucky	Joe Mansour 25-yard run (Joe Mansour kick)	TIED 7–7
2	9:40	Florida	Trey Burton 24-yard pass from Tyler Murphy (Austin Hardin kick)	FLA 14–7
2	2:53	Florida	Tyler Murphy 5-yard run (Austin Hardin kick)	FLA 21–7
4	10:49	Florida	Austin Hardin 33-yard field goal	FLA 24–7

Statistics	FLA	UK
First downs	22	12
Total yards	402	173
Rushing yards	246	48
Passing yards	156	125
Turnovers	1	1
Time of possession	38:09	21:51

Team	Category	Player	Statistics
Florida	Passing	Tyler Murphy	15/18, 156 yards, TD, INT
Florida	Rushing	Matt Jones	28 rushes, 176 yards, TD
Florida	Receiving	Trey Burton	6 receptions, 66 yards, TD
Kentucky	Passing	Maxwell Smith	12/20, 90 yards, INT
Kentucky	Rushing	Joe Mansour	1 rush, 25 yards, TD
Kentucky	Receiving	Alexander Montgomery	4 receptions, 47 yards

Joe Mansour's 25-yard run on a fake field goal was the only TD for Kentucky (1–3, 0–1), which was outgained 402–173. That trick play was Kentucky's only highlight on a night that largely belonged to Murphy and the Gators.

Matt Jones rushed for 176 yards and a touchdown and Tyler Murphy threw for 156 yards and a score as No. 20 Florida beat Kentucky 24–7 on Saturday night, its 27th straight win over the Wildcats. Jones, who had 28 carries, outgained Kentucky by himself while he and Murphy provided all of the Gators' touchdowns in the first half to extend the longest active winning streak over a major opponent. Murphy also rushed for a 3-yard TD in his first career start for the Gators (3–1, 2–0 Southeastern Conference), who closed a difficult week on a high note after losing starting quarterback Jeff Driskel and defensive tackle Dominique Easley to season-ending injuries.

Florida gave Gators wide receivers coach Joker Phillips a fresh start after his firing last fall as Wildcats coach.

=== At No. 13 South Carolina ===
Kentucky vs South Carolina

Team	1	2	3	4	Total
Wildcats	0	7	0	21	28
• No. 13 Gamecocks	14	10	3	8	35

- Location: Columbia, South Carolina
- Game start: 7:38 p.m.
- Elapsed time: 3:06
- Game attendance: 82,313
- Game weather: Clear, 81 degrees
- Referee: Matt Moore
- TV announcers (FSN): Bob Rathbun (play-by-play), Tim Couch (color)

Scoring summary
1	13:21	South Carolina	Matt Jones 2-yard run (Austin Hardin kick)	SC 7–0
1	6:26	South Carolina	Mike Davis 22 yd run (Elliott Fry kick)	SC 14–0
2	14:20	South Carolina	Mike Davis 1 yd run (Elliott Fry kick)	SC 21–0
2	7:38	Kentucky	Raymond Sanders 2 yd run (Joe Mansour kick))	SC 21–7
2	0:12	South Carolina	Elliott Fry 40 yd field goal	SC 24–7
3	4:59	South Carolina	Elliott Fry 41 yd field goal	SC 27–7
4	13:43	Kentucky	Dem. Robinson 4 yd pass from Jalen Whitlow (Joe Mansour kick)	SC 27–14
4	11:50	Kentucky	Ryan Timmons 14 yd pass from Jalen Whitlow (Joe Mansour kick)	SC 27–21
4	8:05	South Carolina	Connor Shaw 2 yd run (Nick Jones pass)	SC 35–21
4	4:02	Kentucky	Jalen Whitlow 1 yd run (Joe Mansour kick)	SC 35–28

Statistics	UK	SC
First downs	19	22
Total yards	301	453
Rushing yards	123	178
Passing yards	178	275
Turnovers	0	1
Time of possession	30:15	29:45

Team	Category	Player	Statistics
Kentucky	Passing	Jalen Whitlow	17/24, 178 yards, 2 TD
Kentucky	Rushing	Jalen Whitlow	17 rushes, 69 yards, TD
Kentucky	Receiving	Javess Blue	4 receptions, 62 yards
South Carolina	Passing	Connor Shaw	17/20, 262 yards, TD
South Carolina	Rushing	Mike Davis	21 rushes, 106 yards, 2 TD
South Carolina	Receiving	Damiere Byrd	5 receptions, 98 yards, TD

Kentucky (1–4, 0–2) rallied from a 21–0 deficit to pull within 6 at 27–21 with 11:50 left in the game but could not complete the comeback to upset #13 South Carolina. They were still only down 7 with 4 minutes remaining after a 1-yard touchdown run by Jalen Witlow but South Carolina was able to run out the clock behind SEC leading rusher Mike Davis and beat Kentucky for the 13th time in the last 14 meetings.

South Carolina senior quarterback Connor Shaw completed 17 of 20 passes for 262 yards and rushed for 50 yards. Kentucky quarterback Jalen Witlow complete 17 of 24 passes for 178 yards and 2 touchdowns and rushed for 69 yards and a touchdown. Mike Davis rushed for 106 yards and scored 2 touchdowns for the Gamecocks.

South Carolina played without star defensive end Jadeveon Clowney who was out with an injury.

=== No. 1 Alabama ===
Alabama vs Kentucky

Team	1	2	3	4	Total
• No. 1 Crimson Tide	0	24	10	14	48
Wildcats	0	0	7	0	7

- Location: Lexington, Kentucky
- Game start: 7:06 p.m.
- Elapsed time: 3:26
- Game attendance: 69,873
- Game weather: Mostly Clear, 75 degrees
- Referee: Penn Wagers
- TV announcers (ESPN2): Mark Jones (play-by-play), Brock Huard (color), Lewis Johnson (sideline)

Scoring summary
2	13:08	Alabama	Cade Foster 25 yd field goal	ALA 3–0
2	9:50	Alabama	Kenyan Drake 1 yd run (Cade Foster kick)	ALA 10–0
2	3:39	Alabama	T. J. Yeldon 24 yd run (Cade Foster kick)	ALA 17–0
2	0:24	Alabama	Kenyan Drake 1 yd run (Cade Foster kick)	ALA 24–0
3	11:38	Alabama	T.J. Yeldon 3 yd run (Cade Foster kick)	ALA 31–0
3	7:05	Kentucky	Javess Blue 30 yd pass from Maxwell Smith (Joe Mansour kick)	ALA 31–7
3	1:10	Alabama	Cade Foster 20 yd field goal	ALA 34–7
4	10:04	Alabama	Kevin Norwood 20 yd pass from A. J. McCarron (Cade Foster kick)	ALA 41–7
4	1:41	Alabama	Altee Tenpenny 7 yd run (Cade Foster kick)	ALA 48–7

Statistics	ALA	UK
First downs	35	13
Total yards	668	170
Rushing yards	299	94
Passing yards	369	76
Turnovers	2	0
Time of possession	35:59	24:01

Team	Category	Player	Statistics
Alabama	Passing	A. J. McCarron	21/35, 359 yards, TD
Alabama	Rushing	T. J. Yeldon	16 rushes, 124 yards, 2 TD
Alabama	Receiving	Kevin Norwood	4 receptions, 81 yards, TD
Kentucky	Passing	Maxwell Smith	7/16, 76 yards, TD
Kentucky	Rushing	Raymond Sanders	14 rushes, 72 yards
Kentucky	Receiving	Javess Blue	2 receptions, 44 yards, TD

T.J. Yeldon and Kenyan Drake each ran for two touchdowns and No. 1 Alabama brushed off a few early mistakes to blow out Kentucky 48–7.

After a scoreless first quarter thanks to fumbles by the running backs and dropped passes in Kentucky territory, the Crimson Tide (6–0, 3–0) scored on their last eight possessions and outgained the Wildcats (1–5, 0–3) 668–170. Alabama gained 369 yards through the air including a career-high 359 yards by A. J. McCarron. Kentucky's only score came in the 3rd quarter on a 30-yard touchdown pass from Maxwell Smith to Javess Blue.

Kentucky quarterback Jalen Witlow was injured on a sack early in the game and did not return.

=== At Mississippi State ===
Kentucky vs. Mississippi State

Team	1	2	3	4	Total
Wildcats	7	3	9	3	22
• Bulldogs	14	7	7	0	28

- Location: Starkville, Mississippi
- Game start: 6:31 p.m.
- Elapsed time: 3:24
- Game attendance: 55,102
- Game weather: Clear Skies, 65 degrees
- Referee: Hubert Owens
- Television network: ESPN

Scoring summary
1	11:28	Mississippi State	Malcolm Johnson 60 yd pass from Dak Prescott (Devon Bell kick)	MSU 7–0
1	8:38	Kentucky	Ryan Timmons 51 yd pass from Maxwell Smith (Joe Mansour kick)	TIED 7–7
1	6:34	Mississippi State	Jameon Lewis 19 yd run (Devon Bell kick)	MSU 14–7
2	6:14	Mississippi State	Jameon Lewis 17 yd pass from Dak Prescott (Devon Bell kick)	MSU 21–7
2	0:31	Kentucky	Joe Mansour 45 yd field goal	MSU 21–10
3	5:26	Kentucky	TEAM Safety	MSU 21–12
3	4:19	Kentucky	Jojo Kemp 14 yd run (Joe Mansour kick)	MSU 21–19
3	0:36	Mississippi State	Dak Prescott 17 yd pass from Jameon Lewis (Devon Bell kick)	MSU 28–19
4	8;15	Kentucky	Joe Mansour 44 yd field goal	MSU 28–22

Statistics	UK	MSST
First downs	20	24
Total yards	325	447
Rushing yards	160	152
Passing yards	165	295
Turnovers	0	0
Time of possession	26:06	33:54

Team	Category	Player	Statistics
Kentucky	Passing	Maxwell Smith	18/34, 160 yards, TD
Kentucky	Rushing	Raymond Sanders	15 rushes, 86 yards
Kentucky	Receiving	Ryan Timmons	5 receptions, 69 yards, TD
Mississippi State	Passing	Dak Prescott	23/34, 268 yards, 2 TD
Mississippi State	Rushing	LaDarius Perkins	12 rushes, 65 yards
Mississippi State	Receiving	Malcolm Johnson	4 receptions, 79 yards, TD

Dak Prescott threw for 268 yards and two touchdowns and also caught a 17-yard touchdown pass to lead Mississippi State past Kentucky. Prescott completed a career-high 23 of 34 passes and also rushed for 33 yards. Jameon Lewis had a 19-yard touchdown run, caught a 17-yard scoring pass and also threw the 17-yard touchdown to Prescott on a trick play.

Kentucky's Joe Mansour made a 44-yard field goal with 8:15 remaining to pull the Wildcats to 28–22, but the Wildcats could get no closer. They had pulled to 21–19 in the third quarter on Jojo Kemp's 14-yard touchdown run. Then in what proved to be a key moment, the Wildcats recovered an onside kick, only to have it disallowed because of an offside penalty.

Maxwell Smith completed 18 of 33 passes for 160 yards and a touchdown. Raymond Sanders rushed for 86 and Jojo Kemp rushed for 63 and a touchdown to lead the Wildcats.

=== Alabama State ===
	1	2	3	4	Total
Hornets	7	0	7	0	14
Wildcats	14	17	17	0	48

Statistics	ALST	UK
First downs	13	22
Total yards	297	422
Rushing yards	149	233
Passing yards	148	189
Turnovers	2	0
Time of possession	26:58	33:02

Team	Category	Player	Statistics
Alabama State	Passing	Daniel Duhart	8/23, 97 yards, TD
Alabama State	Rushing	Isaiah Crowell	12 rushes, 84 yards, TD
Alabama State	Receiving	Jamel Johnson	5 receptions, 97 yards, TD
Kentucky	Passing	Jalen Whitlow	16/26, 186 yards, 2 TD
Kentucky	Rushing	Jalen Whitlow	10 rushes, 101 yards, 2 TD
Kentucky	Receiving	Jeff Badet	4 receptions, 48 yards

=== No. 9 Missouri ===
	1	2	3	4	Total
No. 9 Tigers	7	21	7	13	48
Wildcats	3	0	14	0	17

Statistics	MIZ	UK
First downs	16	17
Total yards	426	367
Rushing yards	223	134
Passing yards	203	233
Turnovers	2	1
Time of possession	22:29	37:03

Team	Category	Player	Statistics
Missouri	Passing	Maty Mauk	17/28, 203 yards, 5 TD
Missouri	Rushing	Henry Josey	11 rushes, 113 yards, 2 TD
Missouri	Receiving	Dorial Green-Beckham	7 receptions, 100 yards, 4 TD
Kentucky	Passing	Jalen Whitlow	17/27, 223 yards
Kentucky	Rushing	Jojo Kemp	8 rushes, 45 yards
Kentucky	Receiving	Raymond Sanders	4 receptions, 68 yards

=== At Vanderbilt ===
	1	2	3	4	Total
Wildcats	6	0	0	0	6
Commodores	9	0	0	13	22

Statistics	UK	VAN
First downs	17	14
Total yards	262	313
Rushing yards	142	116
Passing yards	120	197
Turnovers	4	0
Time of possession	27:28	32:32

Team	Category	Player	Statistics
Kentucky	Passing	Jalen Whitlow	14/28, 120 yards, 4 INT
Kentucky	Rushing	Jalen Whitlow	17 rushes, 69 yards
Kentucky	Receiving	Demarco Robinson	4 receptions, 49 yards
Vanderbilt	Passing	Austyn Carta-Samuels	19/24, 184 yards
Vanderbilt	Rushing	Jerron Seymour	21 rushes, 77 yards
Vanderbilt	Receiving	Jordan Matthews	12 receptions, 141 yards

=== At Georgia ===
	1	2	3	4	Total
Wildcats	7	3	0	7	17
Bulldogs	21	14	21	3	59

Statistics	UK	UGA
First downs	10	35
Total yards	211	602
Rushing yards	62	230
Passing yards	149	372
Turnovers	3	2
Time of possession	24:07	35:53

Team	Category	Player	Statistics
Kentucky	Passing	Maxwell Smith	10/16, 149 yards, TD
Kentucky	Rushing	Dyshawn Mobley	10 rushes, 92 yards, TD
Kentucky	Receiving	Javess Blue	5 receptions, 93 yards, TD
Georgia	Passing	Hutson Mason	13/19, 189 yards, TD
Georgia	Rushing	Todd Gurley	8 rushes, 77 yards
Georgia	Receiving	Todd Gurley	5 receptions, 90 yards, 2 TD

=== Tennessee ===
	1	2	3	4	Total
Volunteers	14	6	7	0	27
Wildcats	0	7	0	7	14

Statistics	TENN	UK
First downs	22	23
Total yards	417	393
Rushing yards	218	139
Passing yards	199	254
Turnovers	2	1
Time of possession	28:30	31:30

Team	Category	Player	Statistics
Tennessee	Passing	Joshua Dobbs	14/23, 199 yards, 2 TD, INT
Tennessee	Rushing	Rajion Neal	20 rushes, 134 yards, TD
Tennessee	Receiving	Jason Croom	2 receptions, 74 yards, TD
Kentucky	Passing	Maxwell Smith	25/38, 254 yards, 2 TD
Kentucky	Rushing	Dyshawn Mobley	17 rushes, 143 yards
Kentucky	Receiving	Jeff Badet	6 receptions, 47 yards

== Personnel ==
=== Roster ===
2013 Kentucky Wildcats football team roster
Players
Coaches
Offense

Pos.	#	Name	Class
WR	1	Ryan Timmons	Fr
QB	2	Jalen Whitlow	So
RB	4	Raymond Sanders	Sr
RB	5	Braylon Heard	Jr
WR	6	A.J. Legree	So
WR	8	Javess Blue	Jr
WR	9	Demarco Robinson	Jr
QB	11	Max Smith	So
QB	12	Reese Phillips	Fr
WR	13	Jeff Badet	Fr
QB	14	Patrick Towles	So
WR	17	Alex Montgomery	Fr
RB	21	Josh Clemons	So
WR	23	Daryl Collins	So
RB	24	Jojo Kemp	Fr
RB	25	Jonathan George	Sr
RB, WR	27	Demitrious Davis	Fr
WR	28	Joey Herrick	So
WR	29	Austin Sheehan	Fr
RB	31	John Giddens	So
RB	33	Dyshawn Mobley	So
FB	37	Cody Jones	Sr
FB	39	DJ Warren	Jr
TE	46	Patrick Ligon	Sr
TE	48	John Ballis	Fr
G	55	Jordan Watson	Fr
G	57	Zach Myers	Fr
G	58	Shaquille Love	So
OT	62	Tyler Davenport	Jr
G	63	Bill Davis	So
C	64	Max Godby	Jr
G	68	Nick Haynes	Fr
G	69	Ramsey Meyers	Fr
OT	70	Jordan Swindle	So
G	71	John Gruenschlaeger	So
C	72	Jon Toth	Fr
OT	73	Kyle Meadows	Fr
G	74	Cole Mosier	Fr
G	75	Zach West	So
G	76	Teven Eatmon-Nared	Jr
OT	77	Darrian Miller	Jr
G	79	Kevin Mitchell	Sr
TE	80	Ronnie Shields	Jr
WR	83	Cameron Fogle	Fr
WR	84	Miles Thompson	Fr
TE	85	Steven Borden	Jr
TE	86	Jordan Aumiller	Sr
WR	87	Lucas Witt	Jr
WR	88	A.J. Johnson	Jr
TE	89	Tyler Robinson	Sr

Defense

Pos.	#	Name	Class
LB	2	Alvin Dupree	Jr
CB	3	Fred Tiller	So
S	5	Ashely Lowery	Jr
DE	6	Jason Hatcher	Fr
LB	7	Daron Blaylock	So
LB	8	Josh Forrest	So
LB	10	Tyler Brause	Jr
DB	15	Marcus McWilson	Fr
CB	16	Cody Quinn	So
S	17	Zack Blaylock	So
S	18	Glenn Faulkner	So
DB	19	Jaleel Hytchye	Fr
LB	20	Josh Harris	Fr
DB	21	Rodney Cox	So
LB	22	Khalid Henderson	So
DB	23	Nate Willis	Jr
DB	24	Blake McClain	Fr
CB	25	Cantrell McKinely	Jr
S	26	Tre Dunn	Sr
CB	27	Shawn Blaylock	Fr
CB	28	Eric Dixon	Jr
CB	30	Chris Davis	Fr
LB	32	Miles Simpson	Jr
S	34	Kory Brown	Jr
CB	38	Eric Simmons	Jr
LB	40	Avery Williamson	Sr
DE	41	Travaughn Paschal	Jr
DE	47	Jabari Johnson	Jr
LB	49	Robbie Irgang	Fr
DE	50	Mike Douglas	Jr
DT	51	Tristian Johnson	Sr
DT	52	Patrick Graffree	Fr
LB	54	Malcolm McDuffen	Jr
DT	60	Alvin Davis	Jr
DT	61	Jacob Hyde	Fr
DT	78	Zane Williams	Fr
DT	90	Melvin Lewis	Jr
DE	91	Farrington Huguenin	So
DT	92	Christian Coleman	Jr
DE	94	Za'Darius Smith	Jr
DE	95	Langston Newton	Fr
DT	96	Regie Meant	Fr
DT	97	Mister Cobble	Sr
DT	98	Thomas Chapman	So
DT	99	Donte Rumph	Sr

Special teams

Pos.	#	Name	Class
PK, P	9	Landon Foster	So
P	42	Jay Wilmott	So
LS	53	Matthew Adolph	Sr
LS	59	Kelly Mason	So
LS	81	Kyle Buddle	Jr
PK, P	88	Joe Mansour	Sr
PK	90	Tanner Blain	Fr
PK	99	Austin MacGinnis	Fr

Head coach

- Mark Stoops

Coordinators/assistant coaches

- Derrick Ansley
  Defensive backs
- Neal Brown
  Offensive coordinator/quarterbacks
- Jimmy Brumbaugh
  Defensive line
- D. J. Eliot
  Defensive coordinator/linebackers
- Tommy Mainord
  Wide receivers
- Vince Marrow
  Tight ends
- Bradley Dale Peveto
  Safeties/special teams coordinator
- John Schlarman
  Offensive line
- Chad Scott
  Running backs

Legend

- (C) Team captain
- (S) Suspended
- (I) Ineligible
- Injured
- Redshirt

Roster
Last update: April 29, 2012

=== Starters by game ===
Offense

Opponent \ Position	QB	RB	RB/WR	WR	WR	WR/TE	OT	OG	C	OG	OT
Western Kentucky	Whitlow	Sanders	Robinson	Collins	Blue	Aumiller	Miller	Eatmon-Nared	Myers	Mitchell	Swindle
Miami (OH)	M. Smith	Sanders	Warren	Badet	Blue	Aumiller	Miller	West	Toth	Mitchell	Swindle
Louisville	M. Smith	Sanders	Montgomery	Timmons	Blue	Aumiller	Miller	West	Toth	Mitchell	Swindle
Florida	Whitlow	Kemp	Sanders	Timmons	Blue	Badet	Miller	Godby	Toth	Mitchell	Swindle
South Carolina	Whitlow	Kemp	Robinson	Shields	Blue	Aumiller	Miller	Godby	Toth	Mitchell	Swindle
Alabama	Whitlow	Sanders	Robinson	Timmons	Blue	Aumiller	Miller	Godby	Toth	Mitchell	Swindle
Mississippi State	M. Smith	Sanders	Robinson	Timmons	Blue	Aumiller	Miller	Godby	Toth	Mitchell	Swindle
Alabama State	Witlow	Timmons	Badet	Robinson	Kendrick	Aumiller	Miller	West	Toth	Mitchell	Swindle
Missouri											
Vanderbilt											
Georgia											
Tennessee											

Defense

Opponent \ Position	DE	DT	DT	DE	LB	LB	LB	DB	DB	S	S
Western Kentucky	Dupree	Rumph	Cobble	Z. Smith	Henderson	Williamson	Brown	Willis	Tiller	Lowery	Dixon
Miami (OH)	Dupree	Rumph	Cobble	Z. Smith	Paschal	Williamson	McClain	Willis	Tiller	Lowery	Dixon
Louisville	Dupree	Rumph	Cobble	Z. Smith	Paschal	Williamson	McClain	Willis	Tiller	Lowery	Dixon
Florida	Dupree	Rumph	Cobble	Z. Smith	Paschal	Williamson	McClain	Quinn	Tiller	Lowery	Dixon
South Carolina	Dupree	Rumph	Cobble	Z. Smith	Paschal	Williamson	McClain	Quinn	Tiller	Lowery	Dixon
Alabama	Huguenin	Rumph	Cobble	Z. Smith	Henderson	Williamson	McClain	Willis	Quinn	Lowery	Dixon
Mississippi State	Dupree	Rumph	Cobble	Z. Smith	Henderson	Williamson	Paschal	McClain	Willis	Lowery	Quinn
Alabama State	Dupree	Rumph	Cobble	Z. Smith	Williamson	Henderson	McClain	Willis	Tiller	Lowery	Dixon
Missouri											
Vanderbilt											
Georgia											
Tennessee											
