= 2013 Vanderbilt Commodores football team =

American college football season

2013 Vanderbilt Commodores football

BBVA Compass Bowl champion

BBVA Compass Bowl, W 41–24 vs. Houston
- Conference: Southeastern Conference
- Eastern Division

Ranking
- Coaches: No. 23
- AP: No. 24
- Record: 9–4 (4–4 SEC)
- Head coach: James Franklin (3rd season)
- Offensive coordinator: John Donovan (3rd season)
- Offensive scheme: Multiple
- Defensive coordinator: Bob Shoop (3rd season)
- Co-defensive coordinator: Brent Pry (3rd season)
- Base defense: 4–3
- Captain: 9: Austyn Carta-Samuels; Wesley Johnson; Jordan Matthews; Walker May; Chase Garnham; Andre Hal; Javon Marshall; Carey Spear; Andrew East
- Home stadium: Vanderbilt Stadium

2013 Southeastern Conference football standings
	Conf.			Overall
Team	W		L	W		L
Eastern Division
No. 5 Missouri x	7	–	1	12	–	2
No. 4 South Carolina	6	–	2	11	–	2
Georgia	5	–	3	8	–	5
No. 24 Vanderbilt	4	–	4	9	–	4
Florida	3	–	5	4	–	8
Tennessee	2	–	6	5	–	7
Kentucky	0	–	8	2	–	10
Western Division
No. 2 Auburn xy$	7	–	1	12	–	2
No. 7 Alabama x%	7	–	1	11	–	2
No. 14 LSU *	5	–	3	10	–	3
No. 18 Texas A&M	4	–	4	9	–	4
Mississippi State	3	–	5	7	–	6
Ole Miss *	3	–	5	8	–	5
Arkansas	0	–	8	3	–	9
Championship: Auburn 59, Missouri 42
$ – BCS representative as conference champion; % – BCS at-large representative; x – Division champion/co-champions; y – Championship game participant; * LSU and Ole Miss vacated all wins (except for Ole Miss' Music City Bowl win) due to NCAA violations.; Rankings from AP Poll

The 2013 Vanderbilt Commodores football team represented Vanderbilt University during the 2013 NCAA Division I FBS football season. The Commodores played their seven home games at Vanderbilt Stadium at Dudley Field in Nashville, Tennessee, which has been Vanderbilt football's home stadium since 1922. The 2013 team was coming off back-to-back bowls for the first time in school history. The 2012 season was the best win percentage since 1955 (.692); the nine wins were the most since 1915, and the 5 SEC wins were the most since 1935. The 2013 team was headed by James Franklin who was in his 3rd and final year at Vanderbilt.

For the third straight year Vanderbilt had made it to a bowl game. Vandy defeated the Houston Cougars in the BBVA Compass Bowl 41–24. Vanderbilt finished with 9 wins in back to back seasons for the first time in school history. This was the last season the Commodores won a bowl game and finished with a winning record until the 2024 season.

== Before the season ==
A small amount of controversy occurred when Vanderbilt canceled games at home with Northwestern and away with Ohio State. Letters were sent cancelling the games, with the explicit reason being the need to accommodate Mizzou into Vanderbilt's SEC East Division. Northwestern, like Vanderbilt in the SEC, is the sole private institution in the Big 10, alleged that the real reason was fear on the part of Vanderbilt to continue playing its Big 10 counterpart—a series which had been referred to as the Battle of the Nerds.

=== Rape case ===
On August 9, 2013, four Vanderbilt football players were arrested and indicted for rape. Brandon Vandenburg, Cory Lamont Batey, Brandon E. Banks, and Jaborian "Tip" McKenzie were taken into custody and given a state-mandated HIV test in connection with the Vanderbilt rape case. All four men were charged with five counts of aggravated rape and two counts of aggravated sexual battery. They allegedly carried an unconscious 21-year-old female student into a dorm room in the school's Gilette House, and gang-raped and sodomized her on the floor in a 32-minute attack on June 23, 2013. They took graphic photos and videos of the rape. The victim (who is White) told the court that after Batey (who is Black) raped her, he urinated on her face while saying she deserved what he was doing to her because of the color of her skin, which sources reported was "That’s for 400 years of slavery you b----." The defendants were dismissed from the football team on June 29, 2013 and banned from campus during the six-week investigation that followed. A fifth player, Chris Boyd, pleaded guilty to criminal attempt to commit accessory after the fact and was dismissed from the team but not the university for his role in helping to cover up the rape. Three of the players were convicted, and received prison sentences ranging from 15 years, the minimum allowed by Tennessee law for their crimes, to 17 years. The fourth player accepted a plea deal which included 10 years' probation, and did not receive any jail time.

== Coaching staff ==
Name	Position	Year
James Franklin	Head coach	3rd
John Donovan	Offensive coordinator / running backs coach	3rd
Bob Shoop	Defensive coordinator / safeties coach	3rd
Charles Bankins	Special teams coordinator / tight ends coach	3rd
Josh Gattis	Wide receivers coach	2nd
Herb Hand	Run game coordinator / offensive line coach	4th
George Barlow	Defensive backs coach	2nd
Brent Pry	Co-defensive coordinator / linebackers coach	3rd
Ricky Rahne	Quarterbacks Coach	3rd
Sean Spencer	Defensive line coach	3rd
Andy Frank	Assistant director of football operations	5th
Jemal Griffin	Football Chief of Staff	3rd
Michael Hazel	Director of football operations	5th
Matt Ruland	Assistant Recruiting Coordinator	2nd
Joey Orck	Offensive Graduate Assistant	5th
Tom Bossung	Head Athletic Trainer	15th
Kevin Colon	Associate Director of student athletics	3rd
Dwight Galt	Football Strength and Conditioning Director	3rd
Chuck Losey	Football Assistant Strength Coach	3rd
Kevin Threlkel	Offensive Administrative Assistant	3rd
Luke Wyatt	Head equipment manager	31st

=== Recruiting ===
College recruiting (2013)
Name	Hometown	School	Height	Weight	Commit date
Zach Cunningham; LB	Pinson, AL	Pinson Valley High School	6 ft 4 in (1.93 m)	205 lb (93 kg)	Feb 6, 2013
Zach Cunningham; LB	Recruit ratings: Scout: Rivals: 247Sports: (84)				
Jordan Cunningham; WR	Fort Lauderdale, FL	University School of Nova Southeastern University	6 ft 1 in (1.85 m)	175 lb (79 kg)	Feb 6, 2013
Jordan Cunningham; WR	Recruit ratings: Scout: Rivals: 247Sports: (82)				
Brandon Vandenburg; TE	Indio, CA	College of the Desert	6 ft 5 in (1.96 m)	255 lb (116 kg)	Jan 20, 2013
Brandon Vandenburg; TE	Recruit ratings: Scout: Rivals: 247Sports: (83)				
Chad Kanoff; QB	Pacific Palisades, CA	Harvard-Westlake School	6 ft 3 in (1.91 m)	200 lb (91 kg)	May 28, 2012
Chad Kanoff; QB	Recruit ratings: Scout: Rivals: 247Sports: (82)				
Jay Woods; DT	Jackson, GA	Jackson High School	6 ft 2 in (1.88 m)	280 lb (130 kg)	Aug 16, 2012
Jay Woods; DT	Recruit ratings: Scout: Rivals: 247Sports: (83)				
Gerald Perry; WR	Memphis, TN	Whitehaven High School	5 ft 10 in (1.78 m)	165 lb (75 kg)	May 14, 2012
Gerald Perry; WR	Recruit ratings: Scout: Rivals: 247Sports: (76)				
Darrius Sims; DB	Memphis, TN	Whitehaven High School	5 ft 9 in (1.75 m)	175 lb (79 kg)	Jun 17, 2012
Darrius Sims; DB	Recruit ratings: Scout: Rivals: 247Sports: (76)				
Mitchell Parsons; TE	Parker, OH	College of the Desert	6 ft 4 in (1.93 m)	245 lb (111 kg)	Jan 21, 2013
Mitchell Parsons; TE	Recruit ratings: Scout: Rivals: 247Sports: (77)				
Taurean Ferguson; DB	Jonesboro, GA	Jonesboro High School	5 ft 9 in (1.75 m)	180 lb (82 kg)	Mar 31, 2012
Taurean Ferguson; DB	Recruit ratings: Scout: Rivals: 247Sports: (74)				
DeAndre Woods; WR	Clay, AL	Clay-Chalkville High School	6 ft 3 in (1.91 m)	208 lb (94 kg)	Oct 21, 2012
DeAndre Woods; WR	Recruit ratings: Scout: Rivals: 247Sports: (83)				
Delando Crooks; OL	Atlanta, GA	The New Schools at Carver	6 ft 5 in (1.96 m)	275 lb (125 kg)	Dec 15, 2012
Delando Crooks; OL	Recruit ratings: Scout: Rivals: 247Sports: (77)				
Nathan Marcus; TE	Glen Ellyn, IL	Glenbard West High School	6 ft 5 in (1.96 m)	220 lb (100 kg)	Apr 11, 2012
Nathan Marcus; TE	Recruit ratings: Scout: Rivals: 247Sports: (77)				
Jonathan Wynn; DE	Stone Mountain, GA	Stephenson High School	6 ft 4 in (1.93 m)	220 lb (100 kg)	Mar 27, 2012
Jonathan Wynn; DE	Recruit ratings: Scout: Rivals: 247Sports: (76)				
Mack Weaver; DE	Collierville, FL	Harding Academy	6 ft 5 in (1.96 m)	248 lb (112 kg)	Aug 22, 2012
Mack Weaver; DE	Recruit ratings: Scout: Rivals: 247Sports: (80)				
Ralph Webb; RB	Gainesville, FL	Gainesville High School	5 ft 10 in (1.78 m)	190 lb (86 kg)	Feb 2, 2013
Ralph Webb; RB	Recruit ratings: Scout: Rivals: 247Sports: (76)				
Latevius Rayford; WR	Memphis, TN	Central High School	6 ft 1 in (1.85 m)	180 lb (82 kg)	May 4, 2012
Latevius Rayford; WR	Recruit ratings: Scout: Rivals: 247Sports: (78)				
Jalen Banks; DB	Markham, IL	Thornton Township High School	5 ft 11 in (1.80 m)	188 lb (85 kg)	Oct 14, 2012
Jalen Banks; DB	Recruit ratings: Scout: Rivals: 247Sports: (77)				
Tre Bell; DB	Union, NJ	St. Peter's Preparatory School	5 ft 11 in (1.80 m)	170 lb (77 kg)	Aug 10, 2012
Tre Bell; DB	Recruit ratings: Scout: Rivals: 247Sports: (82)				
Nigel Bowden; LB	Macon, GA	Central High School	6 ft 1 in (1.85 m)	245 lb (111 kg)	Jun 17, 2012
Nigel Bowden; LB	Recruit ratings: Scout: Rivals: 247Sports: (77)				
Landon Stokes; DE	Orlando, FL	Lake Highland Preparatory School	6 ft 4 in (1.93 m)	220 lb (100 kg)	Jun 26, 2012
Landon Stokes; DE	Recruit ratings: Scout: Rivals: 247Sports: (80)				
Oren Burks; LB	Fairfax Station, VA	South County Secondary School	6 ft 3 in (1.91 m)	200 lb (91 kg)	Aug 11, 2012
Oren Burks; LB	Recruit ratings: Scout: Rivals: 247Sports: (79)				
Ryan White; DB	Louisville, KY	Trinity High School	5 ft 10 in (1.78 m)	188 lb (85 kg)	Jul 31, 2012
Ryan White; DB	Recruit ratings: Scout: Rivals: 247Sports: (80)				
Carlos Burse; WR	Alpharetta, GA	Alpharetta High School	6 ft 2 in (1.88 m)	200 lb (91 kg)	Jun 14, 2012
Carlos Burse; WR	Recruit ratings: Scout: Rivals: 247Sports: (82)				
Tommy Openshaw; K/P	Jacksonville, FL	Creekside High School	6 ft 2 in (1.88 m)	175 lb (79 kg)	Oct 31, 2012
Tommy Openshaw; K/P	Recruit ratings: Scout: 247Sports:				
Sean Dowling; OL	Fallbrook, CA	Fallbrook Union High School	6 ft 6 in (1.98 m)	270 lb (120 kg)	Dec 22, 2012
Sean Dowling; OL	Recruit ratings: Scout: Rivals: 247Sports: (77)				
Johnny McCrary; QB	Decatur, GA	Cedar Grove High School	6 ft 3 in (1.91 m)	200 lb (91 kg)	Feb 16, 2012
Johnny McCrary; QB	Recruit ratings: Scout: Rivals: 247Sports: (82)				
Overall recruit ranking: Scout: 19 Rivals: 19 247Sports: 19 ESPN: 22
Note: In many cases, Scout, Rivals, 247Sports, On3, and ESPN may conflict in their listings of height and weight.; In these cases, the average was taken. ESPN grades are on a 100-point scale.; Sources: "2013 Team Ranking". Rivals.com.

== Schedule ==
Date	Time	Opponent	Site	TV	Result	Attendance
August 29	8:15 p.m.	Ole Miss	Vanderbilt Stadium; Nashville, TN (rivalry)	ESPN	L 35–39	40,350
September 7	6:30 p.m.	Austin Peay*	Vanderbilt Stadium; Nashville, TN	CSS	W 38–3	33,162
September 14	6:00 p.m.	at No. 13 South Carolina	Williams-Brice Stadium; Columbia, SC	ESPN	L 25–35	81,371
September 21	11:00 a.m.	at UMass*	Gillette Stadium; Foxborough, MA	ESPNews	W 24–7	16,419
September 28	6:30 p.m.	UAB*	Vanderbilt Stadium; Nashville, TN	ESPN3	W 52–24	32,467
October 5	6:30 p.m.	Missouri^{†}	Vanderbilt Stadium; Nashville, TN	CSS	L 28–51	36,892
October 19	11:00 a.m.	No. 15 Georgia	Vanderbilt Stadium; Nashville, TN (rivalry)	CBS	W 31–27	40,350
October 26	11:21 a.m.	at No. 14 Texas A&M	Kyle Field; College Station, TX	SECTV	L 24–56	86,584
November 9	11:00 a.m.	at Florida	Ben Hill Griffin Stadium; Gainesville, FL	SECRN	W 34–17	88,004
November 16	11:21 a.m.	Kentucky	Vanderbilt Stadium; Nashville, TN (rivalry)	SECTV	W 22–6	33,488
November 23	6:00 p.m.	at Tennessee	Neyland Stadium; Knoxville, TN (rivalry)	ESPN2	W 14–10	97,223
November 30	11:21 a.m.	Wake Forest*	Vanderbilt Stadium; Nashville, TN	SECTV	W 23–21	33,019
January 4, 2014	12:00 p.m.	vs. Houston*	Legion Field; Birmingham, AL (BBVA Compass Bowl)	ESPN	W 41–24	42,717
*Non-conference game; ^{†}Homecoming; Rankings from AP Poll released prior to the game; All times are in Central time

== Rankings ==
Ranking movements Legend: ██ Increase in ranking ██ Decrease in ranking — = Not ranked RV = Received votes
	Week																
Poll	Pre	1	2	3	4	5	6	7	8	9	10	11	12	13	14	15	Final
AP	RV	—	—	—	—	—	—	—	—	—	—	—	—	RV	RV	RV	24
Coaches	RV	—	—	—	—	—	—	—	—	—	—	—	—	RV	RV	RV	23
Harris	Not released							—	—	—	—	—	—	—	—	—	Not released
BCS	Not released								—	—	—	—	—	—	—	—	Not released

== Game summaries ==
=== Ole Miss ===
	1	2	3	4	Total
Rebels	10	0	15	14	39
Commodores	0	21	7	7	35

Statistics	MISS	VAN
First downs	28	19
Total yards	489	426
Rushing yards	206	126
Passing yards	283	300
Turnovers	0	2
Time of possession	30:46	29:14

Team	Category	Player	Statistics
Ole Miss	Passing	Bo Wallace	31/47, 283 yards
Ole Miss	Rushing	Jeff Scott	12 rushes, 138 yards, TD
Ole Miss	Receiving	Laquon Treadwell	9 receptions, 82 yards
Vanderbilt	Passing	Austyn Carta-Samuels	21/36, 300 yards, 2 TD, 2 INT
Vanderbilt	Rushing	Jerron Seymour	5 rushes, 43 yards, TD
Vanderbilt	Receiving	Jordan Matthews	10 receptions, 178 yards, TD

=== Austin Peay ===
	1	2	3	4	Total
Governors	0	0	3	0	3
Commodores	3	35	0	0	38

Statistics	PEAY	VAN
First downs	6	21
Total yards	139	442
Rushing yards	85	169
Passing yards	54	273
Turnovers	1	1
Time of possession	30:47	29:13

Team	Category	Player	Statistics
Austin Peay	Passing	Andrew Spivey	7/11, 37 yards
Austin Peay	Rushing	Tim Phillips	9 rushes, 67 yards
Austin Peay	Receiving	Ladarius Chatman	3 receptions, 19 yards
Vanderbilt	Passing	Austyn Carta-Samuels	14/22, 223 yards, TD
Vanderbilt	Rushing	Jerron Seymour	9 rushes, 41 yards, TD
Vanderbilt	Receiving	Jordan Matthews	6 receptions, 111 yards, TD

=== At No. 13 South Carolina ===
	1	2	3	4	Total
Commodores	0	10	0	15	25
No. 13 Gamecocks	21	7	7	0	35

Statistics	VAN	SC
First downs	14	31
Total yards	268	579
Rushing yards	121	220
Passing yards	147	359
Turnovers	2	3
Time of possession	22:50	37:10

Team	Category	Player	Statistics
Vanderbilt	Passing	Austyn Carta-Samuels	12/22, 147 yards, TD, INT
Vanderbilt	Rushing	Wesley Tate	10 rushes, 71 yards
Vanderbilt	Receiving	Jordan Matthews	8 receptions, 106 yards
South Carolina	Passing	Connor Shaw	21/29, 284 yards, 3 TD
South Carolina	Rushing	Connor Shaw	19 rushes, 84 yards
South Carolina	Receiving	Bruce Ellington	8 receptions, 111 yards, TD

=== At UMass ===
	1	2	3	4	Total
Commodores	7	3	0	14	24
Minutemen	0	7	0	0	7

Statistics	VAN	MASS
First downs	23	17
Total yards	406	248
Rushing yards	166	99
Passing yards	240	149
Turnovers	2	1
Time of possession	32:19	27:41

Team	Category	Player	Statistics
Vanderbilt	Passing	Austyn Carta-Samuels	18/27, 219 yards, 2 TD, INT
Vanderbilt	Rushing	Wesley Tate	14 rushes, 64 yards
Vanderbilt	Receiving	Jonathan Krause	6 receptions, 105 yards, TD
UMass	Passing	A. J. Doyle	20/28, 133 yards, TD
UMass	Rushing	A. J. Doyle	8 rushes, 29 yards
UMass	Receiving	Tajae Sharpe	7 receptions, 45 yards, TD

=== UAB ===
	1	2	3	4	Total
Blazers	3	3	3	15	24
Commodores	7	17	7	21	52

Statistics	UAB	VAN
First downs	17	23
Total yards	362	540
Rushing yards	156	206
Passing yards	206	334
Turnovers	2	1
Time of possession	30:31	29:29

Team	Category	Player	Statistics
UAB	Passing	Jonathan Perry	9/16, 155 yards, 2 TD, INT
UAB	Rushing	Jordan Howard	9 rushes, 92 yards
UAB	Receiving	J. J. Nelson	5 receptions, 69 yards
Vanderbilt	Passing	Austyn Carta-Samuels	23/29, 334 yards, 2 TD, INT
Vanderbilt	Rushing	Jerron Seymour	12 rushes, 107 yards, 2 TD
Vanderbilt	Receiving	Jordan Matthews	8 receptions, 115 yards, TD

=== Missouri ===
	1	2	3	4	Total
Tigers	20	10	14	7	51
Commodores	0	7	14	7	28

Statistics	MIZ	VAN
First downs	29	27
Total yards	523	468
Rushing yards	245	130
Passing yards	278	338
Turnovers	0	1
Time of possession	29:58	30:02

Team	Category	Player	Statistics
Missouri	Passing	James Franklin	19/28, 278 yards, 4 TD
Missouri	Rushing	Henry Josey	14 rushes, 69 yards, 2 TD
Missouri	Receiving	L'Damian Washington	3 receptions, 86 yards, 2 TD
Vanderbilt	Passing	Austyn Carta-Samuels	29/41, 338 yards, 2 TD, INT
Vanderbilt	Rushing	Jerron Seymour	12 rushes, 65 yards
Vanderbilt	Receiving	Jordan Matthews	7 receptions, 123 yards, TD

=== No. 15 Georgia ===
	1	2	3	4	Total
No. 15 Bulldogs	10	14	3	0	27
Commodores	7	7	0	17	31

Statistics	UGA	VAN
First downs	16	21
Total yards	221	337
Rushing yards	107	119
Passing yards	114	218
Turnovers	3	2
Time of possession	31:05	28:55

Team	Category	Player	Statistics
Georgia	Passing	Aaron Murray	16/28, 114 yards, INT
Georgia	Rushing	Brendan Douglas	17 rushes, 84 yards
Georgia	Receiving	Chris Conley	5 receptions, 40 yards
Vanderbilt	Passing	Austyn Carta-Samuels	12/20, 111 yards, INT
Vanderbilt	Rushing	Jerron Seymour	19 rushes, 75 yards, 2 TD
Vanderbilt	Receiving	Jonathan Krause	5 receptions, 89 yards

=== At No. 14 Texas A&M ===
	1	2	3	4	Total
Commodores	0	17	0	7	24
No. 14 Aggies	21	7	21	7	56

Statistics	VAN	TAMU
First downs	19	28
Total yards	329	558
Rushing yards	95	182
Passing yards	234	376
Turnovers	3	5
Time of possession	35:07	24:53

Team	Category	Player	Statistics
Vanderbilt	Passing	Patton Robinette	15/28, 216 yards, TD, 2 INT
Vanderbilt	Rushing	Jerron Seymour	16 rushes, 53 yards, TD
Vanderbilt	Receiving	Jordan Matthews	8 receptions, 92 yards
Texas A&M	Passing	Johnny Manziel	25/35, 305 yards, 4 TD, INT
Texas A&M	Rushing	Trey Williams	6 rushes, 65 yards, TD
Texas A&M	Receiving	Malcome Kennedy	8 receptions, 83 yards

=== At Florida ===
	1	2	3	4	Total
Commodores	10	7	7	10	34
Gators	0	3	7	7	17

Statistics	VAN	FLA
First downs	12	26
Total yards	183	344
Rushing yards	126	39
Passing yards	57	305
Turnovers	0	4
Time of possession	29:00	31:00

Team	Category	Player	Statistics
Vanderbilt	Passing	Patton Robinette	6/12, 57 yards
Vanderbilt	Rushing	Jerron Seymour	24 rushes, 62 yards, 3 TD
Vanderbilt	Receiving	Jordan Matthews	5 receptions, 45 yards
Florida	Passing	Tyler Murphy	30/46, 305 yards, TD, 3 INT
Florida	Rushing	Kelvin Taylor	14 rushes, 47 yards, TD
Florida	Receiving	Quinton Dunbar	6 receptions, 77 yards

=== Kentucky ===
	1	2	3	4	Total
Wildcats	6	0	0	0	6
Commodores	9	0	0	13	22

Statistics	UK	VAN
First downs	17	14
Total yards	262	313
Rushing yards	142	116
Passing yards	120	197
Turnovers	4	0
Time of possession	27:28	32:32

Team	Category	Player	Statistics
Kentucky	Passing	Jalen Whitlow	14/28, 120 yards, 4 INT
Kentucky	Rushing	Jalen Whitlow	17 rushes, 69 yards
Kentucky	Receiving	Demarco Robinson	4 receptions, 49 yards
Vanderbilt	Passing	Austyn Carta-Samuels	19/24, 184 yards
Vanderbilt	Rushing	Jerron Seymour	21 rushes, 77 yards
Vanderbilt	Receiving	Jordan Matthews	12 receptions, 141 yards

=== At Tennessee ===
	1	2	3	4	Total
Commodores	7	0	0	7	14
Volunteers	0	7	3	0	10

Statistics	VAN	TENN
First downs	15	18
Total yards	285	237
Rushing yards	90	184
Passing yards	195	53
Turnovers	4	3
Time of possession	31:45	28:15

Team	Category	Player	Statistics
Vanderbilt	Passing	Austyn Carta-Samuels	21/27, 181 yards, INT
Vanderbilt	Rushing	Patton Robinette	10 rushes, 41 yards, TD
Vanderbilt	Receiving	Jordan Matthews	13 receptions, 133 yards
Tennessee	Passing	Joshua Dobbs	11/19, 53 yards, 2 INT
Tennessee	Rushing	Rajion Neal	22 rushes, 95 yards, TD
Tennessee	Receiving	Alton Howard	2 receptions, 23 yards

=== Wake Forest ===
	1	2	3	4	Total
Demon Deacons	7	7	7	0	21
Commodores	7	10	0	6	23

Statistics	WAKE	VAN
First downs	15	22
Total yards	266	403
Rushing yards	111	132
Passing yards	155	271
Turnovers	1	2
Time of possession	21:51	38:09

Team	Category	Player	Statistics
Wake Forest	Passing	Tanner Price	16/32, 155 yards, INT
Wake Forest	Rushing	Tanner Price	12 rushes, 47 yards, TD
Wake Forest	Receiving	Josh Harris	3 receptions, 40 yards
Vanderbilt	Passing	Austyn Carta-Samuels	24/33, 231 yards, TD, INT
Vanderbilt	Rushing	Brian Kimbrow	13 rushes, 45 yards
Vanderbilt	Receiving	Jordan Matthews	11 receptions, 125 yards

=== Vs. Houston (BBVA Compass Bowl) ===
	1	2	3	4	Total
Commodores	14	10	0	17	41
Cougars	0	0	24	0	24

Statistics	VAN	HOU
First downs	14	12
Total yards	365	384
Rushing yards	211	146
Passing yards	154	238
Turnovers	3	3
Time of possession	35:41	24:19

Team	Category	Player	Statistics
Vanderbilt	Passing	Paul Robinette	6/19, 154 yards, 2 TD, 2 INT
Vanderbilt	Rushing	Jerron Seymour	20 rushes, 89 yards, TD
Vanderbilt	Receiving	Jordan Matthews	5 receptions, 143 yards, 2 TD
Houston	Passing	John O'Korn	20/47, 228 yards, 2 TD, 2 INT
Houston	Rushing	Daniel Spencer	3 rushes, 69 yards
Houston	Receiving	Markeith Ambles	6 receptions, 105 yards, TD
