= James Franklin (American football coach) =

American football player and coach (born 1972)

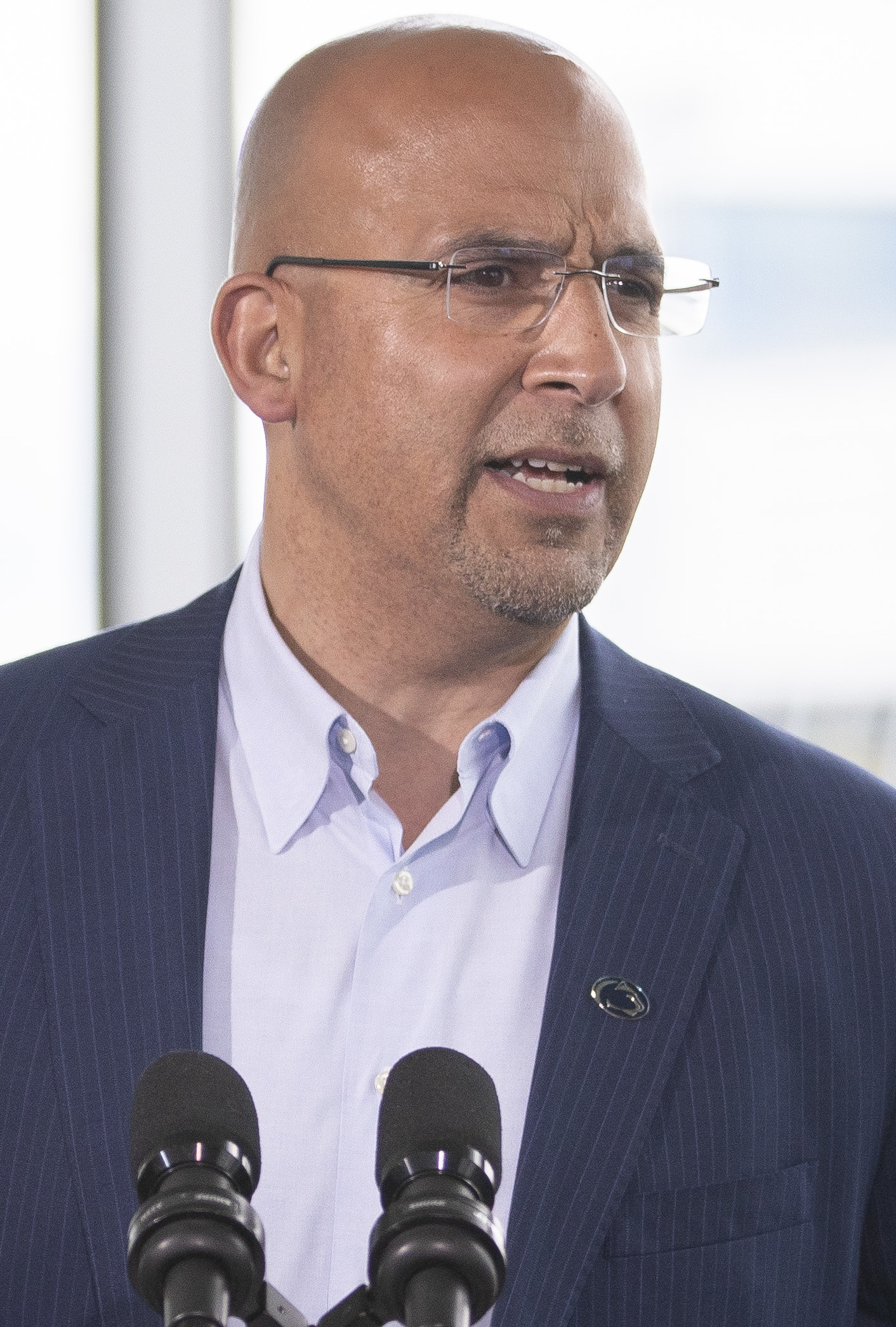
- Franklin in 2021 with Penn State

Current position
- Title: Head coach
- Team: Virginia Tech
- Conference: ACC
- Record: 6–5

Biographical details
- Born: February 2, 1972 (age 54); Langhorne, Pennsylvania, U.S.

Playing career
- 1991–1994: East Stroudsburg
- Position: Quarterback

Coaching career (HC unless noted)
- 1995: Kutztown (WR)
- 1996: East Stroudsburg (DB)
- 1996: Roskilde Kings (OC)
- 1997: James Madison (WR)
- 1998: Washington State (TE)
- 1999: Idaho State (WR)
- 2000–2004: Maryland (WR/RC)
- 2005: Green Bay Packers (WR)
- 2006–2007: Kansas State (OC/QB)
- 2008–2010: Maryland (AHC/OC/QB)
- 2011–2013: Vanderbilt
- 2014–2025: Penn State
- 2026–present: Virginia Tech

Head coaching record
- Overall: 134–65
- Bowls: 8–7
- Tournaments: 2–1 (CFP)

Accomplishments and honors

Championships
- 1 Big Ten (2016); 1 Big Ten East Division (2016)

Awards
- Hayes–Schembechler Coach of the Year (2016); Sporting News Coach of the Year (2016); Woody Hayes Trophy (2016)

James Geoffrey Franklin (born February 2, 1972) is an American college football coach who is the head football coach at Virginia Tech. He previously served as the head football coach at Vanderbilt University from 2011 to 2013 and at Pennsylvania State University from 2014 until 2025.

== Early life and education ==
James Geoffrey Franklin was born in Langhorne, Pennsylvania, on February 2, 1972, to James Oliver and Jocelyn "Josie" Franklin.

He attended Neshaminy High School in Langhorne, and then attended East Stroudsburg University of Pennsylvania, where he played as a quarterback all four years. In that position, he set seven school records and was a Division II player of the year nominee in 1994. Sports Illustrated named him a "National Player of the Week" that season. In 1995, he graduated with a Bachelor of Science degree in psychology. Franklin was a member of Phi Sigma Kappa fraternity while at East Stroudsburg.

== Coaching career ==
Franklin began his coaching career in 1995, coaching wide receivers at Kutztown University of Pennsylvania. The following season, he took over as the coach of the defensive secondary for his alma mater, East Stroudsburg. That year, he was also the offensive coordinator for the Roskilde Kings of the Danish American Football Federation. In 1997, he became wide receivers coach at James Madison, and, the following year, became tight ends coach at Washington State. Franklin completed a master's degree in educational leadership at Washington State in 1999.

In 1999, he served as wide receivers coach at Idaho State. That year, the Bengals recorded 29 touchdowns, 258 receptions, and in excess of 3,300 passing yards for one of the best statistical seasons in school history. Idaho State ranked ninth nationally in total offense that year.

Franklin has also held internships at several National Football League (NFL) franchises, including the Miami Dolphins, Philadelphia Eagles, and Minnesota Vikings.

=== Maryland ===
Franklin first served at the University of Maryland as the wide receivers coach starting in 2000. In November 2000, head coach Ron Vanderlinden was dismissed and replaced by Ralph Friedgen, a Maryland alum and former Georgia Tech offensive coordinator. Friedgen retained Franklin as the wide receivers coach, one of only two assistants to be kept on the new coaching staff (running backs coach Mike Locksley was the other).

In 2003, Franklin's duties expanded to include the position of recruiting coordinator. Since then, he has been considered a top recruiter. His geographic areas of concentration for recruiting were Baltimore, Prince George's County, Maryland, Charles County, Maryland, and public schools in Washington, D.C. In 2005, Franklin departed Maryland to serve as the wide receivers coach for the Green Bay Packers of the NFL.

In 2008, Franklin returned to Maryland as the offensive coordinator, assistant head coach, and head coach in waiting. Shortly before coach Ralph Friedgen was fired in December 2010, Franklin accepted the head coach position at Vanderbilt.

=== Kansas State ===
Franklin served at Kansas State University as the quarterbacks coach and offensive coordinator for the 2006 and 2007 seasons. He joined head coach Ron Prince as the first coaching staff to follow the legendary Bill Snyder. During his tenure at K-State, Franklin nurtured record setting offensive talent, including the future NFL starters quarterback Josh Freeman and All-America wide receiver Jordy Nelson. Despite impressive wins over a top 5 team and an appearance in the inaugural Texas Bowl, the Wildcat program was a far cry from the title contending teams fielded during the Snyder era. Franklin left the Wildcat coaching staff prior to Ron Prince's 2008 dismissal, and subsequent return of Coach Bill Snyder.

=== Vanderbilt ===
Vanderbilt considered Franklin a candidate for its head coaching position vacated with the forced resignation of interim coach Robbie Caldwell after the 2010 season. The Washington Post reported other candidates for the job were Al Golden of Temple and Larry Coker of UTSA (and formerly Miami), and that Franklin was not the frontrunner. After Auburn offensive coordinator Gus Malzahn turned down the job, Vanderbilt began talks to hire Franklin as its head coach. On December 17, Vanderbilt announced Franklin had been hired as head coach. Franklin was the first African American to be head coach of a major sport at Vanderbilt, and the third to be a head football coach in the Southeastern Conference (after Sylvester Croom, formerly at Mississippi State, and former Kentucky head coach Joker Phillips).

Franklin led Vanderbilt to a bowl game in all three of his seasons as head coach, a team that had never previously participated in a bowl game in consecutive seasons, making him the only football coach in program history to do so.

==== 2011 season ====
Franklin finished the 2011 regular season with an overall record of 6–6 and a mark of 2–6 in conference play, finishing in a tie with Kentucky for fourth place in the SEC East. They were invited to the Liberty Bowl where they were defeated by Cincinnati 31–24 to finish the season 6–7 in 2011. The 2011 seniors for the Vanderbilt football team became the first class in program history to qualify for two bowl games while at the school. Vanderbilt had only been to four bowl games in school history. After starting the season with three wins and then three losses, the third to Georgia in a close game (33–28) that proved they could be competitive. The last three regular season losses were close games — to No. 8 Arkansas 31–28, at Florida 26–21, and at Tennessee in overtime 27–21. They then lost their bowl game to Cincinnati, 31–24. The team's only losses by more than seven points were at No. 12 South Carolina 21–3 and at No. 2 Alabama 34–0. Vanderbilt's six wins were by an average margin of 24 points. Even with a losing record, the 2011 team outscored its opponents 347 to 281.

==== 2012 season ====
In his second season (2012), the Commodores finished 9–4 and ranked in both the Associated Press and USA Today end-of-season coaches' top 25 for the first time since 1948 (and the first ranking in any week since 2008). It was only the third nine-win season in school history, also was the first time since 1935 that Vandy won five SEC games in a year and the first time in 30 years that they won at home against Tennessee.

The 2012 team had numerous milestones. The longest road winning streak (4) since 1950. Longest win streak (7) since 1948. Most times scoring 40 (5) or more points since 1915. First Vandy player Zac Stacy to rush for over 3,000 yards in career, the first time since 1949 to 1951 that Vanderbilt beat rival Ole Miss in consecutive years. Jordan Matthews set a single-season record with 1,262 yards receiving. Kicker Carey Spear scored a school record 81 points. Largest margin of victory over rival Tennessee (23) 41–18 since 1954 (26–0). Largest margin of victory against secondary rival Kentucky (40) since 1916, when Vanderbilt won 45–0. First time a Vanderbilt team went to a bowl in back-to-back years. First win at home vs. Tennessee in 30 years. First 8-win season since 1982. Longest rush from scrimmage — 90 yards by Zac Stacy. First winning record in the regular season since 1982. Four straight wins in SEC play for the first time since 1949. The first time in Vanderbilt history a player (Zac Stacy) had rushed for over 1,000 yards back to back years. The first 9 win season since 1915.

Franklin, convinced of the strength of Southeastern Conference football, ranked three SEC teams — Alabama, Georgia, and Florida — ahead of the consensus Number 1 Notre Dame in the final regular-season coaches poll for 2012.

==== 2013 season ====
For the third straight year, Vanderbilt made it to a bowl game. Vandy defeated Houston Cougars in the BBVA Compass Bowl 41–24. Vanderbilt finished with nine wins in consecutive years for the first time in school history, and was also ranked in the top 25 of AP and Coaches polls in back-to-back years for the first time.

Four Vanderbilt football players were arrested on August 9, 2013, and charged with five counts of aggravated rape and two counts of aggravated sexual battery. They took graphic photos and videos of the rape. BuzzFeed reported that Franklin encouraged a player to delete graphic footage of the rape after viewing it. Franklin denied the accusation. In court testimony, Franklin admitted to changing his story about whether he told Vanderbilt players that he had viewed a video recording of the incident.

A minor controversy occurred when Vanderbilt canceled games at home with Northwestern and away games with Ohio State. A letter was sent cancelling the games, the explicit reason being the need to accommodate Mizzou into Vanderbilt's SEC East Division. Northwestern, the sole private institution in the Big Ten, like Vanderbilt in the SEC, alleged that the real reason was fear on the part of Vanderbilt to continue playing its Big Ten counterpart—a series which had been referred to as the Battle of the Nerds.

Additionally, Vanderbilt's 25 combined wins in Franklin's three years in charge was the Commodores' highest total in school history. Franklin finished his Vanderbilt career with a record of 24–15 (an average of 8 wins per year).

=== Penn State ===
On January 11, 2014, the Athletic Department at Penn State announced the appointment of Franklin as the head football coach of the Penn State Nittany Lions. Penn State agreed to pay $1.5 million that Franklin owed Vanderbilt for early termination of his contract, Penn State disclosed this information January 24, 2014, according to USA TODAY Sports. He received a six-year contract, which paid him $4.3 million for the 2014 season, including a $300,000 retention bonus payable if he was Penn State's coach on December 31, 2014. He had an annual guaranteed pay increase of $100,000 along with retention bonuses, plus performance incentives each year. During his first few press conferences, he had said how he wanted Penn State to again be the most dominant school in recruiting in Pennsylvania.

Announcing Franklin's hire, 5 months after the arrest of four Vanderbilt football players for gang rape and while sanctions resulting from the Jerry Sandusky child sex abuse scandal were still in effect, required extreme vetting by replacement administrators at Penn State. President Rodney Erickson and Director of Athletics Dave Joyner applied a deep background search and intense interviewing to protect all stakeholders from further harm.

==== 2014 season ====
In his first season with the Nittany Lions, Franklin led the team to a 6–6 regular season record. The season ended with a 31–30 victory over Boston College in the Pinstripe Bowl.

==== 2015 season ====
Franklin led the Nittany Lions' to a 7–5 regular season record. The season ended with a 24–17 loss to Georgia in the TaxSlayer Bowl.

==== 2016 season ====
Penn State started the 2016 season 2–2, but Franklin rallied his team to win the next eight games, winning the Big Ten's East Division, followed by a victory over Wisconsin in the 2016 Big Ten Football Championship Game. For his team's turnaround, Franklin was named the Dave McClain Coach of the Year in the Big Ten.

On August 18, 2017, Penn State announced that Franklin signed a six-year contract extension worth $5.738 million a year. That deal includes retention bonuses paid at the end of each year of the contract.

"My family and I are very thankful to be a part of the Penn State community," Franklin said in a statement. "I am pleased with the progress our program has made in the community, in the classroom and on the field. I look forward to diligently working with President Barron and Director of Athletics Sandy Barbour on implementing a plan that puts our University and our student-athletes in the best position to compete on the field and in life."

Penn State announced Franklin will make $4.3 million during the 2017 season as part of a contract that will escalate each year through the 2022 season, in which he will make $6.3 million. He has a $2 million buyout for the 2017 season and a $1 million buyout for every subsequent year.

In addition to the guaranteed money, Franklin's contract has incentives including $800,000 for a national title, $400,000 for a College Football Playoff appearance and $350,000 for winning the Big Ten Championship Game. His incentives are capped at $1 million per year.

==== 2017 season ====
In 2017, Franklin led the Nittany Lions to another 10–2 regular season, 7–2 in Big Ten games. They ended the season by defeating the Washington Huskies in the 2017 Fiesta Bowl, 35–28. Penn State finished the season 11–2, ranked #8 in both the AP and Coaches Poll.

==== 2018 season ====
Prior to the 2018 season, Penn State lost several key contributors from the previous seasons. Offensive coordinator Joe Moorhead left to become the head coach at Mississippi State, star Running Back Saquon Barkley was drafted as the 2nd overall draft pick by the New York Giants, and Tight End Mike Gesicki was drafted by the Miami Dolphins. The Nittany Lions took a step back from their recent success, finishing their regular season 9–3 overall and 6–3 in conference games. Following the regular season they played Kentucky in the Citrus Bowl, losing 27–24. Penn State finished the season 9–4, ranked #17 in the AP and Coaches Poll.

==== 2019 season ====
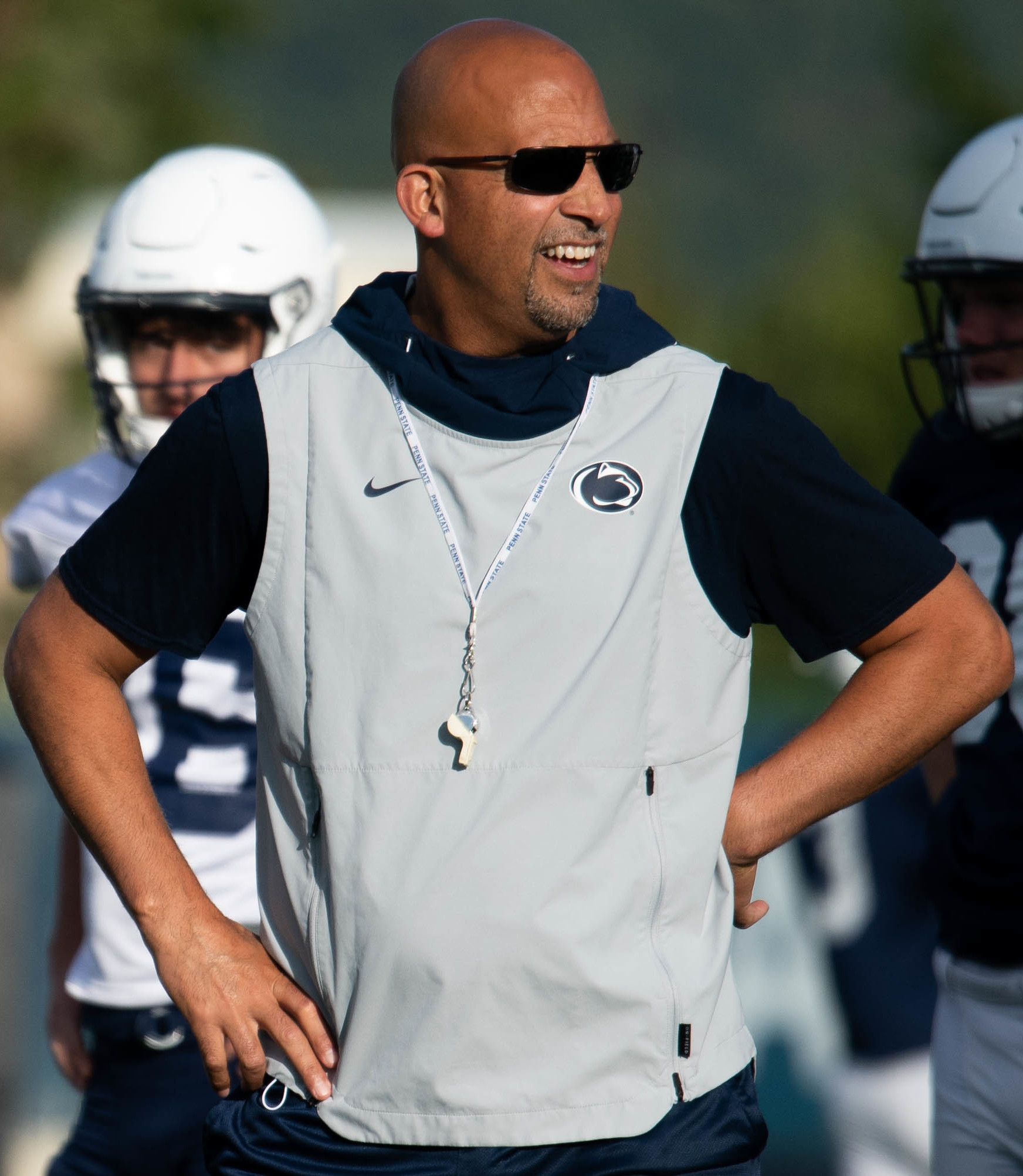
Franklin with Penn State in 2019

The Nittany Lions finished the 2019 season 11–2, and had a conference record of 7–2. They received an invitation to the 2019 Cotton Bowl Classic where they defeated the #17 2019 Memphis Tigers 53–39. Penn State finished the 2019 season ranked #9 in both the AP Poll and Coaches Poll.

Penn State announced at the end of the 2019 regular season that the board of trustees had confirmed unanimous approval of an extension of James Franklin contract after rumored interest from several other programs, including the USC Trojans and Florida State Seminoles.

==== 2020 season ====
Penn State's 2020 season was shortened because of the COVID-19 pandemic. Penn State got off to their worst start in school history in 2020, starting 0–5. They were able to rebound, however, by winning their last four games after that to finish 4–5. The season was scarred early on by the sudden retirement of starting running back Journey Brown due to a heart disease.

==== 2021 season ====
Penn State finished the regular season 7–5, and 4–5 in Big Ten play. The Nittany Lions, started the season off with a 5–0 record and with wins over #12 Wisconsin and #22 Auburn were ranked as high as #4 in the country. However, after an injury sustained by quarterback Sean Clifford, the team struggled towards the end of the season, winning just two out of their final seven games. Prior to the regular-season finale against Michigan State, Franklin agreed to a 10-year, $75 million extension to remain as Penn State's head football coach through the 2031 season. The team was invited to the Outback Bowl and a matchup with Arkansas, the first ever meeting between the two schools. The Nittany Lions were defeated by a score of 24–10 to finish the season 7–6.

==== 2022 season ====
Despite losing impact players such as Jahan Dotson, Arnold Ebiketie, and Jaquan Brisker to the NFL Draft, the Nittany Lions rebounded going 10–2, only losing to top 4 ranked Michigan and Ohio State. Their performance secured the team a place in the Rose Bowl, where they would beat Utah to win their first Rose Bowl since 1995, ending the season 11–2. This marked Coach James Franklin's third New Year's Six win with the Nittany Lions, and his first Rose Bowl win.

==== 2023 season ====
Penn State started the 2023 season ranked 7th in the AP Poll. Franklin and the Nittany Lions started off 6–0 before an undefeated matchup against #3 Ohio State. Ohio State won 20–12 to give the Nittany Lions their first loss. Penn State won four of their next five, with the lone loss coming to #2 Michigan. Penn State qualified for the Peach Bowl, where they lost 38–25 to Ole Miss to finish 10–3.

==== 2024 season ====
During the 2024 season, Penn State went 11–1 in the regular season, with their only loss coming to the Ohio State Buckeyes by a score of 20–13 in their eighth game. Penn State qualified for the Big Ten Championship Game, but lost 45–37 to the Oregon Ducks. Despite this, Penn State qualified for the College Football Playoff for the first time in program history as the sixth seed. In the playoff, Penn State won two games, beating the SMU Mustangs by a score of 38–10 in the first round and beating Boise State Broncos in the Fiesta Bowl (a quarterfinal game) by a score of 31–14. In the semifinal round, the Nittany Lions lost to the Notre Dame Fighting Irish in the Orange Bowl by a score of 27–24, marking their 13th consecutive loss to an AP top-five opponent.

==== 2025 season ====
Penn State entered the 2025 season with high expectations coming off its run to the College Football Playoff semifinal and with several key players returning. The Nittany Lions were ranked #2 on the preseason AP Poll and were picked to win the Big Ten Conference in the preseason media poll. Despite starting 3–0, the team struggled offensively and eventually suffered a double overtime loss to #6 Oregon at home in the White Out game. In the next two weeks, Penn State would go on to lose 42–37 against a previously winless UCLA, and 22–21 at home to Northwestern, bringing their record to 3–3 on the season. On October 12, one day after the Northwestern loss, Franklin was fired after 12 seasons at Penn State. He finished his tenure at Penn State with a 104–45 overall record.

Franklin was credited at Penn State for bringing the program to national prominence for the first time since the Jerry Sandusky scandal, along with delivering the program six 10-win seasons and a Big Ten Championship in 2016. However, Franklin had garnered frequent criticism for his record of 4–21 (.160) in games against AP top-10 teams (the third-lowest winning percentage for a coach all-time in a 25-game minimum), along with a 3–7 and 1–10 record against conference rivals Michigan and Ohio State, respectively.

=== Virginia Tech ===
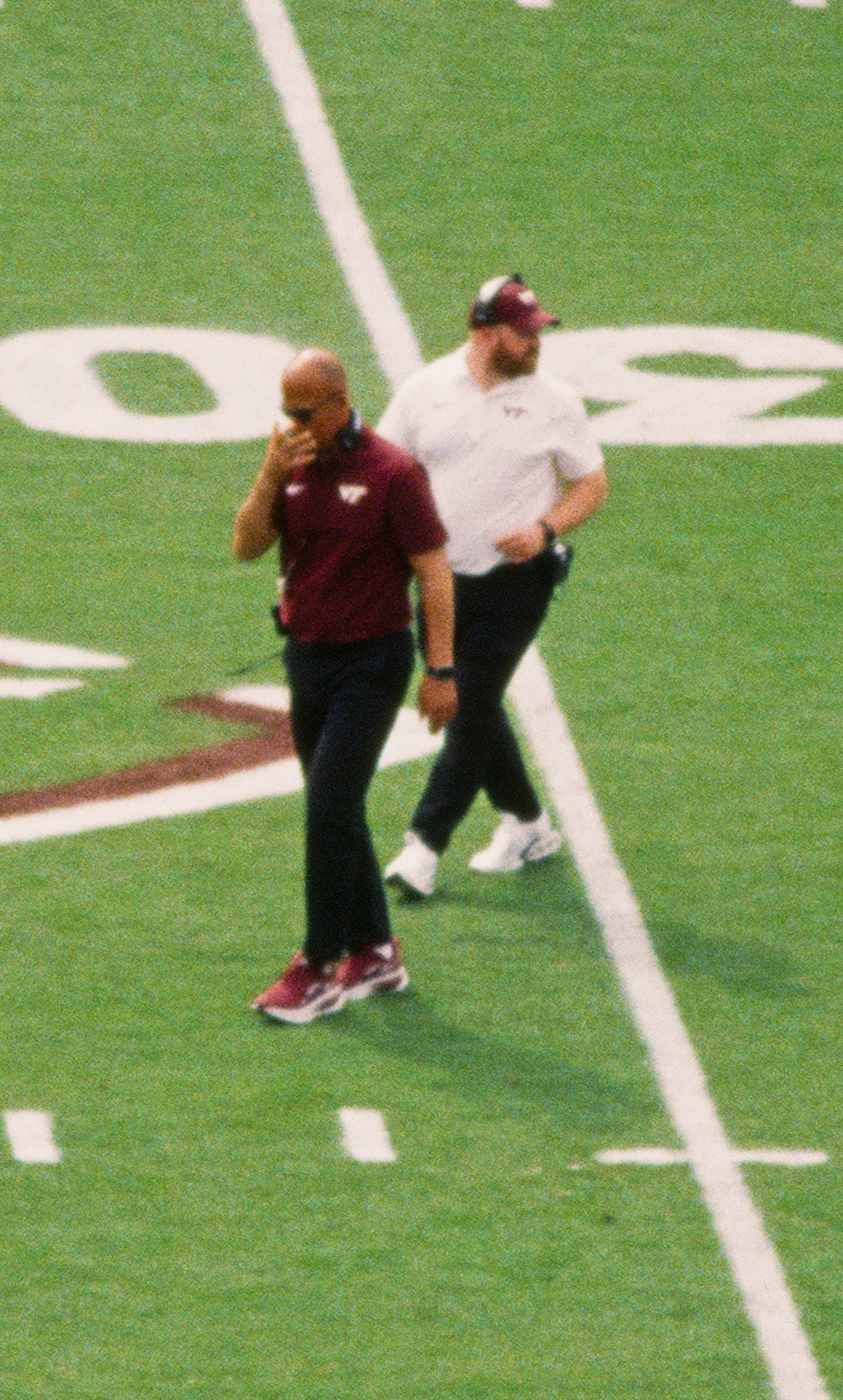
Franklin's first Spring Game as Virginia Tech's head coach

On November 17, 2025, Franklin was named the 36th head coach at Virginia Tech, replacing his former defensive coordinator Brent Pry. He sought counsel and support from Virginia Tech's all-time wins leader, Frank Beamer, before taking the job. In an unusual move, Franklin brought Pry back to Virginia Tech as his defensive coordinator; the two have been close friends for 30 years.

== Personal life ==
While serving as the tight ends coach at Washington State, Franklin met his wife, Fumi (then a student at Washington State), in 1998. Franklin was a graduate assistant coaching tight ends and pursuing a master's degree in educational leadership. They were reintroduced when Franklin was coaching at Maryland several years later. They began a long-distance relationship that led to an engagement in Green Bay, where Franklin worked in 2005. The Franklins have two daughters, Addy and Shola.

== Philanthropy ==
James Franklin was named Penn State's 43rd Annual Renaissance Fund honoree in 2019. The Renaissance Fund dinner was held on October 30, 2019, at the Bryce Jordan Center on the campus of Penn State. The dinner raised over $287,600 for endowed scholarships at Penn State.

After arriving at Penn State, his teams devoted hundreds of hours each semester to service, including an annual team trip to the Penn State Children's Hospital at the Milton S. Hershey Medical Center to visit with young children battling pediatric cancers. Franklin has spoken at every THON since 2014, and the Franklin family has generously supported THON through annual gifts including a $10,000 gift made in honor of football players Charlie Shuman, Nick Scott.

Franklin has also been an ardent supporter of "Be the Match," encouraging community members to join the national bone marrow registry.

Prior to Penn State's 2019 appearance in the Cotton Bowl, James Franklin matched a $10,000 donation from Goodyear to the Children's Medical Center Dallas.

== Head coaching record ==
Year	Team	Overall	Conference	Standing	Bowl/playoffs	Coaches^{#}	AP^{°}
Vanderbilt Commodores (Southeastern Conference) (2011–2013)
2011	Vanderbilt	6–7	2–6	T–4th (Eastern)	L Liberty		
2012	Vanderbilt	9–4	5–3	4th (Eastern)	W Music City	20	23
2013	Vanderbilt	9–4	4–4	4th (Eastern)	W BBVA Compass	23	24
Vanderbilt:		24–15	11–13				
Penn State Nittany Lions (Big Ten Conference) (2014–2025)
2014	Penn State	7–6	2–6	6th (East)	W Pinstripe		
2015	Penn State	7–6	4–4	4th (East)	L TaxSlayer		
2016	Penn State	11–3	8–1	T–1st (East)	L Rose^{†}	7	7
2017	Penn State	11–2	7–2	T–2nd (East)	W Fiesta^{†}	8	8
2018	Penn State	9–4	6–3	3rd (East)	L Citrus	17	17
2019	Penn State	11–2	7–2	2nd (East)	W Cotton^{†}	9	9
2020	Penn State	4–5	4–5	3rd (East)			
2021	Penn State	7–6	4–5	4th (East)	L Outback		
2022	Penn State	11–2	7–2	3rd (East)	W Rose^{†}	7	7
2023	Penn State	10–3	7–2	3rd (East)	L Peach^{†}	13	13
2024	Penn State	13–3	8–1	T–2nd	W CFP First Round^{†}, W Fiesta^{†}, L Orange^{†}	5	5
2025	Penn State	3–3 (Note: Penn State fired Franklin after six games.)	0–3				
Penn State:		104–45	64–36				
Virginia Tech Hokies (Atlantic Coast Conference) (2026–present)
2026	Virginia Tech	6–5	3–5				
Virginia Tech:		6–5	3–5				
Total:		134–65					
National championship Conference title Conference division title or championship game berth
^{†}Indicates CFP / New Years' Six bowl.; ^{#}Rankings from final Coaches Poll.; ^{°}Rankings from final AP Poll.

== Head coaching tree ==
Seven of Franklin's assistant coaches have become NCAA head coaches:

- Manny Diaz – Duke (2024–present)
- Charles Huff – Marshall (2021–2024), Southern Miss (2025), Memphis (2026–present)
- Joe Moorhead – Mississippi State (2018–2019); Akron (2022–present)
- Gerad Parker – Troy (2024–present)
- Brent Pry – Virginia Tech (2022–2025)
- Ricky Rahne – Old Dominion (2020–present)
- Terry Smith – Penn State (2025)
