= Jeff Badet =

American gridiron football player (born 1994)

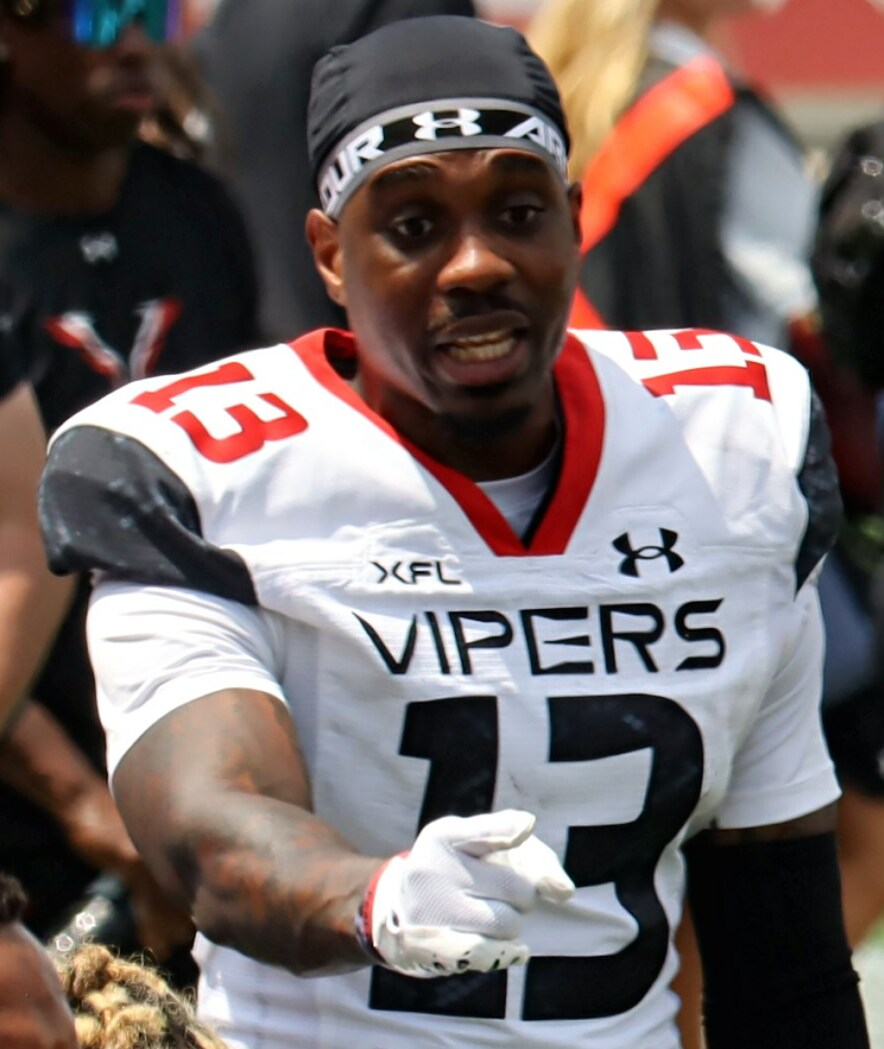
- Badet with the Vegas Vipers in 2023

No. 84, 13
- Position: Wide receiver

Personal information
- Born: August 2, 1994 (age 32); Orlando, Florida, U.S.
- Listed height: 5 ft 11 in (1.80 m)
- Listed weight: 183 lb (83 kg)

Career information
- High school: Freedom (Orlando)
- College: Kentucky (2013–2016); Oklahoma (2017)
- NFL draft: 2018: undrafted

Career history
- Minnesota Vikings (2018–2019)*; Dallas Renegades (2020); Washington Football Team (2020); Atlanta Falcons (2021)*; Las Vegas Raiders (2021)*; Michigan Panthers (2022); Vegas Vipers (2023); Toronto Argonauts (2024)*
- * Offseason or practice squad member only

Career XFL statistics
- Receptions: 50
- Receiving yards: 557
- Yards per reception: 11.1
- Receiving touchdowns: 5
- Stats at Pro Football Reference

Jeff Badet (born August 2, 1994) is an American former professional football player who was a wide receiver in the National Football League (NFL). He played college football for the Kentucky Wildcats before transferring to the Oklahoma Sooners to finish his collegiate career, and signed with the Minnesota Vikings as an undrafted free agent in 2018. He was also a member of the Dallas Renegades, Washington Football Team, Atlanta Falcons, Las Vegas Raiders, Michigan Panthers, Vegas Vipers, and Toronto Argonauts. In the 2020 XFL draft, he was selected fourth overall by the Renegades.

== Early life ==
Badet attended Freedom High School in Orlando, Florida, playing for the school's football team as a wide receiver. He was ranked as a three-star recruit and as the nation's 127th receiver prospect by 247sports, committing to the University of Kentucky, rejecting other offers from colleges closer to his home, such as South Florida and FIU.

== College career ==
In 2013, his freshman year, he saw limited action, appearing in eight games, totalling 22 receptions for 285 yards and one touchdown. Following a serious injury, Badet was medically redshirted for his second year, the 2014 collegiate season. In his sophomore season the year after, Badet played in eleven of the team's twelve games and compiled 29 receptions for 430 yards and two touchdowns, as the team's third leading receiver. His junior season was his most productive of his college career, appearing in all 13 games, with 31 catches for 670 yards and 4 touchdowns, leading the team in receiving yards. In the seventh game of the season, Badet had best statistical game of his career, with 7 receptions for 139 yards and 2 touchdowns in a 40–38 victory over Mississippi State, his sole multi-touchdown collegiate game. In the offseason, Badet declined to declare for the NFL draft and instead transferred to Oklahoma, crossing conferences into the Big 12. Badet was less statistically productive, totalling 26 receptions for 400 yards and three touchdowns, but the Sooners enjoyed team success, finishing with a 12–2 record behind Heisman Trophy-winning and eventual first overall pick Baker Mayfield, culminating with a 54–48 defeat in the Rose Bowl against Georgia. He served as an influencing presence on the field and locker room, and ran a 4.27 40-yard dash at Oklahoma's Pro Day.

=== College statistics ===
Year	Team	Games		Receiving					
Year	Team	GP	GS	Rec	Yds	Avg	Ypg	Lg	TD
2013	Kentucky	10	5	22	285	13.0	28.5	56	1
2014	Kentucky	1	0	0	0	0.0	0.0	0	0
2015	Kentucky	12	10	29	430	14.8	35.8	45	2
2016	Kentucky	13	13	31	670	21.6	51.5	72	4
2017	Oklahoma	13	2	26	400	15.4	30.8	54	3
Career		49	30	108	1,785	16.5	36.4	72	10

== Professional career ==
Pre-draft measurables
Height	Weight	Arm length	Hand span	40-yard dash	10-yard split	20-yard split	20-yard shuttle	Three-cone drill	Vertical jump	Broad jump	Bench press
5 ft 11 1/8 in (1.81 m)	182 lb (83 kg)	31 in (0.79 m)	9 1/4 in (0.23 m)	4.34 s	1.57 s	2.59 s	4.54 s	7.24 s	39.5 in (1.00 m)	10 ft 11 in (3.33 m)	16 reps
All values from Pro Day

=== Minnesota Vikings ===
Badet declared for the 2018 NFL draft but went undrafted and later signed as an undrafted free agent for the Minnesota Vikings. He was placed in the team's concussion protocol after the first preseason game against the Jacksonville Jaguars, but returned for the team's next three preseason games. He appeared in all four of the team's preseason games, totalling 5 receptions for 34 yards. He was placed on the team's practice squad before the start of the season. In June 2019 he participated in the 40 Yards of Gold contest to determine the fastest player in the NFL and he was supposed to earn $25,000, but only received a check for his participation and performance.

Badet re-signed with the Vikings and was given a $75,000 bonus to keep him away from the New York Jets, who were also pursuing him. He appeared in the team's four 2019 preseason games, seeing limited snaps, touching the ball just twice for 17 yards. Badet was hampered by a groin injury that forced him to miss several practices. He was cut by the Vikings before the start of the 2019 NFL season.

=== Dallas Renegades ===
Badet declared for the 2020 XFL draft, impressing team scouts at the various combines and was selected as the fourth pick of the skills position phase by the Dallas Renegades. Renegades general manager and head coach Bob Stoops, who coached at Oklahoma before Badet's arrival in 2017, drafted him. Badet had a unique helmet that featured Allen Iverson, Michael Jackson, and SpongeBob SquarePants. In his second game against the Los Angeles Wildcats, Badet caught six passes for 53 yards. Badet finished the season with 16 receptions for 108 yards. He had his contract terminated when the league suspended operations on April 10, 2020.

=== Washington Football Team ===
On September 17, 2020, Badet signed with the Washington Football Team's practice squad. He was elevated to the active roster on October 24 and November 7 for the team's Weeks 7 and 9 games against the Dallas Cowboys and New York Giants, and reverted to the practice squad after each game. Badet was promoted to the active roster on November 9. He was waived on December 19, and re-signed to the practice squad three days later.

Badet signed a reserve/futures contract with the team on January 11, 2021. Badet was waived by the Football Team on May 3.

=== Atlanta Falcons ===
On June 17, 2021, Badet signed with the Atlanta Falcons. He was waived/injured on August 6, and placed on injured reserve. Badet was released by the Falcons on August 17 with an injury settlement.

=== Las Vegas Raiders ===
On November 10, 2021, Badet was signed to the Las Vegas Raiders' practice squad. He was released by the Raiders on December 4.

=== Michigan Panthers ===
On February 23, 2022, Badet was selected with the sixth pick of the 15th round of the 2022 USFL draft by the Michigan Panthers. He was transferred to the team's inactive roster on April 22, due to a hamstring injury. Badet was released by the Panthers on May 10.

=== Vegas Vipers ===
Badet was selected by the Vegas Vipers of the XFL in the 2023 XFL draft.

In his debut with the team he caught six passes for 81 yards and two touchdowns, including the first touchdown of the season from Luis Perez in the team's 20–22 loss. The Vipers folded when the XFL and USFL merged to create the United Football League (UFL).

=== Toronto Argonauts ===
On February 8, 2024, it was announced that Badet had been signed by the Toronto Argonauts. He was placed on the retired list on May 12.

== Professional statistics ==
=== Regular season ===
Year	Team	League	Games		Receiving					
Year	Team	League	GP	GS	Rec	Yds	Avg	YPG	Lg	TD
2018	MIN	NFL	DNP							
2019	MIN	NFL	DNP							
2020	DAL	XFL	5	4	16	108	6.7	21.6	16	0
2020	WAS	NFL	3	0	0	0	0.0	0	0	0
2021	ATL	NFL	DNP							
2021	LV	NFL	DNP							
2022	MIC	USFL	1	0	1	12	12.0	12.0	12	0
2023	VGS	XFL	9	8	34	449	13.2	49.9	56	5
Career			24	13	51	569	11.2	23.7	56	5
