= Dieugot Joseph =

American football player (born 1994)

No. 78
- Position: Offensive tackle

Personal information
- Born: March 21, 1994 (age 32); Orlando, Florida, U.S.
- Listed height: 6 ft 6 in (1.98 m)
- Listed weight: 293 lb (133 kg)

Career information
- High school: Freedom (Orlando)
- College: FIU
- NFL draft: 2017: undrafted

Career history
- Chicago Bears (2017)*; Baltimore Ravens (2017); Minnesota Vikings (2017–2018)*; New York Jets (2018–2019)*; Atlanta Falcons (2019)*; Philadelphia Eagles (2019)*
- * Offseason or practice squad member only
- Stats at Pro Football Reference

Dieugot Joseph (born March 21, 1994) is an American former football offensive tackle. He played college football at FIU, and signed with the Chicago Bears as an undrafted free agent in 2017.

== High school and college career ==
Joseph played high school football at Freedom High School (Orlando, Florida) in Orlando, Florida. Joseph played both football and basketball while at high school and committed to Florida International University Panthers on December 11, 2011.

Joseph redshirted his freshman year in 2012. As a sophomore, Joseph appeared in all 12 games and started in eight of them. In 2013, Joseph was a member of an offensive line that gained 4,173 yards of offense (fifth-most in school history).

In his senior year, Joseph was an All-C-USA Honorable Mention selection. He was also named as a game captain in their game against Maryland. Joseph started in all 12 games on an offensive line that helped produce 4,503 yards of total offense (No. 4 all-time for yards in a season at FIU).

== Professional career ==
=== Chicago Bears ===
Joseph signed with the Chicago Bears as an undrafted free agent on May 11, 2017. He was waived on September 2, 2017, and was signed to the practice squad the next day.

=== Baltimore Ravens ===
On September 19, 2017, Joseph was signed by the Baltimore Ravens off the Bears' practice squad. He was waived by the Ravens on October 10, 2017, and was signed to the practice squad the next day.

=== Minnesota Vikings ===
On January 9, 2018, Joseph was signed to the Minnesota Vikings' practice squad. He signed a reserve/future contract with the Vikings on January 22, 2018. He was waived on August 31, 2018.

=== New York Jets ===
On September 3, 2018, Joseph was signed to the New York Jets' practice squad. He was released on October 8, 2018, but was re-signed nine days later. He signed a reserve/future contract with the Jets on December 31, 2018. He was waived on May 14, 2019.

=== Atlanta Falcons ===
On May 29, 2019, Joseph signed with the Atlanta Falcons. He was waived on August 27, 2019, with an injury settlement.

=== Philadelphia Eagles ===
On January 1, 2020, Joseph was signed to the Philadelphia Eagles practice squad. His practice squad contract with the team expired on January 13, 2020.

Joseph had a tryout with the Dallas Cowboys on August 17, 2020, and with the Washington Football Team on August 19, 2020.

== Personal life ==
Joseph is of Haitian descent.
