= 2014 BBVA Compass Bowl =

| Vanderbilt Commodores | Houston Cougars |
| (8–4) | (8–4) |
| SEC | The American |
| 41 | 24 |
| Head coach: James Franklin | Head coach: Tony Levine |
| | 1 | 2 | 3 | 4 | Total |
|---|---|---|---|---|---|
| Vanderbilt | 14 | 10 | 0 | 17 | 41 |
| Houston | 0 | 0 | 24 | 0 | 24 |
- Date: January 4, 2014
- Season: 2013
- Stadium: Legion Field
- Location: Birmingham, Alabama
- Favorite: Vanderbilt by 2½
- Referee: Steve LaMantia (C-USA)
- Attendance: 42,717
- Payout: US$900,000

United States TV coverage
- Network: ESPN
- Announcers: Dave Neal (play-by-play), Andre Ware (analyst), Dawn Davenport (sideline)

The 2014 BBVA Compass Bowl was an American college football bowl game that was played on January 4, 2014 at Legion Field in Birmingham, Alabama. The eighth edition of the BBVA Compass Bowl (which was originally called the Birmingham Bowl), it featured the Vanderbilt Commodores of the Southeastern Conference and the Houston Cougars of the American Athletic Conference. It was one of the 2013–14 bowl games that concluded the 2013 FBS football season. The game began at 12:00 p.m. CST and was telecast on ESPN. It was sponsored by the BBVA Compass banking company. Vanderbilt defeated Houston by a score of 41–24.

Both the Commodores and the Cougars accepted their invitations after earning 8–4 records in their respective season schedules. This was the first BBVA Compass Bowl for both Vanderbilt and Houston, as well as the first time the schools had played each other in football.

== Teams ==
=== Vanderbilt ===
The Commodores continued their winning ways under third-year coach James Franklin, finishing the season 8–4 overall and 4–4 in conference play, which was good enough for fourth place in the SEC East. At season's end, they accepted an invitation to play in the game. This will be the first January bowl game for the Commodores. All previous bowl appearances for the school were in December games. Statistical leaders for the Commodores are Jerron Seymor, 144 rushes for 627 yards; Austyn Carta-Samuels, 193 passes for 2,268 yards for 11 touchdowns; Jordan Matthews, who caught 107 passes for 1,334 yards and 5 TDs; Kenny Ladler and Darreon Herring had 87 and 80 tackles respectively. This was their 4th bowl game in 6 years.

=== Houston ===
The Cougars' first season as a member of the American Athletic Conference marked a return to their winning ways, seeing the team finishing 8–4 overall and 5–3 in conference play which was good for fourth in the conference. At season's end, they accepted the invitation to play in the game. Statistical leaders for the Cougars are Ryan Jackson, 137 rushes for 655 yards; John O'Kom, 239 passes for 2,889 yards for 26 touchdowns; Deontay Greenberry, who caught 76 passes for 1,106 yards and 10 TDs; Efrem Oliphant and Derrick Mathes had made 123 and 110 tackles respectively during the season.

== Game summary ==
=== Scoring summary ===
Scoring summary

| Quarter | Time | Drive | | | Team | Scoring information | Score | |
| Quarter | Time | Plays | Yards | TOP | Team | Scoring information | Vanderbilt | Houston |
|---|---|---|---|---|---|---|---|---|
| 1 | 9:57 | 4 | 73 | 2:01 | VAN | Jordan Matthews 50-yard touchdown reception from Patton Robinette, Carey Spear kick good | 7 | 0 |
| 1 | 1:33 | 4 | 16 | 1:56 | VAN | Patton Robinette 8-yard touchdown run, Carey Spear kick good | 14 | 0 |
| 2 | 10:27 | 7 | 44 | 2:51 | VAN | 24-yard field goal by Carey Spear | 17 | 0 |
| 2 | 7:09 | 4 | 73 | 1:54 | VAN | Jordan Matthews 50-yard touchdown reception from Patton Robinette, Carey Spear kick good | 24 | 0 |
| 3 | 10:12 | 1 | 6 | 0:05 | HOU | Kenneth Farrow 6-yard touchdown run, Kyle Bullard kick good | 24 | 7 |
| 3 | 6:25 | 6 | 86 | 1:28 | HOU | Markeith Ambles 6-yard touchdown reception from John O'Korn, Kyle Bullard kick good | 24 | 14 |
| 3 | 3:19 | 4 | 67 | 1:20 | HOU | 30-yard field goal by Kyle Bullard | 24 | 17 |
| 3 | 0:19 | 3 | 83 | 0:56 | HOU | Deontay Greenberry 67-yard touchdown reception from John O'Korn, Kyle Bullard kick good | 24 | 24 |
| 4 | 9:28 | 7 | 82 | 3:28 | VAN | Brian Kimbrow 21-yard touchdown run, Carey Spear kick good | 31 | 24 |
| 4 | 6:17 | 4 | -1 | 2:24 | VAN | 35-yard field goal by Carey Spear | 34 | 24 |
| 4 | 1:42 | 2 | 2 | 0:54 | VAN | Jerron Seymour 2-yard touchdown run, Carey Spear kick good | 41 | 24 |
| "TOP" = time of possession. For other American football terms, see Glossary of American football. | | | | | | | 41 | 24 |

=== Statistics ===
| Statistics | Vanderbilt | Houston |
|---|---|---|
| First downs | 14 | 11 |
| Total offense, plays – yards | 71–365 | 75–381 |
| Rushes-yards (net) | 52–211 | 27–143 |
| Passing yards (net) | 154 | 239 |
| Passes, Comp-Att-Int | 6–19–2 | 21–48–2 |
| Time of Possession | 35:36 | 24:19 |
