= Jonathan Wynn =

American football player (born 1994)

No. 69
- Position: Defensive end

Personal information
- Born: September 21, 1994 (age 32); Stone Mountain, Georgia, U.S.
- Listed height: 6 ft 4 in (1.93 m)
- Listed weight: 260 lb (118 kg)

Career information
- High school: Stephenson (Stone Mountain)
- College: Vanderbilt (2013–2017)
- NFL draft: 2018: undrafted

Career history
- Minnesota Vikings (2018)*; Detroit Lions (2018–2019); Carolina Panthers (2020)*
- * Offseason or practice squad member only
- Stats at Pro Football Reference

Jonathan Paul Wynn (born September 21, 1994) is an American former professional football defensive end who played for the Detroit Lions of the National Football League (NFL). He played college football for the Vanderbilt Commodores.

== Early life ==
Jonathan Paul Wynn was born on September 21, 1994, in Stone Mountain, Georgia. He played high school football at Stephenson High School in Stone Mountain, and was a two-year starter at defensive end. He posted 51 tackles and eight sacks as a junior in 2011. During the 2012 season, he recorded 87 tackles and 11 sacks, earning first-team all-state honors. Wynn was also a two-year letterman in track in high school.

== College career ==
Wynn enrolled at Vanderbilt University to play college football for the Commodores. He was redshirted in 2013, and was a four-year letterman from 2014 to 2017. He played in 11 games in 2014 at outside linebacker and on special teams. He started a few games early in the year and finished the 2014 season with 13 tackles and one sack. Wynn played in all 12 games, starting four, at defensive end in 2015, posting 21 tackles, one sack, and one pass breakup while rotating with Caleb Azubike. Wynn appeared in 12 games, starting 10, at defensive end during the 2016 season, totaling 28 tackles, one sack, and three pass breakups. He was named to the 2016 Fall SEC Academic Honor Roll. He played in 11 games, starting nine, as a redshirt senior in 2017, recording 23 tackles, 1.5 sacks, and two pass breakups. He majored in educational studies and history at Vanderbilt.

== Professional career ==
After going undrafted in the 2018 NFL draft, Wynn signed with the Minnesota Vikings on May 4, 2018. He was waived on September 1 but later signed to the Vikings' practice squad on October 1. He was placed on the practice squad/injured list on October 23 and was released on November 27, 2018.

On December 12, 2018, Wynn was signed to the Detroit Lions' practice squad. He signed a reserve/future contract with Detroit on December 31, 2018. He was waived on August 31, 2019, signed to the practice squad on September 1, released on September 18, signed to the practice squad again on September 21, released for the third time on September 25, and signed to the practice squad for the third time on October 1. Wynn was promoted to the active roster on December 21. He played in his only career NFL regular season game on December 22, 2019, against the Denver Broncos, appearing in seven snaps on defense and five snaps on special teams while posting one assisted tackle. He was waived by the Lions on August 9, 2020.

Wynn was signed to the Carolina Panthers' practice squad on November 26, 2020. He became a free agent after the season.
