= Freedom High School (Orlando, Florida) =

Public secondary school in Orlando, Florida, United States

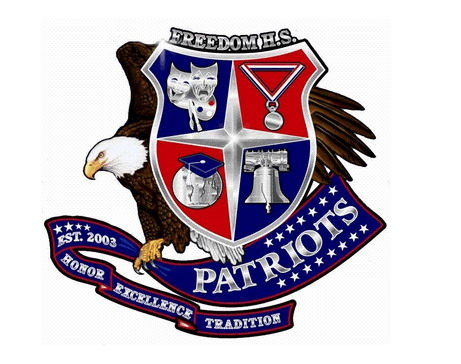

Location
- 2500 Taft-Vineland Road; Orlando, Florida 32837; United States

Information
- Type: Public
- Motto: Honor, Excellence, and Tradition
- Established: 2003
- School district: Orange County Public Schools
- Principal: Charles France
- Teaching staff: 109.00 (on an FTE basis)
- Grades: 9–12
- Enrollment: 2,504 (2024-2025)
- Student to teacher ratio: 22.97
- Colors: Red, White, and Navy Blue
- Athletics: FHSAA Class 8A, District 5
- Team name: Patriots
- Website: freedomhs.ocps.net

Freedom High School is located in Orlando, Florida. It is one of twenty public high schools in Orange County. The school was established in 2003 in order to relieve crowding at nearby Cypress Creek High School. Like other relief high schools, they share a sports rivalry dubbed the South Orange Classic. Freedom's feeder schools are Freedom Middle School, Hunter's Creek Middle School, and West Ridge Middle School in Oak Ridge. The current principal is Mr. Charles France. It has nearly identical campus layouts as Olympia High School and Timber Creek High School. Lake Brantley High School in neighboring Seminole County has similar colors and nickname.

The school was originally to be named after a deceased Marine, but after the September 11 attacks in 2001, the county decided to rename it to Freedom High School. FHS was classified as an "A" school in 2010–11, 2013–14 and 2014–15.

== Academic programs ==
Freedom has a variety of academic programs for its prestigious students. These are: Compass (formerly Monticello) Academy, AVID, Advanced Placement (AP), Academy of Mass Media, Academy of Hospitality, and Early Childhood Education Academy.

In addition to that, students have a chance to receive career and technical training through their Tech Prep and Dual Enrollment Program at three of the local tech schools and Valencia College.

=== Compass Academy ===
The Compass Scholar Academy strives to build future generations of "Renaissance students", and challenges the status quo of IB (International Baccalaureate), Cambridge and other magnet programs by providing:

In addition, the Compass Scholar Academy is now promoting the opportunity to enroll in the AP Capstone program, which consists of AP Seminar and AP Research.

=== AVID ===
Advancement Via Individual Determination (AVID) is a fourth through twelfth grade system that prepares students academically and make them eligible for college. Students involved in the program are enrolled in their school's most challenging and rigorous classes, Honors and AP, and develops each students organization and study skills. At Freedom High School, students will enroll in college preparatory courses and the AVID elective class. In the AVID class, students are taught the needed skills for success and tutored in collaborative working groups with mentors. In the AVID elective class student are taught study skills, Cornell note-taking system, time management, writing, reading, and research skills. Students also learn about colleges and universities (especially the application and financial aid processes) and prepare for college admission tests such as the SAT or ACT. Students are encouraged to explore occupations through research, curriculum, and guest speakers.

=== Advanced Placement ===
Advanced Placement program sponsored by College Board are a series of college-level courses in which you can take exams (through College Board) to receive college credit.

Freedom offers many Advanced Placement Classes. All of the AP instructors, class content, and syllabus have been approved by the College Board.

AP Classes offered:

2-D Design, 3-D Design, Drawing, US History, Psychology, World History, Human Geography, US Government, European History, Art History, Music Theory, Capstone Seminar, Capstone Research, Physics 1, Physics C: E&M, Physics C: Mech, Calculus AB, Calculus BC, Pre-calculus, Biology, Environmental Science, Statistics, Chemistry, Economics, English Language and Composition, English Literature, Spanish Language, Spanish Literature, French Language.

=== Academy of Hospitality ===
The Academy of Travel and Tourism is one of several model programs established by the National Academy Foundation. These academies work by combining career-oriented courses in the classroom with career building experiences in local business and in the community.

It motivates students to complete a Hospitality oriented high school curriculum, to develop career goals, and to pursue higher education.

=== Early Childhood Education Academy ===
The Academy of Early Childhood Education is for students who are interested in pursuing a career in education or working in the child care industry. The academy offers students a rigorous and relevant curriculum, hands-on training, and opportunities for earning state certifications, the Early Childhood Professional Certificate, as well as scholarships and college credit. The academy students will work with the children on campus at Freedom Friends Preschool, local daycares, and elementary and middle schools. The program consists of 120 hours of classroom instruction and 480 hours of direct work with children.

=== Dual enrollment ===
Dual enrollment (DE) involves students being enrolled in two separate, academically related institutions. A student goes to high school while also taking higher-level courses at a local community college or university. Credits received at the college level counts towards high school credit as well.

Juniors with at least a 3.0 unweighted GPA and Seniors with at least a 3.0 weighted GPA in Orange or Osceola County are given the chance to dual enroll at Valencia College, University of Central Florida, or University of Florida to start their college education while still attending high school. This allows students to not only receive their high school diplomas but receive a college degree as well.

Dual enrollment courses become part of a permanent college transcript, so students must commit to doing the work required or risk jeopardizing future college plans.

== Extracurricular activities ==
=== Athletics ===
The school sponsors the following sports: athletic training, bowling, football, flag football, fencing, volleyball (both girls' and boys'), cross country, lacrosse, soccer, swimming and diving, wrestling, weightlifting, track and field, water polo, golf, baseball, softball, special Olympics, and tennis.

The teams are commonly referred to as the Patriots and the Lady Patriots.

== Notable alumni ==
- Juan "Hungrybox" Debiedma (Class of 2011), professional Super Smash Bros. Melee player
- Jeff Badet, WR Dallas Renegades
- Dieugot Joseph, OT New York Jets
