= Jordan Matthews =

American football player (born 1992)

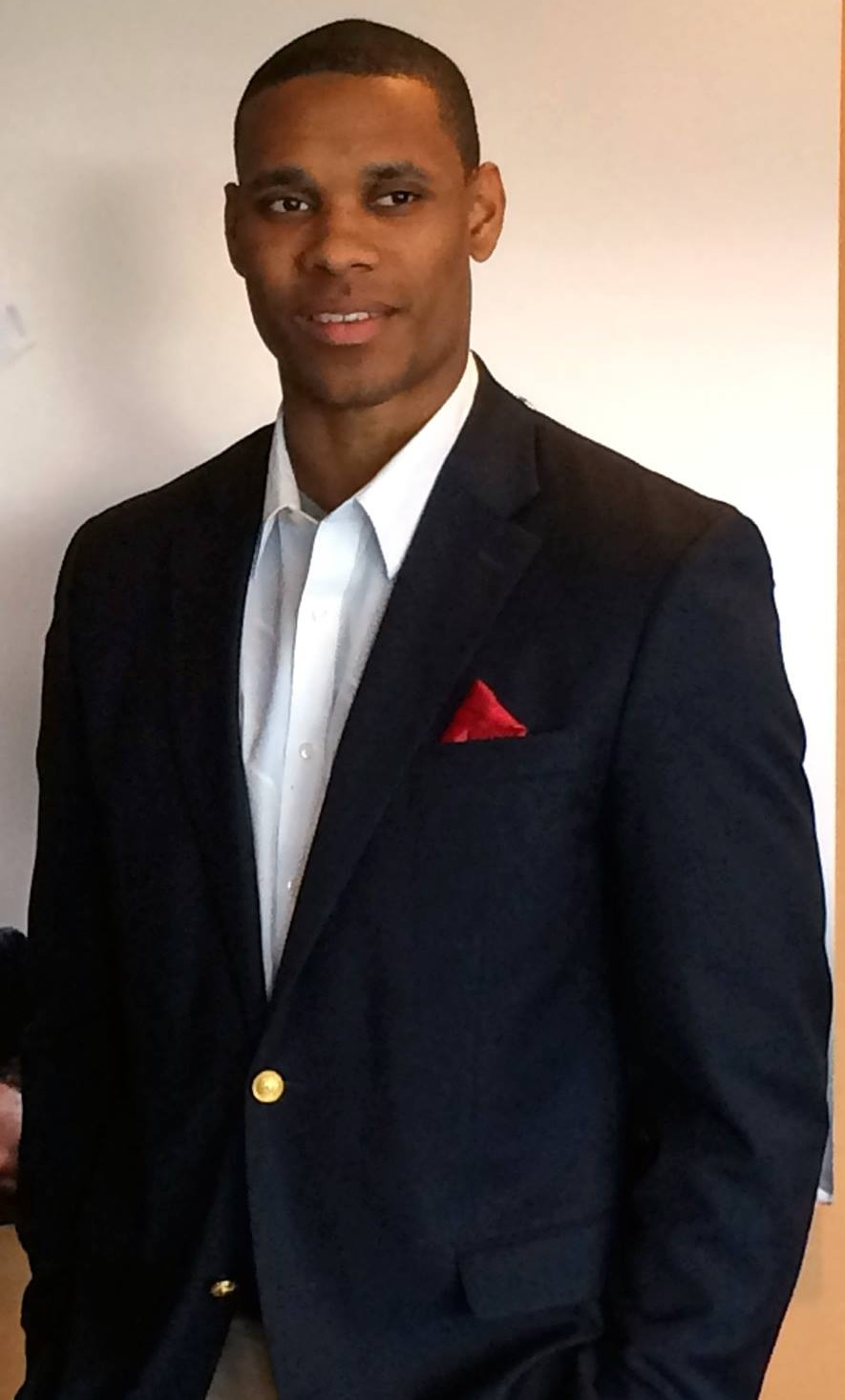
- Matthews in 2014

Profile
- Position: Tight end

Personal information
- Born: July 16, 1992 (age 34); Madison, Alabama, U.S.
- Listed height: 6 ft 3 in (1.91 m)
- Listed weight: 236 lb (107 kg)

Career information
- High school: Madison Academy (Madison)
- College: Vanderbilt (2010–2013)
- NFL draft: 2014: 2nd round, 42nd overall pick

Career history
- Philadelphia Eagles (2014–2016); Buffalo Bills (2017); New England Patriots (2018)*; Philadelphia Eagles (2018); San Francisco 49ers (2019); Philadelphia Eagles (2019); San Francisco 49ers (2019–2022); Carolina Panthers (2023–2024)
- * Offseason or practice squad member only

Awards and highlights
- First-team All-American (2013); 2× First-team All-SEC (2012, 2013)

Career NFL statistics as of 2024
- Receptions: 274
- Receiving yards: 3,288
- Receiving touchdowns: 22
- Stats at Pro Football Reference

Jordan Armand Matthews (born July 16, 1992) is an American professional football tight end. He played college football for the Vanderbilt Commodores and was selected by the Philadelphia Eagles in the second round of the 2014 NFL draft. Matthews started his NFL career as a wide receiver before switching positions after the 2020 season.

== Early life ==
Matthews was born on July 16, 1992, in Madison, Alabama. He attended Madison Academy where he lettered in football and basketball. As a senior at Madison Academy, Matthews led the football team to a 12–1 record. For his high school football career at Madison Academy, Matthews had 181 receptions, 3,218 receiving yards, and 38 touchdowns.

Matthews was a three star recruit. Auburn began recruiting Matthews during his junior year of high school when Phillip Lolley, the director of Football External Operations at the time, called the Matthewses. Matthews was planning to walk on at Auburn before receiving an offer from Vanderbilt. Matthews received a scholarship offer from Vanderbilt head coach Bobby Johnson on Christmas Eve in 2009 after wide receiver prospect and eventual Ohio State cornerback Bradley Roby de-committed from Vanderbilt. Matthews only received scholarship offers from Vanderbilt, Kansas, Tulane, Arkansas St., and Jacksonville St. Matthews committed to Vanderbilt on December 26, 2009.

== College career ==
As a true freshman at Vanderbilt, Matthews had 15 receptions for 181 yards and four touchdowns in 2010. As a sophomore in 2011, he had 41 receptions for 778 yards and five touchdowns. Matthews was included in the 2012 Biletnikoff Award Watch List. As a junior in 2012, Matthews was a first-team All-Southeastern Conference (SEC) selection and was named third-team All-American by Phil Steele and CBS SportsLine.com. He finished the season with 94 receptions for 1,323 yards and eight touchdowns.

Matthews was included on the 2013 Maxwell Award Watch List and the 2013 CFPA Wide Receiver Trophy Watch List. As a senior in 2013, Matthews was again a first-team All-SEC selection. He would also be named a first-team All-American by USA Today, Athlon, CBS Sports, Sports Illustrated, and the Associated Press. During the season, he set the all-time SEC record for career receptions and career receiving yards. Matthews also was a semi-finalist for the Biletnikoff Award and won the 2013 CFPA Elite Wide Receiver Trophy. On November 16, 2013, Matthews was named SEC Offensive Player of the Week. In his final college game, he was the MVP of the 2014 BBVA Compass Bowl after recording five receptions for 143 yards and two touchdowns. He finished the season with 112 receptions for 1,477 yards and seven touchdowns. Matthews' 112 receptions in 2013 set the SEC record for most receptions in a single season. Amari Cooper broke this record a year later with 124 receptions.

For his collegiate career, Matthews had 262 receptions for 3,759 yards, both marks serving as both SEC and school records. His 24 career touchdowns are also the best in school history.

Matthews graduated from Vanderbilt with a degree in economics.

== Professional career ==
Pre-draft measurables
Height	Weight	Arm length	Hand span	40-yard dash	10-yard split	20-yard split	20-yard shuttle	Three-cone drill	Vertical jump	Broad jump	Bench press	Wonderlic
6 ft 3 1/8 in (1.91 m)	212 lb (96 kg)	33 1/4 in (0.84 m)	10 3/8 in (0.26 m)	4.46 s	1.55 s	2.61 s	4.18 s	6.95 s	35.5 in (0.90 m)	10 ft 0 in (3.05 m)	21 reps	29
All values from NFL Combine

=== Philadelphia Eagles (first stint) ===
The Philadelphia Eagles selected Matthews in the second round of the 2014 NFL draft with the 42nd overall pick. The Eagles traded up 12 spots in order to draft him. On May 27, 2014, he signed with the team for a four-year deal. He scored his first and second career touchdowns in a Week 3 matchup against the Washington Redskins. In a Monday Night Football matchup in Week 10, he caught 7 passes for 138 yards and two touchdowns against the Carolina Panthers. He finished the season with 67 catches for 872 yards and eight touchdowns.

Matthews started his second year in the NFL with a game against the Atlanta Falcons. He had 10 receptions for 102 yards in the 26–24 loss. On October 8, against the Dallas Cowboys, Matthews had nine receptions for 133 yards and one touchdown. On December 20, against the Arizona Cardinals, Matthews had eight receptions for 159 yards and one touchdown. On January 3, 2016, in the regular season finale against the New York Giants, Matthews had his only multi-touchdown game of the season. In the 35–30 victory, he had seven receptions for 54 yards and two touchdowns. On the season, he had 85 receptions for 997 yards and eight touchdowns.

With rookie quarterback Carson Wentz, Matthews started his third year in the NFL with a game against the Cleveland Browns. He had seven receptions for 114 yards and one touchdown in the 29–10 victory. The season opener would be Matthews' best game of the season as he would fail to break 100 receiving yards again on the season. Against the Cowboys on October 30, he had a season-high 11 receptions for 65 yards and one touchdown in the 29–23 loss. On the season, he had 73 receptions for a career-low 804 yards and a career-low three touchdowns.

=== Buffalo Bills ===
On August 11, 2017, the Eagles traded Matthews, along with a 2018 third-round pick, to the Buffalo Bills in exchange for cornerback Ronald Darby.

On September 10, Matthews made his debut as a member of the Bills. He had two receptions for 61 yards in the 21–12 victory over the New York Jets. Matthews caught his first touchdown with the Bills during a 23–17 upset win over the defending National Football Conference (NFC) Champions Falcons, but fractured his right thumb during the game. He was expected to be out for a month following surgery, but returned against the Tampa Bay Buccaneers three weeks after his injury. He was placed on injured reserve on December 5, 2017, with a knee injury. He finished the 2017 season with career-lows with 25 receptions for 282 yards and one touchdown.

=== New England Patriots ===
On April 5, 2018, Matthews signed a one-year contract with the New England Patriots worth $1 million, with $300,000 guaranteed. However, on August 1, 2018, he was released by the Patriots with an injury settlement following a hamstring injury that he suffered three days prior during training camp.

=== Philadelphia Eagles (second stint) ===
The Eagles re-signed Matthews on September 19, 2018, to help with an injury-depleted receiving corps. In Week 4, against the Tennessee Titans, he recorded a 56-yard receiving touchdown for his first touchdown in his return to Philadelphia. Matthews finished the season with 20 catches for 300 yards and 2 touchdowns, and had 1 catch for 37 yards and a touchdown in 2 playoff games.

=== San Francisco 49ers (first stint) ===
On March 14, 2019, Matthews signed a one-year contract with the San Francisco 49ers. He was released by the 49ers during final roster cuts on August 31, 2019. He was re-signed on October 3, 2019, but was released again on October 26.

=== Philadelphia Eagles (third stint) ===
Matthews re-signed with the Eagles on November 11, 2019. He was waived on November 25, 2019.

=== San Francisco 49ers (second stint) ===
On December 11, 2019, Matthews was signed by the 49ers. Although he did not play in the 49ers playoff run, the team appeared in Super Bowl LIV but they lost 31–20 to the Kansas City Chiefs.

On November 27, 2020, Matthews was signed to the practice squad of the 49ers'. He was released on December 8, and re-signed to the practice squad on December 23, 2020. He was elevated to the active roster on December 25 and January 2, 2021, for the team's weeks 16 and 17 games against the Arizona Cardinals and Seattle Seahawks, and reverted to the practice squad after each game. His practice squad contract with the team expired after the season on January 11, 2021.

Following the season, Matthews announced a position switch to tight end after playing wide receiver throughout his career up to that point. He put on 30 pounds as part of his new training. He re-signed with the 49ers on July 31, 2021. He was released on August 31, 2021, and re-signed to the practice squad the next day. He was released on September 22. He was re-signed on October 5. He signed a reserve/future contract with the 49ers on February 2, 2022. He was placed on season-ending injured reserve by the 49ers on August 4, after suffering a torn ACL in practice.

=== Carolina Panthers ===
On October 25, 2023, Matthews was signed to the Carolina Panthers practice squad. He was signed to the active roster on November 7, 2023. He was released on November 13 and re-signed to the practice squad. He signed a reserve/future contract on January 8, 2024.

On August 27, 2024, Matthews was released by the Panthers and re-signed to the practice squad the next day, then promoted back to the active roster. He was released on September 17, and re-signed to the practice squad. He was promoted back to the active roster on November 2. Matthews was released and re-signed to the practice squad on November 15. He signed a reserve/future contract on January 6, 2025.

On May 8, 2025, Matthews was released by the Panthers.

== NFL career statistics ==
Legend
**Bold**	Career High

=== Regular season ===
Team	Team	Game		Receiving				
Team	Team	GP	GS	Rec	Yds	Avg	Lng	TD
2014	PHI	16	10	67	872	13.0	44	**8**
2015	PHI	16	12	**85**	**997**	11.7	**78**	**8**
2016	PHI	14	13	73	803	11.0	54	3
2017	BUF	10	7	25	282	11.3	47	1
2018	PHI	14	3	20	300	**15.0**	56	2
2019	SF	1	0	0	0	0.0	0	0
2019	PHI	2	1	4	33	8.3	10	0
2020	SF	2	0	0	0	0.0	0	0
2021	SF	1	0	0	0	0.0	0	0
2023	CAR	1	0	0	0	0.0	0	0
Career		76	46	274	3,288	12.0	78	22

=== Playoffs ===
Year	Team	Games		Receiving					
Year	Team	GP	GS	Tgt	Rec	Yds	Avg	Lng	TD
2018	PHI	2	0	2	1	37	37	37	1
Career		2	2	2	1	37	37	37	1

== Personal life ==
Matthews is married to Chicago Red Stars soccer player Cheyna Williams, who also attended Vanderbilt before graduating from Florida State University. The couple have three sons together. Matthews is a Christian.

Matthews' parents are Brenda and Rod Matthews. He has one brother, Justin. Matthews is related to Hall of Fame wide receiver Jerry Rice, as his mother is Rice's cousin.

Matthews is a member of Kappa Alpha Psi fraternity.

On July 7, 2018, Matthews hosted his second Vanderbilt Legends Charity Softball Game at Vanderbilt's Hawkins Field. The proceeds from the event benefited YWCA and AMEND Together, two organizations that fight domestic violence. The event included a home run derby and a softball game with teams composed of former Vanderbilt athletes. The event is a part of Matthews' foundation called Matthews Mission.
