= Derek Mason =

American football player and coach (born 1969)

Current position
- Title: Head coach
- Team: Middle Tennessee
- Conference: Conference USA
- Record: 12–23

Biographical details
- Born: September 29, 1969 (age 57); Phoenix, Arizona, U.S.

Playing career
- 1989–1992: Northern Arizona
- Position: Cornerback

Coaching career (HC unless noted)
- 1994: Mesa (AZ) (WR)
- 1995–1996: Weber State (WR)
- 1997–1998: Idaho State (RB)
- 1999–2001: Bucknell (DB)
- 2002: Utah (WR/ST)
- 2003: Saint Mary's (AHC/co-DC)
- 2004: New Mexico State (WR)
- 2005–2006: Ohio (WR)
- 2007–2009: Minnesota Vikings (asst. DB)
- 2010: Stanford (DB)
- 2011: Stanford (AHC/co-DC/DB)
- 2012–2013: Stanford (AHC/DC)
- 2014–2020: Vanderbilt
- 2021: Auburn (DC)
- 2022: Oklahoma State (DC)
- 2024–present: Middle Tennessee

Head coaching record
- Overall: 39–78
- Bowls: 0–2

Derek Mason (born September 29, 1969) is an American college football coach who is currently the head football coach for Middle Tennessee State University. He previously served as head coach at Vanderbilt University from 2014 to 2020.

== Early life and playing career ==
Mason attended Camelback High School in Phoenix, Arizona. After graduating from high school, he attended Northern Arizona University, where he was a four-year letterman and two-year starter at cornerback.

== Coaching career ==
After his playing career ended, Mason coached college football at Mesa Community College, Weber State, Bucknell, Utah, St. Mary's, New Mexico State, and Ohio. From 2007 to 2009, he coached defensive backs for the Minnesota Vikings of the NFL under Brad Childress, who had been one of his coaches at Northern Arizona.

=== Stanford ===
In 2010, Mason was hired as defensive backs coach on Jim Harbaugh's staff at Stanford. In 2011, Mason was promoted to associate head coach and co-defensive coordinator under new head coach David Shaw. In 2012, Mason became the sole defensive coordinator for the Cardinal and was a finalist for the Broyles Award, given annually to the top assistant coach in college football. In 2013, the defensive coordinator position was endowed and named the Willie Shaw Director of Defense,

=== Vanderbilt ===
On January 17, 2014, Vanderbilt hired Mason as its new head football coach, succeeding James Franklin. With the hire, Vanderbilt is the first and only school in the Southeastern Conference (SEC) to have multiple minority head football coaches in its history. After back–to–back home losses, Mason won his first game as head coach against UMass by a score of 34–31. Vanderbilt had been outscored 10–78 in the two games prior to the win. The Commodores struggled offensively for much of the season. Vanderbilt did not score an offensive touchdown for nine quarters and was the last Division I team to reach the end zone on offense. With victories over Charleston Southern and Old Dominion, he finished the season with a 3–9 record.

After a disappointing first season in Nashville, Mason fired both his offensive and defensive coordinators. He hired Andy Ludwig, formerly the offensive coordinator at Wisconsin, to run the offense. Mason decided to call the defensive plays himself.

His second season saw moderate growth for Vanderbilt, culminating in a 4–8 record with numerous firsts for the young head coach. Mason earned his first win against an SEC opponent (10–3 victory over Missouri) and his first win while on the road (17–13 victory over Middle Tennessee State University). The team was praised for a nationally respected defensive scheme, but the Commodores were unable to perform equally well with their offensive or special team capabilities.

Mason continued his role as head coach and defensive coordinator in his third season at Vanderbilt, leading the Commodores to a 6–6 (3–5 SEC) record in 2016, earning bowl eligibility for the first time as a head coach. Mason won his first SEC road game on October 15 at Georgia by the final score of 17–16. The Commodores nearly picked up another road win against a ranked conference opponent on November 5 at Auburn, losing 23–16 after throwing a late interception at the opponents' 30 yard line in the final minute. After a disappointing loss to Missouri the next week, the Commodores needed to beat both Ole Miss and Tennessee at home in the team's final two games of the season to assure themselves of bowl eligibility, though they would have still reached a bowl with a 5–7 record based on a high Academic Performance Rating (APR), which determines the bowl eligibility of five win teams for open bowl slots. APR became a non-factor as the Commodores upset both Ole Miss and Tennessee at home in back-to-back games to end the regular season with a 6–6 record on the strength of three conference wins. Vandy scored a combined 83 points in the two wins as the offense came alive late in the season. Mason's dancing on the sideline and post-game celebration after defeating Tennessee were widely shared on Twitter and ESPN.

Under Mason, redshirt junior linebacker Zach Cunningham became a national finalist for the Butkus Award, given to the nation's best collegiate linebacker. He was Mason's first player at Vanderbilt to be a consensus All-American.

Year four for Mason was a disappointing regression in the 2017 season. Despite an historic 3–0 start, including defeating a then 18th ranked Kansas State at home in week 3 and ending a five-year losing streak of opening games since 2012, the Commodores finished 5–7 and were unable to play in a bowl game despite APR. Derek Mason was unable to answer the Alabama Crimson Tide in week 4 with a 59–0 loss, and experienced a five-game losing streak until defeating Western Kentucky 31–17 in week 10. However, despite their lackluster performance, Vanderbilt was able to defeat Tennessee, ensuring the Volunteers' first ever eight-loss season.

The 2018 season began with Mason considered on the hot seat, one of 10 coaches identified by ESPN to be facing this challenge. He earned significant conference victories over Arkansas and Ole Miss. He is the first Vanderbilt football coach to beat the Tennessee Volunteers three years in a row since Dan McGugin did it in 1924, 1925, and 1926. Vanderbilt went 6–6 in the regular season and earned a spot in the Texas Bowl, where they lost 45–38 to Baylor.

The 2019 season saw significant regression for Vanderbilt and Mason. The team scored ten points or less in six of their 12 games. The team went 3–9, with the lone conference victory coming in a 21–14 upset against Missouri.

During the COVID-19-shortened conference-only 2020 season, Mason helped the program make history by introducing Sarah Fuller, the school's women's soccer goalkeeper, into a November 28 game against Missouri. Fuller was the first woman to play in a game for a Power Five conference team, kicking off the second half, although Fuller never got a chance to kick a field goal or an extra point that day with Vanderbilt falling to Missouri 41–0 and 0–8 on the season. Fuller's appearance was not enough to offset seven consecutive seasons with a losing record, and the next day Mason was fired. Partially due to the COVID-19-shortened season, Mason became the first coach in school history to go winless in a season.

=== Auburn ===
On January 7, 2021, Mason was hired as the Auburn Tigers’ defensive coordinator.

=== Oklahoma State ===
On January 26, 2022, it was announced that Mason was hired as the next defensive coordinator for the Oklahoma State Cowboys after the departure of previous defensive coordinator Jim Knowles. Mason would not return for the following season.

=== Middle Tennessee ===
Mason was announced as the 15th head coach of the Middle Tennessee Blue Raiders football team on December 6, 2023. Mason coached the Blue Raiders to a 3–9 mark in the 2024 season. In the 2025 season, he led the team to another 3–9 record.

== Personal life ==
Mason and his wife, LeighAnne, have two daughters, Sydney and Makenzie. Makenzie was a lacrosse player for the University of Florida.

== Head coaching record ==
Year	Team	Overall	Conference	Standing	Bowl/playoffs
Vanderbilt Commodores (Southeastern Conference) (2014–2020)
2014	Vanderbilt	3–9	0–8	7th (Eastern)	
2015	Vanderbilt	4–8	2–6	T–4th (Eastern)	
2016	Vanderbilt	6–7	3–5	T–5th (Eastern)	L Independence
2017	Vanderbilt	5–7	1–7	6th (Eastern)	
2018	Vanderbilt	6–7	3–5	6th (Eastern)	L Texas
2019	Vanderbilt	3–9	1–7	7th (Eastern)	
2020	Vanderbilt	0–8*	0–8*	(Eastern)	
Vanderbilt:		27–55	10–46	*Fired after 8 games.	
Middle Tennessee (Conference USA) (2024–present)
2024	Middle Tennessee	3–9	2–6	T–8th	
2025	Middle Tennessee	3–9	2–6	T–9th	
2026	Middle Tennessee	6–5	4–3		
Middle Tennessee:		12–23	8–15		
Total:		39–78			
