= Matt Rhule =

American football player and coach (born 1975)

- Rhule at 2025 Big Ten Football Media Days

Current position
- Title: Head coach
- Team: Nebraska
- Conference: Big Ten
- Record: 26–23
- Annual salary: $9.25 million

Biographical details
- Born: January 31, 1975 (age 51); New York City, U.S.

Playing career
- 1994–1997: Penn State
- Position: Linebacker

Coaching career (HC unless noted)
- 1998: Penn State (volunteer asst.)
- 1998: Albright (LB)
- 1999–2000: Buffalo (DL)
- 2001: UCLA (DL)
- 2002: Western Carolina (LB/ST)
- 2003–2005: Western Carolina (AHC/LB/ST)
- 2006: Temple (DL)
- 2007: Temple (QB)
- 2008–2010: Temple (OC/QB)
- 2011: Temple (OC/TE)
- 2012: New York Giants (asst. OL)
- 2013–2016: Temple
- 2017–2019: Baylor
- 2020–2022: Carolina Panthers
- 2023–present: Nebraska

Head coaching record
- Overall: 73–66 (college); 11–27 (NFL)
- Bowls: 2–3

Accomplishments and honors

Championships
- 1 AAC (2016); 2 AAC East (2015, 2016)

Awards
- Sporting News Coach of the Year (2019); Big 12 Coach of the Year (2019)

Matthew Kenneth Rhule (born January 31, 1975) is an American college football coach and former linebacker. He is currently the head football coach for the University of Nebraska–Lincoln, a position he has held since 2023. He was also the head football coach for Temple University from 2013 to 2016, Baylor University from 2017 to 2019, and the Carolina Panthers of the National Football League (NFL). Rhule played linebacker at Penn State from 1994 to 1997.

Rhule was born and raised in New York City before moving to State College, Pennsylvania for high school, where he later joined Penn State's football team as a walk-on under Joe Paterno. After a four-year playing career for the Nittany Lions, Rhule began his coaching career as a volunteer assistant at his alma mater. Over the following decade he served as an assistant at several schools, and in 2008 Rhule became the offensive coordinator at Temple. After a brief stint as an assistant for the NFL's New York Giants, Rhule returned to Temple as the program's head coach in 2013. During his four-year tenure, he led the Owls to their only two ten-win seasons since 1979. Rhule was hired as Baylor's head coach following Temple's victory in the 2016 American Athletic Conference Championship Game. After finishing 8–17 across Rhule's first two seasons, the Bears improved to 11–3 in 2019.

Rhule returned to the NFL in 2020 as head coach of the Carolina Panthers. The Panthers missed the playoffs in each of Rhule's first two seasons and he was fired after a 1–4 start to 2022, departing Carolina with a combined record of 11–27. The following month, Rhule agreed to an eight-year contract to become Nebraska's head coach.

== Early years ==
Rhule was born in New York City on January 31, 1975, to parents Dennis and Gloria. When he was a teenager, Rhule's family moved to State College, Pennsylvania, where he played linebacker at State College Area High School before walking on at Penn State under head coach Joe Paterno. He played for the Nittany Lions for four years and became a three-time Penn State Scholar-Athlete and a 1997 Academic All-Big Ten honoree.

Rhule earned a bachelor's degree in political science from Penn State in 1997 and a master's degree in educational psychology from the University at Buffalo in 2003.

== Coaching career ==
=== Early coaching career ===
Following the end of his playing career, Rhule was hired as the linebackers coach at Albright College. After one year at Albright, Rhule served as a position coach at Buffalo, UCLA, and Western Carolina before being hired at Temple as a defensive line coach in 2006 under Al Golden. Rhule became the Owls' quarterbacks coach the following year, his first offensive coaching role, and was named offensive coordinator in 2008. When Golden left for Miami in 2010, Rhule interviewed for Temple's vacant head coaching job, which was instead given to Steve Addazio.

After six years as an assistant at Temple, Rhule joined Tom Coughlin's New York Giants staff as an assistant offensive line coach, a season after the Giants won their fourth Super Bowl.

=== Temple ===
When Addazio departed for Boston College following the 2012 season, several veteran Owls players voiced their support for Rhule to return. Rhule, an area native who had referred to Temple as a "dream job," was formally hired as the school's twenty-sixth head coach on December 17, 2012.

Temple began Rhule's first season 0–6, which included a loss to Idaho that would be the Vandals' only win of the season. His first victory as a head coach, a 33–14 defeat of Army on October 19, was followed by four more losses, and the Owls finished 2–10. Temple improved to 6–6 the following year, ending the season with a 10–3 victory over Tulane to achieve bowl eligibility, though the Owls were not invited to a bowl game.

Temple opened Rhule's third season with a 27–10 win over his alma mater Penn State, the Owls' first win over the Nittany Lions since 1941. Led by eventual Chuck Bednarik Award winner Tyler Matakevich and third-year starting quarterback P. J. Walker (who would later serve as a backup for the Carolina Panthers under Rhule), Temple started a season 7–0 for the first time in school history. Though Temple lost four of its final seven games, including the inaugural American Athletic Conference championship game, the program's ten wins were its most since 1979. Rhule was reportedly a target of Missouri and Syracuse during the 2015 season; a four-year contract extension he had signed in July was re-negotiated to keep him at Temple.

The Owls returned to the conference championship game in 2016, where they defeated Navy 34–10 to win the program's second conference championship. Rhule accepted the head coaching job at Baylor prior to the 2016 Military Bowl; special teams coordinator Ed Foley served as interim head coach in Temple's upset loss to Wake Forest.

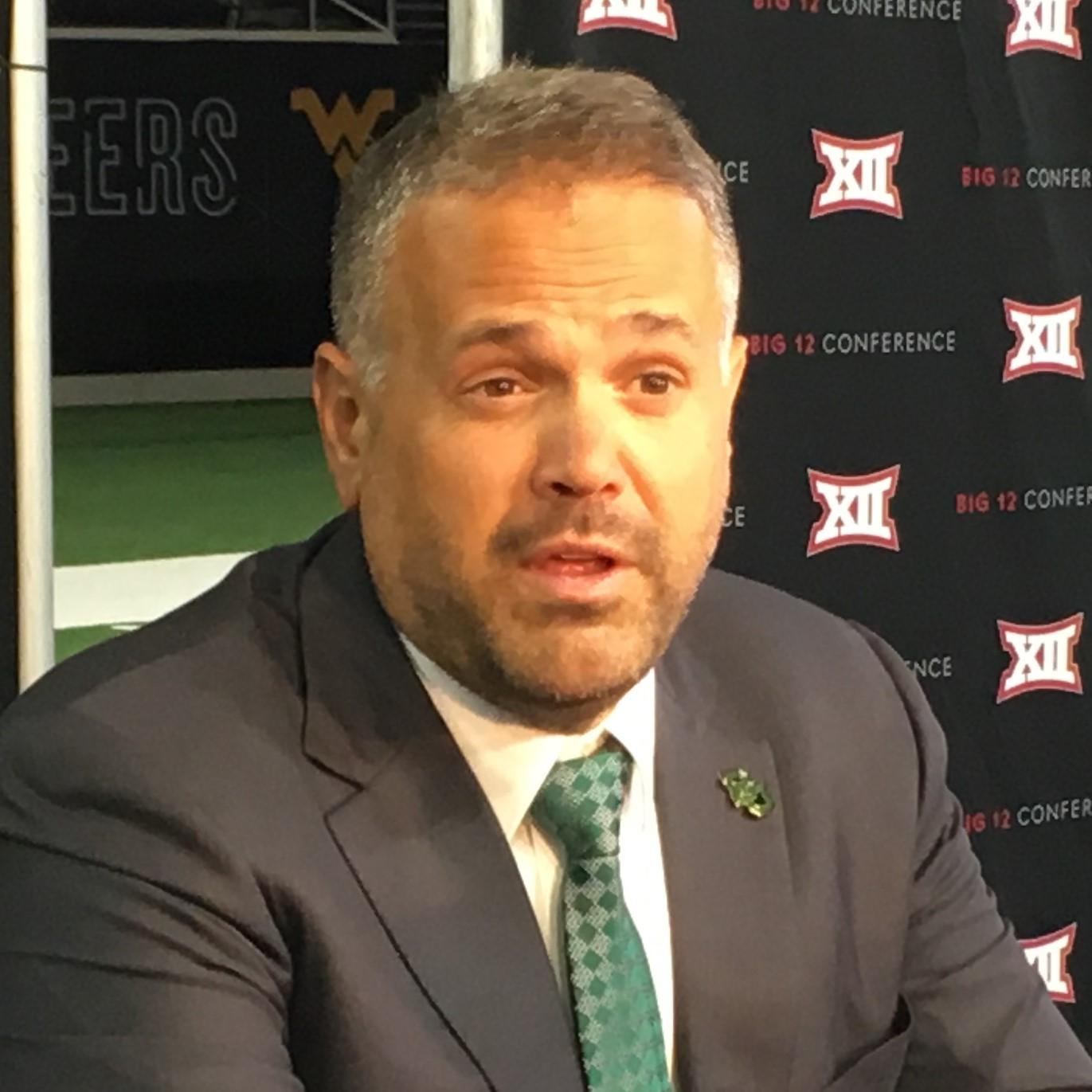
Rhule at Big 12 Media Days in 2017

=== Baylor ===
When Rhule was introduced as Baylor's head coach on December 7, 2016, the program was in a state of significant transition. Longtime head coach Art Briles and his entire staff were fired or resigned as a result of the school's sexual assault scandal. Briles's immediate successor was veteran Jim Grobe, who took over in an interim capacity in 2016, leading Baylor to a 7–6 record and a seventh consecutive bowl appearance. Though generally well-received, Rhule's hire was considered something of a surprise, as athletic director Mack Rhoades had stressed the importance of Baylor's head coach having Texas connections; Rhule had never lived or coached in the state.

Baylor finished 1–11 in Rhule's first season, the program's worst record since 1969. The Bears improved to 6–6 the following year and were invited to the 2018 Texas Bowl, defeating Vanderbilt 45–38 in Rhule's first bowl win as a head coach. Shortly after the beginning of the 2019 season, Rhule signed a four-year contract extension which tied him to the school through 2027.

Baylor began the 2019 season 9–0, winning five games decided by eight points or less and reaching a No. 12 national ranking. After a loss to Oklahoma, the Bears won their final two games to finish the regular season 11–1, ranked seventh nationally. Rhule was named Big 12 Coach of the Year. After Baylor dropped each of its postseason games (a rematch with Oklahoma in the Big 12 Championship Game and a meeting with Georgia in the Sugar Bowl), Rhule was named head coach of the Carolina Panthers.

=== Carolina Panthers ===
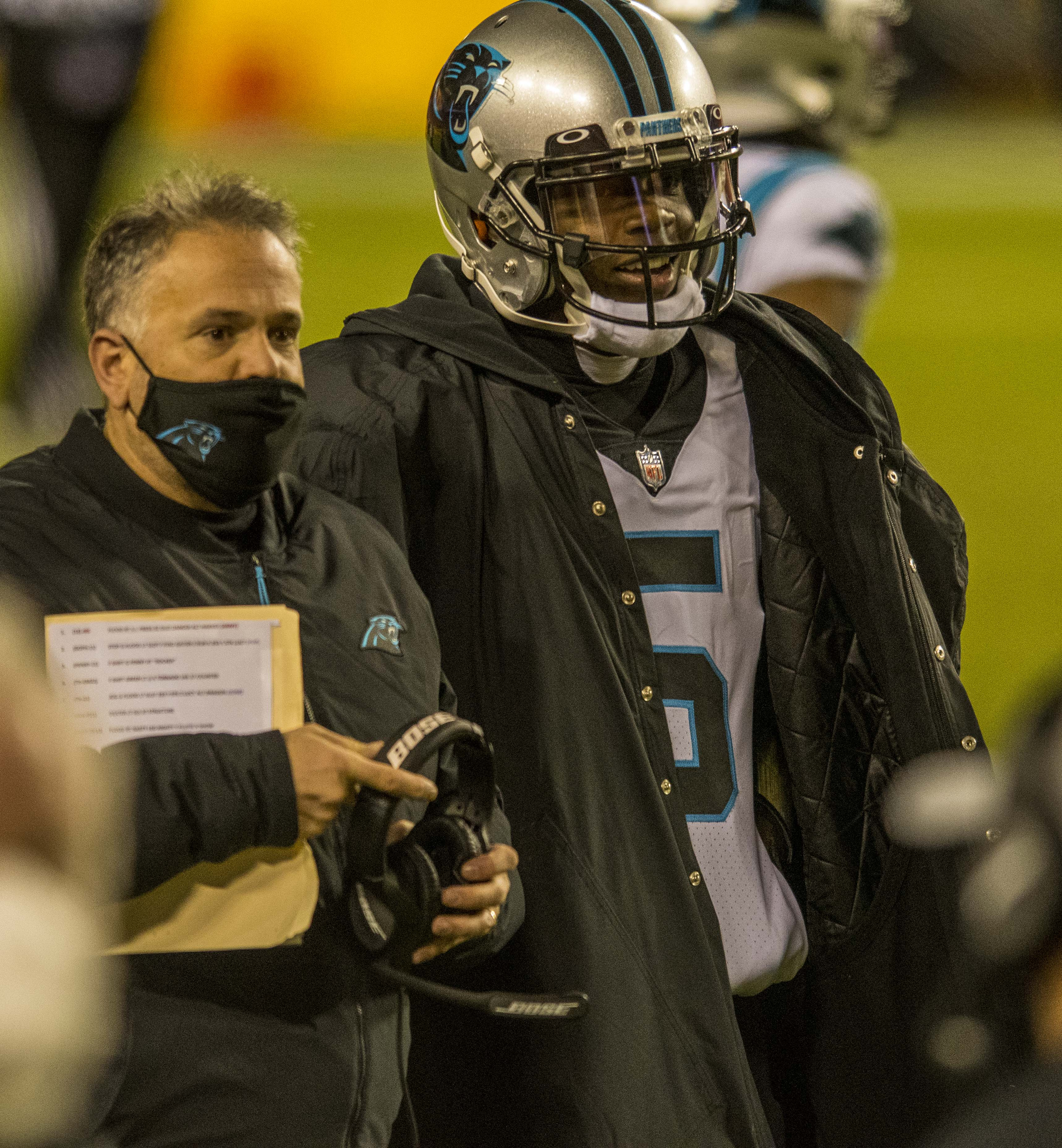
Rhule with quarterback Teddy Bridgewater in 2020

On January 7, 2020, Rhule signed a seven-year, $62-million contract to become the fifth head coach of the Carolina Panthers, replacing longtime coach Ron Rivera. Panthers owner David Tepper, overseeing his first head coaching hire, referred to Rhule as a "program builder" who "can build an organization for the next thirty or forty years." After the 2020 NFL preseason was canceled due to the COVID-19 pandemic, Carolina lost Rhule's NFL head coaching debut to the Las Vegas Raiders 34–30; he earned his first win against the Los Angeles Chargers in Week 3. A five-game midseason losing streak knocked the Panthers out of playoff contention, and they finished 5–11.

Prior to his second season in Carolina, Rhule, who had final say over the Panthers' roster decisions, traded incumbent starting quarterback Teddy Bridgewater and acquired Sam Darnold, the third overall selection in the 2018 NFL draft. Despite a 3–0 start to the season, Darnold ultimately failed to improve on his underwhelming tenure with the New York Jets. Carolina finished 29th in the league in points scored and lost their final seven games to finish 5–12, missing the playoffs for a fourth consecutive year.

Midway through the 2022 season, Tepper fired Rhule after a blowout loss to the San Francisco 49ers dropped Carolina to 1–4. Rhule, who was in the third year of a seven-year contract, received $40 million as part of his buyout.

=== Nebraska ===
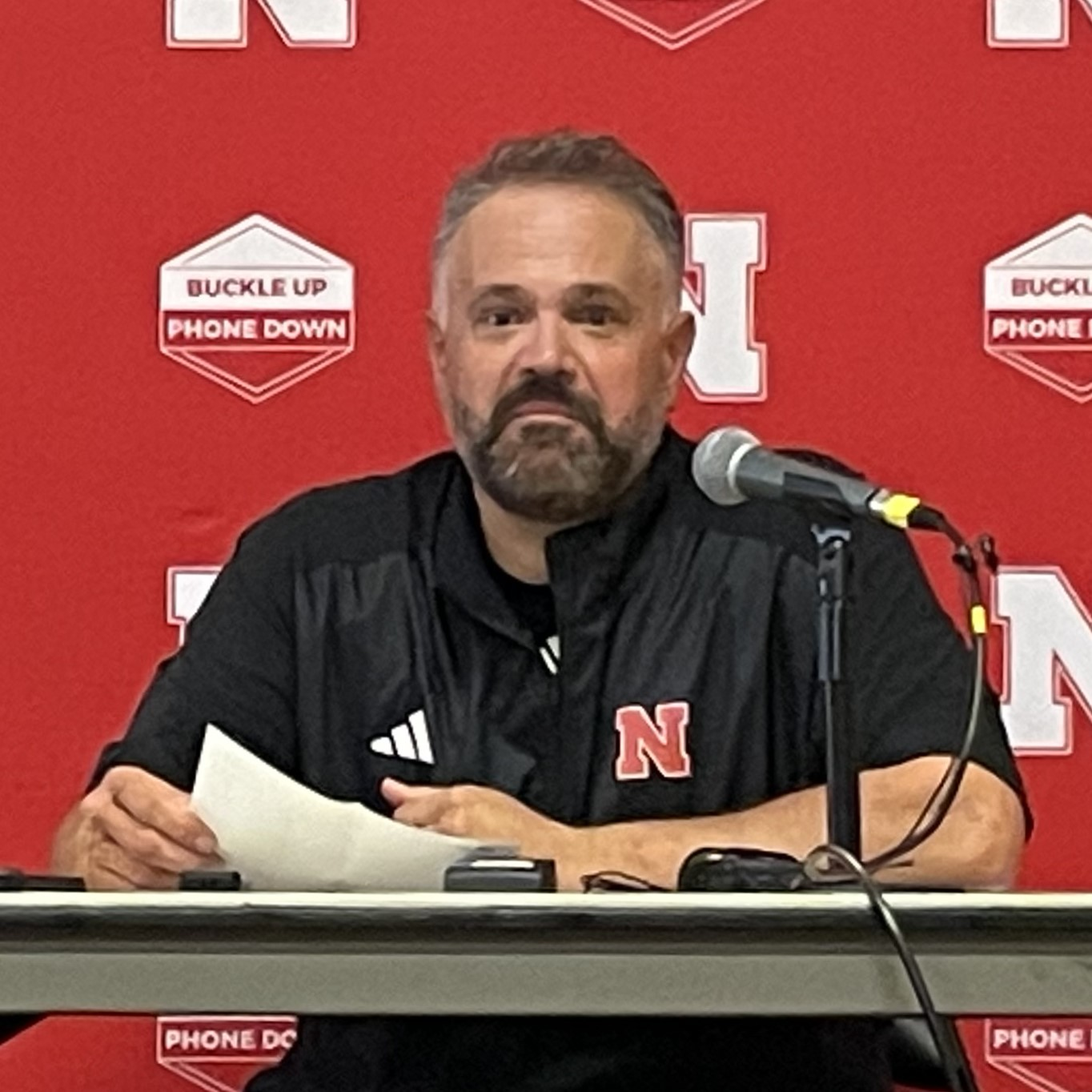
Rhule talks to press after his first game as head coach of Nebraska.

On November 26, 2022, Rhule signed an eight-year, $74-million contract to become the 31st head coach of the Nebraska Cornhuskers. Rhule finished his first season as head coach of Nebraska with a 5–7 record, tying his predecessor's highest win total in just his first year. Rhule's Huskers finished the year with a conference record of 3–6, tied for last in the Big Ten West division after losing the final four games of the season. In 2024, Nebraska finished with a 7–6 record, recording their first winning season since 2016 and winning the Pinstripe Bowl over Boston College, the Huskers first bowl win since 2015. At the end of the 2024 season, Rhule was 2–22 against top 25 teams in his career. His last win against a top 25 team came in 2016 while he was at Temple.

On October 30, 2025, Rhule agreed to a two-year contract extension with Nebraska, extending his deal through the 2032 season. The extension was due to the AD being concerned about the opening at Penn St, and ultimately proved to be unnecessary as the team lost 5 of its final 7 games to finish the regular season 7-5. The season ended with a 44–22 blowout loss to #15 Utah in the Las Vegas Bowl, following blowout losses to Penn State (10-37) and Iowa (16-40) to end the regular season.

Nebraska started the 2026 season 5-0 with wins over Ohio, Bowling Green, FCS North Dakota, Michigan State, and Maryland. Rhule’s Nebraska followed that with 3 straight one score losses to Indiana, Oregon, and Washington, blowing fourth quarter leads in all three games. They held all three teams to 6 points or less through three quarters, which dating back to 2001 teams that had done that were 4,514 and 282 (94% win percentage).

== Head coaching record ==
=== College ===
Year	Team	Overall	Conference	Standing	Bowl/playoffs	Coaches^{#}	AP^{°}
Temple Owls (American Athletic Conference) (2013–2016)
2013	Temple	2–10	1–7	T–9th			
2014	Temple	6–6	4–4	6th			
2015	Temple	10–4	7–1	1st (East)	L Boca Raton		
2016	Temple	10–3	7–1	1st (East)	Military*		
Temple:		28–23	19–13	* Departed Temple for Baylor before bowl game			
Baylor Bears (Big 12 Conference) (2017–2019)
2017	Baylor	1–11	1–8	9th			
2018	Baylor	7–6	4–5	T–5th	W Texas		
2019	Baylor	11–3	8–1	2nd	L Sugar^{†}	12	13
Baylor:		19–20	13–14				
Nebraska Cornhuskers (Big Ten Conference) (2023–present)
2023	Nebraska	5–7	3–6	4th (West)			
2024	Nebraska	7–6	3–6	T–12th	W Pinstripe		
2025	Nebraska	7–6	4–5	T–10th	L Las Vegas		
2026	Nebraska	7–4	4–4				
Nebraska:		26–23	14–21				
Total:		73–66					
National championship Conference title Conference division title or championship game berth
^{†}Indicates CFP / New Years' Six bowl.; ^{#}Rankings from final Coaches Poll.; ^{°}Rankings from final AP Poll.

=== NFL ===
Team	Year	Record	Win %	Finish	Postseason
CAR	2020	5–11	.313	3rd (NFC South)	—
CAR	2021	5–12	.294	4th (NFC South)	—
CAR	2022	1–4	.200	Fired	
Total		11–27	.289		

== Personal life ==
Rhule and his wife Julie have three children: Bryant, Vivienne, and Leona. In October 2026, Rhule made a cameo appearance as himself in the season 1 finale of Lanterns to recruit a fictional character from the town of Rushville, Nebraska to the University of Nebraska program.
