= 2018 Vanderbilt Commodores football team =

American college football season

2018 Vanderbilt Commodores football

Texas Bowl, L 38–45 vs. Baylor
- Conference: Southeastern Conference
- Eastern Division
- Record: 6–7 (3–5 SEC)
- Head coach: Derek Mason (5th season)
- Offensive coordinator: Andy Ludwig (4th season)
- Offensive scheme: Pro-style
- Defensive coordinator: Jason Tarver (1st season)
- Base defense: 3–4
- Home stadium: Vanderbilt Stadium

2018 Southeastern Conference football standings
	Conf.			Overall
Team	W		L	W		L
Eastern Division
No. T–7 Georgia x	7	–	1	11	–	3
No. 12 Kentucky	5	–	3	10	–	3
No. T–7 Florida	5	–	3	10	–	3
South Carolina	4	–	4	7	–	6
Missouri	4	–	4	8	–	5
Vanderbilt	3	–	5	6	–	7
Tennessee	2	–	6	5	–	7
Western Division
No. 2 Alabama x$^	8	–	0	14	–	1
No. 16 Texas A&M	5	–	3	9	–	4
No. 6 LSU	5	–	3	10	–	3
Mississippi State*	4	–	4	8	–	5
Auburn	3	–	5	8	–	5
Ole Miss	1	–	7	5	–	7
Arkansas	0	–	8	2	–	10
Championship: Alabama 35, Georgia 28
^ – College Football Playoff participant; $ – Conference champion; x – Division champion/co-champions; * Mississippi State vacated four conference and eight total wins due to NCAA violations.; Rankings from AP Poll

The 2018 Vanderbilt Commodores football team represented Vanderbilt University in the 2018 NCAA Division I FBS football season. The Commodores played their home games at Vanderbilt Stadium in Nashville, Tennessee and competed in the Eastern Division of the Southeastern Conference (SEC). They were led by fifth-year head coach Derek Mason. Vanderbilt finished the season 6–7, 3–5 in SEC play to finish in 6th place in the East Division. They were invited to play in the Texas Bowl where they were defeated by Baylor. This would be the last season the Commodores were bowl eligible until the 2024 season.

== Recruiting ==
=== Recruits ===
The Commodores signed a total of 19 recruits.

College recruiting information (2018)
Name	Hometown	School	Height	Weight	Commit date
Allan Walters; QB	Hightstown, New Jersey	The Peddie School	6 ft 1 in (1.85 m)	200 lb (91 kg)	Dec 16, 2016
Allan Walters; QB	Recruit ratings: Scout: Rivals: 247Sports: ESPN:				
Daniel Dawkins; C	Hightstown, New Jersey	The Peddie School	6 ft 3 in (1.91 m)	296 lb (134 kg)	Mar 30, 2017
Daniel Dawkins; C	Recruit ratings: Scout: Rivals: 247Sports: ESPN:				
Alston Orji; LB	Rockwall, Texas	Rockwall High School	6 ft 2 in (1.88 m)	230 lb (100 kg)	May 23, 2017
Alston Orji; LB	Recruit ratings: Scout: Rivals: 247Sports: ESPN:				
Ben Bresnahan; TE	Cumming, Georgia	West Forsyth High School	6 ft 5 in (1.96 m)	225 lb (102 kg)	Jun 14, 2017
Ben Bresnahan; TE	Recruit ratings: Scout: Rivals: 247Sports: ESPN:				
Gavin Schoenwald; TE	Brentwood, Tennessee	Brentwood Academy	6 ft 5 in (1.96 m)	225 lb (102 kg)	Jun 15, 2017
Gavin Schoenwald; TE	Recruit ratings: Scout: Rivals: 247Sports: ESPN:				
Camron Johnson; WR	Brentwood, Tennessee	Brentwood Academy	6 ft 1 in (1.85 m)	182 lb (83 kg)	Jun 16, 2017
Camron Johnson; WR	Recruit ratings: Scout: Rivals: 247Sports: ESPN:				
Javan Rice; K	Miami, Florida	Belen Jesuit Preparatory School	6 ft 3 in (1.91 m)	190 lb (86 kg)	Jun 16, 2017
Javan Rice; K	Recruit ratings: Scout: Rivals: 247Sports: ESPN:				
Wyatt Smock; OG	Louisville, Kentucky	St. Xavier High School	6 ft 4 in (1.93 m)	290 lb (130 kg)	Jun 21, 2017
Wyatt Smock; OG	Recruit ratings: Scout: Rivals: 247Sports: ESPN:				
Tre' Douglas; CB	McDonough, Georgia	Eagle's Landing Christian Academy	6 ft 2 in (1.88 m)	180 lb (82 kg)	Jun 22, 2017
Tre' Douglas; CB	Recruit ratings: Scout: Rivals: 247Sports: ESPN:				
Dashaun Jerkins; S	Woodbridge, Virginia	Woodbridge High School	6 ft 0 in (1.83 m)	190 lb (86 kg)	Jun 23, 2017
Dashaun Jerkins; S	Recruit ratings: Scout: Rivals: 247Sports: ESPN:				
Maxwell Worship; S	Fort Lauderdale, Florida	Cardinal Gibbons High School	6 ft 1 in (1.85 m)	198 lb (90 kg)	Jun 29, 2017
Maxwell Worship; S	Recruit ratings: Scout: Rivals: 247Sports: ESPN:				
JaVeon Marlow; RB	Winter Haven, Florida	Winter Haven High School	5 ft 10 in (1.78 m)	200 lb (91 kg)	Jul 9, 2017
JaVeon Marlow; RB	Recruit ratings: Scout: Rivals: 247Sports: ESPN:				
Brendon Harris; S	Chattanooga, Tennessee	Baylor School	6 ft 2 in (1.88 m)	195 lb (88 kg)	Oct 24, 2017
Brendon Harris; S	Recruit ratings: Scout: Rivals: 247Sports: ESPN:				
C.J. Bolar; WR	Purvis, Mississippi	Purvis High School	6 ft 2 in (1.88 m)	186 lb (84 kg)	Dec 10, 2017
C.J. Bolar; WR	Recruit ratings: Scout: Rivals: 247Sports: ESPN:				
Tyler Steen; DE	Fort Lauderdale, Florida	St. Thomas Aquinas High School	6 ft 5 in (1.96 m)	300 lb (140 kg)	Dec 20, 2017
Tyler Steen; DE	Recruit ratings: Scout: Rivals: 247Sports: ESPN:				
Elijah McAllister; DE	Rumson, New Jersey	Rumson-Fair Haven Regional High School	6 ft 6 in (1.98 m)	230 lb (100 kg)	Dec 20, 2017
Elijah McAllister; DE	Recruit ratings: Scout: Rivals: 247Sports: ESPN:				
Amir Abdur-Rahman; WR	Atlanta, Georgia	Mays High School	6 ft 4 in (1.93 m)	200 lb (91 kg)	Feb 4, 2018
Amir Abdur-Rahman; WR	Recruit ratings: Scout: Rivals: 247Sports: ESPN:				
BJ Anderson; WR	Andalusia, Alabama	Andalusia High School	6 ft 2 in (1.88 m)	172 lb (78 kg)	Feb 5, 2018
BJ Anderson; WR	Recruit ratings: Scout: Rivals: 247Sports: ESPN:				
Lorenza Surgers; DE	Cary, North Carolina	Panther Creek High School	6 ft 7 in (2.01 m)	225 lb (102 kg)	Feb 5, 2018
Lorenza Surgers; DE	Recruit ratings: Scout: Rivals: 247Sports: ESPN:				
Overall recruit ranking:
Note: In many cases, Scout, Rivals, 247Sports, On3, and ESPN may conflict in their listings of height and weight.; In these cases, the average was taken. ESPN grades are on a 100-point scale.; Sources: "Vanderbilt Football Commitments". Rivals.; "2018 Team Ranking". Rivals.com.

== Preseason ==
=== Award watch lists ===
Listed in the order that they were released

Award	Player	Position	Year
Chuck Bednarik Award	Charles Wright	LB	SR
Maxwell Award	Kyle Shurmur	QB	SR
John Mackey Award	Jared Pinkney	TE	JR
Walter Camp Award	Kyle Shurmur	QB	SR
Johnny Unitas Golden Arm Award	Kyle Shurmur	QB	SR
Manning Award	Kyle Shurmur	QB	SR

=== SEC media poll ===
The SEC media poll was released on July 20, 2018, with the Commodores predicted to finish last in the East Division.

== Schedule ==
Date	Time	Opponent	Site	TV	Result	Attendance
September 1	6:30 p.m.	Middle Tennessee*	Vanderbilt Stadium; Nashville, TN	SECN	W 35–7	25,348
September 8	11:00 a.m.	Nevada*	Vanderbilt Stadium; Nashville, TN	SECN	W 41–10	25,676
September 15	1:30 p.m.	at No. 8 Notre Dame*	Notre Dame Stadium; South Bend, IN	NBC	L 17–22	77,622
September 22	3:00 p.m.	South Carolina	Vanderbilt Stadium; Nashville, TN	SECN	L 14–37	26,078
September 29	3:00 p.m.	Tennessee State*	Vanderbilt Stadium; Nashville, TN	SECN	W 31–27	27,340
October 6	6:30 p.m.	at No. 2 Georgia	Sanford Stadium; Athens, GA (rivalry)	SECN	L 13–41	92,746
October 13	11:00 a.m.	No. 14 Florida	Vanderbilt Stadium; Nashville, TN	ESPN	L 27–37	31,118
October 20	6:30 p.m.	at No. 14 Kentucky	Kroger Field; Lexington, KY (rivalry)	SECN	L 7–14	54,269
October 27	11:00 a.m.	at Arkansas	Donald W. Reynolds Razorback Stadium; Fayetteville, AR	SECN	W 45–31	56,251
November 10	11:00 a.m.	at Missouri	Faurot Field; Columbia, MO	SECN	L 28–33	48,342
November 17	6:30 p.m.	Ole Miss	Vanderbilt Stadium; Nashville, TN (rivalry)	SECN	W 36–29 ^{OT}	24,866
November 24	3:00 p.m.	Tennessee	Vanderbilt Stadium; Nashville, TN (rivalry)	SECN	W 38–13	35,887
December 27	8:00 p.m.	vs. Baylor*	NRG Stadium; Houston, TX (Texas Bowl)	ESPN	L 38–45	51,104
*Non-conference game; Rankings from AP Poll released prior to the game; All times are in Central time

Schedule source:

== Game summaries ==
=== Middle Tennessee ===
	1	2	3	4	Total
Blue Raiders	7	0	0	0	7
Commodores	7	7	7	14	35

Location: Vanderbilt Stadium • Nashville, Tennessee

Scoring summary

Quarter	Time	Drive			Team	Scoring information	Score	
Quarter	Time	Plays	Yards	TOP	Team	Scoring information	MTSU	VAN
1	12:21	5	58	2:39	Commodores	Khari Blasingame 30-yard touchdown run, Ryley Guay kick good	0	7
1	1:59	15	93	6:58	Blue Raiders	CJ Windham 4-yard touchdown reception from Brent Stockstill, Crews Holt kick good	7	7
2	14:01	1	11	0:00	Commodores	Fumble recovery returned 11 yards for touchdown by Dayo Odeyingbo, Guay kick good	7	14
3	7:26	7	92	4:25	Commodores	Chris Pierce 17-yard touchdown reception from Kyle Shurmur, Guay kick good	7	21
4	12:47	12	80	4:56	Commodores	Kalija Lipscomb 28-yard touchdown reception from Shurmur, Guay kick good	7	28
4	1:28	12	80	7:04	Commodores	Jamauri Wakefield 14-yard touchdown run, Guay kick good	7	35
"TOP" = time of possession. For other American football terms, see Glossary of American football.							7	35

Statistics	MTSU	VAN
First downs	21	19
Total yards	294	346
Rushes–yards	116	176
Passing yards	178	170
Passing: Comp–Att–Int	27–37–1	10–17–0
Time of possession	31:09	29:51

Team	Category	Player	Statistics
MTSU	Passing	B. Stockstill	24–36, 178 yards, 1 TD, 1 INT
MTSU	Rushing	T. Thomas	8 carries, 32 yards
MTSU	Receiving	T. Thomas	4 receptions, 42 yards
VAN	Passing	K. Shurmur	10–17, 170 yards, 2 TD
VAN	Rushing	J. Wakefield	10 carries, 56 yards, 1 TD
VAN	Receiving	K. Lipscomb	4 receptions, 60 yards, 1 TD

=== Nevada ===
	1	2	3	4	Total
Wolf Pack	0	10	0	0	10
Commodores	0	17	17	7	41

Location: Vanderbilt Stadium • Nashville, Tennessee

Scoring summary

Quarter	Time	Drive			Team	Scoring information	Score	
Quarter	Time	Plays	Yards	TOP	Team	Scoring information	NEV	VAN
2	13:16	7	53	2:41	Commodores	Kalija Lipscomb 2-yard touchdown reception from Kyle Shurmur, Ryley Guay kick good	0	7
2	12:24	2	7	0:15	Commodores	Ke'Shawn Vaughn 7-yard touchdown run, Guay kick good	0	14
2	3:13	7	13	3:17	Wolf Pack	32-yard field goal by Ramiz Ahmed	3	14
2	3:13	7	48	2:28	Commodores	35-yard field goal by Guay	3	17
2	0:49	10	75	2:24	Wolf Pack	Brendan O'Leary-Orange 9-yard touchdown reception from Ty Gangi, Ahmed kick good	10	17
3	7:14	11	77	6:17	Commodores	25-yard field goal by Guay	10	20
3	6:17	1	46	0:11	Commodores	Vaughn 46-yard touchdown run, Guay kick good	10	27
3	0:23	8	73	4:00	Commodores	Lipscomb 11-yard touchdown reception from Shurmur, Guay kick good	10	34
4	1:10	3	21	1:40	Commodores	Josh Crawford 1-yard touchdown run, Guay kick good	10	41
"TOP" = time of possession. For other American football terms, see Glossary of American football.							10	41

Statistics	NEV	VAN
First downs	14	25
Total yards	250	468
Rushes–yards	34	198
Passing yards	216	270
Passing: Comp–Att–Int	22–39–1–2	24–34–2–0
Time of possession	23:58	36:02

Team	Category	Player	Statistics
NEV	Passing	T. Gangi	22–39, 216 yards, 1 TD, 2 INT
NEV	Rushing	T. Taua	6 carries, 24 yards
NEV	Receiving	M. Mannix	6 receptions, 86 yards
VAN	Passing	K. Shurmur	23–32, 258 yards, 2 TD
VAN	Rushing	K. Vaughn	11 carries, 93 yards, 2 TD
VAN	Receiving	J. Pinkney	4 receptions, 98 yards

=== At Notre Dame ===
	1	2	3	4	Total
Commodores	0	3	7	7	17
No. 8 Fighting Irish	10	6	0	6	22

Location: Notre Dame Stadium • South Bend, Indiana

Scoring summary

Quarter	Time	Drive			Team	Scoring information	Score	
Quarter	Time	Plays	Yards	TOP	Team	Scoring information	VAN	ND
1	11:02	10	74	3:58	Fighting Irish	26-yard field goal by Justin Yoon	0	3
1	0:58	15	94	5:21	Fighting Irish	Brandon Wimbush 12-yard touchdown run, Yoon kick good	0	10
2	7:33	6	49	1:10	Fighting Irish	33-yard field goal by Yoon	0	13
2	1:15	10	51	3:55	Fighting Irish	46-yard field goal by Yoon	0	16
2	0:00	8	72	1:15	Commodores	21-yard field goal by Ryley Guay	3	16
3	0:11	5	47	2:44	Commodores	Ke'Shawn Vaughn 3-yard touchdown run, Guay kick good	10	16
4	11:04	11	75	2:44	Fighting Irish	Nic Weishar -yard touchdown reception from Ian Book, 2-point pass failed	10	22
4	7:22	9	75	3:42	Commodores	Jared Pinkney 18-yard touchdown reception from Kyle Shurmur, Guay kick good	17	22
"TOP" = time of possession. For other American football terms, see Glossary of American football.							17	22

Statistics	ND	VAN
First downs	24	23
Total yards	380	420
Rushes–yards	245	94
Passing yards	135	326
Passing: Comp–Att–Int	16–26–0	26–43–1
Time of possession	29:12	30:48

Team	Category	Player	Statistics
ND	Passing	B. Wimbush	13–23, 122 yards
ND	Rushing	T. Jones Jr.	17 carries, 118 yards
ND	Receiving	T. Jones Jr.	2 receptions, 56 yards
VAN	Passing	K. Shurmur	26–43, 326 yards, 1 TD, 1 INT
VAN	Rushing	K. Vaughn	10 carries, 54 yards, 1 TD
VAN	Receiving	J. Pinkney	5 receptions, 111 yards, 1 TD

=== South Carolina ===
	1	2	3	4	Total
Gamecocks	10	10	10	7	37
Commodores	0	14	0	0	14

Location: Vanderbilt Stadium • Nashville, Tennessee

Scoring summary

Quarter	Time	Drive			Team	Scoring information	Score	
Quarter	Time	Plays	Yards	TOP	Team	Scoring information	SC	VAN
"TOP" = time of possession. For other American football terms, see Glossary of American football.							-	-

Statistics	SC	VAN
First downs		
Total yards		
Rushes–yards		
Passing yards		
Passing: Comp–Att–Int		
Time of possession		

Team	Category	Player	Statistics
SC	Passing	J. Bentley	19–28, 261 yards, 1 TD, 1 INT
SC	Rushing	R. Dowdle	20 carries, 112 yards, 1 TD
SC	Receiving	S. Smith	5 receptions, 119 yards, 1 TD
VAN	Passing	K. Shurmur	18–38, 180 yards, 1 TD, 1 INT
VAN	Rushing	J. Wakefield	14 carries, 72 yards
VAN	Receiving	K. Lipscomb	9 receptions, 72 yards, 1 TD

=== Tennessee State ===
	1	2	3	4	Total
Tigers	0	13	7	7	27
Commodores	0	10	14	7	31

Location: Vanderbilt Stadium • Nashville, Tennessee

Scoring summary

Quarter	Time	Drive			Team	Scoring information	Score	
Quarter	Time	Plays	Yards	TOP	Team	Scoring information	TSU	VAN
"TOP" = time of possession. For other American football terms, see Glossary of American football.							-	-

Statistics	TSU	VAN
First downs		
Total yards		
Rushes–yards		
Passing yards		
Passing: Comp–Att–Int		
Time of possession		

Team	Category	Player	Statistics
TSU	Passing	D. Croft	22–31, 269 yards, 3 TD
TSU	Rushing	D. Croft	9 carries, 41 yards
TSU	Receiving	T. Harris	8 receptions, 109 yards, 1 TD
VAN	Passing	K. Shurmur	22–29, 297 yards, 3 TD, 2 INT
VAN	Rushing	K. Vaughn	17 carries, 146 yards, 1 TD
VAN	Receiving	K. Lipscomb	9 receptions, 174 yards, 2 TD

=== At Georgia ===
	1	2	3	4	Total
Commodores	3	3	0	7	13
No. 2 Bulldogs	7	14	17	3	41

Location: Sanford Stadium • Athens, Georgia

Scoring summary

Quarter	Time	Drive			Team	Scoring information	Score	
Quarter	Time	Plays	Yards	TOP	Team	Scoring information	VAN	UGA
"TOP" = time of possession. For other American football terms, see Glossary of American football.							-	-

Statistics	UGA	VAN
First downs		
Total yards		
Rushes–yards		
Passing yards		
Passing: Comp–Att–Int		
Time of possession		

Team	Category	Player	Statistics
UGA	Passing	J. Fromm	17–23, 276 yards, 3 TD
UGA	Rushing	E. Holyfield	6 carries, 64 yards, 1 TD
UGA	Receiving	T. Godwin	2 receptions, 95 yards, 1 TD
VAN	Passing	K. Shurmur	14–28, 169 yards
VAN	Rushing	K. Vaughn	9 carries, 79 yards
VAN	Receiving	C. J. Bolar	4 receptions, 46 yards

=== Florida ===
	1	2	3	4	Total
No. 14 Gators	0	13	7	17	37
Commodores	7	14	0	6	27

Location: Vanderbilt Stadium • Nashville, Tennessee

Scoring summary

Quarter	Time	Drive			Team	Scoring information	Score	
Quarter	Time	Plays	Yards	TOP	Team	Scoring information	UF	VAN
"TOP" = time of possession. For other American football terms, see Glossary of American football.							-	-

Statistics	UF	VAN
First downs		
Total yards		
Rushes–yards		
Passing yards		
Passing: Comp–Att–Int		
Time of possession		

Team	Category	Player	Statistics
UF	Passing	F. Franks	19–29, 284 yards, 2 TD, 1 INT
UF	Rushing	L. Perine	23 carries, 121 yards, 1 TD
UF	Receiving	L. Perine	4 receptions, 93 yards
VAN	Passing	K. Shurmur	18–36, 229 yards, 2 TD, 1 INT
VAN	Rushing	K. Vaughn	7 carries, 56 yards
VAN	Receiving	K. Vaughn	1 reception, 75 yards, 1 TD

=== At Kentucky ===
	1	2	3	4	Total
Commodores	7	0	0	0	7
No. 14 Wildcats	0	7	0	7	14

Location: Kroger Field • Lexington, Kentucky

Scoring summary

Quarter	Time	Drive			Team	Scoring information	Score	
Quarter	Time	Plays	Yards	TOP	Team	Scoring information	VAN	UK
"TOP" = time of possession. For other American football terms, see Glossary of American football.							-	-

Statistics	UK	VAN
First downs		
Total yards		
Rushes–yards		
Passing yards		
Passing: Comp–Att–Int		
Time of possession		

Team	Category	Player	Statistics
UK	Passing	T. Wilson Jr.	3–9, 18 yards, 1 TD
UK	Rushing	B. Snell	32 carries, 169 yards, 1 TD
UK	Receiving	L. Bowden	3 receptions, 18 yards, 1 TD
VAN	Passing	K. Shurmur	15–23, 216 yards, 1 TD
VAN	Rushing	J. Wakefield	19 carries, 74 yards
VAN	Receiving	C. J. Bolar	2 receptions, 78 yards, 1 TD

=== At Arkansas ===
	1	2	3	4	Total
Commodores	7	14	3	21	45
Razorbacks	7	7	3	14	31

Location: Donald W. Reynolds Razorback Stadium • Fayetteville, Arkansas

Scoring summary

Quarter	Time	Drive			Team	Scoring information	Score	
Quarter	Time	Plays	Yards	TOP	Team	Scoring information	VAN	ARK
"TOP" = time of possession. For other American football terms, see Glossary of American football.							-	-

Statistics	ARK	VAN
First downs		
Total yards		
Rushes–yards		
Passing yards		
Passing: Comp–Att–Int		
Time of possession		

Team	Category	Player	Statistics
ARK	Passing	T. Storey	23–36, 240 yards, 2 TD, 2 INT
ARK	Rushing	R. Boyd	19 carries, 113 yards, 1 TD
ARK	Receiving	C. O'Grady	6 receptions, 83 yards, 1 TD
VAN	Passing	K. Shurmur	13–19, 192 yards, 2 TD
VAN	Rushing	K. Vaughn	26 carries, 172 yards, 3 TD
VAN	Receiving	J. Pinkney	5 receptions, 93 yards, 2 TD

=== At Missouri ===
	1	2	3	4	Total
Commodores	14	7	7	0	28
Tigers	7	6	13	7	33

Location: Faurot Field • Columbia, Missouri

Scoring summary

Quarter	Time	Drive			Team	Scoring information	Score	
Quarter	Time	Plays	Yards	TOP	Team	Scoring information	VAN	MIZ
"TOP" = time of possession. For other American football terms, see Glossary of American football.							-	-

Statistics	MIZ	VAN
First downs		
Total yards		
Rushes–yards		
Passing yards		
Passing: Comp–Att–Int		
Time of possession		

Team	Category	Player	Statistics
MIZ	Passing	D. Lock	22–33, 253 yards, 2 TD, 2 INT
MIZ	Rushing	D. Crockett	22 carries, 122 yards, 1 TD
MIZ	Receiving	D. Gicinto	4 receptions, 81 yards
VAN	Passing	K. Shurmur	24–35, 249 yards, 3 TD
VAN	Rushing	K. Vaughn	15 carries, 182 yards, 1 TD
VAN	Receiving	K. Lipscomb	8 receptions, 99 yards, 1 TD

=== Ole Miss ===
	1	2	3	4	OT	Total
Rebels	3	10	6	10	0	29
Commodores	0	12	14	3	7	36

Location: Vanderbilt Stadium • Nashville, Tennessee

Scoring summary

Quarter	Time	Drive			Team	Scoring information	Score	
Quarter	Time	Plays	Yards	TOP	Team	Scoring information	MISS	VAN
"TOP" = time of possession. For other American football terms, see Glossary of American football.							-	-

Statistics	MISS	VAN
First downs		
Total yards		
Rushes–yards		
Passing yards		
Passing: Comp–Att–Int		
Time of possession		

Team	Category	Player	Statistics
MISS	Passing	J. Ta'amu	32–52, 457 yards, 2 TD, 2 INT
MISS	Rushing	I. Woullard	16 carries, 107 yards
MISS	Receiving	A. Brown	9 receptions, 212 yards
VAN	Passing	K. Shurmur	22–34, 191 yards, 3 TD, 1 INT
VAN	Rushing	K. Vaughn	25 carries, 127 yards
VAN	Receiving	J. Pinkney	6 receptions, 85 yards

=== Tennessee ===
	1	2	3	4	Total
Volunteers	0	0	7	6	13
Commodores	7	10	0	21	38

Location: Vanderbilt Stadium • Nashville, Tennessee

Team	Category	Player	Statistics
TENN	Passing	J. Guarantano	13–29, 139 yards, 1 TD, 1 INT
TENN	Rushing	T. Chandler	7 carries, 88 yards, 1 TD
TENN	Receiving	J. Jennings	2 receptions, 51 yards
VAN	Passing	K. Shurmur	31–35, 367 yards, 3 TD
VAN	Rushing	K. Blasingame	20 carries, 70 yards, 1 TD
VAN	Receiving	C. J. Bolar	6 receptions, 93 yards

=== Baylor–Texas Bowl ===
	1	2	3	4	Total
Bears	10	7	14	14	45
Commodores	14	7	7	10	38

Location: NRG Stadium • Houston, TX

Scoring summary

Quarter	Time	Drive			Team	Scoring information	Score	
Quarter	Time	Plays	Yards	TOP	Team	Scoring information	BAY	VAN
"TOP" = time of possession. For other American football terms, see Glossary of American football.							-	-

Statistics	BAY	VAN
First downs		
Total yards		
Rushes–yards		
Passing yards		
Passing: Comp–Att–Int		
Time of possession		

Team	Category	Player	Statistics
BAY	Passing	C. Brewer	21–34, 384 yards, 2 TD, 1 INT
BAY	Rushing	C. Brewer	16 carries, 109 yards
BAY	Receiving	T. Ebner	3 receptions, 109 yards, 1 TD
VAN	Passing	K. Shurmur	18–37, 286 yards, 1 TD
VAN	Rushing	K. Vaughn	13 carries, 243 yards, 2 TD
VAN	Receiving	K. Blasingame	3 receptions, 85 yards, 1 TD

== Players drafted into the NFL ==
Round	Pick	Player	Position	NFL Club
2	45	Joejuan Williams	CB	New England Patriots
6	183	Justin Skule	OT	San Francisco 49ers
