= 2018 Texas Bowl =

College football bowl game

2018 Academy Sports + Outdoors Texas Bowl
- 13th Texas Bowl
Baylor Bears	Vanderbilt Commodores
(6–6)	(6–6)
Big 12	SEC
45	38
Head coach: Matt Rhule	Head coach: Derek Mason
	1	2	3	4	Total
Baylor	10	7	14	14	45
Vanderbilt	14	7	7	10	38
- Date: December 27, 2018
- Season: 2018
- Stadium: NRG Stadium
- Location: Houston, Texas
- MVP: Charlie Brewer (QB, Baylor)
- Favorite: Vanderbilt by 3.5
- Referee: Gary Patterson (ACC)
- Attendance: 51,104
- Payout: US$6,300,000

United States TV coverage
- Network: ESPN & ESPN Radio
- Announcers: Tom Hart, Jordan Rodgers and Cole Cubelic (ESPN); Bill Rosinski, David Norrie and Ian Fitzsimmons (ESPN Radio)

International TV coverage
- Network: ESPN Deportes

The 2018 Texas Bowl was a college football bowl game that was played on December 27, 2018, with kickoff at 9:00 p.m. EST. It was the 13th edition of the Texas Bowl, and was one of the 2018–19 bowl games concluding the 2018 FBS football season. Sponsored by the Academy Sports + Outdoors sporting goods company, the game was officially known as the Academy Sports + Outdoors Texas Bowl.

The 2018 Texas Bowl featured the Baylor Bears of the Big 12 Conference and the Vanderbilt Commodores of the Southeastern Conference. Both teams had a 6–6 record coming in to the game, making the Texas Bowl the only bowl game of the season without a team with a winning record. Despite featuring a pair of .500 teams, fans were treated to one of the highest-scoring games of the bowl season that included five touchdown plays of 50 yards or more, and more than 1,200 yards (combined) of total offense.

== Teams ==
The matchup of Baylor from the Big 12 Conference and Vanderbilt from the Southeastern Conference (SEC) was announced on December 2. The teams had previously met twice, with Baylor winning both games, played in 1953 and 1954.

=== Baylor Bears ===
Baylor received and accepted a bid to the Texas Bowl on December 2. The Bears entered the bowl with a 6–6 record (4–5 in conference).

=== Vanderbilt Commodores ===
Vanderbilt received and accepted a bid to the Texas Bowl on December 2. The Commodores entered the bowl with a 6–6 record (3–5 in conference).

== Game summary ==
=== Scoring summary ===
Scoring summary

Quarter	Time	Drive			Team	Scoring information	Score	
Quarter	Time	Plays	Yards	TOP	Team	Scoring information	BAY	VAN
1	14:04	3	65	0:56	VAN	Khari Blasingame 65-yard touchdown reception from Kyle Shurmur, Ryley Guay kick good	0	7
1	9:16	12	69	4:48	BAY	23-yard field goal by Connor Martin	3	7
1	2:19	9	73	4:35	BAY	John Lovett 12-yard touchdown run, Connor Martin kick good	10	7
1	0:23	4	81	1:56	VAN	Ke'Shawn Vaughn 68-yard touchdown run, Ryley Guay kick good	10	14
2	11:33	8	75	3:50	BAY	JaMycal Hasty 18-yard touchdown run, Connor Martin kick good	17	14
2	9:57	3	81	1:36	VAN	Ke'Shawn Vaughn 69-yard touchdown run, Ryley Guay kick good	17	21
3	12:54	6	75	2:06	BAY	Trestan Ebner 34-yard touchdown run, Connor Martin kick good	24	21
3	4:51	10	88	3:42	BAY	Charlie Brewer 1-yard touchdown run, John Mayers kick good	31	21
3	0:16	3	54	1:24	VAN	Khari Blasingame 2-yard touchdown run, Ryley Guay kick good	31	28
4	9:31	3	80	1:00	VAN	Khari Blasingame 1-yard touchdown run, Ryley Guay kick good	31	35
4	9:19	1	75	0:12	BAY	Trestan Ebner 75-yard touchdown reception from Charlie Brewer, John Mayers kick good	38	35
4	3:30	13	59	5:49	VAN	33-yard field goal by Ryley Guay	38	38
4	1:50	4	75	1:40	BAY	Marques Jones 52-yard touchdown reception from Charlie Brewer, John Mayers kick good	45	38
"TOP" = time of possession. For other American football terms, see Glossary of American football.							45	38

=== Statistics ===
	1	2	3	4	Total
Bears	10	7	14	14	45
Commodores	14	7	7	10	38

Statistics	BAY	VAN
First downs	30	22
Plays–yards	81–668	62–573
Rushes–yards	46–284	24–287
Passing yards	384	286
Passing: comp–att–int	21–35–1	18–38–0
Time of possession	35:26	24:34

Team	Category	Player	Statistics
Baylor	Passing	Charlie Brewer	21/34, 384 yds, 2 TD, 1 INT
Baylor	Rushing	Charlie Brewer	16 car, 109 yds, 1 TD
Baylor	Receiving	Trestan Ebner	3 rec, 109 yds, 1 TD
Vanderbilt	Passing	Kyle Shurmur	18/37, 286 yds, 1 TD
Vanderbilt	Rushing	Ke'Shawn Vaughn	13 car, 243 yds, 2 TD
Vanderbilt	Receiving	Khari Blasingame	3 rec, 85 yds, 1 TD
