= 2018 Ole Miss Rebels football team =

American college football season

2018 Ole Miss Rebels football
- Conference: Southeastern Conference
- Western Division
- Record: 5–7 (1–7 SEC)
- Head coach: Matt Luke (2nd season)
- Offensive coordinator: Phil Longo (2nd season)
- Offensive scheme: Air raid
- Defensive coordinator: Wesley McGriff (3rd season)
- Co-defensive coordinator: Jason Jones (6th season)
- Base defense: Multiple
- Home stadium: Vaught–Hemingway Stadium

2018 Southeastern Conference football standings
	Conf.			Overall
Team	W		L	W		L
Eastern Division
No. T–7 Georgia x	7	–	1	11	–	3
No. 12 Kentucky	5	–	3	10	–	3
No. T–7 Florida	5	–	3	10	–	3
South Carolina	4	–	4	7	–	6
Missouri	4	–	4	8	–	5
Vanderbilt	3	–	5	6	–	7
Tennessee	2	–	6	5	–	7
Western Division
No. 2 Alabama x$^	8	–	0	14	–	1
No. 16 Texas A&M	5	–	3	9	–	4
No. 6 LSU	5	–	3	10	–	3
Mississippi State*	4	–	4	8	–	5
Auburn	3	–	5	8	–	5
Ole Miss	1	–	7	5	–	7
Arkansas	0	–	8	2	–	10
Championship: Alabama 35, Georgia 28
^ – College Football Playoff participant; $ – Conference champion; x – Division champion/co-champions; * Mississippi State vacated four conference and eight total wins due to NCAA violations.; Rankings from AP Poll

The 2018 Ole Miss Rebels football team represented the University of Mississippi in the 2018 NCAA Division I FBS football season. The Rebels played their home games at Vaught-Hemingway Stadium in Oxford, Mississippi and competed in the Western Division of the Southeastern Conference (SEC). They were led by second-year head coach Matt Luke. They finished the season 5–7, 1–7 in SEC play to finish in sixth place in the Western Division.

On December 1, 2017, the University of Mississippi was dealt multiple sanctions by the NCAA, including a two-year postseason ban. As Ole Miss already self-imposed a post-season ban during the 2017 season, 2018 will be the last season without post-season play due to the sanctions. On February 5, 2018, the university submitted a written appeal to the NCAA regarding the penalties, stating: “This Committee should vacate and reverse the penalties and factual findings, because the COI (Committee of Infractions) abused its discretion, departed from precedent, committed procedural errors, and reached factual conclusions inconsistent with the evidence.”

== Preseason ==
=== Award watch lists ===
Listed in the order that they were released

Award	Player	Position	Year
Rimington Trophy	Sean Rawlings	C	SR
Maxwell Award	A. J. Brown	WR	JR
Fred Biletnikoff Award	A. J. Brown	WR	JR
John Mackey Award	Dawson Knox	TE	JR
Outland Trophy	Greg Little	OL	JR
Wuerffel Trophy	Javon Patterson	OL	SR
Walter Camp Award	A. J. Brown	WR	JR
Johnny Unitas Golden Arm Award	Jordan Ta'amu	QB	SR
Polynesian College Football Player of the Year	Jordan Ta'amu	QB	SR
Earl Campbell Tyler Rose Award	Greg Little	OL	JR

=== SEC media poll ===
The SEC media poll was released on July 20, 2018, with the Rebels predicted to finish in sixth place.

=== Preseason All-SEC teams ===
The Rebels had three players selected to the preseason all-SEC teams.

Offense

1st team

A. J. Brown – WR

Greg Little – OL

3rd team

Javon Patterson – OL

=== Recruiting ===
The Rebels’ 2018 recruiting class was ranked 32nd in the nation and 10th in the SEC by 247Sports.

College recruiting
Name	Hometown	School	Height	Weight	Commit date
Matt Corral; QB	Long Beach, CA	Long Beach Poly	6 ft 2 in (1.88 m)	185 lb (84 kg)	Dec 14, 2017
Matt Corral; QB	Recruit ratings: Scout: Rivals: 247Sports: ESPN:				
Elijah Moore; WR	Fort Lauderdale, FL	St. Thomas Aquinas	5 ft 11 in (1.80 m)	181 lb (82 kg)	Dec 20, 2017
Elijah Moore; WR	Recruit ratings: Scout: Rivals: 247Sports: ESPN:				
Miles Battle; WR	Houston, TX	Cy Creek	6 ft 4 in (1.93 m)	188 lb (85 kg)	Feb 5, 2018
Miles Battle; WR	Recruit ratings: Scout: Rivals: 247Sports: ESPN:				
Jalen Cunningham; DT	Odenville, AL	St. Clair County	6 ft 6 in (1.98 m)	345 lb (156 kg)	Dec 20, 2017
Jalen Cunningham; DT	Recruit ratings: Scout: Rivals: 247Sports: ESPN:				
Kevontae' Ruggs; OLB	Montgomery, AL	Robert E. Lee	6 ft 4 in (1.93 m)	210 lb (95 kg)	Jan 28, 2018
Kevontae' Ruggs; OLB	Recruit ratings: Scout: Rivals: 247Sports: ESPN:				
Demarcus Gregory; WR	Duncan, SC	Byrnes	6 ft 3 in (1.91 m)	204 lb (93 kg)	May 28, 2017
Demarcus Gregory; WR	Recruit ratings: Scout: Rivals: 247Sports: ESPN:				
Scottie Phillips; RB	Ellisville, MS	Jones County J.C.	5 ft 9 in (1.75 m)	205 lb (93 kg)	Jul 1, 2017
Scottie Phillips; RB	Recruit ratings: Scout: Rivals: 247Sports: ESPN:				
Vernon Dasher; OLB	Baxley, GA	Coffeyville C.C.	6 ft 3 in (1.91 m)	215 lb (98 kg)	Dec 20, 2017
Vernon Dasher; OLB	Recruit ratings: Scout: Rivals: 247Sports: ESPN:				
Jacquez Jones; OLB	Tuscaloosa, AL	Hillcrest	6 ft .5 in (1.84 m)	225 lb (102 kg)	Sep 8, 2017
Jacquez Jones; OLB	Recruit ratings: Scout: Rivals: 247Sports: ESPN:				
Hal Northern; DT	Senatobia, MS	Northwest Mississippi C.C.	6 ft 3 in (1.91 m)	293 lb (133 kg)	Oct 5, 2017
Hal Northern; DT	Recruit ratings: Scout: Rivals: 247Sports: ESPN:				
Ka'Darian Hill; DT	Eufaula, AL	Eufaula	6 ft 1 in (1.85 m)	270 lb (120 kg)	Jun 5, 2017
Ka'Darian Hill; DT	Recruit ratings: Scout: Rivals: 247Sports: ESPN:				
Cameron White; S	Madison, MS	Madison Central	6 ft 1 in (1.85 m)	185 lb (84 kg)	Dec 8, 2017
Cameron White; S	Recruit ratings: Scout: Rivals: 247Sports: ESPN:				
Hamilton Hall; OT	Atlanta, GA	Chamblee Charter	6 ft 5 in (1.96 m)	315 lb (143 kg)	Jan 29, 2018
Hamilton Hall; OT	Recruit ratings: Scout: Rivals: 247Sports: ESPN:				
JaKorey Hawkins; CB	Montgomery, AL	Robert E. Lee	5 ft 11 in (1.80 m)	187 lb (85 kg)	Oct 25, 2017
JaKorey Hawkins; CB	Recruit ratings: Scout: Rivals: 247Sports: ESPN:				
Tariqious Tisdale; DE	Lexington, TN	Northwest Mississippi C.C.	6 ft 5 in (1.96 m)	280 lb (130 kg)	Feb 8, 2018
Tariqious Tisdale; DE	Recruit ratings: Scout: Rivals: 247Sports: ESPN:				
Quentin Bivens; DT	Waynesboro, MS	Wayne County	6 ft 3 in (1.91 m)	295 lb (134 kg)	Apr 29, 2017
Quentin Bivens; DT	Recruit ratings: Scout: Rivals: 247Sports: ESPN:				
Keidron Smith; CB	West Palm Beach, FL	Oxbridge Academy	6 ft 2 in (1.88 m)	180 lb (82 kg)	Nov 26, 2017
Keidron Smith; CB	Recruit ratings: Scout: Rivals: 247Sports: ESPN:				
Jonathan Hess; OLB	Birmingham, AL	Vestavia Hills	6 ft 5 in (1.96 m)	223 lb (101 kg)	Jun 21, 2017
Jonathan Hess; OLB	Recruit ratings: Scout: Rivals: 247Sports: ESPN:				
Luke Knox; OLB	Brentwood, TN	Brentwood Academy	6 ft 3 in (1.91 m)	220 lb (100 kg)	Feb 6, 2018
Luke Knox; OLB	Recruit ratings: Scout: Rivals: 247Sports: ESPN:				
Tylan Knight; CB	Pearl, MS	Pearl	5 ft 7 in (1.70 m)	173 lb (78 kg)	Feb 7, 2018
Tylan Knight; CB	Recruit ratings: Scout: Rivals: 247Sports: ESPN:				
Overall recruit ranking:
Note: In many cases, Scout, Rivals, 247Sports, On3, and ESPN may conflict in their listings of height and weight.; In these cases, the average was taken. ESPN grades are on a 100-point scale.; Sources: "2018 Team Ranking". Rivals.com.

== Schedule ==
Ole Miss announced its 2018 football schedule on September 19, 2017. The 2018 schedule consists of 7 home and 5 away games in the regular season. The Rebels will host SEC foes Alabama, Auburn, South Carolina, and Mississippi State, and will travel to LSU, Arkansas (game played in Little Rock), Texas A&M, and Vanderbilt.

The Rebels will be hosting three of their four non-conference opponents, hosting Southern Illinois (FCS), Kent State from the Mid-American Conference, Louisiana–Monroe from the Sun Belt Conference, and will then travel to Houston for their neutral site season opener against Texas Tech from the Big 12 Conference, which is the 2018 edition of the AdvoCare Texas Kickoff.

Date	Time	Opponent	Site	TV	Result	Attendance
September 1	11:00 a.m.	vs. Texas Tech*	NRG Stadium; Houston, TX (AdvoCare Texas Kickoff)	ESPN	W 47–27	40,333
September 8	3:00 p.m.	Southern Illinois*	Vaught–Hemingway Stadium; Oxford, MS	SECN	W 76–41	53,339
September 15	6:00 p.m.	No. 1 Alabama	Vaught–Hemingway Stadium; Oxford, MS (rivalry / SEC Nation)	ESPN	L 7–62	62,919
September 22	11:00 a.m.	Kent State*	Vaught–Hemingway Stadium; Oxford, MS	SECN	W 38–17	50,417
September 29	8:00 p.m.	at No. 5 LSU	Tiger Stadium; Baton Rouge, LA (Magnolia Bowl)	ESPN	L 16–45	100,224
October 6	3:00 p.m.	Louisiana–Monroe*^{†}	Vaught–Hemingway Stadium; Oxford, MS	SECN	W 70–21	52,875
October 13	6:30 p.m.	at Arkansas	War Memorial Stadium; Little Rock, AR (rivalry)	SECN	W 37–33	51,438
October 20	11:00 a.m.	Auburn	Vaught–Hemingway Stadium; Oxford, MS (rivalry)	ESPN	L 16–31	56,885
November 3	11:00 a.m.	South Carolina	Vaught–Hemingway Stadium; Oxford, MS	SECN	L 44–48	56,798
November 10	11:00 a.m.	at Texas A&M	Kyle Field; College Station, TX	CBS	L 24–38	102,618
November 17	6:30 p.m.	at Vanderbilt	Vanderbilt Stadium; Nashville, TN (rivalry)	SECN	L 29–36 ^{OT}	24,866
November 22	6:30 p.m.	No. 18 Mississippi State	Vaught–Hemingway Stadium; Oxford, MS (Egg Bowl)	ESPN	L 3–35	56,561
*Non-conference game; ^{†}Homecoming; Rankings from AP Poll released prior to the game; All times are in Central time

Schedule source:

== Personnel ==
=== Coaching staff ===
Name	Position	Year at Ole Miss	Alma mater (Year)
Matt Luke	Head Coach	2nd	Ole Miss (2000)
Wesley McGriff	Associate head coach/co-defensive coordinator/linebackers	2nd	Savannah State (1990)
Phil Longo	Offensive coordinator/quarterbacks	2nd	Rowan University (1992)
Jason Jones	Co-defensive coordinator/safeties	6th	Alabama (2001)
Jack Bicknell Jr.	Offensive line	2nd	Boston College (1985)
Maurice Harris	Tight ends/recruiting coordinator	7th	Arkansas State (1998)
Jacob Peeler	Wide receivers	2nd	Louisiana Tech (2007)
Derrick Nix	Running backs	11th	Southern Miss (2002)
Jon Sumrall	Linebackers	1st	Kentucky (2004)
Freddie Roach	Defensive line	2nd	Alabama (2008)
Charles Clark	Cornerbacks	1st	Ole Miss (2007)

== Game summaries ==
=== Vs. Texas Tech (Texas Kickoff) ===
Game One – Ole Miss Rebels (0–0) vs Texas Tech Red Raiders (0–0)

Quarter	1	2	3	4	Total
Rebels	24	6	7	10	47
Red Raiders	7	10	10	0	27

at NRG Stadium • Houston, Texas

- Date: September 1
- Game time: 11:00 a.m. CDT
- Game weather: None (retractable roof closed)
- Game attendance: 40,333
- Referee: Jerry Magallanes
- TV announcers (ESPN): Mark Jones (play-by-play), Dusty Dvoracek (color), and Molly McGrath (sideline)

Game information

First Quarter

- (14:27) MISS - DK Metcalf 58 yard pass from Jordan Ta'amu, Luke Logan kick
  Ole Miss 7-0; 2 plays, 69 yards, 0:33
- (10:32) TTU - Da'Leon Ward 15 yard rush, Clayton Hatfield kick
  Tied 7-7; 10 plays, 90 yards, 3:55
- (10:17) MISS - Jaylon Jones 94 yard kickoff return, Luke Logan kick
  Ole Miss 14-7
- (4:30) MISS - Luke Logan 24 yard FG
  Ole Miss 17-7; 14 plays, 65 yards, 4:42
- (1:08) MISS - Scottie Phillips 39 yard rush, Luke Logan kick
  Ole Miss 24-7; 5 plays, 60 yards, 1:49

Second Quarter

- (12:17) TTU - Clayton Hatfield 25 yard FG
  Ole Miss 24-10; 9 plays, 42 yards, 3:51
- (6:41) MISS - Luke Logan 29 yard FG
  Ole Miss 27-10; 8 plays, 53 yards, 3:35
- (1:57) TTU - Ja'Deion High 14 yard pass from Alan Bowman, Clayton Hatfield kick
  Ole Miss 27-17; 11 plays, 75 yards, 4:44
- (0:37) MISS - Luke Logan 39 yard FG
  Ole Miss 30-17; 8 plays, 47 yards, 1:20

Third Quarter

- (7:57) TTU - Clayton Hatfield 41 yard FG
  Ole Miss 30-20; 11 plays, 65 yards, 3:50
- (7:07) MISS - Scottie Phillips 65 yard rush, Luke Logan kick
  Ole Miss 37-20; 3 plays, 75 yards, 0:50
- (5:30) TTU - Da'Leon Ward 9 yard rush, Clayton Hatfield kick
  Ole Miss 37-27; 5 plays, 75 yards, 1:37

Fourth Quarter

- (14:33) MISS - A. J. Brown 34 yard pass from Jordan Ta'amu, Luke Logan kick
  Ole Miss 44-27; 2 plays, 54 yards, 0:20
- (4:09) MISS - Luke Logan 23 yard FG
  Ole Miss 47-27; 8 plays, 80 yards, 5:02

Top Passers

- MISS – Jordan Ta'amu: 22/32, 336 yards, 2 TD
- TTU – Alan Bowman: 29/49, 273 yards, 1 TD

Top Rushers

- MISS – Scottie Phillips: 16 carries, 204 yards, 2 TD
- TTU – Da'Leon Ward: 17 carries, 90 yards, 2 TD

Top Receivers

- MISS – DaMarkus Lodge: 6 receptions, 96 yards
- TTU – T. J. Vasher: 4 receptions, 66 yards

=== Southern Illinois ===
Game Two – Southern Illinois Salukis (1-0) at Ole Miss Rebels (1-0)

Quarter	1	2	3	4	Total
Salukis	21	17	3	0	41
Rebels	14	21	14	27	76

at Vaught–Hemingway Stadium • Oxford, Mississippi

- Date: September 8
- Game time: 3:00 p.m. CDT
- Game weather: Sunny • Temperature: 88 °F (31 °C)
- Game attendance: 53,339
- Referee: Lee Hedrick
- TV announcers (SEC Network): Mike Morgan (play-by-play), John Congemi (color), and Alyssa Lang (sideline)

Game information

First Quarter

- (13:04) SIU - Nigel Kilby 9 yard pass from Sam Straub, Nico Gualdoni kick
  Southern Illinois 7-0; 5 plays, 56 yards, 0:50
- (9:57) MISS - Scottie Phillips 7 yard rush, Luke Logan kick
  Tied 7-7; 11 plays, 65 yards, 3:07
- (6:32) SIU - Landon Lenoir 7 yard pass from Sam Straub, Nico Gualdoni kick
  Southern Illinois 14-7; 6 plays, 75 yards, 3:25
- (5:31) MISS - Braylon Sanders 30 yard pass from Jordan Ta'amu, Luke Logan kick
  Tied 14-14; 3 plays, 81 yards, 0:55
- (1:01) SIU - Sam Straub 2 yard rush, Nico Gualdoni kick
  Southern Illinois 21-14; 10 plays, 75 yards, 4:30

Second Quarter

- (14:52) MISS - Elijah Moore 50 yard pass from Jordan Ta'amu, Luke Logan kick
  Tied 21-21; 4 plays, 87 yards, 1:04
- (8:12) SIU - Nico Gualdoni 22 yard FG
  Southern Illinois 24-21; 14 plays, 70 yards, 6:34
- (6:40) MISS - A. J. Brown 38 yard pass from Jordan Ta'amu, Luke Logan kick
  Ole Miss 28-24; 5 plays 75 yards, 1:32
- (4:06) SIU - Raphael Leonard 9 yard pass from Sam Straub, Nico Gualdoni kick
  Southern Illinois 31-28; 6 plays, 75 yards, 2:34
- (1:17) MISS - Scottie Phillips 6 yard rush, Luke Logan kick
  Ole Miss 35-31; 10 plays, 75 yards, 2:49
- (0:49) SIU - Raphael Leonard 70 yard pass from Sam Straub, Nico Gualdoni kick
  Southern Illinois 38-35; 3 plays, 75 yards, 0:28

Third Quarter

- (11:22) MISS - A. J. Brown 46 yard pass from Jordan Ta’amu, Luke Logan kick
  Ole Miss 42-38; 2 plays, 59 yards, 0:24
- (5:00) SIU - Nico Gualdoni 26 yard FG
  Ole Miss 42-41; 8 plays, 35 yards, 3:02
- (3:48) MISS - DK Metcalf 5 yard pass from Jordan Ta’amu, Luke Logan kick
  Ole Miss 49-41; 5 plays, 75 yards, 1:12

Fourth Quarter

- (14:42) MISS - Vernon Dasher 88 yard interception return from Sam Straub, PAT missed
  Ole Miss 55-41
- (12:00) MISS - Isaiah Woullard 2 yard rush, Isaac Way kick
  Ole Miss 62-41; 7 plays, 52 yards, 1:36
- (9:34) MISS - Victor Evans 56 yard fumble return, Luke Logan kick
  Ole Miss 69-41
- (1:42) MISS - Matt Corral 1 yard rush, Patrick Nasiatka kick
  Ole Miss 76-41; 10 plays, 70 yards, 5:51

Top Passers

- SIU – Sam Straub: 29/47, 382 yards, 4 TD, 2 INT
- MISS – Jordan Ta'amu: 23/33, 448 yards, 5 TD

Top Rushers

- SIU – D. J. Davis: 16 carries, 121 yards
- MISS – Scottie Phillips: 15 carries, 107 yards, 2 TD

Top Receivers

- SIU – Raphael Leonard: 6 receptions, 117 yards, 2 TD
- MISS – A. J. Brown: 8 receptions, 158 yards, 2 TD

=== No. 1 Alabama ===
Game Three – No. 1 Alabama Crimson Tide (2–0) at Ole Miss Rebels (2–0)

Quarter	1	2	3	4	Total
No. 1 Crimson Tide	28	21	10	3	62
Rebels	7	0	0	0	7

at Vaught–Hemingway Stadium • Oxford, Mississippi

- Date: September 15
- Game time: 6:00 p.m. CDT
- Game weather: Clear • Temperature: 92 °F (33 °C)
- Game attendance: 62,919
- Referee: Hubert Owens
- TV announcers (ESPN):
  Sean McDonough (play-by-play), Todd Blackledge (color), and Holly Rowe (sideline)

Game information

First Quarter

- (14:49) MISS – DK Metcalf 75 yard pass from Jordan Ta'amu, Luke Logan kick
  Ole Miss 7–0; 1 play, 75 yards, 0:11
- (13:39) ALA – Damien Harris 43 yard rush, Joseph Bulovas kick
  Tied 7–7; 3 plays, 72 yards, 1:10
- (9:51) ALA - Jerry Jeudy 79 yard pass from Tua Tagovailoa, Joseph Bulovas kick
  Alabama 14-7; 3 plays, 80 yards, 0:59
- (5:43) ALA - Najee Harris 10 yard rush, Joseph Bulovas kick
  Alabama 21-7; 6 plays, 62 yards, 2:26
- (4:40) ALA - Irv Smith Jr. 12 yard pass from Tua Tagovailoa, Joseph Bulovas kick
  Alabama 28-7; 3 plays, 15 yards, 0:50

Second Quarter

- (7:18) ALA – Josh Jacobs 4 yard rush, Joseph Bulovas kick
  Alabama 35-7; 4 plays, 52 yards, 1:44
- (4:36) ALA - Jerry Jeudy 22 yard pass from Jalen Hurts, Joseph Bulovas kick
  Alabama 42-7; 3 plays, 30 yards, 0:54
- (0:55) ALA - Henry Ruggs 13 yard pass from Jalen Hurts, Joseph Bulovas kick
  Alabama 49-7; 7 plays, 50 yards, 1:52

Third Quarter

- (11:49) ALA – Joseph Bulovas 20 yard FG
  Alabama 52-7; 7 plays, 21 yards, 3:11
- (5:04) ALA - Xavier McKinney 30 yard interception return, Joseph Bulovas kick
  Alabama 59-7

Fourth Quarter

- (12:16) ALA – Joseph Bulovas 44 yard FG
  Alabama 62-7; 13 plays, 46 yards, 6:16

Top Passers

- ALA – Tua Tagovailoa: 11/15, 191 yards, 2 TD
- MISS – Jordan Ta'amu: 7/22, 133 yards, 1 TD, 2 INT

Top Rushers

- ALA – Damien Harris: 5 carries, 62 yards, 1 TD
- MISS – Scottie Phillips: 12 carries, 44 yards

Top Receivers

- ALA – Jerry Jeudy: 3 receptions, 136 yards, 2 TD
- MISS – DK Metcalf: 2 receptions, 92 yards, 1 TD

=== Kent State ===
Game Four – Kent State Golden Flashes (1–2) at Ole Miss Rebels (2–1)

Quarter	1	2	3	4	Total
Golden Flashes	0	7	10	0	17
Rebels	7	0	17	14	38

at Vaught-Hemingway Stadium • Oxford, MS

- Date: Saturday, September 22, 2018
- Game time: 11:00 a.m. CDT
- Game weather: Scattered Showers • Temperature: 80 °F (27 °C)
- Game attendance: 50,417
- Referee: John McDaid
- TV announcers (SEC Network):
  Dave Neal (play-by-play)
  D.J. Shockley (color)
  Dawn Davenport (sideline)

Game information

First Quarter

- (11:20) MISS – Scottie Phillips 38 yard pass from Jordan Ta'amu, Luke Logan kick
  Ole Miss 7–0; 6 plays, 77 yards, 1:41

Second Quarter

- (12:28) KENT – Jo-El Shaw 18 yard pass from Kavious Price, Matthew Trickett kick
  Tied 7-7; 5 plays, 85 yards, 1:23

Third Quarter

- (13:20) MISS - Scottie Phillips 2 yard rush, Luke Logan kick
  Ole Miss 14-7; 5 plays, 76 yards, 1:35
- (11:00) KENT - Matthew Trickett 32 yard FG
  Ole Miss 14-10; 8 plays, 50 yards, 2:20
- (10:18) MISS - DK Metcalf 41 yard pass from Jordan Ta'amu, Luke Logan kick
  Ole Miss 21-10; 2 plays, 71 yards, 0:32
- (6:45) KENT - Woody Barrett 2 yard rush, Matthew Trickett kick
  Ole Miss 21-17; 11 plays, 53 yards, 3:23
- (0:03) MISS - Luke Logan 27 yard FG
  Ole Miss 24-17; 13 plays, 65 yards, 4:42

Fourth Quarter

- (9:55) MISS - Jordan Ta'amu 4 yard rush, Luke Logan kick
  Ole Miss 31-17; 7 plays, 88 yards, 2:40
- (7:06) MISS - Isaiah Woullard 7 yard rush, Luke Logan kick
  Ole Miss 38-17; 5 plays, 34 yards, 2:19

Top Passers

- KENT – Woody Barrett: 24/42, 224 yards, 1 INT
- MISS – Jordan Ta'amu: 28/38, 442 yards, 2 TD, 1 INT

Top Rushers

- KENT – Justin Rankin: 15 carries, 64 yards
- MISS – Scottie Phillips: 19 carries, 112 yards, 1 TD

Top Receivers

- KENT – Mike Carrigan: 6 receptions, 88 yards
- MISS – DK Metcalf: 5 receptions, 102 yards, 1 TD

=== At No. 5 LSU ===
Game Five – Ole Miss Rebels (3–1) at No. 5 LSU Tigers (4–0)

Quarter	1	2	3	4	Total
Rebels	3	3	7	3	16
No. 5 Tigers	14	14	7	10	45

at Tiger Stadium • Baton Rouge, LA

- Date: Saturday, September 29, 2018
- Game time: 8:00 p.m. CDT
- Game weather: Scattered Showers • Temperature: 77 °F (25 °C)
- Game attendance: 100,224
- Referee: Ken Williamson
- TV announcers (ESPN): Steve Levy (play-by-play), Brian Griese (color), and Todd McShay (sideline)

Game information

First Quarter

- (9:06) MISS - Luke Logan 30 yard FG
  Ole Miss 3-0; 9 plays, 52 yards, 2:56
- (5:59) LSU - Ja'Marr Chase 21 yard pass from Joe Burrow, Cole Tracy kick
  LSU 7-3; 6 plays, 81 yards, 3:07
- (0:57) LSU - Nick Brossette 4 yard rush, Cole Tracy kick
  LSU 14-3; 9 plays, 71 yards, 3:55

Second Quarter

- (8:59) LSU - Clyde Edwards-Helaire 3 yard rush, Cole Tracy kick
  LSU 21-3; 12 plays, 83 yards, 5:48
- (7:41) LSU - Justin Jefferson 65 yard pass from Joe Burrow, Cole Tracy kick
  LSU 28-3; 2 plays, 69 yards, 0:45
- (0:02) MISS - Luke Logan 17 yard FG
  LSU 28-6; 12 plays, 90 yards, 2:34

Third Quarter

- (3:45) MISS - Scottie Phillips 1 yard rush, Luke Logan kick
  LSU 28-13; 13 plays, 59 yards, 4:31
- (1:48) LSU - Justin Jefferson 5 yard pass from Joe Burrow, Cole Tracy kick
  LSU 35-13; 5 plays, 67 yards, 1:57

Fourth Quarter

- (13:10) MISS - Luke Logan 40 yard FG
  LSU 35-16; 11 plays, 51 yards, 3:38
- (8:45) LSU - Cole Tracy 26 yard FG
  LSU 38-16; 10 plays, 67 yards, 4:25
- (2:56) LSU - Joe Burrow 35 yard rush, Cole Tracy kick
  LSU 45-16; 6 plays, 64 yards, 4:00

Top Passers

- MISS – Jordan Ta'amu: 19/38, 178 yards, 1 INT
- LSU – Joe Burrow: 18/25, 292 yards, 3 TD

Top Rushers

- MISS – Scottie Phillips: 16 carries, 96 yards, 1 TD
- LSU – Joe Burrow: 9 carries, 96 yards, 1 TD

Top Receivers

- MISS – A. J. Brown: 9 receptions, 72 yards
- LSU – Justin Jefferson: 5 receptions, 99 yards, 2 TD

=== Louisiana-Monroe ===
Game Six – Louisiana-Monroe Warhawks (2-3) at Ole Miss Rebels (3-2)

Quarter	1	2	3	4	Total
Warhawks	0	7	7	7	21
Rebels	21	28	14	7	70

at Vaught-Hemingway Stadium • Oxford, MS

- Date: Saturday, October 6, 2018
- Game time: 3:00 p.m. CDT
- Game weather: Sunny • Temperature: 87 °F (31 °C)
- Game attendance: 52,875
- Referee: Steve Marlowe
- TV announcers (SEC Network):
  Dave Neal (play-by-play)
  D.J. Shockley (color)
  Dawn Davenport (sideline)

Game information

First Quarter

- (10:58) MISS – Scottie Phillips 2 yard rush, Luke Logan kick
  Ole Miss 7-0; 6 plays, 78 yards, 1:35
- (7:49) MISS - A. J. Brown 20 yard pass from Jordan Ta'amu, Luke Logan kick
  Ole Miss 14-0; 6 plays, 61 yards, 2:13
- (1:18) MISS - Jordan Ta'amu 1 yard rush, Luke Logan kick
  Ole Miss 21-0; 10 plays, 97 yards, 3:09

Second Quarter

- (12:13) MISS - Jordan Ta'amu 39 yard rush, Luke Logan kick
  Ole Miss 28-0; 5 plays, 66 yards, 2:00
- (9:35) ULM - Derrick Gore 11 yard rush, Craig Ford kick
  Ole Miss 28-7; 7 plays, 75 yards, 2:38
- (7:07) MISS - Scottie Phillips 1 yard rush, Luke Logan kick
  Ole Miss 35-7; 8 plays, 72 yards, 2:21
- (1:43) MISS - DK Metcalf 62 yard pass from Jordan Ta'amu, Luke Logan kick
  Ole Miss 42-7; 2 plays, 74 yards, 0:30
- (0:04) MISS - DaMarkus Lodge 16 yard pass from Jordan Ta'amu, Luke Logan kick
  Ole Miss 49-7; 6 plays, 98 yards, 1:03

Third Quarter

- (13:51) MISS - Scottie Phillips 11 yard pass from Matt Corral, Luke Logan kick
  Ole Miss 56-7; 4 plays, 75 yards, 1:09
- (10:04) MISS - Matt Corral 61 yard rush, Luke Logan kick
  Ole Miss 63-7; 2 plays, 92 yards, 0:29
- (4:59) ULM - Marcus Green 71 yard punt return, Craig Ford kick
  Ole Miss 63-14

Fourth Quarter

- (12:38) MISS - Elijah Moore 24 yard pass from Matt Corral, Luke Logan kick
  Ole Miss 70-14; 11 plays, 75 yards, 7:21
- (1:25) ULM - Zachari Jackson 8 yard pass from Colby Suits, Craig Ford kick
  Ole Miss 70-21; 12 plays, 86 yards, 4:07

Top Passers

- ULM – Caleb Evans: 17/28, 206 yards
- MISS – Jordan Ta'amu: 21/24, 374 yards, 3 TD

Top Rushers

- ULM – Derrick Gore: 10 carries, 52 yards, 1 TD
- MISS – Matt Corral: 6 carries, 78 yards, 1 TD

Top Receivers

- ULM – R. J. Turner: 5 receptions, 112 yards
- MISS – DaMarkus Lodge: 9 receptions, 179 yards, 1 TD

=== At Arkansas ===
Game Seven – Ole Miss Rebels (4–2) at Arkansas Razorbacks (1-5)

Quarter	1	2	3	4	Total
Rebels	3	14	7	13	37
Razorbacks	17	10	6	0	33

at War Memorial Stadium • Little Rock, Arkansas

- Date: October 13
- Game time: 6:30 p.m. CDT
- Game weather: Rain • Temperature: 55 °F (13 °C)
- Game attendance: 51,438
- Referee: Marc Curles
- TV announcers (SEC Network): Tom Hart (play-by-play), Jordan Rodgers (color), and Cole Cubelic (sideline)

Game information

First Quarter

- (12:49) MISS - Luke Logan 36 yard FG
  Ole Miss 3-0; 6 plays, 56 yards, 2:11
- (7:41) ARK - Connor Limpert 43 yard FG
  Tied 3-3; 11 plays, 50 yards, 5:08
- (3:24) ARK - Cheyenne O'Grady 39 yard pass from Ty Storey, Connor Limpert kick
  Arkansas 10-3; 7 plays, 78 yards, 3:01
- (0:31) ARK - Rakeem Boyd 69 yard rush, Connor Limpert kick
  Arkansas 17-3; 3 plays, 80 yards, 1:04

Second Quarter

- (12:23) MISS - Jordan Ta'amu 18 yard rush, Luke Logan kick
  Arkansas 17-10; 9 plays, 75 yards, 3:08
- (10:50) ARK - La'Michael Pettway 39 yard pass from Cole Kelley, Connor Limpert kick
  Arkansas 24-10; 5 plays, 75 yards, 1:33
- (2:36) ARK - Connor Limpert 38 yard FG
  Arkansas 27-10; 9 plays, 52 yards, 4:27
- (0:33) MISS - DaMarkus Lodge 6 yard pass from Jordan Ta'amu, Luke Logan kick
  Arkansas 27-17; 10 plays, 77 yards, 2:03

Third Quarter

- (9:28) ARK - Connor Limpert 38 yard FG
  Arkansas 30-17; 10 plays, 55 yards, 5:32
- (7:29) MISS - Octavious Cooley 66 yard pass from Jordan Ta'amu, Luke Logan kick
  Arkansas 30-24; 5 plays, 79 yards, 1:59
- (2:33) ARK - Connor Limpert 36 yard FG
  Arkansas 33-24; 11 plays, 57 yards, 4:56

Fourth Quarter

- (4:15) MISS - Isaiah Woullard 2 yard rush, Luke Logan kick
  Arkansas 33-31; 10 plays, 84 yards, 2:54
- (0:42) MISS - Scottie Phillips 5 yard rush, Two-Point Conversion Failed
  Ole Miss 37-33; 7 plays, 97 yards, 1:20

Top Passers

- MISS – Jordan Ta'amu: 26/35, 387 yards, 2 TD, 1 INT
- ARK – Ty Storey: 12/16, 122 yards, 1 TD

Top Rushers

- MISS – Jordan Ta'amu: 17 carries, 141 yards, 1 TD
- ARK – Rakeem Boyd: 7 carries, 109 yards, 1 TD

Top Receivers

- MISS – Octavious Cooley: 2 receptions, 85 yards, 1 TD
- ARK – La'Michael Pettway: 3 receptions, 77 yards, 1 TD

=== Auburn ===
Game Eight – Auburn Tigers (4-3) at Ole Miss Rebels (5-2)

Quarter	1	2	3	4	Total
Tigers	7	3	21	0	31
Rebels	3	3	3	7	16

at Vaught-Hemingway Stadium • Oxford, MS

- Date: Saturday, October 20, 2018
- Game time: 11:00 a.m. CDT
- Game weather: Partly Cloudy • Temperature: 59 °F (15 °C)
- Game attendance: 56,885
- Referee: David Smith
- TV announcers (ESPN):
  Adam Amin (play-by-play)
  Rod Gilmore (color)
  Quint Kessenich (sideline)

Game information

First Quarter

- (8:36) AUB - JaTarvious Whitlow 3 yard pass from Jarrett Stidham, Anders Carlson kick
  Auburn 7-0; 11 plays, 77 yards, 3:44
- (5:49) MISS - Luke Logan 36 yard FG
  Auburn 7-3; 11 plays, 56 yards, 2:47

Second Quarter

- (9:16) MISS - Luke Logan 37 yard FG
  Auburn 7-6; 8 plays, 51 yards, 2:22
- (4:18) AUB - Anders Carlson 28 yard FG
  Auburn 10-6; 15 plays, 86 yards, 4:58

Third Quarter

- (12:07) AUB - Malik Miller 1 yard rush, Anders Carlson kick
  Auburn 17-6; 7 plays, 68 yards, 2:53
- (8:30) MISS - Luke Logan 35 yard FG
  Auburn 17-9; 9 plays, 57 yards, 3:37
- (6:53) AUB - Anthony Schwartz 0 yard Fumble Return, Anders Carlson kick
  Auburn 24-9
- (3:00) AUB - Malik Miller 2 yard rush, Anders Carlson kick
  Auburn 31-9; 3 plays, 62 yards, 0:58

Fourth Quarter

- (2:24) MISS - A. J. Brown 12 yard pass from Jordan Ta'amu, Luke Logan kick
  Auburn 31-16; 15 plays, 82 yards, 5:03

Top Passers

- AUB – Jarrett Stidham: 13/22, 215 yards, 1 TD
- MISS – Jordan Ta'amu: 27/46, 324 yards, 1 TD

Top Rushers

- AUB – JaTarvious Whitlow: 19 carries, 170 yards
- MISS – Scottie Phillips: 17 carries, 59 yards

Top Receivers

- AUB – Seth Williams: 2 receptions, 83 yards
- MISS – A. J. Brown: 10 receptions, 155 yards, 1 TD

=== South Carolina ===
Game Nine – South Carolina Gamecocks (4-3) at Ole Miss Rebels (5-3)

Quarter	1	2	3	4	Total
Gamecocks	17	10	7	14	48
Rebels	3	24	10	7	44

at Vaught-Hemingway Stadium • Oxford, MS

- Date: Saturday, November 3, 2018
- Game time: 11:00 a.m. CDT
- Game weather: Sunny • Temperature: 66 °F (19 °C)
- Game attendance: 56,798
- Referee: Marc Curles
- TV announcers (SEC Network):
  Taylor Zarzour (play-by-play)
  Matt Stinchcomb (color)
  Kris Budden (sideline)

Game information

First Quarter

- (14:43) SC - Deebo Samuel 90 yard kickoff return, Parker White kick
  South Carolina 7-0
- (11:15) MISS - Luke Logan 25 yard FG
  South Carolina 7-3; 12 plays, 65 yards, 3:22
- (9:12) SC - Ty'Son Williams 2 yard run, Parker White kick
  South Carolina 14-3; 8 plays, 75 yards, 2:03
- (2:38) SC - Parker White 20 yard FG
  South Carolina 17-3; 9 plays, 73 yards, 3:25

Second Quarter

- (13:46) MISS - Scottie Phillips 9 yard run, Luke Logan kick
  South Carolina 17-10; 11 plays, 75 yards, 3:52
- (7:52) MISS - Luke Logan 26 yard FG
  South Carolina 17-13; 12 plays, 80 yards, 3:42
- (7:41) SC - Bryan Edwards 75 yard pass from Jake Bentley, Parker White kick
  South Carolina 24-13; 1 play, 75 yards, 0:11
- (6:22) MISS - Jordan Ta'amu 17 yard rush, Luke Logan kick
  South Carolina 24-20; 5 plays, 75 yards, 1:19
- (2:01) SC - Parker White 23 yard FG
  South Carolina 27-20; 11 plays, 72 yards, 4:14
- (0:10) MISS - Scottie Phillips 1 yard rush, Luke Logan kick
  Tied 27-27; 9 plays, 75 yards, 1:51

Third Quarter

- (11:56) MISS - Luke Logan 31 yard FG
  Ole Miss 30-27; 9 plays, 61 yards, 3:04
- (10:05) SC - Josh Vann 5 yard pass from Jake Bentley, Parker White kick
  South Carolina 34-30; 7 plays, 71 yards, 1:49
- (2:50) MISS - Scottie Phillips 2 yard rush, Luke Logan kick
  Ole Miss 37-34; 10 plays, 54 yards, 3:42

Fourth Quarter

- (14:15) MISS - Isaiah Woullard 1 yard rush, Luke Logan kick
  Ole Miss 44-34; 5 plays, 37 yards, 2:20
- (11:01) SC - A. J. Turner 3 yard rush, Parker White kick
  Ole Miss 44-41; 8 plays, 47 yards, 3:06
- (5:50) SC - Jake Bentley 4 yard rush, Parker White kick
  South Carolina 48-44; 4 plays, 73 yards, 1:14

Top Passers

- SC – Jake Bentley: 22/32, 363 yards, 2 TD
- MISS – Jordan Ta'amu: 31/46, 379 yards

Top Rushers

- SC – Mon Denson: 12 carries, 102 yards
- MISS – Scottie Phillips: 21 carries, 141 yards, 3 TD

Top Receivers

- SC – Bryan Edwards: 4 receptions, 109 yards, 1 TD
- MISS – Elijah Moore: 11 receptions, 129 yards

=== At Texas A&M ===
Game Ten – Ole Miss Rebels (5–4) at Texas A&M Aggies (5-4)

Quarter	1	2	3	4	Total
Rebels	0	14	7	3	24
Aggies	7	7	7	17	38

at Kyle Field • College Station, Texas

- Date: Saturday, November 10, 2018
- Game time: 11:00 a.m. CDT
- Game weather: Cloudy • Temperature: 49 °F (9 °C)
- Game attendance: 102,618
- Referee: Matt Austin
- TV announcers (CBS): Carter Blackburn (play-by-play), Aaron Taylor (color), Rick Neuheisel (color), and John Schriffen (sideline)

Game information

First Quarter

- (1:49) TA&M - Kellen Mond 1 yard rush, Seth Small kick
  Texas A&M 7-0; 14 plays, 71 yards, 7:00

Second Quarter

- (14:51) MISS - DaMarkus Lodge 44 yard pass from Jordan Ta'amu, Luke Logan kick
  Tied 7-7; 5 plays, 75 yards, 1:58
- (9:48) MISS - Jordan Ta'amu 1 yard rush, Luke Logan kick
  Ole Miss 14-7; 7 plays, 75 yards, 3:02
- (0:44) TA&M - Camron Buckley 21 yard pass from Kellen Mond, Seth Small kick
  Tied 14-14; 8 plays, 85 yards, 2:48

Third Quarter

- (11:34) MISS - Zedrick Woods 96 yard fumble return, Luke Logan kick
  Ole Miss 21-14
- (4:04) TA&M - Quartney Davis 10 yard pass from Kellen Mond, Seth Small kick
  Tied 21-21; 9 plays, 72 yards, 4:09

Fourth Quarter

- (14:11) TA&M - Seth Small 46 yard FG
  Texas A&M 24-21; 7 plays, 18 yards, 2:36
- (4:36) TA&M - Quartney Davis 5 yard pass from Kellen Mond, Seth Small kick
  Texas A&M 31-21; 6 plays, 80 yards, 2:42
- (1:51) MISS - Luke Logan 24 yard FG
  Texas A&M 31-24; 9 plays, 68 yards, 2:45
- (1:39) TA&M - Trayveon Williams 46 yard rush, Seth Small kick
  Texas A&M 38-24; 1 play, 46 yards, 0:12

Top Passers

- MISS – Jordan Ta'amu: 22/35, 373 yards, 1 TD
- TA&M – Kellen Mond: 19/28, 236 yards, 3 TD, 1 INT

Top Rushers

- MISS – Isaiah Woullard: 16 carries, 64 yards
- TA&M – Trayveon Williams: 31 carries, 228 yards, 1 TD

Top Receivers

- MISS – A. J. Brown: 6 receptions, 127 yards
- TA&M – Jace Sternberger: 4 receptions, 76 yards

=== At Vanderbilt ===
Game Eleven – Ole Miss Rebels (5–5) at Vanderbilt Commodores (4-6)

Quarter	1	2	3	4	OT	Total
Rebels	3	10	6	10	0	29
Commodores	0	12	14	3	7	36

at Vanderbilt Stadium • Nashville, Tennessee

- Date: Saturday, November 17, 2018
- Game time: 6:30 p.m. CDT (7:30 p.m. local EDT)
- Game weather: Clear • Temperature: 57 °F (14 °C)
- Game attendance: 24,866
- Referee: David Smith
- TV announcers (SEC Network): Tom Hart (play-by-play), Jordan Rodgers (color), and Cole Cubelic (sideline)

Game information

First Quarter

- (5:22) MISS - Luke Logan 32 yard FG
  Ole Miss 3-0; 13 plays, 74 yards, 4:28

Second Quarter

- (12:02) MISS - Luke Logan 20 yard FG
  Ole Miss 6-0; 13 plays, 91 yards, 5:32
- (9:41) MISS - A. J. Brown 84 yard pass from Jordan Ta'amu, Luke Logan kick
  Ole Miss 13-0; 1 play, 84 yards, 0:13
- (5:44) VAN - Ryley Guay 37 yard FG
  Ole Miss 13-3; 3 plays, 4 yards, 1:48
- (3:56) VAN - Mac Brown punt blocked for a safety
  Ole Miss 13-5
- (1:02) VAN - Kalija Lipscomb 2 yard pass from Kyle Shurmur, Ryley Guay kick
  Ole Miss 13-12; 7 plays, 53 yards, 2:54

Third Quarter

- (11:33) VAN - Ke'Shawn Vaughn 1 yard rush, Ryley Guay kick
  Vanderbilt 19-13; 7 plays, 64 yards, 3:27
- (9:00) MISS - Luke Logan 22 yard FG
  Vanderbilt 19-16; 7 plays, 70 yards, 2:33
- (6:26) MISS - Luke Logan 35 yard FG
  Tied 19-19; 4 plays, 8 yards, 1:30
- (0:49) VAN - C. J. Bolar 3 yard pass from Kyle Shurmur, Ryley Guay kick
  Vanderbilt 26-19; 12 plays, 75 yards, 5:37

Fourth Quarter

- (9:43) MISS - DaMarkus Lodge 9 yard pass from Jordan Ta'amu, Luke Logan kick
  Tied 26-26; 6 plays, 90 yards, 1:59
- (5:20) VAN - Ryley Guay 44 yard FG
  Vanderbilt 29-26; 8 plays, 49 yards, 4:23
- (0:40) MISS - Luke Logan 32 yard FG
  Tied 29-29; 11 plays, 46 yards, 1:01

Overtime

- VAN - Kalija Lipscomb 5 yard pass from Kyle Shurmur, Ryley Guay kick
  Vanderbilt 36-29; 3 plays, 25 yards

Top Passers

- MISS – Jordan Ta'amu: 32/52, 457 yards, 2 TD, 2 INT
- VAN – Kyle Shurmur: 22/34, 191 yards, 3 TD, 1 INT

Top Rushers

- MISS – Isaiah Woullard: 16 carries, 107 yards
- VAN – Ke'Shawn Vaughn: 25 carries, 127 yards, 1 TD

Top Receivers

- MISS – A. J. Brown: 9 receptions, 212 yards, 1 TD
- VAN – Jared Pinkney: 6 receptions, 85 yards

=== No. 18 Mississippi State ===
No. 18 Mississippi State Bulldogs (7–4) at Ole Miss Rebels (5–6)

Quarter	1	2	3	4	Total
No. 18 Bulldogs	7	14	7	7	35
Rebels	0	3	0	0	3

at Vaught-Hemingway Stadium • Oxford, Mississippi

- Date: November 22
- Game time: 6:30 p.m. CDT
- Game weather: Clear • Temperature: 46 °F (8 °C)
- Game attendance: 56,561
- Referee: James Carter
- TV announcers (ESPN): Dave Flemming (play-by-play), Greg McElroy (color), and Laura Rutledge (sideline)

Game information

First Quarter

- (5:02) MSST - Kylin Hill 6 yard rush, Jace Christmann kick
  Mississippi State 7-0; 7 plays, 30 yards, 3:02

Second Quarter

- (14:04) MSST - Nick Fitzgerald 8 yard rush, Jace Christmann kick
  Mississippi State 14-0; 8 plays, 86 yards, 3:30
- (6:46) MISS - Luke Logan 32 yard FG
  Mississippi State 14-3; 10 plays, 51 yards, 3:54
- (0:25) MSST - Deddrick Thomas 9 yard pass from Nick Fitzgerald, Jace Christmann kick
  Mississippi State 21-3; 8 plays, 92 yards, 3:03

Third Quarter

- (10:42) MSST - Nick Fitzgerald 9 yard rush, Jace Christmann kick
  Mississippi State 28-3; 3 plays, 19 yards, 1:40

Fourth Quarter

- (7:21) MSST - Aeris Williams 1 yard rush, Jace Christmann kick
  Mississippi State 35-3; 11 plays, 89 yards, 5:46

Top Passers

- MSST – Nick Fitzgerald: 11/18, 111 yards, 1 TD
- MISS – Jordan Ta'amu: 8/17, 87 yards, 1 INT

Top Rushers

- MSST – Nick Fitzgerald: 18 carries, 117 yards, 2 TD
- MISS – Isaiah Woullard: 11 carries, 63 yards

Top Receivers

- MSST – Jesse Jackson: 2 receptions, 31 yards
- MISS – A. J. Brown: 4 receptions, 61 yards

== Players drafted into the NFL ==
Ole Miss had six players selected in the 2019 NFL draft.

Round	Pick	Player	Position	NFL club
2	37	Greg Little	OT	Carolina Panthers
2	51	A. J. Brown	WR	Tennessee Titans
2	64	DK Metcalf	WR	Seattle Seahawks
3	96	Dawson Knox	TE	Buffalo Bills
7	246	Javon Patterson	C	Indianapolis Colts
7	252	Ken Webster	CB	New England Patriots

== See also ==
- 2017–18 Ole Miss Rebels men's basketball team
- 2017–18 Ole Miss Rebels women's basketball team
- 2018 Ole Miss Rebels baseball team
