= Scottie Phillips =

American football player (born 1997)

No. 40, 27, 22
- Position: Running back

Personal information
- Born: October 6, 1997 (age 29); Ellisville, Mississippi, U.S.
- Listed height: 5 ft 8 in (1.73 m)
- Listed weight: 209 lb (95 kg)

Career information
- High school: South Jones
- College: Ole Miss (2018–2019)
- NFL draft: 2020: undrafted

Career history
- Houston Texans (2020–2021); Seattle Sea Dragons (2023)

Career NFL statistics
- Rushing yards: 22
- Rushing average: 2.8
- Receptions: 3
- Receiving yards: 16
- Stats at Pro Football Reference

Scottie Phillips (born October 6, 1997) is an American former professional football player who was a running back for the Houston Texans of the National Football League (NFL). He played college football for the Ole Miss Rebels.

== Early life ==
Attending South Jones, Phillips ran for over 1600 yards and 22 touchdowns in his senior year, averaging 163 yards per game. As a junior, Phillips ran for 571 yards and 4 touchdowns, averaging 81.6 yards per game. Phillips was named a 2015 MAC all-state first-team selection.

== College career ==
=== Jones College ===
Phillips was ranked as a 3-4 star Junior College prospect. As a freshman, Phillips ran for 1,212 yards and 14 touchdowns, averaging 123.6 yards per game; Earning an honorable mention in the NCJAA All-America honors. In his sophomore year, Phillips would run for 1,070 yards alongside 13 touchdowns, propelling him to the team leading scorer.

=== University of Mississippi (Ole Miss) ===
==== 2018 ====
For his Junior Year, Scottie Phillips would enroll with the Division I Ole Miss Rebels. In 2018, Phillips would start in 10 games, playing in one additional game. Phillips would rack up 14 all-purpose touchdowns, 12 of which were rushing, ranking for fifth and third in the SEC respectively. Phillips also ran for 927 yards, which was ninth in the SEC. In his first game at Ole Miss, in Week 1 against Texas Tech Phillips recorded 204 yards and 2 touchdowns, becoming the eighth Ole Miss running back to surpass 200-yards in a single game, winning SEC Offensive Player of the Week for his efforts. As of 2019, he holds the Ole Miss school record for most yards by a running back in their debut. During Week 10 against Texas A&M, Phillips would rush only 3 times for 4 yards before getting injured on the sixth play of the game. After missing Week 11, Phillips would serve in the backup role in Week 12 against Mississippi State to finish out the season.

==== 2019 ====
Entering his 2019 campaign with the Rebels, Phillips was considered to be the lead running back on the team, starting over five-star prospect Jerrion Ealy. Phillips had considerable expectations for his 2019 season.

=== College statistics ===
Year	Team	Class	Position	GP	Rushing				Receiving				Scrimmage			
Year	Team	Class	Position	GP	Att	Yards	Avg	TD	Rec	Yards	Avg	TD	Plays	Yards	Avg	TD
2018	Ole Miss	Junior	RB	11	153	928	6.1	12	10	105	10.5	2	163	1033	6.3	14
2019	Ole Miss	Senior	RB	9	125	542	4.3	5	8	77	9.6	1	133	619	4.7	6

== Professional career ==
Pre-draft measurables
Height	Weight	Arm length	Hand span	Wingspan	40-yard dash	10-yard split	20-yard split	20-yard shuttle	Three-cone drill	Vertical jump	Broad jump	Bench press
5 ft 8 in (1.73 m)	209 lb (95 kg)	29 3/8 in (0.75 m)	8 1/2 in (0.22 m)	5 ft 10 1/4 in (1.78 m)	4.56 s	1.55 s	2.68 s	4.53 s	7.40 s	30.0 in (0.76 m)	9 ft 6 in (2.90 m)	29 reps
All values are from NFL Scouting Combine

=== Houston Texans ===
Phillips signed with the Houston Texans as an undrafted free agent on April 27, 2020. He was waived on September 5, 2020 and signed to the practice squad the next day. Phillips was elevated to the active roster on September 10 and November 21 for the team's weeks 1 and 11 games against the Kansas City Chiefs and New England Patriots, and reverted to the practice squad after each game. He was promoted to the active roster on November 25, 2020.

On November 9, 2021, Phillips was placed on injured reserve. He was waived/injured on May 2, 2022 and placed on injured reserve. On June 16, 2022, Phillips was released by the Texans with an injury settlement.

=== Seattle Sea Dragons ===
On November 17, 2022, Phillips was drafted by the Seattle Sea Dragons of the XFL. He was removed from the roster in August 2023.
