= Javon Patterson =

American football player (born 1997)

No. 63
- Position: Center

Personal information
- Born: July 8, 1997 (age 29); Petal, Mississippi, U.S.
- Listed height: 6 ft 3 in (1.91 m)
- Listed weight: 305 lb (138 kg)

Career information
- High school: Petal
- College: Ole Miss
- NFL draft: 2019: 7th round, 246th overall pick

Career history
- Indianapolis Colts (2019); New York Giants (2020)*; Cleveland Browns (2020); Denver Broncos (2021)*
- * Offseason or practice squad member only

Career NFL statistics
- Games played: 1
- Stats at Pro Football Reference

Javon Patterson (born July 8, 1997) is an American former professional football player who was a center in the National Football League (NFL). He played college football for the Ole Miss Rebels. He is currently working at Ole Miss Athletics as the Assistant A.D. for Strategy and Cap Management.

== Professional career ==
=== Indianapolis Colts ===
Patterson was selected by the Indianapolis Colts in the seventh round, 246th overall, of the 2019 NFL draft.

On June 4, 2019, Colts head coach Frank Reich announced that Patterson had torn his anterior cruciate ligament. Patterson missed the entire 2019 season as a result of the injury.

Patterson was waived by the Colts on September 5, 2020, as part of their roster cuts.

=== New York Giants ===
On September 23, 2020, Patterson was signed to the practice squad of the New York Giants. He was released on October 27.

=== Cleveland Browns ===
On November 10, 2020, Patterson was signed to the Cleveland Browns' practice squad. He was elevated to the active roster on December 26 for the team's week 16 game against the New York Jets, and reverted to the practice squad after the game. He was placed on the practice squad/COVID-19 list by the team on December 30, 2020, and restored to the practice squad on January 8, 2021.

Patterson signed a reserve/futures contract with the Browns after the season on January 18, 2021. Patterson was waived by the Browns on August 31, 2021.

=== Denver Broncos ===
On September 29, 2021, Patterson was signed to the Denver Broncos practice squad. He was released on October 26. He was re-signed on December 24, but retired three days later.
