= 2018 Baylor Bears football team =

American college football season

2018 Baylor Bears football

Texas Bowl champion

Texas Bowl, W 45–38 vs. Vanderbilt
- Conference: Big 12 Conference
- Record: 7–6 (4–5 Big 12)
- Head coach: Matt Rhule (2nd season)
- Co-offensive coordinators: Glenn Thomas (2nd season); Jeff Nixon (2nd season)
- Offensive scheme: Spread
- Defensive coordinator: Phil Snow (2nd season)
- Base defense: 3–3 stack
- Home stadium: McLane Stadium

2018 Big 12 Conference football standings
	Conf.			Overall
Team	W		L	W		L
No. 4 Oklahoma y$^	8	–	1	12	–	2
No. 9 Texas y	7	–	2	10	–	4
Iowa State	6	–	3	8	–	5
No. 20 West Virginia	6	–	3	8	–	4
TCU	4	–	5	7	–	6
Baylor	4	–	5	7	–	6
Oklahoma State	3	–	6	7	–	6
Kansas State	3	–	6	5	–	7
Texas Tech	3	–	6	5	–	7
Kansas	1	–	8	3	–	9
Championship: Oklahoma 39, Texas 27
^ – College Football Playoff participant; $ – Conference champion; y – Championship game participant; Rankings from AP Poll

The 2018 Baylor Bears football team represented Baylor University in the 2018 NCAA Division I FBS football season. The Bears played their home games at the McLane Stadium in Waco, Texas. They competed as a member of the Big 12 Conference and were led by second-year head coach Matt Rhule. The team improved on its 1–11 record from last season, as they would finish 7–6, 4–5 in Big 12 play to finish in a tie for fifth place. They were invited to the Texas Bowl, where they defeated Vanderbilt.

The Baylor Bears football team drew an average home attendance of 41,336, down from 43,830 in 2017.

== Preseason ==
=== Award watch lists ===
Listed in the order that they were released

Award	Player	Position	Year
Rimington Trophy	Sam Tecklenburg	C	JR
Fred Biletnikoff Award	Denzel Mims	WR	JR
Bronko Nagurski Trophy	Ira Lewis	DT	SR
Outland Trophy	Ira Lewis	DT	SR
Lou Groza Award	Connor Martin	K	JR
Earl Campbell Tyler Rose Award	Denzel Mims	WR	JR

=== Big 12 media poll ===
The Big 12 media poll was released July 12, 2018, with the Bears predicted to finish in ninth place.

Media poll
Predicted finish	Team	Votes (1st place)
1	Oklahoma	509 (46)
2	West Virginia	432 (2)
3	TCU	390 (1)
4	Texas	370 (1)
5	Oklahoma State	300
6	Kansas State	283 (2)
7	Iowa State	250
8	Texas Tech	149
9	Baylor	125
10	Kansas	52

== Schedule ==
Baylor announced its football schedule Oct. 26, 2017. The Bears played 12 games with six home games (two non-conference games and four Big 12 games), five away games (one non-conference game and four Big 12 games) and a neutral-site Big 12 game.

Date	Time	Opponent	Site	TV	Result	Attendance
September 1	7:00 p.m.	Abilene Christian*	McLane Stadium; Waco, TX	FSN	W 55–27	45,330
September 8	6:00 p.m.	at UTSA*	Alamodome; San Antonio, TX	Facebook	W 37–20	42,071
September 15	2:30 p.m.	Duke*	McLane Stadium; Waco, TX	FS1	L 27–40	40,442
September 22	2:30 p.m.	Kansas	McLane Stadium; Waco, TX	FS1	W 26–7	36,725
September 29	2:30 p.m.	at No. 6 Oklahoma	Gaylord Family Oklahoma Memorial Stadium; Norman, OK	ABC	L 33–66	86,642
October 6	2:30 p.m.	Kansas State	McLane Stadium; Waco, TX	FS1	W 37–34	36,888
October 13	2:30 p.m.	at No. 9 Texas	Darrell K Royal–Texas Memorial Stadium; Austin, TX (rivalry)	ESPN	L 17–23	93,882
October 25	6:00 p.m.	at No. 13 West Virginia	Mountaineer Field; Morgantown, WV	FS1	L 14–58	53,117
November 3	11:00 a.m.	Oklahoma State^{†}	McLane Stadium; Waco, TX	FS1	W 35–31	43,492
November 10	2:30 p.m.	at No. 23 Iowa State	Jack Trice Stadium; Ames, IA	FS1	L 14–28	53,860
November 17	11:00 a.m.	TCU	McLane Stadium; Waco, TX (rivalry)	FS1	L 9–16	45,140
November 24	11:00 a.m.	vs. Texas Tech	AT&T Stadium; Arlington, TX (rivalry)	FS1	W 35–24	27,308
December 27	8:00 p.m.	vs. Vanderbilt*	NRG Stadium; Houston, TX (Texas Bowl)	ESPN	W 45–38	51,104
*Non-conference game; ^{†}Homecoming; Rankings from AP Poll released prior to the game; All times are in Central time

Schedule source:

== Game summaries ==
=== Abilene Christian ===
	1	2	3	4	Total
Wildcats	7	13	7	0	27
Bears	17	21	10	7	55

=== At UTSA ===
	1	2	3	4	Total
Bears	10	10	7	10	37
Roadrunners	3	10	0	7	20

=== Duke ===
	1	2	3	4	Total
Blue Devils	7	16	7	10	40
Bears	0	0	13	14	27

=== Kansas ===
	1	2	3	4	Total
Jayhawks	0	0	7	0	7
Bears	7	16	3	0	26

=== At Oklahoma ===
	1	2	3	4	Total
Bears	6	3	14	10	33
No. 6 Sooners	14	14	21	17	66

=== Kansas State ===
	1	2	3	4	Total
Wildcats	7	7	0	20	34
Bears	3	9	8	17	37

Baylor held a slight edge in the pregame analysis. Coming into the game Baylor was considered better than they were at this same time last year and has won 3 games (Kansas, Texas-San Antonio, and Abilene Christian), the Bears have also lost 2 (Duke, Oklahoma). In Baylor's previous game against Oklahoma, they achieved 493 yards of offense in their loss—something expected to be a challenge for Kansas State on defense.

The game started with Kansas State holding the lead at the end of the first and second quarters. Baylor pulled ahead in the third quarter but missed several field goals. Baylor's Charlie Brewer threw for 296 yards and Kansas State's Alex Barnes rushed for 250 yards (he ran for 129 yards and four touchdowns in the 2016 matchup also at Baylor).

Kansas State had its share of mistakes: K-State missed a field goal and an extra point and were also ineffective on kickoff returns. Kansas State also gave up a fumble on the kickoff return after a controversial play review to start the third quarter and Baylor scored a touchdown two plays later. Wildcat turnovers and penalties led to three touchdowns for Baylor. They also had problems with a punt return they recovered and an extra point was blocked.

Baylor's Connor Martin had a rough day as the kicker, missing three field goals and an extra point, yet among all that he ended up kicking the game-winning field goal from 29 yards with 8 seconds left in the game. The final score was a Baylor victory, 37-34.

=== At Texas ===
	1	2	3	4	Total
Bears	7	3	7	0	17
No. 9 Longhorns	3	20	0	0	23

=== At West Virginia ===
	1	2	3	4	Total
Bears	0	0	14	0	14
No. 13 Mountaineers	10	31	10	7	58

=== Oklahoma State ===
	1	2	3	4	Total
Cowboys	7	3	14	7	31
Bears	0	14	7	14	35

=== At Iowa State ===
	1	2	3	4	Total
Bears	0	0	7	7	14
No. 23 Cyclones	7	10	11	0	28

=== TCU ===
	1	2	3	4	Total
Horned Frogs	3	6	7	0	16
Bears	6	0	3	0	9

=== vs Texas Tech ===
	1	2	3	4	Total
Bears	7	7	14	7	35
Red Raiders	10	7	0	7	24

=== vs Vanderbilt–Texas Bowl ===
	1	2	3	4	Total
Bears	10	7	14	14	45
Commodores	14	7	7	10	38

== Players drafted into the NFL ==
Round	Pick	Player	Position	NFL Club
3	67	Jalen Hurd	WR	San Francisco 49ers
