= Jared Pinkney =

American football player (born 1997)

Profile
- Position: Tight end

Personal information
- Born: August 21, 1997 (age 29); Atlanta, Georgia, U.S.
- Listed height: 6 ft 4 in (1.93 m)
- Listed weight: 257 lb (117 kg)

Career information
- High school: Norcross (Norcross, Georgia)
- College: Vanderbilt (2015–2019)
- NFL draft: 2020: undrafted

Career history
- Atlanta Falcons (2020); Tennessee Titans (2021)*; Detroit Lions (2021)*; Los Angeles Rams (2021)*; Detroit Lions (2021); Los Angeles Rams (2022); Chicago Bears (2023)*
- * Offseason or practice squad member only

Awards and highlights
- Second-team All-SEC (2018)

Career NFL statistics
- Total tackles: 1
- Stats at Pro Football Reference

Jared Pinkney (born August 21, 1997) is an American former professional football player who was a tight end in the National Football League (NFL). He played college football for the Vanderbilt Commodores and was signed as an undrafted free agent by the Atlanta Falcons in 2020. He played for the Tennessee Titans and Los Angeles Rams

== Early life ==
Pinkney grew up in Norcross, Georgia, and attended Norcross High School. As a senior, he caught 32 passes for 480 yards and three touchdowns and was named first-team All-region and honorable mention All-State. Rated a consensus three-star recruit, Pinkney committed to play college football for the Vanderbilt Commodores over offers from Nebraska, Miami, Florida, and Missouri.

== College career ==
Pinkney used a medical redshirt as a true freshman after suffering an injury in the season opener. He was named to Athlon Sports' Southeastern Conference (SEC) All-Freshman team after catching 22 passes for 274 receiving yards and two touchdowns and posted 22 receptions, 273 receiving yards and three touchdowns as a redshirt sophomore. He entered his redshirt junior season on the watchlist for the John Mackey Award. Pinkney finished the season with 50 receptions for 774 yards and seven touchdowns and was named second-team All-SEC by the Associated Press.

Pinkney was again named to the Mackey Award watchlist and was named second-team preseason All-SEC going into his redshirt senior season. He was also listed as the top tight end prospect for the 2020 NFL Draft by Todd McShay and Mel Kiper of ESPN and as a projected first round pick by Pro Football Focus. Pinkney experienced a down year as a senior, finishing the season with 20 receptions for 233 yards and two touchdowns in 11 games, missing the final game of the season due to injury.

== Professional career ==
Pre-draft measurables
Height	Weight	Arm length	Hand span	40-yard dash	10-yard split	20-yard split	Bench press
6 ft 4 in (1.93 m)	257 lb (117 kg)	32 7/8 in (0.84 m)	10 1/2 in (0.27 m)	4.96 s	1.71 s	2.88 s	23 reps
All values from NFL Combine

=== Atlanta Falcons ===
Pinkney signed with the Atlanta Falcons as an undrafted free agent on April 27, 2020, shortly after the conclusion of the 2020 NFL draft. He was waived on September 5, 2020, and signed to the practice squad the next day. He was elevated to the active roster on January 2, 2021, for the team's week 17 game against the Tampa Bay Buccaneers, and reverted to the practice squad after being declared inactive for the game. His practice squad contract with the team expired after the season on January 11, 2021.

=== Tennessee Titans ===
On January 13, 2021, Pinkney signed a reserve/futures contract with the Tennessee Titans. He was waived on August 31, 2021.

=== Detroit Lions (first stint) ===
On September 2, 2021, Pinkney was signed to the Detroit Lions practice squad. He was released on October 12.

=== Los Angeles Rams (first stint) ===
On October 20, 2021, Pinkney was signed to the Los Angeles Rams practice squad.

=== Detroit Lions (second stint) ===
On December 28, 2021, Pinkney was signed by the Lions off the Rams practice squad. Pinkney made his NFL debut on January 2, 2022, starting at tight end for the Lions in a 51–29 loss to the Seattle Seahawks. He was waived on May 10, 2022.

=== Los Angeles Rams (second stint) ===
On June 15, 2022, Pinkney signed with the Rams. He was waived on August 30, 2022, and signed to the practice squad the next day. He was promoted to the active roster on January 7, 2023.

On March 10, 2023, Pinkney was waived by the Los Angeles Rams.

=== Chicago Bears ===
On July 31, 2023, Pinkney signed with the Chicago Bears. He was waived/injured on August 21, 2023, and reverted to injured reserve the next day after going unclaimed on waivers.
