= Khari Blasingame =

American football player (born 1996)

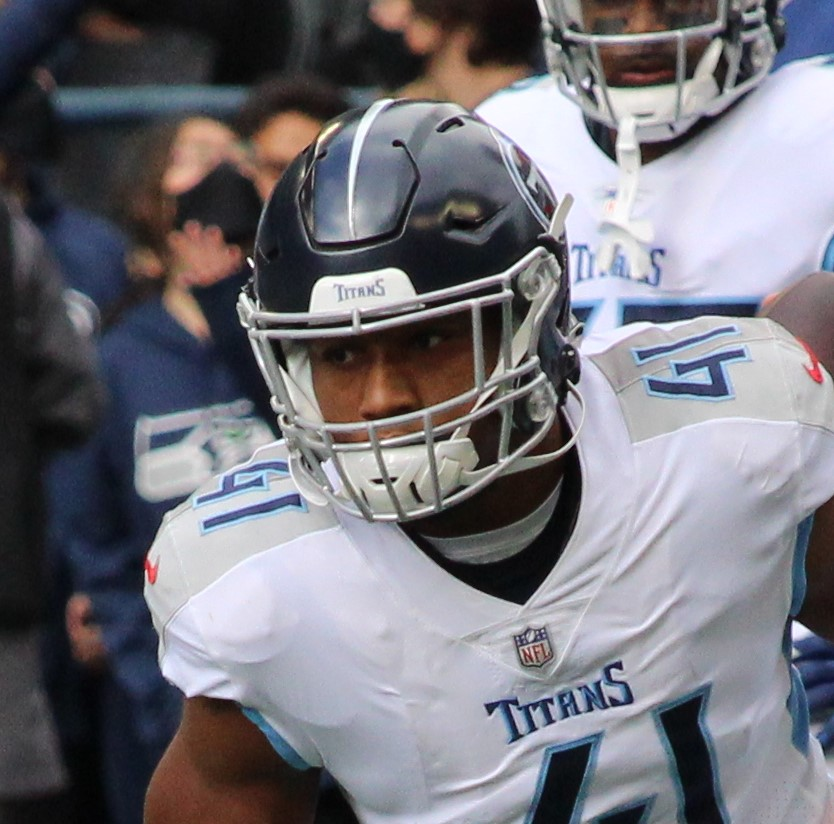
- Blasingame with the Tennessee Titans in 2021

Profile
- Position: Fullback

Personal information
- Born: July 1, 1996 (age 30); Huntsville, Alabama, U.S.
- Listed height: 6 ft 0 in (1.83 m)
- Listed weight: 233 lb (106 kg)

Career information
- High school: Buckhorn (New Market, Alabama)
- College: Vanderbilt (2015–2018)
- NFL draft: 2019: undrafted

Career history
- Minnesota Vikings (2019); Tennessee Titans (2019–2021); Chicago Bears (2022–2024); Philadelphia Eagles (2024)

Awards and highlights
- Super Bowl champion (LIX)

Career NFL statistics as of 2024
- Rushing yards: 32
- Rushing average: 2.9
- Receptions: 13
- Receiving yards: 99
- Tackles: 13
- Stats at Pro Football Reference

Khari Thomas Blasingame (born July 1, 1996) is an American professional football fullback. He played college football for the Vanderbilt Commodores and was signed as an undrafted free agent by the Minnesota Vikings in 2019.

== Early life ==
Blasingame was a two-year captain and two-way starter at safety and running back for Buckhorn High School in New Market, Alabama. In his senior year, Blasingame posted 64 tackles, two interceptions, 966 rushing yards, and 10 touchdowns. As a three-star safety, Blasingame committed to Vanderbilt. He also received offers from Minnesota and Northwestern.

== College career ==
Blasingame signed with Vanderbilt as a linebacker in 2015. He started seven games in his freshman year, recording 12 total tackles. When he switched positions to halfback, the position he had played in high school, he experienced more success. Blasingame started 13 games, carrying the ball 97 times for 446 yards and 10 touchdowns. Starting 10 games as a junior, he rushed 45 times for 147 yards and no touchdowns. He also accumulated six receptions for 52 yards and a touchdown. Blasingame became a full-time starter during his senior season, taking 96 carries for 400 yards and five touchdowns, as well as racking up 25 catches for 320 yards and another touchdown.

In 2019, Blasingame was named the Arthur Ashe Jr. Male Sports Scholar by Diverse: Issues In Higher Education.

== Professional career ==
Pre-draft measurables
Height	Weight	Arm length	Hand span	Wingspan	40-yard dash	10-yard split	20-yard split	20-yard shuttle	Three-cone drill	Vertical jump	Broad jump	Bench press
6 ft 0 1/8 in (1.83 m)	233 lb (106 kg)	32 1/2 in (0.83 m)	9 1/2 in (0.24 m)	6 ft 7 3/4 in (2.03 m)	4.55 s	1.52 s	2.61 s	4.18 s	6.94 s	38.5 in (0.98 m)	10 ft 11 in (3.33 m)	20 reps
All values from Pro Day

=== Minnesota Vikings ===
After going undrafted, the Minnesota Vikings signed Blasingame as an undrafted free agent on May 3, 2019. He was waived on August 31, 2019, and was signed to the practice squad the next day.

=== Tennessee Titans ===
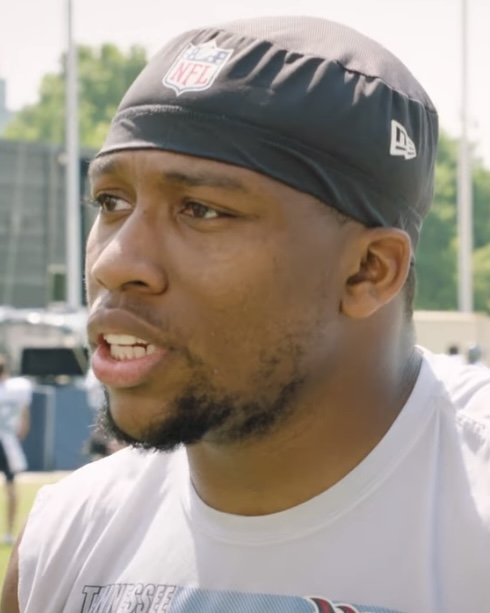
Blasingame in 2021

On November 13, 2019, the Tennessee Titans signed Blasingame to their active roster off the Vikings practice squad. In Week 14, Blasingame caught two passes for 47 yards against the Oakland Raiders.

Blasingame was placed on the reserve/COVID-19 list by the team on October 4, 2020, and was activated from the list on October 16.

Blasingame signed a one-year contract extension with the Titans on March 5, 2021. He was placed on injured reserve on November 6, 2021. He was activated on November 27.

=== Chicago Bears ===
On March 22, 2022, Blasingame signed a one-year contract with the Chicago Bears.

He signed a two-year contract extension on March 8, 2023. Blasingame became the Bears' emergency running back during the team's week 5 matchup against the Washington Commanders following injuries to the team's three running backs. He carried the ball eight times for 26 yards. Blasingame only had three rushing attempts in his entire career prior to the game.

On October 25, 2024, Blasingame was released by the Bears after they began using center Doug Kramer Jr. as their fullback.

=== Philadelphia Eagles ===
On December 3, 2024, Blasingame signed with the Philadelphia Eagles practice squad. Blasingame was signed to replace Eagles fullback Ben VanSumeren after the latter suffered a knee injury. Blasingame would play in 3 games for the Eagles during the 2024 regular season.

In the 2024 regular season, Blasingame played in 5 total games and played 12 offensive snaps and 75 special teams snaps. He recorded one special teams tackle with the Bears.

Blasingame was also elevated from the practice squad and played in all of the Eagles' postseason games. He won a Super Bowl championship when the Eagles defeated the Kansas City Chiefs 40–22 in Super Bowl LIX.
