= 2018 Missouri Tigers football team =

American college football season

2018 Missouri Tigers football

Liberty Bowl, L 33–38 vs. Oklahoma State
- Conference: Southeastern Conference
- Eastern Division
- Record: 8–5 (4–4 SEC)
- Head coach: Barry Odom (3rd season)
- Offensive coordinator: Derek Dooley (1st season)
- Offensive scheme: Spread
- Defensive coordinator: Ryan Walters (3rd season)
- Base defense: 4–3
- Home stadium: Faurot Field

2018 Southeastern Conference football standings
	Conf.			Overall
Team	W		L	W		L
Eastern Division
No. T–7 Georgia x	7	–	1	11	–	3
No. 12 Kentucky	5	–	3	10	–	3
No. T–7 Florida	5	–	3	10	–	3
South Carolina	4	–	4	7	–	6
Missouri	4	–	4	8	–	5
Vanderbilt	3	–	5	6	–	7
Tennessee	2	–	6	5	–	7
Western Division
No. 2 Alabama x$^	8	–	0	14	–	1
No. 16 Texas A&M	5	–	3	9	–	4
No. 6 LSU	5	–	3	10	–	3
Mississippi State*	4	–	4	8	–	5
Auburn	3	–	5	8	–	5
Ole Miss	1	–	7	5	–	7
Arkansas	0	–	8	2	–	10
Championship: Alabama 35, Georgia 28
^ – College Football Playoff participant; $ – Conference champion; x – Division champion/co-champions; * Mississippi State vacated four conference and eight total wins due to NCAA violations.; Rankings from AP Poll

The 2018 Missouri Tigers football team represented the University of Missouri in the 2018 NCAA Division I FBS football season. The Tigers played their home games at Faurot Field as members of the Eastern Division of the Southeastern Conference. They were led by third-year head coach Barry Odom.

== Preseason ==
=== Award watch lists ===
Listed in the order that they were released

Award	Player	Position	Year
Chuck Bednarik Award	Terry Beckner	DT	SR
Davey O'Brien Award	Drew Lock	QB	SR
Doak Walker Award	Damarea Crockett	RB	JR
Fred Biletnikoff Award	Emanuel Hall	WR	SR
John Mackey Award	Albert Okwuegbunam	TE	SO
Butkus Award	Terez Hall	LB	SO
Bronko Nagurski Trophy	Terry Beckner	DT	SR
Bronko Nagurski Trophy	Terez Hall	LB	SO
Outland Trophy	Paul Adams	OL	SR
Outland Trophy	Terry Beckner	DT	SR
Lou Groza Award	Tucker McCann	K	JR
Ray Guy Award	Corey Fatony	P	SR
Wuerffel Trophy	Corey Fatony	P	SR
Walter Camp Award	Drew Lock	QB	SR
Johnny Unitas Golden Arm Award	Drew Lock	QB	SR
Manning Award	Drew Lock	QB	SR

=== SEC media poll ===
The SEC media poll was released on July 20, 2018, with the Tigers predicted to finish in fourth place in the East Division.

=== Preseason All-SEC teams ===
The Tigers had five players selected to the preseason all-SEC teams.

Offense

1st team

Drew Lock – QB

Albert Okwuegbunam – TE

3rd team

Emanuel Hall – WR

Defense

2nd team

Terry Beckner – DL

Specialists

1st team

Corey Fatony – P

== Schedule ==
Date	Time	Opponent	Rank	Site	TV	Result	Attendance
September 1	3:00 p.m.	UT Martin*		Faurot Field; Columbia, MO	SECN	W 51–14	44,019
September 8	6:00 p.m.	Wyoming*		Faurot Field; Columbia, MO	ESPNU	W 40–13	50,820
September 15	6:30 p.m.	at Purdue*		Ross-Ade Stadium; West Lafayette, IN	BTN	W 40–37	48,103
September 22	11:00 a.m.	No. 2 Georgia		Faurot Field; Columbia, MO	ESPN	L 29–43	58,284
October 6	11:00 a.m.	at South Carolina		Williams–Brice Stadium; Columbia, SC (Mayor's Cup)	SECN	L 35–37	73,393
October 13	6:00 p.m.	at No. 1 Alabama		Bryant–Denny Stadium; Tuscaloosa, AL	ESPN	L 10–39	101,821
October 20	3:00 p.m.	Memphis*^{†}		Faurot Field; Columbia, MO	SECN	W 65–33	52,917
October 27	3:00 p.m.	No. 12 Kentucky		Faurot Field; Columbia, MO	SECN	L 14–15	53,397
November 3	3:00 p.m.	at No. 11 Florida		Ben Hill Griffin Stadium; Gainesville, FL	SECN	W 38–17	80,017
November 10	11:00 a.m.	Vanderbilt		Faurot Field; Columbia, MO	SECN	W 33–28	48,342
November 17	2:30 p.m.	at Tennessee		Neyland Stadium; Knoxville, TN	CBS	W 50–17	88,224
November 23	1:30 p.m.	Arkansas		Faurot Field; Columbia, MO (Battle Line Rivalry)	CBS	W 38–0	52,482
December 31	2:45 p.m.	vs. Oklahoma State*	No. 23	Liberty Bowl Memorial Stadium; Memphis, TN (Liberty Bowl)	ESPN	L 33–38	51,587
*Non-conference game; ^{†}Homecoming; Rankings from AP Poll and CFP Rankings after October 30 released prior to game; All times are in Central time

== Roster ==
2018 Missouri Tigers football team roster
Players
Coaches
Offense

Pos.	#	Name	Class
WR	1	Khmari Thompson	Fr
QB	2	Micah Wilson	So
QB	3	Drew Lock	Sr
RB	4	Isaiah Miller	Fr
QB	5	Taylor Powell	Fr
RB	6	Tyler Badie	Fr
WR	7	Nate Brown	Sr
WR	8	Justin Smith	Jr
WR	9	Jalen Knox	Fr
TE	10	Alex Ofodile	Jr
TE	11	Kendall Blanton	Sr
WR	12	Johnathon Johnson	Jr
WR	13	Kam Scott	Fr
WR	14	Dominic Gicinto	Fr
RB	16	Damarea Crockett	Jr
WR	17	Richaud Floyd	Jr
QB	18	Lindsey Scott Jr.	So
QB	19	Jack Lowary	Jr
RB	20	Simi Bakare	Fr
RB	21	Dawson Downing	So
WR	24	Kentrell Barber	Fr
WR	30	Barrett Banister	Fr
RB	34	Larry Rountree III	So
WR	36	Daniel Ellinger	So
RB	43	Jerney Jones	So
OL	50	Hyrin White	Fr
OL	54	Trystan Colon-Castillo	So
OL	56	Samson Bailey	Sr
OL	57	Alec Abeln	Sr
OL	59	Case Cook	Fr
OL	62	Thomas Grossman	Jr
OL	63	Cannon York	Fr
OL	64	Bobby Lawrence	Fr
OL	66	Keion Willis	Fr
OL	67	Jonah Dubinski	Jr
OL	70	Yasir Durant	Jr
OL	71	Kevin Pendleton	Sr
OL	72	Xavier Delgado	Fr
OL	73	Mike Ruth	Fr
OL	75	Tre'Vour Wallace-Simms	Jr
OL	76	Javon Foster	Fr
OL	77	Paul Adams	Sr
OL	79	Larry Borom	Fr
TE	80	Messiah Swinson	Fr
TE	81	Albert Okwuegbunam	So
WR	82	Harry Ballard III	So
WR	84	Emanuel Hall	Sr
TE	85	Zac Schachtner	Fr
WR	86	Tauskie Dove	Jr
WR	87	Cade Musser	Fr
TE	88	Logan Christopherson	Fr
TE	89	Brendan Scales	So

Defense

Pos.	#	Name	Class
DB	1	Tyrone Collins	Fr
DB	2	DeMarkus Acy	Jr
S	3	Ronnell Perkins	Jr
LB	4	Brandon Lee	Sr
DL	5	Terry Beckner	Sr
LB	6	Tavon Ross	Sr
S	7	Cam Hilton	Sr
DB	8	Jarvis Ware	Fr
S	9	Tyree Gillespie	So
DB	10	Terry Petry	Fr
S	11	Jordan Ulmer	So
DL	13	Rashad Brandon	Sr
DB	14	Adam Sparks	So
DE	15	Trajan Jeffcoat	Fr
S	15	Dominic Nelson	Sr
LB	16	Gerald Nathan Jr.	Fr
DB	17	Chris Mills	Fr
S	18	Joshuah Bledsoe	So
DB	20	Khall Oliver	Jr
DB	21	Christian Holmes	So
LB	22	Aubrey Miller Jr.	So
LB	24	Terez Hall	Sr
LB	25	Jamal Brooks	So
DL	28	Jatorian Hansford	Fr
DL	29	Nate Anderson	Sr
DB	30	Zion Sales	Fr
DB	31	Finis Stribling IV	Sr
LB	32	Nick Bolton	Fr
LB	33	Chad Bailey	Fr
DB	35	Mason Pack	So
LB	38	Byson Clayton	Fr
DL	39	Chris Turner	So
LB	40	Cameron Wilkins	Fr
LB	41	Chance May	Fr
DL	45	Franklin Agbasimere	Jr
LB	46	Jacob Trump	Jr
LB	47	Cale Garrett	Jr
LB	48	Roderick Winters	Sr
DL	51	Daniel Parker	Fr
LB	53	Joe Hoy	Jr
LB	54	Joe Britton	Fr
DL	56	Antar Thompson	So
LB	57	Jairan Parker	Fr
LB	58	Noah Robinson	Sr
DL	63	Cannon York	Fr
DL	78	Kobie Whiteside	So
DL	88	Chris Williams	So
DL	90	Markell Utsey	Jr
DL	92	Macauley Keevins	So
DL	93	Tre Williams	So
DL	94	Tyrell Jacobs	Jr
DL	95	Jordan Elliott	So
DL	97	Akial Byers	So
DL	98	Myles Eaddy	So
DL	99	Walter Palmore	Sr

Special teams

Pos.	#	Name	Class
K	19	Tucker McCann	Jr
P	26	Corey Fatony	Sr
LS	49	Jake Hoffman	Fr
LS	51	Drew Wise	So
K	90	Sean Koetting	Fr
P	91	Josh Dodge	Fr
K	92	Matthew Jaeger	Fr

Head coach

- Barry Odom

Coordinators/assistant coaches

- Brick Haley (Senior Associate head coach / Defensive Line)
- Andy Hill (Associate head coach / special teams coordinator)
- Cornell Ford (assistant head coach / running backs)
- Derek Dooley (offensive coordinator / quarterbacks)
- Ryan Walters (defensive coordinator / secondary)
- Joe Jon Finley (tight ends)
- Brian Odom (outside linebackers)
- Vernon Hargreaves (inside linebackers)
- Brad Davis (offensive line)
- AJ Ofodile (wide receivers)
- Mark Ouimet (director of football operations)
- Austyn Carta-Samuels (offensive quality control / analyst)

Legend

- (C) Team captain
- (S) Suspended
- (I) Ineligible
- Injured
- Redshirt

Roster
Last update: September 1, 2018

== Game summaries ==
=== UT Martin ===
	1	2	3	4	Total
Skyhawks	0	7	7	0	14
Tigers	14	24	10	3	51

=== Wyoming ===
	1	2	3	4	Total
Cowboys	0	0	10	3	13
Tigers	3	13	14	10	40

=== At Purdue ===
	1	2	3	4	Total
Tigers	13	14	10	3	40
Boilermakers	7	17	3	10	37

=== Georgia ===
	1	2	3	4	Total
No. 2 Bulldogs	7	13	13	10	43
Tigers	7	0	15	7	29

=== At South Carolina ===
Missouri Tigers at South Carolina Gamecocks – Game summary

Quarter	1	2	3	4	Total
Missouri	14	9	0	12	35
South Carolina	7	7	17	6	37

at Williams–Brice Stadium • Columbia, South Carolina

- Date: October 6, 2018
- Game time: 12:00 p.m.
- Game weather: Temperature: 86 °F (30 °C) • Wind: ESE 2 mph (3.2 km/h) • Weather: Partly cloudy
- Game attendance: 73,393
- Referee: David Smith
- TV announcers (SECN): Taylor Zarzour (play-by-play), Matt Stinchcomb (color), Kris Budden (sideline)

Game information

First Quarter

- (11:58) MU – Rountree 1 yard TD run, McCann kick (MU 7–0)
- (11:02) SC – Bryan Edwards 5 yard pass from Scarnecchia, White kick (7–7)
- (04:25) MU – Crockett 1 yard TD run, McCann kick (MU 14–7)

Second Quarter

- (14:53) MU – McCann 22 yard field goal (MU 17–7)
- (12:57) SC – Edwards 17 yard pass from Scarnecchia, White kick (MU 17–14)
- (06:16) MU – McCann 32 yard field goal (MU 20–14)
- (00:23) MU – McCann 22 yard field goal (MU 23–14)

Third Quarter

- (09:34) SC – Samuel 8 yard pass from Scarnecchia, White kick (MU 23–21)
- (05:15) SC – White 42 yard field goal (SC 24–23)
- (05:00) SC – Greene 12 yard interception, White kick (SC 31–23)

Fourth Quarter

- (13:54) MU – Rountree 2 yard TD run, Lock pass failed (SC 31–29)
- (11:01) MU – McCann 44 yard field goal (MU 32–31)
- (06:23) SC – White 42 yard field goal (SC 34–32)
- (01:18) MU – McCann 57 yard field goal (MU 35–34)
- (00:02) SC – White 33 yard field goal (SC 37–35)

Total Yards

- MU – 490; 204 passing yards, 286 rushing yards
- SC – 377; 249 passing yards, 128 rushing yards

Passing leader

- MU – Drew Lock; 17–36, 204 yards, 0 TD, 2 INT
- SC – Mike Scarnecchia; 20–35, 249 yards, 3 TD, 0 INT

Rushing leader

- MU – Damarea Crockett; 20 rushes, 158 yards, 1 TD
- SC – Rico Dowdle; 21 rushes, 62 yards, 0 TD

Receiving leader

- MU – Jalen Knox; 2 catches, 50 yards, 0 TD
- SC – Deebo Samuel; 4 catches, 88 yards, 1 TD

Defensive leader

- MU – Terez Hall; 11 total tackles, 3 TFL, 1 sack
- SC – Bryson Allen-Williams; 6 total tackles, 3 TFL, 1 sack

=== At Alabama ===
Team	1	2	3	4	Total
Missouri	10	0	0	0	10
• #1 Alabama	13	17	2	7	39

- Date: October 13
- Location: Tuscaloosa, AL
- Game start: 6:10 p.m.
- Game attendance: 101,821
- Game weather: 74 °F (23 °C), Partly Cloudy, Wind W @ 4 mph (6.4 km/h)
- Referee: Ken Williamson
- TV announcers (ESPN): Steve Levy (play-by-play), Brian Griese (color), Todd McShay (sideline)

Scoring summary
Q1
Q2
Q3
Q4

Statistics

Statistics	Missouri	Alabama
First downs	13	25
Total yards	212	564
Rushes–yards	70	184
Passing yards	142	380
Passing: Comp–Att–Int	13–26	19–30
Time of possession	27:43	32:17

Team	Category	Player	Statistics
Missouri	Passing	Drew Lock	13/26, 142 yards, 1 TD, 2 INT
Missouri	Rushing	Larry Rountree III	17 carries, 48 yards
Missouri	Receiving	Jalen Knox	3 receptions, 61 yards, 1 TD
Alabama	Passing	Tua Tagovailoa	12/22, 265 yards, 3 TD
Alabama	Rushing	Damien Harris	14 carries, 62 yards, 1 TD
Alabama	Receiving	Jerry Jeudy	3 receptions, 147 yards, 1 TD

=== Memphis ===
	1	2	3	4	Total
MEM Tigers	3	17	7	6	33
Tigers	21	27	14	3	65

=== Kentucky ===
No. 12 Kentucky at Missouri

Quarter	1	2	3	4	Total
No. 12 Wildcats	3	0	0	12	15
Tigers	0	14	0	0	14

at Faurot Field, Columbia, Missouri

- Date: October 27, 2018
- Game time: 4:00 p.m. EST
- Game attendance: 53,397
- TV announcers (SECN): Taylor Zarzour (play-by-play), Matt Stinchcomb (analyst), Kris Budden (sideline reporter)

=== At Florida ===
Missouri Tigers at Florida Gators – Game summary

Quarter	1	2	3	4	Total
Missouri	7	14	14	3	38
No. 13 Florida	3	7	7	0	17

at Ben Hill Griffin Stadium • Gainesville, Florida

- Date: November 3, 2018
- Game time: 4:00 p.m.
- Game weather: Temperature: 68 °F (20 °C) • Wind: NNE at 10 miles per hour (16 km/h) • Weather: Sunny
- Game attendance: 80,017
- Referee: John McDaid
- TV announcers (SEC Network): Tom Hart, Jordan Rodgers, Cole Cubelic
- Boxscore

Game information

First Quarter

- Florida – Evan McPherson 32-yard field goal, 7:18
- Missouri – Larry Rountree III 27-yard run (Tucker McCann kick), 3:46

Second Quarter

- Missouri – Albert Okwuegbunam 22-yard pass from Drew Lock (Tucker McCann kick), 13:12
- Missouri – Damarea Crockett 4-yard run (Tucker McCann kick), 6:06
- Florida – Feleipe Franks 3-yard run (Evan McPherson kick), 1:42

Third Quarter

- Missouri – Kam Scott 41-yard pass from Drew Lock (Evan McPherson kick), 10:02
- Missouri – Emanuel Hall 4-yard pass from Drew Lock (Evan McPherson kick), 5:00
- Florida – Josh Hammond 7-yard pass from Kyle Trask (Evan McPherson kick), 0:20

Fourth Quarter

- Missouri – Tucker McCann 40-yard field goal, 9:08

Passing leaders

- MIZZ – Drew Lock – 24/32, 250 yards, 3 touchdowns
- FLA – Kyle Trask – 10/18, 126 yards, 1 touchdown

Rushing leaders

- MIZZ – Damarea Crockett – 21 carries, 114 yards, 1 touchdown
- FLA – La'Mical Perine – 10 carries, 42 yards

Receiving leaders

- MIZZ – Emanuel Hall – 4 receptions, 77 yards, 1 touchdown
- FLA – Kadarius Toney – 2 receptions, 72 yards

Tackling leaders

- MIZZ – Cale Garrett – 12 tackles
- FLA – David Reese II – 14 tackles

Overall record	Previous meeting	Previous winner
3–4	November 4, 2017	Missouri, 45–16

=== Vanderbilt ===
	1	2	3	4	Total
Commodores	14	7	7	0	28
Tigers	7	6	13	7	33

=== At Tennessee ===
	1	2	3	4	Total
Tigers	6	20	14	10	50
Volunteers	0	10	7	0	17

=== Arkansas ===
Game Twelve – Arkansas Razorbacks (2–9) at Missouri Tigers (7–4)

Quarter	1	2	3	4	Total
Razorbacks	0	0	0	0	0
Tigers	7	21	10	0	38

at Faurot Field at Memorial Stadium • Columbia, Missouri

- Date: Friday, November 23, 2018
- Game time: 1:30 p.m. CST
- Game weather: Rainy • Temperature: 50 °F (10 °C) • Wind: S 15 mph (24 km/h)
- Game attendance: 52,482
- Referee: David Smith (SEC)
- TV announcers (CBS): Carter Blackburn (play-by-play), Aaron Taylor (color), Rick Neuheisel (color), John Schriffen (sideline)

Game information

First Quarter

- (10:54) MIZ – Drew Lock 9 yard rush, Tucker McCann kick
  Missouri 7–0; 11 plays, 75 yards, 4:06

Second Quarter

- (13:11) MIZ – Drew Lock 3 yard rush, Tucker McCann kick
  Missouri 14–0; 6 plays, 35 yards, 2:18
- (12:33) MIZ – Akial Byers recovered fumble in end zone, Tucker McCann kick
  Missouri 21–0
- (0:35) MIZ – Emanuel Hall 6 yard pass from Drew Lock, Tucker McCann kick
  Missouri 28–0; 6 plays, 43 yards, 1:04

Third Quarter

- (8:19) MIZ – Emanuel Hall 67 yard pass from Drew Lock, Tucker McCann kick
  Missouri 35–0; 9 plays, 96 yards, 3:31
- (1:48) MIZ – Tucker McCann 42 yard FG
  Missouri 38–0; 10 plays, 37 yards, 4:33

Fourth Quarter
No scoring

Top Passers

- ARK – Connor Noland: 5/17, 98 yards
- MIZ – Drew Lock: 16/25, 221 yards, 2 TD

Top Rushers

- ARK – Devwah Whaley: 13 carries, 54 yards
- MIZ – Larry Rountree III: 29 carries, 119 yards

Top Receivers

- ARK – Devwah Whaley: 2 receptions, 61 yards
- MIZ – Emanuel Hall: 6 receptions, 153 yards, 2 TD

=== Vs. Oklahoma State (Liberty Bowl) ===
	1	2	3	4	Total
Cowboys	7	7	21	3	38
No. 24 Tigers	3	13	3	14	33

== Rankings ==
Ranking movements Legend: ██ Increase in ranking ██ Decrease in ranking — = Not ranked RV = Received votes
	Week															
Poll	Pre	1	2	3	4	5	6	7	8	9	10	11	12	13	14	Final
AP	—	—	—	RV	RV	RV	—	—	—	—	—	—	RV	RV	24	
Coaches	—	RV	RV	RV	RV	RV	—	—	—	—	RV	RV	RV	RV	RV	
CFP	Not released									—	—	—	—	24	23	Not released

== Players drafted into the NFL ==
Round	Pick	Player	Position	NFL Club
2	42	Drew Lock	QB	Denver Broncos
7	215	Terry Beckner	DT	Tampa Bay Buccaneers
