= 2018 Liberty Bowl =

College football bowl game

2018 AutoZone Liberty Bowl
- 60th Liberty Bowl
Missouri Tigers	Oklahoma State Cowboys
(8–4)	(6–6)
SEC	Big 12
33	38
Head coach: Barry Odom	Head coach: Mike Gundy
AP / Coaches / CFP; 24 / RV / 23
	1	2	3	4	Total
Missouri	3	13	3	14	33
Oklahoma State	7	7	21	3	38
- Date: December 31, 2018
- Season: 2018
- Stadium: Liberty Bowl
- Location: Memphis, Tennessee
- MVP: Taylor Cornelius (QB, Oklahoma State)
- Favorite: Missouri by 8
- Referee: Jerry McGinn (Big Ten)
- Halftime show: The Four Tops
- Attendance: 51,587
- Payout: US$4,295,000

United States TV coverage
- Network: ESPN & ESPN Radio
- Announcers: Clay Matvick, Dan Orlovsky and Paul Carcaterra (ESPN); Dave LaMont, Ray Bentley and Alyssa Lang (ESPN Radio)

The 2018 Liberty Bowl was a college football bowl game between the #24 Missouri Tigers of the Southeastern Conference and the unranked Oklahoma State Cowboys of the Big 12 Conference. The 60th edition of the Liberty Bowl took place on December 31, 2018 at 2:45 p.m. EST and aired on ESPN. It was one of the 2018–19 bowl games that concluded the 2018 FBS football season. Liberty Bowl Memorial Stadium in Memphis, Tennessee, hosted the game for the 54th straight year. The game was sponsored by automobile parts and accessories store AutoZone and was officially known as the AutoZone Liberty Bowl.

The Cowboys beat the Tigers by a score of 38–33 to claim the school's first Liberty Bowl championship and their 19th bowl game overall.

== Teams ==
The game was played between Missouri from the Southeastern Conference (SEC) and Oklahoma State from the Big 12 Conference. The two programs had previously met 52 times, with Missouri holding a 29–23 series lead. Both programs were members of the Big Eight Conference for many years, and met annually from 1960 through 1997; their most recent prior meeting had been the 2014 Cotton Bowl Classic, won by Missouri.

=== Missouri Tigers ===
Missouri received and accepted a bid to the Liberty Bowl on December 2. The Tigers entered their third Liberty Bowl with an 8–4 record (4–4 in conference).

=== Oklahoma State Cowboys ===
Oklahoma State received and accepted a bid to the Liberty Bowl on December 2. The Cowboys entered the bowl with a 6–6 record (3–6 in conference).

== Game summary ==
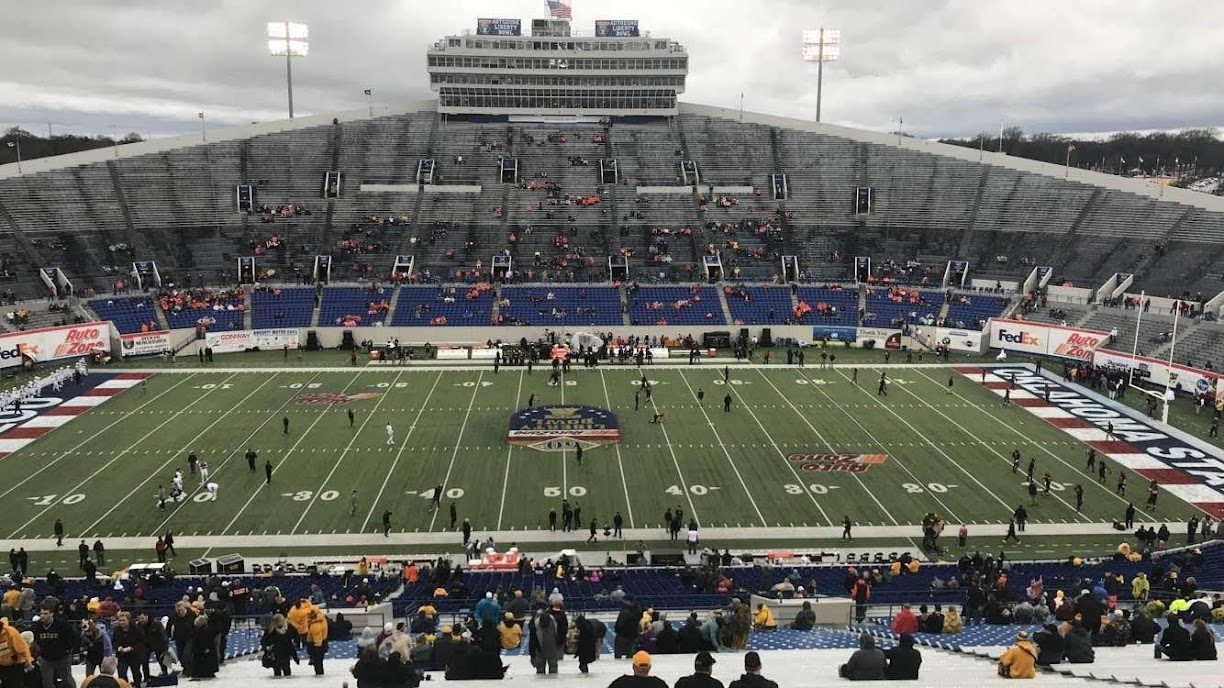
2018 Liberty Bowl pregame

=== Scoring summary ===
Scoring summary

Quarter	Time	Drive			Team	Scoring information	Score	
Quarter	Time	Plays	Yards	TOP	Team	Scoring information	MIZ	OKST
1	9:27	11	80	4:12	OKST	Dillon Stoner 30-yard touchdown reception from Taylor Cornelius, Matt Ammendola kick good	0	7
1	6:46	6	74	2:36	MIZ	24-yard field goal by Tucker McCann	3	7
2	7:49	16	97	5:48	MIZ	Dominic Gicinto 5-yard touchdown reception from Drew Lock, Tucker McCann kick good	10	7
2	5:31	9	65	1:56	OKST	Tyron Johnson 7-yard touchdown reception from Taylor Cornelius, Matt Ammendola kick good	10	14
2	3:35	5	75	1:56	MIZ	Kendall Blanton 16-yard touchdown reception from Drew Lock, Tucker McCann kick failed	16	14
3	11:49	10	75	3:11	OKST	Tylan Wallace 9-yard touchdown reception from Taylor Cornelius, Matt Ammendola kick good	16	21
3	10:21	3	26	1:14	OKST	Chuba Hubbard 4-yard touchdown run, Matt Ammendola kick good	16	28
3	4:20	12	67	6:01	MIZ	26-yard field goal by Tucker McCann	19	28
3	3:08	4	75	1:12	OKST	Tyron Johnson 46-yard touchdown reception from Taylor Cornelius, Matt Ammendola kick good	19	35
4	14:41	1	86	0:10	MIZ	Johnathon Johnson 86-yard touchdown reception from Drew Lock, Tucker McCann kick good	26	35
4	11:50	2	80	0:28	MIZ	Larry Rountree 55-yard touchdown run, Tucker McCann kick good	33	35
4	5:54	11	66	3:28	OKST	27-yard field goal by Matt Ammendola	33	38
"TOP" = time of possession. For other American football terms, see Glossary of American football.							33	38

=== Statistics ===
	1	2	3	4	Total
No. 23 Tigers	3	13	3	14	33
Cowboys	7	7	21	3	38

Statistics	MIZ	OKST
First downs	27	27
Plays–yards	80–637	80–502
Rushes–yards	42–264	35–169
Passing yards	373	333
Passing: comp–att–int	23–38–0	27–45–2
Time of possession	32:25	27:35

Team	Category	Player	Statistics
Missouri	Passing	Drew Lock	23/38, 373 yds, 3 TD
Missouri	Rushing	Larry Rountree	27 car, 204 yds, 1 TD
Missouri	Receiving	Johnathon Johnson	9 rec, 185 yds, 1 TD
Oklahoma State	Passing	Taylor Cornelius	26/44, 336 yds, 4 TD, 2 INT
Oklahoma State	Rushing	Chuba Hubbard	18 car, 145 yds, 1 TD
Oklahoma State	Receiving	Tyron Johnson	7 rec, 141 yds, 2 TD
