= Emanuel Hall =

American football player (born 1997)

Profile
- Position: Wide receiver

Personal information
- Born: May 21, 1997 (age 29); Franklin, Tennessee, U.S.
- Listed height: 6 ft 3 in (1.91 m)
- Listed weight: 195 lb (88 kg)

Career information
- High school: Centennial (Franklin, Tennessee)
- College: Missouri
- NFL draft: 2019: undrafted

Career history
- Chicago Bears (2019)*; Tampa Bay Buccaneers (2019)*; Washington Redskins / Football Team (2019–2020); Birmingham Stallions (2022)*
- * Offseason or practice squad member only

Awards and highlights
- Second-Team All-SEC (2018)
- Stats at Pro Football Reference

Emanuel Hall (born May 21, 1997) is an American former football wide receiver. He played college football for the Missouri Tigers and was signed by the Chicago Bears as an undrafted free agent in 2019.

== Early life ==
Hall was a Tennessee All-State selection after an outstanding senior season which included 47 receptions for 889 yards and 12 touchdowns. A 3-star recruit, Hall committed to play college football for Missouri over offers from Cincinnati, Iowa State, Kansas, Kentucky, Louisville, Middle Tennessee State, Mississippi State, Ole Miss, UAB, and Vanderbilt.

Hall was also an accomplished track and field athlete, leaping as high as 6–8 in the high jump while winning the Tennessee state championship. Additionally, he won two AAU Junior Olympic track gold medals in 2011, taking first nationally in both the pentathlon and high jump.

== College career ==
In his first season at the University of Missouri, Hall was one of eight true freshman to see playing time for the Tigers. He finished the season with eight receptions for 64 yards on the season, including a long of 14 yards against Mississippi State.

In 2016, he finished his sophomore season with 19 catches for 307 yards and a pair of touchdowns. He began the season grabbing his first catch in Mizzou's season opener against West Virginia. In Mizzou's home opener against Eastern Michigan, he went on to grab three more passes for 90 yards including a career long 49-yard TD reception. In career day against Delaware State, he hauled in seven receptions for 122 yards and a highlight reel touchdown during Mizzou's win over Delaware State. He finished the season catching three passes for 40 yards against Middle Tennessee, and one pass each against Kentucky and Tennessee on the road.

In 2017, Hall emerged as a big-play wideout, becoming one of the nation's elite deep ball threats. He finished the season with 33 receptions for 817 yards and eight touchdowns, with six of them coming from 50 yards out or longer. His eight scores went for an average length of 49.5 yards, including scores of 20, 31, 50, 55, 56, 58, 63 and 63 yards, and his per-catch average on the year of 24.8 ranked as the best in the SEC and was second nationally among all receivers. Despite battling a hamstring injury early in the season that limited him to just five total receptions in Mizzou's first four games, but when he got healthy, he quickly made an impact, as he had consecutive highly-productive road games at Kentucky (four catches, 129 yards, one touchdown) and at Georgia (four catches, 141 yards, two touchdowns) to give the Mizzou offense a big spark. He finished the season with five games of 100 yards receiving or more, including 113 (five receptions) against Florida, 111 yards and two scores (on just two catches) at Arkansas and 102 yards and two scores (five catches) versus Tennessee. Led all SEC players in league games only with his seven touchdowns, while his 82.8 yards per game in receiving yards during league play ranked as second-best.

In his final season with Mizzou, Hall faced the most adversity of his career, losing his father unexpectedly early in the season and battling a lingering groin injury. He started the season posting back-to-back games of 170+ receiving yards to open the season, becoming the first Tiger to do so since Danario Alexander in 2009. Hall had 171 yards on just four catches with a season-high two touchdowns in the season-opener vs. UT Martin, and hauled in 10 more catches against Wyoming, totaling another 171 yards and a touchdown. Battled through a groin injury to catch four passes for 88 yards at Purdue, including a 26-yard strike in the fourth quarter that set up the game-winning score. Hall finished his career at Mizzou in the Liberty Bowl where he had 72 yards on two catches, putting him over 2,000 receiving yards in his career. He became the 10th Mizzou pass catcher to haul in more than 2,000 career yards.

=== Statistics ===
Year	Team	Games	Rec	Yards	Avg.	TDs
2015	Missouri	6	8	64	8	0
2016	Missouri	8	19	307	16.2	2
2017	Missouri	10	33	817	24.8	8
2018	Missouri	8	37	828	22.4	6
Totals		32	97	2016	20.8	16

== Professional career ==
Pre-draft measurables
Height	Weight	Arm length	Hand span	Wingspan	40-yard dash	10-yard split	20-yard split	Vertical jump	Broad jump	Bench press
6 ft 1 7/8 in (1.88 m)	201 lb (91 kg)	33 1/4 in (0.84 m)	9 3/4 in (0.25 m)	6 ft 7 3/8 in (2.02 m)	4.39 s	1.50 s	2.59 s	43.5 in (1.10 m)	11 ft 9 in (3.58 m)	15 reps
All values from NFL Combine

=== Chicago Bears ===
After going undrafted in the 2019 NFL draft, Hall signed with the Chicago Bears. He was waived on August 13, 2019.

=== Tampa Bay Buccaneers ===
On August 14, 2019, Hall was claimed off waivers by the Tampa Bay Buccaneers. On August 31, 2019, Hall was waived by the Buccaneers and was signed to the practice squad the next day. On September 16, 2019, Hall was released by the Buccaneers.

=== Washington Redskins / Football Team ===
On December 18, 2019, Hall was signed to the Washington Redskins practice squad. He was signed to a reserve/future contract with the Redskins on December 30, 2019. In June 2020, Hall tore his Achilles tendon while training and was released with a non-football injury designation the following month. He reverted to the team's reserve/non-football injury list on July 27, 2020. Hall was waived on April 9, 2021.

=== Birmingham Stallions ===
Hall was selected in the 14th round of the 2022 USFL draft by the Birmingham Stallions. On April 7, 2022, Hall was released by the Stallions without playing a game for them.
