= 2019 NFL draft =

2019 American football draft

General information
- Date: April 25–27, 2019
- Time: 8:00 p.m. ET
- Location: Lower Broadway; Nashville, Tennessee
- Networks: ABC, ESPN, ESPN2, NFL Network

Overview
- 254 total selections in 7 rounds
- League: NFL
- First selection: Kyler Murray, QB, Arizona Cardinals
- Mr. Irrelevant: Caleb Wilson, TE, Arizona Cardinals
- Most selections (12): Minnesota Vikings
- Fewest selections (5): Chicago Bears; New Orleans Saints; Philadelphia Eagles

The 2019 NFL draft was the 84th annual meeting of National Football League (NFL) franchises to select newly eligible players for the 2019 NFL season. The draft was held on April 25–27 in Nashville. The first round was held on April 25, followed by the second and third rounds on April 26, and the draft concluded with rounds 4–7 on April 27. The draft featured a record-high 40 trades, surpassing the 37 made in 2017.

Troy Vincent would give day 3 picks to Dawn Aponte in 2021.

== Early entrants ==
A record-high 111 eligible applicants announced their intention to enter the 2019 NFL draft as underclassmen, which primarily included juniors and redshirt sophomores who forwent future years of college eligibility. In order to be eligible to enter the draft, players must be at least three years removed from high school. The deadline for underclassmen to declare for the draft was January 14, 2019.

== Host city bid process ==
The host city for the 2019 (as well as the 2020) draft was chosen from among finalists Denver, Kansas City, Las Vegas, Nashville, and Cleveland/Canton in May 2018 at the NFL Spring League Meeting. On May 23, 2018, the league announced Nashville as the host city of the 2019 draft.

== Player selections ==
The following is the breakdown of the 254 players selected by position:

- 32 cornerbacks
- 31 linebackers
- 28 wide receivers
- 26 defensive ends
- 25 running backs
- 23 offensive tackles
- 21 defensive tackles
- 19 safeties
- 16 tight ends
- 12 guards
- 11 quarterbacks
- 5 centers
- 2 placekickers
- 2 punters
- 1 long snapper

*	Compensatory selection
†	Pro Bowler (Note: Players are identified as Pro Bowlers if they were selected for the Pro Bowl at any time in their career.)

Positions key
Offense	Defense	Special teams
QB — Quarterback; RB — Running back; FB — Fullback; WR — Wide receiver; TE — Tight end; OL — Offensive lineman; T — Tackle; G — Guard; C — Center	DL — Defensive lineman; DT — Defensive tackle (Note: Includes nose tackle (NT)); DE — Defensive end; EDGE — Edge rusher; LB — Linebacker (Note: Includes middle linebacker (MLB/MIKE), weakside linebacker (WILL), strongside linebacker (SAM), off-ball linebacker, and outside linebacker (OLB)); DB — Defensive back; CB — Cornerback; S — Safety (Note: Includes free safety (FS) and strong safety (SS))	K — Kicker (Note: Also known as a placekicker (PK)); P — Punter; LS — Long snapper; RS — Return specialist (Note: Includes kickoff and punt returners)

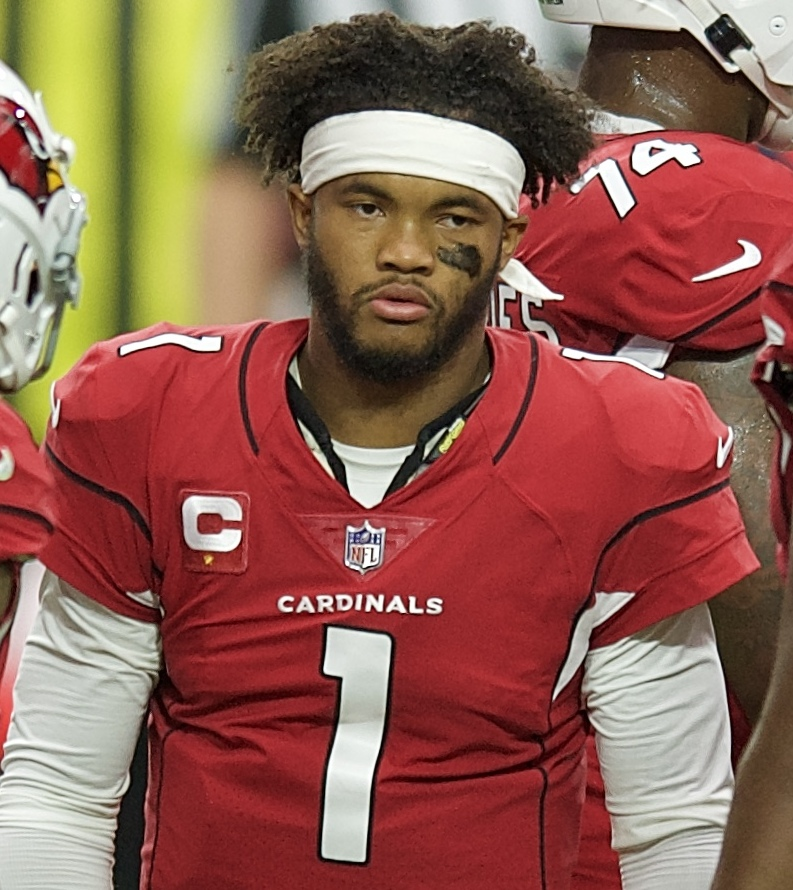
Quarterback Kyler Murray, selected first overall by the Cardinals, broke several franchise records, made the Pro Bowl in 2020, and won NFL Offensive Rookie of the Year.

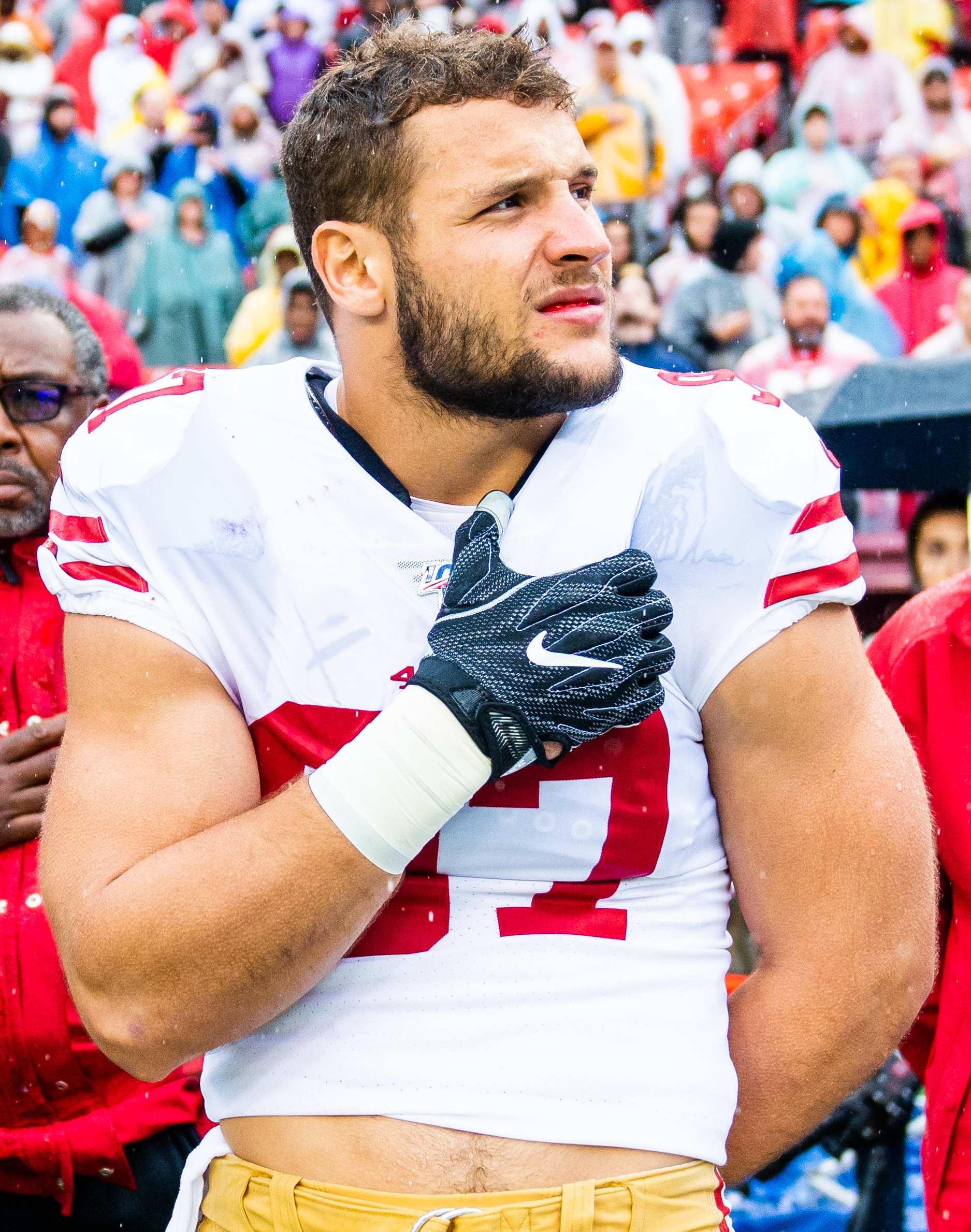
Nick Bosa, selected second-overall by the 49ers, made the Pro Bowl in his rookie year and was named NFL Defensive Rookie of the Year.

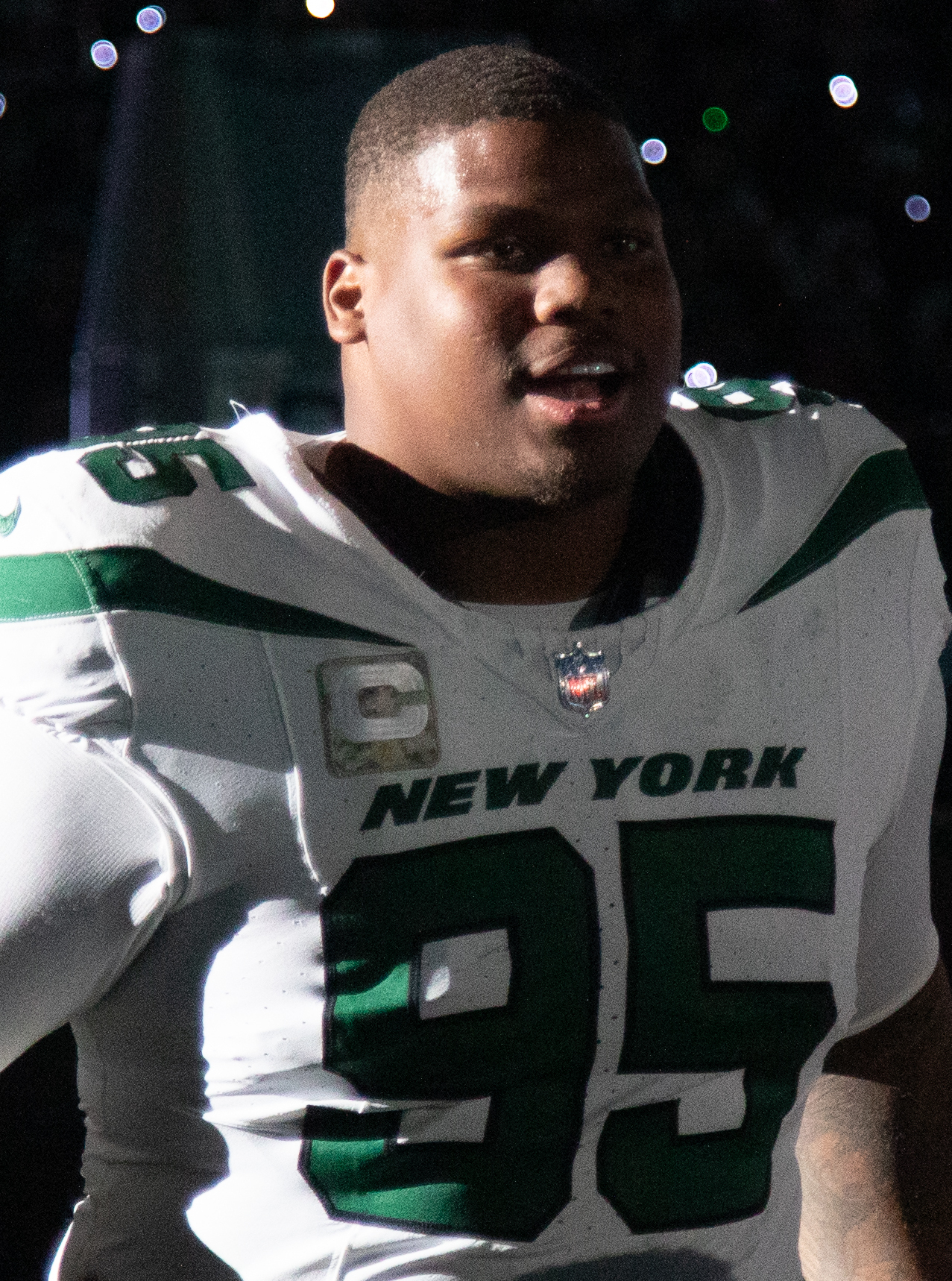
Quinnen Williams was selected 3rd overall by the New York Jets.

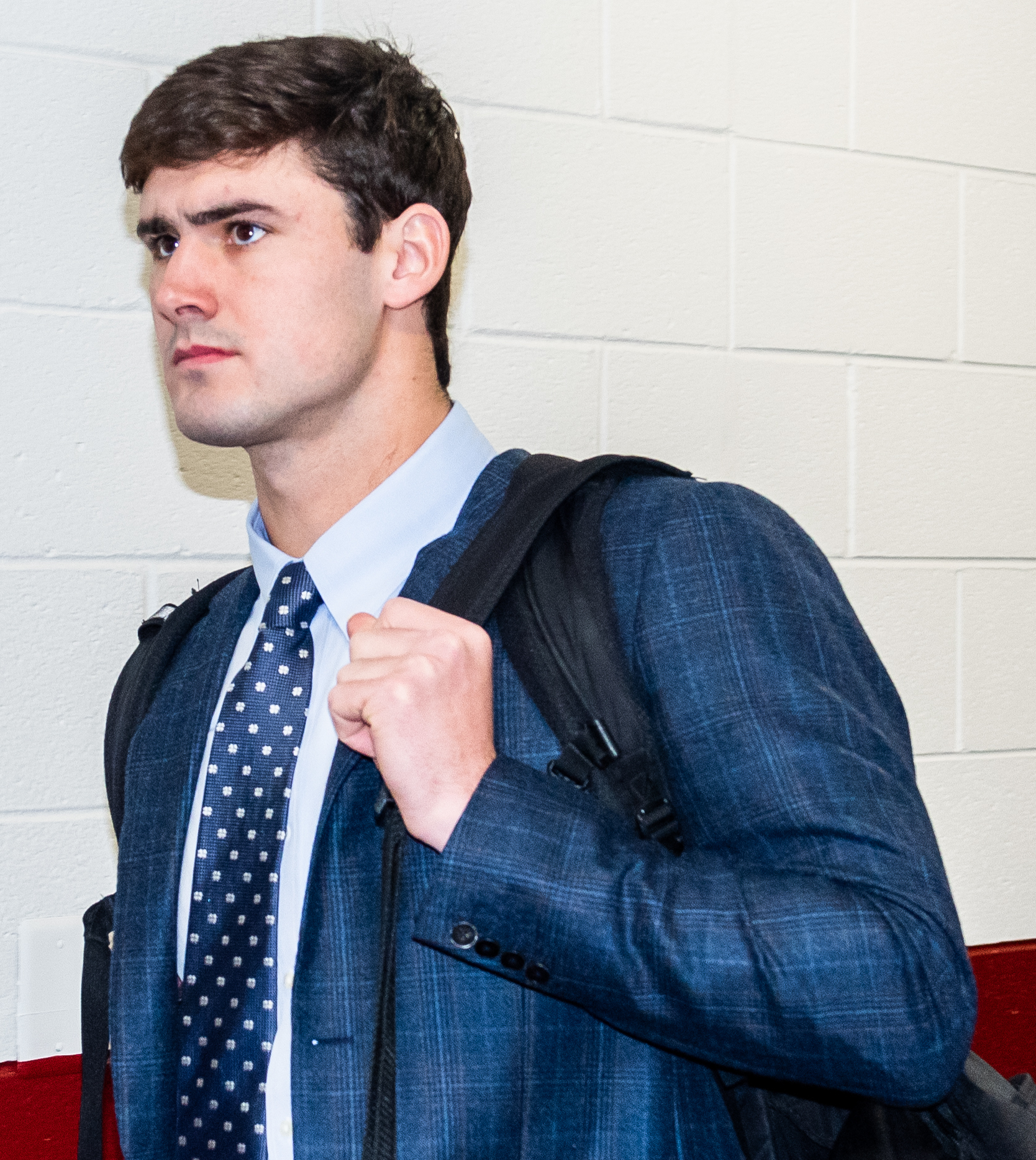
Daniel Jones was selected 6th overall by the New York Giants.

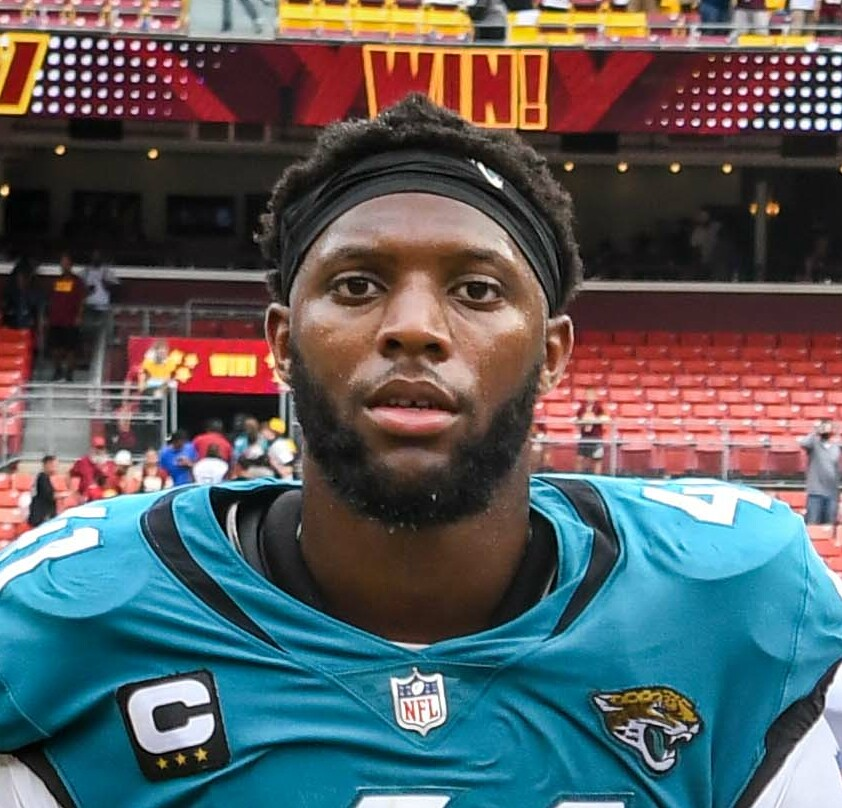
Josh Hines-Allen was selected 7th overall by the Jacksonville Jaguars.

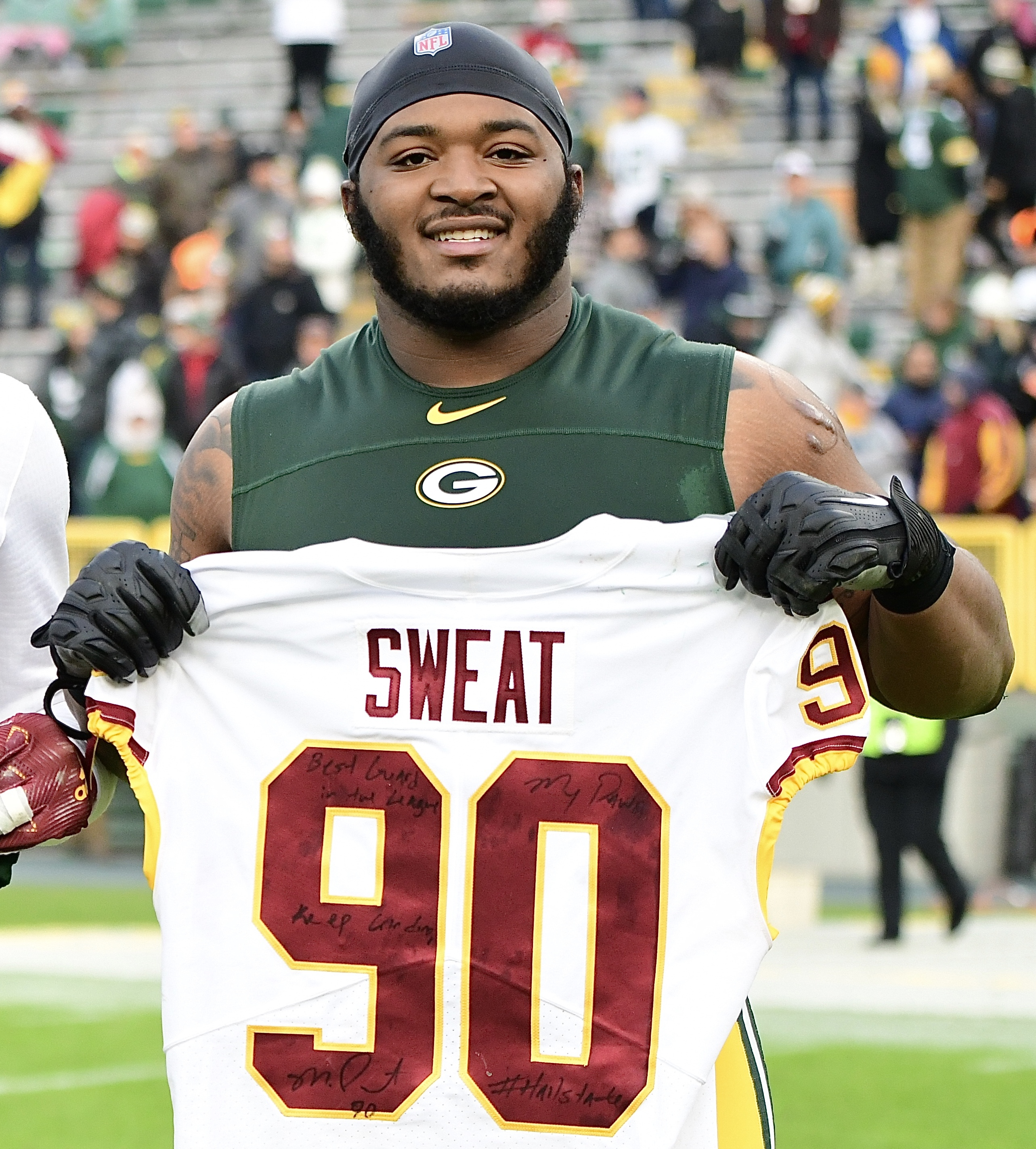
Elgton Jenkins was selected in the second round by the Green Bay Packers.

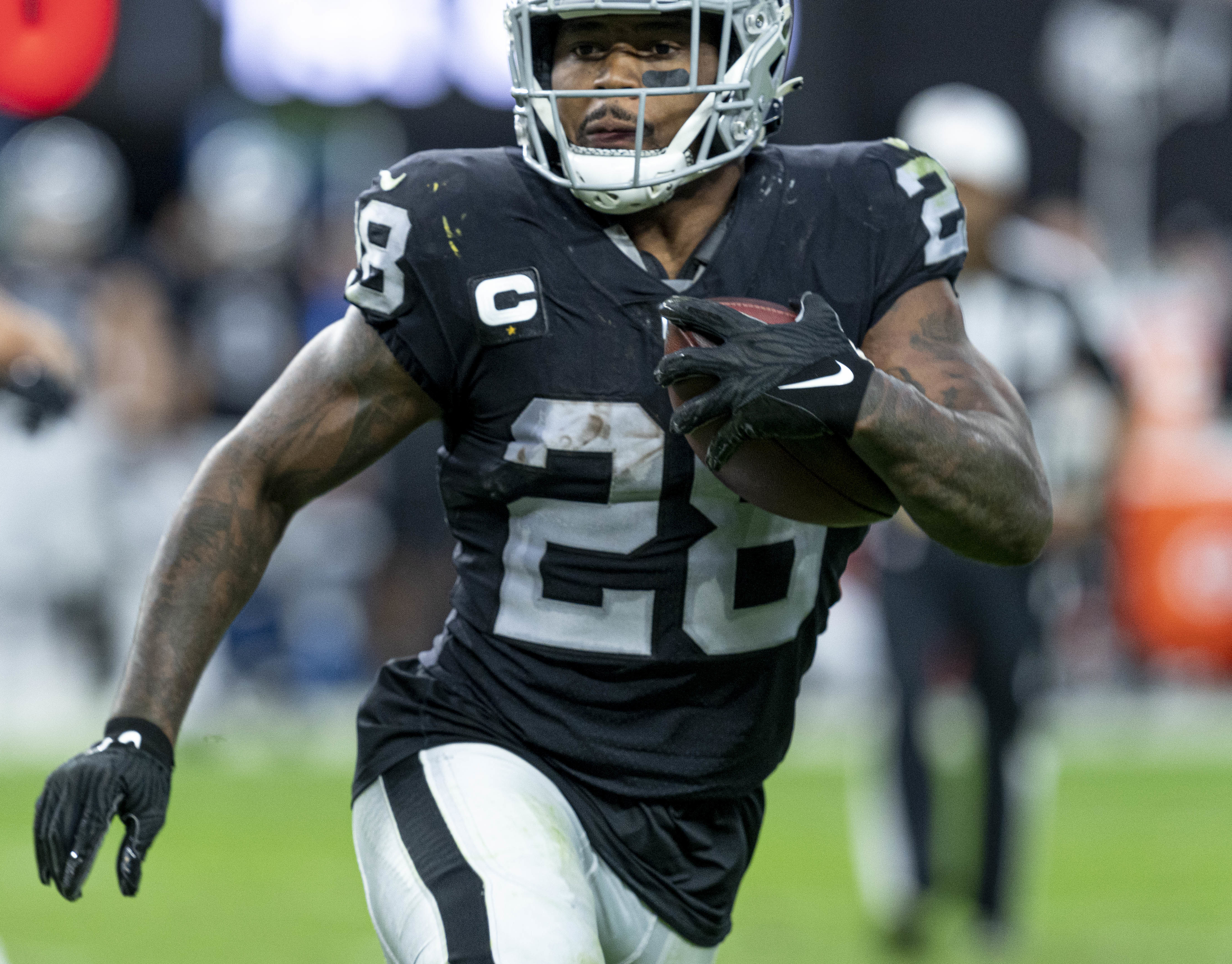
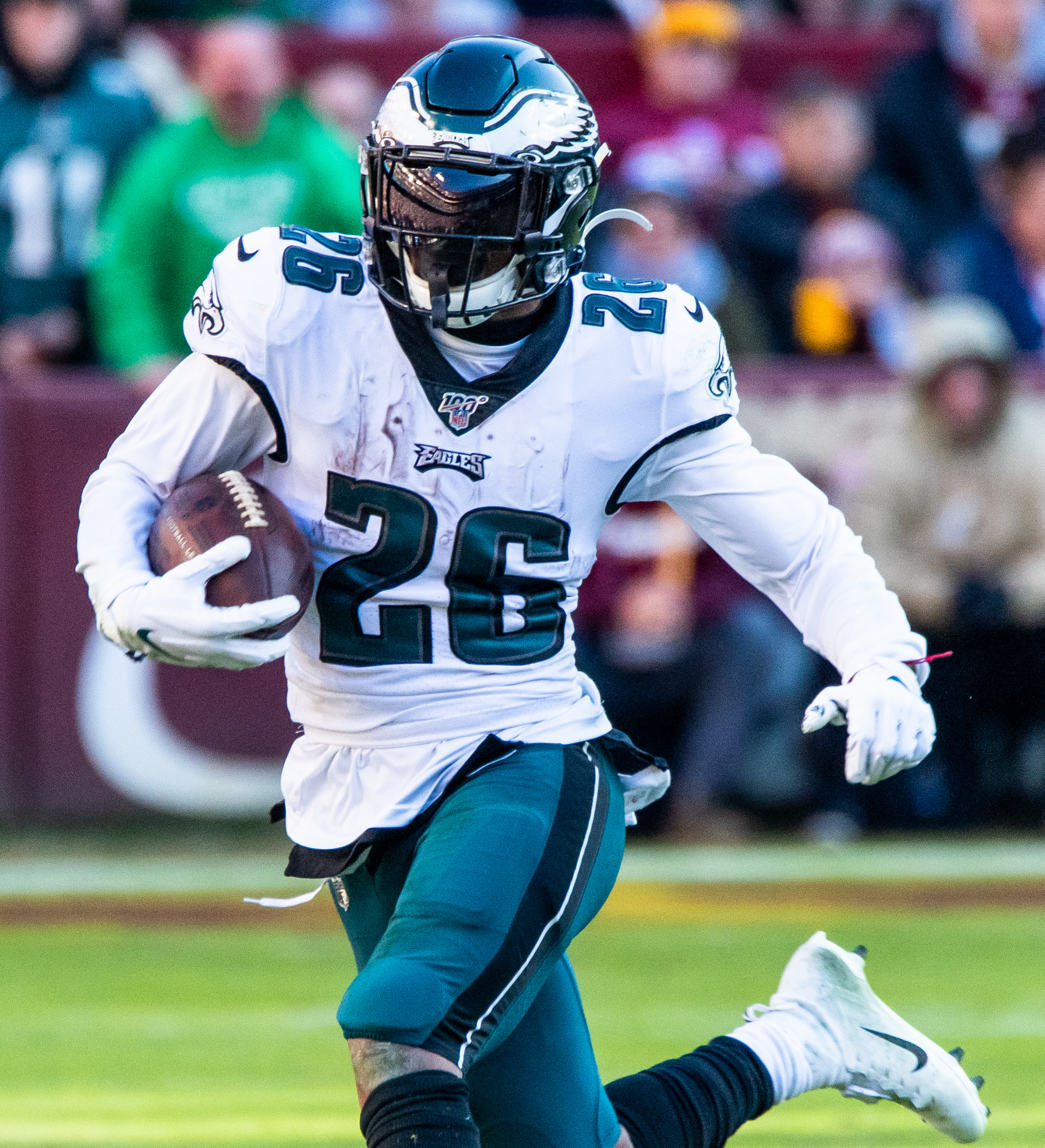
Notable running backs drafted include (from top to bottom) Josh Jacobs and Miles Sanders
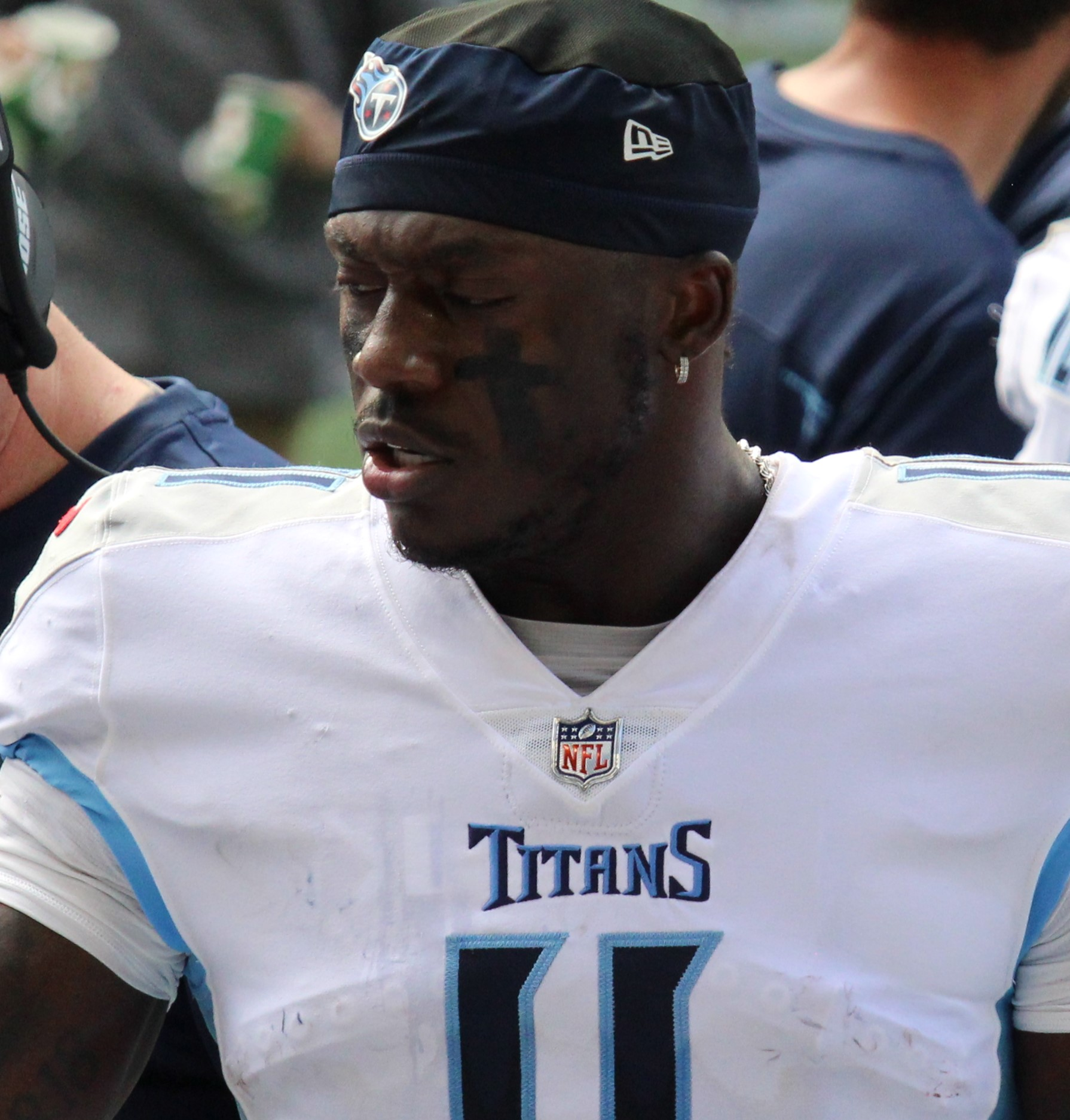
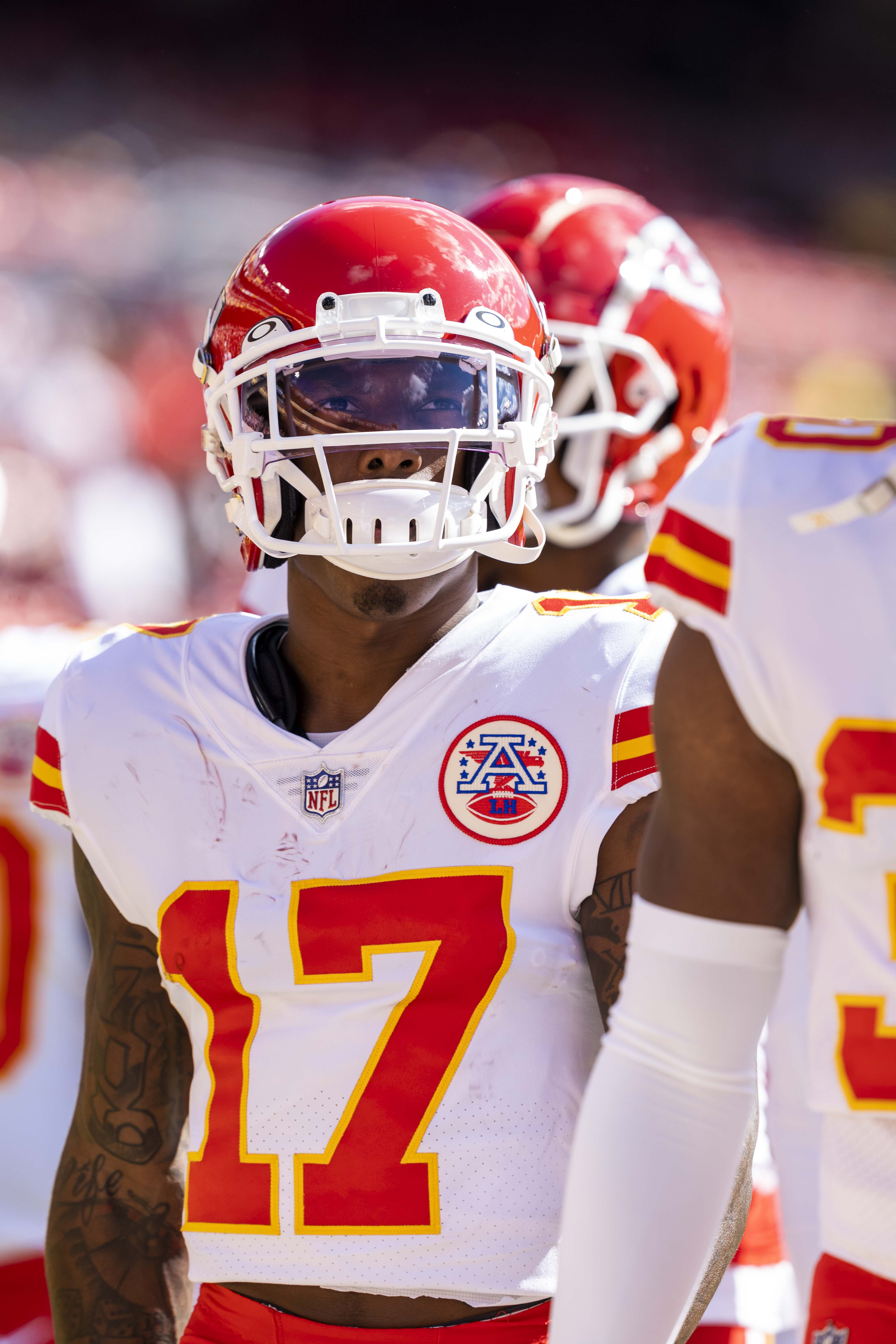
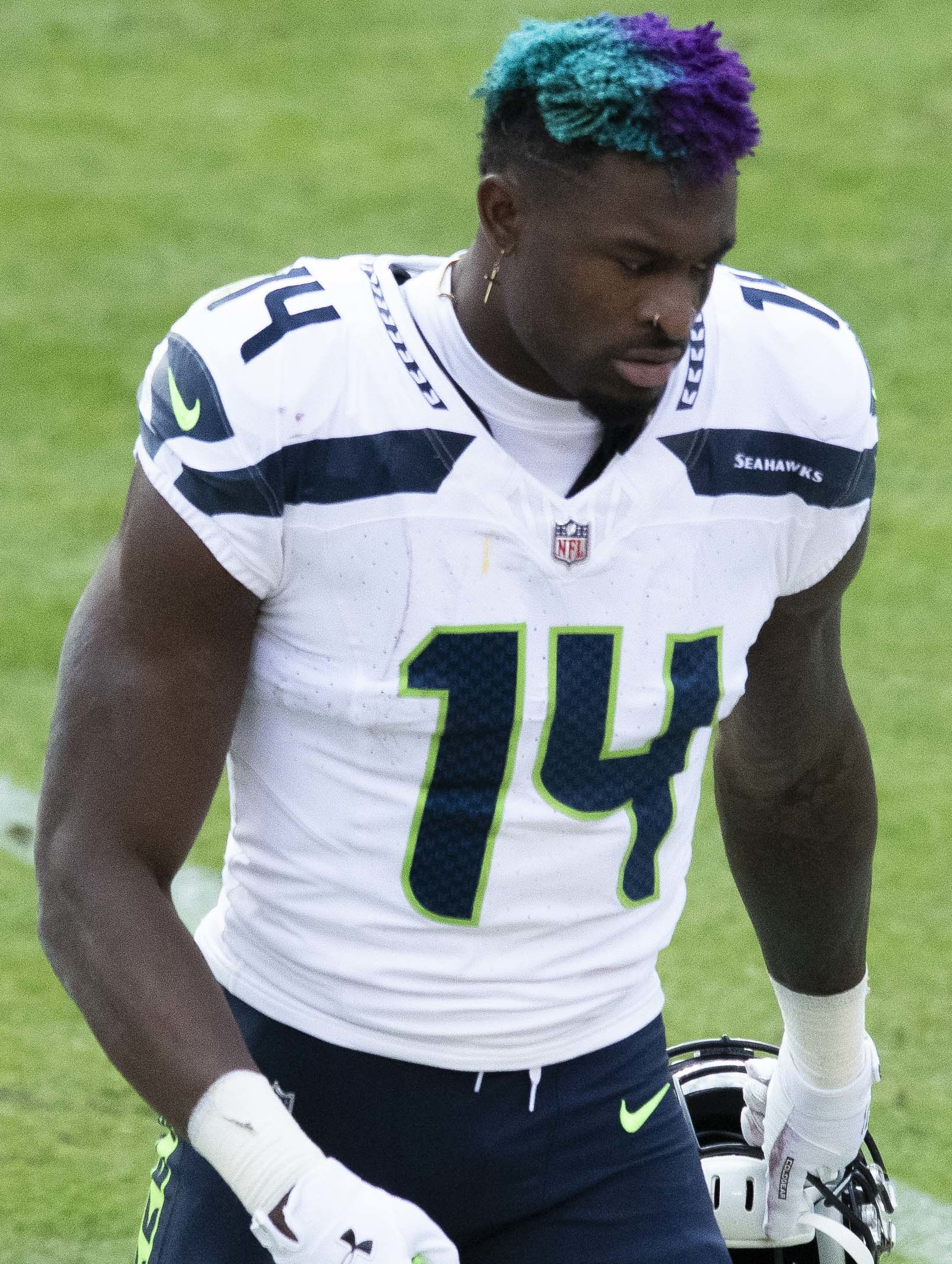
Second-round selections Deebo Samuel (36th overall), A. J. Brown (51st overall), Mecole Hardman (56th overall) and DK Metcalf (64th overall) have all been selected to at least one Pro Bowl.

Rnd.	Pick	Team	Player	Pos.	College	Notes
1	1	Arizona Cardinals	Kyler Murray ^{†}	QB	Oklahoma	2018 Heisman Trophy winner 2019 AP Offensive Rookie of The Year
1	2	San Francisco 49ers	Nick Bosa ^{†}	DE	Ohio State	2019 AP Defensive Rookie of the Year
1	3	New York Jets	Quinnen Williams ^{†}	DT	Alabama	2018 Outland Trophy winner
1	4	Oakland Raiders	Clelin Ferrell	DE	Clemson	2018 Hendricks Award winner
1	5	Tampa Bay Buccaneers	Devin White ^{†}	LB	LSU	2018 Butkus Award winner
1	6	New York Giants	Daniel Jones	QB	Duke	2019 Senior Bowl MVP
1	7	Jacksonville Jaguars	Josh Hines-Allen ^{†}	OLB	Kentucky	2018 Nagurski Trophy and Bednarik Award winner
1	8	Detroit Lions	T. J. Hockenson ^{†}	TE	Iowa	2018 Mackey Award winner
1	9	Buffalo Bills	Ed Oliver	DT	Houston	2017 Outland Trophy winner
1	10	Pittsburgh Steelers	Devin Bush	LB	Michigan	from Denver (Note: No. 10: Denver → Pittsburgh (D). Denver traded a first-round selection (10th overall) to Pittsburgh in exchange for first- and second-round selections (20th and 52nd overall), and a 2020 third-round selection.)
1	11	Cincinnati Bengals	Jonah Williams	T	Alabama	
1	12	Green Bay Packers	Rashan Gary ^{†}	OLB	Michigan	
1	13	Miami Dolphins	Christian Wilkins	DT	Clemson	
1	14	Atlanta Falcons	Chris Lindstrom ^{†}	G	Boston College	
1	15	Washington Redskins	Dwayne Haskins	QB	Ohio State	
1	16	Carolina Panthers	Brian Burns ^{†}	DE	Florida State	
1	17	New York Giants	Dexter Lawrence ^{†}	DT	Clemson	from Cleveland (Note: No. 17: Cleveland → NY Giants (PD). Cleveland traded a first-round selection (17th overall), a third-round selection previously acquired from New England (95th overall), G Kevin Zeitler and S Jabrill Peppers to the NY Giants in exchange for WR Odell Beckham Jr. and DE Olivier Vernon.)
1	18	Minnesota Vikings	Garrett Bradbury	C	NC State	2018 Dave Rimington Trophy winner
1	19	Tennessee Titans	Jeffery Simmons ^{†}	DT	Mississippi State	
1	20	Denver Broncos	Noah Fant	TE	Iowa	from Pittsburgh (Note: No. 20: Pittsburgh → Denver (D). See Round 1: Denver → Pittsburgh.)
1	21	Green Bay Packers	Darnell Savage	FS	Maryland	from Seattle (Note: No. 21: Seattle → Green Bay (D). Seattle traded a first-round selection (21st overall) to Green Bay in exchange for a first-round selection and two fourth-round selections (30th, 114th and 118th overall).)
1	22	Philadelphia Eagles	Andre Dillard	T	Washington State	from Baltimore (Note: No. 22: Baltimore → Philadelphia (D). Baltimore traded a first-round selection (22nd overall) to Philadelphia in exchange for first-, fourth- and sixth-round selections (25th, 127th and 197th overall).)
1	23	Houston Texans	Tytus Howard	T	Alabama State	
1	24	Oakland Raiders	Josh Jacobs ^{†}	RB	Alabama	from Chicago (Note: No. 24: Chicago → Oakland (PD). Chicago traded first- and sixth-round selections (24th and 196th overall), and 2020 first- and third-round selections to Oakland in exchange for 2020 second- and conditional fifth-round selections, and LB Khalil Mack.)
1	25	Baltimore Ravens	Marquise Brown	WR	Oklahoma	from Philadelphia (Note: No. 25: Philadelphia → Baltimore (D). See Round 1: Baltimore → Philadelphia.)
1	26	Washington Redskins	Montez Sweat ^{†}	DE	Mississippi State	from Indianapolis (Note: No. 26: Indianapolis → Washington (D). Indianapolis traded a first-round selection (26th overall) to Washington in exchange for a second-round selection (46th overall), and a 2020 second-round selection.)
1	27	Oakland Raiders	Johnathan Abram	S	Mississippi State	from Dallas (Note: No. 27: Dallas → Oakland (PD). Dallas traded a first-round selection (27th overall) to Oakland in exchange for WR Amari Cooper.)
1	28	Los Angeles Chargers	Jerry Tillery	DT	Notre Dame	
1	29	Seattle Seahawks	L. J. Collier	DE	TCU	from Kansas City (Note: No. 29: Kansas City → Seattle (PD). Kansas City traded first- and third-round selections (29th and 92nd overall), and a conditional 2020 second-round selection to Seattle in exchange for a third-round selection (84th overall) and DE Frank Clark.)
1	30	New York Giants	Deandre Baker	CB	Georgia	from New Orleans via Green Bay and Seattle (Note: No. 30: New Orleans → Green Bay → Seattle → NY Giants. Multiple trades: New Orleans → Green Bay (PD). New Orleans traded a first-round selection (30th overall), and 2018 first- and fifth-round selections to Green Bay in exchange for a 2018 first-round selection. Green Bay → Seattle (D). See Round 1: Seattle → Green Bay. Seattle → NY Giants (D). Seattle traded a first-round selection (30th overall) to the NY Giants in exchange for second-, fourth- and fifth-round selections (37th, 132nd and 142nd overall).); 2018 Thorpe Award winner
1	31	Atlanta Falcons	Kaleb McGary	T	Washington	from LA Rams (Note: No. 31: LA Rams → Atlanta (D). The LA Rams traded first- and sixth-round selections (31st and 203rd overall) to Atlanta in exchange for second- and third-round selections (45th and 79th overall).)
1	32	New England Patriots	N'Keal Harry	WR	Arizona State	
2	33	Arizona Cardinals	Byron Murphy ^{†}	CB	Washington	
2	34	Indianapolis Colts	Rock Ya-Sin	CB	Temple	from NY Jets (Note: No. 34: NY Jets → Indianapolis (PD). The NY Jets traded a second-round selection (34th overall), a 2018 first-round selection and two 2018 second-round selections to Indianapolis in exchange for a 2018 first-round selection.)
2	35	Jacksonville Jaguars	Jawaan Taylor	T	Florida	from Oakland (Note: No. 35: Oakland → Jacksonville (D). Oakland traded second-, fifth- and seventh-round selections (35th, 140th and 235th overall) to Jacksonville in exchange for second- and fourth-round selections (38th and 109th overall).)
2	36	San Francisco 49ers	Deebo Samuel ^{†}	WR	South Carolina	
2	37	Carolina Panthers	Greg Little	T	Ole Miss	from NY Giants via Seattle (Note: No. 37: NY Giants → Seattle → Carolina. Multiple trades: NY Giants → Seattle (D). See Round 1: Seattle → NY Giants. Seattle → Carolina (D). Seattle traded a second-round selection (37th overall) to Carolina in exchange for second- and third-round selections (47th and 77th overall).)
2	38	Buffalo Bills	Cody Ford	T	Oklahoma	from Jacksonville via Oakland (Note: No. 38: Jacksonville → Oakland → Buffalo. Multiple trades: Jacksonville → Oakland (D). See Round 2: Oakland → Jacksonville. Oakland → Buffalo (D). Oakland traded a second-round selection (38th overall) to Buffalo in exchange for second- and fifth-round selections (40th and 158th overall).)
2	39	Tampa Bay Buccaneers	Sean Murphy-Bunting	CB	Central Michigan	
2	40	Oakland Raiders	Trayvon Mullen	CB	Clemson	from Buffalo (Note: No. 40: Buffalo → Oakland (D). See Round 2: Oakland → Buffalo.)
2	41	Denver Broncos	Dalton Risner	T	Kansas State	
2	42	Denver Broncos	Drew Lock	QB	Missouri	from Cincinnati (Note: No. 42: Cincinnati → Denver (D). Cincinnati traded a second-round selection (42nd overall) to Denver in exchange for second-, fourth- and sixth-round selections (52nd, 125th and 182nd overall).)
2	43	Detroit Lions	Jahlani Tavai	LB	Hawaii	
2	44	Green Bay Packers	Elgton Jenkins ^{†}	C	Mississippi State	
2	45	New England Patriots	Joejuan Williams	CB	Vanderbilt	from Atlanta via LA Rams (Note: No. 45: Atlanta → LA Rams → New England. Multiple trades: Atlanta → LA Rams (D). See Round 1: LA Rams → Atlanta. LA Rams → New England (D). The LA Rams traded a second-round selection (45th overall) to New England in exchange for second- and third-round selections (56th and 101st overall).)
2	46	Cleveland Browns	Greedy Williams	CB	LSU	from Washington via Indianapolis (Note: No. 46: Washington → Indianapolis → Cleveland. Multiple trades: Washington → Indianapolis (D). See Round 1: Indianapolis → Washington. Indianapolis → Cleveland (D). Indianapolis traded a second-round selection (46th overall) to Cleveland in exchange for second- and fifth-round selections (49th and 144th overall).)
2	47	Seattle Seahawks	Marquise Blair	S	Utah	from Carolina (Note: No. 47: Carolina → Seattle (D). See Round 2: Seattle → Carolina.)
2	48	New Orleans Saints	Erik McCoy ^{†}	C	Texas A&M	from Miami (Note: No. 48: Miami → New Orleans (D). Miami traded a second- and fourth-round selection (48th and 116th overall) to New Orleans in exchange for second- and sixth-round selections (62nd and 202nd overall), and a 2020 second-round selection.)
2	49	Indianapolis Colts	Ben Banogu	LB	TCU	from Cleveland (Note: No. 49: Cleveland → Indianapolis (D). See Round 2: Indianapolis → Cleveland.)
2	50	Minnesota Vikings	Irv Smith Jr.	TE	Alabama	
2	51	Tennessee Titans	A. J. Brown ^{†}	WR	Ole Miss	
2	52	Cincinnati Bengals	Drew Sample	TE	Washington	from Pittsburgh via Denver (Note: No. 52: Pittsburgh → Denver → Cincinnati. Multiple trades: Pittsburgh → Denver (D). See Round 1: Denver → Pittsburgh. Denver → Cincinnati (D). See Round 2: Cincinnati → Denver.)
2	53	Philadelphia Eagles	Miles Sanders ^{†}	RB	Penn State	from Baltimore (Note: No. 53: Baltimore → Philadelphia (PD). Baltimore traded a second-round selection (53rd overall), and 2018 second- and fourth-round selections to Philadelphia in exchange for 2018 first- and fourth-round selections.)
2	54	Houston Texans	Lonnie Johnson Jr.	CB	Kentucky	from Seattle (Note: No. 54: Seattle → Houston (PD). Seattle traded a second-round selection (54th overall) and a 2018 third-round selection to Houston in exchange for a 2018 fifth-round selection and OT Duane Brown. This trade originally included CB Jeremy Lane but was revised after Lane failed his physical.)
2	55	Houston Texans	Max Scharping	T	Northern Illinois	
2	56	Kansas City Chiefs	Mecole Hardman ^{†}	WR	Georgia	from Chicago via New England and LA Rams (Note: No. 56: Chicago → New England → LA Rams → Kansas City. Multiple trades: Chicago → New England (PD). Chicago traded a second-round selection (56th overall) and a 2018 fourth-round selection to New England in exchange for a 2018 second-round selection. New England → LA Rams (D). See Round 2: LA Rams → New England. LA Rams → Kansas City (D). The LA Rams traded a second-round selection (56th overall) to Kansas City in exchange for second- and fifth-round selections (61st and 167th overall).)
2	57	Philadelphia Eagles	J. J. Arcega-Whiteside	WR	Stanford	
2	58	Dallas Cowboys	Trysten Hill	DT	UCF	
2	59	Indianapolis Colts	Parris Campbell	WR	Ohio State	
2	60	Los Angeles Chargers	Nasir Adderley	S	Delaware	
2	61	Los Angeles Rams	Taylor Rapp	S	Washington	from Kansas City (Note: No. 61: Kansas City → LA Rams (D). See Round 2: LA Rams → Kansas City.)
2	62	Arizona Cardinals	Andy Isabella	WR	UMass	from New Orleans via Miami (Note: No. 62: New Orleans → Miami → Arizona. Multiple trades: New Orleans → Miami (D). See Round 2: Miami → New Orleans. Miami → Arizona (D). Miami traded a second-round selection (62nd overall) and a 2020 fifth-round selection to Arizona in exchange for QB Josh Rosen.)
2	63	Kansas City Chiefs	Juan Thornhill	S	Virginia	from LA Rams (Note: No. 63: LA Rams → Kansas City (PD). The LA Rams traded a second-round selection (63rd overall) and a 2018 fourth-round selection to Kansas City in exchange for a 2018 sixth-round selection and CB Marcus Peters.)
2	64	Seattle Seahawks	DK Metcalf ^{†}	WR	Ole Miss	from New England (Note: No. 64: New England → Seattle (D). New England traded a second-round selection (64th overall) to Seattle in exchange for third- and fourth-round selections (77th and 118th overall).)
3	65	Arizona Cardinals	Zach Allen ^{†}	DE	Boston College	
3	66	Pittsburgh Steelers	Diontae Johnson ^{†}	WR	Toledo	from Oakland (Note: No. 66: Oakland → Pittsburgh (PD). Oakland traded third- and fifth-round selections (66th and 141st overall) to Pittsburgh in exchange for WR Antonio Brown.)
3	67	San Francisco 49ers	Jalen Hurd	WR	Baylor	
3	68	New York Jets	Jachai Polite	LB	Florida	
3	69	Jacksonville Jaguars	Josh Oliver	TE	San Jose State	
3	70	Los Angeles Rams	Darrell Henderson	RB	Memphis	from Tampa Bay (Note: No. 70: Tampa Bay → LA Rams (D). Tampa Bay traded a third-round selection (70th overall) to the LA Rams in exchange for two third-round selections (94th and 99th overall).)
3	–	New York Giants	Selection forfeited during the 2018 supplemental draft. (Note: The NY Giants forfeited a third-round selection after selecting CB Sam Beal in the 2018 supplemental draft.)			
3	71	Denver Broncos	Dre'Mont Jones	DT	Ohio State	
3	72	Cincinnati Bengals	Germaine Pratt	LB	NC State	
3	73	Chicago Bears	David Montgomery	RB	Iowa State	from Detroit via New England (Note: No. 73: Detroit → New England → Chicago. Multiple trades: Detroit → New England (PD). Detroit traded a third-round selection (73rd overall) to New England in exchange for a 2018 fourth-round selection. New England → Chicago (D). New England traded third- and sixth-round selections (73rd and 205th overall) to Chicago in exchange for third- and fifth-round selections (87th and 162nd overall), and a 2020 fourth-round selection.)
3	74	Buffalo Bills	Devin Singletary	RB	Florida Atlantic	
3	75	Green Bay Packers	Jace Sternberger	TE	Texas A&M	
3	76	Washington Redskins	Terry McLaurin ^{†}	WR	Ohio State	
3	77	New England Patriots	Chase Winovich	DE	Michigan	from Carolina via Seattle (Note: No. 77: Carolina → Seattle → New England. Multiple trades: Carolina → Seattle (D). See Round 2: Seattle → Carolina. Seattle → New England (D). See Round 2: New England → Seattle.)
3	78	Miami Dolphins	Michael Deiter	G	Wisconsin	
3	79	Los Angeles Rams	David Long	CB	Michigan	from Atlanta (Note: No. 79: Atlanta → LA Rams (D). See Round 1: LA Rams → Atlanta.)
3	80	Cleveland Browns	Sione Takitaki	LB	BYU	
3	81	Detroit Lions	Will Harris	S	Boston College	from Minnesota (Note: No. 81: Minnesota → Detroit (D). Minnesota traded a third-round selection (81st overall) to Detroit in exchange for third- and sixth-round selections (88th and 204th overall).)
3	82	Tennessee Titans	Nate Davis	G	Charlotte	
3	83	Pittsburgh Steelers	Justin Layne	CB	Michigan State	
3	84	Kansas City Chiefs	Khalen Saunders	DT	Western Illinois	from Seattle (Note: No. 84: Seattle → Kansas City (PD). See Round 1: Kansas City → Seattle.)
3	85	Baltimore Ravens	Jaylon Ferguson	DE	Louisiana Tech	
3	86	Houston Texans	Kahale Warring	TE	San Diego State	
3	87	New England Patriots	Damien Harris	RB	Alabama	from Chicago (Note: No. 87: Chicago → New England (D). See Round 3: New England → Chicago.)
3	88	Seattle Seahawks	Cody Barton	LB	Utah	from Philadelphia via Detroit and Minnesota (Note: No. 88: Philadelphia → Detroit → Minnesota → Seattle. Multiple trades: Philadelphia → Detroit (PD). Philadelphia traded a third-round selection (88th overall) to Detroit in exchange for WR Golden Tate. Detroit → Minnesota (D). See Round 3: Minnesota → Detroit. Minnesota → Seattle (D). Minnesota traded third- and sixth-round selections (88th and 209th overall) to Seattle in exchange for third- and fifth-round selections (92nd and 159th overall).)
3	89	Indianapolis Colts	Bobby Okereke	LB	Stanford	
3	90	Dallas Cowboys	Connor McGovern ^{†}	G	Penn State	
3	91	Los Angeles Chargers	Trey Pipkins	T	Sioux Falls	
3	92	New York Jets	Chuma Edoga	T	USC	from Kansas City via Seattle and Minnesota (Note: No. 92: Kansas City → Seattle → Minnesota → NY Jets. Multiple trades: Kansas City → Seattle (PD). See Round 1: Kansas City → Seattle. Seattle → Minnesota (D). See Round 3: Minnesota → Seattle. Minnesota → NY Jets (D). Minnesota traded a third-round selection (92nd overall) to the NY Jets in exchange for third- and seventh-round selections (93rd and 217th overall).)
3	93	Baltimore Ravens	Miles Boykin	WR	Notre Dame	from New Orleans via NY Jets and Minnesota (Note: No. 93: New Orleans → NY Jets → Minnesota → Baltimore. Multiple trades: New Orleans → NY Jets (PD). New Orleans traded a third-round selection (93rd overall) to the NY Jets for a sixth-round selection and QB Teddy Bridgewater. NY Jets → Minnesota (D). See Round 3: Minnesota → NY Jets. Minnesota → Baltimore (D). Minnesota traded a third-round selection (93rd overall) to Baltimore in exchange for a third-round selection and two sixth-round selections (102nd, 191st and 193rd overall).)
3	94	Tampa Bay Buccaneers	Jamel Dean	CB	Auburn	from LA Rams (Note: No. 94: LA Rams → Tampa Bay (D). See Round 3: Tampa Bay → LA Rams.)
3	95	New York Giants	Oshane Ximines	DE	Old Dominion	from New England via Cleveland (Note: No. 95: New England → Cleveland → NY Giants. Multiple trades: New England → Cleveland (PD). New England traded a third-round selection (95th overall) to Cleveland in exchange for a 2018 fifth-round selection and DT Danny Shelton. Cleveland → NY Giants (PD). See Round 1: Cleveland → NY Giants.)
3*	96	Buffalo Bills	Dawson Knox ^{†}	TE	Ole Miss	from Washington (Note: No. 96: Washington → Buffalo (D). Washington traded a third-round selection (96th overall) to Buffalo in exchange for two fourth-round selections (112th and 131st overall).)
3*	97	Los Angeles Rams	Bobby Evans	T	Oklahoma	from New England (Note: No. 97: New England → LA Rams (D). New England traded third- and fifth-round selections (97th and 162nd overall) to the LA Rams in exchange for third- and fourth-round selections (101st and 133rd overall).)
3*	98	Jacksonville Jaguars	Quincy Williams	LB	Murray State	from LA Rams (Note: No. 98: LA Rams → Jacksonville (PD). The LA Rams traded a third-round selection (98th overall) and a 2020 fifth-round selection to Jacksonville in exchange for DE Dante Fowler.)
3*	99	Tampa Bay Buccaneers	Mike Edwards	S	Kentucky	from LA Rams (Note: No. 99: LA Rams → Tampa Bay (D). See Round 3: Tampa Bay → LA Rams.)
3*	100	Carolina Panthers	Will Grier	QB	West Virginia	
3*	101	New England Patriots	Yodny Cajuste	T	West Virginia	from New England via LA Rams (Note: No. 101: New England → LA Rams → New England. Multiple trades: New England → LA Rams (D). See Round 2: LA Rams → New England. LA Rams → New England (D). See Round 3: New England → LA Rams.)
3*	102	Minnesota Vikings	Alexander Mattison	RB	Boise State	from Baltimore (Note: No. 102: Baltimore → Minnesota (D). See Round 3: Minnesota → Baltimore.)
4	103	Arizona Cardinals	Hakeem Butler	WR	Iowa State	
4	104	Cincinnati Bengals	Ryan Finley	QB	NC State	from San Francisco (Note: No. 104: San Francisco → Cincinnati (D). San Francisco traded a fourth-round selection (104th overall) to Cincinnati in exchange for the Bengals' fourth- and two sixth-round selections (110th, 183rd, 198th overall).)
4	105	New Orleans Saints	C. J. Gardner-Johnson	S	Florida	from NY Jets (Note: No. 105: NY Jets → New Orleans (D). The NY Jets traded a fourth-round selection (105th overall) to New Orleans in exchange for the Saints' fourth- and fifth-round selections (116th and 168th overall).)
4	106	Oakland Raiders	Maxx Crosby ^{†}	DE	Eastern Michigan	
4	107	Tampa Bay Buccaneers	Anthony Nelson	DE	Iowa	
4	108	New York Giants	Julian Love ^{†}	CB	Notre Dame	
4	109	Indianapolis Colts	Khari Willis	S	Michigan State	from Jacksonville via Oakland (Note: No. 109: Jacksonville → Oakland → Indianapolis. Multiple trades: No. 109: Jacksonville → Oakland (D). See Round 2: Oakland → Jacksonville. Oakland → Indianapolis (D). Oakland traded a fourth-round selection (109th overall) to Indianapolis in exchange for two fourth-round selections (129th and 135th overall).)
4	110	San Francisco 49ers	Mitch Wishnowsky	P	Utah	from Cincinnati (Note: No. 110: Cincinnati → San Francisco (D). See Round 4: San Francisco → Cincinnati.); 2016 Ray Guy Award winner
4	111	Atlanta Falcons	Kendall Sheffield	CB	Ohio State	from Detroit (Note: No. 111: Detroit → Atlanta (D). Detroit traded a fourth-round selection (111th overall) to Atlanta in exchange for fourth- and sixth-round selections (117th and 186th overall).)
4	112	Washington Redskins	Bryce Love	RB	Stanford	from Buffalo (Note: No. 112: Buffalo → Washington (D). See Round 3: Washington → Buffalo.); 2017 Doak Walker Award winner
4	113	Baltimore Ravens	Justice Hill	RB	Oklahoma State	from Denver (Note: No. 113: Denver → Baltimore (PD). Denver traded a fourth-round selection (113th overall) to Baltimore in exchange for QB Joe Flacco.)
4	114	Minnesota Vikings	Dru Samia	G	Oklahoma	from Green Bay via Seattle (Note: No. 114: Green Bay → Seattle → Minnesota. Multiple trades: Green Bay → Seattle (D). See Round 1: Seattle → Green Bay. Seattle → Minnesota (D). Seattle traded a fourth-round selection (114th overall) to Minnesota in exchange for fourth- and sixth-round selections (120th and 204th overall).)
4	115	Carolina Panthers	Christian Miller	LB	Alabama	
4	116	Tennessee Titans	Amani Hooker	S	Iowa	from Miami via New Orleans and NY Jets (Note: No. 116: Miami → New Orleans → NY Jets → Tennessee. Multiple trades: Miami → New Orleans (D). See Round 2: Miami → New Orleans. New Orleans → NY Jets (D). See Round 4: NY Jets → New Orleans. NY Jets → Tennessee (D). The NY Jets traded fourth- and fifth-round selections (116th and 168th overall) to Tennessee in exchange for fourth- and fifth-round selections (121st and 157th overall).)
4	117	Detroit Lions	Austin Bryant	DE	Clemson	from Atlanta (Note: No. 117: Atlanta → Detroit (D). See Round 4: Detroit → Atlanta.)
4	118	New England Patriots	Hjalte Froholdt	G	Arkansas	from Washington via Green Bay and Seattle (Note: No. 118: Washington → Green Bay → Seattle → New England. Multiple trades: Washington → Green Bay (PD). Washington traded a fourth-round selection (118th overall) to Green Bay in exchange for S Ha Ha Clinton-Dix. Green Bay → Seattle (D). See Round 1: Seattle → Green Bay. Seattle → New England (D). See Round 2: New England → Seattle.)
4	119	Cleveland Browns	Sheldrick Redwine	S	Miami (FL)	
4	120	Seattle Seahawks	Gary Jennings Jr.	WR	West Virginia	from Minnesota (Note: No. 120: Minnesota → Seattle (D). See Round 4: Seattle → Minnesota.)
4	121	New York Jets	Trevon Wesco	TE	West Virginia	from Tennessee (Note: No. 121: Tennessee → NY Jets (D). See Round 4: NY Jets → Tennessee.)
4	122	Pittsburgh Steelers	Benny Snell	RB	Kentucky	
4	123	Baltimore Ravens	Ben Powers	G	Oklahoma	
4	124	Seattle Seahawks	Phil Haynes	G	Wake Forest	
4	125	Cincinnati Bengals	Renell Wren	DT	Arizona State	from Houston via Denver (Note: No. 125: Houston → Denver → Cincinnati. Multiple trades: Houston → Denver (PD). Houston traded fourth- and seventh-round selections (125th and 237th overall) to Denver in exchange for a seventh-round selection (220th overall) and WR Demaryius Thomas. Denver → Cincinnati (D). See Round 2: Cincinnati → Denver.)
4	126	Chicago Bears	Riley Ridley	WR	Georgia	
4	127	Baltimore Ravens	Iman Marshall	CB	USC	from Philadelphia (Note: No. 127: Philadelphia → Baltimore (D). See Round 1: Baltimore → Philadelphia.)
4	128	Dallas Cowboys	Tony Pollard ^{†}	RB	Memphis	
4	129	Oakland Raiders	Isaiah Johnson	CB	Houston	from Indianapolis (Note: No. 129: Indianapolis → Oakland (D). See Round 4: Oakland → Indianapolis.)
4	130	Los Angeles Chargers	Drue Tranquill	LB	Notre Dame	
4	131	Washington Redskins	Wes Martin	G	Indiana	from Kansas City via Buffalo (Note: No. 131: Kansas City → Buffalo → Washington. Multiple trades: Kansas City → Buffalo (PD). Kansas City traded a conditional fourth-round selection (131st overall) to Buffalo in exchange for LB Reggie Ragland. Buffalo → Washington (D). See Round 3: Washington → Buffalo.)
4	132	Seattle Seahawks	Ugo Amadi	S	Oregon	from New Orleans via NY Giants (Note: No. 132: New Orleans → NY Giants → Seattle. Multiple trades: New Orleans → NY Giants (PD). New Orleans traded a fourth-round selection (132nd overall) and a 2020 seventh-round selection to the NY Giants in exchange for CB Eli Apple. NY Giants → Seattle (D). See Round 1: Seattle → NY Giants.)
4	133	New England Patriots	Jarrett Stidham	QB	Auburn	from LA Rams (Note: No. 133: LA Rams → New England (D). See Round 3: New England → LA Rams.)
4	134	Los Angeles Rams	Greg Gaines	DT	Washington	from New England (Note: No. 134: New England → LA Rams (D). New England traded fourth- and seventh-round selections (134th and 243rd overall) to the LA Rams in exchange for two fifth-round selections (162nd and 167th overall).)
4*	135	Atlanta Falcons	John Cominsky	DE	Charleston	from Indianapolis via Oakland (Note: No. 135: Indianapolis → Oakland → Atlanta. Multiple trades: Indianapolis → Oakland (D). See Round 4: Oakland → Indianapolis. Oakland → Atlanta (D). Oakland traded a fourth-round selection (135th overall) to Atlanta in exchange for fourth- and seventh-round selections (137th and 230th overall).)
4*	136	Cincinnati Bengals	Michael Jordan	G	Ohio State	from Dallas (Note: No. 136: Dallas → Cincinnati (D). Dallas traded a fourth-round selection (136th overall) to Cincinnati in exchange for fifth- and sixth-round selections (149th and 213th overall).)
4*	137	Oakland Raiders	Foster Moreau	TE	LSU	from Atlanta (Note: No. 137: Atlanta → Oakland (D). See Round 4: Oakland → Atlanta.)
4*	138	Philadelphia Eagles	Shareef Miller	DE	Penn State	
5	139	Arizona Cardinals	Deionte Thompson	S	Alabama	
5	140	Jacksonville Jaguars	Ryquell Armstead	RB	Temple	from NY Jets via Oakland (Note: No. 140: NY Jets → Oakland → Jacksonville. Multiple trades: NY Jets → Oakland (PD). The NY Jets traded a fifth-round selection (140th overall) to Oakland in exchange for G Kelechi Osemele and a sixth-round selection (196th overall) originally acquired from Chicago. Oakland → Jacksonville (D). See Round 2: Oakland → Jacksonville.)
5	141	Pittsburgh Steelers	Zach Gentry	TE	Michigan	from Oakland (Note: No. 141: Oakland → Pittsburgh (PD). See Round 3: Oakland → Pittsburgh.)
5	142	Seattle Seahawks	Ben Burr-Kirven	LB	Washington	from San Francisco via Detroit and NY Giants (Note: No. 142: San Francisco → Detroit → NY Giants → Seattle. Multiple trades: San Francisco → Detroit (PD). San Francisco traded a fifth-round selection (142nd overall) to Detroit in exchange for G Laken Tomlinson. Detroit → NY Giants (PD). Detroit traded a fifth-round selection (142nd overall) to the NY Giants in exchange for DT Damon Harrison. The Giants received the earlier of either Detroit's original selection or the one Detroit received from San Francisco. NY Giants → Seattle (D). See Round 1: Seattle → NY Giants.)
5	143	New York Giants	Ryan Connelly	LB	Wisconsin	
5	144	Indianapolis Colts	Marvell Tell	S	USC	from Jacksonville via Cleveland (Note: No. 144: Jacksonville → Cleveland → Indianapolis. Multiple trades: Jacksonville → Cleveland (PD). Jacksonville traded a fifth-round selection (144th overall) to Cleveland in exchange for RB Carlos Hyde. Cleveland → Indianapolis (D). See Round 2: Indianapolis → Cleveland.)
5	145	Tampa Bay Buccaneers	Matt Gay ^{†}	K	Utah	2017 Lou Groza Award winner
5	146	Detroit Lions	Amani Oruwariye	CB	Penn State	
5	147	Buffalo Bills	Vosean Joseph	LB	Florida	
5	148	San Francisco 49ers	Dre Greenlaw	LB	Arkansas	from Denver (Note: No. 148: Denver → San Francisco (D). Denver traded a fifth-round selection (148th overall) to San Francisco in exchange for LB Dekoda Watson and a sixth-round selection (212th overall).)
5	149	Oakland Raiders	Hunter Renfrow ^{†}	WR	Clemson	from Cincinnati via Dallas (Note: No. 149: Cincinnati → Dallas → Oakland. Multiple trades: Cincinnati → Dallas (D). See Round 4: Dallas → Cincinnati. Dallas → Oakland (D). Dallas traded a fifth-round selection (149th overall) to Oakland in exchange for fifth- and seventh-round selections (158th and 218th overall).); 2018 Burlsworth Trophy winner
5	150	Green Bay Packers	Kingsley Keke	DT	Texas A&M	
5	151	Miami Dolphins	Andrew Van Ginkel ^{†}	LB	Wisconsin	
5	152	Atlanta Falcons	Qadree Ollison	RB	Pittsburgh	
5	153	Washington Redskins	Ross Pierschbacher	G	Alabama	
5	154	Carolina Panthers	Jordan Scarlett	RB	Florida	
5	155	Cleveland Browns	Mack Wilson	LB	Alabama	
5	156	Denver Broncos	Justin Hollins	LB	Oregon	from Minnesota (Note: No. 156: Minnesota → Denver (PD). Minnesota traded a fifth-round selection (156th overall) to Denver in exchange for 2018 seventh-round selection and QB Trevor Siemian.)
5	157	New York Jets	Blake Cashman	LB	Minnesota	from Tennessee (Note: No. 157: Tennessee → NY Jets (D). See Round 4: NY Jets → Tennessee.)
5	158	Dallas Cowboys	Michael Jackson	CB	Miami (FL)	from Pittsburgh via Oakland, Buffalo and Oakland (Note: No. 158: Pittsburgh → Oakland → Buffalo → Oakland → Dallas. Multiple trades: Pittsburgh → Oakland (PD). Pittsburgh traded a fifth-round selection (158th overall) to Oakland in exchange for a sixth-round selection (175th overall) and WR Ryan Switzer. Oakland → Buffalo (PD). Oakland traded a fifth-round selection (158th overall) to Buffalo in exchange for QB A. J. McCarron. Buffalo → Oakland (D). See Round 2: Oakland → Buffalo. Oakland → Dallas (D). See Round 5: Dallas → Oakland.)
5	159	New England Patriots	Byron Cowart	DT	Maryland	from Seattle via Minnesota (Note: No. 159: Seattle → Minnesota → New England. Multiple trades: Seattle → Minnesota (D). See Round 3: Minnesota → Seattle. Minnesota → New England (D). Minnesota traded a fifth-round selection (159th overall) to New England in exchange for fifth- and seventh-round selections (162nd and 239th overall).)
5	160	Baltimore Ravens	Daylon Mack	DT	Texas A&M	
5	161	Houston Texans	Charles Omenihu	DE	Texas	
5	162	Minnesota Vikings	Cameron Smith	LB	USC	from Chicago via New England, LA Rams and New England (Note: No. 162: Chicago → New England → LA Rams → New England → Minnesota. Multiple trades: Chicago → New England (D). See Round 3: New England → Chicago. New England → LA Rams (D). See Round 3: New England → LA Rams. LA Rams → New England (D). See Round 4: New England → LA Rams. New England → Minnesota (D). See Round 5: Minnesota → New England.)
5	163	New England Patriots	Jake Bailey ^{†}	P	Stanford	from Philadelphia (Note: No. 163: Philadelphia → New England (D). Philadelphia traded a fifth-round selection (163rd overall) to New England in exchange for fifth- and seventh-round selections (167th and 246th overall).)
5	164	Indianapolis Colts	E. J. Speed	LB	Tarleton State	
5	165	Dallas Cowboys	Joe Jackson	DE	Miami (FL)	
5	166	Los Angeles Chargers	Easton Stick	QB	North Dakota State	
5	167	Philadelphia Eagles	Clayton Thorson	QB	Northwestern	from Kansas City via LA Rams and New England (Note: No. 167: Kansas City → LA Rams → New England → Philadelphia. Multiple trades: Kansas City → LA Rams (D). See Round 2: LA Rams → Kansas City. LA Rams → New England (D). See Round 4: New England → LA Rams. New England → Philadelphia (D). See Round 5: Philadelphia → New England.)
5	168	Tennessee Titans	D'Andre Walker	LB	Georgia	from New Orleans via NY Jets (Note: No. 168: New Orleans → NY Jets → Tennessee. Multiple trades: New Orleans → NY Jets (D). See Round 4: NY Jets → New Orleans. NY Jets → Tennessee (D). See Round 4: Tennessee → NY Jets.)
5	169	Los Angeles Rams	David Edwards	T	Wisconsin	
5	170	Cleveland Browns	Austin Seibert	K	Oklahoma	from New England (Note: No. 170: New England → Cleveland (PD). New England traded a fifth-round selection (170th overall) to Cleveland in exchange for receiver Josh Gordon and a seventh-round selection (243rd overall).)
5*	171	New York Giants	Darius Slayton	WR	Auburn	
5*	172	Atlanta Falcons	Jordan Miller	CB	Washington	
5*	173	Washington Redskins	Cole Holcomb	LB	North Carolina	
6	174	Arizona Cardinals	KeeSean Johnson	WR	Fresno State	
6	175	Pittsburgh Steelers	Sutton Smith	DE	Northern Illinois	from Oakland (Note: No. 175: Oakland → Pittsburgh (PD). See Round 5: Pittsburgh → Oakland.)
6	176	San Francisco 49ers	Kaden Smith	TE	Stanford	
6	177	New Orleans Saints	Saquan Hampton	S	Rutgers	from NY Jets (Note: No. 177: NY Jets → New Orleans (PD). See Round 3: New Orleans → NY Jets.)
6	178	Jacksonville Jaguars	Gardner Minshew ^{†}	QB	Washington State	
6	179	Arizona Cardinals	Lamont Gaillard	C	Georgia	from Tampa Bay (Note: No. 179: Tampa Bay → Arizona (PD). Tampa Bay traded a sixth-round selection (179th overall) to Arizona in exchange for a seventh-round selection (215th overall) and the rights to head coach Bruce Arians.)
6	180	New York Giants	Corey Ballentine	CB	Washburn	
6	181	Buffalo Bills	Jaquan Johnson	CB	Miami (FL)	
6	182	Cincinnati Bengals	Trayveon Williams	RB	Texas A&M	from Denver (Note: No. 182: Denver → Cincinnati (D). See Round 2: Cincinnati → Denver.)
6	183	San Francisco 49ers	Justin Skule	T	Vanderbilt	from Cincinnati (Note: No. 183: Cincinnati → San Francisco (D). See Round 4: San Francisco → Cincinnati.)
6	184	Detroit Lions	Travis Fulgham	WR	Old Dominion	
6	185	Green Bay Packers	Ka'dar Hollman	CB	Toledo	
6	186	Detroit Lions	Ty Johnson	RB	Maryland	from Atlanta (Note: No. 186: Atlanta → Detroit (D). See Round 4: Detroit → Atlanta.)
6	–	Washington Redskins	Selection forfeited during the 2018 supplemental draft. (Note: Washington forfeited a 2019 sixth-round selection after selecting CB Adonis Alexander in the 2018 supplemental draft.)			
6	187	Denver Broncos	Juwann Winfree	WR	Colorado	from Carolina (Note: No. 187: Carolina → Denver (D). Carolina traded a sixth-round selection (187th overall) to Denver in exchange for sixth- and seventh-round selections (212th and 237th overall).)
6	188	Tennessee Titans	David Long Jr.	LB	West Virginia	from Miami (Note: No. 188: Miami → Tennessee (PD). Miami traded a sixth-round selection (188th overall) and QB Ryan Tannehill to Tennessee in exchange for a seventh-round selection (233rd overall) and a 2020 fourth-round selection.)
6	189	Cleveland Browns	Drew Forbes	T	Southeast Missouri State	
6	190	Minnesota Vikings	Armon Watts	DT	Arkansas	
6	191	Minnesota Vikings	Marcus Epps	S	Wyoming	from Tennessee via Baltimore (Note: No. 191: Tennessee → Baltimore → Minnesota. Multiple trades: Tennessee → Baltimore (PD). Tennessee traded a sixth-round selection (191st overall) to Baltimore in exchange for LB Kamalei Correa. Baltimore → Minnesota (D). See Round 3: Minnesota → Baltimore.)
6	192	Pittsburgh Steelers	Isaiah Buggs	DT	Alabama	
6	193	Minnesota Vikings	Oli Udoh	T	Elon	from Baltimore (Note: No. 193: Baltimore → Minnesota (D). See Round 3: Minnesota → Baltimore.)
6	194	Green Bay Packers	Dexter Williams	RB	Notre Dame	from Seattle (Note: No. 194: Seattle → Green Bay (PD). Seattle traded a sixth-round selection (194th overall) to Green Bay in exchange for QB Brett Hundley.)
6	195	Houston Texans	Xavier Crawford	CB	Central Michigan	
6	196	New York Jets	Blessuan Austin	CB	Rutgers	from Chicago via Oakland (Note: No. 196: Chicago → Oakland → NY Jets. Multiple trades: Chicago → Oakland (PD). See Round 1: Chicago → Oakland. Oakland → NY Jets (PD). See Round 5: Oakland → NY Jets.)
6	197	Baltimore Ravens	Trace McSorley	QB	Penn State	from Philadelphia (Note: No. 197: Philadelphia → Baltimore (D). See Round 1: Baltimore → Philadelphia.)
6	198	San Francisco 49ers	Tim Harris	CB	Virginia	from Dallas via Cincinnati (Note: No. 198: Dallas → Cincinnati → San Francisco. Multiple trades: Dallas → Cincinnati (PD). Dallas traded a conditional sixth-round selection (198th overall) to Cincinnati in exchange for CB Bene Benwikere. Cincinnati → San Francisco (D). See Round 4: San Francisco → Cincinnati.)
6	199	Indianapolis Colts	Gerri Green	DE	Mississippi State	
6	200	Los Angeles Chargers	Emeke Egbule	LB	Houston	
6	201	Kansas City Chiefs	Rashad Fenton	CB	South Carolina	
6	202	Miami Dolphins	Isaiah Prince	T	Ohio State	from New Orleans (Note: No. 202: New Orleans → Miami (D). See Round 2: Miami → New Orleans.)
6	203	Atlanta Falcons	Marcus Green	WR	Louisiana–Monroe	from LA Rams (Note: No. 203: LA Rams → Atlanta (D). See Round 1: LA Rams → Atlanta.)
6	204	Seattle Seahawks	Travis Homer	RB	Miami (FL)	from New England via Detroit and Minnesota (Note: No. 204: New England → Detroit → Minnesota → Seattle. Multiple trades: New England → Detroit (PD). New England traded a sixth-round selection (204th overall) to Detroit in exchange for CB Johnson Bademosi. Detroit → Minnesota (D). See Round 3: Minnesota → Detroit. Minnesota → Seattle (D). See Round 4: Seattle → Minnesota.)
6*	205	Chicago Bears	Duke Shelley	CB	Kansas State	from New England (Note: No. 205: New England → Chicago (D). See Round 3: Chicago → New England.)
6*	206	Washington Redskins	Kelvin Harmon	WR	NC State	
6*	207	Pittsburgh Steelers	Ulysees Gilbert III	LB	Akron	from Arizona (Note: No. 207: Arizona → Pittsburgh (PD). Arizona traded a sixth-round selection (207th overall) to Pittsburgh in exchange for OT Marcus Gilbert.)
6*	208	Tampa Bay Buccaneers	Scotty Miller	WR	Bowling Green	from Philadelphia (Note: No. 208: Philadelphia → Tampa Bay (PD). Philadelphia traded a sixth-round selection (208th overall) to Tampa Bay in exchange for WR DeSean Jackson and a 2020 seventh-round selection.)
6*	209	Seattle Seahawks	Demarcus Christmas	DT	Florida State	from Minnesota (Note: No. 209: Minnesota → Seattle (D). See Round 3: Minnesota → Seattle.)
6*	210	Cincinnati Bengals	Deshaun Davis	LB	Auburn	
6*	211	Cincinnati Bengals	Rodney Anderson	RB	Oklahoma	
6*	212	Carolina Panthers	Dennis Daley	T	South Carolina	from San Francisco via Denver (Note: No. 212: San Francisco → Denver → Carolina. Multiple trades: San Francisco → Denver (D). See Round 5: Denver → San Francisco. Denver → Carolina (D). See Round 6: Carolina → Denver.)
6*	213	Dallas Cowboys	Donovan Wilson	S	Texas A&M	from Cincinnati (Note: No. 213: Cincinnati → Dallas (D). See Round 4: Dallas → Cincinnati.)
6*	214	Kansas City Chiefs	Darwin Thompson	RB	Utah State	
7	215	Tampa Bay Buccaneers	Terry Beckner	DT	Missouri	from Arizona (Note: No. 215: Arizona → Tampa Bay (PD). See Round 6: Tampa Bay → Arizona.)
7	216	Kansas City Chiefs	Nick Allegretti	G	Illinois	from San Francisco (Note: No. 216: San Francisco → Kansas City (PD). San Francisco traded a conditional seventh-round selection (216th overall) to Kansas City in exchange for WR Rod Streater and a conditional seventh-round selection.)
7	217	Minnesota Vikings	Kris Boyd	CB	Texas	from NY Jets (Note: No. 217: NY Jets → Minnesota (D). See Round 3: Minnesota → NY Jets.)
7	218	Dallas Cowboys	Mike Weber	RB	Ohio State	from Oakland (Note: No. 218: Oakland → Dallas (D). See Round 5: Dallas → Oakland.)
7	219	Pittsburgh Steelers	Derwin Gray	T	Maryland	from Tampa Bay (Note: No. 219: Tampa Bay → Pittsburgh (PD). Tampa Bay traded a seventh-round selection (219th overall) and S J. J. Wilcox to Pittsburgh in exchange for a 2018 sixth-round selection.)
7	220	Houston Texans	Cullen Gillaspia	FB	Texas A&M	from NY Giants via Denver (Note: No. 220: NY Giants → Denver → Houston. Multiple trades: NY Giants → Denver (PD). The NY Giants traded a conditional seventh-round selection (220th overall) to Denver in exchange for P Riley Dixon. Denver → Houston (PD). See Round 4: Houston → Denver.)
7	221	Cleveland Browns	Donnie Lewis	CB	Tulane	from Jacksonville (Note: No. 221: Jacksonville → Cleveland (PD). Jacksonville traded a conditional seventh-round selection (221st overall) to Cleveland in exchange for QB Cody Kessler.)
7	222	Chicago Bears	Kerrith Whyte	RB	Florida Atlantic	from Denver via Philadelphia (Note: No. 222: Denver → Philadelphia → Chicago. Multiple trades: Denver → Philadelphia (PD). Denver traded a seventh-round selection (222nd overall) to Philadelphia in exchange for G Allen Barbre. Philadelphia → Chicago (PD). Philadelphia traded a conditional seventh-round selection (222nd overall) to Chicago in exchange for S Deiondre' Hall.)
7	223	Cincinnati Bengals	Jordan Brown	CB	South Dakota State	
7	224	Detroit Lions	Isaac Nauta	TE	Georgia	
7	225	Buffalo Bills	Darryl Johnson	DE	North Carolina A&T	
7	226	Green Bay Packers	Ty Summers	LB	TCU	
7	227	Washington Redskins	Jimmy Moreland	CB	James Madison	
7	228	Buffalo Bills	Tommy Sweeney	TE	Boston College	from Carolina (Note: No. 228: Carolina → Buffalo (PD). Carolina traded a seventh-round selection (228th overall) and WR Kaelin Clay to Buffalo in exchange for CB Kevon Seymour.)
7	229	Detroit Lions	P. J. Johnson	DE	Arizona	from Miami (Note: No. 229: Miami → Detroit (PD). Miami traded a conditional seventh-round selection (229th overall) to Detroit in exchange for DT Akeem Spence.)
7	230	Oakland Raiders	Quinton Bell	DE	Prairie View A&M	from Atlanta (Note: No. 230: Atlanta → Oakland (D). See Round 4: Oakland → Atlanta.)
7	231	New Orleans Saints	Alizé Mack	TE	Notre Dame	from Cleveland (Note: No. 231: Cleveland → New Orleans (PD). Cleveland traded a conditional seventh-round selection (231st overall) to New Orleans in exchange for DT Devaroe Lawrence.)
7	232	New York Giants	George Asafo-Adjei	T	Kentucky	from Minnesota (Note: No. 232: Minnesota → NY Giants (PD). Minnesota traded a seventh-round selection (232nd overall) to the NY Giants in exchange for C Brett Jones.)
7	233	Miami Dolphins	Chandler Cox	FB	Auburn	from Tennessee (Note: No. 233: Tennessee → Miami (PD). See Round 6: Miami → Tennessee.)
7	234	Miami Dolphins	Myles Gaskin	RB	Washington	from Pittsburgh via Cleveland (Note: No. 234: Pittsburgh → Cleveland → Miami. Multiple trades: Pittsburgh → Cleveland (PD). Pittsburgh traded a seventh-round selection (234th overall) and WR Sammie Coates to Cleveland in exchange for a 2018 sixth-round selection. Cleveland → Miami (PD). Cleveland traded a seventh-round selection (234th overall) and a 2018 fourth-round selection to Miami in exchange for WR Jarvis Landry.)
7	235	Jacksonville Jaguars	Dontavius Russell	DT	Auburn	from Seattle via Oakland (Note: No. 235: Seattle → Oakland → Jacksonville. Multiple trades: Seattle → Oakland (PD). Seattle traded a seventh-round selection (235th overall) to Oakland in exchange for S Shalom Luani. Oakland → Jacksonville (D). See Round 2: Oakland → Jacksonville.)
7	236	Seattle Seahawks	John Ursua	WR	Hawaii	from Baltimore via Jacksonville (Note: No. 236: Baltimore → Jacksonville → Seattle. Multiple trades: Baltimore → Jacksonville (PD). Baltimore traded a seventh-round selection (236th overall) to Jacksonville in exchange for C Luke Bowanko. Jacksonville → Seattle (D). Jacksonville traded a seventh-round selection (236th overall) to Seattle in exchange for a 2020 sixth-round selection.)
7	237	Carolina Panthers	Terry Godwin	WR	Georgia	from Houston via Denver (Note: No. 237: Houston → Denver → Carolina. Multiple trades: Houston → Denver (PD). See Round 4: Houston → Denver. Denver → Carolina (D). See Round 6: Carolina → Denver.)
7	238	Chicago Bears	Stephen Denmark	CB	Valdosta State	
7	239	Minnesota Vikings	Dillon Mitchell	WR	Oregon	from Philadelphia via New England (Note: No. 239: Philadelphia → New England → Minnesota. Multiple trades: Philadelphia → New England (PD). Philadelphia traded a seventh-round selection (239th overall) and a 2018 seventh-round selection to New England in exchange for a 2018 seventh-round selection. New England → Minnesota (D). See Round 5: Minnesota → New England.)
7	240	Indianapolis Colts	Jackson Barton	T	Utah	
7	241	Dallas Cowboys	Jalen Jelks	DE	Oregon	
7	242	Los Angeles Chargers	Cortez Broughton	DT	Cincinnati	
7	243	Los Angeles Rams	Nick Scott	S	Penn State	from Kansas City via San Francisco, Cleveland and New England (Note: No. 243: Kansas City → San Francisco → Cleveland → New England → LA Rams. Multiple trades: Kansas City → San Francisco (PD). See Round 7: San Francisco → Kansas City. San Francisco → Cleveland (PD). San Francisco traded a conditional seventh-round selection (243rd overall) to Cleveland in exchange for OT Shon Coleman. Cleveland → New England (PD). See Round 5: New England → Cleveland. New England → LA Rams (D). See Round 4: LA Rams → New England.)
7	244	New Orleans Saints	Kaden Elliss	LB	Idaho	
7	245	New York Giants	Chris Slayton	DT	Syracuse	from LA Rams (Note: No. 245: LA Rams → NY Giants (PD). The LA Rams traded a seventh-round selection (245th overall) and LB Alec Ogletree to the NY Giants in exchange for 2018 fourth- and sixth-round selections.)
7	246	Indianapolis Colts	Javon Patterson	C	Ole Miss	from New England via Philadelphia (Note: No. 246: New England → Philadelphia → Indianapolis. Multiple trades: New England → Philadelphia (D). See Round 5: Philadelphia → New England. Philadelphia → Indianapolis (D). Philadelphia traded a seventh-round selection (246th overall) to Indianapolis in exchange for DT Hassan Ridgeway.)
7*	247	Minnesota Vikings	Bisi Johnson	WR	Colorado State	
7*	248	Arizona Cardinals	Joshua Miles	T	Morgan State	
7*	249	Arizona Cardinals	Michael Dogbe	DE	Temple	
7*	250	Minnesota Vikings	Austin Cutting	LS	Air Force	
7*	251	Los Angeles Rams	Dakota Allen	LB	Texas Tech	
7*	252	New England Patriots	Ken Webster	CB	Ole Miss	
7*	253	Washington Redskins	Jordan Brailford	DE	Oklahoma State	
7*	254	Arizona Cardinals	Caleb Wilson	TE	UCLA	

== Notable undrafted players ==
Original NFL team	Player	Pos.	College	Notes
Atlanta Falcons	Del'Shawn Phillips	LB	Illinois	
Atlanta Falcons	Olamide Zaccheaus	WR	Virginia	
Baltimore Ravens	Patrick Mekari	C	California	
Baltimore Ravens	Matthew Orzech	LS	Azusa Pacific	
Baltimore Ravens	Antoine Wesley	WR	Texas Tech	
Buffalo Bills	Tyrel Dodson	LB	Texas A&M	
Buffalo Bills	Blake Hance	G	Northwestern	
Buffalo Bills	Cam Lewis	CB	Buffalo	
Buffalo Bills	Chase McLaughlin	K	Illinois	
Buffalo Bills	David Sills	WR	West Virginia	
Carolina Panthers	Jordan Kunaszyk	LB	California	
Chicago Bears	Alex Bars	G	Notre Dame	
Chicago Bears	Jonathan Harris	DE	Lindenwood	
Chicago Bears	Jesper Horsted	DE	Princeton	
Chicago Bears	Sam Mustipher	C	Notre Dame	
Cleveland Browns	David Blough	QB	Purdue	
Cleveland Browns	Stephen Carlson	TE	Princeton	
Cleveland Browns	Jamie Gillan	P	Arkansas–Pine Bluff	PFWA All-Rookie team
Dallas Cowboys	Luke Gifford ^{†}	LB	Nebraska	
Dallas Cowboys	Jalen Guyton	WR	North Texas	
Dallas Cowboys	Brandon Knight	T	Indiana	
Dallas Cowboys	KaVontae Turpin ^{†}	WR	TCU	
Denver Broncos	Quinn Bailey	T	Arizona State	
Denver Broncos	Jacob Bobenmoyer	LS	Northern Colorado	
Denver Broncos	John Leglue	T	Tulane	
Denver Broncos	Malik Reed	LB	Nevada	
Denver Broncos	Brett Rypien	QB	Boise State	
Detroit Lions	Matt Nelson	T	Iowa	
Detroit Lions	C. J. Moore	S	Ole Miss	
Detroit Lions	Donald Parham	TE	Stetson	
Detroit Lions	Anthony Pittman	LB	Wayne State	
Detroit Lions	Kevin Strong	DE	UTSA	
Green Bay Packers	Yosh Nijman	T	Virginia Tech	
Houston Texans	Albert Huggins	DT	Clemson	
Indianapolis Colts	Ashton Dulin	WR	Malone	
Indianapolis Colts	Penny Hart	WR	Georgia State	
Jacksonville Jaguars	Joe Giles-Harris	LB	Duke	
Jacksonville Jaguars	Andrew Wingard	S	Wyoming	
Kansas City Chiefs	Jody Fortson	TE	Valdosta State	
Kansas City Chiefs	Jack Fox ^{†}	P	Rice	
Kansas City Chiefs	Darius Harris	LB	Middle Tennessee State	
Los Angeles Chargers	Roderic Teamer	S	Tulane	
Los Angeles Rams	Chandler Brewer	T	Middle Tennessee	
Los Angeles Rams	Marquise Copeland	DE	Cincinnati	
Los Angeles Rams	Troy Reeder	LB	Delaware	
Los Angeles Rams	Nsimba Webster	WR/KR	Eastern Washington	
Miami Dolphins	Shaq Calhoun	G	Mississippi State University	
Miami Dolphins	Trenton Irwin	WR	Stanford	
Miami Dolphins	Patrick Laird	RB	California	
Miami Dolphins	Jonathan Ledbetter	DE	Georgia	
Miami Dolphins	Chris Myarick	TE/FB	Temple	
Miami Dolphins	Nik Needham	CB	UTEP	
Miami Dolphins	Preston Williams	WR	Colorado State	
Minnesota Vikings	Khari Blasingame	FB	Vanderbilt	
Minnesota Vikings	Jake Browning	QB	Washington	
New England Patriots	Calvin Anderson	T	Texas	
New England Patriots	Andrew Beck	TE	Texas	
New England Patriots	Terez Hall	LB	Missouri	
New England Patriots	Jakobi Meyers	WR	NC State	
New England Patriots	Gunner Olszewski	WR	Bemidji State	First-team All-Pro in 2020 as a punt returner
New England Patriots	D'Angelo Ross	CB	New Mexico	
New Orleans Saints	Carl Granderson	DE	Wyoming	
New Orleans Saints	Porter Gustin	DE	USC	
New Orleans Saints	Deonte Harty ^{†}	WR	Assumption	
New Orleans Saints	Lil'Jordan Humphrey	WR	Texas	
New Orleans Saints	Shy Tuttle	DT	Tennessee	
New York Jets	Greg Dortch	WR	Wake Forest	
New York Jets	Kyle Phillips	DE	Tennessee	
New York Jets	Jeff Smith	WR	Boston College	
Oakland Raiders	A. J. Cole III ^{†}	P	NC State	
Oakland Raiders	Lester Cotton	G	Alabama	
Oakland Raiders	Alec Ingold ^{†}	FB	Wisconsin	
Oakland Raiders	Andre James	C	UCLA	
Oakland Raiders	Keisean Nixon ^{†}	CB	South Carolina	
Philadelphia Eagles	Ryan Bates	G	Penn State	
Philadelphia Eagles	T. J. Edwards	LB	Wisconsin	
Philadelphia Eagles	Nate Herbig	G	Stanford	
Philadelphia Eagles	Sua Opeta	G	Weber State	
Pittsburgh Steelers	Devlin Hodges	QB	Samford	Started 6 games for Pittsburgh in his rookie year
Pittsburgh Steelers	Fred Johnson	T	Florida	
Pittsburgh Steelers	P. J. Locke	S	Texas	
Pittsburgh Steelers	Matthew Wright	K	UCF	
San Francisco 49ers	Azeez Al-Shaair ^{†}	LB	Florida Atlantic	
San Francisco 49ers	Demetrius Flannigan-Fowles	LB	Arizona	
San Francisco 49ers	Kevin Givens	DT	Penn State	
Seattle Seahawks	Bryan Mone	DT	Michigan	
Tennessee Titans	Parker Hesse	TE	Iowa	
Tennessee Titans	Isaiah Mack	DT	Chattanooga	
Tennessee Titans	Derick Roberson	LB	Sam Houston State	
Washington Redskins	Craig Reynolds	RB	Kutztown	
Washington Redskins	Steven Sims	WR	Kansas	

== Supplemental draft ==
A supplemental draft was held on July 10, 2019. For each player selected in the supplemental draft, the team forfeited its pick in that round in the draft of the following season.

Rnd.	Pick	Team	Player	Pos.	College	Notes
5	–	Arizona Cardinals	Jalen Thompson	S	Washington State	

== Trades ==
(PD) indicates trades completed prior to the start of the draft (i.e. Pre-Draft), while (D) denotes trades which took place during the 2019 draft.

Round 1

Round 2

Round 3

Round 4

Round 5

Round 6

Round 7

== Media coverage ==
In November 2018, after having aired the final rounds of the draft on the network, ESPN announced that it would air coverage of all three days of the 2019 draft on ABC, using an entertainment-oriented format and hosted by the panel of College GameDay (which hosted an alternate ESPN2 broadcast of the previous draft), including Lee Corso, Rece Davis, Kirk Herbstreit and Desmond Howard. It marked the first time that broadcast television coverage of all three days of the NFL Draft had been carried by a single network; in 2018, the first two nights aired on Fox in association and simulcast with NFL Network. ESPN and NFL Network continued to broadcast more traditionally-formatted coverage. In addition, NFL Network's morning show Good Morning Football was simulcast on ESPN2 on both April 25 and 26, while ESPN and NFL Network personalities made appearances across the networks' studio programs.

The NFL reported an average viewership of 6.1 million across all ESPN and NFL outlets carrying coverage, up from the composite average of 5.5 million in 2018, and estimated that at least 47.5 million viewers watched coverage at some point during the draft. The NFL also reported that at least 600,000 people attended events associated with the draft, overtaking 2017 as the most-attended NFL Draft.

== Summary ==
=== Selections by NCAA conference ===
Conference	Round 1	Round 2	Round 3	Round 4	Round 5	Round 6	Round 7	Total
NCAA Division I FBS football conferences
AAC	1	2	1	2	1	1	3	11
ACC	7	2	3	4	5	5	2	28
Big 12	3	3	5	6	2	3	4	26
Big Ten	7	2	7	7	8	5	4	40
C-USA	0	0	4	0	0	1	1	6
Ind. (FBS)	1	1	2	2	0	1	1	8
MAC	0	2	1	1	0	5	0	9
MW	0	1	3	0	0	3	3	10
Pac-12	3	5	3	6	7	3	6	33
SEC	9	13	6	7	10	10	9	64
Sun Belt	0	0	0	0	0	1	0	1
NCAA Division I FCS football conferences
Big Sky	0	0	0	0	0	0	1	1
CAA	0	1	0	0	0	1	1	3
MEAC	0	0	0	0	0	0	2	2
MVFC	0	0	1	0	1	0	1	3
OVC	0	0	1	0	0	1	0	2
SWAC	1	0	0	0	0	0	1	2
NCAA Division II football conferences
GSC	0	0	0	0	0	0	1	1
LSC	0	0	0	0	1	0	0	1
MEC	0	0	0	1	0	0	0	1
MIAA	0	0	0	0	0	1	0	1
NSIC	0	0	1	0	0	0	0	1

A then-record 64 players were drafted from one conference, the second-most in NFL history, breaking the previous high of 63 selections in 2013. Both numbers were set by the Southeastern Conference. The record was broken in 2021, when 65 players were selected also from the SEC.

=== Schools with multiple draft selections ===
Selections	Schools
10	Alabama
9	Ohio State
8	Oklahoma, Washington
7	Georgia, Texas A&M
6	Auburn, Clemson, Notre Dame, Ole Miss, Penn State
5	Florida, Kentucky, Miami, Michigan, Mississippi State, Stanford, Utah, West Virginia
4	Boston College, Iowa, Maryland, NC State, Oregon, USC, Wisconsin
3	Arkansas, Houston, LSU, South Carolina, TCU, Temple
2	Arizona State, Central Michigan, Florida Atlantic, Florida State, Hawaii, Iowa State, Kansas State, Memphis, Michigan State, Missouri, Northern Illinois, Oklahoma State, Old Dominion, Rutgers, Texas, Toledo, Vanderbilt, Virginia, Washington State

Of note, Allen High School boasted three selections in the 2019 NFL draft, by drafting Kyler Murray, Greg Little, and Bobby Evans.

=== Selections by position ===
Position	Round 1	Round 2	Round 3	Round 4	Round 5	Round 6	Round 7	Total
Center	1	2	0	0	0	1	1	5
Cornerback	1	7	3	4	3	8	6	32
Defensive end	6	0	4	5	2	2	6	25
Defensive tackle	6	1	2	2	3	3	4	21
Guard	1	0	3	6	1	0	1	12
Kicker	0	0	0	0	2	0	0	2
Linebacker	3	2	6	2	12	4	3	31
Long snapper	0	0	0	0	0	0	1	1
Offensive tackle	4	5	4	0	1	5	4	23
Punter	0	0	0	1	1	0	0	2
Quarterback	3	1	1	2	2	2	0	11
Running back	1	1	5	4	3	6	5	25
Safety	2	4	2	5	2	3	1	19
Tight end	2	2	4	2	1	1	4	16
Wide receiver	2	7	4	3	2	6	4	28

Position	Round 1	Round 2	Round 3	Round 4	Round 5	Round 6	Round 7	Total
Offense	14	18	21	17	10	21	19	120
Defense	18	14	17	18	22	20	20	129
Special teams	0	0	0	1	3	0	1	5
