= Terry Beckner =

American football player (born 1997)

Profile
- Position: Defensive tackle

Personal information
- Born: March 2, 1997 (age 29); East St. Louis, Illinois, U.S.
- Listed height: 6 ft 4 in (1.93 m)
- Listed weight: 305 lb (138 kg)

Career information
- High school: East St. Louis
- College: Missouri (2015–2018)
- NFL draft: 2019: 7th round, 215th overall pick

Career history
- Tampa Bay Buccaneers (2019)*; Chicago Bears (2020)*; Pittsburgh Maulers (2022–2023); Calgary Stampeders (2024)*; Massachusetts Pirates (2025)
- * Offseason or practice squad member only

Awards and highlights
- Second-team All-IFL (2026); Freshman All-American (2015); Second-team All-SEC (2018)
- Stats at Pro Football Reference

Terry Beckner Jr. (born March 2, 1997) is an American professional football defensive tackle. He played college football for the Missouri Tigers. He was selected by the Tampa Bay Buccaneers in the seventh round of the 2019 NFL draft.

== Early life ==
In Beckner's final season at East St. Louis, he recorded 107 tackles and 7 sacks. He played in the 2015 Under Armour All-America Game.

== College career ==
Beckner played as a true freshman at Missouri, and was named a Freshman All-American by Sporting News even though his season ended early after an MCL and ACL tear in his right knee against Brigham Young on November 14. He had 27 total tackles, 8 being for loss, 3 sacks and a fumble recovery.

On January 20, 2016, Beckner was arrested during a traffic stop for possession of less than 35 grams of marijuana, a misdemeanor, while driving a Chrysler 300 through Columbia. The following day, Tigers head coach Barry Odom suspended Beckner indefinitely from the Missouri football team.

Before tearing his ACL in his left knee against Middle Tennessee, Beckner totaled 24 tackles, 2 being for loss, and a fumble recovery in the 2016 season.

== Professional career ==
=== Tampa Bay Buccaneers ===
Beckner was selected by the Tampa Bay Buccaneers in the seventh round, 215th overall, of the 2019 NFL draft. On August 31, 2019, Beckner was waived by the Buccaneers and was signed to the practice squad the next day. He was suspended for four games by the NFL for violating the league's policy on performance-enhancing drugs on October 21, 2019. He was reinstated from suspension on November 18, 2019, and the Buccaneers released him from their practice squad.

=== Chicago Bears ===
Beckner had a tryout with the Chicago Bears on August 20, 2020. He was signed to the team's practice squad on September 29. He was released by the team on October 27.

=== Pittsburgh Maulers ===
Beckner signed with the Pittsburgh Maulers of the United States Football League (USFL) on May 6, 2022, and he was subsequently transferred to the team's inactive roster. He was moved to the active roster on May 14. He was placed on injured reserve on June 1. Beckner re-signed with the Maulers on August 10, 2023. The Maulers folded when the XFL and USFL merged to create the United Football League (UFL).

=== Calgary Stampeders ===
On February 14, 2024, Beckner signed with the Calgary Stampeders of the Canadian Football League (CFL). He was released on May 12, 2024.

=== Massachusetts Pirates ===
On February 14, 2025, Beckner signed with the Massachusetts Pirates.
