= Terez Hall =

American football player (born 1996)

Profile
- Position: Linebacker

Personal information
- Born: November 18, 1996 (age 30); Lithonia, Georgia, U.S.
- Listed height: 6 ft 2 in (1.88 m)
- Listed weight: 240 lb (109 kg)

Career information
- High school: King (Lithonia, Georgia)
- College: Missouri (2015–2018)
- NFL draft: 2019: undrafted

Career history
- New England Patriots (2019–2023)

Career NFL statistics as of 2023
- Total tackles: 50
- Pass deflections: 2
- Stats at Pro Football Reference

Terez Hall (born November 18, 1996) is an American professional football linebacker. He played college football for the Missouri Tigers.

== College career ==
Hall was a member of the Missouri Tigers for four seasons. As a junior, he finished second on the team with 85 tackles and 12.5 tackles for loss with one sack. Hall was named a team captain going into his senior season and ended the year with 74 tackles, nine tackles for loss, five sacks, seven quarterback hurries and one interception. Hall finished his collegiate career with 186 tackles, six sacks, an interception and a forced fumble in 48 games played.

== Professional career ==
Pre-draft measurables
Height	Weight	Arm length	Hand span	40-yard dash	10-yard split	20-yard split	20-yard shuttle	Vertical jump	Broad jump	Bench press
6 ft 1 1/8 in (1.86 m)	230 lb (104 kg)	33 1/2 in (0.85 m)	10 3/8 in (0.26 m)	4.90 s	1.66 s	2.70 s	4.38 s	39.5 in (1.00 m)	9 ft 11 in (3.02 m)	20 reps
All values from NFL Combine/Pro Day

Hall was signed by the New England Patriots as an undrafted free agent on April 27, 2019. He was waived on August 31, 2019, during final roster cuts and was re-signed to the team's practice squad the following day. Hall remained on the practice squad for the remainder of the season and signed a reserve/futures contract with the Patriots on January 6, 2020.

Hall was waived during final roster cuts on September 5, 2020, but was again re-signed to the practice squad the next day. He was elevated to the active roster on November 9, 2020, and made his debut that night on Monday Night Football, starting at linebacker and making six total tackles in a 30–27 win over the New York Jets. He reverted to the practice squad after the game. He was elevated again on November 14 for the team's week 10 game against the Baltimore Ravens, and reverted to the practice squad again following the game. He was promoted to the active roster on November 21.

Hall was placed on the reserve/physically unable to perform list to start the 2021 season.

On May 5, 2022, Hall was released following a failed physical. He was re-signed to the practice squad on December 20, 2022. He signed a reserve/future contract on January 10, 2023. He was released on an injury waiver on August 3, 2023.
