= Larry Rountree III =

American gridiron football player (born 1999)

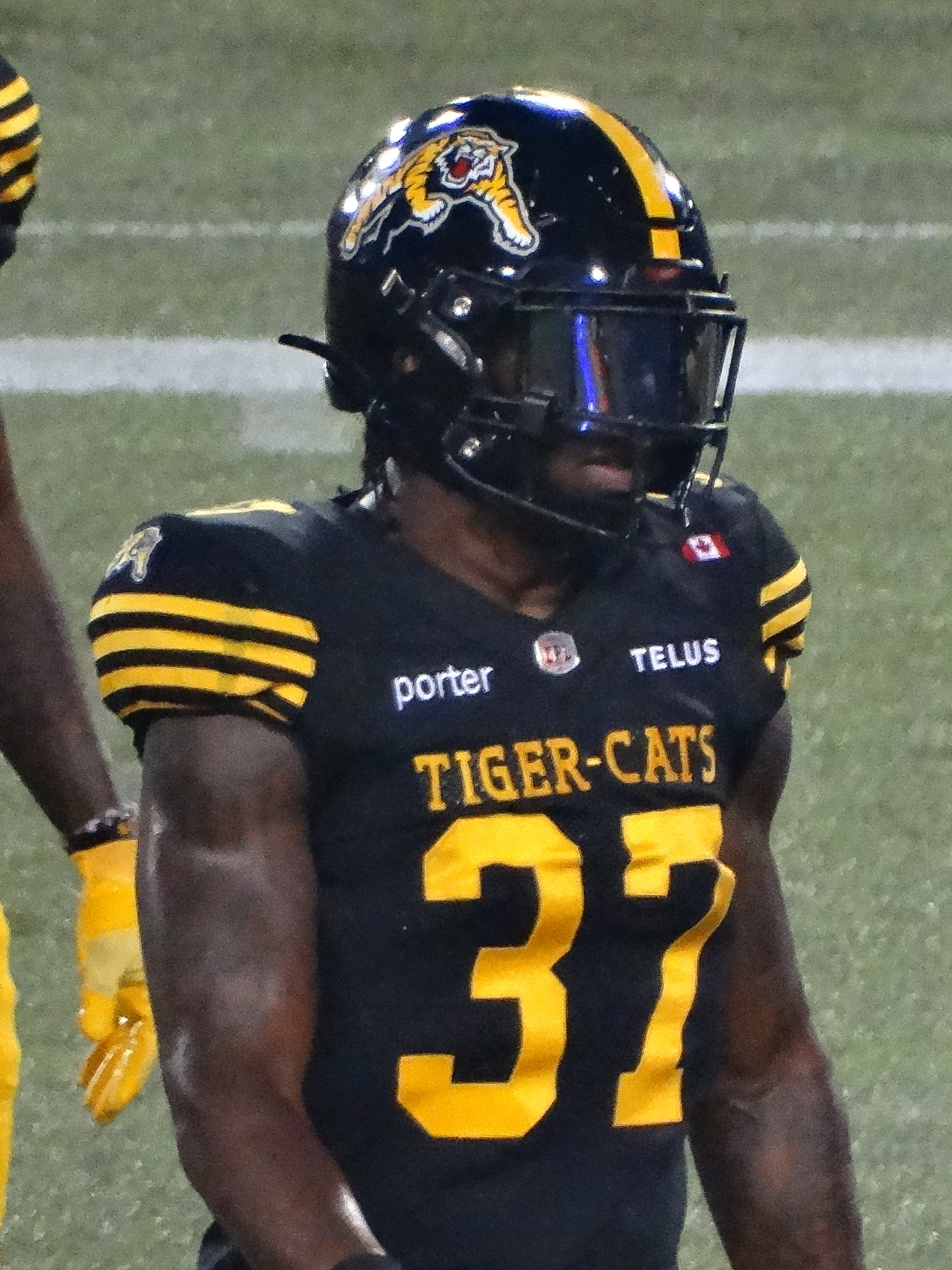
- Rountree with the Hamilton Tiger-Cats in 2026

No. 37 – Hamilton Tiger-Cats
- Position: Running back
- Roster status: Active
- CFL status: American

Personal information
- Born: February 13, 1999 (age 27); Raleigh, North Carolina, U.S.
- Listed height: 5 ft 10 in (1.78 m)
- Listed weight: 210 lb (95 kg)

Career information
- High school: Millbrook (Raleigh)
- College: Missouri (2017–2020)
- NFL draft: 2021: 6th round, 198th overall pick

Career history
- Los Angeles Chargers (2021–2022); Houston Texans (2023)*; Birmingham Stallions (2024–2025); Hamilton Tiger-Cats (2026–present)
- * Offseason or practice squad member only

Awards and highlights
- UFL champion (2024); Second-team All-SEC (2020)

Career NFL statistics
- Rushing yards: 106
- Rushing average: 2.2
- Rushing touchdowns: 1
- Receptions: 3
- Receiving yards: 13
- Stats at Pro Football Reference

Larry Rountree III (born February 13, 1999) is an American professional football running back for the Hamilton Tiger-Cats of the Canadian Football League (CFL). He played college football for the Missouri Tigers, receiving second-team All-SEC honors in 2020. Rountree was selected in the sixth round of the 2021 NFL draft by the Los Angeles Chargers, where he played two seasons. He joined the Birmingham Stallions in 2024 and was a member of the team that won the 2024 UFL championship game.

== Early life ==
Rountree was born on February 13 1999, in Raleigh, North Carolina. He attended Millbrook High School in Raleigh, North Carolina. As a senior, he ran for 1,147 yards on 201 carries with 21 touchdowns. He committed to the University of Missouri to play college football.

== College career ==
As a true freshman at Missouri in 2017, Rountree played in all 13 games and rushed for 703 yards on 126 carries with six touchdowns. As a sophomore, he became the starting running back, rushing 225 times for 1,216 yards and 11 touchdowns. As a junior, he rushed for 829 yards on 186 carries and nine touchdowns. Rountree returned to Missouri his senior year in 2020. During the season, he rushed for 972 yards and set the school record for career rushing yards (3,720) by a running back.

== Professional career ==
Pre-draft measurables
Height	Weight	Arm length	Hand span	Wingspan	40-yard dash	10-yard split	20-yard split	20-yard shuttle	Three-cone drill	Vertical jump	Broad jump	Bench press
5 ft 10 5/8 in (1.79 m)	211 lb (96 kg)	30 3/4 in (0.78 m)	9 1/4 in (0.23 m)	6 ft 1 7/8 in (1.88 m)	4.68 s	1.73 s	2.68 s	4.47 s	6.96 s	30.0 in (0.76 m)	9 ft 0 in (2.74 m)	18 reps
All values from Pro Day

=== Los Angeles Chargers ===
Rountree was selected in the sixth round (198th overall) in the 2021 NFL draft by the Los Angeles Chargers.

Rountree scored his first NFL touchdown on a one-yard rush in a Week 10 game of the 2021 season against the Minnesota Vikings.

On August 31, 2022, Rountree was waived by the Chargers and re-signed to the practice squad. He was promoted to the active roster on November 12, 2022. He was waived on November 26 and re-signed to the practice squad. He signed a reserve/future contract on January 17, 2023.

Rountree was waived by the Chargers on August 14, 2023.

=== Houston Texans ===
On August 18, 2023, Rountree signed with the Houston Texans. He was waived on August 29, 2023. He was re-signed to the practice squad on September 6, 2023. He was released on September 12, 2023.

=== Birmingham Stallions ===
On January 19, 2024, Rountree signed with the Birmingham Stallions of the United Football League (UFL). He re-signed with the team on August 28, 2024.

Rountree scored his first touchdown with them on April 27, 2024, against the Houston Roughnecks.

=== Hamilton Tiger-Cats ===
On January 26, 2026, Rountree signed with the Hamilton Tiger-Cats of the Canadian Football League (CFL).
