= 2018 Florida Gators football team =

American college football season

2018 Florida Gators football

Peach Bowl champion

Peach Bowl, W 41–15 vs. Michigan
- Conference: Southeastern Conference
- Eastern Division

Ranking
- Coaches: No. 6
- AP: No. 7
- Record: 10–3 (5–3 SEC)
- Head coach: Dan Mullen (1st season)
- Co-offensive coordinators: Billy Gonzales (1st season); John Hevesy (1st season)
- Offensive scheme: Spread
- Defensive coordinator: Todd Grantham (1st season)
- Base defense: 3–4
- Home stadium: Ben Hill Griffin Stadium

2018 Southeastern Conference football standings
	Conf.			Overall
Team	W		L	W		L
Eastern Division
No. T–7 Georgia x	7	–	1	11	–	3
No. 12 Kentucky	5	–	3	10	–	3
No. T–7 Florida	5	–	3	10	–	3
South Carolina	4	–	4	7	–	6
Missouri	4	–	4	8	–	5
Vanderbilt	3	–	5	6	–	7
Tennessee	2	–	6	5	–	7
Western Division
No. 2 Alabama x$^	8	–	0	14	–	1
No. 16 Texas A&M	5	–	3	9	–	4
No. 6 LSU	5	–	3	10	–	3
Mississippi State*	4	–	4	8	–	5
Auburn	3	–	5	8	–	5
Ole Miss	1	–	7	5	–	7
Arkansas	0	–	8	2	–	10
Championship: Alabama 35, Georgia 28
^ – College Football Playoff participant; $ – Conference champion; x – Division champion/co-champions; * Mississippi State vacated four conference and eight total wins due to NCAA violations.; Rankings from AP Poll

The 2018 Florida Gators football team represented the University of Florida in the 2018 NCAA Division I FBS football season. The Gators played their home games at Ben Hill Griffin Stadium in Gainesville, Florida. Florida played as a member of the Eastern Division of the Southeastern Conference (SEC). They were led by first-year head coach Dan Mullen.

Florida, coming off a 4–7 season in 2017, began the year unranked. In the second game of the season, not only did the team lose to Kentucky for the first time since 1986, but they also lost to them at home for the first time since 1979, snapping a 31-game winning streak in the series. Florida won its next five games, including on the road against No. 23 Mississippi State and at home against No. 5 LSU, rising to ninth in the AP Poll. They then lost two games to No. 7 Georgia and Missouri and ended the conference regular season tied for second in the SEC East Division at 5–3. After closing the regular season by defeating rival Florida State, they were invited to the Peach Bowl, where they defeated No. 8 Michigan by a score of 41–15. The team finished with an overall record of 10–3, and in the season's final AP Poll, the team was ranked in a tie for seventh, the highest finish for the school since 2009.

The team was led on offense by redshirt sophomore quarterback Feleipe Franks, who finished with 2,457 passing yards, 24 passing touchdowns, and 7 rushing touchdowns. His 31 total touchdowns was tied for third in the Southeastern Conference. Running backs La'Mical Perine and Jordan Scarlett finished with 826 and 776 yards, respectively. Defensively, the team was led by defensive end Jachai Polite, who finished with 20 tackles for loss and was named first-team All-SEC.

== Preseason ==
=== Award watch lists ===
Listed in the order that they were released

Award	Player	Position	Year
Lott Trophy	C. J. Gardner-Johnson	DB	JR
Rimington Trophy	T. J. McCoy	C	JR
Chuck Bednarik Award	David Reese	LB	JR
Butkus Award	David Reese	LB	JR
Bronko Nagurski Trophy	Cece Jefferson	DE	SR
Bronko Nagurski Trophy	David Reese	LB	JR
Outland Trophy	Martez Ivey	OL	SR
Wuerffel Trophy	Fred Johnson	OL	SR
Ted Hendricks Award	Cece Jefferson	DE	SR
Ted Hendricks Award	Jabari Zuniga	DE	JR
Earl Campbell Tyler Rose Award	Tyrie Cleveland	WR	JR

=== SEC media poll ===
The SEC media poll was released on July 20, 2018, with the Gators predicted to finish third in the East Division.

=== Preseason All-SEC teams ===
The Gators had eight players selected to the preseason all-SEC teams.

Offense

1st team

Martez Ivey – OL

3rd team

Jordan Scarlett – RB

Defense

1st team

CeCe Jefferson – DL

2nd team

C. J. Gardner-Johnson – DB

C. J. Henderson – DB

3rd team

David Reese – LB

Marco Wilson – DB

Specialists

3rd team

Kadarius Toney – all purpose player

== Schedule ==
Date	Time	Opponent	Rank	Site	TV	Result	Attendance
September 1	7:30 p.m.	Charleston Southern*		Ben Hill Griffin Stadium; Gainesville, FL	SECN	W 53–6	81,164
September 8	7:30 p.m.	Kentucky	No. 25	Ben Hill Griffin Stadium; Gainesville, FL (rivalry)	SECN	L 16–27	80,651
September 15	4:00 p.m.	Colorado State*		Ben Hill Griffin Stadium; Gainesville, FL	SECN	W 48–10	80,021
September 22	7:00 p.m.	at Tennessee		Neyland Stadium; Knoxville, TN (rivalry)	ESPN	W 47–21	100,027
September 29	6:00 p.m.	at No. 23 Mississippi State		Davis Wade Stadium; Starkville, MS (SEC Nation)	ESPN	W 13–6	61,406
October 6	3:30 p.m.	No. 5 LSU	No. 22	Ben Hill Griffin Stadium; Gainesville, FL (rivalry / SEC Nation)	CBS	W 27–19	90,283
October 13	12:00 p.m.	at Vanderbilt	No. 14	Vanderbilt Stadium; Nashville, TN	ESPN	W 37–27	31,118
October 27	3:30 p.m.	vs. No. 7 Georgia	No. 9	TIAA Bank Field; Jacksonville, FL (rivalry/College GameDay / SEC Nation)	CBS	L 17–36	84,463
November 3	4:00 p.m.	Missouri^{†}	No. 13	Ben Hill Griffin Stadium; Gainesville, FL	SECN	L 17–38	80,017
November 10	12:00 p.m.	South Carolina	No. 19	Ben Hill Griffin Stadium; Gainesville, FL	ESPN	W 35–31	82,696
November 17	12:00 p.m.	Idaho*	No. 15	Ben Hill Griffin Stadium; Gainesville, FL	ESPNU	W 63–10	81,467
November 24	12:00 p.m.	at Florida State*	No. 13	Doak Campbell Stadium; Tallahassee, FL (rivalry)	ABC	W 41–14	71,953
December 29	12:00 p.m.	vs. No. 8 Michigan*	No. 10	Mercedes-Benz Stadium; Atlanta, GA (Peach Bowl)	ESPN	W 41–15	74,006
*Non-conference game; ^{†}Homecoming; Rankings from AP Poll and CFP Rankings after October 30 released prior to game; All times are in Eastern time

== Rankings ==
Ranking movements Legend: ██ Increase in ranking ██ Decrease in ranking — = Not ranked RV = Received votes т = Tied with team above or below
	Week															
Poll	Pre	1	2	3	4	5	6	7	8	9	10	11	12	13	14	Final
AP	RV	25	—	—	RV	22	14	11	9	13	19	15	13	11	10	7т
Coaches	RV	25	—	RV	RV	RV	16	12	11	14	21	16	13	10	10	6
CFP	Not released									11	15	13	11	9	10	Not released

== Game summaries ==
=== Charleston Southern ===
Charleston Southern Buccaneers at Florida Gators – Game summary

Quarter	1	2	3	4	Total
Charleston Southern	0	0	0	6	6
Florida	10	28	13	2	53

at Ben Hill Griffin Stadium • Gainesville, Florida

- Date: September 1, 2018
- Game time: 7:30 p.m.
- Game weather: Temperature: 85 °F (29 °C) • Wind: E at 7 miles per hour (11 km/h) • Weather: 67% humidity, clear
- Game attendance: 81,164
- Referee: John McDaid
- TV announcers (SEC Network): Tom Hart, Jordan Rodgers, and Cole Cubelic
- Boxscore

Game information

First Quarter

- Florida – Trevon Grimes 34-yard pass from Feleipe Franks (Evan McPherson kick), 12:40
- Florida – Evan McPherson 21-yard field goal, 8:10

Second Quarter

- Florida – Van Jefferson 6-yard pass from Feleipe Franks (Evan McPherson kick), 13:19
- Florida – Josh Hammond 6-yard pass from Feleipe Franks (Evan McPherson kick), 9:51
- Florida – Tyrie Cleveland 3-yard pass from Feleipe Franks (Evan McPherson kick), 5:49
- Florida – Van Jefferson 3-yard pass from Feleipe Franks (Evan McPherson kick), 1:39

Third Quarter

- Florida – Evan McPherson 31-yard field goal, 10:58
- Florida – Kyle Trask 12-yard run (Jorge Powell kick), 7:28
- Florida – Jorge Powell 39-yard field goal, 4:48

Fourth Quarter

- Charleston Southern – Terrence Wilson 22-yard run, 13:40
- Florida – Austin Perry 98-yard PAT return, 13:40

Passing leaders

- CHSO – London Johnson – 3/12, 2 yards
- FLA – Feleipe Franks – 16/24, 219 yards, 5 touchdowns

Rushing leaders

- CHSO – Ronnie Harris – 8 carries, 83 yards
- FLA – Dameon Pierce – 9 carries, 73 yards

Receiving leaders

- CHSO – Taz Lindsey and Geoffrey Wall – 1 reception, 5 yards
- FLA – Freddie Swain – 2 receptions, 57 yards

Tackling leaders

- CHSO – Solomon Brown – 8 tackles
- FLA – C. J. Gardner-Johnson and Rayshad Jackson – 5 tackles

Overall record	Previous meeting	Previous winner
1–0	September 5, 2009	Florida, 62–3

Uniform Combination
Helmet	Jersey	Pants

=== Kentucky ===
Kentucky Wildcats at Florida Gators – Game summary

Quarter	1	2	3	4	Total
Kentucky	7	0	14	6	27
No. 25 Florida	0	10	0	6	16

at Ben Hill Griffin Stadium • Gainesville, Florida

- Date: September 8, 2018
- Game time: 7:30 p.m.
- Game weather: Temperature: 79 °F (26 °C) • Wind: ESE at 1 mile per hour (1.6 km/h) • Weather: 81% humidity, partly cloudy
- Game attendance: 80,651
- Referee: David Smith
- TV announcers (SEC Network): Tom Hart, Jordan Rodgers, and Cole Cubelic
- Boxscore

Game information

First Quarter

- Kentucky – David Bouvier 29-yard pass from Terry Wilson (Miles Butler kick), 5:07

Second Quarter

- Florida – Evan McPherson 29-yard field goal, 14:03
- Florida – Moral Stephens 18-yard pass from Feleipe Franks (Evan McPherson kick), 8:27

Third Quarter

- Kentucky – Terry Wilson 24-yard run (Miles Butler kick), 9:49
- Kentucky – Lynn Bowden 54-yard pass from Terry Wilson (Miles Butler kick), 4:11

Fourth Quarter

- Florida – Freddie Swain 4-yard pass from Feleipe Franks, 3:34
- Kentucky – Davonte Robinson 30-yard fumble recovery, 0:00

Passing leaders

- KEN – Terry Wilson – 11/16, 151 yards, 2 touchdowns, 1 interception
- FLA – Feleipe Franks – 17/38, 232 yards, 2 touchdowns, 1 interception

Rushing leaders

- KEN – Benny Snell – 175 yards
- FLA – Feleipe Franks – 44 yards

Receiving leaders

- KEN – Lynn Bowden – 4 receptions, 79 yards, 1 touchdown
- FLA – Kadarius Toney – 2 receptions, 35 yards

Tackling leaders

- KEN – Kash Daniel – 11 tackles
- FLA – Rayshad Jackson – 9 tackles

Overall record	Previous meeting	Previous winner
51–17	September 23, 2017	Florida, 28–27

Uniform Combination
Helmet	Jersey	Pants

=== Colorado State ===
Colorado State Rams at Florida Gators – Game summary

Quarter	1	2	3	4	Total
Colorado State	0	3	7	0	10
Florida	6	21	0	21	48

at Ben Hill Griffin Stadium • Gainesville, Florida

- Date: September 15, 2018
- Game time: 4:00 p.m.
- Game weather: Temperature: 96 °F (36 °C) • Wind: SW at 14 miles per hour (23 km/h) • Weather: 45% humidity, partly cloudy
- Game attendance: 80,021
- Referee: Marc Curles
- TV announcers (SEC Network): Taylor Zarzour, Matt Stinchcomb, and Kris Budden
- Boxscore

Game information

First Quarter

- Florida – Evan McPherson 24-yard field goal, 10:48
- Florida – Evan McPherson 48-yard field goal, 2:14

Second Quarter

- Florida – Jordan Scarlett 30-yard run (Evan McPherson kick), 11:49
- Florida – Freddie Swain 18-yard pass from Feleipe Franks (Evan McPherson kick), 6:24
- Florida – Tyrie Cleveland 0-yard punt return, 4:02
- Colorado State – Wyatt Bryan 53-yard field goal, 0:00

Third Quarter

- Colorado State – Trey McBride 48-yard pass from K.J. Carta-Samuels (Wyatt Bryan kick), 11:27

Fourth Quarter

- Florida – Freddie Swain 85-yard punt return (Evan McPherson kick), 13:25
- Florida – Van Jefferson 38-yard pass from Feleipe Franks (Evan McPherson kick), 9:21
- Florida – Daemon Pierce 68-yard run (Jorge Powell kick), 6:17

Passing leaders

- CSU – K. J. Carta-Samuels – 21/33, 217 yards, 1 touchdown
- FLA – Feleipe Franks – 8/15, 119 yards, 2 touchdowns, 1 interception

Rushing leaders

- CSU – Marvin Kinsey Jr. – 15 carries, 79 yards
- FLA – Dameon Pierce – 5 carries, 87 yards, 1 touchdown

Receiving leaders

- CSU – Preston Williams – 9 receptions, 106 yards
- FLA – Van Jefferson – 2 receptions, 62 yards, 1 touchdown

Tackling leaders

- CSU – Josh Watson – 5 tackles
- FLA – James Houston IV – 8 tackles

Overall record	Previous meeting	Previous winner
First meeting

Uniform Combination
Helmet	Jersey	Pants

=== Tennessee ===
Florida Gators at Tennessee Volunteers – Game summary

Quarter	1	2	3	4	Total
Florida	14	12	7	14	47
Tennessee	0	3	10	8	21

at Neyland Stadium • Knoxville, Tennessee

- Date: September 22, 2018
- Game time: 7:00 p.m.
- Game weather: Temperature: 85 °F (29 °C) • Wind: N at 3 miles per hour (4.8 km/h) • Weather: Partly cloudy
- Game attendance: 100,027
- Referee: James Carter
- TV announcers (ESPN): Adam Amin, Rod Gilmore, and Quint Kessenich
- Boxscore

Game information

First Quarter

- Florida – R.J. Raymond 1 yard pass from Feleipe Franks (Evan McPherson kick), 6:50
- Florida – Feleipe Franks 1 yard run (Evan McPherson kick), 4:52

Second Quarter

- Tennessee – Brent Cimaglia 32-yard field goal, 13:13
- Florida – Cece Jefferson safety, 11:03
- Florida – Freddie Swain 65-yard pass from Feleipe Franks (Evan McPherson kick), 10:42
- Florida – Evan McPherson 25-yard field goal, 0:15

Third Quarter

- Florida – Jordan Scarlett 19-yard run (Evan McPherson kick), 14:44
- Tennessee – Brent Cimaglia 41-yard field goal, 12:38
- Tennessee – Madre London 1 yard run (Brent Cimaglia kick), 1:22

Fourth Quarter

- Florida – Tyrie Cleveland 38-yard pass from Feleipe Franks (Evan McPherson kick), 13:17
- Tennessee – Jeremy Banks 2-yard run (Jauan Jennings pass from Keller Chryst), 5:04
- Florida – Dameon Pierce 47-yard run (Evan McPherson kick), 4:54

Passing leaders

- FLA – Feleipe Franks – 9/18, 172 yards, 3 touchdowns
- TEN – Jarrett Guarantano – 7/18, 164 yards, 2 interceptions

Rushing leaders

- FLA – Jordan Scarlett – 11 carries, 77 yards
- TEN – Ty Chandler – 11 carries, 66 yards; Madre London – 11 carries, 66 yards

Receiving leaders

- FLA – Freddie Swain – 2 receptions, 88 yards, 1 touchdown
- TEN – Jauan Jennings – 4 receptions, 60 yards

Tackling leaders

- FLA – David Reese II – 11 tackles
- TEN – Baylen Buchanan – 5 tackles

Overall record	Previous meeting	Previous winner
27–20	September 16, 2017	Florida, 26–20

Uniform Combination
Helmet	Jersey	Pants

=== Mississippi State ===
Florida Gators at Mississippi State Bulldogs – Game summary

Quarter	1	2	3	4	Total
Florida	0	3	7	3	13
No. 23 Mississippi State	3	3	0	0	6

at Davis Wade Stadium • Starkville, Mississippi

- Date: September 29, 2018
- Game time: 6:00 p.m.
- Game weather: Temperature: 79 °F (26 °C) • Wind: N at 1 mile per hour (1.6 km/h) • Weather: Partly cloudy
- Game attendance: 61,406
- Referee: Matt Austin
- TV announcers (ESPN): Dave Pasch, Greg McElroy, Tom Luginbill
- Boxscore

Game information

First Quarter

- Mississippi State – Jace Christmann 34-yard field goal, 3:28

Second Quarter

- Florida – Evan McPherson 39-yard field goal, 10:24
- Mississippi State – Jace Christmann 39-yard field goal, 3:30

Third Quarter

- Florida – Moral Stephens 20-yard pass from Kadarius Toney (Evan McPherson kick), 8:26

Fourth Quarter

- Florida – Evan McPherson 21-yard field goal 5:22

Passing leaders

- FLA – Feleipe Franks – 22/31, 219 yards, 1 interception
- MSU – Nick Fitzgerald – 11/26, 98 yards

Rushing leaders

- FLA – La'Mical Perine – 10 carries, 55 yards
- MSU – Kylin Hill – 9 carries, 41 yards

Receiving leaders

- FLA – Josh Hammond – 3 receptions, 47 yards
- MSU – Osirus Mitchell – 3 receptions, 35 yards

Tackling leaders

- FLA – C. J. Gardner-Johnson and Vosean Joseph – 7 tackles
- MSU – Erroll Thompson – 14 tackles

Overall record	Previous meeting	Previous winner
33–19–2	October 16, 2010	Mississippi State, 10–7

Uniform Combination
Helmet	Jersey	Pants

=== LSU ===
LSU Tigers at Florida Gators – Game summary

Quarter	1	2	3	4	Total
No. 5 LSU	7	3	3	6	19
No. 22 Florida	0	14	0	13	27

at Ben Hill Griffin Stadium • Gainesville, Florida

- Date: October 6, 2018
- Game time: 3:30 p.m.
- Game weather: Temperature: 88 °F (31 °C) • Wind: ENE at 7 miles per hour (11 km/h) • Weather: 51% humidity, sunny
- Game attendance: 90,283
- Referee: Matt Loeffler
- TV announcers (CBS): Brad Nessler, Gary Danielson, and Jamie Erdahl
- Boxscore

Game information

First Quarter

- LSU – Nick Brossette 4-yard run (Cole Tracy kick), 11:43

Second Quarter

- Florida – La'Mical Perine 1 yard run (Evan McPherson kick), 12:30
- LSU – Cole Tracy 33-yard field goal, 3:10
- Florida – Moral Stephens 3-yard pass from Feleipe Franks (Evan McPherson kick), 1:09

Third Quarter

- LSU – Cole Tracy 42-yard field goal, 4:16

Fourth Quarter

- LSU – Nick Brossette 1 yard run, 11:14
- Florida – La'Mical Perine 2-yard run, 8:48
- Florida – Brad Stewart, Jr. 25-yard interception return (Evan McPherson kick), 1:45

Passing leaders

- LSU – Joe Burrow – 19/34, 191 yards, 2 interceptions
- FLA – Feleipe Franks – 12/27, 161 yards, 1 touchdown, 1 interception

Rushing leaders

- LSU – Nick Brossette – 15 carries, 95 yards, 2 touchdowns
- FLA – La'Mical Perine – 17 carries, 85 yards, 2 touchdowns

Receiving leaders

- LSU – Justin Jefferson – 3 receptions, 50 yards
- FLA – Josh Hammond – 3 receptions, 85 yards

Tackling leaders

- LSU – Micah Baskerville – 11 tackles
- FLA – Vosean Joseph – 14 tackles

Overall record	Previous meeting	Previous winner
32–29–3	October 7, 2017	LSU, 17–16

Uniform Combination
Helmet	Jersey	Pants

=== Vanderbilt ===
Florida Gators at Vanderbilt Commodores – Game summary

Quarter	1	2	3	4	Total
No. 14 Florida	0	13	7	17	37
Vanderbilt	7	14	0	6	27

at Vanderbilt Stadium • Nashville, Tennessee

- Date: October 13, 2018
- Game time: 12:00 p.m.
- Game weather: Temperature: 50 °F (10 °C) • Wind: NE at 7 miles per hour (11 km/h) • Weather: Cloudy
- Game attendance: 31,118
- Referee: Lee Hedrick
- TV announcers (ESPN): Dave Pasch, Greg McElroy, Tom Luginbill
- Boxscore

Game information

First Quarter

- Vanderbilt – Jared Pinkney 1 yard pass from Kyle Shurmur (Ryley Guay kick), 6:23

Second Quarter

- Florida – Evan McPherson 21-yard field goal, 14:14
- Vanderbilt – Ke'Shawn Vaughn 75-yard pass from Kyle Shurmur (Ryley Guay kick), 13:59
- Vanderbilt – Jamauri Wakefield 7-yard run (Ryley Guay kick), 6:42
- Florida – La'Mical Perine 7-yard run (Evan McPherson kick), 2:30
- Florida – Evan McPherson 25-yard field goal, 0:00

Third Quarter

- Florida – Van Jefferson 38-yard pass from Feleipe Franks (Evan McPherson kick), 5:23

Fourth Quarter

- Florida – Jordan Scarlett 48-yard run (Evan McPherson kick), 14:52
- Vanderbilt – Ryley Guay 42-yard field goal, 12:10
- Florida – Freddie Swain 11-yard pass from Feleipe Franks (Evan McPherson kick), 8:07
- Vanderbilt – Ryley Guay 53-yard field goal, 3:55
- Florida – Evan McPherson 43-yard field goal, 0:37

Passing leaders

- FLA – Feleipe Franks – 19/29, 284 yards, 2 touchdowns, 1 interception
- VAN – Kyle Shurmur – 18/36, 229 yards, 2 touchdowns, 1 interception

Rushing leaders

- FLA – La'Mical Perine – 23 carries, 121 yards, 1 touchdown
- VAN – Ke'Shawn Vaughn – 7 carries, 56 yards

Receiving leaders

- FLA – La'Mical Perine – 4 receptions, 93 yards
- VAN – Ke'Shawn Vaughn – 1 reception, 75 yards, 1 touchdown

Tackling leaders

- FLA – David Reese II – 6 tackles
- VAN – Jordan Griffin – 18 tackles

Overall record	Previous meeting	Previous winner
39–10–2	September 30, 2017	Florida, 38–24

Uniform Combination
Helmet	Jersey	Pants

=== Georgia ===
Florida Gators vs. Georgia Bulldogs – Game summary

Quarter	1	2	3	4	Total
No. 9 Florida	0	7	7	3	17
No. 7 Georgia	10	3	10	13	36

at TIAA Bank Field • Jacksonville, Florida

- Date: October 27, 2018
- Game time: 3:30 p.m.
- Game weather: Temperature: 68 °F (20 °C) • Wind: W at 13 miles per hour (21 km/h) • Weather: Mostly cloudy
- Game attendance: 84,463
- Referee: Matt Loeffler
- TV announcers (CBS): Brad Nessler, Gary Danielson, and Jamie Erdahl
- Boxscore

Game information

First Quarter

- Georgia – Rodrigo Blankenship 21-yard field goal, 8:11
- Georgia – Jeremiah Holloman 16-yard pass from Jake Fromm (Rodrigo Blankenship kick), 6:07

Second Quarter

- Florida – Feleipe Franks 1 yard run (Evan McPherson kick), 9:57
- Georgia – Rodrigo Blankenship 22-yard field goal, 0:02

Third Quarter

- Florida – Freddie Swain 36-yard pass from Feleipe Franks (Evan McPherson kick), 13:35
- Georgia – Jeremiah Holloman 12-yard pass from Jake Fromm (Rodrigo Blankenship kick), 10:33
- Georgia – Rodrigo Blankenship 18-yard field goal, 0:07

Fourth Quarter

- Florida – Evan McPherson 42-yard field goal, 11:12
- Georgia – Terry Godwin 24-yard pass from Jake Fromm, 8:39
- Georgia – D'Andre Swift 33-yard run (Rodrigo Blankenship kick), 4:29

Passing leaders

- FLA – Feleipe Franks – 13/21, 105 yards, 1 touchdown, 1 interception
- UGA – Jake Fromm – 17/24, 240 yards, 3 touchdowns

Rushing leaders

- FLA – La'Mical Perine – 14 carries, 62 yards
- UGA – D'Andre Swift – 12 carries, 104 yards, 1 touchdown

Receiving leaders

- FLA – Freddie Swain – 2 receptions, 38 yards, 1 touchdown
- UGA – Isaac Nauta – 5 receptions, 73 yards

Tackling leaders

- FLA – Vosean Joseph – 13 tackles
- UGA – Monty Rice – 11 tackles

Overall record	Previous meeting	Previous winner
43–50–2 (per Florida); 43–51–2 (per Georgia)	October 28, 2017	Georgia, 42–7

Uniform Combination
Helmet	Jersey	Pants

=== Missouri ===
Missouri Tigers at Florida Gators – Game summary

Quarter	1	2	3	4	Total
Missouri	7	14	14	3	38
No. 13 Florida	3	7	7	0	17

at Ben Hill Griffin Stadium • Gainesville, Florida

- Date: November 3, 2018
- Game time: 4:00 p.m.
- Game weather: Temperature: 68 °F (20 °C) • Wind: NNE at 10 miles per hour (16 km/h) • Weather: Sunny
- Game attendance: 80,017
- Referee: John McDaid
- TV announcers (SEC Network): Tom Hart, Jordan Rodgers, Cole Cubelic
- Boxscore

Game information

First Quarter

- Florida – Evan McPherson 32-yard field goal, 7:18
- Missouri – Larry Rountree III 27-yard run (Tucker McCann kick), 3:46

Second Quarter

- Missouri – Albert Okwuegbunam 22-yard pass from Drew Lock (Tucker McCann kick), 13:12
- Missouri – Damarea Crockett 4-yard run (Tucker McCann kick), 6:06
- Florida – Feleipe Franks 3-yard run (Evan McPherson kick), 1:42

Third Quarter

- Missouri – Kam Scott 41-yard pass from Drew Lock (Evan McPherson kick), 10:02
- Missouri – Emanuel Hall 4-yard pass from Drew Lock (Evan McPherson kick), 5:00
- Florida – Josh Hammond 7-yard pass from Kyle Trask (Evan McPherson kick), 0:20

Fourth Quarter

- Missouri – Tucker McCann 40-yard field goal, 9:08

Passing leaders

- MIZZ – Drew Lock – 24/32, 250 yards, 3 touchdowns
- FLA – Kyle Trask – 10/18, 126 yards, 1 touchdown

Rushing leaders

- MIZZ – Damarea Crockett – 21 carries, 114 yards, 1 touchdown
- FLA – La'Mical Perine – 10 carries, 42 yards

Receiving leaders

- MIZZ – Emanuel Hall – 4 receptions, 77 yards, 1 touchdown
- FLA – Kadarius Toney – 2 receptions, 72 yards

Tackling leaders

- MIZZ – Cale Garrett – 12 tackles
- FLA – David Reese II – 14 tackles

Overall record	Previous meeting	Previous winner
3–4	November 4, 2017	Missouri, 45–16

Uniform Combination
Helmet	Jersey	Pants

=== South Carolina ===
South Carolina Gamecocks at Florida Gators – Game summary

Quarter	1	2	3	4	Total
South Carolina	14	7	10	0	31
No. 19 Florida	0	14	7	14	35

at Ben Hill Griffin Stadium • Gainesville, Florida

- Date: November 10, 2018
- Game time: 12:00 p.m.
- Game weather: Temperature: 68 °F (20 °C) • Wind: N at 8 miles per hour (13 km/h) • Weather: 83% humidity, cloudy
- Game attendance: 82,696
- Referee: David Smith
- TV announcers (ESPN): Dave Pasch, Greg McElroy, Tom Luginbill
- Boxscore

Game information

First Quarter

- South Carolina – Jacob Austin 2-yard pass from Jake Bentley (Parker White kick), 9:17
- South Carolina – Kyle Markway 19-yard pass from Jake Bentley (Parker White kick), 4:51

Second Quarter

- Florida – La'Mical Perine 2-yard run (Evan McPherson kick), 13:46
- Florida – Feleipe Franks 10-yard run (Evan McPherson kick), 8:58
- South carolina – Jake Bentley 1 yard run (Parker White kick), 4:21

Third Quarter

- South Carolina – Parker White 34-yard field goal, 9:19
- South carolina – Rico Dowdle 4-yard run (Parker White kick), 4:41
- Florida – Kadarius Toney 8-yard pass from Feleipe Franks (Evan McPherson kick), 0:56

Fourth Quarter

- Florida – La'Mical Perine 23-yard run (Evan McPherson kick), 11:03
- Florida – Feleipe Franks 1 yard run (Evan McPherson kick), 4:09

Passing leaders

- SCAR – Jake Bentley – 18/28, 239 yards, 2 touchdowns, 1 interception
- FLA – Feleipe Franks – 15/21, 161 yards, 1 touchdown

Rushing leaders

- SCAR – A. J. Turner – 12 carries, 81 yards
- FLA – Jordan Scarlett – 18 carries, 159 yards

Receiving leaders

- SCAR – Deebo Samuel – 4 receptions, 120 yards
- FLA – Josh Hammond – 5 receptions, 35 yards

Tackling leaders

- SCAR – T. J. Brunson – 16 tackles
- FLA – David Reese II – 10 tackles

Overall record	Previous meeting	Previous winner
26–9–3	November 11, 2017	South Carolina, 28–20

Uniform Combination
Helmet	Jersey	Pants

=== Idaho ===
Idaho Vandals at Florida Gators – Game summary

Quarter	1	2	3	4	Total
Idaho	0	0	3	7	10
No. 15 Florida	28	21	7	7	63

at Ben Hill Griffin Stadium • Gainesville, Florida

- Date: November 17, 2018
- Game time: 12:00 p.m.
- Game weather: Temperature: 65 °F (18 °C) • Wind: NE at 6 miles per hour (9.7 km/h) • Weather: Sunny
- Game attendance: 81,467
- Referee: James Carter
- TV announcers (ESPNU): Kevin Brown and Andre Ware
- Boxscore

Game information

First Quarter

- Florida – C. J. Gardner-Johnson 26-yard interception return (Evan McPherson kick), 14:54
- Florida – Feleipe Franks 17-yard run (Evan McPherson kick), 12:46
- Florida – Kyle Pitts 52-yard pass from Feleipe Franks (Evan McPherson kick), 5:30
- Florida – Van Jefferson 3-yard pass from Feleipe Franks (Evan McPherson kick), 1:44

Second Quarter

- Florida – Josh Hammond 21-yard run (Evan McPherson kick), 10:29
- Florida – Tyrie Cleveland 34-yard pass from Feleipe Franks (Evan McPherson kick), 5:22
- Florida – Josh Hammond 8-yard pass from Emory Jones (Jorge Powell kick), 1:50

Third Quarter

- Florida – Dameon Pierce 4-yard pass from Emory Jones (Jorge Powell kick), 6:50
- Idaho – Cade Coffey 38-yard field goal, 1:02

Fourth Quarter

- Florida – Ventrell Miller 82-yard interception return (Jorge Powell kick), 6:43
- Idaho – Jeff Cotton 12-yard pass from Mason Petrino (Cade Coffey kick), 1:47

Passing leaders

- IDA – Mason Petrino – 12/31, 70 yards, 1 touchdown, 2 interceptions
- FLA – Feleipe Franks – 19/27, 274 yards, 3 touchdowns

Rushing leaders

- IDA – Mason Petrino – 12 carries, 87 yards
- FLA – Dameon Pierce – 13 carries, 77 yards

Receiving leaders

- IDA – Jeff Cotton – 3 receptions, 38 yards, 1 touchdown
- FLA – C'yontai Lewis – 3 receptions, 57 yards

Tackling leaders

- IDA – Christian Elliss – 13 tackles
- FLA – James Houston IV – 5 tackles

Overall record	Previous meeting	Previous winner
First meeting

Uniform Combination
Helmet	Jersey	Pants

=== Florida State ===
Florida Gators at Florida State Seminoles – Game summary

Quarter	1	2	3	4	Total
No. 13 Florida	3	10	14	14	41
Florida State	0	7	7	0	14

at Doak Campbell Stadium • Tallahassee, Florida

- Date: November 24, 2018
- Game time: 12:00 p.m.
- Game weather: Temperature: 66 °F (19 °C) • Wind: NW at 6 miles per hour (9.7 km/h) • Weather: 94% humidity, 30% chance of rain
- Game attendance: 71,953
- Referee: Gary Patterson
- TV announcers (ABC): Dave Pasch, Greg McElroy, Tom Luginbill
- Boxscore

Game information

First Quarter

- Florida – Evan McPherson 27-yard field goal, 0:00

Second Quarter

- Florida – La'Mical Perine 74-yard run (Evan McPherson kick), 13:24
- Florida – Evan McPherson 23-yard field goal, 7:35
- Florida State – Cam Akers 15-yard pass from Deondre Francois (Ricky Aguayo kick), 5:25

Third Quarter

- Florida – Josh Hammond 3-yard pass from Feleipe Franks (Evan McPherson kick), 10:53
- Florida – Trevon Grimes – 22-yard pass from Feleipe Franks (Evan McPherson kick), 6:20
- Florida State – Deondre Francois 4-yard run (Ricky Aguayo kick), 4:16

Fourth Quarter

- Florida – Van Jefferson 38-yard pass from Feleipe Franks (Evan McPherson kick), 14:53
- Florida – Jordan Scarlett 9-yard run (Evan McPherson kick), 3:56

Passing leaders

- FLA – Feleipe Franks – 16/26, 254 yards, 3 touchdowns
- FSU – Deondre Francois – 14/29, 154 yards, 1 touchdown, 2 interceptions

Rushing leaders

- FLA – La'Mical Perine – 13 carries, 129 yards, 1 touchdown
- FSU – Jacques Patrick – 10 carries, 52 yards

Receiving leaders

- FLA – Trevon Grimes – 5 receptions, 118 yards, 1 touchdown
- FSU – Tamorrion Terry – 3 receptions, 78 yards

Tackling leaders

- FLA – Vosean Joseph – 8 tackles
- FSU – Jaiden Woodbey – 11 tackles

Overall record	Previous meeting	Previous winner
34–26–2	November 25, 2017	Florida State, 38–22

Uniform Combination
Helmet	Jersey	Pants

=== Michigan (Peach Bowl) ===
Florida Gators vs. Michigan Wolverines – Game summary

Quarter	1	2	3	4	Total
No. 10 Florida	3	10	14	14	41
No. 8 Michigan	7	3	0	5	15

at Mercedes-Benz Stadium • Atlanta, GA

- Date: December 29, 2018
- Game time: 12:00 p.m.
- Game weather: Indoors
- Game attendance: 74,006
- Referee: Mike Defee
- TV announcers (ESPN): Bob Wischusen, Brock Huard, Allison Williams
- Boxscore

Game information

First Quarter

- Florida – Evan McPherson 21-yard field goal, 5:37
- Michigan – Donovan Peoples-Jones 9-yard pass from Shea Patterson (Jake Moody kick), 2:03

Second Quarter

- Florida – Evan McPherson 26-yard field goal, 12:22
- Michigan – Jake Moody 48-yard field goal, 5:56
- Florida – Feleipe Franks 20-yard run (Evan McPherson kick), 2:41

Third Quarter

- Florida – La'Mical Perine 5-yard pass from Feleipe Franks (Evan McPherson kick), 8:06
- Florida – Jordan Scarlett 1 yard run (Evan McPherson kick), 2:34

Fourth Quarter

- Michigan – Jake Moody 26-yard field goal, 12:16
- Florida – La'Mical Perine 53-yard run (Evan McPherson kick), 9:21
- Michigan – Team 20-yard safety, 4:58
- Florida – C. J. Gardner-Johnson 30-yard interception return (Evan McPherson kick), 4:43

Passing leaders

- FLA – Feleipe Franks – 13/23, 173 yards, 1 touchdown
- MICH – Shea Patterson – 22/36, 236 yards, 1 touchdown, 2 interceptions

Rushing leaders

- FLA – La'Mical Perine – 6 carries, 76 yards, 1 touchdown
- MICH – Christian Turner – 7 carries, 32 yards

Receiving leaders

- FLA – Van Jefferson – 4 receptions, 64 yards
- MICH – Nico Collins – 5 receptions, 80 yards

Tackling leaders

- FLA – C. J. Henderson & Jaewon Taylor – 8 tackles
- MICH – Josh Ross – 11 tackles

Overall record	Previous meeting	Previous winner
0–4	September 2, 2017	Michigan, 33–17

Uniform Combination
Helmet	Jersey	Pants

== Personnel ==
=== Roster ===
As of September 23, 2018

2018 Florida Gators roster
Quarterbacks: 5 Emory Jones – Freshman; 11 Kyle Trask – (redshirt) Sophomore; 13 Feleipe Franks – (redshirt) Sophomore; Running backs: 20 Malik Davis – Sophomore; 22 La'Mical Perine – Junior; 24 Iverson Clement – Freshman; 25 Jordan Scarlett – (redshirt) Junior; 27 Dameon Pierce – Freshman; Wide receivers: 8 Trevon Grimes – Sophomore; 9 Dre Massey – (redshirt) Senior; 10 Josh Hammond – Junior; 12 Van Jefferson – (redshirt) Junior; 15 Jacob Copeland – Freshman; 16 Freddie Swain – Junior; 18 Daquon Green – Sophomore; 83 Rick Wells – (redshirt) Sophomore; 89 Tyrie Cleveland – Junior; Tight ends: 14 Lucas Krull – (redshirt) Sophomore; 80 C'yontai Lewis – (redshirt) Senior; 81 Dante Lang – Freshman; 82 Moral Stephens – (redshirt) Senior; 84 Kyle Pitts – Freshman; 88 Kemore Gamble – (redshirt) Freshman; Offensive line: 53 Kavaris Harkless – (redshirt) Senior; 55 Noah Banks – (redshirt) Junior; 56 Jean DeLance – (redshirt) Sophomore; 59 T.J. McCoy – (redshirt) Junior; 61 Brett Heggie – (redshirt) Sophomore; 62 Griffin McDowell – Freshman; 64 Tyler Jordan – Senior; 65 Jawaan Taylor – Junior; 66 Nick Buchanan – (redshirt) Junior; 67 Christopher Bleich – Freshman; 70 Tanner Rowell – (redshirt) Sophomore; 71 Nick Villano – (redshirt) Junior; 72 Stone Forsythe – (redshirt) Sophomore; 73 Martez Ivey – Senior; 74 Fred Johnson – Senior; 75 T.J. Moore – (redshirt) Freshman; 76 Richard Gouraige – Freshman	Defensive line: 17 Zachary Carter – (redshirt) Freshman; 35 Malik Langham – Freshman; 54 Khairi Clark – (redshirt) Senior; 55 Kyree Campbell – Sophomore; 56 Tedarrell Slaton – Sophomore; 77 Antonneous Clayton Sr. – Junior; 91 Marlon Dunlap Jr. – Junior; 92 Jabari Zuniga – (redshirt) Junior; 93 Elijah Conliffe – Sophomore; 95 Adam Shuler – Graduate; 96 CeCe Jefferson – Senior; 98 Luke Ancrum – (redshirt) Junior; 99 Jachai Polite – Junior; Linebackers: 7 Jeremiah Moon – (redshirt) Sophomore; 11 Vosean Joseph – Junior; 28 Kylan Johnson – (redshirt) Junior; 33 David Reese – Junior; 34 Lacedrick Brunson – (redshirt) Freshman; 40 Nick Smith – (redshirt) Freshman; 41 James Houston – (redshirt) Freshman; 44 Rayshad Jackson – (redshirt) Junior; 51 Ventrell Miller – (redshirt) Freshman; 58 Jahim Lawrence – (redshirt) Junior; 90 Andrew Chatfield Jr. – Freshman; Defensive backs: 2 Brad Stewart Jr. – Sophomore; 3 Marco Wilson – Sophomore; 4 David Reese – Freshman; 5 C. J. Henderson – Sophomore; 6 Brian Edwards – Sophomore; 12 C.J. McWilliams – (redshirt) Sophomore; 13 Donovan Stiner – Sophomore; 21 Trey Dean – Freshman; 23 C. J. Gardner-Johnson – Junior; 26 John Huggins – Freshman; 27 Quincy Lenton – (redshirt) Sophomore; 29 Jeawon Taylor – Junior; 31 Shawn Davis – Sophomore	Punters: 43 Tommy Townsend – (redshirt) Junior; 86 Jacob Finn – (redshirt) Sophomore; 97 Jon Gould – (redshirt) Junior; Placekickers: 19 Evan McPherson – Freshman; 71 Chris Howard – (redshirt) Freshman; 98 Jorge Powell – (redshirt) Senior; Long snappers: 41 Ryan Farr – Senior; 48 Brett DioGuardi – (redshirt) Sophomore; 49 Jacob Tilghman – (redshirt) Junior; 50 Marco Ortiz – Freshman; Athletes: 4 Kadarius Toney – Sophomore; 17 Nick Sproles – (redshirt) Sophomore; 19 Jack Ruskell – (redshirt) Freshman; 25 Erik Askeland – (redshirt) Freshman; 27 Joshua Tse – (redshirt) Freshman; 30 Amari Burney – Freshman; 33 Daniel Cross – Freshman; 36 Robert Clay – (redshirt) Junior; 37 Patrick Moorer – (redshirt) Freshman; 37 Brandon Reddick – Graduate; 38 Anthony Giglia – (redshirt) Senior; 38 Nick Oelrich – (redshirt) Sophomore; 39 Brady Walters – (redshirt) Junior; 42 Jaylin Jackson – Freshman; 42 Umstead Sanders – Junior; 43 Glenn Jarriel – (redshirt) Junior; 43 Nicolas Sutton – (redshirt) Sophomore; 44 Garrett Conner – (redshirt) Junior; 45 R.J. Raymond – (redshirt) Senior; 46 Harry Gornto V – (redshirt) Junior; 46 Will Thomas – (redshirt) Sophomore; 47 Austin Perry – (redshirt) Freshman; 47 Isaac Ricks – (redshirt) Freshman; 52 Quaylin Crum – (redshirt) Freshman; 57 Coleman Crozier – Freshman; 59 Danny Weldon – (redshirt) Junior; 60 Houston Underwood – (redshirt) Junior; 63 James Washington - (redshirt) Freshman; 85 Trey Thompson – (redshirt) Freshman; 86 Andres Saldivar – (redshirt) Junior; 87 Dennis Gross – (redshirt) Junior; 93 Moses Gordon III – (redshirt) Junior

- Redshirt
- Injury

=== Coaching staff ===
Name	Position	Joined staff
Dan Mullen	Head coach	2018
Todd Grantham	Defensive coordinator	2018
John Hevesy	Co-offensive Coordinator / offensive line	2018
Billy Gonzales	Co-offensive Coordinator / Wide receivers	2018
Greg Knox	Running backs / Special teams coordinator	2018
Sal Sunseri	Defensive line	2018
Ron English	Safeties	2018
Brian Johnson	Quarterbacks	2018
Larry Scott	Tight ends	2018
Charlton Warren	Cornerbacks	2018
Christian Robinson	Linebackers	2018
Nick Savage	Director of strength and conditioning	2018

=== Recruits ===
The Gators signed a total of 19 recruits.

College recruiting (2018)
Name	Hometown	School	Height	Weight	Commit date
Iverson Clement; RB	Mount Holly, New Jersey	Rancocas Valley Regional High School	5 ft 11 in (1.80 m)	199 lb (90 kg)	Apr 13, 2017
Iverson Clement; RB	Recruit ratings: Scout: Rivals: 247Sports: ESPN:				
Amari Burney; S	Clearwater, Florida	Calvary Christian High School	6 ft 1 in (1.85 m)	215 lb (98 kg)	Jun 1, 2017
Amari Burney; S	Recruit ratings: Scout: Rivals: 247Sports: ESPN:				
Kyle Pitts; TE	Warminster, Pennsylvania	Archbishop Wood High School	6 ft 4 in (1.93 m)	224 lb (102 kg)	Jul 20, 2017
Kyle Pitts; TE	Recruit ratings: Scout: Rivals: 247Sports: ESPN:				
Dante Lang; TE	Boca Raton, Florida	Boca Raton Community High School	6 ft 5 in (1.96 m)	220 lb (100 kg)	Jul 21, 2017
Dante Lang; TE	Recruit ratings: Scout: Rivals: 247Sports: ESPN:				
Randy Russell; S	Miami, Florida	Miami Carol City High School	5 ft 10 in (1.78 m)	180 lb (82 kg)	Jul 22, 2017
Randy Russell; S	Recruit ratings: Scout: Rivals: 247Sports: ESPN:				
David Reese; LB	Fort Pierce, Florida	Vero Beach High School	6 ft 2 in (1.88 m)	213 lb (97 kg)	Jul 29, 2017
David Reese; LB	Recruit ratings: Scout: Rivals: 247Sports: ESPN:				
Dameon Pierce; RB	Bainbridge, Georgia	Bainbridge High School	5 ft 11 in (1.80 m)	205 lb (93 kg)	Aug 6, 2017
Dameon Pierce; RB	Recruit ratings: Scout: Rivals: 247Sports: ESPN:				
Richard Gouraige; OT	Tampa, Florida	Cambridge Christian School	6 ft 5 in (1.96 m)	271 lb (123 kg)	Oct 20, 2017
Richard Gouraige; OT	Recruit ratings: Scout: Rivals: 247Sports: ESPN:				
Chris Bleich; OT	Plymouth, Pennsylvania	Wyoming Valley West High School	6 ft 6 in (1.98 m)	305 lb (138 kg)	Nov 29, 2017
Chris Bleich; OT	Recruit ratings: Scout: Rivals: 247Sports: ESPN:				
Evan McPherson; K	Fort Payne, Alabama	Fort Payne High School	6 ft 0 in (1.83 m)	165 lb (75 kg)	Dec 10, 2017
Evan McPherson; K	Recruit ratings: Scout: Rivals: 247Sports: ESPN:				
John Huggins; S	Daytona Beach, Florida	Mainland High School	6 ft 0 in (1.83 m)	200 lb (91 kg)	Dec 17, 2017
John Huggins; S	Recruit ratings: Scout: Rivals: 247Sports: ESPN:				
Noah Banks; OT	Pensacola, Florida	Iowa Western Community College	6 ft 7 in (2.01 m)	305 lb (138 kg)	Dec 19, 2017
Noah Banks; OT	Recruit ratings: Scout: Rivals: 247Sports: ESPN:				
Trey Dean; S	Hampton, Georgia	Dutchtown High School	6 ft 2 in (1.88 m)	180 lb (82 kg)	Dec 20, 2017
Trey Dean; S	Recruit ratings: Scout: Rivals: 247Sports: ESPN:				
Emory Jones; QB	Franklin, Georgia	Heard County High School	6 ft 3 in (1.91 m)	196 lb (89 kg)	Dec 20, 2017
Emory Jones; QB	Recruit ratings: Scout: Rivals: 247Sports: ESPN:				
Justin Watkins; WR	Clermont, Florida	East Ridge High School	5 ft 11 in (1.80 m)	172 lb (78 kg)	Jan 20, 2018
Justin Watkins; WR	Recruit ratings: Scout: Rivals: 247Sports: ESPN:				
Griffin McDowell; C	Leesburg, Georgia	Lee County High School	6 ft 4 in (1.93 m)	280 lb (130 kg)	Jan 30, 2018
Griffin McDowell; C	Recruit ratings: Scout: Rivals: 247Sports:				
Andrew Chatfield; LB	Plantation, Florida	American Heritage School	6 ft 2 in (1.88 m)	221 lb (100 kg)	Feb 7, 2018
Andrew Chatfield; LB	Recruit ratings: Scout: Rivals: 247Sports: ESPN:				
Malik Langham; DE	Huntsville, Alabama	Lee High School	6 ft 5 in (1.96 m)	255 lb (116 kg)	Feb 7, 2018
Malik Langham; DE	Recruit ratings: Scout: Rivals: 247Sports: ESPN:				
Jacob Copeland; WR	Pensacola, Florida	Escambia High School	6 ft 0 in (1.83 m)	192 lb (87 kg)	Feb 7, 2018
Jacob Copeland; WR	Recruit ratings: Scout: Rivals: 247Sports: ESPN:				
Overall recruit ranking:
Note: In many cases, Scout, Rivals, 247Sports, On3, and ESPN may conflict in their listings of height and weight.; In these cases, the average was taken. ESPN grades are on a 100-point scale.; Sources: "Florida Football Commitments". Rivals.; "2018 Team Ranking". Rivals.com.

== Players drafted into the NFL ==
Round	Pick	Player	Position	NFL club
2	35	Jawaan Taylor	OT	Jacksonville Jaguars
3	68	Jachai Polite	OLB	New York Jets
4	105	C. J. Gardner-Johnson	S	New Orleans Saints
5	147	Vosean Joseph	LB	Buffalo Bills
5	154	Jordan Scarlett	RB	Carolina Panthers
