= 2017 Florida Gators football team =

American college football season

2017 Florida Gators football
- Conference: Southeastern Conference
- Eastern Division
- Record: 4–7 (3–5 SEC)
- Head coach: Jim McElwain (3rd season; first 7 games); Randy Shannon (interim; remainder of season)
- Offensive coordinator: Doug Nussmeier (3rd season)
- Offensive scheme: Multiple
- Defensive coordinator: Randy Shannon (1st season)
- Co-defensive coordinator: Chris Rumph (1st season)
- Base defense: 4–3
- Home stadium: Ben Hill Griffin Stadium

2017 Southeastern Conference football standings
	Conf.			Overall
Team	W		L	W		L
Eastern Division
No. 2 Georgia x$^	7	–	1	13	–	2
South Carolina	5	–	3	9	–	4
Kentucky	4	–	4	7	–	6
Missouri	4	–	4	7	–	6
Florida	3	–	5	4	–	7
Vanderbilt	1	–	7	5	–	7
Tennessee	0	–	8	4	–	8
Western Division
No. 10 Auburn xy	7	–	1	10	–	4
No. 1 Alabama x#^	7	–	1	13	–	1
No. 18 LSU	6	–	2	9	–	4
No. 19 Mississippi State	4	–	4	9	–	4
Texas A&M	4	–	4	7	–	6
Ole Miss*	3	–	5	6	–	6
Arkansas	1	–	7	4	–	8
Championship: Georgia 28, Auburn 7
# – College Football Playoff champion; ^ – College Football Playoff participant; $ – Conference champion; x – Division champion/co-champions; y – Championship game participant; * Ole Miss ineligible for postseason due to NCAA sanctions; Rankings from AP Poll

The 2017 Florida Gators football team represented the University of Florida in the 2017 NCAA Division I FBS football season. The Gators played their home games at Ben Hill Griffin Stadium in Gainesville, Florida. Florida played as a member of the Eastern Division of the Southeastern Conference (SEC). They were led by third-year head coach Jim McElwain until his dismissal on October 28, after which defensive coordinator Randy Shannon served as the interim head coach until the end of the season.

Florida finished with a 4–7 record overall and were 3–5 in SEC play, good for fifth place in the Eastern Division. It was the program's second losing season since 1979.

== Spring Game ==
The spring game, dubbed the Orange and Blue Debut, took place on April 7, in Gainesville.

Date	Time	Spring Game	Site	TV	Result	Attendance
April 7	7:30 p.m.	Orange vs. Blue	Ben Hill Griffin Stadium • Gainesville, FL	SECN	Orange 31–0	48,000

== Schedule ==
The Gators' 2017 schedule consisted of 6 home games, 3 away games, and 2 neutral site games in the regular season. The Gators hosted SEC opponents Tennessee, Vanderbilt, LSU, and Texas A&M. They traveled to Kentucky, Missouri, and South Carolina. They faced Georgia at a neutral site.

Florida's non-conference schedule consisted of two home games: UAB and their rival Florida State. A third was scheduled for Sep 9 vs Northern Colorado, but was canceled due to inclement weather caused by Hurricane Irma. The season was opened against Michigan in the Advocare Classic.

Date	Time	Opponent	Rank	Site	TV	Result	Attendance
September 2	3:30 p.m.	vs. No. 11 Michigan*	No. 17	AT&T Stadium; Arlington, TX (Advocare Classic / SEC Nation)	ABC	L 17–33	75,802
September 16	3:30 p.m.	No. 23 Tennessee	No. 24	Ben Hill Griffin Stadium; Gainesville, FL (rivalry)	CBS	W 26–20	87,736
September 23	7:30 p.m.	at Kentucky	No. 20	Commonwealth Stadium; Lexington, KY (rivalry)	SECN	W 28–27	62,945
September 30	12:00 p.m.	Vanderbilt	No. 21	Ben Hill Griffin Stadium; Gainesville, FL	ESPN	W 38–24	84,478
October 7	3:30 p.m.	LSU^{†}	No. 21	Ben Hill Griffin Stadium; Gainesville, FL (rivalry / SEC Nation)	CBS	L 16–17	88,247
October 14	7:00 p.m.	Texas A&M		Ben Hill Griffin Stadium; Gainesville, FL	ESPN2	L 17–19	86,114
October 28	3:30 p.m.	vs. No. 3 Georgia		EverBank Field; Jacksonville, FL (rivalry / SEC Nation)	CBS	L 7–42	84,107
November 4	12:00 p.m.	at Missouri		Faurot Field; Columbia, MO	ESPN2	L 16–45	49,154
November 11	12:00 p.m.	at South Carolina		Williams-Brice Stadium; Columbia, SC	CBS	L 20–28	79,727
November 18	4:00 p.m.	UAB*		Ben Hill Griffin Stadium; Gainesville, FL	SECN	W 36–7	84,649
November 25	12:00 p.m.	Florida State*		Ben Hill Griffin Stadium; Gainesville, FL (rivalry)	ESPN	L 22–38	89,066
*Non-conference game; ^{†}Homecoming; Rankings from Coaches' Poll released prior to the game

^{^[a]}The game between Florida and Northern Colorado was originally scheduled for September 9 at 7:30 p.m. On the Wednesday before the game, the kickoff time was moved up to noon, as forecasts for Hurricane Irma had the storm approaching the east coast of Florida on Sunday. On Thursday, updated forecast tracks (correctly) predicted that Irma would move up the middle of the Florida peninsula as a major hurricane, prompting both schools to agree to cancel the game altogether due to safety and traffic concerns. This cancellation marked the third time in four seasons that Florida had to cancel or move a home game due to inclement weather and the second season in a row in which a scheduled home game was affected by the threat of a hurricane.

Schedule Source

== Rankings ==
Ranking movements Legend: ██ Increase in ranking ██ Decrease in ranking — = Not ranked RV = Received votes
	Week															
Poll	Pre	1	2	3	4	5	6	7	8	9	10	11	12	13	14	Final
AP	17	22	24	20	21	21	RV	—	—	—	—	—	—	—	—	—
Coaches	16	24	25	22	20	20	RV	RV	RV	—	—	—	—	—	—	—
CFP	Not released									—	—	—	—	—	—	Not released

== Game summaries ==
=== No.11 Michigan ===
No.11 Michigan Wolverines vs. No. 17 Florida Gators – Game summary

Quarter	1	2	3	4	Total
No. 11 Michigan	10	3	13	7	33
No. 17 Florida	3	14	0	0	17

at AT&T Stadium • Arlington, Texas

- Date: September 2, 2017
- Game time: 3:41 p.m.
- Game weather: Game indoors
- Game attendance: 75,802
- Referee: Brad Van Vark
- TV announcers (ABC): Joe Tessitore, Todd Blackledge and Holly Rowe
- Boxscore

Game information

First Quarter

- Florida – Eddy Piñeiro 46-yard field goal, 12:26
- Michigan – Quinn Nordin 25-yard field goal, 5:27
- Michigan – Tarik Black 46-yard pass from Wilton Speight (Quinn Nordin kick), 3:01

Second Quarter

- Florida – Duke Dawson 48-yard interception return (Eddy Piñeiro kick), 12:19
- Florida – C. J. Henderson 41-yard interception return (Eddy Piñeiro kick), 10:50
- Michigan – Nordin Quinn 55-yard field goal, 4:20

Third Quarter

- Michigan – Karan Higdon 3-yard run (Quinn Nordin kick), 11:53
- Michigan – Quinn Nordin 30-yard field goal, 11:05
- Michigan – Quinn Nordin 50-yard field goal, 9:00

Fourth Quarter

- Michigan – Noah Forbush 0-yard fumble recovery (Quinn Nordin kick), 1:37

Passing leaders

- MICH – Wilton Speight – 11/25, 181 yards, 1 touchdown, 2 interceptions
- FLA – Malik Zaire – 9/17, 106 yards

Rushing leaders

- MICH – Ty Isaac – 11 carries, 114 yards
- FLA – Mark Thompson – 5 carries, 13 yards

Receiving leaders

- MICH – Tarik Black – 2 receptions, 83 yards, 1 touchdown
- FLA – Josh Hammond – 3 touchdowns, 71 yards

Tackling leaders

- MICH – Devin Bush Jr. – 7 tackles
- FLA – David Reese – 11 tackles

Overall record	Previous meeting	Previous winner
0–3	January 1, 2016	Michigan, 41–7

Uniform Combination*
Helmet	Jersey	Pants

- Special "color rush" uniforms

=== No.23 Tennessee ===
No.23 Tennessee Volunteers at No.24 Florida Gators – Game summary

Quarter	1	2	3	4	Total
No. 23 Tennessee	0	3	0	17	20
No. 24 Florida	3	3	0	20	26

at Ben Hill Griffin Stadium • Gainesville, Florida

- Date: September 16, 2017
- Game time: 3:40 p.m.
- Game weather: Temperature: 85 °F (29 °C) • Wind: NE at 6 miles per hour (9.7 km/h) • Weather: Partly cloudy, 70% humidity
- Game attendance: 87,736
- Referee: John McDaid
- TV announcers (CBS): Brad Nessler, Gary Danielson and Allie LaForce
- Boxscore

Game information

First Quarter

- Florida – Eddy Piñeiro 26-yard field goal, 7:39

Second Quarter

- Florida – Eddy Piñeiro 41-yard field goal, 8:11
- Tennessee – Brent Cimaglia – 51-yard field goal, 2:58

Fourth Quarter

- Florida – C. J. Henderson 16-yard interception return (Eddy Piñeiro kick), 14:23
- Tennessee – John Kelly 34-yard run (Aaron Medley kick), 8:36
- Florida – Brandon Powell 5-yard pass from Feleipe Franks (Eddy Piñeiro kick), 5:13
- Tennessee – Ethan Wolf 28-yard pass from Quinten Dormady (Aaron Medley kick), 4:43
- Tennessee – Aaron Medley 27-yard field goal, 0:50
- Florida – Tyrie Cleveland 63-yard pass from Feleipe Franks, 0:00

Passing leaders

- TENN – Quinten Dormady – 21/39, 259 yards, 1 touchdown, 3 interceptions
- FLA – Feleipe Franks – 18/28, 212 yards, 2 touchdowns, 1 interception

Rushing leaders

- TENN – John Kelly – 19 carries, 141 yards, 1 touchdown
- FLA – Malik Davis – 4 carries, 94 yards

Receiving leaders

- TENN – John Kelly – 6 receptions, 96 yards
- FLA – Tyrie Cleveland – 5 receptions, 93 yards, 1 touchdown

Tackling leaders

- TENN – Rashaan Gaulden – 10 tackles
- FLA – David Reese and Marco Wilson – 7 tackles

Overall record	Previous meeting	Previous winner
26–20	September 24, 2016	Tennessee, 38–28

With 0:09 seconds left in the fourth quarter quarterback Feleipe Franks threw a 63-yard hail mary to wide receiver Tyrie Cleveland for the win.

Uniform Combination
Helmet	Jersey	Pants

=== Kentucky ===
No.20 Florida Gators at Kentucky Wildcats – Game summary

Quarter	1	2	3	4	Total
No. 20 Florida	0	14	0	14	28
Kentucky	7	7	10	3	27

at Kroger Field • Lexington, Kentucky

- Date: September 23, 2017
- Game time: 7:30 p.m.
- Game weather: Temperature: 80 °F (27 °C) • Wind: NE at 6 miles per hour (9.7 km/h) • Weather: Clear
- Game attendance: 62,945
- Referee: James Carter
- TV announcers (SEC Network): Tom Hart, Jordan Rodgers and Cole Cubelic
- Boxscore

Game information

First Quarter

- Kentucky – Blake Bone 14-yard pass from Stephen Johnson (Austin MacGinnis kick), 5:06

Second Quarter

- Florida – Kadarius Toney 36-yard run (Eddy Piñeiro kick), 14:16
- Kentucky – Garrett Johnson 9-yard pass from Stephen Johnson (Austin MacGinnis kick), 7:24
- Florida – Tyrie Cleveland 45-yard pass from Feleipe Franks (Eddy Piñeiro kick), 3:16

Third Quarter

- Kentucky – C. J. Conrad 23-yard pass from Stephen Johnson (Austin MacGinnis kick), 12:11
- Kentucky – Austin MacGinnis 42-yard field goal, 5:54

Fourth Quarter

- Kentucky – Austin MacGinnis 50-yard field goal, 11:33
- Florida – Brandon Powell 6-yard run (Eddy Piñeiro kick), 7:58
- Florida – Freddie Swain 5-yard pass from Luke Del Rio (Eddy Piñeiro kick), 0:43

Passing leaders

- FLA – Feleipe Franks – 7/12, 85 yards, 1 touchdown
- KEN – Stephen Johnson – 17/25, 196 yards, 3 touchdowns

Rushing leaders

- FLA – Malik Davis – 21 carries, 93 yards
- KEN – Sihiem King – 5 carries, 63 yards

Receiving leaders

- FLA – Tyrie Cleveland – 4 receptions, 110 yards, 1 touchdown
- KEN – Garrett Johnson – 4 receptions, 56 yards, 1 touchdown

Tackling leaders

- FLA – David Reese – 8 tackles
- KEN – Mike Edwards – 11 tackles

Overall record	Previous meeting	Previous winner
50–17	September 10, 2016	Florida, 45–7

Uniform Combination
Helmet	Jersey	Pants

=== Vanderbilt ===
Vanderbilt Commodores at No.21 Florida Gators – Game summary

Quarter	1	2	3	4	Total
Vanderbilt	7	10	0	7	24
No. 21 Florida	7	10	7	14	38

at Ben Hill Griffin Stadium • Gainesville, Florida

- Date: September 30, 2017
- Game time: 12:00 p.m.
- Game weather: Temperature: 75 °F (24 °C) • Wind: Northeast at 10 miles per hour (16 km/h) • Weather: Showers, 90% humidity
- Game attendance: 84,478
- Referee: Matt Austin
- TV announcers (ESPN): Dave Pasch, Greg McElroy and Tom Luginbill
- Boxscore

Game information

First Quarter

- Florida – La'Mical Perine 1 yard run (Eddy Piñeiro kick), 6:12
- Vanderbilt – Kalija Lipscomb 13-yard pass from Kyle Shurmur (Tommy Openshaw kick), 2:27

Second Quarter

- Florida – La'Mical Perine 13-yard run (Eddy Piñeiro kick), 10:03
- Vanderbilt – Caleb Scott 12-yard pass from Kyle Shurmur (Tommy Openshaw kick), 6:51
- Vanderbilt – Tommy Openshaw 42-yard field goal, 0:43
- Florida – Eddy Piñeiro 21-yard field goal, 0:00

Third Quarter

- Florida – Malik Davis 1 yard run (Eddy Piñeiro kick), 6:56

Fourth Quarter

- Florida – La'Mical Perine 1 yard run (Eddy Piñeiro kick), 14:18
- Vanderbilt – Nathan Marcus 7-yard pass from Kyle Shurmur (Tommy Openshaw kick), 3:14
- Florida – Malik Davis 39-yard run (Eddy Piñeiro kick), 1:42

Passing leaders

- VAN – Kyle Shurmur – 18/40, 264 yards, 3 touchdowns
- FLA – Feleipe Franks – 10/14, 185 yards

Rushing leaders

- VAN – Ralph Webb – 11 carries, 29 yards
- FLA – Malik Davis – 17 carries, 124 yards, 2 touchdowns

Receiving leaders

- VAN – C. J. Duncan – 5 receptions, 75 yards
- FLA – Tyrie Cleveland – 2 receptions, 67 yards

Tackling leaders

- VAN – Oren Burks – 15 tackles
- FLA – C. J. Gardner-Johnson, David Reese, Nick Washington – 6 tackles

Overall record	Previous meeting	Previous winner
38–10–2	October 10, 2016	Florida, 13–6

Uniform Combination
Helmet	Jersey	Pants

=== LSU ===
LSU Tigers at No.21 Florida Gators – Game summary

Quarter	1	2	3	4	Total
LSU	7	3	7	0	17
No. 21 Florida	0	3	13	0	16

at Ben Hill Griffin Stadium • Gainesville, Florida

- Date: October 7, 2017
- Game time: 3:30 p.m.
- Game attendance: 88,247
- Referee: Matt Loeffler
- TV announcers (CBS): Brad Nessler, Gary Danielson and Allie LaForce

Overall record	Previous meeting	Previous winner
32–28–3	November 19, 2016	Florida, 16–10

Uniform Combination
Helmet	Jersey	Pants

=== Texas A&M ===
Texas A&M Aggies at Florida Gators – Game summary

Quarter	1	2	3	4	Total
Texas A&M	3	0	7	9	19
Florida	3	7	0	7	17

at Ben Hill Griffin Stadium • Gainesville, Florida

- Date: October 14, 2017
- Game time: 7:00 p.m.
- Game attendance: 86,114
- Referee: Hubert Owens
- TV announcers (ESPN2): Beth Mowins, Anthony Becht & Rocky Boiman

Overall record	Previous meeting	Previous winner
2–1	September 8, 2012	Florida, 20–17

Uniform Combination*
Helmet	Jersey	Pants

- Special "alligator skin" uniforms

=== No.3 Georgia ===
No.3 Georgia Bulldogs vs. Florida Gators – Game summary

Quarter	1	2	3	4	Total
No. 3 Georgia	21	0	14	7	42
Florida	0	0	0	7	7

at EverBank Field • Jacksonville, Florida

- Date: October 28, 2017
- Game time: 3:30 p.m.
- Game attendance: 84,107
- Referee: James Carter
- TV announcers (CBS): Brad Nessler, Gary Danielson and Allie LaForce

Overall record	Previous meeting	Previous winner
43–49–2 (per Florida); 43–50–2 (per Georgia)	October 29, 2016	Florida, 24–10

Following the game, it was announced that Florida and Head Coach Jim McElwain would be parting ways and Defensive coordinator Randy Shannon was to be promoted to interim head coach for the remainder of the season.

Uniform Combination
Helmet	Jersey	Pants

=== Missouri ===
Florida Gators at Missouri Tigers – Game summary

Quarter	1	2	3	4	Total
Florida	0	6	3	7	16
Missouri	7	21	7	10	45

at Faurot Field • Columbia, Missouri

- Date: November 4, 2017
- Game time: 12:00 p.m.
- Game attendance: 49,154
- TV announcers (ESPN2): Jason Benetti, Kelly Stouffer & Kris Budden

Overall record	Previous meeting	Previous winner
3–3	October 15, 2016	Florida, 40–14

Uniform Combination
Helmet	Jersey	Pants

=== South Carolina ===
Florida Gators at South Carolina Gamecocks – Game summary

Quarter	1	2	3	4	Total
Florida	0	13	0	7	20
South Carolina	14	7	7	0	28

at Williams-Brice Stadium • Columbia, South Carolina

- Date: November 11, 2017
- Game time: 12:00 p.m.
- Game attendance: 79,727

Overall record	Previous meeting	Previous winner
26–8–3	November 12, 2017	Florida, 20–7

Uniform Combination
Helmet	Jersey	Pants

=== UAB ===
UAB Blazers at Florida Gators – Game summary

Quarter	1	2	3	4	Total
UAB	0	0	0	7	7
Florida	6	13	14	3	36

at Ben Hill Griffin Stadium • Gainesville, Florida

- Date: November 18, 2017
- Game time: 4:00 p.m.
- Game attendance: 84,649

Overall record	Previous meeting	Previous winner
2–0	September 10, 2010	Florida, 39–0

Uniform Combination
Helmet	Jersey	Pants

=== Florida State ===
Florida State Seminoles at Florida Gators – Game summary

Quarter	1	2	3	4	Total
Florida State	7	17	0	14	38
Florida	7	6	3	6	22

at Ben Hill Griffin Stadium • Gainesville, Florida

- Date: November 25, 2017
- Game time: 12:00 p.m.
- Game attendance: 89,066

Overall record	Previous meeting	Previous winner
34–25–2	November 26, 2016	Florida State, 31–13

Uniform Combination
Helmet	Jersey	Pants

== Personnel ==
=== Roster ===
As of November 8, 2017

2017 Florida Gators roster
Quarterbacks: 8 Malik Zaire – (redshirt) senior; 11 Kyle Trask – (redshirt) Freshman; 12 Jake Allen – Freshman; 13 Feleipe Franks – (redshirt) freshman; 14 Luke Del Rio – (redshirt) Junior; 29 Jack Ruskell – freshman; 42 Nick Sproles – (redshirt) freshman; Running backs: 20 Malik Davis – Freshman; 22 La'Mical Perine – Sophomore; 24 Mark Thompson– (redshirt) senior; 25 Jordan Scarlett – ^{SUS} Junior; 32 Adarius Lemons – freshman; 33 Tyriek Hopkins – (redshirt) sophomore; Wide receivers: 4 Brandon Powell – senior; 9 Dre Massey – senior; 10 Josh Hammond – sophomore; 16 Freddie Swain – sophomore; 18 Daquon Green – freshman; 31 Anthony Gigla – sophomore; 39 Jacob Mesenger – freshman; 43 Glenn Jarriel – (redshirt) sophomore; 44 Tucker Nordman – (redshirt) sophomore; 45 Charles Nordman – (redshirt) sophomore; 81 Antonio Callaway – ^{SUS} Junior; 83 Rick Wells – (redshirt) ^{SUS} Freshman; 85 James Robinson – Freshman; 87 Kalif Jackson – (redshirt) sophomore; 89 Tyrie Cleveland – sophomore; Tight ends: 16 Brian Fallace – (redshirt) junior; 30 DeAndre Goolsby – senior; 39 Ryan Ferguson – (redshirt) junior; 46 Harry Gornto V – (redshirt) sophomore; 80 C'yontai Lewis – (redshirt) junior; 82 Moral Stephens – (redshirt) junior; 88 Kemore Gamble – freshman; Punters: 19 Johnny Townsend – (redshirt) senior; 86 Jacob Finn – freshman; 88 Tommy Townsend – (redshirt) freshman; 97 Jon Gould – (redshirt) sophomore	Offensive line: 51 Antonio Riles – (redshirt) senior; 53 Kavaris Harkless – (redshirt) junior; 59 T.J. McCoy – (redshirt) sophomore; 61 Brett Heggie – (redshirt) Freshman; 64 Tyler Jordan – junior; 65 Jawaan Taylor – sophomore; 66 Nick Buchanan – (redshirt) sophomore; 69 Marcus Givens – (redshirt) sophomore; 70 Tanner Rowell – (redshirt) freshman; 71 Nick Villano – (redshirt) sophomore; 72 Stone Forsythe – (redshirt) freshman; 73 Martez Ivey – (redshirt) junior; 74 Fred Johnson – (redshirt) sophomore; 75 TJ Moore – freshman; 76 Kadeem Telfort – ^{SUS} Freshman; 77 Andrew Mike – (redshirt) junior; 78 Ricardo Benalcazar – senior; 79 Dallas Bruch – (redshirt) freshman; Defensive line: 17 Jordan Sherit – (redshirt) senior; 42 Jordan Smith – (redshirt) ^{SUS} Freshman; 54 Khairi Clark – (redshirt) junior; 55 Kyree Campbell – freshman; 56 Tedarrell Slaton – freshman; 57 Elijah Conliffe – freshman; 68 Richerd Desir-Jones – (redshirt) ^{SUS} Sophomore; 90 Antonneous Clayton – sophomore; 92 Jabari Zuniga – (redshirt) sophomore; 93 Taven Bryan – (redshirt) junior; 94 Zachary Carter – freshman; 95 Keivonnis Davis – ^{SUS} Junior; 96 CeCe Jefferson – junior; 97 Justus Reed – (redshirt) sophomore; 98 Luke Ancrum – (redshirt) sophomore; 99 Jachai Polite – Sophomore; Placekickers: 15 Eddy Piñeiro – (redshirt) junior; 79 Daniel Justino – (redshirt) freshman; 98 Jorge Powell – (redshirt) junior	Linebackers: 11 Vosean Joseph – sophomore; 28 Kylan Johnson – (redshirt) Sophomore; 33 David Reese – sophomore; 34 Lacedrick Brunson – freshman; 40 Nick Smith – Freshman; 41 James Houston – ^{SUS} Freshman; 43 Cristian Garcia – (redshirt) senior; 44 Rayshad Jackson – (redshirt) sophomore; 45 R.J. Raymond – (redshirt) junior; 46 Will Thomas – (redshirt) freshman; 50 Jeremiah Moon – sophomore; 51 Ventrell Miller – ^{SUS} Freshman; 53 Brendan Ackerman – freshman; 58 Jahim Lawrence – (redshirt) sophomore; 59 Danny Weldon – (redshirt) freshman; 84 Camrin Knight – (redshirt) sophomore; Defensive backs: 2 Brad Stewart – freshman; 3 Marco Wilson – freshman; 5 C. J. Henderson – freshman; 6 Brian Edwards – freshman; 7 Duke Dawson – senior; 8 Nick Washington – (redshirt) Senior; 12 Christopher McWilliams – (redshirt) Freshman; 13 Donovan Stiner – freshman; 14 Chris Williamson – junior; 21 McArthur Burnett – (redshirt) freshman; 23 C. J. Gardner-Johnson – sophomore; 25 Brady Walters – (redshirt) junior; 26 Marcell Harris – (redshirt) Senior; 27 Quincy Lenton – (redshirt) Freshman; 29 Jeawon Taylor – sophomore; 30 Garrett Stephens – (redshirt) Senior; 31 Shawn Davis – freshman; 35 Joseph Putu – senior; 36 Eddie Giles – (redshirt) junior; 38 Nick Oelrich – (redshirt) freshman; 47 Austin Perry – freshman; 48 Edwitch Merisier – (redshirt) freshman; 49 Cameron Town – (redshirt) junior; Long snappers: 41 Ryan Farr – junior; 48 Brett DioGuardi – (redshirt) freshman; 49 Jacob Tilghman – (redshirt) sophomore; Athlete: 17 Kadarius Toney – Freshman

- Redshirt
- Injury
- ^{SUS} Suspension

=== Coaching staff ===
Name	Position	Joined staff
Jim McElwain	Head coach (dismissed Oct 29)	2015
Randy Shannon	Defensive coordinator / Interim head coach (after Oct 29)	2015
Doug Nussmeier	Offensive coordinator / quarterbacks	2015
Chris Rumph	Defensive line / Interim defensive coordinator (after Oct 29)	2015
Robb Akey	Defensive line (after Oct 29)	2017
Greg Nord	Special teams coordinator / Tight Ends	2015
Brad Davis	offensive line	2017
Ja'Juan Seider	Running Backs	2017
Kerry Dixon II	Wide receivers	2015
Tim Skipper	Linebackers	2015
Corey Bell	Defensive Backs	2017
Mike Kent	Director of Strength & Conditioning	2015

=== Recruiting class ===
College recruiting (2017)
Name	Hometown	School	Height	Weight	40^{‡}	Commit date
Kadarius Toney; ATH	Eight Mile, Alabama	Blount HS	6 ft 0 in (1.83 m)	177 lb (80 kg)	—	Enrolled January 4, 2017
Kadarius Toney; ATH	Recruit ratings: 247Sports: ESPN:					
Kadeem Telfort; OT	Miami, Florida	Booker T. Washington HS	6 ft 7 in (2.01 m)	300 lb (140 kg)	—	Enrolled January 5, 2017
Kadeem Telfort; OT	Recruit ratings: 247Sports: ESPN:					
James Houston IV; OLB	Fort Lauderdale, Florida	American Heritage HS	6 ft 1 in (1.85 m)	225 lb (102 kg)	—	Enrolled January 8, 2017
James Houston IV; OLB	Recruit ratings: 247Sports: ESPN:					
Kemore Gamble; TE	Miami, Florida	Miami Southridge HS	6 ft 4 in (1.93 m)	216 lb (98 kg)	—	Enrolled January 4, 2017
Kemore Gamble; TE	Recruit ratings: 247Sports: ESPN:					
Kyree Campbell; DT	Kingston, Pennsylvania	Wyoming Seminary Prep School	6 ft 4 in (1.93 m)	320 lb (150 kg)	—	Enrolled January 4, 2017
Kyree Campbell; DT	Recruit ratings: 247Sports: ESPN:					
Marco Wilson; CB	Fort Lauderdale, Florida	American Heritage HS	6 ft 0 in (1.83 m)	180 lb (82 kg)	—	Signed February 1, 2017
Marco Wilson; CB	Recruit ratings: 247Sports: ESPN:					
Jake Allen; QB	Fort Lauderdale, Florida	St. Thomas Aquinas HS	6 ft 3 in (1.91 m)	200 lb (91 kg)	—	Signed February 1, 2017
Jake Allen; QB	Recruit ratings: 247Sports: ESPN:					
Daquon Green; WR	Tampa, Florida	Tampa Bay Tech HS	6 ft 1 in (1.85 m)	185 lb (84 kg)	—	Signed February 1, 2017
Daquon Green; WR	Recruit ratings: 247Sports: ESPN:					
Donovan Stiner; CB	Bellaire, Texas	Bellaire HS	6 ft 2 in (1.88 m)	185 lb (84 kg)	—	Signed February 1, 2017
Donovan Stiner; CB	Recruit ratings: 247Sports: ESPN:					
Ventrell Miller; LB	Lakeland, Florida	Kathleen HS	6 ft 0 in (1.83 m)	227 lb (103 kg)	—	Signed February 1, 2017
Ventrell Miller; LB	Recruit ratings: 247Sports: ESPN:					
Zachary Carter; DE	Tampa, Florida	Hillsborough HS	6 ft 5 in (1.96 m)	250 lb (110 kg)	—	Signed February 1, 2017
Zachary Carter; DE	Recruit ratings: 247Sports: ESPN:					
Malik Davis; TB	Tampa, Florida	Jesuit Tech HS	5 ft 11 in (1.80 m)	190 lb (86 kg)	—	Signed February 1, 2017
Malik Davis; TB	Recruit ratings: 247Sports: ESPN:					
Brad Stewart; CB	New Orleans, Louisiana	McDonogh 35 HS	6 ft 0 in (1.83 m)	194 lb (88 kg)	—	Signed February 1, 2017
Brad Stewart; CB	Recruit ratings: 247Sports: ESPN:					
T.J. Moore; OT	Charlotte, North Carolina	Mallard Creek HS	6 ft 6 in (1.98 m)	290 lb (130 kg)	—	Signed February 1, 2017
T.J. Moore; OT	Recruit ratings: 247Sports: ESPN:					
Lacedrick Brunson; OLB	Miami, Florida	Miami Jackson HS	6 ft 2 in (1.88 m)	210 lb (95 kg)	—	Commit February 1, 2017
Lacedrick Brunson; OLB	Recruit ratings: 247Sports: ESPN:					
Tedarrell Slaton; OG	Fort Lauderdale, Florida	American Heritage HS	6 ft 5 in (1.96 m)	360 lb (160 kg)	—	Signed February 1, 2017
Tedarrell Slaton; OG	Recruit ratings: 247Sports: ESPN:					
Elijah Conliffe; DT	Hampton, Virginia	Hampton HS	6 ft 4 in (1.93 m)	305 lb (138 kg)	—	Signed February 1, 2017
Elijah Conliffe; DT	Recruit ratings: 247Sports: ESPN:					
C. J. Henderson; CB	Miami, Florida	Columbus HS	6 ft 1 in (1.85 m)	175 lb (79 kg)	—	Signed February 1, 2017
C. J. Henderson; CB	Recruit ratings: 247Sports: ESPN:					
Nick Smith; LB	Orlando, Florida	Dr. Phillips HS	6 ft 3 in (1.91 m)	210 lb (95 kg)	—	Signed February 1, 2017
Nick Smith; LB	Recruit ratings: 247Sports: ESPN:					
Brian Edwards; CB	Hollywood, Florida	Miramar HS	6 ft 3 in (1.91 m)	195 lb (88 kg)	—	Signed February 1, 2017
Brian Edwards; CB	Recruit ratings: 247Sports: ESPN:					
James Robinson IV; WR	Lakeland, Florida	Lakeland HS	6 ft 4 in (1.93 m)	205 lb (93 kg)	—	Signed February 1, 2017
James Robinson IV; WR	Recruit ratings: 247Sports: ESPN:					
Adarius Lemons; TB	Clearwater, Florida	Clearwater HS	6 ft 1 in (1.85 m)	195 lb (88 kg)	—	Signed February 1, 2017
Adarius Lemons; TB	Recruit ratings: 247Sports: ESPN:					
Overall recruit ranking: 247Sports: 10 ESPN: 13
‡ Refers to 40-yard dash; Note: In many cases, Scout, Rivals, 247Sports, On3, and ESPN may conflict in their listings of height, weight and 40 time.; In these cases, the average was taken. ESPN grades are on a 100-point scale.; Sources: "2017 Team Ranking". Rivals.com.

== Players drafted into the NFL ==
Round	Pick	Player	Position	NFL club
1	29	Taven Bryan	DT	Jacksonville Jaguars
2	56	Duke Dawson	CB	New England Patriots
4	105	Antonio Callaway	WR	Cleveland Browns
5	173	Johnny Townsend	P	Oakland Raiders
6	184	Marcell Harris	S	San Francisco 49ers
