= Feleipe Franks =

American football player (born 1997)

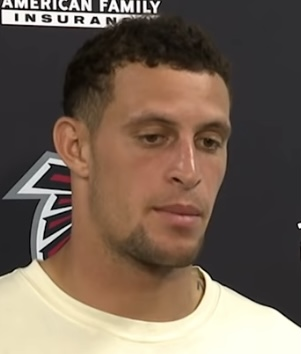
- Franks in 2021

No. 81 – Carolina Panthers
- Position: Tight end
- Roster status: Active

Personal information
- Born: December 22, 1997 (age 28); Crawfordville, Florida, U.S.
- Listed height: 6 ft 6 in (1.98 m)
- Listed weight: 252 lb (114 kg)

Career information
- High school: Wakulla (Crawfordville, Florida)
- College: Florida (2016–2019); Arkansas (2020)
- NFL draft: 2021: undrafted

Career history
- Atlanta Falcons (2021–2023); Carolina Panthers (2024); Atlanta Falcons (2025); Carolina Panthers (2026–present)

Career NFL statistics as of 2025
- Rushing yards: 10
- Rushing average: 1.7
- Receptions: 1
- Receiving yards: 12
- Receiving touchdowns: 0
- Stats at Pro Football Reference

Feleipe Franks (born December 22, 1997) is an American professional football tight end for the Carolina Panthers of the National Football League (NFL). A former quarterback, he played his first three years of college football at Florida and transferred to Arkansas for his final season. Franks joined the Atlanta Falcons as an undrafted free agent in 2021.

== Early life ==
Franks attended Wakulla High School in Crawfordville, Florida. During his high school career he passed for 6,867 yards and 81 touchdowns. Franks was regarded as a four-star recruit by the major recruiting services, and was rated as the fifth-highest ranked pro-style quarterback and 54th-highest ranked prospect overall in the 247Sports Composite. He originally committed to Louisiana State University (LSU) to play college football on June 1, 2014, but switched his commitment to the University of Florida on November 29, 2015.

== College career ==
=== Florida ===
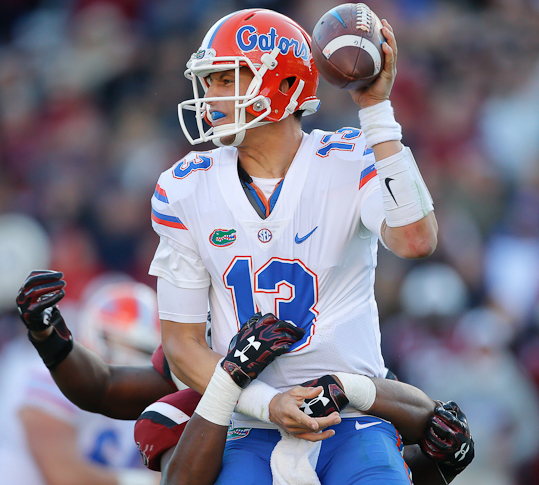
Franks with the Florida Gators in 2017

Franks redshirted his first year at Florida in 2016. As a redshirt freshman in 2017, he was named the starting quarterback heading into Florida's season opener against Michigan, beating out 2016 starter Luke Del Rio and incoming Notre Dame transfer Malik Zaire. Franks struggled in the game against Michigan, and was benched in favor of Zaire in the second half after completing 5 of 9 passes for 75 yards. The Gators went on to lose 33–17. In the Gators' next game on September 16, 2017, against Tennessee, Franks started the game and threw for 212 yards, including the game-winning 63-yard Hail Mary pass to receiver Tyrie Cleveland. Florida won the game 26–20 for Franks' first career win. After a 3–1 start, the Gators' season derailed, as they lost six of their final seven games to finish with a disappointing 4–7 record and the school's second losing season since 1979. Franks led the team in passing with 1,438 yards, nine touchdowns and eight interceptions.

As a redshirt sophomore in 2018, Franks was again named the starting quarterback ahead of the season's opening game, fighting off competition from fellow redshirt sophomore Kyle Trask and true freshman Emory Jones. He threw for 219 yards and five touchdowns in Florida's 53–6 opening win over Charleston Southern. He set a career high with 284 passing yards to go along with two touchdowns and an interception in an October 13 win over Vanderbilt. Franks helped the Gators to a dramatic turnaround compared with the 2017 season, as they finished with a 10–3 record and a victory over Michigan in the Peach Bowl, ending the season at seventh in the final polls. Franks posted 2,457 passing yards, 24 passing touchdowns, six interceptions, and seven rushing touchdowns on the year. His 31 total touchdowns was tied for third in the Southeastern Conference.

In Florida's 2019 opener, Franks completed 17 of 27 passes for 254 yards, two touchdowns, two interceptions, and a rushing touchdown in a 24–20 win over rival Miami. In the Gators' third game of the season against Kentucky, Franks was carted off the field with an apparent leg injury late in the third quarter. Florida head coach Dan Mullen said after the game that team doctors believed Franks suffered a broken ankle and would likely miss the remainder of the season. On December 1, 2019, Franks announced he would be leaving the Florida program.

=== Arkansas ===
On January 20, 2020, Franks announced he would be transferring to Arkansas. On September 16, 2020, he was named one of four team captains for the season, and was shortly thereafter named the starting quarterback for the Razorbacks' season opener against Georgia. On October 3, 2020, Franks led the Razorbacks in a 21–14 win against No. 16 Mississippi State, breaking Arkansas' 20-game SEC losing streak as well as their 15-game losing streak against ranked opponents.

=== Baseball ===
On June 5, 2019, the Boston Red Sox of MLB drafted Franks with the 947th overall pick (in the 31st round) of the 2019 MLB draft, and signed with the Red Sox for a signing bonus of $40,000. Franks, who played baseball in high school but not at Florida, indicated that he would continue his football career. On April 19, 2023, Franks was officially released from his Red Sox contract.

=== Statistics ===
Season	Team	Games			Passing								Rushing			
Season	Team	GP	GS	Record	Cmp	Att	Pct	Yds	Y/A	TD	Int	Rtg	Att	Yds	Avg	TD
2016	Florida	0	0	—	Redshirted (redshirt)											
2017	Florida	11	8	3–5	125	229	54.6	1,438	6.3	9	8	113.3	58	20	0.3	0
2018	Florida	13	13	10–3	188	322	58.4	2,457	7.6	24	6	143.4	110	350	3.2	7
2019	Florida	3	3	3–0	54	71	76.1	698	9.8	5	3	173.4	21	68	3.2	1
2020	Arkansas	10	9	3–6	163	238	68.5	2,107	8.9	17	4	163.1	105	204	1.9	1
Career		37	33	19–14	530	860	61.6	6,700	7.8	55	21	143.3	294	642	2.2	9

== Professional career ==
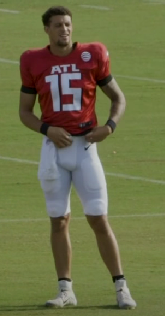
Franks with the Falcons in 2021

Pre-draft measurables
Height	Weight	Arm length	Hand span	Wingspan	40-yard dash	10-yard split	20-yard split	20-yard shuttle	Three-cone drill	Vertical jump	Broad jump
6 ft 6 5/8 in (2.00 m)	234 lb (106 kg)	34 in (0.86 m)	9 3/4 in (0.25 m)	6 ft 10 in (2.08 m)	4.61 s	1.70 s	2.63 s	4.22 s	7.16 s	32.5 in (0.83 m)	9 ft 9 in (2.97 m)
All values from Pro Day

=== Atlanta Falcons (first stint) ===
On May 3, 2021, Franks signed with the Atlanta Falcons as an undrafted free agent. He was named the third-string quarterback behind incumbent starter Matt Ryan and second-string backup Josh Rosen.

Franks made his NFL debut in Week 11 during the Falcons' final drive against the New England Patriots. His first pass was intercepted by safety Adrian Phillips, concluding the 25–0 shutout loss. The turnover marked the fourth consecutive Falcons drive to end with an interception, following two thrown by Ryan and one returned for a touchdown from Rosen.

In June 2022, Franks began taking reps at the tight end position, with the Falcons announcing they were planning to use him in a hybrid role.

On August 3, 2023, Franks was waived/injured by the Atlanta Falcons and placed on injured reserve.

=== Carolina Panthers (first stint) ===
On July 26, 2024, Franks signed with the Carolina Panthers. He was waived on August 27, and re-signed to the practice squad. He was promoted to the active roster on September 7, but waived two days later and re-signed to the practice squad. He was promoted back to the active roster the following week.

=== Atlanta Falcons (second stint) ===
On March 20, 2025, Franks signed with the Atlanta Falcons.

=== Carolina Panthers (second stint) ===
On March 20, 2026, Franks signed with the Carolina Panthers on a one-year contract.

== Personal life ==
Franks' older brother, Jordan, is a former NFL tight end.
