= Jachai Polite =

American football player (born 1998)

No. 95
- Position: Defensive lineman

Personal information
- Born: March 30, 1998 (age 28); Daytona Beach, Florida, U.S.
- Listed height: 6 ft 3 in (1.91 m)
- Listed weight: 245 lb (111 kg)

Career information
- High school: Mainland (Daytona Beach)
- College: Florida (2016–2018)
- NFL draft: 2019: 3rd round, 68th overall pick

Career history
- New York Jets (2019)*; Seattle Seahawks (2019)*; Los Angeles Rams (2019–2020); Toronto Argonauts (2022); Edmonton Elks (2022)
- * Offseason or practice squad member only

Awards and highlights
- First-team All-SEC (2018)

Career NFL statistics
- Total tackles: 4
- Sacks: 1.0
- Stats at Pro Football Reference

Jachai Dacuan Polite (born March 30, 1998) is an American former professional football player who was a linebacker in the National Football League (NFL) and Canadian Football League (CFL). He played college football for the Florida Gators. Polite was a member of the New York Jets, Seattle Seahawks, Los Angeles Rams, Toronto Argonauts and Edmonton Elks.

== Early life ==
Polite attended Mainland High School in Daytona Beach, Florida. He recorded four sacks his senior season and 13 his junior year. He committed to the University of Florida to play college football.

== College career ==
As a freshman at Florida in 2016, Polite played in 12 games and had 11 tackles and two sacks. As a sophomore in 2017, he played in seven games with four starts before suffering a season ending shoulder injury. He finished the year with 22 tackles and two sacks. He returned to Florida in 2018. On December 31, 2018, Polite announced that he would declare for the 2019 NFL draft.

=== College statistics ===
Year	Team	Class	Position	GP	Tackles					Interceptions					Fumbles			
Year	Team	Class	Position	GP	Solo	Ast	Total	Loss	Sack	Int	Yards	Avg	TD	PD	FR	Yards	TD	FF
2016	Florida	Freshman	DL	9	6	5	11	3.5	2.0	0	0	0.0	0	0	0	0	0	1
2017	Florida	Sophomore	DL	7	11	11	22	5.5	2.0	0	0	0.0	0	0	0	0	0	1
2018	Florida	Junior	DL	13	27	18	45	19.5	11.0	0	0	0.0	0	4	0	0	0	6

== Professional career ==
=== New York Jets ===
Polite was selected by the New York Jets in the third round of the 2019 NFL Draft, with the 68th overall pick. In May 2019, he signed a four-year contract worth $3.64 million, with a $1.12 million signing bonus. On August 31, 2019, Polite was waived by the Jets.

=== Seattle Seahawks ===
On September 2, 2019, Polite was signed to the practice squad of the Seattle Seahawks. He was released on September 23, 2019.

=== Los Angeles Rams ===
On September 25, 2019, Polite was signed to the Los Angeles Rams practice squad. He signed a reserve/future contract with the Rams on December 31, 2019. In Week 5 of the 2020 season against the Washington Football Team, Polite recorded his first career sack on Alex Smith during the 30–10 win. Polite was waived by the Rams on December 3, 2020, and re-signed to the practice squad two days later. He was placed on the practice squad/COVID-19 list by the team on December 12, 2020, and restored to the practice squad on December 22. He was released from the practice squad on January 12, 2021.

=== Toronto Argonauts ===
On March 1, 2022 Polite signed with the Toronto Argonauts of the Canadian Football League (CFL). He was released on August 3. Polite played in three games for the Argos, contributing with one defensive tackle, and one special teams tackle.

=== Edmonton Elks ===
On August 10, 2022, the Edmonton Elks of the CFL announced the signing of Polite to the practice roster. He was released by the Elks less than one month later on September 7, 2022.
