= Ventrell Miller =

American football player (born 1999)

No. 51 – Jacksonville Jaguars
- Position: Linebacker
- Roster status: Active

Personal information
- Born: January 15, 1999 (age 27); Orlando, Florida, U.S.
- Listed height: 6 ft 0 in (1.83 m)
- Listed weight: 232 lb (105 kg)

Career information
- High school: Kathleen (Lakeland, Florida)
- College: Florida (2017–2022)
- NFL draft: 2023: 4th round, 121st overall pick

Career history
- Jacksonville Jaguars (2023–present)

Career NFL statistics as of Week 5, 2026
- Total tackles: 151
- Sacks: 1
- Forced fumbles: 4
- Pass deflections: 9
- Interceptions: 1
- Stats at Pro Football Reference

Ventrell Miller (born January 15, 1999) is an American professional football linebacker for the Jacksonville Jaguars of the National Football League (NFL). He played college football for the Florida Gators.

== Early life ==
Miller attended Kathleen High School in Lakeland, Florida. He had 50 tackles his senior year and 104 his junior year. He committed to the University of Florida to play college football.

== College career ==
Miller was suspended, along with eight other players, his first year at Florida in 2017 due to felony fraud charges. He returned from the suspension in 2018 and appeared in all 13 games recording 15 tackles, one sack and one interception which he returned 82 yards for a touchdown. Miller became a starter his sophomore year in 2019, starting 11 of 12 games and finishing with 55 tackles and three sacks. He returned as a starter his junior year in 2020.

== Professional career ==
Pre-draft measurables
Height	Weight	Arm length	Hand span	Wingspan
5 ft 11 7/8 in (1.83 m)	232 lb (105 kg)	32 1/2 in (0.83 m)	9 1/8 in (0.23 m)	6 ft 6 7/8 in (2.00 m)
All values from the NFL Combine

Miller was selected by the Jacksonville Jaguars in the fourth round, 121st overall, of the 2023 NFL draft. He was placed on injured reserve on August 29, 2023.

== NFL career statistics ==
Legend
**Bold**	Career high

=== Regular season ===
Year	Team	Games		Tackles					Interceptions						Fumbles				
Year	Team	GP	GS	Cmb	Solo	Ast	Sck	TFL	Int	Yds	Avg	Lng	TD	PD	FF	Fmb	FR	Yds	TD
2024	JAX	15	9	**80**	**53**	**27**	0.0	**4**	0	0	0.0	0	0	3	1	0	0	0	0
2025	JAX	17	2	38	17	21	0.0	0	**1**	0	0.0	0	0	**4**	**2**	0	0	0	0
2026	JAX	5	5	33	18	15	1.0	3	0	0	0.0	0	0	2	1	0	0	0	0
Career		37	16	151	88	63	1.0	7	1	0	0.0	0	0	9	4	0	0	0	0

=== Postseason ===
Year	Team	Games		Tackles					Interceptions						Fumbles				
Year	Team	GP	GS	Cmb	Solo	Ast	Sck	TFL	Int	Yds	Avg	Lng	TD	PD	FF	Fmb	FR	Yds	TD
2025	JAX	1	0	0	0	0	0.0	0	0	0	0.0	0	0	0	0	0	0	0	0
Career		1	0	0	0	0	0.0	0	0	0	0.0	0	0	0	0	0	0	0	0
