= C. J. Gardner-Johnson =

American football player (born 1997)

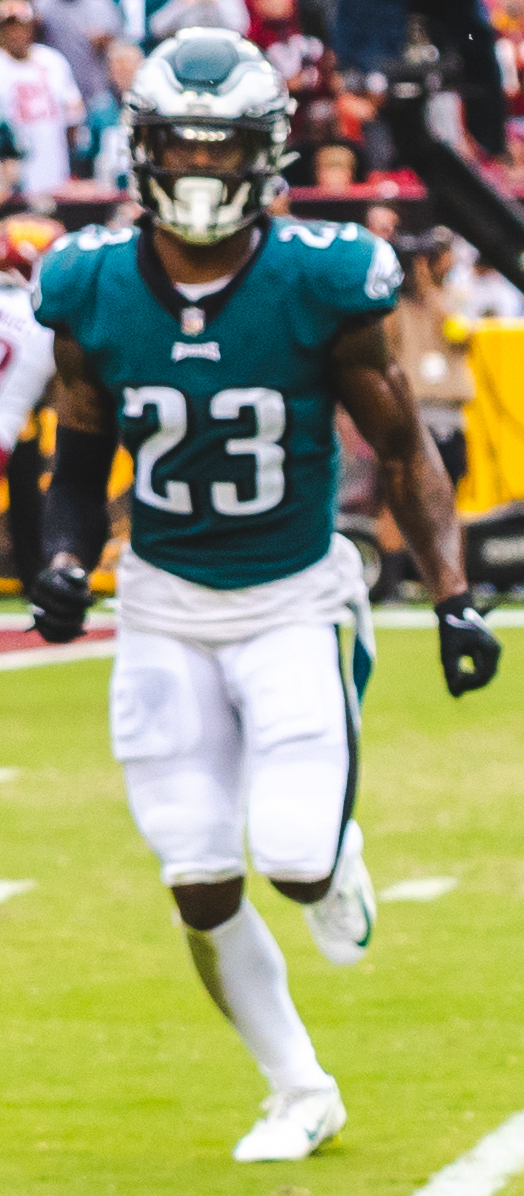
- Gardner-Johnson with the Eagles in 2022

Profile
- Position: Safety

Personal information
- Born: December 20, 1997 (age 28); Cocoa, Florida, U.S.
- Listed height: 5 ft 11 in (1.80 m)
- Listed weight: 208 lb (94 kg)

Career information
- High school: Cocoa
- College: Florida (2016–2018)
- NFL draft: 2019: 4th round, 105th overall pick

Career history
- New Orleans Saints (2019–2021); Philadelphia Eagles (2022); Detroit Lions (2023); Philadelphia Eagles (2024); Houston Texans (2025); Baltimore Ravens (2025)*; Chicago Bears (2025); Buffalo Bills (2026)
- * Offseason or practice squad member only

Awards and highlights
- Super Bowl champion (LIX); NFL interceptions co-leader (2022); PFWA All-Rookie Team (2019)

Career NFL statistics as of Week 6, 2026
- Total tackles: 396
- Sacks: 7.0
- Forced fumbles: 3
- Fumble recoveries: 1
- Pass deflections: 57
- Interceptions: 21
- Defensive touchdowns: 1
- Stats at Pro Football Reference

Chauncey "C. J." Gardner-Johnson (né Gardner Jr.; born December 20, 1997) is an American professional football safety. He played college football for the Florida Gators and was selected by the New Orleans Saints in the fourth round of the 2019 NFL draft. He has also played for the Detroit Lions, Philadelphia Eagles, Houston Texans, Chicago Bears and Buffalo Bills, winning Super Bowl LIX with the Eagles.

== Name changes ==
Gardner-Johnson was known as Chauncey Gardner Jr. prior to his junior year at Florida. On December 31, 2017, he announced that he changed his last name to Gardner-Johnson in honor of his stepfather, Brian Johnson. His father Chauncey Gardner Sr. has been a part of his life, but Johnson raised Gardner-Johnson since he was a toddler until he left for college.

In both 2020 and 2023, Gardner-Johnson posted his intention to legally change his name to Ceedy Duce on Instagram. Despite this, he has yet to formally change it. In 2020, he stated "Officially changing my name to Ceedy Duce. No more Chauncey or C.J. Gardner-Johnson. Time to pave a way for my own imagine [sic] that I want no more judgement [sic], thoughts on me, because you really don't know me, until you understand me as a person I won't speak unless spoken to." In 2023, he said "Court doucments [sic] otw (on the way). It's a different person. I got an alter ego. I got like two different people living in me, football and life. Life, I’m just chilling. Football, that’s a whole different person. People call me Ceedy on the football field or Ducey. In life, they call me C.J. or Chauncey".

== College career ==
As a true freshman at Florida, Gardner-Johnson appeared in all 14 games, making starts in the final seven games of the season. During the 2017 Outback Bowl, Gardner-Johnson had two tackles and two interceptions, one of which was returned for a touchdown against Iowa. He was named the MVP of the Outback Bowl. During his sophomore season, Gardner-Johnson started in all 11 games. Before his junior season, Gardner-Johnson was moved to the nickelback position. On November 26, 2018, Gardner-Johnson announced that he would forgo his final year of eligibility and declare for the 2019 NFL draft.

== Professional career ==
=== Pre-draft ===
External videos
- Gardner-Johnson runs 4.48 40-yard dash

NFL draft analysts had him projected to be drafted as early as the second round of the 2019 NFL Draft. Chris Trapasso of CBS Sports ranked Gardner-Johnson as the second best safety prospect prior to the NFL Scouting Combine. After the NFL Combine, WalterFootball.com, Pro Football Focus, and NFL draft analyst Rob Rang ranked Gardner-Johnson as the fifth best safety prospect in the draft. Matt Miller of Bleacher Report also ranked him as the fifth best safety and projected him to be selected in the second round. Sports Illustrated ranked him as the second best safety prospect in the draft. Scouts Inc. had him as the fifth best safety prospect (83rd overall) in the 2019 NFL Draft.

Pre-draft measurables
Height	Weight	Arm length	Hand span	Wingspan	40-yard dash	10-yard split	20-yard split	20-yard shuttle	Three-cone drill	Vertical jump	Broad jump	Bench press
5 ft 10 7/8 in (1.80 m)	210 lb (95 kg)	30 7/8 in (0.78 m)	9 1/4 in (0.23 m)	6 ft 2 in (1.88 m)	4.48 s	1.48 s	2.62 s	4.20 s	7.03 s	37.0 in (0.94 m)	10 ft 2 in (3.10 m)	17 reps
All values from NFL Combine/Pro Day

=== New Orleans Saints ===
The New Orleans Saints selected Gardner-Johnson in the fourth round (105th overall) of the 2019 NFL draft. The New Orleans Saints orchestrated a trade to ensure the acquisition of Gardner-Johnson by agreeing to exchange their fourth (116th overall) and fifth round picks (168th overall) in the 2019 NFL Draft with the New York Jets for their fourth round pick (105th overall). He became the ninth safety drafted in 2019.

"The key was getting the fourth round pick back. That allowed us being in a position to move up and get Chauncey. We were excited about that. We traded up not down. You like a player, go get him. That's our philosophy. We were surprised Chauncey was still available. It’s calculated and when you have the opportunity to go get a player you covet, you go get them. That’s our philosophy and it has been a successful formula for us."

— Mickey Loomis (Saints' General Manager)

External videos
- Saints draft Gardner-Johnson No. 105

==== 2019 ====
On May 10, 2019, the New Orleans Saints signed Gardner-Johnson to a four–year, $3.30 million rookie contract that includes an initial signing bonus of $784,100.

"He's smart, and he's quickly picked up the installation. He's had a good couple of days. You can see he's versatile. I think he can play over the slot in the nickel role and also as a safety. He's taken some one-on-one reps, even in corner. He has some versatility."

— Sean Payton (Saints' head coach)

Throughout training camp, Gardner-Johnson competed for a role as a backup safety against Chris Banjo, Saquan Hampton, J. T. Gray, and Terrell Williams. Defensive coordinator Dennis Allen also had Gardner-Johnson take reps at nickelback in camp. Head coach Sean Payton chose Gardner-Johnson to be the backup strong safety to start the season, behind starter Vonn Bell.

In September 9, 2019, Gardner-Johnson made his professional regular season debut in the New Orleans Saints' home-opener against the Houston Texans, but was limited to one tackle in their 30–28 victory. In Week 7, Gardner-Johnson earned his first career start, starting as a nickelback, and collected a season-high seven solo tackles and a season-high two pass deflections in a 36–25 victory at the Chicago Bears. In a Week 13 game against the Atlanta Falcons on Thanksgiving Day, Gardner-Johnson recorded his first career interception off a pass thrown by Matt Ryan in the 26–18 win. On December 16, 2019, Gardner-Johnson had his first start at strong safety and recorded eight combined tackles (six solo) and forced a fumble by wide receiver Kalif Raymond which he recovered during the 34–7 win against the Indianapolis Colts. He started the last three games at strong safety in place of Vonn Bell who was inactive due to a knee sprain. He finished his rookie campaign in 2019 with a total of 42 combined tackles (34 solo), eight pass deflections, one interception, one forced fumble, and a fumble recovery in 16 games and seven starts. He was named to the PFWA All-Rookie Team.

The New Orleans Saints finished the 2019 NFL season a top their division in the NFC South with a 13–3 record, clinching a playoff berth. On January 5, 2020, Gardner-Johnson started in his first career playoff game and recorded three combined tackles (two solo) and made one pass deflection during a 20–26 overtime loss against the Minnesota Vikings in the NFC Wildcard Game.

==== 2020 ====
During training camp, Gardner-Johnson competed against Malcolm Jenkins for the role as the starting free safety following the departure of Vonn Bell. Head coach Sean Payton named him a backup safety to begin the season, behind starting tandem Malcolm Jenkins and Marcus Williams.

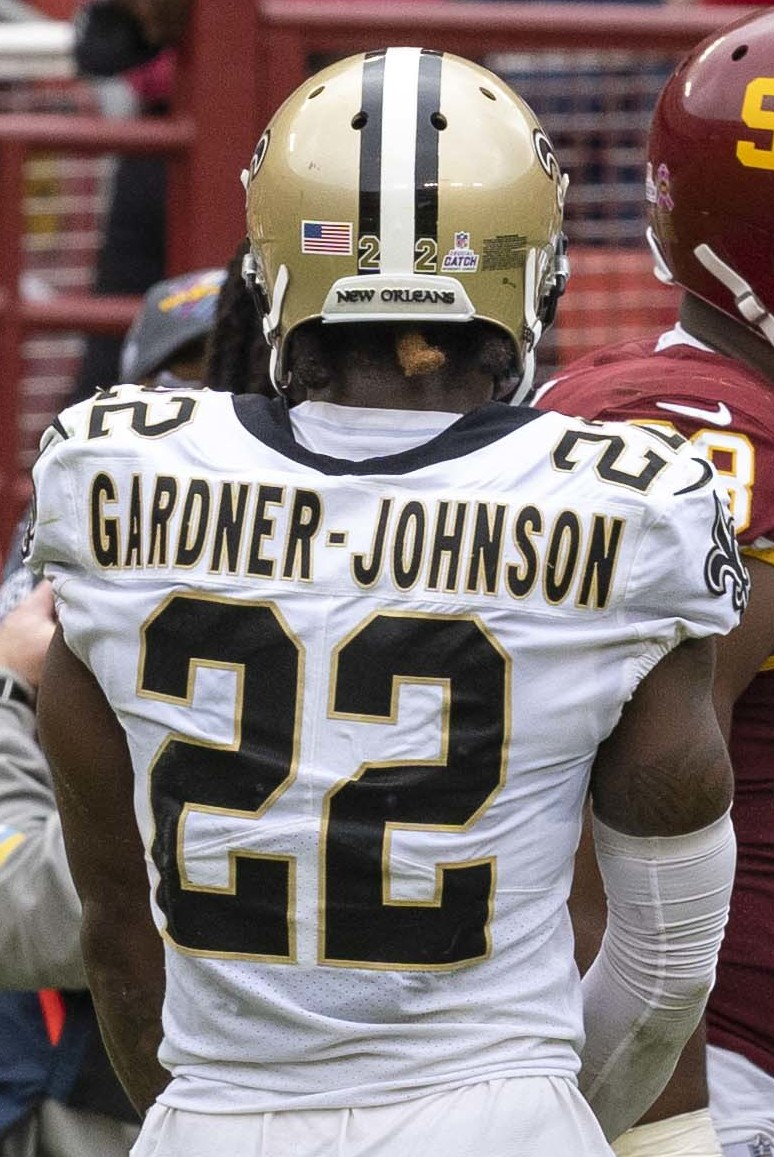
Gardner-Johnson in 2021

On September 13, 2020, Gardner-Johnson started in the New Orleans Saints' home-opener against the Tampa Bay Buccaneers and collected a season-high ten combined tackles (nine solo) and made one pass deflection during a 34–23 victory. On October 11, 2020, Gardner-Johnson was punched by teammate Michael Thomas during practice, which led to Thomas being benched for the following game. On November 1, 2020, Gardner-Johnson recorded nine combined tackles (eight solo) and was involved in a physical altercation with Bears' wide receiver Javon Wims during the third quarter of a 26–23 victory over the Chicago Bears. He was sucker-punched by Wims, which ignited a scuffle between both teams. Wims ran up to the back of an unsuspecting Gardner-Johnson and punched him in the helmet, but Gardner-Johnson did not react, leading to another punch by Wims and Wims was ejected by referees. Earlier broadcast showed Gardner-Johnson ripping off Wims' mouthguard off his helmet and Wims claimed Gardner-Johnson had also spit on him, but no evidence supported this claim and it was denied by Gardner-Johnson. The following day, the NFL reportedly suspended Wims for the next two games and fined Gardner-Johnson $5,128 for his involvement.

In Week 10, Gardner-Johnson recorded eight combined tackles (six solo), made one pass deflection, and had his first career sack on quarterback Nick Mullens for a six–yard loss during a 27–13 win against the San Francisco 49ers. In Week 12, he recorded one tackle, made two pass deflections, and had his only interception of the season on a pass thrown by wide receiver Kendall Hinton to tight end Troy Fumagalli during a 31–3 win at the Denver Broncos. On December 30, 2020, the Saints placed him on the COVID-19/reserve list and he subsequently missed a Week 17 victory at the Carolina Panthers. On January 8, 2021, he was taken off the COVID-19/reserve list and added to the active roster. He finished the season with 66 combined tackles (52 solo), 13 passes defended, one interception, and a sack in 15 games and 13 starts.

The New Orleans Saints finished the 2020 NFL season a top the NFC South with a 12–4 record to clinch a playoff berth. On January 10, 2021, in the NFC Wild Card Round, Gardner-Johnson recorded eight combined tackles (six solo) and a pass deflection and was also involved in a scuffle with receiver, Anthony Miller that led to Miller's ejection while they both received unsportsmanlike conduct penalties as the Saints defeated the Chicago Bears 21–9.

==== 2021 ====
Throughout training camp, Gardner-Johnson competed to be the starting strong safety against Malcolm Jenkins. Head coach Sean Payton named Malcolm Jenkins and Marcus Williams the starting safeties to begin the season with Gardner-Johnson as a primary backup safety and first-team nickelback.

External videos
- Gardner-Johnson baits Tom Brady INT

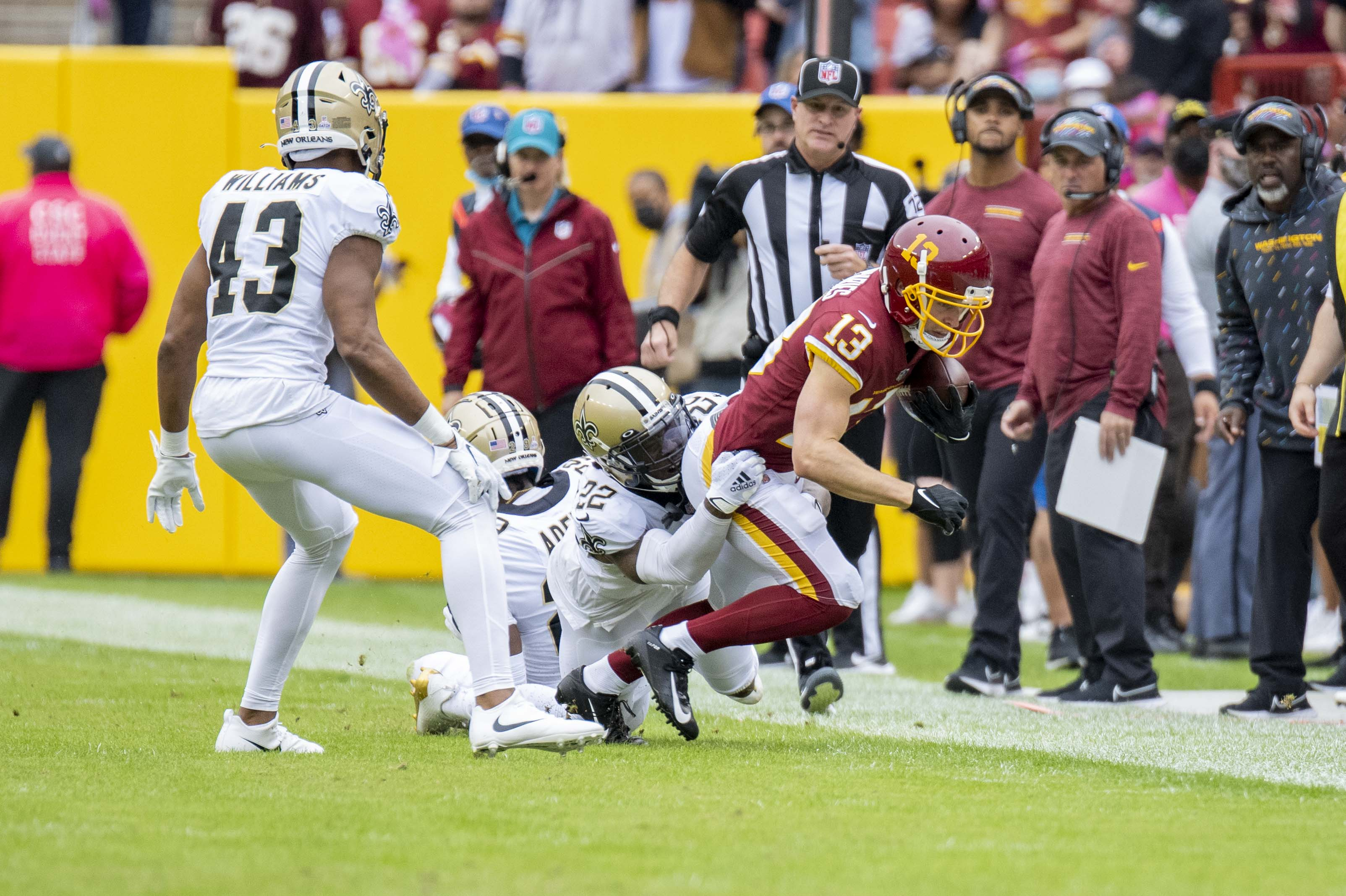
Gardner-Johnson (#22) playing against the Washington Football Team in 2021.

He was inactive for the Saints' Week 2 loss at the Carolina Panthers after injuring his knee. In Week 9, he recorded two combined tackles (one solo) and broke up a pass before exiting in the third quarter of a 25–27 loss to the Atlanta Falcons due to a foot injury. On November 13, 2021, the Saints officially placed him on injured reserve due to his foot injury. On December 11, 2021, he was activated from injured reserve and added to the Saints' active roster after missing four games (Weeks 10–13). On December 19, 2021, Gardner-Johnson collected a season-high seven combined tackles (six solo), made a pass deflection, and intercepted a pass thrown by Tom Brady to Scotty Miller late in the game to close out the 9–0 shutout victory at the Tampa Bay Buccaneers. In Week 17, he made one solo tackle, one pass deflection, set a career-high with his second sack of the season, and had an interception on a pass attempt by Sam Darnold to wide receiver D. J. Moore at the end of the fourth quarter to seal a 10–18 win against the Carolina Panthers. He finished the 2021 season with 46 combined tackles (32 solo), three interceptions, seven passes defended, and a career-high two sacks in 12 games and 11 starts.

=== Philadelphia Eagles (first stint) ===
==== 2022 ====
On August 30, 2022, the New Orleans Saints traded Gardner-Johnson along with a 2025 seventh-round pick to the Philadelphia Eagles in return for a 2023 fifth-round pick (165th overall) and the lower of their two sixth-round picks (199th overall) in 2024.

He entered training camp slated to be a starting safety following the departures of Anthony Harris and Rodney McLeod. He competed for the role of starting strong safety against K'Von Wallace under defensive coordinator Jonathan Gannon. Head coach Nick Sirianni named him the starting strong safety to begin the regular season and paired him with Marcus Epps.

On October 9, 2022, Gardner-Johnson recorded ten solo tackles, a pass deflection, and had his first interception as a member of the Eagles on a pass thrown by Kyler Murray to wide receiver Marquise Brown during a 20–17 win at the Arizona Cardinals. The following week, he made four combined tackles (three solo), two pass deflections, and a career-high two interceptions off passes by Cooper Rush as the Eagles defeated the Dallas Cowboys season 26–17 in Week 6. On November 14, 2022, he made six solo tackles, tied his season-high of two pass deflections, and set a career-high with his sixth interception of the season on a pass by Taylor Heinicke to mark his fifth consecutive game with an interception during a 21–32 loss to the Washington Commanders. The following week, he set a career-high with 11 solo tackles during a 17–16 win at the Indianapolis Colts in Week 11. In Week 12, he recorded one solo tackle before exiting during the second quarter of a 40–33 win against the Green Bay Packers after sustaining an injury. On December 3, 2022, the Eagles officially placed him on injured reserve due to a lacerated kidney. He was leading the league with six interceptions at the time. On January 7, 2023, he was activated from injured reserve and added to the active roster after missing five games (Weeks 13–17). He finished the 2022 season with one sack, 67 combined tackles (61 solo), six interceptions, and eight passes defended.

The Philadelphia Eagles finished the 2022 NFL season a top the NFC East with a 14–3 record to clinch a first-round bye. They routed the New York Giants 38–7 in the Divisional Round. On January 29, 2023, Gardner-Johnson started in the NFC Championship Game and made five combined tackles (two solo) as the Eagles routed the San Francisco 49ers 31–7 to advance to the Super Bowl. On February 12, 2023, Gardner-Johnson started in Super Bowl LVII and recorded four combined tackles (three solo) in the Eagles' 38–35 loss to the Kansas City Chiefs.

=== Detroit Lions ===
==== 2023 ====
On March 20, 2023, the Detroit Lions signed Gardner-Johnson to a fully guaranteed one–year, $6.50 million contract that includes an initial signing bonus of $4.00 million.

On July 23, 2023, Gardner-Johnson suffered a non-contact leg injury during the start of Lions training camp. Despite fears of a potentially season-ending ligament injury, it was announced the next day after an MRI that Gardner-Johnson avoided structural damage and was "day-to-day" in his recovery. Throughout training camp, he competed to be a starting safety against Kerby Joseph and Tracy Walker. Head coach Dan Campbell named him the starting free safety to begin the season and paired him with starting strong safety Kerby Joseph.

On September 17, 2023, he collected a season-high eight combined tackles (six solo) during a 31–37 overtime loss to the Seattle Seahawks before exiting in the fourth quarter due to an injury. On September 19, 2023, the Lions placed him on injured reserve after suffering a torn pectoral. On December 14, 2023, Gardner-Johnson was medically cleared to return to the field. On January 6, 2024, the Lions removed him from injured reserve and added him to the active roster after missing 14 games (Weeks 3–17). On January 7, 2024, Gardner-Johnson made four solo tackles, a pass deflection, and had his only interception of the season on a pass by Nick Mullens to wide receiver Jordan Addison during a 30–20 win against the Minnesota Vikings. He finished the 2023 NFL season with only 17 combined tackles (16 solo), three pass deflections, and one interception in three games and two starts.

=== Philadelphia Eagles (second stint) ===
==== 2024 ====
On March 14, 2024, the Philadelphia Eagles signed Gardner-Johnson to a three–year, $27 million contract that includes $10 million guaranteed. He entered training camp slated as the de facto starting strong safety under defensive coordinator Vic Fangio following the departure of Kevin Byard. Head coach Nick Sirianni named him the starting strong safety to begin the season and paired him with free safety Reed Blankenship.

External videos
- Gardner-Johnson picks off Jayden Daniels
- Gardner-Johnson returns INT for 69-yard TD

In Week 10, he collected a season-high seven combined tackles (two solo), made a pass deflection, and intercepted a pass thrown by Trey Lance to wide receiver Jalen Tolbert during a 34–6 win at the Dallas Cowboys. On December 8, 2024, he recorded six combined tackles (three solo), set a season-high with two pass deflections, and intercepted a pass by Bryce Young during a 22–16 win against the Carolina Panthers. On December 29, 2024, Gardner-Johnson had one solo tackle, two pass deflections, and tied his career-high of two interceptions, returning one for his first career touchdown during a 41–7 win over the Dallas Cowboys. He scored his first career touchdown on the Cowboys' opening drive of the game after intercepting a pass thrown by Cooper Rush intended for wide receiver Brandin Cooks and returned it for a 69-yard pick-six. His performance earned him NFC Defensive Player of the Week. Head coach Nick Sirianni opted to rest Gardner-Johnson and the rest of the starters during a Week 18 victory against the New York Giants to rest them before the playoffs. He finished the season with 59 combined tackles (35 solo), 12 pass deflections, a career-high tying six interceptions, and one touchdown in 16 games and 16 starts.

The Philadelphia Eagles finished the 2024 NFL season first in the NFC East with a 14–3 record. They defeated the Green Bay Packers 22–10 in the NFC Wildcard Game. On January 19, 2025, he made six combined tackles (five solo) during a 28–22 win against the Los Angeles Rams in the Divisional Round. On January 26, 2025, he started in the NFC Championship Game and had five combined tackles (three solo) as the Eagles routed the Washington Commanders 55–23 to advance to the Super Bowl. On February 9, 2025, Gardner-Johnson started in Super Bowl LIX and had three combined tackles (one solo) during a 40–22 victory against the Kansas City Chiefs. He earned the first Super Bowl ring of his career. Gardner-Johnson was one of a dozen Eagles players of the Super Bowl LIX championship team that did not participate in the White House visit in April 2025 though he stated his reasoning for skipping was not politically motivated and was due to his appearance and weight.

=== Houston Texans ===
On March 12, 2025, Gardner-Johnson and a 2026 sixth-round draft pick were traded to the Houston Texans in exchange for guard Kenyon Green and a 2025 fifth-round draft pick. On August 7, Gardner-Johnson suffered a leg injury during practice. Gardner-Johnson started the first three games of the season for Houston, recording 15 combined tackles. On September 23, the Texans released him.

=== Baltimore Ravens ===
On October 7, 2025, Gardner-Johnson was signed to the practice squad of the Baltimore Ravens. On October 14, he was released by the Ravens.

=== Chicago Bears ===
On October 29, 2025, Gardner-Johnson was signed by the Chicago Bears, reuniting him with defensive coordinator and former Saints coach Dennis Allen. His signing came after cornerback Kyler Gordon was placed on injured reserve, so Allen assigned Gardner-Johnson to a similar role that included blitzing as a nickelback.

In his first game with the Bears, a Week 9 victory over the Cincinnati Bengals, he recorded his first sack since 2022 along with six tackles. Gardner-Johnson had two sacks and a forced fumble in the following week's win against the Giants, becoming the first Bears defensive back with multiple sacks in a game since Ricky Manning in 2006. He suffered a concussion in the final game of the regular season, which kept him from playing in the Bears' Wild Card victory over Green Bay before returning with a four-tackle performance in the season-ending Divisional Round overtime loss to the Los Angeles Rams.

=== Buffalo Bills ===
On March 13, 2026, Gardner-Johnson signed a one-year, $6 million contract with the Buffalo Bills. During Week 6 against the Las Vegas Raiders, Gardner-Johnson was disqualified after spitting towards Tyler Linderbaum and Brock Bowers. He was then suspended for one game on October 19. On November 3, the Bills released him.

== Personal life ==
In a June 2026 interview, Gardner-Johnson revealed he has seven kids, ranging from ages 1 to 15. When asked how he handles it, he explained, "I told you I had to go through some shit. I was young, 13, 14 years old, really going through a lot. But that don't bother me."

== NFL career statistics ==
=== Regular season ===
Legend
	Won the Super Bowl
	Led the league
**Bold**	Career high

Year	Team	Games		Tackles					Interceptions						Fumbles			
Year	Team	GP	GS	Comb	Solo	Ast	Sck	TFL	PD	Int	Yds	Avg	Lng	TD	FF	FR	Yds	TD
2019	NO	16	7	49	38	11	0.0	**6**	8	1	28	28.0	28	0	**1**	**1**	**37**	0
2020	NO	15	13	66	52	14	1.0	5	**13**	1	3	3.0	3	0	0	0	0	0
2021	NO	12	11	46	32	14	2.0	4	7	3	45	15.0	26	0	0	0	0	0
2022	PHI	12	12	**67**	**61**	6	1.0	5	8	**6**	54	9.0	25	0	0	0	0	0
2023	DET	3	2	17	16	1	0.0	0	3	1	0	0.0	0	0	0	0	0	0
2024	PHI	16	16	59	35	**24**	0.0	2	12	**6**	**116**	19.3	**69**	**1**	**1**	0	0	0
2025	HOU	3	3	15	11	4	0.0	0	0	0	0	0.0	0	0	0	0	0	0
2025	CHI	10	7	51	35	16	**3.0**	5	4	2	60	30.0	32	0	**1**	0	0	0
2026	BUF	6	6	26	17	9	0.0	0	2	1	41	**41.0**	41	0	0	0	0	0
Career		93	79	396	297	99	7.0	27	57	21	347	16.5	69	1	3	1	37	0

=== Postseason ===
Year	Team	Games		Tackles					Interceptions						Fumbles			
Year	Team	GP	GS	Comb	Solo	Ast	Sck	TFL	PD	Int	Yds	Avg	Lng	TD	FF	FR	Yds	TD
2019	NO	1	1	3	2	1	0.0	0	**1**	0	–	–	–	–	0	0	–	–
2020	NO	2	2	10	7	3	0.0	0	**1**	0	–	–	–	–	0	0	–	–
2022	PHI	3	3	12	7	5	0.0	0	**1**	0	–	–	–	–	0	0	–	–
2023	DET	3	0	12	5	**7**	0.0	0	**1**	**1**	**12**	**12.0**	**12**	0	0	0	–	–
2024	PHI	4	4	**14**	**9**	5	0.0	**1**	0	0	–	–	–	–	0	0	–	–
2025	CHI	1	1	4	4	0	0.0	0	**1**	0	–	–	–	–	0	0	–	–
Career		14	11	55	34	21	0.0	1	5	1	12	12.0	12	0	0	0	0	0
