= Jordan Scarlett (American football) =

American football player (born 1996)

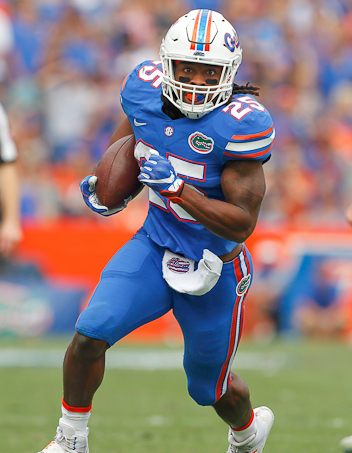
- Scarlett with the Florida Gators in 2016

No. 20, 22
- Position: Running back

Personal information
- Born: February 9, 1996 (age 30); Fort Lauderdale, Florida, U.S.
- Listed height: 5 ft 11 in (1.80 m)
- Listed weight: 210 lb (95 kg)

Career information
- High school: St. Thomas Aquinas (Fort Lauderdale)
- College: Florida (2015–2018)
- NFL draft: 2019: 5th round, 154th overall pick

Career history
- Carolina Panthers (2019); Detroit Lions (2020)*; Miami Dolphins (2021); Montreal Alouettes (2022)*; Edmonton Elks (2022)*; Philadelphia Stars (2023)*
- * Offseason or practice squad member only

Career NFL statistics
- Rushing yards: 9
- Rushing average: 2.3
- Stats at Pro Football Reference

Jordan Scarlett (born February 9, 1996) is an American former professional football player who was a running back in the National Football League (NFL). He played college football for the Florida Gators and was selected by the Carolina Panthers in the fifth round of the 2019 NFL draft.

== Professional career ==
=== Carolina Panthers ===
Scarlett was selected by the Carolina Panthers in the fifth round (154th overall) of the 2019 NFL draft. He entered his rookie year in 2019 as the third running back on the depth chart behind Christian McCaffrey and Reggie Bonnafon. He played in nine games, primarily on special teams, before suffering knee and ankle injuries in Week 12. He was placed on injured reserve on November 29, 2019.

Scarlett was waived on August 23, 2020.

=== Detroit Lions ===
On December 16, 2020, Scarlett was signed to the practice squad of the Detroit Lions.

=== Miami Dolphins ===
On January 12, 2021, Scarlett signed a reserve/future contract with the Miami Dolphins. He was waived on August 31, 2021 and re-signed to the practice squad the next day, but was shortly released. He was re-signed to the practice squad on December 16. His contract expired when the teams season ended on January 9, 2022.

=== Montreal Alouettes ===
On April 12, 2022, Scarlett signed with the Montreal Alouettes of the Canadian Football League (CFL). He was released on June 5, 2022.

=== Edmonton Elks ===
On July 6, 2022, Scarlett was signed to the practice squad of the Edmonton Elks of the CFL. He was released on July 17, 2022.

=== Philadelphia Stars ===
On January 19, 2023, Scarlett signed with the Philadelphia Stars of the United States Football League (USFL). On April 4, 2023, Scarlett was released by the Stars.
