= Tyrie Cleveland =

American football player (born 1997)

No. 12, 16, 85
- Position: Wide receiver

Personal information
- Born: September 20, 1997 (age 29); Jacksonville, Florida, U.S.
- Listed height: 6 ft 2 in (1.88 m)
- Listed weight: 205 lb (93 kg)

Career information
- High school: Westfield (Houston, Texas)
- College: Florida (2016–2019)
- NFL draft: 2020: 7th round, 252nd overall pick

Career history
- Denver Broncos (2020–2022); Philadelphia Eagles (2022)*; Indianapolis Colts (2023–2024)*; Saskatchewan Roughriders (2026)*
- * Offseason or practice squad member only

Career NFL statistics
- Receptions: 8
- Receiving yards: 91
- Return yards: 234
- Stats at Pro Football Reference

Tyrie Cleveland (born September 20, 1997) is an American former professional football player who was a wide receiver in the National Football League (NFL). He played college football for the Florida Gators.

== Early life ==
Cleveland attended and played high school football at Westfield High School. He received offers from numerous schools before committing to the University of Florida.

== College career ==
As a freshman, Cleveland recorded a 98-yard receiving touchdown against LSU in a 16–10 victory that clinched the SEC East for the Gators. In the 2016 season, he finished with 14 receptions for 298 receiving yards and two receiving touchdowns. Early in the 2017 season, Cleveland had a huge play in a key Southeastern Conference matchup between the Florida Gators and the Tennessee Volunteers. During the game, Florida quarterback Feleipe Franks completed a 63-yard Hail Mary touchdown pass to Cleveland to earn a victory at the end of the game as the time expired. After the game, Cleveland was named the SEC Player of the Week. In the 2017 season, he finished with 22 receptions for 410 receiving yards and two receiving touchdowns. In the 2018 season, he finished with 18 receptions for 212 receiving yards and three receiving touchdowns. In the 2019 season, he finished with 25 receptions for 351 receiving yards and one receiving touchdown.

== Professional career ==
Pre-draft measurables
Height	Weight	Arm length	Hand span	Wingspan	40-yard dash	10-yard split	20-yard split	Vertical jump	Broad jump	Bench press
6 ft 2 3/8 in (1.89 m)	209 lb (95 kg)	32 7/8 in (0.84 m)	9 1/8 in (0.23 m)	6 ft 6 in (1.98 m)	4.46 s	1.54 s	2.61 s	39.5 in (1.00 m)	10 ft 6 in (3.20 m)	13 reps
All values from NFL Combine

=== Denver Broncos ===
Cleveland was selected by the Denver Broncos with the 252nd overall pick in the seventh round of the 2020 NFL draft.

On August 31, 2021, Cleveland was waived by the Broncos and re-signed to the practice squad the next day. He was promoted to the active roster on October 20, 2021. He was waived on December 4 and re-signed to the practice squad. He was promoted to the active roster on January 7, 2022.

Cleveland made the Broncos final roster in 2022. He played in six games before being waived on November 15, 2022, and re-signed to the practice squad.

=== Philadelphia Eagles ===
On January 17, 2023, the Philadelphia Eagles signed Cleveland to their practice squad. On February 15, Cleveland signed a reserve/future contract with the Eagles. He was waived on August 19.

=== Indianapolis Colts ===
On October 17, 2023, Cleveland was signed to the Indianapolis Colts' practice squad. On January 8, 2024, he signed a reserve/future contract with the Colts. Cleveland was released by Indianapolis on August 25.

=== Saskatchewan Roughriders ===
On February 5, 2026, Cleveland signed with the Saskatchewan Roughriders in the Canadian Football League (CFL). On May 14, Cleveland retired from professional football.
