= Fred Johnson (offensive lineman) =

American football player (born 1997)

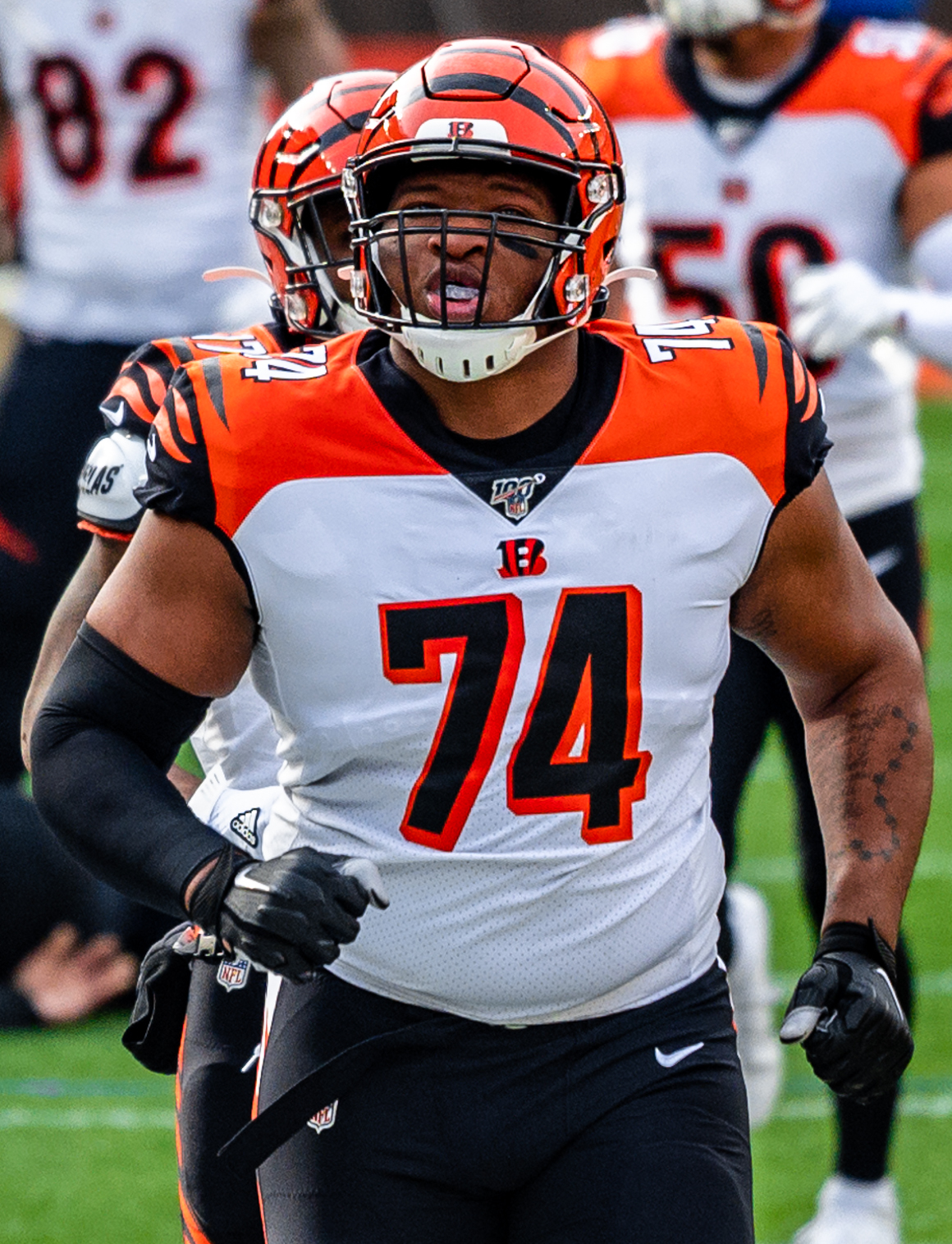
- Johnson with the Cincinnati Bengals in 2019

Kansas City Chiefs
- Position: Offensive tackle
- Roster status: Practice squad

Personal information
- Born: June 5, 1997 (age 29); West Palm Beach, Florida, U.S.
- Listed height: 6 ft 7 in (2.01 m)
- Listed weight: 326 lb (148 kg)

Career information
- High school: Royal Palm Beach (FL)
- College: Florida (2015–2018)
- NFL draft: 2019: undrafted

Career history
- Pittsburgh Steelers (2019); Cincinnati Bengals (2019–2021); Tampa Bay Buccaneers (2022); Philadelphia Eagles (2022–2024); Jacksonville Jaguars (2025)*; Philadelphia Eagles (2025–2026); Kansas City Chiefs (2026–present)*
- * Offseason or practice squad member only

Awards and highlights
- Super Bowl champion (LIX)

Career NFL statistics as of Week 10, 2026
- Games played: 86
- Games started: 22
- Stats at Pro Football Reference

Fred Johnson (born June 5, 1997) is an American professional football offensive tackle for the Kansas City Chiefs of the National Football League (NFL). He played college football for the Florida Gators.

== College career ==
A 3-star offensive tackle recruit, Johnson committed to play college football for the University of Florida over offers from Marshall, Miami, Nebraska, Purdue, Tennessee, and Virginia Tech.

In four seasons at Florida from 2015-2018, Johnson played in 43 games with 32 starts (4 starts at right tackle and 28 starts at right guard). Johnson started 10 games at right guard as a junior and 13 games at right guard as a senior.

While at Florida, Johnson earned his Bachelor’s degree in Agricultural & Life Sciences. He was named to the 2018 SEC Football Community Service team due to his volunteer efforts in the Gainesville, Florida community, including at local elementary and middle schools, Habitat for Humanity, and the Boys & Girls Clubs of America.

== Professional career ==
Pre-draft measurables
Height	Weight	Arm length	Hand span	Wingspan	40-yard dash	10-yard split	20-yard split	20-yard shuttle	Three-cone drill	Vertical jump	Broad jump	Bench press
6 ft 7 1/8 in (2.01 m)	326 lb (148 kg)	34 in (0.86 m)	10 5/8 in (0.27 m)	7 ft 0 1/2 in (2.15 m)	5.32 s	1.87 s	3.13 s	5.09 s	7.91 s	24.5 in (0.62 m)	8 ft 8 in (2.64 m)	20 reps
All values from NFL Combine/Pro Day

=== Pittsburgh Steelers ===
Johnson signed with the Pittsburgh Steelers as an undrafted free agent on May 2, 2019. After making the Steelers initial 53-man roster, he was waived on October 11.

=== Cincinnati Bengals ===
On October 14, 2019, Johnson was claimed off waivers by the Cincinnati Bengals.

Johnson was placed on the reserve/COVID-19 list by the team on November 6, 2020, and activated on November 20.

On March 14, 2022, the Bengals placed a restricted free agent tender on Johnson. However, on March 22, after signing the tender, Johnson was released.

=== Tampa Bay Buccaneers ===
On April 4, 2022, Johnson signed with the Tampa Bay Buccaneers. He was waived by the Buccaneers on November 1.

=== Philadelphia Eagles (first stint) ===
On November 8, 2022, Johnson was signed to the practice squad of the Philadelphia Eagles. The Eagles advanced to Super Bowl LVII, where they were defeated by the Kansas City Chiefs.

On February 15, 2023, Johnson signed a reserve/future contract with the Eagles. Johnson won the backup tackle position in training camp and signed a two year contract. Johnson played in the Eagles week 18 loss to the Giants as they rested their starters for the playoffs.

In week 3 of the 2024 season, Johnson and Tyler Steen stepped in for the second half of the Eagles 15-12 win over the Saints, after starting right tackle Lane Johnson and starting right guard Mekhi Becton both left the game injured, paving the way for two fourth quarter rushing touchdowns for Saquon Barkley. Johnson again played in the regular season finale again against the Giants as the Eagles starters rested; this time, the Eagles won the game to finish with a franchise-tying 14 wins. He won a Super Bowl championship when the Eagles defeated the Kansas City Chiefs 40–22 in Super Bowl LIX.

=== Jacksonville Jaguars ===
On March 19, 2025, Johnson signed a one-year contract with the Jacksonville Jaguars.

=== Philadelphia Eagles (second stint) ===
On August 25, 2025, Johnson was traded to the Philadelphia Eagles in exchange for a 2026 seventh-round pick.

On March 25, 2026, Johnson re-signed with the Eagles on a one-year contract. On November 13, Johnson was released.

=== Kansas City Chiefs ===
On November 18, 2026, Johnson signed with the Kansas City Chiefs practice squad.
