= Vosean Joseph =

American gridiron football player (born 1997)

Massachusetts Pirates
- Position: Linebacker
- Roster status: Active

Personal information
- Born: December 15, 1997 (age 28); Miami, Florida, U.S.
- Listed height: 6 ft 1 in (1.85 m)
- Listed weight: 226 lb (103 kg)

Career information
- High school: Miami Norland (Miami Gardens, Florida)
- College: Florida (2016–2018)
- NFL draft: 2019: 5th round, 147th overall pick

Career history
- Buffalo Bills (2019); Hamilton Tiger-Cats (2022); Massachusetts Pirates (2025–present)

Career CFL statistics
- Total tackles: 15
- Sacks: 1
- fumbles: 0
- Interceptions: 0
- Stats at Pro Football Reference

Vosean Joseph (born December 15, 1997) is an American professional football linebacker for the Massachusetts Pirates of the Indoor Football League (IFL). He played college football for the Florida Gators.

== Early life ==
Joseph attended Miami Norland Senior High School in Miami, Florida. He committed to the University of Florida to play college football.

== College career ==
Joseph played at Florida from 2016 to 2018. During his career, he had 161 tackles, four sacks and one interception. After his junior season in 2018, he entered the 2019 NFL draft.

== Professional career ==
Pre-draft measurables
Height	Weight	Arm length	Hand span	20-yard shuttle	Three-cone drill	Vertical jump	Broad jump	Bench press
6 ft 1 1/2 in (1.87 m)	230 lb (104 kg)	31 3/8 in (0.80 m)	9 5/8 in (0.24 m)	4.75 s	7.64 s	28.0 in (0.71 m)	8 ft 10 in (2.69 m)	14 reps
All values from NFL Combine/Pro Day

=== Buffalo Bills ===
Joseph was selected by the Buffalo Bills in the fifth round, 147th overall, of the 2019 NFL draft. He was placed on injured reserve on August 31, 2019.

On September 4, 2020, Joseph was waived by the Bills.

=== Hamilton Tiger-Cats ===
Joseph signed with the Hamilton Tiger-Cats of the Canadian Football League for the 2022 season.

=== Massachusetts Pirates ===
On March 16, 2025, Joseph signed with the Massachusetts Pirates of the Indoor Football League (IFL).
