= Zachary Carter (American football) =

American football player (born 1999)

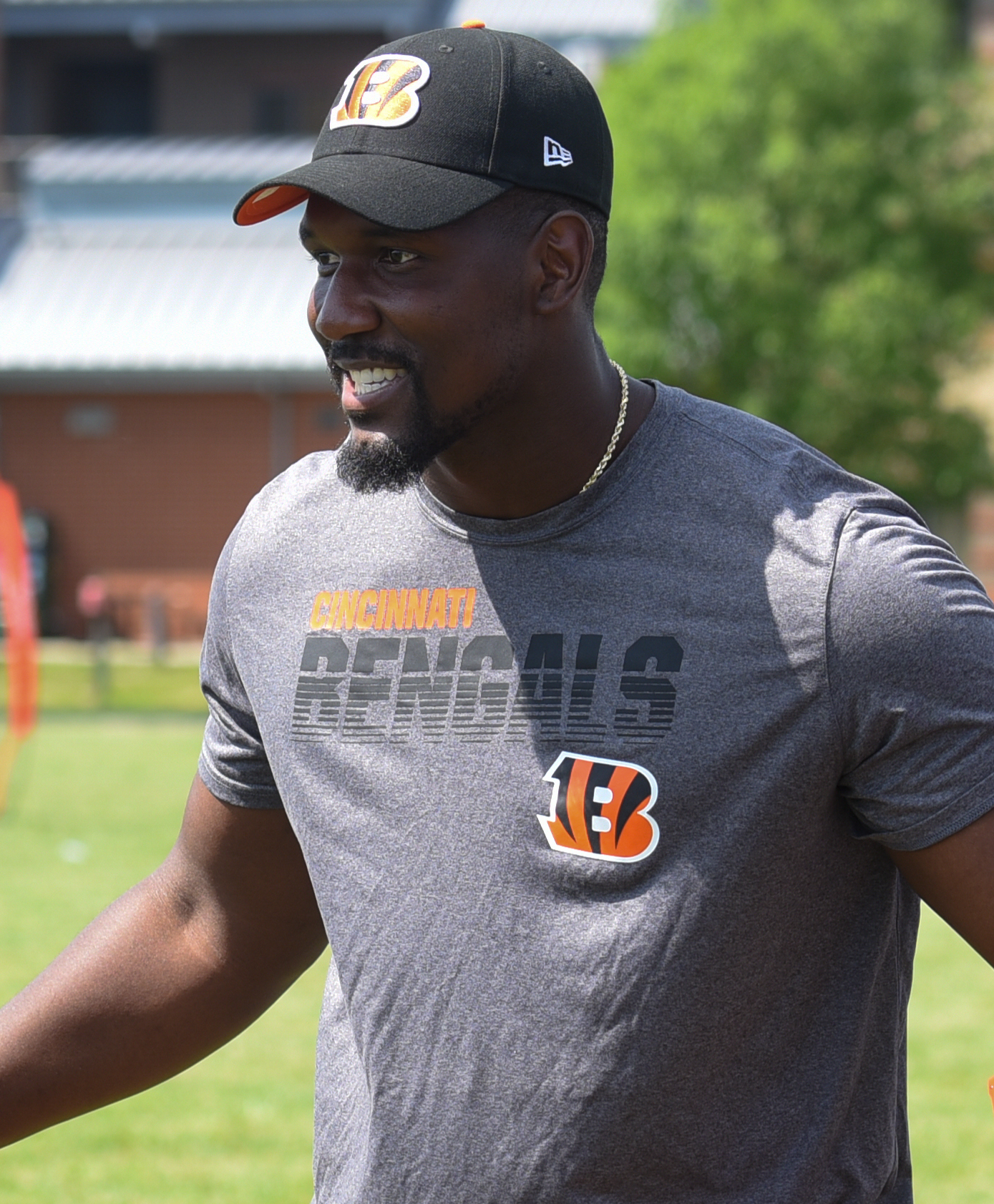
- Carter with the Cincinnati Bengals in 2022

No. 90 – Arizona Cardinals
- Position: Defensive tackle
- Roster status: Injured reserve

Personal information
- Born: April 7, 1999 (age 27); Tampa, Florida, U.S.
- Listed height: 6 ft 4 in (1.93 m)
- Listed weight: 301 lb (137 kg)

Career information
- High school: Hillsborough (Tampa)
- College: Florida (2017–2021)
- NFL draft: 2022: 3rd round, 95th overall pick

Career history
- Cincinnati Bengals (2022–2024); Las Vegas Raiders (2024); Arizona Cardinals (2025–present)

Career NFL statistics as of 2025
- Total tackles: 81
- Sacks: 2
- Forced fumbles: 2
- Pass deflections: 3
- Stats at Pro Football Reference

Zachary Carter (born April 7, 1999) is an American professional football defensive tackle for the Arizona Cardinals of the National Football League (NFL). He played college football for the Florida Gators and was selected by the Cincinnati Bengals in the third round of the 2022 NFL draft.

== Early life ==
Carter grew up in Tampa, Florida and attended Hillsborough High School. Carter was rated a four-star recruit and committed to play college football at Florida.

== College career ==
Carter redshirted his true freshman season. He played in nine games as a reserve defensive lineman in his redshirt freshman season and had eight tackles, one tackle for loss, and two passes broken up. Carter led the Gators with five sacks and 9.5 tackles for loss as a redshirt junior. Carter considered entering the 2021 NFL draft, but opted to stay at Florida for his redshirt senior season.

== Professional career ==
Pre-draft measurables
Height	Weight	Arm length	Hand span	Wingspan	40-yard dash	10-yard split	20-yard split	20-yard shuttle	Three-cone drill	Vertical jump	Broad jump	Bench press
6 ft 4 1/4 in (1.94 m)	282 lb (128 kg)	33 1/2 in (0.85 m)	10 1/4 in (0.26 m)	6 ft 8 3/8 in (2.04 m)	4.99 s	1.73 s	2.87 s	4.56 s	7.34 s	27.5 in (0.70 m)	9 ft 2 in (2.79 m)	19 reps
All values from NFL Combine/Pro Day

=== Cincinnati Bengals ===
Carter was selected by the Cincinnati Bengals in the third round, 95th overall, of the 2022 NFL draft.

Carter was waived by the Bengals on October 4, 2024.

=== Las Vegas Raiders ===
On October 10, 2024, Carter was signed to the Las Vegas Raiders' practice squad. He was promoted to the active roster on October 21.

On March 18, 2025, Carter was re-signed by the Raiders. He was waived on August 26 as part of final roster cuts.

=== Arizona Cardinals ===
On September 17, 2025, Carter was signed to the Arizona Cardinals' practice squad. He was promoted to the active roster on December 27.

On August 30, 2026, Carter was placed on injured reserve due to a knee injury.

== NFL career statistics ==
Legend
**Bold**	Career high

=== Regular season ===
Year	Team	Games		Tackles					Interceptions						Fumbles				
Year	Team	GP	GS	Cmb	Solo	Ast	Sck	TFL	Int	Yds	Avg	Lng	TD	PD	FF	Fum	FR	Yds	TD
2022	CIN	16	9	**23**	**10**	13	0.5	**1**	0	0	0.0	0	0	**1**	0	0	0	0	0
2023	CIN	17	5	**23**	8	**15**	0.0	**1**	0	0	0.0	0	0	**1**	**1**	0	0	0	0
2024	CIN	4	2	9	4	5	0.5	0	0	0	0.0	0	0	0	0	0	0	0	0
2024	LV	8	0	13	6	7	**1.0**	0	0	0	0.0	0	0	**1**	0	0	0	0	0
2025	ARI	4	0	13	5	8	0.0	0	0	0	0.0	0	0	0	**1**	0	0	0	0
Career		49	16	81	33	48	2.0	2	0	0	0.0	0	0	3	2	0	0	0	0

=== Postseason ===
Year	Team	Games		Tackles					Interceptions						Fumbles				
Year	Team	GP	GS	Cmb	Solo	Ast	Sck	TFL	Int	Yds	Avg	Lng	TD	PD	FF	Fum	FR	Yds	TD
2022	CIN	3	2	8	3	5	0.0	0	0	0	0.0	0	0	0	0	0	0	0	0
Career		3	2	8	3	5	0.0	0	0	0	0.0	0	0	0	0	0	0	0	0
