= 2019 Florida Gators football team =

American college football season

2019 Florida Gators football

Florida Cup champion Orange Bowl champion

Orange Bowl, W 36–28 vs. Virginia
- Conference: Southeastern Conference
- Eastern Division

Ranking
- Coaches: No. 7
- AP: No. 6
- Record: 11–2 (6–2 SEC)
- Head coach: Dan Mullen (2nd season)
- Co-offensive coordinators: Billy Gonzales (2nd season); John Hevesy (2nd season)
- Offensive scheme: Spread
- Defensive coordinator: Todd Grantham (2nd season)
- Base defense: 3–4
- Home stadium: Ben Hill Griffin Stadium

Uniform
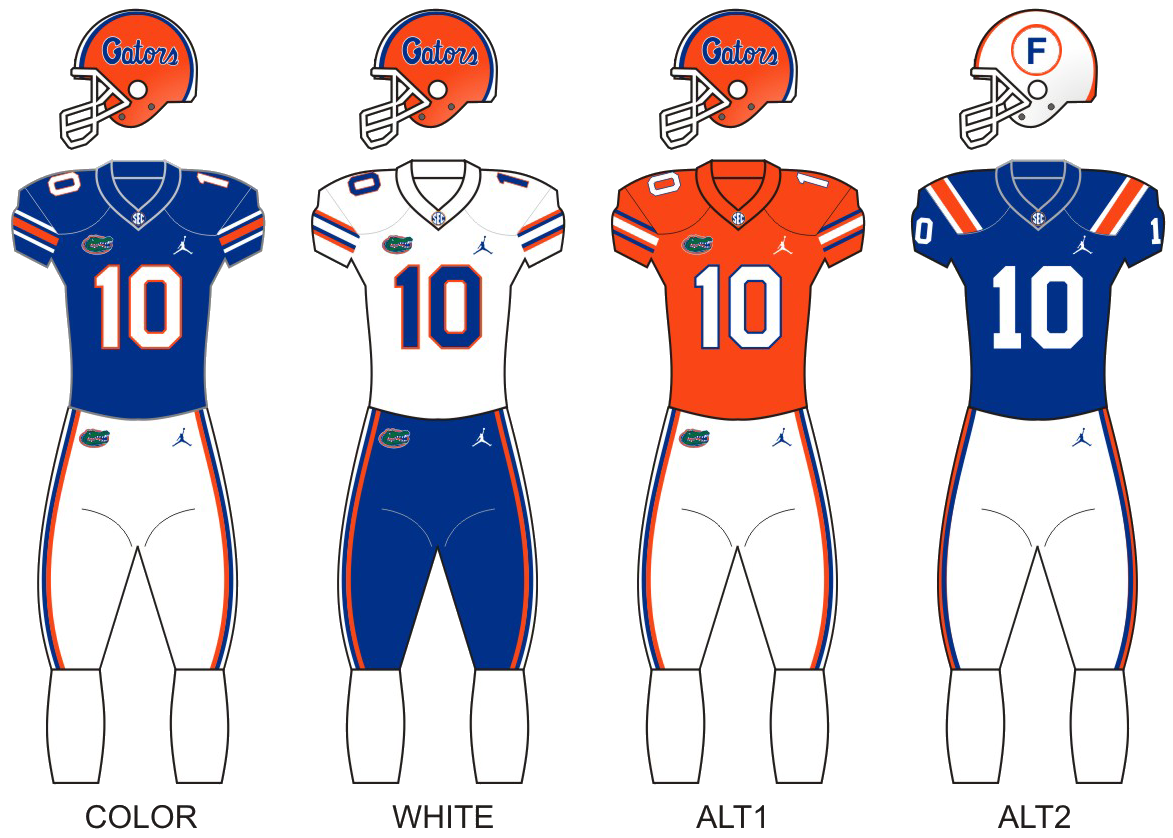

2019 Southeastern Conference football standings
	Conf.			Overall
Team	W		L	W		L
Eastern Division
No. 4 Georgia x	7	–	1	12	–	2
No. 6 Florida	6	–	2	11	–	2
Tennessee *	5	–	3	8	–	5
Kentucky	3	–	5	8	–	5
Missouri *	3	–	5	6	–	6
South Carolina	3	–	5	4	–	8
Vanderbilt	1	–	7	3	–	9
Western Division
No. 1 LSU x$#^	8	–	0	15	–	0
No. 8 Alabama	6	–	2	11	–	2
No. 14 Auburn	5	–	3	9	–	4
Texas A&M	4	–	4	8	–	5
Mississippi State	3	–	5	6	–	7
Ole Miss	2	–	6	4	–	8
Arkansas	0	–	8	2	–	10
Championship: LSU 37, Georgia 10
# – College Football Playoff champion; ^ – College Football Playoff participant; $ – Conference champion; x – Division champion/co-champions; * – Tennessee vacated all wins due to NCAA violations. Missouri was ineligible for postseason due to NCAA sanctions.; Rankings from AP Poll

The 2019 Florida Gators football team represented the University of Florida in the 2019 NCAA Division I FBS football season. The Gators played their home games at Ben Hill Griffin Stadium in Gainesville, Florida, and competed in the Eastern Division of the Southeastern Conference (SEC). They were led by second-year head coach Dan Mullen.

Coming off a 10-win season that ended in a victory in the Peach Bowl in Mullen's first year, Florida began the 2019 season ranked eighth in the preseason AP Poll. They opened the schedule by rekindling their rivalry with Miami in a game played in Orlando, winning 24–20. The Gators won their first six games, including a win over then-No. 7 Auburn, before falling on the road to then-No. 5 LSU. Three weeks later, they fell again to Georgia in Jacksonville. Florida ended the regular season in second in the East Division behind Georgia at 10–2 (6–2 SEC), and were invited to the Orange Bowl to play ACC runner-up Virginia. The Gators won the bowl game, 36–28, to end the season with 11 wins, and were ranked sixth in the final AP Poll.

Feleipe Franks began the year as the Gators' starting quarterback, but he suffered a season-ending ankle injury in the third game of the season against Kentucky. He was replaced by Kyle Trask, who finished the year with 2,941 yards and 25 touchdowns, and had the conference's second best passer rating (156.1). Tight end Kyle Pitts was named first-team all-conference. Florida's defense ranked second in the SEC in points and yards allowed, and was led by first-team all-conference defensive end Jonathan Greenard, who led the conference in sacks (10) and tackles for loss (16). Cornerback C. J. Henderson was also named first-team all-conference by the coaches.

== Preseason ==
=== Recruits ===
The Gators signed a total of 25 recruits in the 2019 recruiting class.

College recruiting (2019)
Name	Hometown	School	Height	Weight	Commit date
Trent Whittemore; S	Gainesville, Florida	Buchholz High School	6 ft 3 in (1.91 m)	190 lb (86 kg)	May 28, 2017
Trent Whittemore; S	Recruit ratings: Scout: Rivals: 247Sports: ESPN:				
Wardrick Wilson; OT	Miami, Florida	Carol City High School	6 ft 4 in (1.93 m)	305 lb (138 kg)	Jul 21, 2017
Wardrick Wilson; OT	Recruit ratings: Scout: Rivals: 247Sports: ESPN:				
Ja'markis Weston; WR	Clewiston, Florida	Clewiston High School	6 ft 3 in (1.91 m)	205 lb (93 kg)	Jul 28, 2017
Ja'markis Weston; WR	Recruit ratings: Scout: Rivals: 247Sports: ESPN:				
Dionte Marks; WR	DeLand, Florida	DeLand High School	5 ft 11 in (1.80 m)	178 lb (81 kg)	Feb 24, 2018
Dionte Marks; WR	Recruit ratings: Scout: Rivals: 247Sports: ESPN:				
Ethan White; OT	Clearwater, Florida	Clearwater High School	6 ft 5 in (1.96 m)	390 lb (180 kg)	Mar 23, 2018
Ethan White; OT	Recruit ratings: Scout: Rivals: 247Sports: ESPN:				
Jalon Jones; QB	Richmond, Virginia	Henrico High School	6 ft 3 in (1.91 m)	205 lb (93 kg)	Apr 7, 2018
Jalon Jones; QB	Recruit ratings: Scout: Rivals: 247Sports: ESPN:				
Tyron Hopper; LB	Roswell, Georgia	Roswell High School	6 ft 2 in (1.88 m)	205 lb (93 kg)	Apr 26, 2018
Tyron Hopper; LB	Recruit ratings: Scout: Rivals: 247Sports: ESPN:				
Jaelin Humphries; DT	Lawrenceville, GA	Mountain View High School	6 ft 3 in (1.91 m)	303 lb (137 kg)	Jun 5, 2018
Jaelin Humphries; DT	Recruit ratings: Scout: Rivals: 247Sports: ESPN:				
Riley Simonds; OG	Buford, Georgia	Buford High School	6 ft 4 in (1.93 m)	290 lb (130 kg)	Jun 20, 2018
Riley Simonds; OG	Recruit ratings: Scout: Rivals: 247Sports: ESPN:				
Jesiah Pierre; LB	Mount Dora, Florida	Mount Dora Christian Academy	6 ft 2 in (1.88 m)	220 lb (100 kg)	Jul 1, 2018
Jesiah Pierre; LB	Recruit ratings: Scout: Rivals: 247Sports: ESPN:				
Chester Kimbrough; CB	New Orleans, Louisiana	Warren Easton High School	5 ft 10 in (1.78 m)	167 lb (76 kg)	Aug 13, 2018
Chester Kimbrough; CB	Recruit ratings: Scout: Rivals: 247Sports: ESPN:				
Mohamoud Diabate; LB	Auburn, Alabama	Auburn High School	6 ft 4 in (1.93 m)	220 lb (100 kg)	Aug 22, 2018
Mohamoud Diabate; LB	Recruit ratings: Scout: Rivals: 247Sports: ESPN:				
William Harrod; OT	Fort Washington, Maryland	National Christian Academy	6 ft 5 in (1.96 m)	312 lb (142 kg)	Sep 3, 2018
William Harrod; OT	Recruit ratings: Scout: Rivals: 247Sports: ESPN:				
Jaydon Hill; CB	Madison, Alabama	Bob Jones High School	6 ft 0 in (1.83 m)	174 lb (79 kg)	Sep 6, 2018
Jaydon Hill; CB	Recruit ratings: Scout: Rivals: 247Sports: ESPN:				
Nay'Quan Wright; RB	Miami, Florida	Carol City High School	5 ft 8 in (1.73 m)	188 lb (85 kg)	Nov 24, 2018
Nay'Quan Wright; RB	Recruit ratings: Scout: Rivals: 247Sports: ESPN:				
Kingsley Eguakun; OG	Jacksonville, Florida	Sandalwood High School	6 ft 3 in (1.91 m)	293 lb (133 kg)	Dec 2, 2018
Kingsley Eguakun; OG	Recruit ratings: Scout: Rivals: 247Sports: ESPN:				
Michael Tarquin; OT	Citra, Florida	North Marion High School	6 ft 6 in (1.98 m)	290 lb (130 kg)	Dec 3, 2018
Michael Tarquin; OT	Recruit ratings: Scout: Rivals: 247Sports: ESPN:				
Keon Zipperer; TE	Lakeland, Florida	Lakeland High School	6 ft 2 in (1.88 m)	240 lb (110 kg)	Dec 19, 2018
Keon Zipperer; TE	Recruit ratings: Scout: Rivals: 247Sports: ESPN:				
Lloyd Summerall; DE	Lakeland, Florida	Lakeland High School	6 ft 5 in (1.96 m)	220 lb (100 kg)	Dec 19, 2018
Lloyd Summerall; DE	Recruit ratings: Scout: Rivals: 247Sports: ESPN:				
Deyavie Hammond; OG	Lakeland, Florida	Lakeland High School	6 ft 3 in (1.91 m)	353 lb (160 kg)	Dec 19, 2018
Deyavie Hammond; OG	Recruit ratings: Scout: Rivals: 247Sports: ESPN:				
Chris Steele; CB	Bellflower, California	St. John Bosco High School	6 ft 1 in (1.85 m)	181 lb (82 kg)	Jan 5, 2019
Chris Steele; CB	Recruit ratings: Scout: Rivals: 247Sports: ESPN:				
Diwun Black; ILB	Kissimmee, Florida	Osceola High School	6 ft 3 in (1.91 m)	216 lb (98 kg)	Aug 2, 2018
Diwun Black; ILB	Recruit ratings: Scout: Rivals: 247Sports: ESPN:				
Arjei Henderson; WR	Richmond, Texas	Fort Bend Travis High School	6 ft 1 in (1.85 m)	183 lb (83 kg)	Jan 3, 2019
Arjei Henderson; WR	Recruit ratings: Scout: Rivals: 247Sports: ESPN:				
Khris Bogle; DE	Fort Lauderdale, Florida	Cardinal Gibbons High School	6 ft 3 in (1.91 m)	212 lb (96 kg)	Feb 6, 2019
Khris Bogle; DE	Recruit ratings: Scout: Rivals: 247Sports: ESPN:				
Kaiir Elam; CB	North Palm Beach, Florida	The Benjamin School	6 ft 1 in (1.85 m)	182 lb (83 kg)	Feb 6, 2019
Kaiir Elam; CB	Recruit ratings: Scout: Rivals: 247Sports: ESPN:				
Overall recruit ranking:
Note: In many cases, Scout, Rivals, 247Sports, On3, and ESPN may conflict in their listings of height and weight.; In these cases, the average was taken. ESPN grades are on a 100-point scale.; Sources: "Florida Football Commitments". Rivals.; "2019 Team Ranking". Rivals.com.

=== SEC Media Days ===
The 2019 SEC Media Days were held July 15–18 in Birmingham, Alabama. In the preseason media poll, Florida was projected to finish in second behind Georgia in the East Division.

=== Preseason All-SEC teams ===
The Gators had seven players selected to the preseason all-SEC teams.

Offense

2nd team

La'Mical Perine – RB

Defense

1st team

Jabari Zuniga– DL

C. J. Henderson – DB

2nd team

David Reese II – LB

Specialists

2nd team

Tommy Townsend – P

Kadarius Toney – All-purpose

3rd team

Evan McPherson – K

== Schedule ==
Florida announced its 2019 football schedule on September 18, 2018. The 2019 schedule consisted of 6 home, 4 away, and 2 neutral games in the regular season.

Date	Time	Opponent	Rank	Site	TV	Result	Attendance
August 24	7:00 p.m.	vs. Miami (FL)*	No. 8	Camping World Stadium; Orlando, FL (Camping World Kickoff / Florida Cup / rivalry / College GameDay / SEC Nation)	ESPN	W 24–20	66,543
September 7	7:30 p.m.	UT Martin*	No. 11	Ben Hill Griffin Stadium; Gainesville, FL	ESPNU	W 45–0	80,007
September 14	7:00 p.m.	at Kentucky	No. 9	Kroger Field; Lexington, KY (SEC Nation) (rivalry)	ESPN	W 29–21	63,076
September 21	12:00 p.m.	Tennessee	No. 9	Ben Hill Griffin Stadium; Gainesville, FL (rivalry)	ESPN	W 34–3	82,276
September 28	4:00 p.m.	No. 10 (FCS) Towson*	No. 9	Ben Hill Griffin Stadium; Gainesville, FL	SECN	W 38–0	79,126
October 5	3:30 p.m.	No. 7 Auburn^{†}	No. 10	Ben Hill Griffin Stadium; Gainesville, FL (rivalry / College GameDay)	CBS	W 24–13	90,584
October 12	8:00 p.m.	at No. 5 LSU	No. 7	Tiger Stadium; Baton Rouge, LA (rivalry / College GameDay)	ESPN	L 28–42	102,321
October 19	12:00 p.m.	at South Carolina	No. 9	Williams–Brice Stadium; Columbia, SC	ESPN	W 38–27	78,883
November 2	3:30 p.m.	vs. No. 8 Georgia	No. 6	TIAA Bank Field; Jacksonville, FL (rivalry / SEC Nation)	CBS	L 17–24	84,789
November 9	12:00 p.m.	Vanderbilt	No. 10	Ben Hill Griffin Stadium; Gainesville, FL	ESPN	W 56–0	86,201
November 16	12:00 p.m.	at Missouri	No. 11	Faurot Field; Columbia, MO	CBS	W 23–6	57,280
November 30	7:30 p.m.	Florida State*	No. 11	Ben Hill Griffin Stadium; Gainesville, FL (Florida Cup / rivalry)	SECN	W 40–17	89,409
December 30	8:00 p.m.	vs. No. 24 Virginia*	No. 9	Hard Rock Stadium; Miami Gardens, FL (Orange Bowl)	ESPN	W 36–28	65,157
*Non-conference game; ^{†}Homecoming; Rankings from AP Poll and CFP Rankings after November 5 released prior to game; All times are in Eastern time

Schedule source:

== Rankings ==
Ranking movements Legend: ██ Increase in ranking ██ Decrease in ranking
	Week																
Poll	Pre	1	2	3	4	5	6	7	8	9	10	11	12	13	14	15	Final
AP	8	11	9	9	9	10	7	9	7	6	10	11	10	8	7	6	6
Coaches	8	10	8	8	8	8	7	9	8	6	11	12	10	8	7	7	7
CFP	Not released										10	11	11	11	9	9	Not released

== Game summaries ==
=== Miami (FL) ===
	1	2	3	4	Total
Miami (FL)	3	10	0	7	20
No. 8 Florida	7	0	10	7	24

Scoring summary

Quarter	Time	Drive			Team	Scoring information	Score	
Quarter	Time	Plays	Yards	TOP	Team	Scoring information	Miami	Florida
1	9:37	9	56	5:23	Miami	36-yard field goal by Bubba Baxa	3	0
1	7:37	5	79	2:00	Florida	Kadarius Toney 66-yard touchdown reception from Feleipe Franks, Evan McPherson kick good	3	7
2	8:26	5	27	2:20	Miami	42-yard field goal by Bubba Baxa	6	7
2	0:45	12	90	6:08	Miami	Brevin Jordan 25-yard touchdown reception from Jarren Williams, Bubba Baxa kick good	13	7
3	6:30	9	33	3:25	Florida	27-yard field goal by Evan McPherson	13	10
3	0:30	3	11	0:43	Florida	La'Mical Perine 8-yard touchdown reception from Feleipe Franks, Evan McPherson kick good	13	17
4	14:15	3	75	1:15	Miami	DeeJay Dallas 50-yard touchdown run, Bubba Baxa kick good	20	17
4	8:18	4	80	1:30	Florida	Feleipe Franks 3-yard touchdown run, Evan McPherson kick good	20	24
"TOP" = time of possession. For other American football terms, see Glossary of American football.							20	24

Uniform Combination
Helmet	Jersey	Pants

=== UT Martin ===
	1	2	3	4	Total
UT Martin	0	0	0	0	0
No. 11 Florida	3	14	14	14	45

Scoring summary

Quarter	Time	Drive			Team	Scoring information	Score	
Quarter	Time	Plays	Yards	TOP	Team	Scoring information	UT-Martin	Florida
1	8:45	9	37	4:01	Florida	32-yard field goal by Evan McPherson	0	3
2	8:35	5	92	2:15	Florida	Van Jefferson 69-yard touchdown reception from Feleipe Franks, Evan McPherson kick good	0	10
2	5:00	4	55	1:51	Florida	Tyrie Cleveland 35-yard touchdown reception from Felepie Franks, Evan McPherson kick good	0	17
3	11:52	7	51	3:08	Florida	Malik Davis 1-yard touchdown run, Evan McPherson kick good	0	24
3	4:49	11	66	5:33	Florida	La'Mical Perine 5-yard touchdown run, Evan McPherson kick good	0	31
4	14:55	6	43	2:17	Florida	Jacob Copeland 9-yard touchdown reception from Kyle Trask, Evan McPherson kick good	0	38
4	3:55	6	78	2:13	Florida	Emory Jones 16-yard touchdown run, Chris Howard kick good	0	45
"TOP" = time of possession. For other American football terms, see Glossary of American football.							0	45

Uniform Combination
Helmet	Jersey	Pants

=== At Kentucky ===
	1	2	3	4	Total
No. 9 Florida	7	0	3	19	29
Kentucky	0	14	7	0	21

Scoring summary

Quarter	Time	Drive			Team	Scoring information	Score	
Quarter	Time	Plays	Yards	TOP	Team	Scoring information	Florida	Kentucky
1	6:27	8	31	5:03	Florida	Freddie Swain 15-yard touchdown reception from Feleipe Franks, Evan McPherson kick good	7	0
2	14:16	12	79	7:11	Kentucky	Ahmad Wagner 26-yard touchdown reception from Sawyer Smith, Chance Poore kick good	7	7
2	7:46	11	54	5:57	Kentucky	Sawyer Smith 1-yard touchdown run, Chance Poore kick good	7	14
3	7:50	4	6	2:02	Florida	32-yard field goal by Evan McPherson	10	14
3	5:39	6	75	2:11	Kentucky	Keaton Upshaw 13-yard touchdown reception from Sawyer Smith, Chance Poore kick good	10	21
4	12:41	6	62	2:15	Florida	La'Mical Perine 8-yard touchdown run, 2-point {{{2pt type}}} {{{2pt result}}}	16	21
4	4:11	4	66	1:54	Florida	Kyle Trask 4-yard touchdown run, 2-point {{{2pt type}}} {{{2pt result}}}	22	21
4	0:33	3	80	0:21	Florida	Josh Hammond 76-yard touchdown run, Evan McPherson kick good	29	21
"TOP" = time of possession. For other American football terms, see Glossary of American football.							29	21

Uniform Combination
Helmet	Jersey	Pants

=== Tennessee ===
	1	2	3	4	Total
Tennessee	0	0	3	0	3
No. 9 Florida	7	10	7	10	34

Scoring summary

Quarter	Time	Drive			Team	Scoring information	Score	
Quarter	Time	Plays	Yards	TOP	Team	Scoring information	Tennessee	Florida
1	12:44	5	75	2:16	Florida	Kyle Pitts 19-yard touchdown reception from Kyle Trask, Evan McPherson kick good	0	7
2	10:02	6	41	2:08	Florida	22-yard field goal by Evan McPherson	0	10
2	0:00	9	61	4:56	Florida	La'Mical Perine 1-yard touchdown run, Evan McPherson kick good	0	17
3	11:24	11	52	3:36	Tennessee	40-yard field goal by Brent Cimaglia	3	17
3	9:11	6	75	2:13	Florida	Freddie Swain 29-yard touchdown reception from Kyle Trask, Evan McPherson kick good	3	24
4	11:31	8	64	3:20	Florida	Dameon Pierce 10-yard touchdown run, Evan McPherson kick good	3	31
4	2:21	14	46	7:03	Florida	37-yard field goal by Evan McPherson	3	34
"TOP" = time of possession. For other American football terms, see Glossary of American football.							3	34

Uniform Combination
Helmet	Jersey	Pants

=== Towson ===
	1	2	3	4	Total
No. 10 (FCS) Towson	0	0	0	0	0
No. 9 Florida	7	10	14	7	38

Scoring summary

Quarter	Time	Drive			Team	Scoring information	Score	
Quarter	Time	Plays	Yards	TOP	Team	Scoring information	Towson	Florida
1	9:28	12	82	5:32	Florida	Kyle Pitts 5-yard touchdown reception from Kyle Trask, Evan McPherson kick good	0	7
2	14:55	8	50	3:44	Florida	42-yard field goal by Evan McPherson	0	10
2	3:46	8	80	4:08	Florida	Kyle Trask 1-yard touchdown run, Evan McPherson kick good	0	17
3	9:19	2	7	0:12	Florida	Kyle Pitts 7-yard touchdown reception from Kyle Trask, Evan McPherson kick good	0	24
3	4:50	6	66	2:28	Florida	Dameon Pierce 37-yard touchdown run, Evan McPherson kick good	0	31
4	9:47	7	69	4:21	Florida	Keon Zipperer 2-yard touchdown reception from Emory Jones, Chris Howard kick good	0	38
"TOP" = time of possession. For other American football terms, see Glossary of American football.							0	38

Uniform Combination
Helmet	Jersey	Pants

=== Auburn ===
	1	2	3	4	Total
No. 7 Auburn	6	7	0	0	13
No. 10 Florida	7	10	0	7	24

Scoring summary

Quarter	Time	Drive			Team	Scoring information	Score	
Quarter	Time	Plays	Yards	TOP	Team	Scoring information	Auburn	Florida
1	13:12	2	64	0:40	Florida	Freddie Swain 64-yard touchdown reception from Kyle Trask, Evan McPherson kick good	0	7
1	7:11	4	9	1:37	Auburn	48-yard field goal by Anders Carlson	3	7
1	3:01	7	23	3:13	Auburn	39-yard field goal by Anders Carlson	6	7
2	13:28	2	18	0:45	Florida	Josh Hammond 13-yard touchdown reception from Kyle Trask, Evan McPherson kick good	6	14
2	10:23	1	32	0:07	Auburn	Seth Williams 32-yard touchdown reception from Bo Nix, Anders Carlson kick good	13	14
2	5:49	10	51	4:34	Florida	41-yard field goal by Evan McPherson	13	17
4	9:04	1	88	0:15	Florida	La'Mical Perine 88-yard touchdown run, Evan McPherson kick good	13	24
"TOP" = time of possession. For other American football terms, see Glossary of American football.							13	24

Uniform Combination*
Helmet	Jersey	Pants

- Special throwback uniform

=== At LSU ===
	1	2	3	4	Total
No. 7 Florida	7	14	7	0	28
No. 5 LSU	7	14	14	7	42

Scoring summary

Quarter	Time	Drive			Team	Scoring information	Score	
Quarter	Time	Plays	Yards	TOP	Team	Scoring information	Florida	LSU
1	9:55	2	66	0:32	LSU	Ja'Marr Chase 9-yard touchdown reception from Joe Burrow, Cade York kick good	0	7
1	3:34	12	75	6:21	Florida	Trevon Grimes 5-yard touchdown reception from Kyle Trask, Evan McPherson kick good	7	7
2	12:44	5	82	2:09	LSU	Justin Jefferson 7-yard touchdown reception from Joe Burrow, Cade York kick good	7	14
2	5:48	13	75	6:56	Florida	La'Mical Perine 1-yard touchdown reception from Emory Jones, Evan McPherson kick good	14	14
2	3:55	4	75	1:53	LSU	Clyde Edwards-Helaire 39-yard touchdown run, Cade York kick good	14	21
2	0:04	11	75	3:51	Florida	Van Jefferson 6-yard touchdown reception from Kyle Trask, Evan McPherson kick good	21	21
3	10:54	8	76	4:06	Florida	Van Jefferson 2-yard touchdown reception from Kyle Trask, Evan McPherson kick good	28	21
3	7:12	8	75	3:42	LSU	Clyde Edwards-Helaire 5-yard touchdown run, Cade York kick good	28	28
3	3:15	3	52	1:41	LSU	Tyrion Davis-Price 33-yard touchdown run, Cade York kick good	28	35
4	5:43	4	80	1:43	LSU	Ja'Marr Chase 54-yard touchdown reception from Joe Burrow, Cade York kick good	28	42
"TOP" = time of possession. For other American football terms, see Glossary of American football.							28	42

Uniform Combination
Helmet	Jersey	Pants

=== At South Carolina ===
	1	2	3	4	Total
No. 9 Florida	3	7	7	21	38
South Carolina	7	3	10	7	27

Scoring summary

Quarter	Time	Drive			Team	Scoring information	Score	
Quarter	Time	Plays	Yards	TOP	Team	Scoring information	Florida	South Carolina
1	9:59	8	75	5:01	South Carolina	Mon Denson 1-yard touchdown run, Parker White kick good	0	7
1	4:06	6	44	2:16	Florida	48-yard field goal by Evan McPherson	3	7
2	14:06	6	45	2:03	South Carolina	49-yard field goal by Parker White	3	10
2	10:08	8	75	3:58	Florida	Jacob Copeland 37-yard touchdown reception from Kyle Trask, Evan McPherson kick good	10	10
3	13:57	3	20	0:45	South Carolina	Tavien Feaster 21-yard touchdown run, Parker White kick good	10	17
3	13:43	1	75	0:14	Florida	Dameon Pierce 75-yard touchdown run, Evan McPherson kick good	17	17
3	3:16	12	72	6:22	South Carolina	31-yard field goal by Parker White	17	20
4	9:54	7	52	3:35	Florida	Freddie Swain 25-yard touchdown reception from Kyle Trask, Evan McPherson kick good	24	20
4	7:53	3	29	0:51	Florida	Kyle Pitts 5-yard touchdown reception from Kyle Trask, Evan McPherson kick goo	31	20
4	4:02	6	37	3:10	Florida	Trevon Grimes 5-yard touchdown reception from Kyle Trask, Evan McPherson kick good	38	20
4	1:53	8	75	2:09	South Carolina	OrTre Smith 4-yard touchdown reception from Ryan Hilinski, Parker White kick good	38	27
"TOP" = time of possession. For other American football terms, see Glossary of American football.							38	27

Uniform Combination
Helmet	Jersey	Pants

=== Georgia ===
Georgia Bulldogs vs. Florida Gators – Game summary

Quarter	1	2	3	4	Total
No. 8 Georgia	3	10	3	8	24
No. 6 Florida	0	3	0	14	17

at TIAA Bank Field • Jacksonville, Florida

- Date: November 2, 2019
- Game time: 3:30 p.m.
- Game weather: Temperature: 64 °F (18 °C), Cloudy, NW 11 MPH
- Game attendance: 84,789
- Referee: David Smith
- TV announcers (CBS): Brad Nessler, Gary Danielson, and Jamie Erdahl

Game information

First Quarter

- Georgia – Rodrigo Blankenship 31-yard field goal, 3:58

Second Quarter

- Georgia – Dominick Blaylock 3-yard pass from Jake Fromm (Rodrigo Blankenship kick), 4:43
- Florida – Evan McPherson 38-yard field goal, 2:40
- Georgia – Rodrigo Blankenship 37-yard field goal, 0:14

Third Quarter

- Georgia – Rodrigo Blankenship 27-yard field goal, 9:45

Fourth Quarter

- Florida – Van Jefferson 23-yard pass from Kyle Trask (Evan McPherson kick), 13:51
- Georgia – Lawrence Cager 52-yard pass from Jake Fromm (Lawrence Cager pass), 10:01
- Florida – Freddie Swain 2-yard pass from Kyle Trask (Evan McPherson kick), 3:11

After its road victory against South Carolina, Florida faced Georgia in the 97th iteration of their rivalry game, played at the neutral site TIAA Bank Field in Jacksonville. Georgia won 24–17 to extend its series winning streak to three games.

Georgia won the opening coin toss and elected to defer to the second half. On the opening drive, Florida converted a third down, but Georgia took over at their own 40-yard line after an incomplete pass by Kyle Trask on fourth and inches. On their sixteen-play drive, Georgia made four third down conversions and scored first with a field goal by Rodrigo Blankenship. The next Florida drive was a three-and-out, with Trask being sacked once, but Georgia's next drive was stopped by the Florida defense and they were forced to punt. After another three-and-out by Florida, Georgia marched down the field with three third down conversions, ending their drive with a touchdown pass from Jake Fromm to Dominick Blaylock to bring the score to 10–0 with under five minutes left in the first half. Florida answered with an Evan McPherson field goal, but this was negated by another Blankenship field goal near the end of the half, bringing the score to 13–3 in favor of Georgia.

To open the second half, Georgia made a nine-play drive that included a one-handed catch by Brian Herrien of a pass from Fromm, capping it with Blankenship's third field goal of the game to extend their lead to 13 points. Both teams punted on their next drives, but Florida rallied with a nine-play drive that resulted in their first touchdown, made by Van Jefferson off a 23-yard pass by Trask. This narrowed the score differential to a touchdown with just under fourteen minutes left in the game, but on the next drive Georgia pulled away when Lawrence Cager completed a 52-yard pass from Jake Fromm for a touchdown. Together with a successful 2-point attempt, also from Fromm to Cager, this extended the Georgia lead to fourteen points. A 75-yard Florida drive ended with a Trask 2-yard touchdown pass to Freddie Swain with just over three minutes remaining in the game. Returning Florida's punt to their own 32-yard line, Georgia ran out the clock to seal their victory.

After the game, Florida dropped from sixth to tenth in the AP Top 25, while Georgia rose by two spots. Their victory gave Georgia uncontested first place in the SEC East, with now two-loss Florida in second.

Uniform Combination
Helmet	Jersey	Pants

=== Vanderbilt ===
	1	2	3	4	Total
Vanderbilt	0	0	0	0	0
No. 10 Florida	0	14	28	14	56

Scoring summary

Quarter	Time	Drive			Team	Scoring information	Score	
Quarter	Time	Plays	Yards	TOP	Team	Scoring information	Vanderbilt	Florida
2	14:54	15	82	5:18	Florida	La'Mical Perine 1-yard touchdown reception from Kyle Trask, Evan McPherson kick good	0	7
2	10:59	4	23	2:03	Florida	Kyle Trask 9-yard touchdown run, Evan McPherson kick good	0	14
3	13:16	1	66	0:13	Florida	Trevon Grimes 66-yard touchdown reception from Kyle Trask, Evan McPherson kick good	0	21
3	10:52	2	51	0:27	Florida	Kyle Pitts 15-yard touchdown reception from Kyle Trask, Evan McPherson kick good	0	28
3	5:22	–	–	–	Florida	Fumble recovery returned 80 yards for touchdown by Jonathan Greenard, Evan McPherson kick good	0	35
3	2:08	5	79	2:04	Florida	Emory Jones 13-yard touchdown run, Evan McPherson kick good	0	42
4	10:10	4	25	2:26	Florida	Emory Jones 1-yard touchdown run, Chris Howard kick good	0	49
4	1:06	7	68	2:48	Florida	Emory Jones 3-yard touchdown run, Chris Howard kick good	0	56
"TOP" = time of possession. For other American football terms, see Glossary of American football.							0	56

Uniform Combination
Helmet	Jersey	Pants

=== At Missouri ===
	1	2	3	4	Total
No. 11 Florida	3	3	14	3	23
Missouri	0	3	3	0	6

Scoring summary

Quarter	Time	Drive			Team	Scoring information	Score	
Quarter	Time	Plays	Yards	TOP	Team	Scoring information	Florida	Missouri
1	12:11	7	45	2:49	Florida	47-yard field goal by Evan McPherson	3	0
2	9:36	6	71	2:33	Missouri	37-yard field goal by Tucker McCann	3	3
2	7:34	6	53	2:02	Florida	39-yard field goal by Evan McPherson	6	3
3	11:56	3	60	1:06	Florida	Josh Hammond 34-yard touchdown reception from Kyle Trask, Evan McPherson kick good	13	3
3	6:49	7	36	2:22	Missouri	28-yard field goal by Tucker McCann	13	6
3	2:58	8	75	3:51	Florida	La'Mical Perine 15-yard touchdown reception from Kyle Trask, Evan McPherson kick good	20	6
4	10:37	8	61	3:03	Florida	22-yard field goal by Evan McPherson	23	6
"TOP" = time of possession. For other American football terms, see Glossary of American football.							23	6

Uniform Combination
Helmet	Jersey	Pants

=== Florida State ===
	1	2	3	4	Total
Florida State	7	0	10	0	17
No. 11 Florida	7	23	7	3	40

Scoring summary

Quarter	Time	Drive			Team	Scoring information	Score	
Quarter	Time	Plays	Yards	TOP	Team	Scoring information	Florida State	Florida
1	10:19	11	75	4:41	Florida	Freddie Swain 19-yard touchdown reception from Kyle Trask, Evan McPherson kick good	0	7
1	5:59	10	75	4:20	Florida State	Jordan Travis 1-yard touchdown run, Ricky Aguayo kick good	7	7
2	13:46	13	75	7:13	Florida	Dameon Pierce 1-yard touchdown run, Evan McPherson kick no good	7	13
2	10:55	3	85	1:30	Florida	Freddie Swain 23-yard touchdown reception from Kyle Trask, Evan McPherson kick good	7	20
2	5:06	5	40	1:23	Florida	Van Jefferson 13-yard touchdown reception from Kyle Trask, Evan McPherson kick good	7	27
2	0:10	8	51	1:32	Florida	50-yard field goal by Evan McPherson	7	30
3	12:13	10	44	2:47	Florida State	48-yard field goal by Ricky Aguayo	10	30
3	6:34	11	75	5:39	Florida	Van Jefferson 6-yard touchdown reception from Kyle Trask, Evan McPherson kick good	10	37
3	4:53	5	75	1:36	Florida State	Cam Akers 50-yard touchdown run, Ricky Aguayo kick good	17	37
4	14:56	11	52	4:51	Florida	21-yard field goal by Evan McPherson	17	40
"TOP" = time of possession. For other American football terms, see Glossary of American football.							17	40

Uniform Combination
Helmet	Jersey	Pants

=== Virginia ===
	1	2	3	4	Total
No. 9 Florida	14	10	3	9	36
No. 24 Virginia	7	7	0	14	28

Scoring summary

Quarter	Time	Drive			Team	Scoring information	Score	
Quarter	Time	Plays	Yards	TOP	Team	Scoring information	Florida	Virginia
1	14:20	3	75	:40	Florida	La'Mical Perine 61-yard touchdown run, Evan McPherson kick good	7	0
1	11:27	2	34	:07	Virginia	Terrell Jana 34-yard touchdown reception from Bryce Perkins, Brian Delaney kick good	7	7
1	6:26	13	75	5:01	Florida	La'Mical Perine 16-yard touchdown reception from Kyle Trask, Evan McPherson kick good	14	7
2	14:53	14	88	6:33	Virginia	Hasise Dubois 9-yard touchdown reception from Bryce Perkins, Brian Delaney kick good	14	14
2	9:39	14	73	5:14	Florida	23-yard field goal by Evan McPherson	17	14
2	2:13	9	74	5:07	Florida	La'Mical Perine 10-yard touchdown run, Evan McPherson kick good	24	14
3	0:16	8	58	2:56	Florida	49-yard field goal by Evan McPherson	27	14
4	13:05	6	75	2:11	Virginia	Joe Reed 7-yard touchdown reception from Bryce Perkins, Brian Delaney kick good	27	21
4	9:33	7	65	3:32	Florida	Kyle Trask 1-yard touchdown run, 2-point pass no good	33	21
4	2:32	7	72	2:39	Florida	42-yard field goal by Evan McPherson	36	21
4	0:38	8	75	1:54	Virginia	Hasise Dubois 2-yard touchdown reception from Bryce Perkins, Brian Delaney kick good	36	28
"TOP" = time of possession. For other American football terms, see Glossary of American football.							36	28

Uniform Combination
Helmet	Jersey	Pants

== Personnel ==
=== Roster ===
As of 9 November 2019

2019 Florida Gators roster
Quarterbacks: 5 Emory Jones – (redshirt) Freshman; 9 Luke Matthews – Freshman; 11 Kyle Trask – (redshirt) Junior; 13 Feleipe Franks – (redshirt) Junior; Running backs: 2 La’Mical Perine – Senior; 6 Nay'Quan Wright – Freshman; 20 Malik Davis – (redshirt) Sophomore; 24 Iverson Clement – (redshirt) Freshman; 27 Dameon Pierce – Sophomore; Wide receivers: 8 Trevon Grimes – Junior; 10 Josh Hammond – Senior; 12 Van Jefferson – (redshirt) Senior; 15 Jacob Copeland – (redshirt) Freshman; 16 Freddie Swain – Senior; 22 Dionte Marks – Freshman; 82 Ja'Markis Weston – Freshman; 83 Rick Wells – (redshirt) Junior; 89 Tyrie Cleveland – Senior; Tight ends: 7 Lucas Krull – (redshirt) Junior; 9 Keon Zipperer – Freshman; 45 Clifford Taylor IV – Junior; 81 Dante Lang – (redshirt) Freshman; 84 Kyle Pitts – Sophomore; 88 Kemore Gamble – (redshirt) Sophomore; Offensive line: 50 Tanner Rowell – (redshirt) Junior; 56 Jean DeLance – (redshirt) Junior; 60 Da'Quan Thomas – Freshman; 61 Brett Heggie – (redshirt) Junior; 62 Griffin McDowell – (redshirt) Freshman; 64 Riley Simonds – Freshman; 65 Kingsley Eguakun – Freshman; 66 Nick Buchanan – (redshirt) Senior; 67 Christopher Bleich – (redshirt) Freshman; 70 Michael Tarquin – Freshman; 72 Stone Forsythe – (redshirt) Junior; 74 Will Harrod – Freshman; 75 T.J. Moore – (redshirt) Sophomore; 76 Richard Gouraige – (redshirt) Freshman; 77 Ethan White – Freshman	Defensive line: 17 Zachary Carter – (redshirt) Sophomore; 55 Kyree Campbell – Junior; 56 Tedarrell Slaton – Junior; 66 Jaelin Humphries – Freshman; 88 Adam Shuler – Graduate; 91 Marlon Dunlap Jr. – (redshirt) Junior; 92 Jabari Zuniga – (redshirt) Senior; 93 Elijah Conliffe – Junior; 98 Luke Ancrum – (redshirt) Senior; Linebackers: 4 David Reese – (redshirt) Freshman; 6 Brenton Cox Jr. – Sophomore; 7 Jeremiah Moon – (redshirt) Junior; 11 Mohamoud Diabate – Freshman; 28 Ty'Ron Hopper – Freshman; 32 Jesiah Pierre – Freshman; 33 David Reese II – Senior; 34 Lacedrick Brunson – (redshirt) Sophomore; 41 James Houston – (redshirt) Sophomore; 51 Ventrell Miller – (redshirt) Sophomore; 58 Jonathan Greenard – Graduate; 90 Andrew Chatfield Jr. – (redshirt) Freshman; 97 Khris Bogle – Freshman; 99 Lloyd Summerall III – Freshman; Defensive backs: 1 C. J. Henderson– Junior; 2 Brad Stewart Jr. – Junior; 3 Marco Wilson – (redshirt) Sophomore; 5 Kaiir Elam – Freshman; 12 C.J. McWilliams – (redshirt) Junior; 13 Donovan Stiner – Junior; 14 Quincy Lenton – (redshirt) Junior; 21 Trey Dean – Sophomore; 23 Jaydon Hill – Freshman; 25 Chester Kimbrough – Freshman; 29 Jeawon Taylor – Senior; 31 Shawn Davis – Junior	Punters: 18 Jacob Finn – (redshirt) Junior; 43 Tommy Townsend – (redshirt) Senior; Placekickers: 19 Evan McPherson – Sophomore; 71 Chris Howard – (redshirt) Sophomore; Long snappers: 40 Marco Ortiz – (redshirt) Freshman; 48 Brett DioGuardi – (redshirt) Junior; 49 Jacob Tilghman – (redshirt) Senior; Athletes: 1 Kadarius Toney – Junior; 17 Nick Sproles – (redshirt) Junior; 18 Jack Anders – Freshman; 19 Jack Ruskell – (redshirt) Sophomore; 25 Erik Askeland – (redshirt) Sophomore; 26 Michael Hart – (redshirt) Senior; 27 Joshua Tse – (redshirt) Sophomore; 29 Isaac Ricks – (redshirt) Sophomore; 30 Amari Burney – Sophomore; 32 Brayton Hundley – (redshirt) Senior; 33 Daniel Cross – (redshirt) Freshman; 35 Kyle Engel – Freshman; 35 William Sawyer – Freshman; 36 Robert Clay – (redshirt) Senior; 36 Trey Thompson – (redshirt) Sophomore; 37 Patrick Moorer – (redshirt) Sophomore; 37 Tyler Waxman – Freshman; 38 Nick Oelrich – (redshirt) Junior; 39 Michael Weir – (redshirt) Junior; 42 Jaylin Jackson – (redshirt) Freshman; 42 Umstead Sanders – (redshirt) Junior; 43 Nicolas Sutton – (redshirt) Junior; 44 Garrett Conner – (redshirt) Senior; 46 John Brady – Freshman; 46 Will Thomas – (redshirt) Senior; 47 Justin Pelic – Freshman; 47 Austin Perry – (redshirt) Sophomore; 52 Quaylin Crum – (redshirt) Sophomore; 53 Chase Whitfield – Freshman; 57 Coleman Crozier – (redshirt) Freshman; 80 Trent Whittemore – Freshman; 86 Andres Saldivar – (redshirt) Senior; 87 Dennis Gross – (redshirt) Senior; 94 Moses Gordon III – (redshirt) Senior; 96 Travis Freeman – Freshman

- Redshirt
- Injury

=== Coaching staff ===
Name	Position	Joined staff
Dan Mullen	Head coach	2018
John Hevesy	Co-offensive Coordinator / offensive line	2018
Billy Gonzales	Co-offensive Coordinator / Wide receivers	2018
Todd Grantham	Defensive coordinator	2018
Brian Johnson	Quarterbacks	2018
Greg Knox	Running backs / Special teams coordinator	2018
Larry Scott	Tight ends	2018
David Turner	Defensive line	2019
Christian Robinson	Linebackers	2018
Torrian Gray	Cornerbacks	2019
Ron English	Safeties	2018
Nick Savage	Director of strength and conditioning	2018
Stephen Adegoke	Graduate assistant	2019

== Awards and honors ==
All-SEC
Player	Position	Coaches	Media
Kyle Pitts	TE	1	1
Jonathan Greenard	DE	1	1
C. J. Henderson	CB	1	–
David Reese	LB	–	2

== Players drafted into the NFL ==
Round	Pick	Player	Position	NFL club
1	9	C. J. Henderson	CB	Jacksonville Jaguars
2	57	Van Jefferson	WR	Los Angeles Rams
3	79	Jabari Zuniga	DE	New York Jets
3	90	Jonathan Greenard	OLB	Houston Texans
4	120	La’Mical Perine	RB	New York Jets
6	214	Freddie Swain	WR	Seattle Seahawks
7	252	Tyrie Cleveland	WR	Denver Broncos
