= 2019 Missouri Tigers football team =

University of Missouri in the 2019 NCAA Division I FBS football season

2019 Missouri Tigers football
- Conference: Southeastern Conference
- Eastern Division
- Record: 6–6 (3–5 SEC)
- Head coach: Barry Odom (4th season)
- Offensive coordinator: Derek Dooley (2nd season)
- Offensive scheme: Spread
- Defensive coordinator: Ryan Walters (4th season)
- Base defense: 4–3
- Home stadium: Faurot Field

2019 Southeastern Conference football standings
	Conf.			Overall
Team	W		L	W		L
Eastern Division
No. 4 Georgia x	7	–	1	12	–	2
No. 6 Florida	6	–	2	11	–	2
Tennessee *	5	–	3	8	–	5
Kentucky	3	–	5	8	–	5
Missouri *	3	–	5	6	–	6
South Carolina	3	–	5	4	–	8
Vanderbilt	1	–	7	3	–	9
Western Division
No. 1 LSU x$#^	8	–	0	15	–	0
No. 8 Alabama	6	–	2	11	–	2
No. 14 Auburn	5	–	3	9	–	4
Texas A&M	4	–	4	8	–	5
Mississippi State	3	–	5	6	–	7
Ole Miss	2	–	6	4	–	8
Arkansas	0	–	8	2	–	10
Championship: LSU 37, Georgia 10
# – College Football Playoff champion; ^ – College Football Playoff participant; $ – Conference champion; x – Division champion/co-champions; * – Tennessee vacated all wins due to NCAA violations. Missouri was ineligible for postseason due to NCAA sanctions.; Rankings from AP Poll

The 2019 Missouri Tigers football team represented the University of Missouri in the 2019 NCAA Division I FBS football season. The Tigers played their home games at Faurot Field as members of the Eastern Division of the Southeastern Conference. The Tigers were led by fourth-year head coach Barry Odom in his final season with the team.

On January 31, 2019, the Tigers received a postseason ban from the NCAA for the 2019 season due to academic misconduct and providing extra benefits. The school also was placed on three years' probation and had scholarships reduced. Missouri immediately appealed the decision, but the appeal was denied.

On November 30, 2019, a day after the Tigers' win against Arkansas, fourth-year head coach Barry Odom was fired. He finished at Missouri with a record of 25–25, going 13–19 in SEC play.

== Offseason ==
=== Recruiting ===
College recruiting information (2019)
Name	Hometown	School	Height	Weight	Commit date
Connor Bazelak; QB-PP	Kettering, Ohio	Archbishop Alter High School	6 ft 3 in (1.91 m)	207 lb (94 kg)	Jun 17, 2018
Connor Bazelak; QB-PP	Recruit ratings: Rivals: 247Sports: ESPN: (82)				
Jalani Williams; S	St. Louis, Missouri	Parkway North High School	6 ft 2 in (1.88 m)	170 lb (77 kg)	Nov 16, 2018
Jalani Williams; S	Recruit ratings: Rivals: 247Sports: ESPN: (80)				
Jack Buford; OL	Chicago, Illinois	Luther High School North	6 ft 4 in (1.93 m)	300 lb (140 kg)	Jun 6, 2018
Jack Buford; OL	Recruit ratings: Rivals: 247Sports: ESPN: (80)				
C. J. Boone; WR	St. Louis, Missouri	Parkway North High School	6 ft 2 in (1.88 m)	173 lb (78 kg)	Sep 15, 2018
C. J. Boone; WR	Recruit ratings: Rivals: 247Sports: ESPN: (80)				
Anthony Watkins; RB	Fort Worth, Texas	South Hills High School	5 ft 11 in (1.80 m)	190 lb (86 kg)	Jun 9, 2018
Anthony Watkins; RB	Recruit ratings: Rivals: 247Sports: ESPN: (80)				
Ishmael Burdine; S	Slidell, Louisiana	Slidell High School	6 ft 1 in (1.85 m)	177 lb (80 kg)	Oct 12, 2018
Ishmael Burdine; S	Recruit ratings: Rivals: 247Sports: ESPN: (80)				
Isaiah McGuire; DE	Tulsa, Oklahoma	Union High School	6 ft 4 in (1.93 m)	260 lb (120 kg)	Dec 18, 2018
Isaiah McGuire; DE	Recruit ratings: Rivals: 247Sports: ESPN: (78)				
Martez Manuel; S	Columbia, Missouri	Rock Bridge High School	6 ft 0 in (1.83 m)	185 lb (84 kg)	Jul 29, 2018
Martez Manuel; S	Recruit ratings: Rivals: 247Sports: ESPN: (78)				
Luke Griffin; OL	Chatsworth, Georgia	North Murray High School	6 ft 5 in (1.96 m)	280 lb (130 kg)	Dec 3, 2018
Luke Griffin; OL	Recruit ratings: Rivals: 247Sports: ESPN: (78)				
Maurice Massey; WR	Kirkwood, Missouri	Kirkwood High School	6 ft 4 in (1.93 m)	185 lb (84 kg)	Aug 3, 2018
Maurice Massey; WR	Recruit ratings: Rivals: 247Sports: ESPN: (78)				
Darius Robinson; DE	Canton, Michigan	Canton High School	6 ft 6 in (1.98 m)	249 lb (113 kg)	Dec 19, 2018
Darius Robinson; DE	Recruit ratings: Rivals: 247Sports: ESPN: (77)				
Jamie Pettway; LB	Albany, Georgia	Westover High School	6 ft 3 in (1.91 m)	230 lb (100 kg)	Dec 19, 2018
Jamie Pettway; LB	Recruit ratings: Rivals: 247Sports: ESPN: (77)				
Z'Core Brooks; DE	Dallas, Texas	Woodrow Wilson High School	6 ft 5 in (1.96 m)	218 lb (99 kg)	Feb 6, 2019
Z'Core Brooks; DE	Recruit ratings: Rivals: 247Sports: ESPN: (76)				
Stacy Brown; S	Duncanville, Texas	Duncanville High School	6 ft 2 in (1.88 m)	194 lb (88 kg)	Oct 16, 2018
Stacy Brown; S	Recruit ratings: Rivals: 247Sports: ESPN: (75)				
Aidan Harrison; S	Flushing, Michigan	Flushing High School	6 ft 2 in (1.88 m)	180 lb (82 kg)	Mar 20, 2018
Aidan Harrison; S	Recruit ratings: Rivals: 247Sports: ESPN: (75)				
Devin Nicholson; LB	Detroit, Michigan	Cass Technical High School	6 ft 2 in (1.88 m)	205 lb (93 kg)	Dec 19, 2018
Devin Nicholson; LB	Recruit ratings: Rivals: 247Sports: ESPN: (74)				
Thalen Robinson; OL	Arlington, Texas	Bowie High School	6 ft 5 in (1.96 m)	315 lb (143 kg)	Aug 2, 2018
Thalen Robinson; OL	Recruit ratings: Rivals: 247Sports: ESPN: (74)				
Chris Shearin; CB	Bradenton, Florida	IMG Academy	5 ft 11 in (1.80 m)	177 lb (80 kg)	Jul 16, 2018
Chris Shearin; CB	Recruit ratings: Rivals: 247Sports: ESPN: (74)				
Niko Hea; TE	St. Louis, Missouri	Christian Brothers College High School	6 ft 4 in (1.93 m)	220 lb (100 kg)	Dec 17, 2018
Niko Hea; TE	Recruit ratings: Rivals: 247Sports: ESPN: (73)				
Overall recruit ranking: Rivals: 35 247Sports: 37 ESPN: 33
Note: In many cases, Scout, Rivals, 247Sports, On3, and ESPN may conflict in their listings of height and weight.; In these cases, the average was taken. ESPN grades are on a 100-point scale.; Sources: "Rivals commits". Rivals.; "ESPN commits". ESPN.; "2019 Team Ranking". Rivals.com.; "247Sports commits". 247Sports.

Incoming

Name	No.	Pos.	Height	Weight	Year	Hometown	Prev. school
Kelly Bryant	#7	QB	6'3"	225	2019	Calhoun Falls, South Carolina	Clemson
Chris Daniels	#13	DT	6'4"	314	2019	Euless, Texas	Texas
Jonathan Nance	#4	WR	6'0"	190	2019	Perkinston, Mississippi	Arkansas
Shawn Robinson	#3	QB	6'2"	225	2019	DeSoto, Texas	TCU

== NCAA investigation ==
On January 31, 2019, the NCAA gave the Tigers a postseason ban for the 2019 season. The Tigers' baseball and softball teams were also declared ineligible for postseason play. The NCAA found that a former University of Missouri tutor violated NCAA bylaws by completing coursework for 12 student athletes in football, baseball, and softball. The tutor or any of the athletes involved in the investigation were not named in the NCAA's report. The tutor received a 10-year show-cause for her involvement in the penalties. The NCAA issued the following penalties:

- three years of probation.
- a 10-year show-cause order for the former tutor. During that period, any NCAA member school employing the tutor must restrict her from any athletically related duties.
- a 2018–19 postseason ban for the baseball and softball programs.
- a 2019–20 postseason ban for the football program.
- a vacation of records in which football, baseball and, softball student-athletes competed while ineligible. The university must provide a written report containing the matches impacted to the NCAA media coordination and statistics staff within 45 days of the public decision release.
- a five percent reduction in the amount of scholarships in each of the football, baseball, and softball programs during the 2019–20 academic year.
- Recruiting restrictions for each of the football, baseball, and softball programs during the 2019–20 academic year, including: a seven-week ban on unofficial visits, a 12.5 percent reduction in official visits, a seven-week ban on recruiting communications, a seven-week ban on all off-campus recruiting contacts and evaluations, a 12.5 percent reduction in recruiting-person or evaluation days.
- a disassociation of the tutor.
- a fine of $5,000 plus one percent of each of the football, baseball, and softball budgets.

The penalties were upheld after an appeal by Missouri.

== Preseason ==
=== SEC media poll ===
The 2019 SEC Media Days were held July 15–18 in Birmingham, Alabama. In the preseason media poll, Missouri was projected to finish in third in the East Division.

=== Preseason All-SEC teams ===
The Tigers had five players selected to the preseason all-SEC teams.

Offense

1st team

Albert Okwuegbunam – TE

2nd team

Tre'Vour Wallace-Simms – OL

3rd team

Larry Rountree III – RB

Defense

2nd team

Cale Garrett – LB

3rd team

DeMarkus Acy – DB

=== Spring game ===
The 2019 Tigers football spring game took place in Columbia, Missouri on April 13, 2019, at 3 p.m. CST with the Mizzou Black beating the Mizzou Gold 21–3. The leading rusher for the game was Larry Rountree III with 53 rushing yards and 1 touchdown. Kelly Bryant was the leading passer, completing 12 of 17 passes for 150 yards.

== Schedule ==
Date	Time	Opponent	Rank	Site	TV	Result	Attendance
August 31	6:30 p.m.	at Wyoming*		War Memorial Stadium; Laramie, WY	CBSSN	L 31–37	30,037
September 7	11:00 a.m.	West Virginia*		Faurot Field; Columbia, MO (SEC Nation)	ESPN2	W 38–7	51,215
September 14	6:30 p.m.	No. 19 (FCS) Southeast Missouri State*		Faurot Field; Columbia, MO	SECN Alt.	W 50–0	56,620
September 21	3:00 p.m.	South Carolina		Faurot Field; Columbia, MO	SECN Alt.	W 34–14	52,012
October 5	3:00 p.m.	Troy*		Faurot Field; Columbia, MO	SECN	W 42–10	50,023
October 12	6:00 p.m.	Ole Miss^{†}		Faurot Field; Columbia, MO	ESPN2	W 38–27	62,621
October 19	3:00 p.m.	at Vanderbilt	No. 22	Vanderbilt Stadium; Nashville, TN	SECN	L 14–21	23,900
October 26	6:30 p.m.	at Kentucky		Kroger Field; Lexington, KY	SECN	L 7–29	48,446
November 9	6:30 p.m.	at No. 6 Georgia		Sanford Stadium; Athens, GA	ESPN	L 0–27	92,746
November 16	11:00 a.m.	No. 11 Florida		Faurot Field; Columbia, MO	CBS	L 6–23	57,280
November 23	6:30 p.m.	Tennessee		Faurot Field; Columbia, MO	SECN	L 20–24	49,348
November 29	1:30 p.m.	at Arkansas		War Memorial Stadium; Little Rock, AR (Battle Line Rivalry)	CBS	W 24–14	33,961
*Non-conference game; ^{†}Homecoming; Rankings from AP Poll and CFP Rankings after November 5 released prior to game; All times are in Central time

Schedule source:

== Roster ==
2019 Missouri Tigers football team roster
Players
Coaches
Offense

Pos.	#	Name	Class
RB	1	Tyler Badie	So
QB/WR	2	Micah Wilson	Jr
QB	3	Shawn Robinson	Jr
WR	4	Jonathan Nance	Sr
QB	5	Taylor Powell	So
WR	6	Khmari Thompson	Fr
QB	7	Kelly Bryant	Sr
WR	8	Justin Smith	Sr
WR	9	Jalen Knox	So
WR	10	C.J. Boone	Fr
WR	11	Barrett Banister	So
WR	12	Johnathon Johnson	Sr
WR	13	Kam Scott	So
WR	14	Dominic Gicinto	So
WR	17	Richaud Floyd	Sr
QB	18	Lindsey Scott	Jr
RB	20	Simi Bakare	So
WR	21	Alex Ofodile	Sr
RB	28	Dawson Downing	Jr
WR	30	Carson McCarty	So
RB	34	Larry Rountree III	Jr
WR	36	Daniel Ellinger	Jr
RB	43	Jerney Jones	Jr
OL	50	Hyrin White	So
OL	52	Steven Hardy	Fr
OL	55	Trystan Colon-Castillo	Jr
OL	59	Case Cook	So
OL	61	Richard Taylor	Fr
OL	62	Thomas Grossman	Sr
OL	64	Bobby Lawrence	Fr
OL	66	Keion Willis	So
OL	67	Jonah Dubinski	Sr
OL	70	Yasir Durant	Sr
OL	72	Xavier Delgado	Fr
OL	73	Mike Ruth	Fr
OL	74	Angel Matute	Jr
OL	75	Tre'Vour Wallace-Simms	Sr
OL	76	Javon Foster	Fr
OL	79	Larry Borom	So
TE	80	Messiah Swinson	Fr
TE	81	Albert Okwuegbunam	Jr
TE	82	Daniel Parker	So
TE	85	Zac Schachtner	Fr
WR	86	Tauskie Dove	Fr
WR	87	Cade Musser	Fr
TE	88	Logan Christopherson	So
TE	89	Brendan Scales	Jr

Defense

Pos.	#	Name	Class
DL	1	Jordan Elliott	Jr
DB	2	DeMarkus Acy	Sr
S	3	Ronnell Perkins	Jr
S	4	Jalani Williams	Fr
DB	5	Chris Shearin	Fr
DL	6	Darius Robinson	Fr
DB	8	Jarvis Ware	So
S	9	Tyree Gillespie	Jr
DB	10	Terry Petry	So
S	11	Jordan Ulmer	Jr
DB	12	Chris Mills	Fr
DL	13	Chris Daniels	Jr
DB	14	Adam Sparks	Jr
DL	15	Trajan Jeffcoat	So
LB	16	Gerald Nathan Jr.	Fr
S	18	Joshuah Bledsoe	Jr
DB	20	Khall Oliver	Sr
DB	21	Christian Holmes	Jr
LB	22	Aubrey Miller Jr.	Jr
DB	24	Ishmael Burdine	Fr
LB	25	Jamal Brooks	Jr
DL	28	Jatorian Hansford	So
DL	29	Nate Anderson	Sr
DB	30	Zion Sales	So
LB	32	Nick Bolton	So
LB	33	Chad Bailey	Fr
DB	35	Mason Pack	Jr
LB	36	Joe Britton	So
LB	38	Byson Clayton	Fr
DL	39	Chris Turner	Jr
LB	40	Cameron Wilkins	So
LB	41	Chance May	So
DL	45	Franklin Agbasimere	Sr
LB	46	Jacob Trump	Sr
LB	47	Cale Garrett	Sr
DL	52	Myles Eaddy	Jr
LB	53	Joe Hoy	Sr
DL	56	Antar Thompson	Jr
LB	57	Jairan Parker	So
DL	66	Keion Willis	So
DL	78	Kobie Whiteside	Jr
DL	88	Chris Williams	Jr
DL	90	Markell Utsey	Jr
DL	93	Tre Williams	Jr
DL	94	Tyrell Jacobs	Sr
DL	96	Cannon York	Fr
DL	97	Akial Byers	Jr

Special teams

Pos.	#	Name	Class
K	19	Tucker McCann	Sr
LS	49	Jake Hoffman	Fr
LS	51	Drew Wise	Jr
LS	86	James Workman	Sr
K	90	Sean Koetting	So
P	91	Josh Dodge	Fr
K	92	Matthew Jaeger	Fr

Head coach

- Barry Odom

Coordinators/assistant coaches

- Brick Haley (Senior Associate head coach / Defensive Line)
- Andy Hill (Associate head coach / special teams coordinator)
- Cornell Ford (assistant head coach / running backs)
- Derek Dooley (offensive coordinator / quarterbacks)
- Ryan Walters (defensive coordinator / secondary/ outside linebackers)
- Vernon Hargreaves (Inside linebackers)
- Brad Davis (offensive line)
- AJ Ofodile (tight ends)
- Garrick McGee (wide receivers)
- David Gibbs (cornerbacks)
- Michael Scherer (graduate assistant)
- Austyn Carta-Samuels (director of character & culture development)

Legend

- (C) Team captain
- (S) Suspended
- (I) Ineligible
- Injured
- Redshirt

Roster
Last update: April 19, 2019

== Game summaries ==
=== At Wyoming ===
	1	2	3	4	Total
Tigers	14	3	0	14	31
Cowboys	0	27	7	3	37

Scoring summary

Quarter	Time	Drive			Team	Scoring information	Score	
Quarter	Time	Plays	Yards	TOP	Team	Scoring information	MIZ	WYO
1	9:04	12	65	4:31	MIZ	Jonathan Nance 3-yard touchdown reception from Kelly Bryant, Tucker McCann kick good	7	0
1	3:19	11	74	4:27	MIZ	Larry Rountree III 2-yard touchdown run, Tucker McCann kick good	14	0
2	9:09	12	53	5:37	WYO	19-yard field goal by Cooper Rothe	14	3
2	7:54	3	5	1:15	WYO	Fumble recovery returned 30 yards for touchdown by C.J. Coldon, Cooper Rothe kick good	14	10
2	6:15	2	61	0:14	WYO	Xazavian Valladay 61-yard touchdown run, Cooper Rothe kick good	14	17
2	2:11	13	70	4:04	MIZ	22-yard field goal by Tucker McCann	17	17
2	1:58	1	75	0:13	WYO	Sean Chambers 75-yard touchdown run, Cooper Rothe kick good	17	24
2	0:00	1	0	0:00	WYO	23-yard field goal by Cooper Rothe	17	27
3	4:21	11	80	5:43	WYO	Trey Smith 1-yard touchdown run, Cooper Rothe kick good	17	34
4	13:29	4	29	1:10	MIZ	Tyler Badie 1-yard touchdown run, Tucker McCann kick good	24	34
4	7:01	9	38	3:24	WYO	20-yard field goal by Cooper Rothe	24	37
4	6:19	3	75	0:42	MIZ	Jonathan Nance 53-yard touchdown reception from Kelly Bryant, Tucker McCann kick good	31	37
"TOP" = time of possession. For other American football terms, see Glossary of American football.							31	37

- Passing leaders: Sean Chambers (WYO): 6–16, 92 YDS; Kelly Bryant (MIZ): 31–48, 423 YDS, 2 TD, 1 INT
- Rushing leaders: Sean Chambers (WYO): 12 CAR, 120 YDS, 1 TD; Tyler Badie (MIZ): 16 CAR, 53 YDS, 1 TD
- Receiving leaders: Raghib Ismail Jr. (WYO): 2 REC, 42 YDS; Albert Okwuegbunam (MIZ): 3 REC, 72 YDS

=== West Virginia ===
	1	2	3	4	Total
Mountaineers	0	0	0	7	7
Tigers	10	21	0	7	38

=== Southeast Missouri State ===
	1	2	3	4	Total
No. 19 Redhawks	0	0	0	0	0
Tigers	27	10	10	3	50

=== South Carolina ===
	1	2	3	4	Total
Gamecocks	0	7	7	0	14
Tigers	7	10	14	3	34

=== Troy ===
	1	2	3	4	Total
Trojans	7	0	3	0	10
Tigers	21	21	0	0	42

=== Ole Miss ===
	1	2	3	4	Total
Rebels	7	0	7	13	27
Tigers	3	9	23	3	38

=== At Vanderbilt ===
	1	2	3	4	Total
No. 22 Tigers	0	7	7	0	14
Commodores	0	14	0	7	21

=== At Kentucky ===
	1	2	3	4	Total
Tigers	0	0	7	0	7
Wildcats	0	22	0	7	29

=== At Georgia ===
	1	2	3	4	Total
Tigers	0	0	0	0	0
No. 6 Bulldogs	7	9	3	8	27

=== Florida ===
	1	2	3	4	Total
No. 11 Florida	3	3	14	3	23
Missouri	0	3	3	0	6

Scoring summary

Quarter	Time	Drive			Team	Scoring information	Score	
Quarter	Time	Plays	Yards	TOP	Team	Scoring information	Florida	Missouri
1	12:11	7	45	2:49	Florida	47-yard field goal by Evan McPherson	3	0
2	9:36	6	71	2:33	Missouri	37-yard field goal by Tucker McCann	3	3
2	7:34	6	53	2:02	Florida	39-yard field goal by Evan McPherson	6	3
3	11:56	3	60	1:06	Florida	Josh Hammond 34-yard touchdown reception from Kyle Trask, Evan McPherson kick good	13	3
3	6:49	7	36	2:22	Missouri	28-yard field goal by Tucker McCann	13	6
3	2:58	8	75	3:51	Florida	La'Mical Perine 15-yard touchdown reception from Kyle Trask, Evan McPherson kick good	20	6
4	10:37	8	61	3:03	Florida	22-yard field goal by Evan McPherson	23	6
"TOP" = time of possession. For other American football terms, see Glossary of American football.							23	6

=== Tennessee ===
Tennessee at Missouri

Team	1	2	3	4	Total
• Tennessee	0	17	7	0	24
Missouri	3	7	7	3	20

- Date: November 23
- Location: Columbia, Missouri
- Game start: 7:39 pm EDT
- Elapsed time: 3:25
- Game attendance: 49,348
- Game weather: Temperature: 39 °F (4 °C) • Wind: 8 mph (13 km/h)
- Referee: Steve Marlowe
- TV announcers (SECN): Dave Neal (play-by-play), D. J. Shockley (color) and Dawn Davenport (sidelines)

=== At Arkansas ===
Game Twelve – Missouri Tigers (5–6) at Arkansas Razorbacks (2–9)

Quarter	1	2	3	4	Total
Tigers	0	10	7	7	24
Razorbacks	7	0	7	0	14

at War Memorial Stadium • Little Rock, Arkansas

- Date: Friday, November 29, 2019
- Game time: 1:30 p.m. CDT
- Game weather: Cloudy • Temperature: 49 °F (9 °C) • Wind: E 6 mph
- Game attendance: 33,961
- Referee: John McDaid
- TV announcers (CBS): Carter Blackburn (play-by-play), Aaron Taylor and Rick Neuheisel (color), John Schriffen (sideline)

Game information

First Quarter

- (6:49) ARK – Trey Knox 19 yard pass from Jack Lindsey, Connor Limpert kick (Drive: 5 plays, 38 yards, 1:48; Arkansas 7–0)

Second Quarter

- (14:56) MIZ – Larry Rountree 5 yard rush, Tucker McCann kick (Drive: 14 plays, 75 yards, 6:53; Tied 7–7)
- (5:08) MIZ – Tucker McCann 26 yard field goal (Drive: 8 plays, 48 yards, 3:05; Missouri 10–7)

Third Quarter

- (13:34) ARK – Grayson Gunter 10 yard pass from Jack Lindsey, Connor Limpert kick (Drive: 3 plays, 26 yards, 1:21; Arkansas 14–10)
- (7:00) MIZ – Tyler Badie 3 yard rush, Tucker McCann kick (Drive: 8 plays, 84 yards, 2:54; Missouri 17–14)

Fourth Quarter

- (8:47) MIZ – Jonathan Nance 10 yard pass from Taylor Powell, Tucker McCann kick (Drive: 8 plays, 64 yards, 2:38; Missouri 24–14)

Statistics	MIZ	ARK
First downs	20	16
Total yards	329	242
Rushes–yards	47–144	31–165
Passing yards	185	77
Passing: Comp–Att–Int	15–23–1	11–31–0
Time of possession	31:30	29:30

Team	Category	Player	Statistics
Missouri	Passing	Taylor Powell	8/14, 105 yards, 1 TD, 1 INT
Missouri	Rushing	Larry Rountree III	24 carries, 88 yards
Missouri	Receiving	Barre Banister	6 receptions, 60 yards
Arkansas	Passing	Jack Lindsey	10/26, 75 yards, 2 TD
Arkansas	Rushing	Rakeem Boyd	21 carries, 95 yards
Arkansas	Receiving	Michael Woods II	2 receptions, 26 yards

== Rankings ==
Ranking movements Legend: ██ Increase in ranking ██ Decrease in ranking — = Not ranked RV = Received votes
	Week																
Poll	Pre	1	2	3	4	5	6	7	8	9	10	11	12	13	14	15	Final
AP	RV	—	—	—	RV	RV	RV	22	RV	—	—	—	—	—	—		
Coaches	—	—	—	—	—	—	—	—	—	—	—	—	—	—	—		
CFP	Not released										—	—	—	—	—		Not released

== Players drafted into the NFL ==
Round	Pick	Player	Position	NFL Club
3	88	Jordan Elliott	DT	Cleveland Browns
4	118	Albert Okwuegbunam	TE	Denver Broncos
