= 2020 in American football =

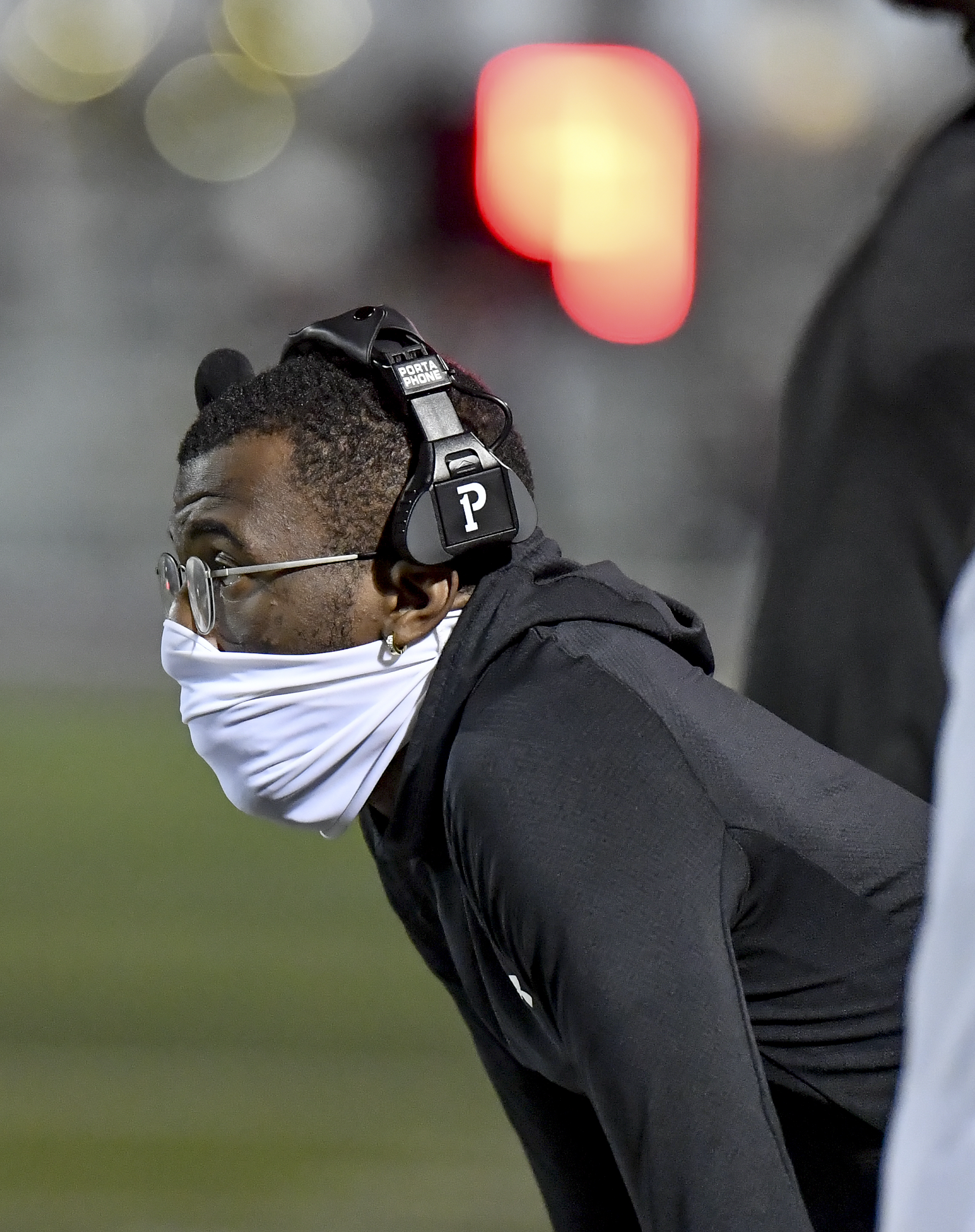
High school football coach in Ohio wearing a facemask.

This article is about the 2019–20 American football season.

== 2019–20 College Football Playoff and Championship Game ==
- December 28, 2019: 2019 Cotton Bowl Classic in Arlington at AT&T Stadium
  - The Penn State Nittany Lions defeated the Memphis Tigers 53–39.
- December 28, 2019: 2019 Fiesta Bowl in Glendale at State Farm Stadium
  - The Clemson Tigers defeated the Ohio State Buckeyes 29–23.
- December 28, 2019: 2019 Peach Bowl in Atlanta at Mercedes-Benz Stadium
  - The LSU Tigers defeated the Oklahoma Sooners 63–28.
- December 30, 2019: 2019 Orange Bowl in Miami Gardens at Hard Rock Stadium
  - The Florida Gators defeated the Virginia Cavaliers 36–28.
- January 1: 2020 Rose Bowl in Pasadena at Rose Bowl
  - The Oregon Ducks defeated the Wisconsin Badgers 28–27.
- January 1: 2020 Sugar Bowl in New Orleans at Mercedes-Benz Superdome
  - The Georgia Bulldogs defeated the Baylor Bears 26–14.
- January 13: 2020 College Football Playoff National Championship in New Orleans at Mercedes-Benz Superdome
  - The LSU Tigers defeated the Clemson Tigers 42–25.

== National Football League ==
- January 26: 2020 Pro Bowl in Orlando
- February 2: Super Bowl LIV in Miami Gardens

Kansas City Chiefs defeated the San Francisco 49ers 31 - 20

- April 23 – 25: 2020 NFL draft in Paradise
- September 10, 2020 – January 3, 2021: 2020 NFL season

== XFL ==
- February 8 – March 11: 2020 XFL season, terminated due to coronavirus pandemic and social distancing mandates
