= Vanchi Jefferson =

Vanchi Jefferson may refer to:

- Shawn Jefferson, American football coach for the Carolina Panthers and former player
- Van Jefferson, American football player for the Los Angeles Rams
