= Jabari Zuniga =

American football player (born 1997)

No. 68, 91, 92
- Position: Defensive end

Personal information
- Born: August 14, 1997 (age 29); Marietta, Georgia, U.S.
- Listed height: 6 ft 3 in (1.91 m)
- Listed weight: 264 lb (120 kg)

Career information
- High school: Sprayberry (Marietta)
- College: Florida (2015–2019)
- NFL draft: 2020: 3rd round, 79th overall pick

Career history
- New York Jets (2020–2021); Seattle Seahawks (2022)*; New Orleans Saints (2022–2023)*
- * Offseason or practice squad member only

Career NFL statistics
- Total tackles: 8
- Sacks: 1
- Forced fumbles: 1
- Stats at Pro Football Reference

Jabari Zuniga (born August 14, 1997) is an American former professional football player who was a defensive end in the National Football League (NFL). He played college football for the Florida Gators and was selected by the New York Jets in the third round of the 2020 NFL draft.

== Early life ==
Zuniga grew up in Marietta, Georgia, the son of Tammy Thompson and Carlos Zuniga and attended Sprayberry High School. He originally only played basketball at Sprayberry and did not start playing football until his junior year. Rated a four-star prospect by 247Sports.com, Zuniga initially committed to play college football at NC State. He de-committed and eventually chose to attend the University of Florida over Arkansas.

== College career ==
Zuniga redshirted his true freshman season. He played in all 13 of the Gators' games with three starts as a redshirt freshman, recording 25 tackles, 8.5 tackles-for-loss and a team-best 5.0 sacks with 11 quarterback hurries and a forced fumble. As a redshirt sophomore, Zuniga made 34 tackles, 8.0 tackles-for-loss, four sacks in ten games played (six starts). He started all 13 of Florida's games the following season and finished the year 45 tackles and finished second on the team with 11.0 tackles for loss along 6.5 sacks. Zuniga was named the Southeastern Conference Defensive Lineman of the Week for Week 3 after recording 2.5 sacks against Colorado State. He initially contemplated forgoing his final year of NCAA eligibility to enter the 2019 NFL draft, but ultimately decided to return to Florida for his redshirt senior season.

Zuniga entered his redshirt senior season as a preseason first-team All-Southeastern Conference selection. He was named to the watchlist for the Chuck Bednarik Award midway through the season. Zuniga suffered a high ankle sprain against Kentucky, causing him to miss the next two games, and then re-injured his ankle against Georgia and missed the final four games of the regular season. He returned to play in the 2019 Orange Bowl against Virginia and finished the season with 14 tackles, 7 tackles for a loss, and 3 sacks.

== Professional career ==
Pre-draft measurables
Height	Weight	Arm length	Hand span	40-yard dash	10-yard split	20-yard split	Vertical jump	Broad jump	Bench press
6 ft 3 3/8 in (1.91 m)	264 lb (120 kg)	32 7/8 in (0.84 m)	10 3/8 in (0.26 m)	4.64 s	1.61 s	2.71 s	33.0 in (0.84 m)	10 ft 7 in (3.23 m)	29 reps
All values from NFL Combine

=== New York Jets ===
Zuniga was selected by the New York Jets in the third round, 79th overall, of the 2020 NFL draft. He was placed on injured reserve on September 7, 2020. He was designated to return from injured reserve on October 7, and began practicing with the team again. He was activated on October 28.

On September 1, 2021, Zuniga was waived by the Jets and re-signed to the practice squad the next day. He was promoted to the active roster on January 5, 2022.

On August 30, 2022, Zuniga was waived by the Jets.

=== Seattle Seahawks ===
On September 5, 2022, the Seattle Seahawks added Zuniga to their practice squad. He was released on October 12.

=== New Orleans Saints ===
On October 18, 2022, Zuniga was signed to the New Orleans Saints practice squad. He signed a reserve/future contract on January 9, 2023.

Zuniga announced his retirement from professional football on July 30, 2023.
