= C. J. Henderson (American football) =

American football player (born 1998)

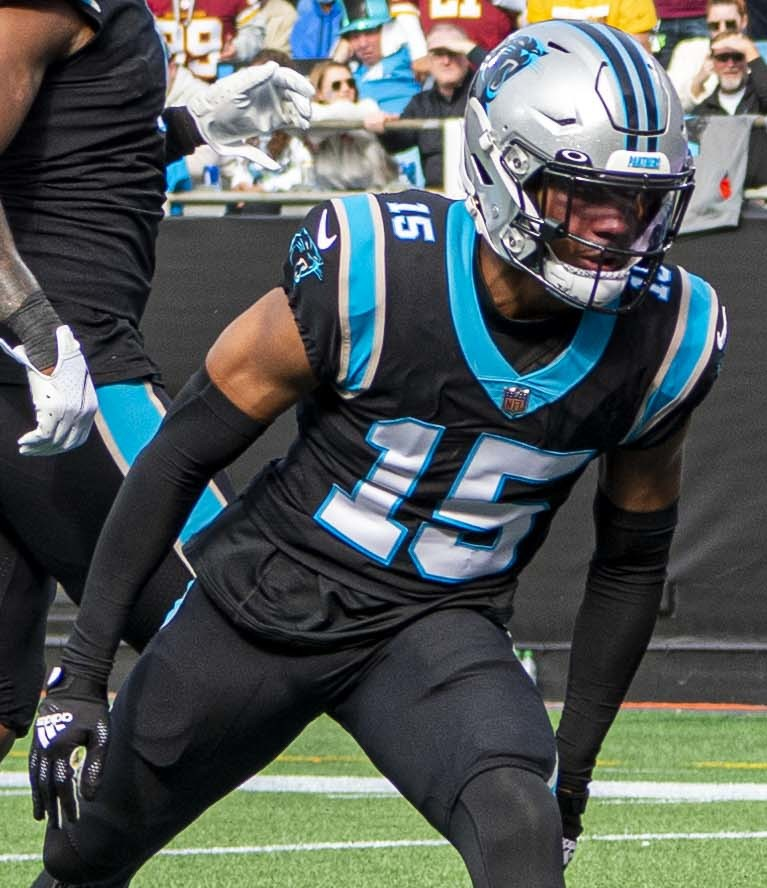
- Henderson with the Carolina Panthers in 2021

No. 26 – Atlanta Falcons
- Position: Cornerback
- Roster status: Active

Personal information
- Born: September 30, 1998 (age 28); Miami, Florida, U.S.
- Listed height: 6 ft 1 in (1.85 m)
- Listed weight: 205 lb (93 kg)

Career information
- High school: Christopher Columbus (Miami)
- College: Florida (2017–2019)
- NFL draft: 2020: 1st round, 9th overall pick

Career history
- Jacksonville Jaguars (2020–2021); Carolina Panthers (2021–2023); Houston Texans (2024)*; Pittsburgh Steelers (2024); Atlanta Falcons (2025–present)
- * Offseason or practice squad member only

Awards and highlights
- First-team All-SEC (2019); 2× Second-team All-SEC (2017, 2018)

Career NFL statistics as of Week 10, 2026
- Tackles: 228
- Sacks: 1.0
- Forced fumbles: 3
- Fumble recoveries: 2
- Pass deflections: 28
- Interceptions: 4
- Stats at Pro Football Reference

Christopher "C. J." Henderson, Jr. (born September 30, 1998) is an American professional football cornerback for the Atlanta Falcons of the National Football League (NFL). He played college football for the Florida Gators and was drafted by the Jacksonville Jaguars ninth overall in the 2020 NFL draft.

== Early life ==
Henderson was born and raised in Miami, Florida, and attended Christopher Columbus High School. He played both running back and cornerback for the Explorers' football team and was invited to play in the All-America Bowl as a senior. He was ranked a four-star prospect and initially committed to play at the University of Miami before de-committing to evaluate other offers. Henderson ultimately signed a letter of intent to play at the University of Florida.

== College career ==
As a true freshman, Henderson appeared in 11 games for the Gators with five starts and made 22 tackles with four interceptions. He became the first freshman in Florida's history to return an interception for a touchdown in back-to-back games after doing so in his first two career games against Michigan and Tennessee. In his sophomore year, his first full season as a starter, Henderson recorded 38 tackles, two sacks and two forced fumbles with two interceptions and a team-high seven passes defended and was named second-team All-Southeastern Conference (SEC) by the league's coaches.

Henderson entered his junior season as a preseason first-team All-SEC selection, third-team preseason All-America, and on the Bednarik Award watchlist. Henderson was also named a second-team midseason All-American by the Associated Press despite missing four games due to injury. Henderson finished his junior season with 33 tackles (three for loss), a sack and 11 passes broken up in nine games and was named first-team All-SEC by the league's coaches and a second-team All-American by the Football Writers Association of America. Following the end of the Gators' regular season, Henderson announced that he would forgo his final year of eligibility to enter the 2020 NFL draft and also skip Florida's bowl game. Henderson finished his collegiate career with 93 tackles, 26 passes broken up and six interceptions in 33 games played.

== Professional career ==
Pre-draft measurables
Height	Weight	Arm length	Hand span	Wingspan	40-yard dash	10-yard split	20-yard split	Vertical jump	Broad jump	Bench press
6 ft 0 3/4 in (1.85 m)	204 lb (93 kg)	31 5/8 in (0.80 m)	9 in (0.23 m)	6 ft 3 7/8 in (1.93 m)	4.39 s	1.51 s	2.58 s	37.5 in (0.95 m)	10 ft 7 in (3.23 m)	20 reps
All values from NFL Combine

=== Jacksonville Jaguars ===
Henderson was selected by the Jacksonville Jaguars in the first round with the ninth overall pick in the 2020 NFL draft. On July 16, 2020, Henderson signed his four-year rookie contract, worth a fully guaranteed $20.5 million. Henderson made his NFL debut in the season opener on September 13, 2020, against the Indianapolis Colts, starting and recording five tackles and his first career interception, picking off a pass from Philip Rivers and returning it for 22 yards, and defending three passes, including breaking up a pass on a fourth down late in the fourth quarter to secure a Jaguars' 27–20 win, and was named the Pepsi NFL Rookie of the Week. In Week 10 against the Green Bay Packers, Henderson forced a fumble on wide receiver Davante Adams which was recovered by teammate Myles Jack during the 24–20 loss. He was placed on injured reserve on November 19, 2020, with a groin injury.

In October 2020 during a ribbon cutting ceremony, the training center at Christopher Columbus High School, his alma mater, was dedicated in the Henderson Family name due to his generous contribution to the redesign of the facility.

=== Carolina Panthers ===
On September 27, 2021, Henderson was traded to the Carolina Panthers with a 2022 fifth-round pick in exchange for tight end Dan Arnold and a 2022 third-round pick. In the 2021 season, he appeared in 12 games and started seven.

In the 2022 season, Henderson started in ten games and appeared in all 17. He finished with 58 total tackles, two interceptions, six passes defended, and one forced fumble.

=== Houston Texans ===
On March 21, 2024, Henderson signed with the Houston Texans. He was released on August 27.

=== Pittsburgh Steelers ===
On September 25, 2024, Henderson was signed to the Pittsburgh Steelers' practice squad. Later on October 21, he was signed to the active roster.

=== Atlanta Falcons ===
On August 14, 2025, Henderson signed with the Atlanta Falcons. He was released by the Falcons during final roster cuts on August 26 and re-signed to the practice squad the next day. Henderson was released by Atlanta on September 22. On November 13, he was re-signed to the practice squad. He was promoted to the active roster on December 20.

On November 13, 2026, Henderson signed a two-year, $20 million contract extension with the Falcons to keep him with the team through the 2028 season.

== Career statistics ==
Legend
**Bold**	Career high

=== NFL ===
Year	Team	Games		Tackles				Interceptions						Fumbles			
Year	Team	GP	GS	Cmb	Solo	Ast	Sck	PD	Int	Yds	Avg	Lng	TD	FF	FR	Yds	TD
2020	JAX	8	8	36	27	**9**	0.0	6	1	22	22.0	22	0	**1**	0	0	0
2021	JAX	2	2	8	6	2	0.0	0	0	0	0.0	0	0	0	0	0	0
2021	CAR	10	5	31	25	6	0.0	2	0	0	0.0	0	0	0	0	0	0
2022	CAR	17	10	**58**	**50**	8	0.0	6	**2**	**74**	**37.0**	**54**	0	**1**	**1**	0	0
2023	CAR	12	7	39	31	8	**1.0**	2	0	0	0.0	0	0	0	0	0	0
2025	ATL	4	2	13	8	5	0.0	3	1	0	0.0	0	0	0	0	0	0
2026	ATL	9	7	43	34	9	0.0	**9**	0	0	0.0	0	0	**1**	**1**	0	0
Career		62	41	228	181	47	1.0	28	4	96	24.0	54	0	3	2	0	0

=== College ===
Year	Team	Class	GP	Tackles					Interceptions					Fumbles	
Year	Team	Class	GP	Solo	Ast	Tot	Loss	Sk	Int	Yds	Avg	TD	PD	FF	FR
2017	Florida	FR	9	14	8	22	0.0	0.0	**4**	**82**	**20.5**	**2**	4	0	0
2018	Florida	SO	12	**26**	**12**	**38**	**5.0**	**3.0**	2	0	0.0	0	5	**2**	0
2019	Florida	JR	9	**26**	7	33	3.0	1.0	0	0	0.0	0	**11**	0	0
Career			30	66	27	93	8.0	4.0	6	82	13.7	2	20	0	2
