= Tre'Vour Wallace-Simms =

American football player (born 1997)

Purdue Boilermakers
- Title: Offensive analyst

Personal information
- Born: September 25, 1997 (age 29); East St. Louis, Illinois, U.S.
- Listed height: 6 ft 5 in (1.96 m)
- Listed weight: 330 lb (150 kg)

Career information
- Position: Guard (No. 75)
- High school: East St. Louis Senior
- College: Missouri
- NFL draft: 2020: undrafted

Career history

Playing
- Jacksonville Jaguars (2020–2021); Houston Texans (2022)*; Birmingham Stallions (2023)
- * Offseason or practice squad member only

Coaching
- Purdue (2026–present) Offensive analyst

Awards and highlights
- USFL champion (2023)

Career NFL statistics
- Games played: 18
- Stats at Pro Football Reference

Tre'Vour Wallace-Simms (born September 25, 1997) is an American college football coach and former professional football guard. His is an offensive analyst at Purdue University. Wallace-Simms played college football for the Missouri Tigers. He played professionally in the National Football League (NFL) for three seasons and in the United States Football League in 2023.

== Professional career ==
=== Jacksonville Jaguars ===
Wallace-Simms signed with the Jacksonville Jaguars as an undrafted free agent following the 2020 NFL draft on April 27, 2020. He was placed on the reserve/COVID-19 list by the team on July 27, 2020, and activated on August 20. He was waived during final roster cuts on September 5, 2020, and signed to the team's practice squad two days later. He was elevated to the active roster on December 12, December 19, December 26, 2020, and January 2, 2021, for the team's weeks 14, 15, 16, and 17 games against the Tennessee Titans, Baltimore Ravens, Chicago Bears, and Indianapolis Colts, and reverted to the practice squad after each game. He signed a reserve/futures contract with the team on January 4, 2021.

On August 31, 2021, Wallace-Simms was waived by the Jaguars and re-signed to the practice squad the next day.

=== Houston Texans ===
On June 6, 2022, Wallace-Simms signed with the Houston Texans. He was waived on August 30, 2022. He was re-signed to the practice squad on September 21.

=== Birmingham Stallions ===
Wallace-Simms signed with the Birmingham Stallions of the USFL on April 25, 2023. He was released on February 8, 2024.
