= Keon Zipperer =

American football player (born 2001)

No. 9
- Position: Tight end

Personal information
- Born: July 27, 2001 (age 25)
- Listed height: 6 ft 1 in (1.85 m)
- Listed weight: 242 lb (110 kg)

Career information
- High school: Lakeland (Lakeland, Florida)
- College: Florida (2019–2024)
- Stats at ESPN

Keon Malik Zipperer (born July 27, 2001) is an American former college football tight end. He played for the Florida Gators.

== Early life ==
Zipperer grew up in Lakeland, Florida. He attended and played high school football at Lakeland Senior High School. During his senior year, he helped his team win the FHSAA Class 7A State Championship. He played in the 2019 Under Armour All-America Game. He was a four-star rated recruit and committed to play college football at the University of Florida over offers from Alabama, Clemson, Florida State, Georgia, LSU, Miami (FL) and Tennessee.

== College career ==
During Zipperer's true freshman season in 2019, he appeared in eight games, finishing the season with 31 receiving yards on three receptions and one touchdown with a 25-yard catch against Towson. During the 2020 season, he appeared in 10 games as a tight end and on special teams. He finished the season with seven receptions for 107 yards and two touchdowns. During the 2021 season, he played in all 13 games, finishing the season with 11 receptions for 133 yards. During the 2022 season, he appeared in eight games and started six of them at tight end. He finished the season with 13 receptions for 177 yards and a touchdown.

Zipperer did not make an appearance during the 2023 season after an injury he sustained during spring camp.

On December 15, 2024, Zipperer announced that he would medically retire from football after suffering through a serious injury and multiple injuries which has kept him off the field for his last two seasons.
