= Lakeland Senior High School (Florida) =

Location
- 726 Hollingsworth Road; Lakeland, Florida 33801; United States; 28°2′6″N 81°56′26″W

Information
- Type: Public
- Motto: Nulli Secundus (Second to None)
- Established: 1927; 99 years ago
- Principal: Alain Douge
- Staff: 104.00 (on an FTE basis)
- Grades: 9-12
- Enrollment: 2,057 (2023-2024)
- Student to teacher ratio: 19.78
- Colors: Orange and black
- Mascot: Andy the anchor
- Website: School website

Lakeland Senior High School, opened in 1902, is the oldest public high school in Lakeland, Florida, United States. The school was originally located on North Florida Avenue and was destroyed by fire in 1927. It is part of Polk County Public Schools. Lakeland Senior High School was the original high school in the city. It also shares its campus with Lois Cowles Harrison Center for the Visual and Performing Arts. Harrison students attend academic classes at Lakeland Senior High School.

== Athletics ==
The school's athletic teams are known as the Lakeland Dreadnaughts. Lakeland's football team has won nine state championships, in 1986, 1996, 1999, 2004, 2005, 2006, 2018, 2022, 2023 Their cheer team has won 6 state championships 2019, 2020, 2021, 2022, 2023, 2024 and now two national championships in 2023, and 2024. The Dreadnaughts have played their home football games at Thomas W. Bryant Stadium since 1941. They won their inaugural game at the stadium on September 26, 1941, 33–0 over the Florida Military Academy.

== Band ==
The Lakeland Senior High School Band was founded in 1924. They were the first of only eight High School bands in the country to have ever won 2 Sudler Flags of Honor. This distinction was awarded in 1986 and 1993.

== Notable alumni ==
- Lindsey Alley (1996), actress, cast member of The Mickey Mouse Club
- Alec Asher, former MLB baseball player
- Andy Bean, professional golfer
- Ahmad Black (2007), Tampa Bay Buccaneers player
- Keon Broxton, MLB outfielder for the New York Mets
- Charles T. Canady, U. S. Congressman (1992–2000), Florida Supreme Court Chief Justice
- Lawton Chiles (1948), U.S. Senator, 1971–1989, Governor of Florida, 1991–1998
- Jadrian Clark (2012), professional football quarterback
- Ronnie Ghent (1999), NFL player, New Orleans Saints
- Kay Hagan, U.S. Senator; niece of Lawton Chiles
- Rolijah Hardy (2023), college football player for the Indiana Hoosiers
- Arthur Hendrix, tennis player
- Allen Hunt (1982), talk radio host
- Drew Hutchison, MLB player with Pittsburgh Pirates
- Lee Janzen, professional golfer, two-time US Open winner
- Grady Judd, Sheriff of Polk County, Florida
- Willie Lampkin (2020), NFL player, Philadelphia Eagles
- Frances Langford, singer, entertainer and film actress
- Neva Jane Langley (1953), Miss America
- Josh Lucas, MLB pitcher for the Oakland Athletics
- Sona MacDonald (1979), European actress
- Aaron Marsh (Orchestra Department, Class of 1999), singer/songwriter, lead singer of Copeland
- Cormani McClain (2023), college football player, (Colorado Buffaloes, Florida Gators)
- Lauren Miller, actor and screenwriter
- Elliott Morgan (Musical Theatre Department, Class of 2005), actor, writer, producer, YouTube personality
- Quayshawn Nealy (2010), football player
- Karen Olivo, stage and television actor
- Wayne Peace (1980), football player
- Steve Pearce (2001), professional baseball player, 2018 World Series MVP
- Maurkice Pouncey (2007), NFL player, Pittsburgh Steelers
- Mike Pouncey (2007), NFL player, Miami Dolphins
- Boog Powell, MLB player, two-time World Series champion, four-time All-Star, 1970 American League MVP
- Chris Rainey (2007), NFL player, Pittsburgh Steelers
- Rey Robinson, 1972 track & field Olympian, former world record holder in 100 meter sprint
- Dennis A. Ross (1977), U.S. Congressman
- Chris Sale, MLB pitcher for Boston Red Sox and Chicago White Sox, six-time All-Star
- Susan Sherouse (Orchestra Department, Class of 2001), violinist
- Rod Smart (1995), NFL player
- Arian Smith (2020), NFL player, New York Jets
- Park Trammell, U.S. Senator; 21st Governor of Florida
- Rick Yancey, author
- Keon Zipperer (2019), college football player, Florida Gators

== Old Lakeland High School ==
The Old Lakeland High School is located at 400 North Florida Avenue in Lakeland and in 1993 was added to the National Register of Historic Places. Over the years the building has housed several different schools including the Lakeland Junior High School, Polk Opportunity Center and Lakeland Middle Academy (renamed the Lawton Chiles Middle Academy in 1999).
