= 2019 Orange Bowl =

Postseason college football bowl game

2019 Capital One Orange Bowl
- CFP New Year's Six; 86th Orange Bowl
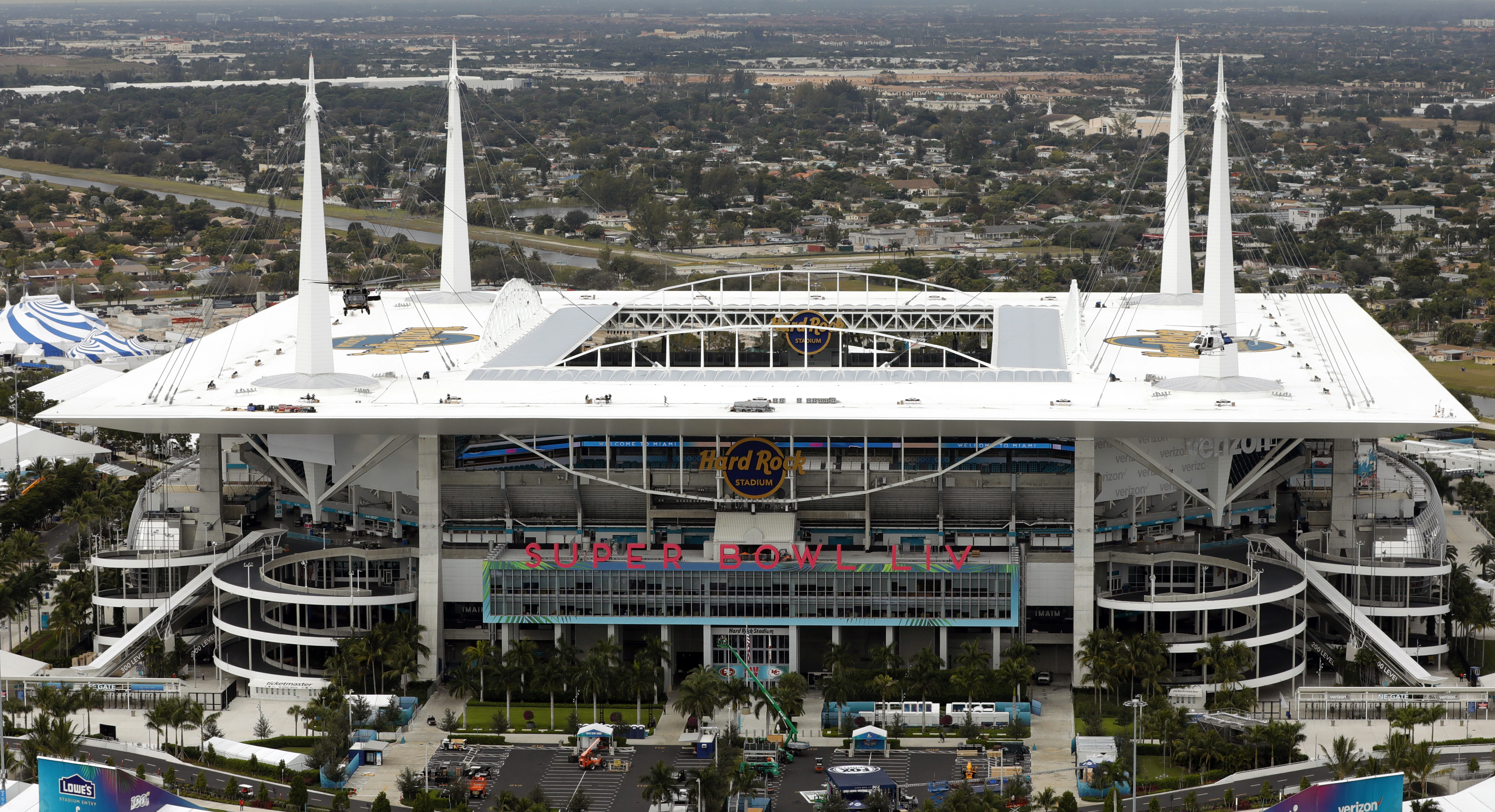
- Hard Rock Stadium in Miami Gardens, Florida, hosted the Orange Bowl.
Florida Gators	Virginia Cavaliers
(10–2)	(9–4)
SEC	ACC
36	28
Head coach: Dan Mullen	Head coach: Bronco Mendenhall
AP / Coaches / CFP; 6 / 7 / 9	AP / Coaches / CFP; RV / 25 / 24
	1	2	3	4	Total
Florida	14	10	3	9	36
Virginia	7	7	0	14	28
- Date: December 30, 2019
- Season: 2019
- Stadium: Hard Rock Stadium
- Location: Miami Gardens, Florida
- MVP: La'Mical Perine (RB, Florida)
- Favorite: Florida by 14.5 (55)
- Referee: Reggie Smith (Big 12)
- Attendance: 65,157

United States TV coverage
- Network: ESPN and ESPN Radio
- Announcers: ESPN: Steve Levy (play-by-play); Brian Griese (analyst); Todd McShay and Molly McGrath (sidelines); ESPN Radio: Sean Kelley, Barrett Jones, and Ian Fitzsimmons
- Nielsen ratings: 3.5 (6.07 million viewers)

The 2019 Orange Bowl was a college football bowl game played on December 30, 2019, with kickoff at 8:10 p.m. EST on ESPN. It was the 86th edition of the Orange Bowl, and one of the 2019–20 bowl games concluding the 2019 FBS football season. Sponsored by the Capital One Financial Corporation, the game was officially known as the Capital One Orange Bowl.

== Teams ==
The game matched the Florida Gators of the Southeastern Conference (SEC) and the Virginia Cavaliers of the Atlantic Coast Conference (ACC). This was the second meeting of these programs, with the Gators having won the first meeting, 55–10, in 1959.

=== Florida Gators ===
Florida entered the Orange Bowl with an overall 10–2 record (6–2 in conference). They finished their regular season second in the East Division of the SEC, behind Georgia. Entering the game, the Gators were 1–2 against ranked FBS opponents, defeating Auburn while losing to LSU and Georgia.

=== Virginia Cavaliers ===
Virginia entered the Orange bowl with an overall 9–4 record (6–2 in conference), having lost the ACC Championship Game to Clemson after finishing atop the ACC's Coastal Division. The Cavaliers were also 1–2 against ranked FBS opponents, defeating Virginia Tech while losing to Notre Dame and Clemson. Unranked in the AP Poll at the time they received their bowl invitation, they become the first AP-unranked participant in the Orange Bowl since Florida in the 1967 edition.

== Game summary ==
2019 Capital One Orange Bowl

Quarter	1	2	3	4	Total
No. 9 Florida	14	10	3	9	36
No. 24 Virginia	7	7	0	14	28

at Hard Rock Stadium • Miami Gardens, Florida

- Date: Monday, December 30, 2019
- Game time: 8:00 p.m. EST
- Game weather: Clear • Temperature: 75 °F (24 °C) • Wind: SE 1 mph
- Game attendance: 65,157
- Referee: Reggie Smith
- TV announcers (ESPN): Steve Levy (play-by-play), Brian Griese (analyst), Todd McShay and Molly McGrath (sideline)
- ESPN game summary

Game information

First Quarter

- (14:20) FLA – La’Mical Perine 61 yard rush, Evan McPherson kick (Drive: 3 plays, 75 yards, 0:40; Florida 7–0)
- (11:27) UVA – Bryce Perkins 34 yard pass to Terrell Jana, Brian Delaney kick (Drive: 1 play, 34 yards, 0:07; Tied 7–7)
- (6:26) FLA – Kyle Trask 16 yard pass to La’Mical Perine, Evan McPherson kick (Drive: 13 plays, 75 yards, 5:01; Florida 14–7)

Second Quarter

- (14:53) UVA – Bryce Perkins 9 yard pass to Hasise Dubois, Brian Delaney kick (Drive: 14 plays, 88 yards, 6:33; Tied 14–14)
- (9:39) FLA – Evan McPherson 23 yard field goal (Drive: 14 plays, 73 yards, 5:14; Florida 17–14)
- (2:13) FLA – La’Mical Perine 10 yard rush, Evan McPherson kick (Drive: 9 plays, 74 yards, 5:07; Florida 24–14)

Third Quarter

- (0:16) FLA – Evan McPherson 49 yard field goal (Drive: 8 plays, 58 yards, 2:56; Florida 27–14)

Fourth Quarter

- (13:05) UVA – Bryce Perkins 7 yard pass to Joe Reed, Brian Delaney kick (Drive: 6 plays, 75 yards, 2:11; Florida 27–21)
- (9:33) FLA – Kyle Trask 1 yard rush, 2-point pass failed (Drive: 7 plays, 65 yards, 3:32; Florida 33–21)
- (2:32) FLA – Evan McPherson 42 yard field goal (Drive: 7 plays, 72 yards, 2:39; Florida 36–21)
- (0:38) UVA – Bryce Perkins 2 yard pass to Hasise Dubois, Brian Delaney kick (Drive: 8 plays, 75 yards, 1:54; Florida 36–28)

=== Statistics ===
Statistics	FLA	UVA
First downs	25	20
Plays–yards	73–549	62–375
Rushes–yards	34–244	21–52
Passing yards	305	323
Passing: comp–att–int	24–39–1	28–41–1
Turnovers		
Time of possession	31:51	28:09

Team	Category	Player	Statistics
Florida	Passing	Kyle Trask	24/39, 305 yards, 1 TD, 1 INT
Florida	Rushing	La'Mical Perine	13 carries, 138 yards, 2 TD
Florida	Receiving	Van Jefferson	6 receptions, 129 yards
Virginia	Passing	Bryce Perkins	28/40, 323 yards, 4 TD, 1 INT
Virginia	Rushing	Bryce Perkins	14 carries, 24 yards
Virginia	Receiving	Terrell Jana	7 receptions, 126 yards, 1 TD
