= Josh Hammond =

American football player (born 1998)

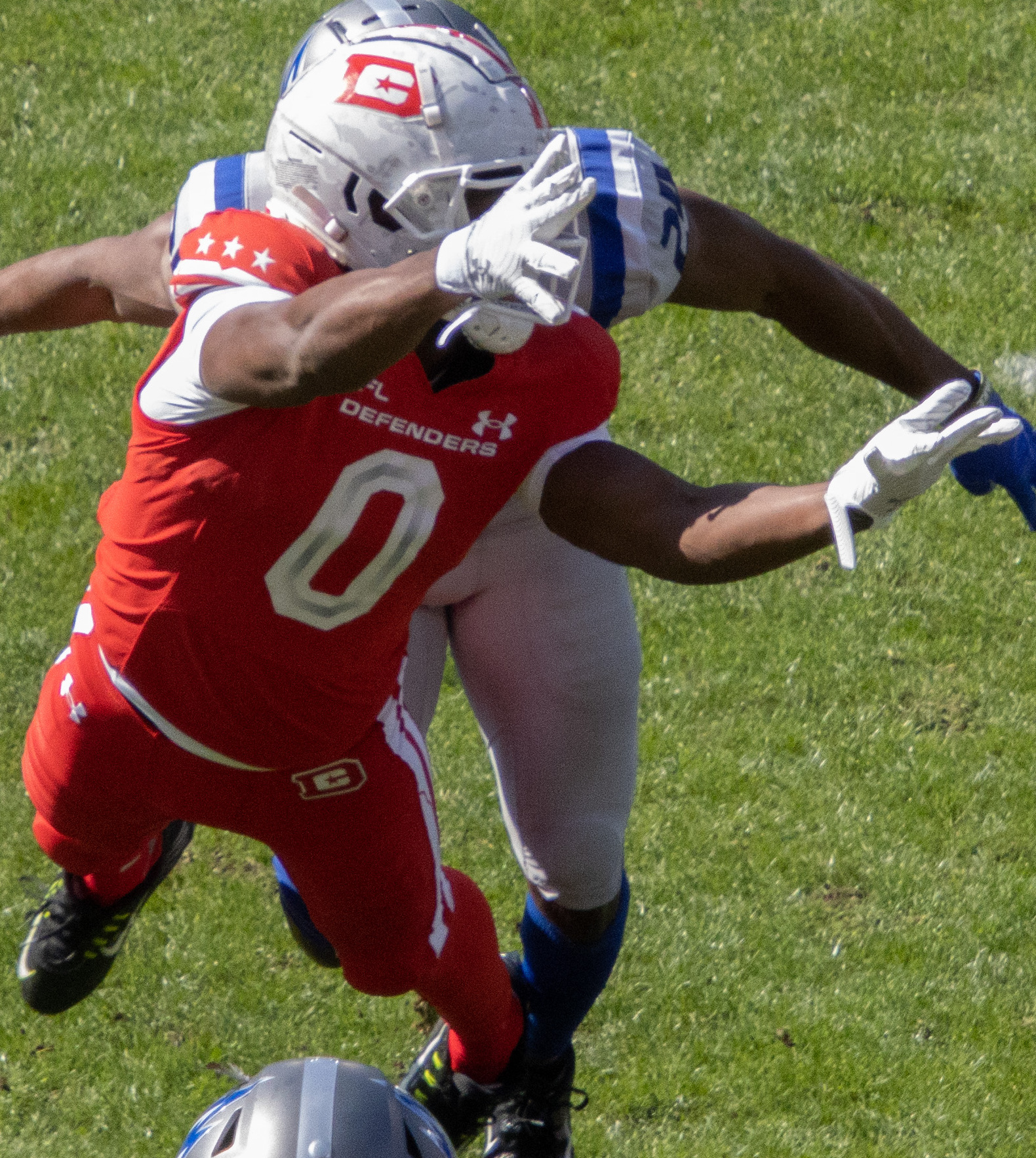
- Hammond with the DC Defenders in 2023

Los Angeles Chargers
- Title: Assistant Wide Receivers Coach & Assistant Special Teams Coach

Personal information
- Born: July 24, 1998 (age 28); Hallandale Beach, Florida, U.S.
- Listed height: 6 ft 0 in (1.83 m)
- Listed weight: 194 lb (88 kg)

Career information
- Position: Wide receiver (No. 81)
- High school: Hallandale (Hallandale Beach, Florida)
- College: Florida
- NFL draft: 2020: undrafted

Career history

Playing
- Jacksonville Jaguars (2020–2021); Philadelphia Eagles (2022)*; New England Patriots (2022)*; DC Defenders (2023); Denver Broncos (2023)*; DC Defenders (2024)*
- * Offseason or practice squad member only

Coaching
- Los Angeles Chargers (2024–2025) Offensive assistant; Los Angeles Chargers (2026–present) Assistant wide receivers & special teams
- Stats at Pro Football Reference

Josh Hammond (born July 24, 1998) is an American former football wide receiver who is the Assistant Wide Receivers & Assistant Special Teams Coach for the Los Angeles Chargers of the National Football League (NFL). He played college football at Florida, and has also played for the Jacksonville Jaguars, Philadelphia Eagles, New England Patriots, Denver Broncos of the National Football League (NFL), and the DC Defenders of the United Football League (UFL).

== College career ==
Hammond was a member of the Florida Gators for four seasons. He finished his collegiate career with 87 receptions for 1,138 yards and six touchdowns and 134 yards and two touchdowns rushing in 49 games played.

== Professional career ==
Pre-draft measurables
| Height | Weight | Arm length | Hand span | Wingspan |
|---|---|---|---|---|
| 6 ft 0 1/8 in (1.83 m) | 192 lb (87 kg) | 30 5/8 in (0.78 m) | 9 1/4 in (0.23 m) | 6 ft 2 3/8 in (1.89 m) |
All values from Pro Day

=== Jacksonville Jaguars ===
Hammond signed with the Jacksonville Jaguars as an undrafted free agent on April 25, 2020. He was waived on September 6, during final roster cuts and was re-signed to the practice squad the next day. Hammond remained on the practice squad for the 2020 season and signed a reserve/future contract with the Jaguars on January 4, 2021. He was cut by the Jaguars at the end of training camp on August 31, and was re-signed back to the team's practice squad. Hammond was elevated to the active roster on December 26, for the team's Week 16 game against the New York Jets and made his NFL debut in the game.

Hammond signed a reserve/future contract with the Jaguars on January 10, 2022. He was waived by Jacksonville on May 16.

=== Philadelphia Eagles ===
On May 17, 2022, Hammond was claimed off waivers by the Philadelphia Eagles. He was waived by the Eagles on July 26.

=== New England Patriots ===
On July 28, 2022, Hammond signed with the New England Patriots. He was released by New England on August 30.

=== DC Defenders ===
On November 17, 2022, Hammond was drafted by the DC Defenders of the XFL. He was released from his contract on August 21, 2023.

=== Denver Broncos ===
On August 22, 2023, Hammond signed with the Denver Broncos. He was released by the Broncos on August 29.

=== DC Defenders (second stint) ===
On October 19, 2023, Hammond re-signed with the DC Defenders. He announced his retirement from professional football on February 24, 2024.

== Coaching career ==
Hammond joined the coaching staff of the Los Angeles Chargers as an offensive assistant prior to the 2024 season. On May 22, 2026, Hammond was promoted to the role of wide receivers / assistant special teams coach.

== Personal life ==
Hammond is the younger brother of former Florida and NFL wide receiver Frankie Hammond. On March 16, 2024, Hammond announced he took a position on the Los Angeles Chargers coaching staff.
