= Van Jefferson =

American football player (born 1996)

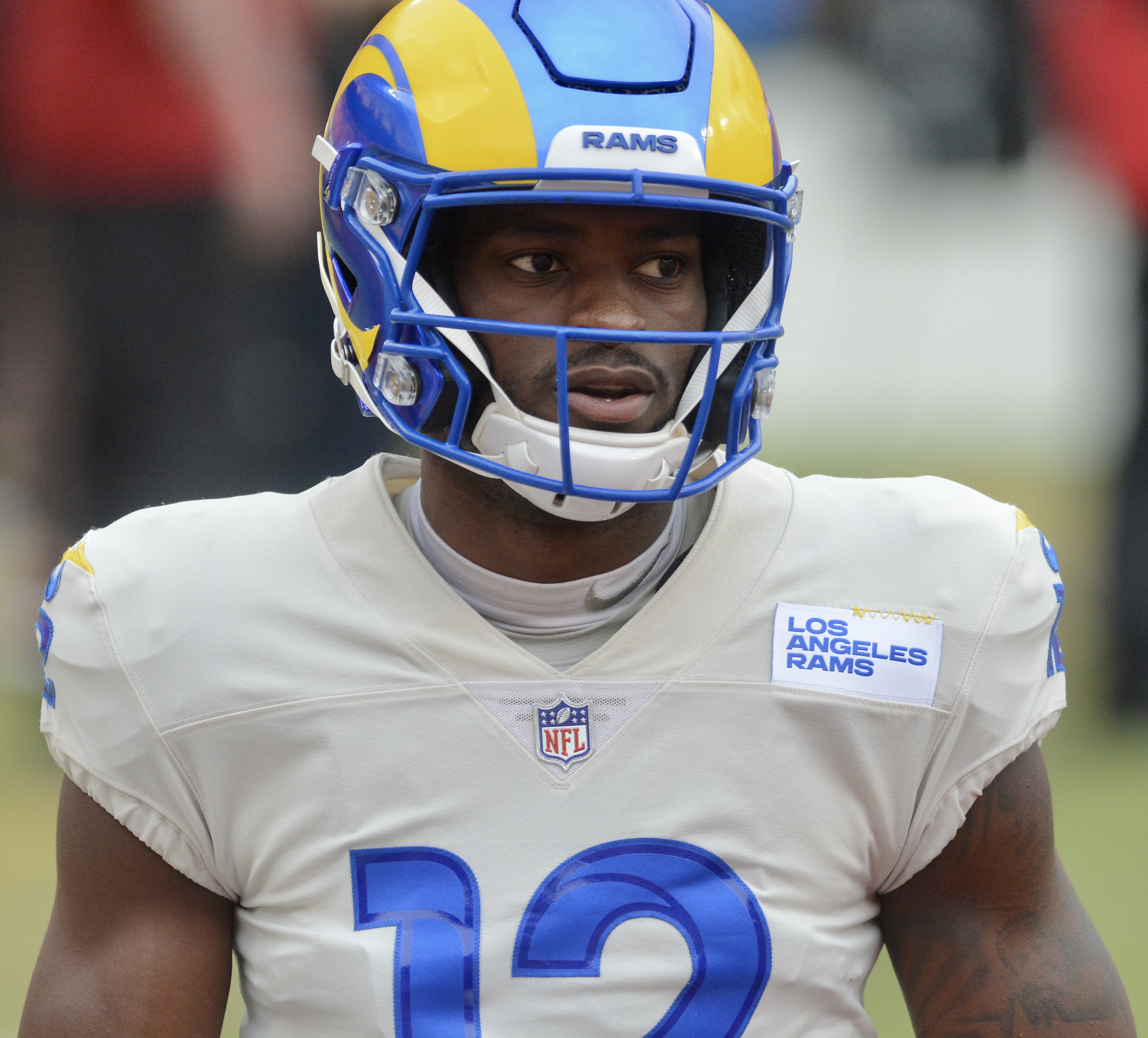
- Jefferson with the Los Angeles Rams in 2020

No. 12 – Washington Commanders
- Position: Wide receiver
- Roster status: Active

Personal information
- Born: July 26, 1996 (age 30); Brentwood, Tennessee, U.S.
- Listed height: 6 ft 1 in (1.85 m)
- Listed weight: 200 lb (91 kg)

Career information
- High school: Ravenwood (Brentwood)
- College: Ole Miss (2015–2017); Florida (2018–2019)
- NFL draft: 2020: 2nd round, 57th overall pick

Career history
- Los Angeles Rams (2020–2023); Atlanta Falcons (2023); Pittsburgh Steelers (2024); Tennessee Titans (2025); Washington Commanders (2026–present)

Awards and highlights
- Super Bowl champion (LVI)

Career NFL statistics as of 2025
- Receptions: 166
- Receiving yards: 2,226
- Receiving touchdowns: 13
- Stats at Pro Football Reference

Vanchi LaShawn Jefferson Jr. (born July 26, 1996) is an American professional football wide receiver for the Washington Commanders of the National Football League (NFL). Jefferson played college football for the Ole Miss Rebels and Florida Gators and was selected by the Los Angeles Rams in the second round of the 2020 NFL draft, where he won Super Bowl LVI during the 2021 season. He has also played for the Atlanta Falcons, Pittsburgh Steelers, and Tennessee Titans.

== Early life ==
Jefferson was born on July 26, 1996, in Brentwood, Tennessee, later attending Ravenwood High School. As a junior, he caught 87 passes for 1,251 yards and 14 touchdowns. As a senior, he was named first team All-State after recording 67 receptions for 1,223 yards and 13 touchdowns. He initially committed to play college football at Georgia. However, he de-committed in January of his senior year and flipped his commitment to Ole Miss, choosing the Rebels over offers from Georgia, Michigan, Oklahoma, and Tennessee.

== College career ==
In 2015, Jefferson redshirted his true freshman season at Ole Miss. In 2016, as a redshirt freshman, he had 49 catches for 543 yards and three touchdowns. Jefferson finished his redshirt sophomore season with 42 receptions for 456 yards and one touchdown. Following the 2017 season, Jefferson announced his intent to transfer from Ole Miss after the program was sanctioned by the NCAA, ultimately choosing to continue his collegiate career at Florida.

Jefferson was granted immediate eligibility to play for Florida after transferring after receiving waivers from the NCAA and the Southeastern Conference (SEC). In 2018, his first season with the Gators, he led the team with 35 receptions, 503 receiving yards, and six touchdown receptions. As a senior, he caught 49 passes for 657 yards and six touchdowns. He caught six passes for 129 yards against Virginia in the 2019 Orange Bowl, his final career game. Jefferson finished his collegiate career with 175 receptions for 2,159 yards and 16 touchdowns in 45 games played.

== Professional career ==
Pre-draft measurables
Height	Weight	Arm length	Hand span	Wingspan	Wonderlic
6 ft 1 1/2 in (1.87 m)	200 lb (91 kg)	32 3/4 in (0.83 m)	9 1/8 in (0.23 m)	6 ft 5 1/8 in (1.96 m)	12
All values from NFL Combine

=== Los Angeles Rams ===
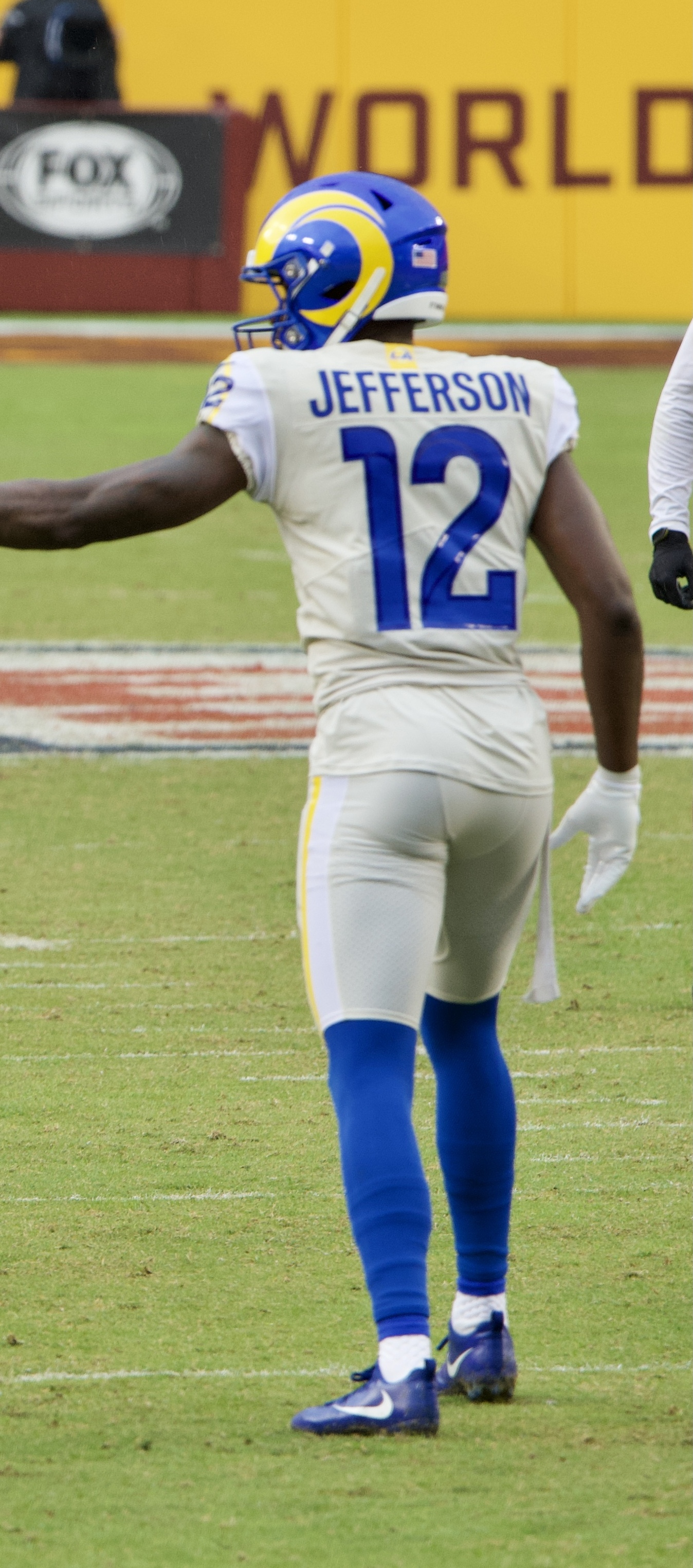
Jefferson playing with the Los Angeles Rams in 2020

Jefferson was selected by the Los Angeles Rams in the second round with the 57th overall pick in the 2020 NFL draft. The Rams previously traded wide receiver Brandin Cooks to the Houston Texans to acquire the pick. In Week 11 of the 2020 season, against the Tampa Bay Buccaneers, he recorded his first professional receiving touchdown. In the Divisional Round of the playoffs against the Green Bay Packers, Jefferson recorded 6 catches for 46 yards and his first playoff touchdown during the 32–18 loss.

In 2021, Jefferson saw an increase in production playing under new Rams quarterback Matthew Stafford and in light of a season-ending injury to teammate Robert Woods. He finished the regular season with 50 receptions for 802 yards and six touchdowns. Jefferson became a Super Bowl champion when the Rams beat the Cincinnati Bengals 23–20 in Super Bowl LVI. In the Super Bowl, Jefferson recorded four catches for 23 yards.

On September 24, 2022, Jefferson was placed on injured reserve. He was designated to return from injured reserve on October 24, 2022, and activated for Week 8. On December 8, 2022, Jefferson caught the game winning touchdown pass from newly signed quarterback Baker Mayfield to beat the Las Vegas Raiders.

With Cooper Kupp starting the season on injured reserve, Jefferson began 2023 as the Rams' No. 1 receiver and totaled eight receptions for 108 yards through the first four weeks. However, with the swift emergence of rookie Puka Nacua as the team's most explosive receiver, Jefferson's role was greatly diminished. When Kupp returned to the starting lineup in Week 5 against Philadelphia, Jefferson played only two snaps and did not catch a pass.

=== Atlanta Falcons ===
On October 10, 2023, Jefferson was traded to the Atlanta Falcons for a swap of 2025 late round picks.

Jefferson played 12 games for the Falcons, totalling 12 receptions for 101 yards. Jefferson saw only 27% of the offensive snaps in his first outing with the team in Week 6, but saw a significant uptick playing 49% and 71% of offensive snaps the following two weeks before going on to average 39% of offensive snaps the remainder of his tenure.

=== Pittsburgh Steelers ===
On March 18, 2024, Jefferson signed a one-year contract with the Pittsburgh Steelers.

Jefferson finished the regular season making 24 total receptions for 276 yards and two touchdowns as the Steelers finished 10-7 and entered the playoffs as the sixth seeded team in the AFC.

During the wild card round, Jefferson caught one touchdown pass on a pass from Russell Wilson as the Steelers lost 14–28 to the Baltimore Ravens.

=== Tennessee Titans ===
On March 14, 2025, Jefferson signed with the Tennessee Titans on a one-year, $2.5 million contract.

Jefferson began the preseason as a starter, listed as the third wide receiver on the depth chart. He caught three passes for 102 yards and a touchdown in the final preseason game, a 23–13 victory over the Minnesota Vikings. Jefferson, however, began the regular season as the fourth wide receiver on the roster behind rookie Elic Ayomanor. He finished the season with 29 catches for 350 yards and one touchdown through 16 games (including seven starts). On January 3, 2026, Jefferson was placed on season-ending injured reserve due to a forearm injury.

=== Washington Commanders ===
On March 17, 2026, Jefferson signed a one-year contract with the Washington Commanders. He was waived by the Commanders as a part of final roster cuts on August 30. On September 7, Washington re–signed Jefferson to their practice squad. On October 28, the Commanders signed him to their active roster.

== NFL career statistics ==
=== Regular season ===
Year	Team	Games		Receiving					Rushing					Fumbles	
Year	Team	GP	GS	Rec	Yds	Avg	Lng	TD	Att	Yds	Avg	Lng	TD	Fum	Lost
2020	LAR	16	0	19	220	11.6	31	1	1	-1	-1.0	-1	0	0	0
2021	LAR	17	17	50	802	16.0	79T	6	2	20	10.0	10	0	0	0
2022	LAR	11	9	24	369	15.4	39	3	0	0	0.0	0	0	0	0
2023	LAR	5	4	8	108	13.5	46	0	1	4	4.0	4	0	0	0
2023	ATL	12	5	12	101	8.4	14	0	0	0	0.0	0	0	0	0
2024	PIT	17	12	24	276	11.5	43	2	0	0	0.0	0	0	0	0
2025	TEN	16	7	29	350	12.1	43	1	0	0	0.0	0	0	0	0
Career		94	54	166	2,226	13.4	79T	13	4	23	5.8	10	0	0	0

=== Postseason ===
Year	Team	Games		Receiving					Rushing					Fumbles	
Year	Team	GP	GS	Rec	Yds	Avg	Lng	TD	Att	Yds	Avg	Lng	TD	Fum	Lost
2020	LAR	2	1	6	46	7.7	16	1	0	0	0.0	0	0	0	0
2021	LAR	4	4	9	102	11.3	41	0	1	15	15.0	15	0	0	0
2024	PIT	1	1	2	37	18.5	30T	1	0	0	0.0	0	0	0	0
Career		7	6	17	185	10.9	41	2	1	15	15.0	15	0	0	0

== Personal life ==
Jefferson is the son of former NFL wide receiver Shawn Jefferson. He is married and has three sons and a daughter. His second son was born while he played in Super Bowl LVI.
