= La'Mical Perine =

American football player (born 1998)

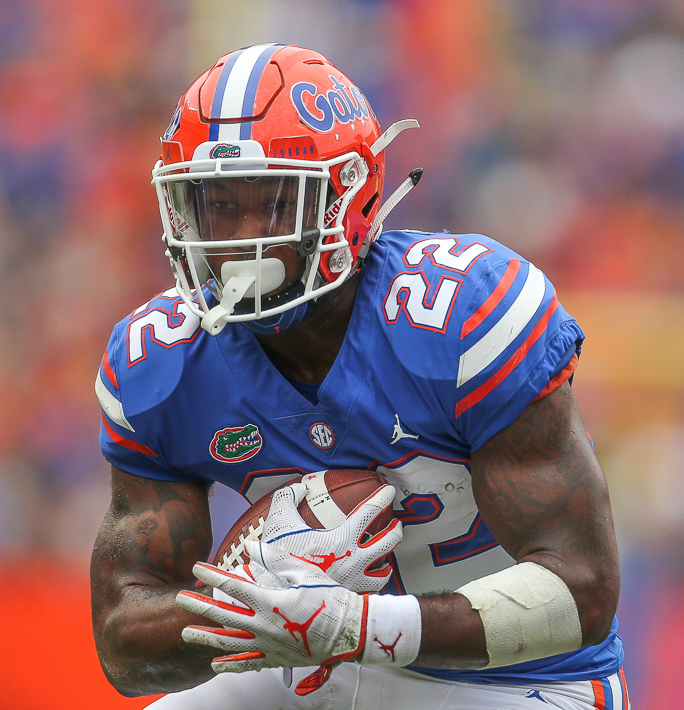
- Perine with the Florida Gators in 2018

Profile
- Position: Running back

Personal information
- Born: January 30, 1998 (age 28); Mobile, Alabama, U.S.
- Listed height: 5 ft 11 in (1.80 m)
- Listed weight: 216 lb (98 kg)

Career information
- High school: Theodore (Theodore, Alabama)
- College: Florida (2016–2019)
- NFL draft: 2020: 4th round, 120th overall pick

Career history
- New York Jets (2020–2021); Philadelphia Eagles (2022)*; Miami Dolphins (2022)*; Kansas City Chiefs (2022–2023); Pittsburgh Steelers (2024)*; Green Bay Packers (2024)*; Pittsburgh Steelers (2024)*
- * Offseason or practice squad member only

Awards and highlights
- 2× Super Bowl champion (LVII, LVIII)

Career NFL statistics as of 2024
- Rushing yards: 340
- Rushing average: 3.6
- Rushing touchdowns: 2
- Receptions: 14
- Receiving yards: 96
- Stats at Pro Football Reference

La'Mical Perine (born January 30, 1998) is an American professional football running back. He played college football for the Florida Gators and was selected by the New York Jets in the fourth round of the 2020 NFL draft.

== Early life ==
Perine grew up in Mobile, Alabama and attended Theodore High School, where he played basketball and football. As a junior, Perine ran 1,416 yards, scored 16 touchdowns, and was named honorable mention Class 7A All-State. He rushed for 1,654 yards and 15 touchdowns in his senior year and was named first-team Class 7A All-State. Rated a three-star recruit, Perine committed to play college football at the University of Florida, turning down an offer from Alabama.

== College career ==
Perine finished his true freshman season as Florida's second leading rusher with 421 yards on 91 carries with a touchdown while also catching nine passes for 161 yards and a touchdown. Although he entered his sophomore year as the Gators second-string running back, Perine was the team's leading rusher with 562 yards and eight touchdowns. As a junior, his first full season as Florida's starting running back, Perine rushed for 826 yards and seven touchdowns on 134 carries with 13 receptions for 170 yards and a touchdown.

In his senior season, Perine rushed for 677 yards and six touchdowns and caught 40 passes for 262 yards and five touchdowns. He was named the MVP of the 2019 Orange Bowl after rushing for a career-high 138 yards and two touchdowns on 13 carries and catching five passes for 43 yards and another touchdown in the Gators' 36–28 victory over Virginia. Perine finished his collegiate career with 2,485 yards (8th most in school history) and 22 rushing touchdowns on 493 carries and 72 receptions for 674 yards and eight touchdowns.

== Professional career ==
Pre-draft measurables
Height	Weight	Arm length	Hand span	Wingspan	40-yard dash	10-yard split	20-yard split	20-yard shuttle	Three-cone drill	Vertical jump	Broad jump	Bench press
5 ft 10 3/4 in (1.80 m)	216 lb (98 kg)	31 5/8 in (0.80 m)	10 1/4 in (0.26 m)	6 ft 4 3/8 in (1.94 m)	4.62 s	1.52 s	2.74 s	4.31 s	7.13 s	35.0 in (0.89 m)	9 ft 10 in (3.00 m)	22 reps
All values from NFL Combine

=== New York Jets ===
Perine was selected by the New York Jets in the fourth round with the 120th overall pick in the 2020 NFL draft. He made his NFL debut in Week 2 of the 2020 season against the San Francisco 49ers. He had three carries for 17 rushing yards in the 31–13 loss. Perine scored his first career touchdown on October 25, 2020, in an 18–10 loss to the Buffalo Bills. He was placed on injured reserve on November 24, 2020, with a high ankle sprain. On December 26, 2020, Perine was activated off the injured reserve list. He was placed on the reserve/COVID-19 list by the team on December 30, 2020. Perine finished his rookie season with 64 carries for 232 rushing yards and two rushing touchdowns to go along with 11 receptions for 63 receiving yards in ten games. Perine was used sparingly in the 2021 season, only appearing in four games.

On August 30, 2022, Perine was released by the Jets during final roster cuts.

=== Philadelphia Eagles ===
On September 1, 2022, Perine was signed to the practice squad of the Philadelphia Eagles. He was released on September 7.

=== Miami Dolphins ===
On October 18, 2022, Perine was signed to the Miami Dolphins practice squad.

=== Kansas City Chiefs ===
On January 28, 2023, Perine was signed to the Kansas City Chiefs practice squad. Perine won Super Bowl LVII when the Chiefs defeated the Eagles. He signed a reserve/future contract on February 15, 2023.

On August 29, 2023, Perine was waived by the Chiefs and re-signed to the practice squad. He was promoted to the active roster on December 24. The Chiefs won Super Bowl LVIII 25–22 against the San Francisco 49ers to give Perine his second straight Super Bowl ring.

On May 17, 2024, Perine was released by the Chiefs.

=== Pittsburgh Steelers (first stint) ===
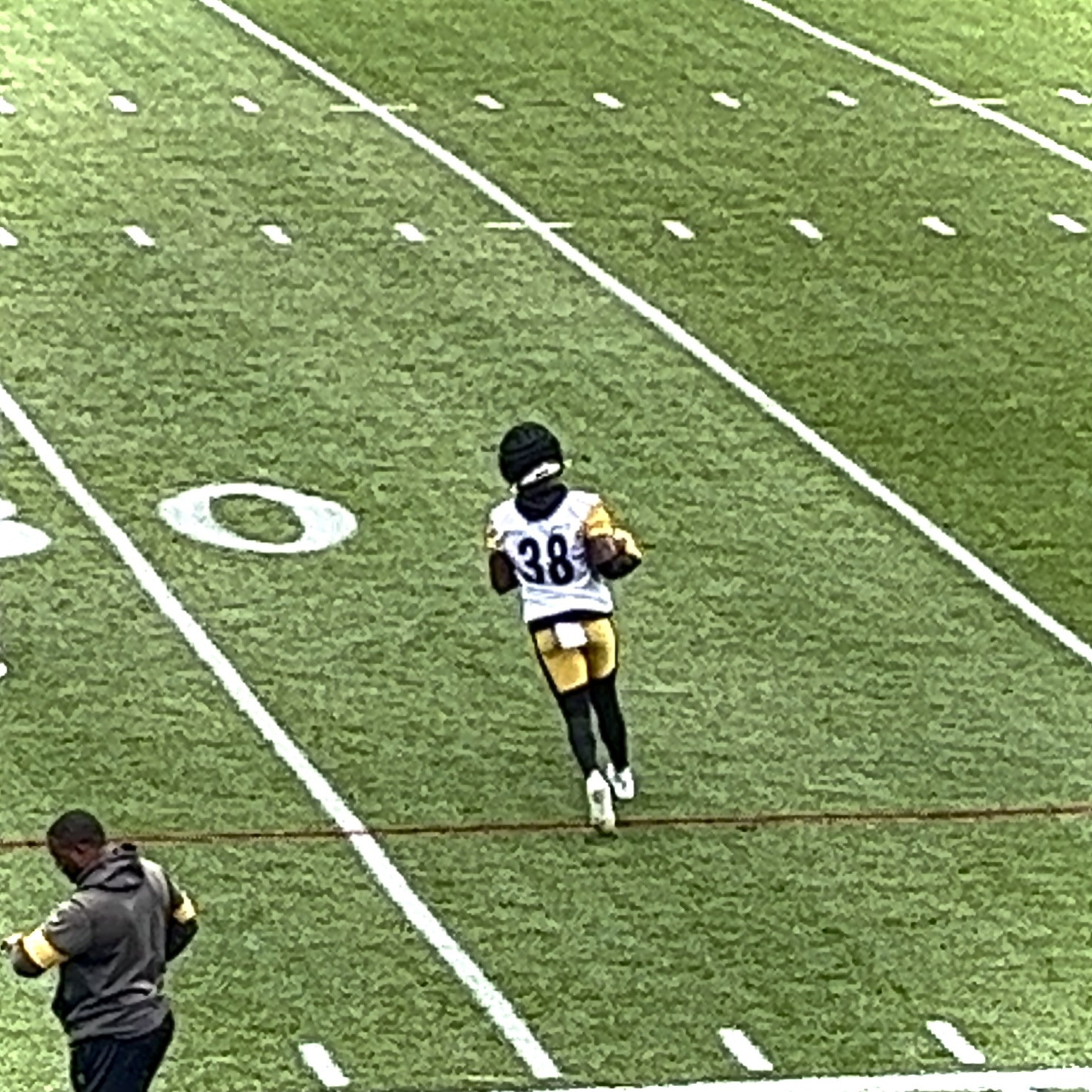
Perine during Steelers training camp in 2024

On May 23, 2024, Perine signed a one-year contract with the Pittsburgh Steelers. He was waived by the Steelers on August 27, 2024.

=== Green Bay Packers ===
Perine was signed to the Green Bay Packers practice squad on August 30, 2024. He was released on September 10, 2024.

=== Pittsburgh Steelers (second stint) ===
On October 1, 2024, Perine was signed to the Pittsburgh Steelers practice squad. He was released on October 29.

== Personal life ==
Perine is a cousin of NFL running back Samaje Perine and NFL linebacker Myles Jack.

La'Mical was born to Terrance Perine and Sabrina Dixon, but his father was absent from his early life. His dad played at Auburn, while his mom played basketball. He was raised by his mother and his stepfather, Jimmie.
