= SEC Nation =

2014 American television series

- Genre: Sports
- Starring: Matt Barrie; Tim Tebow; Chase Daniel; Roman Harper; Paul Finebaum; Marion Crowder; Marty Smith; Ryan McGee
- Opening theme: "Party Wherever We Go" by Robert Randolph and the Family Band (performed by Megan Moroney)
- Country of origin: United States

Production
- Production locations: See locations below (2014–present)
- Running time: 180 minutes

Original release
- Network: SEC Network
- Release: 2014 – present

SEC Nation is a pre-game show broadcast by SEC Network as part of its coverage of college football.

Modeled after ESPN's College GameDay, it broadcasts on Saturday mornings during the regular season from the campus of a Southeastern Conference (SEC) school, and features news and analysis of the day's upcoming games in the SEC.

== History ==
The series premiered in 2014 as part of SEC Network's launch slate of studio programming; for its inaugural season, the program would be hosted by ESPN college football commentator Joe Tessitore, joined by NFL players and SEC alumni Tim Tebow and Marcus Spears, radio host Paul Finebaum, and reporter Kaylee Hartung.

Its format is modelled after ESPN's long-running College GameDay, albeit with changes to account for the "pageantry" and "flavor" of SEC football, such as an "intimate" stage constructed near a location on the hosting campus where fans are naturally gathering (aiming to be "among" an existing crowd, rather than creating a crowd), and a tour bus that would be used for feature segments highlighting the culture of the host city. SEC Nation visited all 14 SEC schools throughout its inaugural season.

== Personalities ==
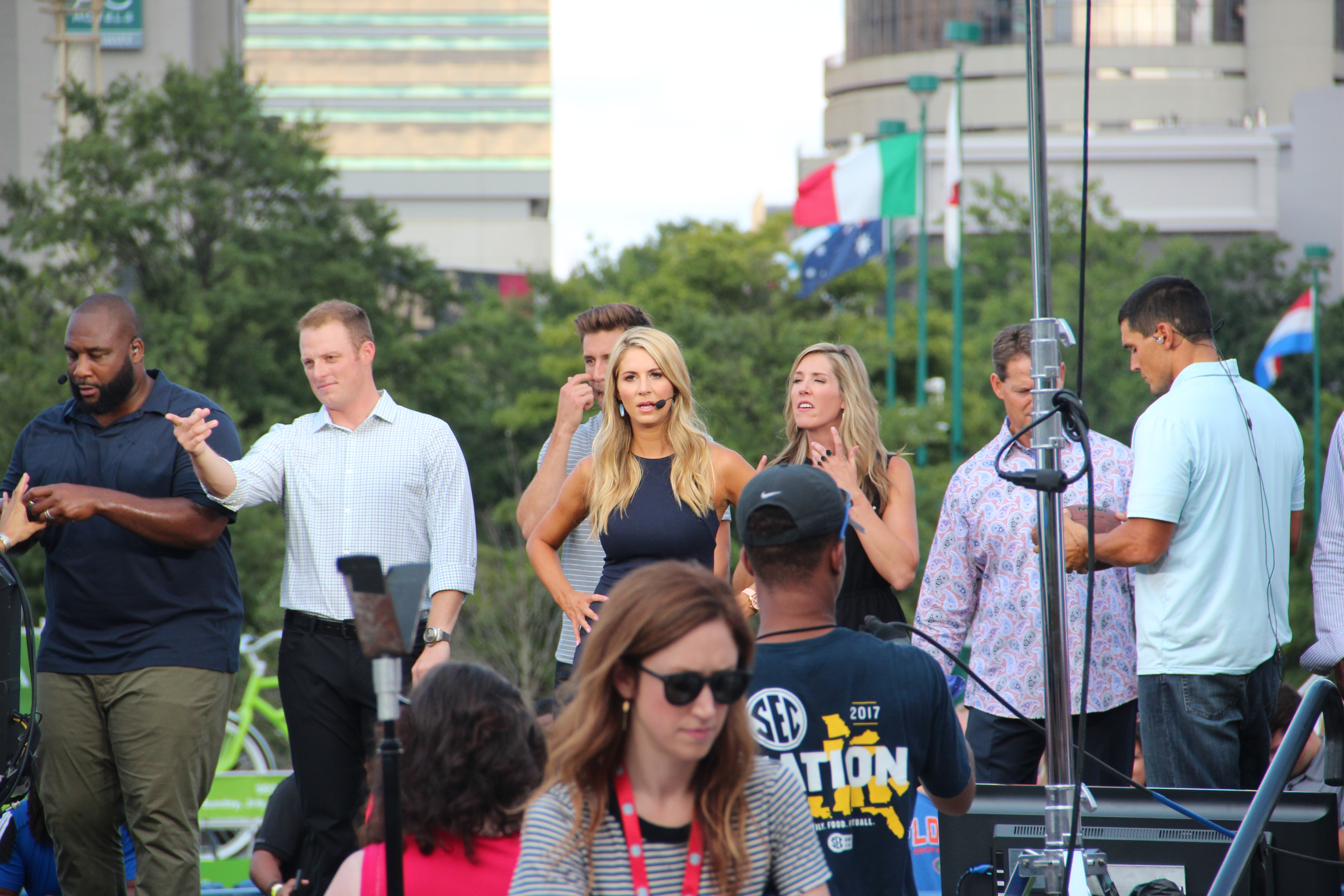
SEC Nation filming at Centennial Olympic Park, 2018

=== Current ===
- Matt Barrie: (Host, 2026–present)
- Paul Finebaum: (Analyst, 2014–2019; 2021–present)
- Tim Tebow: (Analyst, 2014–present)
- Chase Daniel: (Analyst, 2026–present)
- Roman Harper: (Analyst, 2020–present)
- Marion Crowder: (Reporter, 2026–present)
- Marty Smith: (Reporter/Contributor, 2019–present)
- Ryan McGee: (Reporter/Contributor, 2019–present)

=== Former ===
- Joe Tessitore: (Host, 2014–2015)
- Kaylee Hartung: (Reporter, 2014–2015)
- Greg McElroy: (Analyst, 2015)
- Maria Taylor: (Host, 2016)
- Lauren Sisler: (Reporter, 2017–2018)
- Marcus Spears: (Analyst, 2014–2019)
- Laura Rutledge: (Host, 2017–2025; Reporter, 2016)
- Jordan Rodgers: (Analyst, 2020–2025)

== Locations ==
=== 2014 season ===
Date	Visitor		Host		City	Location	Notes
August 28, 2014	**No. 21 Texas A&M**	**52**	No. 9 South Carolina	28	Columbia, SC	Gamecock Park	
August 30, 2014	Arkansas	21	**No. 6 Auburn**	**45**	Auburn, AL	Campus Green	
September 6, 2014	**No. 15 Ole Miss**	**41**	Vanderbilt	3	Nashville, TN	Outside LP Field	Rivalry
September 13, 2014	Kentucky	30	**Florida**	**36^{3OT}**	Gainesville, FL	Plaza of the Americas	Rivalry
September 20, 2014	Florida	21	**No. 3 Alabama**	**42**	Tuscaloosa, AL	Outside Moore Hall	Rivalry
September 27, 2014	Tennessee	32	**No. 12 Georgia**	**35**	Athens, GA	Myers Quad	Rivalry
October 4, 2014	No. 6 Texas A&M	31	**No. 12 Mississippi State**	**48**	Starkville, MS	The Junction	
October 11, 2014	**No. 7 Alabama**	**14**	Arkansas	13	Fayetteville, AR	Victory Village	
October 18, 2014	Tennessee	3	**No. 3 Ole Miss**	**34**	Oxford, MS	The Grove	Rivalry
October 25, 2014	**No. 1 Mississippi State**	**45**	Kentucky	31	Lexington, KY	Purple Lot	
November 1, 2014	Kentucky	10	**Missouri**	**20**	Columbia, MO	Francis Quadrangle	
November 8, 2014	**No. 6 Alabama**	**20^{OT}**	No. 19 LSU	13	Baton Rouge, LA	Lot 106	Rivalry
November 15, 2014	**Missouri**	**34**	No. 24 Texas A&M	27	College Station, TX	Spence Park	
November 22, 2014	**No. 19 Missouri**	**29**	Tennessee	21	Knoxville, TN	Ayres Hall	
November 29, 2014	No. 4 Mississippi State	17	**No. 19 Ole Miss**	**31**	Oxford, MS	The Grove	Egg Bowl
December 6, 2014	**No. 1 Alabama**	**42**	No. 14 Missouri	13	Atlanta, GA	Georgia World Congress Center	SEC Championship Game
January 1, 2015	**No. 4 Ohio State**	**42**	No. 1 Alabama	35	New Orleans, LA	Outside Mercedes-Benz Superdome	Sugar Bowl (CFP Semi-final)

=== 2015 season ===
Date	Visitor		Host		City	Location	Notes
September 5, 2015	UTEP	13	**No. 18 Arkansas**	**48**	Fayetteville, AR	Victory Village	First non-conference game to be featured on SEC Nation.
September 12, 2015	**No. 10 Georgia**	**31**	Vanderbilt	14	Nashville, TN	Ingram Commons	Rivalry
September 19, 2015	No. 18 Auburn	21	**No. 13 LSU**	**45**	Baton Rouge, LA	Walk-On's	Rivalry
September 26, 2015	Tennessee	27	**Florida**	**28**	Gainesville, FL	Plaza of the Americas	Rivalry
October 3, 2015	**No. 13 Alabama**	**38**	No. 8 Georgia	10	Athens, GA	Myers Quad	Rivalry
October 10, 2015	No. 19 Georgia	31	**Tennessee**	**38**	Knoxville, TN	Ayres Hall	Rivalry
October 17, 2015	**No. 10 Alabama**	**41**	No. 9 Texas A&M	23	College Station, TX	Spence Park	
October 24, 2015	Tennessee	14	**No. 8 Alabama**	**19**	Tuscaloosa, AL	Outside Moore Hall	Third Saturday in October
October 31, 2015	**Tennessee**	**52**	Kentucky	21	Lexington, KY	Purple Lot	Rivalry
November 5, 2015	**No. 24 Mississippi State**	**31**	Missouri	13	Columbia, MO	Inside Memorial Stadium	
November 7, 2015	**Arkansas**	**53^{OT}**	No. 19 Ole Miss	52	Oxford, MS	The Grove	Arkansas–Ole Miss football rivalry
November 14, 2015	**No. 3 Alabama**	**31**	No. 20 Mississippi State	6	Starkville, MS	The Junction	Rivalry
November 21, 2015	**The Citadel**	**23**	South Carolina	22	Columbia, SC	Gamecock Park	
November 28, 2015	**No. 2 Alabama**	**29**	Auburn	13	Auburn, AL	Campus Green	Iron Bowl
December 5, 2015	No. 18 Florida	15	**No. 2 Alabama**	**29**	Atlanta, GA	Georgia World Congress Center	SEC Championship Game (rivalry)
December 31, 2015	No. 3 Michigan State	0	**No. 2 Alabama**	**38**	Arlington, TX	Outside AT&T Stadium	Cotton Bowl Classic (CFP Semi-final)
January 11, 2016	**No. 2 Alabama**	**45**	No. 1 Clemson	40	Glendale, AZ	Inside University of Phoenix Stadium	CFP National Championship Game (rivalry)

=== 2016 season ===
Date	Visitor		Host		City	Location	Notes
September 1, 2016	Appalachian State	13	**No. 9 Tennessee**	**20^{OT}**	Knoxville, TN	Ayres Hall	
September 3, 2016	No. 16 UCLA	24	**Texas A&M**	**31^{OT}**	College Station, TX	Spence Park	
September 10, 2016	South Carolina	14	**Mississippi State**	**27**	Starkville, MS	The Junction	
September 17, 2016	**No. 1 Alabama**	**48**	No. 19 Ole Miss	43	Oxford, MS	The Grove	Rivalry
September 24, 2016	No. 18 LSU	13	**Auburn**	**18**	Auburn, AL	Wellness Kitchen Green Space	Rivalry
October 1, 2016	**No. 11 Tennessee**	**34**	No. 25 Georgia	31	Athens, GA	Myers Quad	Rivalry
October 8, 2016	–	–	-	-	Charlotte, NC	SEC Network Studios	Originally scheduled to be LSU at No. 18 Florida, but the game was postponed due to Hurricane Matthew.
October 15, 2016	**No. 1 Alabama**	**49**	No. 9 Tennessee	10	Knoxville, TN	Ayres Hall	Third Saturday in October
October 22, 2016	Mississippi State	38	**Kentucky**	**40**	Lexington, KY	Purple Lot	
October 29, 2016	**No. 12 Florida**	**24**	Georgia	10	Jacksonville, FL	Outside EverBank Field	Rivalry
November 5, 2016	No. 10 Florida	10	**Arkansas**	**31**	Fayetteville, AR	Old Main	
November 12, 2016	South Carolina	7	**No. 22 Florida**	**20**	Gainesville, FL	Plaza of the Americas	
November 19, 2016	**No. 21 Florida**	**16**	No. 16 LSU	10	Baton Rouge, LA	Walk-On's/Inside Tiger Stadium	Rivalry
November 26, 2016	No. 16 Auburn	12	**No. 1 Alabama**	**30**	Tuscaloosa, AL	Outside Moore Hall	Iron Bowl
December 3, 2016	**No. 1 Alabama**	**54**	No. 15 Florida	16	Atlanta, GA	Georgia World Congress Center	SEC Championship Game (rivalry)
December 31, 2016	No. 4 Washington	7	**No. 1 Alabama**	**24**	Atlanta, GA	Inside the Georgia Dome	Peach Bowl (CFP Semi-final)
January 9, 2017	**No. 2 Clemson**	**35**	No. 1 Alabama	31	Tampa, FL	Inside Raymond James Stadium	CFP National Championship Game (rivalry)

=== 2017 season ===
Date	Visitor		Host		City	Location	Notes
September 2, 2017	**No. 11 Michigan**	**33**	No. 17 Florida	17	Arlington, TX	Outside AT&T Stadium	Advocare Classic
September 9, 2017	**South Carolina**	**31**	Missouri	13	Columbia, MO	Francis Quadrangle	Mayor's Cup
September 16, 2017	No. 12 LSU	7	**Mississippi State**	**37**	Starkville, MS	The Junction	Rivalry
September 23, 2017	**No. 1 Alabama**	**59**	Vanderbilt	0	Nashville, TN	Ingram Commons	
September 30, 2017	**No. 7 Georgia**	**41**	Tennessee	0	Knoxville, TN	Ayres Hall	Rivalry
October 7, 2017	**LSU**	**17**	No. 21 Florida	16	Gainesville, FL	Plaza of the Americas	Rivalry
October 14, 2017	Missouri	28	**No. 4 Georgia**	**53**	Athens, GA	Special Collections Library	
October 21, 2017	Tennessee	7	**No. 1 Alabama**	**45**	Tuscaloosa, AL	Outside Moore Hall	Third Saturday in October
October 28, 2017	**No. 3 Georgia**	**42**	Florida	7	Jacksonville, FL	Outside EverBank Field	Rivalry
November 4, 2017	No. 19 LSU	10	**No. 1 Alabama**	**24**	Tuscaloosa, AL	Outside Moore Hall	Rivalry
November 11, 2017	No. 2 Georgia	17	**No. 10 Auburn**	**40**	Auburn, AL	Wellness Kitchen Green Space	Deep South's Oldest Rivalry
November 18, 2017	Kentucky	13	**No. 7 Georgia**	**42**	Athens, GA	Myers Quad	
November 25, 2017	**No. 4 Clemson**	**34**	South Carolina	10	Columbia, SC	Gamecock Park	Palmetto Bowl
December 2, 2017	**No. 6 Georgia**	**28**	No. 4 Auburn	7	Atlanta, GA	Georgia World Congress Center	SEC Championship Game (rivalry)
January 1, 2018	**No. 4 Alabama**	**24**	No. 1 Clemson	6	New Orleans, LA	Outside Mercedes-Benz Superdome	Sugar Bowl (CFP Semi-final) (rivalry)
January 8, 2018	**No. 4 Alabama**	**26^{OT}**	No. 3 Georgia	23	Atlanta, GA	Georgia World Congress Center	CFP National Championship Game (rivalry)

=== 2018 season ===
Date	Visitor		Host		City	Location	Notes
August 30, 2018	Northwestern State	7	**Texas A&M**	**59**	College Station, TX	Kyle Field	
September 1, 2018	**No. 17 West Virginia**	**40**	Tennessee	14	Charlotte, NC	Bank of America Stadium	Belk Kickoff Game
September 8, 2018	**No. 3 Georgia**	**41**	**No. 24 South Carolina**	17	Columbia, SC	Gamecock Park	Rivalry
September 15, 2018	**No. 1 Alabama**	**62**	Ole Miss	7	Oxford, MS	The Grove	Rivalry
September 22, 2018	No. 22 Texas A&M	23	**No. 1 Alabama**	**45**	Tuscaloosa, AL	Outside Moore Hall	
September 29, 2018	**Florida**	**13**	No. 23 Mississippi State	6	Starkville, MS	The Junction	
October 6, 2018	No. 5 LSU	19	**No. 22 Florida**	**27**	Gainesville, FL	Plaza of the Americas	Rivalry
October 13, 2018	**Tennessee**	**30**	No. 21 Auburn	24	Auburn, AL	Wellness Kitchen Green Space	Rivalry
October 20, 2018	**No. 1 Alabama**	**58**	Tennessee	21	Knoxville, TN	Ayres Hall	Third Saturday in October
October 27, 2018	No. 9 Florida	17	**No. 7 Georgia**	**36**	Jacksonville, FL	Outside TIAA Bank Field	Rivalry
November 3, 2018	**No. 6 Georgia**	**34**	No. 9 Kentucky	17	Lexington, KY	Outside William T. Young Library	
November 10, 2018	**No. 7 LSU**	**24**	Arkansas	17	Fayetteville, AR	Outside Bud Walton Arena	Rivalry
November 17, 2018	UMass	27	**No. 5 Georgia**	**66**	Athens, GA	Outside Richard B. Russell Building	
November 24, 2018	Auburn	21	**No. 1 Alabama**	**52**	Tuscaloosa, AL	Outside Moore Hall	Iron Bowl
December 1, 2018	**No. 1 Alabama**	**35**	No. 4 Georgia	28	Atlanta, GA	Georgia World Congress Center	SEC Championship Game
December 29, 2018	No. 4 Oklahoma	34	**No. 1 Alabama**	**45**	Miami, FL	Hard Rock Stadium	Orange Bowl (CFP Semi-final)
January 1, 2019	**No. 15 Kentucky**	**27**	No. 13 Penn State	24	Orlando, FL	Camping World Stadium	Citrus Bowl
January 7, 2019	**No. 2 Clemson**	**44**	No. 1 Alabama	16	Santa Clara, CA	Levi's Stadium	CFP National Championship Game (rivalry)

=== 2019 season ===
Date	Visitor		Host		City	Location	Notes
August 24, 2019	Miami (FL)	20	**No. 8 Florida**	**24**	Orlando, FL	Camping World Stadium	Camping World Kickoff (rivalry)
August 31, 2019	**No. 3 Georgia**	**30**	Vanderbilt	6	Nashville, TN	Commons Lawn	Rivalry
September 7, 2019	West Virginia	7	**Missouri**	**38**	Columbia, MO	West Lawn of the Hearnes Center	
September 14, 2019	**No. 9 Florida**	**29**	Kentucky	21	Lexington, KY	William T. Young Library	Rivalry
September 21, 2019	**No. 8 Auburn**	**28**	No. 17 Texas A&M	20	College Station, TX	Spence Park	
September 28, 2019	Mississippi State	23	**No. 7 Auburn**	**56**	Auburn, AL	Wellness Kitchen Green Space	Rivalry
October 5, 2019	**No. 3 Georgia**	**43**	Tennessee	14	Knoxville, TN	Ayres Hall	Rivalry
October 12, 2019	**South Carolina**	**20**	No. 3 Georgia	17	Athens, GA	Myers Quad	Rivalry
October 19, 2019	**No. 2 LSU**	**36**	Mississippi State	13	Starkville, MS	The Junction	Rivalry
October 26, 2019	No. 9 Auburn	20	**No. 2 LSU**	**23**	Baton Rouge, LA	Nicholson Gateway Park	Rivalry
November 2, 2019	**No. 8 Georgia**	**24**	No. 6 Florida	17	Jacksonville, FL	Outside TIAA Bank Field	Rivalry
November 9, 2019	**No. 2 LSU**	**46**	No. 3 Alabama	41	Tuscaloosa, AL	Outside Moore Hall	Rivalry/Game of the Century
November 16, 2019	**No. 1 LSU**	**58**	Ole Miss	37	Oxford, MS	The Grove	Magnolia Bowl
November 23, 2019	Texas A&M	13	**No. 4 Georgia**	**19**	Athens, GA	Myers Quad	
November 30, 2019	No. 5 Alabama	45	**No. 15 Auburn**	**48**	Auburn, AL	Wellness Kitchen Green Space	Iron Bowl
December 7, 2019	No. 4 Georgia	10	**No. 2 LSU**	**37**	Atlanta, GA	Georgia World Congress Center	SEC Championship Game
December 28, 2019	No. 4 Oklahoma	28	**No. 1 LSU**	**63**	Atlanta, GA	Georgia World Congress Center	Peach Bowl (CFP Semi-final)
January 1, 2020	No. 14 Michigan	16	**No. 13 Alabama**	**35**	Orlando, FL	Camping World Stadium	Citrus Bowl
January 13, 2020	No. 3 Clemson	25	**No. 1 LSU**	**42**	New Orleans, LA	Mercedes-Benz Superdome	CFP National Championship Game

=== 2021 season ===
Date	Visitor		Host		City	Location	Notes
September 4, 2021	**No. 1 Alabama**	**44**	No. 14 Miami (FL)	13	Atlanta, GA	College Football Hall of Fame	Chick-fil-A Kickoff Game
September 11, 2021	No. 15 Texas	21	**Arkansas**	**40**	Fayetteville, AR	Lot 44 Outside Donald W. Reynolds Razorback Stadium	Rivalry
September 18, 2021	**No. 1 Alabama**	**31**	No. 11 Florida	29	Gainesville, FL	Plaza of the Americas	Rivalry
September 25, 2021	**Kentucky**	**16**	South Carolina	10	Columbia, SC	The Horseshoe	
October 2, 2021	No. 12 Ole Miss	21	**No. 1 Alabama**	**42**	Tuscaloosa, AL	Outside Wade Hall	Alabama–Ole Miss football rivalry
October 9, 2021	LSU	21	**No. 16 Kentucky**	**42**	Lexington, KY	William T. Young Library	
October 16, 2021	No. 11 Kentucky	13	**No. 1 Georgia**	**30**	Athens, GA	Outside Richard B. Russell Building	
October 23, 2021	LSU	17	**No. 12 Ole Miss**	**31**	Oxford, MS	The Grove	Magnolia Bowl
October 30, 2021	**No. 1 Georgia**	**34**	Florida	7	Jacksonville, FL	Outside TIAA Bank Field	Rivalry
November 6, 2021	No. 13 Auburn	3	**No. 14 Texas A&M**	**20**	College Station, TX	Across from 12th Man Statue	
November 13, 2021	**No. 1 Georgia**	**41**	Tennessee	17	Knoxville, TN	Ayres Hall	Rivalry
November 20, 2021	**No. 21 Arkansas**	35	**No. 2 Alabama**	**42**	Tuscaloosa, AL	Outside Wade Hall	
November 27, 2021	**No. 3 Alabama**	**24**	Auburn	22	Auburn, AL	Wellness Kitchen Green Space	Iron Bowl
December 4, 2021	No. 1 Georgia	24	**No. 3 Alabama**	**41**	Atlanta, GA	Georgia World Congress Center	SEC Championship Game (rivalry)
December 31, 2021	No. 4 Cincinnati	6	**No. 1 Alabama**	**27**	Arlington, TX	AT&T Stadium	Cotton Bowl Classic (CFP Semi-final)
January 10, 2022	**No. 3 Georgia**	**33**	No. 1 Alabama	18	Indianapolis, IN	Lucas Oil Stadium	CFP National Championship Game (rivalry)

=== 2022 season ===
Date	Visitor		Host		City	Location	Notes
September 3, 2022	No. 23 Cincinnati	24	**No. 19 Arkansas**	**31**	Fayetteville, AR	Old Main Lawn	
September 10, 2022	**No. 23 Wake Forest**	**45**	Vanderbilt	25	Nashville, TN	Commons Lawn	
September 17, 2022	**No. 22 Penn State**	**41**	Auburn	12	Auburn, AL	Wellness Kitchen Green Space	
September 24, 2022	No. 10 Arkansas	21	**No. 23 Texas A&M**	**23**	Arlington, TX	AT&T Stadium	Rivalry
October 1, 2022	No. 7 Kentucky	19	**No. 14 Ole Miss**	**22**	Oxford, MS	The Grove	
October 8, 2022	Arkansas	17	**No. 23 Mississippi State**	**40**	Starkville, MS	The Junction	
October 15, 2022	No. 3 Alabama	49	**No. 6 Tennessee**	**52**	Knoxville, TN	Thompson–Boling Arena East Ramp	Third Saturday in October
October 22, 2022	No. 7 Ole Miss	20	**LSU**	**45**	Baton Rouge, LA	The Quad	Magnolia Bowl
October 29, 2022	Florida	20	**No. 1 Georgia**	**42**	Jacksonville, FL	Outside TIAA Bank Field	Rivalry
November 5, 2022	No. 1 Tennessee	13	**No. 3 Georgia**	**27**	Athens, GA	Outside the Special Collections Library	Rivalry / Game of the Century
November 12, 2022	**No. 9 Alabama**	**30**	No. 11 Ole Miss	24	Oxford, MS	The Grove	Rivalry
November 19, 2022	No. 5 Tennessee	38	**South Carolina**	**63**	Columbia, SC	The Horseshoe	Rivalry
November 26, 2022	Auburn	27	**No. 8 Alabama**	**49**	Tuscaloosa, AL	Outside Wade Hall	Iron Bowl
December 3, 2022	No. 14 LSU	30	**No. 1 Georgia**	**50**	Atlanta, GA	Georgia World Congress Center	SEC Championship Game
December 31, 2022	**No. 1 Georgia**	**42**	No. 4 Ohio State	41	Atlanta, GA	Mercedes Benz Stadium	Peach Bowl
January 9, 2023	No. 3 TCU	7	**No. 1 Georgia**	**65**	Inglewood, CA	SoFi Stadium	CFP National Championship Game

=== 2023 season ===
Date	Visitor		Host		City	Location	Notes
July 18, 2023			Vanderbilt		Nashville, TN	Lower Broadway	SEC Media Days
August 31, 2023	South Dakota	10	**Missouri**	**35**	Columbia, MO	Northwest corner of Memorial Stadium	
September 2, 2023	Virginia	13	**No. 12 Tennessee**	**49**	Nashville, TN	Nissan Stadium	
September 9, 2023	**No. 11 Texas**	**34**	No. 3 Alabama	24	Tuscaloosa, AL	Outside Wade Hall	Allstate Crossbar Classic
September 16, 2023	**No. 14 LSU**	**41**	Mississippi State	14	Starkville, MS	The Junction	Rivalry
September 23, 2023	Auburn	10	**Texas A&M**	**27**	College Station, TX	Aggie Park	
September 30, 2023	No. 22 Florida	14	**Kentucky**	**33**	Lexington, KY	William T. Young Library	Rivalry
October 7, 2023	No. 20 Kentucky	13	**No. 1 Georgia**	**51**	Athens, GA	Myers Quad	
October 14, 2023	Texas A&M	13	**No. 19 Tennessee**	**20**	Knoxville, TN	Ayres Hall	
October 21, 2023	No. 17 Tennessee	20	**No. 11 Alabama**	**34**	Tuscaloosa, AL	Outside Wade Hall	Third Saturday in October
October 28, 2023	**No. 1 Georgia**	**43**	Florida	20	Jacksonville, FL	Outside EverBank Stadium	Rivalry
November 4, 2023	Texas A&M	35	**No. 10 Ole Miss**	**38**	Oxford, MS	The Grove	
November 11, 2023	**No. 8 Alabama**	**49**	Kentucky	21	Lexington, KY	William T. Young Library	
November 18, 2023	**No. 1 Georgia**	**38**	No. 18 Tennessee	10	Knoxville, TN	Ayres Hall	Rivalry
November 25, 2023	**No. 8 Alabama**	**27**	Auburn	24	Auburn, AL	Wellness Kitchen Green Space	Iron Bowl
December 2, 2023	No. 1 Georgia	24	**No. 8 Alabama**	**27**	Atlanta, GA	Georgia World Congress Center	SEC Championship (rivalry)
January 1, 2024	No. 4 Alabama	20	**No. 1 Michigan**	**27^{OT}**	Pasadena, CA	Rose Bowl	Rose Bowl

=== 2024 season ===
Date	Visitor		Host		City	Location	Notes
August 31, 2024	**No. 19 Miami (FL)**	**41**	Florida	17	Gainesville, FL	Plaza of the Americas	Rivalry
September 7, 2024	**South Carolina**	**31**	Kentucky	6	Lexington, KY	Kroger Field Orange Lot	
September 14, 2024	**Texas A&M**	**33**	Florida	20	Gainesville, FL	Plaza of the Americas	
September 21, 2024	UCLA	17	**No. 16 LSU**	**34**	Baton Rouge, LA	The Quad	
September 28, 2024	**No. 21 Oklahoma**	**27**	Auburn	21	Auburn, AL	Wellness Kitchen Green Space	
October 5, 2024	No. 9 Missouri	10	**No. 25 Texas A&M**	**41**	College Station, TX	Aggie Park	
October 12, 2024	**No. 1 Texas**	**34**	No. 18 Oklahoma	3	Dallas, TX	Texas State Fair	Red River Rivalry
October 19, 2024	No. 7 Alabama	17	**No. 11 Tennessee**	**24**	Knoxville, TN	Ayres Hall	Third Saturday in October
October 26, 2024	No. 21 Missouri	0	**No. 15 Alabama**	**34**	Tuscaloosa, AL	Outside Wade Hall	
November 2, 2024	Florida	20	**No.2 Georgia**	**34**	Jacksonville, FL	Outside EverBank Stadium	Rivalry
November 9, 2024	No. 2 Georgia	10	**No. 16 Ole Miss**	**28**	Oxford, MS	The Grove	
November 16, 2024	No. 6 Tennessee	17	**No. 11 Georgia**	**31**	Athens, GA	Outside the Special Collections Library	Rivalry
November 23, 2024	Kentucky	14	**No. 3 Texas**	**31**	Austin, TX	Hook'em Hangout	
November 30, 2024	Auburn	14	**No. 13 Alabama**	**28**	Tuscaloosa, AL	Outside Wade Hall	Iron Bowl
December 7, 2024	**No. 5 Georgia**	**22^{OT}**	No. 2 Texas	19	Atlanta, GA	Georgia World Congress Center	SEC Championship
December 21, 2024	No. 13 Clemson	24	**No. 4 Texas**	**38**	Austin, TX	Darrell K Royal–Texas Memorial Stadium	CFP First Round
January 2, 2025	**No. 3 Notre Dame**	**23**	No. 2 Georgia	10	New Orleans, LA	Caesars Superdome	Sugar Bowl – College Football Playoff Quarterfinal
January 10, 2025	**No. 6 Ohio State**	**28**	No. 4 Texas	14	Arlington, TX	Miller Lite Deck at AT&T Stadium	Cotton Bowl Classic – College Football Playoff Semifinal

=== 2025 season ===
Date	Visitor		Host		City	Location	Notes
August 30, 2025	Syracuse	26	**No. 24 Tennessee**	**45**	Atlanta, GA	Tailgate Town	Aflac Kickoff Game
September 6, 2025	Kansas	31	**Missouri**	**42**	Columbia, MO	Carnahan Quad	Border War
September 13, 2025	Florida	10	**No. 3 LSU**	**20**	Baton Rouge, LA	The Quad	Rivalry
September 20, 2025	No. 22 Auburn	17	**No. 11 Oklahoma**	**24**	Norman, OK	South Oval	
September 27, 2025	**No. 17 Alabama**	**24**	No. 5 Georgia	21	Athens, GA	Myers Quad	Rivalry
October 4, 2025	No. 9 Texas	21	**Florida**	**29**	Gainesville, FL	Plaza of the Americas	
October 11, 2025	**No. 8 Alabama**	**27**	No. 14 Missouri	24	Columbia, MO	Walsworth Plaza	
October 18, 2025	No. 11 Tennessee	20	**No. 6 Alabama**	**37**	Tuscaloosa, AL	Wade Hall	Third Saturday in October
October 25, 2025	**No. 8 Ole Miss**	**34**	No. 13 Oklahoma	26	Norman, OK	Party at the Palace	
November 1, 2025	No. 9 Vanderbilt	31	**No. 20 Texas**	**34**	Austin, TX	Gregory Gym Plaza	
November 8, 2025	**No. 5 Georgia**	**41**	Mississippi State	21	Starkville, MS	The Junction	
November 15, 2025	No. 10 Texas	10	**No. 5 Georgia**	**35**	Athens, GA	Myers Quad	
November 22, 2025	Kentucky	17	**No. 14 Vanderbilt**	**45**	Nashville, TN	Alumni Hall	Rivalry
November 29, 2025	**No. 14 Vanderbilt**	**45**	No. 19 Tennessee	24	Knoxville, TN	Ayres Hall	Rivalry
December 6, 2025	**No. 3 Georgia**	**28**	No. 10 Alabama	7	Atlanta, GA	Georgia World Congress Center	SEC Championship Game (rivalry)
December 19, 2025	**No. 11 Alabama**	**34**	No. 8 Oklahoma	24	Norman, OK	Gaylord Family Oklahoma Memorial Stadium	CFP First Round
December 20, 2025	**No. 10 Miami (FL)**	**10**	No. 7 Texas A&M	3	College Station, TX	Kyle Field	CFP First Round
January 1, 2026	**No. 6 Ole Miss**	**39**	No. 2 Georgia	34	New Orleans, LA	Caesars Superdome	Sugar Bowl – College Football Playoff Quarterfinal
January 8, 2026	**No. 10 Miami (FL)**	**31**	No. 6 Ole Miss	27	Glendale, AZ	State Farm Stadium	Fiesta Bowl – College Football Playoff Semifinal

=== 2026 season ===
Date	Visitor		Host		City	Location	Notes
September 5, 2026	Baylor	16	**Auburn**	**17**	Atlanta, GA	Tailgate Town	Aflac Kickoff Game
September 12, 2026	**No. 12 Alabama**	**45**	Kentucky	17	Lexington, KY	William T. Young Library	
September 19, 2026	**Florida**	**44**	Auburn	39	Auburn, AL	Outside Neville Arena	Rivalry
September 26, 2026	No. 4 Ole Miss	28	**No. 21 Florida**	**52**	Gainesville, FL	Plaza of the Americas	
October 3, 2026	**No. 7 Alabama**	**56**	No. 16 Mississippi State	23	Starkville, MS	The Junction	Rivalry
October 10, 2026	No. 1 Texas	24	**Oklahoma**	**27**	Dallas, TX	Texas State Fair	Red River Rivalry
October 17, 2026	No. 6 Alabama	10	**No. 14 Tennessee**	**26**	Knoxville, TN	Ayres Hall	Third Saturday in October
October 24, 2026	**No. 18 LSU**	**38**	Auburn	17	Auburn, AL	Outside Neville Arena	Rivalry
October 31, 2026	No. 17 Florida	8	**No. 3 Georgia**	**27**	Atlanta, GA	Georgia International Plaza	Rivalry
November 7, 2026	**No. 2 Georgia**	**42**	No. 12 Ole Miss	7	Oxford, MS	The Grove	
November 14, 2026	Missouri	21	**No. 1 Georgia**	**48**	Athens, GA	Myers Quad	
November 21, 2026	**No. 1 Georgia**	**34**	South Carolina	6	Columbia, SC	The Horseshoe	Rivalry

Winners are listed in bold.
Home team listed in italics for neutral-site or off-campus games.
All rankings displayed for FBS teams are from the AP Poll at the time of the game.

== Appearances and results by school ==
=== SEC ===
School	Times hosted	Host record	Host win %	Appearances	Overall Record	Overall Win %
Alabama	16	14–2	.875	62	50–12	.806
Arkansas	6	4–2	.667	11	5–6	.455
Auburn	13	5–8	.385	25	7–18	.280
Florida	10	6–4	.600	31	12–19	.387
Georgia	16	12–4	.750	53	38–15	.717
Kentucky	10	3–7	.300	20	5–15	.263
LSU	7	5–2	.714	24	15–9	.625
Mississippi State	10	4–6	.400	15	6–9	.400
Missouri	7	4–3	.571	10	4–6	.400
Oklahoma	3	1–2	.333	8	3–5	.375
Ole Miss	7	2–5	.286	14	5–9	.357
South Carolina	7	1–6	.167	12	4–8	.333
Tennessee	14	6–8	.429	29	11–18	.379
Texas	3	3–0	1.000	11	5–6	.455
Texas A&M	9	5–4	.556	17	8–9	.471
Vanderbilt	5	1–4	.200	8	2–6	.250

=== Non-SEC ===
School	Appearances	Record	Win %	Last appearance
Appalachian State	1	0–1	.000	September 1, 2016
Baylor	1	0–1	.000	September 5, 2026
Cincinnati	2	0–2	.000	September 3, 2022
The Citadel	1	1–0	1.000	November 21, 2015
Clemson	7	3–4	.429	December 21, 2024
Kansas	1	0–1	.000	September 6, 2025
Miami (FL)	5	3–2	.600	January 6, 2026
Michigan	3	2–1	.667	January 1, 2024
Michigan State	1	0–1	.000	December 31, 2015
Northwestern State	1	0–1	.000	August 30, 2018
Notre Dame	1	1–0	1.000	January 2, 2025
Ohio State	3	2–1	.667	January 10, 2025
Penn State	2	1–1	.500	September 17, 2022
South Dakota	1	0–1	.000	August 31, 2023
Syracuse	1	0–1	.000	August 30, 2025
TCU	1	0–1	.000	January 9, 2023
UCLA	2	0–2	.000	September 21, 2024
UMass	1	0–1	.000	November 17, 2018
UTEP	1	0–1	.000	September 5, 2015
Virginia	1	0–1	.000	September 2, 2023
Wake Forest	1	1–0	1.000	September 10, 2022
Washington	1	0–1	.000	December 31, 2016
West Virginia	2	1–1	.500	September 7, 2019

== Other conference records ==
Conference	Appearances	Record	Win %
ACC	13	5–8	.385
Big 12	10	2–8	.200
Big Ten	9	5–4	.556
American	2	0–2	.000
Independent	2	1–1	.500
Pac-12	2	0–2	.000
Conference USA	1	0–1	.000
Missouri Valley	1	0–1	.000
Southern	1	1–0	1.000
Southland	1	0–1	.000
Sun Belt	1	0–1	.000

== Off campus locations ==
=== Regular season ===
- Nissan Stadium (previously LP Field), Nashville, TN
  - 2014 home game for Vanderbilt vs. No. 15 Ole Miss
  - 2023 home game for No. 12 Tennessee vs. Virginia
- EverBank Stadium (previously Everbank Field & TIAA Bank Field), Jacksonville, FL
  - 2016 Florida–Georgia football rivalry game
  - 2017 Florida–Georgia football rivalry game
  - 2018 Florida–Georgia football rivalry game
  - 2019 Florida–Georgia football rivalry game
  - 2021 Florida–Georgia football rivalry game
  - 2022 Florida–Georgia football rivalry game
  - 2023 Florida–Georgia football rivalry game
  - 2024 Florida–Georgia football rivalry game
- AT&T Stadium, Arlington, Texas
  - 2017 Advocare Classic: No. 17 Florida vs. No. 11 Michigan
  - 2022 Arkansas–Texas A&M football rivalry game
- Bank of America Stadium, Charlotte, North Carolina
  - 2018 Belk Kickoff Game; No. 17 West Virginia vs. Tennessee
- Camping World Stadium, Orlando, Florida
  - 2019 Camping World Kickoff; Miami (FL) vs. No. 8 Florida
- Mercedes Benz Stadium, Atlanta, Georgia
  - 2021 Chick-fil-A Kickoff Game; No. 1 Alabama vs. No. 14 Miami
  - 2025 Aflac Kickoff Game; Syracuse vs. No. 24 Tennessee
  - 2026 Aflac Kickoff Game; Baylor vs. Auburn
  - 2026 Florida–Georgia football rivalry game
- Cotton Bowl
  - 2024 Red River Rivalry game
  - 2026 Red River Rivalry game

=== Postseason ===
- Georgia Dome, Georgia World Congress Center, Atlanta, GA
  - 2014 SEC Championship Game
  - 2015 SEC Championship Game
  - 2016 SEC Championship Game
  - 2016 Peach Bowl – CFP Semifinal Game
- Caesars Superdome (previously Mercedes-Benz Superdome), New Orleans, LA
  - 2015 Sugar Bowl – CFP Semifinal Game
  - 2018 Sugar Bowl – CFP Semifinal Game
  - 2020 CFP National Championship Game
  - 2025 Sugar Bowl – CFP Quarterfinal Game
  - 2026 Sugar Bowl – CFP Quarterfinal Game
- AT&T Stadium, Arlington, Texas
  - 2015 Cotton Bowl Classic – CFP Semifinal Game
  - 2021 Cotton Bowl Classic – CFP Semifinal Game
  - 2025 Cotton Bowl Classic – CFP Semifinal Game
- Rose Bowl, Pasadena, California
  - 2024 Rose Bowl – CFP Semifinal Game
- University of Phoenix Stadium, Glendale, Arizona
  - 2016 CFP National Championship Game
- Raymond James Stadium, Tampa, Florida
  - 2017 CFP National Championship Game
- Mercedes-Benz Stadium, Georgia World Congress Center, Atlanta, GA
  - 2017 SEC Championship Game
  - 2018 CFP National Championship Game
  - 2018 SEC Championship Game
  - 2019 SEC Championship Game
  - 2019 Peach Bowl – CFP Semifinal Game
  - 2021 SEC Championship Game
  - 2022 SEC Championship Game
  - 2022 Peach Bowl – CFP Semifinal Game
  - 2023 SEC Championship Game
  - 2024 SEC Championship Game
  - 2025 SEC Championship Game
- Hard Rock Stadium, Miami, Florida
  - 2018 Orange Bowl – CFP Semifinal Game
- Levi's Stadium, Santa Clara, California
  - 2019 CFP National Championship Game
- Camping World Stadium, Orlando, Florida
  - 2019 Citrus Bowl
  - 2020 Citrus Bowl
- Lucas Oil Stadium, Indianapolis, Indiana
  - 2022 CFP National Championship Game
- SoFi Stadium, Inglewood, California
  - 2023 CFP National Championship Game
- Darrell K Royal - Texas Memorial Stadium, Austin, Texas
  - 2025 CFP First Round Game
- Gaylord Family Oklahoma Memorial Stadium, Norman, Oklahoma
  - 2026 CFP First Round Game
- Kyle Field, College Station Texas
  - 2026 CFP First Round Game
- State Farm Stadium
  - 2026 Fiesta Bowl – CFP Semifinal Game

== Tebow's Freak of the Week ==
=== 2014 ===
Date	Player	Team
August 28	Corey Robinson	South Carolina
August 30	Sammie Coates	Auburn
September 6	Vince Taylor	Vanderbilt
September 13	Vernon Hargreaves III	Florida
September 20	Landon Collins	Alabama
September 27	Nick Chubb	Georgia
October 4	Benardrick McKinney	Mississippi State
October 11	Trey Flowers	Arkansas
October 18	Robert Nkemdiche	Ole Miss
October 25	Alvin Bud Dupree	Kentucky
November 1	Shane Ray	Missouri
November 8	Danielle Hunter	LSU
November 15	Myles Garrett	Texas A&M
November 22	Owen Williams	Tennessee
November 29	Nick Chubb	Georgia
Freak of the Year	Trey Flowers & Nick Chubb	Arkansas & Georgia

=== 2015 ===
Date	Player	Team
September 5	Dan Skipper	Arkansas
September 12	Sony Michel	Georgia
September 19	Leonard Fournette	LSU
September 26	Jonathan Bullard	Florida
October 3	Nick Chubb	Georgia
October 10	Cameron Sutton	Tennessee
October 17	Myles Garrett	Texas A&M
October 24	Derrick Henry	Alabama
October 31	Stanley Williams	Kentucky
November 5	Charles Harris	Missouri
November 7	Robert Nkemdiche	Ole Miss
November 14	Brandon Bryant	Mississippi State
November 21	Pharoh Cooper	South Carolina
November 28	Carl Lawson	Auburn
Freak of the Year	Derrick Henry	Alabama

=== 2016 ===
Date	Player	Team
September 3	Myles Garrett	Texas A&M
September 10	Gerri Green	Mississippi State
September 17	D.J. Jones	Ole Miss
September 24	Braden Smith	Auburn
October 1	Isaiah McKenzie	Georgia
October 8	N/A	N/A
October 15	Alvin Kamara	Tennessee
October 22	Jordan Jones	Kentucky
October 29	N/A	N/A
November 5	Jeremiah Ledbetter	Arkansas
November 12	Florida Secondary	Florida
November 19	Derrius Guice	LSU
November 26	O. J. Howard	Alabama
Freak of the Year	Jordan Jones & Myles Garrett	Kentucky & Texas A&M

October 8: There was no Freak of the Week due to SEC Nation not being at a specific location because of Hurricane Matthew moving SEC Nation to their Charlotte studios. The Freak of the Week would have been someone from Florida or LSU. October 29: There was no Freak of the Week due to the game being at a neutral site with no exact team location. Instead, in the spirit of Halloween, Tebow and Spears "created" their own scariest player based on how good different players were from the SEC.

=== 2017 ===
Date	Player	Team
September 2	Chauncey Gardner Jr	Florida
September 9	Damarea Crockett	Missouri
September 16	Donald Gray	Mississippi State
September 23	Ralph Webb	Vanderbilt
September 30	Trevor Daniel	Tennessee
October 7	Kadarius Toney	Florida
October 14	Lorenzo Carter	Georgia
October 21	Calvin Ridley	Alabama
October 28	N/A	N/A
November 4	Bo Scarbrough	Alabama
November 11	Will Hastings	Auburn
November 18	Christian Payne	Georgia
November 25	Hayden Hurst	South Carolina
December 2	Lorenzo Carter	Georgia
Freak of the Year	Lorenzo Carter & Hayden Hurst	Georgia & South Carolina

October 28: There was no Freak of the Week due to the game being at a neutral site with no exact team location. Instead, in the spirit of Halloween, Tebow and Spears "created" their own scariest player based on how good different players were from the SEC.

=== 2018 ===
Date	Player	Team
August 30	Tyrel Dodson	Texas A&M
September 7	Deebo Samuel	South Carolina
September 14	DK Metcalf	Ole Miss
September 21	Xavier McKinney	Alabama
September 28	Montez Sweat	Mississippi State
October 6	Jordan Scarlett	Florida
October 13	Derrick Brown	Auburn
October 20	Alontae Taylor	Tennessee
October 27	N/A	N/A
November 3	Josh Allen	Kentucky
November 10	Hjalte Froholdt	Arkansas
November 17	Elijah Holyfield and D'Andre Swift	Georgia
Freak of the Year	Quinnen Williams	Alabama

October 27: This week there were two throwback Freaks of the Week, for Georgia, Herschel Walker and for Florida, Jevon Kearse.

=== 2019 ===
Date	Player	Team
August 24	CJ Henderson	Florida
August 31	Jared Pinkney	Vanderbilt
September 7	Albert Okwuegbunam	Missouri
September 14	Josh Paschal	Kentucky
September 21	Micheal Clemons	Texas A&M
September 28	Derrick Brown and Anthony Schwartz	Auburn
October 5	Trey Smith	Tennessee
October 12	D'Andre Swift	Georgia
October 19	Kylin Hill	Mississippi State
October 26	Grant Delpit	LSU
November 2	Van Jefferson and Lawrence Cager	Florida and Georgia
November 9	Bama wideouts	Alabama
November 16	Myles Hartsfield	Ole Miss
November 23	Azeez Ojulari	Georgia
November 30	Marlon Davidson	Auburn
December 7	Clyde Edwards-Helaire	LSU
December 28	JaCoby Stevens	LSU
January 13	K'Lavon Chaisson	LSU
Freak of the Year	Derrick Brown	Auburn
