= Plaza of the Americas =

Plaza of the Americas may refer to:

- Plaza of the Americas (Gainesville, Florida), University of Florida campus
- Plaza of the Americas (Dallas), building complex in the City Center District, Dallas, Texas

== See also ==
- Plaza de las Américas (disambiguation)
