= Ehecatl =

Aztec wind deity

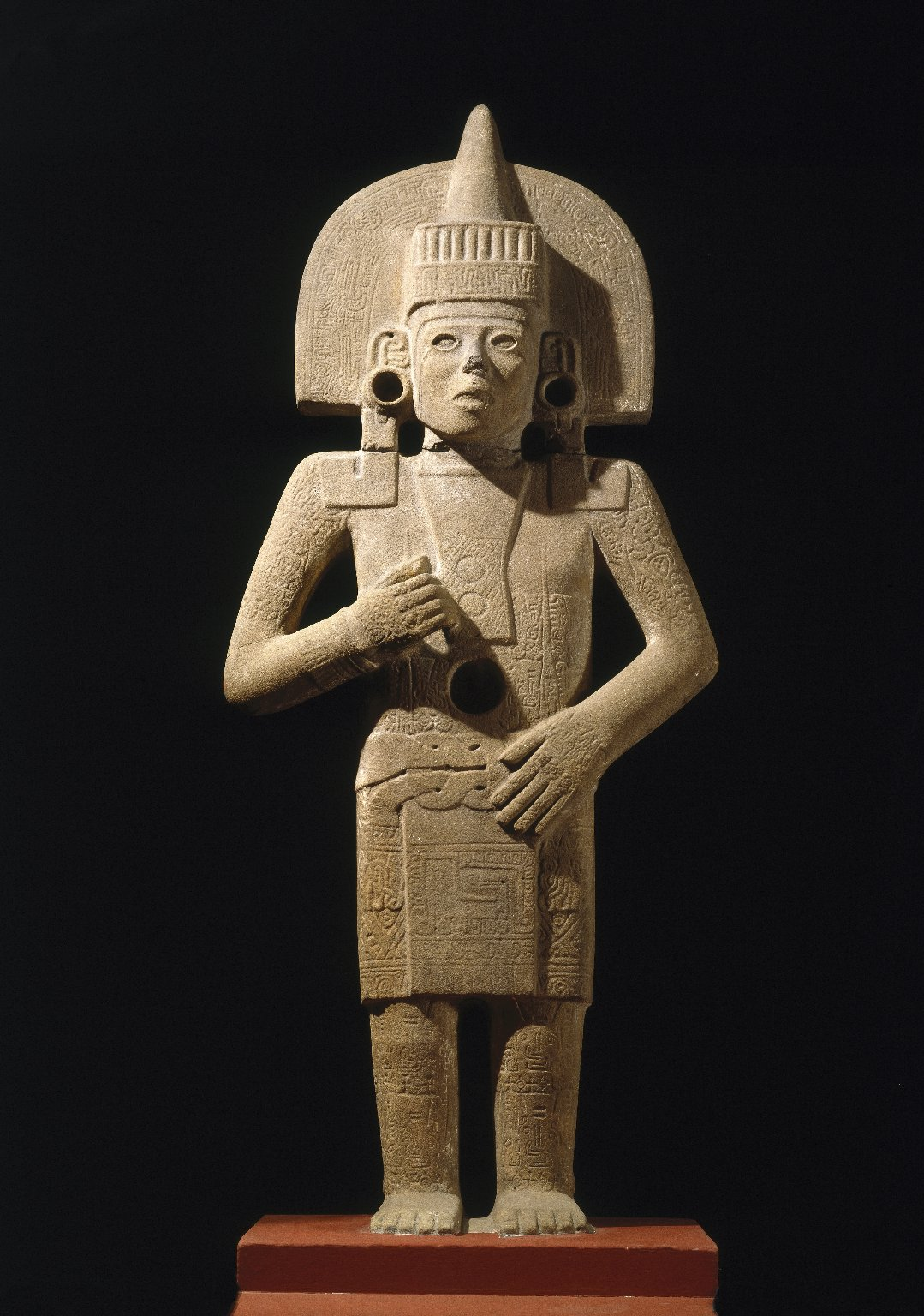
Statue of Ehecatl-Quetzalcoatl, in the Brooklyn Museum (New York City)

Ehecatl (Classical Nahuatl: Ehēcatl [eˈʔeːkatɬ], modern Nahuatl pronunciation, Otomi: Edähï) is a pre-Columbian deity associated with the wind, who features in Aztec mythology and the mythologies of other cultures from the central Mexico region of Mesoamerica. He is most usually interpreted as the aspect of the Feathered Serpent deity (Quetzalcoatl in Aztec and other Nahua cultures) as a god of wind, and is therefore also known as Ehecatl-Quetzalcoatl. Ehecatl also figures prominently as one of the creator gods and culture heroes in the mythical creation accounts documented for pre-Columbian central Mexican cultures.

Since the wind blows in all directions, Ehecatl was associated with all the cardinal directions. His temple was built as a cylinder in order to reduce the air resistance, and was sometimes portrayed with two protruding masks through which the wind blew. It was at this temple that the Aztec death whistle was discovered, though current interpretations of their ritual use are disputed.

== Contemporary depictions ==
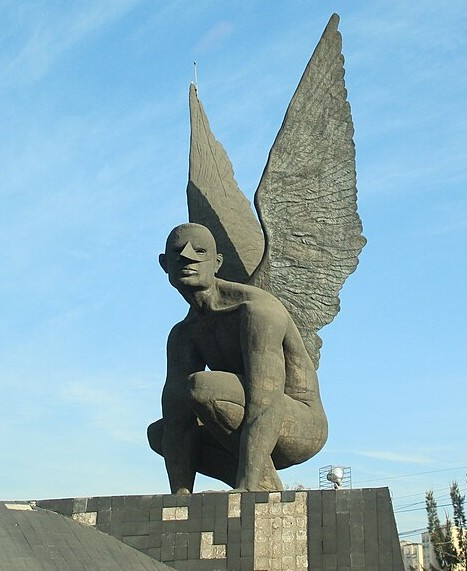
El Vigilante by Jorge Marín, in Ecatepec, state of Mexico
