= Plaza de las Américas =

Plaza de las Américas may refer to:

- Plaza Las Américas (Puerto Rico), shopping mall in Hato Rey, Puerto Rico
- Plaza Las Américas (Cancún), shopping mall in Cancún, Quintana Roo, Mexico
- Plaza de las Américas Juan Pablo II, in Zapopan, Jalisco, Mexico

== See also ==
- Plaza of the Americas (disambiguation)
