= El Vigilante (sculpture) =

Sculpture by Jorge Marín in Mexico

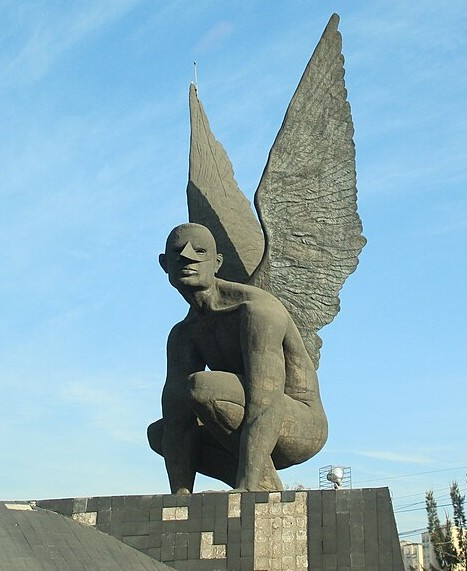
- The monument in 2025
- Location
- Artist: Jorge Marín
- Year: 2016
- Medium: Bronze
- Dimensions: 31 m × 15 m × 15 m (102 ft × 49 ft × 49 ft)
- Weight: 25 t (25 long tons; 28 short tons)
- Location: Ecatepec de Morelos; 19.52287°N 99.08987°W
- Website: jorgemarin.com.mx

El Vigilante (lit. transl. The Vigilant) is an outdoor cire perdue bronze sculpture installed along Mexican Federal Highway 85D ("México–Pachuca" Highway), in the limits of Ecatepec de Morelos and Tlalnepantla de Baz, in the State of Mexico.

== Description and history ==
The sculpture was designed by Jorge Marín and it was inaugurated on 18 March 2016 by Enrique Peña Nieto, the president of Mexico from 2012 to 2018 during the inauguration of the adjacent vehicular bridge. It is a 25 meters (82 ft) high artwork that features a crouched angel placed on a 6 meters (20 ft) high concrete plinth. Even though its basement also functions as an observation deck, as of January 2020 there were no bridges or access roads that directly connect to it. The sculpture weighs 25 metric tons (25 long tons; 28 short tons).

Marín said he designed the sculpture in a contemporary manner, featuring a young man with tattoos and piercings that wears a bird mask to represent Ehecatl, a deity associated with the wind. Marín recommended looking at it in a quick and distant way. The sculpture cost over seven million Mexican pesos.

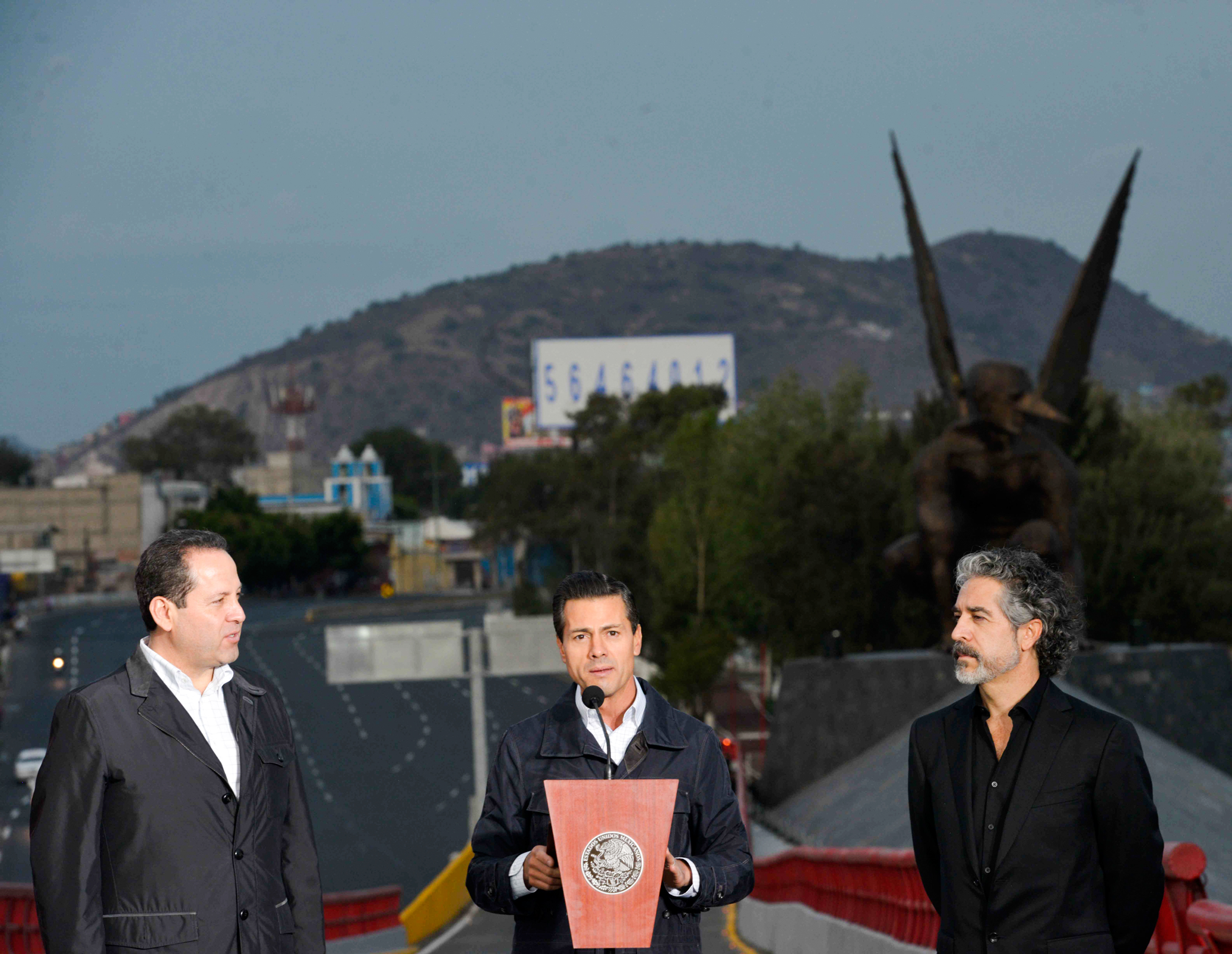
Enrique Peña Nieto (center), Jorge Marín (right) and Eruviel Ávila (left) during the inauguration

== See also ==
- El Ángel de la Seguridad Social, a similar sculpture by Marín
