= Javier Marín =

Mexican sculptor (born 1962)

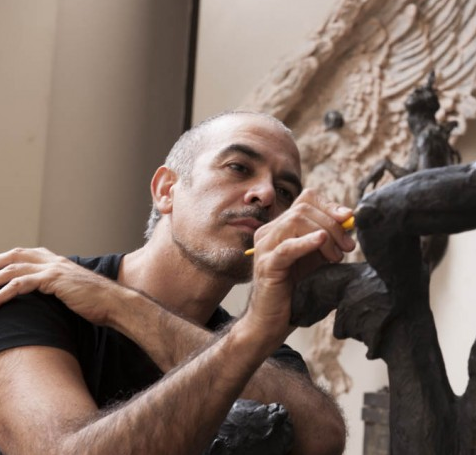
- Born: 1962 (age 63–64); Uruapan, Michoacán, Mexico
- Known for: Visual artist
- Relatives: Jorge Marín (brother)

Javier Marín (born 1962) is a Mexican contemporary sculptor, known for his large-scale sculptures focusing on the human form. He has exhibited extensively for the last 30 years, and his work can be found in major metropolitan museums. In 2013, he started the Javier Marin Foundation to support emerging artists.

== Biography ==
Javier Marín (Victor Javier Marín Gutiérrez) was born in 1962 in Uruapan, Michoacán. He grew up in a large family with ten siblings, and a father who worked as an architect. Marin graduated from Academy of San Carlos and the National Autonomous University of Mexico. Influenced by artist and professor, Gerda Gruber, to work in clay as well via bringing him into the inner circle and further encouraging him to pursue clay. He lives and works in Mexico City.

== Career ==
=== Sculpting ===
In his early works, Marin's utilized clay from traditional, pre-colonial sources, including Oaxaca and Pátzcuaro. In addition to using indigenous materials, he worked with early sculpting methods such as lox-wax casting. He does not use models for reference, thus, his works are created from his imagination. Marin is known to intentionally leave marks on his sculptures with his fingers or palette knife, as opposed to smoothing them over. A distinguishing feature of his work is that they lack proportion and exaggerate features such as the lips. Due the lack of perfectionism, his images are meant to focus on the more gritty side of the human condition. His vague titles are intentional, so that viewers may find interpret the sculptures themselves. Marin believes that it is important to keep diversity in the facial features, since his goal is to convey humanity as a whole and not one specific individual. His sculptures are colored with clay and water to help give them a more naturalistic, earthy texture.

=== Fiber works ===
In collaboration with Odabashion Marin created two rugs and 7 tapestries. The tapestries are made with a Gobelin style technique while the rugs are woven in a traditional Tibetan knot. All works displayed in Mexico City, 5–9, 2020

Like his sculptures, his fiber works are about the process more than the final work. His tapestries explore the deconstruction and reconstruction of material. The tapestries, are composed of images made from molds containing traits from the entire process of creating the mold such as a shoeprint left by the worker during the making process.

Battle Rug, one of two rugs, is meant to depict a fight scene, was made by cutting out characters and throwing them around randomly.

=== Javier Marin Foundation ===
Founded in 2013, the Javier Marin Foundation is a non-profit that aims to support new and emerging artists. Plantel Matilde, a large scale building and inhabitable sculpture located in the Yucatan, is part of the Foundation and is a residential artist's colony. The residential building features fountains, pools, and patios inspired by churches as well of sculptures made by Javier Marin.

== Select artworks ==
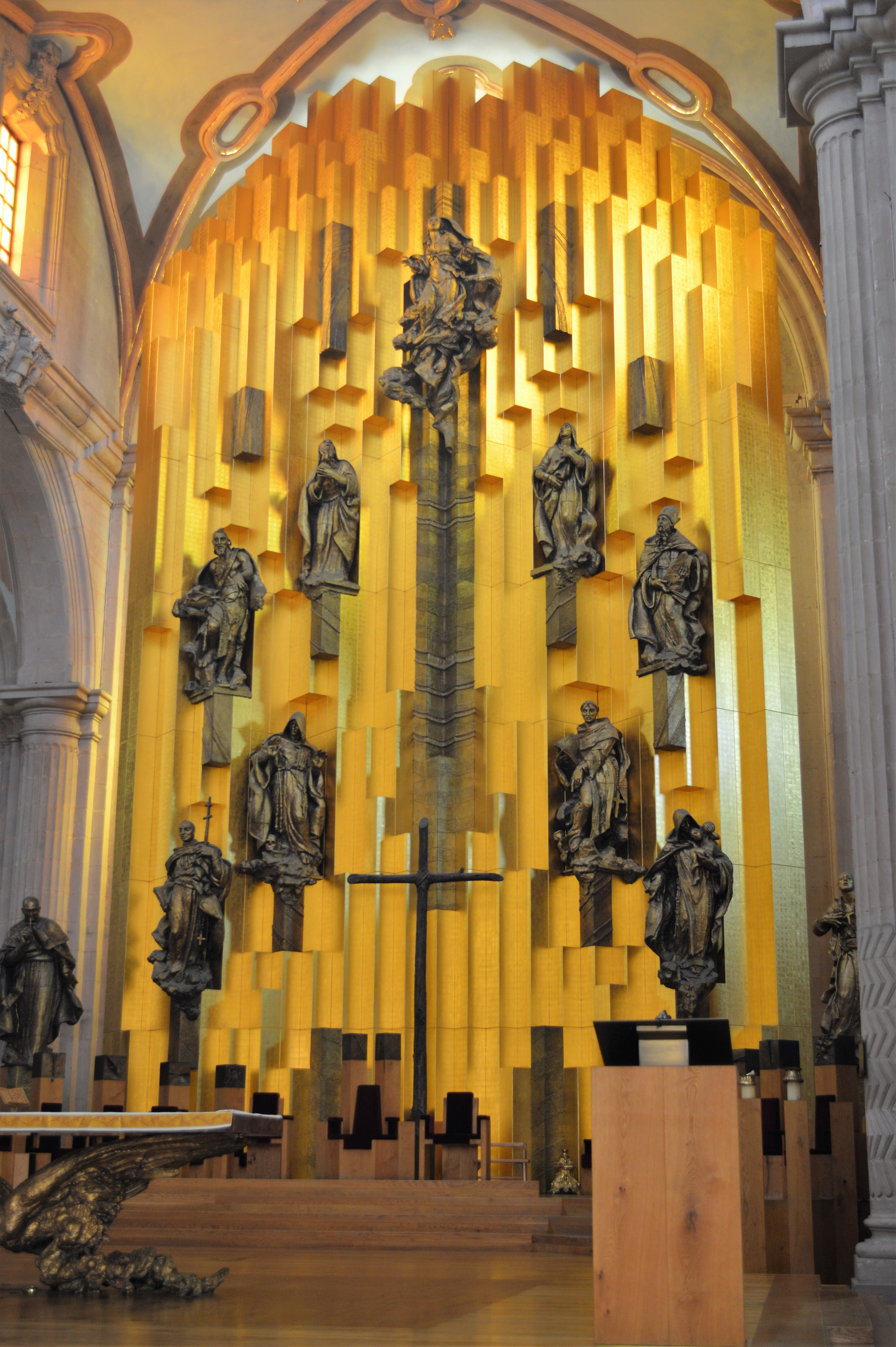
Retablo for the Zacatecas Cathedral

=== Cathedral of Zacatecas ===
A collaboration with Ricardo Leogorreta in which the two won a contest for a redesign proposal for the interior of Zacatecas. Made with Bronze, wood and gold leaf, the piece has 12 choir chairs and the 12 apostles depicted in a prismatic orientation. This piece is seen as one of his more noteworthy works.

=== Chalchihuites ===
Appeared in the National Museum of Korea showing off Marin's interpretation Pre-Hispanic Mexican symbols. Sculptures were cut up with wire and attached to a stone that represents circular continuity. The piece is seen as a representation of pre-Columbian history and the type of rituals they performed.

=== Untitled 1,2 & 6 ===
Pieces were broken rearranged and put back together with iron wire. The intent was to allow viewers to see what materials were used and how they're used.

=== Little Women, Little Men ===
24 figures made from polyester resin, varying in colors and mounted on the side of the wall. No larger than three feet. Made with polyester resin and lost wax bronze containing Marin's marked signature of leaving marks and prints in his work so the viewer can almost see the process behind how it was made.

== Selected exhibitions ==
=== Solo exhibitions ===
- 1993 – The body snatched: the skin of clay, Museo de Arte Contemporáneo (MARCO)
- 2009 – Seven heads and three wigs, Nohra Haime Gallery
- 2012 – Javier Marín, Sculpture, China Art Museum
- 2017 – Cabeza Vainilla
- 2018 & 2019 - Javier Marín San Diego Museum of Art, San Diego Museum of Art
- 2023 & 2024 – Javier Marín Tres Cabezas, Cabezas

=== Group exhibitions ===
- 1990 & 1991 – The Classic in Mexico. Centro Cultural Arte Contemporaneo, Mexico City, Mexico
- 2015 – Motor de Impulso, Terreno Baldio Arte, Mexico City, Mexico
- 2020 – Terreno Baldío Programa de Foto. Terreno Baldío Arte, Mexico City, Mexico

=== Permanent ===
- 2009 – "Hoy es hoy" head, Jacksonville Airport
- 2010 – Retablo, Altarpiece of the Cathedral Basilica of Zacatecas
- 2012 – Installation "De 3 en 3 (Caballos rojos I, II y III )", Santa Fe

== Awards ==
- First Prize at the Third International Beijing Biennale (2008)
- Knight of the Order of Orange-Nassau by the Queen of Netherlands (2009)
