= Brown Ayres =

American academic administrator (1856–1919)

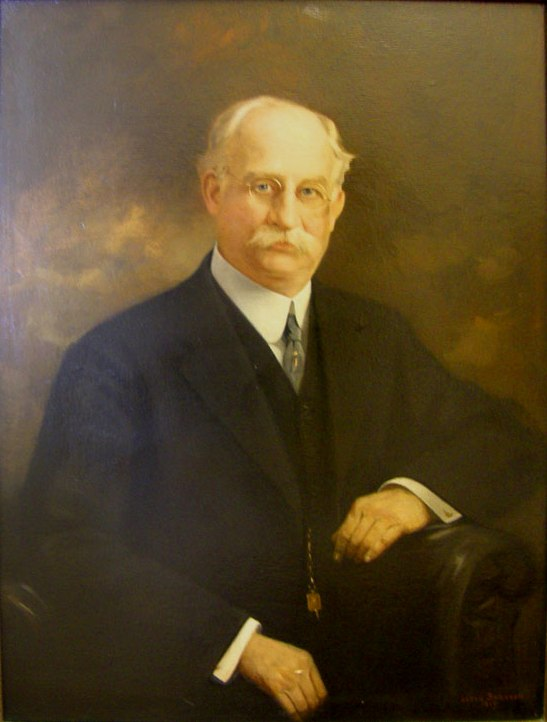
- Born: May 25, 1856; Memphis, Tennessee, US
- Died: January 28, 1919 (aged 62); Knoxville, Tennessee, US
- Education: Washington and Lee University Stevens Institute of Technology Johns Hopkins University
- Occupation(s): University president and professor
- Employers: Tulane University; University of Tennessee

Brown Ayres (May 25, 1856 – January 28, 1919) was an American educator and academic administrator. He was the president of the University of Tennessee and the acting president, dean, and physics professor of Tulane University.

== Early life ==
Brown Ayres was born in Memphis, Tennessee, on May 24, 1856. His parents were Elizabeth Little (née Cook) and Samuel Warren Ayrers, a lawyer. His family moved to New Orleans, Louisiana, when he was a child.

He enrolled in an engineering course at Washington and Lee University when he was fifteen years old. While there, he was a member of the Fraternity of Delta Psi (St. Anthony Hall). He also founded and was the publisher of a tri-weekly newspaper, The Evening Review, covering Rockbridge, Bath, and Montgomery, Virginia. In 1871, he erected a telegraph line in Lexington, Virginia, and taught other students how to use the equipment; his descendants subsequently claimed that his motive for doing so was a desire to communicate more easily with his girlfriend.

He transferred to the Stevens Institute of Technology, graduating with a BS engineering in 1878. He was a member of Phi Beta Kappa and Phi Kappa Phi.

Ayres received a fellowship in physics at Johns Hopkins University from 1879 to 1880. His studies focused on electricity and experimentation with the newly patented telephone, leading to meeting Alexander Graham Bell and Thomas Edison. In 1878, he helped Bell demonstrate the telephone in New York City.

Ayres was offered a position with Bell's new telephone company but he turned it down to pursue a career in academia. He received a Ph.D. in physics from the Stevens Institute in 1888.

== Career ==
Ayres started his academic career as a professor of physics and electrical engineering at the University of Louisiana in New Orleans in 1880; the college became Tulane University in 1884. In 1894, Ayres became the dean of Tulane's College of Technology, followed by vice chairman of faculty and dean of the Academic College in 1900.

Throughout his career at Tulane, he followed his interest in electricity. He corresponded with Edison, securing lightbulbs that he used for public demonstrations in New Orleans. He also gave lectures about the benefits of streetcars, guiding the city to install street cars between his home and work. Ayres served on the Jury of Electricity for the World's Columbian Exposition in 1893, the Cotton States and International Exposition in 1895, and the Tennessee Centennial and International Exposition in 1897. He experimented with phonograph recordings and in 1896 was the first person in New Orleans to create an X-ray image.

Ayres correctly predicted the arrival of a comet and received national acclaim for his photographs of a solar eclipse in 1900. In July 1902, he lectured on theoretical physics demonstrated wireless telegraphy (radio) for thousands of educators at the Summer School of the South held at the University of Tennessee. He was a lecturer and planned an exhibit on "Education in the South" for the Louisiana Purchase Exposition in 1904.

In 1904, Ayres became the acting president of Tulane University. Later that year, he became the 12th president of the University of Tennessee, remaining in that position until he died in 1919. Ayres administration at the university focused on fundraising and politics. Under his leadership, the university received its first million-dollar appropriation from the Tennessee General Assembly in 1917. This led to improvements in the university's academic standing, admission standards, and increases in enrollment. He also oversaw the establishment of the university's medical school and the division of the business and liberal arts colleges.

Ayres was a fellow of the American Association for the Advancement of Science. He served as the president of the Association of Colleges and Preparatory Schools of the Southern States and president of the National Association of State Universities. He was also vice president of the Association of Public and Land-grant Universities. He was a member of the American Institute of Electrical Engineers, the American Physical Society, and the Association for the Promotion of Engineering Education.

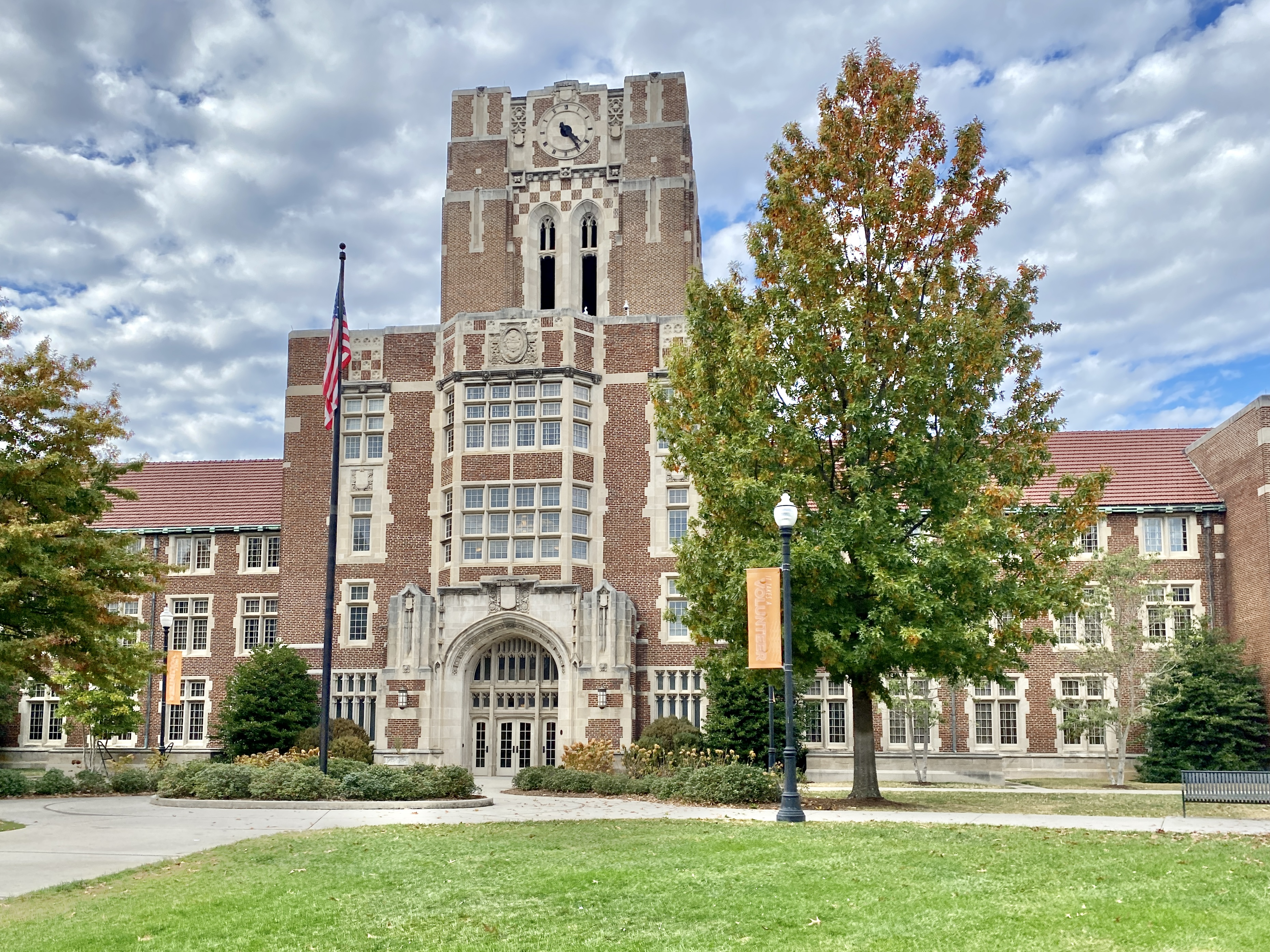
Ayres Hall, University of Tennessee

== Honors ==
Ayres received honorary LLD degrees from South Carolina College, the Stevens Institute of Technology, Tulane University, the University of Alabama, the University of the South, and Washington and Lee University.

Ayres Hall at the University of Tennessee was named in his honor; however, for several years, it was named "Ayers Hall".

== Personal life ==
Ayres married Kate Allen Anderson of Lexington, Virginia, on July 5, 1881. The couple had three sons and five daughters. The family lived on St. Charles Avenue, in the Garden District of New Orleans. Their home was a gathering place for literary people who visited the city.

Ayers was the host and director of the New Orleans Choral Symphony Society. He was also a popular public speaker, known for his magic lantern shows. He was also involved with the New Orleans Electric Society and was a president of the Louisiana Society of Naturalists. He headed a building campaign and helped establish the Louisiana Industrial Institute, now the University of Louisiana at Lafayette.

Ayres died in Knoxville, Tennessee, at the age of 62 years. He was buried at Greenwood Cemetery in Knoxville.
