= El Ángel de la Seguridad Social =

Sculpture in Mexico City, Mexico

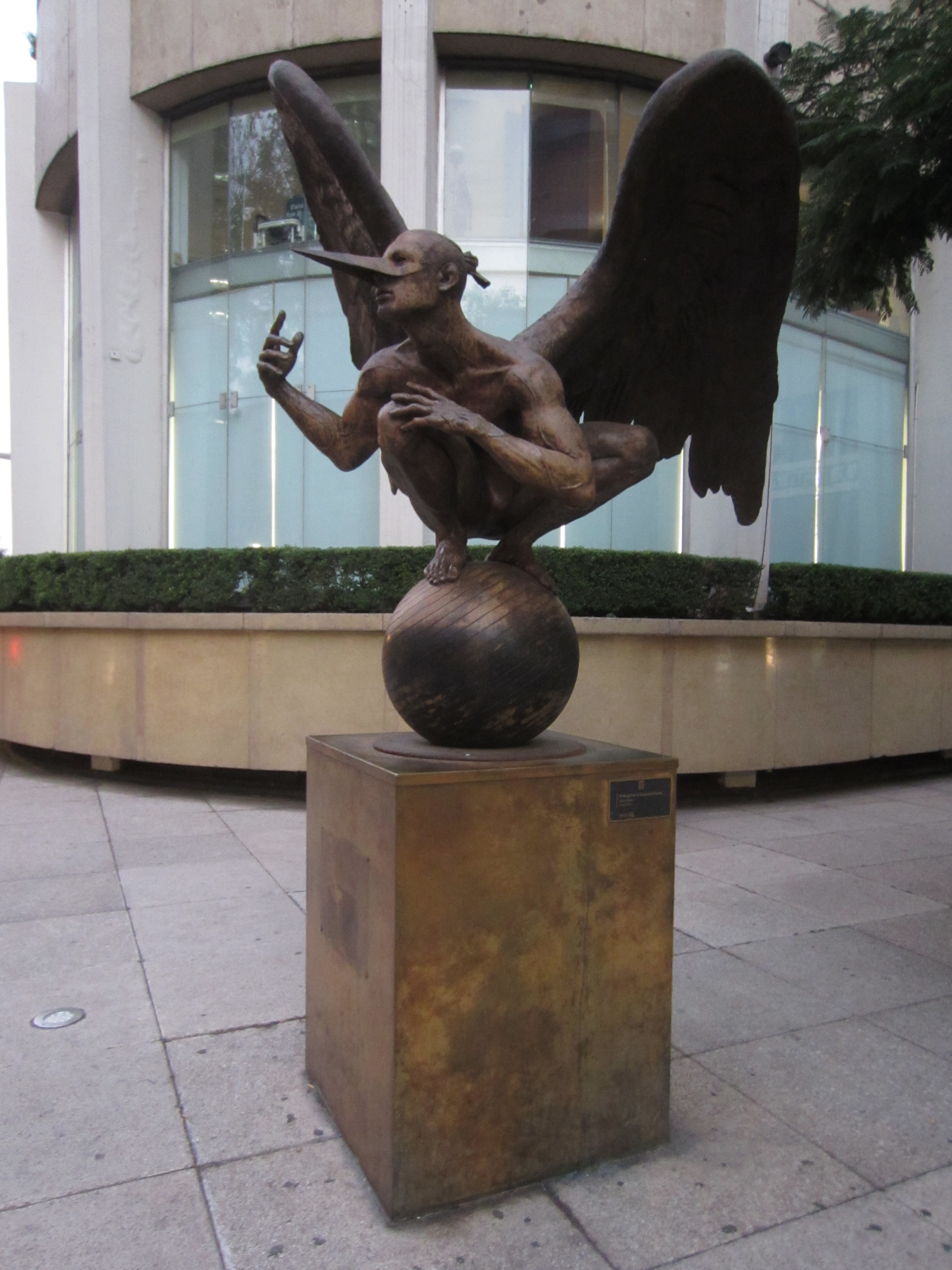
- The statue in 2018
- Location in Mexico City
- Artist: Jorge Marín
- Medium: Bronze sculpture
- Location: Mexico City, Mexico
- 19.4233947°N 99.1738657°W

El Ángel de la Seguridad Social (or The Social Security Angel) is an outdoor 2013 bronze sculpture by Jorge Marín, installed along Mexico City's Paseo de la Reforma, in Mexico. It commemorates the creation of the Mexican Social Security Institute.

== See also ==
- 2013 in art
- El Vigilante, a similar sculpture by Marín
