= Cabeza Vainilla =

Sculpture by Javier Marín

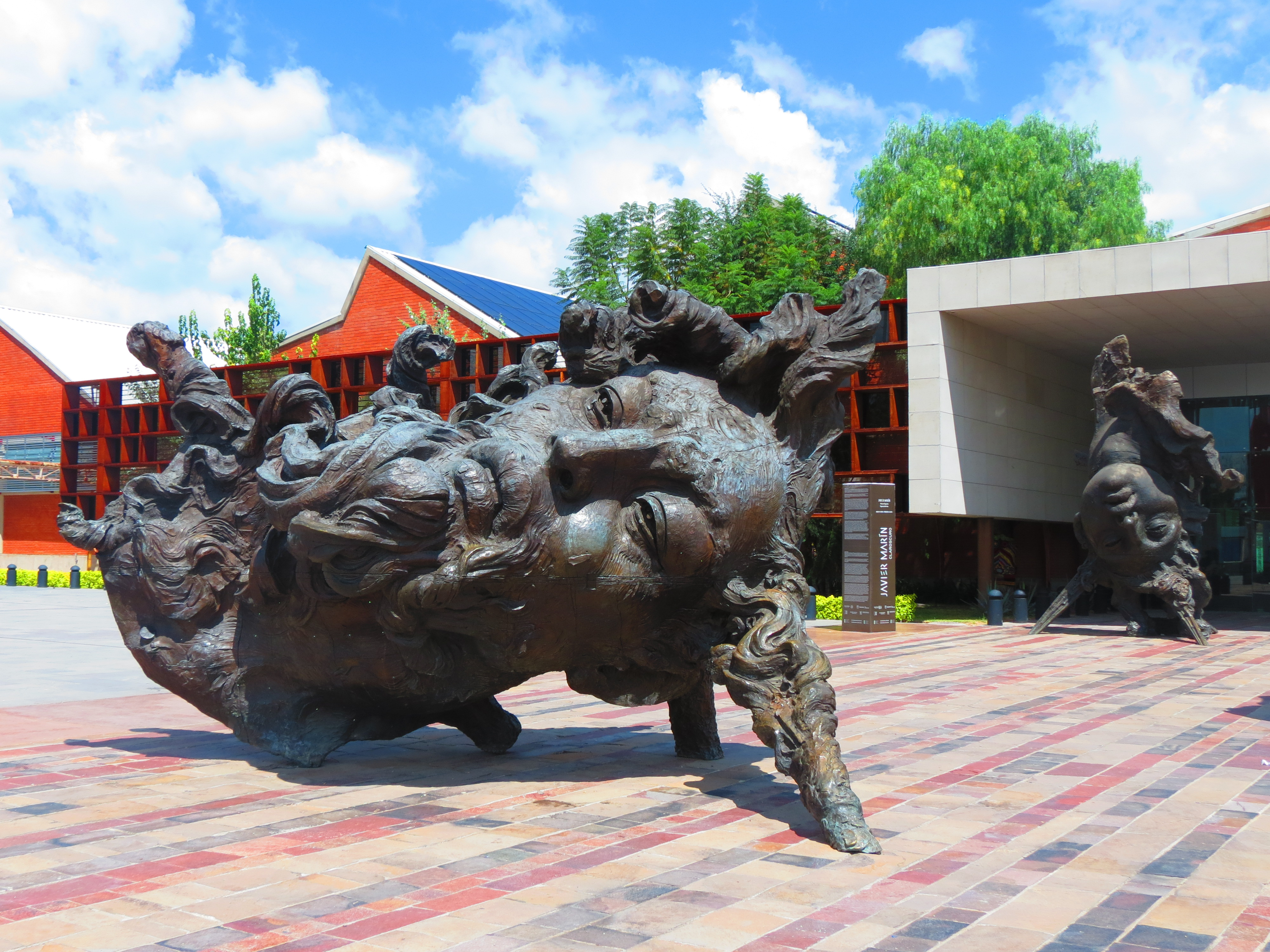
- Cabeza Vainilla (in front) in Museo Espacio, Aguascalientes City, in 2015
- Artist: Javier Marín
- Year: 2008
- Location: Zapopan, Jalisco, Mexico
- 20°43′15″N 103°23′26″W

Cabeza Vainilla is one of three sculptures by Javier Marín. The statues are commonly installed in museums and squares. The whole set features giant heads. As of 2021, Cabeza Vainilla is installed in Zapopan's Plaza de las Américas Juan Pablo II, in the Mexican state of Jalisco.
