= The Grove (Ole Miss) =

Part of the University of Mississippi campus

Coordinates: 34°21′56.63″N 89°31′57.59″W

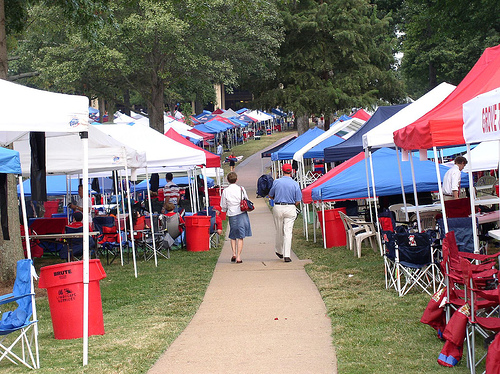
A sea of red and blue tents takes over The Grove on football game day.

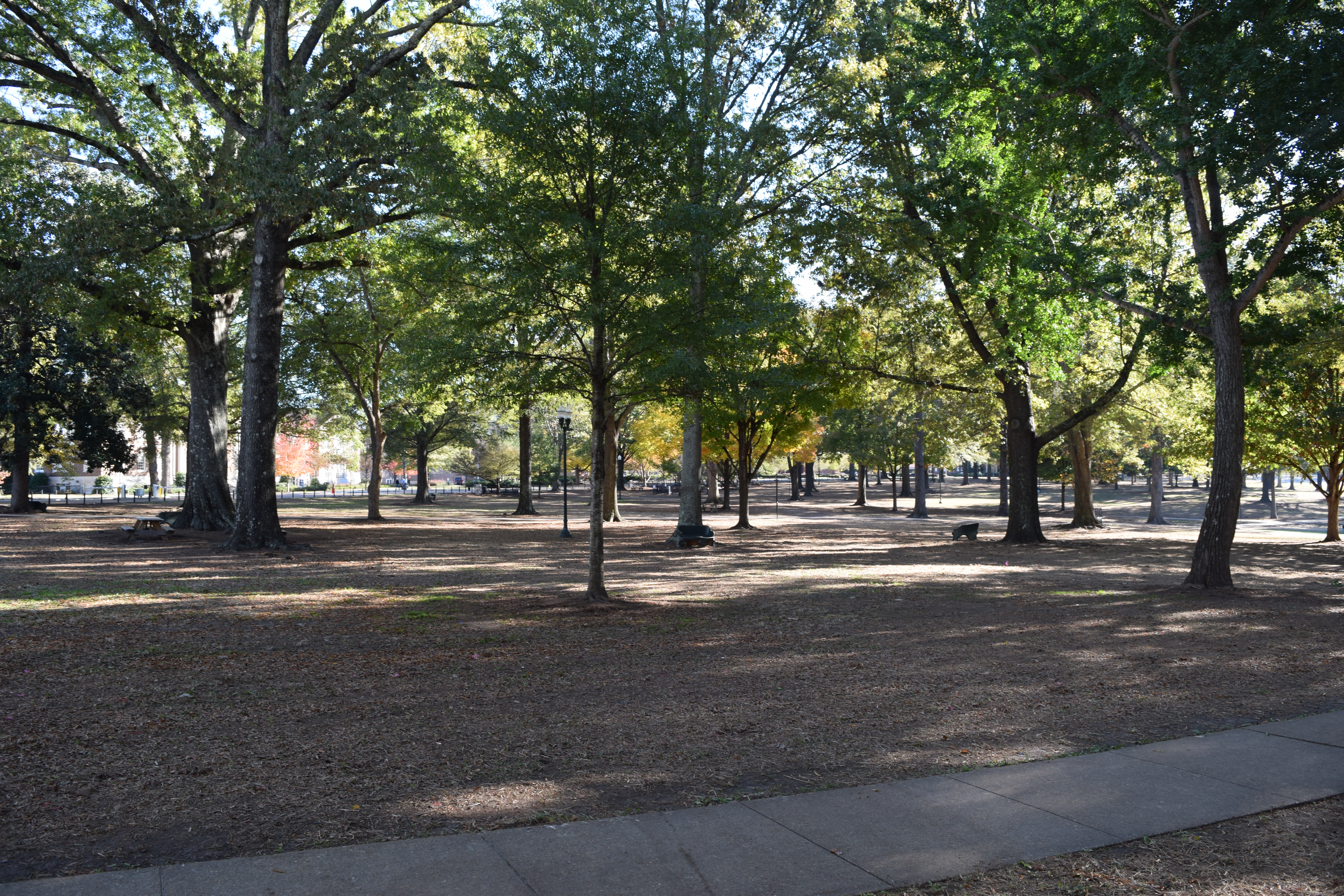
The Grove in fall

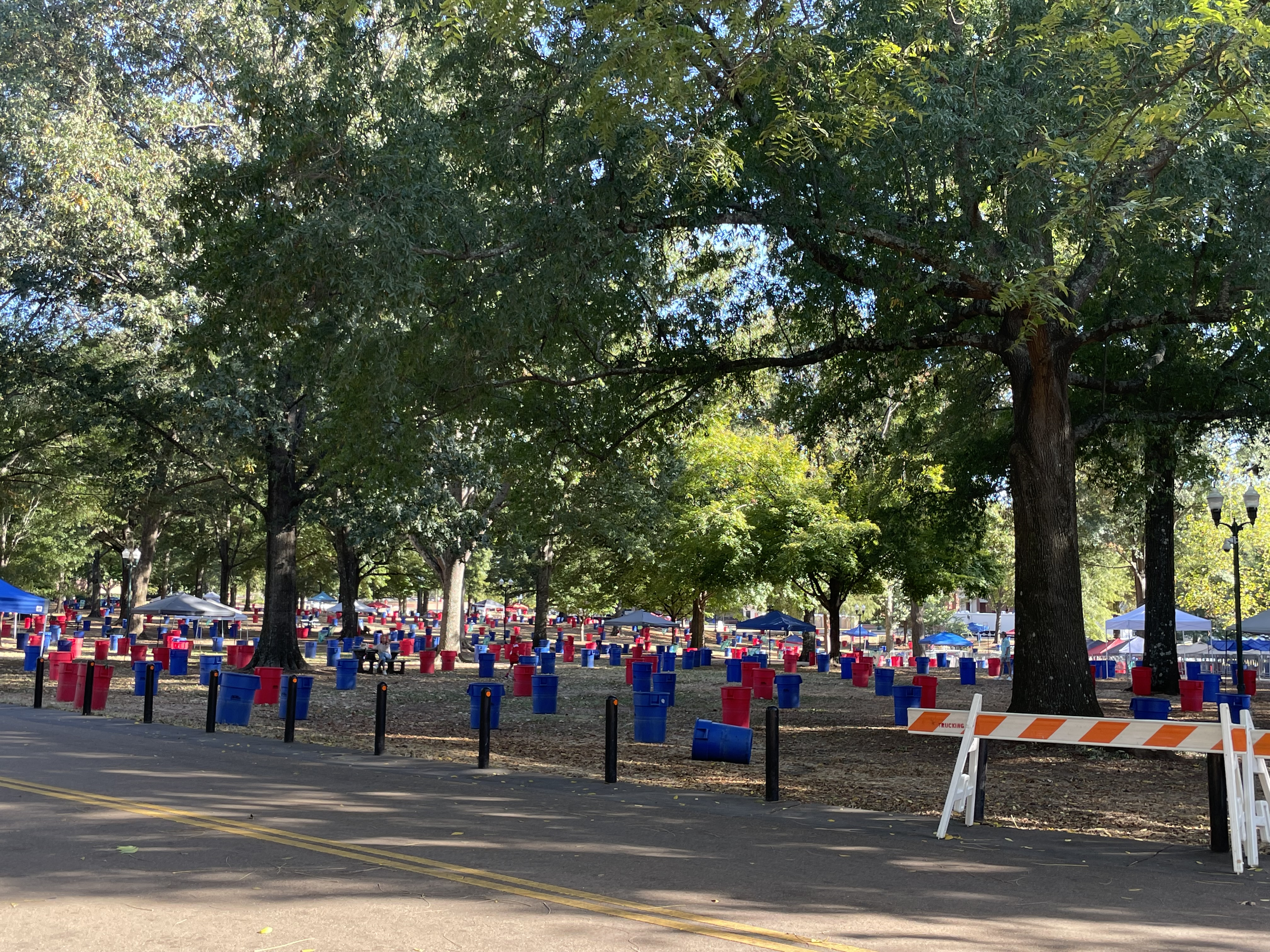
Trash Can Friday in The Grove

The Grove is the tailgating area located at the center of the University of Mississippi (Ole Miss) campus. It is approximately 10 acres (4.0 ha) in size. The Grove takes its name from "the oak, elm and magnolia trees surrounding the area".

== History ==
Originally, gathering in The Grove was an informal tailgating get-together when most serious pre-game socializing took place at the fraternity and sorority houses. By the 1950s, the Grove started to become its own pregame tradition.

Automobiles, including RV campers, have been kept out of The Grove since a rainstorm in 1991 that reduced the Grove to a rutted swamp. The autos were replaced by tents. The Ole Miss Alumni Association's Grove Society began in 1998 to preserve the 10-acre (4.0 ha) green space. The Grove Society posts a strict schedule for the event.

== Game day ==
Described as "the Holy Grail of tailgating sites" by Sporting News, The Grove comes to life for Ole Miss Rebels football home games with typically over 100,000 fans. Fans arrive often around noon the day before the game (campus rule is no one allowed to "stake their claim" before 7:30 pm, which is strictly enforced by campus police) to grab their spot in The Grove. This usually serene area of campus becomes a sea of red, white and blue tents. However, most of the tents are set up by professional tailgate vendors and not the students or families themselves. Ole Miss students generally dress in their Sunday best: Men wear slacks, button-up shirts, bow ties, boat shoes, and coats while women wear cocktail dresses or brightly colored sundresses and high heel shoes. Some older fans also dress in this style.

Many tents are set up with fine kitchenware, with lots of lace and designer doilies, fine china, chandeliers, sterling silver or silver-plated candelabras and sterling silver or silver-plated utensils along with chandeliers in some tents. Much of the food is laid out on tablecloths in sterling silver or silver-plated servers.

The food fare often consists of hors d'oeuvres, but as with most tailgating parties, barbecue still has authority. There's also traditional Southern food, including fried chicken, pork, homemade dressings, mashed potatoes and stuffed eggs. However, open flame and propane grills are not allowed in the Grove, so food is not actually allowed to be cooked at the tailgates.

Former Ole Miss football quarterback Eli Manning shared his times in The Grove as a child and as a former student:

I went a lot when I was in middle school and as a kid. You'd play pickup football in your best clothes and your parents would come looking for you. They'd find you all muddy and sweaty. People always think of it as a place for alumni and students, but some of my best memories from there are as a kid. As a student, after games I would go back into The Grove. My parents (Archie and Olivia Manning) always had a tent and we had the full setup. (We didn't have anything) too ritualistic (in our tent); nothing as fancy as some of the others get. But we always had some sort of shrimp dish, being from New Orleans. And then some sandwiches. Chili. Fried chicken. Boiled peanuts. Veggie spreads. Dip. More drinks.

== Legendary ==
ESPN ranked The Grove as the number two college football tailgating spot in the country. In its review, it said:

Tailgating in The Grove is an experience so sublime even native son William Faulkner would be at a loss to describe it.

Additionally, Sports Illustrated ranked The Grove number one. In its review, it said:

There is no more beautiful spot to tailgate, nor one richer in tradition; the Grove has been the site of pregame picnicking for more than half a century.

The New York Times called The Grove "the mother and mistress of outdoor ritual mayhem":

The glory of the Grove is legend at all of Ole Miss's rival schools in the Southeastern Conference and beyond. It is the mother and mistress of outdoor ritual mayhem.

A common saying by "Grovers" is "We may not win every game, but we've never lost a party."

Joe Cahn, known as "The Commissioner of Tailgating", said after his 2003 Tailgating tour that The Grove is "probably the most single outstanding tailgating area in the country." He continued:

There may be bigger…there may be louder…but there truly isn't any better tailgating than Ole Miss.

The Columbia Missourian newspaper called The Grove, "the mecca of tailgating in American sports."

== Walk of Champions ==
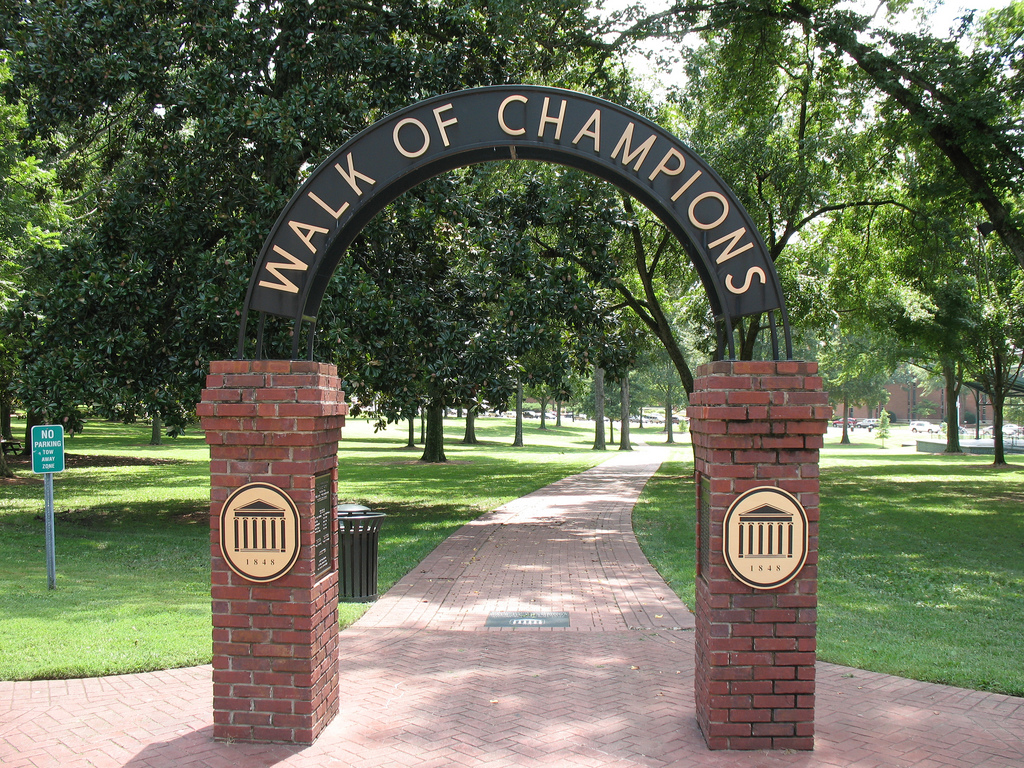
The Walk of Champions arch entrance to The Grove.

When Billy Brewer became head football coach in 1983, he was looking for a way to give fame to the football team. He would take them on a different route each game. Brewer would walk the team from Kinard Hall, the athletic dormitory, across campus to Vaught–Hemingway Stadium.

In 1985, Brewer decided on a specific route so that the fans could always see the players. Every Saturday the team would divide The Grove on the east side of the Student Union and then continue down a sidewalk in the middle of the Grove. Ole Miss fans swarm both sides of the sidewalk in order to greet the players with loud cheers before the game. The overly excited fans reach out and touch the players as they pass before them.

As the tradition continued, the ironically named "Walk of Champions" arch was built in the fall of 1998 on the east side of The Grove. The 1962 football team, which is the only team in Ole Miss football history to finish with a perfect record, gave the arch to the University. The 1962 team won the SEC title and was also named national champion retroactively by the Litkenhous Ratings. However, none of the major wire-services (AP Poll and Coaches' Poll) named the Rebels as their national champions in 1962.

== Grove Bowl ==
The Grove Bowl is the name of the annual spring intrasquad scrimmage in Vaught–Hemingway Stadium. The game is played between the "Red" squad and the "Blue" squad. Ole Miss football players are assigned to a squad by the coaches and then play a full-contact game. Tickets are sold to the game. A school-record Grove Bowl crowd of 28,375 fans attended the 2009 Grove Bowl. Tailgating in The Grove also takes place at the Grove Bowl.
