= Jorge Marín =

Mexican sculptor and painter

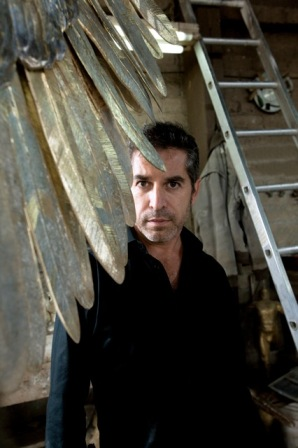
- Jorge Marín
- Born: September 22, 1963 (age 62); Uruapan, Michoacán, Mexico
- Known for: Plastic artist
- Relatives: Javier Marín (brother)
- Website: jorgemarin.com.mx

Jorge Marín (born September 22, 1963) is a Mexican sculptor and painter. He has been an active figure in the contemporary art world for the last 25 years. He began to sculpt ceramic in the early 1980s. Bronze has been his preferred material for the last ten years. His work often depicts horses, centaurs, garudas, children, madonnas, acrobats, along with elements such as spheres, masks, wings, arrows, boats and scales. These concepts are consistent with recurring themes such as reflection and balance.

== Biography ==
Marín was born in Uruapan, Michoacán, Mexico. The youngest of a family of ten brothers and sisters (which includes Javier Marín, colleague and brother), Jorge Marín inherited his passion for the fine arts from his father, a well-known architect. He left Uruapan, Michoacán to live in Mexico City when he was seven years old. Marín recalls his early years in the town of Uruapan as something like living in “Macondo,” the mystical town in the Gabriel García Márquez novel One Hundred Years of Solitude.

== Academic background ==
- 1980 Graphic Design, ENAP-UNAM, Mexico City.
- 1982 Fine Arts Restoration, Escuela Nacional de Conservación, Restauración y Museografía “Manuel Castillo Negrete” INAH-SEP, Mexico City.

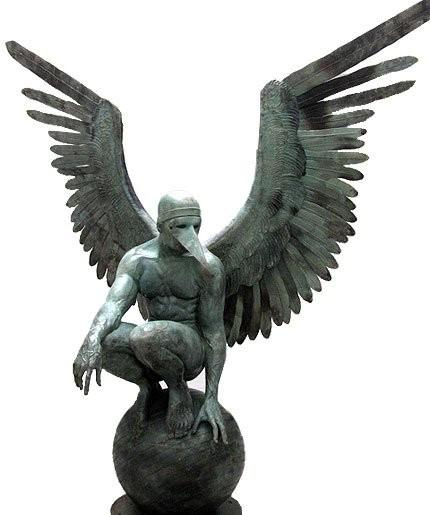
Monumental Perselidas Angel 2009 Bronze 256 x 244 x 120 cm

== Art work ==
His work focuses mainly on the human figure as a metaphor for human experience. His style is firmly rooted in the fusion of baroque dramatic art with a powerful sensuality and a subtle sense of the perverse. Direct and easy to read, his work appeals to a broad audience.

Jorge Marin´s work in sculpture is a compendium of the vital impulses of the human being and his body, which Marin interprets as the landscape of man’s own existence.

El Ángel de la Seguridad Social is installed along Mexico City's Paseo de la Reforma. El Vigilante is installed in Ecatepec de Morelos.

== Other facts ==
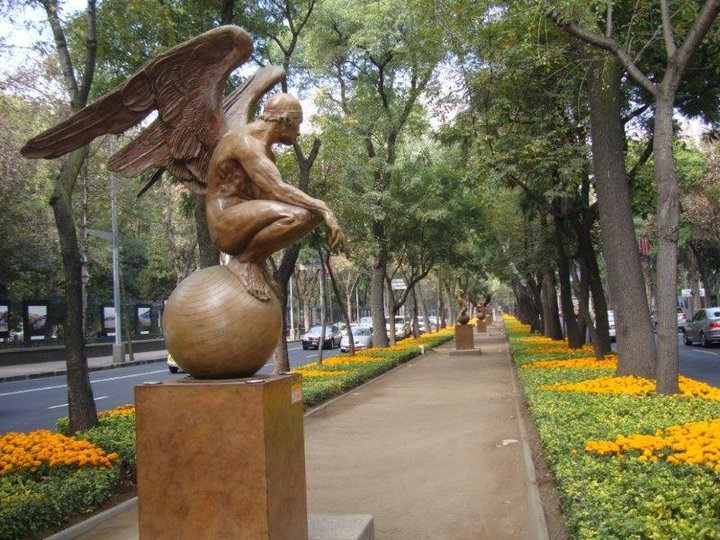
"Las Alas de la Ciudad" ("The Wings of the City"), temporary exhibition on Paseo de la Reforma

- In 2006, Jorge Marin's sculptures served as the inspiration for a dance and acrobatics production munDOSmarinOS, performed by the contemporary dance company Humanicorp.
- Since September 7, 2010, one of the most representative exhibitions of the work of the sculptor is located in Paseo de la Reforma, on the ridge opposite the Museum of Anthropology, entitled "The Wings of the City." It consists of 13 monumental works in bronze. This collection of sculptures is exhibited for the first time in a public forum.
