= Ayres Hall =

- U.S. National Register of Historic Places
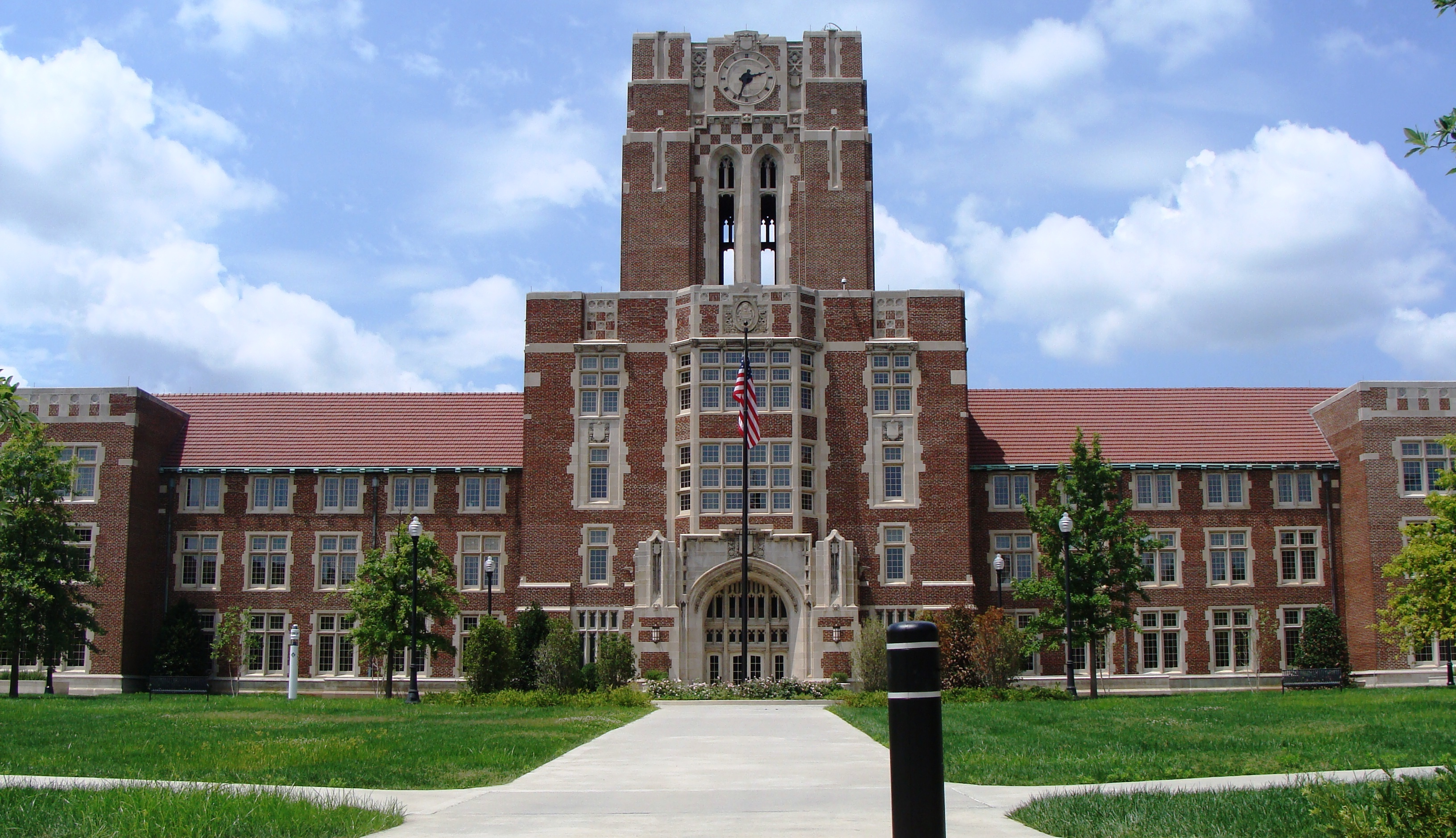

- Location within Tennessee
- Location: 1403 Circle Dr. University of Tennessee; Knoxville, Tennessee
- Coordinates: 35°57′27″N 83°55′34″W
- Built: 1921
- NRHP reference No.: 12000466
- Added to NRHP: August 1, 2012

Ayres Hall is a central iconic and historic landmark building at the University of Tennessee (UT) in Knoxville, Tennessee.

The building was designed by Miller, Fullenwider and Dowling of Chicago, and completed in 1921. It is named for Brown Ayres (1856–1919), the university's 12th president from 1904 to 1909. An extensive restoration began in the fall of 2008 and ended in January 2011. The renovations included central air conditioning and heating, terrazzo floors and benches, faces for the tower's four clocks, refurbished classroom furnishings, such as chairs, tables, and slate chalkboards, and stairways, and a north courtyard. The faces for the clocks and the terrazzo floors were in the original designs, but had never been installed due to costs. The north courtyard, which faces Cumberland Avenue, was never implemented in the original designs.

The Gothic Revival structure rises 140 feet (43 m) above its base. The distinctive checkerboard feature at the top of the tower has been replicated in UT Orange and white in the endzones at Neyland Stadium and at the ends of the court in Thompson–Boling Arena, both nearby. The building houses the offices of the university's College of Arts and Sciences as well as UT's mathematics department.
