= Plaza de las Américas Juan Pablo II =

Urban square in Zapopan, Jalisco, Mexico

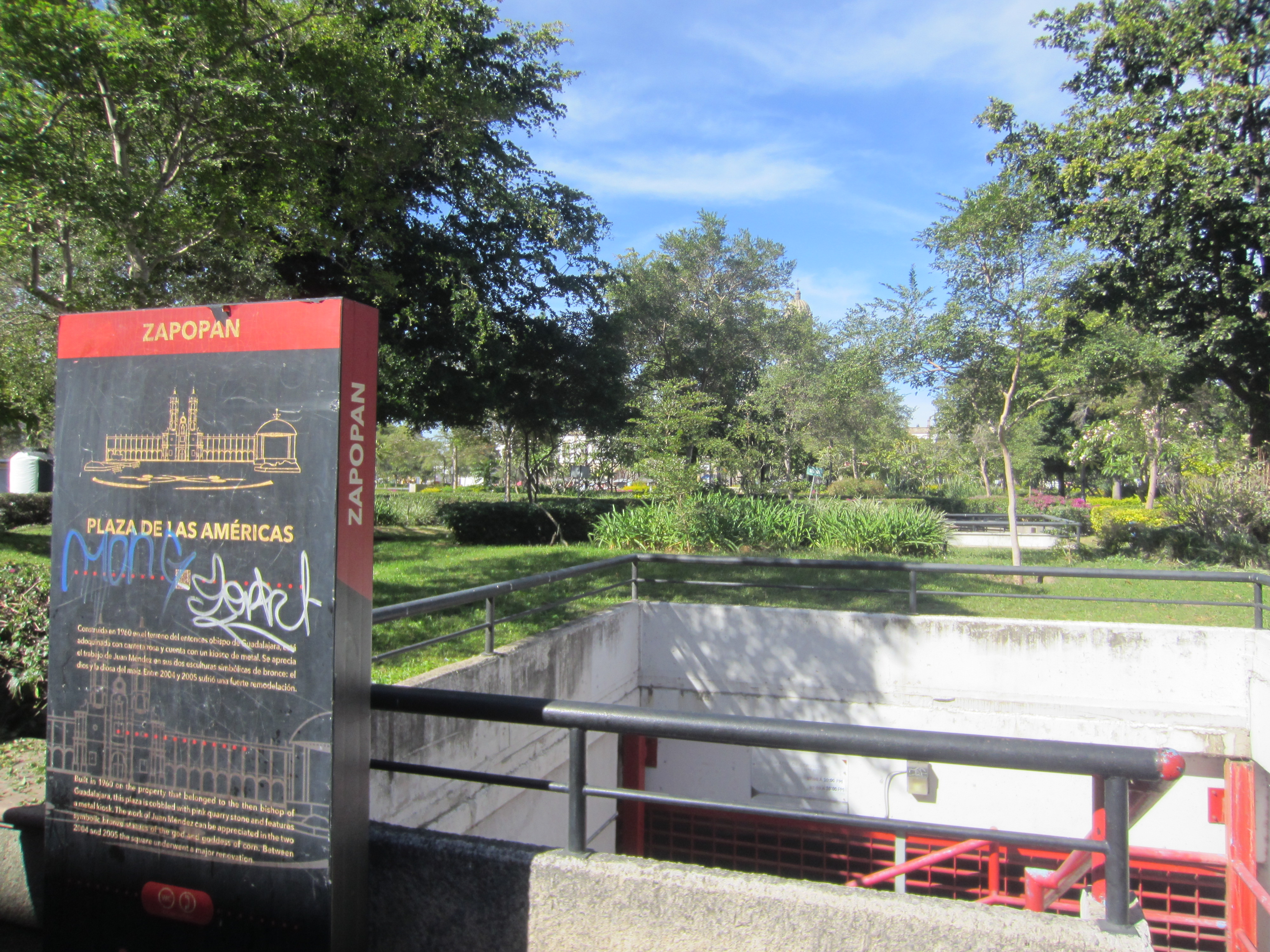
- Sign for the plaza, 2021
- Location: Zapopan, Jalisco, Mexico
- Location within Mexico
- Coordinates: 20°43′16″N 103°23′28″W

Plaza de las Américas Juan Pablo II (formerly Plaza Constitución) is an urban square in Zapopan, in the Mexican state of Jalisco.

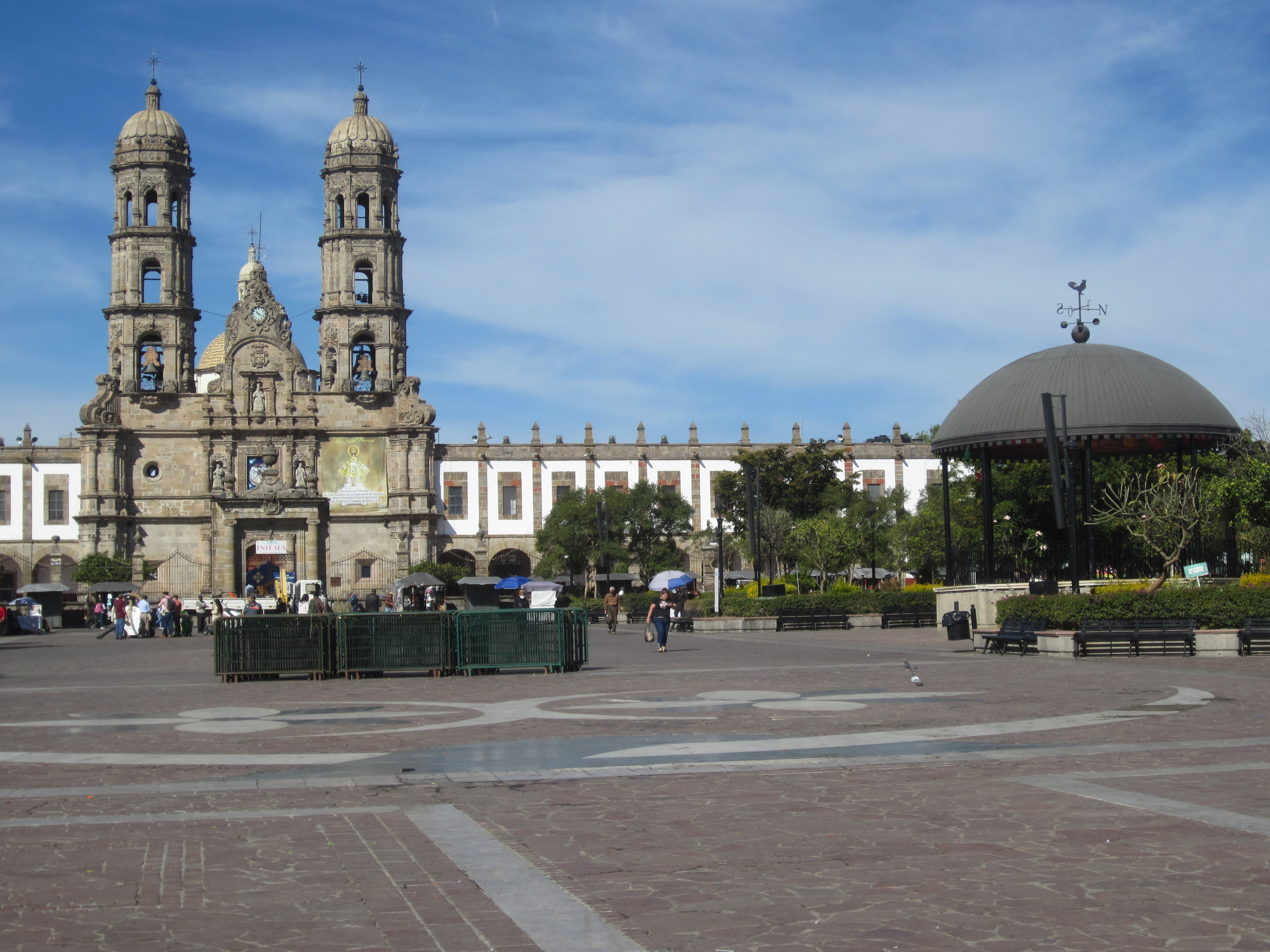
Plaza

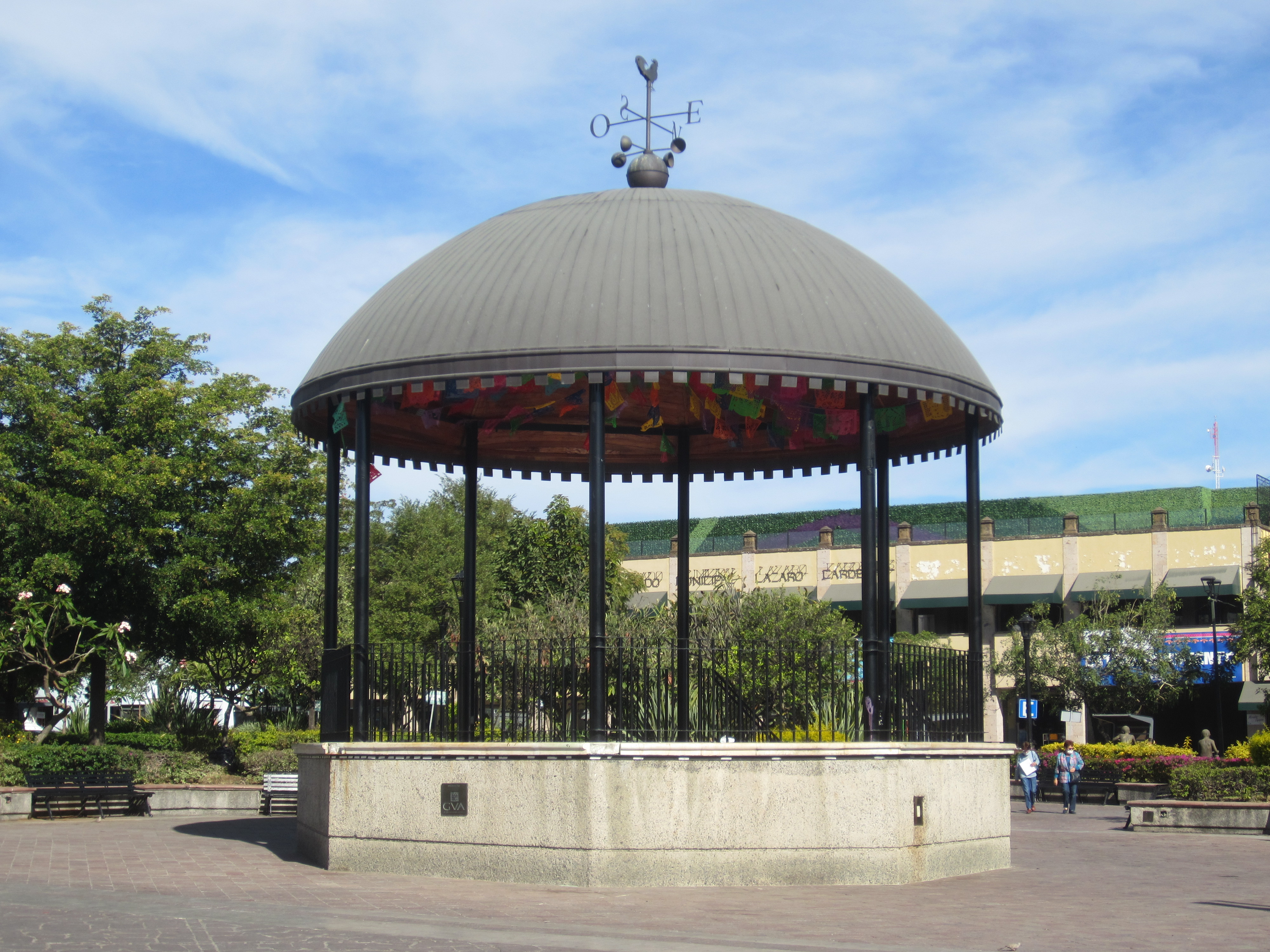
Bandstand

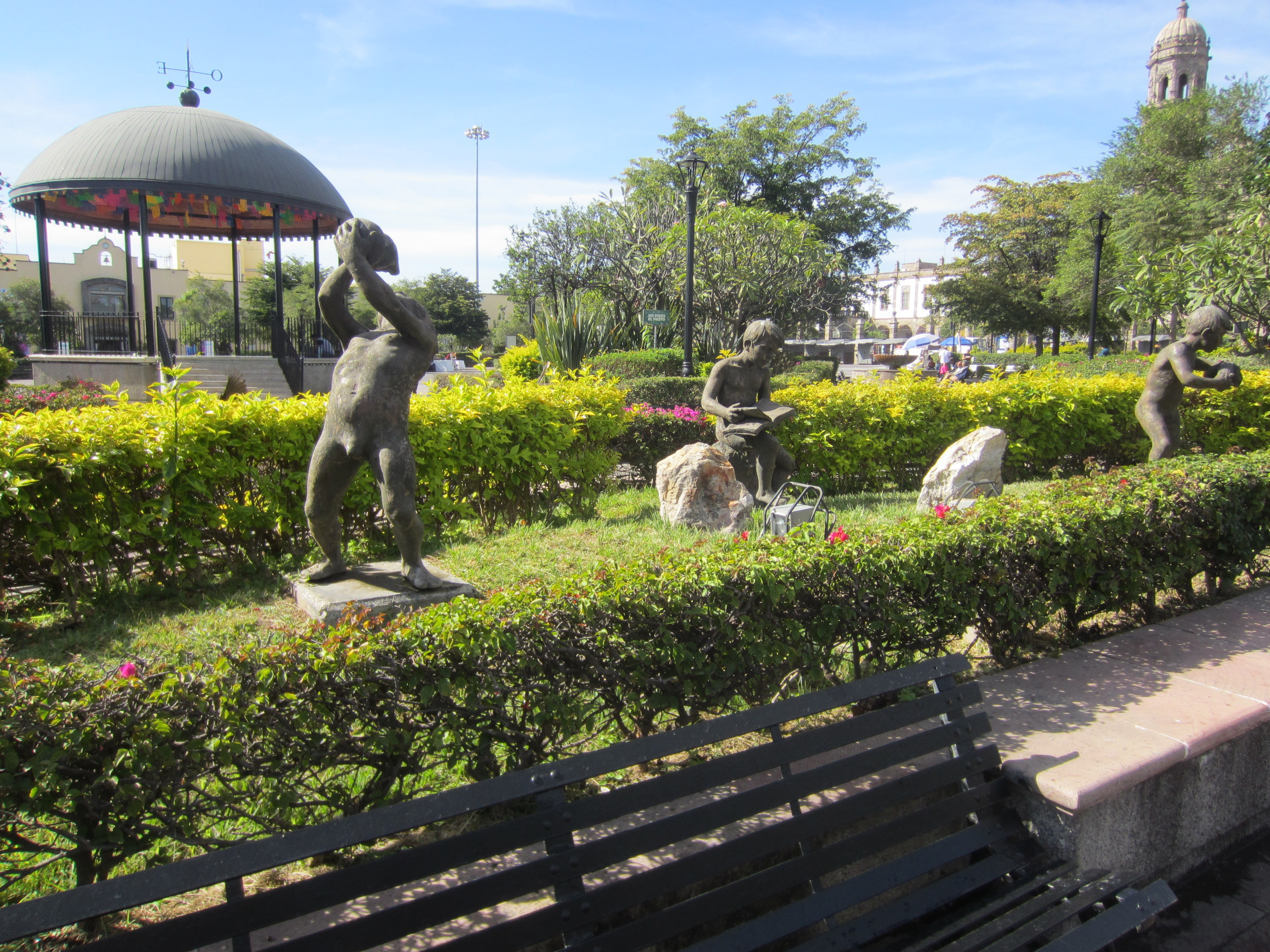
Sculptures

== See also ==
- Cabeza Vainilla, a sculpture in the square
