= Plaza of the Americas (Gainesville, Florida) =

University of Florida campus

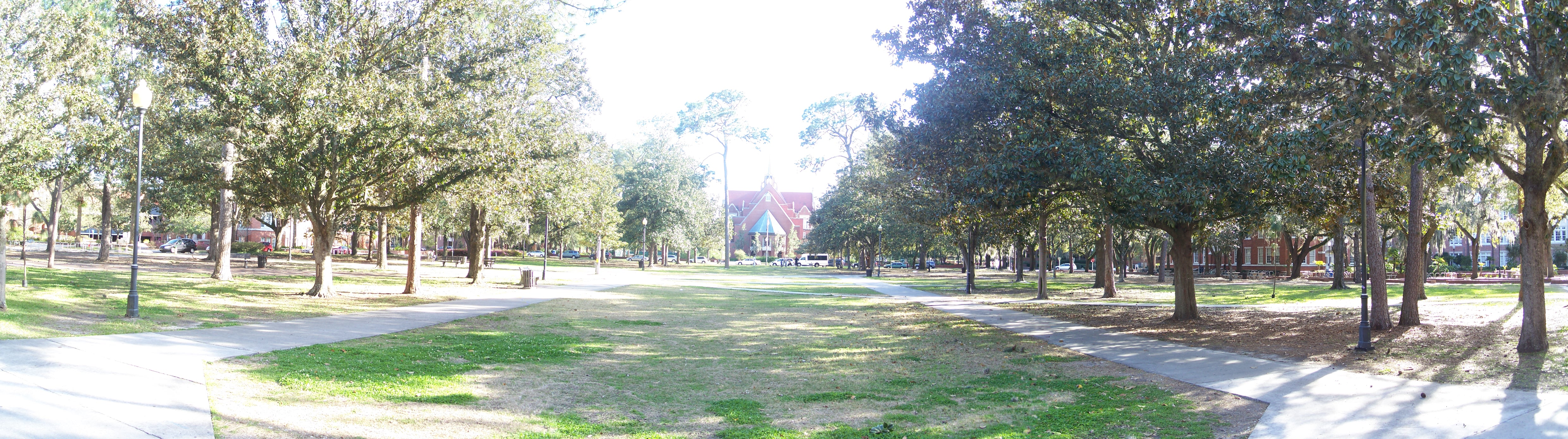
- Established: 1925
- Location: Gainesville, Florida, United States
- Campus: University of Florida
- Plaza of the Americas
- U.S. Historic district – Contributing property
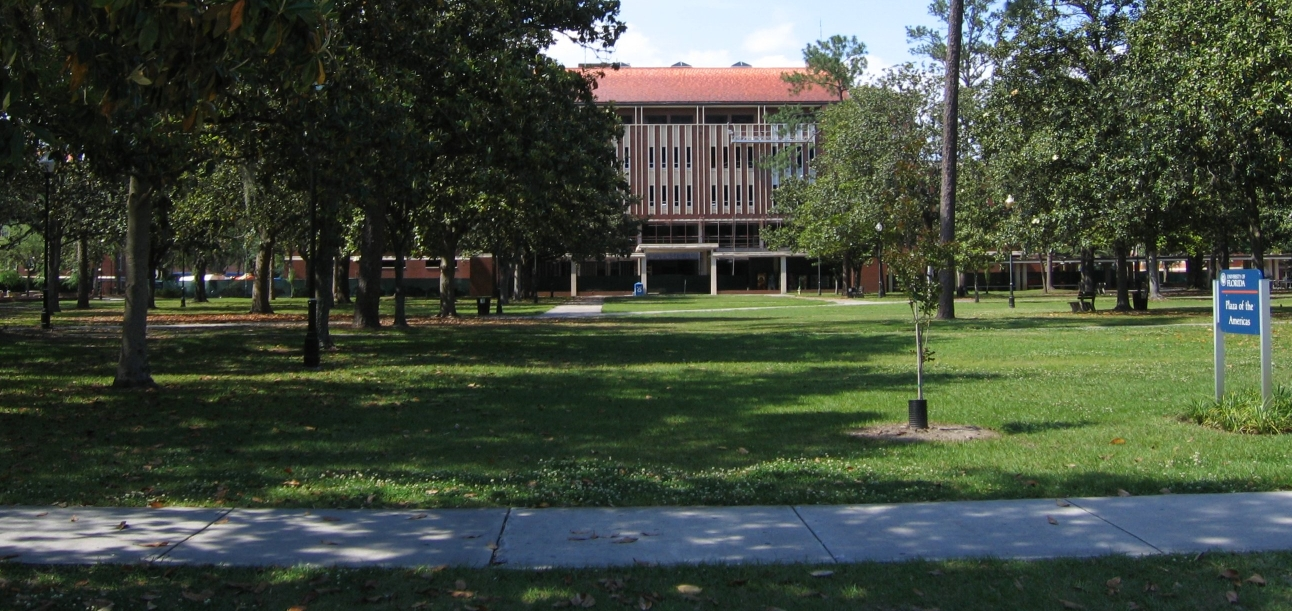
- Looking north across the plaza, towards Library West

- Location within Florida Location within the United States
- Coordinates: 29°39′1.6″N 82°20′34.75″W
- Built: 1925
- Architect: Frederick Law Olmsted Jr.

The Plaza of the Americas is a major center of student activity on the campus of the University of Florida in Gainesville, Florida. It is located in the quad between Library West, Peabody Hall, the University Auditorium, and the Chemistry Building.

In 2008, the Plaza of the Americas became a contributing property in the University of Florida Campus Historic District, which had been added to the National Register of Historic Places on April 20, 1989.

== History ==
In 1925, landscape architect Frederick Law Olmsted Jr. developed the plans to improve the plaza. In 1931, the space was officially designated the Plaza of the Americas at the first meeting of the Institute of Inter-American Affairs. The students planted 21 trees around the plaza. They dedicated the newly planted trees to the 21 countries that were invited to the meeting. Today, the quad is the unofficial forum for the University of Florida where students and organizations present their ideals.

A $2.2 million renovation of the Plaza of the Americas, which included additional landscaping, benches, and sidewalks, was begun in November 2016. The project was completed a year later, and a dedication ceremony for the renovated plaza was held on November 17, 2017.

== See also ==
- University of Florida
- Buildings at the University of Florida
- Campus Historic District
