= 2020 Purdue Boilermakers football team =

American college football season

2020 Purdue Boilermakers football
- Conference: Big Ten Conference
- West Division
- Record: 2–4 (2–4 Big Ten)
- Head coach: Jeff Brohm (4th season)
- Co-offensive coordinators: Brian Brohm (4th season); JaMarcus Shephard (3rd season)
- Offensive scheme: Spread
- Co-defensive coordinators: Bob Diaco (1st season); Anthony Poindexter (4th season)
- Base defense: Multiple
- Home stadium: Ross–Ade Stadium

Uniform
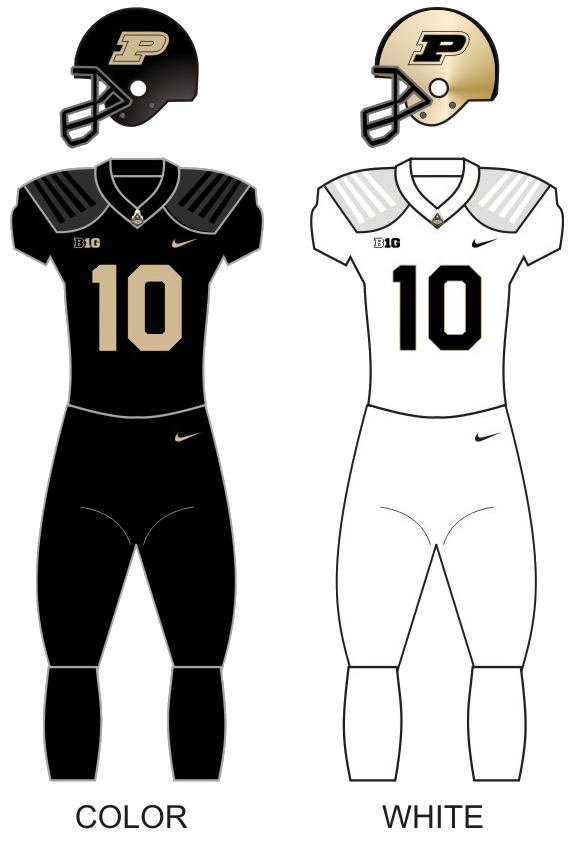

2020 Big Ten Conference football standings
	Conf.			Overall
Team	W		L	W		L
East Division
No. 2 Ohio State xy$^	5	–	0	7	–	1
No. 12 Indiana	6	–	1	6	–	2
Penn State	4	–	5	4	–	5
Maryland	2	–	3	2	–	3
Rutgers	3	–	6	3	–	6
Michigan	2	–	4	2	–	4
Michigan State	2	–	5	2	–	5
West Division
No. 10 Northwestern xy	6	–	1	7	–	2
No. 16 Iowa	6	–	2	6	–	2
Wisconsin	3	–	3	4	–	3
Minnesota	3	–	4	3	–	4
Nebraska	3	–	5	3	–	5
Purdue	2	–	4	2	–	4
Illinois	2	–	6	2	–	6
Championship: Ohio State 22, Northwestern 10
^ – College Football Playoff participant; $ – Conference champion; x – Division champion/co-champions; y – Championship game participant; Note: Due to COVID-19, the Big Ten suspended the season on August 11, but later decided to begin play on October 24. In addition to the title game that was played on December 19, the conference seeded all remaining teams for "championship week" games.; Rankings from AP Poll.

The 2020 Purdue Boilermakers football team represented Purdue University during the 2020 NCAA Division I FBS football season. The Boilermakers played their home games at Ross–Ade Stadium in West Lafayette, Indiana, and competed in the West Division of the Big Ten Conference. They were led by fourth-year head coach Jeff Brohm.

On August 11, 2020, the Big Ten Conference canceled all fall sports competitions due to the COVID-19 pandemic. However, on September 16, the Big Ten reinstated the season, announcing an eight-game season beginning on October 24.

== Spring Game ==
The 2020 Spring Game was scheduled to take place in West Lafayette on April 4, 2020, at 2:00 p.m.; however, on March 12, 2020, the Big Ten Conference canceled the remainder of all winter and spring sports seasons due to the COVID-19 pandemic.

Date	Time	Spring Game	Site	TV	Result	Source
April 17	7:00 p.m.	Gold vs. Black	Ross-Ade Stadium • West Lafaytte, IN			

== Offseason ==
=== Coaching changes ===
On December 9, 2019, the Boilermakers announced it had fired co-defensive coordinator and linebackers coach, Nick Holt. On January 2, 2020, Louisiana Tech defensive coordinator, Bob Diaco was named the defensive coordinator and linebackers coach at Purdue. On January 17, 2020, it was announced that Special Teams Coordinator, Kevin Wolthausen and defensive line coach, Reggie Johnson, would not return as assistants in 2020. On January 21, 2020, Purdue hired North Texas special teams coordinator, Marty Biagi, as their new special teams coordinator. On January 22, 2020, Purdue rounded out its coaching staff with the addition of Air Force defensive line coach, Terrance Jamison.

=== Transfers ===
Outgoing

Notable departures from the 2019 squad included:

Name	Number	Pos.	Height	Weight	Year	Hometown	Notes
Kenneth Major	2	Cornerback	6'0"	195	Sophomore (Redshirt)	Hopkinsville, Kentucky	Transferred
Cornell Jones	46	Linebacker	6'2"	235	Junior	Miami, Florida	Transferred
Alex Criddle	66	Offensive lineman	6'3"	305	Junior (Redshirt)	Broken Arrow, Oklahoma	Graduate transfer
Giovanni Reviere	91	Defensive end	6'5"	270	Sophomore (Redshirt)	Chattanooga, Tennessee	Transferred

Incoming

Name	Number	Pos.	Height	Weight	Year	Hometown	Notes	Prev. School
Austin Burton	17	Quarterback	6'2"	200	Junior (Redshirt)	Newton, Massachusetts	Graduate transfer	UCLA
D. J. Johnson	17	Safety	6'0"	180	Sophomore (Redshirt)	Indianapolis, Indiana	Transferred	Iowa
Tyler Coyle	25	Linebacker / Defensive back	6'2"	215	Senior (Redshirt)	Windsor, Connecticut	Graduate transfer	UConn
Zac Tuinei	52	Linebacker / Defensive back	6'0"	240	Freshman (Redshirt)	Michigan City, Indiana	Transferred	Arkansas State
Greg Long	69	Offensive lineman	6'4"	295	Senior (Redshirt)	El Paso, Texas	Graduate transfer	UTEP

=== 2020 NFL draft ===
Boilermakers who were picked in the 2020 NFL Draft:

Round	Pick	Player	Position	Team
4	136	Brycen Hopkins	Tight end	Los Angeles Rams
7	215	Markus Bailey	Linebacker	Cincinnati Bengals

== Schedule ==
Purdue had games scheduled against Memphis, Air Force, and Boston College, but canceled these games on July 9 due to the Big Ten Conference's decision to play a conference-only schedule due to the COVID-19 pandemic.

The Big Ten released a revised conference schedule, with every team playing a ten-game conference-only season. On September 19, 2020, yet another revised schedule was released, featuring an eight-game conference-only season plus a Championship Week cross-divisional playoff game.

Date	Time	Opponent	Site	TV	Result	Attendance
October 24	3:30 p.m.	Iowa	Ross–Ade Stadium; West Lafayette, IN	BTN	W 24–20	900
October 31	12:00 p.m.	at Illinois	Memorial Stadium; Champaign, IL (rivalry)	BTN	W 31–24	838
November 7	3:30 p.m.	at Wisconsin	Camp Randall Stadium; Madison, WI	ABC	No Contest	
November 14	7:30 p.m.	No. 23 Northwestern	Ross–Ade Stadium; West Lafayette, IN	BTN	L 20–27	886
November 20	7:30 p.m.	at Minnesota	TCF Bank Stadium; Minneapolis, MN	BTN	L 31–34	593
November 28	4:00 p.m.	Rutgers	Ross–Ade Stadium; West Lafayette, IN	FS1	L 30–37	728
December 5	12:00 p.m.	Nebraska	Ross–Ade Stadium; West Lafayette, IN	BTN	L 27–37	808
December 12	3:30 p.m.	at No. 12 Indiana	Memorial Stadium; Bloomington, IN (rivalry)	BTN	No Contest	
December 18	7:30 p.m.	at No. 11 Indiana	Memorial Stadium; Bloomington, IN (rivalry)	BTN	No Contest	
Rankings from AP Poll and CFP Rankings (after November 24) released prior to game; All times are in Eastern time

*Wisconsin's game with Purdue was cancelled due to a COVID-19 outbreak at Wisconsin. The game will not be rescheduled. Instead, Wisconsin will have a bye and will have just six games, and Purdue will have a bye and will have just seven games.

*On December 9, Purdue and Indiana announced a mutual one-time cancellation of the Old Oaken Bucket game scheduled for December 12 after team-related activities were paused because of an elevated number of coronavirus cases within both the Boilermakers' and Hoosiers' programs. On December 13, Purdue and Indiana came to a mutual agreement to reschedule the Old Oaken Bucket game for one week later, on December 18; however, on December 15, both teams again mutually agreed to cancel the Friday contest, due to issues remaining on both teams with COVID complications.

== Rankings ==
Ranking movements Legend: ██ Increase in ranking ██ Decrease in ranking — = Not ranked RV = Received votes
	Week																
Poll	Pre	1	2	3	4	5	6	7	8	9	10	11	12	13	14	15	Final
AP	—	none	—	—	—	—	—	—	RV	RV							
Coaches	—	none	—	—	—	—	—	—	—	RV	—						
CFP	Not released																Not released

== Game summaries ==
=== Iowa ===
Iowa at Purdue

Team	1	2	3	4	Total
Hawkeyes	0	17	0	3	20
• Boilermakers	7	7	0	10	24

- Date: October 24
- Location: Ross-Ade Stadium
  West Lafayette, IN
- Game start: 3:40 p.m. CDT
- Elapsed time: 3:21
- Game attendance: 900
- Game weather: 51 °F (11 °C), Mostly Sunny, Wind NE 9 mph (14 km/h)
- Referee: John O'Neill
- TV announcers (Big Ten Network): Cory Provus (play-by-play), Anthony Herron (analyst), Coley Harvey (sideline)

Scoring summary
1	7:07	PUR	David Bell 9-yard pass from Aidan O'Connell (J.D. Dellinger kick)	PUR 7–0
2	10:21	IOWA	Spencer Petras 1-yard run (Keith Duncan kick)	Tie 7–7
2	4:42	IOWA	Mekhi Sargent 1-yard run (Keith Duncan kick)	IOWA 14–7
2	1:40	PUR	David Bell 11-yard pass from Aidan O'Connell (J.D. Dellinger kick)	Tie 14–14
2	0:00	IOWA	Keith Duncan 27-yard field goal	IOWA 17–14
4	13:12	IOWA	Keith Duncan 33-yard field goal	IOWA 20–14
4	8:20	PUR	J.D. Dellinger 29-yard field goal	IOWA 20–17
4	2:15	PUR	David Bell 6-yard pass from Aidan O'Connell (J.D. Dellinger kick)	PUR 24–20

With the opening of the 2020 season, the Big Ten Conference season opened against the Hawkeyes of Iowa.

Purdue defeated Iowa, 24–20. Purdue opened the scoring when Aidan O'Connell found David Bell from 9-yards out. Iowa would tie the second in the second quarter when Spencer Petras scored from 1-yard out. The Hawkeyes then took the lead when Mekhi Sargent scored on a 1-yard run. Purdue tied the game with 1:40 remaining in the second quarter with a 11-yard Bell reception from O'Connell. Iowa would strike one final time with no time on the clock with a Keith Duncan 27-yard field goal to bring the halftime score to 17–14 in favor of the Hawkeyes. After a scoreless 3rd quarter, Iowa got the first scores of the fourth quarter on a field goal of 33-yards from Duncan to increase the lead to 6. Purdue scored again on a 29-yard J.D. Dellinger field goal. O'Connell would find Bell once more in the endzone for a 6-yard touchdown pass, and the Purdue defense would stop Iowa on 4 downs on the ensuing possession to seal the Boilermaker victory.

Purdue's October 24 season opening game was the latest season opener since 1918. Bell's three touchdown receptions were the first three or more touchdown receptions in a game since Terry Wright had three against Iowa on November 3, 2018. J.D. Dellinger's field goal was the 34th of his career and moved him into fifth all-time in Purdue history for most field goals made.

=== At Illinois ===
Purdue at Illinois
(Purdue Cannon)

Team	1	2	3	4	Total
• Boilermakers	7	10	14	0	31
Fighting Illini	0	10	0	14	24

- Date: October 31
- Location: Memorial Stadium
  Champaign, IL
- Game start: 11:06 a.m. EDT
- Elapsed time: 3:29
- Game attendance: 838
- Game weather: 48 °F (9 °C), Sunny, SE 10 mph (16 km/h)
- Referee: Jeff Servinski
- TV announcers (BTN): Brandon Gaudin (play-by-play), James Laurinaitis (analyst), Rick Pizzo (sideline)

Scoring summary
1	9:26	PUR	Zander Horvath 1-yard run (J.D. Dellinger kick)	PUR 7–0
2	11:01	PUR	Milton Wright 45-yard pass from Aidan O'Connell (J.D. Dellinger kick)	PUR 14–0
2	4:46	ILL	Mike Epstein 7-yard run (Caleb Griffin kick)	PUR 14–7
2	1:13	PUR	J.D. Dellinger 36-yard field goal	PUR 17–7
2	0:23	ILL	Caleb Griffin 28-yard field goal	PUR 17–10
3	8:47	PUR	David Bell 3-yard pass from Aidan O'Connell (J.D. Dellinger kick)	PUR 24–10
3	0:54	PUR	Jalen Graham 0-yard fumble recovery (J.D. Dellinger kick)	PUR 31–10
4	11:44	ILL	Daniel Imatorbhebhe 28-yard pass from Coran Taylor (Caleb Griffin kick)	PUR 31–17
4	6:36	ILL	Brian Hightower 9-yard pass from Coran Taylor (Caleb Griffin kick)	PUR 31–24

Purdue's next game would be on the road as they traveled to Champaign, Illinois to face off against the Illinois Fighting Illini for the Purdue Cannon.

Purdue defeated Illinois, 31–24. Purdue opened the scoring when Zander Horvath scored from the 1-yard line. Purdue would extend their lead in the second quarter when Aidan O'Connell found Milton Wright for 45-yard touchdown reception. The Fighting Illini then got on the scoreboard when Mike Epstein scored on a 7-yard run. The two teams would trade field goals to bring the halftime score to 17–10 in favor of the Boilermakers. Purdue extended their lead in the third quarter when O'Connell found David Bell on a 3-yard reception. The Boilermakers would strike again when Marvin Grant forced a Coran Taylor fumbler, recovered by Jalen Graham in the endzone. The Fighting Illini started their comeback when Taylor found Daniel Imatorbhebehe over the middle for a 28-yard reception and a 9-yard Brian Hightower touchdown catch from Taylor. Illinois was knocking on the door inside the Purdue 20 on their final possession, but were stopped short giving Purdue the 31–24 victory

Purdue's 2–0 start was their best since 2007, and that squad opened 5–0. Bell's minimum of 100 yards receiving for the fifth consecutive game for the same stat.

=== At Wisconsin (canceled) ===
Purdue at Wisconsin (CANCELLED)

Team	1	2	3	4	Total
~~Boilermakers~~	0	0	0	0	0
~~Badgers~~	0	0	0	0	0

- Date: October 31
- Location:
  Camp Randall Stadium
  Madison, WI
- Television network: ABC

The Purdue at Wisconsin game was canceled due to a COVID-19 outbreak at Wisconsin. The game will not be rescheduled. Instead, the Purdue Boilermakers will have a bye, and will play just seven games.

=== Northwestern ===
No. 23 Northwestern at Purdue

Team	1	2	3	4	Total
• No. 23 Wildcats	7	10	7	3	27
Boilermakers	3	7	3	7	20

- Date: November 14
- Location:
  Ross-Ade Stadium
  West Lafayette, IN
- Game start: 5:10 p.m. EDT
- Elapsed time: 3:20
- Game attendance: 886
- Game weather: 46 °F (8 °C), Overcast, SE 10 mph (16 km/h)
- Referee: Jeff Servinski
- TV announcers (BTN): Cory Provus (play-by-play), Anthony Herron (analyst), Olivia Dekker (sideline)

Scoring summary
1	9:00	NW	Ramaud Chiaokhiao-Bowman 8-yard pass from Peyton Ramsey (Charlie Kuhbander kick)	NW 7–0
1	1:20	PUR	J. D. Dellinger 30-yard field goal	NW 7–3
2	12:07	NW	Charlie Kuhbander 46-yard field goal	NW 10–3
2	7:27	PUR	Garrett Miller 40-yard pass from Aidan O'Connell (J. D. Dellinger kick)	TIE 10–10
2	3:06	NW	Ramaud Chiaokhiao-Bowman 18-yard pass from Peyton Ramsey (Charlie Kuhbander kick)	NW 17–10
3	7:39	NW	Ramaud Chiaokhiao-Bowman 5-yard pass from Peyton Ramsey (Charlie Kuhbander kick)	NW 24–10
3	3:45	PUR	J. D. Dellinger 23-yard field goal	NW 24–13
4	12:34	NW	Charlie Kuhbander 42-yard field goal	NW 27–13
4	7:35	PUR	Milton Wright 14-yard pass from Aidan O'Connell (J. D. Dellinger kick)	NW 27–20

Purdue would return home to face the Northwestern Wildcats in a battle for first place in the West Division of the Big Ten.

Northwestern defeated Purdue, 27–20.

== Roster ==
2020 Purdue Boilermakers football team roster
Players
Coaches
Offense

Pos.	#	Name	Class
WR	0	Milton Wright	So
QB	1	Michael Alaimo	Fr
WR	2	Abdur-Rahmaan Yaseen	Fr
WR	3	David Bell	So
WR	4	Rondale Moore	Jr
RB	5	Da'Joun Hewitt	Fr
WR	6	Maliq Carr	Fr
RB	7	Tirek Murphy	Fr
WR	8	T. J. Sheffield	Fr
WR	9	Mershawn Rice	Fr
WR	10	Amad Anderson	So
WR	12	Jared Sparks	Sr
QB	13	Jack Plummer	So
WR	14	Marcellus Moore	Fr
QB	16	Aidan O'Connell	Jr
QB	17	Austin Burton	Jr
QB	18	Paul Piferi	Fr
QB	19	Jack Albers	Fr
RB	20	Alfred Armour	So
QB	21	Andrew Hobson	Fr
RB	22	King Doerue	So
WR	25	Jake Smith	Fr
WR	33	Jackson Anthrop	Sr
RB	35	Henry Lewis	Fr
RB	40	Zander Horvath	Jr
TE	48	Kyle Bilodeau	Fr
OL	53	Gus Hartwig	Fr
OL	54	Josh Kaltenberger	Fr
OL	58	Jimmy McKenna	So
OL	59	Dave Monnot III	Fr
OL	62	Ben Kuhns	Fr
OL	64	Luke Morris	Fr
OL	65	Marc Rolland	Jr
OL	67	Gus German	Fr
OL	68	Cam Craig	Fr
OL	69	Greg Long	Sr
OL	70	Will Bramel	So
OL	71	Nalin Fox	Fr
OL	72	Sam Garvin	Jr
OL	73	Kyle Jornigan	Fr
OL	74	Eric Miller	So
OL	75	Spencer Holstege	Fr
OL	76	Mark Stickford	Jr
OL	77	D. J. Washington	Jr
OL	78	Grant Hermanns	Sr
OL	79	Jared Bycnski	Fr
WR	80	Camdyn Childers	Fr
WR	81	Collin Sullivan	Fr
WR	82	Grant Summers	Fr
TE	83	Jack Cravaack	So
WR	85	Alex Maxwell	Fr
WR	85	Daniel Roach	Fr
WR	86	Kory Taylor	So
TE	87	Payne Durham	So
TE	88	Garrett Miller	Fr
WR	89	Andrew Sowinski	Fr
TE	91	Ben Buechel	Fr

Defense

Pos.	#	Name	Class
CB	1	Dedrick Mackey	Jr
S	4	Marvin Grant	Fr
DE	5	George Karlaftis	So
S	6	Jalen Graham	So
DT	8	Anthony Watts	Sr
DT	9	Lorenzo Neal (C)	Sr
DB	11	Kadin Smith	So
DE	12	Dontay Hunter II	Fr
CB	13	Geovonte' Howard	Jr
S	15	DaMarcus Mitchell	Jr
S	17	D. J. Johnson	So
CB	18	Cam Allen	So
S	21	Sanoussi Kane	Fr
S	23	Cory Trice	So
DB	24	Nyles Beverly	Fr
LB, DB	25	Tyler Coyle	Sr
CB	27	Anthony Romphf	Fr
CB	29	Simeon Smiley	Sr
LB	32	Elijah Ball	So
S	34	Ryan Brandt	Fr
S	35	Antonio Stevens	Fr
LB	36	Jaylan Alexander	Jr
LB	37	Caleb Lahey	Fr
LB	37	Jacob Wahlberg	Fr
S	38	Brennan Thieneman	Sr
LB	39	Zach Randall	Jr
LB	41	Khali Saunders	Fr
LB	42	Clyde Washington	Fr
LB	43	Kieren Douglas	Jr
LB	44	Kydran Jenkins	Fr
LB	45	Byron Hubbard II	So
DL	47	Jeff Marks	So
S	49	Zane Greene	So
DE	50	Solomon Kpaka	Fr
LB	51	Chase Triplett	Fr
LB, S	52	Zac Tuinei	Fr
LB	54	Ben Kreul	Fr
DE	55	Derrick Barnes	Jr
LB	57	Will Chapman	Fr
DL	58	Branson Deen	So
DL	59	K. J. Stokes	So
DL	90	Lawrence Johnson	So
DT	92	Bryce Austin	Fr
DT	93	Steven Faucheux	Fr
DE	94	Robert McWilliams III	Jr
LB	95	Hayden Ellinger	Fr
LB	96	Ben Furtney	Fr
DE	97	Semisi Fakasiieiki	Sr
DE	98	Greg Hudgins III	Fr
DL	99	Jack Sullivan	So

Special teams

Pos.	#	Name	Class
P	19	Brooks Cormier	So
P	28	Zac Collins	Jr
LS	30	Brooks Royal	Jr
LS	31	Nick Zecchino	Sr
LS	46	Nick Taylor	Fr
P	47	Brendan Cropsey	Fr
K	57	Chris Van Eekeren	Fr
K	84	Edward Dellinger	Fr
K	85	J. D. Dellinger	Sr
LS	96	Hunter MacDonald	Fr

Head coach

- Jeff Brohm

Coordinators/assistant coaches

- Marty Biagi (Special Teams Coordinator / Defensive Assistant)
- Brian Brohm (Co-Offensive Coordinator / Quarterbacks)
- Bob Diaco (Defensive Coordinator / Linebackers)
- Anthony Poindexter (Co-Defensive Coordinator / Secondary)
- JaMarcus Shephard (Co-Offensive Coordinator / Wide Receivers)
- Chris Barclay (Running Backs)
- Greg Brown (Cornerbacks)
- Terrance Jamison (Defensive Line)
- Ryan Wallace (Tight Ends / Special Teams Assistant)
- Dale Williams (Offensive Line)
- Neil Callaway (Offensive Assistant)
- Greg Brohm (Chief of Staff)
- JMichael Jonard (Quality Control)
- Dan Rowe (Quality Control)
- Justin Sinz (Quality Control)
- Domenic Reno (Director of Football Strength & Conditioning)
- Dennis Love (Associate Director of Football
  Strength & Conditioning)
- Keith Swift (Assistant Director of Football
  Strength & Conditioning)

Legend

- (C) Team captain
- (S) Suspended
- (I) Ineligible
- Injured
- Redshirt

Roster

== Awards and honors ==
Weekly Awards
Player	Award	Date Awarded	Ref.
David Bell	Big Ten Co-Offensive Player of the Week	October 26, 2020	

== Players drafted into the NFL ==
Round	Pick	Player	Position	NFL Club
2	49	Rondale Moore	WR	Arizona Cardinals
4	113	Derrick Barnes	ILB	Detroit Lions
