= 2021 Purdue Boilermakers football team =

American college football season

2021 Purdue Boilermakers football

Music City Bowl champion

Music City Bowl, W 48–45 ^{OT} vs. Tennessee
- Conference: Big Ten Conference
- West Division
- Record: 9–4 (6–3 Big Ten)
- Head coach: Jeff Brohm (5th season)
- Co-offensive coordinators: Brian Brohm (5th season); JaMarcus Shephard (4th season)
- Offensive scheme: Spread
- Defensive coordinator: Brad Lambert (1st season)
- Co-defensive coordinators: Ron English (1st season); Mark Hagen (1st season)
- Base defense: Multiple 4–2–5
- Home stadium: Ross–Ade Stadium

2021 Big Ten Conference football standings
	Conf.			Overall
Team	W		L	W		L
East Division
No. 3 Michigan xy$^	8	–	1	12	–	2
No. 6 Ohio State x	8	–	1	11	–	2
No. 9 Michigan State	7	–	2	11	–	2
Penn State	4	–	5	7	–	6
Maryland	3	–	6	7	–	6
Rutgers	2	–	7	5	–	8
Indiana	0	–	9	2	–	10
West Division
No. 23 Iowa xy	7	–	2	10	–	4
Minnesota	6	–	3	9	–	4
Wisconsin	6	–	3	9	–	4
Purdue	6	–	3	9	–	4
Illinois	4	–	5	5	–	7
Nebraska	1	–	8	3	–	9
Northwestern	1	–	8	3	–	9
Championship: Michigan 42, Iowa 3
^ – College Football Playoff participant; $ – Conference champion; x – Division champion/co-champions; y – Championship game participant; Rankings from AP Poll

The 2021 Purdue Boilermakers football team represented Purdue University during the 2021 NCAA Division I FBS football season. The Boilermakers played their home games at Ross–Ade Stadium in West Lafayette, Indiana, and competed as members of the West Division in the Big Ten Conference. This was head coach Jeff Brohm's fifth season with Purdue.

== Offseason ==
=== Coaching changes ===
On December 17, 2020, Purdue announced that defensive coordinator Bob Diaco would not return to the coaching staff. On January 10, 2021, the school hired Mark Hagen as defensive line coach, replacing Terrance Jamison. Hagen had coached at Purdue from 2000 to 2010 and was most recently at Texas. Later that month, Brad Lambert from Marshall was hired as defensive coordinator and linebackers coach, while Ron English from Florida was hired as cornerback coach. In April, Jamal Adams from Navy was hired as cornerback coach. On June 16, Jeff Brohm announced that Lambert, English, and Hagen would all serve as co-defensive coordinators in addition to their regular coaching duties, with Lambert making the game-day play calls. Former graduate assistants Justin Sinz and TJ McCollum would move to recruiting positions. In August, David Elson from Marian University was hired as quality control assistant and Mel Mills was hired as director of player development.

=== Transfers ===
Outgoing

Notable departures from the 2020 squad included:

Name	Number	Pos.	Height	Weight	Year	Hometown	Notes
Maliq Carr	6	Wide receiver	6'4"	230	Sophomore	Oak Park, Michigan	Transferred
Amad Anderson	10	Wide receiver	5'11"	170	Junior (Redshirt)	Staten Island, New York	Transferred
Jared Sparks	12	Wide receiver	6'1"	200	Senior (Redshirt)	Geismar, Louisiana	Graduate transfer
Geovonte Howard	13	Cornerback	5'11"	185	Senior	Missouri City, Texas	Transferred
Steven Faucheux	93	Linebacker	6'5"	272	Sophomore (Redshirt)	West Chester, Ohio	Transferred

Incoming

Name	Number	Pos.	Height	Weight	Year	Hometown	Notes	Prev. School
Octavius Brothers	20	Linebacker	6'2"	210	Sophomore	Brevard County, Florida	Transferred	Auburn
Broc Thompson	29	Wide receiver	6'3"	181	Junior	Indianapolis, Indiana	Transferred	Marshall
Damarjhe Lewis	34	Linebacker / Defensive back	6'3"	301	Freshman (Redshirt)	Griffin, Georgia	Transferred	Indiana
Dylan Downing	38	Running back	5'11"	212	Freshman (Redshirt)	Carmel, Indiana	Transferred	UNLV
Tyler Witt	78	Offensive lineman	6'2"	295	Graduate	Joliet, Illinois	Graduate transfer	Western Kentucky
Joseph Anderson	95	Defensive end	6'4"	268	Sophomore	Murfreesboro, Tennessee	Transferred	South Carolina
C. J. McWilliams		Cornerback	5'11"	164	Senior (Redshirt)	Miami, Florida	Graduate transfer	Florida

=== 2021 NFL draft ===
Boilermakers who were picked in the 2021 NFL Draft:

Round	Pick	Player	Position	Team
2	49	Rondale Moore	Wide receiver	Arizona Cardinals
4	113	Derrick Barnes	Linebacker	Detroit Lions

== Preseason ==
=== Recruits ===
The Boilermakers signed a total of 16 recruits.

College recruiting (2021)
Name	Hometown	School	Height	Weight	Commit date
Yanni Karlaftis; LB	West Lafayette, IN	West Lafayette High School	6 ft 3 in (1.91 m)	215 lb (98 kg)	Dec 17, 2020
Yanni Karlaftis; LB	Recruit ratings: Scout: Rivals: 247Sports: ESPN:				
Preston Terrell; WR	Brownsburg, IN	Brownsburg High School	6 ft 3 in (1.91 m)	186 lb (84 kg)	Sep 15, 2019
Preston Terrell; WR	Recruit ratings: Scout: Rivals: 247Sports: ESPN:				
Deion Burks; WR	Belleville, MI	Belleville High School	5 ft 10 in (1.78 m)	175 lb (79 kg)	May 13, 2020
Deion Burks; WR	Recruit ratings: Scout: Rivals: 247Sports: ESPN:				
Jah'von Grigsby; DB	Baton Rouge, LA	Scotlandville Magnet High School	6 ft 0 in (1.83 m)	185 lb (84 kg)	Dec 5, 2020
Jah'von Grigsby; DB	Recruit ratings: Scout: Rivals: 247Sports: ESPN:				
Zach Richards; OL	Mooresville, IN	Mooresville High School	6 ft 3 in (1.91 m)	285 lb (129 kg)	Apr 24, 2020
Zach Richards; OL	Recruit ratings: Scout: Rivals: 247Sports: ESPN:				
J. Alstott-VanDeVanter; OL	Mooresville, IN	Mooresville High School	6 ft 6 in (1.98 m)	275 lb (125 kg)	Jan 9, 2020
J. Alstott-VanDeVanter; OL	Recruit ratings: Scout: Rivals: 247Sports: ESPN:				
Marcus Mbow; OL	Wauwatosa, WI	Wauwatosa East High School	6 ft 5 in (1.96 m)	310 lb (140 kg)	Dec 16, 2020
Marcus Mbow; OL	Recruit ratings: Scout: Rivals: 247Sports: ESPN:				
Rickey Smith; DB	Orlando, FL	Jones High School	6 ft 1 in (1.85 m)	180 lb (82 kg)	Jul 28, 2020
Rickey Smith; DB	Recruit ratings: Scout: Rivals: 247Sports: ESPN:				
Tristan Cox; LB	Pulaski County, KY	Pulaski County High School	6 ft 3 in (1.91 m)	228 lb (103 kg)	Apr 8, 2020
Tristan Cox; LB	Recruit ratings: Scout: Rivals: 247Sports: ESPN:				
Brandon Calloway; DB	Griffin, GA	Griffin High School	6 ft 1 in (1.85 m)	184 lb (83 kg)	Mar 15, 2020
Brandon Calloway; DB	Recruit ratings: Scout: Rivals: 247Sports: ESPN:				
Ja'Quez Cross; ATH	Fordyce, AR	Fordyce High School	5 ft 10 in (1.78 m)	170 lb (77 kg)	Oct 30, 2020
Ja'Quez Cross; ATH	Recruit ratings: Scout: Rivals: 247Sports: ESPN:				
Khordae Sydnor; DE	New Rochelle, NY	Iona Preparatory School	6 ft 5 in (1.96 m)	230 lb (100 kg)	Apr 25, 2020
Khordae Sydnor; DE	Recruit ratings: Scout: Rivals: 247Sports: ESPN:				
Mahamane Moussa; OL	Indianapolis, IN	Pike High School	6 ft 4 in (1.93 m)	268 lb (122 kg)	Aug 11, 2020
Mahamane Moussa; OL	Recruit ratings: Scout: Rivals: 247Sports: ESPN:				
Drew Biber; TE	Cedarburg, WI	Cedarburg High School	6 ft 5 in (1.96 m)	215 lb (98 kg)	Oct 18, 2020
Drew Biber; TE	Recruit ratings: Scout: Rivals: 247Sports: ESPN:				
Devin Mockobee; RB	Boonville, IN	Boonville High School	6 ft 0 in (1.83 m)	195 lb (88 kg)	Jun 16, 2021
Devin Mockobee; RB	Recruit ratings: Rivals: 247Sports:				
Jack Ansell; P	Warrnambool, Australia	Brauer College	6 ft 2 in (1.88 m)	205 lb (93 kg)	
Jack Ansell; P	Recruit ratings: No ratings found				
Overall recruit ranking: Scout: 76 Rivals: 76 247Sports: 76
Note: In many cases, Scout, Rivals, 247Sports, On3, and ESPN may conflict in their listings of height and weight.; In these cases, the average was taken. ESPN grades are on a 100-point scale.; Sources: "Purdue Football Commitments". Rivals.; "ESPN". ESPN.; "2021 Team Ranking". Rivals.com.

== Schedule ==
The 2021 schedule consists of 6 home and 6 away games in the regular season.

2021 Purdue Boilermakers season results
Date	Time	Opponent	Rank	Site	TV	Result	Attendance
September 4	7:00 p.m.	Oregon State*		Ross–Ade Stadium; West Lafayette, IN	FS1	W 30–21	53,656
September 11	3:00 p.m.	at UConn*		Rentschler Field; East Hartford, CT	CBSSN	W 49–0	14,817
September 18	2:30 p.m.	at No. 12 Notre Dame*		Notre Dame Stadium; Notre Dame, IN (rivalry)	NBC	L 13–27	74,341
September 25	3:30 p.m.	Illinois		Ross–Ade Stadium; West Lafayette, IN (Purdue Cannon)	BTN	W 13–9	52,840
October 2	12:00 p.m.	Minnesota^{†}		Ross–Ade Stadium; West Lafayette, IN	BTN	L 13–20	51,111
October 16	3:30 p.m.	at No. 2 Iowa		Kinnick Stadium; Iowa City, IA	ABC	W 24–7	69,250
October 23	3:00 p.m.	Wisconsin	No. 25	Ross–Ade Stadium; West Lafayette, IN	BTN	L 13–30	61,320
October 30	3:30 p.m.	at Nebraska		Memorial Stadium; Lincoln, NE	ESPN2	W 28–23	85,902
November 6	3:30 p.m.	No. 3 Michigan State		Ross–Ade Stadium; West Lafayette, IN	ABC	W 40–29	57,748
November 13	3:30 p.m.	at No. 4 Ohio State	No. 19	Ohio Stadium; Columbus, OH	ABC	L 31–59	101,009
November 20	12:00 p.m.	at Northwestern		Wrigley Field; Chicago, IL (Wildcats Classic)	BTN	W 32–14	31,500
November 27	3:30 p.m.	Indiana		Ross–Ade Stadium; West Lafayette, IN (Old Oaken Bucket)	FS1	W 44–7	61,320
December 30	3:00 p.m.	vs. Tennessee*		Nissan Stadium; Nashville, TN (Music City Bowl)	ESPN	W 48–45 ^{OT}	69,489
*Non-conference game; ^{†}Homecoming; Rankings from AP and CFP Rankings after November 2; All times are in Eastern time; Source:

== Roster ==
2021 Purdue Boilermakers football team roster
Players
Coaches
Offense

Pos.	#	Name	Class
WR	0	Milton Wright	Jr
QB	1	Michael Alaimo	Fr
WR	2	Abdur-Rahmaan Yaseen (injured)	Fr
WR	3	David Bell	Jr
WR	8	TJ Sheffield	RSo
WR	9	Mershawn Rice (injured)	RSo
QB	11	Jack Albers	RSo
QB	12	Austin Burton	RSr
QB	13	Jack Plummer	RJr
QB	16	Aidan O'Connell	RSr
QB	17	Christian Gelov	Fr
WR	18	Deion Burks	Fr
QB	21	Andrew Hobson	Fr
RB	22	King Doerue	Jr
WR	25	Marcellus Moore	Fr
WR	26	Andrew Sowinski	Fr
RB	28	Ja'Quez Cross	Fr
WR	29	Broc Thompson	Jr
RB	32	Zac Tuinei	Fr
WR	33	Jackson Anthrop	Sr
WR	34	Ben Van Noord	Fr
WR	35	Hayden Parise	Fr
RB	37	Caleb Lahey	Fr
RB	38	Dylan Downing	Fr
RB	39	Will Chapman	RSo
RB	40	Zander Horvath	RSr
RB	45	Devin Mockobee	Fr
TE	48	Kyle Bilodeau	RSo
OL	53	Gus Hartwig	So
OL	54	Josh Kaltenberger	Fr
OL	59	Dave Monnot III	RSo
OL	61	Aaron Roberts	Fr
OL	62	Ben Kuhns	RSo
OL	63	Marcus Mbow	Fr
OL	64	Mahamane Moussa	Fr
OL	65	Jaelin Alstott-VanDeVanter	Fr
OL	67	Gus German	Fr
OL	68	Cam Craig	RSo
OL	69	Greg Long	Sr
OL	70	Zach Richards	Fr
OL	71	Nalin Fox	Fr
OL	72	Sam Garvin	RSr
OL	74	Eric Miller	RJr
OL	75	Spencer Holstege	RSo
OL/DL	77	DJ Washington (injured)	RSr
OL	78	Tyler Witt	GS
OL	79	Jared Bycznski	Fr
WR	80	Camdyn Childers	RSo
WR	81	Collin Sullivan	Fr
TE	82	Drew Biber	Fr
TE	83	Jack Cravaack (injured)	RJr
WR	84	Preston Terrell	Fr
WR	85	Alex Maxwell	Fr
WR	86	Kory Taylor	RJr
TE	87	Payne Durham	RJr
TE	88	Garrett Miller	RSo
TE	89	Paul Piferi	RSo
TE	91	Ben Buechel	Fr

Defense

Pos.	#	Name	Class
CB	1	Dedrick Mackey	RSr
S	4	Marvin Grant	RSo
DE	5	George Karlaftis	Jr
LB/S	6	Jalen Graham	Jr
CB	7	Jamari Brown	Jr
S	10	Cam Allen	Jr
S	12	Jah’von Grigsby	Fr
LB	14	Yanni Karlaftis	Fr
DE	15	DaMarcus Mitchell	Sr
S	17	Chris Jefferson	Sr
LB	20	OC Brothers	So
S	21	Sanoussi Kane	So
CB	23	Cory Trice (injured)	RJr
CB	24	Nyles Beverly	RSo
CB	26	Brandon Calloway	Fr
CB	27	Anthony Romphf	Fr
CB	29	Rickey Smith	Fr
S	30	Ryan Brandt	So
S	32	Elijah Ball	RJr
DT	34	Damarjhe Lewis	Fr
S	35	Antonio Stevens	So
LB	36	Jaylan Alexander	Sr
LB	37	Jacob Wahlberg	RSo
CB	40	Hayden Ellinger	Fr
LB	41	Khali Saunders	RSo
LB	42	Clyde Washington	So
LB	43	Kieren Douglas	RSr
DE	44	Kydran Jenkins	Fr
DE	45	Byron Hubbard II	RJr
LB	46	Ben Furtney	Fr
DT	47	Jeff Marks	RJr
DE	48	Tristan Cox	Fr
S	49	Zane Greene	RJr
DE	50	Sulaiman Kpaka	RSo
LB	54	Ben Kreul	Fr
DE	56	Khordae Sydnor	Fr
DT	58	Branson Deen	RJr
DT	90	Lawrence Johnson	RJr
DE	91	Dontay Hunter II	RSo
DT	92	Bryce Austin	Fr
DT	93	PrinceJames Boyd Jr	Fr
LB	94	Robert McWilliams III	RSr
DE	95	Joe Anderson	So
LB	97	Semisi Fakasiieiki (injured)	Sr
DT	98	Greg Hudgins III	Fr
DE	99	Jack Sullivan	RJr

Special teams

Pos.	#	Name	Class
K	24	Mitchell Fineran	GS
P	28	Zac Collins	RSr
P	30	Jack Ansell	Fr
LS	31	Nick Zecchino	RSr
K	39	Ben Freehill	So
K	41	Caleb Krockover	Fr
P	47	Brendan Cropsey	Fr
LS	51	Nick Taylor	Fr
K	57	Chris Van Eekeren	RSo
K	84	Edward Dellinger	Fr
LS	96	Hunter MacDonald	RSo

Head coach

- Jeff Brohm

Coordinators/assistant coaches

- Marty Biagi (Special Teams Coordinator / Defensive Assistant)
- Brian Brohm (Co-Offensive Coordinator / Quarterbacks)
- Brad Lambert (Co-Defensive Coordinator / Linebackers)
- Ron English (Co-Defensive Coordinator / Secondary)
- Mark Hagen (Co-Defensive Coordinator / Defensive Line)
- JaMarcus Shephard (Co-Offensive Coordinator / Wide Receivers)
- James Adams (Cornerbacks)
- Chris Barclay (Running Backs)
- Neil Callaway (Assistant Offensive Line)
- Dale Williams (Offensive Line / Tight Ends)
- Ryan Wallace (Offense / Special Teams Assistant)
- Greg Brohm (Executive Director of Football Administration and Operations / Chief of Staff)
- JMichael Jonard (Quality Control)
- Domenic Reno (Director of Football Strength & Conditioning)

Legend

- (C) Team captain
- (S) Suspended
- (I) Ineligible
- Injured
- Redshirt

Roster
Last update: November 1, 2021

== Awards and honors ==
=== Award watch lists ===
Listed in the order that they were released

Award	Player	Position	Year	Date Awarded	Ref
Chuck Bednarik Award	George Karlaftis	DE	JR	July 19, 2021	
Maxwell Award	David Bell	WR	JR	July 19, 2021	
Fred Biletnikoff Award	David Bell	WR	JR	July 22, 2021	
Bronko Nagurski Trophy	George Karlaftis	DE	JR	July 27, 2021	

=== Weekly Awards ===
Weekly Awards
Player	Award	Date Awarded	Ref.
David Bell	Big Ten Offensive Player of the Week	October 18, 2021	
Cam Allen	Big Ten Defensive Player of the Week	October 18, 2021	
Jeff Brohm	Dodd Trophy Coach of the Week	October 19, 2021	
David Bell	Maxwell Award Player of the Week	October 19, 2021	
Aidan O'Connell	Davey O'Brien National Quarterback of the Week	October 19, 2021	
Jalen Graham	Big Ten Defensive Player of the Week	November 1, 2021	
Aidan O’Connell	Big Ten Co-Offensive Player of the Week	November 8, 2021	

=== All-Conference Honors ===
All-Conference Honors
Player	Position	Coaches	Media	AP
David Bell	WR	1st Team	1st Team	
George Karlaftis	DE	1st Team	1st Team	
Aidan O'Connell	QB	2nd Team	2nd Team	
Payne Durham	TE	HM		
Gus Hartwig	OL		HM	
Greg Long	OL	HM		
Tyler Witt	OL	HM	HM	
Milton Wright	WR	HM	HM	
Jaylan Alexander	LB	HM	HM	
Cam Allen	S	HM	HM	
Branson Deen	DT	HM	HM	
Jalen Graham	LB	HM	HM	
Dedrick Mackey	CB	HM		
Mitchell Fineran	K	HM	HM	

=== All-American Honors ===
NCAA Recognized All-American Honors
Player	Position	AFCA	AP	FWAA	WCFF	TSN
David Bell	WR	1st Team	1st Team	1st Team	1st Team	2nd Team
George Karlaftis	DL	1st Team	3rd Team		2nd Team	2nd Team

== Rankings ==
Ranking movements Legend: ██ Increase in ranking ██ Decrease in ranking — = Not ranked RV = Received votes
	Week															
Poll	Pre	1	2	3	4	5	6	7	8	9	10	11	12	13	14	Final
AP	—	—	—	—	—	—	—	25	—	—	RV	RV	RV	RV	RV	RV
Coaches	—	—	—	—	—	—	—	RV	—	—	RV	RV	RV	RV	RV	RV
CFP	Not released									—	19	—	—	—	—	Not released

== Season summary ==
=== Oregon State ===
Oregon State Beavers (0–0) at Purdue Boilermakers (0–0)

Quarter	1	2	3	4	Total
Oregon St	7	0	0	14	21
Purdue	7	6	3	14	30

at Ross–Ade Stadium, West Lafayette, Indiana

- Date: September 4, 2021
- Game time: 7:15 p.m. CDT
- Game weather: Sunny, 68 °F (20 °C)
- Game attendance: 53,656
- Referee: Mark Kluczynski
- TV announcers (FS1): Cory Provus and Robert Smith
- Box Score

Game information

First quarter

- OSU – B. J. Baylor 9-yard run (Everett Hayes kick), 10:10. Oregon St 7–0. Drive: 3 plays, 64 yards, 1:05.
- PUR – Zander Horvath 11-yard run (Mitchell Finneran kick), 3:43. Tie 7–7. Drive: 4 plays, 45 yards, 1:45.

Second quarter

- PUR – Mitchell Finneran 49-yard field goal, 8:19. Purdue 10–7. Drive: 8 plays, 47 yards, 3:24.
- PUR – Mitchell Finneran 40-yard field goal, 0:06. Purdue 13–7. Drive: 10 plays, 32 yards, 2:14.

Third quarter

- PUR – Mitchell Finneran 23-yard field goal, 1:19. Purdue 16–7. Drive: 10 plays, 42 yards, 5:41.

Fourth quarter

- OSU – Tyjon Lindsay 7-yard run (Everett Hayes kick), 13:05. Purdue 16–14. Drive: 7 plays, 75 yards, 3:14.
- PUR – Payne Durham 5-yard pass from Jack Plummer (Mitchell Finneran kick), 4:56. Purdue 23–14. Drive: 6 plays, 37 yards, 3:20.
- OSU – B.J. Baylor 2-yard run (Everett Hayes kick), 3:13. Purdue 23–21. Drive: 7 plays, 75 yards, 1:43.
- PUR – Payne Durham 50-yard pass from Jack Plummer (Mitchell Finneran kick), 2:09. Purdue 30–21. Drive: 4 plays, 75 yards, 1:04.

Top passers

- OSU – Chance Nolan – 10/16, 157 yards
- PUR – Jack Plummer – 29/41, 313 yards, 2 TD

Top rushers

- OSU – Trey Lowe – 6 rushes, 27 yards
- PUR – Zander Horvath – 21 rushes, 81 yards, TD

Top receivers

- OSU – Trevon Bradford – 5 receptions, 75 yards
- PUR – David Bell – 8 receptions, 134 yards

=== Illinois ===
Illinois Fighting Illini (1–3) at Purdue Boilermakers (2–1) – Game summary

Quarter	1	2	3	4	Total
Fighting Illini	0	3	3	3	9
Boilermakers	6	0	0	7	13

at Ross–Ade Stadium, West Lafayette, Indiana

- Date: September 25
- Game time: 3:30 p.m. EDT
- Game weather: Sunny
- Game attendance: 52,840
- Referee: John O'Neill
- TV: BTN
- Box score, Recap

Game information
First quarter
- PUR – Mitchell Fineran 23-yard field goal, 8:31. Boilermakers 3–0. Drive: 15 plays, 69 yards, 6:29.
- PUR – Mitchell Fineran 30-yard field goal, 3:34. Boilermakers 6–0. Drive: 6 plays, 34 yards, 2:57.

Second quarter

- ILL – James McCourt 51-yard field goal, 2:24. Boilermakers 6–3. Drive: 7 plays, 29 yards, 3:40.

Third quarter

- ILL – James McCourt 35-yard field goal, 8:18. Tied 6–6. Drive: 13 plays, 58 yards, 6:42.

Fourth quarter

- ILL – James McCourt 45-yard field goal, 14:51. Fighting Illini 9–6. Drive: 6 plays, 53 yards, 1:39.
- PUR – TJ Sheffield 14-yard pass from Aidan O'Connell (Mitchell Fineran kick), 5:44. Boilermakers 13–9. Drive: 10 plays, 94 yards, 3:42.

Statistics	ILL	PUR
First downs	17	17
Total yards	275	315
Rushes–yards	42–175	26–38
Passing yards	100	277
Passing: Comp–Att–Int	14–27–0	24–40–2
Time of possession	33:45	26:15

Team	Category	Player	Statistics
Illinois	Passing	Brandon Peters	14/26, 100 yards
Illinois	Rushing	Josh McCray	24 rushes, 156 yards
Illinois	Receiving	Casey Washington	3 receptions, 31 yards
Purdue	Passing	Aidan O'Connell	12/19, 182 yards, TD, 2 INT
Purdue	Rushing	Dylan Downing	10 rushes, 39 yards
Purdue	Receiving	Milton Wright	7 receptions, 88 yards

500th game at Ross-Ade Stadium

=== Wisconsin ===
Wisconsin vs Purdue – Game summary

Quarter	1	2	3	4	Total
Badgers	7	6	7	10	30
No. 25 Boilermakers	0	13	0	0	13

at Ross–Ade Stadium, West Lafayette, Indiana

- Date: October 23, 2021
- Game time: 2:00 p.m.
- Game weather: Sunny
- Game attendance: 61,320
- Referee: Ron Snodgrass
- TV announcers (BTN): Brandon Gaudin (play-by-play) and Matt Millen (analyst)

Game information

First quarter

- WISC – Braelon Allen 4-yard TD run, (Collin Larsh kick), 2:49. Wisconsin 7–0. Drive: 13 plays, 92 yards, 7:37.

Second quarter

- PUR – Payne Durham 10-yard pass from Aidan O'Connell (Mitchell Fineran kick), 14:16. Tie 7–7. Drive: 4 plays, 39 yards, 1:47.
- WISC – Collin Larsh 37-yard field goal, 8:54. Wisconsin 10–7. Drive: 10 plays, 56 yards, 5:22.
- PUR – George Karlaftis 56-yard fumble return (Mitchell Fineran kick missed), 6:13. Purdue 13–10. Drive: 3 plays, -8 yards, 1:32.
- WISC – Collin Larsh 23-yard field goal, 2:06. Tie 13–13. Drive: 4 plays, -3 yards, 0:56.

Third quarter

- WISC – Chez Mellusi 20-yard TD run, (Collin Larsh kick), 6:06. Wisconsin 20–13. Drive: 3 plays, 94 yards, 1:01.

Fourth quarter

- WISC – Braelon Allen 14-yard TD run, (Collin Larsh kick), 10:13. Wisconsin 27–13. Drive: 6 plays, 72 yards, 2:55.
- WISC – Collin Larsh 43-yard field goal, 4:06. Wisconsin 30–13. Drive: 4 plays, -4 yards, 2:32.

Top passers

- PUR – Aidan O'Connell – 24/32, 200 yards, TD, 3 INT
- WISC – Graham Mertz – 5/8, 52 yards

Top rushers

- PUR – King Doerue – 9 rushes, 20 yards
- WISC – Chaz Mellusi – 27 rushes, 149 yards, TD

Top receivers

- PUR – Payne Durham – 9 receptions, 112 yards, TD
- WISC – Jake Ferguson – 2 receptions, 23 yards

Top defenders

- PUR – Jaylan Alexander – 15 tackles, TFL, forced fumble
- WISC – Leo Chenal – 9 tackles, 5.5 TFL, 3.5 sacks

=== Michigan State ===
Week Ten: No. 3 Michigan State at Purdue – Game summary

Quarter	1	2	3	4	Total
No. 3 Michigan State	7	7	7	8	29
Purdue	7	14	10	9	40

at Ross–Ade Stadium, West Lafayette, IN

- Date: November 6, 2021
- Game time: 3:41 p.m. EDT
- Game weather: Sunny
- Game attendance: 57,748
- Referee: Larry Smith
- TV announcers (ABC): Dave Pasch (play-by-play), Dusty Dvoracek (analyst), Tom Luginbill (sideline)
- Source

Game information

First Quarter

- (09:12) PUR TD: David Bell 5-yard pass from Aidan O'Connell (Mitchell Fineran kick)
  PUR 7–0; 9 plays, 52 yards, 3:37
- (06:23) MSU TD: Tre Mosley 26-yard pass from Payton Thorne (Stephen Rusnak kick)
  TIED 7–7; 6 plays, 75 yards, 2:40

Second Quarter

- (13:23) PUR TD: Broc Thopson 8-yard pass from Aidan O'Connell (Mitchell Fineran kick)
  PUR 14–7; 8 plays 70 yards, 3:28
- (04:50) PUR TD: Jackson Anthrop 39-yard pass from Aidan O'Connell (Mitchell Fineran kick)
  PUR 21–7; 4 plays, 51 yards, 1:13
- (01:04) MSU TD: Kenneth Walker III 14-yard run (Stephen Rusnak kick)
  PUR 21–14; 11 plays, 69 yards, 3:41

Third Quarter

- (12:19) MSU TD: Payton Thorne 32-yard run (Stephen Rusnak kick)
  TIED 21–21; 3 plays, 41 yards, 1:00
- (09:31) PUR TD: King Doerue 1-yard run (Mitchell Fineran kick)
  PUR 28–21; 7 plays, 70 yards, 2:44
- (06:31) PUR FG: Mitchell Fineran 29-yard field goal
  PUR 31–21; 7 plays, 51 yards, 1:32

Fourth Quarter

- (13:02) PUR FG: Mitchell Fineran 24-yard field goal
  PUR 34–21; 14 plays, 60 yards, 7:14
- (06:48) PUR FG: Mitchell Fineran 23-yard field goal
  PUR 37–21; 9 plays, 93 yards, 2:24
- (05:03) MSU TD: Tre Mosley 11-yard pass from Payton Thorne (Maliq Carr pass)
  PUR 37–29; 5 plays, 83 yards, 1:45
- (00:41) PUR FG: Mitchell Fineran 22-yard field goal
  PUR 40–29; 10 plays, 76 yards, 4:17

Passing

- MSU – Payton Thorne: 20/30, 276 yards, 2 TD, 1 INT
- PUR – Aidan O'Connell: 40/54, 536 yards, 3TD

Rushing

- MSU – Kenneth Walker III: 23 carries, 152 yards, 1 TD
- PUR – King Doerue: 13 carries, 33 yards, 1 TD

Receiving

- MSU – Jayden Reed: 4 receptions, 73 yards
- PUR – David Bell: 11 receptions, 217 yards, 1 TD

External videos
- Jim Everett pregame speech
- Game highlights (Big Ten Network)
