= 2019 Purdue Boilermakers football team =

American college football season

2019 Purdue Boilermakers football
- Conference: Big Ten Conference
- West Division
- Record: 4–8 (3–6 Big Ten)
- Head coach: Jeff Brohm (3rd season)
- Co-offensive coordinators: Brian Brohm (3rd season); JaMarcus Shephard (2nd season)
- Offensive scheme: Spread
- Co-defensive coordinators: Nick Holt (3rd season); Anthony Poindexter (3rd season)
- Base defense: 4–3
- Home stadium: Ross–Ade Stadium

Uniform
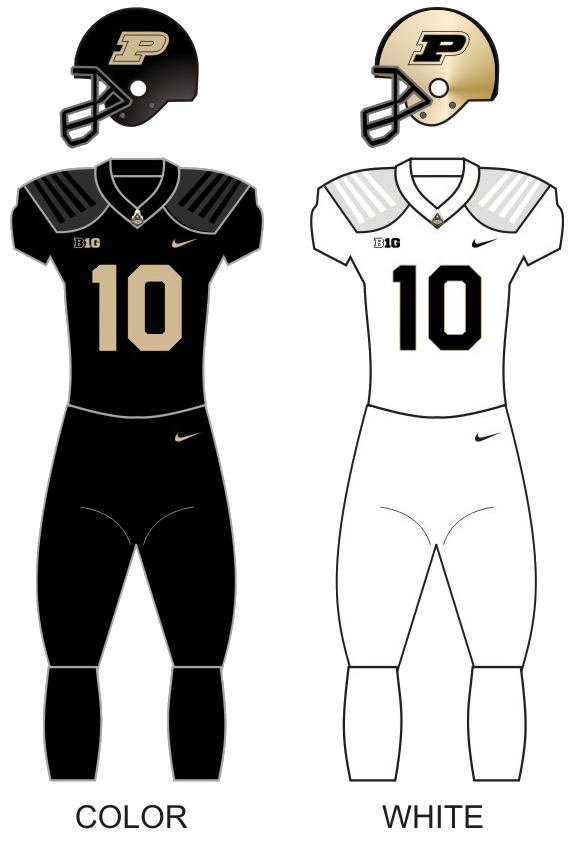

2019 Big Ten Conference football standings
	Conf.			Overall
Team	W		L	W		L
East Division
No. 3 Ohio State xy$^	9	–	0	13	–	1
No. 9 Penn State	7	–	2	11	–	2
No. 18 Michigan	6	–	3	9	–	4
Indiana	5	–	4	8	–	5
Michigan State	4	–	5	7	–	6
Maryland	1	–	8	3	–	9
Rutgers	0	–	9	2	–	10
West Division
No. 11 Wisconsin xy	7	–	2	10	–	4
No. 10 Minnesota x	7	–	2	11	–	2
No. 15 Iowa	6	–	3	10	–	3
Illinois	4	–	5	6	–	7
Purdue	3	–	6	4	–	8
Nebraska	3	–	6	5	–	7
Northwestern	1	–	8	3	–	9
Championship: Ohio State 34, Wisconsin 21
^ – College Football Playoff participant; $ – Conference champion; x – Division champion/co-champions; y – Championship game participant; Rankings from AP Poll

The 2019 Purdue Boilermakers football team represented Purdue University during the 2019 NCAA Division I FBS football season. The Boilermakers played their home games at Ross–Ade Stadium in West Lafayette, Indiana and competed in the West Division of the Big Ten Conference. They were led by third-year head coach Jeff Brohm. They finished the season 4–8, 3–6 in Big Ten play to finish in a tie for fifth place in the West Division.

== Preseason ==
=== Coaching changes ===
Purdue cornerbacks coach Derrick Jackson and tight ends coach Mark Tommerdahl both left to take jobs at Northern Illinois and Texas Tech respectively in early February 2019. Purdue announced the hiring of Greg Brown as cornerbacks coach on February 21. He previously was the secondary coach at Auburn for two seasons. Head coach Jeff Brohm also announced the promotion of former Purdue quality control assistant Ryan Wallace to be the new tight ends coach.

=== Player news ===
Wide receiver KeyRon Catlett announced his decision to transfer to Hampton. Tight end Jess Trussell and offensive lineman Michael Mendez announced that they would leave as graduate transfers. Linebacker Tobias Larry transferred to Tennessee State. Benaiah Franklin transferred to Northwestern State.

=== Recruiting ===
The Boilermakers signed a total of 24 recruits.

College recruiting (2019)
Name	Hometown	School	Height	Weight	Commit date
George Karlaftis; DE	West Lafayette, Indiana	West Lafayette High School	6 ft 4 in (1.93 m)	260 lb (120 kg)	Oct 21, 2017
George Karlaftis; DE	Recruit ratings: Rivals: 247Sports: ESPN:				
Mershawn Rice; ATH	Reynoldsburg, Ohio	Reynoldsburg High School	6 ft 2 in (1.88 m)	184 lb (83 kg)	May 18, 2018
Mershawn Rice; ATH	Recruit ratings: Rivals: 247Sports: ESPN:				
Da'Joun Hewitt; RB	Nashville, Tennessee	Davidson Academy	5 ft 11 in (1.80 m)	190 lb (86 kg)	May 22, 2018
Da'Joun Hewitt; RB	Recruit ratings: Rivals: 247Sports: ESPN:				
Marvin Grant; DB	Detroit, Michigan	Martin Luther King High School	6 ft 2 in (1.88 m)	190 lb (86 kg)	Jun 1, 2018
Marvin Grant; DB	Recruit ratings: Rivals: 247Sports: ESPN:				
Cam Craig; OL	Dublin, Ohio	Jerome High School	6 ft 5 in (1.96 m)	265 lb (120 kg)	Jun 3, 2018
Cam Craig; OL	Recruit ratings: Rivals: 247Sports: ESPN:				
Paul Piferi; QB	Villa Park, California	Villa Park High School	6 ft 5 in (1.96 m)	210 lb (95 kg)	Jun 11, 2018
Paul Piferi; QB	Recruit ratings: Rivals: 247Sports: ESPN:				
Kyle Bilodeau; TE	Woodberry Forest, Virginia	Woodberry Forest School	6 ft 6 in (1.98 m)	240 lb (110 kg)	Jun 15, 2018
Kyle Bilodeau; TE	Recruit ratings: Rivals: 247Sports: ESPN:				
Dave Monnot III; OL	Joliet, Illinois	Joliet Catholic Academy	6 ft 6 in (1.98 m)	285 lb (129 kg)	Jun 15, 2018
Dave Monnot III; OL	Recruit ratings: Rivals: 247Sports: ESPN:				
Spencer Holstege; OL	Grand Rapids, Michigan	South Christian High School	6 ft 5 in (1.96 m)	275 lb (125 kg)	Jun 15, 2018
Spencer Holstege; OL	Recruit ratings: Rivals: 247Sports: ESPN:				
Dontay Hunter; DE	Westerville, Ohio	Westerville Central High School	6 ft 4 in (1.93 m)	239 lb (108 kg)	Jun 17, 2018
Dontay Hunter; DE	Recruit ratings: Rivals: 247Sports: ESPN:				
Brooks Cormier; K	Tuscaloosa, Alabama	American Christian Academy	6 ft 5 in (1.96 m)	215 lb (98 kg)	Jun 27, 2018
Brooks Cormier; K	Recruit ratings: Rivals: 247Sports: ESPN:				
Crishawn Long; LB	Parma, Ohio	Padua Franciscan High School	6 ft 2 in (1.88 m)	190 lb (86 kg)	Jun 18, 2018
Crishawn Long; LB	Recruit ratings: Rivals: 247Sports: ESPN:				
Nyles Beverly; DB	Macedonia, Ohio	Nordonia High School	6 ft 0 in (1.83 m)	185 lb (84 kg)	Jun 19, 2018
Nyles Beverly; DB	Recruit ratings: Rivals: 247Sports: ESPN:				
Cameron Allen; DB	Bluefield, Virginia	Graham High School	6 ft 1 in (1.85 m)	185 lb (84 kg)	Jun 21, 2018
Cameron Allen; DB	Recruit ratings: Rivals: 247Sports: ESPN:				
Garrett Miller; TE	Round Rock, Texas	Round Rock High School	6 ft 5 in (1.96 m)	227 lb (103 kg)	Jun 22, 2018
Garrett Miller; TE	Recruit ratings: Rivals: 247Sports: ESPN:				
Sulaiman Kpaka; DE	Grand Prairie, Texas	Grand Prairie High School	6 ft 3 in (1.91 m)	250 lb (110 kg)	Jun 22, 2018
Sulaiman Kpaka; DE	Recruit ratings: Rivals: 247Sports: ESPN:				
Steven Faucheux; DT	West Chester, Ohio	Lakota West High School	6 ft 4 in (1.93 m)	269 lb (122 kg)	Jul 30, 2018
Steven Faucheux; DT	Recruit ratings: Rivals: 247Sports: ESPN:				
TJ Sheffield; WR	Thompsons Station, Tennessee	Independence High School	5 ft 10 in (1.78 m)	165 lb (75 kg)	Jul 30, 2018
TJ Sheffield; WR	Recruit ratings: Rivals: 247Sports: ESPN:				
King Doerue; RB	Amarillo, Texas	Tascosa High School	6 ft 0 in (1.83 m)	200 lb (91 kg)	Oct 10, 2018
King Doerue; RB	Recruit ratings: Rivals: 247Sports: ESPN:				
Kyle Jornigan; OL	Youngstown, Ohio	Cardinal Mooney High School	6 ft 4 in (1.93 m)	295 lb (134 kg)	Oct 18, 2018
Kyle Jornigan; OL	Recruit ratings: Rivals: 247Sports: ESPN:				
Jalen Graham; DB	Detroit, Michigan	Cass Technical High School	6 ft 2 in (1.88 m)	204 lb (93 kg)	Oct 20, 2018
Jalen Graham; DB	Recruit ratings: Rivals: 247Sports: ESPN:				
Milton Wright; WR	Louisville, Kentucky	Christian Academy of Louisville	6 ft 3 in (1.91 m)	190 lb (86 kg)	Nov 9, 2018
Milton Wright; WR	Recruit ratings: Rivals: 247Sports: ESPN:				
Khali Saunders; LB	Elmhurst, Illinois	Immaculate Conception	6 ft 4 in (1.93 m)	210 lb (95 kg)	Dec 20, 2018
Khali Saunders; LB	Recruit ratings: Rivals: 247Sports: ESPN:				
David Bell; WR	Indianapolis, Indiana	Warren Central High School	6 ft 2 in (1.88 m)	180 lb (82 kg)	Jan 5, 2019
David Bell; WR	Recruit ratings: Rivals: 247Sports: ESPN:				
Overall recruit ranking: Rivals: 26 247Sports: 25 ESPN: 25
Note: In many cases, Scout, Rivals, 247Sports, On3, and ESPN may conflict in their listings of height and weight.; In these cases, the average was taken. ESPN grades are on a 100-point scale.; Sources: "2019 Purdue Football Commitment List". Rivals.; "2019 Recruiting Class". ESPN.; "2019 Team Ranking". Rivals.com.

=== Award watch lists ===
Listed in the order that they were released

Award	Player	Position	Year
Lott IMPACT Trophy	Markus Bailey	LB	RSr
Robert Maxwell Award	Rondale Moore	WR	So
Chuck Bednarik Award	Markus Bailey	LB	RSr
Fred Biletnikoff Award	Rondale Moore	WR	So
John Mackey Award	Brycen Hopkins	TE	RSr
Dick Butkus Award	Markus Bailey	LB	RSr
Outland Trophy	Lorenzo Neal	DT	Sr
Paul Hornung Award	Rondale Moore	WR	So
Bronko Nagurski Trophy	Markus Bailey	LB	RSr

=== Preseason Big Ten poll ===
Although the Big Ten Conference has not held an official preseason poll since 2010, Cleveland.com has polled sports journalists representing all member schools as a de facto preseason media poll since 2011. For the 2019 poll, Purdue was projected to finish in fifth in the West Division.

== Schedule ==
Purdue's 2019 schedule would begin with three non-conference games, first on the road against Nevada of the Mountain West Conference, and then returning home for games against Vanderbilt of the Southeastern Conference (SEC) and TCU of the Big 12 Conference. In Big Ten Conference play, Purdue would play all other members of the West Division and draws Penn State, Maryland, and Indiana from the East Division.

Date	Time	Opponent	Site	TV	Result	Attendance
August 30	9:30 p.m.	at Nevada*	Mackay Stadium; Reno, NV	CBSSN	L 31–34	20,144
September 7	12:00 p.m.	Vanderbilt*	Ross–Ade Stadium; West Lafayette, IN	BTN	W 42–24	50,506
September 14	7:30 p.m.	TCU*	Ross–Ade Stadium; West Lafayette, IN	BTN	L 13–34	60,037
September 28	3:30 p.m.	Minnesota	Ross–Ade Stadium; West Lafayette, IN	ESPN2	L 31–38	50,629
October 5	12:00 p.m.	at No. 12 Penn State	Beaver Stadium; University Park, PA	ESPN	L 7–35	106,536
October 12	12:00 p.m.	Maryland^{†}	Ross–Ade Stadium; West Lafayette, IN	BTN	W 40–14	52,296
October 19	12:00 p.m.	at No. 23 Iowa	Kinnick Stadium; Iowa City, IA	ESPN2	L 20–26	69,250
October 26	12:00 p.m.	Illinois	Ross–Ade Stadium; West Lafayette, IN (Purdue Cannon)	BTN	L 6–24	58,735
November 2	12:00 p.m.	Nebraska	Ross–Ade Stadium; West Lafayette, IN	FOX	W 31–27	50,606
November 9	12:00 p.m.	at Northwestern	Ryan Field; Evanston, IL	BTN	W 24–22	37,194
November 23	4:00 p.m.	at No. 12 Wisconsin	Camp Randall Stadium; Madison, WI	FOX	L 24–45	70,747
November 30	12:00 p.m.	Indiana	Ross–Ade Stadium; West Lafayette, IN (Old Oaken Bucket)	ESPN2	L 41–44 ^{2OT}	55,338
*Non-conference game; ^{†}Homecoming; Rankings from AP Poll and CFP Rankings (after November 5) released prior to game; All times are in Eastern time

== Roster ==
2019 Purdue Boilermakers football team roster
Players
Coaches
Offense

Pos.	#	Name	Class
QB	2	Elijah Sindelar (injured) (C)	Sr
WR	3	David Bell	Fr
WR	4	Rondale Moore (injured)	So
RB	5	Da'Joun Hewitt	Fr
QB	7	Nick Sipe	So
WR	8	T. J. Sheffield (injured)	Fr
WR	9	Mershawn Rice	Fr
WR	10	Amad Anderson	Fr
WR	12	Jared Sparks	Jr
QB	13	Jack Plummer (injured)	Fr
QB	14	Danny Carollo	Jr
WR	15	Kory Taylor	Fr
QB	16	Aidan O'Connell	So
WR	17	Milton Wright	Fr
QB	18	Paul Piferi	Fr
RB	20	Alfred Armour	Fr
WR	21	Jordan Bonner	Fr
RB	22	King Doerue	Fr
RB	25	Tario Fuller	Sr
WR	33	Jackson Anthrop	Jr
RB	34	Richie Worship	Sr
RB	40	Zander Horvath	So
TE	48	Kyle Bilodeau	Fr
OL	51	Bryce Brown	Jr
OL	56	Viktor Beach (injured)	So
OL	58	Jimmy McKenna	Fr
OL	59	Dave Monnot III	Fr
OL	61	Ryan Flaherty	Jr
OL	65	Marc Rolland	So
OL	66	Alex Criddle	Sr
OL	68	Cam Craig	Fr
OL	70	Will Bramel	Fr
OL	71	Sam Loebig	Jr
OL	72	Sam Garvin	So
OL	73	Kyle Jornigan	Fr
OL	74	Eric Miller	Fr
OL	75	Spencer Holstege	Fr
OL	76	Mark Stickford	So
OL	77	D. J. Washington (injured)	So
OL	78	Grant Hermanns (C)	Jr
OL	79	Matt McCann	Sr
WR	80	Camdyn Childers	Fr
WR	82	Grant Summers	Fr
WR	83	Malcolm Dotson	Sr
WR	84	Noah Ellison	So
TE	87	Payne Durham	Fr
TE	88	Garrett Miller	Fr
TE	89	Brycen Hopkins (C)	RSr

Defense

Pos.	#	Name	Class
CB	1	Dedrick Mackey	So
CB	2	Kenneth Major	So
DE	5	George Karlaftis	Fr
S	6	Jalen Graham	Fr
CB	7	Jordan Rucker	Fr
DT	8	Anthony Watts	Jr
DT	9	Lorenzo Neal (injured) (C)	Sr
DB	11	Kadin Smith	Fr
DE	12	Dontay Hunter II	Fr
CB	13	Tyler Hamilton	So
CB	17	Byron Perkins	Fr
CB	18	Cam Allen	Fr
LB	21	Markus Bailey (injured) (C)	Sr
S	23	Cory Trice	Fr
DB	24	Nyles Beverly	Fr
LB	26	Crishawn Long	Fr
S	26	Marvin Grant (injured)	Fr
S	27	Navon Mosley (C)	Sr
CB	29	Simeon Smiley	Jr
LB	32	Elijah Ball	Fr
LB	34	Jonah Williams	So
LB	35	Jack Smith	Fr
LB	36	Jaylan Alexander	So
LB	37	Jacob Wahlberg	Fr
S	38	Brennan Thieneman	Jr
LB	39	Zach Randall	So
S	40	Ashton Nichols	Fr
CB	42	David Day	Sr
LB	43	Kieren Douglas	So
LB	44	Ben Holt	Sr
LB	45	Byron Hubbard	Fr
LB	46	Cornell Jones	Jr
DL	47	Jeff Marks	So
S	49	Zane Greene	Fr
DE	50	Solomon Kpaka	Fr
DE	52	Willie Lane	Fr
DE	55	Derrick Barnes	Jr
LB	57	Will Chapman	Fr
DL	58	Branson Deen	Fr
DL	59	K. J. Stokes	Fr
LB	81	Khali Saunders	Fr
DL	90	Lawrence Johnson	Fr
DE	92	Giovanni Reviere	So
DT	93	Steven Faucheux	Fr
DE	94	Robert McWilliams III	So
DE	95	Jack Cravaack	Fr
DE	97	Semisi Fakasiieiki	Jr
DE	98	Kai Higgins	Sr
DL	99	Jack Sullivan	Fr

Special teams

Pos.	#	Name	Class
P	19	Brooks Cormier	Fr
LS	30	Brooks Royal	So
LS	31	Nick Zecchino	Jr
K	37	Chris Van Eekeren	Fr
P	38	Zac Collins	So
K	85	J. D. Dellinger	Jr
LS	86	Hunter MacDonald	Fr
LS	96	August Schott	Fr

Head coach

- Jeff Brohm

Coordinators/assistant coaches

- Brian Brohm (Co-Offensive Coordinator / Quarterbacks)
- Nick Holt (Co-Defensive Coordinator / Linebackers)
- Anthony Poindexter (Co-Defensive Coordinator / Secondary)
- JaMarcus Shephard (Co-Offensive Coordinator / Wide Receivers)
- Chris Barclay (Running Backs)
- Greg Brown (Cornerbacks)
- Reggie Johnson (Defensive Line)
- Dale Williams (Offensive Line)
- Kevin Wolthausen (Special Teams Coordinator / Assistant Defensive Line)
- JMichael Jonard (Quality Control)
- Dan Rowe (Quality Control)
- Ryan Wallace (Tight Ends)
- Justin Lovett (Director of Strength & Conditioning)
- Domenic Reno (Senior Associate Director of Football
  Strength & Conditioning)
- Dennis Love (Associate Director of Football
  Strength & Conditioning)
- Ryan Grubbs (Assistant Director of Football
  Strength & Conditioning)
- Mitch Meador (Assistant Director of Football
  Strength & Conditioning)

Legend

- (C) Team captain
- (S) Suspended
- (I) Ineligible
- Injured
- Redshirt

Roster
Last update: November 19, 2019

== Game summaries ==
=== Nevada ===
Purdue at Nevada

Team	1	2	3	4	Total
Boilermakers	10	14	7	0	31
• Wolf Pack	0	7	10	17	34

- Date: August 30
- Location: Mackay Stadium
  Reno, NV
- Game start: 6:33 p.m. PDT
- Elapsed time: 3:58
- Game attendance: 20,144
- Game weather: 86 °F (30 °C), Sunny, WNW 10 mph (16 km/h)
- Referee: Kevin Hassell
- TV announcers (CBSSN): Dave Ryan (Play-By-Play) & Corey Chavous (Analyst)

Scoring summary
1	9:37	PUR	Brycen Hopkins 2-yard pass from Elijah Sindelar (J. D. Dellinger kick)	PUR 7–0
1	2:05	PUR	J. D. Dellinger 32-yard field goal	PUR 10–0
2	4:43	NEV	Dominic Christian 38-yard pass from Carson Strong (Brandon Talton kick)	PUR 10–7
2	3:15	PUR	Jackson Anthrop 38-yard pass from Elijah Sindelar (J. D. Dellinger kick)	PUR 17–7
2	:27	PUR	Rondale Moore 39-yard pass from Elijah Sindelar (J. D. Dellinger kick)	PUR 24–7
3	6:49	NEV	Elijah Cooks 21-yard pass from Carson Strong (Brandon Talton kick)	PUR 24–14
3	6:19	PUR	David Bell 49-yard pass from Elijah Sindelar (J. D. Dellinger kick)	PUR 31–14
3	3:21	NEV	Brandon Talton 34-yard field goal	PUR 31–17
4	6:56	NEV	Toa Taua 7-yard run (Brandon Talton kick)	PUR 31–24
4	0:52	NEV	Elijah Cooks 20-yard pass from Carson Strong (Brandon Talton kick)	TIE 31–31
4	:00	NEV	Brandon Talton 56-yard field goal	NEV 34–31

To begin the season, Purdue traveled to Nevada, the first time Purdue has played in Reno.

Purdue lost to Nevada, 34–31. Purdue scored the first 10 points in the first quarter via 2-yard touchdown pass from Elijah Sindelar to Brycen Hopkins and a 32-yard field goal by J. D. Dellinger. Nevada responded with points in the second quarter via a 38-yard touchdown pass from Carson Strong to Dominic Christian. Purdue extended its lead in the second quarter via a 38-yard touchdown reception by Jackson Anthrop and a 39-yard touchdown reception by Rondale Moore, both passes coming from Sindelar. Purdue two touchdowns made the score 24–7 in favor of Purdue at half-time. Nevada added a 21-yard touchdown reception by Elijah Cooks in the third quarter. Purdue responded just 30 seconds later with a 49-yard touchdown reception by David Bellfrom Sindelar. Nevada closed out the third quarter scoring following a 34-yard field goal from Talton in the third quarter. Nevada reduced Purdue's lead to seven points with just 6:56 remaining following a 7-yard touchdown run from Toa Taua. Following a Purdue punt, Nevada drove 87-yards with the final play being a 21-yard Elijah Cooks touchdown reception from Strong to tie the game with :52 remaining. On Purdue's second play of their final possession, Sindelar was intercepted by Daniel Brown. Talton was then able to connect on a 56-yard field goal as time expired to give Nevada their first lead of the game, and a victory.

Purdue was minus-5 in turnover margin, just the third time since 2000 that Purdue had five or more turnovers while its opponent had zero. Purdue's 519 yards of offense were the fifth most in a loss since the 2000 season.

=== Vanderbilt ===
Vanderbilt at Purdue

Team	1	2	3	4	Total
Commodores	7	3	0	14	24
• Boilermakers	7	7	14	14	42

- Date: September 7
- Location: Ross–Ade Stadium
  West Lafayette, IN
- Game start: 12:01 p.m. EDT
- Elapsed time: 3:30
- Game attendance: 50,506
- Game weather: 69 °F (21 °C), Partly Cloudy, SE 5 mph (8.0 km/h)
- Referee: Mark Curles
- TV announcers (BTN): Kevin Kugler (Play-By-Play), Matt Millen (Analyst) & Rick Pizzo (Sideline)

Scoring summary
1	6:32	VAN	Ke'Shawn Vaughn 1-yard run (Ryley Guay kick)	VAN 7–0
1	3:57	PUR	Brycen Hopkins 12-yard pass from Elijah Sindelar (J. D. Dellinger kick)	TIE 7–7
2	4:56	PUR	Payne Durham 2-yard pass from Elijah Sindelar (J. D. Dellinger kick)	PUR 14–7
2	:53	VAN	Ryley Guay 48-yard field goal	PUR 14–10
3	13:13	PUR	Jared Sparks 50-yard pass from Elijah Sindelar (J. D. Dellinger kick)	PUR 21–10
3	5:06	PUR	Brycen Hopkins 20-yard pass from Elijah Sindelar (J. D. Dellinger kick)	PUR 28–10
4	12:27	VAN	Cam Johnson 10-yard pass from Riley Neal (two-point pass conversion failed)	PUR 28–16
4	9:27	PUR	Rondale Moore 34-yard pass from Elijah Sindelar (J. D. Dellinger kick)	PUR 25–16
4	9:16	VAN	Chris Pierce 75-yard pass from Riley Neal (Riley Neal pass to Kalija Lipscomb two-point conversion)	PUR 35–24
4	6:05	PUR	Elijah Sindelar 1-yard run (J. D. Dellinger kick)	PUR 42–24

After opening the season in Nevada, Purdue returned home for their second game against Vanderbilt. The two schools have not played each other since 1942.

Purdue defeated Vanderbilt, 42–24. Vanderbilt scored first in the first quarter via 1-yard touchdown run by Ke'Shawn Vaughn. Purdue responded with at 12-yard touchdown reception by Brycen Hopkins from Elijah Sindelar. Purdue took the lead in the second quarter via a 2-yard touchdown reception by Payne Durham from Sindelar. Vanderbilt added a 48-yard Ryley Guay field goal to make the score 14–10 in favor of Purdue at half-time. Purdue extended its lead on a 50-yard touchdown reception by Jared Sparks and a 20-yard touchdown by Hopkins in the third quarter. Vanderbilt responded with a 10-yard touchdown reception by Cam Johnson from Riley Neal, but failed to convert on the two-point conversion attempt, to open the fourth quarter scoring. Purdue responded with a 34-yard touchdown reception by Rondale Moore from Sindelar. Vanderbilt countered just 9 seconds later when Neal found Chris Pierce on a 75-yard touchdown pass, this time Neal's pass to Kalija Lipscomb was a successful two-point conversion. Purdue concluded the scoring on a 1-yard touchdown run with by Sindelar.

Sindelar's 509 yards passing tied for the sixth most in a game in school history. Purdue's 42 points were its most points ever scored against current members of the SEC. The following Monday, Elijah Sindelar was named the Big Ten Conference Offensive Player of the Week.

=== TCU ===
TCU at Purdue

Team	1	2	3	4	Total
• Horned Frogs	10	3	14	7	34
Boilermakers	3	3	0	7	13

- Date: September 14
- Location: Ross–Ade Stadium
  West Lafayette, IN
- Game start: 7:40 p.m. EDT
- Elapsed time: 3:10
- Game attendance: 60,037
- Game weather: 79 °F (26 °C), Clear, S 4 mph (6.4 km/h)
- Referee: Reggie Smith
- TV announcers (BTN): Kevin Kugler (play-by-play), Matt Millen (analyst), and Rick Pizzo (sideline)

Scoring summary
1	11:35	PUR	J. D. Dellinger 31-yard field goal	PUR 3–0
1	4:09	TCU	Jonathan Song 24-yard field goal	TIE 3–3
1	1:14	TCU	Darius Anderson 32-yard run (Jonathan Song kick)	TCU 10–3
2	12:35	PUR	J. D. Dellinger 53-yard field goal	TCU 10–6
2	1:09	TCU	Jonathan Song 40-yard field goal	TCU 13–6
3	8:12	TCU	Al'Dontre Davis 22-yard pass from Max Duggan (Jonathan Song kick)	TCU 20–6
3	1:24	TCU	Sewo Olonilua 1-yard run (Jonathan Song kick)	TCU 27–6
4	5:45	TCU	Darius Anderson 8-yard run (Jonathan Song kick)	TCU 34–6
4	3:40	PUR	Amad Anderson 54-yard pass from Jack Plummer (J. D. Dellinger kick)	TCU 34–13

After defeating Vanderbilt, Purdue remained at home for their third game against TCU. The two schools have not played each other since 1970.

TCU won in a blowout, 34–13. Purdue opened the scoring with a 31-yard field goal by J. D. Dellinger. TCU responded with a 24-yard field goal by Jonathan Song. Darius Anderson broke loose to score on a 32-yard run to finish the first quarter scoring. Purdue responded in the second quarter when Dellinger hit a 53-yard field goal. TCU would score again just before the half on a 40-yard Song field goal to make the score 13–6 in favor of TCU at halftime. TCU struck first in the second half when Max Duggan found Al'Dontre Davis for a 22-yard touchdown catch. TCU scored again on a 1-yard touchdown run by Sewo Olonilua to round out the 3rd quarter scoring. Anderson scored again for TCU on an 8-yard run to increase the lead in the 4th quarter. Purdue scored their first touchdown when Jack Plummer found Amad Anderson for a 54-yard touchdown pass.

Purdue's 23 yards rushing were its fewest since having 23 against Minnesota on November 5, 2016. Purdue's 8 first downs were its fewest since having eight against Wisconsin on October 31, 2009. Jack Plummer and Amad Anderson both go the first touchdowns of their careers when Plummer found Anderson for a 54-yard reception in the 4th quarter. J. D. Dellinger's 53-yard field goal was the third longest in school history. George Karlaftis became the first true freshman to record a sack and interception in the same game since Torri Williams on November 6, 2004.

=== Minnesota ===
Minnesota at Purdue

Team	1	2	3	4	Total
• Golden Gophers	14	14	10	0	38
Boilermakers	3	7	7	14	31

- Date: September 28
- Location: Ross–Ade Stadium
  West Lafayette, IN
- Game start: 3:35 p.m. EDT
- Elapsed time: 3:18
- Game attendance: 50,629
- Game weather: 80 °F (27 °C), Party Cloudy, N 7 mph (11 km/h)
- Referee: John O'Neill
- TV announcers (ESPN2): Marc Kestecher (play-by-play), Rod Gilmore (analyst), and Quint Kessenich (sideline)

Scoring summary
1	9:35	MIN	Rodney Smith 2-yard run (Michael Lantz kick)	MIN 7–0
1	4:33	PUR	J. D. Dellinger 21-yard field goal	MIN 7–3
1	3:34	MIN	Chris Autman-Bell 70-yard pass from Tanner Morgan (Michael Lantz kick)	MIN 14–3
2	14:49	PUR	Zander Horvath 7-yard pass from Jack Plummer (J. D. Dellinger kick)	MIN 14–10
2	5:10	MIN	Rashod Bateman 45-yard pass from Tanner Morgan (Michael Lantz kick)	MIN 21–10
2	:14	MIN	Tyler Johnson 3-yard pass from Tanner Morgan (Michael Lantz kick)	MIN 28–10
3	12:36	PUR	King Doeroe 8-yard run (J. D. Dellinger kick)	MIN 28–17
3	8:49	MIN	Michael Lantz 32-yard field goal	MIN 31–17
3	6:18	MIN	Rashod Bateman 47-yard pass from Tanner Morgan (Michael Lantz kick)	MIN 38–17
4	6:01	PUR	King Doeroe 2-yard run (J. D. Dellinger kick)	MIN 38–24
4	3:59	PUR	King Doeroe 13-yard pass from Jack Plummer (J. D. Dellinger kick)	MIN 38–31

After facing TCU, Purdue remained at home for their four-game and Big Ten Conference opener against Minnesota.

Minnesota won, 38–31. Rodney Smith opened the scoring for Minnesota with a 2-yard touchdown run. Purdue responded with a 21-yard field goal by J. D. Dellinger. The Golden Gophers then extended their lead when Tanner Morgan found Chris Autman-Bell for a 70-yard touchdown pass. On Purdue's next drive, Elijah Sindelar and Rondale Moore both left the game on the same play. Following their departure, Jack Plummer lead the Boilermakers down the field to score on a 7-yard pass to Zander Horvath. Morgan found Rashod Bateman for a 45-yard touchdown, and Tyler Johnson on a 4-yard touchdown to bring the halftime score to 28–10 in favor of Minnesota. Purdue opened the second half scoring when King Doeroe scored on an 8-yard run. Minnesota then connected on a 32-yard field goal by Michael Lantz and Morgan found Bateman on a 47-yard touchdown pass to round out the third quarter scoring. Purdue would add two touchdowns by Doeroe in the fourth quarter, a 2-yard touchdown run and 13-yard reception from Plummer.

Jack Plummer's 7-yard pass to Zander Horvath in the 2nd quarter was his first career touchdown pass, as well as Horvath's first career touchdown reception. George Karlaftis became the first Purdue freshman since 2000 with at least 3.0 sacks in a season. David Bell became the fifth true freshman since 2000 with at least eight catches in a game. King Doeroe became the first true freshman with three touchdowns in a game since Kory Sheets had three against Indiana on November 19, 2005.

=== Penn State ===
Purdue at Penn State

Team	1	2	3	4	Total
Boilermakers	0	7	0	0	7
• No. 12 Nittany Lions	21	7	0	7	35

- Date: October 5
- Location: Beaver Stadium
  University Park, PA
- Game start: 12:05 p.m. EDT
- Elapsed time: 3:26
- Game attendance: 106,536
- Game weather: 56 °F (13 °C), Mostly Sunny, SSE 9 mph (14 km/h)
- Referee: Jeff Servinski
- TV announcers (ESPN): Bob Wischusen (play-by-play), Dan Orlovsky (analyst), and Allison Williams (sideline)

Scoring summary
1	10:22	PSU	K. J. Hamler 2-yard run (Jake Pinegar kick)	PSU 7–0
1	7:04	PSU	Sean Clifford 3-yard run (Jake Pinegar kick)	PSU 14–0
1	5:20	PSU	Jahan Dotson 72-yard pass from Sean Clifford (Jake Pinegar kick)	PSU 21–0
2	14:17	PSU	Pat Freiermuth 7-yard pass from Sean Clifford (Jake Pinegar kick)	PSU 28–0
2	7:18	PUR	Amad Anderson Jr. 15-yard pass from Jack Plummer (J. D. Dellinger kick)	PSU 28–7
4	5:44	PSU	Noah Cain 2-yard run (Jake Pinegar kick)	PSU 35–7

After facing Minnesota, Purdue traveled to University Park, Pennsylvania for the 2nd road game and Big Ten Conference game against Penn State.

Penn State won in a blowout, 35–7. Penn State opened up the scoring in the first quarter with a 2-yard touchdown run by K. J. Hamler. After a Purdue punt, the Nittany Lions scored again on a 3-yard run by Sean Clifford. Penn State would strike again in the first with a 72-yard reception by Jahan Dotson from Clifford. Penn State scored first again in the second quarter with a 7-yard reception by Pat Freiermuth. Purdue finally got on the board with a 15-yard touchdown reception by Amad Anderson Jr. from Jack Plummer, bringing the halftime score to 28–7. The lone score of the second half came during a 2-yard touchdown run by Noah Cain in the fourth quarter.

=== Maryland ===
Maryland at Purdue

Team	1	2	3	4	Total
Terrapins	0	14	0	0	14
• Boilermakers	13	17	3	7	40

- Date: October 12
- Location: Ross–Ade Stadium
  West Lafayette, IN
- Game start: 12:01 p.m. EDT
- Elapsed time: 3:22
- Game attendance: 52,296
- Game weather: 46 °F (8 °C), Clear, SW 14 mph (23 km/h)
- Referee: Rod Snodgrass
- TV announcers (BTN): Brandon Gaudin (play-by-play), James Laurinaitis (analyst), Elise Menaker (sideline)

Scoring summary
1	10:44	PUR	David Bell 23-yard pass from Jack Plummer (two-point run conversion failed)	PUR 6–0
1	7:13	PUR	King Doerue 4-yard run (J.D. Dellinger kick)	PUR 13–0
2	13:57	MD	Javon Leake 21-yard run (Joseph Petrino kick)	PUR 13–7
2	11:05	PUR	Milton Wright 59-yard pass from Jack Plummer (J.D. Dellinger kick)	PUR 20–7
2	9:31	MD	Tyrrell Pigrome 61-yard run (Joseph Petrino kick)	PUR 20–14
2	5:00	PUR	J.D. Dellinger 27-yard field goal	PUR 23–14
2	0:18	PUR	Cory Trice 37-yard interception return (J.D. Dellinger kick)	PUR 30–14
3	5:40	PUR	J.D. Dellinger 27-yard field goal	PUR 33–14
4	13:05	PUR	David Bell 8-yard pass from Jack Plummer (J.D. Dellinger kick)	PUR 40–14

After traveling to Penn State, Purdue returned home for their Big Ten Conference game against Maryland.

Purdue won in a blowout, 40–14. Purdue scored first when Jack Plummer found David Bell, but a bad snap forced Danny Corollo to scramble and the PAT was failed. On their next possession, King Doeroe scored on a 4-yard run for the Boilermakers. Maryland scored their first points in the second quarter on a 21-yard run by Javon Leake. Purdue returned the score with a 59-yard touchdown reception by Milton Wright from Plummer. Maryland cut the deficit when Tyrrell Pigrome scored on a 61-yard run. J. D. Dellinger increased the Purdue lead when he added a 27-yard field goal. A Pigrome interception by Cory Trice returned for 37-yard touchdown to bring the halftime score 30–14 in favor of the Boilermakers. Dellinger's 27-yard field goal was the lone score of the third quarter. Plummer found Bell again for an 8-yard touchdown in the 4th quarter to cap the scoring.

Four freshmen scored all five touchdowns. It marked the first time since at least 1997 that even three freshmen scored a touchdown in a game. It was also the first time since December 31, 2001, vs. Washington State that Purdue had at least three players with at least eight receptions. Cory Trice returned an interception for a touchdown just before halftime, becoming the first Purdue freshman with a pick-six since Ricardo Allen in 2010 at Michigan State.

=== Iowa ===
Purdue at Iowa

Team	1	2	3	4	Total
Boilermakers	0	7	0	13	20
• No. 23 Hawkeyes	6	3	7	10	26

- Date: October 19
- Location: Kinnick Stadium
  Iowa City, IA
- Game start: 11:01 am CDT
- Elapsed time: 3:13
- Game attendance: 69,250
- Game weather: 59 °F (15 °C), Mostly Cloudy, Wind SW 5–8 mph (8.0–12.9 km/h)
- Referee: Jerry McGinn
- TV announcers (ESPN2): Beth Mowins (play-by-play), Anthony Becht (analyst), Rocky Boiman (sideline)

Scoring summary
1	7:45	IA	Keith Duncan 30-yard field goal	IA 3–0
1	2:42	IA	Keith Duncan 44-yard field goal	IA 6–0
2	2:14	IA	Keith Duncan 42-yard field goal	IA 9–0
2	0:38	PUR	David Bell 7-yard pass from Jack Plummer (J.D. Dellinger kick)	IA 9–7
3	7:26	IA	Tyler Goodson 1-yard run (Keith Duncan kick)	IA 16–7
4	14:54	IA	Keith Duncan 38-yard field goal	IA 19–7
4	11:36	PUR	J.D. Dellinger 27-yard field goal	IA 19–10
4	2:59	PUR	J.D. Dellinger 36-yard field goal	IA 19–13
4	2:16	IA	Mekhi Sargent 14-yard run (Keith Duncan kick)	IA 26–13
4	0:24	PUR	Payne Durham 1-yard pass from Jack Plummer (J.D. Dellinger kick)	IA 26–20

Purdue hit the road again, this time traveling to Iowa City, Iowa for a Big Ten Conference game against the Hawkeyes of Iowa.

Iowa defeated Purdue, 26–20. Iowa scored on a pair of Keith Duncan field goals from 30 and 44-yards. Duncan added another field goal in the second from 42-yards. Purdue finally got on the board when Jack Plummer found David Bell from 7-yards out to bring the halftime score to 9–7 in favor of the Hawkeyes. Iowa got the lone score of the 3rd quarter when Tyler Goodson scored on a 1-yard touchdown run. Purdue got the first two scores of the fourth quarter on field goals of 27 and 36-yards from J. D. Dellinger to cut the lead to 6. Iowa scored again on a 14-yard Mekhi Sargent touchdown. Plummer would find Payne Durham in the endzone for a 1-yard touchdown pass, but Purdue failed to recover the onside kick, allowing Iowa to run out the clock.

=== Illinois ===
Illinois at Purdue
(Purdue Cannon)

Team	1	2	3	4	Total
• Fighting Illini	3	14	7	0	24
Boilermakers	0	0	0	6	6

- Date: October 26
- Location: Ross–Ade Stadium
  West Lafayette, IN
- Game start: 12:01 p.m. EDT
- Elapsed time: 3:05
- Game attendance: 58,735
- Game weather: 47 °F (8 °C), Rain, NE 12 mph (19 km/h)
- Referee: Mark Kluczynski
- TV announcers (BTN): Lisa Byington (play-by-play), J Leman (analyst), Elise Menaker (sideline)

Scoring summary
1	2:47	ILL	James McCourt 38-yard field goal	ILL 3–0
2	9:58	ILL	Tony Adams 13-yard interception return (James McCourt kick)	ILL 10–0
2	1:41	ILL	Brandon Peters 1-yard run (James McCourt kick)	ILL 17–0
3	2:35	ILL	Reggie Corbin 20-yard run (James McCourt kick)	ILL 24–0
4	5:49	PUR	Payne Durham 11-yard pass from Aidan O'Connell (O'Connell pass failed)	ILL 24–6

Purdue returned home for their 8th game of the year to renew the rivalry against Illinois for the Purdue Cannon.

Illinois won 24–6. Illinois opened the scoring when James McCourt made a 38-yard field goal. Illinois would score again when Tony Adams intercepted a Jack Plummer pass and returned it 13-yards for a touchdown. Illinois struck again just before the half, when Brandon Peters scored on a 1-yard quarterback sneak to bring the halftime score to 17–0. Illinois increased their lead when Reggie Corbin scored on a 20-yard run. Purdue finally got on the board when Aidan O'Connell found Payne Durham for an 11-yard touchdown pass.

=== Nebraska ===
Nebraska at Purdue

Team	1	2	3	4	Total
Cornhuskers	10	0	3	14	27
• Boilermakers	0	14	3	14	31

- Date: November 2
- Location: Ross–Ade Stadium
  West Lafayette, IN
- Game start: 12:05 p.m. EDT
- Elapsed time: 3:20
- Game attendance: 50,606
- Game weather: 41 °F (5 °C), Cloudy, W 15 mph (24 km/h)
- Referee: Dan Capron
- TV announcers (FOX): Tim Brando (play-by-play), Spencer Tillman (analyst), Coley Harvey (sideline)

Scoring summary
1	8:32	NEB	Dedrick Mills 1-yard run (Barret Pickering kick)	NEB 7–0
1	2:05	NEB	Barret Pickering 23-yard field goal	NEB 10–0
2	7:04	PUR	King Doerue 3-yard pass from Jack Plummer (J. D. Dellinger kick)	NEB 10–7
2	:14	PUR	Payne Durham 16-yard pass from Jack Plummer (J. D. Dellinger kick)	PUR 14–10
3	9:21	NEB	Barret Pickering 21-yard field goal	PUR 14–13
3	1:14	PUR	J. D. Dellinger 44-yard field goal	PUR 17–13
4	12:30	NEB	Adrian Martinez 2-yard run (Barret Pickering kick)	NEB 20–17
4	6:50	PUR	King Doerue 7-yard run (J. D. Dellinger kick)	PUR 24–20
4	4:21	NEB	Adrian Martinez 4-yard run (Barret Pickering kick)	NEB 27–24
4	1:08	PUR	David Bell 9-yard run (J. D. Dellinger kick)	PUR 31–27

Purdue would remain at home again to face division-rival, Nebraska.

Purdue won 31–27. Nebraska struck first when Dedrick Mills scored on a 1-yard touchdown run. Barret Pickering would add a 23-yard field goal to round out the first quarter scoring. Purdue finally got their first score of the game in the second quarter when Jack Plummer found King Doerue for a touchdown from 3 yards out. Purdue would take its first lead when Plummer found Payne Durham who made two defenders miss on his way to the endzone from 16-yards out, bringing the halftime score to 14–10. The Cornhuskers and Boilermakers would trade field goals of 21 and 44 yards respectively in the third quarter. Nebraska would take the lead back from Purdue in the 4th quarter when Adrian Martinez scored on a 2-yard run. Purdue would respond with a Doerue touchdown run of 7-yards. Martinez scored again from 4-yards out. Purdue would take the lead for good with 1:08 left in the game on a reverse touchdown run by David Bell.

Freshman have scored the last 16 touchdowns Purdue has scored. Purdue ran for a season-high 145-yards. King Doerue became the first player since Ralph Bolden in 2009 with multiple games of at least one rush touchdown and one receiving touchdown, and the only freshman since at least 1997). David Bell surpassed 50 catches on the season, now with 51. He also became only the fourth Purdue player since 1997 with at least seven receptions and a rushing touchdown in the same game (Rondale Moore, Dorien Bryant, Kory Sheets)

=== Northwestern ===
Purdue at Northwestern

Team	1	2	3	4	Total
• Boilermakers	0	7	14	3	24
Wildcats	14	2	0	6	22

- Date: November 9
- Location: Ryan Field
  Evanston, IL
- Game start: 12:01 p.m. CST
- Elapsed time: 3:19
- Game attendance: 37,194
- Game weather: 38 °F (3 °C), Partly Cloudy, SW 14 mph (23 km/h)
- Referee: Jeffrey Servins
- TV announcers (BTN): Brandon Gaudin (play-by-play), James Laurinaitis (analyst), Elise Menaker (sideline)

Scoring summary
1	10:34	NW	Kyric McGowan 79-yard run (Charlie Kuhbander kick)	NW 7–0
1	3:47	NW	Jace James 16-yard pass from Aidan Smith (Charlie Kuhbander kick)	NW 14–0
2	9:57	PUR	King Doerue 12-yard run (J. D. Dellinger kick)	NW 14–7
2	:59	NW	Aidan O'Connell grounding in the endzone	NW 16–7
3	9:26	PUR	David Bell 13-yard pass from Aidan O'Connell (J. D. Dellinger kick)	NW 16–14
3	6:28	PUR	Amad Anderson Jr. 11-yard pass from Aidan O'Connell (J. D. Dellinger kick)	PUR 21–16
4	11:10	NW	Riley Lees 8-yard pass from Aidan Smith (Lees pass failed)	NW 22–21
4	:03	PUR	J. D. Dellinger 39-yard field goal	PUR 24–21

Purdue would next travel to Evanston, Illinois, to face the reigning Big Ten West division champions, the Northwestern Wildcats.

Purdue defeated Northwestern, 24–22. Northwestern got on the board first when Kyric McGowan got loose on a 79-yard touchdown run. Jace James would add a 16-yard touchdown pass from Aidan Smith to round out the first quarter scoring. Purdue finally got their first score of the game in the second quarter when King Doerue scored a touchdown from 12 yards out. Purdue would take a safety when Aidan O'Connell was called for intentional grounding in the end zone, bringing the halftime score to 16–7. The Boilermaker offense got it going in the third quarter when David Bell and Amad Anderson Jr each hauled in touchdown passes of Aidan O'Connell from 13 and 11 yards respectively. Northwestern would take the lead back from Purdue in the 4th quarter when Smith found Riley Lees on an 8-yard pass. Purdue would take the lead for good with 0:03 left in the game on a 39-yard field goal by J. D. Dellinger.

=== Wisconsin ===
Purdue at Wisconsin

Team	1	2	3	4	Total
Boilermakers	3	14	7	0	24
• No. 12 Badgers	14	10	14	7	45

- Date: November 23
- Location: Camp Randall Stadium
  Madison, WI
- Game start: 3:05 p.m. CST
- Elapsed time: 3:05
- Game attendance: 70,747
- Game weather: 43 °F (6 °C), Sunny, WSW 11 mph (18 km/h)
- Referee: Dan Capron
- TV announcers (FOX): Tim Brando (play-by-play), Spencer Tillman (analyst), Coley Harvey (sideline)

Scoring summary
1	11:29	WI	Aron Cruickshank 27-yard run (Collin Larsh kick)	WI 7–0
1	5:24	PUR	J. D. Dellinger 28-yard field goal	WI 7–3
1	1:30	WI	Jonathan Taylor 51-yard run (Collin Larsh kick)	WI 14–3
2	14:53	PUR	Brycen Hopkins 7-yard pass from Aidan O'Connell (J. D. Dellinger kick)	WI 14–10
2	8:30	PUR	Brycen Hopkins 37-yard pass from Aidan O'Connell (J. D. Dellinger kick)	PUR 17–14
2	4:18	WI	Jack Dunn 18-yard pass from Jack Coan (Collin Larsh kick)	WI 21–17
2	:00	WI	Zach Hintze 62-yard field goal	WI 24–17
3	5:59	WI	Garrett Groshek 6-yard run (Collin Larsh kick)	WI 31–17
3	2:00	WI	Quintez Cephus 29-yard pass from Jack Coan (Collin Larsh kick)	WI 38–17
3	:13	PUR	David Bell 8-yard pass from Aidan O'Connell (J. D. Dellinger kick)	WI 38–24
4	4:40	WI	Mason Stokke 1-yard run (Collin Larsh kick)	WI 45–24

Purdue would next travel to Madison, Wisconsin to face the Big Ten West division leaders, the Wisconsin Badgers.

Wisconsin blew out Purdue, 45–24. Wisconsin scored first when Aron Cruickshank scored on a 27-yard jet sweep for a touchdown. Purdue would score next when J. D. Dellinger connected on a 28-yard field goal. The Badgers scored again when Jonathan Taylor found paydirt from 51-yards out. Purdue took the lead in the second quarter when Aidan O'Connell found Brycen Hopkins twice from 7 and then Milton Wright found Hopkins for a 37-yard score. Wisconsin responded with an 18-yard touchdown reception by Jack Dunn from Jack Coan, and a 62-yard field goal by Zach Hintze to round out the halftime scoring with Wisconsin up 24–17. The Badgers began to pull away in the third quarter when Garrett Groshek scored from 6-yards out and again when Coan found Quintez Cephus for a 29-yard reception. Purdue responded just before the quarters end when O'Connell found David Bell on an 8-yard pass. Wisconsin capped the scoring when Mason Stokke scored on a 1-yard run to make the score 45–24.

Purdue scored 24 points and produced 376 yards of total offense, the most since scoring 26 points in 2003 and gaining 428 yards in 2005. David Bell became the first Purdue player since Chris Daniels in 1999 with three games of at least 12 receptions in a season. Brycen Hopkins became the first Purdue tight end since Tim Stratton in 1998 to score multiple touchdowns in at least two games in a season.

=== Indiana ===
Indiana at Purdue
(Old Oaken Bucket)

Team	1	2	3	4	OT	2OT	Total
• Hoosiers	7	14	7	3	7	6	44
Boilermakers	0	10	7	14	7	3	41

- Date: November 30
- Location: Ross–Ade Stadium
  West Lafayette, IN
- Game start: 12:01 p.m. EST
- Elapsed time: 4:04
- Game attendance: 55,338
- Game weather: 39 °F (4 °C), Overcast, E 19 mph (31 km/h)
- Referee: Ron Snodgrass
- TV announcers (ESPN2): Anish Shroff (Play-By-Play), John Congemi (Analyst), Kris Budden (Sideline)

Scoring summary
1	5:38	IU	Whop Philyor 8-yard pass from Peyton Ramsey (Logan Justus kick)	IU 7–0
2	12:39	IU	Peyton Ramsey 1-yard run (Logan Justus kick)	IU 14–0
2	9:52	PUR	J. D. Dellinger 20-yard field goal	IU 14–3
2	7:04	PUR	Brycen Hopkins 72-yard pass from Aidan O'Connell (J. D. Dellinger kick)	IU 14–10
2	3:20	IU	Sampson James 3-yard run (Logan Justus kick)	IU 21–10
3	3:30	IU	Whop Philyor 37-yard pass from Peyton Ramsey (Logan Justus kick)	IU 28–10
3	1:44	PUR	Zander Horvath 1-yard run (J. D. Dellinger kick)	IU 28–17
4	9:13	PUR	Zander Horvath 1-yard run (Aidan O'Connell pass failed)	IU 28–23
4	5:08	IU	Charles Campbell 41-yard field goal	IU 31–23
4	2:48	PUR	David Bell 20-yard pass from Aidan O'Connell (Aidan O'Connell pass to Brycen Hopkins)	TIE 31–31
OT	:00	IU	Nick Westbrook 14-yard pass from Peyton Ramsey (Logan Justus kick)	IU 38–31
OT	:00	PUR	Brycen Hopkins 6-yard pass from Aidan O'Connell (J. D. Dellinger kick)	TIE 38–38
OT2	:00	PUR	J. D. Dellinger 34-yard field goal	PUR 41–38
OT2	:00	IU	Peyton Ramsey 1-yard run	IU 44–41

Purdue would next return home to face the Big Ten East division rival and chief rival, the Indiana Hoosiers for the Old Oaken Bucket.

Indiana defeated Purdue, 44–41. Indiana got the lone score of the first quarter when Peyton Ramsey found Whop Philyor wide open in the back of the endzone. Ramsey scored again on a 1-yard run. Purdue scored for the first time when J. D. Dellinger made a 20-yard field goal, and again when Aidan O'Connell found Brycen Hopkins for a 72-yard pass. The Hoosiers would score when on a Sampson James run from 3-yards out to bring the halftime score to 21–10. Philyor would score again when Ramsey found him from 37-yards out. Purdue began to mount its comeback when Zander Horvath scored a 1-yard touchdowns on back-to-back possessions. Charles Campbell would increase the Hoosiers lead when he connected on a 41-yard field goal. Purdue would finally tie the game with 2:48 remaining when O'Connell found David Bell with an acrobatic catch, with O'Connell then finding Hopkins to complete the 2-point conversion. Indiana scored first in overtime when Ramsey found Nick Westbrook-Ikhine for a 14-yard score. Facing 4th down, O'Connell found Hopkins for the tying touchdown on the same play as the two-point conversion to force a second overtime. When Purdue scored on a 34-yard Dellinger field goal, the Hoosiers scored the winning score when Ramsey ran a QB sneak from 1-yard out.

Purdue finished with a season-high 589 yards of total offense (408 passing, 181 rush); its only games with at least 400 passing yards and 181 rushing yards since at least 1997. Zander Horvath had 239 all-purpose yards, the most by a Purdue running back since Raheem Mostert had 270 in 2014 again Minnesota. David Bell finished the season with 86 receptions, the 8th most for a Purdue player in a single season. Brycen Hopkins finished his career 21st for total receptions (130) and 12th in career receiving yards (1,945).

== Awards and honors ==
Weekly Awards
Player	Award	Date Awarded	Ref.
Elijah Sindelar	Big Ten Offensive Player of the Week	September 9, 2019	
Jack Plummer	Big Ten Offensive Player of the Week	October 14, 2019	
David Bell	Big Ten Freshman of the Week	October 14, 2019	
David Bell	Big Ten Freshman of the Week	October 21, 2019	
King Doerue	Big Ten Freshman of the Week	November 4, 2019	
J. D. Dellinger	Big Ten Special Teams of the Week	November 11, 2019	
David Bell	Big Ten Freshman of the Week	November 11, 2019	
David Bell	Big Ten Freshman of the Week	November 25, 2019	

== Players drafted into the NFL ==
Round	Pick	Player	Position	NFL Club
4	136	Brycen Hopkins	TE	Los Angeles Rams
7	215	Markus Bailey	ILB	Cincinnati Bengals
