= David Bell (American football) =

American football player (born 2000)

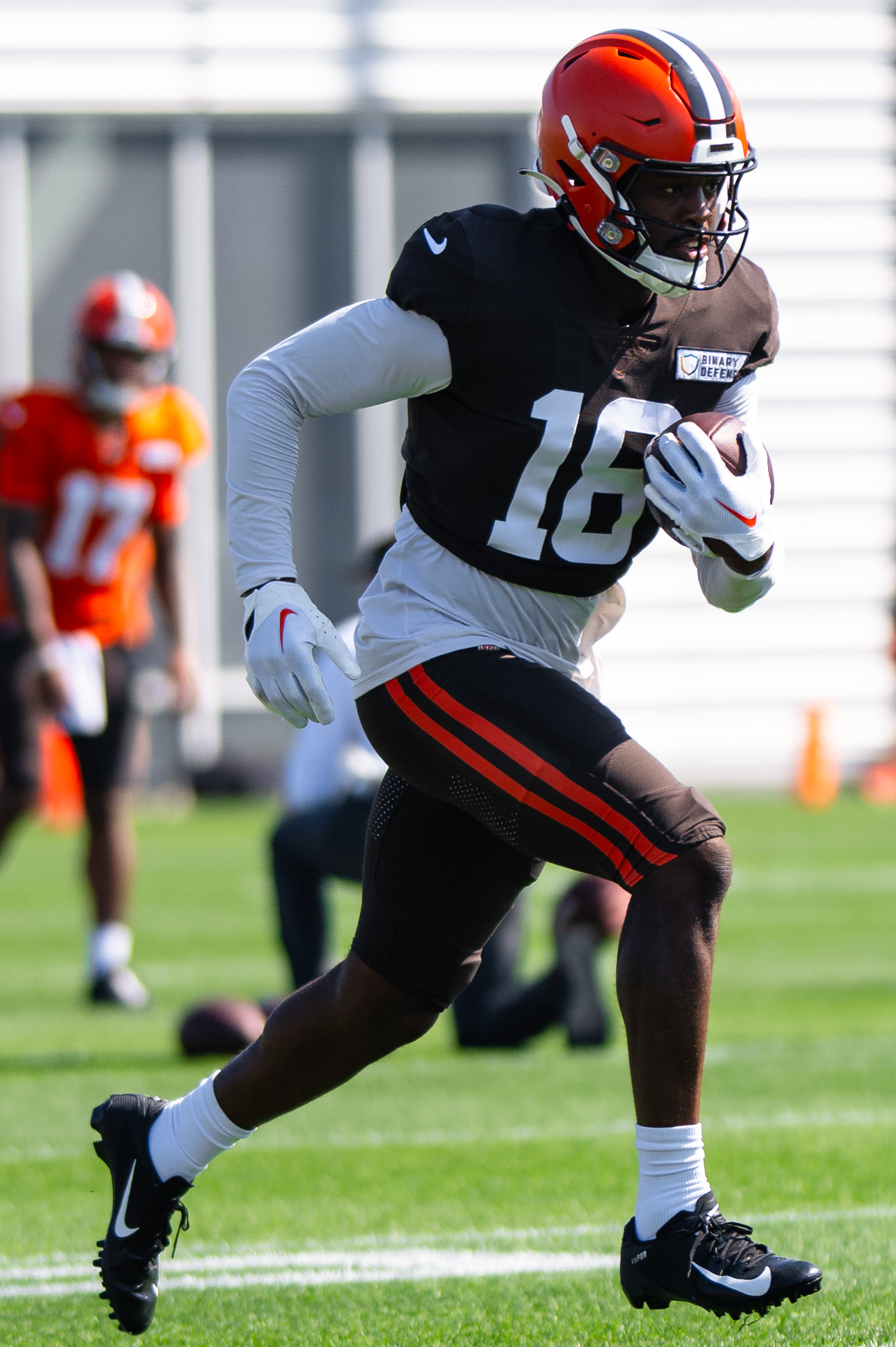
- Bell with the Cleveland Browns in 2023

No. 18
- Position: Wide receiver

Personal information
- Born: December 14, 2000 (age 25); Indianapolis, Indiana, U.S.
- Listed height: 6 ft 1 in (1.85 m)
- Listed weight: 212 lb (96 kg)

Career information
- High school: Warren Central (Indianapolis)
- College: Purdue (2019–2021)
- NFL draft: 2022: 3rd round, 99th overall pick

Career history
- Cleveland Browns (2022–2025)

Awards and highlights
- Consensus All-American (2021); Big Ten Receiver of the Year (2021); Big Ten Freshman of the Year (2019); 2× First-team All-Big Ten (2020, 2021); Second-team All-Big Ten (2019)

Career NFL statistics
- Receptions: 41
- Receiving yards: 408
- Receiving touchdowns: 3
- Stats at Pro Football Reference

David Kyreem Bell (born December 14, 2000) is an American former professional football player who spent his entire four-year career as a wide receiver with the Cleveland Browns of the National Football League (NFL). He played college football for the Purdue Boilermakers and was selected by the Browns in the third round of the 2022 NFL draft.

== Early life ==
Bell grew up in Indianapolis, Indiana, and attended Warren Central High School. As a junior, Bell recorded 52 catches for 1,075 yards and 11 touchdowns. He was also a member of Warren Central's undefeated Class 4A State Championship Basketball team. As a senior, Bell caught 85 passes for 1,542 yards and 22 touchdowns and was named the Marion County Athlete of the Year and Male Athlete of the Year by The Indianapolis Star as well as the Indiana Gatorade Player of the Year as the Warriors went on to win the 6A State Title. Rated the best recruit in Indiana by several outlets, Bell committed to play college football at Purdue over offers from Penn State and Ohio State during the All-American Bowl.

== College career ==
Bell became a starter at wide receiver as a true freshman at Purdue University. Bell was named the Big Ten Conference Freshman of the Week four times, including after catching nine passes for 138 yards and two touchdowns on October 12, 2019, against Maryland. He finished the season with 86 receptions for 1,035 yards and seven touchdowns and was named the Big Ten Freshman of the Year.

Bell was named the Big Ten co-Offensive Player of the Week for the first week of his sophomore season after catching 13 passes for 121 yards and three touchdowns in a 24–20 win over Iowa. He was named first-team All-Big Ten after catching 53 passes for 625 yards and eight touchdowns over six games in the team's COVID-19-shortened 2020 season. As a junior, Bell repeated as a first-team All-Big Ten selection and the Richter–Howard Receiver of the Year. He was named as a Consensus All-American for 2021.

=== College statistics ===
Year	Team	Games		Receiving				Rushing			
Year	Team	GP	GS	Rec	Yards	Avg	TD	Att	Yards	Avg	TD
2019	Purdue	12	9	86	1,035	12.0	7	3	12	4.0	1
2020	Purdue	6	6	53	625	11.8	8	0	0	0.0	0
2021	Purdue	11	11	93	1,286	13.8	6	3	39	13.0	0
Career		29	26	232	2,946	12.7	21	6	51	8.5	1

== Professional career ==
Pre-draft measurables
Height	Weight	Arm length	Hand span	Wingspan	40-yard dash	10-yard split	20-yard split	20-yard shuttle	Three-cone drill	Vertical jump	Broad jump
6 ft 0 7/8 in (1.85 m)	212 lb (96 kg)	31 7/8 in (0.81 m)	9 1/4 in (0.23 m)	6 ft 4 5/8 in (1.95 m)	4.65 s	1.56 s	2.66 s	4.57 s	7.14 s	33.0 in (0.84 m)	9 ft 10 in (3.00 m)
All values from NFL Combine

Bell was selected by the Cleveland Browns with the 99th overall pick in the third round of the 2022 NFL draft. He finished his rookie season with 24 receptions for 214 receiving yards in 16 games and three starts.

On December 10, 2023, Bell caught the first touchdown of his career on a 41–yard reception from Joe Flacco against the Jacksonville Jaguars. He finished the 2023 season with 14 receptions for 167 yards and three touchdowns, two of which came in Week 18 against the Cincinnati Bengals.

On September 5, 2024, Bell was waived by the Browns after initially making the 53 man roster, and re-signed to the practice squad. He was promoted to the active roster on September 11, but suffered a hip injury in Week 2 and placed on season-ending injured reserve.

Bell opened the 2025 season on the Browns' non-football injury list. On October 14, 2025, Bell announced his retirement from professional football, citing an off-field injury so severe that suiting up again would "literally risk life and limb." According to his lawyer, Brad Sohn, Bell was on the non-football injury list due to a botched surgery unrelated to his hip injury. Sohn told The Plain Dealer that a complication from the surgery would have made it "life-threatening" for Bell to try to play again, forcing him to retire.

In October 2026, Bell sued surgeon William Meyers, radiologist Adam Zoga, and 12 other defendants in the Philadelphia Court of Common Pleas, claiming that they misled him into taking an unnecessary surgery that nearly killed him and forced his retirement. Bell claimed that Meyers and Zoga misrepresented the results of an MRI and led him to believe core muscle surgery could resolve the lingering pain from his injured hip. Bell alleged that Meyers sliced his femoral artery during surgery, forcing an emergency grafting procedure at Thomas Jefferson University Hospital. According to Bell, the graft saved his life but made it impossible for him to play again. He is seeking $300 million in damages, the equivalent of his potential earnings had he still been able to play.
