= Aidan O'Connell =

American football player (born 1998)

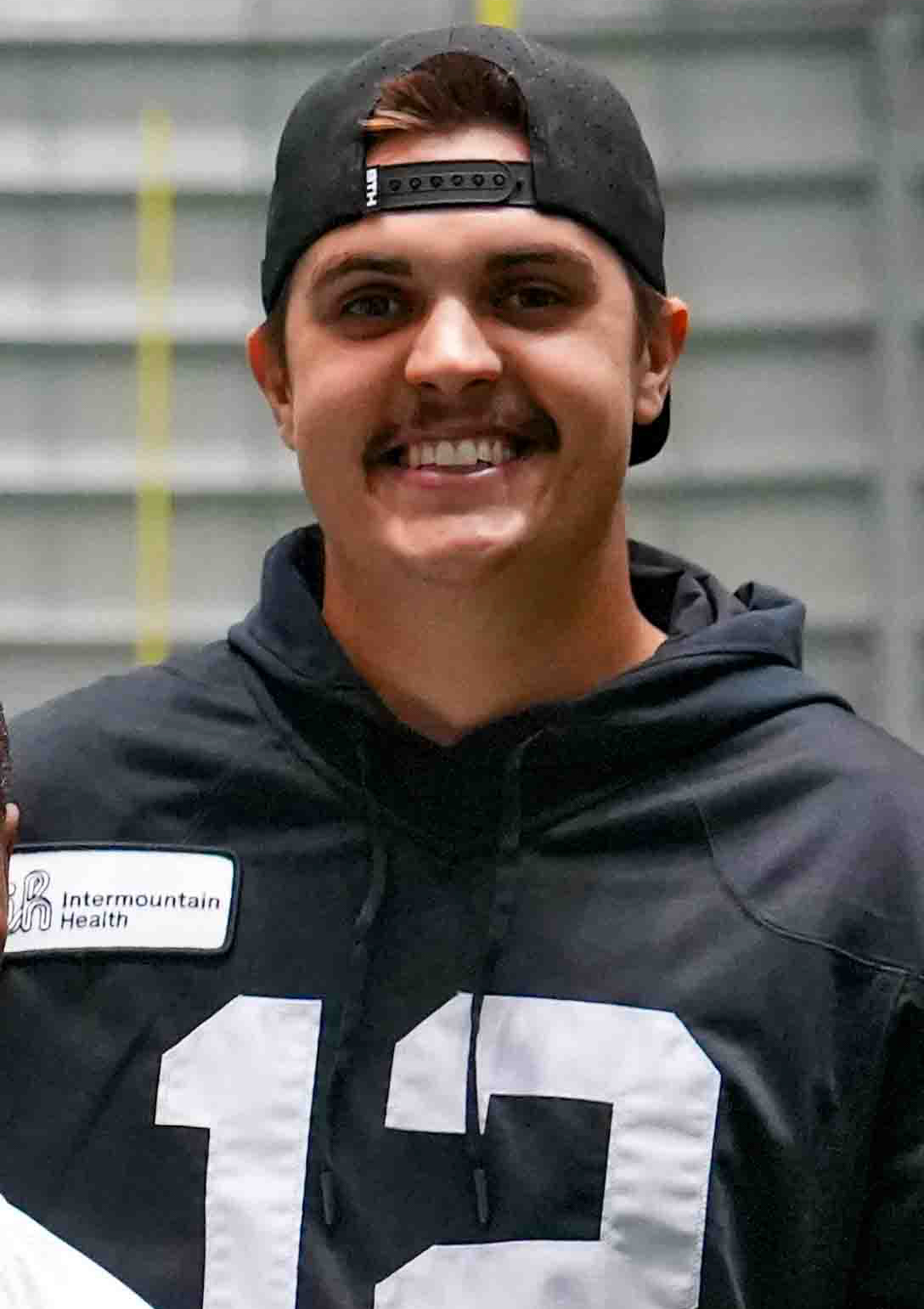
- O'Connell in 2025

No. 12 – Las Vegas Raiders
- Position: Quarterback
- Roster status: Active

Personal information
- Born: September 1, 1998 (age 28); Long Grove, Illinois, U.S.
- Listed height: 6 ft 3 in (1.91 m)
- Listed weight: 206 lb (93 kg)

Career information
- High school: Stevenson (Lincolnshire, Illinois)
- College: Purdue (2017–2022)
- NFL draft: 2023: 4th round, 135th overall pick

Career history
- Las Vegas Raiders (2023–present)

Awards and highlights
- 2× Second-team All-Big Ten (2021, 2022)

Career NFL statistics as of 2025
- Passing attempts: 608
- Passing completions: 377
- Completion percentage: 62.0%
- TD–INT: 20–11
- Passing yards: 3,932
- Passer rating: 84.1
- Rushing yards: 48
- Rushing touchdowns: 2
- Stats at Pro Football Reference

Aidan James O'Connell (born September 1, 1998) is an American professional football quarterback for the Las Vegas Raiders of the National Football League (NFL). He played college football for the Purdue Boilermakers and was selected by the Raiders in the fourth round of the 2023 NFL draft.

== Early life ==
O'Connell was born on September 1, 1998, and grew up in Long Grove, Illinois. O'Connell is the middle child of five brothers: Sean, Patrick, Liam, and Seamus. He also has one sister, Grace.

O'Connell played high school football and basketball for Stevenson High School in Lincolnshire, Illinois. He was not a highly recruited Illinois high school athlete, as his only scholarship offer came from Davenport University, a Division II school. In 2016, his only season as a starter, he threw for a school record 2,741 yards and 26 touchdowns.

College recruiting
Name	Hometown	School	Height	Weight	40^{‡}	Commit date
Aidan O'Connell; QB	Lincolnshire, Illinois	Stevenson (IL)	6 ft 3 in (1.91 m)	170 lb (77 kg)	Feb 6, 2016	
Aidan O'Connell; QB	Recruit ratings: No ratings found					
Overall recruit ranking: Rivals: NR (IL) ESPN: NR (national), NR (QB, pocket passer), NR (IL)
Note: In many cases, Scout, Rivals, 247Sports, On3, and ESPN may conflict in their listings of height and weight.; In these cases, the average was taken. ESPN grades are on a 100-point scale.; Sources: "Purdue Football Commitments". Rivals.; "2017 Purdue Football Commits". Scout.; "ESPN". ESPN.; "Scout.com Team Recruiting Rankings". Scout.; "2017 Team Ranking". Rivals.com.

== College career ==
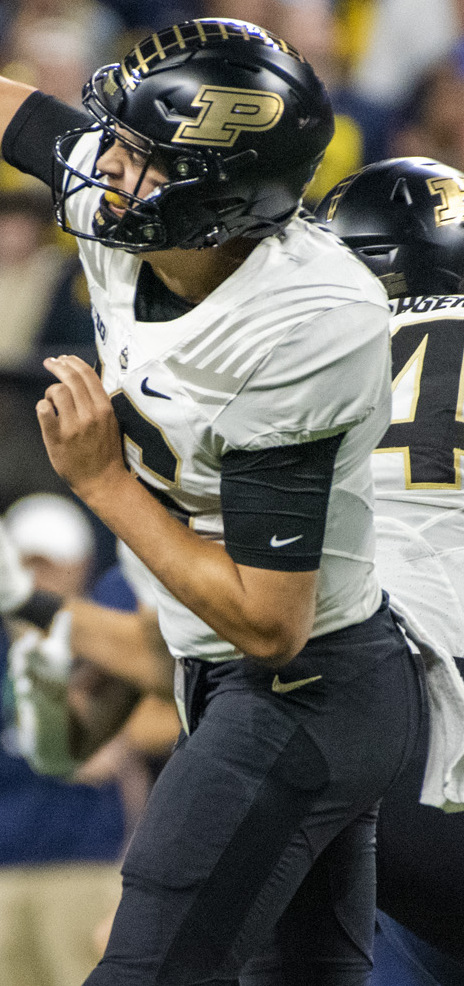
O'Connell with Purdue during a game against the Michigan Wolverines in 2022

On February 3, 2017, O'Connell committed to play college football for Wheaton College, but less than a month later, he accepted a preferred walk-on spot with Purdue.

After not playing in 2017 and 2018, he played in six games in 2019 and started three. He made his first career start against Northwestern, completing 34 of 50 passes for 271 yards with two touchdowns and two interceptions. Overall that season, he completed 103 of 164 passes for 1,101 yards with eight touchdowns and four interceptions. O'Connell entered 2020 as the starter before suffering a season-ending injury after three games. He completed 88 of 136 passes for 916 yards with seven touchdowns and two interceptions. O'Connell entered 2021 as the backup to Jack Plummer, but eventually took over as the starter and completed 315 of 440 passes for 3,712 yards with 28 touchdowns and 11 interceptions. He decided to enter the 2023 NFL draft after the 2022 season. In the 2022 season, he passed for 3,490 yards, 22 touchdowns, and 13 interceptions to go with a rushing touchdown.

== Professional career ==
Pre-draft measurables
Height	Weight	Arm length	Hand span	Wingspan
6 ft 3 3/8 in (1.91 m)	213 lb (97 kg)	32 1/4 in (0.82 m)	9 3/4 in (0.25 m)	6 ft 4 1/4 in (1.94 m)
All values from the NFL Combine

=== 2023 season ===
O'Connell was drafted by the Las Vegas Raiders in the fourth round with the 135th pick of the 2023 NFL draft.

On October 1, 2023, O'Connell made his first career NFL start, filling in for an injured Jimmy Garoppolo. Playing against the Los Angeles Chargers, he went 24-of-39 for 238 yards and had his first career rushing touchdown on a goal-line sneak. The Raiders lost 24–17 in his debut. On November 1, 2023, O'Connell was named the starting quarterback for the remainder of the season. In Week 15, O'Connell threw four touchdown passes in a dominant 63–21 victory over the Los Angeles Chargers. During the Week 16 Christmas Day game against the Kansas City Chiefs, where despite his team winning 20–14, O'Connell went 9 of 21 in pass attempts for 62 yards, never completing a pass after the first quarter. O'Connell went 5–5 as a starter. He finished with 2,218 passing yards, 12 passing touchdowns and 7 interceptions to go with a rushing touchdown.

=== 2024 season ===
Following a preseason quarterback competition with new free agent signing Gardner Minshew, O'Connell was named a backup to begin the season. After the Raiders began the season with a 2–3 record, O'Connell was named the starter on October 9. In his first start of the season, O'Connell passed for 227 yards, one touchdown, and one interception as the Raiders lost to the Pittsburgh Steelers 32–13. Against the Los Angeles Rams on October 20, O'Connell suffered a fractured thumb and was later placed on injured reserve. After missing four games, the Raiders activated O'Connell to the 53-man roster on November 28, ahead of the team's Week 13 matchup against the Chiefs. In his return from injury, O'Connell produced the first 300-yard performance of his career, finishing with 340 yards, two touchdowns, and zero interceptions, but miscommunication in the final minute resulted in a lost fumble as the Raiders lost 19–17. He sustained another injury in the team's Week 14 matchup against the Tampa Bay Buccaneers as he suffered a bone bruise to his knee, before returning in Week 16 to end off the season with a record of 2–5.

=== 2025 season ===
O'Connell suffered a fractured wrist in the Raiders' preseason finale against the Arizona Cardinals, and was placed on injured reserve to begin the season as a result. He was activated on November 19, ahead of the team's Week 12 matchup against the Cleveland Browns. Serving as the team's third-string quarterback behind starter Geno Smith and backup Kenny Pickett throughout the year, O'Connell would make his sole 2025 season appearance during a Week 18 win against the Kansas City Chiefs, passing for 102 yards and marking the Raiders' first win against the Chiefs in Allegiant Stadium.

=== 2026 season ===
O'Connell began the 2026 season as the third-string quarterback behind Kirk Cousins and first overall draft pick Fernando Mendoza.

== Career statistics ==
=== NFL ===
Year	Team	Games			Passing									Rushing					Sacks		Fumbles	
Year	Team	GP	GS	Record	Cmp	Att	Pct	Yds	Y/A	Lng	TD	Int	Rtg	Att	Yds	Avg	Lng	TD	Sck	SckY	Fum	Lost
2023	LV	11	10	5–5	213	343	62.1	2,218	6.5	50	12	7	83.9	17	11	0.6	3	1	24	173	4	2
2024	LV	9	7	2–5	154	243	63.4	1,612	6.6	58	8	4	86.7	21	30	1.4	13	1	10	82	2	2
2025	LV	1	0	—	10	22	45.5	102	4.6	23	0	0	59.3	1	7	7.0	7	0	1	5	0	0
Career		21	17	7–10	377	608	62.0	3,932	6.5	58	20	11	84.1	39	48	1.2	13	2	35	260	6	4

=== College ===
Season	Team	Games			Passing								Rushing			
Season	Team	GP	GS	Record	Cmp	Att	Pct	Yds	Y/A	TD	Int	Rtg	Att	Yds	Avg	TD
2017	Purdue	0	0	—	DNP											
2018	Purdue	0	0	—	DNP											
2019	Purdue	6	3	1–2	103	164	62.8	1,101	6.7	8	4	130.4	15	−9	−0.6	0
2020	Purdue	3	3	2–1	88	136	64.7	916	6.7	7	2	135.3	12	−64	−5.3	0
2021	Purdue	12	9	6–3	315	439	71.8	3,712	8.5	28	11	158.8	25	−120	−4.8	1
2022	Purdue	12	12	7–5	320	499	64.1	3,490	7.0	22	13	132.2	43	−81	−1.9	1
Career		33	27	16–11	826	1,238	66.7	9,219	7.4	65	30	141.8	95	−274	−2.9	2

== Personal life ==
O'Connell is married to Jael O'Connell (née Johnson), who played volleyball at Purdue.
