= Josh Kaltenberger =

American football player (born 2001)

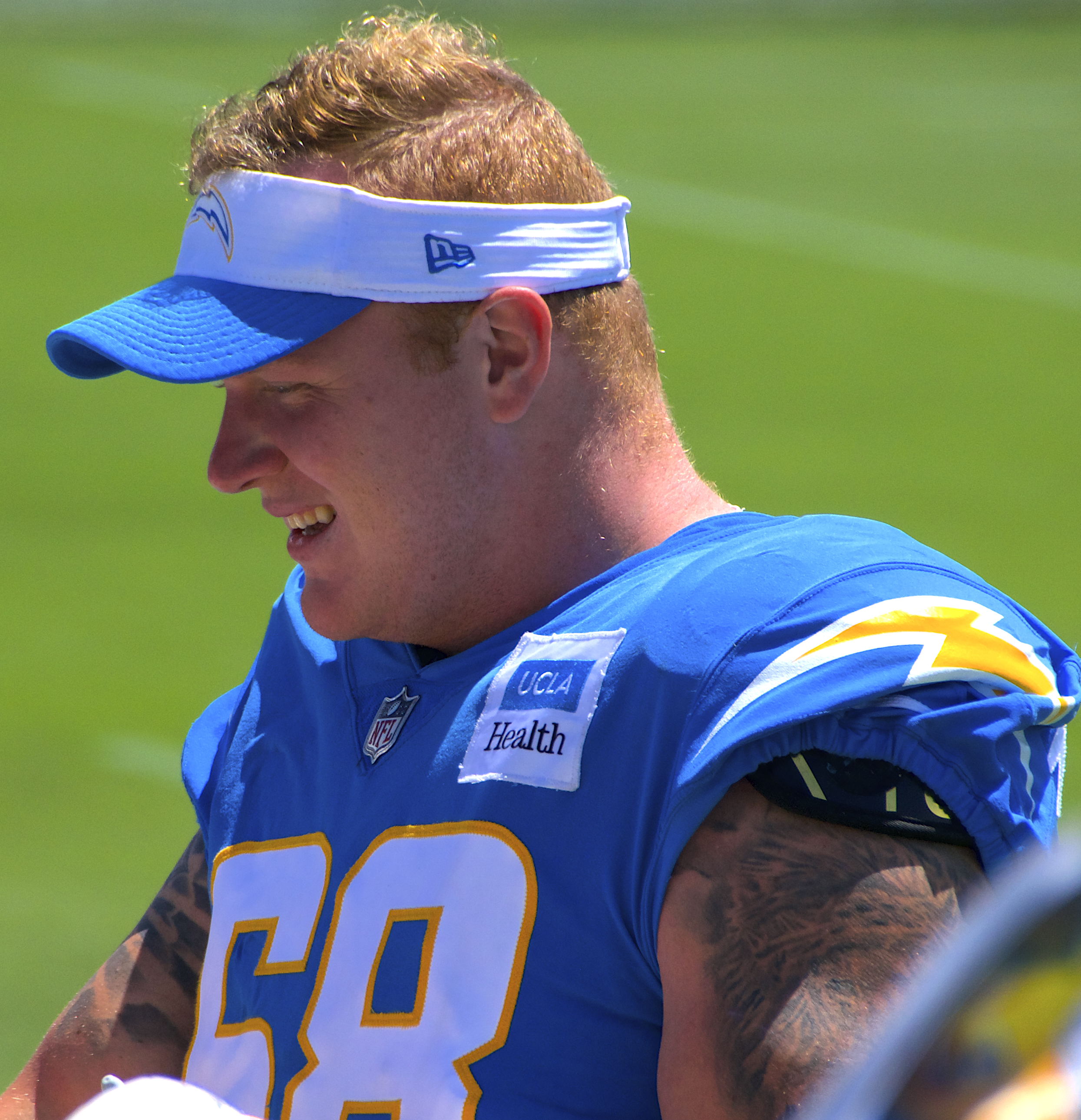
- Kaltenberger with the Los Angeles Chargers in 2026

No. 68 – Los Angeles Chargers
- Position: Center
- Roster status: Practice squad

Personal information
- Born: August 10, 2001 (age 25); Pittsburgh, Pennsylvania, U.S.
- Listed height: 6 ft 6 in (1.98 m)
- Listed weight: 308 lb (140 kg)

Career information
- High school: Seneca Valley (Harmony, Pennsylvania)
- College: Purdue (2020–2023); Maryland (2024)
- NFL draft: 2025: undrafted

Career history
- Los Angeles Chargers (2025–present)*
- * Offseason or practice squad member only
- Stats at Pro Football Reference

Josh Kaltenberger (born August 10, 2001) is an American professional football center for the Los Angeles Chargers of the National Football League (NFL). He played college football for the Purdue Boilermakers and the Maryland Terrapins.

== College career ==
Kaltenberger played college football for the Purdue Boilermakers from 2020 to 2023 and the Maryland Terrapins in 2024. After redshirting his first year, he played in 13 games as a redshirt freshman. The following year, Kaltenberger appeared in 14 games and started three of them at center. In 2023, he played in 10 games and started in four of them. In 2024, Kaltenberger transferred to Maryland where he started in all 12 games at center.

== Professional career ==
Pre-draft measurables
Height	Weight	Arm length	Hand span	Wingspan	40-yard dash	10-yard split	20-yard split	20-yard shuttle	Three-cone drill	Vertical jump	Broad jump	Bench press
6 ft 6 1/4 in (1.99 m)	311 lb (141 kg)	31 3/4 in (0.81 m)	9 5/8 in (0.24 m)	6 ft 7 in (2.01 m)	5.13 s	1.71 s	2.75 s	4.87 s	7.69 s	32.0 in (0.81 m)	9 ft 5 in (2.87 m)	26 reps
All values from Pro Day

After not being selected in the 2025 NFL draft, Kaltenberger signed with the Los Angeles Chargers as an undrafted free agent. He was waived as part of final roster cut downs on August 26, 2025, before signing to the practice squad the following day. He spent time on and off the Chargers practice squad throughout the season, being released five times, before signing a reserve/future contract with Los Angeles on January 13, 2026.

On August 30, 2026, Kaltenberger was waived by the Chargers as a part of final roster cuts; he was re-signed to the team's practice squad the following day.
