= Milton Wright (American football) =

American football player (born 2000)

Profile
- Position: Wide receiver

Personal information
- Born: September 28, 2000 (age 26); Louisville, Kentucky, U.S.
- Listed height: 6 ft 3 in (1.91 m)
- Listed weight: 195 lb (88 kg)

Career information
- High school: Christian Academy of Louisville
- College: Purdue
- NFL draft: 2023: undrafted

Career history
- Los Angeles Chargers (2023)*; BC Lions (2024)*
- * Offseason or practice squad member only
- Stats at Pro Football Reference

Milton James Wright (born September 28, 2000) is an American former professional football wide receiver. He played for the Purdue Boilermakers from 2019 to 2021 and was ruled ineligible for the 2022 season due to academic reasons.

== Early life ==
Wright was born on September 28, 2000, in Louisville, Kentucky. He attended the Christian Academy of Louisville and played wide receiver for the football team, helping them win the class 2A state championship while posting 67 receptions for 1,010 yards as a senior. He was ranked a four-star recruit, the third-best player in the state and the 159th-best nationally. Wright committed to play college football for the Purdue Boilermakers.

== College career ==
As a true freshman at Purdue University in 2019, Wright played in 11 games, five as a starter, and recorded 18 receptions for 288 yards with one score. The following year, he started all six games in the COVID-19-shortened season and made 24 catches for 305 yards with two touchdowns. His best performance came against Illinois, when he posted 100 receiving yards on six catches with one score.

In 2021, Wright had his best season; he played and started all 12 games while being the third receiver on the depth chart, tallying 57 receptions for 732 yards with seven touchdowns, being named fourth-team All-Big Ten Conference by Phil Steele. His season included an eight-catch, 213-yard performance against Northwestern while scoring three touchdowns; he also had 98 receiving yards and a score against Ohio State. Wright missed Purdue's bowl game at the end of the season due to academic issues.

Wright was set to be Purdue's top receiver heading into the 2022 season; however, his academic issues persisted, despite him skipping spring practice to focus on it, and in May 2022 it was announced that he was no longer on the team and was ruled ineligible for the season. After the 2022 season, Wright announced he was entering the NCAA transfer portal. However, he later opted not to continue his college career and entered the 2023 NFL supplemental draft. He finished his college football career with 99 catches for 1,325 yards and 10 touchdowns in 29 games. He went unselected in the Supplemental Draft.

== Professional career ==
=== Los Angeles Chargers ===
After going unselected in the Supplemental Draft, Wright was signed by the Los Angeles Chargers as an undrafted free agent on July 26, 2023. He was waived by the Chargers on August 29.

=== BC Lions ===
Wright signed with the BC Lions of the Canadian Football League on January 16, 2024. On April 2, 2024, the Lions added Wright to the retirement list, signaling the end of his professional football career.
