= Illinois–Purdue football rivalry =

American college football rivalry

- Illinois Fighting Illini Purdue Boilermakers
- First meeting: November 22, 1890; Purdue, 62–0
- Latest meeting: October 3, 2026; Purdue, 24–17
- Next meeting: 2027
- Trophy: Purdue Cannon

Statistics
- Total meetings: 102
- All-time series: Purdue leads, 49–47–6
- Trophy series: Purdue leads, 41–32–2
- Largest victory: Purdue, 62–0 (1890)
- Longest win streak: Illinois, 6 (1906–1911, 1988–1993)
- Longest unbeaten streak: Illinois, 11 (1906–1919)
- Current win streak: Purdue, 1 (2026–present)

Locations of Illinois and Purdue

The Illinois–Purdue football rivalry is an American college football rivalry between the Illinois Fighting Illini football team of the University of Illinois and Purdue Boilermakers football team of Purdue University. The Purdue Cannon is presented to the winner of the game. Purdue leads the series 49–47–6.

== History ==
It all started in 1905 when a group of Purdue students took the Cannon to Champaign in anticipation of firing it to celebrate a Boilermaker victory. Although Purdue won 29–0, Illinois supporters, including Quincy A. Hall, discovered it in a culvert by the field and took it before the Purdue students could start their "booming" celebration.

Hall later moved it to his farmhouse near Milford, Illinois, where it survived a fire and gathered dust until he suggested it be used as a trophy in the football series between the two schools when the rivalry resumed in 1943 after an 11-year lapse. It was presented at halftime to the schools' athletic directors, Doug Mills and Guy Mackey. Before the Cannon became an annual tradition, Illinois led the series 15–8–2.

The cannon is now maintained by the Tomahawk Service and Leadership Honorary at Purdue and Illini Pride.

== Game results ==
Illinois victories	Purdue victories	Tie games

No.	Date	Location	Winner	Score
1	November 22, 1890	Champaign, IL	Purdue	62–0
2	October 8, 1892	Champaign, IL	Purdue	12–6
3	November 25, 1893	West Lafayette, IN	Tie	26–26
4	November 10, 1894	Champaign, IL	Purdue	22–2
5	November 28, 1895	West Lafayette, IN	Purdue	6–2
6	November 25, 1896	West Lafayette, IN	Tie	4–4
7	October 23, 1897	Champaign, IL	Illinois	34–4
8	November 22, 1899	Champaign, IL	Purdue	5–0
9	November 3, 1900	Champaign, IL	Illinois	17–5
10	November 16, 1901	West Lafayette, IN	Illinois	28–6
11	October 18, 1902	Champaign, IL	Illinois	29–5
12	October 17, 1903	West Lafayette, IN	Illinois	24–0
13	October 22, 1904	West Lafayette, IN	Illinois	24–6
14	October 21, 1905	Champaign, IL	Purdue	29–0
15	November 25, 1906	West Lafayette, IN	Illinois	5–0
16	November 2, 1907	Champaign, IL	Illinois	14–12
17	November 14, 1908	West Lafayette, IN	Illinois	15–6
18	October 30, 1909	Champaign, IL	Illinois	14–10
19	October 29, 1910	West Lafayette, IN	Illinois	11–0
20	November 4, 1911	Champaign, IL	Illinois	12–3
21	November 9, 1912	West Lafayette, IN	Tie	9–9
22	November 15, 1913	Champaign, IL	Tie	0–0
23	October 28, 1916	West Lafayette, IN	Illinois	14–7
24	October 27, 1917	Champaign, IL	Illinois	27–0
25	October 11, 1919	West Lafayette, IN	Illinois	14–7
26	November 1, 1930	Champaign, IL	Purdue	25–0
27	October 10, 1931	West Lafayette, IN	Purdue	7–0
28	October 2, 1943	West Lafayette, IN	Purdue	40–21
29	October 7, 1944	Champaign, IL	Purdue	35–19
30	October 5, 1946	Champaign, IL	Illinois	43–7
31	October 25, 1947	West Lafayette, IN	Purdue	14–7
32	October 23, 1948	Champaign, IL	Illinois	10–6
33	October 22, 1949	West Lafayette, IN	Illinois	19–0
34	October 25, 1952	Champaign, IL	Purdue	40–12
35	October 31, 1953	Champaign, IL	#4 Illinois	21–0
36	October 30, 1954	West Lafayette, IN	#9 Purdue	28–14
37	October 29, 1955	Champaign, IL	Purdue	13–0
38	November 3, 1956	West Lafayette, IN	Tie	7–7
39	November 2, 1957	Champaign, IL	Purdue	21–6
40	November 1, 1958	West Lafayette, IN	#10 Purdue	31–8
41	October 31, 1959	Champaign, IL	Tie	7–7
42	October 29, 1960	West Lafayette, IN	Illinois	14–12
43	November 4, 1961	Champaign, IL	Purdue	23–9
44	November 3, 1962	West Lafayette, IN	Illinois	14–10
45	November 2, 1963	Champaign, IL	#2 Illinois	41–21
46	October 31, 1964	West Lafayette, IN	Purdue	26–14
47	October 30, 1965	Champaign, IL	Illinois	21–0
48	October 29, 1966	West Lafayette, IN	Purdue	25–21
49	November 4, 1967	Champaign, IL	#6 Purdue	42–9
50	November 2, 1968	West Lafayette, IN	#6 Purdue	35–17
51	November 1, 1969	Champaign, IL	#13 Purdue	49–22
52	October 31, 1970	West Lafayette, IN	Illinois	23–21

No.	Date	Location	Winner	Score
53	October 23, 1971	Champaign, IL	Illinois	21–7
54	October 28, 1972	West Lafayette, IN	Purdue	20–14
55	October 13, 1973	Champaign, IL	Illinois	15–13
56	October 12, 1974	West Lafayette, IN	Illinois	27–23
57	October 18, 1975	Champaign, IL	Purdue	26–24
58	October 16, 1976	West Lafayette, IN	Illinois	21–17
59	October 15, 1977	West Lafayette, IN	Illinois	29–22
60	October 21, 1978	Champaign, IL	#19 Purdue	13–0
61	October 13, 1979	West Lafayette, IN	#20 Purdue	28–14
62	October 18, 1980	Champaign, IL	Purdue	45–20
63	October 10, 1981	West Lafayette, IN	Purdue	44–20
64	October 9, 1982	Champaign, IL	#20 Illinois	38–34
65	October 22, 1983	West Lafayette, IN	#11 Illinois	35–21
66	October 20, 1984	Champaign, IL	Illinois	34–20
67	October 12, 1985	West Lafayette, IN	Purdue	30–24
68	October 11, 1986	Champaign, IL	Illinois	34–27
69	October 10, 1987	West Lafayette, IN	Purdue	9–3
70	October 8, 1988	Champaign, IL	Illinois	20–0
71	October 14, 1989	West Lafayette, IN	#16 Illinois	14–2
72	October 13, 1990	Champaign, IL	#11 Illinois	34–0
73	November 9, 1991	West Lafayette, IN	Illinois	41–14
74	November 7, 1992	Champaign, IL	Illinois	20–17
75	October 2, 1993	West Lafayette, IN	Illinois	28–10
76	October 1, 1994	Champaign, IL	Purdue	22–16
77	October 25, 1997	Champaign, IL	#22 Purdue	48–3
78	October 24, 1998	West Lafayette, IN	Purdue	42–9
79	November 3, 2001	West Lafayette, IN	#21 Illinois	38–13
80	October 12, 2002	Champaign, IL	Illinois	38–31^{OT}
81	October 4, 2003	West Lafayette, IN	#22 Purdue	43–10
82	September 25, 2004	Champaign, IL	#15 Purdue	38–30
83	November 12, 2005	West Lafayette, IN	Purdue	37–3
84	November 11, 2006	Champaign, IL	Purdue	42–31
85	October 24, 2009	West Lafayette, IN	Purdue	24–14
86	October 30, 2010	Champaign, IL	Illinois	44–10
87	October 22, 2011	West Lafayette, IN	Purdue	21–14
88	November 17, 2012	Champaign, IL	Purdue	20–17
89	November 23, 2013	West Lafayette, IN	Illinois	20–16
90	October 4, 2014	Champaign, IL	Purdue	38–27
91	November 7, 2015	West Lafayette, IN	Illinois	48–14
92	October 8, 2016	Champaign, IL	Purdue	34–31^{OT}
93	November 4, 2017	West Lafayette, IN	Purdue	29–10
94	October 13, 2018	Champaign, IL	Purdue	46–7
95	October 26, 2019	West Lafayette, IN	Illinois	24–6
96	October 31, 2020	Champaign, IL	Purdue	31–24
97	September 25, 2021	West Lafayette, IN	Purdue	13–9
98	November 12, 2022	Champaign, IL	Purdue	31–24
99	September 30, 2023	West Lafayette, IN	Purdue	44–19
100	October 12, 2024	Champaign, IL	#23 Illinois	50–49^{OT}
101	October 4, 2025	West Lafayette, IN	#22 Illinois	43–27
102	October 3, 2026	Champaign, IL	Purdue	24–17
Series: Purdue leads 49–47–6

== See also ==
- List of NCAA college football rivalry games
- List of most-played college football series in NCAA Division I
