= Cory Trice =

American football player (born 2000)

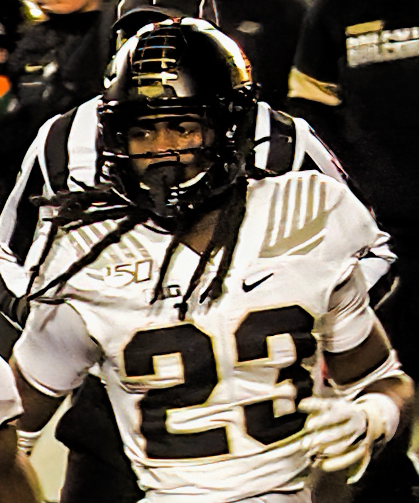
- Trice with the Purdue Boilermakers in 2019

Profile
- Position: Cornerback

Personal information
- Born: May 30, 2000 (age 26); Hopkinsville, Kentucky, U.S.
- Listed height: 6 ft 3 in (1.91 m)
- Listed weight: 206 lb (93 kg)

Career information
- High school: Christian County (Christian County, Kentucky)
- College: Purdue (2018–2022)
- NFL draft: 2023: 7th round, 241st overall pick

Career history
- Pittsburgh Steelers (2023–2025)

Career NFL statistics as of 2025
- Tackles: 21
- Pass deflections: 2
- Interceptions: 1
- Stats at Pro Football Reference

Cory Carlisle Trice Jr. (born May 30, 2000) is an American professional football cornerback. He played college football for the Purdue Boilermakers.

== Early life ==
Trice attended Christian County High School in Christian County, Kentucky. As a senior, he was the Southern Pennyrile Football Athlete of the Year. He committed to Purdue University to play college football.

== College career ==
Trice played at Purdue from 2018 to 2022. After starting his career as a safety, he was moved to cornerback in 2019. Trice played in only two games in 2021 due to a torn anterior cruciate ligament (ACL) in his left knee. In 2022, he was an All-Big Ten Honorable Mention selection. During his college career, he had 106 tackles, five interceptions and two touchdowns.

== Professional career ==
Pre-draft measurables
Height	Weight	Arm length	Hand span	Wingspan	40-yard dash	10-yard split	20-yard split	20-yard shuttle	Three-cone drill	Vertical jump	Broad jump	Bench press
6 ft 3 3/8 in (1.91 m)	206 lb (93 kg)	32 3/8 in (0.82 m)	9 3/4 in (0.25 m)	6 ft 5 in (1.96 m)	4.47 s	1.56 s	2.65 s	4.06 s	6.70 s	35.5 in (0.90 m)	11 ft 0 in (3.35 m)	17 reps
All values from NFL Combine/Pro Day

Trice was selected by the Pittsburgh Steelers in the seventh round with the 241st overall pick in the 2023 NFL draft and on May 11, 2023, he signed his rookie contract. He was placed on injured reserve on August 2, after suffering a torn ACL in his right knee.

Trice made his NFL debut in Week 1 of the 2024 NFL season. In Week 2, on September 15, 2024, Trice recorded his first NFL interception, off Denver Broncos quarterback Bo Nix in a 13–6 Steelers win. On September 24, Trice was placed on injured reserve due to a hamstring injury. He was activated off injured reserve on December 5.

Trice was placed on injured reserve/designated for return on August 26, 2025, due to a hamstring injury. On November 19, Pittsburgh elected not to activate Trice due to a knee injury, and he reverted to season-ending injured reserve.

Trice was waived with a failed injury designation on May 12, 2026.

== Personal life ==
His father, Cory Trice Sr., was shot and killed in 2010.
