= 2017 Purdue Boilermakers football team =

American college football season

2017 Purdue Boilermakers football

Foster Farms Bowl champion

Foster Farms Bowl, W 38–35 vs. Arizona
- Conference: Big Ten Conference
- West Division
- Record: 7–6 (4–5 Big Ten)
- Head coach: Jeff Brohm (1st season)
- Co-offensive coordinators: Brian Brohm (1st season); Tony Levine (1st season)
- Offensive scheme: Spread
- Co-defensive coordinators: Nick Holt (1st season); Anthony Poindexter (1st season)
- Base defense: 4–3
- Captains: Offensive captains; Kirk Barron; David Blough; Gregory Phillips; Defensive captains; Ja'Whaun Bentley; Danny Ezechukwu; Da'Wan Hunte
- Home stadium: Ross–Ade Stadium

2017 Big Ten Conference football standings
	Conf.			Overall
Team	W		L	W		L
East Division
No. 5 Ohio State xy$	8	–	1	12	–	2
No. 15 Michigan State	7	–	2	10	–	3
No. 8 Penn State	7	–	2	11	–	2
Michigan	5	–	4	8	–	5
Rutgers	3	–	6	4	–	8
Indiana	2	–	7	5	–	7
Maryland	2	–	7	4	–	8
West Division
No. 7 Wisconsin xy	9	–	0	13	–	1
No. 17 Northwestern	7	–	2	10	–	3
Iowa	4	–	5	8	–	5
Purdue	4	–	5	7	–	6
Nebraska	3	–	6	4	–	8
Minnesota	2	–	7	5	–	7
Illinois	0	–	9	2	–	10
Championship: Ohio State 27, Wisconsin 21
$ – Conference champion; x – Division champion/co-champions; y – Championship game participant; Rankings from AP Poll

The 2017 Purdue Boilermakers football team represented Purdue University in the 2017 NCAA Division I FBS football season. The Boilermakers competed as members of the West Division of the Big Ten Conference and played their home games at Ross–Ade Stadium in West Lafayette, Indiana. They were led by first-year head coach Jeff Brohm. They finished the season 7–6, 4–5 in Big Ten play to finish in a tie for third place in the West Division. They received a bid to the Foster Farms Bowl, their first bowl game since 2012, where they beat Arizona.

== Before the season ==
On October 16, 2016, Darrell Hazell was fired with a 3–3 mid-season record. Gerad Parker was named the interim head coach for the remainder of the season, going 0–6. On December 5, 2016, nine days after the season ended, Purdue hired Jeff Brohm as head coach. He had been the head coach at Western Kentucky the previous three seasons.

On December 8, 2016, Brohm made his first official hire with JaMarcus Shephard joining the Purdue staff after serving as the wide receivers coach at Washington State in 2016. Shepard had worked with Brohm at Western Kentucky the 3 seasons prior to 2016. On December 31, 2016, Brohm hired Tony Levine to be Purdue's co-offensive coordinator, special teams coordinator and tight ends coach, the same jobs he had held under Brohm at Western Kentucky. On January 2, 2017, Brohm announced that he had hired, Brian Brohm, Nick Holt, Reggie Johnson, Anthony Poindexter and Dale Williams as assistant coaches.

=== Spring Game ===
The 2017 Purdue Spring Game took place in West Lafayette, Indiana at 1:00 pm on April 8, 2017.

Date	Time	Spring Game	Site	TV	Result	Attendance
April 8	1:00 pm	Offense vs. Defense	Ross–Ade Stadium • West Lafayette, IN	BTN	Defense 45–30	6,006

== Recruiting ==
=== Position key ===
Back	B	Center	C	Cornerback	CB	Defensive back	DB
Defensive end	DE	Defensive lineman	DL	Defensive tackle	DT	End	E
Fullback	FB	Guard	G	Halfback	HB	Kicker	K
Kickoff returner	KR	Offensive tackle	OT	Offensive lineman	OL	Linebacker	LB
Long snapper	LS	Punter	P	Punt returner	PR	Quarterback	QB
Running back	RB	Safety	S	Tight end	TE	Wide receiver	WR

=== Recruits ===
Purdue's recruiting class consisted of 24 recruits, including six that enrolled early. Purdue's recruiting class was ranked 77th by Scout, 68th by Rivals, 71st by 247Sports.com, and 59th by ESPN.

College recruiting (2017)
Name	Hometown	School	Height	Weight	Commit date
Jacob Abrams; DB	Carmel, Indiana	Carmel HS	6 ft 2 in (1.88 m)	193 lb (88 kg)	Dec 11, 2016
Jacob Abrams; DB	Recruit ratings: Scout: Rivals: 247Sports: ESPN:				
Griffin Alstott; QB	St. Petersburg, Florida	Northside Christian School	6 ft 2 in (1.88 m)	195 lb (88 kg)	Mar 25, 2016
Griffin Alstott; QB	Recruit ratings: Scout: Rivals: 247Sports: ESPN:				
Derrick Barnes; LB	Covington, Kentucky	Holy Cross HS	6 ft 2 in (1.88 m)	225 lb (102 kg)	Jan 31, 2017
Derrick Barnes; LB	Recruit ratings: Scout: Rivals: 247Sports: ESPN:				
Viktor Beach; OL	Fort Myers, Florida	Bishop Verot HS	6 ft 5 in (1.96 m)	285 lb (129 kg)	Jan 22, 2017
Viktor Beach; OL	Recruit ratings: Scout: Rivals: 247Sports: ESPN:				
Keyron Catlett; ATH	Hopkinsville, Kentucky	Christian County HS	5 ft 10 in (1.78 m)	180 lb (82 kg)	Jan 30, 2017
Keyron Catlett; ATH	Recruit ratings: Scout: Rivals: 247Sports: ESPN:				
Allen Daniels; DT	Dacula, Georgia	Dacula HS	6 ft 2 in (1.88 m)	280 lb (130 kg)	Jan 29, 2017
Allen Daniels; DT	Recruit ratings: Scout: Rivals: 247Sports: ESPN:				
D'Jaundrae Edwards; WR	West Palm Beach, Florida	Palm Beach Lakes Community HS	6 ft 2 in (1.88 m)	180 lb (82 kg)	Dec 30, 2016
D'Jaundrae Edwards; WR	Recruit ratings: Scout: Rivals: 247Sports: ESPN:				
Tyler Hamilton; WR	Hilton Head, South Carolina	Hilton Head HS	5 ft 9 in (1.75 m)	160 lb (73 kg)	Nov 22, 2016
Tyler Hamilton; WR	Recruit ratings: Scout: Rivals: 247Sports: ESPN:				
Kai Higgins; DE	Pomona, California	Chaffey College	6 ft 4 in (1.93 m)	245 lb (111 kg)	Dec 14, 2016
Kai Higgins; DE	Recruit ratings: Scout: Rivals: 247Sports: ESPN:				
Giovanni Hightower-Reviere; DE	Chattanooga, Tennessee	The McCallie School	6 ft 4 in (1.93 m)	224 lb (102 kg)	Dec 24, 2016
Giovanni Hightower-Reviere; DE	Recruit ratings: Scout: Rivals: 247Sports: ESPN:				
Jalen Jackson; OL	Powder Springs, Georgia	McEachern HS	6 ft 3 in (1.91 m)	255 lb (116 kg)	Dec 12, 2016
Jalen Jackson; OL	Recruit ratings: Scout: Rivals: 247Sports: ESPN:				
T. J. Jallow; DB	Olive Branch, Mississippi	East Mississippi C.C.	6 ft 2 in (1.88 m)	210 lb (95 kg)	Dec 14, 2016
T. J. Jallow; DB	Recruit ratings: Scout: Rivals: 247Sports: ESPN:				
Cornell Jones; LB	Miami, Florida	Miami Central HS	6 ft 2 in (1.88 m)	225 lb (102 kg)	Feb 1, 2017
Cornell Jones; LB	Recruit ratings: Scout: Rivals: 247Sports: ESPN:				
Tobias Larry; LB	Lakeland, Florida	Kathleen HS	6 ft 2 in (1.88 m)	190 lb (86 kg)	Feb 1, 2017
Tobias Larry; LB	Recruit ratings: Scout: Rivals: 247Sports: ESPN:				
Dedrick Mackey; DB	Miami, Florida	Booker T. Washington HS	5 ft 11 in (1.80 m)	165 lb (75 kg)	Aug 10, 2016
Dedrick Mackey; DB	Recruit ratings: Scout: Rivals: 247Sports: ESPN:				
Kenneth Major; DB	Hopkinsville, Kentucky	Christian County HS	6 ft 0 in (1.83 m)	185 lb (84 kg)	Jan 29, 2017
Kenneth Major; DB	Recruit ratings: Scout: Rivals: 247Sports: ESPN:				
Robert McWilliams; LB	Coral Gables, Florida	Coral Gables Senior HS	6 ft 4 in (1.93 m)	200 lb (91 kg)	Feb 1, 2017
Robert McWilliams; LB	Recruit ratings: Scout: Rivals: 247Sports: ESPN:				
Darius Pittman; TE	Bay St. Louis, Mississippi	Saint Stanislaus College	6 ft 3 in (1.91 m)	225 lb (102 kg)	Dec 13, 2016
Darius Pittman; TE	Recruit ratings: Scout: Rivals: 247Sports: ESPN:				
Ethan Smart; OL	Southaven, Mississippi	Northeastern Mississippi C.C.	6 ft 6 in (1.98 m)	290 lb (130 kg)	Dec 11, 2016
Ethan Smart; OL	Recruit ratings: Scout: Rivals: 247Sports: ESPN:				
Nicholas Sipe; QB	Villa Park, California	Villa Park HS	6 ft 4 in (1.93 m)	190 lb (86 kg)	Jun 18, 2016
Nicholas Sipe; QB	Recruit ratings: Scout: Rivals: 247Sports: ESPN:				
Mark Strickford; OL	Carmel, Indiana	Carmel HS	6 ft 6 in (1.98 m)	250 lb (110 kg)	Oct 1, 2016
Mark Strickford; OL	Recruit ratings: Scout: Rivals: 247Sports: ESPN:				
DeShon Washington; OL	Louisville, Kentucky	Ballard HS	6 ft 5 in (1.96 m)	275 lb (125 kg)	Jan 28, 2017
DeShon Washington; OL	Recruit ratings: Scout: Rivals: 247Sports: ESPN:				
Terry Wright; WR	Memphis, Tennessee	Coffeyville C.C.	6 ft 0 in (1.83 m)	170 lb (77 kg)	Jan 29, 2017
Terry Wright; WR	Recruit ratings: Scout: Rivals: 247Sports: ESPN:				
Isaac Zico; WR	Villa Rica, Georgia	Georgia Military College	6 ft 0 in (1.83 m)	190 lb (86 kg)	Jan 26, 2017
Isaac Zico; WR	Recruit ratings: Scout: Rivals: 247Sports: ESPN:				
Overall recruit ranking: Scout: 77th Rivals: 68th 247Sports: 71st ESPN: 59th
Note: In many cases, Scout, Rivals, 247Sports, On3, and ESPN may conflict in their listings of height and weight.; In these cases, the average was taken. ESPN grades are on a 100-point scale.; Sources: "Purdue Football Commitments". Rivals.; "2017 Purdue Football Commits". Scout.; "ESPN". ESPN.; "Scout.com Team Recruiting Rankings". Scout.; "2017 Team Ranking". Rivals.com.; "2017 Purdue Boilermakers football team". 247Sports.

== Schedule and results ==
Date	Time	Opponent	Site	TV	Result	Attendance
September 2	7:30 p.m.	vs. No. 16 Louisville*	Lucas Oil Stadium; Indianapolis, IN (Ally Classic)	FOX	L 28–35	37,394
September 8	8:00 p.m.	Ohio*	Ross–Ade Stadium; West Lafayette, IN	FS1	W 44–21	45,633
September 16	4:00 p.m.	at Missouri*	Faurot Field; Columbia, MO	SECN	W 35–3	53,262
September 23	4:00 p.m.	No. 8 Michigan^{†}	Ross–Ade Stadium; West Lafayette, IN	FOX	L 10–28	60,042
October 7	3:30 p.m.	Minnesota	Ross–Ade Stadium; West Lafayette, IN	ESPN2	W 31–17	42,085
October 14	3:30 p.m.	at No. 7 Wisconsin	Camp Randall Stadium; Madison, WI	BTN	L 9–17	78,580
October 21	12:00 p.m.	at Rutgers	High Point Solutions Stadium; Piscataway, NJ	BTN	L 12–14	38,278
October 28	7:30 p.m.	Nebraska	Ross–Ade Stadium; West Lafayette, IN	BTN	L 24–25	41,411
November 4	12:00 p.m.	Illinois	Ross–Ade Stadium; West Lafayette, IN (Purdue Cannon)	BTN	W 29–10	46,027
November 11	7:00 p.m.	at No. 25 Northwestern	Ryan Field; Evanston, IL	ESPN2	L 13–23	33,765
November 18	3:30 p.m.	at Iowa	Kinnick Stadium; Iowa City, IA	BTN	W 24–15	60,554
November 25	12:00 p.m.	Indiana	Ross–Ade Stadium; West Lafayette, IN (Old Oaken Bucket)	ESPN2	W 31–24	52,105
December 27	8:30 p.m.	vs. Arizona*	Levi's Stadium; Santa Clara, CA (Foster Farms Bowl)	FOX	W 38–35	28,436
*Non-conference game; ^{†}Homecoming; Rankings from AP Poll released prior to the game; All times are in Eastern time

== Radio ==
Radio coverage for all games will be broadcast statewide on The Purdue Sports Network and on Sirius XM Satellite Radio. The radio announcers are Tim Newton with play-by-play, Pete Quinn with color commentary, and Kelly Kitchel with sideline reports.

== Game summaries ==
=== Vs. Louisville ===
Louisville vs Purdue

Team	1	2	3	4	Total
• No. 16 Cardinals	7	3	15	10	35
Boilermakers	7	7	7	7	28

- Date: September 2
- Location: Lucas Oil Stadium
  Indianapolis, IN
- Game start: 7:30 pm EDT
- Elapsed time: 3:50 pm
- Game attendance: 37,394
- Game weather: Indoors
- Referee: Duane Heydt
- TV announcers (FOX): Tim Brando (Play-By-Play), Spencer Tillman (Analyst), & Holly Sonders (Sideline)

Scoring summary
1	7:27	PUR	Jackson Anthrop 26-yard pass from Elijah Sindelar (J. D. Dellinger kick)	PUR 7–0
1	3:39	LOU	Jordan Smith 3-yard pass from Lamar Jackson (Blanton Creque kick)	Tied 7–7
2	14:19	LOU	Blanton Creque 23-yard field goal	LOU 10–7
2	:51	PUR	Richie Worship 8-yard pass from David Blough (J. D. Dellinger kick)	PUR 14–10
3	12:31	LOU	Blanton Creque 32-yard field goal	PUR 14–13
3	8:39	PUR	Brycen Hopkins 2-yard pass from David Blough (Spencer Evans kick)	PUR 21–13
3	5:29	LOU	Reggie Bonnafon 10-yard run (Lamar Jackson run failed)	PUR 21–19
3	3:18	LOU	Stacy Thomas 61-yard interception return (Lamar Jackson pass intercepted)	LOU 25–21
4	10:48	PUR	Jackson Anthrop 14-yard pass from Elijah Sindelar (Spencer Evans kick)	PUR 28–25
4	9:01	LOU	Dez Fitzpatrick 20-yard pass from Lamar Jackson (Blanton Creque kick)	LOU 32–28
4	4:18	LOU	Blanton Creque 30-yard field goal	LOU 35–28

To open the season, Purdue met No. 16–ranked Louisville Cardinals in a neutral-site game at Lucas Oil Stadium in Indianapolis, Indiana. The gamed first time the two teams had met in 30 years, with the 1987 game ending in a 22–22 tie. The game was Jeff Brohm's first game as the head coach as he faced his alma mater.

Purdue opened the scoring in the first quarter with a 26-yard touchdown pass from Elijah Sindelar to Jackson Anthrop. Louisville tied the game at seven with a three-yard Lamar Jackson pass to Jordan Smith, and took the lead with a 23-yard field goal by Blanton Creque. Trailing 10–7, Purdue scored again on an eight-yard David Blough pass to Richie Worship to give the Boilermakers a surprising 14–10 lead into halftime. Louisville opened up the second half scoring with a 32-yard field goal to tighten the deficit to 14–13. Purdue responded on the following drive with a Brycen Hopkins touchdown pass from Blough to give Purdue a 21–13 lead. Louisville scored on the ensuing drive with a 10-yard Reggie Bonnafon touchdown run, but the Cardinals' two-point conversion failed. Trying to respond to the Louisville touchdown, Blough was intercepted by Stacy Thomas, who returned Blough's pass 61 yards for a touchdown, but again their two-point conversion failed, giving the Cardinals a 25–21 lead. Purdue would answer however with Sindelar at QB as he threw another touchdown to Anthrop, this time from 14 yards out. With Purdue back in front 28–25 and just a little over a minute later, Louisville answered with a 20-yard Dez Fitzpatrick touchdown reception from Jackson to give the Cardinals a 32–28 lead with nine minutes remaining. Louisville concluded the scoring with a 30-yard Creque field goal with a little over four minutes remaining in the game. Purdue could not answer and fell 35–28. The loss left the Boilermakers at 0–1 on the season.

=== Vs. Ohio ===
Ohio at Purdue

Team	1	2	3	4	Total
Bobcats	7	0	7	7	21
• Boilermakers	10	24	7	3	44

- Date: September 8
- Location: Ross–Ade Stadium
  West Lafayette, IN
- Game start: 8:05 pm EDT
- Elapsed time: 3:05
- Game attendance: 45,633
- Game weather: 76 °F (24 °C), Clear, NE 6 MPH
- Referee: Luke Richmond
- TV announcers (FS1): Tim Brando, Spencer Tillman, & Holly Sonders

Scoring summary
1	12:42	PUR	Spencer Evans 36-yard field goal	PUR 3–0
1	4:21	PUR	Brycen Hopkins 17-yard pass from Elijah Sindelar (Spencer Evans kick)	PUR 10–0
1	:27	OHIO	A. J. Ouellette 4-yard run (Louie Zervos kick)	PUR 10–7
2	7:04	PUR	Tario Fuller 1-yard run (Spencer Evans kick)	PUR 17–7
2	5:19	PUR	Cole Herdman 62-yard pass from David Blough (J. D. Dellinger kick)	PUR 24–7
2	:51	PUR	J. D. Dellinger 22-yard field goal	PUR 27–7
2	:21	PUR	Anthony Mahoungou 31-yard pass from David Blough (Spencer Evans kick)	PUR 34–7
3	10:50	OHIO	Julian Ross 1-yard run (Louie Zervos kick)	PUR 34–14
3	5:45	PUR	Jackson Anthrop 5-yard pass from David Blough (J.D. Dellinger kick)	PUR 41–14
4	6:55	PUR	Spencer Evans 38-yard field goal	PUR 44–14
4	4:27	OHIO	Cameron Odom 25-yard pass from Nathan Rourke (Louie Zervos kick)	PUR 44–21

After its game against Louisville, Purdue returned home for its first home game of the season against the Ohio Bobcats on a Friday night. It marked the first meeting of the two teams since 1988. The game also marked Purdue's first home night game as new permanent lights had been installed.

Purdue opened the scoring with a 36-yard Spencer Evans field goal. Purdue increased their lead when Elijah Sindelar found Brycen Hopkins for a 17-yard touchdown pass. Ohio responded with a 4-yard A. J. Ouellette rushing touchdown to close out the first quarter scoring. David Blough again took over for Sindelar at quarterback and played well going on a 24–0 run in the second quarter to take a 34–7 lead at halftime. Purdue's scores during the run included a Tario Fuller rushing touchdown, a Cole Herdman reception, a J. D. Dellinger field goal and Anthony Mahoungou touchdown. Blough completed six of seven attempts for 172 yards and two touchdowns in the second quarter. Ohio opened the second half scoring with a 1-yard Julian Ross touchdown. Blough added a five-yard touchdown pass to Jackson Anthrop to complete the third quarter scoring. Purdue extended the lead with a 38-yard Spencer Evans field goal. Ohio concluded the scoring with a 25-yard touchdown reception by Cameron Odom from Nathan Rourke. Blough finished 11 for 13 with three touchdowns. Despite Blough's performance, Jeff Brohm said he would still continue to use both Blough and Sindelar. Tario Fuller rushed for 142 yards on 16 attempts and recorded his first career touchdown for the Boilers in the blowout. Purdue gained 558 yards on the night while limiting the Bobcats to 396 yards. The win was Jeff Brohm's first as Purdue's head coach and moved the Boilers to 1–1 on the season.

=== At Missouri ===
Purdue at Missouri

Team	1	2	3	4	Total
• Boilermakers	14	14	7	0	35
Tigers	0	3	0	0	3

- Date: September 16
- Location: Faurot Field
  Columbia, MO
- Game start: 3:01 pm EDT
- Elapsed time: 3:11
- Game attendance: 53,262
- Game weather: 89 °F (32 °C), Clear, SW
- Referee: James Carter
- TV announcers (SEC Network): Taylor Zarzour, Andre Ware & Olivia Harlan

Scoring summary
1	9:57	PUR	David Blough 5-yard run (Spencer Evans kick)	PUR 7–0
1	5:41	PUR	Tario Fuller 36-yard run (J. D. Dellinger kick)	PUR 14–0
2	11:21	PUR	Richie Worship 3-yard run (Spencer Evans kick)	PUR 21–0
2	2:20	PUR	Jackson Anthrop 5-yard pass from Elijah Sindelar (J. D. Dellinger kick)	PUR 28–0
2	:00	MO	Tucker McCann 29-yard field goal	PUR 28–3
3	12:30	PUR	Richie Worship 1-yard pass from David Blough (Spencer Evans kick)	PUR 35–3

After playing Ohio, Purdue traveled to Columbia, Missouri, to face the Missouri Tigers. This was the first meeting between the teams since the 1980 Liberty Bowl.

David Blough started his first game of the season for Purdue as they jumped out early and often against the Tigers, scoring touchdowns on their first three possessions as Blough ran for a 5-yard score, Tario Fuller scored on a 36-yard run and Richie Worship scored on a three-yard run that has the Boilermakers up 21–0 early in the first quarter. After Blough struggled to score in the second quarter, he was replaced by Elijah Sindelar who would find Jackson Anthrop on a five-yard pass to give the Boilermakers a 28-point lead with 2:20 left in the first half. The Tigers managed a field goal as the half ended with Purdue up 28–3. Another Blough touchdown pass from one yard out to Worship ended the scoring in the third quarter and gave Purdue an easy 35–3 win and moved them to 2–1 on the season. The 3 points given up by Purdue were the fewest since a September 17, 2011 shutout of Southeast Missouri State.

=== Vs. Michigan ===
Michigan at Purdue
(Homecoming game)

Team	1	2	3	4	Total
• #8 Wolverines	0	7	7	14	28
Boilermakers	0	10	0	0	10

- Date: September 23
- Location: Ross–Ade Stadium
  West Lafayette, IN
- Game start: 4:12 pm EDT
- Elapsed time: 3:28
- Game attendance: 60,042
- Game weather: 89 °F (32 °C), Clear, SE 3 MPH
- Referee: Jerry McGinn
- TV announcers (FOX): Joe Davis, Brady Quinn & Bruce Feldman

Scoring summary
2	11:34	MICH	Zach Gentry 12-yard pass from John O'Korn (Quinn Nordin kick)	MICH 7–0
2	9:45	PUR	Bryce Hopkins 10-yard pass from Elijah Sindelar (J. D. Dellinger kick)	Tie 7–7
2	6:04	PUR	J. D. Dellinger 29-yard field goal	PUR 10–7
3	2:42	MICH	Chris Evans 10-yard run (Quinn Nordin kick)	MICH 14–10
4	10:36	MICH	Ty Issac 1-yard run (Quinn Nordin kick)	MICH 21–10
4	6:46	MICH	Chris Evans 49-yard run (Quinn Nordin kick)	MICH 28–10

Following its game against Missouri, Purdue began its conference schedule when the No. 8–ranked Michigan Wolverines traveled to West Lafayette, Indiana, in Purdue's homecoming game. It was the first time the two have met since Michigan defeated Purdue, 44–13, on October 6, 2012.

Michigan defeated Purdue 28–10. After neither team scored in the first quarter, Michigan opened the scoring in the second quarter via a 12-yard touchdown pass from John O'Korn to Zach Gentry. Purdue responded with a 10-yard touchdown pass from Elijah Sindelar to Brycen Hopkins. Purdue then took their first lead of the game via a 29-yard field goal from J. D. Dellinger, which made the score 10–7 in favor of Purdue at half-time. Michigan then scored 21 unanswered points in the second half, via a 10-yard touchdown run from Chris Evans, a one-yard touchdown run from Ty Isaac, and a 49-yard touchdown run from Evans.

Michigan's defense held Purdue to 0-for-12 on third-down conversions, as Purdue did not convert a first down in the second half. Purdue was held to only 10 total yards in the second half.

=== Vs. Minnesota ===
Minnesota at Purdue

Team	1	2	3	4	Total
Golden Gophers	7	7	0	3	17
• Boilermakers	6	0	7	18	31

- Date: October 6
- Location: Ross–Ade Stadium
  West Lafayette, IN
- Game start: 3:35 pm EDT
- Elapsed time: 4:55
- Game attendance: 42,085
- Game weather: 83 °F (28 °C), Partly Cloudy, SW 17 MPH
- Referee: Ron Snodgrass
- TV announcers (ESPN2): Jason Benetti, Kelly Stouffer & Kris Budden

Scoring summary
1	12:43	PUR	Cole Herdman 20-yard pass from David Blough (Spencer Evans kick failed)	PUR 6–0
1	4:56	MIN	Tyler Johnson 3-yard pass from Conor Rhoda (Emmit Carpenter kick)	MIN 7–6
2	12:13	MIN	Brandon Lingen 2-yard pass from Conor Rhoda (Emmit Carpenter kick)	MIN 14–6
3	10:38	PUR	D. J. Knox 22-yard pass from Elijah Sindelar (J. D. Dellinger kick)	MIN 14–13
4	9:58	PUR	J. D. Dellinger 19-yard field goal	PUR 16–14
4	2:26	MIN	Emmit Carpenter 38-yard field goal	MIN 17–16
4	1:17	PUR	Markell Jones 12-yard run (Gregory Phillips pass from Elijah Sindelar)	PUR 24–17
4	0:10	PUR	Ja'Whaun Bentley 76-yard interception return (Spencer Evans kick)	PUR 31–17

After a bye week following the Michigan game, Purdue hosted the Minnesota Golden Gophers. In the previous meeting (in 2016), Minnesota defeated Purdue, 44–31. During the ensuing week before the game, Purdue lost their all-time winningest coach Joe Tiller who died at the age of 76. Both teams wore helmet decals to remembrance of Tiller.

Purdue entered the game with leading rusher Tario Fuller missing the game with an injury, as well as defensive starters Ja'Whaun Bentley and Jacob Thieneman disqualified for the first half after being ejected during the Michigan game for targeting penalties. David Blough made his third consecutive start at quarterback and found Cole Herdman on the Boilermakers first drive, but the PAT was missed by Spencer Evans. Minnesota was able to take a comfortable lead when the intercepted Blough on consecutive possessions scoring a touchdown on each with Conor Rhoda throwing passes to Tyler Johnson and Brandon Lingen. Minnesota took a 14–6 lead into halftime. Purdue opened the second half scoring with a 22-yard D. J. Knox touchdown reception from Elijah Sindelar. Purdue took the lead with 9:58 left to play on a 19-yard J. D. Dellinger field goal. Immediately following the go ahead field goal, the game went into a weather delay because of lightning in the area. After an hour and a half rain delay, play resumed and Minnesota regained the lead with 2:26 left to play on a 38-yard Emmit Carpenter field goal. Purdue scored quickly on the next possession with a 12-yard Markell Jones touchdown run. Minnesota began driving with Rhoda finding Lingen and Rashad Still for catches of 7 and 32-yards respectively. Rhoda was then intercepted by Bentley who returned the ball 76-yards for a touchdown with 10 seconds remaining.

The win was Purdue's first Big Ten Conference home victory since 2015 and Coach Brohm's first Big Ten Conference victory.

=== At Wisconsin ===
Purdue at Wisconsin

Team	1	2	3	4	Total
Boilermakers	3	3	3	0	9
• #7 Badgers	14	3	0	0	17

- Date: October 14
- Location: Camp Randall Stadium
  Madison, WI
- Game start: 2:40 pm EDT
- Elapsed time: 3:07
- Game attendance: 78,580
- Game weather: 59 °F (15 °C), Light Rain, E 9 MPH
- Referee: John O'Neill
- TV announcers (BTN): Kevin Kugler, Matt Millen & Lisa Byington

Scoring summary
1	13:35	WIS	Jonathan Taylor 67-yard run (Rafael Gaglianone kick)	WIS 7–0
1	6:12	WIS	Quintez Cephus 14-yard pass from Alex Hornibrook (Rafael Gaglianone kick)	WIS 14–0
1	1:14	PUR	Spencer Evans 36-yard field goal	WIS 14–3
2	2:38	WIS	Rafael Gaglianone 46-yard field goal	WIS 17–3
2	0:00	PUR	Spencer Evans 49-yard field goal	WIS 17–6
3	4:04	PUR	J. D. Dellinger 40-yard field goal	WIS 17–9

Following its game against Minnesota, Purdue played its second road game against the No. 7–ranked Wisconsin Badgers. Wisconsin defeated the Boilermakers in a showdown during the prior meeting, winning 49–20.

Purdue changed their starting quarterback, going with Sindelar for the third time this season. Wisconsin opened the scoring with a 67-yard touchdown run by Jonathan Taylor. Following a 3 and out by the Purdue offense, Wisconsin extended their lead with a 14-yard Quintez Cephus touchdown reception from Alex Hornibrook. Purdue was able to score before the first quarter ended with a 36-yard Evans field goal. On Wisconsin's next drive Da'Wan Hunte intercepted Hornibrook's pass but Dellinger missed a field goal to cut into Purdue's deficit. Wisconsin was then able to drive into Purdue territory for a 46-yard Rafael Gaglianone field goal. Purdue then drove, which was aided by a T. J. Edwards targeting penalty and ejection, to score on a 49-yard Evans field goal as the first half expired. After a punt by Purdue started the second half, Danny Ezechukwu intercepted a Hornibrook screen pass leading to a 40-yard Dellinger field goal. On Wisconsin's next drive, Lorenzo Neal Jr. stripped Taylor in the red zone to give Purdue a chance to tie, but Purdue was forced to punt. After the ball was returned to Purdue on a punt, Purdue began to drive and was within field goal range when Sindelar was intercepted by Leon Jacobs with 8:14 left to play. Wisconsin was able to bleed out the rest of the half to hold onto a victory.

The victory was Wisconsin's 12th consecutive victory over Purdue.

=== At Rutgers ===
Purdue at Rutgers

Team	1	2	3	4	Total
Boilermakers	0	3	3	6	12
• Scarlet Knights	7	0	7	0	14

- Date: October 21
- Location: High Point Solutions Stadium
  Piscataway, NJ
- Game start: 12:01 pm EDT
- Elapsed time: 3:17
- Game attendance: 38,278
- Game weather: 77 °F (25 °C), Sunny, SW 1 MPH
- Referee: Jeff Servinski
- TV announcers (BTN): Kevin Kugler, Matt Millen & Lisa Byington

Scoring summary
1	12:23	RUT	Gus Edwards 74-yard run (Andrew Harte kick)	RUT 7–0
2	12:05	PUR	Spencer Evans 26-yard field goal	RUT 7–3
3	8:02	RUT	Raheem Blackshear 35-yard reception from Giovanni Rescigno (Andrew Harte kick)	RUT 14–3
3	3:20	PUR	J. D. Dellinger 24-yard field goal	RUT 14–6
4	0:25	PUR	Anthony Mahoungou 10-yard pass from David Blough (Blough pass failed)	RUT 14–12

Following its game at Wisconsin, Purdue traveled to Piscataway, New Jersey to face the Rutgers Scarlet Knights. This was the first ever meeting between the two teams.

After forcing a Purdue punt, on their second play from scrimmage, Gus Edwards broke an inside handoff for a 74-yard touchdown run. After two exchanges of punts by both teams, Purdue finally scored on their fourth drive of the game with a 26-yard Spencer Evans field goal. Purdue would end their next four possessions on downs, a punt, an interception and the end of the half. Rutgers would hold on to their 7–3 lead going into the half. On the second possession of the second half for Rutgers, the offense picked up and Giovanni Rescigno found Raheem Blackshear on a wheel route and Blackshear shook Navon Mosely to increase the Scarlet Knights' lead to 14–3. Purdue responded on the following drive with a 24-yard J. D. Dellinger field goal. After another exchanging of punts, Purdue was stopped on 4th down on the Rutgers' 30-yard line instead of kicking a field goal. With Sindelar throwing a second interception, Purdue turned to Blough who lead Purdue to a 70-yard scoring drive capped with a 10-yard Anthony Mahoungou touchdown reception, but Blough's two-point attempt was dropped in the endzone, sealing the Scarlet Knights victory.

=== Nebraska ===
Nebraska Cornhuskers (3–4) at Purdue Boilermakers (3–4)

Quarter	1	2	3	4	Total
Nebraska	3	3	6	13	25
Purdue	0	14	3	7	24

at Ross–Ade Stadium, West Lafayette, Indiana

- Date: October 28
- Game time: 7:40 p.m.
- Game weather: Cloudy, 38 °F (3 °C)
- Game attendance: 41,411
- Referee: Don Willard
- TV announcers (BTN): Brandon Gaudin, Glen Mason, and Michelle McMahon
- Box Score

Game information

First quarter

- NEB – Drew Brown 44-yard field goal, 11:42. Nebraska 3–0. Drive: 5 plays, 37 yards, 2:11.

Second quarter

- PUR – Richie Worship 4-yard run (J.D. Dellinger kick), 12:30. Purdue 7–3. Drive: 5 plays, 45 yards, 1:38.
- NEB – Drew Brown 21-yard field goal, 7:04. Purdue 7–6. Drive: 11 plays, 65 yards, 5:26.
- PUR – David Blough 5-yard run (Spencer Evans kick), 0:24. Purdue 14–6. Drive: 12 plays, 86 yards, 3:52.

Third quarter

- NEB – Drew Brown 37-yard field goal, 9:57. Purdue 14–9. Drive: 9 plays, 55 yards, 5:03.
- PUR – Spencer Evans 20-yard field goal, 6:24. Purdue 17–9. Drive: 11 plays, 71 yards, 3:33.
- NEB – Drew Brown 25-yard field goal, 2:06. Purdue 17–12. Drive: 10 plays, 67 yards, 4:18.

Fourth quarter

- PUR – Jackson Anthrop 14-yard pass from David Blough (J.D. Dellinger kick), 14:23. Purdue 24–12. Drive: 8 plays, 57 yards, 2:43.
- NEB – Tyler Hoppes 27-yard pass from Tanner Lee (Drew Brown kick), 11:03. Purdue 24–19. Drive: 7 plays, 70 yards, 3:20.
- NEB – Stanley Morgan Jr. 13-yard pass from Tanner Lee (pass failed), 0:14. Nebraska 25–24. Drive: 8 plays, 70 yards, 1:08.

Top passers

- NEB – Tanner Lee – 32/50, 431 yards, 2 TD
- PUR – David Blough – 16/28, 164 yards, TD

Top rushers

- NEB – Jaylin Bradley – 7 rushes, 42 yards
- PUR – Richie Worship – 18 rushes, 89 yards, TD

Top receivers

- NEB – Stanley Morgan Jr. – 6 receptions, 112 yards, TD
- PUR – Jackson Anthrop – 6 receptions, 55 yards, TD

After facing Wisconsin, Purdue returned home and host its in-division rival, the Nebraska Cornhuskers. The previous year, Nebraska defeated Purdue 27–14.

Nebraska opened the scoring with a 44-yard Drew Brown field goal in the first quarter. Purdue took the lead after a 4-yard Richie Worship touchdown to open scoring in the second quarter. Brown and the Cornhuskers scored again with a 21-yard field goal. After an exchanging of punts, Purdue drove 86 yards in 3:52 ending with a 5-yard David Blough rush with 24 seconds remaining in the half. Nebraska scored first in the second half on a 37-yard field goal. Purdue responded on their next drive with a Spencer Evans field goal. On the ensuing drive, Brown added another field goal, cutting Purdue's lead to 5. Jackson Anthrop scored on a 14-yard pass from Blough on their next drive, increasing their lead to 12. Nebraska responded with a Tanner Lee touchdown pass to Tyler Hoppes from 27 yards out. After another series of punts from both teams, Purdue stopped Nebraska on downs with 3:44 left in the 4th quarter. Purdue then obtained a first down on two runs by D. J. Knox. Purdue was stopped on their next three downs, with a timeout coming from Nebraska after each of the first two and another by Purdue just before the play clock expired. Nebraska took over with 1:22 left on the clock with zero timeouts. Lee completed passes of 7, 17, 11 and 6–yards with Nebraska getting out of bounds of each of the plays. Purdue tackled J. D. Spielman in bounds, and after a rushed snap and play call, Lee threw his first completion of the drive to stop the clock, setting up 3rd and 4. On the next play, Lee found Stanley Morgan Jr. from 13 yards out for a touchdown with just 0:14 remaining. The two-point conversion failed. Purdue then found Anthony Mahoungou for a first down and called timeout. Now 69 yards away from a touchdown, Blough found Knox for 25 yards, who stepped out of bounds after the game clock had expired.

=== Vs. Illinois ===
Illinois at Purdue
(Purdue Cannon)

Team	1	2	3	4	Total
Fighting Illini	7	3	0	0	10
• Boilermakers	7	6	3	13	29

- Date: November 4
- Location: Ross–Ade Stadium
  West Lafayette, IN
- Game start: 12:01 pm EDT
- Elapsed time: 3:17
- Game attendance: 46,027
- Game weather: 48 °F (9 °C), Cloudy, S 5 MPH
- Referee: Mark Kluczynski
- TV announcers (BTN): Cory Provus & J. Leman

Scoring summary
1	10:24	PUR	D. J. Knox 33-yard run (Spencer Evans kick)	PUR 7–0
1	4:34	ILL	Louis Dorsey 8-yard pass from Jeff George Jr. (Chase McLaughlin kick)	TIED 7–7
2	12:30	PUR	J. D. Dellinger 26-yard field goal	PUR 10–7
2	1:06	ILL	Chase McLaughlin 31-yard field goal	TIED 10–10
2	0:00	PUR	Spencer Evans 42-yard field goal	PUR 13–10
3	3:47	PUR	J. D. Dellinger 30-yard field goal	PUR 16–10
4	11:37	PUR	Cole Herdman 3-yard pass from Elijah Sindelar (Jared Sparks rush failed)	PUR 22–10
4	6:12	PUR	Richie Worship 1-yard run (J. D. Dellinger kick)	PUR 29–10

After facing Nebraska, Purdue hosted its rival, the Illinois Fighting Illini. The previous year, Purdue defeated Illinois 34–31 in overtime to win the Purdue Cannon, and kept the trophy by again defeating Illinois 29–10.

=== At Northwestern ===
Purdue at Northwestern

Team	1	2	3	4	Total
Boilermakers	0	0	7	6	13
• Wildcats	0	14	6	3	23

- Date: November 11
- Location: Ryan Field
  Evanston, IL
- Game start: 6:10 pm EST
- Elapsed time: 3:24
- Game attendance: 33,765
- Game weather: 36 °F (2 °C), Cloudy, S 9 MPH
- Referee: Daniel Capron
- TV announcers (ESPN2): Beth Mowins, Anthony Becht & Rocky Boiman

Scoring summary
2	9:45	NU	Clayton Thorson 4-yard run (Charlie Kuhbander kick)	NU 7–0
2	0:16	NU	Bennett Skowronek 11-yard pass from Clayton Thorson (Charlie Kuhbander kick)	NU 14–0
3	9:10	NU	Charlie Kuhbander 19-yard field goal	NU 17–0
3	5:30	NU	Charlie Kuhbander 24-yard field goal	NU 20–0
3	2:26	PUR	Jarrett Burgess 21-yard pass from Elijah Sindelar (Spencer Evans kick)	NU 20–7
4	11:49	NU	Charlie Kuhbander 36-yard field goal	NU 23–7
4	5:32	PUR	Anthony Mahoungou 12-yard pass from Elijah Sindelar (two-point pass conversion failed)	NU 23–13

After hosting Illinois, Purdue traveled to Evanston, Illinois, to face the Northwestern Wildcats. In the 2016 match-up, Purdue was defeated 45–17 by the Wildcats. and lost a much closer contest 23–13.

=== At Iowa ===
Purdue at Iowa

Team	1	2	3	4	Total
• Boilermakers	7	0	14	3	24
Hawkeyes	0	9	0	6	15

- Date: November 18
- Location: Kinnick Stadium
  Iowa City, IA
- Game start: 3:40 pm EST
- Elapsed time: 2:03
- Game attendance: 60,554
- Game weather: 42 °F (6 °C), Partly Sunny, NW 20 MPH
- Referee: Jeff Servinski
- TV announcers (BTN): Kevin Kugler, Matt Millen & Lisa Byington

Scoring summary
1	8:01	PUR	D. J. Knox 5-yard pass from Elijah Sindelar (J. D. Dellinger kick)	PUR 7–0
2	10:44	IOWA	Nathan Bazata safety	PUR 7–2
2	6:07	IOWA	Akrum Wadley 2-yard run (Miguel Recinos kick)	IOWA 9–7
3	14:03	PUR	Anthony Mahoungou 42-yard pass from Elijah Sindelar (Spencer Evans kick)	PUR 14–9
3	11:59	PUR	Anthony Mahoungou 16-yard pass from Elijah Sindelar (J. D. Dellinger kick)	PUR 21–9
4	3:55	PUR	J. D. Dellinger 27-yard field goal	PUR 24–9
4	1:04	IOWA	Noah Fant 6-yard pass from Nate Stanley (Stanley pass failed)	PUR 24–15

Following its game against Northwestern, Purdue played its final road game against Iowa Hawkeyes. Iowa had defeated the Boilermakers in a showdown the previous season, but Purdue shocked the Hawkeyes winning 24–15.

=== Indiana ===
Indiana at Purdue
(Old Oaken Bucket)

Team	1	2	3	4	Total
Hoosiers	7	3	0	14	24
• Boilermakers	7	14	3	7	31

- Date: November 25
- Location: Ross–Ade Stadium
  West Lafayette, IN
- Game attendance: 52,105
- Television network: ESPN2

Scoring summary
1	12:08	PUR	Jackson Anthrop 5-yard run (Spencer Evans kick)	PUR 7–0
1	4:14	IU	Simmie Cobbs Jr. 1-yard pass from Richard Lagow (Griffin Oakes kick)	TIE 7–7
2	4:49	PUR	Jackson Anthrop 4-yard run (J.D. Dellinger kick)	PUR 14–7
2	0:53	PUR	Anthony Mahoungou 49-yard pass from Elijah Sindelar (J.D. Dellinger kick)	PUR 21–7
2	0:08	IU	Griffin Oakes 22-yard field goal	PUR 21–10
3	1:11	PUR	J.D. Dellinger 26-yard field goal	PUR 24–10
4	12:32	PUR	Isaac Zico 4-yard pass from Elijah Sindelar (J.D. Dellinger kick)	PUR 31–10
4	5:50	IU	Taysir Mack 4-yard pass from Richard Lagow (Griffin Oakes kick)	PUR 31–17
4	1:01	IU	Whop Philyor 9-yard pass from Richard Lagow (Griffin Oakes kick)	PUR 31–24

Following its road finale against Iowa, Purdue faced its arch-rivals, the Indiana Hoosiers, in the 120th meeting of the "Old Oaken Bucket". This game marked the first time in the history of the rivalry that both teams played each other with the winner becoming bowl eligible. Purdue triumphed in an exciting game 31–24.

== Roster ==
2017 Purdue Boilermakers football team roster
Players
Coaches
Offense

Pos.	#	Name	Class
RB	1	D. J. Knox	Jr
QB	2	Elijah Sindelar	So
WR	3	D. J. Edwards	Fr
QB	5	Griffin Alstott	Fr
WR	6	Tyler Hamilton	Fr
WR	7	Isaac Zico	Jr
RB	8	Markell Jones	Jr
WR	9	Terry Wright	Jr
WR	10	Gregory Phillips (C)	Sr
QB	11	David Blough (C)	Jr
QB, WR	12	Jared Sparks	Fr
QB	13	Aidan O'Connell	Fr
QB	14	Danny Carollo	Fr
QB	17	Nick Sipe	Fr
WR	18	KeyRon Catlatt	Fr
QB	18	Cameron Northern	Fr
QB	19	Aaron Banks	Jr
WR	20	Benaiah Franklin	Fr
WR	21	Anthony Mahoungou	Sr
RB	25	Tario Fuller	So
RB	26	Carter McGinnis	Fr
RB	32	Jack Wegher	So
WR	33	Jackson Anthrop	Fr
RB	34	Richie Worship	So
RB	37	Brian Lankford-Johnson	So
RB	40	Alexander Horvath	Fr
RB	45	Lane Beeler	Jr
OL	50	Bearooz Yacoobi	Jr
OL	51	Bryce Brown	Fr
OT	52	Tanner Hawthorne	Fr
C	53	Kirk Barron (C)	Jr
OL	55	Michael Mendez	So
OL	56	Viktor Beach	Fr
OL	58	Ryan Flaherty	Fr
OL	60	Eric Swingler	Jr
OL	64	Eric Ferguson	Fr
OL	65	Marc Rolland	Fr
OL	68	Peyton Truitt	So
OL	70	Dave Steinmetz	Sr
OL	71	Sam Loebig	Fr
OL	72	Jalen Jackson	Fr
OL	73	Ethan Smart	Jr
OL	74	Graham Keller	Fr
OL	75	Shane Evans	Jr
OL	76	Mark Stickford	Fr
OL	77	D. J. Washington	Fr
OL	78	Grant Hermanns	Fr
OL	79	Matt McCann	So
WR	80	Jarrett Burgess	Jr
TE	81	Darius Pittman	Fr
TE	82	Wade Buckman	Fr
WR	83	Malcolm Dotson	So
TE	84	Jess Trussell	So
WR	86	Noah Ellison	Fr
WR	87	Ryan James	Fr
TE	88	Cole Herdman	Jr
TE	89	Brycen Hopkins	So

Defense

Pos.	#	Name	Class
CB	1	Dedrick Mackey	Fr
CB	2	Da'Wan Hunte (C)	Sr
CB	3	Kamal Hardy	Sr
LB	4	Ja'Whaun Bentley (C)	Sr
S	5	T. J. Jallow	Jr
LB	6	T. J. McCollum	Sr
DT	7	Eddy Wilson	Jr
CB	8	Josh Okonye	Sr
DT	9	Lorenzo Neal	So
CB	10	Michael Little	So
DE	11	Antoine Miles	Sr
DE	13	Gelen Robinson	Sr
CB	14	Antonio Blackmon	Jr
LB	16	Garret Hudson	Sr
LB	17	Cornell Jones	Fr
CB	20	Kenneth Major	Fr
LB	21	Markus Bailey	So
LB	22	Sawyer Dawson	So
CB	23	Josh Hayes	So
CB	24	Tim Cason	Jr
CB	25	Brandon Shuman	So
S	26	C. J. Parker (injured)	Sr
S	27	Navon Mosley	So
CB	28	Josh Abrams	Fr
CB	29	Simeon Smiley	Fr
LB	30	Tobias Larry	Fr
DE	31	Robert McWilliams III	Fr
LB	34	Jonah Williams	Fr
S	35	Wes Cook	Sr
LB	36	Danny Ezechukwu (C)	Sr
S	38	Brennan Theineman	Fr
LB	39	Zach Randall	Fr
S	40	Ronnie Hill	So
S	41	Jacob Theineman	Jr
CB	42	David Day	So
S	43	Andy Chelf	So
DT	44	Anthony Watts	Fr
DE	45	Austin Larkin	Sr
CB	46	Race Johnson	Sr
LB	48	Rob Simmons	Jr
S	49	Dennis Johnson	Fr
DT	50	Keiwan Jones (injured)	Jr
DE	54	Mike Zeigler	Jr
LB	55	Derrick Barnes	Fr
LB	57	Semisi Fakasiieiki	Fr
DT	66	Alex Criddle	So
DT	90	Will Colmery (injured)	Jr
DE	91	Chazmyn Turner	So
DE	92	Giovanni Reviere	Fr
DT	94	Allen Daniels	Fr
DT	96	Ray Ellis	Jr
DE	98	Kai Higgins	So

Special teams

Pos.	#	Name	Class
K	13	Spencer Evans	Jr
P	31	Joe Schopper	Jr
K	38	Zac Collins	Fr
K	42	Ben Bravo	Jr
K	43	Myles Homan	So
LS	47	Ben Makowski	Jr
LS	48	Ryan Sadkowski	Jr
K	85	J. D. Dellinger	So
P	96	Jake Herr	So
LS	97	Brooks Royal	Fr

Head coach

- Jeff Brohm

Coordinators/assistant coaches

- Brian Brohm (co-offensive coordinator /
  quarterbacks)
- Nick Holt (co-defensive coordinator /
  linebackers)
- Tony Levine (special teams coordinator /
  Co-offensive coordinator /
  tight ends)
- Anthony Poindexter (co-defensive coordinator /
  safeties)
- JaMarcus Shephard (passing game coordinator /
  wide receivers)
- Chris Barclay (running backs)
- Derrick Jackson (cornerbacks)
- Reggie Johnson (defensive line)
- Dale Williams (offensive line)
- Dan Row (defensive quality control)
- Ryan Wallace (quality control)
- Kevin Wolthausen (quality control)
- Justin Lovett (director of strength and conditioning)
- Domenic Reno (Senior Associate Director of Football
  Strength and conditioning)
- Dennis Love (Associate Director of Football
  Strength and conditioning)
- Jeff Eaton (Assistant Director of Football
  Strength and conditioning)
- Chris Giacchino (Assistant Director of Football
  Strength and conditioning)
- Mike Cassity (director of high school relations)
- Don Dunn (director of player personnel)
- Sean Pugh (director of player development)
- Greg Brohm (executive director of administration
  and operations / chief of staff)
- Robert Sampson (director of internal relations)
- JMichael Jonard (offensive graduate assistant)
- Joe Montag (defensive graduate assistant)
- Sean Robinson (defensive graduate assistant)
- Justin Sinz (offensive graduate assistant)

Legend

- (C) Team captain
- (S) Suspended
- (I) Ineligible
- Injured
- Redshirt

Roster
Last update: September 28, 2017

== Statistics ==
=== Team ===
	Team	Opp
Scoring	328	267
Points per game	25.5	20.5
First downs	282	250
Rushing	114	88
Passing	144	138
Penalty	24	24
Total offense	5240	4881
Avg per play	5.6	5.3
Avg per game	403.1	375.5
Fumbles-Lost	15–6	14–11
Penalties-Yards	75–658	90–778
Avg per game	50.6	59.8

	Team	Opp
Punts-Yards	73-2953	87-3372
Avg per punt	40.5	38.8
Time of possession/Game	28:56	31:04
3rd down conversions	62/186	74/206
4th down conversions	13/23	13/23
Touchdowns scored	40	32
Field goals-Attempts-Long	17–24–49	15–15–46
PAT-Attempts	35–36	28–28
Attendance	287303	264439
Games/Avg per Game	6/47884	5/52888

==== Scores by quarter ====
	1	2	3	4	Total
Purdue	75	112	64	77	328
Opponents	73	55	62	77	267

=== Offense ===
==== Rushing ====
Name	GP-GS	Att	Gain	Loss	Net	Avg	TD	Long	Avg/G
Markell Jones	10–3	113	580	14	566	5.0	1	32	56.6
D.J. Knox	13–5	90	567	6	561	6.2	2	41	43.2
Tario Fuller	3–3	43	269	8	261	6.1	2	39	87.0
Richie Worship	10–4	53	263	6	257	4.8	3	26	25.7
Jared Sparks	13–5	23	126	3	123	5.3	0	18	9.5
David Blough	9–5	42	186	83	103	2.5	2	21	11.4
B. Lankford-Johnson	6–0	22	91	5	86	3.9	0	15	14.3
Terry Wright	12–3	5	45	0	45	9.0	0	16	3.8
Gregory Phillips	13–6	2	26	0	26	13.0	0	21	2.0
Jackson Anthrop	13–11	10	23	6	17	1.7	2	5	1.3
Joe Schopper	13–0	1	13	0	13	13.0	0	13	1.0
Jarrett Burgess	6–3	1	0	0	0	0.0	0	0	0.0
Team	4–0	9	0	12	−12	−1.3	0	0	−3.0
Elijah Sindelar	12–8	33	69	145	−76	−2.3	0	21	−6.3
Total	13	447	2258	288	1970	4.4	12	41	151.5
Opponents	13	489	2065	337	1728	3.5	10	74	132.9

==== Passing ====
Name	GP-GS	Effic	Att-Cmp-Int	Pct	Yds	TD	Lng	Avg/G
Elijah Sindelar	12–8	124.2	187–329–7	56.8	2099	18	54	174.9
David Blough	9–5	137.8	102–157–4	65	1103	9	62	122.6
Team	4–0	0	0–2–0	0	0	0	0	0
Joe Schopper	13–0	284.8	2–2–0	100	44	0	22	3.4
Jackson Anthrop	13–11	301.6	1–1–0	100	24	0	24	1.8
Total	13	129.1	292–491–11	59.5	3270	27	62	251.5
Opponents	13	128.6	248–437–10	56.8	3153	21	52	242.5

==== Receiving ====
Name	GP-GS	No.	Yds	Avg	TD	Long	Avg/G
Jackson Anthrop	13–11	47	423	9	5	35	32.5
Gregory Phillips	13–6	44	424	9.6	2	42	32.6
Anthony Mahoungou	13–10	40	688	17.2	8	49	52.9
Terry Wright	12–3	29	274	9.4	0	36	22.8
Brycen Hopkins	12–0	25	349	14	3	38	29.1
Cole Herdman	12–8	20	331	16.5	3	62	27.6
Jared Sparks	13–5	19	222	11.7	0	34	17.1
D.J. Knox	13–5	15	138	9.2	2	22	10.6
Markell Jones	10–3	13	54	4.2	0	13	5.4
Jarrett Burgess	6–3	11	130	11.8	1	36	21.7
Richie Worship	10–4	10	73	7.3	2	17	7.3
Isaac Zico	11–3	6	34	5.7	1	10	3.1
Tario Fuller	3–3	5	37	7.4	0	25	12.3
B. Lankford-Johnson	6–0	3	11	3.7	0	6	1.8
David Blough	9–5	1	24	24	0	24	2.7
Mike Little	11–0	1	22	22	0	22	2
Ben Makowski	11–0	1	22	22	0	22	2
Darius Pittman	10–0	1	7	7	0	7	0.7
Corey Holmes	4–0	1	7	7	0	7	1.8
Total	13	292	3270	11.2	27	62	251.5
Opponents	13	248	3153	12.7	21	52	242.5

=== Defense ===
Name	GP	Tackles				Sacks	Pass defense		Interceptions				Fumbles		Blkd Kick
Name	GP	Solo	Ast	Total	TFL-Yds	No-Yds	BrUp	QBH	No.-Yds	Avg	TD	Long	Rcv-Yds	FF	Blkd Kick
Ja'Whaun Bentley	12	54	43	97	11.5- 28	1.0- 5	3		1- 76	76	1	76		2	
Markus Bailey	13	67	22	89	11.0- 63	7.0- 56	2		1- 22	22	0	22	1- 19	1	
Jacob Thieneman	13	52	28	80	5.0- 17	2.0- 13	2		2- 0	0	0	0	1- 0		
T.J. McCollum	10	43	26	69	6.0- 23	3.0- 17	2								
Navon Mosley	13	43	22	65	1.0- 4		3		2- 7	3.5	0	7	2- 0	1	
Josh Okonye	13	41	16	57	4.5- 21	1.0- 11	10								
Gelen Robinson	13	33	18	51	12.5- 42	4.0- 25	2						1- 0	1	
Danny Ezechukwu	13	36	14	50	9.0- 47	5.0- 38	1	1	1- 38	38	0	38	3- 32	1	
Da'Wan Hunte	12	34	9	43	1.0- 2		7		1- 42	42	0	42			
Garrett Hudson	13	20	11	31	2.5- 3				1- 21	21	0	21			2
Eddy Wilson	12	14	13	27	2.5- 10	1.0- 9	2	1							
Austin Larkin	13	12	11	23	1.0- 6									1	
Lorenzo Neal	13	18	4	22	5.5- 14	2.0- 10	1	1					1- 0	2	
Simeon Smiley	13	13	4	17			1								
Derrick Barnes	12	10	6	16	0.5- 1										
T.J. Jallow	9	11	5	16	1.0- 1		1								
Antoine Miles	12	6	9	15	5.5- 19	2.0- 15		1							
Kamal Hardy	8	11	2	13					1- 34	34	0	34			
Antonio Blackmon	11	9	2	11			2						1- 0		
Cornel Jones	8	4	1	5											
Mike Little	11	2	3	5											
Tim Cason	2	4		4			1							1	
Joe Schopper	13	4		4											
Wes Cook	10	1	2	3											
Team	4	1	2	3											
Keiwan Jones	3	1	2	3											
Jared Sparks	13	1	1	2											
Kai Higgins	11	2		2											
Anthony Watts	9	1		1											
Jackson Anthrop	13	1		1											
David Blough	9		1	1											
Ben Makowski	11	1		1											
Spencer Evans	13	1		1											
Tobias Larry	10	1		1											
Shane Evans	13	1		1											
Ray Ellis	1	1		1	1.0- 6	1.0- 6									
Race Johnson	8	1		1											
Anthony Mahoungou	13	1		1											
Brennan Thieneman	11		1	1											
Malcolm Dotson	9												1- 0		
Total	13	556	278	834	81- 307	29- 205	40	4	10- 240	24	1	76	11- 51	10	2
Opponents	13	556	282	838	66- 298	33- 216	72	4	11- 85	7.7	1	61	6- 4	9	1

=== Special teams ===
Name	Punting								Kickoffs				
Name	No.	Yds	Avg	Long	TB	FC	I20	Blkd	No.	Yds	Avg	TB	OB
Joe Schopper	73	2953	40.5	68	4	41	30	0					
Spencer Evans									60	3681	61.3	35	1
Myles Homan									6	378	63.0	3	0
Total	73	2953	40.5	68	4	41	30	0	66	4059	61.5	38	1
Opponents	87	3372	38.8	65	5	40	27	2	56	3444	61.5	25	1

Name	Punt returns					Kick returns				
Name	No.	Yds	Avg	TD	Long	No.	Yds	Avg	TD	Long
Jackson Anthrop	17	30	1.8	0	7	2	47	23.5	0	27
Garrett Hudson	1	14	14.0	0	0	1	4	4	0	4
Race Johnson	0	18	0.0	0	18					
D.J. Knox						16	288	18	0	44
KeyRon Catlett						5	62	12.4	0	21
Richie Worship						3	63	21	0	22
Markell Jones						2	29	14.5	0	18
Darius Pittman						1	16	16	0	16
Total	18	62	3.4	0	18	30	509	17	0	44
Opponents	13	89	6.8	0	39	26	609	23.4	0	53

All statistics

== Awards and honors ==
=== Preseason awards / Watch list ===
Awards
Player	Award	Date awarded	Ref.
David Blough	Wuerffel Trophy Watch List	July 18, 2017	
David Blough	Johnny Unitas Golden Arm Award Watch List	July 19, 2017	

== Players in the 2018 NFL draft ==
Player	Position	Round	Pick	NFL club
Ja'Whaun Bentley	LB	5	143	New England Patriots
