= San Francisco Bowl =

21st century American college football game

San Francisco Bowl (defunct)
- Previous stadiums: Pacific Bell Park (2002–2013); Levi's Stadium (2014–2019)
- Previous locations: San Francisco, California (2002–2013); Santa Clara, California (2014–2019)
- Operated: 2002–2019
- Conference tie-ins: Pac-12 (2006–2019); Big Ten (2014–2019)
- Previous conference tie-ins: Big East (2002–2004); Mtn West (2002–2005); ACC (2005–2010); Army (2011); Navy (2012); BYU (2013)
- Payout: US$3.6 million (2019)

Sponsors
- Diamond Foods (2002–2009); Kraft Foods (2010–2012); Foster Farms (2014–2017); Redbox (2018–2019)

Former names
- San Francisco Bowl (2002); Diamond Walnut San Francisco Bowl (2002–2003); Emerald Bowl (2004–2009); Kraft Fight Hunger Bowl (2010–2012); Fight Hunger Bowl (2013); Foster Farms Bowl (2014–2017); Redbox Bowl (2018–2019)

2020 matchup
- Canceled due to COVID-19 concerns

2021 matchup
- Canceled due to lack of network and sponsor

The San Francisco Bowl was an annual postseason college football bowl game certified by the NCAA and played in the San Francisco Bay Area. Originally named the Diamond Walnut San Francisco Bowl during its first two editions from 2002 to 2003, it was the Emerald Bowl from 2004 to 2009, the Kraft Fight Hunger Bowl from 2010 to 2013, the Foster Farms Bowl from 2014 to 2017, and the Redbox Bowl from 2018 to 2020. San Francisco Bowl naming returned during planning for a 2021 game.

The game had four sellouts—2006 (UCLA vs. Florida State), 2008 (Cal vs. Miami), 2009 (USC vs. Boston College), and 2011 (Nevada vs. Boston College)—and three of the highest rated bowls ever televised on ESPN. It also gained a national reputation for the quality of hospitality provided to the participating teams.

The game was most recently played in December 2019. From 2002 to 2013, it was played at Pacific Bell Park, home of the San Francisco Giants, in San Francisco, California. From 2014 through 2019, it was played at Levi's Stadium, home of the San Francisco 49ers, in Santa Clara, California.

At the end of July 2020, organizers canceled the 2020 edition of the bowl due to the COVID-19 pandemic; at the same time, the 49ers released a statement noting that "the decision has been made to not renew the current agreement to host the game moving forward". On September 10, 2021, the game was again canceled for the 2021–22 bowl season, putting its future in jeopardy. The bowl was later quietly cancelled without any notice due to continuing sponsor and network concerns.

== History ==
The game was founded by John Marks, president of the San Francisco Convention & Visitors Bureau, San Francisco Giants executive Pat Gallagher and sports industry veteran Gary Cavalli, former Associate Athletic Director at Stanford University and president of the pioneering American Basketball League, for the purpose of utilizing the Giants' new ballpark, bringing visitors to San Francisco during a traditionally slow time of the year, and rewarding two successful teams with a week in San Francisco.

Plans for the inaugural 2002 San Francisco Bowl were established on Dec. 2, 2002, when the Air Force Falcons football program accepted a bid to play against an undetermined team from the Big East Conference. Their initial sponsor was Diamond Foods, a producer of walnuts and other nuts under the Emerald brand name, resulting in the name Diamond Walnut San Francisco Bowl, and later the Emerald Bowl.

In 2010, Kraft Foods became the sponsor of the bowl and announced the new name, which the corporation launched as part of a broader hunger relief program. Mondelēz International continued to support the game and the program related with Feeding America in 2013.

In August 2014, the bowl's official website listed the game's name as the San Francisco Bowl once again. However, on November 11, 2014, it was announced that the San Francisco Bowl Game Association had reached a multi-year naming rights deal with Northern California-based poultry company Foster Farms, resulting in the game being named the Foster Farms Bowl.

On July 12, 2016, the San Francisco 49ers NFL team announced that it had taken over management of the Foster Farms Bowl from the San Francisco Bowl Game Association, and also announced a new, four-year broadcast rights deal with Fox Sports, replacing ESPN.

In September 2018, Redbox (a chain of video rental kiosks) announced it had become the new title sponsor.

== Conference tie-ins ==
The game had a contract to host the Pac-12's sixth-place team during the 2010 through 2013 seasons. There were multiple contracts that determined the opponent. In 2011, the Pac-12 team's opponent was Illinois, replacing Army, which did not achieve bowl eligibility; in 2012, it was Navy; and in 2013, it was BYU. Had these teams not qualified for bowl eligibility, they would have been replaced by teams from the Atlantic Coast Conference (ACC) or the Mid-American Conference (MAC).

Beginning with the 2014 season, teams come from the Pac-12 and Big Ten conferences. With Oregon's appearance in the 2018 edition, Colorado and Washington State are the only Pac-12 members who have not appeared in the game.

== Field configuration ==
Because Pacific Bell Park (as it was named when it first hosted the bowl) is a baseball park and not normally used for football, arrangement of the field required both teams to be on the same sideline (southeast), separated by a barrier at the 50-yard line (in shallow right-center field). The opposite sideline (northwest) ran along the third base line, with an end zone near the first base dugout, and the other near the left field wall. Primary seating was in the third base grandstand, with temporary bleacher seating in right-center field.

== Results ==
Rankings are based on the AP Poll prior to the game being played.

Date	Bowl name	Winning team		Losing team		Attnd.
December 31, 2002	San Francisco Bowl	No. 21 Virginia Tech	20	Air Force	13	25,966
December 31, 2003	San Francisco Bowl	Boston College	35	Colorado State	21	25,621
December 30, 2004	Emerald Bowl	Navy	34	New Mexico	19	30,563
December 29, 2005	Emerald Bowl	Utah	38	No. 24 Georgia Tech	10	25,742
December 27, 2006	Emerald Bowl	Florida State	44	UCLA	27	40,331
December 28, 2007	Emerald Bowl	Oregon State	21	Maryland	14	32,517
December 27, 2008	Emerald Bowl	California	24	Miami (FL)	17	42,268
December 26, 2009	Emerald Bowl	USC	24	Boston College	13	40,121
January 9, 2011	Fight Hunger Bowl	No. 13 Nevada	20	Boston College	13	41,063
December 31, 2011	Fight Hunger Bowl	Illinois	20	UCLA	14	29,878
December 29, 2012	Fight Hunger Bowl	Arizona State	62	Navy	28	34,172
December 27, 2013	Fight Hunger Bowl	Washington	31	BYU	16	34,136
December 30, 2014	Foster Farms Bowl	Stanford	45	Maryland	21	34,780
December 26, 2015	Foster Farms Bowl	Nebraska	37	UCLA	29	33,527
December 28, 2016	Foster Farms Bowl	Utah	26	Indiana	24	27,608
December 27, 2017	Foster Farms Bowl	Purdue	38	Arizona	35	28,436
December 31, 2018	Redbox Bowl	Oregon	7	Michigan State	6	30,212
December 30, 2019	Redbox Bowl	California	35	Illinois	20	34,177
2020	Redbox Bowl	Canceled due to the COVID-19 pandemic.				
2021	San Francisco Bowl	Canceled due to no TV deal or corporate sponsor.				

== MVPs ==
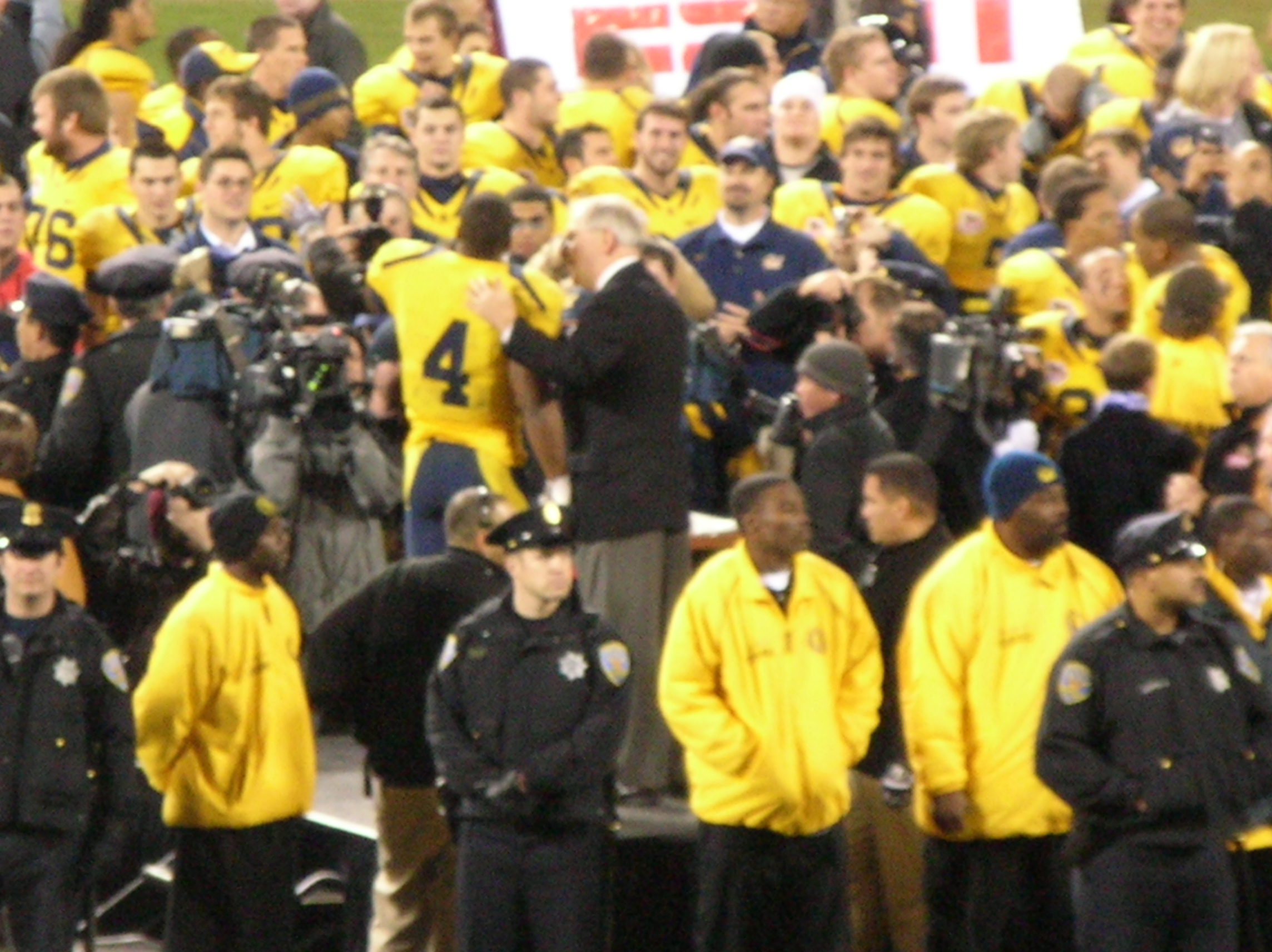
Cal running back Jahvid Best (no. 4) accepts the 2008 Emerald Bowl Offensive MVP trophy from Emerald Bowl Executive Director Gary Cavalli

Game	Offensive MVP			Defensive MVP		
Game	Player	Team	Pos.	Player	Team	Pos.
2002	Bryan Randall	Virginia Tech	QB	Anthony Schlegel	Air Force	LB
2003	Derrick Knight	Boston College	RB	T. J. Stancil	Boston College	FS
2004	Aaron Polanco	Navy	QB	Vaughn Keley	Navy	CB
2005	Travis LaTendresse	Utah	WR	Eric Weddle	Utah	CB
2006	Lorenzo Booker	Florida State	RB	Tony Carter	Florida State	CB
2007	Yvenson Bernard	Oregon State	RB	Derrick Doggett	Oregon State	LB
2008	Jahvid Best	California	RB	Zack Follett	California	LB
2009	Damian Williams	USC	WR	Luke Kuechly	Boston College	LB
Jan. 2011	Rishard Matthews	Nevada	WR	Luke Kuechly	Boston College	LB
Dec. 2011	Nathan Scheelhaase	Illinois	QB	Terry Hawthorne	Illinois	DB
2012	Marion Grice	Arizona State	RB	Will Sutton	Arizona State	DT
2013	Bishop Sankey	Washington	RB	Hau'oli Kikaha	Washington	DE
2014	Kevin Hogan	Stanford	QB	James Vaughters	Stanford	LB
2015	Tommy Armstrong Jr.	Nebraska	QB	Jaleel Wadood	UCLA	S
2016	Joe Williams	Utah	RB	Tegray Scales	Indiana	LB
2017	Elijah Sindelar	Purdue	QB	Ja'Whaun Bentley	Purdue	LB
2018	Dillon Mitchell	Oregon	WR	Josiah Scott	Michigan State	CB
2019	Chase Garbers	California	QB	Zeandae Johnson	California	DE

== Most appearances ==
Updated through the December 2019 edition (18 games, 36 total appearances).

Teams with multiple appearances

Rank	Team	Appearances	Record	Win pct.
T1	Boston College	3	1–2	.333
T1	UCLA	3	0–3	.000
T3	California	2	2–0	1.000
T3	Utah	2	2–0	1.000
T3	Illinois	2	1–1	.500
T3	Navy	2	1–1	.500
T3	Maryland	2	0–2	.000

Teams with a single appearance

Won (11): Arizona State, Florida State, Nebraska, Nevada, Oregon, Oregon State, Purdue, Stanford, USC, Virginia Tech, Washington
Lost (9): Air Force, Arizona, BYU, Colorado State, Georgia Tech, Indiana, Miami (FL), Michigan State, New Mexico

Of the members of the Pac-12 at the discontinuation of the bowl, only Washington State and Colorado never appeared in the game.

== Appearances by conference ==
Updated through the December 2019 edition (18 games, 36 total appearances).

Conference	Record				Appearances by season	
Conference	Games	W	L	Win pct.	Won	Lost
Pac-12	13	9	4	.692	2007, 2008, 2009, 2012, 2013, 2014, 2016, 2018, 2019	2006, 2011, 2015, 2017
Big Ten	7	3	4	.429	2011, 2015, 2017	2014, 2016, 2018, 2019
ACC	6	1	5	.167	2006	2005, 2007, 2008, 2009, 2010*
Mountain West	4	1	3	.250	2005	2002, 2003, 2004
Independents	3	1	2	.333	2004	2012, 2013
Big East	2	2	0	1.000	2002, 2003	
WAC	1	1	0	1.000	2010*	

- Games marked with an asterisk (*) were played in January of the following calendar year.
- The Pac-12's record includes appearances when the conference was the Pac-10 (3–1).
- Virginia Tech (2002) and Boston College (2003) appeared as members of the Big East; the American Athletic Conference (The American) retains the Big East's conference charter following the 2013 split of the original Big East along football lines.
- Independent appearances: Navy (2004, 2012) and BYU (2013).
- The WAC no longer sponsors FBS-level football.

== Game records ==
Team	Record, Team vs. Opponent	Year
Most points scored	62, Arizona State vs Navy	2012
Most points scored (losing team)	35, Arizona vs Purdue	2017
Most points scored (both teams)	90, Arizona State vs Navy	2012
Fewest points allowed	6, Oregon vs. Michigan State	2018
Largest margin of victory	34, Arizona State vs Navy	2012
Total yards	648, Arizona State vs. Navy	2012
Rushing yards	380, Arizona State vs. Navy	2012
Passing yards	396, Purdue vs. Arizona	2017
First downs	36, Arizona State vs. Navy	2012
Fewest yards allowed	185, Nevada vs. Boston College	2011
Fewest rushing yards allowed	17, Stanford vs. Maryland	2014
Fewest passing yards allowed	37, Arizona State vs. Navy	2012
Individual	Record, Player, Team vs. Opponent	Year
All-purpose yards		
Touchdowns (overall)	4, Travis LaTendresse, Utah vs. Georgia Tech	2005
Rushing yards	222, Joe Williams, Utah vs. Indiana	2016
Rushing touchdowns	3, most recently: Remound Wright, Stanford vs. Maryland	2014
Passing yards	396, Elijah Sindelar, Purdue vs. Arizona	2017
Passing touchdowns	4, most recently: Chase Garbers, California vs. Illinois	2019
Receiving yards	214, Travis LaTendresse, Utah vs. Georgia Tech	2005
Receiving touchdowns	4, Travis LaTendresse, Utah vs. Georgia Tech	2005
Tackles		
Sacks		
Interceptions		
Long Plays	Record, Player, Team vs. Opponent	Year
Touchdown run	46, Chris Swain, Navy vs. Arizona State	2012
Touchdown pass	78, Brandon Breazell from Patrick Cowan, UCLA vs, Florida State	2006
Kickoff return	100, shared by: John Ross, Washington vs. BYU; William Likely, Maryland vs. Stanford	2013; 2014
Punt return	72, Rishard Matthews, Nevada vs. Boston College	Jan. 2011
Interception return	86, Tony Carter, Florida State vs. UCLA	2006
Fumble return		
Punt		
Field goal	48, Andy Phillips, Utah vs. Indiana	2016

== Media coverage ==
From 2002 through 2015, the bowl was televised by ESPN or ESPN2; from 2016 to 2019, it was carried by Fox.
