= 2017 Foster Farms Bowl =

- 16th Foster Farms Bowl
Arizona Wildcats	Purdue Boilermakers
(7–5)	(6–6)
Pac-12	Big Ten
35	38
Head coach: Rich Rodriguez	Head coach: Jeff Brohm
	1	2	3	4	Total
Arizona	14	0	14	7	35
Purdue	14	17	0	7	38
- Date: December 27, 2017
- Season: 2017
- Stadium: Levi's Stadium
- Location: Santa Clara, California
- MVP: Elijah Sindelar (QB, Purdue) & Ja'Whaun Bentley (LB, Purdue)
- Favorite: Arizona by 3.5
- National anthem: Pitman High School Madrigals
- Referee: Brad Van Vark (Big XII)
- Attendance: 28,436
- Payout: US$3,600,000

United States TV coverage
- Network: Fox
- Announcers: Joe Davis, Brady Quinn, Bruce Feldman

The 2017 Foster Farms Bowl was an American college football bowl game played on December 27, 2017, at Levi's Stadium in Santa Clara, California. It was one of the 2017–18 bowl games concluding the 2017 FBS football season. The 16th edition of the Foster Farms Bowl, the game featured the Arizona Wildcats from the Pac-12 Conference against the Purdue Boilermakers from the Big Ten Conference. It was sponsored by the Foster Farms poultry company.

== Team selection ==
The game features conference tie-ins with teams from the Pac-12 Conference and the Big Ten Conference.

=== Arizona ===
The Wildcats finished their regular season 7–5 and accepted an invitation to play in the Foster Farms Bowl. This was Arizona's first trip to the Foster Farms Bowl; they entered the game with a record of 9–10–1 in prior bowl appearances. Their last bowl win was at the 2015 New Mexico Bowl, when they defeated New Mexico 45–37.

=== Purdue ===
After finishing their season 6–6, the Boilermakers received an invitation to play in the Foster Farms Bowl, which they accepted. This bowl marked the Boilermakers' eighteenth bowl appearance (they were 9–8 in prior bowl games) and they were seeking their first bowl victory since the 2011 Little Caesars Pizza Bowl, when they beat Western Michigan 37–32.

== Game summary ==
=== Scoring summary ===
Scoring summary

Quarter	Time	Drive			Team	Scoring information	Score	
Quarter	Time	Plays	Yards	TOP	Team	Scoring information	ARIZ	PUR
1	11:43	6	60	1:24	PUR	Anthony Mahoungou 31-yard touchdown reception from Elijah Sindelar, Spencer Evans kick good	0	7
1	6:43	4	68	1:00	ARIZ	Shawn Poindexter 31-yard touchdown reception from Khalil Tate, Josh Pollack kick good	7	7
1	4:09	3	34	1:06	ARIZ	Tony Ellison 29-yard touchdown reception from Khalil Tate, Josh Pollack kick good	14	7
1	2:22	5	75	1:47	PUR	Gregory Phillips 42-yard touchdown reception from Elijah Sindelar, J.D. Dellinger kick good	14	14
2	9:12	13	90	5:04	PUR	Gregory Phillips 22-yard touchdown reception from Elijah Sindelar, Spencer Evans kick good	14	21
2	4:11	6	80	2:06	PUR	D.J. Knox 13-yard touchdown run, J.D. Dellinger kick good	14	28
2	0:00	11	92	1:35	PUR	26-yard field goal by Spencer Evans	14	31
3	8:53	7	72	3:21	ARIZ	Tony Ellison 40-yard touchdown reception from Khalil Tate, Joshua Pollack kick good	21	31
3	6:31	4	51	1:27	ARIZ	Tyrell Johnson 40-yard touchdown reception from Khalil Tate, Joshua Pollack kick good	28	31
4	3:21	7	67	2:26	ARIZ	Shun Brown 24-yard touchdown reception from Khalil Tate, Josh Pollack kick good	35	31
4	1:44	8	75	1:37	PUR	Anthony Mahoungou 38-yard touchdown reception from Elijah Sindelar, J.D. Dellinger kick good	35	38
"TOP" = time of possession. For other American football terms, see Glossary of American football.							35	38

=== Statistics ===
	1	2	3	4	Total
Wildcats	14	0	14	7	35
Boilermakers	14	17	0	7	38

Statistics	ARIZ	PUR
First downs	19	27
Plays–yards	69–430	90–556
Rushes–yards	43–128	39–160
Passing yards	302	396
Passing: Comp–Att–Int	17–26–1	33–53–1
Time of possession	28:51	30:39

Team	Category	Player	Statistics
ARIZ	Passing	Khalil Tate	17/26, 302 yds, 5 TD, 1 INT
ARIZ	Rushing	Khalil Tate	20 car, 58 yds
ARIZ	Receiving	Tony Ellison	4 rec, 102 yds, 2 TD
PUR	Passing	Elijah Sindelar	33/53, 396 yds, 4 TD, 1 INT
PUR	Rushing	D.J. Knox	11 car, 101 yds, 1 TD
PUR	Receiving	Gregory Phillips	14 rec, 149 yds, 2 TD
