= Kevin Wolthausen =

American football player and coach (born 1957)

Current position
- Team: Dallas Renegades

Biographical details
- Born: December 27, 1957 (age 68); Santa Barbara, California, U.S.

Playing career
- 1978–1979: Humboldt State
- Position: Linebacker

Coaching career (HC unless noted)
- 1980: Cal State Northridge (SA)
- 1981–1982: Humboldt State (assistant)
- 1983–1984: Arizona (GA)
- 1985: Arizona (OLB)
- 1986: Arizona (DL)
- 1987–1992: USC (DL)
- 1993–1994: Oklahoma (DL)
- 1995–2000: Arizona State (DL)
- 2002: Arizona Rattlers (FB/LB)
- 2002: Eastern Michigan (OLB)
- 2003: Louisville (LB)
- 2004–2005: Louisville (DL)
- 2006: Louisville (co-DC/DL)
- 2007: Atlanta Falcons (DL)
- 2009–2011: Las Vegas Locomotives (DL)
- 2012: Purdue (DL)
- 2013: FIU (ST)
- 2014–2015: UConn (DL/RC)
- 2016: UConn (ST/LB)
- 2017: Purdue (QC)
- 2018: Purdue (DL)
- 2019: Purdue (STC/DL)
- 2020–2023: San Diego State (DA)
- 2024: East Tennessee State (co-DC/LB)
- 2026–present: Dallas Renegades (LB)

Accomplishments and honors

Championships
- 2 UFL (2009, 2010)

Kevin Wolthausen (born December 27, 1957) is an American football coach and former linebacker.

== Coaching career ==
Wolthausen was hired as the defensive line coach for the Purdue Boilermakers football team on February 8, 2012. Wolthausen was relieved of his duties the following season, when head coach Danny Hope was fired.

Wolthausen was named the FIU Panthers Special teams coach on February 4, 2013.

On January 7, 2014, Wolthausen was named the defensive line coach and recruiting coordinator for the Connecticut Huskies football team under new head coach Bob Diaco. Wolthausen was shifted to linebackers and special teams coach in 2016.

On June 2, 2017, Wolthausen returned to Purdue as a quality control coach for new head coach Jeff Brohm.

In 2024, Wolthausen was named co-defensive coordinator and linebackers coach for East Tennessee State.
