= Anthony Mahoungou =

French gridiron football player (born 1994)

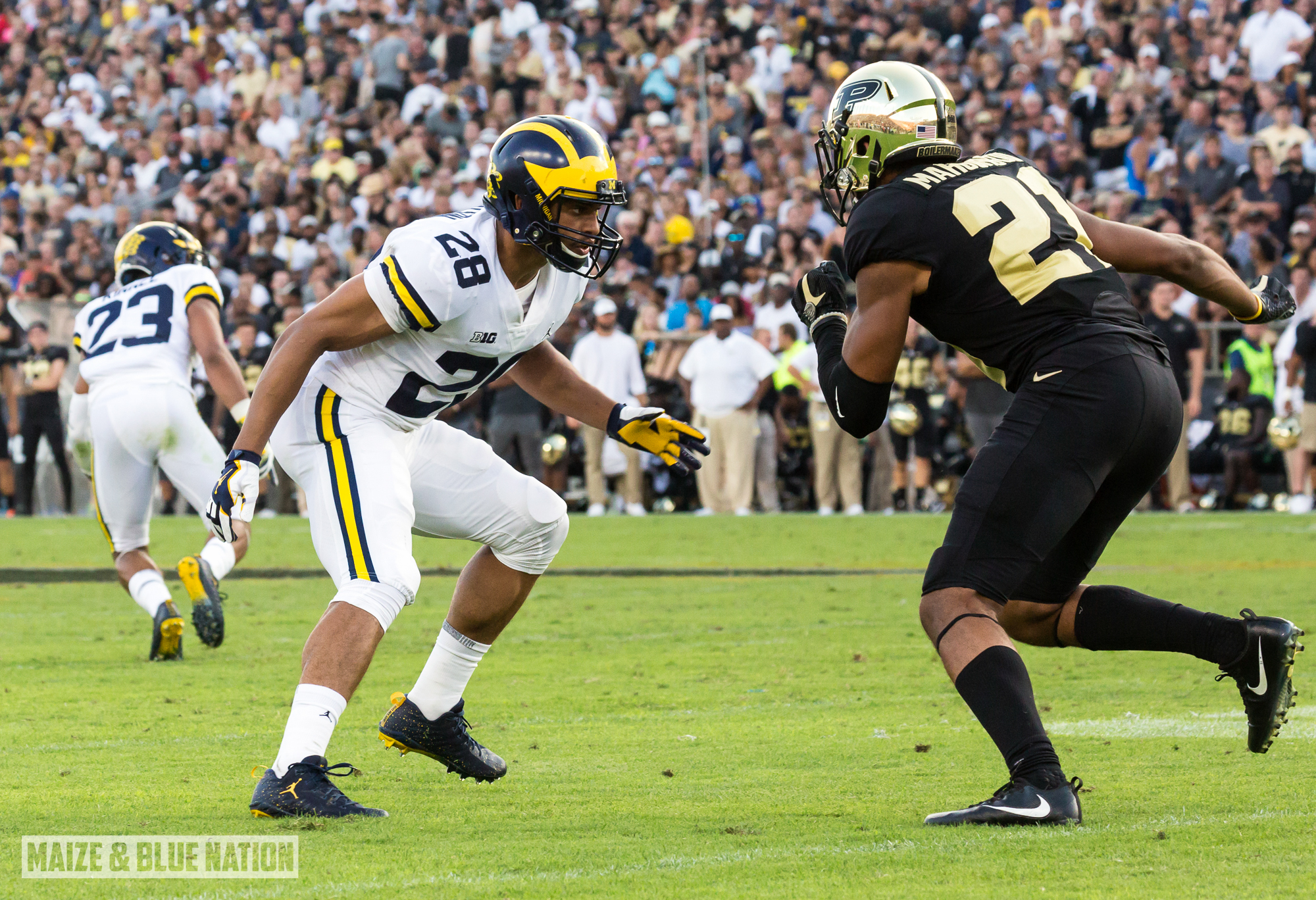
- Mahoungou coming off the line of scrimmage

No. 1 – Paris Musketeers
- Position: Wide receiver
- Roster status: Active
- CFL status: Global

Personal information
- Born: 12 February 1994 (age 32); Paris, France
- Listed height: 6 ft 3 in (1.91 m)
- Listed weight: 210 lb (95 kg)

Career information
- College: Coalinga (2014); Purdue (2015-2017)
- CFL draft: 2021G: 1st round, 9th overall pick

Career history
- 2018: Philadelphia Eagles*
- 2019–2020: Frankfurt Universe
- 2021: Frankfurt Galaxy
- 2021–2022: Ottawa Redblacks
- 2023: Rhein Fire
- 2024–present: Paris Musketeers
- * Offseason or practice squad member only

Awards and highlights
- Foster Farms Bowl champion (2017); 2× European League of Football champion (2021, 2023)
- Stats at CFL.ca

Anthony Jean Herve Mahoungou (born 12 February 1994) is a French professional gridiron football wide receiver for the Paris Musketeers of the European League of Football (ELF). He most recently played for the Rhein Fire of the European League of Football (ELF). He has also played for the Philadelphia Eagles of the National Football League (NFL), the Frankfurt Universe of the German Football League (GFL), the Frankfurt Galaxy of the ELF, and the Ottawa Redblacks of the Canadian Football League (CFL).

He played college football for the Purdue Boilermakers and has been a member of the France national team.

== Honours ==
- Foster Farms Bowl: 2017
- ELF Champion: 2021
