= Elijah Sindelar =

American football player (born 1996)

No. 2
- Position: Quarterback

Personal information
- Born: June 27, 1996 (age 30)
- Listed height: 6 ft 5 in (1.96 m)
- Listed weight: 230 lb (104 kg)

Career information
- High school: Caldwell County (Princeton, Kentucky)
- College: Purdue (2015–2019)
- Stats at ESPN

Elijah S. Sindelar (born June 27, 1996) is an American former college football player who was a quarterback for the Purdue Boilermakers.

== Early life ==
Sindelar attended Caldwell County High School in Princeton, Kentucky. Sindelar started at quarterback for all four years of his high school career, throwing for 5,654 yards and 51 touchdowns in his first two seasons. As a junior, Sindelar threw for 3,374 yards and 44 touchdowns. As a senior, he threw for 3,609 yards and 49 touchdowns, being named the Gatorade Kentucky Football Player of the Year and Kentucky Mr. Football. Sindelar committed to play college football at Purdue University over offers from Kentucky and Ole Miss.

== College career ==
In his first year on campus in 2015, Sindelar redshirted. The following season, he played exclusively as a reserve, before being named the starting quarterback for Purdue's 2017 season opener against Louisville, following an injury to David Blough. In the 2017 Foster Farms Bowl, Sindelar completed 33 passes for 396 yards and four touchdowns, being named the game's offensive MVP. After the game, it was revealed that he had played the final 3 1/2 games of the season with a torn ACL, requiring him to undergo surgery. Entering the 2018 season, he competed with Blough for the starting quarterback role, with Sindelar being named the starter. In the season opener against Northwestern, he threw three interceptions before being benched for Blough. Sindelar went on to take a medical redshirt due to knee tendinitis and an upper-body injury. He returned as the starter in 2019. Against Vanderbilt, he threw for a career-high 509 yards in addition to totaling six touchdowns, before suffering a concussion. Against Minnesota, his final career start, he left with an injury after being sacked. Sindelar received a sixth year of eligibility from the NCAA; however, he opted not to return and retire from football.

=== Statistics ===
Year	Team	Games			Passing								Rushing			
Year	Team	GP	GS	Record	Cmp	Att	Pct	Yds	Avg	TD	Int	Rtg	Att	Yds	Avg	TD
2015	Purdue	DNP														
2016	Purdue	5	0	0−0	14	32	43.8	165	5.2	0	3	68.3	4	9	2.3	0
2017	Purdue	12	8	4−4	187	329	56.8	2,099	6.4	18	7	124.2	33	-76	-2.3	0
2018	Purdue	2	1	0−1	26	44	59.1	283	6.4	2	3	114.5	4	-1	-0.3	0
2019	Purdue	3	3	1−2	72	112	64.3	978	8.7	9	3	158.8	12	29	2.4	1
Career		24	12	5−7	299	517	57.8	3,525	7.5	29	16	127.4	53	-39	-0.7	1
