= Jeff Brohm =

American football player and coach (born 1971)

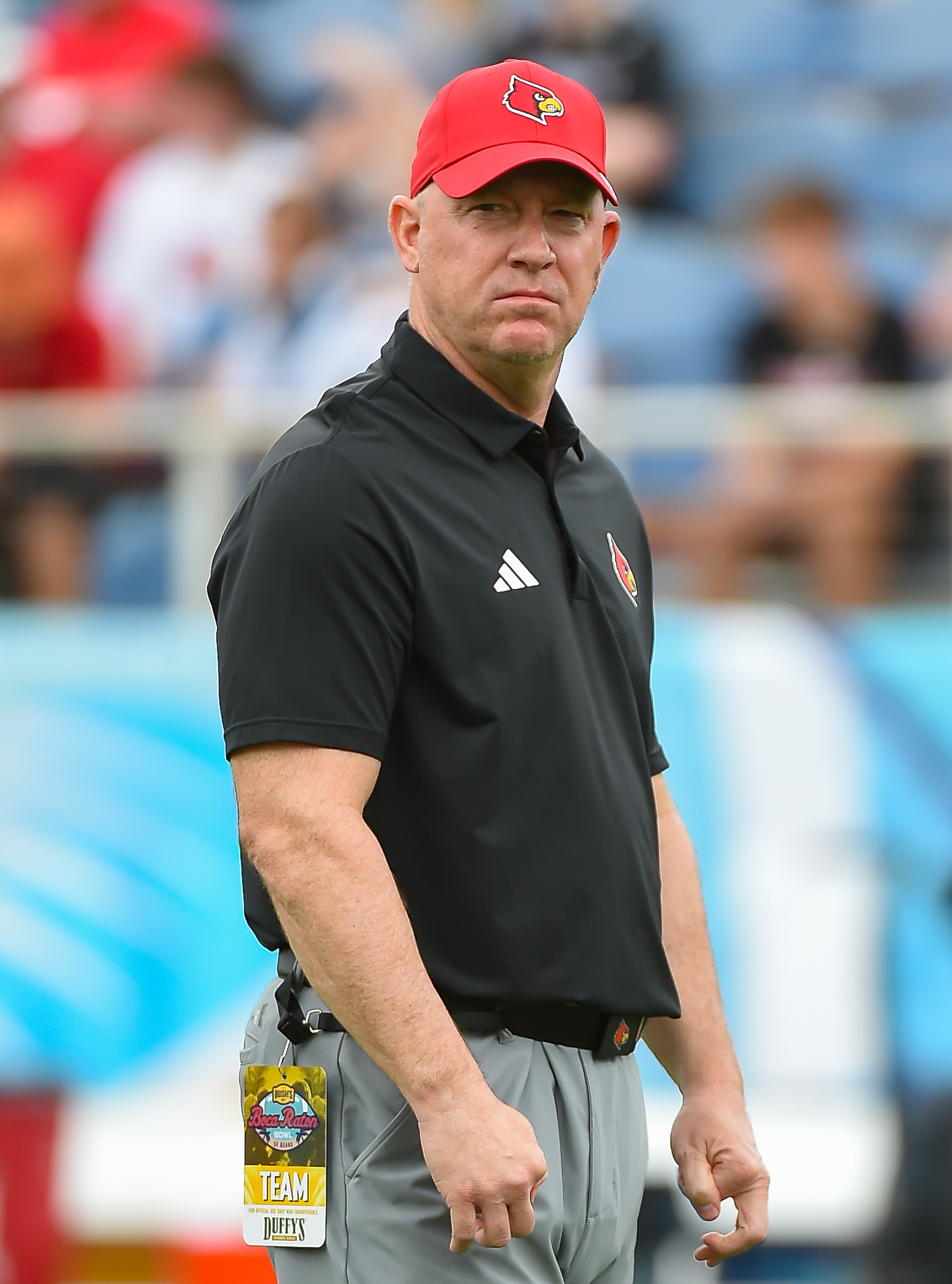
- Brohm in 2025

Louisville Cardinals
- Title: Head coach

Personal information
- Born: April 24, 1971 (age 55); Louisville, Kentucky, U.S.
- Listed height: 6 ft 1 in (1.85 m)
- Listed weight: 205 lb (93 kg)

Career information
- Position: Quarterback (No. 11)
- High school: Trinity (Louisville, Kentucky)
- College: Louisville (1989–1993)
- NFL draft: 1994: undrafted

Career history

Playing
- San Diego Chargers (1994); Washington Redskins (1995); San Francisco 49ers (1995–1997); Tampa Bay Buccaneers (1998); Denver Broncos (1999); Cleveland Browns (2000); Orlando Rage (2001)

Coaching
- Louisville Fire (2002) Head coach; Louisville (2003–2008); Quarterbacks coach (2003–2006); Assistant head coach & passing game coordinator (2007); Assistant head coach & offensive coordinator (2008); Florida Atlantic (2009) Quarterbacks coach; Illinois (2010–2011) Quarterbacks coach; UAB (2012) Offensive coordinator & quarterbacks coach; Western Kentucky (2013–2016); Assistant head coach, offensive coordinator & quarterbacks coach (2013); Head coach (2014–2016); Purdue (2017–2022) Head coach; Louisville (2023–present) Head coach

Awards and highlights
- Playing: Liberty Bowl MVP (1993); Louisville Cardinals Ring of Honor; 2001 All-XFL Team; Coaching: 2× C-USA champion (2015, 2016); 2× C-USA East Division champion (2015, 2016); Big Ten West Division champion (2022)

Career NFL statistics
- TD–INT: 1–1
- Passing yards: 353
- Passer rating: 79.2
- Stats at Pro Football Reference

Head coaching record
- Career: 102–59 (college); 2–14 (AF2)

Jeffrey Scott Brohm (born April 24, 1971) is an American college football coach and former professional quarterback. He is the head football coach at his alma mater, the University of Louisville, a position he has held since the 2023 season. Brohm played college football for the Louisville Cardinals under coach Howard Schnellenberger from 1989 to 1993. He played professionally in the National Football League (NFL) for seven seasons from 1994 to 2000 and the XFL in 2001. Brohm served as the head football coach at Western Kentucky University from 2014 to 2016 and Purdue University from 2017 to 2022.

Brohm was born in Louisville, Kentucky. His father, Oscar, was a quarterback for Louisville and a high school football coach in Louisville. He attended Trinity High School in Louisville, Kentucky. After graduation from high school, he was selected by the Montreal Expos in the seventh round of the 1989 MLB draft, but he instead decided to pursue playing football and baseball at the University of Louisville. After spending his freshman season as a backup quarterback, he was once again selected in the MLB Draft, this time in the fourth round by the Cleveland Indians. This time Brohm had a change of heart and decided to pursue a professional baseball career in the summers when he wasn't playing football. After two summers, he decided to drop baseball and focus solely on football. As starting quarterback for two seasons, he led the Cardinals to the 1993 Liberty Bowl.

Brohm went undrafted in the 1994 NFL draft. He played seven years as a quarterback in the NFL, with the San Diego Chargers in 1994, the Washington Redskins in 1995, the San Francisco 49ers from 1995 to 1997, the Tampa Bay Buccaneers in 1998, the Denver Broncos in 1999 and the Cleveland Browns in 2000. He also played one season with the Orlando Rage of the XFL, where he was named to the All-XFL team despite having his season end early with a shoulder injury.

In 2002, Brohm moved to the AF2 where he became the head coach of the Louisville Fire. Brohm returned to the University of Louisville in 2003 to work under Bobby Petrino. He spent the next six years as a quarterback coach, passing game coordinator, offensive coordinator, and assistant head coach for the Cardinals and helped them win the 2007 Orange Bowl. In 2009, Brohm went to Florida Atlantic University, where he was reunited with Schnellenberger as offensive coordinator. Brohm then went on to coach at the University of Illinois at Urbana-Champaign from 2010 to 2011, at the University of Alabama at Birmingham in 2012, and reuniting with Petrino at Western Kentucky University in 2013 as an associate head coach, offensive coordinator and quarterbacks coach. When Petrino returned to Louisville in 2014, Brohm was promoted to head coach of the Western Kentucky Hilltoppers. As head coach, he led the team to three bowl games, winning two of them. In 2016, Brohm took the head coaching position at Purdue University. Brohm returned to Louisville as head coach in December 2022.

== Early life ==
Brohm was born in Louisville, Kentucky, in 1971. He is the son of Donna and Oscar Brohm. Brohm and his siblings Greg, Kimberly, and Brian were born in Louisville while his father was an assistant football coach at Trinity High School in Louisville.

Brohm was a standout high school player at Trinity High School in Louisville. He was named the "Kentucky High School Player of the Decade" for the 1980s and won the Kentucky "Mr. Football" Award in 1988 while leading his team to a state championship and undefeated season. Brohm was inducted as a member of the 2014 Kentucky High School Athletic Association Hall of Fame class.

== College playing career ==
=== 1989 and 1990 seasons ===
In February 1989, Brohm committed to play football for Howard Schnellenberger's Louisville Cardinals football team. Brohm played in every game, but was relegated to backing up Browning Nagle. The 1990 Cardinals ended the season 10–1–1 in the 1991 Fiesta Bowl. Brohm played for two series during the Fiesta Bowl, but on his first series he was intercepted. He was intercepted again on his second series by Charles Garner who returned it 49-yards for a touchdown.

=== 1991 season ===
After Nagle graduated, Brohm became the starting quarterback for the 1991 team. Just two games into the season, Brohm and the Cardinals were facing the Tennessee Volunteers, when Brohm suffered a fracture in his right ankle, placing him in a cast for six weeks.

=== 1992 season ===
Brohm returned from his ankle injury to regain his starting quarterback role. In his first game back, Brohm was a two-point conversion away from knocking off #17 Ohio State as Brohm's pressured pass floated just past the arms of Ralph Dawkins. Brohm played well against #6 Florida, completing 66.6% of his passes and frustrating the Gators defense with his ability to scramble. The Cardinals ended up losing 31–17.

=== 1993 season ===
Brohm returned for his senior season. After taking every snap as a junior, Brohm proved he was fully recovered from his ankle injury. After defeating San Jose State to begin the season, Brohm had a dominant performance against Memphis State, throwing for four touchdowns and 219 yards—175 yards and three touchdowns of which went to Aaron Bailey. The following week, Brohm threw for a career-high 331 yards defeating the #23 Arizona State 35–17. Brohm led the Cardinals to the #17 ranking. During the game against #24 West Virginia, Brohm threw for 270 yards. However, he had two very critical turnovers, including an interception with 3:02 to play. The Cardinals were upset by the Mountaineers 36–34. After a 7–1 start, the Cardinals accepted a bid to be the home team in the 1993 Liberty Bowl Brohm broke the index finger of his passing hand in Louisville's final regular season game. His finger was repaired with a steel plate and pins, and he wasn't allowed to throw until the week before the bowl game. Trailing 7–3 going into the 4th quarter against Michigan State in the Liberty Bowl, Brohm threw for two touchdowns in the final minute leading the Cardinals to an 18–7 victory.

== Professional career ==
=== Baseball ===
After high school, Brohm was drafted in the seventh round of the 1989 MLB draft by the Montreal Expos. He turned down the Expos offer, choosing instead to play college football for Louisville. However, after one year of college football, he had a change of heart and decided to pursue both sports, playing minor league baseball during his college summers.

He held a workout for all MLB teams prior to the 1990 MLB draft and was selected by the Cleveland Indians in the fourth round and chose to play baseball and football. He played for two summers in the minor leagues before quitting to focus on football. The Indians also pushed him to drop football entirely.

=== Football ===
Pre-draft measurables
Height	Weight	Arm length	Hand span	20-yard shuttle	Vertical jump
6 ft 0 3/4 in (1.85 m)	208 lb (94 kg)	30 in (0.76 m)	9 1/2 in (0.24 m)	4.23 s	34.5 in (0.88 m)

==== San Diego Chargers ====
After going undrafted in the 1994 NFL draft, Brohm signed with the San Diego Chargers in 1994 as an undrafted free agent. Brohm beat out Trent Green to become the team's third-string quarterback. Brohm spent the season as the third-string quarterback, never appearing in a game as the Chargers lost Super Bowl XXIX.

==== Washington Redskins ====
Brohm signed with the Washington Redskins for the 1995 season.

==== San Francisco 49ers ====
Brohm signed with the San Francisco 49ers in 1996. Brohm played in the season opener for the 49ers in 1997 after Steve Young was sacked seven times and left the game with a concussion. Brohm was in line to start Week 2 for the 49ers, but he cracked a bone near the base of his middle finger on his passing hand. Brohm didn't make a start, instead Jim Druckenmiller made the start for the 49ers.

==== Tampa Bay Buccaneers ====
Brohm signed with the Tampa Bay Buccaneers in 1998, competing with Steve Walsh and Scott Milanovich for the backup quarterback position behind Trent Dilfer. After just three plays in the Buccaneers first preseason game, Brohm scrambled and slid to avoid being hit, but on the slide Brohm tore a ligament in his right thumb. Brohm had to decide between wearing a cast for 4 weeks hoping his thumb would heal, or have surgery and heal the thumb properly, but ending his season. Brohm elected to have surgery on his thumb, where a pin was placed in his thumb during his August 10 surgery. Two weeks later, Brohm was placed on injured reserve, ending his season. After the season, Brohm requested he be waived by the Buccaneers, and the team granted him his wish on April 25, 1999.

==== Denver Broncos ====
Brohm signed with the Denver Broncos in 1999. On August 16, 2000, Brohm was waived by the Broncos.

==== Cleveland Browns ====
On December 13, 2000, Brohm was signed by the Cleveland Browns to be the emergency third-string quarterback with one week remaining in the season.

==== Orlando Rage ====
On October 28, 2000, Brohm was drafted with the fourth overall pick in the XFL draft by the Orlando Rage of the XFL. Brohm briefly left the Rage when he signed with the Browns. Brohm battled with Brian Kuklick for the starting quarterback position with the Rage. Brohm won the starting job, and led the Rage to a season opening win 33–29 over the Chicago Enforcers. During the 2001 XFL season, he owned the league's highest QB rating at 99.9 and was named first-team All-XFL. He was at the receiving end of a particularly brutal attempted sack by Shante Carver in the Week 5 contest against the Memphis Maniax; although it knocked Brohm out of the game and led to a hospital visit, the actual play resulted in a touchdown pass, and Brohm was back on the sidelines in a neck brace later in the game. When Brohm returned to play the next week, he gave a memorable speech when asked why he returned to play so soon:

Let me answer that question by asking you two questions – One, is this or is this not the XFL? Yes, it is. Two, do I or do I not currently have a pulse? Yes, I do. Let's play football.

Brohm later admitted fearing that the statement would make him an even greater target for the Rage's opponents. A shoulder injury in the Week 7 contest against the Los Angeles Xtreme ended Brohm's playing career.

Brohm was, along with Las Vegas Outlaws running back Rod Smart, one of the few players to openly embrace the XFL's approach to football, fully immersing himself in the kayfabe and sports entertainment. Brohm had hoped to put the nickname "J Bro" on the back of his jersey, but his fellow players voted not to use jersey nicknames.

== Coaching career ==
=== Louisville Fire ===
On December 19, 2001, Brohm was named the head coach of the Louisville Fire arena football team. The Fire started the 0–7 before they defeated the Carolina Rhinos 31–28 to improve to 1–7. The Fire finished the season 2–14.

=== Louisville ===
On December 24, 2002, Bobby Petrino hired Brohm to return to his alma mater as quarterbacks coach. Brohm worked with first-year starting quarterback Stefan LeFors, helping him to a 3,145-yard passing season, the third-best in school history. LeFors finished first in the nation in passing efficiency and completion percentage and was named First-team All-Conference USA. During Brohm's second season, he helped recruit his brother Brian Brohm, who was one of the most sought-after recruits in the nation. LeFors and Brian split time at quarterback, similar to how Jeff split time as a freshman with Nagle. LeFors and Brohm led the Cardinals to the 2004 Liberty Bowl and a No. 6 ranking to end the season. Brian finished the season as the Conference USA Freshman of the Year, and LeFors was named First-team All-Conference USA and the Conference USA Co-Offensive Player of the Year. In 2005, Brian took over the starting role permanently, leading the Cardinals to an 8–2 regular season and a berth in the 2006 Gator Bowl. Brian tore his ACL, forcing the Cardinals to start walk-on Hunter Cantwell. Cantwell completed 15 of his 37 passes for 216 yards, three touchdowns, and three interceptions.

==== 2006 ====
In 2006, Brian Brohm led the Cardinals to a victory over No. 15 Miami (FL), but he injured his thumb in the process, forcing Cantwell into action. Cantwell led the team to victories over Kansas State and Middle Tennessee, with Cantwell throwing for a career-high 340 yards against Middle Tennessee, before Brian's return. The Cardinals finished the 2006 season, 12–1, establishing a record high victories for the school in a single season and winning the 2007 Orange Bowl.

==== 2007 ====
After Petrino left Louisville to take the Atlanta Falcons head coaching job, new Cardinals head coach Steve Kragthorpe kept Brohm on his staff as an assistant head coach and passing game coordinator. Brohm declined an offer to join Nick Saban's staff at Alabama in 2007 to stay with Louisville. The Cardinals offense went in a different direction under the coaching change. Brian threw 473 times, which was second in school history for a single season, but he broke the then record for passing touchdowns in a single season with 30.

==== 2008 ====
He was promoted to offensive coordinator for the 2008 season. Cantwell in his first season as the starting quarterback threw 16 touchdowns and 16 interceptions and averaged 207.8 passing yards a game. The Cardinals went 5–7 without bowl play for two consecutive years. The Cardinals offense averaged 377 yards a game, ranking 45th overall.

=== Florida Atlantic ===
Brohm joined his former college head coach Howard Schnellenberger at Florida Atlantic for the 2009 season as the quarterback coach. Brohm later revealed that he had been in contact with Schnellenberger for a month prior to the hiring. Brohm inherited Rusty Smith, who had won the 2007 Sun Belt Conference Offensive Player of the Year, to coach. After just 7 games, Smith had 1,915 yards passing to go along with 14 passing touchdowns and just 5 interceptions, but he sprained his non-throwing shoulder in the 7th game against Middle Tennessee, ending his career. With the injury, Brohm worked with Jeff Van Camp to replace Smith. Van Camp finished the year 1,372 yards passing and 12 touchdowns with just two interceptions and a win in the Shula Bowl.

=== Illinois ===
Brohm then took a position coaching quarterbacks on Ron Zook's staff at Illinois. The move to Illinois reunited Brohm with Paul Petrino, whom Brohm worked with at Louisville. Brohm and Petrino were tasked with replacing Juice Williams, and in spring camp Nathan Scheelhaase emerged as the leading candidate. The Illini named Scheelhaase the starting quarterback as a redshirt freshman, and he made strong progress throughout his first two starts. With Scheelhaase's running ability, Brohm made sure that he taught him to keep running throughout his reads before deciding to run. Scheelhaase really began to start hitting his stride during a 44–10 defeat of Purdue, throwing for four touchdowns. The Illini finished the regular season 6–6, earning a berth in the 2010 Texas Bowl.

==== 2011 ====
In year two, Brohm worked to improve Scheelhaase's passing in accuracy, decisiveness and drop backs. Scheelhaase got the Illini off to a hot start going 6–0, even defeating #22 Arizona State and Brohm had acknowledged his development as a passer. The Illini would finish the regular season 0–6, costing Zook his job. Brohm was promoted to interim offensive coordinator during the 2011 Kraft Fight Hunger Bowl.

=== UAB ===
In 2012, new head coach Garrick McGee hired Brohm to serve as offensive coordinator and quarterbacks coach at UAB. In an interview prior to the 2012 season, Brohm said he regretted not accepting the position of offensive coordinator with Alabama. The offseason began with redshirt freshman quarterback Austin Brown pushing Jonathan Perry for the starting role. After an 0–3 start, Brohm named Brown the new starting quarterback. In four of his first five starts, Brown threw for 300 yards. The Blazers finished the season 3–9, with the offense finishing 53rd in the country with 417 yards per game.

=== Western Kentucky ===
==== 2013 season ====
After a single season at UAB, Brohm decided to take a pay cut and take the assistant head coach and offensive coordinator position at Western Kentucky University, where he was again coaching under Bobby Petrino. Brohm had to replace Kawaun Jakes, who was the career leader in passing touchdowns and third in passing yards for the Hilltoppers. They selected Brandon Doughty to be the starter during the 2013 season, and he paired with the returning NCAA single season all-purpose yards record holder, Antonio Andrews. The Hilltoppers began the season with an upset of SEC foe Kentucky. Brohm's lone season as offensive coordinator did not disappoint, as the Hilltoppers averaged 459 yards per game, and both Doughty and Andrews set the single-season record for yards in a season in passing and rushing, respectively.

==== 2014 season ====
On January 8, 2014, Petrino was hired to his former position of head coach at Louisville in place of Charlie Strong, who left to replace Mack Brown at Texas. Brohm was named as a candidate to become head coach that same day. On January 10, 2014, Brohm was officially named the head coach of the Hilltoppers. On August 29, 2014, his Hilltoppers opened the season with a 59–31 win over the Bowling Green Falcons, scoring more points than during any game in the 2013 season. The team broke school records for total yards in a game (702) and most points scored since moving to the FBS level. Doughty also set three individual records. The following week Brohm suffered his first defeat as a head coach, losing 42–34 to Illinois. After losing 5 out of his first 8 games as a head coach (four of which were by a single possession), the Hilltoppers rallied to win their last four regular season games. This included a win over undefeated #19 Marshall 67–66 in overtime, again breaking the school record for points in an FBS game for the third time of the season. The Hilltoppers 7–5 regular season earned them a berth in the 2014 Bahamas Bowl where they played Central Michigan Chippewas. Leading 49–14 heading into the fourth quarter, the Chippewas rallied to be down 1-point, but their failed two-point conversion with no time left led to a Hilltoppers victory.

==== 2015 season ====
Brohm made it clear that he wanted to build the Hilltoppers program by recruiting players from Kentucky. Brohm brought in 13 players from the state of Kentucky in first full recruiting class. On September 3, 2015, Brohm won his first game as head coach against an SEC opponent, a 14–12 road win against Vanderbilt. On September 12, Western Kentucky won, 41–38, against Louisiana Tech, giving Brohm his tenth win as Western Kentucky's head coach. On September 19, Brohm and the Hilltoppers lost their first game of the season, 35–38, against Indiana. The Hilltoppers then won four straight games before traveling to Baton Rouge, Louisiana to face #5 LSU, where they were defeated 48–20. The Hilltoppers won four straight again to finish the regular season 10–2 (8–0), winning the East Division of Conference USA. On December 5, Brohm led Western Kentucky to a 45–25 victory over Southern Miss in the 2015 Conference USA championship game, giving Western Kentucky their first ever Conference USA championship in school history. The win moved Western Kentucky into #25 in the AP Top 25. This was Western Kentucky's first appearance in the AP poll since moving up to FBS. He finished his second season as the Hilltoppers' head coach with a 12–2 record, with losses against Indiana and LSU, and a victory in the 2015 Miami Beach Bowl over South Florida, 45–35. After trailing, 0–14, in the second quarter, Western Kentucky scored 24 unanswered points as they beat South Florida 24–14.

==== 2016 season ====
On February 3, 2016, Brohm agreed to a contract extension with Western Kentucky. The deal kept him under contract through the 2019 season.

After defeating Rice in the opening game of the 2016 season, Western Kentucky traveled to #1 Alabama. It was the first time Western Kentucky had played a #1 ranked team since 2012. Western Kentucky then cruised through its non-conference game against Miami (OH) before being defeated by Vanderbilt on the final play of the game. After a blowout victory over FCS Houston Baptist, Western Kentucky lost to Louisiana Tech. This was Western Kentucky's first conference lost since 2014, which was also to Louisiana Tech. In week seven, the Hilltoppers narrowly defeated Middle Tennessee 44–43 in double overtime, the program's first winning streak over Middle Tennessee since 1980. The Hilltoppers then won their next five games by a minimum of 28 points, once again winning the East Division advancing to the 2016 Conference USA championship game. The championship game was a highly anticipated re-match against Louisiana Tech. In a game that went on to be the highest scoring FBS conference championship game to date, Western Kentucky finally defeated Skip Holtz's Bulldogs 58–44. On December 4, 2016, Western Kentucky accepted a bid to the 2016 Boca Raton Bowl. They defeated Memphis 51–31.

=== Purdue ===
==== 2017 season ====
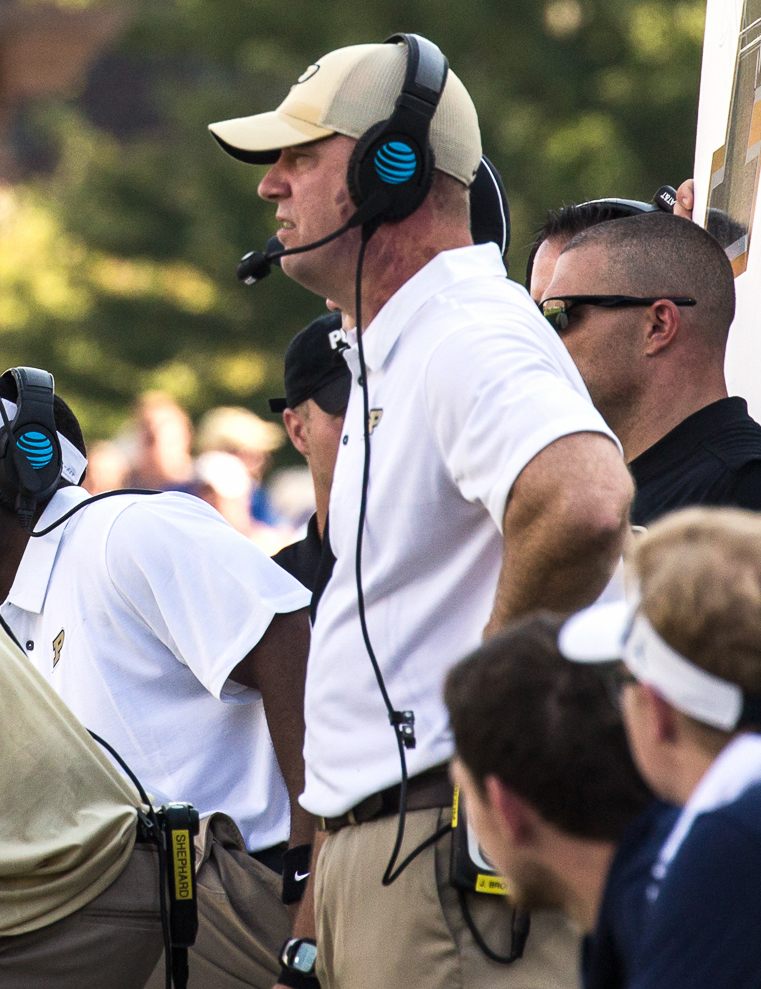
Brohm with Purdue in 2017

On December 5, 2016, Purdue University hired Brohm to be the head coach of the football team. He went to work on recruiting primarily the offensive and defensive lines as well as wide receiver, bringing in five graduate transfers to help get instant depth, including two offensive linemen and a wide receiver. In his first ever game as head coach, Purdue lost to by #16 Louisville 35–28 at Lucas Oil Stadium. The next week Brohm achieved his first win at Purdue with a 44–21 victory over Ohio and followed that with a blowout win (35–3) at Missouri. Purdue hosted #8 Michigan the next week in a game that many Purdue fans saw as the turnaround they had been waiting for since Joe Tiller, despite losing 28–10. The game saw a sold out Ross Ade Stadium, its first sell out since 2008 in Tiller's final game as the Purdue head coach. Heading into week 8, Brohm and his team went into High Point Solutions Stadium to face Rutgers as they looked to improve 4–3 on the season, but fell short on a two-point conversion, losing the game 12–14. However, Purdue won the fourth game of the season against Lovie Smith's Illinois team. This was the first time Purdue had won 4 games in one season since Danny Hope's final season at Purdue. In week 13, Purdue went into Iowa and won their biggest game of the season with a 24–15 win over the Hawkeyes. Purdue followed it up with the high point of the season taking the Old Oaken Bucket in a win against Indiana 31–24. Entering that rivalry game, both teams were 5–6, meaning the winner would become bowl eligible. Purdue's win was the first for the program against their in-state rivals since 2012. The six wins was enough to get Purdue into the 2017 Foster Farms Bowl, where they would face Arizona. The bowl game made Brohm only the second head coach in Purdue history, after Tiller, to take Purdue to a bowl game in their first season as head coach.

Before the bowl game, there was much speculation surrounding Jeff Brohm around the head coaching vacancy at Tennessee, some sources even saying that he had accepted the job. However, the two sides never met, killing the speculations after a few hours.

Purdue headed into the Foster Farms Bowl game as slight underdogs, but went on to beating Arizona 38–35, thanks in help to an Elijah Sindelar touchdown pass in the closing minutes of the game.

==== 2018 season ====
On April 26, 2018, Brohm agreed to a contract extension with Purdue. The deal ran through the 2024 season.

In the opening game of the season, which was also the home and conference opener, the Boilermakers were defeated by Northwestern 27–31. In their next game, the Boilermakers were defeated on a last second field goal by Eastern Michigan 19–20. In their next game Missouri, the Boilermakers fell 37–40, with David Blough setting a program record with 572 yards passing. On homecoming, the Boilermakers then defeated #23 Boston College 30–13. The following week, Purdue beat Nebraska 42–28. After the bye week, Purdue then went to Champaign and defeated Illinois 46–7 for its 3rd consecutive victory over the Fighting Illini. The following week, the Boilermakers defeated #2 Ohio State 49–20. In their 5th conference game, Purdue was defeated by Michigan State 13–23. The following week, Purdue returned home to take on #19 Iowa. The Boilermakers beat the Hawkeyes 38–36. The Boilermakers then got beat by Minnesota 10–41. The Boilermakers then were defeated by Wisconsin 44–47 in three overtimes. In the Old Oaken Bucket, Purdue won consecutive games against Indiana for the first time since 2012, defeating the Hoosiers 28–21. The win secured Purdue's 2nd consecutive bowl game since the 2012 season. Following the season, Purdue was selected for the Music City Bowl. In the bowl game against Auburn, Brohm suffered his worst loss at Purdue, losing 14–63. Brohm fell to 1–1 in Bowl Games at Purdue. The Boilermakers finished the season 6–7.

==== 2019 season ====
In their opening game, Purdue was defeated by Nevada 31–34. In the home opener, the Purdue rolled Vanderbilt 42–24. In their final non-conference game, Purdue hosted TCU, and were defeated, 13–34. Following the bye week, Purdue was then defeated by Minnesota 31–38. Purdue then traveled to University Park, where they were defeated by #12 Penn State 7–35. Purdue then returned home for homecoming and defeated Maryland 40–14. In the next game, the Boilermakers had a loss to #23 Iowa 20–26. In the battle for the Purdue Cannon, Purdue got its 1st loss to Illinois in 4 years, 6–24, securing Brohm's first season without a bowl game. In its second consecutive home game, Purdue took on Nebraska. Purdue handed Nebraska another loss, 31–27. The next week, Purdue defeated Northwestern 24–22. After a second bye week, the Boilermakers were dominated bye #12 Wisconsin 24–42. In the Old Oaken Bucket, Brohm suffered his first loss to rival Indiana 41–44. The Boilermakers finished the season 4–8.

==== 2020 season ====
In his 4th season, due to the COVID-19 pandemic in the United States, Purdue's season was cut to an all conference, eight-game season beginning on October 24. On October 19, 2020, Brohm tested positive for COVID-19. In the season opener, Purdue opened at home and defeated Iowa 24–20, with offensive coordinator and younger brother Brian Brohm leading the team as acting head coach. On October 26, Brohm returned a positive COVID-19 test. In the first road game, Brohm was back on the sideline, Purdue defeated Illinois 31–24. The following week Brohm was scheduled to take on Wisconsin, but the game was canceled due to a high number of Badger players testing positive for the COVID-19 virus. The next week, the Boilermakers were beaten by #23 Northwestern 20–27. The Boilermakers then travelled to Minneapolis where they were defeated by Minnesota. The next week, Purdue was beaten by Rutgers 30–37. Purdue finished the regular season after being defeated by Nebraska 27–37. The following week, Purdue was scheduled to play Indiana, but Purdue and Indiana announced a mutual one-time cancellation of the Old Oaken Bucket game scheduled for December 12 after team-related activities were paused because of an elevated number of coronavirus cases within both the Boilermakers' and Hoosiers' programs. On December 13, Purdue and Indiana came to a mutual agreement to reschedule the Old Oaken Bucket game for one week later, on December 18; however, on December 15, both teams again mutually agreed to cancel the Friday contest, due to issues remaining on both teams with COVID complications.

==== 2021 season ====
In the home opener, Purdue defeated Oregon State 30–21 in their first meeting since the 1967 season. In the first road game, the Boilermakers shutout UConn 49–0. The following week, Purdue traveled to Notre Dame to take on #12 Notre Dame. The Boilermakers were defeated 13–27. In the conference opener, The Boilermakers won a close game 13–9 over Illinois. The next week at homecoming, Purdue was defeated by Minnesota 13–20. Following the bye week, Purdue then took on #2 Iowa winning 24–7. Following the defeat of #2 Iowa, Purdue was ranked #25 in the AP Poll. It was the first time Purdue had been ranked in the AP Poll since 2007. Purdue then returned home to play Wisconsin. The Boilermakers fell 13–30. The next week, Purdue bounced back defeating Nebraska 28–23. Purdue then returned home, defeating #3 Michigan State 40–29. Purdue then traveled to Columbus, where they were blown out by #4 Ohio State 31–59. Purdue wrapped up its road games against Northwestern winning 32–14, in a game played at Wrigley Field. On Senior day, Purdue won in a blowout, 44–7 over Indiana in the Old Oaken Bucket game. The win secured Brohm his 1st winning regular season at Purdue. The win also gave him his 2nd season over .500 at Purdue. The Boilermakers finished the regular season 8–4. Purdue received a bid to play against Tennessee in the Music City Bowl. The Boilermakers won a 48–45 overtime thriller to capture Purdue's first 9-win season since 2003.

==== 2022 season ====
In the home opener, Purdue was defeated by Penn State, 31–35. The following week, Purdue shutout Indiana State 56–0. Following the shutout win, Purdue traveled to Syracuse to take on the Syracuse Orange, where they lost 29–32. The next week was homecoming week, where Purdue delivered a 28–26 win over Florida Atlantic. The next week, Purdue took on #21 Minnesota, where they won 20–10. The Boilermakers then traveled to Maryland, where they pulled out a 31–29 win. Purdue returned home the next week to face Nebraska, where they won 43–37 in a high-scoring shootout. Purdue then traveled to Wisconsin, where they lost 24–35. Following the loss to the Badgers, Purdue returned home to play Iowa, and lost 3–24. Purdue bounced back the next week at #21 Illinois, defeating the Illini 31–24. Purdue returned home to West Lafayette the next weekend, where they beat Northwestern 17–9. Following Iowa's loss to Nebraska on November 25, Purdue had an opportunity to clinch the Big Ten West by beating Indiana. The Boilermakers were up to the task, routing the Hoosiers 30–16 in front of a sellout crowd. Following the victory, Purdue was Big Ten West Champions for the first time in school history and earned the right to face undefeated #2 Michigan at the Big Ten Championship Game in Indianapolis. Purdue then went on to play LSU in a bowl game where they would ultimately lose. Purdue finished the regular season 8–4, with 2021–2022 as the first back-to-back 8–4 seasons or better since 1997–1998.

=== Louisville ===
==== 2023 season ====
On December 7, 2022, Brohm was hired to be the head football coach at his alma mater, Louisville, following Scott Satterfield's departure to become head coach at the University of Cincinnati. The Cardinals began the season 6–0. This streak was capped off by a win at home in front of a record crowd over top 10 Notre Dame.

Louisville clinched a spot in the 2023 ACC Championship Game with a win over Miami on the road, marking the programs first appearance since joining the conference in 2014. The Cardinals finished the regular season 10–2 with a 7–1 conference record. Louisville went on to lose to #4 Florida State 16–6 in the ACC Championship Game.

The Cards ended the season in the 2023 Holiday Bowl against the USC Trojans, where they lost 28–42. Louisville finished the season with three straight loses to end the season with a 10–4 record.

==== 2024 season ====
In part due to a tougher schedule, Louisville regressed in Brohms' second year and finished 8–4 in the regular season with a 5–3 conference record. All four loses came by one score and all but one to playoff contenders. Louisville lost on the road at national title runner-up, 14–2 Notre Dame, at home to ACC runner-up and playoff participant, 11–3 SMU, and to 10–3 Miami, who was the second team out of the playoff field. Louisville's final loss came by upset to 3–9 Stanford on a late field goal.

In their ninth game of the season, Louisville went on the road and upset #11 Clemson 33–21. This was Louisville's first ever win against Clemson and snapped the Tigers 22 game win streak in home night games. Clemson went on to win the ACC and make a playoff appearance.

The Cardinals went on the road to rival Kentucky and won 41–14, snapping a 5-game losing streak in the series. Louisville went on to defeat Washington in the 2024 Sun Bowl to finish the season with a 9–4 record.

==== 2025 season ====
The Cardinals began the season 4–0 for the first time since 2023. The win streak was capped by a comeback win over Pittsburgh where the Cards went down by 17, tied the game up, and then fell back down by 10. Louisville outscored Pitt 17–0 in the second half.

After a loss at home to ACC runner-up Virginia, Louisville went on the road and upset undefeated #2 and eventual national title runner-up Miami, snapping a 10-game home winning streak and giving the Canes their first home loss since Louisville beat them in 2023. The Cards won their first ever road game over a top 5 opponent and Brohm secured his fourth win vs an AP Top 5 team. For the third straight year under Brohm, Louisville knocked off a top 15 team.

After starting the season 7–1, Louisville lost 3 straight games. The Cards limped into their final game against rival Kentucky with multiple players out including WR Chris Bell and RBs Isaac Brown, Duke Watson, and Keyjuan Brown. Despite being shorthanded, the Cards dominated the Wildcats in a shutout and won 41–0. Walk-on freshman RB Braxton Jennings and redshirt freshman RB Shaun Boykins Jr. combined for 42 carries and 258 yards, and a touchdown.

Louisille was selected to play in the 2025 Boca Raton Bowl against Toledo. Louisville won the game 27–22 to finish the season 9–4 marking the third straight season with at least 9 wins.

== Career statistics ==
=== NFL ===
Year	Team	Games			Passing								Rushing			
Year	Team	GP	GS	Record	Cmp	Att	Pct	Yds	Y/A	TD	Int	Rtg	Att	Yds	Avg	TD
1994	SD	0	0	—	DNP											
1995	WAS	0	0	—	DNP											
1995	SF	0	0	—	DNP											
1996	SF	3	0	—	21	34	61.8	189	5.6	1	0	86.5	16	43	2.7	0
1997	SF	5	0	—	16	24	66.7	164	6.8	0	1	68.7	4	11	2.8	0
1998	TB	0	0	—	Did not play due to injury											
1999	DEN	0	0	—	DNP											
2000	CLE	0	0	—	DNP											
Career		8	0	0–0	37	58	63.8	353	6.1	1	1	79.2	20	54	2.7	0

=== XFL ===
Year	Team	Games			Passing								Rushing			
Year	Team	GP	GS	Record	Cmp	Att	Pct	Yds	Y/A	TD	Int	Rtg	Att	Yds	Avg	TD
2001	ORL	7	7	6–1	69	119	58.0	993	8.3	9	3	99.9	16	67	4.2	1
Career		7	7	6–1	69	119	58.0	993	8.3	9	3	99.9	16	67	5.2	1

=== College ===
Season	Team	Games (Note: Jeff Brohm’s statistics from his bowl game appearances are excluded, as bowl game statistics were not officially counted toward season or career totals prior to 2002.)			Passing								Rushing			
Season	Team	GP	GS	Record	Cmp	Att	Pct	Yds	Y/A	TD	Int	Rtg	Att	Yds	Avg	TD
1989	Louisville	11	0	—	9	12	75.0	118	9.8	2	1	195.9	11	27	2.5	0
1990	Louisville	11	0	—	29	55	52.7	482	8.8	4	4	135.8	55	−33	−0.6	1
1991	Louisville	2	2	1–1	24	47	51.1	217	4.6	3	2	102.4	24	−41	−1.7	0
1992	Louisville	11	11	5–6	155	297	52.2	2,008	6.8	9	12	110.9	99	−41	−0.4	2
1993	Louisville	12	12	9–3	185	304	60.9	2,626	8.6	20	9	149.2	78	45	0.6	3
Career		47	25	15–10	402	715	56.2	5,451	7.6	38	28	130.0	267	−41	−0.2	6

=== MiLB ===
Year	Team	Lg	Aff	G	PA	AB	R	H	2B	3B	HR	RBI	SB	CS	BB	SO	BA
1990	Burlington	APPY	CLE	34	153	136	25	29	8	0	2	12	10	3	15	38	.213
1991	Watertown	NYPL	CLE	17	49	46	6	10	4	1	2	6	0	1	3	12	.217
Career				51	202	182	31	39	12	1	4	18	10	4	3	12	.214

== Head coaching record ==
=== af2 ===
Team	Year	Regular season					Postseason			
Team	Year	Won	Lost	Ties	Win %	Finish	Won	Lost	Win %	Result
LOU	2002	2	14	0	.125	4th in Midwestern	—	—	—	—
Total		2	14	0	.125		0	0	–	

=== College ===
Year	Team	Overall	Conference	Standing	Bowl/playoffs	Coaches^{#}	AP^{°}
Western Kentucky Hilltoppers (Conference USA) (2014–2016)
2014	Western Kentucky	8–5	4–4	3rd (East)	W Bahamas		
2015	Western Kentucky	12–2	8–0	1st (East)	W Miami Beach		24
2016	Western Kentucky	10–3	7–1	T–1st (East)	Boca Raton‡		
Western Kentucky:		30–10	19–5				
Purdue Boilermakers (Big Ten Conference) (2017–2022)
2017	Purdue	7–6	4–5	T–3rd (West)	W Foster Farms		
2018	Purdue	6–7	5–4	T–2nd (West)	L Music City		
2019	Purdue	4–8	3–6	T–5th (West)			
2020	Purdue	2–4	2–4	6th (West)			
2021	Purdue	9–4	6–3	T–2nd (West)	W Music City		
2022	Purdue	8–5	6–3	1st (West)	Citrus*		
Purdue:		36–34	26–25				
Louisville Cardinals (Atlantic Coast Conference) (2023–present)
2023	Louisville	10–4	7–1	2nd	L Holiday	18	19
2024	Louisville	9–4	5–3	T–4th	W Sun		
2025	Louisville	9–4	4–4	T–7th	W Boca Raton		
2026	Louisville	8–3	7–2				
Louisville:		36–15	23–10				
Total:		102–59					
National championship Conference title Conference division title or championship game berth
^{#}Rankings from final Coaches Poll.; ^{°}Rankings from final AP Poll.; ‡Left before bowl game, interim head coach Nick Holt *Left Purdue to join Louisville before bowl game

== Personal life ==
Brohm's younger brother, Brian, is a football coach and a former quarterback who last played for the Winnipeg Blue Bombers. Another brother, Greg, played wide receiver at Louisville and had a stint in the Canadian Football League at the Edmonton Eskimos camp before being cut. Their sister, Kim, was a three-sport athlete at Spalding University. She played softball, volleyball, and basketball for the Pelicans (now the Golden Eagles).

Brohm married the former Jennifer L. Hawkins in 2003. They have two children, Brady and Brooke.

After Brohm turned down an offer to become Louisville head coach in November 2018 to remain at Purdue, then-Yahoo Sports journalist Pat Forde, a long-time Louisville resident, had the following to say about him:

In a profession where coaches come and go and commitment is for suckers, Brohm is wired differently. Maybe that's why, as a 47-year-old millionaire, he still drives that now-famous 2004 Honda Accord to the office. Insincerity isn't part of his makeup.
