= Terry Wright (wide receiver) =

American football player (born 1997)

No. 2 – Frankfurt Galaxy
- Position: Wide receiver
- Roster status: Injured reserve
- CFL status: American

Personal information
- Born: January 28, 1997 (age 29); Memphis, Tennessee, U.S.
- Listed height: 5 ft 10 in (1.78 m)
- Listed weight: 177 lb (80 kg)

Career information
- High school: White Station (Memphis, Tennessee)
- College: Coffeyville (2015–2016); Purdue (2017–2018)
- NFL draft: 2019: undrafted

Career history
- Seattle Seahawks (2019)*; Pittsburgh Steelers (2019)*; Miami Dolphins (2019–2020)*; Ottawa Redblacks (2021–2022); San Antonio Brahmas (2023)*; Philadelphia Stars (2023); Michigan Panthers (2024); Frankfurt Galaxy (2025–present)
- * Offseason or practice squad member only
- Stats at Pro Football Reference
- Stats at CFL.ca

Terry Dave Wright (born January 28, 1997) is an American professional football wide receiver for the Frankfurt Galaxy of the European League of Football (ELF). He played college football at Purdue.

== Early life ==
Wright attended White Station High School in Memphis, Tennessee. Wright became a top 25 player in the state of Tennessee. Purdue coach Jeff Brohm tried to recruit him to the Hilltoppers out of Memphis' High School, but he didn't qualify academically. He instead started his college career with Coffeyville Community College to play college football and track.

== College career ==
=== Coffeyville Community College ===
As a true freshman at Coffeyville CC in 2015, Wright played primarily on special teams, becoming the teams leading kick returner with 19 returns for 512 yards. The following year, Wright made in impact on offense with 50 catches for 805 yards and eight touchdowns, getting the attention of several Division I colleges.

=== Purdue ===
Wright elected to transfer to Purdue in January 2017 and joined the track team in April following spring football practice. With football, appeared in 12 games, making three starts. Wright caught 29 passes for 274 yards on the year. In Wright's senior year, he posted career highs against Iowa in yards (146) and touchdowns (three).

== Professional career ==
=== Seattle Seahawks ===
Wright was signed as an undrafted free agent by the Seattle Seahawks on May 3, 2019. He was waived by Seattle on August 31, and was re-signed to the practice squad the following day. Wright was released from the practice squad on October 18.

=== Pittsburgh Steelers ===
On November 5, 2019, Wright was signed to the Pittsburgh Steelers' practice squad. He was released on November 18.

=== Miami Dolphins ===
On November 27, 2019, Wright was signed to the Miami Dolphins' practice squad. He signed a futures contract with the team on December 31. On April 18, 2020, Wright was waived by the Dolphins.

Wright had a tryout with the Las Vegas Raiders on August 23, 2020.

=== Ottawa Redblacks ===
Wright signed with the Ottawa Redblacks of the CFL on July 13, 2021, and subsequently placed on the team's suspended list.

=== San Antonio Brahmas ===
On November 17, 2022, Wright was drafted by the San Antonio Brahmas of the XFL.

=== Philadelphia Stars ===
On February 9, 2023, Wright signed with the Philadelphia Stars of the United States Football League (USFL). The Stars folded when the XFL and USFL merged to create the United Football League (UFL).

=== Michigan Panthers ===
On January 5, 2024, Wright was selected by the Michigan Panthers during the 2024 UFL dispersal draft. He was removed from the roster on February 26. Wright was re-signed by the Panthers on May 14.

=== Frankfurt Galaxy ===
On January 20, 2025, Wright signed with the Frankfurt Galaxy of the European League of Football (ELF). On June 25, he was placed on injured reserve after sustaining an injury during the team's Week 6 game against the Paris Musketeers.
