= Ja'Whaun Bentley =

American football player (born 1996)

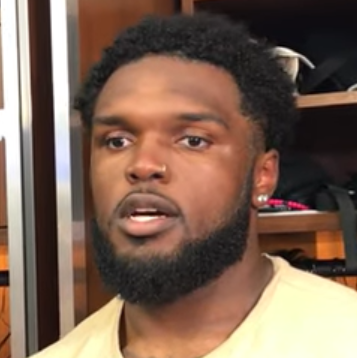
- Bentley with the New England Patriots in 2019

Profile
- Position: Linebacker

Personal information
- Born: August 24, 1996 (age 30); Glenarden, Maryland, U.S.
- Listed height: 6 ft 2 in (1.88 m)
- Listed weight: 255 lb (116 kg)

Career information
- High school: DeMatha Catholic (Hyattsville, Maryland)
- College: Purdue (2014–2017)
- NFL draft: 2018: 5th round, 143rd overall pick

Career history
- New England Patriots (2018–2024); Pittsburgh Steelers (2025)*
- * Offseason or practice squad member only

Awards and highlights
- Super Bowl champion (LIII)

Career NFL statistics as of 2024
- Total tackles: 509
- Sacks: 10.5
- Forced fumbles: 4
- Fumble recoveries: 1
- Pass deflections: 11
- Interceptions: 2
- Stats at Pro Football Reference

Ja'Whaun Louis Bentley (born August 24, 1996) is an American professional football linebacker. He played college football for the Purdue Boilermakers, and was selected by the New England Patriots in the fifth round of the 2018 NFL draft.

== College career ==
A 3-star linebacker recruit, Bentley committed to play college football at Purdue over offers from Iowa, Marshall, Maryland, Massachusetts, Pittsburgh, Rutgers, Syracuse, Virginia, and West Virginia. Bentley was a four-year starting linebacker and a three-time team captain at Purdue. As a senior in 2017, Bentley played in 12 games, starting 11, and recorded 97 tackles, one sack, two forced fumbles, three pass breakups, and one interception, which he returned for a touchdown. Bentley was named as an honorable mention All-Big Ten linebacker for his efforts in the 2017 season.

In 38 career games at Purdue from 2014–2017, Bentley recorded 272 tackles, one sack, two interceptions, seven pass deflections, two forced fumbles, three fumble recoveries, and one defensive touchdown. He was the defensive MVP of the 2017 Foster Farms Bowl.

== Professional career ==
Pre-draft measurables
Height	Weight	Arm length	Hand span	40-yard dash	10-yard split	20-yard split	20-yard shuttle	Three-cone drill	Vertical jump	Broad jump	Bench press
6 ft 1 5/8 in (1.87 m)	246 lb (112 kg)	32 in (0.81 m)	9 1/2 in (0.24 m)	4.75 s	1.66 s	2.69 s	4.40 s	7.12 s	29.5 in (0.75 m)	9 ft 3 in (2.82 m)	31 reps
All values from Pro Day

=== New England Patriots ===
The New England Patriots selected Bentley in the fifth round (143rd overall) of the 2018 NFL draft. The Patriots acquired the pick in a trade that sent their third round pick (95th overall; Tarvarius Moore) to the San Francisco 49ers for the fifth round pick and offensive tackle Trent Brown. Bentley was the 18th linebacker selected in 2018.

==== 2018 ====
On May 12, 2018, the Patriots signed Bentley to a four-year, $2.76 million contract that includes a signing bonus of $303,954.

Throughout training camp, Bentley competed against veteran Elandon Roberts to earn the job as the starting outside linebacker. On August 16, Bentley recovered a fumble forced by Adrian Clayborn and returned it 54 yards for a touchdown in the Patriots' 37–20 Week 2 preseason victory against the Philadelphia Eagles. Head coach Bill Belichick named Bentley a backup outside linebacker behind Roberts to begin the regular season.

On September 9, Bentley made his professional regular season debut and earned his first career start alongside Dont'a Hightower and Kyle Van Noy, recording seven combined tackles (four solo) and one tackle for-a-loss as the Patriots defeated the Houston Texans 27–20. In Week 3 against the Detroit Lions, Bentley recorded five combined tackles (three solo), a pass deflection, and made his first career interception on a pass from Matthew Stafford that was intended for Luke Willson in a 26–10 loss. On September 26, New England officially placed Bentley on injured-reserve, due to a torn bicep he suffered in the fourth quarter against the Lions. Bentley ended his rookie season with 14 combined tackles (nine solo), one pass deflection, one tackle for-a-loss, and an interception in three games and two starts.

Without Bentley, the New England Patriots finished the 2018 NFL season with an 11–5 record, finishing first in the AFC East. The Patriots would go on to defeat the Los Angeles Chargers 41–28 in the AFC divisional round and defeated the Kansas City Chiefs 37–31 in the AFC Championship. On February 3, 2019, the team defeated the Los Angeles Rams 13–3 to win Super Bowl LIII.

==== 2019 ====
Bentley returned in time for training camp in 2019 and competed to be a starting outside linebacker against Jamie Collins and Elandon Roberts. Head coach Bill Belichick named Bentley the primary backup linebacker behind starters Dont'a Hightower, Kyle Van Noy, and Jamie Collins.

On December 15, 2019, Bentley recorded a season-high nine combined tackles (four solo) during a 34-13 victory at the Cincinnati Bengals. He completed his sophomore season with 43 combined tackles (29 solo), two tackles for-a-loss, and one pass deflection in 16 games and two starts. The Patriots finished the 2019 NFL season atop the AFC East with a 12-4 record, but lost to the Tennessee Titans in the AFC Wildcard Game.

==== 2020 ====
Bentley entered training camp slated as a starting linebacker and was required to lead the linebacking corps after the Patriots lost their top four linebackers from the previous season. Dont'a Hightower opted out of the season due to COVID-19 pandemic while Kyle Van Noy, Jamie Collins, and Elandon Roberts left via free agency. He was named the starting middle linebacker alongside outside linebackers John Simon and Brandon Copeland.

On October 18, 2020, Bentley made 12 combined tackles (eight solo), a season-high two tackles for-a-loss, and was credited with half a sack on Drew Lock marking the first of his career as the Patriots lost 12–18 against the Denver Broncos. In Week 8, against the Buffalo Bills, Bentley recorded his first full sack of his career on Josh Allen during the 24–21 loss.

==== 2021 ====
Prior to the start of the 2021 season, Bentley changed his jersey number from 51 to 8 becoming the first Patriots player to use a new number with the new relaxed jersey number rule.

==== 2022 ====
On March 18, 2022, the New England Patriots signed Bentley to a two-year, $6.00 million contract extension that includes $3.90 million guaranteed upon signing and a signing bonus of $1.60 million. He started all 17 games in 2022, recording a career-high and team-leading 125 tackles, along with three sacks, two passes defensed, and an interception.

==== 2023 ====
On June 29, 2023, the New England Patriots signed Bentley to a two-year, $13.50 million contract extension that includes $9.00 million guaranteed upon signing and a signing bonus of $5.50 million. Bentley was signed to remain with the Patriots throughout the 2025 NFL season.

==== 2024 ====
Bentley played the first two games for the Patriots in 2024, recording 12 combined tackles. In the team's Week 2 game against the Seattle Seahawks, he suffered a torn pectoral muscle and was ruled out for the remainder of the season.

On March 28, 2025, Bentley was released by the Patriots.

=== Pittsburgh Steelers ===
On September 17, 2025, Bentley signed with the Pittsburgh Steelers' practice squad. He was released on October 7.
