= 2018 Purdue Boilermakers football team =

American college football season

2018 Purdue Boilermakers football

Music City Bowl, L 14–63 vs. Auburn
- Conference: Big Ten Conference
- West Division
- Record: 6–7 (5–4 Big Ten)
- Head coach: Jeff Brohm (2nd season)
- Co-offensive coordinators: Brian Brohm (2nd season); JaMarcus Shephard (1st season)
- Offensive scheme: Spread
- Co-defensive coordinators: Nick Holt (2nd season); Anthony Poindexter (2nd season)
- Base defense: 4–3
- Home stadium: Ross–Ade Stadium

Uniform
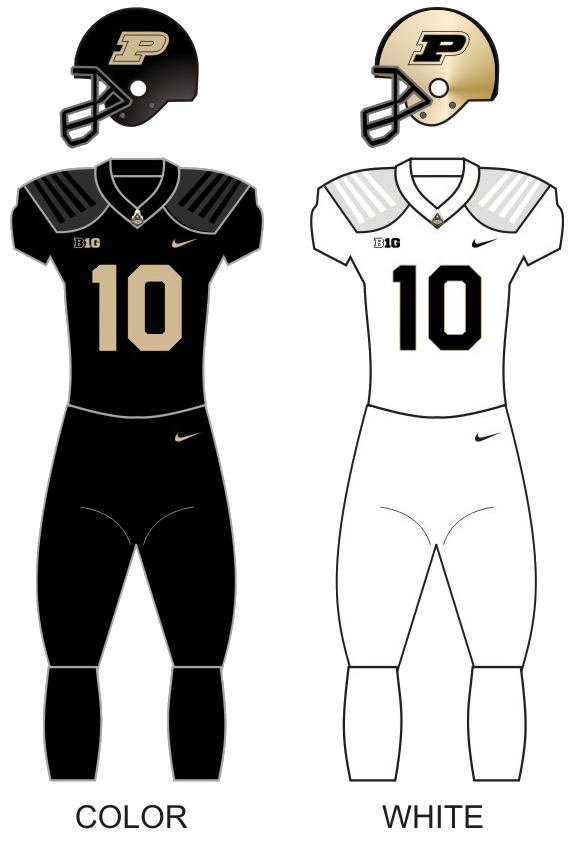

2018 Big Ten Conference football standings
	Conf.			Overall
Team	W		L	W		L
East Division
No. 3 Ohio State xy$	8	–	1	13	–	1
No. 14 Michigan x	8	–	1	10	–	3
No. 17 Penn State	6	–	3	9	–	4
Michigan State	5	–	4	7	–	6
Maryland	3	–	6	5	–	7
Indiana	2	–	7	5	–	7
Rutgers	0	–	9	1	–	11
West Division
No. 21 Northwestern xy	8	–	1	9	–	5
Wisconsin	5	–	4	8	–	5
No. 25 Iowa	5	–	4	9	–	4
Purdue	5	–	4	6	–	7
Minnesota	3	–	6	7	–	6
Nebraska	3	–	6	4	–	8
Illinois	2	–	7	4	–	8
Championship: Ohio State 45, Northwestern 24
$ – Conference champion; x – Division champion/co-champions; y – Championship game participant; Rankings from AP Poll

The 2018 Purdue Boilermakers football team represented Purdue University during the 2018 NCAA Division I FBS football season. The Boilermakers played their home games at Ross–Ade Stadium in West Lafayette, Indiana and competed in the West Division of the Big Ten Conference. They were led by second-year head coach Jeff Brohm.

Purdue began the year with three consecutive losses, each by less than four points, at the hands of Northwestern, Eastern Michigan, and Missouri. Their luck began to turn as they went on a four-game winning streak, which started with a victory over No. 23 Boston College and ended with an upset victory over No. 2 Ohio State, the school's first win over a top-two ranked team since 1984. The Boilermakers also secured a victory over No. 19 Iowa and finished the regular season in a three-way-tie for second in the West Division with a conference record of 5–4. The team was invited to the Music City Bowl, where they lost to Auburn.

The Boilermakers were led on offense by quarterback David Blough, who finished in second in the conference behind Ohio State's Dwayne Haskins in passing yards (3,705), completions (305), and completion percentage (66%). Freshman wide receiver and return specialist Rondale Moore was named first-team All-Big Ten at wide receiver, and was a consensus first-team All-American as a return specialist. He led the Big Ten Conference with 114 receptions, 1,258 receiving yards, and 12 receiving touchdowns.

== Offseason ==
=== 2018 NFL draft ===
Round	Pick	Team	Player	Position
5	143	New England Patriots	Ja'Whaun Bentley	LB

=== Recruiting ===
The Boilermakers signed a total of 24 recruits.

College recruiting (2018)
Name	Hometown	School	Height	Weight	Commit date
Jaylan Alexander; LB	River Grove, Illinois	Hoffman Estates High School	6 ft 0 in (1.83 m)	239 lb (108 kg)	Jun 5, 2017
Jaylan Alexander; LB	Recruit ratings: Scout: Rivals: 247Sports: ESPN:				
Jack Plummer; QB	Gilbert, Arizona	Gilbert High School	6 ft 5 in (1.96 m)	212 lb (96 kg)	Jun 8, 2017
Jack Plummer; QB	Recruit ratings: Scout: Rivals: 247Sports: ESPN:				
Kadin Smith; S	Louisville, Kentucky	Spencer County High School	6 ft 0 in (1.83 m)	189 lb (86 kg)	Jun 9, 2017
Kadin Smith; S	Recruit ratings: Scout: Rivals: 247Sports: ESPN:				
Elijah Ball; DB	Indianapolis, Indiana	Ben Davis High School	6 ft 1 in (1.85 m)	190 lb (86 kg)	Jun 11, 2017
Elijah Ball; DB	Recruit ratings: Scout: Rivals: 247Sports: ESPN:				
Jack Cravaack; TE	Cincinnati, Ohio	Madeira High School	6 ft 5 in (1.96 m)	224 lb (102 kg)	Jun 12, 2017
Jack Cravaack; TE	Recruit ratings: Scout: Rivals: 247Sports: ESPN:				
Charles Allen; OG	Louisville, Kentucky	Doss High School	6 ft 4 in (1.93 m)	300 lb (140 kg)	Jun 13, 2017
Charles Allen; OG	Recruit ratings: Scout: Rivals: 247Sports: ESPN:				
Eric Miller; OT	Mason, Ohio	William Mason High School	6 ft 6 in (1.98 m)	260 lb (120 kg)	Jun 17, 2017
Eric Miller; OT	Recruit ratings: Scout: Rivals: 247Sports: ESPN:				
Byron Perkins; DB	Chicago, Illinois	De La Salle Institute	6 ft 2 in (1.88 m)	175 lb (79 kg)	Jun 19, 2017
Byron Perkins; DB	Recruit ratings: Scout: Rivals: 247Sports: ESPN:				
Cory Trice; S	Hopkinsville, Kentucky	Christian County High School	6 ft 2 in (1.88 m)	163 lb (74 kg)	Jun 20, 2017
Cory Trice; S	Recruit ratings: Scout: Rivals: 247Sports: ESPN:				
Will Bramel; OT	Danville, Kentucky	Boyle County High School	6 ft 6 in (1.98 m)	260 lb (120 kg)	Jun 21, 2017
Will Bramel; OT	Recruit ratings: Scout: Rivals: 247Sports: ESPN:				
Lawrence Johnson; DT	Fort Wayne, Indiana	R. Nelson Snider High School	6 ft 4 in (1.93 m)	285 lb (129 kg)	Jun 22, 2017
Lawrence Johnson; DT	Recruit ratings: Scout: Rivals: 247Sports: ESPN:				
Jimmy McKenna; OT	Avon, Ohio	Avon High School	6 ft 5 in (1.96 m)	260 lb (120 kg)	Jun 24, 2017
Jimmy McKenna; OT	Recruit ratings: Scout: Rivals: 247Sports: ESPN:				
Kelvin Stokes; DE	Millbrook, Alabama	Stanhope Elmore High School	6 ft 2 in (1.88 m)	205 lb (93 kg)	Jul 22, 2017
Kelvin Stokes; DE	Recruit ratings: Scout: Rivals: 247Sports: ESPN:				
Jordan Bonner; WR	Carrollton, Georgia	Carrollton High School	6 ft 2 in (1.88 m)	185 lb (84 kg)	Jul 22, 2017
Jordan Bonner; WR	Recruit ratings: Scout: Rivals: 247Sports: ESPN:				
Jack Sullivan; DE	Plainfield, Illinois	Plainfield East High School	6 ft 5 in (1.96 m)	245 lb (111 kg)	Jul 26, 2017
Jack Sullivan; DE	Recruit ratings: Scout: Rivals: 247Sports: ESPN:				
Branson Deen; DE	Indianapolis, Indiana	Lawrence Central High School	6 ft 3 in (1.91 m)	255 lb (116 kg)	Jul 26, 2017
Branson Deen; DE	Recruit ratings: Scout: Rivals: 247Sports: ESPN:				
Amad Anderson; WR	Staten Island, New York	Curtis High School	5 ft 11 in (1.80 m)	170 lb (77 kg)	Nov 8, 2017
Amad Anderson; WR	Recruit ratings: Scout: Rivals: 247Sports: ESPN:				
Jordan Rucker; CB	Denton, Texas	Ryan High School	6 ft 0 in (1.83 m)	170 lb (77 kg)	Nov 12, 2017
Jordan Rucker; CB	Recruit ratings: Scout: Rivals: 247Sports: ESPN:				
Jeff Marks; DE	Mobile, Alabama	Davidson High School	6 ft 3 in (1.91 m)	260 lb (120 kg)	Dec 15, 2017
Jeff Marks; DE	Recruit ratings: Scout: Rivals: 247Sports: ESPN:				
Evan Anderson; RB	Suwanee, Georgia	Collins Hill High School	6 ft 1 in (1.85 m)	195 lb (88 kg)	Dec 16, 2017
Evan Anderson; RB	Recruit ratings: Scout: Rivals: 247Sports: ESPN:				
Kory Taylor; WR	Hilliard, Ohio	Bradley High School	6 ft 5 in (1.96 m)	200 lb (91 kg)	Dec 16, 2017
Kory Taylor; WR	Recruit ratings: Scout: Rivals: 247Sports: ESPN:				
Payne Durham; TE	Suwanee, Georgia	Peachtree Ridge High School	6 ft 5 in (1.96 m)	250 lb (110 kg)	Dec 16, 2017
Payne Durham; TE	Recruit ratings: Scout: Rivals: 247Sports: ESPN:				
Rondale Moore; WR	New Albany, Indiana	Trinity High School	5 ft 9 in (1.75 m)	175 lb (79 kg)	Jan 6, 2018
Rondale Moore; WR	Recruit ratings: Scout: Rivals: 247Sports: ESPN:				
Ja'Qurius Smith; LB	Lakeland, Florida	Lakeland High School	6 ft 3 in (1.91 m)	215 lb (98 kg)	Feb 7, 2018
Ja'Qurius Smith; LB	Recruit ratings: Scout: Rivals: 247Sports: ESPN:				
Overall recruit ranking:
Note: In many cases, Scout, Rivals, 247Sports, On3, and ESPN may conflict in their listings of height and weight.; In these cases, the average was taken. ESPN grades are on a 100-point scale.; Sources: "Purdue Football Commitments". Rivals.; "2018 Team Ranking". Rivals.com.

== Preseason ==
=== Award watch lists ===
Award	Player	Position	Year
Rimington Trophy	Kirk Barron	C	SR
Chuck Bednarik Award	Markus Bailey	LB	JR
John Mackey Award	Cole Herdman	TE	SR
Butkus Award	Markus Bailey	LB	JR
Ray Guy Award	Joe Schopper	P	SR
Wuerffel Trophy	David Blough	QB	SR
Johnny Unitas Golden Arm Award	David Blough	QB	SR
Earl Campbell Tyler Rose Award	David Blough	QB	SR

== Schedule ==
Date	Time	Opponent	Site	TV	Result	Attendance
August 30	8:00 p.m.	Northwestern	Ross–Ade Stadium; West Lafayette, IN	ESPN	L 27–31	47,410
September 8	12:00 p.m.	Eastern Michigan*	Ross–Ade Stadium; West Lafayette, IN	BTN	L 19–20	47,661
September 15	7:30 p.m.	Missouri*	Ross–Ade Stadium; West Lafayette, IN	BTN	L 37–40	48,103
September 22	12:00 p.m.	No. 23 Boston College*^{†}	Ross–Ade Stadium; West Lafayette, IN	ESPN2	W 30–13	47,119
September 29	3:30 p.m.	at Nebraska	Memorial Stadium; Lincoln, NE	BTN	W 42–28	88,911
October 13	3:30 p.m.	at Illinois	Memorial Stadium; Champaign, IL (Purdue Cannon)	FS1	W 46–7	41,966
October 20	7:30 p.m.	No. 2 Ohio State	Ross–Ade Stadium; West Lafayette, IN	ABC	W 49–20	60,716
October 27	12:00 p.m.	at Michigan State	Spartan Stadium; East Lansing, MI	ESPN	L 13–23	72,657
November 3	3:30 p.m.	No. 19 Iowa	Ross–Ade Stadium; West Lafayette, IN	ESPN2	W 38–36	60,716
November 10	3:30 p.m.	at Minnesota	TCF Bank Stadium; Minneapolis, MN	ESPN2	L 10–41	31,068
November 17	3:30 p.m.	Wisconsin	Ross–Ade Stadium; West Lafayette, IN	BTN	L 44–47 ^{3OT}	46,114
November 24	12:00 p.m.	at Indiana	Memorial Stadium; Bloomington, IN (Old Oaken Bucket)	ESPN2	W 28–21	48,247
December 28	1:30 p.m.	vs. Auburn*	Nissan Stadium; Nashville, TN (Music City Bowl)	ESPN	L 14–63	59,024
*Non-conference game; ^{†}Homecoming; Rankings from AP Poll released prior to the game; All times are in Eastern time

== Roster ==
2018 Purdue Boilermakers football team roster
Players
Coaches
Offense

Pos.	#	Name	Class
RB	1	D. J. Knox (C)	Sr
QB	2	Elijah Sindelar (C)	Jr
WR	4	Rondale Moore	Fr
WR	6	Tyler Hamilton	Fr
WR	7	Isaac Zico	Sr
RB	8	Markell Jones	Sr
WR	9	Terry Wright	Sr
WR	10	Amad Anderson	Fr
QB	11	David Blough (C)	Sr
WR	12	Jared Sparks	So
QB	13	Jack Plummer	Fr
QB	14	Danny Carollo	So
WR	15	Kory Taylor	Fr
QB	16	Aidan O'Connell	Fr
QB	17	Nick Sipe	Fr
WR	18	KeyRon Catlett	So
QB	19	Aaron Banks	Sr
WR	20	Benaiah Franklin	So
WR	21	Jordan Bonner	Fr
RB	22	Alfred Armour	Fr
RB	25	Tario Fuller	Jr
RB	28	Evan Anderson	Fr
WR	33	Jackson Anthrop	So
RB	34	Richie Worship	Jr
RB	40	Alexander Horvath	Fr
OL	50	Bearooz Yacoobi	Sr
OL	51	Bryce Brown	So
C	53	Kirk Barron (C)	Sr
OL	55	Michael Mendez	Jr
OL	56	Viktor Beach	Fr
OL	58	Jimmy McKenna	Fr
OL	60	Eric Swingler	Sr
OL	61	Ryan Flaherty	So
OL	63	Graham Keller	Fr
OL	64	Dennis Edwards	Sr
OL	65	Marc Rolland	Fr
OL	70	Will Bramel	Fr
OL	71	Sam Loebig	So
OL	72	Sam Garvin	Fr
OL	73	Ethan Smart	Sr
OL	74	Eric Miller	Fr
OL	75	Shane Evans	Sr
OL	76	Mark Stickford	Fr
OL	77	D. J. Washington	Fr
OL	78	Grant Hermanns	So
OL	79	Matt McCann	Jr
WR	80	Jarrett Burgess	Sr
TE	81	Darius Pittman	So
WR	83	Malcolm Dotson	Jr
TE	84	Jess Trussell	Jr
WR	86	Noah Ellison	Fr
WR	86	Ryan James	Fr
TE	87	Payne Durham	Fr
TE	88	Cole Herdman	Sr
TE	89	Brycen Hopkins	Jr

Defense

Pos.	#	Name	Class
CB	1	Dedrick Mackey	Fr
CB	3	Kamal Hardy	Sr
DT	9	Lorenzo Neal (C)	Jr
DB	10	Jordan Rucker	Fr
DB	11	Kadin Smith	Fr
CB	14	Antonio Blackmon	Sr
DB	17	Byron Perkins	Fr
CB	20	Kenneth Major	Fr
LB	21	Markus Bailey (C)	Jr
DB	23	Cory Trice	Fr
CB	24	Tim Cason	Sr
S	27	Navon Mosley	Jr
CB	28	Josh Abrams	Fr
CB	29	Simeon Smiley	So
LB	30	Tobias Larry	Fr
DB	32	Elijah Ball	Fr
LB	34	Jonah Williams	Fr
LB	36	Jaylan Alexander	Fr
LB	37	Asher Jones	Fr
S	38	Brennan Thieneman	So
LB	39	Zach Randall	Fr
S	40	Ronnie Hill	Jr
S	41	Jacob Thieneman (C)	Sr
CB	42	David Day	Jr
DT	44	Anthony Watts	So
LB	46	Cornell Jones	So
DT	47	Jeff Marks	Fr
LB	48	Cade Morgan	Fr
DT	50	Keiwan Jones	Sr
LB	55	Derrick Barnes	So
LB	56	Tim Johns	Fr
DL	58	Branson Deen	Fr
DL	59	K. J. Stokes	Fr
DT	62	Allen Daniels	Fr
DT	66	Alex Criddle	Jr
DE	72	Conor Sweeney	Sr
DL	90	Lawrence Johnson	Fr
DE	91	Chazmyn Turner	Jr
DE	92	Giovanni Reviere	Fr
DE	94	Robert McWilliams III	Fr
DE	95	Jack Cravaack	Fr
DT	96	Ray Ellis	Sr
DE	97	Semisi Fakasiieiki	So
DE	98	Kai Higgins	Jr
DL	99	Jack Sullivan	Fr

Special teams

Pos.	#	Name	Class
K	13	Spencer Evans	Sr
P	31	Joe Schopper (C)	Sr
K	38	Zac Collins	Fr
LS	39	Brooks Royal	Fr
K	42	Ben Bravo	Sr
K	43	Myles Homan	Jr
LS	47	Ben Makowski	Sr
LS	48	Ryan Sadkowski	Sr
K	85	J. D. Dellinger	Jr
P	96	Jake Herr	Jr

Head coach

- Jeff Brohm

Coordinators/assistant coaches

- Brian Brohm (co-offensive coordinator / quarterbacks)
- Nick Holt (co-defensive coordinator / linebackers)
- Anthony Poindexter (co-defensive coordinator / secondary)
- JaMarcus Shephard (co-offensive coordinator / wide receivers)
- Chris Barclay (running backs)
- Derrick Jackson (cornerbacks)
- Reggie Johnson (defensive line)
- Mark Tommerdahl (tight ends / special teams)
- Dale Williams (offensive line)
- Kevin Wolthausen (special teams / defense)
- JMichael Jonard (quality control)
- Dan Row (quality control)
- Ryan Wallace (quality control)
- Greg Brohm (executive director of administration and operations
  / chief of staff)
- Robert Sampson (director of internal relations)
- Eron Hodges (director of player personnel)
- Sean Pugh (director of player development)
- Max Halpin (graduate assistant)
- T. J. McCollum (graduate assistant)
- Jontavius Morris (graduate assistant)
- Justin Sinz (graduate assistant)
- Justin Lovett (director of strength & conditioning)
- Domenic Reno (senior associate director of football
  strength & conditioning)
- Dennis Love (associate director of football
  strength & conditioning)
- Jeff Eaton (assistant director of football
  strength & conditioning)
- Mitch Meador (assistant director of football
  strength & conditioning)

Legend

- (C) Team captain
- (S) Suspended
- (I) Ineligible
- Injured
- Redshirt

Roster
Last update: August 5, 2018

=== Position key ===
Back	B	Center	C	Cornerback	CB	Defensive back	DB
Defensive end	DE	Defensive lineman	DL	Defensive tackle	DT	End	E
Fullback	FB	Guard	G	Halfback	HB	Kicker	K
Kickoff returner	KR	Offensive tackle	OT	Offensive lineman	OL	Linebacker	LB
Long snapper	LS	Punter	P	Punt returner	PR	Quarterback	QB
Running back	RB	Safety	S	Tight end	TE	Wide receiver	WR

=== Depth chart ===
Defense

FS
Navon Mosley
Simeon Smiley
⋅

LB	LB	LB
Markus Bailey	Cornell Jones	Derrick Barnes
Tobias Larry	⋅	Jaylan Alexander
⋅	⋅	⋅

SS
Jacob Thieneman
Brennan Thieneman
⋅

CB
Antonio Blackmon
Dedrick Mackey
Kamal Hardy

DE	DT	DT	DE
Giovanni Reviere	Lorenzo Neal	Anthony Watts	Kai Higgins
Semisi Fakasiieiki	Keiwan Jones; Ray Ellis	Jeff Marks	Robert McWilliams III
⋅	⋅	⋅	⋅

CB
Kenneth Major
Tim Carson
⋅

Offense

WR
Rondale Moore
Jackson Anthrop
⋅

WR
Terry Wright
Jared Sparks
⋅

LT	LG	C	RG	RT
Grant Hermanns	Shane Evans	Kirk Barron	Dennis Edwards	Matt McCann
Michael Mendez	Dennis Edwards	Viktor Beach	Bearooz Yacoobi	Eric Swingler
⋅	⋅	⋅	⋅	⋅

TE
Brycen Hopkins
Cole Herdman
Darius Pittman

WR
Isaac Zico
Jarrett Burgess
⋅

QB
David Blough
Elijah Sindelar
⋅

Key reserves

Special teams
PK Spencer Evans
P Joe Schopper
KR Rondale Moore
PR Rondale Moore
LS Ben Makowski

RB
D.J. Knox
Markell Jones
⋅

== Game summaries ==
=== Northwestern ===
Northwestern at Purdue

Team	1	2	3	4	Total
• Wildcats	14	17	0	0	31
Boilermakers	14	3	7	3	27

- Date: August 30
- Location: Ross–Ade Stadium
  West Lafayette, IN
- Game start: 8:05 p.m. EDT
- Elapsed time: 3:47
- Game attendance: 47,410
- Game weather: 73°F, Sunny, NNW 5 MPH
- Referee: Mike Cannon
- TV announcers (ESPN): Dave Flemming (Play-By-Play), Kirk Herbstreit (Analyst) & Maria Taylor (Sideline)

Scoring summary
1	7:58	NW	Jeremy Larkin 1-yard run (Charlie Kuhbander kick)	NW 7–0
1	5:34	NW	John Moten IV 2-yard run (Charlie Kuhbander kick)	NW 14–0
1	4:20	PUR	Rondale Moore 32-yard pass from Elijah Sindelar (Spencer Evans kick)	NW 14–7
1	1:02	PUR	Rondale Moore 76-yardrun (Spencer Evans kick)	Tied 14–14
2	13:37	NW	Charlie Kuhbander 34-yard field goal	NW 17–14
2	7:06	NW	T. J. Green 1-yard run (Charlie Kuhbander kick)	NW 24–14
2	3:44	PUR	Spencer Evans 38-yard field goal	NW 24–17
2	:37	NW	Jeremy Larkin 4-yard run (Charlie Kuhbander kick)	NW 31–17
3	11:37	PUR	D. J. Knox 2-yard run (Spencer Evans kick)	NW 31–24
4	14:56	PUR	Spencer Evans 27-yard field goal	NW 31–27

To begin the season, Purdue hosted Northwestern, the first time the two schools opened the season against each over to open the season since 1976.

Purdue lost to Northwestern, 31–27. Northwestern scored 14 points in the first quarter via a 1-yard touchdown run from Jeremy Larkin and a 2-yard touchdown run by John Moten IV. Purdue responded with 14 points in the first quarter via a 32-yard touchdown pass from Elijah Sindelar to Rondale Moore and a 76-yard touchdown run by Moore. Northwestern regained its lead in the second quarter via a 34-yard field goal by Charlie Kuhbander and a one-yard touchdown run by T. J. Green. Purdue responded with a 38-yard Spencer Evans field and the final score of the first half came on a 4-yard run by Larkin, which made the score 31–17 in favor of Northwestern at half-time. Purdue added a 2-yard touchdown run by D. J. Knox in the third quarter. Purdue reduced Northwestern's lead to four points following a 27-yard field goal from Evans in the fourth quarter.

Moore's 313-yard all-purpose yards was the record for most in program history, and first since Otis Armstrong, who had 312 in 1972.

=== Eastern Michigan ===
Eastern Michigan at Purdue

Team	1	2	3	4	Total
• Eagles	7	3	0	10	20
Boilermakers	6	6	0	7	19

- Date: September 8
- Location: Ross–Ade Stadium
  West Lafayette, IN
- Game start: 12:01 p.m. EDT
- Elapsed time: 2:31
- Game attendance: 47,661
- Game weather: 62°F, Rain, NE 13 MPH
- Referee: Tim O'Dey
- TV announcers (BTN): Joe Beninati (Play-By-Play) & Chuck Long (Analyst)

Scoring summary
1	3:53	PUR	Spencer Evans 29-yard field goal	PUR 3–0
1	3:40	EMU	Mathew Sexton 75-yard pass from Tyler Weigers (Chad Ryland kick)	EMU 7–3
1	:26	PUR	Spencer Evans 34-yard field goal	EMU 7–6
2	:59	PUR	Markell Jones 7-yard pass from Elijah Sindelar (Spencer Evans kick failed)	PUR 12–7
2	:03	EMU	Chad Ryland 27-yard field goal	PUR 12–10
4	7:56	EMU	Breck Turner 9-yard run (Chad Ryland kick)	EMU 17–12
4	6:41	PUR	D. J. Knox 45-yard run (Spencer Evans kick)	PUR 19–17
4	:00	EMU	Chad Ryland 24-yard field goal	EMU 20–19

Following its opening game against Northwestern, Purdue hosted the Eastern Michigan Eagles. This was the first meeting between the schools since 2012, a game Purdue won in a blowout.

Purdue lost in a close game, 20–19. Purdue scored 6 points in the first quarter via a 29-yard and 34-yard field goals by Spencer Evans. Eastern Michigan added 7 points in the first quarter via a 75-yard touchdown pass from Tyler Weigers to Mathew Sexton. In the second quarter, the teams exchanged scores with a 7-yard touchdown pass from Elijah Sindelar to Markell Jones and a 27-yard field goal by Chad Ryland, which made the score 12–10 in favor of Purdue at half-time. Eastern Michigan regained the lead in the fourth quarter via a nine-yard touchdown run by Breck Turner. Purdue added seven points in the fourth quarter via a 45-yard touchdown run by D. J. Knox. Eastern Michigan finally won the game late in the fourth quarter with a 24-yard field goal by Ryland as time expired.

=== Missouri ===
Missouri at Purdue

Team	1	2	3	4	Total
• Tigers	13	14	10	3	40
Boilermakers	7	17	3	10	37

- Date: September 15
- Location: Ross–Ade Stadium
  West Lafayette, IN
- Game start: 7:40 p.m. EDT
- Elapsed time: 3:48
- Game attendance: 48,103
- Game weather: 83°F, Sunny, NNE 7 MPH
- Referee: Daniel Capron
- TV announcers (BTN): Brandon Gaudin (Play-By-Play), Glen Mason (Analyst) & Elise Menaker (Sideline)

Scoring summary
1	12:14	MO	Tucker McCann 40-yard field goal	MO 3–0
1	10:56	PUR	Terry Wright 12-yard pass from David Blough (Spencer Evans kick)	PUR 7–3
1	5:26	MO	Johnat Johnson 21-yard pass from Drew Lock (Tucker McCann kick)	MO 10–7
1	1:42	MO	Tucker McCann 29-yard field goal	MO 13–7
2	14:52	PUR	Spencer Evans 33-yard field goal	MO 13–10
2	12:33	MO	Jalen Knox 59-yard pass from Drew Lock (Tucker McCann kick)	MO 20–10
2	7:10	MO	Albert Okwuegbunam 2-yard pass from Drew Lock (Tucker McCann kick)	MO 27–10
2	2:42	PUR	David Blough 1-yard run (Spencer Evans kick)	MO 27–17
2	:09	PUR	Brycen Hopkins 3-yard pass from David Blough (Spencer Evans kick)	MO 27–24
3	8:27	PUR	Spencer Evans 29-yard field goal	Tied 27–27
3	6:48	MO	Drew Lock 8-yard run (Tucker McCann kick)	MO 34–27
3	2:30	MO	Tucker McCann 31-yard field goal	MO 37–27
4	12:16	PUR	Rondale Moore 7-yard pass from David Blough (Spencer Evans kick)	MO 37–34
4	3:28	PUR	Spencer Evans 26-yard field goal	Tied 37–37
4	:00	MO	Tucker McCann 25-yard field goal	MO 40–37

After playing Eastern Michigan, Purdue hosted the Missouri Tigers.

Missouri defeated Purdue 40–37. Missouri scored three times in the first quarter on a 40-yard Tucker McCann field goal, a 21-yard Drew Lock touchdown pass to Johnathan Johnson and another field goal by McCann from 29-yards. Purdue scored just once in the first quarter on a 12-yard touchdown pass from David Blough to Terry Wright. Purdue scored on three of its four possessions during the second quarter with a 33-yard Spencer Evans field goal, 1-yard touchdown run by Blough and a 3-yard touchdown pass to Brycen Hopkins from Blough. Missouri scored twice during the second, with a 59-yard touchdown pass to Jalen Knox and a 2-yard Albert Okwuegbunam touchdown pass from Lock. Missouri took a 27–24 lead into halftime. Purdue tied the game midway through the third quarter with a 29-yard field goal by Evans, but Missouri scored twice after the field goal with an 8-yard touchdown run by Lock and a 31-yard McCann field goal. Blough then found Rondale Moore from 7-yards out for a Purdue touchdown and a 26-yard field goal by Evans. Missouri took the lead via a 25-yard field goal from McCann as the time expired.

Blough's 572 passing yards were the most since Curtis Painter threw for 546 against Central Michigan in 2007.

=== Boston College ===
No. 23 Boston College at Purdue

Team	1	2	3	4	Total
No. 23 Eagles	7	0	0	6	13
• Boilermakers	7	16	7	0	30

- Date: September 22
- Location: Ross–Ade Stadium
  West Lafayette, IN
- Game start: 12:01 p.m. EDT
- Elapsed time: 3:10
- Game attendance: 47,119
- Game weather: 58°F, Partly Cloudy, NE 10 MPH
- Referee: Jerry McGinn
- TV announcers (ESPN2): Anish Shroff (Play-By-Play) & Ahmad D. Brooks (Analyst)

Scoring summary
1	7:48	PUR	D. J. Knox 1-yard run (Spencer Evans kick)	PUR 7–0
1	4:32	BC	Tommy Sweeney 15-yard pass from Anthony Brown (John Tessitore kick)	Tied 7–7
2	14:40	PUR	Rondale Moore 70-yard pass from David Blough (Spencer Evans kick failed)	PUR 13–7
2	6:52	PUR	Rondale Moore 9-yard pass from David Blough (J. D. Dellinger kick)	PUR 20–7
2	:05	PUR	J. D. Dellinger 21-yard field goal	PUR 23–7
3	5:57	PUR	Terry Wright 36-yard pass from David Blough (J. D. Dellinger kick)	PUR 30–7
4	0:18	BC	E. J. Perry 1-yard run (John Tessitore kick failed)	PUR 30–13

Following its game against Missouri, Purdue hosted its final non-conference game on the schedule when they hosted the No. 23 Boston College Eagles.

Purdue won in a blowout, 30–13. Purdue and Boston College each scored 7 points in the first quarter via a one-yard touchdown run by D. J. Knox, and Anthony Brown finding Tommy Sweeney on a 15-yard pass. Purdue added 16 points in the second quarter, via two touchdown passes from David Blough to Rondale Moore, the first a 70-yard and the later a nine-yard touchdown pass, and a 21-yard field goal for J. D. Dellinger, which made the score 23–7 in favor of Purdue at half-time. Purdue added 7 points in the third quarter via a 36-yard Blough pass to Terry Wright. Boston College scored a late touchdown in the fourth quarter via a 1-yard touchdown run from E. J. Perry.

Purdue ended streaks of six straight Homecoming losses and 18 straight losses to ranked opponents with its win over No. 23 Boston College. Purdue's last win against a ranked opponent came on October 22, 2011, (a homecoming game) to then-No. 23 Illinois. Purdue's 17-point margin of victory was its largest over a ranked opponent since beating then-No. 5 Michigan State by 24 points (52–28) on October 16, 1999.

=== At Nebraska ===
Purdue at Nebraska

Team	1	2	3	4	Total
• Boilermakers	10	10	15	7	42
Cornhuskers	7	0	14	7	28

- Date: September 29
- Location: Memorial Stadium
  Lincoln, NE
- Game start: 2:41 p.m. CDT
- Elapsed time: 3:42
- Game attendance: 88,911
- Game weather: 49°F, Overcast, SE 9 MPH
- Referee: Ron Snodgrass
- TV announcers (BTN): Kevin Kugler (Play-By-Play), Matt Millen (Analyst) & Lisa Byington (Sideline)

Scoring summary
1	11:20	NE	Devine Ozigbo 18-yard run (Barret Pickering kick)	NE 7–0
1	7:57	PUR	D. J. Knox 42-yard run (Spencer Evans kick)	Tied 7–7
1	3:40	PUR	Spencer Evans 31-yard field goal	PUR 10–7
2	12:51	PUR	David Blough 1-yard run (Spencer Evans kick)	PUR 17–7
2	12:30	PUR	Spencer Evans 25-yard field goal	PUR 20–7
3	8:25	PUR	Brycen Hopkins 12-yard pass from David Blough (Spencer Evans kick)	PUR 27–7
3	6:18	NE	J. D. Spielman 21-yard pass from Adrian Martinez (Barret Pickering kick)	PUR 27–14
3	3:24	PUR	D. J. Knox 6-yard run (David Blough pass to D. J. Knox conversion)	PUR 35–14
3	2:32	NE	J. D. Spielman 21-yard pass from Adrian Martinez (Barret Pickering kick)	PUR 35–21
4	2:56	PUR	Markell Jones 6-yard run (Spencer Evans kick)	PUR 42–21
4	1:04	NE	Devine Ozigbo 23-yard run (Barret Pickering kick)	PUR 42–28

After facing Boston College, Purdue traveled to Lincoln, Nebraska to face the Nebraska Cornhuskers.

Purdue defeated Nebraska 42–28. Nebraska scored seven points in the first quarter while Purdue scored ten, via an eighteen-yard touchdown run from Devine Ozigbo and a 42-yard D. J. Knox run and 31-yard Spencer Evans field goal respectively. Purdue extended their lead in the second quarter via a one-yard touchdown run from David Blough and a 25-yard Evans field goal, which made the score 20–7 in favor of Purdue at half-time. In the third quarter, Purdue and Nebraska traded touchdowns in the third quarter. Purdue struck first with a twelve-yard touchdown reception by Brycen Hopkins from Blough. Nebraska answered back with a 21-yard J. D. Spielman from Adrian Martinez. Purdue responded with a 6-yard Knox run followed by a two-point conversion. Nebraska capped the third quarter scoring with another 21-yard Spielman touchdown reception from Martinez. Purdue and Nebraska both scored a fourth quarter touchdown, on a six-yard touchdown by Markell Jones and a 23-yard Ozigbo touchdown run respectively.

Purdue won for the first time in three trips in Lincoln. Nebraska was held scoreless for 36:01 between the first and third quarters as Purdue scored 27 unanswered points Purdue played its most efficient game of the season going six-for-six on its redzone trips.

=== At Illinois ===
Purdue at Illinois
(Purdue Cannon)

Team	1	2	3	4	Total
• Boilermakers	14	15	7	10	46
Fighting Illini	7	0	0	0	7

- Date: October 13
- Location: Memorial Stadium
  Champaign, IL
- Game start: 2:40 p.m. CDT
- Elapsed time: 3:13
- Game attendance: 41,966
- Game weather: 49°F, Partly Cloudy, S 7 MPH
- Referee: John O'Neill
- TV announcers (FS1): Justin Kutcher (Play-By-Play), DeMarco Murray (Analyst) & Petros Papadakis (Sideline)

Scoring summary
1	8:07	ILL	A. J. Bush 5-yard run (Chase McLaughlin kick)	ILL 7–0
1	6:25	PUR	Isaac Zico 3-yard pass from David Blough (Spencer Evans kick)	Tied 7–7
1	4:06	PUR	David Blough 7-yard pass from Jared Sparks (Spencer Evans kick)	PUR 14–7
2	14:56	PUR	Markell Jones 1-yard run (Spencer Evans kick blocked)	PUR 20–7
2	6:15	PUR	Spencer Evans 37-yard field goal	PUR 23–7
2	0:09	PUR	Isaac Zico 42-yard pass from David Blough (Joe Schopper run failed)	PUR 29–7
3	10:06	PUR	Rondale Moore 7-yard pass from David Blough (Spencer Evans kick)	PUR 36–7
4	13:57	PUR	Spencer Evans 32-yard field goal	PUR 39–7
4	4:10	PUR	Alexander Horvath 3-yard run (Spencer Evans kick)	PUR 46–7

Following its road game against Nebraska, Purdue traveled the Illinois Fighting Illini to play for the Purdue Cannon.

Purdue won in a blowout, 46–7. Illinois got on the board first via a five-yard touchdown run from A. J. Bush. Purdue responded with a 3-yard touchdown reception by Isaac Zico from David Blough, and a 7-yard touchdown reception by Blough from Jared Sparks to close out the first quarter scoring. Purdue scored three times in the second quarter on a one-yard Markell Jones touchdown run, a 37-yard field goal from Spencer Evans and a 42-yard Zico reception from Blough to end the half with a 29–7 lead. Purdue extended their lead in the third quarter via a seven-yard touchdown reception by Rondale Moore from Blough. Purdue added 10 more points in the fourth quarter. First with a 32-yard field goal from Evans and a 3-yard touchdown run from Alexander Horvath.

Purdue's defense held Illinois to season-lows of 250 total yards, 181 passing yards and 69 rushing yards. Purdue has won 11 of the last 14 against Illinois, including four straight and eight of the last 10 in Champaign, Illinois. Isaac Zico's 127 receiving yards and two touchdowns were career bests. The 39-point win was Purdue's largest margin of victory since 2012, when it defeated Eastern Kentucky, 48–6. It was Purdue's largest margin of victory over an FBS opponent since 2008, when it crushed Indiana, 62–10. The margin of victory was also Purdue's largest in a Big Ten road game since defeat Indiana in Bloomington, 56–7 in 1997.

=== Ohio State ===
No. 2 Ohio State at Purdue

Team	1	2	3	4	Total
No. 2 Buckeyes	0	3	3	14	20
• Boilermakers	7	7	7	28	49

- Date: October 20
- Location: Ross–Ade Stadium
  West Lafayette, IN
- Game start: 7:42 p.m. EDT
- Elapsed time: 3:43
- Game attendance: 60,716
- Game weather: 37°F, Clear, NW 18 MPH
- Referee: Mark Kluczynski
- TV announcers (ABC): Chris Fowler (Play-By-Play), Kirk Herbstreit (Analyst) & Maria Taylor (Sideline)

Scoring summary
1	1:10	PUR	Isaac Zico 13-yard pass from David Blough (Spencer Evans kick)	PUR 7–0
2	14:14	OSU	Blake Haubeil 24-yard field goal	PUR 7–3
2	00:27	PUR	Rondale Moore 9-yard pass from David Blough (Spencer Evans kick)	PUR 14–3
3	12:25	OSU	Blake Haubeil 23-yard field goal	PUR 14–6
3	8:36	PUR	D.J. Knox 1-yard run (Spencer Evans kick)	PUR 21–6
4	11:39	PUR	D.J. Knox 42-yard run (Spencer Evans kick)	PUR 28–6
4	9:36	OSU	Johnnie Dixon 32-yard pass from Dwayne Haskins (Blake Haubeil kick)	PUR 28–13
4	6:46	PUR	D.J. Knox 40-yard run (Spencer Evans kick)	PUR 35–13
4	4:40	OSU	Terry McLaurin 34-yard pass from Dwayne Haskins (Blake Haubeil kick)	PUR 35–20
4	3:37	PUR	Rondale Moore 43-yard pass from David Blough (Spencer Evans kick)	PUR 42–20
4	2:08	PUR	Markus Bailey 41-yard interception return (Spencer Evans kick)	PUR 49–20

After its second consecutive away game at Illinois, Purdue returned to West Lafayette to host the No. 2 ranked, undefeated Ohio State Buckeyes.

Purdue shocked Ohio State with a 49–20 victory, during which they never trailed. David Blough found Isaac Zico with a 13-yard pass reception to give the Boilermakers the only score of the first quarter. Ohio State had to settle for a 24-yard field goal by Blake Haubeil early in the second quarter. After a fourth down conversion on a fake field goal, Rondale Moore was able to score on a 9-yard reception from Blough to end the half. In the third quarter Ohio State drove to the red zone for the second time in the game, only to come away with a 23-yard Haubeil field goal, and Purdue scored on a one-yard run from D.J. Knox. The teams traded scoring in the fourth quarter, first with Purdue on a 42-yard run from Knox, then Ohio State on a 32-yard reception by Johnnie Dixon from Dwayne Haskins, Purdue with a 40-yard run by Knox, Ohio State with a 34-yard reception by Terry McLaurin from Haskins, and Purdue with a 43-yard reception by Moore from Blough. Purdue capped the game with a 41-yard interception return by Markus Bailey.

Purdue was able to win despite Haskins setting a school record for passing yardage in a single game (470). It was the first time they beat a second-ranked team since 1984, when they also defeated the Buckeyes. Purdue swept the Big Ten Players of the Week awards (Blough for Offensive Player, Bailey for Defensive Player, Joe Schopper for Special Teams, and Moore for Co-Freshman), the first time a team has ever accomplished this feat.

=== At Michigan State ===
Purdue at Michigan State

Team	1	2	3	4	Total
Boilermakers	3	3	7	0	13
• Spartans	6	7	3	7	23

- Date: October 27
- Location: Spartan Stadium
  East Lansing, MI
- Game start: 12:02 p.m. EDT
- Elapsed time: 3:33
- Game attendance: 72,657
- Game weather: 37°F, Clear, NW 18 MPH
- Referee: Ron Snodgrass
- TV announcers (ESPN): Mark Jones (Play-By-Play), Dusty Dvoracek (Analyst) & Molly McGrath (Sideline)

Scoring summary
1	11:07	MSU	Matt Couglin 43-yard field goal	MSU 3–0
1	8:11	PUR	Spencer Evans 28-yard field goal	Tied 3–3
1	3:23	MSU	Matt Couglin 48-yard field goal	MSU 6–3
2	6:33	PUR	Spencer Evans 35-yard field goal	Tied 6–6
2	0:56	MSU	Darrell Stewart Jr 11-yard touchdown pass from Rocky Lombardi (Matt Couglin kick)	MSU 13–6
3	3:08	MSU	Matt Couglin 34-yard field goal	MSU 16–6
3	0:35	PUR	Terry Wright 1-yard run (Spencer Evans kick)	MSU 16–13
4	1:58	MSU	Jalen Nailor 48-yard touchdown pass from Rocky Lombardi (Matt Coughlin kick)	MSU 23–13

After facing Ohio State, Purdue traveled to East Lansing, Michigan to face the Michigan State Spartans. Michigan State defeated Purdue 23–13. Michigan State scored six points in the first quarter, via 43 and 48-yard field goals from Matt Coughlin. Purdue scored 3 points on a 28-yard field goal by Spencer Evans. Purdue tied the game on a 35-yard field goal by Spencer Evans. Michigan State regained the lead via an eleven-yard touchdown pass from Rocky Lombardi to Darrell Stewart Jr., which made the score 13–6 in favor of Michigan State at half-time. In the second half, Michigan State held Purdue to just 7 points while accumulating 10 points. First a field goal by Coughlin from 34-yards in the third quarter. Purdue responded with a 1-yard Terry Wright touchdown reception from David Blough. Michigan State closed out the scoring with a 48-yard touchdown pass from Rocky Lombardi to Jalen Nailor

Blough fell 23 yards shy of becoming the first quarterback in Purdue history to pass for 300 yards in four consecutive games. The loss was Purdue's eighth in a row to Michigan State, continuing a losing streak that started on Nov. 10, 2007.

=== Iowa ===
Iowa at Purdue

Team	1	2	3	4	Total
No. 16 Hawkeyes	7	10	6	13	36
• Boilermakers	14	7	14	3	38

- Date: November 3
- Location: Ross–Ade Stadium
  West Lafayette, IN
- Game start: 3:35 p.m. EDT
- Elapsed time: 3:20
- Game attendance: 60,716
- Game weather: 53°F, Mostly sunny, E 8 MPH
- Referee: Michael Cannon
- TV announcers (ESPN2): Jason Benetti (Play-by-Play), Kelly Stouffer (Analyst), & Olivia Dekker (Sideline)

Scoring summary
1	11:56	PUR	Isaac Zico 36-yard pass from David Blough (Spencer Evans kick)	PUR 7–0
1	6:15	IA	Ivory Kelly-Martin 2-yard run (Miguel Recinos kick)	Tie 7–7
1	3:40	PUR	Markell Jones 1-yard run (Spencer Evans kick)	PUR 14–7
2	10:47	IA	Miguel Recinos 34-yard field goal	PUR 14–10
2	6:27	PUR	Terry Wright 41-yard pass from David Blough (Spencer Evans kick)	PUR 21–10
2	0:17	IA	Nate Stanley 1-yard run (Miguel Recinos kick)	PUR 21–17
3	12:11	PUR	Terry Wright 82-yard pass from David Blough (Spencer Evans kick)	PUR 28–17
3	9:33	IA	T.J. Hockenson 4-yard pass from Nate Stanley (two-point pass conversion failed)	PUR 28–23
3	2:26	PUR	Terry Wright 3-yard pass from David Blough (Spencer Evans kick)	PUR 35–23
4	12:29	IA	Mekhi Sargent 1-yard run (Miguel Recinos kick)	PUR 35–30
4	10:19	IA	Mekhi Sargent 1-yard run (two-point pass conversion failed)	IA 36–35
4	0:08	PUR	Spencer Evans 25-yard field goal	PUR 38–36

After losing to Michigan State, Purdue hosted the No. 16 Iowa Hawkeyes in a sellout performance.

Purdue knocked off Iowa, 38–36 after a walk-off, 25-yard field goal by Spencer Evans. Purdue scored the first points in the first quarter by a 36-yard touchdown pass from David Blough to receiver Isaac Zico. Ivory Kelly-Martin evened the score at 7–7 nearly six minutes later; this would be the longest drive of the game. Purdue scored once again via a touchdown run from Markell Jones.

In the second quarter, Miguel Recinos opened off to kick a 34-yard field goal to make the score 14–10, Boilermakers. Purdue and Iowa then traded touchdowns, the former a touchdown pass to Terry Wright from David Blough, the latter coming from Nate Stanley, the Iowa quarterback, with 17 seconds left in the first half. The score was 21–17 at the conclusion of this half.

On the Boilermakers' opening drive of the second half, David Blough found Terry Wright for a stellar 82-yard reception. This was the Boilermakers' only play of the drive. Two and a half minutes later, the Hawkeyes also found the end zone to make the score 28–23. The Hawkeyes, however, made a controversial two-point conversion attempt, which they failed. With 2:26 left in the third quarter, David Blough found Terry Wright in the end zone to make the score 35–23. This was Wright's third touchdown reception of the game.

In the fourth quarter, Iowa mounted a comeback against the Boilermakers. Boosted by two touchdown runs following an interception from David Blough, the Hawkeyes made the score 35–23 after chasing points again. However, the Boilermakers were to make a heroic final, last-breath drive and capped their stellar effort with an amazing field goal from Spencer Evans.

Purdue earned its third win this season against an AP Top 25 ranked opponent. It is the first time since 2003 that Purdue has defeated three ranked teams in a single season. Markell Jones rushed for his 18th career touchdown, passing Otis Armstrong (17, 1970–72) for 10th on Purdue's all-time career rushing touchdowns list. Terry Wright totaled six receptions for a career-high 146 yards and three touchdowns. Wright entered the game with 474 career receiving yards and two previous touchdowns.

=== At Minnesota ===
Purdue at Minnesota

Team	1	2	3	4	Total
Boilermakers	3	0	0	7	10
• Golden Gophers	3	10	21	7	41

- Date: November 10
- Location: TCF Bank Stadium
  Minneapolis, MN
- Game start: 2:35 p.m. CST
- Elapsed time: 2:59
- Game attendance: 31,068
- Game weather: 21°F, Grey and dreary, SSE 9 MPH
- Referee: Larry Smith
- TV announcers (ESPN2): Beth Mowins (Play-By-Play), Anthony Becht (Analyst) & Rocky Boiman (Sideline)

Scoring summary
1	7:16	MIN	Emmit Carpenter 24-yard field goal	MIN 3–0
1	2:59	PUR	Spencer Evans 40-yard field goal	Tied 3–3
2	9:03	MIN	Jake Paulson 11-yard pass from Seth Green (Emmit Carpenter kick)	MIN 10–3
2	3:40	MIN	Emmit Carpenter 27-yard field goal	MIN 13–3
3	14:10	MIN	Blake Cashman 46-yard fumble return (Emmit Carpenter kick)	MIN 20–3
3	10:10	MIN	Seth Green 2-yard touchdown run (Emmit Carpenter kick)	MIN 27–3
3	4:37	MIN	Bryce Williams 11-yard touchdown run (Emmit Carpenter kick)	MIN 34–3
4	10:09	MIN	Tyler Johnson 12-yard touchdown pass from Tanner Morgan (Emmit Carpenter kick)	MIN 41–3
4	5:28	PUR	Rondale Moore 9-yard touchdown pass from David Blough (Spencer Evans kick)	MIN 41–10

After facing in-division rival Iowa, Purdue traveled to the Minnesota Golden Gophers.

Minnesota won in a blowout, 41–10. Minnesota opened the scoring in the first quarter via a 24-yard field goal by Emmit Carpenter. Purdue responded with a 40-yard Spencer Evans field goal to end the first quarter. Minnesota extended their lead in the second quarter via an 11-yard touchdown pass from Seth Green to Jake Paulson and a 27-yard Carpenter field goal, which made the score 13–3 in favor of Minnesota at half-time. Minnesota added 21 points in the third quarter via a 46-yard fumble recovery for a touchdown by Blake Cashman, a two-yard touchdown run by Green and an 11-yard Bryce Williams touchdown run. Minnesota added 7 more points in the fourth quarter via a 12-yard touchdown pass by Tanner Morgan to Tyler Johnson. Purdue finally got another score late in the fourth quarter via a nine-yard touchdown pass to Rondale Moore from David Blough.

Purdue was held to its lowest score and fewest total points since a 17–9 loss to Wisconsin in 2017. The 31-point margin of defeat was the largest Purdue had suffered since losing to Penn State by 38 points in 2016. Purdue entered the game with a 43 percent third-down conversion rate, but was 0-for-12 on third down against the Gophers.

=== Wisconsin ===
Wisconsin at Purdue

Team	1	2	3	4	OT	2OT	3OT	Total
• Badgers	0	3	10	14	7	7	6	47
Boilermakers	0	10	14	3	7	7	3	44

- Date: November 17
- Location: Ross–Ade Stadium
  West Lafayette, IN
- Game start: 3:40 p.m. EST
- Elapsed time: 3:50
- Game attendance: 46,114
- Game weather: 40°F, Cloudy, NE 6 MPH
- Referee: Jeff Servinski
- TV announcers (BTN): Kevin Kugler (Play-By-Play), James Laurinaitis (Analyst) & Rick Pizzo (Sideline)

Scoring summary
2	6:11	PUR	D. J. Knox 18-yard pass from David Blough (Spencer Evans kick)	PUR 7–0
2	1:07	WIS	Rafael Gaglianone 29-yard field goal	PUR 7–3
2	:00	PUR	Spencer Evans 20-yard field goal	PUR 10–3
3	14:40	WIS	Jonathan Taylor 80-yard field goal (Rafael Gaglianone kick)	Tied 10–10
3	6:27	WIS	Rafael Gaglianone 22-yard field goal	WIS 13–10
3	4:08	PUR	Markell Jones 12-yard run (Spencer Evans kick)	PUR 17–13
3	:57	PUR	Rondale Moore 46-yard pass from David Blough (Spencer Evans kick)	PUR 24–13
4	9:57	PUR	Spencer Evans 20-yard field goal	PUR 27–13
4	6:40	WIS	Danny Davis III 5-yard pass from Jack Coan (Rafael Gaglianone kick)	PUR 27–20
4	2:51	WIS	Danny Davis III 18-yard pass from Jack Coan (Rafael Gaglianone kick)	Tied 27–27
OT1	:00	PUR	Rondale Moore 15-yard pass from David Blough (Spencer Evans kick)	PUR 34–27
OT1	:00	WIS	Jonathan Taylor 12-yard run (Rafael Gaglianone kick)	Tied 34–34
OT2	:00	WIS	Garrett Groshek 4-yard run (Rafael Gaglianone kick)	WIS 41–34
OT2	:00	PUR	Issac Zico 25-yard pass from David Blough (Spencer Evans kick)	Tied 41–41
OT3	:00	PUR	Spencer Evans 41-yard field goal	PUR 44–41
OT3	:00	WIS	Jonathan Taylor 17-yard run	WIS 47–44

After facing Minnesota, Purdue returned home to face the Wisconsin Badgers on Senior Day.

Wisconsin defeated Purdue 47–44 in triple overtime. After a scoreless first quarter by both teams, Purdue scored ten points in the second quarter, via an 18-yard touchdown pass to D. J. Knox from David Blough and a 20-yard field goal by Spencer Evans. Wisconsin scored on a 29-yard Rafael Gaglianone field goal bring the score to 10–3 in favor of Purdue at half-time. Wisconsin opened the second half scoring when Jonathan Taylor via an 80-yard touchdown run and a 22-yard field goal by Gaglianone. Purdue responded with two third quarter touchdowns via a 12-yard touchdown run by Markell Jones and a 46-yard touchdown pass to Rondale Moore from Blough. Purdue scored first in the fourth quarter on a 20-yard Evans field goal, but two late touchdown receptions by Danny Davis III from Jack Coan of five and 18-yards respectively tied the game before regulation ended.

In the first overtime, Purdue scored on its first possession with a 15-yard touchdown reception by Moore from Blough. Wisconsin responded with a 12-yard touchdown run by Taylor. Wisconsin opened the second overtime with a 4-yard Garrett Groshek touchdown run, but Purdue responded on the next play with a 25-yard Issac Zico touchdown pass from Blough. When Purdue scored on a 41-yard Evans field goal to open the third overtime, Wisconsin scored on a 17-yard Taylor touchdown run to seal the victory for Wisconsin.

=== At Indiana ===
Purdue at Indiana
(Old Oaken Bucket)

Team	1	2	3	4	Total
• Boilermakers	7	7	7	7	28
Hoosiers	0	7	0	14	21

- Date: November 24
- Location: Memorial Stadium
  Bloomington, IN
- Game start: 12:02 p.m. EST
- Elapsed time: 3:15
- Game attendance: 48,247
- Game weather: 49°F, Cloudy, SW 12 MPH
- Referee: Jerry McGinn
- TV announcers (ESPN2): Mark Neely (Play-By-Play), John Congemi (Analyst) & Alex Corddry (Sideline)

Scoring summary
1	5:43	PUR	Issac Zico 11-yard pass from David Blough (Spencer Evans kick)	PUR 7–0
2	10:52	IU	Stevie Scott 8-yard run (Logan Justus kick)	Tied 7–7
2	4:30	PUR	Rondale Moore 56-yard pass from David Blough (Spencer Evans kick)	PUR 14–7
3	3:43	PUR	Rondale Moore 33-yard pass from David Blough (Spencer Evans kick)	PUR 21–7
4	7:33	IU	Peyton Ramsey 23-yard run (Logan Justus kick)	PUR 21–14
4	3:48	PUR	Markell Jones 32-yard run (Spencer Evans kick)	PUR 28–14
4	1:17	IU	Nick Westbrook 40-yard touchdown pass from Peyton Ramsey (Logan Justus kick)	PUR 28–21

Following its home finale against Wisconsin, Purdue traveled to Bloomington, Indiana to face its arch-rival, the Indiana Hoosiers, in the 94th playing of Old Oaken Bucket.

Purdue defeated Indiana 28–21. Purdue scored 7 points in the first quarter via an 11-yard touchdown pass from David Blough to Issac Zico. Indiana responded with 7 points in the second quarter via an eight-yard touchdown run by Stevie Scott. Purdue regained its lead in the second quarter via a 56-yard touchdown pass from Blough to Rondale Moore, which made the score 14–7 in favor of Purdue at half-time. Purdue added a 33-yard touchdown reception by Moore from Blough in the third quarter. Indiana reduced Purdue's lead to seven points following a 23-yard touchdown run from Peyton Ramsey in the fourth quarter. Purdue responded with a 32-yard touchdown run by Markell Jones. Indiana scored again with 1:17 to play on a 40-yard touchdown reception by Nick Westbrook-Ikhine from Ramsey.

Purdue finished in 3rd place of the Big Ten West Division with a 5–4 record in conference play. The win also made Purdue bowl eligible for the second consecutive year.

=== vs Auburn (Music City Bowl) ===
Purdue vs Auburn
(Music City Bowl)

Team	1	2	3	4	Total
Boilermakers	7	0	7	0	14
• Tigers	28	28	7	0	63

- Date: December 28
- Location: Nissan Stadium
  Nashville, TN
- Game start: 12:33 p.m. CST
- Game attendance: 59,024
- Referee: Brad Van Vark
- TV announcers (ESPN): Anish Shroff (Play-By-Play), Ahmad Brooks (Analyst) & Roddy Jones (Sideline)

Scoring summary
1	13:57	AUB	JaTarvious Whitlow 66-yard pass from Jarrett Stidham (Anders Carlson kick)	AUB 7–0
1	8:18	AUB	JaTarvious Whitlow 2-yard run (Anders Carlson kick)	AUB 14–0
1	6:59	AUB	JaTarvious Whitlow 1-yard run (Anders Carlson kick)	AUB 21–0
1	3:25	PUR	Rondale Moore 7-yard run (Spencer Evans kick)	AUB 21–7
1	2:48	AUB	Darius Slayton 74-yard pass from Jarrett Stidham (Anders Carlson kick)	AUB 28–7
2	12:54	AUB	Darius Slayton 52-yard pass from Jarrett Stidham (Anders Carlson kick)	AUB 35–7
2	12:29	AUB	Big Kat Bryant 20-yard interception return (Anders Carlson kick)	AUB 42–7
2	5:36	AUB	Anthony Schwartz 6-yard run (Anders Carlson kick)	AUB 49–7
2	2:01	AUB	Darius Slayton 34-yard pass from Jarrett Stidham (Anders Carlson kick)	AUB 56–7
3	7:16	AUB	Ryan Davis 5-yard pass from Jarrett Stidham (Anders Carlson kick)	AUB 63–7
3	5:29	PUR	David Blough 22-yard run (Spencer Evans kick)	AUB 63–14

== Awards and honors ==
Weekly Awards
Player	Award	Date Awarded	Ref.
Rondale Moore	Co-Big Ten Freshman of the Week	September 3, 2018	
David Blough	Big Ten Offensive Player of the Week	September 17, 2018	
Rondale Moore	Co-Big Ten Freshman of the Week	September 24, 2018	
Joe Schopper	Big Ten Special Teams Player of the Week	October 1, 2018	
David Blough	Big Ten Offensive Player of the Week	October 22, 2018	
Markus Bailey	Big Ten Defensive Player of the Week	October 22, 2018	
Joe Schopper	Big Ten Special Teams Player of the Week	October 22, 2018	
Rondale Moore	Co-Big Ten Freshman of the Week	October 22, 2018	
Terry Wright	Big Ten Co-Offensive Player of the Week	November 5, 2018	
Spencer Evans	Big Ten Special Teams Player of the Week	November 5, 2018	
Rondale Moore	Big Ten Freshman of the Week	November 26, 2018	

Individual Awards
Player	Award	Ref.
Rondale Moore	Thompson–Randle El Freshman of the Year; Richter–Howard Receiver of the Year	

All-Big Ten
Player	Position	Coaches	Media
Rondale Moore	WR	1	1
Rondale Moore	PR/KR	1	2
Markus Bailey	LB	2	3
Joe Schopper	P	3	Hon.
Brycen Hopkins	TE	Hon.	3
David Blough	QB	Hon.	3
Kirk Barron	C	Hon.	Hon.
Matt McCann	OG	Hon.	Hon.
Antonio Blackmon	DB	Hon.	Hon.
Jacob Thieneman	DB	Hon.	Hon.
Lorenzo Neal	DL	Hon.	Hon.
Spencer Evans	K	Hon.	Hon.
D.J. Knox	RB	Hon.	–
Derrick Barnes	LB	Hon.	–
Isaac Zico	WR	–	Hon.
Kenneth Major	DB	–	Hon.
Hon. = Honorable mention. Reference:
