= Markell =

Markell is a given name and a surname. Notable people with the name include:

== Surname ==
- Duke Markell, baseball pitcher
- Henry Markell, American lawyer and politician
- Jack Markell, American businessman and politician
- Jay Markell, American politician
- Jodie Markell, American actress and film director
- Patchen Markell, American political scientist

== Given name ==
- Markell Carter, American football linebacker
- Markell Johnson (born 1998), American basketball player in the Israeli Basketball Premier League
- Markell Jones, American football running back

== See also ==
- Markelle
- Markel (name)
