= 2018 Music City Bowl =

College football bowl game

2018 Franklin American Mortgage Music City Bowl
- 21st Music City Bowl
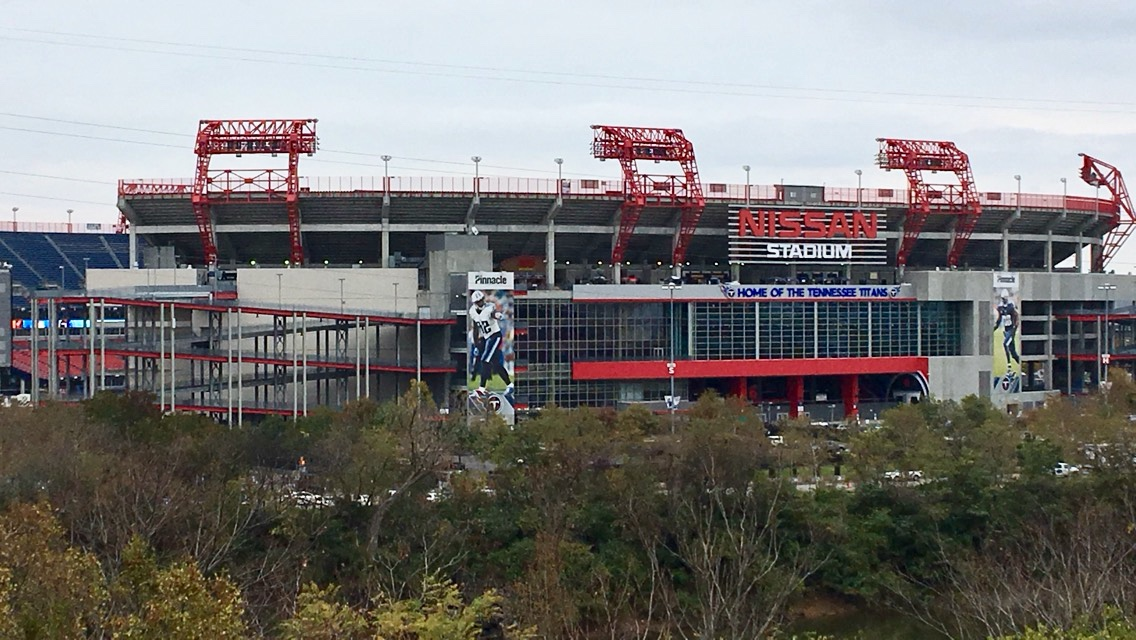
- Nissan Stadium in Nashville, Tennessee, hosted the Music City Bowl.
Purdue Boilermakers	Auburn Tigers
(6–6)	(7–5)
Big Ten	SEC
14	63
Head coach: Jeff Brohm	Head coach: Gus Malzahn
	1	2	3	4	Total
Purdue	7	0	7	0	14
Auburn	28	28	7	0	63
- Date: December 28, 2018
- Season: 2018
- Stadium: Nissan Stadium
- Location: Nashville, Tennessee
- MVP: Jarrett Stidham (QB, Auburn)
- Favorite: Auburn by 3.5
- Referee: Brad Van Vark (Big 12)
- Attendance: 59,024
- Payout: US$5,650,000

United States TV coverage
- Network: ESPN; ESPN Radio
- Announcers: TV: Anish Shroff, Ahmad Brooks, Roddy Jones; Radio: Dave Neal, D.J. Shockley, Dawn Davenport

The 2018 Music City Bowl was a college football bowl game played on December 28, 2018 at Nissan Stadium in Nashville, Tennessee. It was the 21st edition of the Music City Bowl, and one of the 2018–19 bowl games concluding the 2018 FBS football season. Sponsored by the Franklin American Mortgage Company, the game was officially known as the Franklin American Mortgage Music City Bowl.

Despite being projected as a close game, Auburn was able create an early 21–0 lead. Purdue then put a touchdown on the board to make it 21–7, but Auburn then scored 35 unanswered points to end the half. The halftime score was 56–7, with Auburn setting the NCAA FBS record for points scored in any half of a bowl game. The final score of the game was 63–14.

== Teams ==
The game was played between Purdue from the Big Ten Conference and Auburn from the Southeastern Conference (SEC). The teams had never played each other before.

=== Purdue Boilermakers ===
Purdue received and accepted a bid to the Music City Bowl on December 2. The Boilermakers entered the bowl with a 6–6 record (5–4 in conference).

This game was the last attended by Purdue superfan Tyler Trent, who had become a national inspiration during his battle with terminal osteosarcoma. He and his family traveled to Nashville on an airplane normally used by the Indianapolis Colts, courtesy of team owner Jim Irsay. Trent, who served as an honorary Purdue captain for the game, died four days later on New Year's Day.

=== Auburn Tigers ===
Auburn received and accepted a bid to the Music City Bowl on December 2. The Tigers entered the bowl with a 7–5 record (3–5 in conference).

== Game summary ==
=== Scoring summary ===
Scoring summary

Quarter	Time	Drive			Team	Scoring information	Score	
Quarter	Time	Plays	Yards	TOP	Team	Scoring information	PUR	AUB
1	13:57	3	75	1:03	AUB	JaTarvious Whitlow 66-yard touchdown reception from Jarrett Stidham, Anders Carlson kick good	0	7
1	8:18	9	87	2:10	AUB	JaTarvious Whitlow 2-yard touchdown run, Anders Carlson kick good	0	14
1	6:59	3	18	0:28	AUB	JaTarvious Whitlow 1-yard touchdown run, Anders Carlson kick good	0	21
1	3:25	12	78	3:34	PUR	Rondale Moore 7-yard touchdown run, Spencer Evans kick good	7	21
1	2:48	2	75	0:37	AUB	Darius Slayton 74-yard touchdown reception from Jarrett Stidham, Anders Carlson kick good	7	28
2	12:54	2	44	0:41	AUB	Darius Slayton 52-yard touchdown reception from Jarrett Stidham, Anders Carlson kick good	7	35
2	12:29				AUB	Interception returned 20 yards for touchdown by Big Kat Bryant, Anders Carlson kick good	7	42
2	5:36	12	65	4:51	AUB	Anthony Schwartz 6-yard touchdown run, Anders Carlson kick good	7	49
2	2:01	4	49	1:03	AUB	Darius Slayton 34-yard touchdown reception from Jarrett Stidham, Anders Carlson kick good	7	56
3	7:16	12	78	6:28	AUB	Ryan Davis 5-yard touchdown reception from Jarrett Stidham, Anders Carlson kick good	7	63
3	5:29	6	65	1:47	PUR	David Blough 22-yard touchdown run, Spencer Evans kick good	14	63
"TOP" = time of possession. For other American football terms, see Glossary of American football.							14	63

=== Statistics ===
	1	2	3	4	Total
Boilermakers	7	0	7	0	14
Tigers	28	28	7	0	63

Statistics	PUR	AUB
First downs	17	24
Plays–yards	65–263	75–586
Rushes–yards	27–79	52–208
Passing yards	184	378
Passing: comp–att–int	22–38–2	16–23–0
Time of possession	25:49	34:11

Team	Category	Player	Statistics
Purdue	Passing	David Blough	22–37, 184 yds, 2 INT
Purdue	Rushing	Markell Jones	10 car, 35 yds
Purdue	Receiving	Rondale Moore	11 rec, 94 yds
Auburn	Passing	Jarrett Stidham	15–21, 373 yds, 5 TD
Auburn	Rushing	Kam Martin	11 car, 58 yds
Auburn	Receiving	Darius Slayton	3 rec, 160 yds, 3 TD
