= 2018 Auburn Tigers football team =

American college football season

2018 Auburn Tigers football

Music City Bowl champion

Music City Bowl, W 63–14 vs. Purdue
- Conference: Southeastern Conference
- Western Division
- Record: 8–5 (3–5 SEC)
- Head coach: Gus Malzahn (6th season)
- Offensive coordinator: Chip Lindsey (2nd season)
- Co-offensive coordinator: Kodi Burns (3rd season)
- Defensive coordinator: Kevin Steele (3rd season)
- Home stadium: Jordan–Hare Stadium

2018 Southeastern Conference football standings
	Conf.			Overall
Team	W		L	W		L
Eastern Division
No. T–7 Georgia x	7	–	1	11	–	3
No. 12 Kentucky	5	–	3	10	–	3
No. T–7 Florida	5	–	3	10	–	3
South Carolina	4	–	4	7	–	6
Missouri	4	–	4	8	–	5
Vanderbilt	3	–	5	6	–	7
Tennessee	2	–	6	5	–	7
Western Division
No. 2 Alabama x$^	8	–	0	14	–	1
No. 16 Texas A&M	5	–	3	9	–	4
No. 6 LSU	5	–	3	10	–	3
Mississippi State*	4	–	4	8	–	5
Auburn	3	–	5	8	–	5
Ole Miss	1	–	7	5	–	7
Arkansas	0	–	8	2	–	10
Championship: Alabama 35, Georgia 28
^ – College Football Playoff participant; $ – Conference champion; x – Division champion/co-champions; * Mississippi State vacated four conference and eight total wins due to NCAA violations.; Rankings from AP Poll

The 2018 Auburn Tigers football team represented Auburn University in the 2018 NCAA Division I FBS football season. The Tigers played their home games at Jordan–Hare Stadium in Auburn, Alabama and competed in the Western Division of the Southeastern Conference (SEC). They were led by sixth-year head coach Gus Malzahn. The Tigers finished the season 8–5, 3–5 in SEC play to finish 5th in the West Division. They were invited to the Music City Bowl, where they defeated Purdue.

== Recruiting ==
=== Recruits ===
The Tigers signed a total of 24 recruits.

College recruiting (2018)
Name	Hometown	School	Height	Weight	Commit date
Joey Gatewood; QB	Jacksonville, Florida	Bartram Trail High School	6 ft 4 in (1.93 m)	232 lb (105 kg)	Dec 5, 2015
Joey Gatewood; QB	Recruit ratings: Scout: Rivals: 247Sports: ESPN:				
Shaun Shivers; RB	Hollywood, Florida	Chaminade-Madonna College Preparatory School	5 ft 7 in (1.70 m)	174 lb (79 kg)	Oct 26, 2016
Shaun Shivers; RB	Recruit ratings: Scout: Rivals: 247Sports: ESPN:				
Jalil Irvin; OG	Stone Mountain, Georgia	Stephenson High School	6 ft 3 in (1.91 m)	296 lb (134 kg)	Mar 8, 2017
Jalil Irvin; OG	Recruit ratings: Scout: Rivals: 247Sports: ESPN:				
Kameron Stutts; OG	Killen, Alabama	Brooks High School	6 ft 4 in (1.93 m)	329 lb (149 kg)	Apr 8, 2017
Kameron Stutts; OG	Recruit ratings: Scout: Rivals: 247Sports: ESPN:				
Kolbi Fuqua; WR	Cordova, Alabama	Cordova High School	6 ft 1 in (1.85 m)	210 lb (95 kg)	Apr 8, 2017
Kolbi Fuqua; WR	Recruit ratings: Scout: Rivals: 247Sports: ESPN:				
Daquan Newkirk; DE	Windermere, Florida	Mississippi Gulf Coast Community College	6 ft 3 in (1.91 m)	282 lb (128 kg)	Jun 1, 2017
Daquan Newkirk; DE	Recruit ratings: Scout: Rivals: 247Sports: ESPN:				
Shedrick Jackson; WR	Birmingham, Alabama	Hoover High School	6 ft 2 in (1.88 m)	205 lb (93 kg)	Jun 26, 2017
Shedrick Jackson; WR	Recruit ratings: Scout: Rivals: 247Sports: ESPN:				
Quindarious Monday; S	Atlanta, Georgia	Carver High School	6 ft 3 in (1.91 m)	185 lb (84 kg)	Jul 11, 2017
Quindarious Monday; S	Recruit ratings: Scout: Rivals: 247Sports: ESPN:				
Josh Marsh; LB	Decatur, Alabama	Decatur High School	6 ft 2 in (1.88 m)	216 lb (98 kg)	Jul 21, 2017
Josh Marsh; LB	Recruit ratings: Scout: Rivals: 247Sports: ESPN:				
Michael Harris; LB	Tucker, Georgia	Tucker High School	6 ft 2 in (1.88 m)	213 lb (97 kg)	Jul 24, 2017
Michael Harris; LB	Recruit ratings: Scout: Rivals: 247Sports: ESPN:				
Jamien Sherwood; S	Jensen Beach, Florida	Jensen Beach High School	6 ft 2 in (1.88 m)	195 lb (88 kg)	Jul 25, 2017
Jamien Sherwood; S	Recruit ratings: Scout: Rivals: 247Sports: ESPN:				
Matthew Hill; WR	Snellville, Georgia	Brookwood High School	6 ft 2 in (1.88 m)	185 lb (84 kg)	Aug 17, 2017
Matthew Hill; WR	Recruit ratings: Scout: Rivals: 247Sports: ESPN:				
Asa Martin; RB	Decatur, Alabama	Austin High School	6 ft 0 in (1.83 m)	193 lb (88 kg)	Aug 24, 2017
Asa Martin; RB	Recruit ratings: Scout: Rivals: 247Sports: ESPN:				
Coynis Miller; DT	Birmingham, Alabama	Jackson-Olin High School	6 ft 2 in (1.88 m)	290 lb (130 kg)	Oct 14, 2017
Coynis Miller; DT	Recruit ratings: Scout: Rivals: 247Sports: ESPN:				
Christian Tutt; CB	Thomson, Georgia	Thomson High School	5 ft 11 in (1.80 m)	184 lb (83 kg)	Nov 14, 2017
Christian Tutt; CB	Recruit ratings: Scout: Rivals: 247Sports: ESPN:				
Seth Williams; WR	Cottondale, Alabama	Paul W. Bryant High School	6 ft 3 in (1.91 m)	212 lb (96 kg)	Nov 23, 2017
Seth Williams; WR	Recruit ratings: Scout: Rivals: 247Sports: ESPN:				
Richard Jibunor; LB	Athens, Georgia	Athens Christian School	6 ft 3 in (1.91 m)	206 lb (93 kg)	Nov 23, 2017
Richard Jibunor; LB	Recruit ratings: Scout: Rivals: 247Sports: ESPN:				
Zakoby McClain; LB	Valdosta, Georgia	Valdosta High School	6 ft 0 in (1.83 m)	205 lb (93 kg)	Nov 28, 2017
Zakoby McClain; LB	Recruit ratings: Scout: Rivals: 247Sports: ESPN:				
Arryn Siposs; P	Melbourne, Australia	Prokick Australia	6 ft 2 in (1.88 m)	198 lb (90 kg)	Dec 12, 2017
Arryn Siposs; P	Recruit ratings: Scout: Rivals: 247Sports: ESPN:				
Kayode Oladele; DE	Miami, Florida	Champagnat Catholic School	6 ft 4 in (1.93 m)	235 lb (107 kg)	Dec 17, 2017
Kayode Oladele; DE	Recruit ratings: Scout: Rivals: 247Sports: ESPN:				
Anthony Schwartz; WR	Plantation, Florida	American Heritage School	6 ft 0 in (1.83 m)	172 lb (78 kg)	Jan 4, 2018
Anthony Schwartz; WR	Recruit ratings: Scout: Rivals: 247Sports: ESPN:				
Harold Joiner; RB	Mountain Brook, Alabama	Mountain Brook High School	6 ft 3 in (1.91 m)	218 lb (99 kg)	Jan 14, 2018
Harold Joiner; RB	Recruit ratings: Scout: Rivals: 247Sports: ESPN:				
Roger McCreary; DB	Mobile, Alabama	Williamson High School	5 ft 11 in (1.80 m)	178 lb (81 kg)	Jan 24, 2018
Roger McCreary; DB	Recruit ratings: Scout: Rivals: 247Sports: ESPN:				
Caleb Johnson; LB	Columbus, Georgia	Northside High School	6 ft 3 in (1.91 m)	245 lb (111 kg)	Feb 7, 2018
Caleb Johnson; LB	Recruit ratings: Scout: Rivals: 247Sports: ESPN:				
Overall recruit ranking:
Note: In many cases, Scout, Rivals, 247Sports, On3, and ESPN may conflict in their listings of height and weight.; In these cases, the average was taken. ESPN grades are on a 100-point scale.; Sources: "Auburn Football Commitments". Rivals.; "2018 Team Ranking". Rivals.com.

== Spring game ==
The A-Day spring game was held on Saturday, April 7. Bad weather led to the lowest attendance for A-Day in the Gus Malzahn era as head coach, as only 28,033 showed up. The game was dominated by defense, and only 28 total points were scored between the two teams. Many starters did not play or did not see significant time on the field due to the amount of injuries Auburn had already suffered during the spring. For their performances, C.J. Tolbert was named Offensive MVP, Nick Coe was named Defensive MVP, and Anders Carlson was named Special Teams MVP.

2018 Auburn A-Day Game

Quarter	1	2	3	4	Total
Blue	3	0	0	7	10
Orange	2	13	0	3	18

at Jordan-Hare Stadium • Auburn, Alabama

- Date: April 7, 2018
- Game time: 3:00 p.m.
- Game attendance: 28,033
- TV announcers (SEC Network): Clay Matvick (play-by-play), Jordan Rodgers (analyst), Laura Rutledge (sideline reporter)

== Preseason ==
=== Award watch lists ===
Listed in the order that they were released

Award	Player	Position	Year
Lott Trophy	Deshaun Davis	LB	SR
Chuck Bednarik Award	Javaris Davis	CB	JR
Chuck Bednarik Award	Dontavius Russell	DT	SR
Maxwell Award	Jarrett Stidham	QB	JR
Davey O'Brien Award	Jarrett Stidham	QB	JR
Fred Biletnikoff Award	Ryan Davis	WR	SR
Butkus Award	Deshaun Davis	LB	SR
Bronko Nagurski Trophy	Derrick Brown	DL	JR
Bronko Nagurski Trophy	Marlon Davidson	DL	JR
Outland Trophy	Derrick Brown	DL	JR
Wuerffel Trophy	Derrick Brown	DL	JR
Walter Camp Award	Jarrett Stidham	QB	JR
Johnny Unitas Golden Arm Award	Jarrett Stidham	QB	JR
Manning Award	Jarrett Stidham	QB	JR
Earl Campbell Tyler Rose Award	Jarrett Stidham	QB	JR

=== SEC media poll ===
The SEC media poll was released on July 20, 2018 with the Tigers predicted to finish in second place in the West Division.

=== Preseason All-SEC teams ===
The Tigers had nine players selected to the preseason all-SEC teams.

Offense

2nd team

Jarrett Stidham – QB

Ryan Davis – WR

3rd team

Marquel Harrell – OL

Defense

2nd team

Derrick Brown – DL

Deshaun Davis – LB

Jamel Dean – DB

2nd team

Dontavius Russell – DL

Marlon Davidson – DL

Javaris Davis – DB

== Schedule ==
Date	Time	Opponent	Rank	Site	TV	Result	Attendance
September 1	2:30 p.m.	vs. No. 6 Washington*	No. 9	Mercedes-Benz Stadium; Atlanta, GA (Chick-fil-A Kickoff Game)	ABC	W 21–16	70,103
September 8	6:30 p.m.	Alabama State*	No. 7	Jordan–Hare Stadium; Auburn, AL	SECN	W 63–9	84,806
September 15	2:30 p.m.	No. 12 LSU	No. 7	Jordan–Hare Stadium; Auburn, AL (rivalry)	CBS	L 21–22	86,787
September 22	6:30 p.m.	Arkansas	No. 11	Jordan–Hare Stadium; Auburn, AL	SECN	W 34–3	84,188
September 29	3:00 p.m.	Southern Miss*^{†}	No. 10	Jordan–Hare Stadium; Auburn, AL	SECN	W 24–13	83,792
October 6	6:30 p.m.	at Mississippi State	No. 8	Davis Wade Stadium; Starkville, MS	ESPN2	L 9–23	60,635
October 13	11:00 a.m.	Tennessee	No. 21	Jordan–Hare Stadium; Auburn, AL (rivalry, SEC Nation)	SECN	L 24–30	84,589
October 20	11:00 a.m.	at Ole Miss		Vaught–Hemingway Stadium; Oxford, MS (rivalry)	ESPN	W 31–16	56,885
November 3	11:00 a.m.	No. 20 Texas A&M		Jordan–Hare Stadium; Auburn, AL	ESPN	W 28–24	85,945
November 10	6:00 p.m.	at No. 5 Georgia	No. 24	Sanford Stadium; Athens, GA (Deep South's Oldest Rivalry)	ESPN	L 10–27	92,746
November 17	3:00 p.m.	Liberty*		Jordan–Hare Stadium; Auburn, AL	SECN	W 53–0	81,129
November 24	2:30 p.m.	at No. 1 Alabama		Bryant–Denny Stadium; Tuscaloosa, AL (Iron Bowl, SEC Nation)	CBS	L 21–52	101,821
December 28	12:30 p.m.	vs. Purdue*		Nissan Stadium; Nashville, TN (Music City Bowl)	ESPN	W 63–14	59,024
*Non-conference game; ^{†}Homecoming; Rankings from AP Poll and CFP Rankings after November 5 released prior to game; All times are in Central time

== Game summaries ==
=== Vs. No. 6 Washington ===
2018 Chick-fil-A Kickoff Game
No. 6 Washington Huskies vs. No. 9 Auburn Tigers – Game summary

Quarter	1	2	3	4	Total
No. 6 Washington	3	10	0	3	16
No. 9 Auburn	9	6	0	6	21

at Mercedes-Benz Stadium • Atlanta, Georgia

- Date: September 1, 2018
- Game time: 2:43 p.m.
- Game weather: Indoors
- Game attendance: 70,103
- Referee: John O'Neill
- TV announcers (ABC): Steve Levy (play-by-play), Brian Griese (analyst), Todd McShay (sideline reporter)

Game information

First Quarter

- AUB – Sal Cannella 10 yd pass from Jarrett Stidham (2 pt conversion failed), 11:45 (AUB 6–0)
- AUB – Anders Carlson 32 yd field goal, 5:39 (AUB 9–0)
- WASH – Peyton Henry 31 yd field goal, 2:59 (AUB 9–3)

Second Quarter

- AUB – Anders Carlson 28 yd field goal, 10:35 (AUB 12–3)
- WASH – Peyton Henry 28 yd field goal, 5:57 (AUB 12–6)
- AUB – Anders Carlson 53 yd field goal, 1:23 (AUB 15–6)
- WASH – Quinten Pounds 13 yd pass from Jake Browning (Peyton Henry kick), 0:43 (AUB 15–13)

Fourth Quarter

- WASH – Peyton Henry 30 yd field goal, 14:06 (WASH 16–15)
- AUB – JaTarvious Whitlow 10 yd run (2 pt conversion failed), 6:15 (AUB 21–16)

Top Passers

- WASH – Jake Browning 18–32, 296 yds, 1 TD, 1 INT
- AUB – Jarrett Stidham 26–36, 273 yds, 1 TD

Top Rushers

- WASH – Myles Gaskin 17 rushes, 75 yds
- AUB – Kam Martin 22 rushes, 80 yds

Top Receivers

- WASH – Aaron Fuller 7 receptions, 135 yds
- AUB – Ryan Davis 7 receptions, 52 yds

=== Alabama State ===
Alabama State Hornets at No. 7 Auburn Tigers – Game summary

Quarter	1	2	3	4	Total
Alabama State	0	2	7	0	9
No. 7 Auburn	21	21	7	14	63

at Jordan-Hare Stadium • Auburn, Alabama

- Date: September 8, 2018
- Game time: 6:39 p.m.
- Game weather: Temperature: 87° • Wind: SE 5 mph • Weather: Partly cloudy
- Game attendance: 84,806
- Referee: Hubert Owens
- TV announcers (SEC Network Alternate): Mark Neely (play-by-play), Barrett Jones (analyst), Taylor Davis (sideline reporter)

Game information

First Quarter

- AUB – Jarrett Stidham 6 yd run (Anders Carlson kick), 6:09 (AUB 7–0)
- AUB – Anthony Schwartz 57 yd pass from Jarrett Stidham (Anders Carlson kick), 1:07 (AUB 14–0)
- AUB – Daniel Thomas 29 yd interception return (Anders Carlson kick), 1:00 (AUB 21–0)

Second Quarter

- AUB – Kam Martin 4 yd run (Anders Carlson kick), 11:30 (AUB 28–0)
- AUB – Devan Barrett 10 yd blocked punt return (Anders Carlson kick), 7:42 (AUB 35–0)
- AUB – Anthony Schwartz 23 yd run (Anders Carlson kick), 6:56 (AUB 42–0)
- ASU – Ricky Haley 4 yd safety, 4:43 (AUB 42–2)

Third Quarter

- AUB – Harold Joiner 2 yd run (Ian Shannon kick), 4:52 (AUB 49–2)
- ASU – Joe Williams 29 yd pass from KHA'Darr Davis (Hunter Hanson kick), 0:37 (AUB 49–9)

Fourth Quarter

- AUB – Shaun Shivers 2 yd run (Ian Shannon kick), 8:23 (AUB 56–9)
- AUB – Malik Miller 14 yd run (Ian Shannon kick), 5:10 (AUB 63–9)

Top Passers

- ASU – Darryl Pearson 6–15, 99 yds, 2 INT
- AUB – Jarrett Stidham 6–11, 113 yds, 1 TD

Top Rushers

- ASU – Talesin Farmer 10 rushes, 40 yds
- AUB – JaTarvious Whitlow 14 rushes, 122 yds

Top Receivers

- ASU – Ezra Gray 3 receptions, 16 yds
- AUB – Anthony Schwartz 3 receptions, 67 yds, 1 TD

=== No. 12 LSU ===
No. 12 LSU Tigers at No. 7 Auburn Tigers – Game summary

Quarter	1	2	3	4	Total
No. 12 LSU	7	3	3	9	22
No. 7 Auburn	0	14	7	0	21

at Jordan-Hare Stadium • Auburn, Alabama

- Date: September 15, 2018
- Game time: 2:39 p.m.
- Game weather: Temperature: 93° • Wind: N 10 mph • Weather: Partly Cloudy
- Game attendance: 86,787
- Referee: John McDaid
- TV announcers (CBS): Brad Nessler (play-by-play), Gary Danielson (analyst), Jamie Erdahl (sideline reporter)

Game information

First Quarter

- LSU – Clyde Edwards-Helaire 1 yd run (Cole Tracy kick), 9:59 (LSU 7–0)

Second Quarter

- LSU – Cole Tracy 33 yd field goal, 8:37 (LSU 10–0)
- AUB – JaTarvious Whitlow 7 yd run (Anders Carlson kick), 5:06 (LSU 10–7)
- AUB – Shaun Shivers 7 yd run (Anders Carlson kick), 1:31 (AUB 14–10)

Third Quarter

- AUB – Darius Slayton 4 yd pass from Jarrett Stidham (Anders Carlson kick), 10:38 (AUB 21–10)
- LSU – Cole Tracy 27 yd field goal, 3:58 (AUB 21–13)

Fourth Quarter

- LSU – Derrick Dillon 71 yd pass from Joe Burrow (2 pt conversion failed), 8:18 (AUB 21–19)
- LSU – Cole Tracy 42 yd field goal, 0:00 (LSU 22–21)

Top Passers

- LSU – Joe Burrow 15–34, 249 yds, 1 TD
- AUB – Jarrett Stidham 16–28, 198 yds, 1 TD, 2 INT

Top Rushers

- LSU – Nick Brossette 19 rushes, 69 yds
- AUB – JaTarvious Whitlow 22 rushes, 104 yds, 1 TD

Top Receivers

- LSU – Justin Jefferson 5 receptions, 97 yds
- AUB – Anthony Schwartz 2 receptions, 37 yds

=== Arkansas ===
Arkansas Razorbacks at No. 9 Auburn Tigers – Game summary

Quarter	1	2	3	4	Total
Arkansas	0	0	3	0	3
No. 9 Auburn	10	7	7	10	34

at Jordan-Hare Stadium • Auburn, Alabama

- Date: September 22, 2018
- Game time: 6:39 p.m.
- Game weather: Temperature: 85° • Wind: SE 9 mph • Weather: Partly cloudy
- Game attendance: 84,188
- Referee: Ken Williamson
- TV announcers (SEC Network): Tom Hart (play-by-play), Jordan Rodgers (analyst), Cole Cubelic (sideline reporter)

Game information

First Quarter

- AUB – JaTarvious Whitlow 5 yd run (Anders Carlson kick), 10:36 (AUB 7–0)
- AUB – Anders Carlson 18 yd field goal, 0:21 (AUB 10–0)

Second Quarter

- AUB – Jarrett Stidham 4 yd run (Anders Carlson kick), 0:49 (AUB 17–0)

Third Quarter

- ARK – Connor Limpert 29 yd field goal, 9:19 (AUB 17–3)
- AUB – Noah Igbinoghene 96 yd kickoff return (Anders Carlson kick), 9:05 (AUB 24–3)

Fourth Quarter

- AUB – JaTarvious Whitlow 15 yd run (Anders Carlson kick), 8:18 (AUB 31–3)
- AUB – Anders Carlson 43 yd field goal, 3:15 (AUB 34–3)

Top Passers

- ARK – Ty Storey 13–31, 141 yds, 1 INT
- AUB – Jarrett Stidham 15–22, 134 yds

Top Rushers

- ARK – Rakeem Boyd 8 rushes, 66 yds
- AUB – JaTarvious Whitlow 13 rushes, 49 yds, 2 TD

Top Receivers

- ARK – Rakeem Boyd 2 receptions, 39 yds
- AUB – Ryan Davis 6 receptions, 40 yds

=== Southern Miss ===
Southern Miss Golden Eagles at No. 10 Auburn Tigers – Game summary

Quarter	1	2	3	4	Total
Southern Miss	0	3	3	7	13
No. 10 Auburn	7	7	7	3	24

at Jordan-Hare Stadium • Auburn, Alabama

- Date: September 29, 2018
- Game time: 3:01 p.m.
- Game weather: Temperature: 85° • Wind: 3 mph NW • Weather: Sunny
- Game attendance: 83,792
- Referee: David Smith
- TV announcers (SEC Network): Dave Neal (play-by-play), D.J. Shockley (analyst), Dawn Davenport (sideline reporter)

Game information

First Quarter

- AUB – Seth Williams 46 yd pass from Jarrett Stidham (Anders Carlson kick), 3:39 (AUB 7–0)

Second Quarter

- USM – Parker Shaunfield 44 yd field goal, 12:51 (AUB 7–3)
- AUB – Anthony Schwartz 6 yd run (Anders Carlson kick), 6:43 (AUB 14–3)

Third Quarter

- USM – Parker Shaunfield 51 yd field goal, 7:20 (AUB 14–6)
- AUB – Chandler Cox 2 yd pass from Jarrett Stidham (Anders Carlson kick), 5:39 (AUB 21–6)

Fourth Quarter

- USM – Quez Watkins 12 yd pass from Jack Abraham (Parker Shaunfield kick), 13:47 (AUB 21–13)
- AUB – Anders Carlson 23 yd field goal, 2:00 (AUB 24–13)

Top Passers

- USM – Jack Abraham 30–44, 215 yds, 1 TD, 2 INT
- AUB – Jarrett Stidham 19–33, 245 yds, 2 TD

Top Rushers

- USM – Trivensky Mosley 4 rushes, 25 yds
- AUB – Kam Martin 24 rushes, 90 yds

Top Receivers

- USM – Jaylond Adams 8 receptions, 47 yds
- AUB – Darius Slayton 5 receptions, 91 yds

=== At Mississippi State ===
No. 8 Auburn Tigers at Mississippi State Bulldogs – Game summary

Quarter	1	2	3	4	Total
No. 8 Auburn	3	0	3	3	9
Mississippi State	3	10	3	7	23

at Davis Wade Stadium • Starkville, Mississippi

- Date: October 6, 2018
- Game time: 6:35 p.m.
- Game weather: Temperature: 81° • Wind: SE 3 mph • Weather: Clear skies
- Game attendance: 60,635
- Referee: James Carter
- TV announcers (ESPN2): Mark Jones (play-by-play), Dusty Dvoracek (analyst), Molly McGrath (sideline reporter)

Game information

First Quarter

- AUB – Anders Carlson 47 yd field goal, 7:30 (AUB 3–0)
- MSU – Jace Christmann 25 yd field goal, 2:37 (TIE 3–3)

Second Quarter

- MSU – Jace Christmann 47 yd field goal, 10:13 (MSU 6–3)
- MSU – Nick Fitzgerald 1 yd run (Jace Christmann kick), 0:00 (MSU 13–3)

Third Quarter

- MSU – Jace Christmann 32 yd field goal, 6:55 (MSU 16–3)
- AUB – Anders Carlson 38 yd field goal, 5:45 (MSU 16–6)

Fourth Quarter

- AUB – Anders Carlson 24 yd field goal, 11:24 (MSU 16–9)
- MSU – Nick Fitzgerald 21 yd run (Jace Christmann kick), 2:02 (MSU 23–9)

Top Passers

- AUB – Jarrett Stidham 19–38, 214 yds
- MSU – Nick Fitzgerald 9–17, 69 yds, 1 INT

Top Rushers

- AUB – JaTarvious Whitlow 8 rushes, 88 yds
- MSU – Nick Fitzgerald 28 rushes, 195 yds

Top Receivers

- AUB – Ryan Davis 8 receptions, 91 yds
- MSU – Farrod Green 2 receptions, 23 yds

=== Tennessee ===
Tennessee Volunteers at No. 21 Auburn Tigers – Game summary

Quarter	1	2	3	4	Total
Tennessee	3	10	14	3	30
No. 21 Auburn	10	7	0	7	24

at Jordan-Hare Stadium • Auburn, Alabama

- Date: October 13, 2018
- Game time: 11:01 a.m.
- Game weather: Temperature: 70° • Wind: N 6 mph • Weather: Sunny
- Game attendance: 84,589
- Referee: Matt Austin
- TV announcers (SEC Network): Dave Neal (play-by-play), D.J. Shockley (analyst), Dawn Davenport (sideline reporter)

Game information

First Quarter

- AUB – Chandler Cox 1 yd run (Anders Carlson kick), 9:44 (AUB 7–0)
- TENN – Brent Cimaglia 42 yd field goal, 5:24 (AUB 7–3)
- AUB – Anders Carlson 20 yd field goal, 2:20 (AUB 10–3)

Second Quarter

- TENN – Ty Chandler 42 yd pass from Jarrett Guarantano (Brent Cimaglia kick), 10:44 (TIE 10–10)
- AUB – Anthony Schwartz 76 yd pass from Jarrett Stidham (Anders Carlson kick), 3:26 (AUB 17–10)
- TENN – Brent Cimaglia 45 yd field goal, 0:07 (AUB 17–13)

Third Quarter

- TENN – Jauan Jennings 25 yd pass from Jarrett Guarantano (Brent Cimaglia kick), 3:25 (TENN 20–17)
- TENN – Alontae Taylor 8 yd fumble recovery (Brent Cimaglia kick), 2:34 (TENN 27–17)

Fourth Quarter

- TENN – Brent Cimaglia 20 yd field goal, 9:04 (TENN 30–17)
- AUB – Seth Williams 14 yd pass from Jarrett Stidham (Anders Carlson kick), 0:37 (TENN 30–24)

Top Passers

- TENN – Jarrett Guarantano 21–32, 328 yds, 2 TD
- AUB – Jarrett Stidham 28–45, 322 yds, 2 TD, 2 INT

Top Rushers

- TENN – Ty Chandler 16 rushes, 50 yds
- AUB – Anthony Schwartz 3 rushes, 44 yds

Top Receivers

- TENN – Jauan Jennings 5 receptions, 71 yds, 1 TD
- AUB – Ryan Davis 7 receptions, 57 yds

=== At Ole Miss ===
Auburn Tigers at Ole Miss Rebels – Game summary

Quarter	1	2	3	4	Total
Auburn	7	3	21	0	31
Ole Miss	3	3	3	7	16

at Vaught-Hemmingway Stadium • Oxford, Mississippi

- Date: October 20, 2018
- Game time: 11:02 a.m.
- Game weather: Temperature: 59° • Wind: • Weather: Cloudy
- Game attendance: 56,885
- Referee: David Smith
- TV announcers (ESPN): Adam Amin (play-by-play), Rod Gilmore (analyst), Quint Kessenich (sideline reporter)

Game information

First Quarter

- AUB – JaTarvious Whitlow 3 yd pass from Jarrett Stidham (Anders Carlson kick), 8:36 (AUB 7–0)
- MISS – Luke Logan 36 yd field goal, 5:49 (AUB 7–3)

Second Quarter

- MISS – Luke Logan 37 yd field goal, 9:16 (AUB 7–6)
- AUB – Anders Carlson 28 yd field goal, 4:18 (AUB 10–6)

Third Quarter

- AUB – Malik Miller 1 yd run (Anders Carlson kick), 12:07 (AUB 17–6)
- MISS – Luke Logan 35 yd field goal, 8:30 (AUB 17–9)
- AUB – Anthony Schwartz 0 yd fumble recovery (Anders Carlson kick), 6:53 (AUB 24–9)
- AUB – Malik Miller 2 yd run (Anders Carlson kick), 3:00 (AUB 31–9)

Fourth Quarter

- MISS – A. J. Brown 12 yd pass from Jordan Ta'amu (Luke Logan kick), 2:24 (AUB 31–16)

Top Passers

- AUB – Jarrett Stidham 13–22, 215 yds, 1 TD
- MISS – Jordan Ta'amu 27–46, 324 yds, 1 TD

Top Rushers

- AUB – JaTarvious Whitlow 19 rushes, 170 yds
- MISS – Scottie Phillips 17 rushes, 59 yds

Top Receivers

- AUB – JaTarvious Whitlow 4 receptions, 38 yds, 1 TD
- MISS – A. J. Brown 10 receptions, 155 yds, 1 TD

=== No. 25 Texas A&M ===
No. 25 Texas A&M Aggies at Auburn Tigers – Game summary

Quarter	1	2	3	4	Total
No. 25 Texas A&M	3	14	7	0	24
Auburn	7	7	0	14	28

at Jordan-Hare Stadium • Auburn, Alabama

- Date: November 3, 2018
- Game time: 11:03 a.m.
- Game weather: Temperature: 53° • Wind: SE 3 mph • Weather: Sunny
- Game attendance: 85,945
- Referee: Ken Williamson
- TV announcers (ESPN): Bob Wischusen (play-by-play), Brock Huard (analyst), Allison Williams (sideline reporter)

Game information

First Quarter

- TA&M – Seth Small 35 yd field goal, 7:10 (TA&M 3–0)
- AUB – Sal Canella 20 yd pass from Ryan Davis (Anders Carlson kick), 1:37 (AUB 7–3)

Second Quarter

- TA&M – Trayveon Williams 38 yd run (Seth Small kick), 14:19 (TA&M 14–10)
- AUB – Seth Williams 11 yd pass from Jarrett Stidham (Anders Carlson kick), 4:03 (AUB 14–10)
- TA&M – Trayveon Williams 14 yd pass from Kellen Mond (Seth Small kick), 1:09 (TA&M 17–14)

Third Quarter

- TA&M – Trayveon Williams 1 yd run (Seth Small kick), 10:27 (TA&M 24–14)

Fourth Quarter

- AUB – Chandler Cox 1 yd run (Anders Carlson kick), 5:14 (TA&M 24–21)
- AUB – Seth Williams 11 yd pass from Jarrett Stidham (Anders Carlson kick), 1:41 (AUB 28–24)

Top Passers

- TA&M – Kellen Mond 16–32, 220 yds, 1 TD, 1 INT
- AUB – Jarrett Stidham 18–29, 239 yds, 2 TD

Top Rushers

- TA&M – Trayveon Williams 17 rushes, 107 yds, 2 TD
- AUB – JaTarvious Whitlow 8 rushes, 16 yds

Top Receivers

- TA&M – Trayveon Williams 5 receptions, 71 yds, 1 TD
- AUB – Darius Slayton 8 receptions, 107 yds

=== At No. 5 Georgia ===
Auburn Tigers at No. 5 Georgia Bulldogs – Game summary

Quarter	1	2	3	4	Total
Auburn	7	3	0	0	10
No. 5 Georgia	3	17	0	7	27

at Sanford Stadium • Athens, Georgia

- Date: November 10, 2018
- Game time: 6:10 p.m.
- Game weather: Temperature: 45° • Wind: Calm • Weather: Clear
- Game attendance: 92,746
- Referee: John McDaid
- TV announcers (ESPN): Sean McDonough (play-by-play), Todd Blackledge (analyst), Holly Rowe (sideline reporter)

Game information

First Quarter

- UGA – Rodrigo Blankenship 25 yd field goal, 7:01 (UGA 3–0)
- AUB – John Shenker 9 yd pass from JaTarvious Whitlow (Anders Carlson kick), 4:28 (AUB 7–3)

Second Quarter

- UGA – Rodrigo Blankenship 20 yd field goal, 11:13 (AUB 7–6)
- AUB – Anders Carlson 27 yd field goal, 7:46 (AUB 10–6)
- UGA – Tyler Simmons 14 yd pass from Jake Fromm (Rodrigo Blankenship kick), 2:47 (UGA 13–10)
- UGA – Terry Godwin 38 yd pass from Jake Fromm (Rodrigo Blankenship kick), 0:21 (UGA 20–10)

Fourth Quarter

- UGA – D'Andre Swift 77 yd run (Rodrigo Blankenship kick), 13:53 (UGA 27–10)

Top Passers

- AUB – Jarrett Stidham 24–36, 163 yds
- UGA – Jake Fromm 13–20, 193 yds, 2 TD, 1 INT

Top Rushers

- AUB – Shaun Shivers 4 rushes, 43 yds
- UGA – D'Andre Swift 17 rushes, 186 yds, 1 TD

Top Receivers

- AUB – Ryan Davis 13 receptions, 72 yds
- UGA – Terry Godwin 3 receptions, 84 yds, 1 TD

=== Liberty ===
Liberty Flames at Auburn Tigers – Game summary

Quarter	1	2	3	4	Total
Liberty	0	0	0	0	0
Auburn	15	17	21	0	53

at Jordan-Hare Stadium • Auburn, Alabama

- Date: November 17, 2018
- Game time: 3:01 p.m.
- Game weather: Temperature: 66° • Wind: NW 2 mph • Weather: Sunny
- Game attendance: 81,129
- Referee: Jason Autrey
- TV announcers (SEC Network Alternate): Richard Cross (play-by-play), Hutson Mason (analyst), Taylor Davis (sideline reporter)

Game information

First Quarter

- AUB – Anders Carlson 53 yd field goal, 7:40 (AUB 3–0)
- AUB – Darrell Williams 26 yd interception return (Anders Carlson kick), 7:29 (AUB 10–0)
- AUB – Jordan Peters 27 yd blocked punt for safety, 6:45 (AUB 12–0)
- AUB – Anders Carlson 20 yd field goal, 0:12 (AUB 15–0)

Second Quarter

- AUB – Jarrett Stidham 1 yd run (Anders Carlson kick), 11:01 (AUB 22–0)
- AUB – Anders Carlson 49 yd field goal, 3:04 (AUB 25–0)
- AUB – Sal Cannella 22 yd pass from Jarrett Stidham (Anders Carlson kick), 1:03 (AUB 32–0)

Third Quarter

- AUB – Seth Williams 45 yd pass from Jarrett Stidham (Anders Carlson kick), 13:19 (AUB 39–0)
- AUB – Shaun Shivers 25 yd run (Ian Shannon kick), 5:46 (AUB 46–0)
- AUB – Malik Willis 16 yd run (Ian Shannon kick), 0:13 (AUB 53–0)

Top Passers

- LIB – Stephen Calvert 9–28, 79 yds, 2 INT
- AUB – Jarrett Stidham 12–18, 178 yds, 2 TD

Top Rushers

- LIB – Frankie Hickson 10 rushes, 45 yds
- AUB – Kam Martin 17 rushes, 116 yds

Top Receivers

- LIB – B. J. Farrow 2 receptions, 27 yds
- AUB – Seth Williams 5 receptions, 109 yds, 1 TD

=== At No. 1 Alabama ===
Auburn Tigers at No. 1 Alabama Crimson Tide – Game summary

Quarter	1	2	3	4	Total
Auburn	7	7	7	0	21
No. 1 Alabama	7	10	21	14	52

at Bryant-Denny Stadium • Tuscaloosa, Alabama

- Date: November 24, 2018
- Game time: 2:39 p.m.
- Game attendance: 101,821
- Referee: Hubert Owens
- TV announcers (CBS): Brad Nessler (play-by-play), Gary Danielson (analyst), Jamie Erdahl (sideline reporter)

Game information

First Quarter

- ALA – Tua Tagovailoa 7 yd run (Joseph Bulovas kick), 6:38 (ALA 7–0)
- AUB – Anthony Schwartz 9 yd run (Anders Carlson kick), 2:37 (Tied 7–7)

Second Quarter

- ALA – Henry Ruggs 4 yd pass from Tua Tagovailoa (Joseph Bulovas kick), 14:15 (ALA 14–7)
- ALA – Joseph Bulovas 30 yd field goal, 7:46 (ALA 17–7)
- AUB – Malik Miller 23 yd pass from Ryan Davis (Anders Carlson kick), 2:47 (ALA 17–14)

Third Quarter

- ALA – Jerry Jeudy 46 yd pass from Tua Tagovailoa (Joseph Bulovas kick), 12:57 (ALA 24–14)
- ALA – Josh Jacobs 33 yd pass from Tua Tagovailoa (Joseph Bulovas kick), 9:49 (ALA 31–14)
- AUB – Darius Slayton 52 yd pass from Jarrett Stidham (Anders Carlson kick), 3:31 (ALA 31–21)
- ALA – DeVonta Smith 40 yd pass from Tua Tagovailoa (Joseph Bulovas kick), 2:22 (ALA 38–21)

Fourth Quarter

- ALA – Henry Ruggs 22 yd pass from Tua Tagovailoa (Joseph Bulovas kick), 14:29 (ALA 45–21)
- ALA – Jaylen Waddle 52 yd pass from Jalen Hurts (Joseph Bulovas kick), 9:29 (ALA 52–21)

Top Passers

- AUB – Jarrett Stidham 24–36, 163 yds
- UGA – Jake Fromm 13–20, 193 yds, 2 TD, 1 INT

Top Rushers

- AUB – Shaun Shivers 4 rushes, 43 yds
- UGA – D'Andre Swift 17 rushes, 186 yds, 1 TD

Top Receivers

- AUB – Ryan Davis 13 receptions, 72 yds
- UGA – Terry Godwin 3 receptions, 84 yds, 1 TD

=== Vs. Purdue ===
2018 Music City Bowl
Purdue Boilermakers vs. Auburn Tigers – Game summary

Quarter	1	2	3	4	Total
Purdue	7	0	7	0	14
Auburn	28	28	7	0	63

at Nissan Stadium • Nashville, Tennessee

- Date: December 28, 2018
- Game time: 12:33 p.m.
- Game attendance: 59,024
- Referee: Brad Van Vark
- TV announcers (ESPN): Anish Shroff (play-by-play), Ahmad Brooks (analyst), Roddy Jones (sideline reporter)

== Rankings ==
Ranking movements Legend: ██ Increase in ranking ██ Decrease in ranking — = Not ranked RV = Received votes
	Week															
Poll	Pre	1	2	3	4	5	6	7	8	9	10	11	12	13	14	Final
AP	9	7	7	9	10	8	21	—	RV	RV	RV	RV	RV	—	—	RV
Coaches	10	7	7	11	10	9	21	RV	RV	RV	RV	RV	RV	—	—	RV
CFP	Not released									—	24	—	—	—	—	Not released

== Players drafted into the NFL ==
Auburn had six players selected in the 2019 NFL draft.

Round	Pick	Player	Position	NFL Club
3	94	Jamel Dean	CB	Tampa Bay Buccaneers
4	133	Jarrett Stidham	QB	New England Patriots
5	171	Darius Slayton	WR	New York Giants
6	210	Deshaun Davis	LB	Cincinnati Bengals
7	233	Chandler Cox	FB	Miami Dolphins
7	235	Dontavius Russell	DT	Jacksonville Jaguars
