= Spencer High School =

Spencer High School may refer to:

- William H. Spencer High School — Columbus, Georgia
- Spencer High School (Iowa) — Spencer, Iowa
- Spencer High School (Wisconsin) — Spencer, Wisconsin
- Spencer County High School — Taylorsville, Kentucky
- South Spencer High School — Rockport, Indiana
- Spencer/Naper High School — Spencer, Nebraska
- Star Spencer High School — Spencer, Oklahoma
- Spencer-Van Etten High School — Spencer, New York
