= Candace Vogler =

American philosopher

Candace A. Vogler is Professor of Philosophy at the University of Chicago, and a specialist in moral philosophy, philosophy of action, and G. E. M. Anscombe.

== Education and career ==
Vogler received her PhD in philosophy from the University of Pittsburgh in 1995, and has taught at the University of Chicago since 1994.

From 2004 to 2007 she was Co-Director of the Master of Arts Program in the Humanities at the University of Chicago.

She also sits on the Editorial Committee of the scholarly journal Public Culture and has co-edited two of its special issues, Critical Limits of Embodiment with Carol Breckenridge in 2002 and Violence and Redemption with Patchen Markell in 2003. Currently, she is editing the forthcoming Oxford Companion to John Stuart Mill.

She is a convert to the Roman Catholic Church.

In 2015, Vogler began, with co-Principal Investigator Jennifer A. Frey, the project "Virtue, Happiness, & the Meaning of Life", made possible by a $2.5-million grant from the John Templeton Foundation.

On November 11, 2019, Comment magazine published a lengthy, and very personal article by Prof. Vogler entitled "A Spiritual Autobiography," which constitutes some of her most extended autobiographical reflections in print.

She was awarded the prestigious Barry Prize for Distinguished Intellectual Achievement by the American Academy of Sciences and Letters in 2023.

== Philosophical work ==
Vogler's specific fields of interest are ethics, feminism, action theory, and social and political philosophy, as well as sexuality and gender studies. She has special interest in English literature and literary theory, and did doctoral work in cultural studies with emphasis in 20th century French thought. Indeed, in 2000, she became one of two philosophers invited to speak at the English Institute in the seven decades of its history, the other being Stanley Cavell. She works on Karl Marx, Thomas Aquinas, John Stuart Mill, Jean-Jacques Rousseau, and Elizabeth Anscombe. She has emphasized the importance of a liberal arts education at the undergraduate level in various lectures, believing it extremely important that students learn critical thinking skills in college.

She is the author of John Stuart Mill's Deliberative Landscape: An Essay in Moral Psychology, published by Routledge in 2001, and Reasonably Vicious, published by Harvard University Press in 2002.

== General and cited references ==
- Virtue, Happiness, & the Meaning of Life
- Candace Vogler's webpage at The University of Chicago Department of Philosophy website
- Books by Candace Vogler
- Depauw University Colloquium on Liberal Education
