= Derrick Barnes (American football) =

American football player (born 1999)

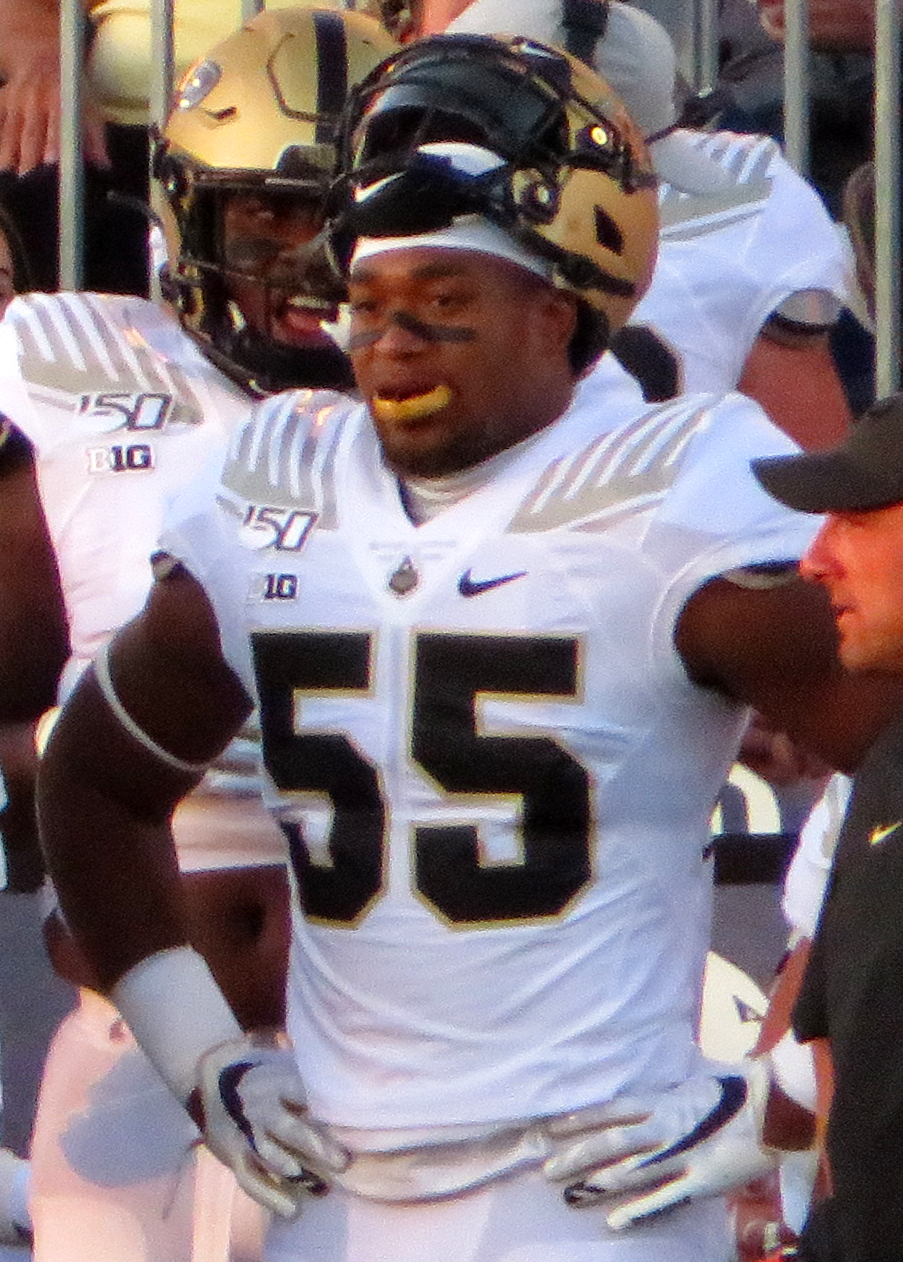
- Barnes with Purdue in 2019

No. 55 – Detroit Lions
- Position: Linebacker
- Roster status: Active

Personal information
- Born: May 29, 1999 (age 27); Covington, Kentucky, U.S.
- Listed height: 6 ft 0 in (1.83 m)
- Listed weight: 240 lb (109 kg)

Career information
- High school: Holy Cross (Covington)
- College: Purdue (2017–2020)
- NFL draft: 2021: 4th round, 113th overall pick

Career history
- Detroit Lions (2021–present)

Awards and highlights
- Second-team All-Big Ten (2020)

Career NFL statistics as of Week 8, 2026
- Total tackles: 317
- Sacks: 11
- Forced fumbles: 1
- Pass deflections: 9
- Interceptions: 2
- Stats at Pro Football Reference

Derrick Danta Barnes Jr. (born May 29, 1999) is an American professional football linebacker for the Detroit Lions of the National Football League (NFL). He played college football for the Purdue Boilermakers and was selected by the Lions in the fourth round of the 2021 NFL draft.

== Early life ==
Barnes grew up in Covington, Kentucky and attended Holy Cross High School, where he played basketball and ran track in addition to playing linebacker and running back on the football team, coached by former Cincinnati Bengal, Bruce Kozerski. As a senior, he was named first-team All-State and the Class 2-A, District Six Player of the Year after leading the team with 126 tackles on defense and rushing for 1,567 yards and 22 touchdowns on 150 carries on offense. Barnes originally committed to play college football at Toledo going into his senior year, but changed his commitment to Purdue after receiving an offer from new head coach Jeff Brohm.

== College career ==
Barnes played in 12 games with two starts during his freshman season. He became a starter as a sophomore and finished the season with 92 tackles with 8 tackles for loss and 3 sacks. After the regular season, he was moved to the defensive end position going into 2018 Music City Bowl. He stayed as a pass rusher during his junior season and finished the year tied for the second most sacks on the team with 7.5 along with 11.0 tackles for loss. As a senior, Barnes returned to the middle linebacker position and led the Boilermakers with 54 total tackles and was second on the team in tackles for loss with 5.5 and was named second-team All-Big Ten.

== Professional career ==
Pre-draft measurables
Height	Weight	Arm length	Hand span	Wingspan	40-yard dash	10-yard split	20-yard split	20-yard shuttle	Vertical jump	Broad jump	Bench press
6 ft 0 3/8 in (1.84 m)	238 lb (108 kg)	33 3/8 in (0.85 m)	9 3/4 in (0.25 m)	6 ft 9 3/8 in (2.07 m)	4.57 s	1.70 s	2.58 s	4.32 s	37.0 in (0.94 m)	9 ft 11 in (3.02 m)	29 reps
All values from Pro Day

Barnes was drafted in the fourth round, 113th overall, by the Detroit Lions in the 2021 NFL draft. He signed his four-year rookie contract with Detroit on June 17, 2021.

On January 21, 2024, during the NFC divisional round game against the Tampa Bay Buccaneers, Barnes intercepted a pass thrown by Baker Mayfield in the final two minutes of the game, securing the Lions' victory and sending them to the NFC Championship Game for the first time since 1991.

Barnes started 3 games for Detroit in the 2024 season, recording 10 combined tackles. On September 24, 2024, he was placed on injured reserve with a knee injury. On January 7, 2025, head coach Dan Campbell announced that Barnes would miss the remainder of the season.

On March 7, 2025, Barnes signed a three-year, $25.5 million contract extension with the Lions.

== NFL career statistics ==
Legend
	Led the league
**Bold**	Career high

=== Regular season ===
Year	Team	Games		Tackles						Interceptions						Fumbles				
Year	Team	GP	GS	Cmb	Solo	Ast	Sck	TFL	Sfty	Int	Yds	Avg	Lng	TD	PD	FF	Fum	FR	Yds	TD
2021	DET	17	6	67	**42**	25	2.0	4	0	0	0	0.0	0	0	2	0	0	0	0	0
2022	DET	15	4	47	27	20	1.0	3	0	0	0	0.0	0	0	1	0	0	0	0	0
2023	DET	16	13	**81**	**42**	**39**	1.0	5	0	0	0	0.0	0	0	0	**1**	0	0	0	0
2024	DET	3	3	10	8	2	0.0	0	0	0	0	0.0	0	0	1	0	0	0	0	0
2025	DET	17	17	78	40	38	**4.0**	**6**	**1**	**1**	**23**	**23.0**	**23**	0	**3**	0	0	0	0	0
Career		68	43	283	159	124	8.0	18	1	1	23	23.0	23	0	7	1	0	0	0	0

=== Postseason ===
Year	Team	Games		Tackles						Interceptions						Fumbles				
Year	Team	GP	GS	Cmb	Solo	Ast	Sck	TFL	Sfty	Int	Yds	Avg	Lng	TD	PD	FF	Fum	FR	Yds	TD
2023	DET	3	3	6	4	2	0.0	0	0	1	0	0.0	0	0	1	0	0	0	0	0
Career		3	3	6	4	2	0.0	0	0	1	0	0.0	0	0	1	0	0	0	0	0

== Personal life ==
During the 11th Annual NFL Honors on February 10, 2022, NFL veteran and 2021 Walter Payton NFL Man of the Year Award winner Andrew Whitworth told a story about himself and Barnes reuniting after a 2021 Week 7 game between the Los Angeles Rams and Lions; Barnes approached Whitworth after the game to thank him for his earlier mentorship through Boys & Girls Clubs of Greater Cincinnati.
