= Markelle =

Markelle is a given name. Notable people with the name include:

- Markelle Fultz (born 1998), American basketball player
- Markelle Martin (born 1990), American football player

== See also ==
- Markel (name)
- Markell, given name and surname
