= Markel (name) =

Markel is a given name and surname. Notable people with the name include:

== Given name ==
- Markel Bell (born 2004), American football player
- Markel Bergara, Basque footballer currently playing for Getafe
- Markel Brown (born 1992), American basketball player in the Israeli Basketball Premier League
- Markel Irizar, Basque professional cyclist
- Markel Olano, Basque politician
- Markel Robles, Basque footballer
- Markel Susaeta, Basque footballer currently playing for Athletic Bilbao

== Surname ==
- Dan Markel (1972–2014), Canadian-born attorney, law professor, and author
- Gregory Markel, American musician
- Howard Markel, American medical historian
- Lester Markel, American journalist and editor
- Parker Markel, American baseball player

== See also ==
- Markell, given name and surname
- Markelle, given name
- Markle (disambiguation)
