= Jontavius Morris =

American football player and coach (born 1993)

Louisville Cardinals
- Title: defensive tackles coach

Personal information
- Born: December 16, 1993 (age 32); Albany, Georgia, U.S.
- Listed height: 6 ft 1 in (1.85 m)
- Listed weight: 309 lb (140 kg)

Career information
- High school: Albany (Albany, Georgia)
- College: Western Kentucky
- NFL draft: 2016: undrafted

Career history

Playing
- Tampa Bay Buccaneers (2016)

Coaching
- Purdue (2018–present) Graduate assistant

Jontavius Morris (born December 16, 1993) is an American football coach and former defensive tackle. He is the defensive tackles coach at Louisville. Morris played college football at the University of Alabama at Birmingham for coaches Garrick McGee and Bill Clark from 2012 to 2014 and at Western Kentucky University for coach Jeff Brohm and played in the National Football League (NFL) in 2012.

== College career ==
Morris played college football for three years at the University of Alabama in Birmingham until the school suspended its football program in 2014. He transferred to Western Kentucky in 2015.

== Professional career ==
=== Pre-draft ===
Pre-draft measurables
Height	Weight	40-yard dash	10-yard split	20-yard split	20-yard shuttle	Three-cone drill	Vertical jump	Broad jump	Bench press
6 ft 1 in (1.85 m)	309 lb (140 kg)	5.27 s	1.94 s	3.03 s	4.85 s	7.71 s	24 in (0.61 m)	8 ft 0 in (2.44 m)	23 reps
All values from WKU Pro Day

=== Tampa Bay Buccaneers ===
On May 1, 2016, Morris was signed by the Tampa Bay Buccaneers as an undrafted free agent.

== Coaching career ==
In 2018, Morris became a graduate assistant at Purdue University.
