= Rondale Moore =

American football player (2000–2026)

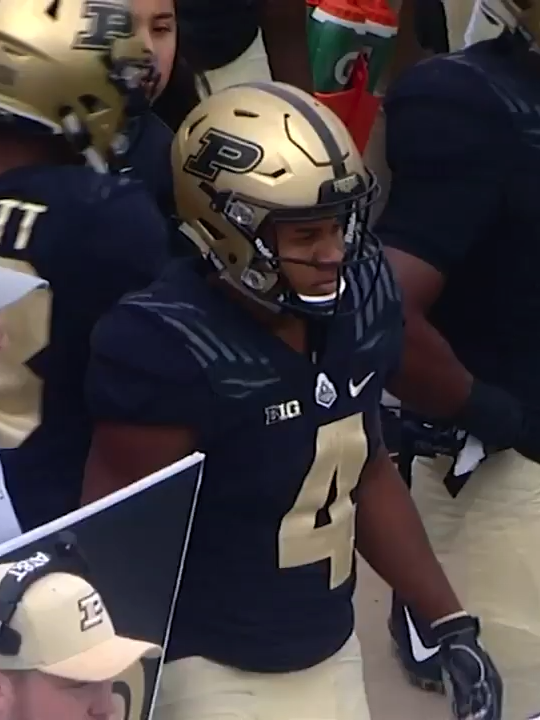
- Moore with the Purdue Boilermakers in 2018

No. 4, 14, 9
- Position: Wide receiver

Personal information
- Born: June 9, 2000; New Albany, Indiana, U.S.
- Died: February 21, 2026 (aged 25); New Albany, Indiana, U.S.
- Listed height: 5 ft 7 in (1.70 m)
- Listed weight: 181 lb (82 kg)

Career information
- High school: Trinity (Louisville, Kentucky)
- College: Purdue (2018–2020)
- NFL draft: 2021: 2nd round, 49th overall pick

Career history
- Arizona Cardinals (2021–2023); Atlanta Falcons (2024); Minnesota Vikings (2025)

Awards and highlights
- Paul Hornung Award (2018); Paul Warfield Trophy (2018); Consensus All-American (2018); Big Ten Receiver of the Year (2018); Big Ten Freshman of the Year (2018); First-team All-Big Ten (2018)

Career NFL statistics
- Receptions: 135
- Receiving yards: 1,201
- Receiving touchdowns: 3
- Stats at Pro Football Reference

Rondale DaSean Moore (June 9, 2000 – February 21, 2026) was an American professional football player who was a wide receiver in the National Football League (NFL). He played college football for the Purdue Boilermakers, earning consensus All-American honors as a freshman. Moore was selected by the Arizona Cardinals in the second round (49th overall) of the 2021 NFL draft and spent three seasons with the team. He also played for the Atlanta Falcons and the Minnesota Vikings, though he did not appear in any regular-season games due to preseason injuries.

== Early life ==
Moore was born in New Albany, Indiana, on June 9, 2000. He grew up on the same block as former NBA player Romeo Langford and the two played basketball together until their sophomore year of high school. He attended New Albany High School where he was part of the 2016 4A Indiana State basketball championship team with Langford. He then transferred to Trinity High School, where he was a four-star football recruit and he helped lead the football team to a 15–0 season. This team went on to win the Kentucky 6A state championship in 2017. In June 2017, he committed to play at the University of Texas at Austin, but later chose to attend Purdue University.

College recruiting
Name	Hometown	School	Height	Weight	40^{‡}	Commit date
Rondale Moore; WR	Louisville, Kentucky	Trinity High School	5 ft 7 in (1.70 m)	193 lb (88 kg)	4.33	Jan 6, 2018
Rondale Moore; WR	Recruit ratings: Scout: Rivals: 247Sports: ESPN:					
Overall recruit ranking: Rivals: 100 (WR), 4 (KY) 247Sports: 41 (WR), 1 (KY) ESPN: 282 (OVR), 45 (WR), 2 (KY)
‡ Refers to 40-yard dash; Note: In many cases, Scout, Rivals, 247Sports, On3, and ESPN may conflict in their listings of height, weight and 40 time.; In these cases, the average was taken. ESPN grades are on a 100-point scale.; Sources: "Purdue Football Commitment List". Rivals.; "Purdue College Football Recruiting Commits". Scout.; "ESPN". ESPN.; "Scout.com Team Recruiting Rankings". Scout.; "2018 Team Ranking". Rivals.com.

== College career ==
In his first game with the Boilermakers and his first game overall, Moore's 313 all-purpose yards set a program record, surpassing Otis Armstrong, who had 312 in 1972. In that same game, Moore had a 76-yard rush to score a touchdown that evened the score at 14–14. The Boilermakers eventually lost the game, 31–27. On September 3, 2018, Moore was named the Co-Freshman of the Week in the Big Ten Conference. On September 24, Moore was once again named Big Ten Freshman of the Week. On October 22, Moore was named Big Ten Freshman of the Week for a third time after leading the Boilermakers with 12 receptions for 170 receiving yards and two touchdowns in a 49–20 victory against #2 ranked Ohio State. On November 25, Moore was named the Big Ten Freshman of the Week for a fourth time following a 12-reception, 141-yard, and two-touchdown performance in a 28–21 win over Indiana.

At the conclusion of the 2018 regular season, Moore had recorded 1,164 receiving yards and 203 rushing yards to go along with 13 combined touchdowns. Moore accumulated 2215 all-purpose yards in 2018, passing the previous school record of 2,121 all purpose yards in 2007 achieved by Dorien Bryant.

In the 2019 home opener against Vanderbilt, Moore caught 13 passes for a career-high 220 yards and a touchdown as the Boilermakers won 42–24. A hamstring injury limited Moore to four games as a sophomore, finishing the season with 29 receptions for 387 yards and two touchdowns.

Moore initially opted out of the 2020 season due to the COVID-19 pandemic and to focus on the 2021 NFL draft, but later announced he would return after the Big Ten reinstated a fall season. Moore suffered a setback to his hamstring and missed the beginning of the regular season. He appeared in three games and finished with 35 receptions for 270 yards.

=== Awards ===
At the end of the 2018 season, Moore was the recipient of the Paul Hornung Award, given to the most versatile player in all of college football. Moore was also named a First-Team All-American by The Athletic, a well-regarded sporting website but not one of the members of the All-American voting process.

On December 10, 2018, Moore was named a First-Team All-American by the Associated Press as an all-purpose back. On December 11, 2018, Moore was named a First-Team All-American by the Football Writers Association of America. On December 12, 2018, The Sporting News named Moore to their second-team, making Moore a consensus All-American and becoming the first true freshman consensus All-American in the country since 2004.

On December 12, 2018, Moore was named the CBS Sports Freshman of the Year.

== Professional career ==
Pre-draft measurables
Height	Weight	Arm length	Hand span	Wingspan	40-yard dash	10-yard split	20-yard split	20-yard shuttle	Three-cone drill	Vertical jump	Broad jump
5 ft 7 in (1.70 m)	181 lb (82 kg)	28 1/4 in (0.72 m)	8 3/4 in (0.22 m)	5 ft 9 3/8 in (1.76 m)	4.32 s	1.58 s	2.48 s	4.10 s	6.68 s	42.5 in (1.08 m)	10 ft 6 in (3.20 m)
All values from Pro Day

=== Arizona Cardinals ===
Moore was selected by the Arizona Cardinals in the second round with the 49th overall pick in the 2021 NFL draft. He signed his four-year rookie contract with Arizona on June 9, 2021. He entered the 2021 season fourth on the Cardinals' wide receiver depth chart. In his second career game, Moore scored his first NFL touchdown on a 77-yard pass from Kyler Murray in the second quarter against the Minnesota Vikings. He finished the season with 54 catches for 435 yards and one touchdown.

After missing the first three games due to a hamstring injury, Moore made his 2022 debut in Week 4. He started the next eight games before being placed on injured reserve on December 14, 2022. Moore finished the 2022 season with 41 receptions for 414 receiving yards and one receiving touchdown.

Moore appeared in all 17 games during the 2023 season, recording 40 receptions for 352 yards and a touchdown. He also set a career-high in rushing with 178 yards and a touchdown on 28 carries.

=== Atlanta Falcons ===
On March 14, 2024, Moore was traded to the Atlanta Falcons in exchange for quarterback Desmond Ridder. On August 8, Moore was placed on season-ending injured reserve following a knee injury in training camp.

=== Minnesota Vikings ===
On March 19, 2025, the Minnesota Vikings signed Moore to a one-year, $2 million contract. On August 9, Moore suffered a season-ending knee injury during a preseason game against the Houston Texans and had to be carted off the field. The injury happened as Texans linebacker Jamal Hill tackled Moore along the sideline as Moore was returning a punt from Tommy Townsend. On August 12, Moore was placed on the injured reserve for the second consecutive year.

== Career statistics ==
=== NFL ===
Year	Team	Games		Receiving					Rushing				
Year	Team	GP	GS	Rec	Yds	Avg	Lng	TD	Att	Yds	Avg	Lng	TD
2021	ARI	14	7	54	435	8.1	77	1	18	76	4.2	26	0
2022	ARI	8	8	41	414	10.1	38	1	6	-5	-0.8	9	0
2023	ARI	17	8	40	352	8.8	48	1	28	178	6.4	45	1
2024	ATL	0	0	Did not play due to injury									
2025	MIN	0	0	Did not play due to injury									
Career		39	23	135	1,201	8.9	77	3	52	249	4.8	45	1

=== College ===
Year	Team	Games		Receiving				Rushing				Kick returns			
Year	Team	GP	GS	Rec	Yards	Avg	TD	Att	Yards	Avg	TD	Ret	Yards	Avg	TD
2018	Purdue	13	10	114	1,258	11.0	12	21	213	10.1	2	33	662	20.1	0
2019	Purdue	4	4	29	387	13.3	2	3	3	1.0	0	9	151	16.8	0
2020	Purdue	3	3	35	270	7.7	0	6	32	5.3	1	0	0	0.0	0
Career		20	17	178	1,915	10.8	14	30	248	8.3	3	42	813	19.4	0

== Death ==
Moore was found dead inside the garage of a property in New Albany, Indiana, on February 21, 2026, at the age of 25. New Albany police chief Todd Bailey determined the cause of death to be a self-inflicted gunshot wound, and ordered an autopsy.

== See also ==
- List of gridiron football players who died during their careers
