= Spencer County High School =

Location
- 520 Taylorsville Road; Taylorsville, Kentucky 40071; United States
- Coordinates: 38.0391°N 85.3384°W

Information
- Type: Public high school
- School district: Spencer County Public Schools
- Principal: Michael Phillips
- Teaching staff: 53.59 (FTE)
- Enrollment: 971 (2023-2024)
- Student to teacher ratio: 18.12
- Campus type: Rural
- Color
- Team name: Bears
- Website: www.spencer.kyschools.us/o/schs

Spencer County High School is a public high school located in Taylorsville, Kentucky.

== Athletics ==
Spencer County's school colors are royal blue and white and their nicknames are Bears (boys) and Lady Bears (girls). Through the Kentucky High School Athletic Association, Spencer County participates in the following sports:

Spencer County High School Sports and Activities
Level	Gender	Sport / Activity
Varsity		Archery
Varsity		Baseball
Varsity	Boys	Basketball
Varsity	Girls	Basketball
Varsity		Cheerleading
Varsity	Boys	Cross Country
Varsity	Girls	Cross Country
Varsity		Dance
Varsity		Fast Pitch Softball
Varsity		Fishing
Varsity		Football
Varsity	Boys	Golf
Varsity	Girls	Golf
Varsity	Boys	Soccer
Varsity	Girls	Soccer
Varsity	Boys	Swimming
Varsity	Girls	Swimming
Varsity	Boys	Tennis
Varsity	Girls	Tennis
Varsity	Boys	Track
Varsity	Girls	Track
Varsity		Volleyball
Varsity		Wrestling
Junior Varsity		Baseball
Junior Varsity	Boys	Basketball
Junior Varsity	Girls	Basketball
Junior Varsity		Fast Pitch Softball
Junior Varsity		Football
Junior Varsity	Boys	Soccer
Junior Varsity		Volleyball
Freshman	Boys	Basketball
Freshman	Girls	Basketball
Freshman		Volleyball

== Demographics ==
As of the 2018–2019 school year, Spencer County High School enrolled 912 students. 828 identified as white, 36 identified as Hispanic, thirty identified as multiracial, 12 identified as black, four identified as Asian, and two identified as American Indian/Alaska native.
