= Patchen Markell =

Patchen Markell (born August 30, 1969) is an associate professor of government at Cornell University. His research interests include a range of issues in contemporary social and political theory. He has written and taught on subjects such as action and responsibility, agency, theories of democracy, gender and sexuality, and the role of affect in politics, as well as on figures such as Hegel, Marx, Hannah Arendt, Habermas, and Aristotle.

== Life ==
He received a Ph.D. in political science from Harvard University in 1999 and a B.A. in Political Science and Philosophy from University of California, Berkeley in 1992.

Markell previously taught at the University of Chicago and served as the co-director of the University of Chicago Political Theory Workshop. He is currently an Editorial Council member of Constellations, and a member of the Editorial Collective of Public Culture.

== Works ==
In 2003, Princeton University Press published his Bound by Recognition, a critical engagement with the politics of recognition, which was awarded the American Political Science Association's Foundations of Political Theory First Book Award. He is currently working on the first book-length study of Arendt's The Human Condition, which builds on some of his prior writings on her work.
