= Ahmad Brooks (cornerback) =

American football player and sports broadcaster (born 1980)

No. 47
- Position: Cornerback

Personal information
- Born: March 13, 1980 (age 46); Abilene, Texas, U.S.
- Listed height: 5 ft 8 in (1.73 m)
- Listed weight: 180 lb (82 kg)

Career information
- High school: Abilene
- College: Texas
- NFL draft: 2002: undrafted

Career history
- Buffalo Bills (2002–2003); New Orleans Saints (2004)*
- * Offseason or practice squad member only

Career NFL statistics
- Tackles: 11
- Interceptions: 1
- Passes defended: 1
- Stats at Pro Football Reference

Ahmad Drushane Brooks (born March 13, 1980) is an American sports broadcaster and former professional football player who is a broadcaster for ESPNU, the Longhorn Network and KTXX-FM. He played as a cornerback in the National Football League (NFL). Brooks played college football for the Texas Longhorns, serving as team captain in 2001. He played in the NFL for three years before retiring from playing in 2005.

== Early life ==
Ahmad excelled in both the classroom and on the field at an early age. By the age of five, he became a Grand Champion in karate where he was given the nickname "Tank" for his exceptional karate skills and abilities. Not only was Ahmad an upcoming karate champion, but he also was a standout in soccer, baseball, and football.

Prior to graduating from Abilene High School, he was a member of the U-16 US National Soccer Pool and led the Abilene Eagles football squad to their best record in decades. In addition, Ahmad became Abilene High’s first Division I football signee in 11 years and the school’s first player to earn a spot in the Texas HS Coaches Association All-Star Game since 1964.

He was voted class president of his high school all four years, while also serving as a four-year student council representative, a member of Youth City Council and a prep scholar and mentor.

== Career ==
=== College ===
In 1998, Ahmad signed and became a valuable member of the University of Texas football team for Coach Mack Brown’s inaugural recruiting class at UT. By the conclusion of his senior year, he and his teammates were deemed as the winningest class in UT history.

Brooks' personal accomplishments include receiving action in 51 games and starting 27 contests while recording 182 tackles, four sacks, four interceptions, 27 pass breakups, seven forced fumbles and three fumble recoveries in four years at UT. In addition, he secured a team-high 88 tackles for the #1 ranked defense in the country during 2001 season, including a career-high 22 stops in the Big 12 Championship Game against Colorado. Brooks led the Longhorns with 16 pass breakups and two interceptions in 1999.

Brooks served as Team Captain in 2001 to his teammates and school along with Major Applewhite and Deandre Lewis. The honors he received included an All-Big 12 mention as well as receiving the University of Texas Outstanding Senior Award for accomplishments on and off the football field. He was a member of the Athletics Dean’s Honor Roll while also serving on the Student-Athlete Advisory Council as the Longhorn football team representative.

=== NFL ===
Following his tenure at Texas, Brooks entered the National Football League as an undrafted free agent signed by the Buffalo Bills in 2002. He was released by the Bills at the end of training camp and signed to the practice squad. He was then moved off the practice squad on October 20, 2002 and played the remainder of the season for the Bills, recording 11 tackles and no sacks.

He was again released by the Bills at the end of training camp in 2003. In 2004 he was signed by the New Orleans Saints and allocated to the NFL Europe. He was later released by them at the end of training camp.

=== NFLE ===
In the NFL Europe in 2004, he played for the Frankfurt Galaxy where he started 10 regular season games, recording an interception, 50 tackles, 5 deflected passes and a forced fumble as the Galaxy made it the championship game. He played in World Bowl XII, stripping the ball for a turnover, but the Galaxy lost.

=== Arena ===
In 2005 he played one game for the Austin Wranglers of the Arena Football League.

== After football ==
Brooks received a Bachelor of Science degree in Communication Studies from UT in the fall of 2005.

Brooks calls football games for ESPNU and appears on ESPN’s Longhorn Network covering Texas football practice, breaking down the Horns in studio and as a football analyst, alongside Ricky Williams and Lowell Galindo.

From 2006 to 2010, Brooks was the television host for Longhorn Sports Center with Mack Brown and radio host of Wake Up Call with Jon Madani from 2008 to 2011 on AM 1300 The Zone. Each year he was on-air as radio host with Longhorn flagship station, he was nominated as "Jock of The Year".

Brooks is also a college football analyst for the university flagship radio station, 104.9 The Horn.

From 2006 to 2013, Brooks worked for Fox Sports Southwest as color commentator and sideline reporter.

In 2012, Brooks co-hosted "Man 2 Man Coverage" on Sundays from 11 a.m. to 12 noon (CST) on the New Talk Radio 96.3 and 1370 with three-time Super Bowl champion Robert Jones.

Brooks' philanthropic efforts include founding HALO and assisting numerous non-profits in raising millions of dollars throughout the years as an emcee and mentoring young people all over the country.
