= Markell Jones =

American football player (born 1996)

No. 8
- Position: Running back

Personal information
- Born: September 26, 1996 (age 30)
- Listed height: 5 ft 11 in (1.80 m)
- Listed weight: 210 lb (95 kg)

Career information
- High school: Columbus (IN) East
- College: Purdue University (2015–2018)
- Stats at ESPN

Markell A. Jones (born September 26, 1996) is an American former college football player who was a running back for the Purdue Boilermakers.

== Early life ==
A native of Columbus, Indiana, Jones attended Columbus East High School in that city. As a high school junior in 2013, he rushed for over 2,600 yards and 42 touchdowns while helping Columbus East to a state championship. On June 24, 2014, Jones committed to playing football at Purdue University with an announcement on Twitter. Jones stated, "Just because there's no other place, another school that is better for me than Purdue." Jones also announced his plans to enroll at Purdue in January, 2015. As a high school senior in 2014, he rushed for a state record of 3,565 yards and 60 touchdowns and completed two passes for 80 yards and two touchdowns. Jones' record-shattering year concluded with the winning of the Indiana Mr. Football Award.

College recruiting
Name	Hometown	School	Height	Weight	Commit date
Markell Jones; RB	Columbus, Indiana	Columbus East High School	5 ft 9 in (1.75 m)	204 lb (93 kg)	Jun 24, 2014
Markell Jones; RB	Recruit ratings: Scout: Rivals: 247Sports: ESPN: (75)				
Overall recruit ranking: Scout: 56 (RB) Rivals: -- (RB), 15 (IN) ESPN: 115 (RB), 17 (IN)
Note: In many cases, Scout, Rivals, 247Sports, On3, and ESPN may conflict in their listings of height and weight.; In these cases, the average was taken. ESPN grades are on a 100-point scale.; Sources: "Purdue Football Commitment List". Rivals.; "Purdue College Football Recruiting Commits". Scout.; "ESPN". ESPN.; "Scout.com Team Recruiting Rankings". Scout.; "2015 Team Ranking". Rivals.com.

== Purdue University ==
=== 2015 season ===
Jones' early enrollment helped him earn repetitions with the first and second teams prior to Purdue's season opener. On September 6, 2015, Jones appeared in his first game at Purdue. Jones ran for 72 yards and scored a rushing touchdown. Jones set a true freshman record with 875 rushing yards and 11 total touchdowns at Purdue.

=== 2016 season ===
Prior to the start of the 2016 season, Jones was named to the Doak Walker Award watch list.

=== Statistics ===
Year	Team	Rushing					Receiving		
Year	Team	Att	Yards	Avg	Yds/G	TD	Rec	Yards	TD
2015	Purdue	168	875	5.2	72.9	10	34	239	1
2016	Purdue	153	616	4.0	56.0	4	32	215	0
2017	Purdue	113	566	5.0	24.0	1	13	54	0
Totals		434	2057	4.6	60.1	15	67	393	1
