= Music City Bowl =

Annual American college football postseason game

- Liberty Mutual Music City Bowl
- Stadium: Nissan Stadium
- Location: Nashville, Tennessee
- Previous stadiums: Vanderbilt Stadium (1998)
- Operated: 1998–present
- Conference tie-ins: Big Ten, SEC
- Previous conference tie-ins: ACC (2006–2019); Big East (1998–2001); Big Ten (2002–2005)
- Payout: US$5.7 million (2019)
- Website: musiccitybowl.com

Sponsors
- American General Life & Accident (1998); HomePoint.com (1999); Gaylord Entertainment (2002–2009); Bridgestone (2003–2007); Franklin American Mortgage (2010–2019); TransPerfect (2020–2024); Liberty Mutual (2025–present)

Former names
- Music City Bowl (1998, 2000–2001); HomePoint.com Music City Bowl (1999); Gaylord Hotels Music City Bowl (2002–2009) presented by Bridgestone (2003–2007); Franklin American Mortgage Music City Bowl (2010–2019); TransPerfect Music City Bowl (2020–2024)

2025 matchup
- Illinois vs. Tennessee (Illinois 30–28)

The Music City Bowl is a college football post-season bowl game contested by NCAA Division I Football Bowl Subdivision (FBS) teams, which has been played in Nashville, Tennessee, since 1998. Since 2025, it has been sponsored by Liberty Mutual and is officially known as the Liberty Mutual Music City Bowl. The bowl has had tie-ins with several different athletic conferences, most recently the Big Ten Conference and Southeastern Conference (SEC).

== History ==
The first Music City Bowl was played at Vanderbilt Stadium in 1998. Beginning in 1999, the game was moved to the recently completed Adelphia Coliseum (now known as Nissan Stadium) in Nashville, Tennessee, the home stadium of the newly renamed Tennessee Titans. American General Life & Accident (now a subsidiary of AIG) sponsored the inaugural 1998 game, and the now-defunct "homepoint.com" sponsored the 1999 game. There was no sponsor in 2000 or 2001. In 2002, with title sponsorship from Nashville-based Gaylord Hotels, the game became known as the Gaylord Hotels Music City Bowl. In 2003, Bridgestone became the presenting sponsor of the game, and its full title became the Gaylord Hotels Music City Bowl presented by Bridgestone. Bridgestone dropped its presenting sponsorship following the 2007 game. Beginning with the 2010 game, Franklin American Mortgage served as title sponsor, with Gaylord continuing as a major sponsor of the event. In December 2019, it was announced that TransPerfect, a New York City-based translation services company, would take over title sponsorship of the bowl for the 2020 through 2025 playings.

The 2020 edition, slated for December 30 between Missouri and Iowa, was cancelled on December 27 due to COVID-19 issues within Missouri's program.

=== Conference tie-ins ===
The game initially featured a matchup between representatives of the Southeastern Conference (SEC) and the Big East Conference. The Big East was replaced by the Big Ten Conference in 2002. Beginning with the 2006 game, the Big Ten was replaced by the Atlantic Coast Conference (ACC). The ACC also took part in the 2005 game, when Virginia appeared because the SEC did not have enough bowl-eligible teams. For six seasons beginning in 2014, the Music City Bowl shared its tie in with the Gator Bowl (also known as the TaxSlayer Bowl for several playings), to match an SEC team with either an ACC or Big Ten team. In June 2019, the Music City Bowl announced an extension to their agreement with the SEC, and an agreement for the Big Ten to provide teams for the 2020 through 2025 seasons.

== Game results ==
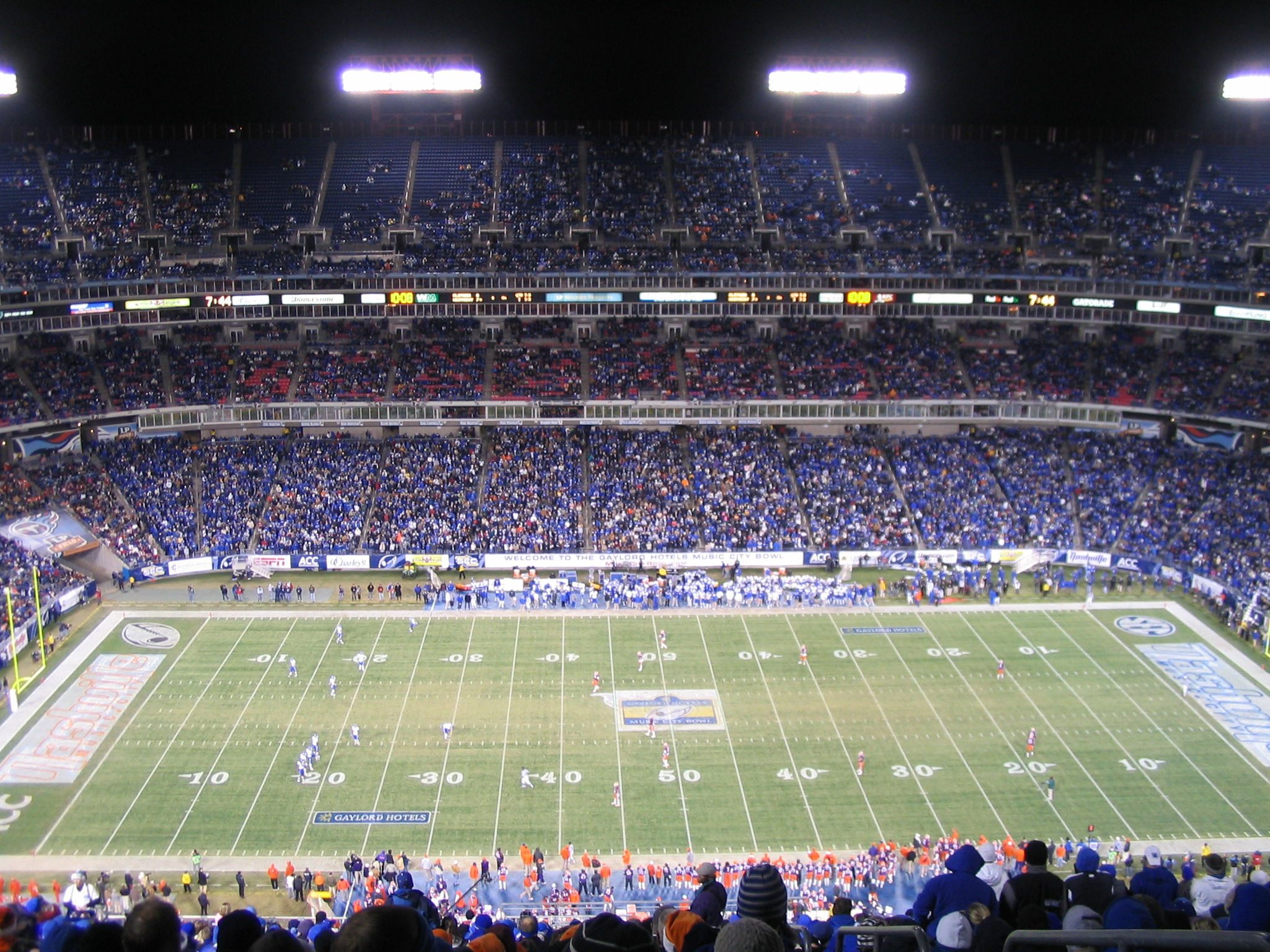
The 2009 Music City Bowl

The Music City Bowl has a history of upsets. The biggest underdog win was when Kentucky (+10) defeated Clemson 28–20 in 2006. Other big upsets include Minnesota (+7) defeating Arkansas 29–14 in 2002, and Virginia (+6) defeating Minnesota 34–31 in 2005. Boston College was a four-point underdog when they defeated Georgia 20–16 in 2001, West Virginia was a three-point underdog when they beat Ole Miss in 2000, Syracuse was a three-point underdog when they defeated Kentucky in 1999, and Minnesota was a one-point underdog when they beat Alabama in 2004. In 2008, four-point underdog Vanderbilt, making their first bowl appearance since 1982, upset Boston College, 24th in the BCS rankings, 16–14.

All rankings are taken from the AP poll prior to the game being played.

Date Played	Winning Team		Losing Team		Attendance	Notes
December 29, 1998	Virginia Tech	38	Alabama	7	41,248 (Note: The 1998 contest was played at Vanderbilt Stadium while Nissan Stadium (then Adelphia Coliseum) was under construction.)	notes
December 29, 1999	Syracuse	20	Kentucky	13	59,221	notes
December 28, 2000	West Virginia	49	Ole Miss	38	47,119	notes
December 28, 2001	Boston College	20	No. 16 Georgia	16	46,125	notes
December 30, 2002	Minnesota	29	No. 25 Arkansas	14	39,183	notes
December 31, 2003	Auburn	28	Wisconsin	14	55,109	notes
December 31, 2004	Minnesota	20	Alabama	16	66,089	notes
December 30, 2005	Virginia	34	Minnesota	31	40,519	notes
December 29, 2006	Kentucky	28	Clemson	20	68,024	notes
December 31, 2007	Kentucky	35	Florida State	28	68,661	notes
December 31, 2008	Vanderbilt	16	Boston College	14	54,250	notes
December 27, 2009	Clemson	21	Kentucky	13	57,280	notes
December 30, 2010	North Carolina	30	Tennessee	27 (2OT)	69,143	notes
December 30, 2011	Mississippi State	23	Wake Forest	17	55,208	notes
December 31, 2012	Vanderbilt	38	NC State	24	55,801	notes
December 30, 2013	Ole Miss	25	Georgia Tech	17	52,125	notes
December 30, 2014	Notre Dame	31	No. 22 LSU	28	60,419	notes
December 30, 2015	Louisville	27	Texas A&M	21	50,478	notes
December 30, 2016	Tennessee	38	No. 24 Nebraska	24	68,496	notes
December 29, 2017	No. 20 Northwestern	24	Kentucky	23	48,675	notes
December 28, 2018	Auburn	63	Purdue	14	59,024	notes
December 30, 2019	Louisville	38	Mississippi State	28	46,850	notes
December 30, 2020	Canceled due to COVID-19 issues (Note: The 2020 contest of Iowa vs. Missouri was canceled three days prior to the game due to COVID-19 issues.)				—	
December 30, 2021	Purdue	48	Tennessee	45 (OT)	69,489	notes
December 31, 2022	Iowa	21	Kentucky	0	42,312	notes
December 30, 2023	Maryland	31	Auburn	13	50,088	notes
December 30, 2024	No. 23 Missouri	27	Iowa	24	43,375	notes
December 30, 2025	Illinois	30	Tennessee	28	52,815	notes

== Most Valuable Players ==
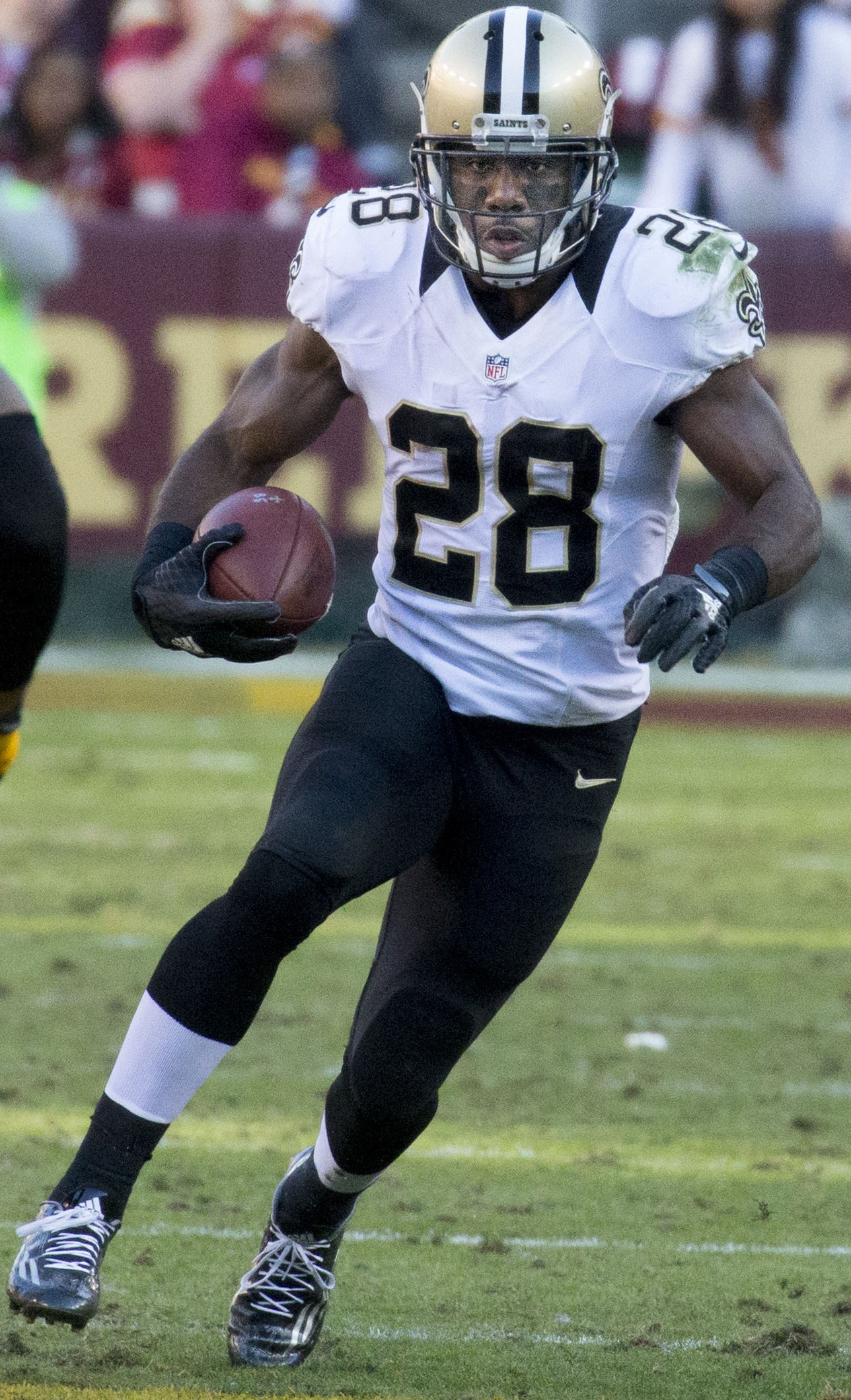
2009 MVP C. J. Spiller

Date played	MVP	Team	Position
December 29, 1998	Corey Moore	Virginia Tech	DE
December 29, 1999	James Mungro	Syracuse	RB
December 29, 2000	Brad Lewis	West Virginia	QB
December 28, 2001	William Green	Boston College	RB
December 30, 2002	Dan Nystrom	Minnesota	K
December 31, 2003	Jason Campbell	Auburn	QB
December 31, 2004	Marion Barber	Minnesota	RB
December 30, 2005	Marques Hagans	Virginia	QB
December 29, 2006	Andre' Woodson	Kentucky	QB
December 31, 2007	Andre' Woodson	Kentucky	QB
December 31, 2008	Brett Upson	Vanderbilt	P
December 27, 2009	C. J. Spiller	Clemson	RB
December 30, 2010	Shaun Draughn	North Carolina	RB
December 30, 2011	Vick Ballard	Mississippi State	RB
December 31, 2012	Zac Stacy	Vanderbilt	RB
December 30, 2013	Bo Wallace	Ole Miss	QB
December 30, 2014	Malik Zaire	Notre Dame	QB
December 30, 2015	Lamar Jackson	Louisville	QB
December 30, 2016	Joshua Dobbs	Tennessee	QB
December 29, 2017	Justin Jackson	Northwestern	RB
December 28, 2018	Jarrett Stidham	Auburn	QB
December 30, 2019	Malik Cunningham	Louisville	QB
December 30, 2021	Broc Thompson	Purdue	WR
December 31, 2022	Cooper DeJean	Iowa	DB
December 30, 2023	Billy Edwards Jr.	Maryland	QB
December 30, 2024	Brady Cook	Missouri	QB
December 30, 2025	Luke Altmyer	Illinois	QB

== Most appearances ==
Updated through the December 2025 edition (27 games, 54 total appearances).

Teams with multiple appearances

Rank	Team	Appearances	Record
1	Kentucky	6	2–4
2	Tennessee	4	1–3
3	Auburn	3	2–1
3	Minnesota	3	2–1
5	Louisville	2	2–0
5	Vanderbilt	2	2–0
5	Boston College	2	1–1
5	Clemson	2	1–1
5	Iowa	2	1–1
5	Mississippi State	2	1–1
5	Ole Miss	2	1–1
5	Purdue	2	1–1
5	Alabama	2	0–2

Teams with a single appearance

Won (10): Illinois, Maryland, Missouri, North Carolina, Northwestern, Notre Dame, Syracuse, Virginia, Virginia Tech, West Virginia
Lost (10): Arkansas, Florida State, Georgia, Georgia Tech, LSU, NC State, Nebraska, Texas A&M, Wake Forest, Wisconsin

== Appearances by conference ==
Updated through the December 2025 edition (27 games, 54 total appearances).

Conference	Record				Appearances by season	
Conference	Games	W	L	Win pct.	Won	Lost
SEC	26	10	16	.385	2003, 2006, 2007, 2008, 2011, 2012, 2013, 2016, 2018, 2024	1998, 1999, 2000, 2001, 2002, 2004, 2009, 2010, 2014, 2015, 2017, 2019, 2021, 2022, 2023, 2025
Big Ten	12	7	5	.583	2002, 2004, 2017, 2021, 2022, 2023, 2025	2003, 2005, 2016, 2018, 2024
ACC	11	5	6	.455	2005, 2009, 2010, 2015, 2019	2006, 2007, 2008, 2011, 2012, 2013
Big East	4	4	0	1.000	1998, 1999, 2000, 2001	
Independents	1	1	0	1.000	2014	

- Independent appearances: Notre Dame (2014)
- The American Conference retains the conference charter of the Big East following the 2013 split of the original Big East along football lines.

== Game records ==
The most lopsided game was Auburn's 63–14 win over Purdue in the 2018 edition. Auburn's 63 points (56 in the first half alone, a record for a half in any bowl game) is the bowl's high score, while Kentucky's 0 points in 2022 is the low score. The closest game was Northwestern's 24–23 win over Kentucky in 2017. The lowest point total in the bowl's history is 21, which occurred in 2022 when Iowa shut out Kentucky. The 87 point total in the 2000 edition, when West Virginia defeated Ole Miss, 49–38, is a high for the bowl. A new attendance record for the bowl of 69,489 was set by the 2021 game, surpassing the prior record of 69,143 that had been set by the 2010 game.

Team	Record, Team vs. Opponent	Year
Most points scored (one team)	63, Auburn vs. Purdue	2018
Most points scored (losing team)	45, Tennessee vs. Purdue	2021
Most points scored (both teams)	93, Purdue (48) vs. Tennessee (45)	2021
Fewest points allowed	0, Iowa (21) v. Kentucky (0)	2022
Largest margin of victory	49, Auburn (63) vs. Purdue (14)	2018
Total yards	666, Tennessee vs. Purdue	2021
Rushing yards	333, Northwestern vs. Kentucky	2017
Passing yards	534, Purdue vs. Tennessee	2021
First downs	31, Tennessee vs. Purdue	2021
Fewest yards	185, Kentucky vs. Iowa	2022
Fewest rushing yards	21, Alabama vs. Minnesota	2004
Fewest passing yards	71, Virginia Tech vs. Alabama	1998
Individual	Record, Player, Team vs. Opponent	Year
All-purpose yards	284, Tobias Palmer (NC State)	2012
Touchdowns (all-purpose)	3, shared by: Joshua Dobbs (Tennessee); Darius Slayton (Auburn); Cedric Tillman (Tennessee)	2016; 2018; 2021
Rushing yards	226, Lamar Jackson (Louisville)	2015
Rushing touchdowns	3, Joshua Dobbs (Tennessee)	2016
Passing yards	534, Aidan O'Connell (Purdue)	2021
Passing touchdowns	5, shared by: Brad Lewis (West Virginia); Jarrett Stidham (Auburn); Hendon Hooker (Tennessee); Aidan O'Connell (Purdue)	2000; 2018; 2021; 2021
Receptions	11, shared by: Josh Reynolds (Texas A&M); Rondale Moore (Purdue)	2015; 2018
Receiving yards	217, Broc Thompson (Purdue)	2021
Receiving touchdowns	3, shared by: Darius Slayton (Auburn); Cedric Tillman (Tennessee)	2018; 2021
Tackles	20, Jeremy Banks (Tennessee)	2021
Sacks	3.0, Devonte Fields (Louisville)	2015
Interceptions	2, Michael Lehan (Minnesota)	2002
Long Plays	Record, Team vs. Opponent	Year
Touchdown run	89 yds., Leonard Fournette (LSU)	2014
Touchdown pass	75 yds., shared by: Anthony Jennings to John Diarse (LSU); Aidan O'Connell to Broc Thompson (Purdue)	2014; 2021
Kickoff return	100 yds., Leonard Fournette (LSU)	2014
Punt return	47 yds., Rafael Little (Kentucky)	2006
Interception return	65 yds., Trey Wilson (Vanderbilt)	2012
Fumble return	31 yds., Khane Pass (Louisville)	2019
Punt	68 yds., Tyler Campbell (Ole Miss)	2013
Field goal	49 yds., Jack Howes (Maryland)	2023
Miscellaneous	Record, Team vs. Opponent	Year
Bowl Attendance	69,489, Purdue vs. Tennessee	2021

== Media coverage ==
The bowl has been televised by ESPN since its inception.
