= List of Tennessee Volunteers bowl games =

The Tennessee Volunteers college football team competes as part of the NCAA Division I Football Bowl Subdivision (FBS), representing the University of Tennessee in the Eastern Division of the Southeastern Conference (SEC). Since the establishment of the team in 1891, Tennessee has appeared in 56 bowl games with a 31–25 overall record. Included in these games are 17 combined appearances in the traditional "big four" bowl games (the Rose, Sugar, Cotton and Orange) and two Bowl Championship Series (BCS) game appearances.

Through the history of the program, eight separate coaches have led the Volunteers to bowl games with Phillip Fulmer having the most appearances with 15. Fulmer also led Tennessee to the Bowl Alliance national championship game in the 1998 Orange Bowl and the first BCS national championship game in the 1999 Fiesta Bowl.

With the expansion of the College Football Playoff in 2024, Tennessee has indicated they will not include first round games under their listed bowl games. Instead they will, “create an overarching ‘postseason record’ to take the expanded CFP into account”.

== Key ==
General
†	Bowl game record attendance
‡	Former bowl game record attendance
§	Denotes College Football Playoff game
*	Denotes national championship game

Results
W	Win
L	Loss

== Bowl games ==
List of bowl games showing bowl played in, score, date, season, opponent, stadium, location, attendance and head coach (Note: Statistics correct as of 2025–26 NCAA football bowl games.)
#	Bowl	Score (Note: Results are sortable first by whether the result was a Tennessee win, loss or tie and then second by the margin of victory.)	Date	Season (Note: Links to the season article for the Tennessee team that competed in the bowl for that year.)	Opponent (Note: Links to the season article for the opponent that Tennessee competed against in the bowl for that year when available or to their general page when unavailable.)	Stadium	Location	Attendance	Head coach
0 (Note: Game is considered an unofficial exhibition game by the NCAA)	New York Charity Game	W 13–0	December 5, 1931	1931	New York University	Yankee Stadium	New York City	40,684^{‡}	Robert Neyland
1	Orange Bowl	W 17–0	January 2, 1939	1938	Oklahoma	Burdine Stadium (Note: Originally called Burdine Stadium, in 1960 it was renamed as the Miami Orange Bowl.)	Miami	32,191^{‡}	Robert Neyland
2	Rose Bowl	L 0–14	January 1, 1940	1939	USC	Rose Bowl	Pasadena	92,200^{‡}	Robert Neyland
3	Sugar Bowl	L 13–19	January 1, 1941	1940	Boston College	Tulane Stadium	New Orleans	73,181^{‡}	Robert Neyland
4	Sugar Bowl	W 14–7	January 1, 1943	1942	Tulsa	Tulane Stadium	New Orleans	70,000	Robert Neyland
5	Rose Bowl	L 0–25	January 1, 1945	1944	USC	Rose Bowl	Pasadena	68,000	Robert Neyland
6	Orange Bowl	L 0–8	January 1, 1947	1946	Rice	Burdine Stadium	Miami	36,152^{‡}	Robert Neyland
7	Cotton Bowl Classic	W 20–14	January 1, 1951	1950	Texas	Cotton Bowl	Dallas	75,349^{‡}	Robert Neyland
8	Sugar Bowl	L 13–28	January 1, 1952	1951	Maryland	Tulane Stadium	New Orleans	82,000	Robert Neyland
9	Cotton Bowl Classic	L 0–16	January 1, 1953	1952	Texas	Cotton Bowl	Dallas	75,504^{‡}	Robert Neyland
10	Sugar Bowl	L 7–13	January 1, 1957	1956	Baylor	Tulane Stadium	New Orleans	81,000	Bowden Wyatt
11	Gator Bowl	W 3–0	December 28, 1957	1957	Texas A&M	Gator Bowl Stadium	Jacksonville	41,160^{‡}	Bowden Wyatt
12	Bluebonnet Bowl	W 27–6	December 18, 1965	1965	Tulsa	Rice Stadium	Houston	40,000	Doug Dickey
13	Gator Bowl	W 18–12	December 31, 1966	1966	Syracuse	Gator Bowl Stadium	Jacksonville	60,312^{‡}	Doug Dickey
14	Orange Bowl	L 24–26	January 1, 1968	1967	Oklahoma	Miami Orange Bowl	Miami	77,993^{‡}	Doug Dickey
15	Cotton Bowl Classic	L 13–36	January 1, 1969	1968	Texas	Cotton Bowl	Dallas	72,000	Doug Dickey
16	Gator Bowl	L 13–14	December 27, 1969	1969	Florida	Gator Bowl Stadium	Jacksonville	72,248^{‡}	Doug Dickey
17	Sugar Bowl	W 34–13	January 1, 1971	1970	Air Force	Tulane Stadium	New Orleans	78,655	Bill Battle
18	Liberty Bowl	W 14–13	December 20, 1971	1971	Arkansas	Memphis Memorial Stadium (Note: Originally called Memphis Memorial Stadium, in 1976 it was renamed Liberty Bowl Memorial Stadium.)	Memphis	51,410^{‡}	Bill Battle
19	Bluebonnet Bowl	W 24–17	December 30, 1972	1972	LSU	Houston Astrodome	Houston	52,961	Bill Battle
20	Gator Bowl	L 19–28	December 29, 1973	1973	Texas Tech	Gator Bowl Stadium	Jacksonville	62,109	Bill Battle
21	Liberty Bowl	W 7–3	December 16, 1974	1974	Maryland	Memphis Memorial Stadium	Memphis	51,284	Bill Battle
22	Bluebonnet Bowl	L 22–27	December 31, 1979	1979	Purdue	Houston Astrodome	Houston	40,542	Johnny Majors
23	Garden State Bowl	W 28–21	December 13, 1981	1981	Wisconsin	Giants Stadium	East Rutherford	38,782	Johnny Majors
24	Peach Bowl	L 22–28	December 31, 1982	1982	Iowa	Atlanta–Fulton County Stadium	Atlanta	50,134	Johnny Majors
25	Florida Citrus Bowl	W 30–23	December 17, 1983	1983	Maryland	Citrus Bowl	Orlando	50,183	Johnny Majors
26	Sun Bowl	L 27–28	December 22, 1984	1984	Maryland	Sun Bowl Stadium	El Paso	50,126^{‡}	Johnny Majors
27	Sugar Bowl	W 35–7	January 1, 1986	1985	Miami	Louisiana Superdome	New Orleans	77,432	Johnny Majors
28	Liberty Bowl	W 21–14	December 29, 1986	1986	Minnesota	Liberty Bowl Memorial Stadium	Memphis	51,327	Johnny Majors
29	Peach Bowl	W 27–22	January 2, 1988	1987	Indiana	Atlanta–Fulton County Stadium	Atlanta	58,737^{‡}	Johnny Majors
30	Cotton Bowl Classic	W 31–27	January 1, 1990	1989	Arkansas	Cotton Bowl	Dallas	74,358	Johnny Majors
31	Sugar Bowl	W 23–22	January 1, 1991	1990	Virginia	Louisiana Superdome	New Orleans	77,452	Johnny Majors
32	Fiesta Bowl	L 17–42	January 1, 1992	1991	Penn State	Sun Devil Stadium	Tempe	71,133	Johnny Majors
33	Hall of Fame Bowl (Note: The Outback Bowl was previously known as the Hall of Fame Bowl (1986–1995).)	W 38–23	January 1, 1993	1992	Boston College	Tampa Stadium	Tampa	52,056	Phillip Fulmer
34	Florida Citrus Bowl	L 13–31	January 1, 1994	1993	Penn State	Citrus Bowl	Orlando	72,456^{‡}	Phillip Fulmer
35	Gator Bowl	W 45–23	December 30, 1994	1994	Virginia Tech	Ben Hill Griffin Stadium	Gainesville	62,200	Phillip Fulmer
36	Florida Citrus Bowl	W 20–14	January 1, 1996	1995	Ohio State	Citrus Bowl	Orlando	70,797	Phillip Fulmer
37	Florida Citrus Bowl	W 48–28	January 1, 1997	1996	Northwestern	Citrus Bowl	Orlando	63,467	Phillip Fulmer
38	Orange Bowl*	L 17–42	January 2, 1998	1997	Nebraska	Pro Player Stadium	Miami Gardens	74,002	Phillip Fulmer
39	Fiesta Bowl*	W 23–16	January 4, 1999	1998	Florida State	Sun Devil Stadium	Tempe	80,470^{†}	Phillip Fulmer
40	Fiesta Bowl	L 21–31	January 2, 2000	1999	Nebraska	Sun Devil Stadium	Tempe	71,526	Phillip Fulmer
41	Cotton Bowl Classic	L 21–35	January 1, 2001	2000	Kansas State	Cotton Bowl	Dallas	63,465	Phillip Fulmer
42	Florida Citrus Bowl	W 45–17	January 1, 2002	2001	Michigan	Citrus Bowl	Orlando	59,653	Phillip Fulmer
43	Peach Bowl	L 3–30	December 31, 2002	2002	Maryland	Georgia Dome	Atlanta	68,330	Phillip Fulmer
44	Peach Bowl	L 14–27	January 2, 2004	2003	Clemson	Georgia Dome	Atlanta	75,125^{‡}	Phillip Fulmer
45	Cotton Bowl Classic	W 38–7	January 1, 2005	2004	Texas A&M	Cotton Bowl	Dallas	75,704	Phillip Fulmer
46	Outback Bowl	L 10–20	January 1, 2007	2006	Penn State	Raymond James Stadium	Tampa	65,601	Phillip Fulmer
47	Outback Bowl	W 21–17	January 1, 2008	2007	Wisconsin	Raymond James Stadium	Tampa	60,121	Phillip Fulmer
48	Chick-fil-A Bowl (Note: The Chick-fil-A Bowl was previously known as the Peach (1968–1996) and as the Chick-fil-A Peach Bowl (1997–2005).)	L 14–37	December 31, 2009	2009	Virginia Tech	Georgia Dome	Atlanta	73,777	Lane Kiffin
49	Music City Bowl	L 27–30	December 30, 2010	2010	North Carolina	LP Field	Nashville	69,143^{†}	Derek Dooley
50	TaxSlayer Bowl (Note: The TaxSlayer Bowl was previously known as the Gator Bowl (1948–2014). The Gator Bowl name returned in 2018.)	W 45–28	January 2, 2015	2014	Iowa	EverBank Field	Jacksonville	56,310	Butch Jones
51	Outback Bowl	W 45–6	January 1, 2016	2015	Northwestern	Raymond James Stadium	Tampa	53,202	Butch Jones
52	Music City Bowl	W 38–24	December 30, 2016	2016	Nebraska	Nissan Stadium	Nashville	68,496	Butch Jones
53	Gator Bowl	W* 23–22	January 2, 2020	2019	Indiana	TIAA Bank Field	Jacksonville	61,789	Jeremy Pruitt
54	Music City Bowl	L 45–48	December 30, 2021	2021	Purdue	Nissan Stadium	Nashville	69,489	Josh Heupel
55	Orange Bowl	W 31–14	December 30, 2022	2022	Clemson	Hard Rock Stadium	Miami Gardens	63,912	Josh Heupel
56	Citrus Bowl	W 35–0	January 1, 2024	2023	Iowa	Camping World Stadium	Orlando	43,861	Josh Heupel
57	Music City Bowl	L 28–30	December 30, 2025	2025	Illinois	Nissan Stadium	Nashville	52,815	Josh Heupel

== Notes ==
* The NCAA vacated Tennessee's win as part of a disciplinary action affecting the 2019 and 2020 seasons.
