= 2018 Tennessee Volunteers football team =

American college football season

2018 Tennessee Volunteers football
- Conference: Southeastern Conference
- Eastern Division
- Record: 5–7 (2–6 SEC)
- Head coach: Jeremy Pruitt (1st season)
- Offensive coordinator: Tyson Helton (1st season)
- Offensive scheme: Pro-style
- Defensive coordinator: Kevin Sherrer (1st season)
- Co-defensive coordinator: Chris Rumph (1st season)
- Base defense: 3–4
- Home stadium: Neyland Stadium

2018 Southeastern Conference football standings
	Conf.			Overall
Team	W		L	W		L
Eastern Division
No. T–7 Georgia x	7	–	1	11	–	3
No. 12 Kentucky	5	–	3	10	–	3
No. T–7 Florida	5	–	3	10	–	3
South Carolina	4	–	4	7	–	6
Missouri	4	–	4	8	–	5
Vanderbilt	3	–	5	6	–	7
Tennessee	2	–	6	5	–	7
Western Division
No. 2 Alabama x$^	8	–	0	14	–	1
No. 16 Texas A&M	5	–	3	9	–	4
No. 6 LSU	5	–	3	10	–	3
Mississippi State*	4	–	4	8	–	5
Auburn	3	–	5	8	–	5
Ole Miss	1	–	7	5	–	7
Arkansas	0	–	8	2	–	10
Championship: Alabama 35, Georgia 28
^ – College Football Playoff participant; $ – Conference champion; x – Division champion/co-champions; * Mississippi State vacated four conference and eight total wins due to NCAA violations.; Rankings from AP Poll

The 2018 Tennessee Volunteers football team represented the University of Tennessee in the 2018 NCAA Division I FBS football season. The Volunteers played their home games at Neyland Stadium in Knoxville, Tennessee and competed in the Eastern Division of the Southeastern Conference (SEC). They were led by first-year head coach Jeremy Pruitt. They finished the season 5–7, 2–6 in SEC play to finish in last place in the Eastern Division.

== Preseason ==
=== 2018 recruiting class ===
College recruiting information (2018)
Name	Hometown	School	Height	Weight	Commit date
Trevon Flowers; S	Tucker, GA	Tucker	5 ft 11 in (1.80 m)	185 lb (84 kg)	Feb 7, 2018
Trevon Flowers; S	Recruit ratings: Scout: Rivals: 247Sports: ESPN: (76)				
J.J. Peterson; OLB	Moultrie, GA	Colquitt County	6 ft 2 in (1.88 m)	210 lb (95 kg)	Jan 6, 2018
J.J. Peterson; OLB	Recruit ratings: Scout: Rivals: 247Sports: ESPN: (86)				
John Mincey; DT	Homerville, GA	Clinch County	6 ft 3 in (1.91 m)	250 lb (110 kg)	Jan 19, 2018
John Mincey; DT	Recruit ratings: Scout: Rivals: 247Sports: ESPN: (77)				
Cedric Tillman; WR	Las Vegas, NV	Bishop Gorman	6 ft 1 in (1.85 m)	205 lb (93 kg)	Feb 7, 2018
Cedric Tillman; WR	Recruit ratings: Scout: Rivals: 247Sports: ESPN: (NR)				
Dominick Wood-Anderson; TE	San Diego, CA	Arizona Western (JC)	6 ft 6 in (1.98 m)	255 lb (116 kg)	Dec 20, 2017
Dominick Wood-Anderson; TE	Recruit ratings: Rivals: 247Sports: ESPN: (81)				
Jeremy Banks; RB	Cordova, TN	Cordova	6 ft 2 in (1.88 m)	215 lb (98 kg)	Dec 20, 2017
Jeremy Banks; RB	Recruit ratings: Rivals: 247Sports: ESPN: (78)				
Jordan Allen; DE	Fairfield, CA	City College SF (JC)	6 ft 5 in (1.96 m)	230 lb (100 kg)	Dec 20, 2017
Jordan Allen; DE	Recruit ratings: Rivals: 247Sports: ESPN: (82)				
J. T. Shrout; QB	Newhall, CA	Hart	6 ft 3 in (1.91 m)	190 lb (86 kg)	Dec 20, 2017
J. T. Shrout; QB	Recruit ratings: Rivals: 247Sports: ESPN: (79)				
Jerome Carvin; OL	Cordova, TN	Cordova	6 ft 4 in (1.93 m)	305 lb (138 kg)	Dec 20, 2017
Jerome Carvin; OL	Recruit ratings: Rivals: 247Sports: ESPN: (79)				
Kingston Harris; DT	Bradenton, FL	IMG Academy	6 ft 4 in (1.93 m)	260 lb (120 kg)	Dec 18, 2017
Kingston Harris; DT	Recruit ratings: Rivals: 247Sports: ESPN: (76)				
Alontae Taylor; ATH, WR	Manchester, TN	Coffee County Central	6 ft 0 in (1.83 m)	180 lb (82 kg)	Dec 22, 2017
Alontae Taylor; ATH, WR	Recruit ratings: Scout: Rivals: 247Sports: ESPN: (86)				
Paxton Brooks; K	West Columbia, SC	Airport	6 ft 5 in (1.96 m)	170 lb (77 kg)	Aug 17, 2017
Paxton Brooks; K	Recruit ratings: Rivals: 247Sports: ESPN: (77)				
Tanner Antonutti; OL	Nashville, TN	Ensworth	6 ft 5 in (1.96 m)	260 lb (120 kg)	Jul 30, 2017
Tanner Antonutti; OL	Recruit ratings: Rivals: 247Sports: ESPN: (76)				
Greg Emerson; DE	Jackson, TN	Northside	6 ft 4 in (1.93 m)	280 lb (130 kg)	Jul 3, 2017
Greg Emerson; DE	Recruit ratings: Rivals: 247Sports: ESPN: (81)				
Jacob Warren; TE	Knoxville, TN	Farragut	6 ft 6 in (1.98 m)	210 lb (95 kg)	May 24, 2017
Jacob Warren; TE	Recruit ratings: Rivals: 247Sports: ESPN: (77)				
Brant Lawless; DT	Nashville, TN	Nashville Christian	6 ft 3 in (1.91 m)	300 lb (140 kg)	May 1, 2017
Brant Lawless; DT	Recruit ratings: Rivals: 247Sports: ESPN: (83)				
Ollie Lane; OL	Corryton, TN	Gibbs	6 ft 5 in (1.96 m)	270 lb (120 kg)	Apr 12, 2017
Ollie Lane; OL	Recruit ratings: Rivals: 247Sports: ESPN: (77)				
Matthew Flint; LB	Gurley, AL	Madison County	6 ft 0 in (1.83 m)	205 lb (93 kg)	Aug 2, 2017
Matthew Flint; LB	Recruit ratings: Rivals: 247Sports: ESPN: (78)				
Jahmir Johnson; OT	Philadelphia, PA	Arizona Western (JC)	6 ft 5 in (1.96 m)	290 lb (130 kg)	Dec 27, 2017
Jahmir Johnson; OT	Recruit ratings: Rivals: 247Sports: ESPN: (79)				
D'Andre Litaker; DT	Murfreesboro, TN	Riverdale	6 ft 3 in (1.91 m)	285 lb (129 kg)	Jun 13, 2017
D'Andre Litaker; DT	Recruit ratings: Rivals: 247Sports: ESPN: (80)				
Overall recruit ranking: Scout: 22 Rivals: 20 247Sports: 20 ESPN: 25
Note: In many cases, Scout, Rivals, 247Sports, On3, and ESPN may conflict in their listings of height and weight.; In these cases, the average was taken. ESPN grades are on a 100-point scale.; Sources: "2018 Team Ranking". Rivals.com.

=== Award watch lists ===
Listed in the order that they were released

Award	Player	Position	Year
Chuck Bednarik Award	Nigel Warrior	S	JR
Outland Trophy	Trey Smith	OL	SO
Wuerffel Trophy	Kyle Phillips	DL	SR
Johnny Unitas Golden Arm Award	Keller Chryst	QB	GS

=== SEC media poll ===
The SEC media poll was released on July 20, 2018, with the Volunteers predicted to finish in sixth place in the East Division.

=== Preseason All-SEC teams ===
The Volunteers had one player selected to the preseason all-SEC teams.

Offense

1st team

Trey Smith – OL

== Schedule ==
Tennessee announced its 2018 football schedule on September 19, 2017. The 2018 schedule consisted of 7 home games, 4 away, and 1 neutral site game in the regular season. The Volunteers hosted SEC foes Florida, Alabama, Kentucky, and Missouri, and traveled to Georgia, Auburn, South Carolina, and Vanderbilt.

The Volunteers hosted three of its four non–conference games which were against ETSU from the Southern Conference, UTEP and Charlotte, both of whom competed in the Conference USA. They traveled to Charlotte, North Carolina, for the Belk Kickoff against West Virginia from the Big 12 Conference.

Date	Time	Opponent	Site	TV	Result	Attendance
September 1	3:30 p.m.	vs. No. 17 West Virginia*	Bank of America Stadium; Charlotte, NC (Belk Kickoff Game / SEC Nation)	CBS	L 14–40	66,793
September 8	4:00 p.m.	East Tennessee State*	Neyland Stadium; Knoxville, TN	SECN	W 59–3	96,464
September 15	12:00 p.m.	UTEP*	Neyland Stadium; Knoxville, TN	SECN	W 24–0	87,074
September 22	7:00 p.m.	Florida	Neyland Stadium; Knoxville, TN (rivalry)	ESPN	L 21–47	100,027
September 29	3:30 p.m.	at No. 2 Georgia	Sanford Stadium; Athens, GA (rivalry)	CBS	L 12–38	92,246
October 13	12:00 p.m.	at No. 21 Auburn	Jordan–Hare Stadium; Auburn, AL (rivalry / SEC Nation)	SECN	W 30–24	84,589
October 20	3:30 p.m.	No. 1 Alabama	Neyland Stadium; Knoxville, TN (Third Saturday in October / SEC Nation)	CBS	L 21–58	97,087
October 27	7:30 p.m.	at South Carolina	Williams-Brice Stadium; Columbia, SC (rivalry)	SECN	L 24–27	80,614
November 3	4:00 p.m.	Charlotte*	Neyland Stadium; Knoxville, TN	SECN	W 14–3	86,753
November 10	3:30 p.m.	No. 12 Kentucky	Neyland Stadium; Knoxville, TN (rivalry)	SECN	W 24–7	95,258
November 17	3:30 p.m.	Missouri	Neyland Stadium; Knoxville, TN	CBS	L 17–50	88,224
November 24	4:00 p.m.	at Vanderbilt	Vanderbilt Stadium; Nashville, TN (rivalry)	SECN	L 13–38	35,887
*Non-conference game; Rankings from AP Poll released prior to the game; All times are in Eastern time

Schedule source:

== Personnel ==
=== Roster and staff ===
2018 Tennessee Volunteers football team roster
Players
Coaches
Offense

Pos.	#	Name	Class
WR	1	Marquez Callaway	Jr
QB	2	Jarrett Guarantano	So
RB	3	Ty Chandler	So
WR	5	Josh Palmer	So
WR	7	Brandon Johnson	Jr
WR	8	Latrell Williams	So
RB	9	Tim Jordan	So
WR	10	Tyler Byrd	Jr
WR	11	Jordan Murphy	So
QB	12	J. T. Shrout	So
WR	13	Richard Mize Jr.	So
QB	14	Zac Jancek	Jr
WR	15	Jauan Jennings	Jr
QB	17	Will McBride	So
RB	18	Princeton Fant	Fr
QB	19	Keller Chryst	Sr
WR	21	Jacquez Jones	Jr
RB	24	Trey Coleman	So
WR	26	Jay Shoop	Fr
RB	28	James Christian	So
RB	29	Jeremiah Howard	So
RB	31	Madre London	Sr
RB	33	Jeremy Banks	Fr
WR	34	Malik Elion	Sr
RB	35	Ramsey Hailey	So
RB	36	Tanner Dobrucky	Fr
WR	38	Grant Frerking	Fr
WR	38	Brent McPherson	Jr
RB	42	Chip Omer	So
TE/RB	48	Ja'Quain Blakely	So
OL	50	Joey Cave	So
OL	51	Drew Richmond	Jr
OL	56	Riley Locklear	So
OL	57	Nathan Niehaus	So
OL	58	Brandon Kennedy (injured)	Jr
OL	60	Michael Raymond	Jr
OL	66	Jarious Abercrombie	Fr
OL	67	Joe Keeler	Jr
OL	68	Marcus Tatum	So
OL	69	Brian Garvey	So
OL	70	Ryan Johnson	So
OL	71	Tanner Antonutti	Fr
OL	72	Jahmir Johnson	So
OL	73	Trey Smith	So
OL	74	K'Rojhn Calbert	Fr
OL	75	Jerome Carvin	Fr
OL	76	Chance Hall	Jr
OL	77	Devante Brooks	So
TE	80	Eli Wolf	Jr
TE	81	Austin Pope	So
TE	82	Dominick Wood-Anderson	Jr
WR	83	Cooper Melton	So
TE	84	James Brown	Fr
WR	85	Cedric Tillman	Fr
TE	86	Andrew Craig	Fr
TE	87	Jacob Warren	Fr
TE	88	LaTrell Bumphus	So
TE	89	Brandon Benedict	So
OL	99	Ollie Lane	Fr

Defense

Pos.	#	Name	Class
LB	1	Jonathan Kongbo	Sr
DL	2	Shy Tuttle	Sr
DB	3	Marquill Osborne	Jr
DL	5	Kyle Phillips	Sr
DB	6	Alontae Taylor	Fr
DB	7	Bryce Collier	Jr
LB	7	Jordan Allen	So
DB	9	Garrett Johnson	Jr
DB	10	Bryce Thompson	Fr
LB	11	Austin Smith	Jr
DB	12	Zach Weatherly	So
LB	13	Deandre Johnson	So
DB	14	Quart'e Sapp	Jr
DB	15	Shawn Shamburger	Jr
LB	17	Dillion Bates	Sr
DB	18	Nigel Warrior	Jr
LB	19	Darrell Taylor	Jr
DB	20	Cheyenne Labruzza	Fr
LB	21	Shanon Reid	So
DB	22	Micah Abernathy	Sr
LB	23	Will Ignont	Jr
DB	24	Todd Kelly Jr.	Sr
DB	25	Trevon Flowers	Fr
DB	26	Theo Jackson	So
DB	27	Carlin Fils-Aime	Jr
DB	28	Baylen Buchanan	Jr
DB	29	Brandon Davis	Fr
DB	31	D.J. Henderson	Sr
DB	33	MaLeik Gatewood	Jr
LB	34	Darrin Kirkland Jr	Jr
LB	35	Daniel Bituli	Jr
DB	36	Terrell Bailey	Fr
DB	37	Sam Harvin	Jr
LB	38	Solon Page III	Fr
LB	39	Nick Humphrey	So
LB	40	J.J. Peterson	Fr
DB	41	Kenneth George Jr.	So
LB	42	Nyles Gaddy	Fr
DB	43	Jake Powers	So
LB	46	Joshua Warren	Fr
LB	47	Landon Knoll	Jr
LB	48	Matt Ballard	So
LB	50	Cole Hughes	Jr
DB	51	Kingston Harris	Fr
DL	52	Maurese Smith	Fr
DL	55	Gatkek Kueth	Fr
DL	56	Matthew Butler	So
DL	59	John Mincey	Fr
DL	64	Kurott Garland	Fr
DB	79	Bryce Collier	Jr
DL	93	Emmit Gooden	Jr
DL	95	Kivon Bennett	So
DL	96	Airin Spell	Fr
DL	97	Paul Bain	Sr
DL	98	Alexis Johnson	Sr

Special teams

Pos.	#	Name	Class
PK	30	Brent Cimaglia	So
P	37	Paxton Brooks	Fr
P	39	Grayson Pontius	Jr
PK	41	Ryan Tice	Sr
PK	43	Laszlo Toser	Jr
LS	46	Riley Lovingood	Jr
P	47	Joe Doyle	Fr
LS	52	Elijah Medford	Sr
LS	59	Jake Yelich	So
PK	97	Jackson Morris	So

Head coach

- Jeremy Pruitt – 1st year

Coordinators/assistant coaches

- Tyson Helton (Offensive coordinator/quarterbacks) – 1st year
- Kevin Sherrer (Defensive coordinator/inside linebackers) – 1st year
- Chris Rumph (Co-defensive coordinator/outside linebackers) – 1st year
- Chris Weinke (Running backs coach) – 1st year
- Charles Kelly (Special teams coordinator/safeties) – 1st year
- Terry Fair (Cornerbacks coach) – 1st year
- David Johnson (Wide receivers coach) – 1st year
- Will Friend (Offensive line coach) – 1st year
- Tracy Rocker (Defensive line coach) – 1st year
- Brian Niedermeyer (Tight ends coach) – 1st year
- Craig Fitzgerald (Director of Strength and Conditioning) – 1st year
- Support Staff
- Jon Shalala
- Karmichael Dunbar
- Nate Andrews
- Brandon Deaderick
- Bert Biffani
- Tino Sunseri
- Kevin Simon
- Carter Blount
- Vince Lewis
- Cam Clemmons
- Kevin O’Brien
- Caleb Cox
- John Lilly
- Shelton Felton
- Todd Watson

Legend

- (C) Team captain
- (S) Suspended
- (I) Ineligible
- Injured
- Redshirt

Roster

=== Current depth chart ===
Defense

FS
Nigel Warrior
Shawn Shamburger
Todd Kelly Jr.

JACK	MLB	WLB	SAM
Jonathan Kongbo	Daniel Bituli	Darren Kirkland Jr. Quart'e Sapp	Darrell Taylor
Deandre Johnson	Will Ignont	Dillon Bates	Austin Smith
⋅	⋅	⋅	Jordan Allen

Safety
Micah Abernathy
Trevon Flowers
Theo Jackson

CB
Alontae Taylor
Bryce Thompson
Carlin Fils-aime
⋅

DE	NT	DE
Kyle Phillips	Shy Tuttle	Alexis Johnson
Paul Bain	Emmit Gooden	Kingston Harris
⋅	⋅	⋅

CB
Baylen Buchanan
Marquill Osborne
DJ Henderson

Offense

WR
Marquez Callaway
Tyler Byrd
Cedric Tillman

WR
Brandon Johnson
Jordan Murphy
⋅

LT	LG	C	RG	RT
Trey Smith	Jahmir Johnson; Riley Locklear	Ryan Johnson	Jerome Carvin	Drew Richmond; Marcus Tatum; Chance Hall
Nathan Niehaus	K'Rojhn Calbert	⋅	Riley Locklear	⋅
⋅	⋅	⋅	⋅	⋅

TE
Dominick Wood-Anderson
Eli Wolf
Austin Pope
⋅

WR
Josh Palmer
Jauan Jennings
⋅
⋅

QB
Jarrett Guarantano
Keller Chryst
Will McBride
J. T. Shrout

Special teams
PK Brent Cimaglia
PK Laszlo Toser
P Joe Doyle
Paxton Brooks

LS Riley Lovingood
Elijah Medford

RB
Tim Jordan
Ty Chandler
Madre London
Jeremy Banks
⋅

== Game summaries ==
=== Vs. West Virginia ===
Belk Kickoff Game

Team	1	2	3	4	Total
• No. 17 West Virginia	10	3	20	7	40
Tennessee	0	7	7	0	14

- Location: Charlotte, North Carolina
- Game start: 3:30 p.m.
- Elapsed time: 4:00
- Game attendance: 66,793
- Game weather: Temperature: 89 °F (32 °C) • Wind: 4 mph (6.4 km/h) • Weather: Sunny
- Referee: Gary Patterson
- TV announcers (CBS): Brad Nessler (play-by-play), Gary Danielson (color), Jamie Erdahl (sidelines)

Scoring summary
1	11:00	WVU	Evan Staley 26-yard field goal	WVU 3–0
1	3:32	WVU	T.J. Simmons 59-yard pass from Will Grier (Staley kick)	WVU 10–0
2	6:13	TENN	Dominick Wood-Anderson 1-yard pass from Jarrett Guarantano (Brent Cimaglia kick)	WVU 10–7
2	0:00	WVU	Staley 35-yard field goal	WVU 13–7
3	12:54	WVU	David Sills 33-yard pass from Grier (Staley kick)	WVU 20–7
3	8:09	WVU	Gary Jennings Jr. 28-yard pass from Grier (Staley kick)	WVU 27–7
3	6:09	TENN	Tim Jordan 6-yard run (Cimaglia kick)	WVU 27–14
3	1:15	WVU	Kennedy McKoy 14-yard pass from Grier (Conversion failed)	WVU 33–14
4	2:02	WVU	Sills 10-yard pass from Grier (Staley kick)	WVU 40–14

=== ETSU ===
Team	1	2	3	4	Total
ETSU	0	0	3	0	3
• Tennessee	10	28	7	14	59

- Location: Knoxville, Tennessee
- Game start: 4:00 p.m.
- Elapsed time: 3:52
- Game attendance: 96,464
- Game weather: Temperature: 90 °F (32 °C) • Wind: 8 mph (13 km/h) • Weather: Partly cloudy
- Referee: Matt Austin
- TV announcers (SECN): Taylor Zarzour (play-by-play), Matt Stinchcomb (color), Kris Budden (sidelines)

Scoring summary
1	9:32	TENN	Brent Cimaglia 26-yard field goal	TENN 3–0
1	2:49	TENN	Marquill Osborne 8-yard blocked punt return (Cimaglia kick)	TENN 10–0
2	9:27	TENN	Jeremy Banks 1-yard run (Cimaglia kick)	TENN 17–0
2	9:12	TENN	Banks 3-yard run (Cimaglia kick)	TENN 24–0
2	7:41	TENN	Darrin Kirkland Jr. 33-yard interception return (Cimaglia kick)	TENN 31–0
2	9:27	TENN	Josh Palmer 20-yard run (Cimaglia kick)	TENN 38–0
3	13:34	TENN	Jordan Murphy 30-yard pass from Keller Chryst (Cimaglia kick)	TENN 45–0
3	3:20	ETSU	J.J. Jerman 39-yard field goal	TENN 45–3
4	13:34	TENN	Murphy 50-yard pass from Chryst (Cimaglia kick)	TENN 52–3
4	3:20	TENN	Madre London 4-yard run (Cimaglia kick)	TENN 59–3

=== UTEP ===
Team	1	2	3	4	Total
UTEP	0	0	0	0	0
• Tennessee	3	7	7	7	24

- Location: Knoxville, Tennessee
- Game start: Noon
- Elapsed time: 3:04
- Game attendance: 87,074
- Game weather: Temperature: 85 °F (29 °C) • Wind: 12 mph (19 km/h) • Weather: Partly cloudy
- Referee: Steve Marlowe
- TV announcers (SECN): Dave Neal (play-by-play), D. J. Shockley (color), Dawn Davenport (sidelines)

Scoring summary
1	2:39	TENN	Brent Cimaglia 38-yard field goal	TENN 3–0
2	10:49	TENN	Tim Jordan 3-yard run (Cimaglia kick)	TENN 10–0
3	13:49	TENN	Ty Chandler 81-yard run (Cimaglia kick)	TENN 17–0
4	11:14	TENN	Jauan Jennings 4-yard pass from Jarrett Guarantano (Cimaglia kick)	TENN 24–0

=== Florida ===
Team	1	2	3	4	Total
• Florida	14	12	7	14	47
Tennessee	0	3	10	8	21

- Location: Knoxville, Tennessee
- Game start: 7:00 p.m.
- Elapsed time: 3:26
- Game attendance: 100,027
- Game weather: Temperature: 85 °F (29 °C) • Wind: 3 mph (4.8 km/h) • Weather: Partly cloudy
- Referee: James Carter
- TV announcers (ESPN): Adam Amin (play-by-play), Rod Gilmore (color), Quint Kessenich (sidelines)

Scoring summary
1	6:50	UF	R.J. Raymond 1-yard pass from Feleipe Franks (Evan McPherson kick)	UF 7–0
1	4:52	UF	Franks 1-yard run (McPherson kick)	UF 14–0
2	13:13	TENN	Brent Cimaglia 32-yard field goal	UF 14–3
2	11:03	UF	Cece Jefferson safety	UF 16–3
2	10:42	UF	Freddie Swain 65-yard pass from Franks (McPherson kick)	UF 23–3
2	0:15	UF	McPherson 25-yard field goal	UF 26–3
3	14:44	UF	Jordan Scarlett 19-yard run (McPherson kick)	UF 33–3
3	12:38	TENN	Cimaglia 41-yard field goal	UF 33–6
3	1:22	TENN	Madre London 1-yard run (Cimaglia kick)	UF 33–13
4	13:17	UF	Tyrie Cleveland 38-yard pass from Franks (McPherson kick)	UF 40–13
4	10:50	TENN	Jeremy Banks 2-yard run (Jauan Jennings pass from Keller Chryst)	UF 40–21
4	4:54	UF	Dameon Pierce 47-yard run (McPherson kick)	UF 47–21

=== At No. 2 Georgia ===
Team	1	2	3	4	Total
Tennessee	0	0	6	6	12
• No. 2 Georgia	7	10	7	14	38

- Location: Athens, Georgia
- Game start: 3:30 p.m.
- Elapsed time: 3:10
- Game attendance: 92,746
- Game weather: Temperature: 85 °F (29 °C) • Wind: 3 mph (4.8 km/h) • Weather: Partly cloudy
- Referee: John McDaid
- TV announcers (CBS): Brad Nessler (play-by-play), Gary Danielson (color), Jamie Erdahl (sidelines)

Scoring summary
1	8:52	UGA	Isaac Nauta 31-yard run (Rodrigo Blankenship kick)	UGA 7–0
2	11:57	UGA	Blankenship 43-yard field goal	UGA 10–0
2	:30	UGA	D'Andre Swift 1-yard run (Blankenship kick)	UGA 17–0
3	9:52	UGA	Justin Fields 12-yard run (Blankenship kick)	UGA 24–0
3	5:14	TENN	Josh Palmer 37-yard pass from Jarrett Guarantano (Conversion failed)	UGA 24–6
4	11:10	TENN	Ty Chandler 35-yard pass from Guarantano (Conversion failed)	UGA 24–12
4	3:31	UGA	Swift 14-yard run (Blankenship kick)	UGA 31–12
4	2:41	UGA	Fields 15-yard run (Blankenship kick)	UGA 38–12

=== At Auburn ===
Team	1	2	3	4	Total
• Tennessee	3	10	14	3	30
No. 21 Auburn	10	7	0	7	24

- Location: Auburn, Alabama
- Game start: Noon
- Elapsed time: 3:30
- Game attendance: 84,589
- Game weather: Temperature: 70 °F (21 °C) • Wind: 6 mph (9.7 km/h) • Weather: Sunny
- Referee: Matt Austin
- TV announcers (SECN): Dave Neal (play-by-play), D. J. Shockley (color), Dawn Davenport (sidelines)

Scoring summary
1	9:44	AUB	Chandler Cox 1-yard run (Anders Carlson kick)	AUB 7–0
1	5:24	TENN	Brent Cimaglia 42-yard field goal	AUB 7–3
1	2:20	AUB	Carlson 20-yard field goal	AUB 10–3
2	10:44	TENN	Ty Chandler 42-yard pass from Jarrett Guarantano (Cimaglia kick)	Tie 10–10
2	3:26	AUB	Anthony Schwartz 76-yard pass from Jarrett Stidham (Carlson kick)	AUB 17–10
2	0:07	TENN	Cimaglia 45-yard field goal	AUB 17–13
3	3:25	TENN	Jauan Jennings 25-yard pass from Guarantano (Cimaglia kick)	TENN 20–17
3	2:34	TENN	Alontae Taylor 8-yard fumble recovery	TENN 27–17
4	9:04	TENN	Cimaglia 20-yard field goal	TENN 30–17
4	0:37	AUB	Seth Williams 14-yard pass from Stidham (Carlson kick)	TENN 30–24

=== Alabama ===
Third Saturday in October

Team	1	2	3	4	Total
• No. 1 Alabama	28	14	16	0	58
Tennessee	0	14	7	0	21

- Location: Knoxville, Tennessee
- Game start: 3:30 p.m.
- Elapsed time: 3:19
- Game attendance: 97,087
- Game weather: Temperature: 64 °F (18 °C) • Wind: 10 mph (16 km/h) • Weather: Mostly cloudy
- Referee: Matt Loeffler
- TV announcers (CBS): Brad Nessler (play-by-play), Gary Danielson (color), Jamie Erdahl (sideline)

Scoring summary
1	10:58	BAMA	Jerry Jeudy 11-yard pass from Tua Tagovailoa (Joseph Bulovas kick)	BAMA 7–0
1	10:35	BAMA	Josh Jacobs 3-yard run (Bulovas kick)	BAMA 14–0
1	8:08	BAMA	Jaylen Waddle 77-yard pass from Tagovailoa (Bulovas kick)	BAMA 21–0
1	3:31	BAMA	Damien Harris 3-yard run (Bulovas kick)	BAMA 28–0
2	7:21	TENN	Ty Chandler 10-yard pass from Keller Chryst (Brent Cimaglia kick)	BAMA 28–7
2	4:23	BAMA	Jacobs 2-yard run (Bulovas kick)	BAMA 35–7
2	2:18	TENN	Tyler Byrd 20-yard pass from Chryst (Cimaglia kick)	BAMA 35–14
2	0:15	BAMA	Irv Smith 9-yard pass from Tagovailoa (Bulovas kick)	BAMA 42–14
3	14:52	BAMA	Safety	BAMA 44–14
3	12:53	BAMA	Henry Ruggs 28-yard pass from Tagovailoa (Bulovas kick)	BAMA 51–14
3	5:17	TENN	Kyle Phillips 28-yard interception return (Cimaglia kick)	BAMA 51–21
3	1:03	BAMA	Jalen Hurts 21-yard run (Bulovas kick)	BAMA 58–21

=== At South Carolina ===
Team	1	2	3	4	Total
Tennessee	7	7	10	0	24
• South Carolina	3	6	15	3	27

- Location: Columbia, South Carolina

Scoring summary

=== Charlotte ===
Team	1	2	3	4	Total
Charlotte	0	3	0	0	3
• Tennessee	14	0	0	0	14

- Location: Knoxville, Tennessee
- Game start: 4:00 p.m.
- Elapsed time: 3:00
- Game attendance: 86,753
- Game weather: Temperature: 58 °F (14 °C) • Wind: 5 mph (8.0 km/h) • Weather: Sunny
- Referee: Steve Marlowe
- TV announcers (SECN Alt): Mike Morgan (play-by-play), Barrett Jones (color), Taylor Davis (sidelines)

Scoring summary
1	7:42	TENN	Marquez Callaway 82-yard punt return (Brent Cimaglia kick)	TENN 7–0
1	0:17	TENN	Josh Palmer 16-yard pass from Jarrett Guarantano (Cimaglia kick)	TENN 14–0
2	0:17	CHAR	Jonathan Cruz 28-yard field goal	TENN 14–3

=== Kentucky ===
Team	1	2	3	4	Total
No. 12 Kentucky	0	0	7	0	7
• Tennessee	3	14	7	0	24

- Location: Knoxville, Tennessee
- Game start: 3:30 pm
- Elapsed time: 3:12
- Game attendance: 95,258
- Game weather: Temperature: 45 °F (7 °C) • Wind: 6 mph (9.7 km/h) • Weather: Sunny
- Referee: Matt Loeffler
- TV announcers (SECN): John Congemi (play-by-play), Taylor Zarzour (color), Kris Budden (sidelines)

Scoring summary
1	5:09	TENN	Brent Cimaglia 19-yard field goal	TENN 3–0
2	3:05	TENN	Tim Jordan 3-yard run (Cimaglia kick)	TENN 10–0
2	0:00	TENN	Marquez Callaway 39-yard pass from Jarrett Guarantano (Cimaglia kick)	TENN 17–0
3	7:49	TENN	Dominick Wood-Anderson 2-yard pass from Guarantano (Cimaglia kick)	TENN 24–0
3	1:56	UK	C.J. Conrad 19-yard pass from Terry Wilson (Chance Poore kick)	TENN 24–7

=== Missouri ===
Team	1	2	3	4	Total
• Missouri	6	20	14	10	50
Tennessee	0	10	7	0	17

- Location: Knoxville, Tennessee

Scoring summary

=== At Vanderbilt ===
Team	1	2	3	4	Total
Tennessee	0	0	7	6	13
• Vanderbilt	7	10	0	21	38

- Location: Nashville, Tennessee
- Game weather: Temperature: 63 °F (17 °C) • Wind: 8 mph (13 km/h) • Weather: Partly cloudy
- Referee: Marc Curles

Scoring summary
