= 2002 Minnesota Golden Gophers football team =

American college football season

2002 Minnesota Golden Gophers football

Music City Bowl champion

Music City Bowl, W 29–14 vs. Arkansas
- Conference: Big Ten Conference
- Record: 8–5 (3–5 Big Ten)
- Head coach: Glen Mason (6th season)
- Co-offensive coordinators: Mitch Browning (3rd season); Tony Petersen (3rd season)
- Defensive coordinator: Moe Ankney (2nd season)
- Captains: Asad Abdul-Khaliq; Michael Lehan
- Home stadium: Hubert H. Humphrey Metrodome

2002 Big Ten Conference football standings
	Conf.			Overall
Team	W		L	W		L
No. 1 Ohio State $#+	8	–	0	14	–	0
No. 8 Iowa %+	8	–	0	11	–	2
No. 9 Michigan	6	–	2	10	–	3
No. 16 Penn State	5	–	3	9	–	4
Purdue	4	–	4	7	–	6
Illinois	4	–	4	5	–	7
Minnesota	3	–	5	8	–	5
Wisconsin	2	–	6	8	–	6
Michigan State	2	–	6	4	–	8
Northwestern	1	–	7	3	–	9
Indiana	1	–	7	3	–	9
# – BCS National Champion; $ – BCS representative as conference champion; % – BCS at-large representative; + – Conference co-champions; Rankings from AP Poll

The 2002 Minnesota Golden Gophers football team represented the University of Minnesota as a member of the Big Ten Conference during the 2002 NCAA Division I-A football season. In their sixth year under head coach Glen Mason, the Golden Gophers compiled an overall record of 8–5 with a mark of 3–5 in conference play, placing seventh in the Big Ten and outscored opponents 376 to 319. Minnesota was invited to the Music City Bowl, where the Golden Gophers defeated Arkansas. The team played home games at the Hubert H. Humphrey Metrodome in Minneapolis.

Redshirt freshman defensive end Brandon Hall was shot and killed on September 1, 2002, in downtown Minneapolis after a fight that involved teammates and other individuals. Hall's killer was convicted in his murder.

== Schedule ==
Date	Time	Opponent	Rank	Site	TV	Result	Attendance
August 31	6:00 pm	SW Texas State*		Hubert H. Humphrey Metrodome; Minneapolis, MN		W 42–0	32,209
September 7	7:00 pm	at Louisiana–Lafayette*		Cajun Field; Lafayette, LA	ESPN Plus	W 35–11	20,512
September 14	1:30 pm	Toledo*		Hubert H. Humphrey Metrodome; Minneapolis, MN		W 31–21	36,640
September 21	1:30 pm	Buffalo*		Hubert H. Humphrey Metrodome; Minneapolis, MN		W 42–17	34,294
September 28	5:00 pm	at Purdue		Ross–Ade Stadium; West Lafayette, IN	ESPN2	L 15–28	56,839
October 3	7:00 pm	Illinois		Hubert H. Humphrey Metrodome; Minneapolis, MN	ESPN2	W 31–10	32,663
October 10	7:00 pm	Northwestern		Hubert H. Humphrey Metrodome; Minneapolis, MN		W 45–42	37,729
October 19	11:00 am	at Michigan State		Spartan Stadium; East Lansing, MI	ESPN Plus	W 28–7	74,232
November 2	2:30 pm	at No. 6 Ohio State	No. 23	Ohio Stadium; Columbus, OH	ABC	L 3–34	104,897
November 9	6:45 pm	No. 13 Michigan		Hubert H. Humphrey Metrodome; Minneapolis, MN (Little Brown Jug)	ESPN	L 24–41	53,773
November 16	11:00 am	No. 6 Iowa		Hubert H. Humphrey Metrodome; Minneapolis, MN (rivalry)	ESPN	L 21–45	65,184
November 23	11:00 am	at Wisconsin		Camp Randall Stadium; Madison, WI (rivalry)	ESPN	L 31–49	78,843
December 30	1:00 pm	vs. No. 25 Arkansas*		Adelphia Coliseum; Nashville, TN (Music City Bowl)	ESPN	W 29–14	39,183
*Non-conference game; Rankings from AP Poll released prior to the game; All times are in Central time

== Roster ==
2002 Minnesota Golden Gophers football team roster
Players
Coaches
Offense

Pos.	#	Name	Class
QB	8	Asad Abdul-Khaliq	Jr
RB	21	Marion Barber III	So
G	68	Mark Setterstrom	Fr
TE	89	Matt Spaeth	Fr
FB	44	Thomas Tapeh	Jr
TE	82	Ben Utecht	Jr

Defense

Pos.	#	Name	Class
CB	39	Michael Lehan	Sr
DT	95	Anthony Montgomery	Fr
DT	51	Darrell Reid	So
SS	27	Eli Ward	Jr
LB	42	Eric Washington	Fr
LB	59	Ben West	Jr
DB	6	Quentin White	Fr
CB	35	Mike Wojciechowski	So

Special teams

Pos.	#	Name	Class

Head coach

- Glen Mason

Coordinators/assistant coaches

Legend

- (C) Team captain
- (S) Suspended
- (I) Ineligible
- Injured
- Redshirt

Roster

== Team players in the NFL ==
Player	Position	Round	Pick	NFL club
Michael Lehan	Cornerback	5	152	Cleveland Browns
