= 2021 Music City Bowl =

Postseason college football bowl game

2021 TransPerfect Music City Bowl
- 23rd Music City Bowl
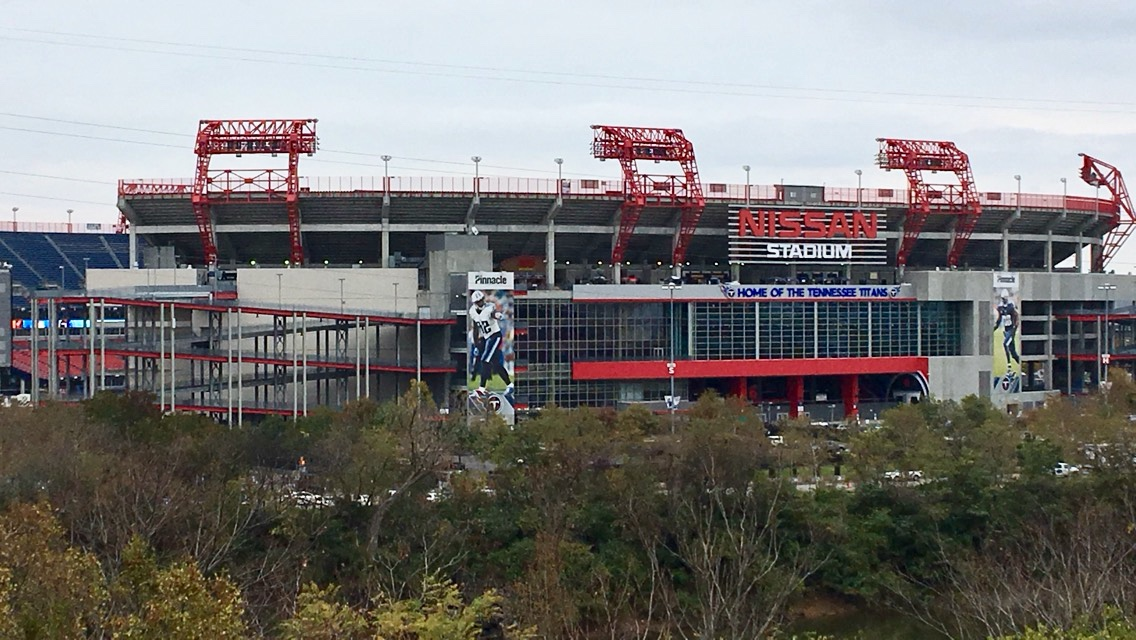
- Nissan Stadium in Nashville, Tennessee, hosted the Music City Bowl.
Purdue Boilermakers	Tennessee Volunteers
(8–4)	(7–5)
Big Ten	SEC
48	45
Head coach: Jeff Brohm	Head coach: Josh Heupel
	1	2	3	4	OT	Total
Purdue	7	16	7	15	3	48
Tennessee	21	0	10	14	0	45
- Date: December 30, 2021
- Season: 2021
- Stadium: Nissan Stadium
- Location: Nashville, Tennessee
- MVP: Broc Thompson (WR, Purdue)
- Favorite: Tennessee by 3
- Referee: Jerry Magallanes (ACC)
- Attendance: 69,489

United States TV coverage
- Network: ESPN; ESPN Radio
- Announcers: ESPN: Tom Hart (play-by-play), Jordan Rodgers (color), and Cole Cubelic (sidelines); ESPN Radio: Dave Neal (play-by-play), Deuce McAllister (analyst), and Andraya Carter (sideline)

International TV coverage
- Network: ESPN Brazil
- Announcers: Renan do Couto (play-by-play) and Weinny Eirado (analyst)

The 2021 Music City Bowl was a college football bowl game played on December 30, 2021, with kickoff at 3:00 p.m. EST (2:00 p.m. local CST) and televised on ESPN. It was the 23rd edition of the Music City Bowl (after the 2020 edition was cancelled due to the COVID-19 pandemic), and was one of the 2021–22 bowl games concluding the 2021 FBS football season. Sponsored by translation and language services company TransPerfect, the game was officially known as the TransPerfect Music City Bowl.

== Teams ==
The game was played between Tennessee from the Southeastern Conference (SEC) and Purdue from the Big Ten Conference. The game was the second meeting between the schools; the first was the 1979 Astro-Bluebonnet Bowl, which Purdue won by a score of 27–22.

=== Purdue Boilermakers ===
The Boilermakers entered the bowl with an 8–4 record (6–3 in conference), including an away upset win against No. 2 Iowa by seventeen points on October 16, and a home upset win against No. 3 Michigan State by 11 points. The Boilermakers finished in a three-way tie for second place of the Big Ten's West Division. This was Purdue's second Music City Bowl; their 2018 team lost that season's Music City Bowl to Auburn, 63–14. The Boilermakers had not made a bowl appearance since, but this was Purdue's 20th overall bowl game in program history.

=== Tennessee Volunteers ===
Tennessee entered the bowl with a 7–5 record (4–4 in conference), including an away upset win against No. 18 Kentucky by three points on November 6. The Volunteers finished in third place in the SEC's East Division. This was Tennessee's third Music City Bowl; they lost in 2010 to North Carolina, 27–30, but won in 2016 over Nebraska, 38–24. This was the 54th overall bowl game for the Volunteers program.

== Game summary ==
2021 TransPerfect Music City Bowl

Quarter	1	2	3	4	OT	Total
Tennessee	21	0	10	14	0	45
Purdue	7	16	7	15	3	48

at Nissan Stadium • Nashville, Tennessee

- Date: Thursday, December 30, 2021
- Game time: 2:00 p.m. CST
- Game weather: Cloudy • Temperature: 57 °F (14 °C) • Wind: 0 mph S
- Game attendance: 69,489
- TV announcers (ESPN): Tom Hart (play-by-play), Jordan Rodgers (color), and Cole Cubelic (sidelines)

Scoring summary

Quarter	Time	Drive			Team	Scoring information	Score	
Quarter	Time	Plays	Yards	TOP	Team	Scoring information	Tennessee	Purdue
1	10:28	4	56	0:44	Tennessee	Cedric Tillman 41-yard touchdown reception from Hendon Hooker, Chase McGrath kick good	7	0
1	10:15	1	75	0:13	Purdue	Broc Thompson 75-yard touchdown reception from Aidan O'Connell, Mitchell Fineran kick good	7	7
1	6:31	2	63	0:27	Tennessee	Cedric Tillman 61-yard touchdown reception from Hendon Hooker, Chase McGrath kick good	14	7
1	3:29	8	80	2:14	Tennessee	Jabari Small 2-yard touchdown run, Chase McGrath kick good	21	7
2	14:01	10	68	4:28	Purdue	24-yard field goal by Mitchell Fineran	21	10
2	9:42	9	69	2:59	Purdue	36-yard field goal by Mitchell Fineran	21	13
2	1:03	8	52	2:33	Purdue	29-yard field goal by Mitchell Fineran	21	16
2	0:19	2	28	0:10	Purdue	Payne Durham 2-yard touchdown reception from Aidan O'Connell, Mitchell Fineran kick good	21	23
3	12:45	7	71	2:15	Tennessee	Velus Jones Jr. 15-yard touchdown reception from Hendon Hooker, Chase McGrath kick good	28	23
3	9:04	9	75	3:41	Purdue	TJ Sheffield 10-yard touchdown reception from Aidan O'Connell, Mitchell Fineran kick good	28	30
3	3:44	5	36	2:01	Tennessee	30-yard field goal by Chase McGrath	31	30
4	4:58	3	90	1:02	Purdue	Payne Durham 62-yard touchdown reception from Aidan O'Connell, 2-point pass good	31	38
4	3:37	5	65	1:21	Tennessee	Cedric Tillman 13-yard touchdown reception from Hendon Hooker, Chase McGrath kick good	38	38
4	2:57	3	75	0:40	Purdue	Broc Thompson 70-yard touchdown reception from Aiden O'Connell, Mitchell Fineran kick good	38	45
4	1:35	4	72	1:22	Tennessee	Jalin Hyatt 2-yard touchdown reception from Hendon Hooker, Chase McGrath kick good	45	45
OT		4	4		Purdue	39-yard field goal by Mitchell Fineran	45	48
"TOP" = time of possession. For other American football terms, see Glossary of American football.								

== Statistics ==
=== Team statistics ===
Team statistical comparison
Statistic	Tennessee	Purdue
First downs	30	26
First downs rushing	16	4
First downs passing	11	15
First downs penalty	3	7
Third down efficiency	8–20	6–16
Fourth down efficiency	2–6	0–1
Total plays–net yards	103–663	81–627
Rushing attempts–net yards	62–285	33–93
Yards per rush	4.6	2.8
Yards passing	378	534
Pass completions–attempts	26–41	26–48
Interceptions thrown	0	3
Punt returns–total yards	2–(−6)	2–2
Kickoff returns–total yards	8–190	0–0
Punts–average yardage	6–43.3	5–41.0
Fumbles–lost	4–1	3–0
Penalties–yards	14–128	5–61
Time of possession	29:53	30:07

=== Individual statistics ===
Tennessee statistics
Volunteers passing
	C–A	Yds	TD–INT
Hendon Hooker	26–41	378	5–0
Volunteers rushing
	Car	Yds	TD
Jabari Small	26	180	1
Hendon Hooker	19	62	0
Jaylen Wright	17	54	0
TEAM	1	−8	0
Volunteers receiving
	Rec	Yds	TD
Cedric Tillman	7	150	3
Velus Jones Jr.	10	85	1
Princeton Fant	3	71	0
Jalin Hyatt	3	35	1
JaVonta Payton	2	35	0
Jabari Small	1	2	0

Purdue statistics
Boilermakers passing
	C–A	Yds	TD–INT
Aidan O'Connell	26–47	534	5–3
Jackson Anthrop	0–1	0	0–0
Boilermakers rushing
	Car	Yds	TD
Zander Horvath	17	58	0
King Doerue	10	45	0
Jackson Anthrop	2	2	0
Deion Burks	1	−3	0
Aidan O'Connell	3	−9	0
Boilermakers receiving
	Rec	Yds	TD
Broc Thompson	7	217	2
Payne Durham	5	85	2
Jackson Anthrop	5	74	0
T.J. Sheffield	3	61	1
Deion Burks	1	26	0
Garrett Miller	1	25	0
Dylan Downing	1	21	0
Zander Horvath	2	21	0
Collin Sullivan	1	4	0
