= J. T. Shrout =

American football player (born 1999)

No. 5
- Position: Quarterback

Personal information
- Born: October 22, 1999 (age 27); Santa Clarita, California, U.S.
- Listed height: 6 ft 3 in (1.91 m)
- Listed weight: 215 lb (98 kg)

Career information
- High school: Hart (Santa Clarita)
- College: Tennessee (2018–2020); Colorado (2021–2022); Arkansas State (2023)
- Stats at ESPN

Jacob Tyler Shrout (born October 22, 1999) is an American former college football quarterback. He played for the Tennessee Volunteers, the Colorado Buffaloes and the Arkansas State Red Wolves.

== Early life ==
Shrout grew up in Santa Clarita, California, and attended William S. Hart High School. He was rated a three-star recruit and originally committed to play college football for the California Golden Bears but later committed to play for the Tennessee Volunteers over offers from Ball State, Colorado State, Hawaii, Montana State, San Diego State, San Jose State, UNLV and Weber State.

== College career ==
=== Tennessee ===
Shrout redshirted during his true freshman season in 2018 and did not see action. During his redshirt freshman season in 2019, he appeared in four games and started in one of them finishing that season with completing 13 out of 27 passing attempts for 179 yards and a touchdown. During the 2020 season, he played in four games and finished the season with completing 24 out of 42 passing attempts for 315 yards and four touchdowns. On December 22, Shrout announced that he had entered the transfer portal. On December 27, he announced that he would be transferring to Colorado.

=== Colorado ===
Shrout did not see any game action in the 2021 season due to a knee injury that had required surgery during the second week of fall camp which had him miss out the entire season. During the 2022 season, he played in 9 games and finished the season with completing 90 passes for 1,220 yards, seven touchdowns and eight interceptions. On January 17, 2023, Shrout announced that he would be entering the transfer portal. On January 30, 2023, he announced that he would be transferring to Arkansas State.

=== Arkansas State ===
On August 29, 2023, Red Wolves head coach, Butch Jones announced that Shrout would be the starting quarterback for the team.

=== Statistics ===
| Year | Team | Games | | | Passing | | | | | | | | Rushing | | | |
| Year | Team | GP | GS | Record | Comp | Att | Pct | Yards | Avg | TD | Int | Rate | Att | Yards | Avg | TD |
|---|---|---|---|---|---|---|---|---|---|---|---|---|---|---|---|---|
| 2018 | Tennessee | Redshirt (redshirt) | | | | | | | | | | | | | | |
| 2019 | Tennessee | 4 | 1 | 1–0 | 13 | 27 | 48.1 | 179 | 6.6 | 1 | 0 | 116.1 | 3 | 4 | 1.3 | 0 |
| 2020 | Tennessee | 4 | 0 | 0–0 | 24 | 42 | 57.1 | 315 | 7.5 | 4 | 3 | 137.3 | 8 | 4 | 0.5 | 0 |
| 2021 | Colorado | DNP | | | | | | | | | | | | | | |
| 2022 | Colorado | 9 | 7 | 0–7 | 90 | 203 | 44.3 | 1,220 | 6.0 | 7 | 8 | 98.3 | 30 | −15 | −0.5 | 1 |
| 2023 | Arkansas State | 2 | 2 | 0–2 | 24 | 51 | 47.1 | 227 | 4.5 | 0 | 2 | 76.6 | 4 | −12 | −3.0 | 0 |
| Career | | 19 | 10 | 1–9 | 151 | 323 | 46.7 | 1,941 | 6.0 | 12 | 13 | 101.4 | 45 | -19 | -0.4 | 1 |

== Personal life ==
Shrout married former Alabama softball catcher Ally Shipman on July 6, 2024.
