= 2002 Music City Bowl =

2002 Gaylord Hotels Music City Bowl
- 5th Music City Bowl
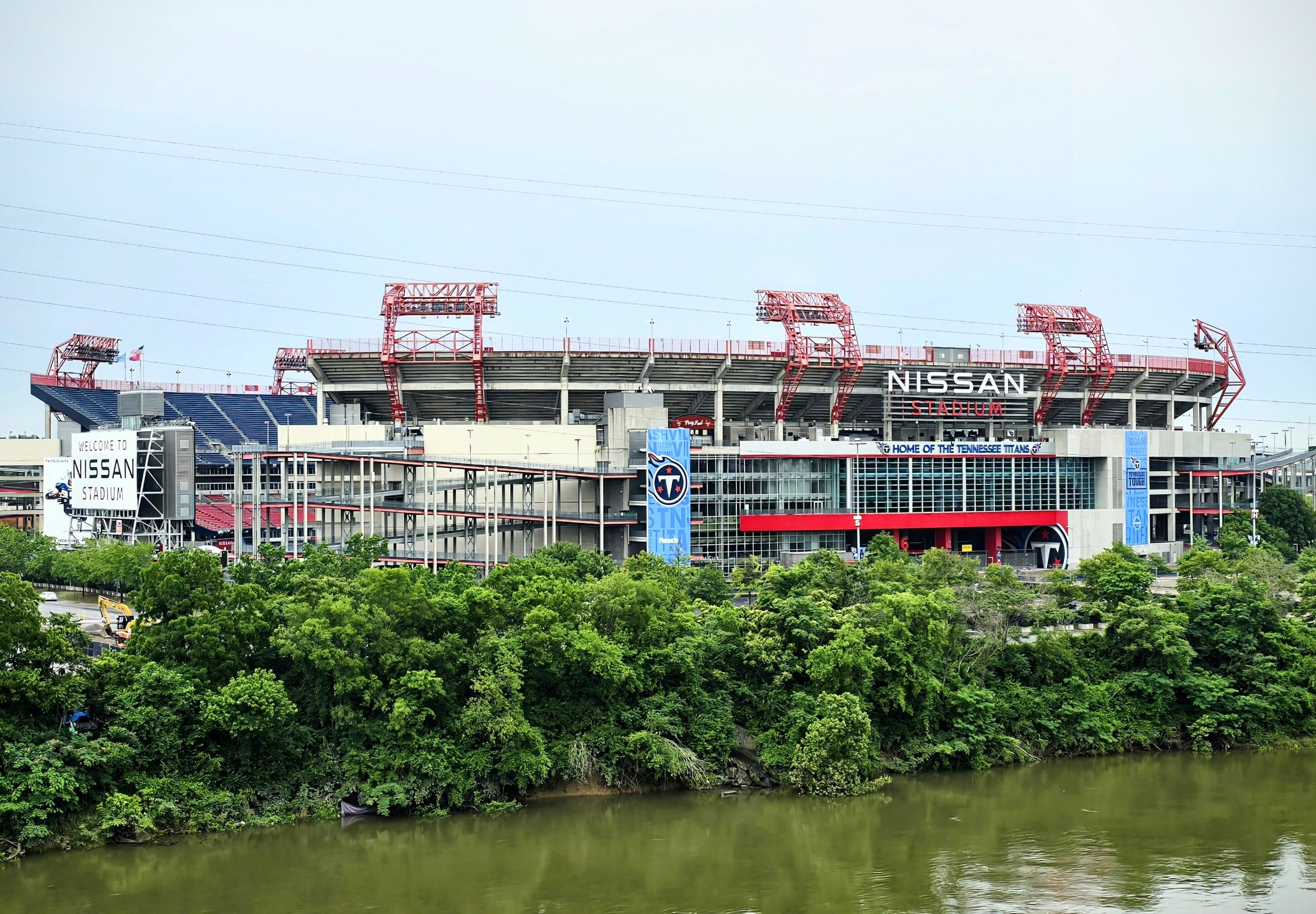
- The Coliseum in Nashville, Tennessee, hosted the Music City Bowl.
Arkansas Razorbacks	Minnesota Golden Gophers
(9–4)	(7–5)
SEC	Big Ten
14	29
Head coach: Houston Nutt	Head coach: Glen Mason
AP / Coaches / BCS; 25 / NR / NR
	1	2	3	4	Total
Arkansas	7	0	0	7	14
Minnesota	6	6	7	10	29
- Date: December 30, 2002
- Season: 2002
- Stadium: The Coliseum
- Location: Nashville, Tennessee
- MVP: K Dan Nystrom, Minnesota
- Favorite: Minnesota by 8.5
- Referee: Dan Blum (C-USA)
- Attendance: 39,183
- Payout: US$750,000 per team

United States TV coverage
- Network: ESPN
- Announcers: Mark Jones, Bob Davie, and Holly Rowe

The 2002 Music City Bowl was the fifth edition of the bowl game. It was played at LP Field in Nashville, Tennessee on December 30, 2002, and featured the Arkansas Razorbacks and the Minnesota Golden Gophers. Sponsored by Gaylord Hotels, it was officially named the Gaylord Hotels Music City Bowl.

== Game recap ==
Arkansas started the game with a 2-yard touchdown pass from quarterback Matt Jones to wide receiver George Wilson. Kicker Dan Nystrom got Minnesota on the board with a 24-yard field goal. He added another 45-yard field goal to make the score 7–6. In the second quarter, he added field goals of 21 and 22 yards, as Minnesota took a 12–6 halftime lead.

Quarterback Asad Abdul-Khaliq threw a 19-yard touchdown pass to tight end Ben Utecht for a 19–9 lead. In the fourth quarter, Nystrom added his fifth field goal of the game to put the Gophers ahead 22–7. Thomas Tapeh rushed for a 33-yard touchdown as Minnesota built a 29–7 lead. Ryan Sorahan threw a touchdown pass to Richard Smith to cut the lead to 29–14.

With the win, the Golden Gophers won their first bowl game since 1985.

The attendance of 39,183 is (as of 2017) the lowest attendance for any Music City Bowl.
