= Cedric Tillman (American football, born 2000) =

American football player (born 2000)

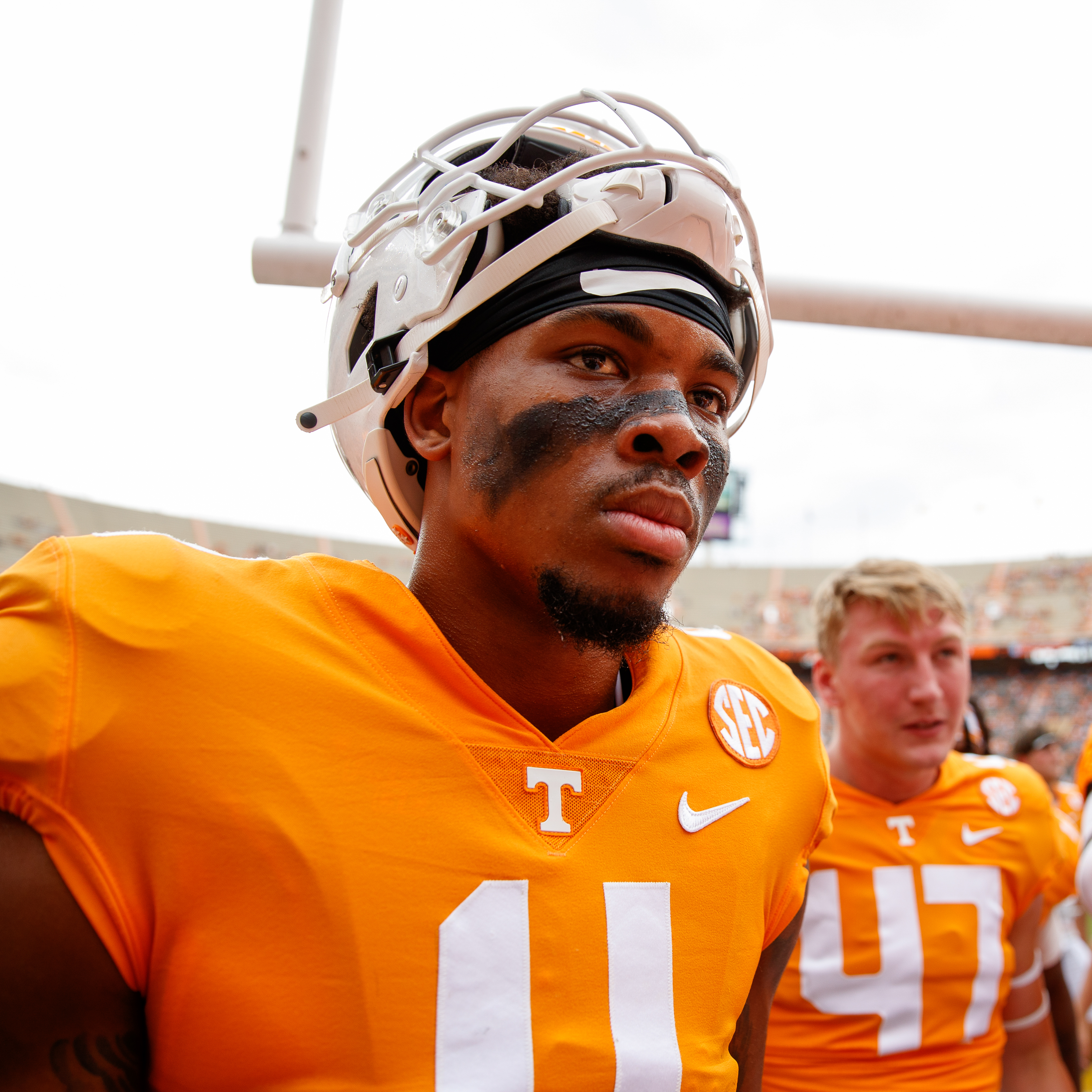
- Tillman with the Tennessee Volunteers in 2021

No. 13 – New Orleans Saints
- Position: Wide receiver
- Roster status: Active

Personal information
- Born: April 19, 2000 (age 26); Las Vegas, Nevada, U.S.
- Listed height: 6 ft 3 in (1.91 m)
- Listed weight: 215 lb (98 kg)

Career information
- High school: Bishop Gorman (Las Vegas)
- College: Tennessee (2018–2022)
- NFL draft: 2023: 3rd round, 74th overall pick

Career history
- Cleveland Browns (2023–2025); New Orleans Saints (2026–present)

Career NFL statistics as of 2026
- Receptions: 71
- Receiving yards: 833
- Receiving touchdowns: 5
- Stats at Pro Football Reference

Cedric Jashon Tillman (born April 19, 2000) is an American professional football wide receiver for the New Orleans Saints of the National Football League (NFL). He played college football for the Tennessee Volunteers and was selected by the Cleveland Browns in the third round of the 2023 NFL draft.

== Early life ==
Tillman attended Bishop Gorman High School in Las Vegas, Nevada and was rated as a three-star prospect during his recruitment, according to 247Sports. In February 2018, Tillman committed to the University of Tennessee to play college football.

== College career ==
Tillman played at Tennessee from 2018 to 2022 under head coaches Jeremy Pruitt and Josh Heupel.

From 2018 to 2020 at Tennessee, Tillman was a backup receiver and had eight receptions for 124 yards and two touchdowns. He redshirted as a freshman in 2018. He scored his first college touchdown on September 14, 2019, in the 45–0 victory over Chattanooga. In the final game of Tennessee's 2020 season, he scored on a 46-yard touchdown reception in a 34–13 loss to Texas A&M.

Tillman became a starter for the first time in 2021. Tillman had his breakout game against longtime rival #4 Alabama with seven catches for 152 receiving yards and a receiving touchdown in the 52–24 loss. His touchdown was a 70-yard reception that helped put the Vols within seven points in the fourth quarter. On November 13, against rival #1 Georgia, he had ten receptions for 200 receiving yards and one touchdown in the 41–17 loss. Tillman was the first Volunteer to record at least 200 receiving yards since Cordarrelle Patterson in 2012. In the regular season finale against in-state rival Vanderbilt, he had his first multi-touchdown game as a Vol in the 45–21 victory. Tennessee earned a spot in the Music City Bowl against Purdue. In the 48–45 overtime loss, he had seven receptions for 150 receiving yards and three receiving touchdowns. He finished the season with 64 receptions for 1,081 yards and 12 touchdowns. His 12 touchdowns ranked third in the SEC.

Tillman returned to Tennessee in 2022, rather than enter the 2022 NFL draft. In Tennessee's second game, against #17 Pitt, he had nine receptions for 162 yards and the go-ahead touchdown in overtime in the 34–27 victory on September 10. Tillman suffered an ankle injury in the following game against Akron that impacted his availability and production for the remainder of the season. Tillman returned against Kentucky on October 29. On November 19, he scored two receiving touchdowns against South Carolina. He finished the season with 37 receptions for 417 receiving yards and three receiving touchdowns in six games. He elected to enter the 2023 NFL draft and not participate in the Orange Bowl.

== Professional career ==
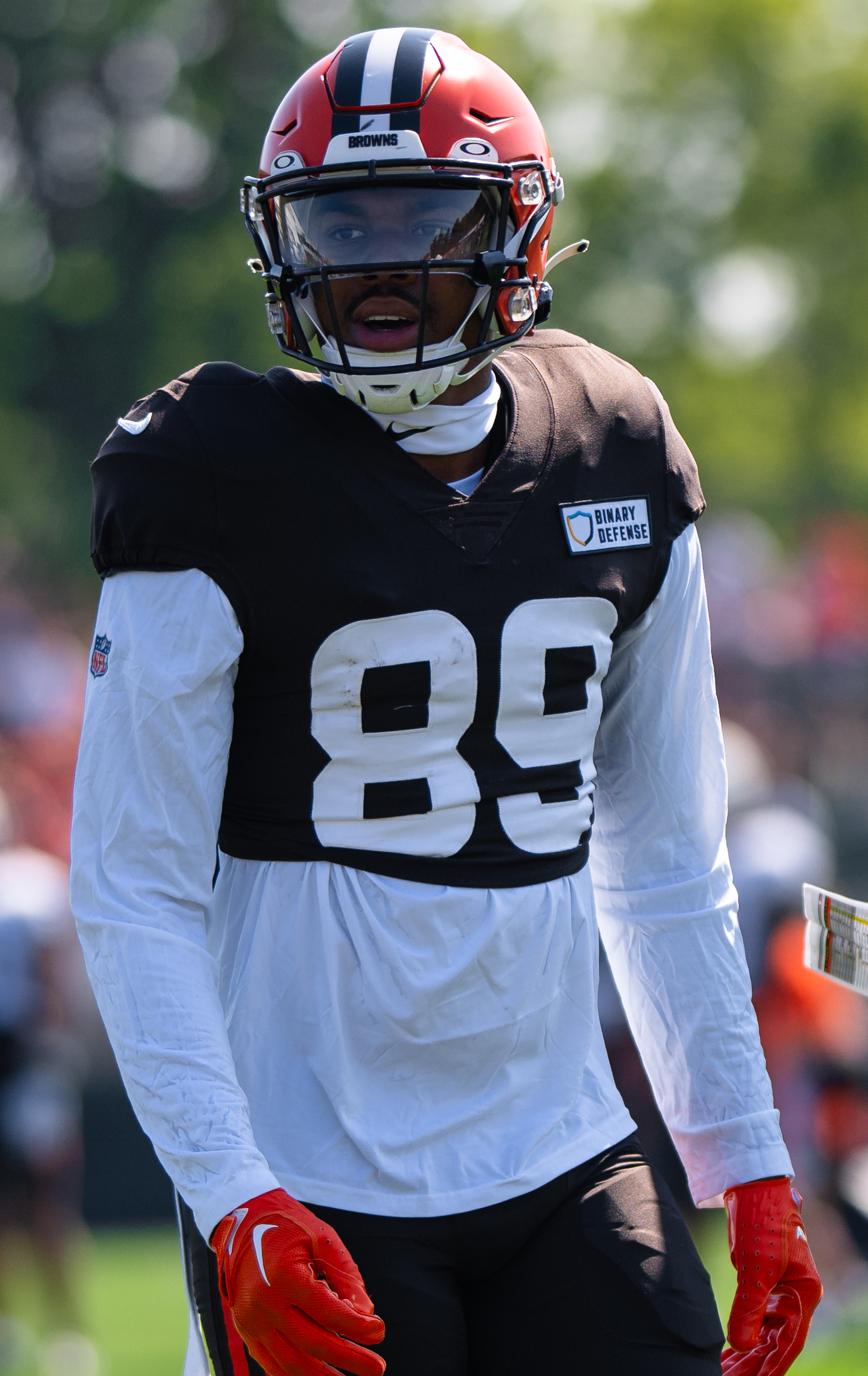
Tillman in 2023

Pre-draft measurables
Height	Weight	Arm length	Hand span	Wingspan	40-yard dash	10-yard split	20-yard split	Three-cone drill	Vertical jump	Broad jump
6 ft 3 3/8 in (1.91 m)	213 lb (97 kg)	32 3/4 in (0.83 m)	10 in (0.25 m)	6 ft 7 1/4 in (2.01 m)	4.54 s	1.53 s	2.64 s	7.32 s	37.0 in (0.94 m)	10 ft 8 in (3.25 m)
All values from NFL Combine/Pro Day

Tillman was selected by the Cleveland Browns in the third round, 74th overall, of the 2023 NFL draft. In his rookie season, Tillman appeared in 14 games and started three. He finished with 21 receptions for 224 receiving yards.

In Week 8 of the 2024 season, Tillman recorded 99 yards and his first two professional touchdowns against the Baltimore Ravens in a 29–24 victory. After suffering a concussion and leaving the game in the Week 12 matchup against the Pittsburgh Steelers, Tillman was ruled out for the team's Week 13 matchup against Denver Broncos. Tillman was placed on injured reserve due to the concussion on December 31, ending his season with 29 receptions for 339 yards and three touchdowns.

On September 29, 2025, head coach Kevin Stefanski announced that Tillman would miss 'weeks' due to a hamstring injury suffered in the team's Week 4 loss to the Detroit Lions. He was activated on November 8, ahead of the team's Week 10 matchup against the New York Jets. He finished the 2025 season with 21 receptions for 270 yards and two touchdowns.

On August 27, 2026, Tillman was waived by the Browns.

=== New Orleans Saints ===
On September 1, 2026, Tillman was signed to the practice squad of the New Orleans Saints. He was activated on October 24.

== Career statistics ==
=== NFL ===
Legend
**Bold**	Career high

Year	Team	Games		Receiving					Rushing					Fumbles	
Year	Team	GP	GS	Rec	Yds	Avg	Lng	TD	Att	Yds	Avg	Lng	TD	Fum	Lost
2023	CLE	14	3	21	224	10.7	23	0	1	8	8.0	8	0	0	0
2024	CLE	11	6	29	339	11.7	38	3	1	-5	-5	-5	0	0	0
2025	CLE	13	10	21	270	12.9	42	2	0	0	0	0	0	0	0
Career		38	19	71	833	11.7	42	5	2	3	1.5	8	0	0	0

=== College ===
Year	G	Rec	Yds	Avg	TD
2018	1	1	−3	−3.0	0
2019	3	4	60	15.0	1
2020	2	3	67	22.3	1
2021	12	64	1,081	16.9	12
2022	6	37	417	11.3	3
Career	24	109	1,622	12.5	17

== Personal life ==
His father, also named Cedric Tillman, played in the NFL for the Denver Broncos and Jacksonville Jaguars.
