= 1999 Music City Bowl =

1999 HomePoint.com Music City Bowl
- 2nd Music City Bowl
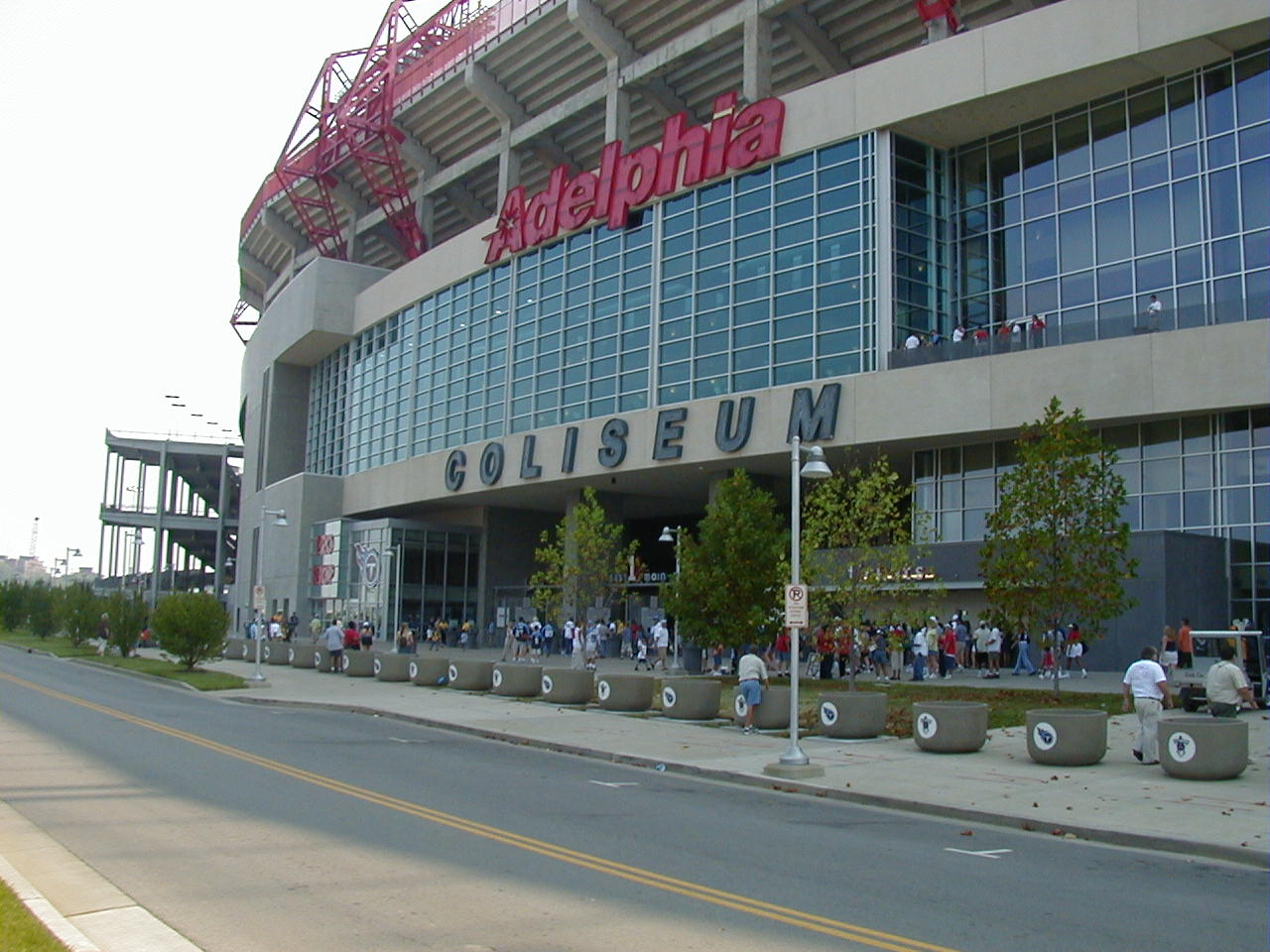
- Adelphia Coliseum in Nashville, Tennessee, hosted the Music City Bowl.
Kentucky Wildcats	Syracuse Orangemen
(6–5)	(6–5)
SEC	Big East
13	20
Head coach: Hal Mumme	Head coach: Paul Pasqualoni
	1	2	3	4	Total
Kentucky	10	0	0	3	13
Syracuse	0	7	0	13	20
- Date: December 29, 1999
- Season: 1999
- Stadium: Adelphia Coliseum (LP Field)
- Location: Nashville, Tennessee
- MVP: RB James Mungro, Syracuse
- Favorite: Kentucky favored by 3
- Halftime show: Kentucky 10, Syracuse 7
- Attendance: 59,221
- Payout: US$750,000 per team

United States TV coverage
- Network: ESPN
- Announcers: Rich Waltz, Gino Torretta, Don McPherson

The 1999 Music City Bowl was a college football postseason game matching the University of Kentucky Wildcats against the Syracuse University Orangemen. Both teams entered the game with 6–5 records, unranked in the polls, though Syracuse had been ranked as high as #16 in the AP poll during the season. Kentucky was favored by 3 points.

Kentucky fielded the opening kickoff and mounted a 79-yard touchdown drive on the game's opening possession. Kentucky's first team All American tight end James Whalen Jr. led the drive with a 45-yard reception and Kendrick Shanklin scored on a 3-yard run. Kentucky's defense forced a punt on Syracuse's first possession and Kentucky drove inside the Syracuse 10-yard line but the drive stalled when Whalen was suddenly lost (for the remainder of the game) to injury, leaving halfway through the first quarter already having four catches for 79 yards. Kentucky settled for a 22-yard field goal kicked by Marc Samuel and led 10–0 at the end of the first quarter after stopping Syracuse with two fumble recoveries and a blocked field goal attempt.

With 1:56 left in the second quarter Syracuse scored on a 2-yard Johnson touchdown run. Neither team scored in the third quarter.

In the fourth quarter a 35-yard field goal put Kentucky up 13–7. Syracuse countered with James Mungro touchdown runs of 32 yards (with 9:08 to play) and 20 yards (with 1:42 to play). Syracuse failed to convert after the second touchdown, leaving them with a 20–13 lead as Kentucky resumed possession on its own 4-yard line with 1:35 remaining and no time outs. Kentucky drove to the Syracuse 41-yard line but the game's final play was an incomplete Hail Mary.

Syracuse finished with 19 first downs to Kentucky's 18 and 404 yards of offense to Kentucky's 365. Syracuse had 276 rushing yards on 47 attempts; Kentucky had 57 on 23 attempts. Kentucky had 308 passing yards to Syracuse's 128; each team fumbled three times with Syracuse losing two and Kentucky losing one. Syracuse's Keith Bullock had 20 tackles; Ryan Murphy had 15 and Marlon McCree 10 for Kentucky.

Syracuse's James Mungro was the game's MVP with 12 rushes for 162 yards and two touchdowns.
