= Ben Utecht =

American football player and singer (born 1981)

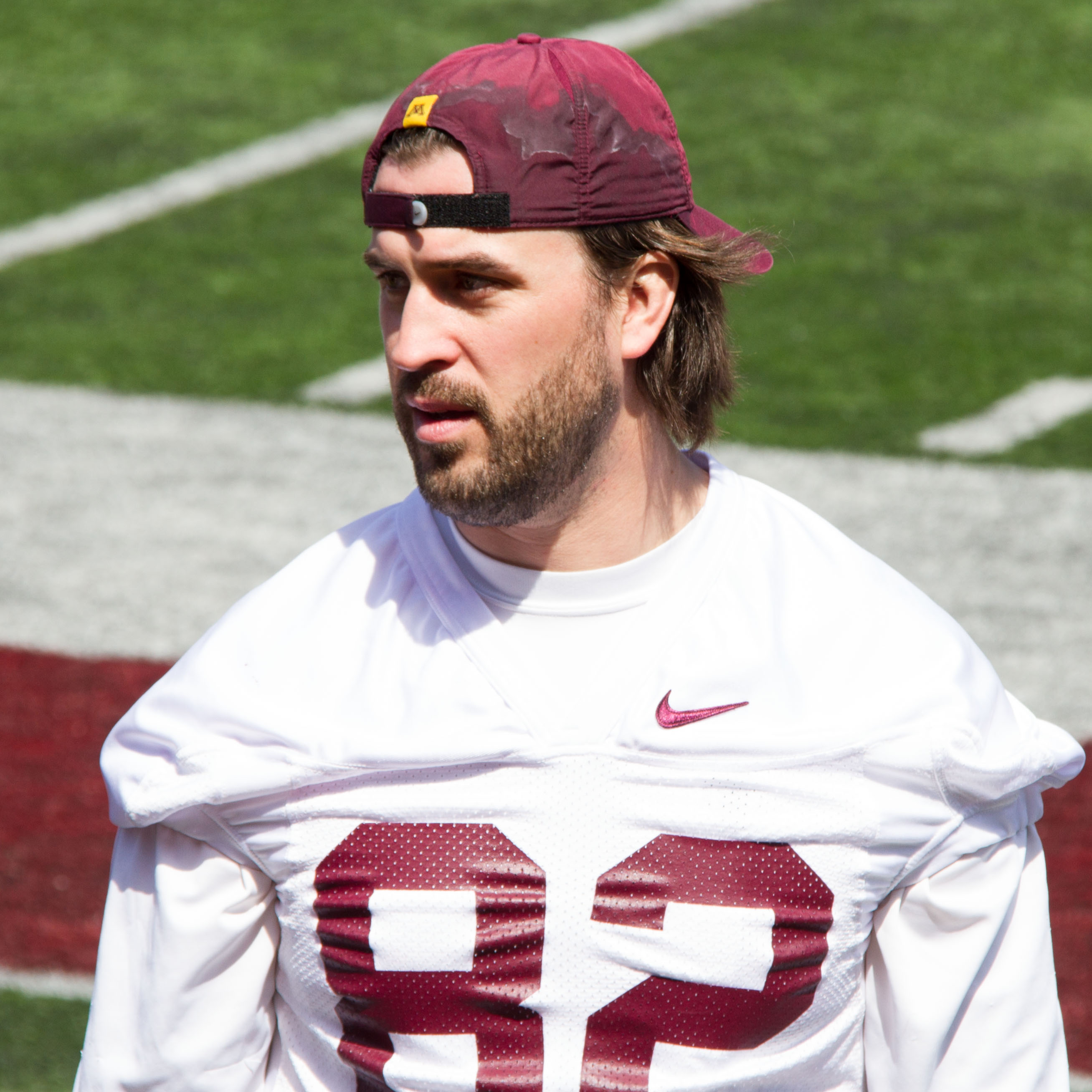
- Utecht at the 2013 Minnesota Gophers Alumni Flag Football Game

No. 47, 81, 86
- Position: Tight end

Personal information
- Born: June 30, 1981 (age 45); Rochester, Minnesota, U.S.
- Listed height: 6 ft 6 in (1.98 m)
- Listed weight: 251 lb (114 kg)

Career information
- High school: Hastings (Hastings, Minnesota)
- College: Minnesota (1999–2003)
- NFL draft: 2004: undrafted

Career history
- Indianapolis Colts (2004–2007); Cincinnati Bengals (2008–2009)

Awards and highlights
- Super Bowl champion (XLI); First-team All-Big Ten (2003); Second-team All-Big Ten (2001)

Career NFL statistics
- Receptions: 87
- Receiving yards: 923
- Receiving touchdowns: 3
- Stats at Pro Football Reference

Benjamin Utecht
- Born: Benjamin Jeffrey Utecht
- Origin: Rochester, Minnesota, United States
- Genre: Classical Pop/Vocal
- Occupation: Singer
- Years active: 2009–present
- Label: Stylos Records

Benjamin Jeffrey Utecht (born June 30, 1981) is an American singer and former professional football player. He played football as a tight end for the Indianapolis Colts and Cincinnati Bengals of the National Football League (NFL). He was signed by the Colts as an undrafted free agent in 2004 after playing college football for the Minnesota Golden Gophers. He earned a Super Bowl ring with the Colts in Super Bowl XLI over the Chicago Bears.

== Early life ==
Utecht graduated from Hastings Senior High School in Hastings, Minnesota where he helped lead the Raiders to a State Semi-Final appearance.

== College career ==
Utecht became a four-year starter at the University of Minnesota, starting 35 of 44 games and playing in the Music City Bowl.

== Professional career ==
=== Indianapolis Colts ===
He signed as a free agent with the Colts on April 30, 2004. Utecht did not see much action in the 2004 and 2005 seasons. His best season was the 2006 season, with 37 receptions for 377 yards. In the 2006 postseason, Utecht had 5 receptions for 41 yards. He would then go on to help the Colts win Super Bowl XLI. In 2007, he caught 31 receptions for 364 yards and a touchdown. Utecht became a restricted free agent in the 2008 offseason.

=== Cincinnati Bengals ===
On March 14, the Cincinnati Bengals signed him to an offer sheet believed to be worth $9 million over three seasons. The Colts had seven days to match the contract and retain Utecht, but the March 21 deadline passed and Utecht became a member of the Bengals. Prior to the start of the 2009 season, Utecht suffered a concussion during practice, which was aired on the HBO Television show "Hard Knocks". On August 31, 2009, Utecht was placed on the injured reserve list for the Cincinnati Bengals. He was released on November 17 with an injury settlement.

Receiving statistics

Season	2004	2005	2006	2007	2008
Receptions	0	3	37	31	16
Yards	0	59	377	364	123
Touchdowns	0	2	0	1	0

=== Singing career ===
Following his fifth concussion, Utecht ended his football career to focus on a second career in music. He maintained an interest in performing throughout high school, college and his professional football career and had intended to pursue a musical career after football. Utecht has recorded several albums including a Christmas album for which he was nominated for a 2012 Dove Award. He also went on tour in January 2012 and was featured on the cover of the March/April 2012 issue of Making Music Magazine.

== Personal life ==
The son of a Methodist Minister, Utecht recorded an Inspirational music album, released on May 5, 2009, on Sandi Patty's Stylos label.

His wife, Karyn (Stordahl) of Owatonna, Minnesota, also attended the University of Minnesota and was Miss Minnesota, 2005. Ben and Karyn are parents to four daughters.

=== Traumatic brain injury ===
Utecht, who suffered five known concussions during his football career, was already experiencing memory loss by late 2011, when he was 30 years old. Utecht released his single "You Will Always Be My Girls" in 2014 dedicated to his family in form of a letter to his wife Karyn and his daughters, as Utecht fears that one day that his brain injuries will lead him to not know them.

== Other media ==
Utecht also wrote the book Counting the Days While My Mind Slips Away.

== Discography ==
(credited as Benjamin Utecht)

=== Albums ===
- Ben Utecht
- Man Up
- Two of Hearts: Cherished Love Song Duets (jointly with Anne Cochran)
- Christmas Hope: An Inspirational Holiday Collection

=== Singles ===
- "You Will Always Be My Girls" (2014)
