= 2010 Music City Bowl =

2010 Franklin American Mortgage Music City Bowl
- 13th Music City Bowl
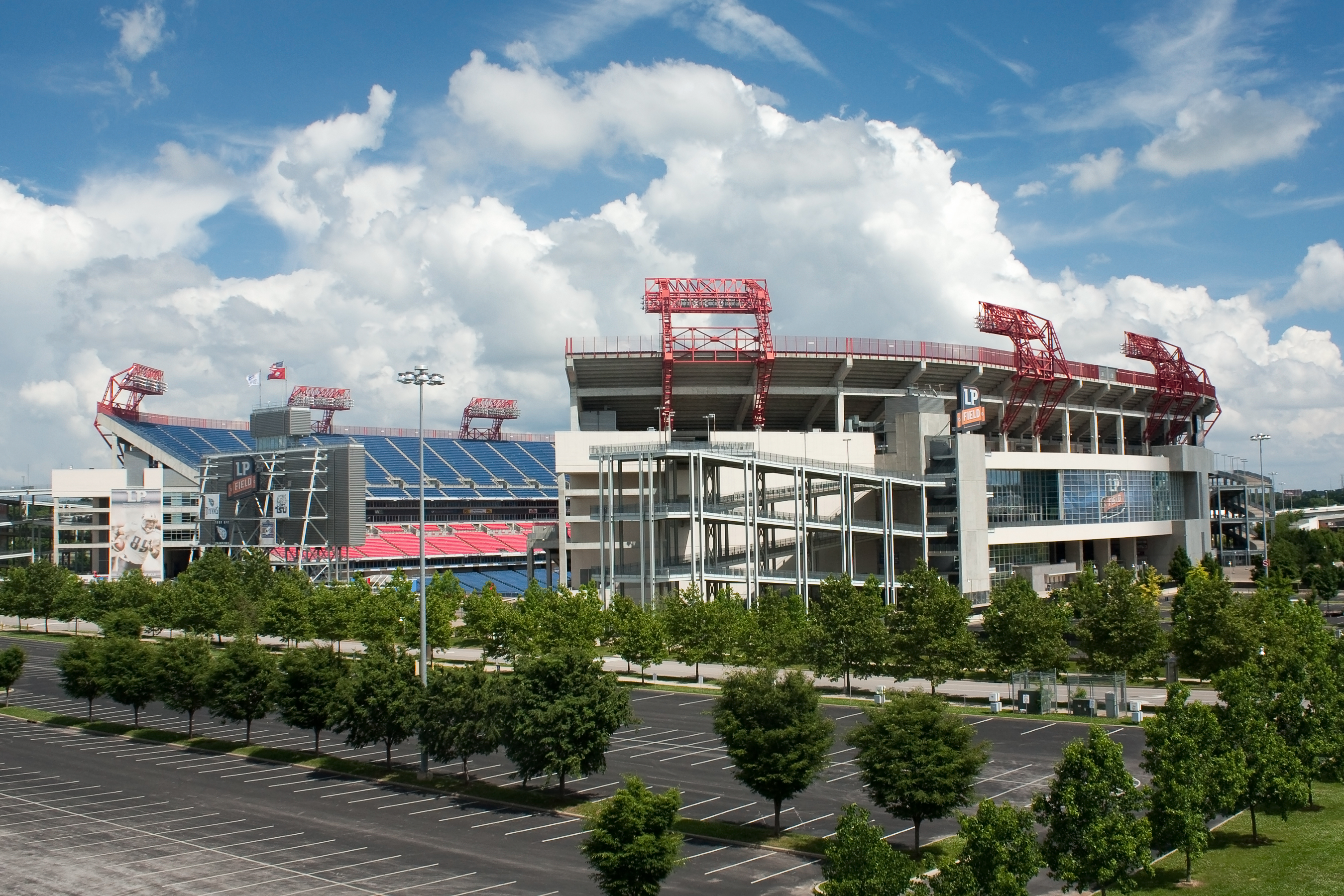
- LP Field in Nashville, Tennessee, hosted the Music City Bowl.
North Carolina Tar Heels	Tennessee Volunteers
(7–5)	(6–6)
ACC	SEC
30	27
Head coach: Butch Davis	Head coach: Derek Dooley
	1	2	3	4	OT	2OT	Total
North Carolina	7	10	0	3	7	3	30
Tennessee	7	7	0	6	7	0	27
- Date: December 30, 2010
- Season: 2010
- Stadium: LP Field
- Location: Nashville, Tennessee
- Favorite: N. Carolina by 2
- Referee: Dennis Lipski (Big Ten Conference)
- Attendance: 69,143
- Payout: US$1,700,000 per team

United States TV coverage
- Network: ESPN
- Announcers: Mark Jones, Bob Davie, Cara Capuano
- Nielsen ratings: 4.9

The 2010 Franklin American Mortgage Music City Bowl was the 13th edition of the college football bowl game and was played at LP Field in Nashville, Tennessee. The game was played on Thursday, December 30, 2010.

The game was notable for its ending, in which North Carolina rushed a field goal unit with too many players to the field in the final seconds of the game and spiked the ball to stop the clock at one second remaining by means of the ensuing penalty. This allowed the Tar Heels to make one more play and score a game-tying field goal; the team went on to win the game 30–27 in double overtime. The controversial ending resulted in an NCAA rule change for the following season, in which a 10-second runoff is assessed on clock-stopping penalties during the final minute of the game.

== Teams ==
The North Carolina Tar Heels represented the Atlantic Coast Conference, and the Tennessee Volunteers represented the Southeastern Conference, the 32nd meeting between the two schools.

Coming into the game, Tennessee held a 20–10–1 record in prior matchups with the last contest having taken place in 1961. Tennessee and UNC were actually scheduled to play one another in 2011 and 2012; however, the series was canceled by Tennessee. The two programs had never before played each other in a bowl game.

=== North Carolina Tar Heels ===
The Tar Heels came into the 2010 season ranked No. 18 in the country in the pre-season AP poll. However, the season would be marked by numerous injuries and suspensions and UNC entered the game with a 7–5 record. North Carolina was making its third straight bowl appearance. Veteran quarterback T. J. Yates was one of the most improved players in the country during the 2010 regular season and was at the heart of the team’s success. He was No. 2 in the ACC in passing efficiency and No. 2 in passing average per game. The Tar Heels were making their first appearance in the Music City Bowl.

=== Tennessee Volunteers ===
Tennessee started the season at 2–6 and looked like it would not be appearing in a bowl game. However, the team rebounded nicely and won their final four games to come into the game at 6–6. The Vols had one of the youngest teams in the country with 21 first-year players on the two-deep chart. Nonetheless, freshman quarterback Tyler Bray had thrown 12 TD passes in his last four starts to get the Vols bowl eligible. This was the first time that Tennessee played in the Music City Bowl. Due to the Vols' appearance, the game generated the largest crowd in its history, a sellout of 69,143.

== Game summary ==
The game ended in unusual fashion. Trailing Tennessee 20–17 with only 31 seconds left, no time-outs and the ball on their own twenty-yard line, the Tar Heels were able to move all the way to the Tennessee 25-yard line with 16 seconds remaining. North Carolina's Shaun Draughn ran the ball for a seven-yard gain but did not get out of bounds to stop the clock. North Carolina tried to rush its field goal unit in an attempt to tie the game; North Carolina had seventeen players on the field as quarterback T. J. Yates tried to stop the clock by spiking the ball at 0:01. Penalty flags flew as the clock on the scoreboard ran out. While the head referee declared the game over and Volunteers players and coaches streamed onto the field in celebration, the replay official called for a review since there had been one second left on the clock when the ball was spiked. The officials reversed the decision on the field, ruling that the ball had in fact been snapped and spiked with one second remaining on the clock. The Tar Heels were penalized five yards for too many men on the field and the clock was reset to 0:01. North Carolina kicker Casey Barth then kicked a 39-yard field goal to tie the score at 20–20 and send the game into overtime. Both teams scored touchdowns in the first overtime period to tie the score at 27–27. In the second overtime period, North Carolina linebacker Quan Sturdivant intercepted a pass from Tennessee quarterback Tyler Bray on the Volunteers' possession and North Carolina kicker Barth kicked a 23-yard field goal to win the game for North Carolina 30–27.

=== Scoring ===
Scoring Play	Score
1st Quarter
UNC – Shaun Draughn 58-yard run (Casey Barth kick), 10:58	UNC 7–0
TENN – Tyler Bray 29-yard pass to Gerald Jones (Daniel Lincoln kick), 2:10	TIE 7–7
2nd Quarter
UNC – Casey Barth 28 yard kick, 10:24	UNC 10–7
TENN – Tyler Bray 45-yard pass to Da'Rick Rogers (Daniel Lincoln kick), 1:30	TENN 14–10
UNC – T. J. Yates 39-yard pass to Erik Highsmith (Casey Barth kick), 0:27	UNC 17–14
3rd Quarter
No scoring	UNC 17–14
4th Quarter
TENN – Tyler Bray 8-yard pass to Justin Hunter (Daniel Lincoln kick missed), 5:16	TENN 20–17
UNC – Casey Barth 40 yard kick, 0:00	TIE 20–20
Overtime
UNC – T. J. Yates 1-yard run (Casey Barth kick)	UNC 27–20
TENN – Tyler Bray 20-yard pass to Luke Stocker (Daniel Lincoln kick)	TIE 27–27
2nd Overtime
UNC – Casey Barth 23 yard kick	UNC 30–27

=== Statistics ===
Statistics	N. Carolina	Tennessee
First downs	21	20
Total offense, plays-yards	385	339
Rushes-yards (net)	29–157	29–27
Passes, Comp-Att-Yds	23–40–234	27–45–312
Fumbles-Interceptions	1–1	0–3
Time of Possession	28:11	31:49
Penalties-Yards	12–80	8–75

== Aftermath ==
Because of the 4th quarter situation in which North Carolina's foul stopped the clock, a rule change was made effective beginning with the 2011 season. The new rule calls for a 10-second runoff to be assessed in addition to any yardage penalty when the offense commits a foul that causes a clock stoppage unless the penalized team opts to take a time out.

Two years later, the NCAA adopted additional rules stipulating that at least three seconds must be left in the half for a team to spike the ball and stop the clock for another play. That rule would not have applied here because the game clock was not stopped prior to the ball being marked ready for play. A couple of plays earlier, North Carolina gained a first down which stopped the clock with 19 seconds remaining. It started when the ball was marked ready for play. In this situation, the 3-second rule would have applied if there were fewer than 3 seconds remaining.
