= Jeremy Banks =

American football player (born 1999)

Profile
- Position: Linebacker

Personal information
- Born: September 23, 1999 (age 27); Cordova, Tennessee
- Listed height: 6 ft 1 in (1.85 m)
- Listed weight: 224 lb (102 kg)

Career information
- High school: Cordova
- College: Tennessee (2018–2022)
- NFL draft: 2023: undrafted

Career history
- Tampa Bay Buccaneers (2023)*
- * Offseason or practice squad member only
- Stats at Pro Football Reference

Jeremy Devon Banks (born September 23, 1999) is an American football linebacker. He played college football at Tennessee.

== Professional career ==
Pre-draft measurables
Height	Weight	Arm length	Hand span	40-yard dash	10-yard split	20-yard split	20-yard shuttle	Three-cone drill	Vertical jump	Broad jump	Bench press
6 ft 0 3/4 in (1.85 m)	232 lb (105 kg)	32 in (0.81 m)	9 1/2 in (0.24 m)	4.53 s	1.56 s	2.63 s	4.38 s	7.27 s	37.5 in (0.95 m)	10 ft 7 in (3.23 m)	25 reps
All values from NFL Combine

=== Tampa Bay Buccaneers ===
On May 12, 2023, Banks signed a three-year, $2.705 million contract with Tampa Bay Buccaneers as an undrafted free agent. On July 24, 2023, he was waived by the Buccaneers.
