= Michael Lehan =

American football player (born 1979)

No. 39, 30, 22
- Position: Cornerback

Personal information
- Born: November 25, 1979 (age 46); Hopkins, Minnesota, U.S.
- Listed height: 6 ft 0 in (1.83 m)
- Listed weight: 200 lb (91 kg)

Career information
- High school: Hopkins (Minnetonka, Minnesota)
- College: Minnesota
- NFL draft: 2003: 5th round, 152nd overall pick

Career history
- Cleveland Browns (2003–2005); Miami Dolphins (2006–2008); New Orleans Saints (2008)

Career NFL statistics
- Total tackles: 141
- Sacks: 1
- Fumble recoveries: 2
- Pass deflections: 12
- Interceptions: 1
- Defensive touchdowns: 1
- Stats at Pro Football Reference

Michael Lehan (born November 25, 1979) is an American former professional football player who was a cornerback in the National Football League (NFL). He was selected by the Cleveland Browns in the fifth round of the 2003 NFL draft. He played college football for the Minnesota Golden Gophers.

Lehan also played for the Miami Dolphins.

== Professional career ==
Pre-draft measurables
| Height | Weight | Arm length | Hand span | 40-yard dash | 10-yard split | 20-yard split | 20-yard shuttle | Three-cone drill | Vertical jump | Broad jump | Bench press |
|---|---|---|---|---|---|---|---|---|---|---|---|
| 6 ft 0 in (1.83 m) | 196 lb (89 kg) | 30 1/4 in (0.77 m) | 8 5/8 in (0.22 m) | 4.48 s | 1.58 s | 2.64 s | 4.15 s | 6.95 s | 34 1/2 in (0.88 m) | 9 ft 11 in (3.02 m) | 13 reps |
All values from NFL Combine.

He was originally a fifth-round draft choice (152nd overall) by the Cleveland Browns in 2003. He appeared in 32 games for the Browns between 2003 and 2005, but was waived by Cleveland on February 23, 2006.

Lehan signed with the Miami Dolphins as a free agent on May 12, 2006, after attending the team's rookie mini-camp from May 5–7 on a tryout basis. On December 16, 2007, he made the first interception of his NFL career, picking-off Baltimore Ravens quarterback Kyle Boller.

Lehan was signed by the New Orleans Saints on December 17, 2008, when Reggie Bush went on injured reserve. However, Lehan did not play in any games for the Saints.

== Personal life ==
Lehan served as principal of Osseo Senior High School in Osseo, Minnesota from 2015 until 2020, when he was promoted to an executive role in the school district.
