= 1997 Carolina Panthers season =

NFL team season

- Owner: Jerry Richardson
- General manager: Bill Polian
- Head coach: Dom Capers
- Offensive coordinator: Joe Pendry
- Defensive coordinator: Vic Fangio
- Home stadium: Ericsson Stadium

Results
- Record: 7–9
- Division place: 2nd NFC West
- Playoffs: Did not qualify
- All-Pros: KR Michael Bates 1st team TE Wesley Walls 2nd team
- Pro Bowlers: TE Wesley Walls

The 1997 Carolina Panthers season was the franchise's 3rd season in the National Football League and the 3rd under head coach Dom Capers. They failed to improve upon their 12–4 record in 1996, and make it to the playoffs for the second time in franchise history and finished 7–9. The Panthers appeared on Monday Night Football for the first time in franchise history. After the season, Toi Cook, who had been with the team since 1996, retired.

== Offseason ==
=== NFL draft ===
1997 Carolina Panthers draft
| Round | Pick | Player | Position | College | Notes |
| 1 | 27 | Rae Carruth | Wide receiver | Colorado | |
| 2 | 56 | Mike Minter | Safety | Nebraska | |
| 3 | 87 | Kinnon Tatum | Linebacker | Notre Dame | |
| 4 | 122 | Tarek Saleh | Linebacker | Wisconsin | |
| 6 | 187 | Matt Finkes | Defensive end | Ohio State | |
| 7 | 228 | Kris Mangum | Tight end | Mississippi | |
Made roster

== Personnel ==
=== Staff ===
1997 Carolina Panthers staff
| Front office: Owner/founder – Jerry Richardson; President – Mark Richardson; General manager – Bill Polian; Head coaches: Head coach – Dom Capers; Offensive coaches: Offensive coordinator – Joe Pendry; Quarterbacks – John Shoop; Running backs – Chick Harris; Wide receivers – Richard Williamson; Tight ends – Don Breaux; Offensive line – Jim McNally; Assistant offensive line – Blair Bush | Defensive coaches: Defensive coordinator – Vic Fangio; Defensive line – Ted Gill; Linebackers – Kevin Steele; Outside linebackers – Billy Davis; Defensive Backs (Secondary) – George Catavolos; Defensive quality control – Greg Roman; Special teams coaches: Special teams – Brad Seely; Strength and conditioning: Strength and conditioning – Chip Morton |

=== Roster ===
1997 Carolina Panthers roster
| Quarterbacks (QB): 7 Steve Beuerlein; 12 Kerry Collins; 9 Shane Matthews; Running backs (RB): 21 Tim Biakabutuka; 43 Scott Greene FB; 23 Anthony Johnson; 32 Fred Lane; 20 Winslow Oliver PR; Wide receivers (WR): 82 Michael Bates KR; 84 Rae Carruth; 81 Rocket Ismail; 89 Ernie Mills; 87 Muhsin Muhammad; 80 Dwight Stone; Tight ends (TE): 49 Luther Broughton; 86 Kris Mangum; 85 Wesley Walls | Offensive linemen (OL): 78 Blake Brockermeyer T; 66 Matt Campbell G; 52 Matt Elliott G/T; 65 Frank Garcia C; 60 Bucky Greeley C; 63 Mark Rodenhauser; 75 Greg Skrepenak G; 70 Todd Stewart T; 73 Jamie Wilson T; Defensive linemen (DL): 93 Mike Fox DE; 71 Greg Kragen NT; 69 Les Miller DE; 95 Tim Morabito NT; 98 Don Sasa DE; 99 Ray Seals DE | Linebackers (LB): 54 Carlton Bailey ILB; 53 Myron Baker ILB; 56 Micheal Barrow OLB; 55 Percell Gaskins ILB; 57 Lamar Lathon OLB; 51 Sam Mills ILB; 58 Andre Royal ILB; 94 Tarek Saleh OLB; 50 Kinnon Tatum ILB; 97 Renaldo Turnbull OLB; Defensive backs (DB): 24 Clifton Abraham CB; 41 Toi Cook CB; 37 Chad Cota SS; 25 Eric Davis CB; 30 Mike Minter FS; 27 Damon Pieri SS; 38 Tyrone Poole CB; 31 Rod Smith CB; 40 Pat Terrell FS; Special teams (ST): 4 John Kasay K; 13 Ken Walter P | Practice squad: 90 William Carr NT; 72 Waverly Jackson DE; 42 Nakia Reddick S; 53 active, 5 inactive, 3 practice squad Reserve: 83 Mark Carrier WR (IR); 76 Norberto Davidds-Garrido T (IR); 96 Shawn King DE (Susp.); 88 Walter Rasby TE (IR); 22 Marquette Smith RB (IR); Rookies in italics |

== Schedule ==
| Week | Date | Opponent | Result | Record | Venue | Attendance |
|---|---|---|---|---|---|---|
| 1 | August 31 | Washington Redskins | **L** 10–24 | 0–1 | Ericsson Stadium | 72,633 |
| 2 | September 7 | at **Atlanta Falcons** | **W** 9–6 | 1–1 | Georgia Dome | 51,829 |
| 3 | September 14 | at San Diego Chargers | **W** 26–7 | 2–1 | Qualcomm Stadium | 63,149 |
| 4 | September 21 | Kansas City Chiefs | **L** 14–35 | 2–2 | Ericsson Stadium | 67,402 |
| 5 | September 29 | **San Francisco 49ers** | **L** 21–34 | 2–3 | Ericsson Stadium | 70,972 |
| 6 | Bye | | | | | |
| 7 | October 12 | at Minnesota Vikings | **L** 14–21 | 2–4 | Hubert H. Humphrey Metrodome | 62,625 |
| 8 | October 19 | at **New Orleans Saints** | **W** 13–0 | 3–4 | Louisiana Superdome | 50,963 |
| 9 | October 26 | **Atlanta Falcons** | **W** 21–12 | 4–4 | Ericsson Stadium | 54,675 |
| 10 | November 2 | Oakland Raiders | **W** 38–14 | 5–4 | Ericsson Stadium | 71,064 |
| 11 | November 9 | at Denver Broncos | **L** 0–34 | 5–5 | Mile High Stadium | 71,408 |
| 12 | November 16 | at **San Francisco 49ers** | **L** 19–27 | 5–6 | 3Com Park | 61,500 |
| 13 | November 23 | at **St. Louis Rams** | **W** 16–10 | 6–6 | Trans World Dome | 64,609 |
| 14 | November 30 | **New Orleans Saints** | **L** 13–16 | 6–7 | Ericsson Stadium | 57,957 |
| 15 | December 8 | at Dallas Cowboys | **W** 23–13 | 7–7 | Texas Stadium | 63,251 |
| 16 | December 14 | Green Bay Packers | **L** 10–31 | 7–8 | Ericsson Stadium | 70,887 |
| 17 | December 20 | **St. Louis Rams** | **L** 18–30 | 7–9 | Ericsson Stadium | 58,101 |
Note: Intra-division opponents are in **bold** text.

== Standings ==
NFC West
| | W | L | T | PCT | PF | PA | STK |
|---|---|---|---|---|---|---|---|
| ^{(1)} San Francisco 49ers | 13 | 3 | 0 | .813 | 375 | 265 | L1 |
| Carolina Panthers | 7 | 9 | 0 | .438 | 265 | 314 | L2 |
| Atlanta Falcons | 7 | 9 | 0 | .438 | 320 | 361 | L1 |
| New Orleans Saints | 6 | 10 | 0 | .375 | 237 | 327 | L1 |
| St. Louis Rams | 5 | 11 | 0 | .313 | 299 | 359 | W1 |
