= 1996 Carolina Panthers season =

NFL team season

- Owner: Jerry Richardson
- General manager: Bill Polian
- Head coach: Dom Capers
- Offensive coordinator: Joe Pendry
- Defensive coordinator: Vic Fangio
- Home stadium: Ericsson Stadium

Results
- Record: 12–4
- Division place: 1st NFC West
- Playoffs: Won Divisional Playoffs (vs. Cowboys) 26–17; Lost NFC Championship (at Packers) 13–30
- All-Pros: MLB Sam Mills 1st team OLB Kevin Greene 1st team OLB Lamar Lathon 1st & 2nd team KR Michael Bates 1st team TE Wesley Walls 2nd team K John Kasay 2nd team
- Pro Bowlers: TE Wesley Walls; QB Kerry Collins; WR Michael Bates; LB Sam Mills; LB Kevin Greene; LB Lamar Lathon; CB Eric Davis; K John Kasay

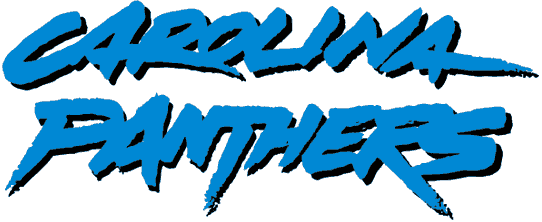
The word mark of Carolina Panthers between 1996 and 2011

The 1996 Carolina Panthers season was the franchise's second season in the National Football League, the second under head coach Dom Capers, and the first at Ericsson Stadium. They improved upon their 7–9 record in 1995, and made it to the playoffs in just their second season of operation.

The Panthers would prove a huge surprise in winning their last seven games of the season to finish with a 12–4 record. The result was that the Panthers won the NFC West, and had a first round bye in the 1996 NFL Playoffs. The Panthers would then beat the Dallas Cowboys 26–17 before falling 30–13 to the eventual Super Bowl champion Green Bay Packers in the NFC Championship.

The Panthers did not return to the playoffs until 2003, when they would make their first Super Bowl but lost to the New England Patriots.

== Offseason ==
Additions	Subtractions
QB Steve Beuerlein (Jaguars)	RB Derrick Moore (Lions)
LB Duane Bickett (Seahawks)	DE Shawn Price (Bills)
CB Eric Davis (49ers)	QB Frank Reich (Jets)
LB Kevin Greene (Steelers)	CB Rod Smith (Vikings)
T Greg Skrepenak (Raiders)	
TE Wesley Walls (Saints)	

=== NFL draft ===
1996 Carolina Panthers draft
Round	Pick	Player	Position	College	Notes
1	8	Tim Biakabutuka	Running back	Michigan	
2	43	Muhsin Muhammad *	Wide receiver	Michigan State	
3	73	Winslow Oliver	Running back	New Mexico	
3	88	J. C. Price	Defensive tackle	Virginia Tech	
4	104	Norberto Davidds-Garrido	Offensive tackle	USC	
4	111	Emmanuel McDaniel	Cornerback	East Carolina	
5	142	Marquette Smith	Running back	Central Florida	
6	193	Scott Greene	Running back	Michigan State	
7	217	Donnell Baker	Wide receiver	Southern	
7	234	Kerry Hicks	Defensive end	Colorado	
Made roster † Pro Football Hall of Fame * Made at least one Pro Bowl during career

== Personnel ==
=== Staff ===
1996 Carolina Panthers staff
Front office: Owner/founder – Jerry Richardson; President – Mike McCormack; General manager – Bill Polian; Head coaches: Head coach – Dom Capers; Offensive coaches: Offensive coordinator – Joe Pendry; Running backs – Chick Harris; Wide receivers – Richard Williamson; Tight ends – Don Breaux; Offensive line – Jim McNally; Assistant offensive line – Blair Bush; Offensive quality control – John Shoop	Defensive coaches: Defensive coordinator – Vic Fangio; Defensive line – Ted Gill; Linebackers – Kevin Steele; Outside linebackers – Billy Davis; Defensive Backs (Secondary) – George Catavolos; Defensive quality control – Greg Roman; Special teams coaches: Special teams – Brad Seely; Strength and conditioning: Strength and conditioning – Chip Morton

=== Roster ===
1996 Carolina Panthers roster
Quarterbacks (QB): 11 Jay Barker; 7 Steve Beuerlein; 12 Kerry Collins; Running backs (RB): 43 Scott Greene FB; 30 Howard Griffith FB; 23 Anthony Johnson; 20 Winslow Oliver PR; 32 Dino Philyaw; Wide receivers (WR): 82 Michael Bates KR; 83 Mark Carrier; 86 Willie Green; 81 Rocket Ismail; 87 Muhsin Muhammad; 80 Dwight Stone; Tight ends (TE): 88 Walter Rasby; 89 Syii Tucker; 85 Wesley Walls	Offensive linemen (OL): 78 Blake Brockermeyer T; 66 Matt Campbell G; 76 Norberto Davidds-Garrido T; 74 Mark Dennis T; 52 Matt Elliott G; 65 Frank Garcia G; 67 Brandon Hayes G; 63 Mark Rodenhauser; 75 Greg Skrepenak G; 64 Curtis Whitley C; Defensive linemen (DL): 93 Mike Fox DE; 96 Shawn King DE; 71 Greg Kragen NT; 69 Les Miller DE; 90 Ed Philion NT; 95 Mark Thomas DE; 98 Gerald Williams DE	Linebackers (LB): 54 Carlton Bailey ILB; 53 Myron Baker ILB; 50 Duane Bickett OLB; 91 Kevin Greene OLB; 57 Lamar Lathon OLB; 51 Sam Mills ILB; 58 Andre Royal ILB; Defensive backs (DB): 41 Toi Cook CB; 37 Chad Cota SS; 25 Eric Davis CB; 29 Steve Lofton CB; 39 Brett Maxie SS; 26 Emmanuel McDaniel CB; 27 Damon Pieri FS; 38 Tyrone Poole CB; 31 Rod Smith CB; 40 Pat Terrell FS; Special teams (ST): 4 John Kasay K; 3 Rohn Stark P	Practice squad: 90 Tim Colston NT; 68 Bucky Greeley C; 84 Brian Wiggins WR; 53 active, 4 inactive, 3 practice squad Reserve: 21 Tim Biakabutuka RB (IR); 44 Bob Christian FB (IR); -- Jim Kubiak; -- Marquette Smith RB (IR); Rookies in italics

== Schedule ==
=== Regular season ===
Week	Date	Opponent	Result	Record	Venue	Recap
1	September 1	**Atlanta Falcons**	**W** 29–6	1–0	Ericsson Stadium	Recap
2	September 8	at **New Orleans Saints**	**W** 22–20	2–0	Louisiana Superdome	Recap
3	Bye					
4	September 22	**San Francisco 49ers**	**W** 23–7	3–0	Ericsson Stadium	Recap
5	September 29	at Jacksonville Jaguars	**L** 14–24	3–1	Jacksonville Municipal Stadium	Recap
6	October 6	at Minnesota Vikings	**L** 12–14	3–2	Hubert H. Humphrey Metrodome	Recap
7	October 13	**St. Louis Rams**	**W** 45–13	4–2	Ericsson Stadium	Recap
8	October 20	**New Orleans Saints**	**W** 19–7	5–2	Ericsson Stadium	Recap
9	October 27	at Philadelphia Eagles	**L** 9–20	5–3	Veterans Stadium	Recap
10	November 3	at **Atlanta Falcons**	**L** 17–20	5–4	Georgia Dome	Recap
11	November 10	New York Giants	**W** 27–17	6–4	Ericsson Stadium	Recap
12	November 17	at **St. Louis Rams**	**W** 20–10	7–4	Trans World Dome	Recap
13	November 24	at Houston Oilers	**W** 31–6	8–4	Astrodome	Recap
14	December 1	Tampa Bay Buccaneers	**W** 24–0	9–4	Ericsson Stadium	Recap
15	December 8	at **San Francisco 49ers**	**W** 30–24	10–4	3Com Park	Recap
16	December 15	Baltimore Ravens	**W** 27–16	11–4	Ericsson Stadium	Recap
17	December 22	Pittsburgh Steelers	**W** 18–14	12–4	Ericsson Stadium	Recap
Note: Intra-division opponents are in **bold** text.

== Standings ==
NFC West
	W	L	T	PCT	PF	PA	STK
^{(2)} Carolina Panthers	12	4	0	.750	367	218	W7
^{(4)} San Francisco 49ers	12	4	0	.750	398	257	W2
St. Louis Rams	6	10	0	.375	303	409	W2
Atlanta Falcons	3	13	0	.188	309	461	L2
New Orleans Saints	3	13	0	.188	229	339	L1

== Regular season results ==
=== Week 1: vs. Atlanta Falcons ===
Kerry Collins started for the Panthers and threw two touchdowns while John Kasay booted five field goals as the Falcons were crushed 29–6.

=== Week 2: at New Orleans Saints ===
Acquired from the Jacksonville Jaguars, quarterback Steve Beuerlein did not throw a single pass, instead rushing three times for a net loss of ten yards; Kerry Collins handled the quarterbacking duties, throwing for 171 yards and one pick while Jim Everett threw for 255 yards and two touchdowns. This game, though, was a battle of field goals; following an 84-yard Winslow Oliver punt return touchdown John Kasay provided the rest of Carolina's offense with five field goals, two of them 51-yarders, for a 22–20 Panthers win.

=== Week 4: vs. San Francisco 49ers ===
The first sign that perennial NFC West champion San Francisco was in for a serious season-long fight with Carolina came as both 2–0 teams clashed at Ericsson Stadium. Steve Beuerlein started and threw for 290 yards, two touchdowns, and one pick; a second pick was called back on a Niners holding call. The Panthers controlled the game from the opening kick as Steve Young was sacked four times and picked off in the fourth quarter by Brett Maxie; Willie Green and Merton Hanks also spent the day jawing at each other following Green catches, ultimately finishing up in a 23–7 Carolina win.

=== Week 5: at Jacksonville Jaguars ===
Former Jaguars quarterback Steve Beuerlein was knocked out of the game after being sacked five times. Kerry Collins managed a touchdown throw but the Jaguars sealed the 24–14 win by recovering a late onside kick.

=== Week 6: at Minnesota Vikings ===
Two Warren Moon touchdown throws were enough for the Vikings as they edged the Panthers 14–12. Anthony Johnson ran in a four-yard touchdown and the Panthers blocked a Vikings punt out of the endzone for a safety, but could manage no closer than the 14–12 final.

=== Week 7: vs. St. Louis Rams ===
The Panthers erupted to over 30 points for the first time in their short history as they hammered the 1–4 Rams. Anthony Johnson rushed for 126 yards and Kerry Collins threw for 196 yards and three touchdowns, while Michael Bates added a 93-yard kickoff-return score. Tony Banks was pounded all day, fumbling to Kevin Greene for a 66-yard touchdown and then getting crushed by Panthers defenders as he unloaded a pass picked off by Chad Cota. The Panthers rocked to a 45–17 win.

=== Week 8: vs. New Orleans Saints ===
The Panthers rolled to a 19–7 win, but the story of the game turned out to be a postgame interview with Saints coach Jim Mora, who ripped the team by saying, "We couldn't do diddley poo offensively" in a tirade that became one of the most famous soundbites in sports history.

=== Week 9: at Philadelphia Eagles ===
The Eagles Ty Detmer delivered 342 passing yards and a touchdown and also got into a brief scrum with Lamar Lathon of the Panthers after a sack. Irving Fryar led the Eagles offense with 143 receiving yards on seven catches as the Eagles won 20–9.

=== Week 10: at Atlanta Falcons ===
The winless Falcons recorded their first win of the season as they sacked Panthers quarterbacks six times and Bobby Hebert tossed a 15-yard score to J. J. Birden. Steve Beuerlein replaced Kerry Collins late in the game and found Mark Carrier from 12-yards out in the fourth quarter; it was not enough to prevent a 20–17 Falcons win.

=== Week 11: vs. New York Giants ===
The Panthers began an eight-game winning streak by erasing a 14–7 first-quarter gap. They intercepted New York Dave Brown three times and outscored the Giants 20–3 after the first quarter.

=== Week 12: at St. Louis Rams ===
Panthers quarterback Steve Beuerlein and Rams quarterback Tony Banks combined for just 290 passing yards. Beuerlein got the better of the duel with a seven-yard score to Anthony Johnson in a 20–10 Panthers win.

=== Week 13: at Houston Oilers ===
Beuerlein torched the 6–6 Oilers with three touchdown throws, to Willie Green and Wesley Walls in a 31–6 Panthers win. Chris Chandler and sophomore Steve McNair each had an interception and the Oilers also fumbled twice.

=== Week 14: vs. Tampa Bay Buccaneers ===
Kerry Collins started and needed only 83 passing yards as the Panthers hammered the Bucs 24–0. Trent Dilfer threw two picks and Shawn King grabbed a Bucs fumble and scored.

=== Week 15: at San Francisco 49ers ===
The Panthers effectively ended San Francisco's hopes of another division title in a matchup of two of the league's best defenses. The two defenses, however, got crushed by offense. The Panthers raced to a 10–0 lead in the first quarter but Steve Young found Brent Jones for a 10–7 score; the second quarter was a points explosion as Kerry Collins connected with Willie Green and ex-Niner Wesley Walls while Young found rookie Terrell Owens from 46 yards out; at the half the Panthers led 27–17. Jerry Rice's five-yard touchdown catch in the fourth was the closest the Niners came to the Panthers as Young was picked off twice and the Niners fumbled two more times; they also were hit with 14 penalties and 121 yards. Carolina thus finished a season sweep 30–24; Collins and Young combined for 720 passing yards.

=== Week 16: vs. Baltimore Ravens ===
Despite two interceptions Kerry Collins threw for 268 yards and two second half scores, erasing a 13–10 Ravens halftime lead in a 27–16 win. Anthony Johnson's 81 rushing yards accounted for all but one of the Panthers yards on the ground.

=== Week 17: vs. Pittsburgh Steelers ===
Former Steelers coach Dom Capers and former Steelers linebacker Kevin Greene greeted Bill Cowher and his AFC Central champions for the regular-season finale. After a Wesley Walls touchdown catch Mike Tomczak was hit in the endzone; he threw the ball before going down but it was ruled intentional grounding, for a Panthers safety. Kordell Stewart ran in an 80-yard touchdown, but in the fourth down 18–14 the Steelers choked on a procedure penalty and then a Chad Cota interception in the endzone. The moment of the year, though, came in the second quarter on a Panthers punt; the ball fell into the endzone and the mascot Sir Purr jumped on the ball even though it was still live; Cowher was laughing hard at the miscue and Sir Purr was listed as having one punt return for zero yards. As of recently, this marks the only time in franchise history the Panthers defeated the Steelers.

== Postseason results ==
=== Postseason ===
Round	Date	Opponent (seed)	Result	Record	Venue	Recap
Wild Card	Bye					
Divisional	January 5, 1997	Dallas Cowboys (3)	W 26–17	13–4	Ericsson Stadium	Recap
Conference	January 12, 1997	Green Bay Packers (1)	L 13–30	13–5	Lambeau Field	Recap

=== NFC Divisional Playoffs: vs. (3) Dallas Cowboys ===
NFC Divisional Playoffs: (3) Dallas Cowboys at (2) Carolina Panthers

Quarter	1	2	3	4	Total
Cowboys	3	8	3	3	17
Panthers	7	10	3	6	26

at Ericsson Stadium, Charlotte, North Carolina

- Date: January 5, 1997
- Game time: 4:00 p.m. EST
- Game weather: 71 °F (22 °C), clear
- Game attendance: 72,808
- Referee: Johnny Grier
- TV announcers (Fox): Pat Summerall and John Madden
- Box score

Game information

First quarter

- DAL – Chris Boniol 22-yard field goal. Cowboys 3–0.
- CAR – Wesley Walls 1-yard pass from Kerry Collins (John Kasay kick). Panthers 7–3.

Second quarter

- CAR – Willie Green 10-yard pass from Kerry Collins (John Kasay kick). Panthers 14–3.
- DAL – Daryl Johnston 2-yard pass from Troy Aikman (pass failed). Panthers 14–9.
- DAL – Carolina snap out of end zone. Panthers 14–11.
- CAR – John Kasay 24-yard field goal. Panthers 17–11.

Third quarter

- DAL – Chris Boniol 21-yard field goal. Panthers 17–14.
- CAR – John Kasay 40-yard field goal. Panthers 20–14.

Fourth quarter

- CAR – John Kasay 40-yard field goal. Panthers 23–14.
- DAL – Chris Boniol 21-yard field goal. Panthers 23–17.
- CAR – John Kasay 32-yard field goal. Panthers 26–17.

Top passers

- DAL – Troy Aikman – 18/36, 165 yards, TD, 3 INT
- CAR – Kerry Collins – 12/22, 100 yards, 2 TD, INT

Top rushers

- DAL – Emmitt Smith – 22 rushes, 80 yards
- CAR – Anthony Johnson – 26 rushes, 104 yards

Top receivers

- DAL – Kevin Williams – 6 receptions, 89 yards
- CAR – Willie Green – 5 receptions, 53 yards, TD

The second-year Panthers held Cowboys quarterback Troy Aikman to 165 passing yards and forced three interceptions en route to their first playoff win in team history. Cowboys receiver Michael Irvin was knocked out of the game on its second play on a hard hit by Lamar Lathon; the hit broke Irvin's collarbone. On offense, running back Anthony Johnson was their top performer with 104 rushing yards and a 9-yard reception. Dallas scored first on kicker Chris Boniol's 22-yard field goal. Carolina quarterback Kerry Collins then threw two touchdown passes, a 1-yarder to tight end Wesley Walls and a 10-yarder to wide receiver Willie Green. The Cowboys countered with a 73-yard drive to score on Aikman's 2-yard touchdown pass to Daryl Johnston, but they failed on the extra point attempt and the Panthers lead was only cut to 14–9. A bad snap on a Carolina punt attempt went out of the end zone to give the Cowboys a safety. But Panthers safety Chad Cota intercepted a pass and returned it 49 yards to set up kicker John Kasay's 24-yard field goal with three seconds in the half, giving Carolina a 17–11 halftime lead. The second half was a battle of field goals with Kasey kicking 3 over Boniol's 2. In the final minutes of the fourth penalties on Tyrone Poole kept a Cowboys drive alive, until Aikman was intercepted by Pat Terrell; the subsequent Kasay field goal ended all hopes for the Cowboys in the 26–17 Carolina win.

=== NFC Championship: at (1) Green Bay Packers ===
NFC Championship: (2) Carolina Panthers at (1) Green Bay Packers

Quarter	1	2	3	4	Total
Panthers	7	3	3	0	13
Packers	0	17	10	3	30

at Lambeau Field, Green Bay, Wisconsin

- Date: January 12, 1997
- Game time: 12:30 p.m. EST/11:30 a.m. CST
- Game weather: 8 °F (−13 °C), clear
- Game attendance: 60,216
- Referee: Bob McElwee
- TV announcers (Fox): Pat Summerall and John Madden
- Box score

Game information

First quarter

- CAR – Howard Griffith 3-yard pass from Kerry Collins (John Kasay kick). Panthers 7–0.

Second quarter

- GB – Dorsey Levens 29-yard pass from Brett Favre (Chris Jacke kick). Tied 7–7.
- CAR – John Kasay 22-yard field goal. Panthers 10–7.
- GB – Antonio Freeman 6-yard pass from Brett Favre (Chris Jacke kick). Packers 14–10.
- GB – Chris Jacke 31-yard field goal. Packers 17–10.

Third quarter

- GB – Chris Jacke 32-yard field goal. Packers 20–10.
- CAR – John Kasay 23-yard field goal. Packers 20–13.
- GB – Edgar Bennett 4-yard run (Chris Jacke kick). Packers 27–13.

Fourth quarter

- GB – Chris Jacke 28-yard field goal. Packers 30–13.

Top passers

- CAR – Kerry Collins – 19/37, 215 yards, TD, 2 INT
- GB – Brett Favre – 19/29, 292 yards, 2 TD, INT

Top rushers

- CAR – Anthony Johnson – 11 rushes, 31 yards
- GB – Edgar Bennett – 25 rushes, 99 yards, TD

Top receivers

- CAR – Mark Carrier – 4 receptions, 65 yards
- GB – Dorsey Levens – 5 receptions, 117 yards, TD

The Packers recorded 201 rushing yards and 476 total yards of offense. Green Bay running back Dorsey Levens recorded 117 yards receiving and 88 yards rushing, including a 29-yard touchdown catch. Quarterback Brett Favre managed to overcome two early turnovers that set up 10 Carolina points, completing 19 out of 29 passes for 292 yards and 2 touchdowns. Packers running back Edgar Bennett, who recorded 99 rushing yards, scored a touchdown from 4 yards out, and kicker Chris Jacke added 3 field goals.

Early in the first quarter, Panthers linebacker Sam Mills intercepted a pass from Favre and returned it to the Packers 3-yard line, setting up Kerry Collins' 3-yard touchdown pass to fullback Howard Griffith. Green Bay struck back with Favre's 29-yard touchdown pass to Levens, but after forcing a punt, Carolina lineman Lamar Lathon recovered a fumble from Favre on the Packers 45-yard line. A few plays later, John Kasay's 22-yard field goal put the Panthers back in the lead, 10–7.

But after that, the Packers dominated the rest of the game. Favre responded by leading Green Bay 71 yards in 15 plays and scoring with a 6-yard touchdown pass to Antonio Freeman. Then on the first play after the ensuing kickoff, safety Tyrone Williams intercepted a pass from Collins on the Packers 38-yard line. Favre's completions to Andre Rison and Freeman for gains of 23 and 25 yards moved the ball into field goal range, and Jacke's 31-yard field goal finished the drive, giving Green Bay a 17–10 halftime lead.

On the first drive of the second half, Green Bay moved the ball 73 yards in 11 plays and scored with another Jacke field goal. The Panthers managed to respond with an 11-play, 73-yard drive of their own and score with Kasay's second field goal, which cut their deficit to 7 points. But Green Bay stormed right back with a 74-yard touchdown drive, featuring a 66-yard reception by Levens. On the next play, Bennett's 4-yard touchdown run gave the Packers a 27–13 lead with two minutes left in the third quarter. In the fourth quarter, Jacke's third field goal put the game out of reach and ended the Panthers' season.

== Awards and records ==
- Dom Capers, NFC Coach of the Year
- Dom Capers, Associated Press, NFL Coach of the Year
