= 1999 Carolina Panthers season =

NFL team season

- Owner: Jerry Richardson
- Head coach: George Seifert
- Offensive coordinator: Gil Haskell
- Defensive coordinator: John Marshall
- Home stadium: Ericsson Stadium

Results
- Record: 8–8
- Division place: 2nd NFC West
- Playoffs: Did not qualify
- All-Pros: ST Michael Bates 1st team TE Wesley Walls 2nd team
- Pro Bowlers: TE Wesley Walls; QB Steve Beuerlein; WR Muhsin Muhammad; PR Michael Bates

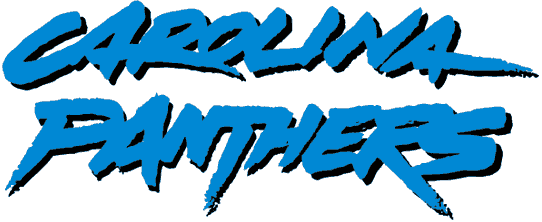
Carolina Panthers wordmark between 1996 and 2011.

The 1999 Carolina Panthers season was the franchise's 5th season in the National Football League and the 1st and under head coach George Seifert who replaced Dom Capers as head coach. They improved upon their 4–12 record in 1998, and the Panthers went 8–8, their first .500 record in franchise history, but failed to make the playoffs for the fourth time in franchise history.

== Offseason ==
=== 1999 expansion draft ===
Panthers selected during the expansion draft
Pick	Name	Position	Expansion team
6	Tarek Saleh	Linebacker	Cleveland Browns

=== NFL draft ===
The 1999 NFL draft took place at Radio City Music Hall in New York City on April 17 and April 18, 1999. The Panthers selected five players in seven rounds. They traded their first-round pick to the Washington Redskins in partial payment for the signing of Sean Gilbert.

1999 Carolina Panthers draft
Round	Pick	Player	Position	College	Notes
2	34	Chris Terry	Offensive tackle	Georgia	
2	38	Mike Rucker *	Defensive end	Nebraska	
4	100	Hannibal Navies	Linebacker	Colorado	
6	175	Robert Daniel	Defensive end	Northwestern State	
7	211	Tony Booth	Safety	James Madison	
Made roster * Made at least one Pro Bowl during career

== Staff ==
1999 Carolina Panthers staff
Front office: Owner/founder – Jerry Richardson; President – Mark Richardson; Director of football operations – Marty Hurney; Director of player personnel – Jack Bushofsky; Head coaches: Head coach – George Seifert; Assistant head coach/defensive coordinator – John Marshall; Offensive coaches: Offensive coordinator – Gil Haskell; Quarterbacks – Bill Musgrave; Running backs – Chick Harris; Wide receivers – Richard Williamson; Tight ends – Don Breaux; Offensive line – Tony Wise; Offensive assistant – Greg Roman	Defensive coaches: Defensive line – Jacob Burney; Linebackers – Sam Mills; Defensive Backs (Secondary) – Bob Valesente; Defensive assistant – Alvin Reynolds; Special teams coaches: Special teams – Scott O'Brien; Assistant special teams coordinator/assistant strength and conditioning – Darrin Simmons; Strength and conditioning: Strength and conditioning – Jerry Simmons

== Roster ==
1999 Carolina Panthers roster
Quarterbacks (QB): 7 Steve Beuerlein; 12 Steve Bono; 2 Dameyune Craig; 8 Jeff Lewis; Running backs (RB): 24 Michael Bates KR; 21 Tim Biakabutuka; 40 William Floyd FB; 44 Chris Hetherington FB; 23 Anthony Johnson; 32 Fred Lane; Wide receivers (WR): 19 Dialleo Burks; 81 Donald Hayes; 83 Patrick Jeffers; 82 Eric Metcalf PR; 87 Muhsin Muhammad; Tight ends (TE): 88 Brian Kinchen LS; 86 Kris Mangum; 85 Wesley Walls	Offensive linemen (OL): 66 Matt Campbell G; 76 Norberto Davidds-Garrido T; 65 Frank Garcia C; 75 Clarence Jones T; 63 Jamar Nesbit C/G; 61 Anthony Redmon G; 60 Clay Shiver C; 67 Bryan Stoltenberg G; 70 Chris Terry T; Defensive linemen (DL): 74 Antonio Dingle DT; 96 Antonio Edwards DE; 94 Sean Gilbert DT; 59 Ernest Jones DE; 79 Vili Maumau DT; 90 Tim Morabito DT; 97 Jason Peter DE; 93 Mike Rucker DE; 99 Chuck Wiley DE	Linebackers (LB): 56 Micheal Barrow OLB; 91 Kevin Greene OLB; 54 Donta Jones OLB; 52 Kory Minor OLB; 53 Hannibal Navies OLB; 55 Steve Tovar MLB; 95 Dean Wells MLB; Defensive backs (DB): 46 Brent Alexander SS; 25 Eric Davis CB; 33 Doug Evans CB; 29 Steve Lofton CB; 30 Mike Minter FS; 28 Roderick Mullen CB/S; 39 Damien Richardson SS; 38 Mike Scurlock FS; Special teams (ST): 3 Richie Cunningham K; 13 Ken Walter P	Practice squad: 77 Dan Best T; 45 Lamont Green LB; 9 Matt Lytle QB; 16 Sirr Parker WR; 68 Alton Weaver DT; Reserve: 31 Tony Booth S (IR); 72 Robert Daniel DE (IR); –– Jerry Jensen LB (IR); 4 John Kasay K (IR); 73 Nate Newton G (IR); 26 Michael Swift CB (IR); 98 Esera Tuaolo DT (IR); 15 Jim Turner WR (IR); 37 Leonard Wheeler CB (IR); Rookies in italics 53 active, 9 reserve, 5 practice squad

== Schedule ==
Week	Date	Opponent	Result	Record	Venue	Attendance
1	September 12	at **New Orleans Saints**	**L** 10–19	0–1	Louisiana Superdome	58,166
2	September 19	Jacksonville Jaguars	**L** 20–22	0–2	Ericsson Stadium	64,261
3	September 26	Cincinnati Bengals	**W** 27–3	1–2	Ericsson Stadium	61,269
4	October 3	at Washington Redskins	**L** 36–38	1–3	Jack Kent Cooke Stadium	76,831
5	Bye					
6	October 17	at **San Francisco 49ers**	**W** 31–29	2–3	3Com Park	68,151
7	October 24	Detroit Lions	**L** 9–24	2–4	Ericsson Stadium	64,332
8	October 31	at **Atlanta Falcons**	**L** 20–27	2–5	Georgia Dome	52,594
9	November 7	Philadelphia Eagles	**W** 33–7	3–5	Ericsson Stadium	62,569
10	November 14	at **St. Louis Rams**	**L** 10–35	3–6	Trans World Dome	65,595
11	November 21	at Cleveland Browns	**W** 31–17	4–6	Cleveland Browns Stadium	72,818
12	November 28	**Atlanta Falcons**	**W** 34–28	5–6	Ericsson Stadium	55,507
13	December 5	**St. Louis Rams**	**L** 21–34	5–7	Ericsson Stadium	62,285
14	December 12	at Green Bay Packers	**W** 33–31	6–7	Lambeau Field	59,869
15	December 18	**San Francisco 49ers**	**W** 41–24	7–7	Ericsson Stadium	62,373
16	December 26	at Pittsburgh Steelers	**L** 20–30	7–8	Three Rivers Stadium	39,428
17	January 2, 2000	**New Orleans Saints**	**W** 45–13	8–8	Ericsson Stadium	56,929
Note: Intra-division opponents are in **bold** text.

== Standings ==
NFC West
	W	L	T	PCT	PF	PA	STK
^{(1)} St. Louis Rams	13	3	0	.813	526	242	L1
Carolina Panthers	8	8	0	.500	421	381	W1
Atlanta Falcons	5	11	0	.313	285	380	W2
San Francisco 49ers	4	12	0	.250	295	453	L3
New Orleans Saints	3	13	0	.188	260	434	L1
