= Anthony Johnson (running back) =

American football player (born 1967)

No. 23, 32, 25
- Position: Running back

Personal information
- Born: October 25, 1967 (age 59); Indianapolis, Indiana, U.S.
- Listed height: 6 ft 0 in (1.83 m)
- Listed weight: 225 lb (102 kg)

Career information
- High school: Adams (South Bend, Indiana)
- College: Notre Dame
- NFL draft: 1990: 2nd round, 36th overall pick

Career history
- Indianapolis Colts (1990–1993); New York Jets (1994); Chicago Bears (1995); Carolina Panthers (1995–1999); Jacksonville Jaguars (2000)

Awards and highlights
- National Championship (1988)

Career NFL statistics
- Rushing yards: 2,966
- Average: 3.6
- Receptions: 284
- Receiving yards: 2,422
- Touchdowns: 16
- Stats at Pro Football Reference

Anthony Scott Johnson (born October 25, 1967) is an American former professional football player who was a running back for 11 seasons in the National Football League (NFL) for the Indianapolis Colts, the New York Jets, the Chicago Bears, the Carolina Panthers, and the Jacksonville Jaguars. He played college football for the Notre Dame Fighting Irish and was selected by the Colts in the second round of the 1990 NFL draft. After his playing career he became the chaplain to the Jacksonville Jaguars.

Johnson attended Stanley Clark School and then played high school football at John Adams High School. Johnson was the first 1,000-yard-rusher for the Carolina Panthers with 1,120 in 1996.

== NFL career statistics ==
Legend
**Bold**	Career high

=== Regular season ===
Year	Team	Games		Rushing					Receiving				
Year	Team	GP	GS	Att	Yds	Avg	Lng	TD	Rec	Yds	Avg	Lng	TD
1990	IND	**16**	0	0	0	0.0	0	0	5	32	6.4	15	2
1991	IND	9	6	22	94	4.3	15	0	42	344	8.2	24	0
1992	IND	15	**13**	178	592	3.3	19	0	49	**517**	10.6	**57**	**3**
1993	IND	13	8	95	331	3.5	14	1	**55**	443	8.1	36	0
1994	NYJ	15	0	5	12	2.4	5	0	5	31	6.2	9	0
1995	CHI	8	0	6	30	5.0	11	0	13	86	6.6	18	0
1995	CAR	7	0	24	110	**4.6**	23	1	16	121	7.6	37	0
1996	CAR	**16**	11	**300**	**1,120**	3.7	**29**	**6**	26	192	7.4	55	0
1997	CAR	**16**	7	97	358	3.7	20	0	21	158	7.5	25	1
1998	CAR	**16**	2	36	135	3.8	21	0	27	242	9.0	38	1
1999	CAR	**16**	0	25	72	2.9	23	0	13	103	7.9	22	0
2000	JAX	12	3	28	112	4.0	19	1	12	153	**12.8**	48	0
Career		159	50	816	2,966	3.6	29	9	284	2,422	8.5	57	7

=== Playoffs ===
Year	Team	Games		Rushing					Receiving				
Year	Team	GP	GS	Att	Yds	Avg	Lng	TD	Rec	Yds	Avg	Lng	TD
1996	CAR	2	2	37	135	3.6	12	0	2	23	11.5	14	0
Career		2	2	37	135	3.6	12	0	2	23	11.5	14	0
