= Sean King =

Sean King may refer to:

- Sean King (footballer) (1964–2025), Australian rules footballer
- Sean King (water polo) (born 1989), British water polo player

== See also ==
- Shawn King (born 1972), American football player
- Shawn King (basketball) (born 1982), Saint Vincent and the Grenadines basketball player
- Shaun King (disambiguation)
