= Shaun King (disambiguation) =

Shaun King (born 1979) is an American writer and activist.

Shaun King may also refer to:

- Shaun King (American football) (born 1977), American football player
- Shaun King (basketball), player from South West Slammers

== See also ==
- Sean King (disambiguation)
- Shawn King (born 1972), American football player, Carolina Panthers and Indianapolis Colts
- Shawn King (basketball) (born 1982), Saint Vincent and the Grenadines basketball player
