= Muhsin Muhammad =

American football player (born 1973)

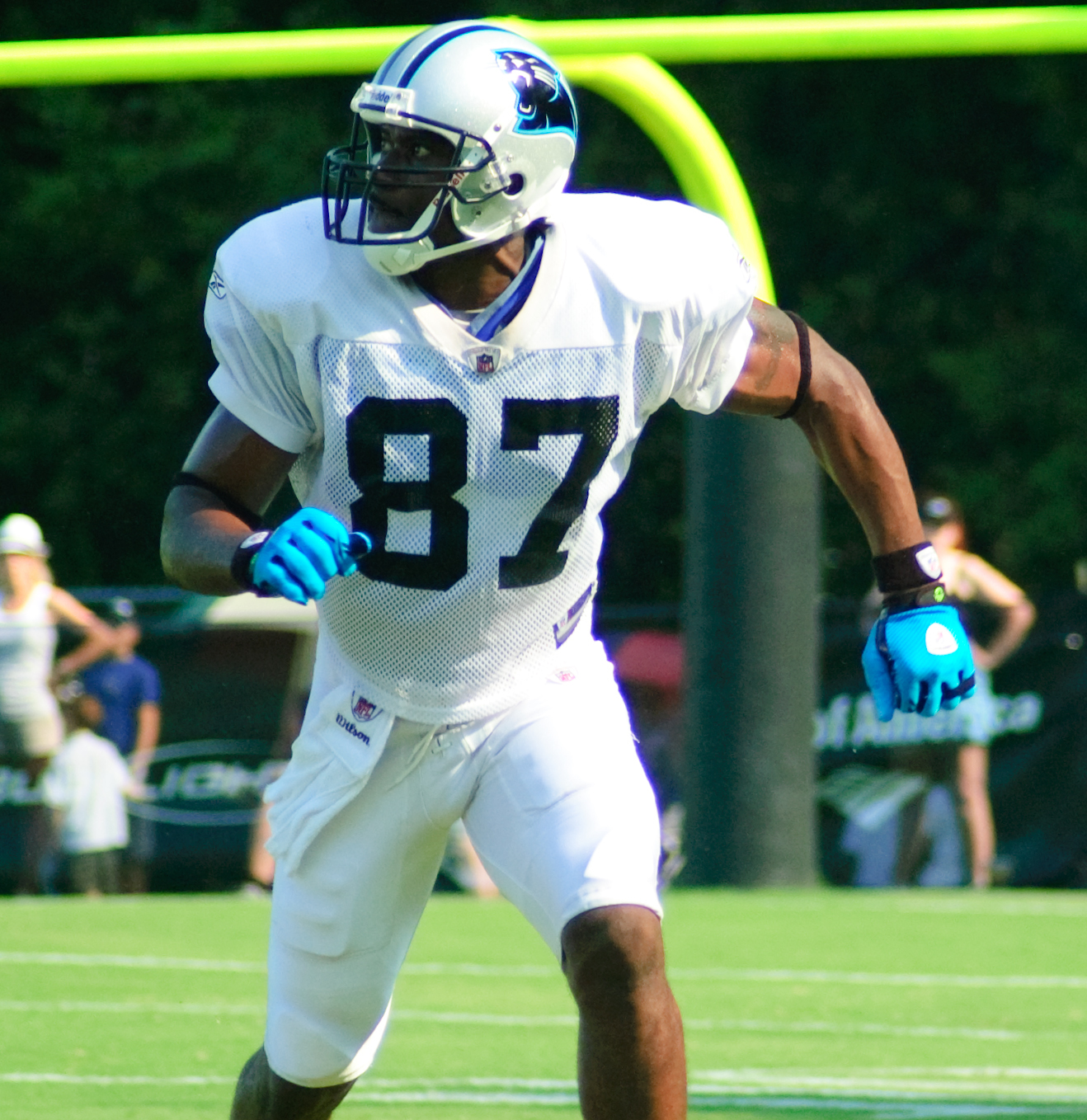
- Muhammad with the Carolina Panthers in 2009

No. 87
- Position: Wide receiver

Personal information
- Born: May 5, 1973 (age 53); Lansing, Michigan, U.S.
- Listed height: 6 ft 2 in (1.88 m)
- Listed weight: 215 lb (98 kg)

Career information
- High school: Waverly Senior (Lansing, Michigan)
- College: Michigan State (1991–1995)
- NFL draft: 1996: 2nd round, 43rd overall pick

Career history
- Carolina Panthers (1996–2004); Chicago Bears (2005–2007); Carolina Panthers (2008–2009)

Awards and highlights
- First-team All-Pro (2004); 2× Pro Bowl (1999, 2004); NFL receiving yards leader (2004); NFL receiving touchdowns leader (2004); NFL receptions co-leader (2000); Carolina Panthers Hall of Honor; NFL record: Longest touchdown reception in a Super Bowl: 85 yards (XXXVIII, from Jake Delhomme)

Career NFL statistics
- Receptions: 860
- Receiving yards: 11,438
- Receiving touchdowns: 62
- Stats at Pro Football Reference

Muhsin Muhammad II (/muːˈsɪn/; born Melvin Darnell Campbell Jr. on May 5, 1973) is an American former professional football player who was a wide receiver for the Carolina Panthers and Chicago Bears of the National Football League (NFL), playing 14 seasons. Muhammad played college football for Michigan State and was selected by the Panthers in the second round of the 1996 NFL draft. A two-time Pro Bowl selection (1999, 2004) and first-team All-Pro selection (2004), Muhammad was known for his nickname, "Moose", and for his signature touchdown dance, which was featured in one of the opening cameos of Madden NFL 2006. He was one of the NFL's best blocking receivers during his career.

== Early life ==
Muhammad was born in Lansing, Michigan. His birth name was Melvin Campbell, but it was changed after his father converted to Islam when Muhammad was four years old.

Muhammad was mainly a soccer player in elementary school, but switched to football when he entered 8th grade. He attended Waverly High School in Lansing, Michigan, where he earned three letters in football and an additional two in basketball and track. Muhammad was also an all-state linebacker and running back at Waverly. In his senior year, he played on the same team with his younger brother, Abdullah Muhammad who played quarterback. Abdullah went on to play football for Army.

After graduating from high school, Muhammad played at Michigan State University. He enjoyed a breakout season in 1995 under coach Nick Saban with 50 catches for 867 yards and 3 touchdowns while playing with quarterback Tony Banks and wide receiver Derrick Mason.

== Professional career ==
Pre-draft measurables
Height	Weight	Arm length	Hand span	40-yard dash	10-yard split	20-yard split	20-yard shuttle	Vertical jump
6 ft 1 3/4 in (1.87 m)	217 lb (98 kg)	33 3/8 in (0.85 m)	10 3/8 in (0.26 m)	4.53 s	1.54 s	2.66 s	4.16 s	33.0 in (0.84 m)
All values from NFL Combine

=== Carolina Panthers (1996–2004) ===
The Carolina Panthers selected Muhammad in the 1996 NFL draft's second round with the 43rd overall pick. He was the ninth wide receiver selected. Muhammad made his NFL debut in Week 2 of the 1996 season against the New Orleans Saints. He had six receptions for 96 yards in the 22–20 victory. He recorded his first NFL touchdown on a 54-yard reception in Week 7 against the St. Louis Rams. Despite battling an injury, Muhammad finished his rookie season with 25 receptions for 407 yards and one touchdown in nine games. In the 4th quarter of his playoff debut against the Dallas Cowboys, Muhammad drew a pass interfearence penalty against cornerback Kevin Smith. The Panthers lost in the NFC Championship to the eventual Super Bowl Champion Green Bay Packers a week later. Muhammad recorded no receptions in either game.

In the 1997 season, Muhammed recorded 27 receptions for 317 yards in 13 games. In the 1998 season, Muhammad led the Panthers with 68 receptions, six touchdowns, and 941 receiving yards.

Muhammad enjoyed an outstanding season in 1999 under new head coach George Seifert and his 96 receptions, eight touchdowns, and 1,253 receiving yards led to his first Pro Bowl selection. His 102 receptions during the 2000 season tied for the NFL lead. Muhammad averaged over 1,000 yards each season from 1998 to 2000.

Muhammad was injured for much of the 2001 NFL season, but he returned to form and eventually played a leading role in the Carolina Panthers' run to Super Bowl XXXVIII during 2003 NFL season. Though the Panthers lost to the AFC Champion New England Patriots 29–32, Muhammad recorded the longest touchdown reception (85 yards) in Super Bowl history.

Muhammad's play during the 2004 season, where he led the NFL with a career-high 1,405 receiving yards and 16 receiving touchdowns, earned him his second Pro Bowl invitation. He earned first team All-Pro honors. By the end of the season, Muhammad held all of the Panthers' receiving records, including catches (578), receiving yards (7,751), 100-yard games (26), and the top three single-game yardage totals (192, 189, 179). In addition, he tied Wesley Walls at 44 touchdown receptions.

Muhammad, who was due a $10 million roster bonus, and the Panthers could not agree on a contract after the 2004 season, and the team released him in February 2005. Hours after his release, the Chicago Bears offered the 32-year-old a six-year contract, and Muhammad left Charlotte for Chicago.

Muhammad's first stint with the Panthers was plagued with several negative experiences. He was the target of a racial slur from his quarterback, Kerry Collins; testified at murder hearings for Rae Carruth and Deidra Lane (wife of Fred Lane); and was arrested in 2003 on misdemeanor drug and weapon offenses.

=== Chicago Bears (2005–2007) ===
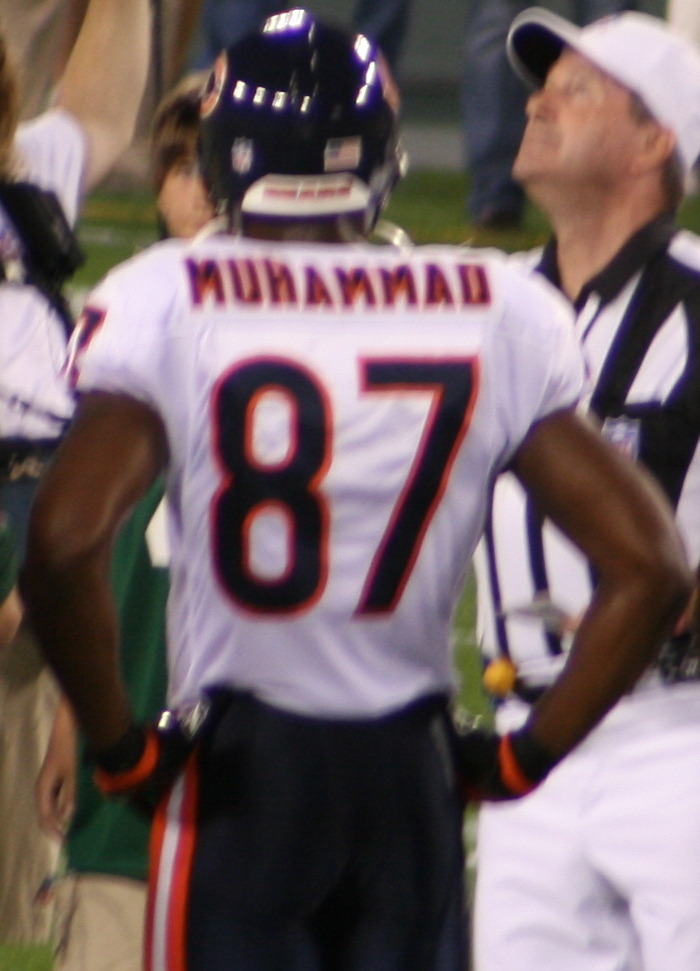
Muhammad with the Chicago Bears in 2007

Muhammad became one of the Bears' receiving threats during his first year with the team. He was also credited with encouraging a stronger work ethic within the team's receiving corps and advising young wide receivers such as Bernard Berrian, Mark Bradley, and Rashied Davis.

Despite failing to catch several poorly thrown passes from rookie quarterback Kyle Orton, Muhammad held himself responsible and promised reporters he would improve his performance. However, Muhammad was later seen complaining to Orton during a Sunday Night Football game against the Atlanta Falcons. After Muhammad's criticism, coach Lovie Smith benched Orton in favor of a fully recovered Rex Grossman.

Muhammad's statistics improved with Rex Grossman at quarterback in the 2006 season. He had his first one hundred-yard day with the Bears in their season opener against the Green Bay Packers, and a second against the Minnesota Vikings during Week 3. However, he saw less action as Grossman began to play inconsistently after the season's midway point. Muhammad defended Grossman from criticism and often supported him at press conferences. Muhammad finished the regular season as the team's leading wide receiver for the second consecutive time.

Muhammad was the starting receiver for the Bears in Super Bowl XLI, making a touchdown reception in the first half of a 29–17 loss to the Indianapolis Colts. Muhammad became the third player in NFL history to score a Super Bowl touchdown with two different teams, joining Jerry Rice and Ricky Proehl.

Muhammad's age seemingly affected his endurance. Although he played all sixteen games in 2006, the Bears listed him as probable or questionable before many games. Before the 2006 season, he revealed he had played through the 2005 season with a broken hand.

Muhammad had a down year in 2007 with 40 receptions for 570 yards and three touchdowns. The Bears released him on February 18, 2008.

After leaving the Bears, Muhammad told Sports Illustrated Chicago is "where wide receivers go to die", a remark debated on in the media.

=== Carolina Panthers (second stint) (2008–2009) ===
Just nine days after the Bears released him, Muhammad signed a two-year contract with his former team, the Carolina Panthers. On September 14, while playing against the Bears, he became the 29th player in NFL history to reach 10,000 career receiving yards. In Week 4, against the Atlanta Falcons, he had eight receptions for 147 yards and a touchdown in the 24–9 victory. He finished the season with 65 receptions for 923 yards and five touchdowns.

In the 2009 season, Muhammad caught 53 passes for 581 receiving yards and a receiving touchdown in 14 games and starts. After 14 seasons in the NFL, he retired from professional football. At the time of his retirement, Muhammad was the Panthers' all-time leader in receptions and receiving yards, and he was tied with Steve Smith Sr. for most receiving touchdowns.

Muhammad, along with defensive end Julius Peppers, was added to the Carolina Panthers Hall of Honor on October 29, 2023.

== NFL career statistics ==
Legend
	Led the league
**Bold**	Career high
^{±}	Pro Bowler

=== Regular season ===
Year	Team	Games		Receiving					Rushing					Fumbles	
Year	Team	GP	GS	Rec	Yds	Avg	Lng	TD	Att	Yds	Avg	Lng	TD	Fum	Lost
1996	CAR	9	5	25	407	**16.3**	54	1	1	–1	–1.0	–1	0	0	0
1997	CAR	13	5	27	317	11.7	38	0	—	—	—	—	—	0	0
1998	CAR	16	16	68	941	13.8	**72**	6	—	—	—	—	—	2	0
1999	CAR^{±}	15	15	96	1,253	13.1	60	8	—	—	—	—	—	1	**1**
2000	CAR	16	16	**102**	1,183	11.6	36	6	2	12	6.0	8	0	1	0
2001	CAR	11	11	50	585	11.7	43	1	—	—	—	—	—	2	**1**
2002	CAR	14	14	63	823	13.1	42	3	**3**	**40**	**13.3**	**20**	0	0	0
2003	CAR	15	15	54	837	15.5	60	3	2	–2	–1.0	0	0	**3**	**1**
2004	CAR^{±}	16	16	93	**1,405**	15.1	51	**16**	**3**	15	5.0	13	0	**3**	**1**
2005	CHI	15	15	64	750	11.7	33	4	—	—	—	—	—	0	0
2006	CHI	16	16	60	863	14.4	40	5	—	—	—	—	—	1	**1**
2007	CHI	16	16	40	570	14.3	44	3	—	—	—	—	—	0	0
2008	CAR	16	15	65	923	14.2	60	5	—	—	—	—	—	2	**1**
2009	CAR	14	13	53	581	11.0	27	1	—	—	—	—	—	0	0
Totals		202	188	860	11,438	13.3	72	62	11	64	5.8	20	0	15	6

=== Postseason ===
Year	Team	Games		Receiving					Rushing					Fumbles	
Year	Team	GP	GS	Rec	Yds	Avg	Lng	TD	Att	Yds	Avg	Lng	TD	Fum	Lost
1996	CAR	2	0	0	0	0.0	0	0	—	—	—	—	—	0	0
2003	CAR	4	4	**15**	**352**	**23.5**	**85**	**2**	**3**	**14**	**4.7**	**6**	0	**1**	0
2005	CHI	1	1	3	58	19.3	24	0	—	—	—	—	—	0	0
2006	CHI	3	3	7	93	13.3	22	1	—	—	—	—	—	0	0
2008	CAR	1	1	5	55	11.0	20	0	—	—	—	—	—	0	0
Totals		11	9	30	558	18.6	85	3	3	14	4.7	6	0	1	0

In a 2003 playoff game against the St. Louis Rams, Muhammad recovered a fumble in the endzone for a touchdown. In total, he has 4 career postseason TDs.

=== Carolina Panthers franchise records ===
- Receiving touchdowns in a single season: 16 (2004)
- Yds/Rec: playoffs (20.35), playoff game (35 on 2004-02-01 NNWE), rookie season (16.28 in 1996)
- Receiving TDs: season (16 in 2004), game (3 on 1999-12-18 SFO and 2004-11-14 @SFO; with Steve Smith Sr. x2)
- Games with 2+ touchdowns scored: season (5 in 2004; with Steve Smith Sr. and DeAngelo Williams)

== Broadcasting career ==
During the 2002 and 2003 off-season, Muhammad became a color commentator for NFL Europe on behalf of Fox television. He also was a post-season correspondent for NFL Network in 2004 and has worked as a color commentator for the Big Ten Network

Muhammad won a Chicago Emmy Award for Outstanding Achievement for Sports Programs for his segment, Hanging with the Moose, which aired on Comcast SportsNet's "SportsNite" in 2005.

== Personal life ==
Despite his father's conversion to Islam, Muhammad is a Christian. He is married to Christa Muhammad. The couple has four daughters and two sons: (oldest to youngest) Jordan, Chase, Journey, Muhsin III, Maddon, and Kennedy. The family adopted Maddon and Journey from Ethiopia in 2007. Jordan is a member of the women's basketball team at Princeton University. Chase is a member of the women's basketball team at Johnson & Wales University Charlotte. Muhsin III is a former member of the Texas A&M football team and, like Muhsin II, the NFL's Carolina Panthers. Maddon is a member of the UNC Charlotte Track and Field team.

Muhammad works as a managing director at the private equity firm Axum Capital Partners, a firm he co-founded.

=== Philanthropy ===
Muhammad's charity foundation, "The M2 Foundation for Kids", is dedicated to improving the mental and physical development of children. He also supports the "Back to Nature" program which encourages children to spend more time with nature by taking them on hikes throughout the Great Smoky Mountains and nature preserves in Tennessee and the Muscular Dystrophy Association in Charlotte, North Carolina, where he raised funds and awareness for the group by helping organize Christmas toy drives and a special football camp. Muhammad is also a spokesperson for the "Men For Change" organization, which helps raise money for impoverished women's shelters.

On February 28, 2007, Muhammad's high school alma mater gave him a special award for donating $50,000 worth of equipment to school's fitness center, which was renamed in his honor.

The Carolina Panthers presented Muhammad with their Walter Payton Man of the Year award in 1999 for his charity and volunteer work.
