= 1997 Pro Bowl =

National Football League all-star game

1997 NFL Pro Bowl
AFC	NFC
26	23
Head coach: Tom Coughlin (Jacksonville Jaguars)	Head coach: Dom Capers (Carolina Panthers)
	1	2	3	4	OT	Total
AFC	0	3	7	13	3	26
NFC	9	0	6	8	0	23
- Date: February 2, 1997
- Stadium: Aloha Stadium; Honolulu, Hawaii
- MVP: Mark Brunell (Jacksonville Jaguars)
- Referee: Larry Nemmers
- Attendance: 50,031

TV in the United States
- Network: ABC
- Announcers: Al Michaels, Frank Gifford, Dan Dierdorf, Lynn Swann and Lesley Visser

The 1997 Pro Bowl was the NFL's all-star game for the 1996 season. The game was played on February 2, 1997, at Aloha Stadium in Honolulu, Hawaii. The final score was AFC 26, NFC 23. Mark Brunell of the Jacksonville Jaguars was the game's MVP. In the game, Brunell threw for 236 yards. He connected with the Oakland Raiders Tim Brown for an 80-yard touchdown to tie the game at 23 with only 44 seconds to go.

The referee was Larry Nemmers.

To date, this is the most recent Pro Bowl that went to overtime.

== Roster ==
Names in Bold indicate starters

**AFC (American Football Conference) Roster**
**Head coach**
Tom Coughlin – Jacksonville

**QB**
**Drew Bledsoe** – New England
Mark Brunell – Jacksonville
John Elway – Denver
Vinny Testaverde – Baltimore

**RB**
**Jerome Bettis** – Pittsburgh
**Terrell Davis** – Denver
Curtis Martin – New England

**FB**
Kimble Anders – Kansas City

**WR**
**Carl Pickens** – Cincinnati
**Tony Martin** – San Diego
Keenan McCardell – Jacksonville
Tim Brown – Oakland

**TE**
**Shannon Sharpe** – Denver
Ben Coates – New England

**OL**
**Richmond Webb** - Miami
**Bruce Matthews** – Houston
**Dermontti Dawson** – Pittsburgh
**Will Shields** – Kansas City
**Bruce Armstrong** – New England
Tony Boselli – Jacksonville
Ruben Brown – Buffalo
Tom Nalen – Denver

**DL**
**Chester McGlockton** – Oakland
**Michael Sinclair** – Seattle
**Cortez Kennedy** - Seattle
**Alfred Williams** - Denver
Bruce Smith – Buffalo
Bryce Paup – Buffalo
Ted Washington – Buffalo

**LB**
**Derrick Thomas** – Kansas City
**Junior Seau** – San Diego
**Chad Brown** – Pittsburgh
Levon Kirkland – Pittsburgh
Chris Slade – New England

**DB**
**Rod Woodson** – Pittsburgh
**Carnell Lake**– Pittsburgh
**Eric Turner** - Baltimore
**Ashley Ambrose** – Cincinnati
Dale Carter – Kansas City
Steve Atwater – Denver
Blaine Bishop – Houston

**K**
Cary Blanchard – Indianapolis

**P**
Chris Gardocki – Indianapolis

**NFC (National Football Conference) Roster**
**Head coach**
Dom Capers – Carolina

**QB**
**Brett Favre** – Green Bay
Kerry Collins – Carolina
Gus Frerotte – Washington
Steve Young – San Francisco
Troy Aikman – Dallas

**RB**
**Terry Allen** – Washington
**Barry Sanders** – Detroit
Ricky Watters – Philadelphia

**FB**
Larry Centers – Arizona

**WR**
**Herman Moore** – Detroit
**Isaac Bruce** – St. Louis
Cris Carter – Minnesota
Irving Fryar – Philadelphia
Rob Moore – Arizona
Michael Bates – Carolina

**TE**
**Wesley Walls** – Carolina
Keith Jackson – Green Bay

**OL**
Erik Williams – Dallas
Randall McDaniel – Minnesota
Kevin Glover – Detroit
Larry Allen – Dallas
William Roaf – New Orleans

**DL**
**Reggie White** – Green Bay
**John Randle** – Minnesota
**Bryant Young** – San Francisco
**Tony Tolbert** - Dallas
Warren Sapp – Tampa Bay
Michael Strahan – New York Giants
Chris Doleman – San Francisco

**LB**
**Sam Mills** – Carolina
**Kevin Greene** – Carolina
**Lamar Lathon** – Carolina
Jessie Armstead – New York Giants
Derrick Brooks – Tampa Bay
Hardy Nickerson – Tampa Bay
Ken Harvey – Washington

**DB**
**Eric Davis** – Carolina
**LeRoy Butler** - Green Bay
**Aeneas Williams** – Arizona
**Merton Hanks** – San Francisco
Darren Woodson – Dallas
Deion Sanders – Dallas
Darrell Green – Washington

**K**
John Kasay – Carolina

**P**
Matt Turk – Washington
