= John Kasay =

American football player (born 1969)

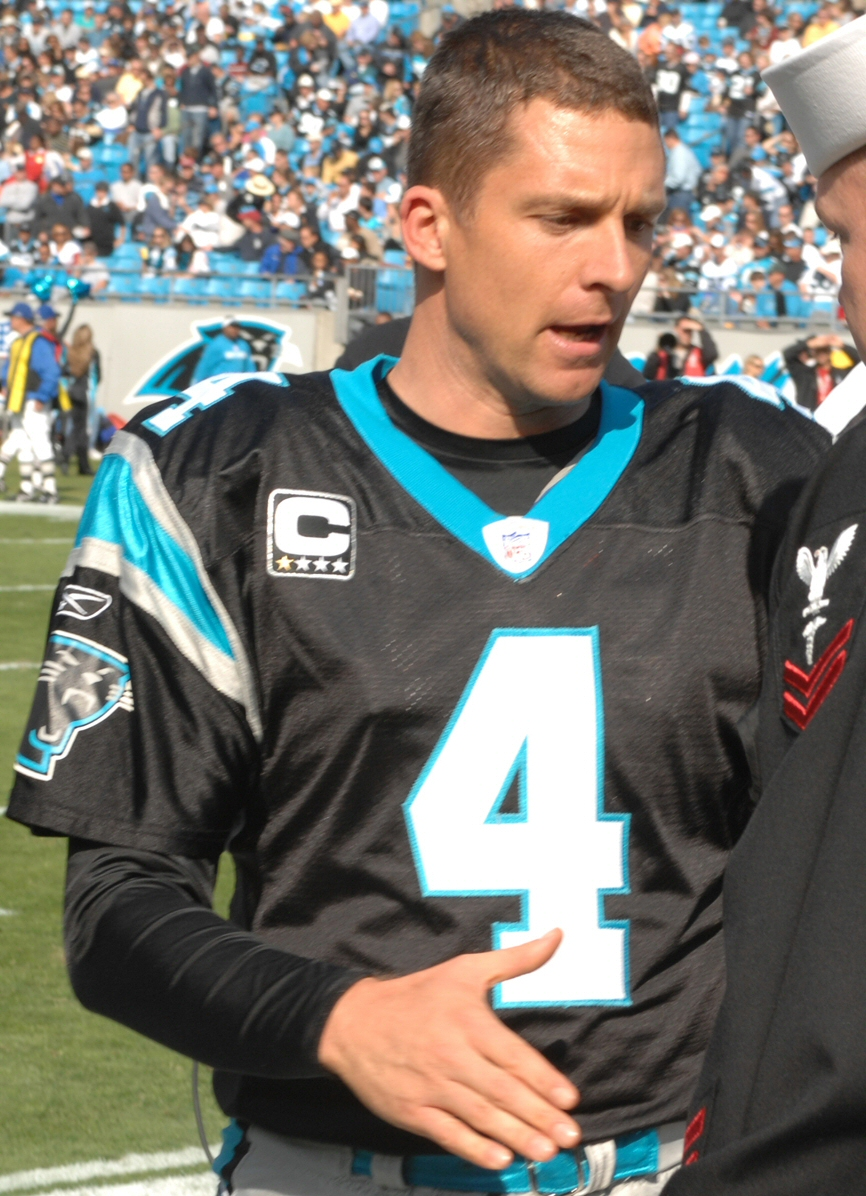
- Kasay with the Carolina Panthers in 2007

No. 4, 2
- Position: Placekicker

Personal information
- Born: October 27, 1969 (age 57); Athens, Georgia, U.S.
- Listed height: 5 ft 10 in (1.78 m)
- Listed weight: 212 lb (96 kg)

Career information
- High school: Clarke Central (Athens)
- College: Georgia (1987–1990)
- NFL draft: 1991: 4th round, 98th overall pick

Career history
- Seattle Seahawks (1991–1994); Carolina Panthers (1995–2010); New Orleans Saints (2011)

Awards and highlights
- Second-team All-Pro (1996); Pro Bowl (1996); NFL scoring leader (1996); PFWA All-Rookie Team (1991); Second-team All-SEC (1990)

Career NFL statistics
- Field goals made: 461
- Field goals attempted: 563
- Field goal %: 81.9
- Longest field goal: 56
- Points scored: 1,970
- Stats at Pro Football Reference

John David Kasay (born October 27, 1969) is an American former professional football player who was a kicker for 21 seasons in the National Football League (NFL), primarily with the Carolina Panthers. He played college football for the Georgia Bulldogs and was selected by the Seattle Seahawks in the fourth round of the 1991 NFL draft. Kasay left the Seahawks in 1995 to sign with the expansion Panthers, whom he was a member of for 16 seasons. He became the Panthers' all-time leading scorer, while also earning Pro Bowl honors during the 1996 season and making a Super Bowl appearance in Super Bowl XXXVIII. Retiring after one season with the New Orleans Saints, Kasay was the last remaining active member of the inaugural Panthers team.

== Early life ==
Kasay attended Clarke Central High School in Athens, Georgia, where he was a soccer standout and football kicker/punter. He was an all-state selection with 37 career field goals, including a 54-yarder.

== College career ==
Kasay was a four-year letterman at the University of Georgia. He finished his college career fifth on the school's career kick scoring list with 217 points, converting 46-of-65 field goals and 79-of-82 extra points. Kasay graduated from Georgia in 1991 with a degree in journalism.

== Professional career ==
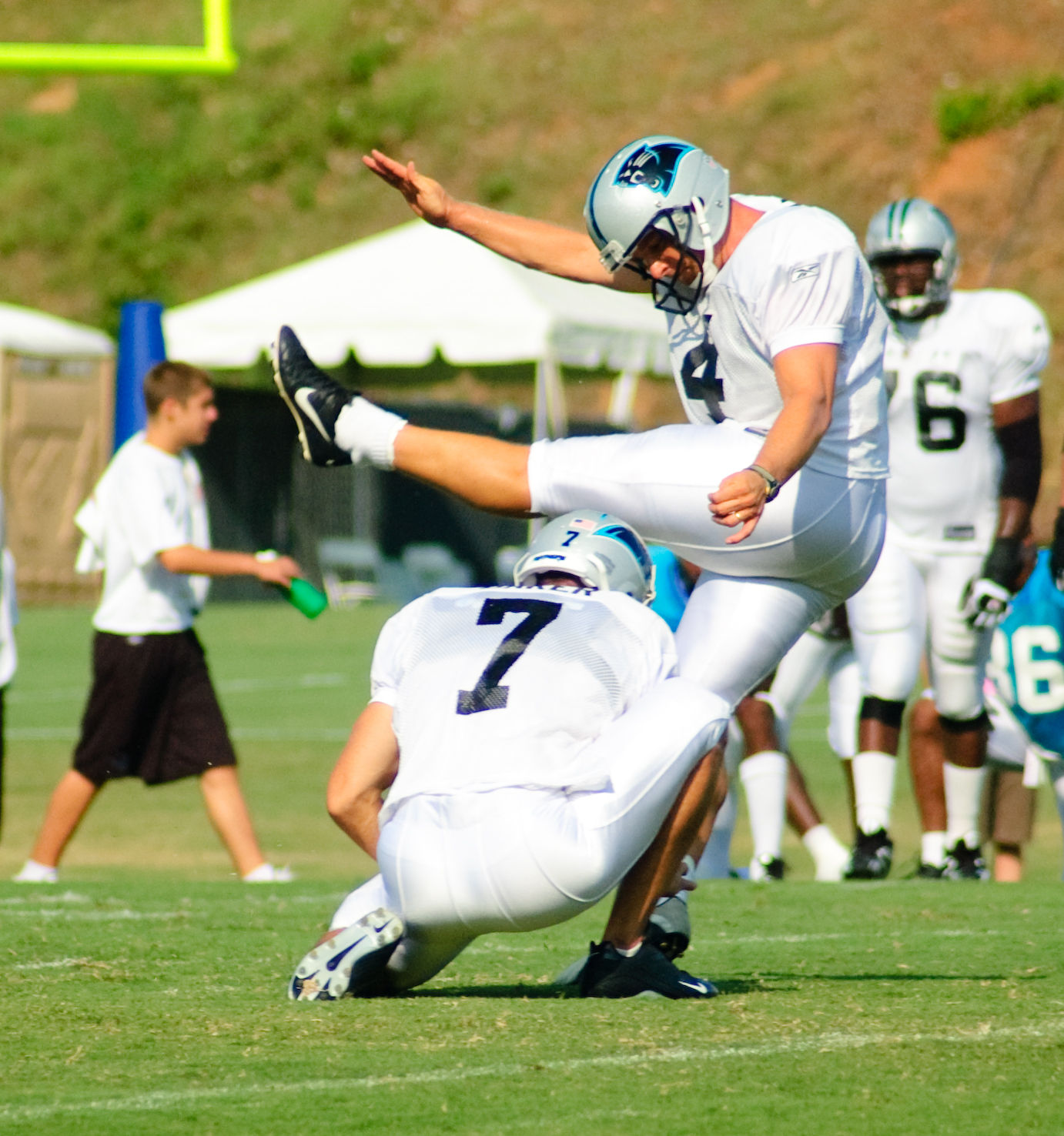
Kasay (4) with the Carolina Panthers in 2008

Kasay was drafted in the fourth round in 1991 by the Seattle Seahawks. During his tenure, he led the Seahawks in scoring all four years, and left the team with the highest field goal percentage in team history. The Panthers signed him as a free agent prior to the team's debut in the 1995 season. He played for the Panthers in 15 seasons, but missed the whole 2000 season after breaking his left kneecap in August.

Super Bowl XXXVIII was bittersweet for Kasay. Although he converted a 50-yard field goal and made both extra points, his final kickoff went out of bounds, incurring an illegal procedure penalty that placed the ball on the 40. This assisted the New England Patriots on their drive that resulted in the game winning field goal.

Kasay continued to play for the Panthers through the 2010 season. On July 28, 2011, he was released by Carolina after they signed Olindo Mare. He was the last remaining player left from the Panthers' 1995 inaugural season and the last NFL player born in the 1960s to retire.

The New Orleans Saints signed Kasay on August 30, 2011, after an injury to their starting kicker Garrett Hartley during a preseason game. According to Al Michaels during the Thursday Night Football broadcast against the Green Bay Packers on September 8, 2011, Kasay was at a "back-to-school" event when he received a phone call from the Saints wishing to sign him. Kasay played out the 2011 season in New Orleans, and was re-signed through the 2012 NFL season by Saints on April 26, 2012. However, he was released by the Saints on August 31, 2012, with the return of Hartley.

On May 7, 2013, the Panthers announced that Kasay would sign a one-day contract and retire as a Panther. The Panthers held a press conference at Bank of America Stadium that day to honor Kasay; team owner Jerry Richardson introduced Kasay, and many players, as well as the Richardson family, attended the event. Kasay became eligible for induction in the team's Ring of Honor five years after his retirement.

== Career regular season statistics ==
Career high/best bolded

Regular season statistics
Season	Team (record)	G	FGM	FGA	%	<20	20-29	30-39	40-49	50+	LNG	BLK	XPM	XPA	%	PTS
1991	SEA (7–9)	**16**	25	31	80.6	1–1	5–6	11–14	6–7	2–3	54	0	27	28	96.4	102
1992	SEA (2–14)	**16**	14	22	63.6	0–0	4–5	8–11	2–6	0–0	43	0	14	14	**100.0**	56
1993	SEA (6–10)	**16**	23	28	82.1	1–1	5–5	10–11	4–6	3–5	55	0	29	29	**100.0**	98
1994	SEA (6–10)	**16**	20	24	83.3	1–1	1–1	**11–11**	6–9	1–2	50	1	25	26	96.2	85
1995	CAR (7–9)	**16**	26	33	78.8	0–0	6–6	10–14	9–12	1–1	52	2	27	28	96.4	105
1996	CAR (12–4)	**16**	**37**	**45**	82.2	**2–2**	**14–14**	11–12	7–10	3–7	53	0	34	35	97.1	145
1997	CAR (7–9)	**16**	22	26	84.6	1–1	6–7	8–8	4–4	3–6	54	1	25	25	**100.0**	91
1998	CAR (4–12)	**16**	19	26	73.1	0–0	5–5	4–5	6–9	**4–7**	**56**	**3**	35	37	94.6	92
1999	CAR (8–8)	13	22	25	88.0	1–1	8–8	6–6	5–6	2–4	52	0	33	33	**100.0**	99
2000	CAR (7–9)	Did not play due to injury														
2001	CAR (1–15)	**16**	23	28	82.1	0–0	10–10	4–4	7–9	2–5	52	0	22	23	95.7	91
2002	CAR (7–9)	2	2	5	40.0	0–0	2–2	0–0	0–2	0–1	27	1	5	5	**100.0**	11
2003	CAR (11–5)	**16**	32	38	84.2	0–0	13–13	6–8	11–13	2–4	53	0	29	30	96.7	125
2004	CAR (7–9)	14	19	22	86.4	0–0	11–11	4–4	1–2	3–5	54	1	27	28	96.4	84
2005	CAR (11–5)	**16**	26	34	76.5	1–1	8–8	8–8	6–9	3–8	52	2	43	44	97.7	121
2006	CAR (8–8)	**16**	24	27	88.9	**2–2**	6–6	4–4	8–8	**4–7**	54	0	28	28	**100.0**	100
2007	CAR (7–9)	**16**	24	28	85.7	**2–2**	6–6	8–9	6–9	2–2	53	0	27	27	**100.0**	99
2008	CAR (12–4)	**16**	28	31	**90.3**	0–0	7–7	9–9	**11–12**	1–3	50	0	46	46	**100.0**	130
2009	CAR (8–8)	**16**	22	27	81.5	0–0	7–7	9–10	5–6	1–4	50	**3**	31	32	96.9	97
2010	CAR (2–14)	**16**	25	29	86.2	0–0	9–9	2–2	11–14	3–4	55	0	17	17	**100.0**	92
2011	NO (13–3)	**16**	28	34	82.4	0–0	11–11	10–10	5–8	2–5	53	0	**63**	**63**	**100.0**	**147**
Career (21 seasons)		301	461	563	81.9	12–12	144–147	143–160	120–161	42–83	56	14	587	598	98.2	1970

== Awards and records ==
Kasay formerly held the record for most field goals in a single season with 37 in 1996, and he was awarded a Pro Bowl appearance as a result. This has been surpassed by Olindo Mare (39 in 1999), Neil Rackers (42 in 2005), and David Akers (44 in 2011).

Kasay also holds many NFL records as a placekicker. He is second all-time for field goals made from 50+ yards (42) made behind only Jason Hanson (50) and is the only player to convert on four field goals from 46+ yards in a single game.

Kasay hit his 400th field goal on December 6, 2009, in a game against the Tampa Bay Buccaneers. He is only the 7th player in NFL history to accomplish that. Kasay is the longest tenured player to play for the Panthers.

As of 2017's NFL off-season, John Kasay held at least 9 Panthers franchise records, including:

- Extra Points: career (429), game (5 on 2006-01-01 @ATL; with Richie Cunningham and Graham Gano), playoffs (18)
- Field Goals: career (351), season (37 in 1996), game (6 on 2004-12-05 @NOR), playoffs (21), playoff season (9 in 2003), playoff game (5 on 2004-01-03 DAL)
- Points: as of July 12, 2025 he is the all-time scoring leader for the Carolina Panthers with 1,482 points.

== Personal life ==
Kasay is married with two sons and two daughters and is a Christian. He served as the athletic director for the Charlotte Christian School after retiring from football and is working to publish a biography.
