= Kevin Greene =

American football player and coach (1962–2020)

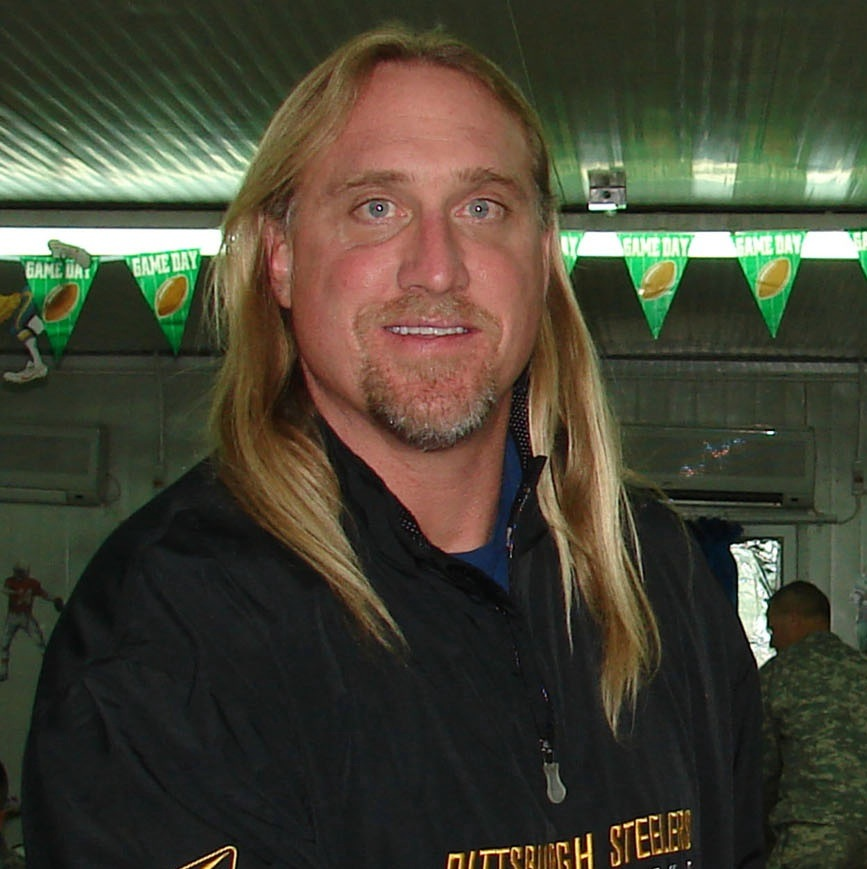
- Greene in 2007

No. 91
- Positions: Linebacker, defensive end

Personal information
- Born: July 31, 1962; Schenectady, New York, U.S.
- Died: December 21, 2020 (aged 58); Destin, Florida, U.S.
- Listed height: 6 ft 3 in (1.91 m)
- Listed weight: 247 lb (112 kg)

Career information
- High school: Granite City South (Granite City, Illinois)
- College: Auburn (1983–1984)
- NFL draft: 1985: 5th round, 113th overall pick

Career history

Playing
- Los Angeles Rams (1985–1992); Pittsburgh Steelers (1993–1995); Carolina Panthers (1996); San Francisco 49ers (1997); Carolina Panthers (1998–1999)

Coaching
- Green Bay Packers (2009–2013; OLB); New York Jets (2017–2018; OLB)

Awards and highlights
- As a player: NFL Defensive Player of the Year (NEA) (1996); UPI NFC Defensive Player of the Year (1996); 3× First-team All-Pro (1989, 1994, 1996); 5× Pro Bowl (1989, 1994–1996, 1998); 2× NFL sacks leader (1994, 1996); NFL 1990s All-Decade Team; Pittsburgh Steelers Hall of Honor; As a coach: Super Bowl champion (XLV)

Career NFL statistics
- Tackles: 773
- Sacks: 160
- Interceptions: 5
- Forced fumbles: 23
- Fumble recoveries: 26
- Defensive touchdowns: 3
- Stats at Pro Football Reference
- Pro Football Hall of Fame

Kevin Darwin Greene (July 31, 1962 – December 21, 2020) was an American professional football player who was a linebacker and defensive end for the Los Angeles Rams, Pittsburgh Steelers, Carolina Panthers, and San Francisco 49ers of the National Football League (NFL) from 1985 through 1999. He had 160 sacks in his career, which ranks third among NFL career sack leaders, and was voted to the NFL 1990s All-Decade Team. He was elected to the Pro Football Hall of Fame in 2016.

Greene played college football for the Auburn Tigers. He was a three-time All-Pro during his NFL playing career and was twice the league leader in sacks. He was later an outside linebackers coach for the Green Bay Packers from 2009 through 2013 and the New York Jets from 2017 through 2018.

== Early life ==
Greene was born on July 31, 1962, in Schenectady, New York. His father was a colonel in the army, making Greene an army brat. He began playing football on military bases. The Greene family moved to different bases and spent three years in Mannheim, Germany before they settled in Granite City, Illinois, in 1976.

Greene played football, basketball, and was a high jumper for the track team at Granite City High School. He graduated in 1980 and was inducted into the Granite City Sports Hall of Fame in 1998.

== College career ==
After graduating from high school, Greene enrolled at Auburn University and entered into the Reserve Officers' Training Corps (ROTC) basic training for the United States National Guard at Fort McClellan in Anniston, Alabama. He attempted to walk on to the Auburn Tigers in college football as a punter in 1980. He tried out again in 1983, and made the team. In 1984 he won the Zeke Smith Award as Defensive Player of the Year. He had 69 career tackles as an outside linebacker and 11 sacks his senior year where he led the Southeastern Conference and won the Defensive Player of the Year Award in 1984.

Greene earned a degree in criminal justice at Auburn. He completed ROTC while at Auburn and was commissioned a second lieutenant in the Alabama Army National Guard. After playing his first year in the NFL, during the off season, he graduated from the RC-1-86 Armor Officer Basic Course at Fort Knox. During his military career, he earned the rank of captain and completed airborne training at Fort Benning to become a paratrooper.

== Professional career ==
=== Los Angeles Rams ===
The Birmingham Stallions selected Greene in the 1985 USFL territorial draft. He was later selected by the Los Angeles Rams of the National Football League in the fifth round (113th overall) of the 1985 NFL draft. From 1985 through 1987, Greene played left defensive end in the Rams nickel defense and was second on the team in sacks in both 1986 and 1987. His first sack came in 1985, in a playoff game against the Dallas Cowboys, and it was in the defensive end role that the sack came. In 1988, Greene became the starting left outside linebacker in the Rams base defense that was enhanced by defensive coordinator Fritz Shurmur's Eagle 5-Linebacker defense which he used extensively from 1988 to 1990.

In 1988, Greene led the Rams with 16 1/2 sacks which was second overall in the NFL behind Reggie White. That total included 4 1/2 sacks against the San Francisco 49ers' Joe Montana in a key late-season game that the Rams had to win in order to make the playoffs, which they did.

In 1989, Greene made both the First and Second All-Pro Team and was named to the Pro Bowl for the first time with his second consecutive season of 16 1/2 sacks (4th in the NFL). Greene signed a three-year $2.5 million contract with the Rams prior to the 1990 season. His 13 sacks (tied for sixth in the NFL) in 1990 gave him 46 sacks for that three-year period, the most of any player in the NFL for that span.

In 1991, the Rams changed defenses and defensive coordinators. Jeff Fisher became the new defensive coordinator and switched the Rams to a 4–3 defense, a system Greene was unfamiliar with, after playing in a 3–4 defense since 1983. Although he had compiled 46 sacks during the previous three seasons, Greene was moved from left outside linebacker in a 3–4 to right defensive end in a 4–3. After five games Greene was moved to left linebacker for a month and a half and then due to injuries he was moved to left defensive end for the remainder of the seasons. In all, he started five games at right defensive end, five games at left linebacker and six games at left defensive end and even though he had a career-high in tackles for loss (8) he ended the year with only 3 sacks—his lowest total, by far, since his rookie season. The entire Rams' coaching staff was released after the 1991 season.

In 1992, the Rams hired Chuck Knox as head coach. The Rams remained a 4–3 defensive team under defensive coordinator George Dyer, and Greene continued to play left outside linebacker. His production returned as he led his team in both tackles and sacks. Greene accepted his new role saying, "On third downs I am still rushing the passer, but I would like to rush the passer more often, from more downs and distances, but I can't because of the role I am now asked to play". He finished the 1992 season with 10 sacks and Sports Illustrated's Paul Zimmerman picked Greene for his annual All-Pro team, citing Greene's coverage ability, "The OLB spot opposite Cox came down to the Eagles' Seth Joyner, my Player of the Year in last year, versus the Rams' Kevin Greene. I picked Greene. He had more coverage responsibility than ever before, and he did just fine. He was a consistent pass rusher. Dick Selcer, his linebacker coach added, "Kevin's a more complete player than he is given credit for, people only seem to notice the home run, but not seem to see the singles.

=== Pittsburgh Steelers ===
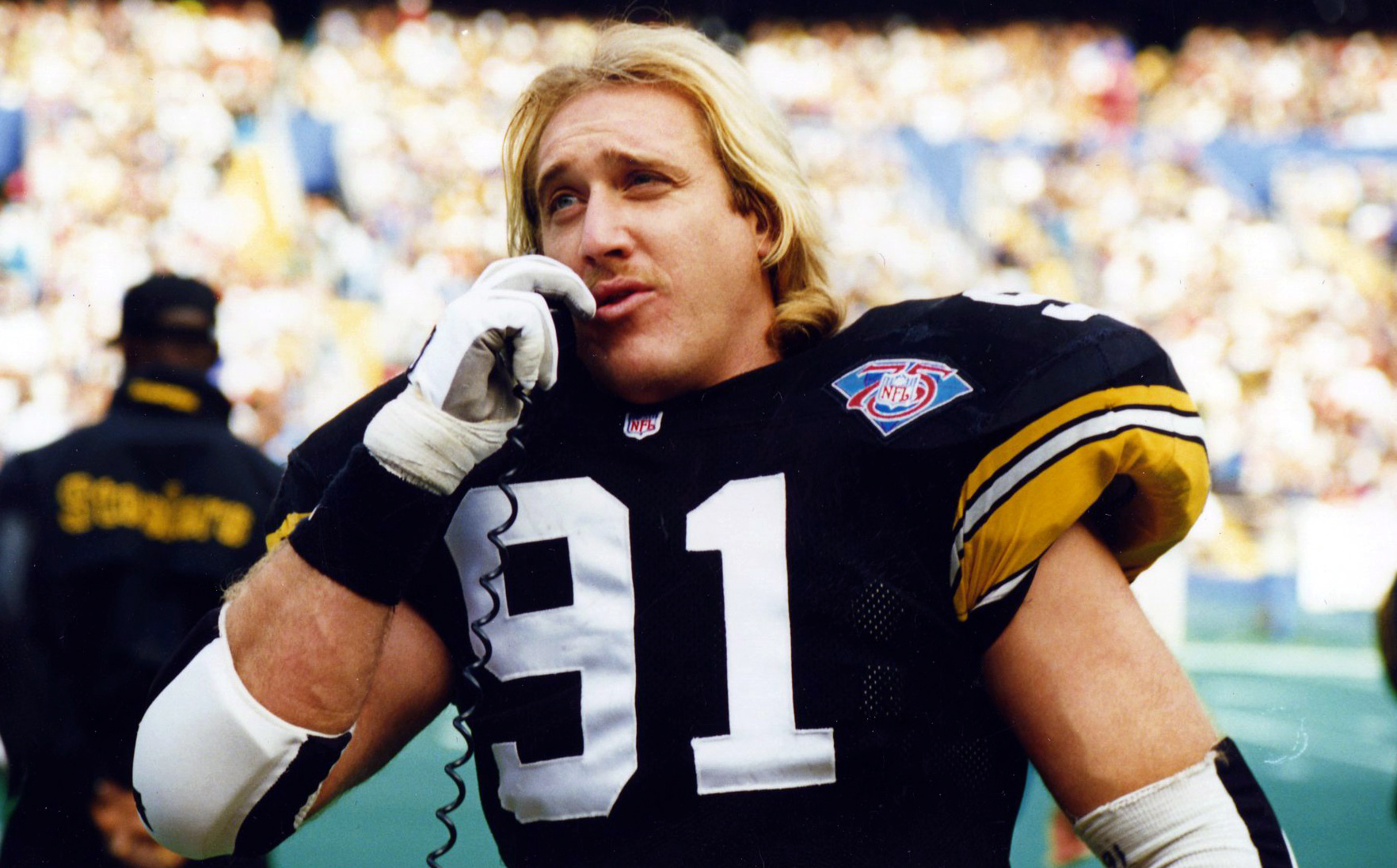
Greene talks to the Pittsburgh Steelers defensive coordinator during a game against the Miami Dolphins at Three Rivers Stadium on November 20, 1994.

In 1993, Greene sought out teams that employed a 3–4 system in the first year of free agency. He visited the Green Bay Packers where his former defensive coordinator Fritz Shurmur was employed as the defensive coordinator, but they were a 4–3 team. He then visited the Pittsburgh Steelers, a 3–4 team. Dom Capers was the defensive coordinator. Greene signed a three-year, $5.35 million free-agent contract with the Pittsburgh Steelers. Returning to his left outside linebacker position, he teamed up with Greg Lloyd to form what head coach Bill Cowher called his "bookends" in the team's "Blitzburgh" defense; teammates including the biracial Rod Woodson referred to the white Greene and African American Lloyd as "Salt & Pepper".

In his first year with the Steelers, he had a solid season with 12 1/2 sacks which tied him for seventh in the league. The following season, Greene was a consensus All-Pro choice in 1994 as he led the NFL in sacks (14) and made another appearance in the Pro Bowl. Additionally, Greene was voted the NFLPA AFC Linebacker of the Year (tied with Junior Seau) for the first time in his career. In 1995, he went to his third Pro Bowl, where he finished with nine sacks and played in Super Bowl XXX, a loss to the Dallas Cowboys. During Greene's three years with the Steelers, the defense allowed only 3.48 yards per rush, best in the NFL. As part of that defense, a Steelers team that also led the NFL in sacks with 139 over the same three season period, Dick LeBeau said, "Kevin Greene is a great player against the run, and one of the best pass rushers in NFL history. Greene is almost unblockable."

Greene later stated that he had the "time of his life" playing for the Steelers and decided to receive his Hall of Fame ring from the team despite only playing three of his 15 years in Pittsburgh. His departure from Pittsburgh was due to the salary cap and the Steelers wanting to focus on younger players; Greene, though understanding of the business decision, felt hurt from the organization but continued to hold them in high regard.

=== Later career ===
On May 21, 1996, Greene signed with the Carolina Panthers (a two-year, $2 million deal) following their 1995 inaugural season and helped them reach the NFC Championship Game, where the team lost to the eventual Super Bowl XXXI champion Green Bay Packers. In 1996, he was named the NFC Linebacker of the Year and received the NEA Defensive Player of the Year Award. In addition, the NFL Alumni voted Greene the NFL Linebacker of the Year Award. He was also voted the NFC Player of the Year by the Washington D.C. Touchdown Club. Additionally, Greene set an NFL record with five consecutive multi-sack games and finished leading the NFL in sacks for the second time in three years with 14 1/2. Along the way he was a consensus All-Pro in 1996 for the second time in three years. Greene was selected to his fourth Pro Bowl. Said by Panther teammate Dwight Stone to be, along with Sam Mills, the most "professional guy" on the 1996 Panther team.

After one season with the Panthers and a dispute with the organization, he was cut by the team and signed a six-year, $13 million contract with the San Francisco 49ers that included a $750,000 signing bonus on August 26, 1997. With the 49ers, Greene had 10.5 sacks. Greene was called on to play the "elephant" role with the 49ers, the player to rush the passer and come in the games on likely passing downs. While doing so, he chipped in on the run game as the 49ers allowed 3.5 yards a rush and Greene had 10.5 of the 49ers 54 sacks.

After the 1997 holdout and a year with the 49ers, Greene re-signed with the Panthers on February 28, 1998. In December 1998, he attacked Kevin Steele, Carolina's linebacker coach, during a game; he received a one-game suspension from the team. After the season, Greene was named the NFC Linebacker of the year by the National Football League Players Association (NFLPA). Greene was also named to the Pro Bowl after the 1998 season, bringing his Pro Bowl total to five. Greene was tied for third in the NFL for sacks, after Michael Sinclair (16 1/2 sacks), Reggie White (16 sacks), and tied with Michael Strahan who also totaled 15 sacks. As of 2023, Greene's 15.0 sacks in 1998 remains tied with Greg Hardy's 2013 season for the Panthers' franchise record.

Greene retired after registering 12 sacks (good for seventh in the NFL) playing as a 4–3 outside linebacker in 1999; he finished his career as a five-time Pro Bowler and the NFL's third all-time sack leader with 160, behind only Bruce Smith and Reggie White. He also finished as the NFL's all-time leader in sacks by a linebacker, ahead of players such as Lawrence Taylor, Derrick Thomas, Rickey Jackson, and Andre Tippett; Greene is also one of only four players to lead the NFL in sacks in multiple seasons ('94 with the Steelers and '96 with the Panthers). He is also tied for second in career safeties with three and third all-time in fumble recoveries with 26 (which he returned for 136 yards and two touchdowns). During his career, Greene recorded five interceptions, returning them for 53 yards and a touchdown, and he is one of three players to record 10 or more sacks in at least 10 different seasons; he averaged over 10 sacks a year for 15 seasons. Greene ended his career with 160 sacks, 62.5 tackles of running backs behind the line of scrimmage, 23 forced fumbles, 26 recovered fumbles, and three defensive touchdowns, and three safeties. Greene opted for retirement while still playing at a high level rather than becoming a "designated pass rusher".

Greene played in 228 games in his 15-year career; in the modern era (since 1970), only five other linebackers (Clay Matthews Jr., Bill Romanowski, Ray Lewis, London Fletcher, & James Harrison) had longer careers. He was among the NFL's top 10 in sacks eight times, leading the NFL twice. For 11 out of his 15 years, he led his club in sacks. He also played in six conference championships in his 15 seasons. Greene is considered to be one of the greatest pass rushers of all time. He was quoted as saying of his career, "I was an outside linebacker in a 3–4, so I actually had coverage responsibilities. So my rush was more limited. But, still, I think my numbers match up pretty good, even with those that rushed the passer every passing down."

After being a finalist for five consecutive years, Greene was inducted into the Pro Football Hall of Fame in 2016 and his bust was sculpted by Scott Myers.

== Professional wrestling career ==
Greene made several appearances with the professional wrestling promotion World Championship Wrestling (WCW) during the late-1990s. He was one of several celebrities brought in by WCW president Eric Bischoff to help generate mainstream publicity for the company.

Greene made his first appearance with WCW at the TBS television special Clash of the Champions XXXII in January 1996, accompanying Hulk Hogan and Randy Savage to ringside for their match against Ric Flair and The Giant. Following the match, Greene helped Hogan fight off an attempted ambush by Brian Pillman and The Zodiac.

In June 1996, Greene wrestled his first match for WCW at its Great American Bash pay-per-view. Greene teamed with his fellow NFL alumnus Steve McMichael - who had joined WCW as a color commentator the prior year - to face Four Horsemen members Ric Flair and Arn Anderson, who in the storyline had incurred McMichael's ire after Flair repeatedly flirted with his wife Debra, leading McMichael to bring in Greene to help defend her honor. McMichael and Greene were accompanied to ringside by their wives along with wrestler Randy Savage, who was presented as their coach. The match ended when Debra and Tara Greene were chased backstage by Flair's valets Miss Elizabeth and Woman, only for Debra to return carrying a briefcase containing a large amount of money (implicitly a bribe from Flair) and a Four Horsemen t-shirt. After Debra showed McMichael the contents of the briefcase, he took the briefcase and hit Greene with it, enabling Flair to pin Greene. McMichael then donned the t-shirt, marking the beginning of his membership in the Four Horsemen.

Greene returned to World Championship Wrestling in May the following year, teaming with Ric Flair and Roddy Piper to face the villainous New World Order (Kevin Nash, Scott Hall, and Syxx) in the main event of the Slamboree pay-per-view. The match ended when Greene pinned Syxx after giving him a running powerslam. The following month, at that year's Great American Bash, Greene faced Steve McMichael in a match resulting from McMichael's betrayal of him at the prior year's event. The match ended when Jeff Jarrett attempted to hit Greene with a briefcase, only to accidentally hit McMichael, enabling Greene to pin him.

Greene returned to World Championship Wrestling for a third and final time in 1998. On the June 22, 1998, episode of WCW Monday Nitro, Greene made a surprise return; as he gave an interview, he was confronted by Curt Hennig and Rick Rude, who distracted him while The Giant attacked him from behind. The altercation led to Greene facing The Giant in the main event of Nitro. Greene won the resultant match by disqualification after Hennig and Rude interfered, after which they attacked Greene until his former Los Angeles Rams teammate Bill Goldberg came to his assistance. Greene faced The Giant in a rematch at the following month's Bash at the Beach pay-per-view, with The Giant pinning him following a chokeslam.

In Greene's contract for 1997, the 49ers included a stipulation prohibiting him from wrestling, as did the Panthers the following year. As a result, his professional wrestling career came to an end in 1998. Greene wrestled a total of five matches between June 16, 1996, and July 12, 1998, four of them on pay-per-view. During his brief career, he "share[d] the ring with some of the biggest names in sports-entertainment." Professional wrestling pundit R. D. Reynolds described him as "a pretty decent wrestler given his level of experience". WCW president Eric Bischoff praised Greene's performances, stating that Greene "poured himself into the training for our show, trying to be as good as he could possibly be". Following Greene's death in 2020, multiple wrestlers paid tribute to him, including Ric Flair, Mick Foley, and Sean "Syxx" Waltman. In addition to wrestling himself, Greene encouraged former teammate Bill Goldberg to pursue a career in professional wrestling. In a retrospective interview about the Steelers "Blitzburgh" zone blitz in 2024, Greene's former teammate Levon Kirkland referred to Greene as "a professional wrestler playing football".

== Coaching career ==
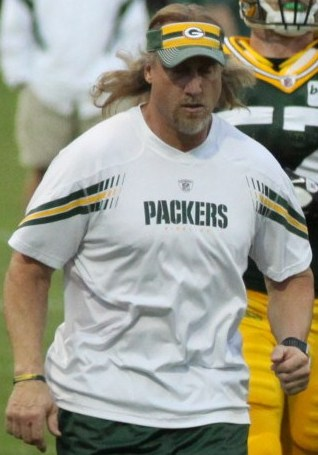
Greene with the Packers in 2011

During the 2008 season Greene, along with former Steeler Jason Gildon, served an internship for the Pittsburgh Steelers as an assistant linebackers coach during training camp. On January 26, 2009, Greene was hired as an outside linebackers coach for the Green Bay Packers by Dom Capers, under whom Greene had played. The Packers were transitioning into a 3–4 base defense from their traditional 4–3 base. During this time, according to Clay Matthews Jr., Greene would reiterate to his linebackers every single day: "Establish the violent, physical nature of the game." On February 6, 2011, the Packers won Super Bowl XLV, the first time Greene had ever been part of an NFL championship team; between the third and fourth quarters, Greene famously motivated Matthews with an "It is time!" speech moments before Matthews forced a fumble-turnover to start the fourth quarter that helped Green Bay seal the game.

He left the Packers in 2013 to coach high school football where his son played at Niceville High School. On January 17, 2014, it was announced that he would be stepping away from coaching "in order to spend more time with (his) wife, Tara, and (his) children, Gavin and Gabrielle". He hoped to return to coaching after his children went to college.

In January 2017, the New York Jets hired Greene as their outside linebackers coach. Greene replaced Mark Collins, who was one of five assistants not brought back by head coach Todd Bowles for the 2017 season. After Adam Gase was hired in 2019, Greene was not included in the new coaching staff.

== Personal life and death ==
Greene and his wife Tara had a son, Gavin, and a daughter, Gabrielle.

Greene used a multi-component diet to help his performance.

Greene died of a heart attack at age 58 at his home in Destin, Florida, on the morning of December 21, 2020.

== See also ==
- List of gridiron football players who became professional wrestlers
