= 1996 All-Pro Team =

Official list of the best NFL players in 1996

The 1996 All-Pro Team is composed of the National Football League players that were named to the Associated Press, Pro Football Writers Association, and The Sporting News All-Pro Teams in 1996. Both first and second teams are listed for the AP team. These are the three teams that are included in Total Football II: The Official Encyclopedia of the National Football League. In 1996, the Pro Football Writers Association and Pro Football Weekly combined their All-pro teams, a practice with continues through 2008. In 1996, the AP added a new position, that of "fullback", a primarily blocking position.

== Teams ==
Offense
Position	First team	Second team
Quarterback	Brett Favre, Green Bay Packers (AP, PFWA, TSN)	John Elway, Denver Broncos (AP-2)
Running back	Jerome Bettis, Pittsburgh Steelers (AP); Barry Sanders, Detroit Lions (PFWA, TSN); Terrell Davis, Denver Broncos (AP, PFWA, TSN)	Terry Allen, Washington Redskins (AP-2); Barry Sanders, Detroit Lions (AP-2)
Fullback	Larry Centers, Arizona Cardinals (AP)	Mike Alstott, Tampa Bay Buccaneers (AP-2)
Wide receiver	Herman Moore, Detroit Lions (AP, TSN); Jerry Rice, San Francisco 49ers (AP, PFWA, TSN); Carl Pickens, Cincinnati Bengals (PFWA)	Tony Martin, San Diego Chargers (AP-2); Carl Pickens, Cincinnati Bengals (AP-2)
Tight end	Shannon Sharpe, Denver Broncos (AP, PFWA, TSN)	Wesley Walls, Carolina Panthers (AP-2)
Tackle	Gary Zimmerman, Denver Broncos (AP, PFWA, TSN); Willie Roaf, New Orleans Saints (PFWA, TSN); Erik Williams, Dallas Cowboys (AP)	Bruce Armstrong, New England Patriots (AP-2); Willie Roaf, New Orleans Saints (AP-2)
Guard	Larry Allen, Dallas Cowboys (AP, PFWA, TSN); Randall McDaniel, Minnesota Vikings (AP, PFWA, TSN)	Bruce Matthews, Houston Oilers (AP-2); Steve Wisniewski, Oakland Raiders (AP-2)
Center	Dermontti Dawson, Pittsburgh Steelers (AP, PFWA, TSN)	Mark Stepnoski, Houston Oilers (AP-2)

Special teams
Position	First team	Second team
Kicker	Cary Blanchard, Indianapolis Colts (AP, PFWA, TSN)	John Kasay, Carolina Panthers (AP-2)
Punter	Chris Gardocki, Indianapolis Colts (AP-t, PFWA-t, TSN); Matt Turk, Washington Redskins (AP-t, PFWA-t)	
Kick returner	Michael Bates, Carolina Panthers (AP, PFWA, TSN)	Dave Meggett, New England Patriots (AP-2)
Punt returner	Desmond Howard, Green Bay Packers (PFWA, TSN)	
Special teams	Jim Schwantz, Dallas Cowboys (PFWA)	

Defense
Position	First team	Second team
Defensive end	Alfred Williams, Denver Broncos (AP, PFWA, TSN); Bruce Smith, Buffalo Bills (AP, PFWA, TSN)	Reggie White, Green Bay Packers (AP-2); Tony Tolbert, Dallas Cowboys (AP-2)
Defensive tackle	John Randle, Minnesota Vikings (AP, PFWA, TSN); Bryant Young, San Francisco 49ers (AP, PFWA, TSN)	Chester McGlockton, Oakland Raiders (AP-2); Cortez Kennedy, Seattle Seahawks (AP-2)
Middle linebacker	Junior Seau, San Diego Chargers (AP, TSN); Sam Mills, New Orleans Saints (AP, PFWA)	Hardy Nickerson, Tampa Bay Buccaneers (AP-2); Levon Kirkland, Pittsburgh Steelers (AP-2)
Outside linebacker	Chad Brown, Pittsburgh Steelers (AP, PFWA, TSN); Kevin Greene, Carolina Panthers (AP, PFWA); Lamar Lathon, Carolina Panthers (TSN)	Derrick Thomas, Kansas City Chiefs (AP-2); Lamar Lathon, Carolina Panthers (AP-2)
Cornerback	Ashley Ambrose, Cincinnati Bengals (AP); Dale Carter, Kansas City Chiefs (TSN); Aeneas Williams, Arizona Cardinals (PFWA); Deion Sanders, Dallas Cowboys (AP, PFWA, TSN)	Dale Carter, Kansas City Chiefs (AP-2); Aeneas Williams, Arizona Cardinals (AP-2)
Safety	LeRoy Butler, Green Bay Packers (AP, PFWA, TSN); Darren Woodson, Dallas Cowboys (AP, PFWA, TSN)	Merton Hanks, San Francisco 49ers (AP-2); Steve Atwater, Denver Broncos (AP-2)

== Key ==
- AP = Associated Press first-team All-Pro
- AP-t = Tied for first-team All-Pro in the AP vote
- AP-2 = Associated Press second-team All-Pro
- PFWA = Pro Football Writers Association All-NFL
- TSN = The Sporting News All-Pro
