= Wesley Walls =

American football player (born 1966)

No. 89, 85
- Position: Tight end

Personal information
- Born: March 26, 1966 (age 60); Batesville, Mississippi, U.S.
- Listed height: 6 ft 5 in (1.96 m)
- Listed weight: 240 lb (109 kg)

Career information
- High school: Pontotoc (Pontotoc, Mississippi)
- College: Ole Miss (1985–1988)
- NFL draft: 1989: 2nd round, 56th overall pick

Career history
- San Francisco 49ers (1989–1993); New Orleans Saints (1994–1995); Carolina Panthers (1996–2002); Green Bay Packers (2003)

Awards and highlights
- Super Bowl champion (XXIV); 3× Second-team All-Pro (1996, 1997, 1999); 5× Pro Bowl (1996–1999, 2001); Carolina Panthers Hall of Honor; First-team All-American (1988); First-team All-SEC (1988)

Career NFL statistics
- Games: 196
- Games started: 116
- Receptions: 450
- Receiving yards: 5,291
- Receiving touchdowns: 54
- Stats at Pro Football Reference
- College Football Hall of Fame

Charles Wesley Walls (born March 26, 1966) is an American former professional football player who was a tight end in the National Football League (NFL) for 14 seasons.

== Early life ==
Walls played high school football in Pontotoc, Mississippi. He spent his first three years as a quarterback at South Pontotoc High School. Before his senior year, he transferred to Pontotoc High School, a rival high school. Walls' transfer caused such an uproar in the area, the case went to court, and Walls' eligibility for baseball and basketball was denied. He switched to fullback his senior year, and made the all-state team.

== College career ==
Walls' ability at Pontotoc High earned him a scholarship to the University of Mississippi. Where he played defensive end for three years, and became a linebacker in his senior year. In addition, he played tight end. In a rare move under today's football system, Walls actually started both positions in a game against Memphis State University. After realizing that playing both offense and defense would be too much, he became the team's permanent tight end. He was still utilized on third-down situations as a pass rusher, however. He earned All-America honors as a senior. Walls was elected to the College Football Hall of Fame in 2014.

== Professional career ==
Pre-draft measurables
Height	Weight	40-yard dash	10-yard split	20-yard split
6 ft 4 1/2 in (1.94 m)	240 lb (109 kg)	4.77 s	1.64 s	2.77 s
All values from NFL Combine

Walls was selected in the second round (56th overall) by the San Francisco 49ers in the 1989 NFL draft. Despite early success in his career, including catching a nine-yard pass in the 49ers 55–10 rout of the Denver Broncos in Super Bowl XXIV, he was second on the depth chart behind All-Pro Brent Jones. He spent the entire 1992 NFL season and all but 6 games of the 1993 NFL season on injured reserve because of nagging shoulder injuries. In 1994, he signed as a free agent with the New Orleans Saints. Walls spent two seasons with the Saints, setting the team record for tight end receptions in 1995 with 57. He then signed a deal with the Carolina Panthers to become their starting tight end. It was in Carolina that Walls finally broke out as a player. He made the Pro Bowl five times between 1996 and 2001, only missing it during the 2000 season due to injuries that kept him out for 8 games. While at Carolina, he was also the back-up punter to Ken Walter. After Carolina declined to re-sign him in 2003, he signed with the Green Bay Packers, mostly backing up Bubba Franks, and retired the following year. Walls finished his career with 450 catches for 5,291 yards and 54 touchdowns.

On July 9, 2019, the Panthers announced that Walls would be inducted into the team's Hall of Honor along with Jake Delhomme, Jordan Gross, and Steve Smith Sr.

== NFL career statistics ==
Legend
	Won the Super Bowl
**Bold**	Career high

=== Regular season ===
Year	Team	GP	Receiving						Fumbles	
Year	Team	GP	Rec	Yds	Avg	Lng	TD	FD	Fum	Lost
1989	SF	16	4	16	4.0	9	1	0	0	0
1990	SF	16	5	27	5.4	11	0	0	0	0
1991	SF	15	2	24	12.0	21	0	1	0	0
1992	SF	0	Did not play due to injury							
1993	SF	6	0	0	0	0	0	0	0	0
1994	NO	15	38	406	10.7	31	4	23	0	0
1995	NO	16	57	694	12.2	29	4	40	1	1
1996	CAR	16	61	713	11.7	40	10	44	0	0
1997	CAR	15	58	746	12.9	52	6	41	0	0
1998	CAR	14	49	506	10.3	30	5	32	0	0
1999	CAR	16	63	822	13.0	37	12	47	1	1
2000	CAR	8	31	422	13.6	54	2	20	0	0
2001	CAR	14	43	452	10.5	25	5	20	0	0
2002	CAR	15	19	241	12.7	27	4	12	0	0
2003	GB	14	20	222	11.1	36	1	9	0	0
Career		190	450	5,291	11.8	54	54	289	2	2

== Later career ==
Following his retirement from the NFL, Walls was involved in business ventures and charitable work in the Charlotte community and his home state of Mississippi.

=== College Football Playoff selection committee ===
In March 2025, Walls was named one of five new members of the College Football Playoff (CFP) selection committee, appointed by CFP executive director Rich Clark ahead of the 2025 season. He joined the committee alongside fellow new members Mark Dantonio, Damon Evans, Ivan Maisel, and Chris Massaro, beginning a three-year term.

Walls is one of two former Ole Miss Rebels to serve on the committee since the CFP's inception in 2013, the other being Archie Manning, who sat on the inaugural 2014 committee. The committee is responsible for ranking the top 25 teams each week late in the season and selecting and seeding the teams in the playoff bracket.

Walls returned to the committee for the 2026 season, serving as one of two former players on the 13-member panel alongside Randall McDaniel.
