= Stanley Clark School =

Private school in Indiana, United States

Coordinates: 41.642596°N 86.236809°W

The Stanley Clark School is a private school in South Bend, Indiana serving children preschool through 8th grade. Stanley Clark School has been recognized by the Blue Ribbon Schools Program, the highest award an American school can receive. The school also practices the Reggio Emilia approach, which is an educational philosophy directed at the development of young children.

In 1958, Mary (Mollie) Bernard, supported by her husband, Leon, founded the Mary Reid Cleland School. The school was named for Mary's grandmother, a school teacher in Scotland. While first founded for kindergarten and 1st grade, the school added grades each year, eventually serving grades K–8. Mary's mission was to establish an alternative education for South Bend families at a time when public and parochial classrooms were frequently overcrowded and failed to provide the quality education Mary wished for her own children as well as others in the community. The result was a private institution that became a mainstay in the South Bend community. The Cleland School was renamed the Stanley Clark School in 1964 in honor of a prominent physician in the South Bend area.

The headmaster is Dr. Ottenweller As of the 2026 - 2027 school year, the tuition cost is around $20,000. The Stanley Clark School is known around the South Bend and Michiana areas for excellence not only in academics, but also for sports and other activities. Athletic activities are offered on a seasonal basis, and students may choose to participate competitively if they wish. Sports offered at Stanley Clark are ice hockey, basketball, dance, lacrosse, cross-country, volleyball, soccer, tennis, and intramural sports. During the summer, camp programs spanning a variety of subjects are offered to children up to age 16.,

The Stanley Clark School also has many clubs and teams, including Speech Team, Science Olympiad, MathCounts, and Spelling Bee. The school has done very well in all of these areas, and frequently travels to competitions held among area schools.

== Awards and recognition ==
During the 1985–86 school year, the Stanley Clark School was recognized with the Blue Ribbon School Award of Excellence by the United States Department of Education.

The Stanley Clark Science Olympiad team received 1st place in the state competition in 2008, and moved on to the Nationals in Washington D.C. The team finished in 21st place overall out of the 59 teams participating in the 2008 National Science Olympiad Tournament.
