= Andre Royal =

American football player (born 1972)

No. 58, 56
- Position: Linebacker

Personal information
- Born: December 1, 1972 (age 53); Northport, Alabama, U.S.
- Listed height: 6 ft 2 in (1.88 m)
- Listed weight: 220 lb (100 kg)

Career information
- High school: Tuscaloosa (AL)
- College: Alabama
- NFL draft: 1995: undrafted

Career history
- Cleveland Browns (1995)*; Carolina Panthers (1995–1997); New Orleans Saints (1998)*; Indianapolis Colts (1998–1999)
- * Offseason or practice squad member only

Awards and highlights
- National champion (1992)

Career NFL statistics
- Tackles: 140
- Sacks: 6
- Fumble recoveries: 2
- Forced fumbles: 4
- Stats at Pro Football Reference

Andre Tierre Royal (born December 1, 1972) is an American former professional football player who was a linebacker for five seasons with the Carolina Panthers and Indianapolis Colts of the National Football League (NFL). He played college football for the Alabama Crimson Tide. In the NFL, Royal had 140 career tackle s, 6 solo sacks, 4 forced fumbles and 2 fumble recoveries. Royal was traded to the Indianapolis Colts following several off-the-field incidents prior to the start of the season with the New Orleans Saints.

== College career ==
Royal played at the University of Alabama under head coach Gene Stallings. He was part of the 1992-1993 national championship team. He later took part in the 1995 Senior Bowl.

== Professional career ==
Royal, signed a guaranteed $4.085 million contract with the Saints as a free agent after previously attaining All-Pro status with the Carolina Panthers, and was expected to start at strong-side linebacker. He was replaced in the Saints' final exhibition game by backup Keith Mitchell.

After reporting to Saints training camp 20 or 30 players including Royal, were involved in a team publicized hazing event in La Crosse, Wisconsin. Several rookies, including Cam Cleeland, were hit with a pillowcase filled with coins as they had to walk through 20 to 30 players lined up on each side of a dormitory hallway.

Six players were singled out and named in a lawsuit including: Royal, Brady Smith, Brian Jones, Isaac Davis, Troy Davis, and Keith Mitchell. Defensive line coach, Walt Corey was also named as a defendant. Royal admitted to participating in the incident but said he did not hit the rookies with any objects as the defendants were accused of doing.

The Saints' settled with the injured player. The settlement covered all the players except Royal whose suit was dismissed.

After being accused of faking a head injury by Coach Mike Ditka in a team meeting; Ditka and Royal engaged in a highly publicized and televised shouting match. Ditka fined Royal $50,000 which Royal appealed to the NFL. Ditka was found to have been "baiting a player" and was fined $50,000.00 instead.

In the trade with the Colts, the Saints acquired tight end Scott Slutzker from the Colts for Royal, having been short-handed at that position because of injuries, including that of No. 2 draft pick Cam Cleeland.

Royal went on to star on the field for the Indianapolis Colts leading the Defense across from Offensive All-Pro, Peyton Manning. However, after playing two seasons with the Colts, Royal's NFL Career came to an end from the effects of several head injuries.

Royal had offered to voluntarily give up the last 2 years' salary on his four-year contract with the Colts in exchange for being allowed to retire at the end of the first season with the Colts.

Despite Royal's official retirement from the NFL in 2001, several teams approached him about returning to the NFL including the Dallas Cowboys, who offered Royal a 2-year deal following his retirement.

Although Andre Royal never played football before moving to Northport, Alabama during his 8th grade year in junior high school, he went on to earn a four-year college scholarship to the University of Alabama where he studied criminal justice and played on the 1992 NCAA Division I National Football Championship Team. He also had an all-pro career in the NFL, playing on the inaugural team of the Carolina Panthers and in several NFC Championship games.

Royal returned to the University of Alabama to complete and earn his college degree in 2014.
