= Lamar Lathon =

American football player (born 1967)

No. 57
- Position: Linebacker

Personal information
- Born: December 23, 1967 (age 58); Wharton, Texas, U.S.
- Listed height: 6 ft 4 in (1.93 m)
- Listed weight: 265 lb (120 kg)

Career information
- High school: Wharton (TX)
- College: Houston
- NFL draft: 1990: 1st round, 15th overall pick

Career history
- Houston Oilers (1990–1994); Carolina Panthers (1995–1998)

Awards and highlights
- Second-team All-Pro (1996); Pro Bowl (1996)

Career NFL statistics
- Games played: 115
- Games started: 92
- Tackles: 414
- Sacks: 37.5
- Interceptions: 4
- Touchdowns: 3
- Stats at Pro Football Reference

Lamar Lavante Lathon (born December 23, 1967) is an American former professional football player who was a linebacker in the National Football League (NFL). He played college football for the Houston Cougars and was selected by the Houston Oilers in the first round of the 1990 NFL draft. Lathon played eight seasons in the league. He last played in 1998 with the Carolina Panthers.

== See also ==
- 1989 Houston Cougars football team
