= Tim Morabito =

American football player (born 1973)

No. 93, 95, 90
- Position: Defensive tackle

Personal information
- Born: October 12, 1973 (age 53); Garnerville, New York, U.S.
- Listed height: 6 ft 3 in (1.91 m)
- Listed weight: 296 lb (134 kg)

Career information
- High school: St. Joseph Regional
- College: Boston College
- NFL draft: 1996: undrafted

Career history
- Cincinnati Bengals (1996); Carolina Panthers (1997–2000); Jacksonville Jaguars (2002); Nashville Kats (2005)

Career NFL statistics
- Tackles: 95
- Sacks: 2.5
- Fumble recoveries: 2
- Stats at Pro Football Reference

Career AFL statistics
- Tackles: 4
- Stats at ArenaFan.com

Timothy Robert Morabito (born October 12, 1973) is an American former professional football player who was a defensive tackle in the National Football League. He played college football for the Boston College Eagles. He played in the NFL for the Cincinnati Bengals in 1996 and the Carolina Panthers from 1997 to 2000. He was signed with the Jacksonville Jaguars in 2002, but he did not play.
