= Walter Rasby =

American football player (born 1972)

No. 84, 89, 88, 86, 87
- Position: Tight end

Personal information
- Born: September 7, 1972 (age 54); Washington, North Carolina, U.S.
- Listed height: 6 ft 3 in (1.91 m)
- Listed weight: 252 lb (114 kg)

Career information
- College: Wake Forest
- NFL draft: 1994: undrafted

Career history
- Pittsburgh Steelers (1994); Carolina Panthers (1995–1997); Detroit Lions (1998–2000); Washington Redskins (2001–2002); New Orleans Saints (2003); Washington Redskins (2004); Pittsburgh Steelers (2004); New England Patriots (2006)*; New York Jets (2006)*
- * Offseason or practice squad member only

Career NFL statistics
- Receptions: 64
- Receiving yards: 584
- Touchdowns: 5
- Stats at Pro Football Reference

Walter Herbert Rasby (born September 7, 1972) is an American former professional football player who was a tight end for 11 seasons with seven teams in the National Football League (NFL) from 1994 to 2006. He played college football for the Wake Forest Demon Deacons.

== Biography ==
Walter Rasby attended Wake Forest University, playing college football for the Demon Deacons. He was signed by the Pittsburgh Steelers in 1994 After, Pittsburgh he played for the Carolina Panthers and Detroit Lions. He was signed to the Washington Redskins in 2001. After this he was signed to the New Orleans Saints, and in 2004 re-signed with the Steelers. He was signed by both the New England Patriots and New York Jets in the year 2006.
