= Bucky Greeley =

American football player (born 1972)

Profile
- Position: Center

Personal information
- Born: July 30, 1972 (age 54); Wilkes-Barre, Pennsylvania, U.S.
- Listed height: 6 ft 2 in (1.88 m)
- Listed weight: 285 lb (129 kg)

Career information
- High school: James M. Coughlin (Wilkes-Barre)
- College: Penn State
- NFL draft: 1995: undrafted

Career history
- Chicago Bears (1995)*; Denver Broncos (1996)*; Carolina Panthers (1996–1998)
- * Offseason or practice squad member only
- Stats at Pro Football Reference

Paul Domero "Bucky" Greeley (born July 30, 1972) is an American former professional football player who was a center for the Carolina Panthers of the National Football League (NFL) from 1996 to 1998. He played college football for the Penn State Nittany Lions. While at Penn State he won a Rose Bowl when Penn State beat Oregon with a final score of 38-20.
