= Shawn King =

American football player (born 1972)

No. 96
- Position: Defensive end

Personal information
- Born: June 24, 1972 (age 54); West Monroe, Louisiana, U.S.
- Listed height: 6 ft 3 in (1.91 m)
- Listed weight: 290 lb (132 kg)

Career information
- High school: West Monroe
- College: Louisiana–Monroe
- NFL draft: 1995: 2nd round, 36th overall pick

Career history
- Carolina Panthers (1995–1998); Indianapolis Colts (1999–2000); Tampa Bay Storm (2004); Orlando Predators (2004)

Career NFL statistics
- Tackles: 74
- Sacks: 8.5
- Interceptions: 1
- Stats at Pro Football Reference
- Stats at ArenaFan.com

Shawn King (born June 24, 1972) is an American former professional football player who was a defensive end in the National Football League (NFL) for the Carolina Panthers and Indianapolis Colts. He played college football for the Louisiana–Monroe Warhawks. He is best remembered for his numerous suspensions due to violating the NFL's drug policy. He was a 1994 First Team All IFA selection

== NFL career ==
Shawn King was selected in the second round of the 1995 draft by the Carolina Panthers. King's first drug violation came in 1995 during his rookie training camp after testing positive for marijuana. King played in 13 games his rookie season and in all 16 games the following season. However, after testing positive again, King was suspended for the first six games of the 1997 season, only appearing in 9 games. After yet another positive test, King found himself suspended for the entire 1998 season. Prior to the 1999 season, King signed a three-year, $6 million contract with the Indianapolis Colts and started 8 of the team's first 9 games, but was suspended again (along with teammate Tito Wooten), this time for four games due to showing up late to a meeting. The Colts later cut King and he was suspended yet again by the league for 12 months for another drug violation and missed the entire 2000 season. Though he was reinstated in January 2001, King chose to retire from the NFL citing the league's drug policy as a reason. After four seasons of retirement, King signed on to play with the AFL's Tampa Bay Storm for the 2004 AFL season, after which he left pro football for good.

== NFL career statistics ==
Legend
**Bold**	Career high

Year	Team	Games		Tackles					Interceptions					Fumbles			
Year	Team	GP	GS	Cmb	Solo	Ast	Sck	TFL	Int	Yds	TD	Lng	PD	FF	FR	Yds	TD
1995	CAR	14	0	8	6	2	2.0	-	0	0	0	0	-	0	0	0	0
1996	CAR	**16**	0	18	13	5	**3.0**	-	**1**	**1**	0	**1**	-	**1**	**1**	**12**	**1**
1997	CAR	9	2	11	10	1	2.0	-	0	0	0	0	-	0	0	0	0
1999	IND	9	**8**	**37**	**28**	**9**	1.5	**8**	0	0	0	0	**4**	0	0	0	0
		48	10	74	57	17	8.5	8	1	1	0	1	4	1	1	12	1

== Suspensions ==
Shawn King was active in the NFL for six seasons from 1995 to 2000. However, due to suspensions, King missed 42 games, including the entire 1998 and 2000 seasons. King retired from the NFL in January 2001 shortly after the league reinstated him due to his problems with the drug policy.

- 1995 - Placed in the NFL's intervention program after violating the NFL's drug policy
- 1997 - Suspended for six games during the 1997 season due to violating the NFL's drug policy
- 1998 - Suspended for the entire 1998 season due to violating the NFL's drug policy
- 1999 - Suspended for four games during the 1999 season due after missing bed check and showing up late to a team meeting
- 2000 - Suspended for the entire 2000 season after violating NFL's drug policy
