= Damon Pieri =

American football player (born 1970)

No. 26, 27
- Position: Safety

Personal information
- Born: September 25, 1970 (age 56); Phoenix, Arizona, U.S.
- Listed height: 6 ft 0 in (1.83 m)
- Listed weight: 186 lb (84 kg)

Career information
- High school: St. Mary's (Phoenix)
- College: Phoenix JC (1989); San Diego State (1990–1992)

Career history
- New York Jets (1993); San Francisco 49ers (1995)*; Carolina Panthers (1995–1997)
- * Offseason or practice squad member only
- Stats at Pro Football Reference

Mark Damon Pieri (born September 25, 1970) is an American former professional football safety who played three seasons in the National Football League (NFL) with the New York Jets and Carolina Panthers. He played college football at Phoenix College and San Diego State University.

== Early life and college ==
Mark Damon Pieri was born on September 25, 1970, in Phoenix, Arizona. He played high school football at St. Mary's High School in Phoenix as a defensive back and running back, earning all-state honors.

Pieri played college football at Phoenix College in 1989 and garnered all-conference recognition. He was then a three-year letterman for the San Diego State Aztecs of San Diego State University from 1990 to 1992 and earned all-Western Athletic Conference honors. He recorded three interceptions in 1991 and two interceptions in 1992.

== Professional career ==
After going undrafted in the 1993 NFL draft, Pieri signed with the New York Jets on April 27. He was released on August 30 but re-signed the next day. He was the only undrafted player on the Jets' opening day roster that year. He played in five games for the Jets during the 1993 season, posting two tackles. Pieri was released on October 13 and signed to the practice squad on October 22, 1993. He re-signed with the Jets on April 26, 1994. He broke his ankle in the Jets' first preseason game of the 1994 season and was waived with an injury settlement in late August 1994.

Pieri was signed by the San Francisco 49ers on April 14, 1995. He was released on August 21, 1995.

Pieri signed with the Carolina Panthers on August 30, 1995. He was later released on November 15, 1995, without appearing in any games. He signed with the Panthers again on March 20, 1996. Pieri played in all 16 games, starting one, for the team during the 1996 season, recording nine solo tackles and one interception. He also appeared in two playoff games that year. He played in all 16 games for the second straight season in 1997. Pieri became a free agent after the 1997 season and re-signed with the Panthers on February 13, 1998. He retired on July 23, 1998.

== Personal life ==
After his NFL career, Pieri became a teacher and football coach at Sunnyslope High School in Phoenix, including a ten-year stint as head coach. He has also spent time coaching tennis at Sunnyslope.
