= Rod Smith (defensive back) =

American football player (born 1970)

No. 22, 21, 31
- Position: Cornerback

Personal information
- Born: March 12, 1970 (age 56); Saint Paul, Minnesota, U.S.
- Listed height: 5 ft 11 in (1.80 m)
- Listed weight: 187 lb (85 kg)

Career information
- High school: Roseville Area
- College: Notre Dame
- NFL draft: 1992: 2nd round, 35th overall pick
- Expansion draft: 1995: 1st round, 2nd overall pick

Career history
- New England Patriots (1992–1994); Carolina Panthers (1995); Minnesota Vikings (1996); Carolina Panthers (1996–1998); Green Bay Packers (1998)

Career NFL statistics
- Tackles: 251
- Interceptions: 5
- Sacks: 1.5
- Stats at Pro Football Reference

Rodney Marc Smith (born March 12, 1970) is an American former professional football player who was a cornerback in the National Football League (NFL) for the New England Patriots, Carolina Panthers, and Green Bay Packers. He played college football for the Notre Dame Fighting Irish. In high school, he played running back for Roseville Area High School.

== Professional career ==
Pre-draft measurables
Height	Weight	Arm length	Hand span	40-yard dash	10-yard split	20-yard split	20-yard shuttle	Vertical jump	Broad jump	Bench press
5 ft 11 in (1.80 m)	187 lb (85 kg)	30 1/2 in (0.77 m)	8 7/8 in (0.23 m)	4.52 s	1.58 s	2.63 s	4.01 s	36.0 in (0.91 m)	10 ft 1 in (3.07 m)	11 reps
All values from NFL Combine

Smith was selected 35th overall in the second round of the 1992 NFL draft by the New England Patriots. He was the second selection in the 1995 NFL expansion draft, and first selection for the Panthers in that draft.
