= Frank Garcia (offensive lineman) =

American football player (born 1972)

No. 63, 65
- Position: Center

Personal information
- Born: January 28, 1972 (age 54); Phoenix, Arizona, U.S.
- Listed height: 6 ft 2 in (1.88 m)
- Listed weight: 302 lb (137 kg)

Career information
- High school: Phoenix (AZ) Maryvale
- College: Washington
- NFL draft: 1995: 4th round, 132nd overall pick

Career history
- Carolina Panthers (1995–2000); St. Louis Rams (2001–2002); Arizona Cardinals (2003)

Awards and highlights
- National champion (1991); First-team All-Pac-10 (1994)

Career NFL statistics
- Games played: 125
- Games started: 92
- Fumble recoveries: 9
- Stats at Pro Football Reference

Frank Christopher Garcia (born January 28, 1972) is an American former professional football player in the National Football League (NFL). He was selected by the Carolina Panthers in the 1995 NFL draft. He also played for the St. Louis Rams and Arizona Cardinals.

Garcia was suspended from the NFL for the first 4 games of the 2003 season after testing positive for the banned substance ephedra, and has not played since that season. He played college football at the University of Washington, including the Huskies 1994 upset of the University of Miami.

Garcia had his own radio show in Charlotte, North Carolina and coaches football at Charlotte Catholic High School.
