= Michael Bates (American football) =

American athlete (born 1969)

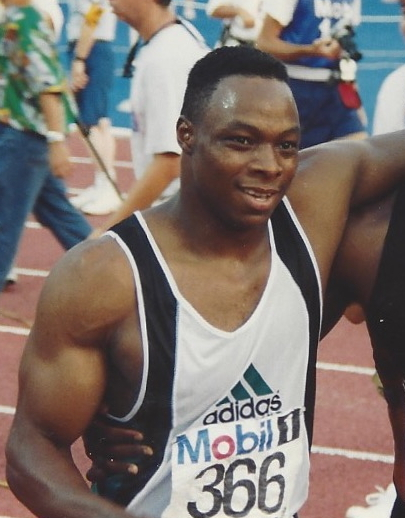

No. 81, 83, 82, 24, 20, 29
- Positions: Return specialist, wide receiver

Personal information
- Born: December 19, 1969 (age 56); Victoria, Texas, U.S.
- Listed height: 5 ft 10 in (1.78 m)
- Listed weight: 189 lb (86 kg)

Career information
- High school: Tucson (AZ) Amphitheater
- College: Arizona
- NFL draft: 1992: 6th round, 150th overall pick

Career history
- Seattle Seahawks (1993–1994); Carolina Panthers (1995)*; Cleveland Browns (1995); Carolina Panthers (1996–2000); Washington Redskins (2001); Carolina Panthers (2002); New York Jets (2003); Dallas Cowboys (2003)
- * Offseason or practice squad member only

Awards and highlights
- 3× First-team All-Pro (1996, 1999, 2000); 5× Pro Bowl (1996–2000); NFL 1990s All-Decade Team

Career NFL statistics
- Kick Returns: 373
- Kick return yards: 9,110
- Return touchdowns: 5
- Stats at Pro Football Reference

Medal record

Men's athletics

Representing the United States

Olympic Games
Bronze medal – third place	1992 Barcelona	200 metres

Summer Universiade
Gold medal – first place	1991 Sheffield	100 metres

Michael Dion Bates (born December 19, 1969) is an American former two-sport athlete who gained fame as a sprinter who won an Olympic bronze medal in the 200-meter dash in 1992. He also played football as a kick returner in the National Football League (NFL), where he was a five-time Pro Bowl selection. He played college football for the Arizona Wildcats.

== Early life ==
Bates attended Amphitheater High School, where he lettered in football and track. He played as a running back, recording more than 1,000 rushing yards in each of his last three seasons. As a senior, although he played in only 8 games because of an injury, he still managed to run for 1,557 yards.

He set state records in the 100 metres (10.34 seconds) and 200 metres (20.68 seconds). He bypassed his senior season in track, while disputing some scheduling rules by the Arizona Interscholastic Association.

As a senior, he received Parade magazine All-American, The Arizona Republic's male Athlete of the Year and Long Beach Press-Telegram "Best in the West" honors. He was rated by Parade as the second-best prospect in the country at running back behind Terry Kirby.

In 2014, he was inducted into the Pima County Sports Hall of Fame.

== College career ==
Bates accepted a football scholarship from the University of Arizona. He played as a running back and wide receiver with the Wildcats, but was mainly used as a kickoff returner, averaging 23.7 yards on 45 kickoff returns during his college career.

As a true freshman in 1989, he had 14 returns for a 24.1-yard average. As a sophomore in 1990, he ranked among the All-purpose leaders in the Pac-10 and received honorable-mention honors. His 97-yard kickoff return for a touchdown against Washington State University was the fourth-longest in school history. He collected 31 kickoff returns for a 23.5-yard average.

In track, he was voted the Pac-10's Outstanding Male Performer at the conference track championships in 1989 and 1990, winning the 100 and 200 metres. He was also a member of the Wildcats 400-meter relay team that finished second in the 1989 NCAA Championships. His college-best time was 10.17 in the 100 metres.

In 1991, he did not enroll at the school so he could concentrate on his track career. He declared for the NFL draft in 1992.

In 2013, he was inducted into the University of Arizona Sports Hall of Fame.

== Olympics ==
At the June 1992 US Olympic Trials he finished third, qualifying for the Olympics, edging Carl Lewis by one one-hundredth of a second for the final qualifying spot.

In the 1992 Barcelona Olympics, his time of 20.38 from the inside lane, put him 0.37 seconds behind gold medal winner Michael Marsh and 0.25 seconds behind silver medalist Frankie Fredericks to win the bronze medal. He set his personal best time in the 200 metres – 20.01 seconds – at the Weltklasse meet in Zürich 13 days after the Olympics.

=== Personal bests ===
Event	Time (seconds)	Venue	Date
50 meters	5.75	Los Angeles, California	February 15, 1992
100 meters	10.17	Sheffield, England	July 21, 1991
200 meters	20.01	Zürich, Switzerland	August 19, 1992

== Professional career ==
Pre-draft measurables
Height	Weight	Arm length	Hand span	40-yard dash	10-yard split	20-yard split	Vertical jump
5 ft 9 3/4 in (1.77 m)	187 lb (85 kg)	31 7/8 in (0.81 m)	9 in (0.23 m)	4.48 s	1.61 s	2.62 s	34.5 in (0.88 m)

Bates was selected by the Seattle Seahawks in the sixth round (150th overall) of the 1992 NFL draft. Because of contract negotiations, he did not sign with Seattle and held out during the 1992 season, although the time away from playing helped him to reshape his body for football.

On March 7, 1993, he signed an incentive laden contract including a $15k workout bonus, $10k playoff percentage time bonus and over $50k in performance bonus. He was a backup wide receiver, setting a franchise team record with 22 special teams tackles and was a Pro Bowl alternate to Steve Tasker. In 1995, Bates was an exclusive rights free agent where Seattle ended up agreeing to terms with him on a 1-year $700k deal in July. After new head coach Dennis Erickson traded for Ricky Proehl and drafted Joey Galloway, Bates became expendable and was waived August 27.

On August 28, 1995, the Carolina Panthers claimed Bates off waivers only to turn around and trade him the next day to the Cleveland Browns in exchange for linebacker Travis Hill. Bates spent the last 3 games of the season on the inactive list and was not retained. On March 11, 1996, he signed as a free agent with the Panthers and began his great run of seasons with the franchise, returning 33 kicks for 998 yards, with a remarkable average of 30.2 yards per return - and one kick returned for a touchdown.

After five seasons in Carolina, Bates was let go, and the Washington Redskins signed him to a 2-year, $1.33 million contract. At the end of the season he was named a Pro Bowl alternate. He was released on March 12, 2002. On March 25, he was signed by the Carolina Panthers. His season was cut short that year, however, due to a broken right ankle he suffered in preseason against the Dallas Cowboys and was placed on the injured reserve list on August 26.

On March 31, 2003, he re-signed with Carolina but was let go in the final cut-down process for the regular season on August 31. On September 10, Bates was signed by the New York Jets, but a right-hand injury placed him on the injured reserve list on November 11, and he was later released on December 23. On December 26, he was claimed off waivers by the Dallas Cowboys for their playoff run. He was not re-signed after the season.

Bates finished with 9,154 total yards in kick returns and five kick-return touchdowns (the NFL record for kickoff return touchdowns in a career is six). He was selected to the NFL 1990s All-Decade Team.

=== Panthers franchise records ===
As of 2017's NFL off-season, Michael Bates held at least 12 Panthers franchise records, including:

- Kick Returns: career (233), season (59 in 1998), game (9 on 1998-10-04 @ATL), playoff game (5 on 1997-01-05 DAL; with Rod Smart and Mark Jones)
- Kick Return Yds: career (5,987), season (1,480 in 1998), playoff game (155 on 1997-01-05 DAL)
- Yds per kick return: career (25.7), season (30.24 in 1996), playoff game (31 on 1997-01-05 DAL )
- Kick Return TDs: career (5), season (2 in 1999; with Steve Smith Sr.)

=== Pro Bowl records ===
- Most career kick returns (17)
- Most career kick return yards (488)

== Personal life ==
His brother Mario played for the Arizona Cardinals and was a second-round draft choice of the New Orleans Saints in 1992 from Arizona State. Another brother, Marion, played college football at Southern California and Arizona.

During his pro day, fellow Arizona quarterback Shane Nagore threw passes to Bates, sprinter James Bullock and running back Napoleon Kaufman in front of scouts from the NFL.
