= Dom Capers =

American football player and coach (born 1950)

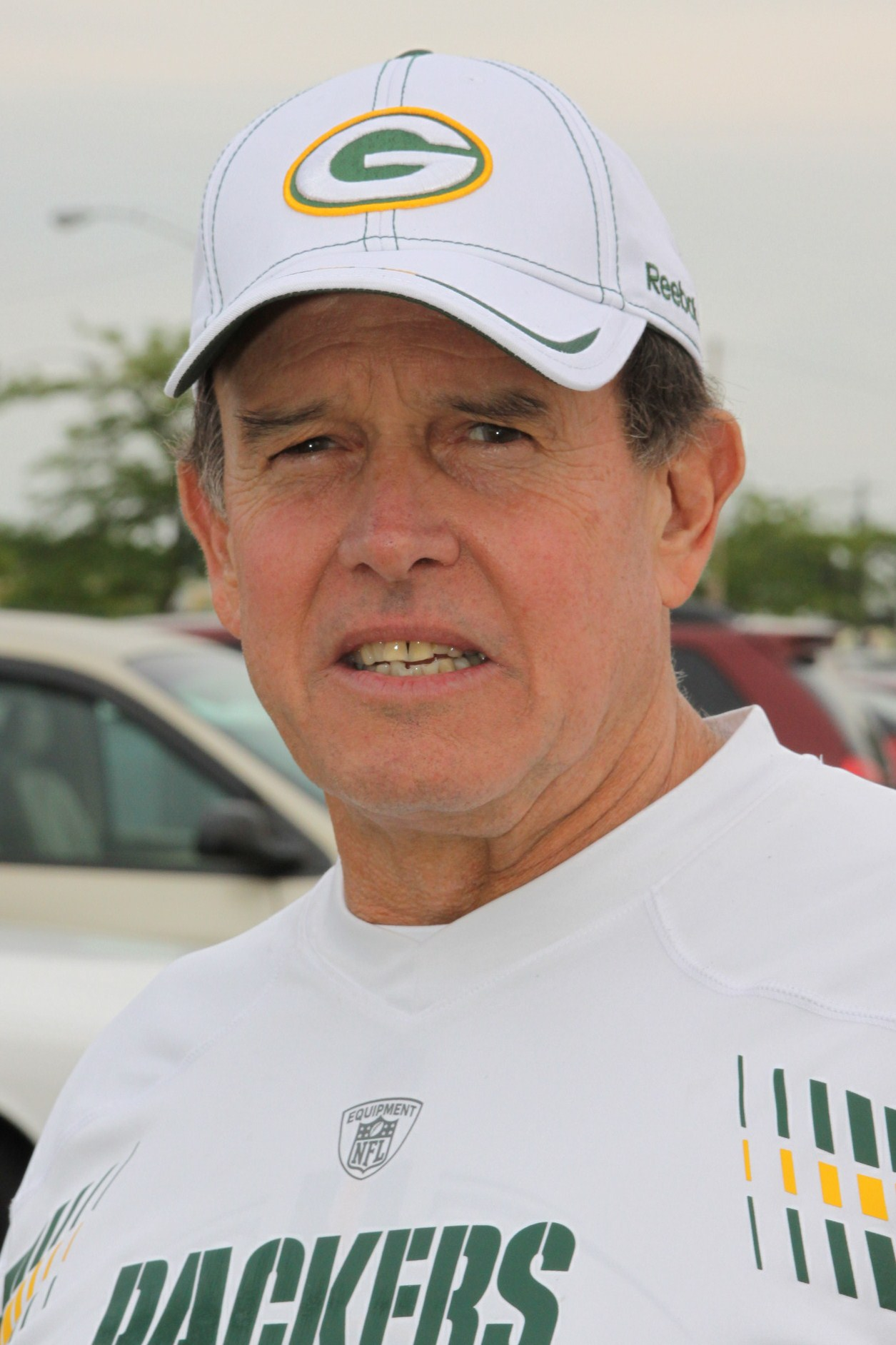
- Capers with the Green Bay Packers in 2011

Cleveland Browns
- Title: Senior defensive assistant

Personal information
- Born: August 7, 1950 (age 76); Cambridge, Ohio, U.S.

Career information
- Position: Linebacker
- High school: Meadowbrook (Byesville, Ohio)
- College: Mount Union

Career history
- Kent State (1972–1974) Graduate assistant; Washington (1975) Graduate assistant; Hawaii (1975–1976) Defensive backs coach; San Jose State (1977) Defensive backs coach; California (1978–1979) Defensive backs coach; Tennessee (1980–1981) Defensive backs coach; Ohio State (1982–1983) Defensive backs coach; Philadelphia/Baltimore Stars (1984–1985) Defensive backs coach; New Orleans Saints (1986–1991) Defensive backs coach; Pittsburgh Steelers (1992–1994) Defensive coordinator; Carolina Panthers (1995–1998) Head coach; Jacksonville Jaguars (1999–2000) Defensive coordinator; Houston Texans (2002–2005) Head coach; Miami Dolphins (2006–2007) Defensive coordinator; New England Patriots (2008) Special assistant & secondary coach; Green Bay Packers (2009–2017) Defensive coordinator; Jacksonville Jaguars (2019) Senior defensive assistant; Minnesota Vikings (2020) Senior defensive assistant; Detroit Lions (2021) Senior defensive assistant; Denver Broncos (2022) Senior defensive assistant; Carolina Panthers (2023–2025) Senior defensive assistant; Cleveland Browns (2026–present) Senior defensive assistant

Awards and highlights
- As head coach: AP NFL Coach of the Year (1996); The Sporting News NFL Coach of the Year (1996); Pro Football Weekly NFL Coach of the Year (1996); Greasy Neale Award (1996); UPI NFC Coach of the Year (1996); As assistant coach: Super Bowl champion (XLV)

Head coaching record
- Regular season: 48–80 (.375)
- Postseason: 1–1 (.500)
- Career: 49–81 (.377)
- Coaching profile at Pro Football Reference
- Executive profile at Pro Football Reference

Ernest Dominic Capers (born August 7, 1950) is an American football coach who is a senior defensive assistant for the Cleveland Browns of the National Football League (NFL). He was previously the inaugural head coach of the Carolina Panthers and the Houston Texans for four seasons each. Capers is the only head coach to lead two different NFL expansion teams during their first seasons.

A defensive assistant for most of his coaching career, Capers held his first defensive coordinator position with the Pittsburgh Steelers in 1992. He left Pittsburgh to become the Panthers head coach in 1995, guiding the team to a 7–9 record, the best finish for an NFL expansion franchise's inaugural season. The next year, Capers led the Panthers to a division title and the NFC Championship Game, making them the youngest NFL expansion franchise to accomplish both. Following two consecutive losing records, he was fired after the 1998 season.

Capers' early success with Carolina would result in him serving as the inaugural head coach of the Texans from 2002 to 2005, although he was unable to lead them to a winning record or playoff berth. He continued to hold assistant coaching positions afterwards, most prominently as the defensive coordinator of the Green Bay Packers from 2009 to 2017, helping them win Super Bowl XLV.

== Early life ==
After playing high school football for the Meadowbrook Colts in Byesville, Ohio, Capers attended Mount Union College in Alliance, Ohio where he played linebacker and defensive tackle. He is a brother of the Alpha Nu chapter of Alpha Tau Omega fraternity.

== Coaching career ==
=== College ===
He began his coaching career as a graduate assistant at Kent State University and the University of Washington. Later he was an assistant coach at Hawaii, San Jose State, University of California, Berkeley, Tennessee, and Ohio State.

=== Professional ===
After a stint in the USFL, he began his NFL career as an assistant with the New Orleans Saints and was named defensive coordinator of the Pittsburgh Steelers in 1992, including a trip to the AFC Championship game in 1994. He remained with the Steelers until becoming head coach of the expansion Carolina Panthers in 1995. After 1995's 7–9 season, a record breaking mark for an expansion team, the Panthers posted a 12–4 record in 1996 and advanced to the NFC Championship game, where they were defeated by the eventual Super Bowl XXXI champion Green Bay Packers. This would end up being Capers' only winning season as a head coach, as well as the only season in which his team qualified for the playoffs. Continuing to spend against the salary cap, and eventually taking control of personnel matters in 1997, the Panthers went 7–9, followed by a 4–12 season in 1998, at the end of which he was terminated.

After being let go from the Panthers, he served as the defensive coordinator with the Jacksonville Jaguars until becoming the head coach of the expansion Houston Texans on January 21, 2001. After starting out 4–12 (2002) and 5–11 (2003) in his first two seasons in Houston, the Texans posted a 7–9 mark in 2004. However, the Texans dropped to a record of 2–14 in 2005 and Capers was fired.

On January 23, 2006, the Miami Dolphins announced the hiring of Dom Capers as the team's defensive coordinator. There, he served as assistant head coach. With an annual salary of $2.6 million, Capers was the highest paid assistant coach in the NFL, alongside Washington Redskins assistant head coach Gregg Williams. On Thursday, January 3, 2008, Dom Capers was fired along with all offensive and defensive coaches.

On January 29, 2008, Capers interviewed with the Dallas Cowboys for the vacant linebackers coach position. It is rumored that he was offered the defensive coordinator or defensive consultant position.

On February 21, 2008, Capers was hired by the Patriots as their secondary coach/special assistant, replacing Joel Collier.

On January 19, 2009, Capers was named the Green Bay Packers defensive coordinator by head coach Mike McCarthy and general manager Ted Thompson, where he replaced the 4–3 defense Green Bay had used since 1992 with the 3–4 he used in Miami. Green Bay's defensive ranking in his first year improved to second in the league in 2009, from 21st in the league in 2008.

Between September 12, 2010, and January 2011, Capers' defense finished the regular season ranked 2nd in scoring defense, 5th in total defense, 2nd in interceptions, 2nd in sacks, and 1st in opposing quarterback passer rating, in spite of being decimated by injuries during the 2010 season. On February 6, 2011, Capers led a 5th ranked defensive squad and helped the Packers win the Super Bowl. During the playoff run his team had a pick six in the final 3 playoff games that year; Divisional Round (Tramon Williams), Championship game (B. J. Raji), and in Super Bowl XLV (Nick Collins).

On January 1, 2018, he was fired as the defensive coordinator of the Green Bay Packers by head coach Mike McCarthy.

On February 19, 2019, the Jacksonville Jaguars announced that Capers will join their coaching staff as a senior defensive assistant. After one season in Jacksonville, he joined the Minnesota Vikings on February 10, 2020, in the same capacity. His contract with the Vikings was not renewed after the season.

On January 29, 2021, the Detroit Lions announced that Capers will join their coaching staff as a senior defensive assistant.

On February 11, 2022, Capers was hired by the Denver Broncos to serve as a senior defensive assistant for the 2022 season. Following a year-long stint with the Broncos, Capers returned to the Carolina Panthers to serve as a senior defensive assistant under newly hired head coach Frank Reich.

On February 24, 2026, the Cleveland Browns hired Capers to serve as a senior defensive assistant.

== Head coaching record ==
Team	Year	Regular season					Postseason			
Team	Year	Won	Lost	Ties	Win %	Finish	Won	Lost	Win %	Result
CAR	1995	7	9	0	.438	4th in NFC West	-	-	-	-
CAR	1996	12	4	0	.750	1st in NFC West	1	1	.500	Lost to Green Bay Packers in NFC Championship Game
CAR	1997	7	9	0	.438	2nd in NFC West	-	-	-	-
CAR	1998	4	12	0	.250	4th in NFC West	-	-	-	-
CAR total		30	34	0	.468		1	1	.500	
HOU	2002	4	12	0	.250	4th in AFC South	-	-	-	-
HOU	2003	5	11	0	.312	4th in AFC South	-	-	-	-
HOU	2004	7	9	0	.437	3rd in AFC South	-	-	-	-
HOU	2005	2	14	0	.125	4th in AFC South	-	-	-	-
HOU total		18	46	0	.281		-	-	-	
Total		48	80	0	.375		1	1	.500	
