= 2003 Carolina Panthers season =

NFL team season

- Owner: Jerry Richardson
- General manager: Marty Hurney
- Head coach: John Fox
- Home stadium: Ericsson Stadium

Results
- Record: 11–5
- Division place: 1st NFC South
- Playoffs: Won Wild Card Playoffs (vs. Cowboys) 29–10; Won Divisional Playoffs (at Rams) 29–23 (2OT); Won NFC Championship (at Eagles) 14–3; Lost Super Bowl XXXVIII (vs. Patriots) 29–32
- All-Pros: DT Kris Jenkins (1st team)
- Pro Bowlers: RB Stephen Davis; DT Kris Jenkins; DE Mike Rucker; P Todd Sauerbrun

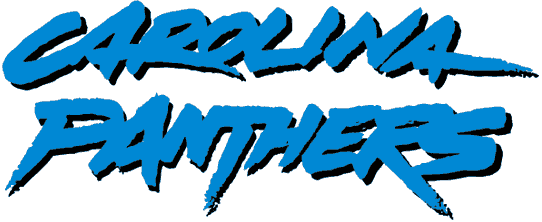
Carolina Panthers wordmark between 1996 and 2011

The 2003 Carolina Panthers season was the franchise's 9th season in the National Football League (NFL) and the second season under head coach John Fox. They improved on their 7–9 record from 2002, and made it to the playoffs for the first time since 1996 and only the second time in franchise history.

The season would be a huge success. Just two years after going 1–15, the Panthers would go a surprising 11–5 to earn the #3 seed in the NFC Playoffs. They would defeat the Dallas Cowboys 29–10 in the Wild Card playoffs. The next week in St. Louis, the game would go to double overtime and on the first play of the second overtime, Steve Smith caught a pass by Jake Delhomme and took it 69 yards into the endzone to put an end to the game.

In the Conference Championship game, the Panthers traveled to Lincoln Financial Field in Philadelphia to play the Eagles who were in their 3rd straight conference championship game, but had yet to win one. The Panthers would continue the story with a 14–3 victory, which was dominated by Ricky Manning’s three interceptions that kept the Eagles at bay. With winning the NFC as the #3 seed, the Panthers were the first NFC champion seeded neither first nor second since the playoff field expanded in 1990.

The Panthers advanced to the Super Bowl for the first time in franchise history, but lost 32–29 to the New England Patriots on a last-second field goal by kicker Adam Vinatieri.

== Offseason ==
Additions	Subtractions
QB Jake Delhomme (Saints)	TE Wesley Walls (Packers)
WR Ricky Proehl (Rams)	DT Sean Gilbert (Raiders)
WR Kevin Dyson (Titans)	LB Hannibal Navies (Packers)
RB Stephen Davis (Redskins)	RB Lamar Smith (Packers)
G Doug Brzezinski (Eagles)	

=== NFL draft ===
2003 Carolina Panthers draft
Round	Pick	Player	Position	College	Notes
1	8	Jordan Gross *	Offensive tackle	Utah	
2	50	Bruce Nelson	Guard	Iowa	
3	76	Mike Seidman	Tight end	UCLA	
3	82	Ricky Manning	Cornerback	UCLA	
4	119	Colin Branch	Safety	Stanford	
5	145	Kindal Moorehead	Defensive tackle	Alabama	
7	226	Walter Young	Wide receiver	Illinois	
7	247	Casey Moore	Fullback	Stanford	
Made roster * Made at least one Pro Bowl during career

=== Undrafted free agents ===
2003 undrafted free agents of note
Player	Position	College
Tony Brown	Defensive end	Memphis
Zach Butler	Center	Iowa State
Trohn Garswell	Tackle	Rutgers
Vinny Ciurciu	Linebacker	Boston College
Lawrence Flugence	Linebacker	Texas Tech

== Personnel ==
2003 Carolina Panthers staff
Front office: Owner/founder – Jerry Richardson; President – Mark Richardson; General manager – Marty Hurney; Head coaches: Head coach – John Fox; Offensive coaches: Offensive coordinator – Dan Henning; Running backs – Jim Skipper; Wide receivers – Richard Williamson; Tight ends – Dave Magazu; Offensive line – Mike Maser; Offensive assistant/quarterbacks – Mike McCoy	Defensive coaches: Defensive coordinator – Mike Trgovac; Defensive line – Sal Sunseri; Linebackers – Ken Flajole; Linebackers – Sam Mills; Secondary – Rod Perry; Defensive assistant – Martin Bayless; Special teams coaches: Assistant head coach/special teams – Scott O'Brien; Special teams assistant – Danny Crossman; Strength and conditioning: Strength and conditioning – Jerry Simmons

== Roster ==
2003 Carolina Panthers roster
Quarterbacks (QB): 17 Jake Delhomme; 9 Rodney Peete; 16 Chris Weinke; Running backs (RB): 48 Stephen Davis; 20 DeShaun Foster; 37 Nick Goings; 45 Brad Hoover FB; 32 Rod Smart KR; Wide receivers (WR): 80 Eugene Baker; 85 Kevin Dyson; 88 Karl Hankton; 87 Muhsin Muhammad; 81 Ricky Proehl; 89 Steve Smith; Tight ends (TE): 47 Marco Battaglia; 86 Kris Mangum; 84 Jermaine Wiggins	Offensive linemen (OL): 79 Doug Brzezinski G; 65 Kevin Donnalley G; 69 Jordan Gross T; 78 Jeno James G; 60 Jeff Mitchell C; 70 Bruce Nelson C/G; 76 Tutan Reyes G/T; 75 Todd Steussie T; 71 Matt Willig T; Defensive linemen (DL): 99 Brentson Buckner DT; 98 Shane Burton DT; 77 Kris Jenkins DT; 94 Kindal Moorehead DT; 90 Julius Peppers DE; 97 Kemp Rasmussen DE; 93 Mike Rucker DE; 96 Al Wallace DE	Linebackers (LB): 52 Brian Allen OLB; 50 Vinny Ciurciu MLB; 53 Greg Favors OLB; 55 Dan Morgan MLB; 57 Lester Towns MLB; 54 Will Witherspoon; Defensive backs (DB): 28 Colin Branch FS; 40 Jarrod Cooper CB/S; 21 Terry Cousin CB; 27 Deon Grant FS; 31 William Hampton CB; 23 Reggie Howard CB; 24 Ricky Manning CB; 30 Mike Minter SS; 42 Travares Tillman SS; 29 Dante Wesley CB; Special teams (ST): 4 John Kasay K; 56 Jason Kyle LS; 10 Todd Sauerbrun P	Practice squad: 95 Chris Demaree DT; 49 Deitan Dubuc TE; 68 Mike Houghton G/T; 91 Omari Jordan DT; 66 Louis Williams C; Reserve: 46 Rashard Anderson CB (Susp.); 59 Mike Caldwell LB (IR); 58 Mark Fields LB (NF-Ill.); 33 Casey Moore FB (IR); 92 Kavika Pittman DE (IR); 39 Damien Richardson S (IR); 82 Mike Seidman TE (IR); 73 Melvin Tuten T (IR); 83 Walter Young WR (IR); Rookies in italics 53 active, 9 reserve, 5 practice squad

== Preseason ==
Week	Date	Opponent	Result	Record	Venue	Recap
1	August 9	Washington Redskins	W 20–0	1–0	Ericsson Stadium	Recap
2	August 15	at New York Giants	W 20–10	2–0	Giants Stadium	Recap
3	August 23	at Green Bay Packers	W 20–7	3–0	Lambeau Field	Recap
3	August 29	Pittsburgh Steelers	W 21–14	4–0	Ericsson Stadium	Recap

== Regular season ==
=== Schedule ===
Week	Date	Opponent	Result	Record	Venue	Recap
1	September 7	Jacksonville Jaguars	W 24–23	1–0	Ericsson Stadium	Recap
2	September 14	at Tampa Bay Buccaneers	W 12–9 (OT)	2–0	Raymond James Stadium	Recap
3	Bye					
4	September 28	Atlanta Falcons	W 23–3	3–0	Ericsson Stadium	Recap
5	October 5	New Orleans Saints	W 19–13	4–0	Ericsson Stadium	Recap
6	October 12	at Indianapolis Colts	W 23–20 (OT)	5–0	RCA Dome	Recap
7	October 19	Tennessee Titans	L 17–37	5–1	Ericsson Stadium	Recap
8	October 26	at New Orleans Saints	W 23–20 (OT)	6–1	Louisiana Superdome	Recap
9	November 2	at Houston Texans	L 10–14	6–2	Reliant Stadium	Recap
10	November 9	Tampa Bay Buccaneers	W 27–24	7–2	Ericsson Stadium	Recap
11	November 16	Washington Redskins	W 20–17	8–2	Ericsson Stadium	Recap
12	November 23	at Dallas Cowboys	L 20–24	8–3	Texas Stadium	Recap
13	November 30	Philadelphia Eagles	L 16–25	8–4	Ericsson Stadium	Recap
14	December 7	at Atlanta Falcons	L 14–20 (OT)	8–5	Georgia Dome	Recap
15	December 14	at Arizona Cardinals	W 20–17	9–5	Sun Devil Stadium	Recap
16	December 21	Detroit Lions	W 20–14	10–5	Ericsson Stadium	Recap
17	December 28	at New York Giants	W 37–24	11–5	Giants Stadium	Recap

== Standings ==
NFC South
	W	L	T	PCT	DIV	CONF	PF	PA	STK
^{(3)} Carolina Panthers	11	5	0	.688	5–1	9–3	325	304	W3
New Orleans Saints	8	8	0	.500	3–3	7–5	340	326	W1
Tampa Bay Buccaneers	7	9	0	.438	2–4	6–6	301	264	L2
Atlanta Falcons	5	11	0	.313	2–4	4–8	299	422	W2

== Postseason ==
Week	Date	Opponent	Result	Record	Venue	Recap
Wild Card	January 3, 2004	Dallas Cowboys	W 29–10	1–0	Ericsson Stadium	Recap
Divisional	January 10, 2004	at St. Louis Rams	W 29–23 (2OT)	2–0	Edward Jones Dome	Recap
Conference	January 18, 2004	at Philadelphia Eagles	W 14–3	3–0	Lincoln Financial Field	Recap
Super Bowl XXXVIII	February 1, 2004	at New England Patriots	L 29–32	3–1	Reliant Stadium	Recap

=== NFC Wild Card playoff ===
Carolina Panthers 29, Dallas Cowboys 10

Quarter	1	2	3	4	Total
Cowboys	0	3	0	7	10
Panthers	6	10	7	6	29

at Ericsson Stadium, Charlotte, North Carolina

- Date: Saturday, January 3, 2004
- Game time: 8:00 p.m. EST
- Game weather: 63 °F (17.2 °C), partly cloudy
- Game attendance: 73,014
- Referee: Walt Coleman
- TV announcers (ABC): Al Michaels (play-by-play), John Madden (color commentator), and Lisa Guerrero (sideline reporter)

The Cowboys' turnaround season under coach Bill Parcells came to a crashing halt. The Panthers outgained the Cowboys in total yards 380–204 and held the ball for 34:23. Dallas Quarterback Quincy Carter threw for only 154 yards and an interception, while being sacked 3 times. Meanwhile, Panthers quarterback Jake Delhomme threw for 273 yards and a touchdown to Steve Smith, who had five receptions for 135 yards and added 22 return yards on special teams. Stephen Davis ran for 104 yards and another touchdown, while Muhsin Muhammad caught four passes for 103 yards. John Kasay kicked five field goals for Carolina.

On the Panther third play of the game, Delhomme completed a 70-yard pass to Smith on the Cowboys 1-yard line, setting up Kasay's first field goal. Later in the first quarter, Toby Gowin's 31-yard punt gave the Panthers the ball at the Cowboys 41-yard line, and they scored another field goal to take a 6–0 lead. On the Cowboys ensuing drive, Carter completed a 28-yard pass to Joey Galloway and Troy Hambrick ran for 16 yards, giving Dallas a first down at the Panthers 20-yard line. But two plays later, fullback Richie Anderson fumbled the ball and Carolina safety Mike Minter recovered it.

Later in the second quarter, Gowin once again gave the Panthers great field position with a 17-yard punt to the Carolina 49-yard line, and this time they managed to get the ball into the end zone with a 23-yard touchdown run by Davis, giving them a 13–0 lead. Carter managed to respond on the Cowboys ensuing drive, completing an 18-yard pass to Galloway, a 21-yard pass to Terry Glenn, and a 12-yard pass to Anderson. Billy Cundiff finished the drive with a 37-yard field goal to cut the score to 13–3 with 1:03 left in the second quarter. But after the ensuing kickoff, Delhomme's 57-yard completion to Muhammad set up Kasay's third field goal on the last play of the half.

The Panthers continued to dominate the game in the second half. Smith returned a Gowin punt 7 yards to the Panthers 37-yard line. Then after a 24-yard reception by Muhammad, he caught a 7-yard pass and capped the drive with a 32-yard touchdown catch. Later on, he returned a punt to his own 40-yard line, setting up a 38-yard drive that ended with Kasay's fourth field goal, increasing the Panthers lead to 26–3.

Dallas receiver Michael Bates returned the ensuing kickoff 41 yards to the Panthers 47-yard line, sparking a desperate rally. Carter then completed six consecutive passes and finished the drive with a 9-yard touchdown run, cutting the score to 26–10. Dallas' defense managed to force a punt on Carolina's next drive, but two plays later, Panthers lineman Julius Peppers intercepted a screen pass from Carter and returned it 34 yards to the Cowboys 11-yard. Four plays later, Kasay kicked his 5th field goal with 3:04 left in the game to close out the scoring.

- Scoring
  - CAR – field goal Kasay 18 CAR 3–0
  - CAR – field goal Kasay 38 CAR 6–0
  - CAR – Davis 23 run (Kasay kick) CAR 13–0
  - DAL – field goal Cundiff 37 CAR 13–3
  - CAR – field goal Kasay 19 CAR 16–3
  - CAR – Smith 32 pass from Delhomme (Kasay kick) CAR 23–3
  - CAR – field goal Kasay 32 CAR 26–3
  - DAL – Carter 9 run (Cundif kick) CAR 26–10
  - CAR – field goal Kasay 34 CAR 29–10

=== NFC Divisional playoff ===
Carolina Panthers 29, St. Louis Rams 23 (2OT)

Quarter	1	2	3	4	OT	2OT	Total
Panthers	0	10	6	7	0	6	29
Rams	3	6	3	11	0	0	23

at Edward Jones Dome, St. Louis, Missouri

- Date: Saturday, January 10, 2004
- Game time: 4:30 p.m. EST/3:30 p.m. CST
- Game weather: Played indoors, domed stadium
- Game attendance: 66,165
- Referee: Mike Carey
- TV announcers (Fox): Dick Stockton (play-by-play), Daryl Johnston (color commentator), Tony Siragusa (sideline reporter)

In their first trip to St. Louis since their disastrous final season in the NFC West, the Panthers stunned the favored Rams in double-overtime, the fifth longest game in NFL history, in a thrilling finish to a game that featured big swings in momentum. St. Louis built up a 6–0 lead early in the second quarter, but wide receiver Muhsin Muhammad's touchdown on a fumble recovery gave Carolina a 7–6 advantage. Kickers John Kasay and Jeff Wilkins spent the rest of the second and the third quarter trading field goals. But in the fourth quarter, Brad Hoover's 7-yard rushing touchdown gave the Panthers a 23–12 lead.

However, St. Louis rallied back. After Kasay missed a 54-yard field goal attempt with 6:26 left in regulation, the Rams drove 57 yards in 15 plays and scored with Marshall Faulk's 1-yard touchdown run. Marc Bulger's subsequent 2-point conversion pass to Dane Looker cut the score to 23–20 with 2:39 to go. Then Wilkins recovered his own onside kick, setting up a 43-yard drive that ended with his 33-yard field goal. The field goal would cause some controversy, as the Rams held the ball inside the Carolina 20-yard line with less than a minute remaining, and one time out. But Rams coach Mike Martz elected to play for the tie, allowing the clock to run down and kicked the tying field goal, rather than let his quick-scoring offense try for the winning touchdown. Wilkins' 5th field goal of the game as time expired in the 4th Quarter tied the score at 23 and sent it into overtime.

Both teams missed field goals in the first overtime period. The Panthers would march down to the Rams 22-yard line on their first drive in Overtime, and Carolina kicker John Kasay in fact made a 40-yard field goal that would have won the game. But the Panthers were flagged for a delay of game, and Kasay's attempt from 45 yards was wide right. On the Rams ensuing possession, Wilkins would attempt a 53-yard field goal, but it fell short.

The Rams held the ball late in the first overtime, and were driving into Carolina territory, however an initial completion from Bulger to Torry Holt was intercepted by Carolina cornerback Ricky Manning, Jr when he wrenched the ball away from Holt. On the first play of the second overtime period, Jake Delhomme threw a 69-yard touchdown pass to Steve Smith to win the game. It marked the first double-overtime game and longest NFL game since 1987.

Panthers quarterback Jake Delhomme completed 16 of 26 passes for 290 yards and a touchdown, with 1 interception. Smith caught 6 passes for 163 yards and a touchdown. Bulger threw for 332 yards, but was intercepted three times. Rams receiver Isaac Bruce caught 7 passes for 116 yards

- Scoring
  - STL – field goal Wilkins 20 STL 3–0
  - STL – field goal Wilkins 26 STL 6–0
  - CAR – Muhammad fumble recovery in end zone (J.Kasay kick) CAR 7–6
  - STL – field goal Wilkins 24 STL 9–7
  - CAR – field goal Kasay 45 CAR 10–9
  - STL – field goal Wilkins 51 STL 12–10
  - CAR – field goal Kasay 52 CAR 13–12
  - CAR – field goal Kasay 34 CAR 16–12
  - CAR – Hoover 7 run (Kasay kick) CAR 23–12
  - STL – Faulk 1 run (Looker pass from Bulger) CAR 23–20
  - STL – field goal Wilkins 33 Tie 23–23
  - CAR – Smith 69 pass from Delhomme CAR 29–23

=== NFC Championship ===
Carolina Panthers 14, Philadelphia Eagles 3

Quarter	1	2	3	4	Total
Panthers	0	7	7	0	14
Eagles	0	3	0	0	3

at Lincoln Financial Field, Philadelphia

- Date: Sunday, January 18, 2004
- Game time: 6:30 p.m. EST
- Game weather: 33 °F (0.6 °C), cloudy
- Game attendance: 65,158
- Referee: Bernie Kukar
- TV announcers (Fox): Joe Buck (play-by-play), Troy Aikman, Cris Collinsworth (color commentators), and Pam Oliver (sideline reporter)

Carolina's defense shut down the Eagles offense, only allowing a field goal and holding Donovan McNabb to just 10 of 22 completions for 100 yards. Rookie cornerback Ricky Manning, Jr. intercepted McNabb 3 times, while the Panthers defense recorded a total of five sacks. McNabb also sustained a lower-rib injury early in the game but stayed in until the second half. Although Carolina's offense only scored 14 points, it was more than enough for the team to earn their first trip to the Super Bowl with a 14–3 win. For the Eagles, it was the third straight NFC Championship Game loss.

After a scoreless first quarter, the Panthers mounted the only long scoring drive of the game, advancing the ball 79 yards and scoring with Jake Delhomme's 24-yard touchdown pass to Muhsin Muhammad. The Eagles responded by driving 44 yards and scoring with a 41-yard field goal from David Akers. Philadelphia then forced a punt and drove to their own 44-yard line, but McNabb was intercepted by Manning and the score remained 7–3 at halftime.

The Eagles took the second half kickoff and drove to the Panthers 18-yard line before Manning ended the drive with his second interception. Then after a punt, Manning recorded his third interception and returned it 13 yards to the Eagles 37-yard line. Four plays later, DeShaun Foster's 1-yard touchdown run increased Carolina's lead to 14–3.

In the fourth quarter, the Eagles had one last chance to come back, driving 74 yards in 11 plays to the Panthers 11-yard line. But linebacker Dan Morgan picked off a pass from backup quarterback Koy Detmer in the end zone with 5:16 left in regulation. The next time Philadelphia got the ball back, they turned the ball over on downs and Carolina ran out the clock to win the game.

- Scoring
  - CAR – Muhammad 24 pass from Delhomme (Kasay kick) CAR 7–0
  - PHI – field goal Akers 41 CAR 7–3
  - CAR – Foster 1 run (Kasay kick) CAR 14–3

=== Super Bowl XXXVIII ===
New England Patriots 32, Carolina Panthers 29

Quarter	1	2	3	4	Total
Panthers	0	10	0	19	29
Patriots	0	14	0	18	32

at Reliant Stadium, Houston, Texas

- Date: Sunday, February 1, 2004
- Game time: 6:30 p.m. EST
- Game weather: Played indoors, domed stadium
- Game attendance: 71,525
- Referee: Ed Hochuli
- TV announcers (CBS): Greg Gumbel (play-by-play), Phil Simms (color commentator), Armen Keteyian and Bonnie Bernstein (sideline reporters)

Most of the first half was a defensive struggle, with neither team able to score until late in the second quarter, despite several early scoring opportunities for New England. After Carolina was forced to punt on their opening drive, Patriots receiver Troy Brown gave his team great field position with a 28-yard return to the Panthers 47-yard line. The Patriots subsequently marched to the 9-yard line, but Carolina kept them out of the end zone and Adam Vinatieri missed a 31-yard field goal attempt. The Patriots forced Carolina to punt after 3 plays and again got the ball with great field position, receiving Todd Sauerbrun's 40-yard punt at the Panthers 49-yard line. New England then drove to the 31-yard line, but on third down, linebacker Will Witherspoon tackled Brown for a 10-yard loss on an end-around play, pushing the Patriots out of field goal range. Later on, New England drove 57 yards to the Panthers 18-yard line with 6 minutes left in the second period, but once again they failed to score as Carolina kept them out of the end zone and Vinatieri's 36-yard field goal attempt was blocked by Panthers defender Shane Burton.

Meanwhile, the Carolina offense was stymied by the New England defense, with quarterback Jake Delhomme completing just one out of his first nine passes, sacked three times, and fumbling once. That fumble occurred 3 plays after Vinatieri's second missed field goal; Delhomme lost the ball while being sacked by linebacker Mike Vrabel, and Patriots defensive tackle Richard Seymour recovered the ball at the Panthers 20-yard line. Two plays later, New England faced a third down and 7, but quarterback Tom Brady scrambled 12 yards to the 5-yard line for a first down. Then wide receiver Deion Branch caught a 5-yard touchdown pass from Brady on the next play.

Branch's touchdown came after 26:55 had elapsed in the game, setting the record for the longest amount of time a Super Bowl remained scoreless. The play also suddenly set off a scoring explosion from both teams for the remainder of the first half.

The Panthers stormed down the field on their ensuing possession, driving 95 yards in 8 plays, and tying the game on a 39-yard touchdown pass from Delhomme to wide receiver Steve Smith with just 1:07 left in the half.

The Patriots immediately countered with a 6-play, 78-yard scoring drive of their own. Starting from their own 22-yard line, Brady completed a 12-yard pass to wide receiver David Givens. Then after throwing an incompletion, Brady completed a long pass to Branch, who caught it at the Panthers 24-yard line in stride before being tackled at the 14-yard line for a 52-yard gain. Three plays later, Givens caught a 5-yard touchdown from Brady to give New England a 14–7 lead with only 18 seconds left in the half. The Patriots decided to squib kick the ensuing kickoff to prevent a long return, but their plan backfired as Carolina tight end Kris Mangum picked up the ball at his own 35-yard line and returned it 12 yards to the 47. Panthers running back Stephen Davis then ran for 21 yards on the next play to set up kicker John Kasay's 50-yard field goal as time expired in the half, cutting Carolina's deficit to 14–10.

The third quarter was scoreless as each team exchanged punts twice. But with 3:57 left in the period, the Patriots put together a 71-yard, 8-play scoring drive, featuring tight end Daniel Graham's 33-yard reception to advance to the Carolina 9-yard line. Running back Antowain Smith then capped off the drive with a 2-yard touchdown run on the second play on the final period to increase their lead, 21–10. This was the start of another scoring explosion, one that became one of the biggest explosions in Super Bowl history, with both teams scoring a combined 37 points in the last 15 minutes, the most ever in a single quarter of a Super Bowl.

Delhomme started out Carolina's ensuing drive with a 13-yard completion to wide receiver Muhsin Muhammad. After committing a false start penalty on the next play, Delhomme completed a pair of passes to Smith for gains of 18 and 22 yards. Running back DeShaun Foster then scored on a 33-yard touchdown run, cutting the Panthers' deficit to 21–16 after Delhomme's 2-point conversion pass fell incomplete. The Patriots responded on their ensuing possession by driving all the way to Carolina's 9-yard line, but the drive ended when Panthers defensive back Reggie Howard intercepted a third down pass from Brady in the end zone. Then on 3rd down from his own 15-yard line, Delhomme threw for the longest play from scrimmage in Super Bowl history, an 85-yard touchdown completion to Muhammad. Carolina's 2-point conversion attempt failed again, but they took their first lead of the game, 22–21, with 6:53 remaining.

However, New England retook the lead on their next drive, advancing 68 yards with the aid of a pair of completions from Brady to Givens for gains of 18 and 25 yards. Once again the Patriots were faced with third down and goal, but this time they scored with Brady's 1-yard pass to Vrabel, who had lined up in an eligible tight end position. Then on a two-point conversion attempt, running back Kevin Faulk took a direct snap and ran into the end zone to make the score 29–22. Despite amassing over 1,000 combined yards, Kevin Faulk's two-point conversion constituted the only points he scored all season.

The Panthers countered on their next possession. Foster started the drive with a 9-yard run and a 7-yard reception. After that, Delhomme completed a 19-yard pass to Muhammad, followed by a 31-yard completion to receiver Ricky Proehl. Ironically, Proehl, who caught the fourth quarter game-tying touchdown pass against the Patriots in Super Bowl XXXVI 2 years earlier for the St. Louis Rams, finished the drive with a 12-yard touchdown reception. Kasay's ensuing extra point tied the game, 29–29, with 1:08 to play in regulation and it appeared that the game would be the first Super Bowl ever to go into overtime.

However, Kasay kicked the ensuing kickoff out of bounds, giving New England the ball on their own 40-yard line. Brady calmly led the Patriots offense down the field with a 13-yard pass to Brown on second down. An offensive pass interference penalty on Brown pushed New England back to their own 43-yard line, but another 13-yard reception to Brown and a 4-yard pass to Graham brought up a critical 3rd down and 3 from the Carolina 40-yard line. The Panthers defense could not prevent the Patriots from gaining the first down, as Brady completed a clutch 17-yard pass to Branch. On the next play, Vinatieri kicked a 41-yard field goal to give New England the lead, 32–29, with four seconds left in the game. Carolina failed on their last chance, as Rod Smart went nowhere on the resulting kickoff, and the Patriots had won their second Super Bowl in three years. This was the fourth Super Bowl to be decided on a field goal in the final seconds. Super Bowl V was won on a last second kick by Jim O'Brien, Super Bowl XXV as Scott Norwood missed his field goal chance, and Super Bowl XXXVI as Adam Vinatieri made his.

It was the Panthers' only Super Bowl appearance until Super Bowl 50.

== Cardiac Cats ==
The Cardiac Cats were the nickname of the 2003 Carolina Panthers, who were known for close games often decided in the final minutes or the final play of the game. After finishing the season 11–5, the Panthers captured their first division title since 1996. They advanced to Super Bowl XXXVIII, but lost to the Patriots 32–29 after a last second field goal. Despite losing to the Patriots in the Super Bowl, the Cardiac Cats are still regarded as one of the NFL's best defensive lines from the early 2000s.

The "Cardiac Cats" played in five road overtime games during the season, winning four of them (an NFL record). This included a double overtime victory over the Rams in the Divisional playoffs (the fifth-longest game in NFL history). The team also tied an NFL record by winning seven games by 3 points or fewer, and led the NFL in comeback wins during the season.

=== Background ===
Following a league worst 1–15 finish in 2001, in which the Panthers lost an NFL record fifteen consecutive games (six of which by 3 points or less), Panthers head coach George Seifert was fired and replaced by former New York Giants defensive coordinator John Fox. In 2002, Fox helped transform the Panthers defense from the second worst to the second best, and the team improved six games to finish the season 7–9. Following the season, Fox sought to improve the Panthers offense, drafting players such Jordan Gross at offensive tackle. In addition, quarterback Jake Delhomme, running back Stephen Davis, and wide receiver Ricky Proehl were signed to the Panthers in the off-season.

=== Notable games ===
==== September 7 vs. Jacksonville Jaguars ====
In the first game of the regular season, the Panthers hosted fellow 1995 expansion team Jacksonville, but fell behind 17–0 in the third quarter. At this point, starting quarterback Rodney Peete was replaced by ex-New Orleans Saint Jake Delhomme. Delhomme opened up with a 13-yard touchdown pass to Muhsin Muhammad. After a John Kasay field goal, the Panthers blocked a Jaguars punt for a safety. Delhomme then hit Steve Smith with a 24-yard touchdown pass, with a failed two-point conversion. The Jaguars then exploded on a 65-yard Mark Brunell touchdown pass to Jermaine Lewis, but their two-point try was stopped as well. The Jaguars' 5-point lead wouldn't hold as Delhomme found Ricky Proehl with sixteen seconds remaining, giving the Panthers a 24–23 victory, and winning Delhomme a starting job at quarterback.

==== September 14 at Tampa Bay Buccaneers ====
In a battle of field goals, the Panthers clawed to a 9–3 lead, but the defending Super Bowl champions raced down field in the final minutes and Keenan McCardell caught a six-yard touchdown on the final play of regulation. The PAT would win the game for the Buccaneers, but the kick was blocked, and in the ensuing overtime the Panthers made the Buccaneers pay with John Kasay's fourth field goal of the game, and a 12–9 victory for the Panthers. A week later, their week 3 game was postponed due to Hurricane Isabel.

==== October 12 at Indianapolis Colts ====
Indianapolis was a week removed from the Colts' historic 38–35 comeback win in Tampa Bay and raced to a 13–3 halftime lead, but Delhomme erased the gap on two third-quarter drives, highlighted by a 52-yard touchdown pass to Steve Smith. The Panthers clawed to a 20–13 lead but Peyton Manning drove the Colts down field in the final minutes; Reggie Wayne caught a 25-yard score with 44 seconds left in regulation, but in overtime the Panthers won the toss and never let the ball go as John Kasay finished it off after nearly six minutes of overtime with a 47-yard field goal, giving the Panthers a 23–20 overtime win.

==== October 26 at New Orleans Saints ====
On the tenth anniversary of the official awarding of the Panthers franchise to Jerry Richardson, former Saint Delhomme led the Panthers to the Superdome. The Panthers rushed for 223 yards led by Stephen Davis' 178 yards and two touchdowns. The Saints, led by Deuce McAllister's 101 rushing yards, erased Panthers leads of 10–0, 17–13, and 20–17 to force overtime. New Orleans won the coin toss, but Julius Peppers forced a Deuce McAllister fumble on the Carolina 37. The Panthers drove down field and booted yet another Kasay field goal; this ended a 23–20 contest as the Panthers became the first team to ever win three straight overtime road games.

==== November 9 vs. Tampa Bay Buccaneers ====
Carolina broke out to a 20–7 lead through three quarters, but the Buccaneers rallied in the fourth quarter for 17 points. Tampa Bay took a 24–20 lead with 2:45 to go. The Buccaneers defense, however, failed to keep Carolina at bay, and Jake Delhomme swiftly led the Panthers to a come from behind, game-winning touchdown with 1:11 left.

==== December 7 at Atlanta Falcons ====
After racing to an 8–2 record, the Panthers hit a wall with consecutive losses to Dallas and Philadelphia, falling to 8–4. At the Georgia Dome, the Panthers faced the 2–10 Falcons as Michael Vick made his return following injury. Vick exploded to 141 rushing yards to go with 179 passing yards, offsetting Delhomme's 153 passing yards and Stephen Davis' 81 rushing yards. Delhomme was picked off once and the Panthers could not finish it off in regulation as Vick's one-yard touchdown halfway through the fourth helped lead to overtime. After several punts the Panthers had the ball deep in their own territory, but Delhomme was picked off by Kevin Mathis at his 32 and Mathis ran in the winning touchdown, a 20–14 Falcons overtime win – the Panthers only overtime loss of the season.

==== December 14 at Arizona Cardinals ====
Now 8–5, and coming off three consecutive losses, the Panthers traveled to Arizona to face the three-win Cardinals. Quarterback Josh McCown was picked off by Mike Minter, who ran the ball back for a 35-yard Panthers touchdown. But the Cardinals put up a fight as McCown led a drive ending in his 16-yard touchdown run; then Emmitt Smith scored only his second touchdown of the year, putting Arizona up 14–7 at the half. John Kasay's field goal in the third quarter preceded another "Cardiac Cat" finish as Delhomme found DeShaun Foster for a 31-yard touchdown. Neil Rackers tied the game at 17 for the Cardinals on a 44-yard field goal just before the two-minute warning, then Delhomme clawed the Panthers in range for a 49-yard Kasay field goal with four seconds in regulation and a 20–17 slump-ending Panthers win.

==== January 10, 2004 at St. Louis Rams, Divisional Playoffs ====
Coming off a 29–10 victory over Dallas in the Wild Card playoffs, the Panthers faced St. Louis in the divisional round. After Carolina jumped out to a 23–12 lead, St. Louis rallied back by scoring 11 points in the last 6 minutes to send the game into overtime. During the first possession of the first overtime period, the Panthers marched down to the Rams 22-yard line and kicker John Kasay made a 40-yard field goal that would have won the game, but the play was called back after a delay of game penalty. Kasay subsequently missed the 45-yard attempt wide right, and on the Rams ensuing possession, kicker Jeff Wilkins would attempt a 53-yard field goal. Unlike Kasay's, it was straight on, but it fell just inches short of the goalpost. On the first play of the second overtime period, and after Ricky Manning Jr. intercepted a Marc Bulger pass, Panthers quarterback Jake Delhomme threw a 69-yard touchdown pass to Steve Smith to give the Panthers a 29–23 win in the fifth-longest game in NFL history. This handed the Rams their first home loss in 14 games, and helped pave the way for Carolina's appearance in Super Bowl XXXVIII.

==== February 1, 2004 vs. New England Patriots, Super Bowl XXXVIII ====
At Super Bowl XXXVIII, neither team was able to put up points in the first quarter, and the game remained scoreless until near the end of the first half. However, 24 points were scored in the last 5 minutes of the first half, and the score going into halftime was 14–10 New England. The third quarter was also scoreless and it wasn't until late in the game that things heated up once again. The teams traded leads numerous times in the highest-scoring fourth quarter in Super Bowl history, including setting a record when Jake Delhomme hit Muhsin Muhammad for an 85-yard touchdown pass early in the fourth quarter. That pass made the score 22–21, Carolina and went down in the record books as the longest offensive play in Super Bowl history (a record which still stands). After New England responded with a touchdown of their own and a 2-point conversion to make it 29–22, Carolina would storm right back to tie the game with a touchdown pass to Ricky Proehl with 1:08 left in regulation, opening the possibility to the first overtime game in Super Bowl history. However, John Kasay's kickoff went out of bounds, giving the Patriots the ball on their own 40-yard line. Adam Vinatieri, who had won Super Bowl XXXVI two years earlier on a last-second field goal, repeated his heroics, connecting on a 41-yarder with four seconds left, even though he had already missed two field goals in the game. This gave the Patriots their second Super Bowl win in three years.
