= 2001 Carolina Panthers season =

NFL team season

- Owner: Jerry Richardson
- Head coach: George Seifert
- Offensive coordinator: Richard Williamson
- Defensive coordinator: John Marshall
- Home stadium: Ericsson Stadium

Results
- Record: 1–15
- Division place: 5th NFC West
- Playoffs: Did not qualify
- Pro Bowlers: TE Wesley Walls; WR Steve Smith; P Todd Sauerbrun

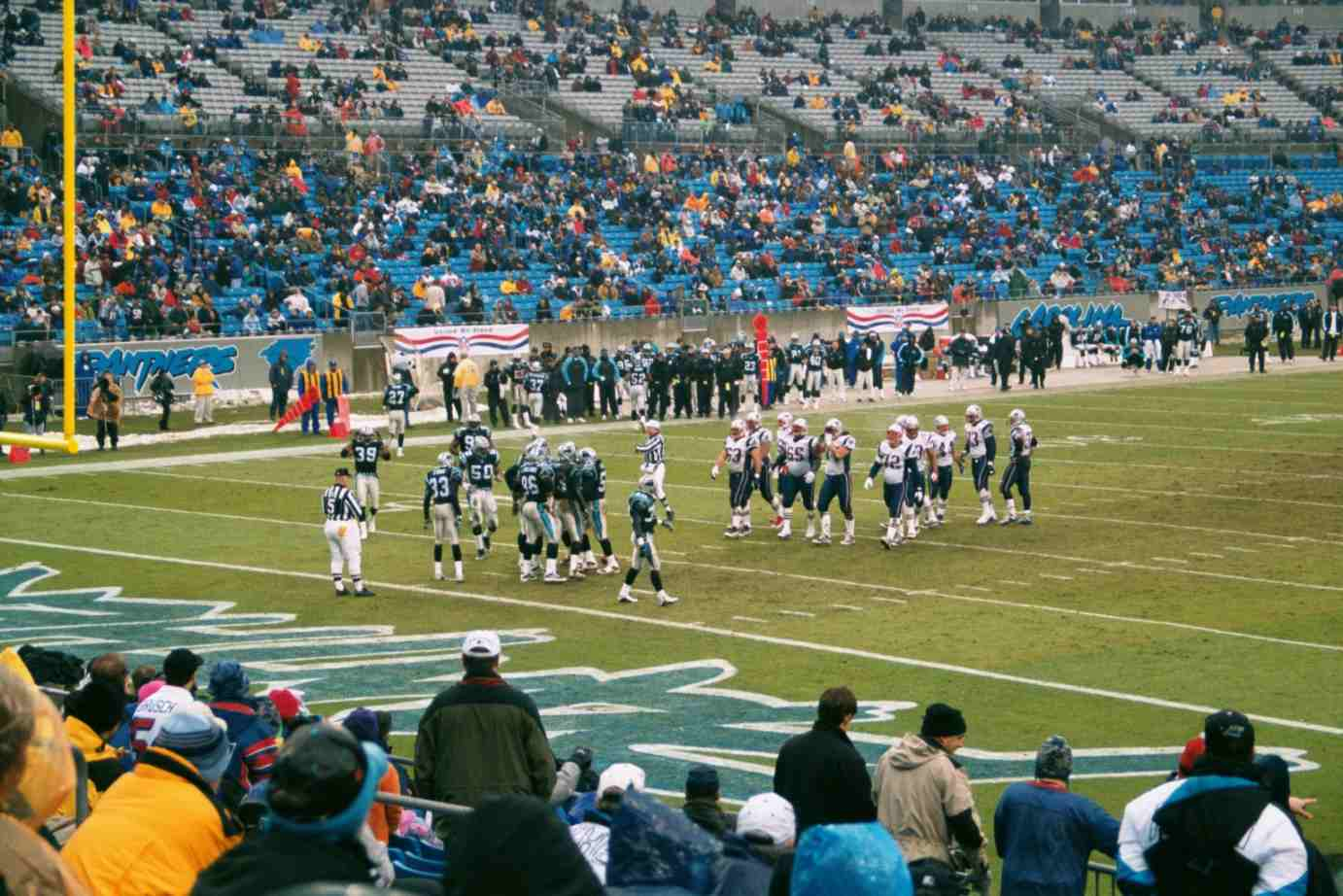
The New England Patriots at Carolina in Week 17 on January 6, 2002

The 2001 Carolina Panthers season was the franchise's 7th season in the National Football League (NFL) and the 3rd and final under head coach George Seifert. They tried to improve upon their 7–9 record in 2000, and make it to the playoffs for the second time in franchise history; however, the Panthers instead suffered one of the worst seasons in NFL history, en route to going 1–15.

The Panthers defeated the Minnesota Vikings in their opening game of the season, and then became the first team in the Super Bowl era to lose fifteen consecutive games afterwards. The Panthers were the only team since the expansion to 16 games in 1978 to win their 1st game and then lose every one afterwards until the 2020 Jacksonville Jaguars duplicated this feat.

The Panthers consequently beat the record for most consecutive losses during a single NFL season that had been shared by the 1976 Tampa Bay Buccaneers, 1980 New Orleans Saints, 1981 Baltimore Colts and 1990 New England Patriots. This record has since been broken by two winless teams: the 2008 Detroit Lions and 2017 Cleveland Browns. The 2001 Panthers also became the seventh team to finish 1–15.

Despite having the worst record in the league, the Panthers did not have the number-one overall draft pick in the 2002 NFL draft because it had been allocated to the incoming expansion Houston Texans (per NFL rules, an expansion team would automatically received the first pick in their first draft, unless they decide to trade it away); nonetheless, they used the second overall pick to draft defensive end Julius Peppers, the first Panthers draftee to enter the Pro Football Hall of Fame. This feat would be repeated in 2023, when the Panthers traded their number-one overall draft pick to the Chicago Bears.

In 2015, the Panthers went 15–1, becoming the first team in NFL history to have both 15 losses and 15 wins in a season; the 2023 team also went on to have a 15 loss season, finishing 2–15. To date, this remains the Panthers' worst season in franchise history.

== Offseason ==
Additions	Subtractions
T Todd Steussie (Vikings)	QB Steve Beuerlein (Broncos)
C Jeff Mitchell (Ravens)	LB Lee Woodall (Broncos)
G Kevin Donnalley (Dolphins)	G Matt Campbell (Redskins)
RB Richard Huntley (Steelers)	DE Reggie White (retirement)
DT Brentson Buckner (49ers)	CB Eric Davis (Broncos)
P Todd Sauerbrun (Chiefs)	S Eugene Robinson (retirement)
DT Larry Chester (Colts)	C Frank Garcia (Rams)
LB Chris Slade (Patriots)	RB Michael Bates (Redskins)

=== NFL draft ===
2001 Carolina Panthers draft
Round	Pick	Player	Position	College	Notes
1	11	Dan Morgan *	Linebacker	Miami (FL)	
2	44	Kris Jenkins *	Defensive tackle	Maryland	
3	74	Steve Smith *	Wide receiver	Utah	
4	106	Chris Weinke	Quarterback	Florida State	
5	143	Jarrod Cooper	Defensive back	Kansas State	
6	175	Dee Brown	Running back	Syracuse	
7	211	Louis Williams	Center	Louisiana State	
7	227	Mike Roberg	Tight end	Idaho	
Made roster * Made at least one Pro Bowl during career

=== Undrafted free agents ===
2001 undrafted free agents of note
Player	Position	College
Nick Goings	Running back	Pittsburgh
Nathan Hodel	Long snapper	Illinois

== Personnel ==
=== Staff ===
2001 Carolina Panthers staff
Front office: Owner/founder – Jerry Richardson; President – Mark Richardson; Director of football operations – Marty Hurney; Director of player personnel – Jack Bushofsky; Head coaches: Head coach – George Seifert; Offensive coaches: Assistant head coach/offensive coordinator – Richard Williamson; Quarterbacks – Turk Schonert; Running backs – Chick Harris; Wide receivers – Mike McCoy; Tight ends – Don Breaux; Offensive line – Paul Boudreau; Offensive assistant – Greg Roman	Defensive coaches: Assistant head coach/defensive coordinator – John Marshall; Defensive line – Jacob Burney; Linebackers – Sam Mills; Defensive Backs (Secondary) – Carlos Mainord; Defensive assistant – Alvin Reynolds; Special teams coaches: Special teams – Scott O'Brien; Assistant special teams coordinator/assistant strength and conditioning – Darrin Simmons; Strength and conditioning: Strength and conditioning – Jerry Simmons

=== Roster ===
2001 Carolina Panthers roster
Quarterbacks (QB): 5 Jim Harbaugh; 9 Matt Lytle; 16 Chris Weinke; Running backs (RB): 36 Nick Goings; 44 Chris Hetherington FB; 45 Brad Hoover FB; 34 Richard Huntley; Wide receivers (WR): 82 Isaac Byrd; 88 Karl Hankton; 81 Donald Hayes; 83 Patrick Jeffers; 87 Muhsin Muhammad; 89 Steve Smith; 15 Jim Turner; Tight ends (TE): 80 Luther Broughton; 84 Casey Crawford; 86 Kris Mangum	Offensive linemen (OL): 78 Jeno James G; 76 Leander Jordan G; 60 Jeff Mitchell C; 63 Jamar Nesbit C/G; 75 Todd Steussie T; 70 Chris Terry T; 73 Melvin Tuten T; 62 T. J. Washington T; 66 Louis Williams C; Defensive linemen (DL): 99 Brentson Buckner DT; 94 Sean Gilbert DE/DT; 77 Kris Jenkins DT; 91 Cedric Killings DT; 71 Al Lucas DT; 93 Mike Rucker DE; 96 Jay Williams DE; 92 Gillis Wilson DE	Linebackers (LB): 59 Darren Hambrick OLB; 54 Nate Hemsley OLB; 52 Kory Minor OLB; 55 Dan Morgan OLB; 50 Chris Slade OLB; 57 Lester Towns MLB; 95 Dean Wells; Defensive backs (DB): 46 Rashard Anderson CB; 40 Jarrod Cooper FS; 33 Doug Evans CB; 27 Deon Grant FS; 28 Deveron Harper CB; 37 Jimmy Hitchcock CB; 23 Reggie Howard CB; 30 Mike Minter SS; 39 Damien Richardson SS; Special teams (ST): 4 John Kasay K; 56 Jason Kyle LS; 10 Todd Sauerbrun P	Practice squad: 12 Anthony Bright WR; 74 Derrick Fletcher G; 41 Paris Johnson S; 24 Morgan Kane RB; Reserve: 21 Tim Biakabutuka RB (IR); 22 Dee Brown RB (IR); 64 Larry Chester DT (IR); 2 Dameyune Craig QB (IR); 65 Kevin Donnalley G (IR); 98 John Milem DE (IR); 53 Hannibal Navies LB (IR); 97 Jason Peter DE (IR); 85 Wesley Walls TE (IR); Rookies in italics 53 active, 9 reserve, 4 practice squad

== Regular season ==
=== Schedule ===
Week	Date	Opponent	Result	Record	Venue	Recap
1	September 9	at Minnesota Vikings	**W** 24–13	1–0	Hubert H. Humphrey Metrodome	Recap
2 (Note: The Panthers were originally scheduled to host the New England Patriots during Week 2 of the original NFL schedule (September 16) at Ericcson Stadium. However, due to the September 11 attacks, the game was rescheduled to Week 17.)	September 23	at **Atlanta Falcons**	**L** 16–24	1–1	Georgia Dome	Recap
3	September 30	Green Bay Packers	**L** 7–28	1–2	Ericsson Stadium	Recap
4	October 7	at **San Francisco 49ers**	**L** 14–24	1–3	3Com Park	Recap
5	October 14	**New Orleans Saints**	**L** 25–27	1–4	Ericsson Stadium	Recap
6	October 21	at Washington Redskins	**L** 14–17 (OT)	1–5	FedExField	Recap
7	October 28	New York Jets	**L** 12–13	1–6	Ericsson Stadium	Recap
8	November 4	at Miami Dolphins	**L** 6–23	1–7	Pro Player Stadium	Recap
9	November 11	at **St. Louis Rams**	**L** 14–48	1–8	Dome at America's Center	Recap
10	November 18	**San Francisco 49ers**	**L** 22–25 (OT)	1–9	Ericsson Stadium	Recap
11	November 25	**Atlanta Falcons**	**L** 7–10	1–10	Ericsson Stadium	Recap
12	December 2	at **New Orleans Saints**	**L** 23–27	1–11	Louisiana Superdome	Recap
13	December 9	at Buffalo Bills	**L** 24–25	1–12	Ralph Wilson Stadium	Recap
14	Bye					
15	December 23	**St. Louis Rams**	**L** 32–38	1–13	Ericsson Stadium	Recap
16	December 30	Arizona Cardinals	**L** 7–30	1–14	Ericsson Stadium	Recap
17	January 6	New England Patriots	**L** 6–38	1–15	Ericsson Stadium	Recap
Note: Intra-division opponents are in **bold** text.

=== Game summaries ===
==== Week 1: at Minnesota Vikings ====
Week 1: Carolina Panthers at Minnesota Vikings – Game summary

Quarter	1	2	3	4	Total
**Panthers**	7	3	7	7	**24**
Vikings	0	0	13	0	**13**

at Hubert H. Humphrey Metrodome, Minneapolis, Minnesota

- Date: September 9
- Game time: 1:00 p.m. EDT/12:00 p.m. CDT
- Game weather: None (played indoors)
- Game attendance: 64,108
- Referee: Wayne McKreight
- TV announcers (Fox): Ray Bentley, Jeff Lageman, and Mike Goldberg
- Recap

Game information

**First quarter**

- CAR – Steve Smith Sr. 93-yard kickoff return (John Kasay kick), 14:43. Panthers 7–0.

**Second quarter**

- CAR – John Kasay 23-yard field goal, 11:43. Panthers 10–0. **Drive: 7 plays, 41 yards, 3:34.**

**Third quarter**

- MIN – Daunte Culpepper 7-yard run (Gary Anderson kick), 9:09. Panthers 10–7. **Drive: 6 plays, 51 yards, 3:09.**
- MIN – Cris Carter 12-yard pass from Daunte Culpepper (kick blocked), 6:05. Vikings 13–10. **Drive: 5 plays, 49 yards, 2:03.**
- CAR – Muhsin Muhammad 16-yard pass from Chris Weinke (John Kasay kick), 2:53. Panthers 17–13. **Drive: 7 plays, 80 yards, 3:12.**

**Fourth quarter**

- CAR – Chris Weinke 1-yard run (John Kasay kick), 9:52. Panthers 24–13. **Drive: 7 plays, 34 yards, 3:45.**

**Top passers**

- CAR – Chris Weinke – 13/22, 223 yards, TD, INT
- MIN – Daunte Culpepper – 22/38, 236 yards, TD, 3 INT

**Top rushers**

- CAR – Nick Goings – 25 rushes, 86 yards
- MIN – Daunte Culpepper – 12 rushes, 57 yards, TD

**Top receivers**

- CAR – Wesley Walls – 3 receptions, 74 yards
- MIN – Byron Chamberlain – 7 receptions, 83 yards

This would be Carolina's only victory of the 2001 season. The Panthers would not win again until week 1 of the 2002 season.

==== Week 2: at Atlanta Falcons ====
Week 2: Carolina Panthers at Atlanta Falcons – Game summary

Quarter	1	2	3	4	Total
Panthers	3	7	3	3	**16**
**Falcons**	7	3	7	7	**24**

at Georgia Dome, Atlanta, Georgia

- Date: September 23
- Game time: 1:00 p.m. EDT
- Game weather: None (played indoors)
- Game attendance: 47,804
- Referee: Bob McElwee
- TV announcers (Fox): Ray Bentley, Jeff Lageman, Matt Morrison
- Recap

Game information

**First quarter**

- ATL – Tony Martin 12-yard pass from Chris Chandler (Jay Feely kick), 7:20. Falcons 7–0. **Drive: 9 plays, 76 yards, 7:08.**
- CAR – John Kasay 30-yard field goal, 2:41. Falcons 7–3. **Drive: 10 plays, 63 yards, 3:44.**

**Second quarter**

- CAR – Chris Weinke 5-yard run (John Kasay kick), 8:34. Panthers 10–7. **Drive: 14 plays, 76 yards, 7:32.**
- ATL – Jay Feely 25-yard field goal, 1:38. Tied 10–10. **Drive: 13 plays, 67 yards, 5:43.**

**Third quarter**

- ATL – Jamal Anderson 94-yard pass from Chris Chandler (Jay Feely kick), 11:06. Falcons 17–10. **Drive: 1 play, 94 yards, 0:13.**
- CAR – John Kasay 26-yard field goal, 2:30. Falcons 17–13. **Drive: 8 plays, 38 yards, 2:20.**

**Fourth quarter**

- ATL – Michael Vick 2-yard run (Jay Feely kick), 12:36. Falcons 24–13. **Drive: 9 plays, 74 yards, 4:54.**
- CAR – John Kasay 31-yard field goal, 5:37. Falcons 24–16. **Drive: 13 plays, 67 yards, 5:36.**

**Top passers**

- CAR – Chris Weinke – 27/41, 276 yards
- ATL – Chris Chandler – 11/14, 244 yards, 2 TD, INT

**Top rushers**

- CAR – Nick Goings – 15 rushes, 57 yards
- ATL – Jamal Anderson – 25 rushes, 98 yards

**Top receivers**

- CAR – Muhsin Muhammad – 10 receptions, 132 yards
- ATL – Jamal Anderson – 1 reception, 94 yards, TD

==== Week 3: vs. Green Bay Packers ====
Week 3: Green Bay Packers at Carolina Panthers – Game summary

Quarter	1	2	3	4	Total
**Packers**	0	6	15	7	**28**
Panthers	0	7	0	0	**7**

at Ericsson Stadium, Charlotte, North Carolina

- Date: September 30
- Game time: 1:00 p.m. EDT
- Game weather: 64 °F (18 °C)
- Game attendance: 73,120
- Referee: Tony Corrente
- TV announcers (Fox): Sam Rosen, Bill Maas, Paul Butler
- Recap

Game information

**First quarter**

- No scoring plays

**Second quarter**

- CAR – Wesley Walls 3-yard pass from Chris Weinke (John Kasay kick), 13:44. Panthers 7–0. **Drive: 11 plays, 58 yards, 3:51.**
- GB – Ryan Longwell 42-yard field goal, 8:26. Panthers 7–3. **Drive: 9 plays, 69 yards, 3:50.**
- GB – Ryan Longwell 46-yard field goal, 0:58. Panthers 7–6. **Drive: 11 plays, 58 yards, 5:11.**

**Third quarter**

- GB – Bill Schroeder 12-yard pass from Brett Favre (Antonio Freeman pass from Brett Favre), 12:20. Packers 14–7. **Drive: 5 plays, 80 yards, 2:18.**
- GB – Bubba Franks 6-yard pass from Brett Favre (Ryan Longwell kick), 8:30. Packers 21–7. **Drive: 8 plays, 38 yards, 2:36.**

**Fourth quarter**

- GB – Corey Bradford 5-yard pass from Brett Favre (Ryan Longwell kick), 12:23. Packers 28–7. **Drive: 8 plays, 48 yards, 3:46.**

**Top passers**

- GB – Brett Favre – 25/39, 308 yards, 3 TD, 2 INT
- CAR – Chris Weinke – 18/30, 160 yards, TD, INT

**Top rushers**

- GB – Ahman Green – 19 rushes, 53 yards
- CAR – Richard Huntley – 5 rushes, 19 yards

**Top receivers**

- GB – Ahman Green – 6 receptions, 75 yards
- CAR – Donald Hayes – 4 receptions, 52 yards

==== Week 4: at San Francisco 49ers ====
Week 4: Carolina Panthers at San Francisco 49ers – Game summary

Quarter	1	2	3	4	Total
Panthers	0	7	7	0	**14**
**49ers**	0	10	14	0	**24**

at 3Com Park, San Francisco, California

- Date: October 7
- Game time: 8:30 p.m. EDT/5:30 p.m. PDT
- Game weather: 52 °F (11 °C)
- Game attendance: 66,944
- Referee: Terry McAulay
- TV announcers (ESPN): Mike Patrick, Joe Theismann, and Suzy Kolber
- Recap

==== Week 5: vs. New Orleans Saints ====
Week 5: New Orleans Saints at Carolina Panthers – Game summary

Quarter	1	2	3	4	Total
**Saints**	10	7	3	7	**27**
Panthers	0	6	6	13	**25**

at Ericsson Stadium, Charlotte, North Carolina

- Date: October 14
- Game time: 1:00 p.m. EDT
- Game weather: 71 °F (22 °C)
- Game attendance: 72,049
- Referee: Ron Winter
- TV announcers (Fox): Ray Bentley, John Jurkovic, Paul Butler
- Recap

==== Week 6: at Washington Redskins ====
Week 6: Carolina Panthers at Washington Redskins – Game summary

Quarter	1	2	3	4	OT	Total
Panthers	7	0	0	7	0	**14**
**Redskins**	0	0	0	14	3	**17**

at FedEx Field, Landover, Maryland

- Date: October 21
- Game time: 1:00 p.m. EDT
- Game weather: 71 °F (22 °C)
- Game attendance: 74,480
- Referee: Bill Carollo
- TV announcers (Fox): Kenny Albert, Tim Green, Dave Feldman
- Recap

==== Week 7: vs. New York Jets ====
Week 7: New York Jets at Carolina Panthers – Game summary

Quarter	1	2	3	4	Total
**Jets**	7	0	3	3	**13**
Panthers	6	3	3	0	**12**

at Ericsson Stadium, Charlotte, North Carolina

- Date: October 28
- Game time: 1:00 p.m. EST
- Game weather: 51 °F (11 °C)
- Game attendance: 72,642
- Referee: Bill Leavy
- TV announcers (CBS): Kevin Harlan, Craig James, Beasley Reece
- Recap

Game information

**First quarter**

- CAR – Rashard Anderson 94-yard fumble return (kick failed), 8:27. Panthers 6–0.
- NYJ – Chris Hayes 7-yard blocked punt return (John Hall kick), 1:46. Jets 7–6.

**Second quarter**

- CAR – John Kasay 45-yard field goal, 0:00. Panthers 9–7. **Drive: 1 play, 0 yards, 0:02.**

**Third quarter**

- CAR – John Kasay 45-yard field goal, 12:10. Panthers 12–7. **Drive: 4 plays, 9 yards, 1:36.**
- NYJ – John Hall 43-yard field goal, 7:52. Panthers 12–10. **Drive: 8 plays, 36 yards, 4:18.**

**Fourth quarter**

- NYJ – John Hall 34-yard field goal, 4:53. Jets 13–12. **Drive: 4 plays, 5 yards, 2:00.**

**Top passers**

- NYJ – Vinny Testaverde – 21/34, 181 yards, 3 INT
- CAR – Chris Weinke – 12/34, 76 yards, INT

**Top rushers**

- NYJ – Curtis Martin – 27 rushes, 159 yards
- CAR – Richard Huntley – 14 rushes, 52 yards

**Top receivers**

- NYJ – Laveranues Coles – 7 receptions, 91 yards
- CAR – Donald Hayes – 3 receptions, 23 yards

Both offenses struggled throughout the game as the Jets gained 358 yards of total offense, but turned the ball over four times; conversely, the Panthers only had one turnover, but only gained 162 yards of total offense. Carolina scored first, with Rashard Anderson recovering a fumble and returning it 94 yards for a touchdown, but John Kasay missed the extra point. New York would respond late in the second quarter, with Chris Hayes returning a blocked punt 7 yards for a touchdown. The Panthers would score six unanswered points with a pair of 45-yard field goals from Kasay to go up 12–7 early in the third. However, Kasay's missed extra point would prove to be costly as the Jets would respond with two field goals of their own to win 13–12.

==== Week 8: at Miami Dolphins ====
Week 8: Carolina Panthers at Miami Dolphins – Game summary

Quarter	1	2	3	4	Total
Panthers	3	3	0	0	**6**
**Dolphins**	3	10	0	10	**23**

at Pro Player Stadium, Miami, Florida

- Date: November 4
- Game time: 1:00 p.m. EST
- Game weather: 75 °F (24 °C)
- Game attendance: 72,597
- Referee: Ron Blum
- TV announcers (Fox): Sam Rosen, Bill Maas, Joe Zagacki
- Recap

==== Week 9: at St. Louis Rams ====
Week 9: Carolina Panthers at St. Louis Rams – Game summary

Quarter	1	2	3	4	Total
Panthers	0	7	7	0	**14**
**Rams**	21	10	14	3	**48**

at Dome at America's Center, St. Louis, Missouri

- Date: November 11
- Game time: 1:00 p.m. EST/12:00 p.m. CST
- Game weather: None (played indoors)
- Game attendance: 66,069
- Referee: Johnny Grier
- TV announcers (Fox): Joe Buck, Brian Baldinger
- Recap

==== Week 10: vs. San Francisco 49ers ====
Week 10: San Francisco 49ers at Carolina Panthers – Game summary

Quarter	1	2	3	4	OT	Total
**49ers**	0	7	7	8	3	**25**
Panthers	7	3	3	9	0	**22**

at Ericsson Stadium, Charlotte, North Carolina

- Date: November 18
- Game time: 1:00 p.m. EST
- Game weather: 60 °F (16 °C)
- Game attendance: 72,665
- Referee: Gerry Austin
- TV announcers (Fox): Sam Rosen, Tim Green, Paul Butler
- Recap

==== Week 11: vs. Atlanta Falcons ====
Week 11: Atlanta Falcons at Carolina Panthers – Game summary

Quarter	1	2	3	4	Total
**Falcons**	3	7	0	0	**10**
Panthers	0	0	0	7	**7**

at Ericsson Stadium, Charlotte, North Carolina

- Date: November 25
- Game time: 1:00 p.m. EST
- Game weather: 73 °F (23 °C)
- Game attendance: 72,234
- Referee: Tony Corrente
- TV announcers (Fox): Ray Bentley, Jeff Lageman, D.J. Johnson
- Recap

==== Week 12: at New Orleans Saints ====
Week 12: Carolina Panthers at New Orleans Saints – Game summary

Quarter	1	2	3	4	Total
Panthers	7	0	3	13	**23**
**Saints**	0	10	3	14	**27**

at Louisiana Superdome, New Orleans, Louisiana

- Date: December 2
- Game time: 1:00 p.m. EST/12:00 p.m. CST
- Game weather: None (played indoors)
- Game attendance: 70,020
- Referee: Bill Leavy
- TV announcers (Fox): Scott Graham, Sean Jones, Joe Trahan
- Recap

==== Week 13: at Buffalo Bills ====
Week 13: Carolina Panthers at Buffalo Bills – Game summary

Quarter	1	2	3	4	Total
Panthers	3	21	0	0	**24**
**Bills**	3	10	6	6	**25**

at Ralph Wilson Stadium, Orchard Park, New York

- Date: December 9
- Game time: 1:00 p.m. EST
- Game weather: 40 °F (4 °C)
- Game attendance: 44,549
- Referee: Bill Carollo
- TV announcers (Fox): Curt Menefee, Ray Bentley, Bob Trimble
- Recap

==== Week 15: vs. St. Louis Rams ====
Week 15: St. Louis Rams at Carolina Panthers – Game summary

Quarter	1	2	3	4	Total
**Rams**	7	14	10	7	**38**
Panthers	7	6	10	9	**32**

at Ericsson Stadium, Charlotte, North Carolina

- Date: December 23
- Game time: 1:00 p.m. EST
- Game weather: 51 °F (11 °C)
- Game attendance: 72,438
- Referee: Gerry Austin
- TV announcers (Fox): Curt Menefee, Brian Baldinger
- Recap

==== Week 16: vs. Arizona Cardinals ====
Week 16: Arizona Cardinals at Carolina Panthers – Game summary

Quarter	1	2	3	4	Total
**Cardinals**	7	20	3	0	**30**
Panthers	0	7	0	0	**7**

at Ericsson Stadium, Charlotte, North Carolina

- Date: December 30
- Game time: 1:00 p.m. EST
- Game weather: 42 °F (6 °C)
- Game attendance: 72,025
- Referee: Mike Carey
- TV announcers (Fox): Ray Bentley, Jeff Lageman, Paul Butler
- Recap

==== Week 17: vs. New England Patriots ====
Week 17: New England Patriots at Carolina Panthers – Game summary

Quarter	1	2	3	4	Total
**Patriots**	10	0	14	14	**38**
Panthers	0	3	3	0	**6**

at Ericsson Stadium, Charlotte, North Carolina

- Date: January 6, 2002
- Game time: 1:00 p.m. EST
- Game weather: 36 °F (2 °C)
- Game attendance: 71,907
- Referee: Tom White
- TV announcers (CBS): Kevin Harlan, Craig James, Beasley Reece
- Recap

Game information

**First quarter**

- NE – Adam Vinatieri 19-yard field goal, 10:04. Patriots 3–0. **Drive: 11 plays, 52 yards, 4:13.**
- NE – Ty Law 46-yard interception return (Adam Vinatieri kick), 7:58. Patriots 10–0.

**Second quarter**

- CAR – John Kasay 29-yard field goal, 6:25. Patriots 10–3. **Drive: 10 plays, 57 yards, 4:19.**

**Third quarter**

- NE – Troy Brown 68-yard punt return (Adam Vinatieri kick), 8:30. Patriots 17–3.
- CAR – John Kasay 40-yard field goal, 4:46. Patriots 17–6. **Drive: 7 plays, 48 yards, 2:09.**
- NE – Antowain Smith 32-yard run (Adam Vinatieri kick), 1:29. Patriots 24–6. **Drive: 6 plays, 63 yards, 2:37.**

**Fourth quarter**

- NE – Jermaine Wiggins 5-yard pass from Tom Brady (Adam Vinatieri kick), 10:38. Patriots 31–6. **Drive: 3 plays, 9 yards, 0:09.**
- NE – Otis Smith 76-yard interception return (Adam Vinatieri kick), 5:45. Patriots 38–6.

**Top passers**

- NE – Tom Brady – 17/29, 198 yards, TD, 2 INT
- CAR – Chris Weinke – 15/36, 144 yards, 3 INT

**Top rushers**

- NE – Antowain Smith – 21 rushes, 81 yards, TD
- CAR – Richard Huntley – 21 rushes, 168 yards

**Top receivers**

- NE – David Patten – 4 receptions, 54 yards
- CAR – Brad Hoover – 4 receptions, 44 yards

With the loss, the Panthers lost their 15th game in a row and finished the season at 1–15. The Panthers finished with the worst record in the NFL, but only received the second overall pick in the 2002 NFL draft due to the first overall pick being awarded to the Houston Texans, an expansion team. This would be the last game the Panthers played as a member of the NFC West as they were moved to the newly formed NFC South starting next season. Carolina was joined by New Orleans, Atlanta (both also coming from the NFC West), and Tampa Bay (from the NFC Central, which was renamed to the NFC North). Carolina was also swept by the AFC East, and as of 2026, this the only season the Panthers failed to win a home game.

Head coach George Seifert would be fired the following day, finishing his tenure at Carolina with a record of 16–32 and zero playoff appearances.

== Standings ==
NFC West
	W	L	T	PCT	PF	PA	STK
^{(1)} St. Louis Rams	14	2	0	.875	503	273	W6
^{(5)} San Francisco 49ers	12	4	0	.750	409	282	W1
New Orleans Saints	7	9	0	.438	333	409	L4
Atlanta Falcons	7	9	0	.438	291	377	L2
Carolina Panthers	1	15	0	.063	253	410	L15
