= 2000 Carolina Panthers season =

NFL team season

- Owner: Jerry Richardson
- Head coach: George Seifert
- Offensive coordinator: Bill Musgrave
- Defensive coordinator: John Marshall
- Home stadium: Ericsson Stadium

Results
- Record: 7–9
- Division place: 3rd NFC West
- Playoffs: Did not qualify
- All-Pros: ST Michael Bates 1st team
- Pro Bowlers: KR Michael Bates

The 2000 season was the Carolina Panthers' sixth in the National Football League (NFL) and their second under head coach George Seifert. They failed to improve upon their 8–8 record in 1999 and finished third in the division, behind the playoff-bound St. Louis Rams and New Orleans Saints. For the first time since 1985, DE Reggie White failed to reach the Pro Bowl.

== Offseason ==
=== NFL draft ===
The 2000 NFL draft took place at Radio City Music Hall in New York City on April 15 and April 16, 2000. The Panthers selected seven players in seven rounds.

2000 Carolina Panthers draft
Round	Pick	Player	Position	College	Notes
1	23	Rashard Anderson	Cornerback	Jackson State	
2	57	Deon Grant	Safety	Tennessee	
3	82	Leander Jordan	Offensive tackle	Indiana (PA)	
4	120	Alvin McKinley	Defensive tackle	Mississippi State	
5	147	Gillis Wilson	Defensive end	Southern	
6	182	Jeno James	Guard	Auburn	
7	221	Lester Towns	Linebacker	Washington	
Made roster

=== Undrafted free agents ===
2000 undrafted free agents of note
Player	Position	College
Casey Crawford	Tight end	Virginia
Brad Hoover	Fullback	Western Carolina
Paris Lenon	Linebacker	Richmond

== Staff ==
2000 Carolina Panthers staff
Front office: Owner/founder – Jerry Richardson; President – Mark Richardson; Director of football operations – Marty Hurney; Director of player personnel – Jack Bushofsky; Head coaches: Head coach – George Seifert; Assistant head coach-offense – Richard Williamson; Offensive coaches: Offensive coordinator – Bill Musgrave; Running backs – Chick Harris; Tight ends – Don Breaux; Offensive line – Tony Wise; Offensive assistant/quarterbacks – Mike McCoy; Offensive assistant – Greg Roman	Defensive coaches: Assistant head coach/defensive coordinator – John Marshall; Defensive line – Jacob Burney; Linebackers – Sam Mills; Defensive Backs (Secondary) – Carlos Mainord; Defensive assistant – Alvin Reynolds; Special teams coaches: Special teams – Scott O'Brien; Assistant special teams coordinator/assistant strength and conditioning – Darrin Simmons; Strength and conditioning: Strength and conditioning – Jerry Simmons

== Roster ==
2000 Carolina Panthers roster
Quarterbacks (QB): 7 Steve Beuerlein; 2 Dameyune Craig; 8 Jeff Lewis; 9 Matt Lytle; Running backs (RB): 24 Michael Bates; 21 Tim Biakabutuka; 44 Chris Hetherington FB; 45 Brad Hoover FB; Wide receivers (WR): 82 Isaac Byrd KR; 14 Karl Hankton; 81 Donald Hayes; 10 Kerry Hood; 87 Muhsin Muhammad; 89 Iheanyi Uwaezuoke PR; Tight ends (TE): 84 Casey Crawford; 88 Brian Kinchen LS; 86 Kris Mangum	Offensive linemen (OL): 66 Matt Campbell G/T; 64 James Dexter G; 65 Frank Garcia C; 78 Jeno James T; 75 Clarence Jones T; 76 Leander Jordan G/T; 63 Jamar Nesbit G; 70 Chris Terry T; 73 Melvin Tuten T; Defensive linemen (DL): 94 Sean Gilbert DT; 71 Al Lucas DT; 99 Alvin McKinley DT; 90 Tim Morabito DT; 93 Mike Rucker DE; 98 Eric Swann DT; 92 Reggie White DE; 96 Jay Williams DE; 60 Gillis Wilson DE	Linebackers (LB): 58 O. J. Childress MLB; 59 Michael Hawkes MLB; 53 Hannibal Navies OLB; 57 Lester Towns MLB; 95 Dean Wells OLB; 54 Lee Woodall OLB; Defensive backs (DB): 46 Rashard Anderson CB/S; 25 Eric Davis CB; 33 Doug Evans CB; 29 Ray Green FS; 28 Deveron Harper CB; 37 Jimmy Hitchcock CB; 42 Reggie Howard CB; 30 Mike Minter SS; 39 Damien Richardson SS; 41 Eugene Robinson FS; Special teams (ST): 6 Joe Nedney K; 13 Ken Walter P	Practice squad: 77 Dan Best T; 61 Jon Blackman T; 16 Darryl Daniel WR; 26 Wilmont Perry RB; Reserve: 31 Tony Booth S (IR); 72 Robert Daniel DE (PUP); 40 William Floyd FB (IR); 27 Deon Grant S (IR); 45 Lamont Green LB (NF-Inj.); 83 Patrick Jeffers WR (IR); 4 John Kasay K (IR); 52 Kory Minor LB (IR); 97 Jason Peter DE (IR); 56 Spencer Reid LB (IR); 91 Chuck Smith DE (IR); 67 Bryan Stoltenberg C/G (IR); 15 Jim Turner WR (IR); 85 Wesley Walls TE (IR); Rookies in italics 53 active, 14 reserve, 4 practice squad

== Schedule ==
=== Preseason ===
Week	Date	Opponent	Result	Record	Venue	NFL.com recap
1	August 4	Jacksonville Jaguars	**L** 14–34	0–1	Ericsson Stadium	Recap
2	August 10	at Pittsburgh Steelers	**L** 0–13	0–2	Three Rivers Stadium	Recap
3	August 18	Baltimore Ravens	**L** 13–24	0–3	Ericsson Stadium	Recap
4	August 24	at New England Patriots	**L** 21–29	0–4	Foxboro Stadium	Recap

=== Regular season ===
Week	Date	Opponent	Result	Record	Venue	NFL.com recap
1	September 3	at Washington Redskins	**L** 17–20	0–1	FedExField	Recap
2	September 10	at **San Francisco 49ers**	**W** 38–22	1–1	3Com Park	Recap
3	September 17	**Atlanta Falcons**	**L** 10–15	1–2	Ericsson Stadium	Recap
4	Bye					
5	October 1	Dallas Cowboys	**L** 13–16 (OT)	1–3	Ericsson Stadium	Recap
6	October 8	Seattle Seahawks	**W** 26–3	2–3	Ericsson Stadium	Recap
7	October 15	at **New Orleans Saints**	**L** 6–24	2–4	Louisiana Superdome	Recap
8	October 22	**San Francisco 49ers**	**W** 34–16	3–4	Ericsson Stadium	Recap
9	October 29	at **Atlanta Falcons**	**L** 12–13	3–5	Georgia Dome	Recap
10	November 5	at **St. Louis Rams**	**W** 27–24	4–5	Trans World Dome	Recap
11	November 12	**New Orleans Saints**	**L** 10–20	4–6	Ericsson Stadium	Recap
12	November 19	at Minnesota Vikings	**L** 17–31	4–7	Hubert H. Humphrey Metrodome	Recap
13	November 27	Green Bay Packers	**W** 31–14	5–7	Ericsson Stadium	Recap
14	December 3	**St. Louis Rams**	**W** 16–3	6–7	Ericsson Stadium	Recap
15	December 10	at Kansas City Chiefs	**L** 14–15	6–8	Arrowhead Stadium	Recap
16	December 17	San Diego Chargers	**W** 30–22	7–8	Ericsson Stadium	Recap
17	December 24	at Oakland Raiders	**L** 9–52	7–9	Network Associates Coliseum	Recap
Note: Intra-division opponents are in **bold** text.

== Standings ==
NFC West
	W	L	T	PCT	PF	PA	STK
^{(3)} New Orleans Saints	10	6	0	.625	354	305	L1
^{(6)} St. Louis Rams	10	6	0	.625	540	471	W1
Carolina Panthers	7	9	0	.438	310	310	L1
San Francisco 49ers	6	10	0	.375	388	422	L1
Atlanta Falcons	4	12	0	.250	252	413	W1
