= Deon Grant =

American football player (born 1979)

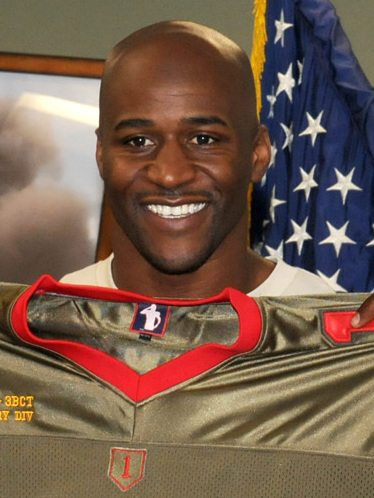
- Grant in 2012

No. 27, 37, 24, 34
- Position: Safety

Personal information
- Born: March 14, 1979 (age 47); Augusta, Georgia, U.S.
- Listed height: 6 ft 2 in (1.88 m)
- Listed weight: 215 lb (98 kg)

Career information
- High school: Josey (Augusta)
- College: Tennessee
- NFL draft: 2000: 2nd round, 57th overall pick

Career history
- Carolina Panthers (2000–2003); Jacksonville Jaguars (2004–2006); Seattle Seahawks (2007–2009); New York Giants (2010–2011)

Awards and highlights
- Super Bowl champion (XLVI); BCS National Championship (1998); Consensus All-American (1999); First-team All-SEC (1999)

Career NFL statistics
- Total tackles: 776
- Sacks: 6.5
- Forced fumbles: 4
- Fumble recoveries: 10
- Interceptions: 30
- Stats at Pro Football Reference

Deon D'Marquis Grant (born March 14, 1979) is an American former professional football player who was a safety for 12 seasons in the National Football League (NFL). He played college football for the Tennessee Volunteers football, was a member of Tennessee's national championship team and earned All-American honors. He was selected by the Carolina Panthers in the second round of the 2000 NFL draft, and also played professionally for the Jacksonville Jaguars, Seattle Seahawks and New York Giants of the NFL. He won a Super Bowl ring with the Giants against the New England Patriots.

== College career ==
Grant attended the University of Tennessee, and played for the Tennessee Volunteers football team from 1997 to 1999. He was selected as a consensus first-team All-American in 1999 after he tied for the NCAA lead with nine interceptions for 167 return yards. He finished the 1999 season with 69 tackles and eight pass breakups. He had two picks in three different games and earned SEC Defensive Player of the week after intercepting three passes versus Auburn. His leaping interception in UT's overtime win over Florida in 1998 was a crucial play in the Vols' march to the BCS National Championship. Grant left Tennessee and declared for the NFL draft following his junior year.

== Professional career ==
=== Carolina Panthers ===
The Carolina Panthers selected Grant in the second round (57th overall) of the 2000 NFL draft. Grant was the fifth safety drafted and was the second safety the Panthers drafted in 2000 following first round pick (23rd overall) Rashard Anderson.

==== 2000 season ====
On July 13, 2000, the Carolina Panthers signed Grant to a four—year, $2.11 million rookie contract that included an initial signing bonus of $900,000.

Entering training camp, Grant competed against fellow rookie Rashard Anderson for a starting role at safety after it was left vacant following the departure of Brent Alexander in free agency. On July 26, 2000, Grant was rushed to the Spartanburg Regional Medical Center after he suffered a severe leg injury while participating in a pass coverage drill during training camp. The following day, the Panthers announced Grant would be expected to miss his entire rookie season after it was discovered he had dislocated his hip and suffered a severe hip fracture.

==== 2001 season ====
Upon returning from injury, Grant started training camp slated to earn the starting role at free safety. Head coach George Seifert named Grant the starting free safety to begin the regular season. He started the first two games alongside Damien Richardson due to an injury to starting strong safety Mike Minter.

On September 9, 2001, Grant earned his first career start and made his professional regular season debut in the Carolina Panthers' season-opener at the Minnesota Vikings and made two combined tackles (one solo), a pass deflection, and made his first career interception on a pass attempt by Daunte Culpepper to wide receiver Randy Moss as they won 24—13. On December 2, 2001, Grant recorded four combined tackles (three solo), set a season-high with three pass deflections, and had the first sack of his career on Aaron Brooks for an 11—yard loss during a 23—27 loss at the New Orleans Saints. In Week 15, he set a season-high with eight solo tackles during a 38—32 loss to the St. Louis Rams. On January 6, 2002, Grant made four combined tackles (three solo), two pass deflections, and set a season-high with two interceptions on pass attempts by Tom Brady as the Panthers lost 38—6 to the New England Patriots. He started in all 16 games for the first time in his career and made 71 combined tackles (59 solo), 13 pass deflections, five interceptions, and one sack.

==== 2002 season ====
On January 7, 2002, the Carolina Panthers fired head coach George Seifert after they finished the 2002 NFL season with an 1—15 record. On January 26, 2002, the Panthers hired New York Giants' defensive coordinator John Fox to be their new head coach. Defensive coordinator Jack Del Rio retained Grant and Mike Minter as the starting safeties to begin the regular season. On September 22, 2002, Grant made four combined tackles (two solo), three pass deflections, and set a career-high with three interceptions on passes thrown by Daunte Culpepper during a 21—14 victory at the Minnesota Vikings. His performance earned him NFC Defensive Player of the Week for Week 3. In Week 11, he set a season-high with seven combined tackles (six solo) and had two pass break-ups during a 10—23 loss at the Tampa Bay Buccaneers. He started all 16 games for the second consecutive season and made 68 combine tackles (54 solo), 16 pass deflections, three interceptions, a forced fumble, and a fumble recovery.

==== 2003 season ====
Grant and Mike Minter returned as the starting safeties to begin the regular season in 2003. In Week 4, Grant set a career-high with 12 combined tackles (nine solo) as the Panthers defeated the Atlanta Falcons 23—3. In Week 17, he made five combined tackles (three solo), two pass deflections, and intercepted a pass Jesse Palmer attempted to throw to wide receiver Amani Toomer during a 37—24 victory at the New York Giants. He started all 16 games throughout the 2003 NFL season and finished with a total of 77 combined tackles (65 solo), 12 pass deflections, three interceptions, a fumble recovery, and one sack.

The Carolina Panthers finished the 2003 NFL season first in the NFC South with an 11—5 record to earn a playoff berth. On January 3, 2004, Grant started in his first career postseason game and recorded one solo tackle as the Panthers defeated the Dallas Cowboys 29—10 in the NFC Wild-Card Game. On January 10, 2004, Grant started in the NFC Divisional Round and recorded four solo tackles, made one pass deflection, and intercepted a pass Marc Bulger threw to wide receiver Tory Holt during a 29—23 double overtime victory at the St. Louis Rams. The following week, the Panthers won the NFC Championship Game 14—3 at the Philadelphia Eagles to advance to the Super Bowl. On February 1, 2004, Grant started in Super Bowl XXXVIII and recorded five combined tackles (three solo) and had one pass break-up as the Panthers lost 32—29 to the New England Patriots.

=== Jacksonville Jaguars ===
==== 2004 season ====
On March 9, 2004, the Jacksonville Jaguars signed Grant to a three—year, $7.25 million contract that included an initial signing bonus of $2.50 million. He was reunited with head coach Jack Del Rio who was previously the Panthers' defensive coordinator in 2002. He entered training camp slated as the starting free safety after Rashean Mathis was transitioned to cornerback. Defensive coordinator Mike Smith named Grant the starting free safety to begin the regular season and paired him with strong safety Donavin Darius.

On December 19, 2004, Grant tied his season-high of seven combined tackles (five solo), made one pass deflection, a fumble recovery, and had his first interception as a member of the Jaguars on a pass Brett Favre attempted to throw to wide receiver Donald Driver during a 28—25 victory at Green Bay Packers. He started in all 16 games throughout the 2004 NFL season and finished with 65 combined tackles (50 solo), eight pass deflections, two interceptions, a fumble recovery, and one sack.

==== 2005 season ====
Head coach Jack Del Rio retained Grant and Donavin Darius as the starting safeties to begin the season. On November 27, 2005, Grant set a season-high with nine combined tackles (seven solo), made two pass deflections, and intercepted Kurt Warner's pass to wide receiver Anquan Boldin during a 24—17 victory at the Arizona Cardinals. He started in all 16 games for the fifth consecutive season and made 66 combined tackles (55 solo), 11 pass deflections, three interceptions, and 1.5 sacks.

==== 2006 season ====
On October 1, 2006, Grant set a season-high with eight combined tackles (seven solo), one pass deflection, and a fumble recovery during a 30—36 overtime loss at the Washington Redskins. He started all 16 games throughout the 2006 NFL season and finished with 60 combined tackles (53 solo), eight pass deflections, two interceptions, and a fumble recovery.

=== Seattle Seahawks ===
==== 2007 season ====
On March 9, 2007, the Seattle Seahawks signed Grant to a six—year, $31.82 million contract as an unrestricted free agent that included $10.50 million guaranteed and a signing bonus of $5.50 million. During free agency, Grant received interest from multiple teams and met with the Seahawks and New Orleans Saints. His contract made him the third highest paid safety in the league.

He was reunited with defensive coordinator John Marshall, who was also the defensive coordinator for the Carolina Panthers during Grant's first two seasons in 2001—2002. Entering training camp, Grant was slated as the de facto starting free safety, replacing Ken Hamlin who departed in free agency. Grant was transitioned to strong safety following the sudden emergence of Brian Russell during training camp as the starting free safety. Head coach Mike Holmgren named Grant the starting strong safety to begin the regular season, supplanting Michael Boulware.

On September 23, 2007, Grant set a season-high with nine combined tackles (eight solo), one pass deflection, a fumble recovery, and had his first interception with the Seahawks on a pass Carson Palmer threw to wide receiver T.J. Houshmandzadeh as the defeated the Cincinnati Bengals 21—24. He started in all 16 games in 2007, marking 112 consecutive regular season starts in-a-row. He finished with 78 combined tackles (65 solo), 10 pass deflections, three interceptions, and a fumble recovery.

==== 2008 season ====
He returned as the starting strong safety in 2008 and was paired with starting free safety Brian Russell. On September 21, 2008, Grant recorded four solo tackles, set a season-high with three pass deflections, and intercepted Marc Bulger's pass attempt to wide receiver Donnie Avery as the Seahawks routed the St. Louis Rams 37—13. In Week 12, he set a season-high with nine combined tackles (eight solo) and had a pass break-up during a 17—20 loss to the Washington Redskins. He finished the 2008 NFL season with a career-high 79 combined tackles (62 solo), eight pass deflections, and two interceptions in 16 games and 16 starts.

==== 2010 season ====
On March 15, 2010, the Seattle Seahawks released Grant with three years remaining on his contract due to salary cap concerns. He finished his tenure in Seattle with 224 tackles, eight interceptions, and one fumble recovery.

=== New York Giants ===
On April 1, 2010, the New York Giants signed Grant to a one—year, $4 million contract. On April 16, 2011, the New York Giants re-signed Grant to a one—year, $910,000 contract. The Giants signed Grant in order to provide necessary depth at safety following the departure of C. C. Brown. He entered training camp as the primary backup safety and provided necessary insurance after C. C. Brown struggled to perform well in Kenny Phillips place following a season-ending injury to Phillips. Head coach Tom Coughlin named Grant a backup and listed him as the primary backup safety behind starting tandem, Kenny Phillips and Antrel Rolle.

On September 12, 2010, Grant recorded two combined tackles (one solo), set a season-high with two pass deflections, and intercepted David Carr's pass to tight end Gary Barnidge as the Giants won 18—31 against the Carolina Panthers. In Week 4, he made two combined tackles (one solo), a pass deflection, recovered a fumble, and intercepted a pass Todd Collins attempted to throw to tight end Greg Olsen as the Giants routed the Chicago Bears 3—17. In Week 6, Grant set a season-high with 11 combined tackles (eight solo), forced a fumble, and made a fumble recovery as the Giants defeated the Detroit Lions 28—20. He finished the 2010 NFL season with 72 combined tackles (56 solo), 10 pass deflections, three interceptions, three fumble recoveries, two forced fumbles, and one sack in 16 games and eight starts.

He won a Super Bowl ring in Super Bowl XLVI. Following the season, he became an unrestricted free agent.

On August 7, 2013, Grant retired as a member of the New York Giants.

== NFL statistics ==
=== Regular season ===
Year	Team	GP	Tackles				Fumbles			Interceptions					
Year	Team	GP	Comb	Solo	Ast	Sack	FF	FR	Yds	Int	Yds	Avg	Lng	TD	PD
2000	CAR	0	Did not play due to injury												
2001	CAR	16	71	59	12	1.0	0	0	0	5	96	19.2	43	0	13
2002	CAR	16	67	53	14	0.0	1	1	0	3	16	5.3	10	0	16
2003	CAR	16	77	65	12	1.0	0	1	0	3	25	8.3	25	0	12
2004	JAX	16	65	50	15	1.0	0	1	0	2	4	2.0	4	0	8
2005	JAX	16	66	55	11	1.5	0	0	0	3	29	9.7	29	0	10
2006	JAX	16	60	53	7	0.0	0	1	0	2	25	12.5	24	0	7
2007	SEA	16	77	65	12	0.0	0	1	0	3	34	11.3	34	0	10
2008	SEA	16	79	62	17	0.0	0	0	0	2	31	15.5	31	0	8
2009	SEA	16	78	60	18	0.0	1	1	0	3	7	2.3	7	0	8
2010	NYG	16	72	56	16	1.0	2	3	0	3	0	0.0	0	0	10
2011	NYG	16	64	45	19	1.0	0	1	1	1	0	0.0	0	0	6
Career		146	776	623	153	6.5	4	10	1	30	267	8.9	43	0	108

=== Postseason ===
Year	Team	GP	Tackles				Fumbles		Interceptions					
Year	Team	GP	Comb	Solo	Ast	Sack	FF	FR	Int	Yds	Avg	Lng	TD	PD
2003	CAR	4	18	15	3	0.0	0	0	1	16	16.0	16	0	4
2005	JAX	1	5	3	2	0.0	0	0	0	0	0.0	0	0	0
2007	SEA	2	10	8	2	0.0	0	0	0	0	0.0	0	0	2
2011	NYG	4	19	17	2	0.0	0	1	1	0	0.0	0	0	3
Career		11	52	43	9	0.0	0	1	2	16	8.0	16	0	9
