= 1998 Carolina Panthers season =

NFL team season

- Owner: Jerry Richardson
- Head coach: Dom Capers
- Offensive coordinator: Gil Haskell
- Defensive coordinator: Vic Fangio
- Home stadium: Ericsson Stadium

Results
- Record: 4–12
- Division place: 4th NFC West
- Playoffs: Did not qualify
- All-Pros: None
- Pro Bowlers: TE Wesley Walls; WR Michael Bates; LB Kevin Greene

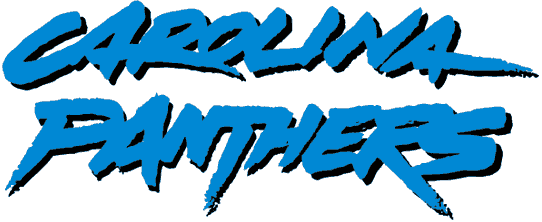
Carolina Panthers wordmark between 1996 and 2011.

The 1998 Carolina Panthers season was the franchise's 4th season in the National Football League (NFL) and the fourth and final under head coach Dom Capers. They tried to improve upon their 7–9 record in 1997, and make it to the playoffs for the second time in franchise history, but failed and finished at a franchise worst 4–12 in 1998 and fourth of five teams in the NFC West. Capers was fired at the end of the season and replaced by George Seifert.

== Offseason ==
=== NFL draft ===
The 1998 NFL draft took place at Radio City Music Hall in New York City on April 18 and April 19, 1998. The Panthers selected eight players in seven rounds.

1998 Carolina Panthers draft
Round	Pick	Player	Position	College	Notes
1	14	Jason Peter	Defensive tackle	Nebraska	
3	62	Chuck Wiley	Defensive end	LSU	
3	73	Mitch Marrow	Defensive end	Pennsylvania	
4	106	Donald Hayes	Wide receiver	Wisconsin	
5	136	Jerry Jensen	Linebacker	Washington	
6	165	Damien Richardson	Defensive back	Arizona State	
7	196	Vili Maumau	Defensive tackle	Colorado	
7	228	Jim Turner	Wide receiver	Syracuse	
Made roster

=== Undrafted free agents ===
1998 undrafted free agents of note
Player	Position	College
Dameyune Craig	Quarterback	Auburn
Paul Janus	Tackle	Northwestern

== Personnel ==
=== Staff ===
1998 Carolina Panthers staff
Front office: Owner/founder – Jerry Richardson; President – Mark Richardson; Director of football operations – Marty Hurney; Director of player personnel – Jack Bushofsky; Head coaches: Head coach – Dom Capers; Offensive coaches: Offensive coordinator – Gil Haskell; Quarterbacks – John Shoop; Running backs – Chick Harris; Wide receivers – Richard Williamson; Tight ends – Don Breaux; Offensive line – Jim McNally; Offensive quality control – Greg Roman	Defensive coaches: Defensive coordinator – Vic Fangio; Defensive line – Ted Gill; Linebackers – Kevin Steele; Outside linebackers – Billy Davis; Defensive Backs (Secondary) – Steve Shafer; Defensive assistant – Sam Mills; Defensive quality control/defensive backs – Brett Maxie; Special teams coaches: Special teams – Brad Seely; Strength and conditioning: Strength and conditioning – Chip Morton

=== Roster ===
1998 Carolina Panthers roster
Quarterbacks (QB): 7 Steve Beuerlein; 16 Dameyune Craig; 9 Shane Matthews; Running backs (RB): 21 Tim Biakabutuka; 34 Mike Dulaney FB; 40 William Floyd FB; 23 Anthony Johnson; 32 Fred Lane; 20 Winslow Oliver PR; Wide receivers (WR): 82 Michael Bates KR; 83 Mark Carrier; 88 Donald Hayes; 81 Rocket Ismail; 87 Muhsin Muhammad; 80 Dwight Stone KR; Tight ends (TE): 84 Luther Broughton; 86 Kris Mangum; 85 Wesley Walls	Offensive linemen (OL): 79 Rob Bohlinger T; 78 Blake Brockermeyer T; 66 Matt Campbell G/T; 76 Norberto Davidds-Garrido T; 65 Frank Garcia C/G; 64 Corbin Lacina G; 61 Anthony Redmon G; 67 Bryan Stoltenberg C; Defensive linemen (DL): 93 Mike Fox; 94 Sean Gilbert DE; 69 Les Miller; 95 Tim Morabito NT; 97 Jason Peter DE; 71 Rick Terry NT	Linebackers (LB): 56 Micheal Barrow ILB; 52 Jeff Brady ILB; 91 Kevin Greene OLB; 53 Jerry Jensen ILB; 59 Ernest Jones OLB; 95 Greg Lloyd OLB; 54 Spencer Reid ILB; 92 Tarek Saleh OLB; 50 Kinnon Tatum ILB; Defensive backs (DB): 46 Brent Alexander S; 43 Juran Bolden CB; 25 Eric Davis CB; 29 Steve Lofton CB; 27 Lenny McGill CB; 30 Mike Minter SS; 39 Damien Richardson SS; 36 Tony Veland FS; 37 Leonard Wheeler CB/S; Special teams (ST): 4 John Kasay K; 72 Danny Villa LS; 13 Ken Walter P	Practice squad: 74 Paul Janus C; 75 Glenn Rountree G; 70 Todd Stewart T; Reserve: 89 Rae Carruth WR (IR); 33 Doug Evans CB (IR); 44 Derwin Gray S (IR); 60 Bucky Greeley C (IR); 96 Shawn King DE (Susp.); 57 Lamar Lathon LB (IR); 68 Mitch Marrow DE (IR); 35 Ryan Sutter S (IR); 26 Michael Swift CB (IR); 15 Jim Turner WR (IR); 99 Chuck Wiley DE (IR); 73 Jamie Wilson G/T (IR); Rookies in italics 53 active, 12 reserve, 3 practice squad

== Schedule ==
Week	Date	Opponent	Result	Record	Venue	Attendance
1	September 6	**Atlanta Falcons**	**L** 14–19	0–1	Ericsson Stadium	65,129
2	September 13	at **New Orleans Saints**	**L** 14–19	0–2	Louisiana Superdome	51,915
3	Bye					
4	September 27	Green Bay Packers	**L** 30–37	0–3	Ericsson Stadium	69,723
5	October 4	at **Atlanta Falcons**	**L** 23–51	0–4	Georgia Dome	50,724
6	October 11	at Dallas Cowboys	**L** 20–27	0–5	Texas Stadium	64,181
7	October 18	at Tampa Bay Buccaneers	**L** 13–16	0–6	Raymond James Stadium	63,600
8	October 25	Buffalo Bills	**L** 14–30	0–7	Ericsson Stadium	64,050
9	November 1	**New Orleans Saints**	**W** 31–17	1–7	Ericsson Stadium	62,514
10	November 8	at **San Francisco 49ers**	**L** 23–25	1–8	3Com Park	68,572
11	November 15	Miami Dolphins	**L** 9–13	1–9	Ericsson Stadium	67,887
12	November 22	at **St. Louis Rams**	**W** 24–20	2–9	Trans World Dome	50,716
13	November 29	at New York Jets	**L** 21–48	2–10	Giants Stadium	71,501
14	December 6	**San Francisco 49ers**	**L** 28–31 (OT)	2–11	Ericsson Stadium	63,332
15	December 13	Washington Redskins	**L** 25–28	2–12	Ericsson Stadium	46,940
16	December 20	**St. Louis Rams**	**W** 20–13	3–12	Ericsson Stadium	50,047
17	December 27	at Indianapolis Colts	**W** 27–19	4–12	RCA Dome	58,182
Note: Intra-division opponents are in **bold** text.

== Standings ==
NFC West
	W	L	T	PCT	PF	PA	STK
^{(2)} Atlanta Falcons	14	2	0	.875	442	289	W9
^{(4)} San Francisco 49ers	12	4	0	.750	479	328	W1
New Orleans Saints	6	10	0	.375	305	359	L3
Carolina Panthers	4	12	0	.250	336	413	W2
St. Louis Rams	4	12	0	.250	285	378	L2
