= Kris Jenkins =

American football player (born 1979)

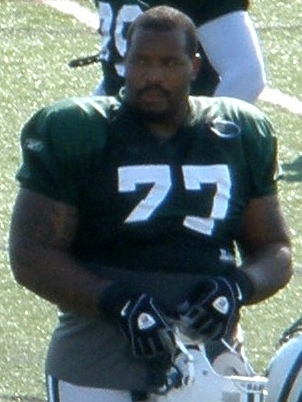
- Jenkins with the New York Jets in 2009

No. 77
- Position: Defensive tackle

Personal information
- Born: August 3, 1979 (age 47); Ypsilanti, Michigan, U.S.
- Listed height: 6 ft 5 in (1.96 m)
- Listed weight: 360 lb (163 kg)

Career information
- High school: Belleville (Belleville, Michigan)
- College: Maryland
- NFL draft: 2001: 2nd round, 44th overall pick

Career history
- Carolina Panthers (2001–2007); New York Jets (2008–2010)

Awards and highlights
- 3× First-team All-Pro (2002, 2003, 2008); 4× Pro Bowl (2002, 2003, 2006, 2008); Second-team All-ACC (2000)

Career NFL statistics
- Total tackles: 279
- Sacks: 24.0
- Forced fumbles: 2
- Fumble recoveries: 2
- Stats at Pro Football Reference

Kristopher Rudy-Charles Jenkins (born August 3, 1979) is an American former professional football player who was a defensive tackle for the Carolina Panthers and New York Jets of the National Football League (NFL). He played college football for the Maryland Terrapins. He was selected by the Panthers in the second round of the 2001 NFL draft. A three-time All-Pro and four-time Pro Bowl selection, Jenkins played seven seasons for the Panthers before being traded to the Jets in 2008.

== College career ==
Jenkins played college football at the University of Maryland, where he started 27 of 41 games. He made the second-team All-ACC during his senior season. He finished with 9.5 sacks and 154 tackles.

== Professional career ==
=== 2001 NFL draft ===
Jenkins was selected in the second round of the 2001 NFL draft by Carolina.

Pre-draft measurables
Height	Weight	Arm length	Hand span	40-yard dash	10-yard split	20-yard split	20-yard shuttle	Three-cone drill	Vertical jump	Broad jump	Bench press
6 ft 4 7/8 in (1.95 m)	318 lb (144 kg)	34 in (0.86 m)	9 1/2 in (0.24 m)	5.13 s	1.81 s	2.96 s	4.40 s	7.85 s	31 in (0.79 m)	9 ft 0 in (2.74 m)	33 reps
All values from NFL Combine

=== Carolina Panthers (2001–2007) ===
Jenkins finished the 2002 season with 60 tackles and 7 sacks, en route to an alternate appearance on the NFC's Pro Bowl team, where he replaced an injured Warren Sapp. The following season, he helped the Panthers on their way to Super Bowl XXXVIII. In one game against the Tampa Bay Buccaneers, Jenkins blocked two kicks: a field goal attempt by Martin Gramatica, and an extra point attempt that would have won the game. Jenkins' second block marked the first time that an extra point was blocked to send a game into overtime (Carolina later won the game). Jenkins was rewarded with his first Pro Bowl start, and joined teammate Mike Rucker as half of the NFC's defensive front line.

However, the 2004 NFL season saw Jenkins suffer a shoulder injury in the second game against Kansas City, and he spent the latter half of the season on injured reserve. His injuries continued during the first game of the 2005 NFL season when he tore his anterior cruciate ligament and was once again placed on injured reserve.

=== New York Jets (2008–2010) ===
On February 29, 2008, the Carolina Panthers traded Jenkins to the New York Jets for third- and fifth-round draft picks in the 2008 NFL draft. The Panthers selected Charles Godfrey and Gary Barnidge with the traded picks. For much of his first season with the Jets, Jenkins was dominant and garnered heavy consideration for the NFL's Defensive Player of the Year award. On Sunday October 18, 2009, Jenkins left the game against the Buffalo Bills with a left knee injury. The next day, it was reported that he had a torn ACL and would be out for the rest of the season. During the home opener against the Baltimore Ravens on September 13, 2010, Jenkins was injured as he twisted his leg making a tackle. A few days later, an MRI revealed that Jenkins had again torn his ACL and was out for the rest of the 2010 season.

The Jets released Jenkins on February 28, 2011.

=== Retirement ===
Jenkins announced his retirement from football on July 20, 2011.

== NFL career statistics ==
=== Regular season ===
Year	Team	Games		Tackles					Interceptions					Fumbles			
Year	Team	GP	GS	Cmb	Solo	Ast	Sck	Sfty	Int	Yds	Lng	TD	PD	FF	FR	Yds	TD
2001	CAR	16	11	34	27	7	2.0	0	0	0	0	0	0	0	1	0	0
2002	CAR	16	16	44	36	8	7.0	0	0	0	0	0	3	0	0	0	0
2003	CAR	16	16	46	39	7	5.0	0	0	0	0	0	4	1	1	0	0
2004	CAR	4	4	11	8	3	1.0	0	0	0	0	0	0	0	0	0	0
2005	CAR	1	1	2	0	2	0.0	0	0	0	0	0	0	0	0	0	0
2006	CAR	16	16	41	32	9	3.0	0	0	0	0	0	1	0	0	0	0
2007	CAR	16	15	38	30	8	2.5	0	0	0	0	0	1	0	0	0	0
2008	NYJ	16	16	52	37	15	3.5	0	0	0	0	0	2	1	0	0	0
2009	NYJ	6	6	13	11	2	0.0	0	0	0	0	0	0	0	0	0	0
2010	NYJ	1	1	1	0	1	0.0	0	0	0	0	0	0	0	0	0	0
Career		108	102	282	220	62	24.0	0	0	0	0	0	11	2	2	0	0

== Personal life ==
Prior to the 2011 NFL season, Jenkins joined SNY as an analyst for New York Jets. His job included appearing on Jets programs such as pre-game and post-game shows and Jets Game Plan. He is the older brother of former defensive end Cullen Jenkins, and the father of Kris Jenkins Jr., who was an All-American at the University of Michigan. Jenkins Jr. went on to be drafted by the Cincinnati Bengals in the second round of the 2024 NFL draft.
