= Dan Morgan =

American football player and executive (born 1978)

Carolina Panthers
- Title: President of football operations/general manager

Personal information
- Born: December 19, 1978 (age 47); Coral Springs, Florida, U.S.
- Listed height: 6 ft 2 in (1.88 m)
- Listed weight: 245 lb (111 kg)

Career information
- Position: Linebacker (No. 55)
- High school: J. P. Taravella (Coral Springs)
- College: Miami (FL) (1997–2000)
- NFL draft: 2001: 1st round, 11th overall pick

Career history

Playing
- Carolina Panthers (2001–2007); New Orleans Saints (2008–2009)*
- * Offseason or practice squad member only

Operations
- Seattle Seahawks (2010); Scout (2010); Assistant director of pro personnel (2011-2014); Director of pro personnel (2015-2017); Buffalo Bills (2018–2020) Director of player personnel; Carolina Panthers (2021-present); Assistant general manager (2021-2023); President of football operations/general manager (2024-present)

Awards and highlights
- Pro Bowl (2004); PFWA All-Rookie Team (2001); PFW All-Rookie Team (2001); Dick Butkus Award (2000); Bronko Nagurski Trophy (2000); Chuck Bednarik Award (2000); Lambert Award (2000); Unanimous All-American (2000); First-team All-Big East (2000); Big East Defensive Player of the Year (2000); As an executive: Super Bowl champion (XLVIII); NFL record: Most Tackles in a Super Bowl: 18 (11 Solo, 7 Ast) (XXXVIII)

Career NFL statistics
- Total tackles: 390
- Sacks: 7
- Forced fumbles: 3
- Fumble recoveries: 6
- Interceptions: 5
- Stats at Pro Football Reference
- Executive profile at Pro Football Reference
- College Football Hall of Fame

Daniel Thomas Morgan Jr. (born December 19, 1978) is an American professional football executive and former linebacker who is the president of football operations and general manager for the Carolina Panthers of the National Football League (NFL). He previously served as the assistant general manager for the Panthers, the director of player personnel for the Buffalo Bills and the director of pro personnel for the Seattle Seahawks.

Morgan played in the NFL for seven seasons and played college football for the Miami Hurricanes, earning unanimous All-American honors and winning multiple national awards. Morgan was drafted by the Carolina Panthers in the first round of the 2001 NFL draft, and he earned a Pro Bowl selection in 2004.

== Early life ==
Morgan was born in Coral Springs, Florida. He grew up playing football for the Clifton Heights Rams of the Bert Bell Football League near Philadelphia. After playing freshman football at Upper Darby High School in Upper Darby Township, Pennsylvania, Morgan attended J. P. Taravella High School in Coral Springs, Florida. As a senior, he was an all-county pick at tailback, linebacker, and strong safety for the Taravella Trojans. As a junior tailback, he rushed for 1,322 yards and 13 touchdowns.

== Playing career ==
=== College ===
Morgan attended the University of Miami and played for the Miami Hurricanes football team from 1997 to 2000. He began his college career playing as a fullback, but was switched to weakside linebacker one week before the season started. He became the first freshman linebacker to start for the Hurricanes since Ray Lewis in 1993. As a freshman, he was named second-team freshman All-American by the Sporting News after posting 105 tackles, three sacks, and one forced fumble.

As a sophomore, he became the first sophomore team captain in team history, and made the All-Big East Team, after leading the team with 150 tackles. He was a finalist for the Butkus Award and the Nagurski Trophy as a junior, and was rewarded with a second-team All-Big East for collecting 139 tackles and 5 sacks. He finally captured both awards, as well as the Bednarik Award, becoming the first player in NCAA history to win all three awards in a career (and the same year). He was recognized as a first-team All-Big East selection, the Big East Defensive Player of the Year, and a unanimous first-team All-American in 2000. Upon graduating, Morgan held the Hurricanes' team and Big East conference records for most career tackles with 532.

Morgan was inducted into the University of Miami Sports Hall of Fame in 2011.

=== National Football League ===
Pre-draft measurables
| Height | Weight |
|---|---|
| 6 ft 2 in (1.88 m) | 240 lb (109 kg) |
All values from NFL Combine

==== Carolina Panthers ====
Morgan was selected by the Carolina Panthers in the first round, with the 11th overall selection, in the 2001 NFL draft.

In the 2001 season, he started 11 games at weakside and strongside linebacker, posting 75 tackles, 1 sack, 1 interception and 1 fumble recovery.

In his second season, Morgan helped turn the Panthers from the worst defense in the 2001 NFL season to the second-ranked defense, becoming the first team to make such an improvement in one season. Morgan was also an integral part of the Panthers defense that led the team to Super Bowl XXXVIII, where he posted an NFL Super Bowl record 18 tackles (11 solo, 7 assists). For the 2004 NFL season, he collected 109 tackles, two interceptions, two fumble recoveries, and five sacks en route to being named the starting linebacker for the NFC in the 2004 Pro Bowl. In the 2005 NFL season, he was second on the team in tackles, behind Marlon McCree.

On November 6, 2007, Morgan was placed on injured reserve by the Panthers due to an ankle injury. The Panthers eventually released him on February 11, 2008.

==== New Orleans Saints ====
Morgan was signed by the New Orleans Saints for the 2008 season. However, on May 19, 2008, Morgan announced his retirement from the NFL, citing the slow recovery of injuries, particularly a partially torn Achilles tendon suffered during the 2007 season.

After sitting out the 2008 season, Morgan filed reinstatement papers with the NFL in 2009. He worked out with the Saints through the off-season before retiring again following a calf muscle injury suffered during minicamp.

== NFL career statistics ==
Regular season
| Year | Team | Games | | Tackles | | | | Interceptions | | | | | | Fumbles | |
| Year | Team | GP | GS | Comb | Solo | Ast | Sack | PD | Int | Yds | Avg | Lng | TD | FF | FR |
|---|---|---|---|---|---|---|---|---|---|---|---|---|---|---|---|
| 2001 | CAR | 11 | 11 | 67 | 45 | 22 | 1.0 | 2 | 1 | 10 | 10.0 | 10 | 0 | 0 | 1 |
| 2002 | CAR | 8 | 8 | 54 | 39 | 15 | 1.0 | 4 | 2 | 26 | 13.0 | 22 | 0 | 1 | 0 |
| 2003 | CAR | 11 | 11 | 66 | 46 | 20 | 0.0 | 1 | 0 | 0 | 0.0 | 0 | 0 | 0 | 2 |
| 2004 | CAR | 12 | 12 | 102 | 79 | 23 | 2.0 | 6 | 2 | 20 | 10.0 | 11 | 0 | 1 | 2 |
| 2005 | CAR | 13 | 13 | 77 | 59 | 18 | 3.0 | 2 | 0 | 0 | 0.0 | 0 | 0 | 1 | 1 |
| 2006 | CAR | 1 | 1 | 2 | 2 | 0 | 0.0 | 1 | 0 | 0 | 0.0 | 0 | 0 | 0 | 0 |
| 2007 | CAR | 3 | 3 | 22 | 16 | 6 | 0.0 | 1 | 0 | 0 | 0 | 0 | 0 | 0 | 0 |
| Career | | 59 | 59 | 390 | 284 | 106 | 7.0 | 17 | 5 | 56 | 11.2 | 22 | 0 | 3 | 6 |

Postseason
| Year | Team | Games | | Tackles | | | | Interceptions | | | | | | Fumbles | |
| Year | Team | GP | GS | Comb | Solo | Ast | Sack | PD | Int | Yds | Avg | Lng | TD | FF | FR |
|---|---|---|---|---|---|---|---|---|---|---|---|---|---|---|---|
| 2003 | CAR | 4 | 4 | 45 | 31 | 14 | 0.0 | 3 | 1 | -2 | -2.0 | -2 | 0 | 0 | 0 |
| 2005 | CAR | 3 | 3 | 14 | 9 | 5 | 1.0 | 0 | 0 | 0 | 0 | 0 | 0 | 0 | 0 |
| Career | | 7 | 7 | 59 | 40 | 19 | 1.0 | 3 | 1 | -2 | -2.0 | -2 | 0 | 0 | 0 |

== Executive career ==
=== Buffalo Bills ===
In May 2018, Morgan was hired by the Buffalo Bills as their director of player personnel.

=== Carolina Panthers ===
On May 8, 2021, Morgan was hired by the Carolina Panthers to be their assistant general manager.

On January 22, 2024, the Panthers appointed Morgan as their president of football operations and general manager, replacing Scott Fitterer.
