= Jarrod Cooper =

American football player (born 1978)

No. 40
- Position: Safety

Personal information
- Born: March 31, 1978 (age 48); Akron, Ohio, U.S.
- Listed height: 6 ft 1 in (1.85 m)
- Listed weight: 215 lb (98 kg)

Career information
- High school: Pearland (Pearland, Texas)
- College: Kansas State
- NFL draft: 2001: 5th round, 143rd overall pick

Career history
- Carolina Panthers (2001–2004); Oakland Raiders (2004–2007)

Awards and highlights
- First-team All-Big 12 (1998); Second-team All-Big 12 (1999)

Career NFL statistics
- Total tackles: 134
- Sacks: 1.5
- Forced fumbles: 2
- Fumble recoveries: 4
- Pass deflections: 3
- Defensive touchdowns: 1
- Stats at Pro Football Reference

Jarrod Alexander Cooper (born March 31, 1978) is an American former professional football player who was a safety with the Oakland Raiders and Carolina Panthers of the National Football League (NFL). He played college football for the Kansas State Wildcats and was selected by the Panthers in the fifth round of the 2001 NFL draft.

== Early life ==
Cooper played football and ran track and field for Pearland High School in Texas. He was an All-state selection in football as a senior and was a four-year letterman in track and field, excelling in the long jump, triple jump, and the 110-meter and 300-meter hurdles.

== College career ==
Cooper played college football for the Kansas State Wildcats where he was an All-Big 12 selection all four years. He was elected team captain as a junior and senior. After leaving Kansas State, he ranked 11th in school history in tackles.

== Professional career ==
Pre-draft measurables
Height	Weight	Arm length	Hand span	40-yard dash	10-yard split	20-yard split	20-yard shuttle	Three-cone drill	Vertical jump	Broad jump
6 ft 0 1/2 in (1.84 m)	222 lb (101 kg)	31 1/2 in (0.80 m)	9 1/2 in (0.24 m)	4.36 s	1.55 s	2.55 s	3.90 s	6.87 s	41.5 in (1.05 m)	10 ft 10 in (3.30 m)
All values from NFL Combine

=== Carolina Panthers ===
Cooper was drafted by the Carolina Panthers in the fifth round (143rd overall) of the 2001 NFL draft and played in Super Bowl XXXVIII.

=== Oakland Raiders ===
Cooper joined the Oakland Raiders on October 29, 2004, after being claimed off waivers. In 2005, he won the Ed Block Courage Award chosen by his teammates. He was also a team captain for the 2006 season.

Cooper was released by the Raiders prior to the 2007 season after failing a league mandated drug test. He was re-signed not long after he served his suspension, but was placed on season-ending injured reserve on December 17 with a torn ACL.

He was later released on August 25, 2008, and did not play during the 2008 and 2009 seasons.

Cooper has since revealed that head injuries (causing recurrent, debilitating migraines) and an uncertain medical prognosis were reasons for his "abrupt" retirement from the Oakland Raiders.

=== NFL statistics ===
Year	Team	GP	COMB	TOTAL	AST	SACK	FF	FR	FR YDS	INT	IR YDS	AVG IR	LNG	TD	PD
2001	CAR	16	27	25	2	0.0	0	0	0	0	0	0	0	0	0
2002	CAR	6	8	7	1	0.0	0	0	0	0	0	0	0	0	0
2003	CAR	12	7	7	0	0.0	0	0	0	0	0	0	0	0	0
2004	CAR	6	2	1	1	0.0	0	0	0	0	0	0	0	0	0
2004	OAK	9	16	16	0	1.0	0	0	0	0	0	0	0	0	1
2005	OAK	16	54	40	14	0.5	2	2	0	0	0	0	0	0	2
2006	OAK	16	12	11	1	0.0	0	0	0	0	0	0	0	0	0
2007	OAK	6	5	4	1	0.0	0	1	0	0	0	0	0	0	0
Career		87	131	111	20	1.5	2	3	0	0	0	0	0	0	3

== Personal life ==
In 2007 Cooper began volunteering at the Oakland Animal Shelter in Oakland California. He quickly became an integral part of the shelter's team of staff and volunteers, often spending hours walking the dogs, cleaning kennels, and performing various improvement tasks around the shelter. Eventually he donated funds for the construction of outdoor exercise runs for the dogs named "the Coop" He subsequently cofounded Help Code 597, a non-profit dedicated to helping the animals of Oakland. As of 2011, Cooper continued as a regular volunteer at the shelter.
