= Ray Green =

American football player (born 1977)

No. 29, 40, 29, 31
- Position: Defensive back

Personal information
- Born: March 22, 1977 (age 49); Queens, New York, U.S.
- Listed height: 6 ft 3 in (1.91 m)
- Listed weight: 195 lb (88 kg)

Career information
- High school: Burke
- College: South Carolina
- NFL draft: 2000: undrafted

Career history
- Carolina Panthers (2000); Miami Dolphins (2001–2002); New York Giants (2003); New York Jets (2003); New York Giants (2003); Miami Dolphins (2005)*
- * Offseason or practice squad member only
- Stats at Pro Football Reference

Raymond Green Jr. (born March 22, 1977) is an American former professional football player who was a defensive back for the Carolina Panthers, Miami Dolphins, New York Jets and New York Giants of the National Football League (NFL). He played college football for the South Carolina Gamecocks.
