= Paul Janus =

American football player (born 1975)

No. 74
- Position: Offensive tackle

Personal information
- Born: March 17, 1975 (age 51); Janesville, Wisconsin, U.S.
- Listed height: 6 ft 4 in (1.93 m)
- Listed weight: 294 lb (133 kg)

Career information
- High school: Edgerton (Edgerton, Wisconsin)
- College: Northwestern
- NFL draft: 1998: undrafted

Career history
- Carolina Panthers (1998); Detroit Lions (1999); Minnesota Vikings (2000)*; Chicago Enforcers (2001)
- * Offseason or practice squad member only

Career NFL statistics
- Games played: 5
- Games started: 1
- Stats at Pro Football Reference

Paul Scott Janus is a former player in the National Football League. He played with the Carolina Panthers during the 1998 NFL season. The following year, he was a member of the Detroit Lions, but did not see any playing time during the regular season.
