= Casey Moore =

American football player and coach (born 1980)

Biographical details
- Born: July 26, 1980 (age 46); Largo, Florida, U.S.

Playing career
- 1999–2002: Stanford
- 2003: Carolina Panthers
- 2004*: Tampa Bay Buccaneers
- 2004-2005*: Arizona Cardinals
- Position: Fullback

Coaching career (HC unless noted)
- 2008–2009: Stanford (assistant)
- 2010: Nevada (QC)
- 2011: Nevada (RB)

Casey Moore (born July 26, 1980) is an American former football player and coach.

Moore played college football at Stanford and was drafted by the Carolina Panthers. He was later on the practice squad of the Tampa Bay Buccaneers, and was also picked up by the Arizona Cardinals, but never played in a regular season game for either the Panthers, Buccaneers or Cardinals.

Moore was an assistant coach at Stanford for two years from 2008 to 2009. In 2010, he was hired as the quality control coach for the Nevada Wolf Pack football team and a year later, he was promoted to running backs coach.
