= Mike Minter =

American football player and coach (born 1974)

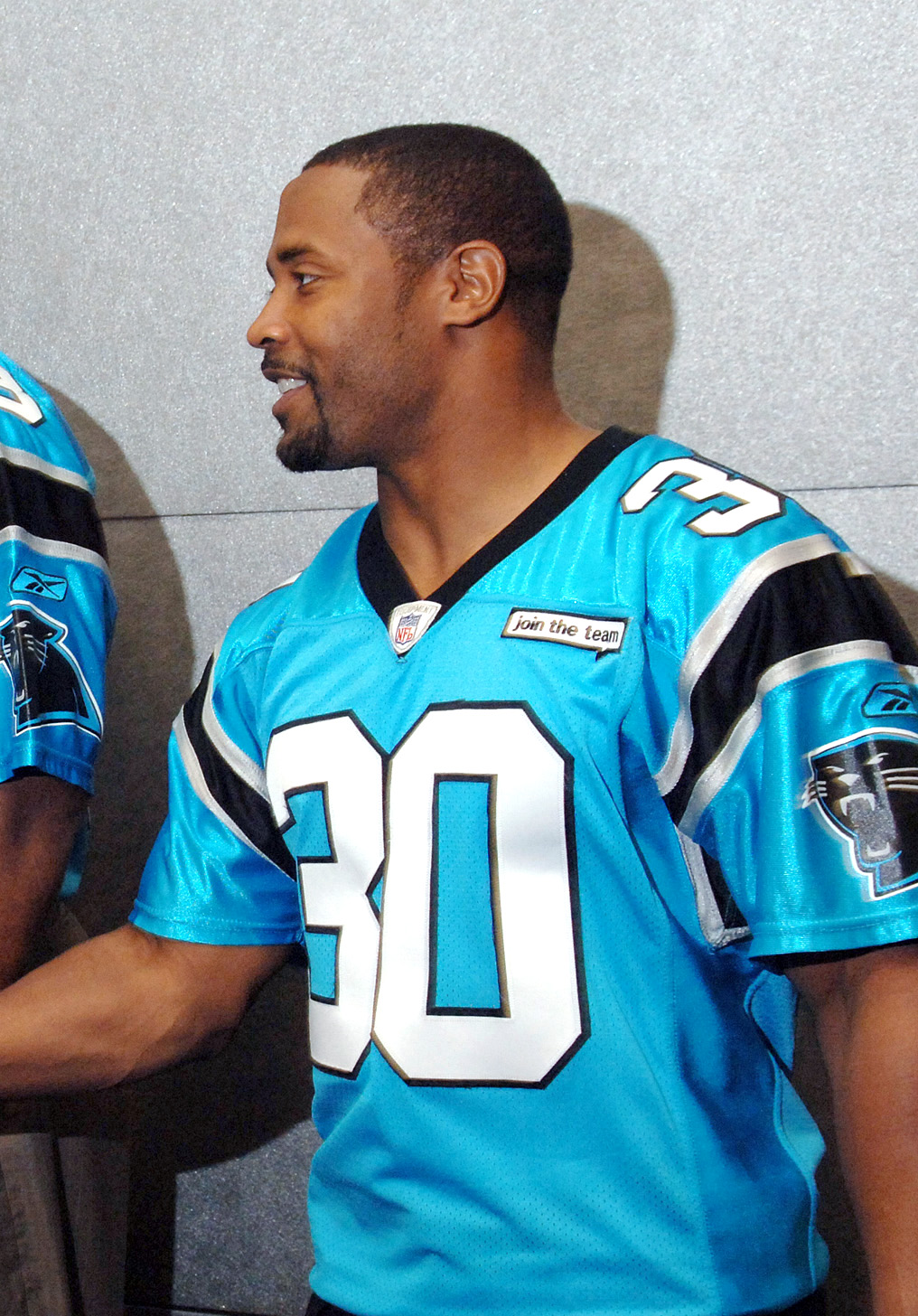
- Minter in 2006

Current position
- Title: Defensive analyst
- Team: Western Michigan
- Conference: MAC

Biographical details
- Born: January 15, 1974 (age 52); Cleveland, Ohio, U.S.

Playing career
- 1994–1996: Nebraska
- 1997–2006: Carolina Panthers
- Position: Safety

Coaching career (HC unless noted)
- 2008–2010: First Assembly Christian
- 2011: Johnson C. Smith (AHC/ST)
- 2012: Liberty (ST)
- 2013–2023: Campbell
- 2024–present: Western Michigan (DA)

Head coaching record
- Overall: 49–66

Accomplishments and honors

Championships
- 2× National (1994, 1995)

Awards
- Second-team All-Big 12 (1996); Second-team All-Big Eight (1995)

Michael Christopher Minter (born January 15, 1974) is an American college football coach and former player. He is a defensive analyst for Western Michigan University, a position he has held since 2024. He is a former head football coach at Campbell University, a position he held for eleven seasons. Minter played professionally as a safety in the National Football League (NFL) for ten seasons, from 1997 to 2006, with the Carolina Panthers. He played college football for the Nebraska Cornhuskers and was selected by the Panthers in the second round of the 1997 NFL draft.

== Early life and college ==
Minter attended Lawton High School in Lawton, Oklahoma where he started as running back and free safety. As a running back, he led the state with 1,589 yards rushing and 21 touchdowns on 187 carries as a senior. Minter also averaged 21 points per game in basketball. Minter then attended the University of Nebraska–Lincoln, where he was a member of both national championship teams of 1994 and 1995. He redshirted as a true freshman, and played backup safety his freshman year despite recording 21 tackles, two forced fumbles, and one sack. Sophomore year, Minter started the first two games of the season at free safety before tearing his left ACL, which took him out for the rest of the season. He played a key role as the starting strong safety for the 1995 national championship winning team, the first to win consensus back-to-back national championships in 40 years. He recorded 53 tackles, two interceptions, and deflected six passes. This earned him All-Big Eight second-team recognition. In his senior season, Minter started and played the first ten games at safety before moving to linebacker for the final two. He amassed 51 tackles, five interceptions, six deflected passes, and five quarterback rushes, which earned him All-Big 12 first-team honors.

== Professional career ==
Pre-draft measurables
Height	Weight	Arm length	Hand span	40-yard dash	10-yard split	20-yard split	20-yard shuttle	Three-cone drill	Vertical jump	Broad jump	Bench press
5 ft 10 1/8 in (1.78 m)	188 lb (85 kg)	31 3/8 in (0.80 m)	9 in (0.23 m)	4.50 s	1.63 s	2.66 s	4.00 s	7.23 s	36.0 in (0.91 m)	10 ft 2 in (3.10 m)	11 reps

The Carolina Panthers selected Minter in the second round (56th overall) of the 1997 NFL draft. Minter was the third safety drafted in 1997.

He became the starter in the team's sixth game of his rookie season, and remained there until his retirement. In his rookie year he posted 11 starts and finished second among defensive backs with 83 tackles, and also recorded 3.5 sacks, two fumble recoveries, two forced fumbles, 10 passes defensed and four quarterback hurries. In 1998, Minter missed ten games because of a staph infection that developed as a complication of surgery on his left knee. Following that season, Minter started every game of each year, except in 2001, when he missed the first two games because of an injury. In Carolina's appearance in the Super Bowl against the New England Patriots in 2003, Minter ranked second on defense and equaled a career-high of 18 tackles. Despite breaking his left foot in the third quarter, he stayed in the rest of the game.

In his 10 years in the NFL, all with the Panthers, Minter made 790 tackles, 9.5 sacks, 15 forced fumbles, 8 fumble recoveries, 15 interceptions, a franchise-record 421 return yards, and 4 defensive touchdowns, including a franchise-record-tying 2 in 2003.

On March 27, 2007, the NFL Network reported that the 2007 season would be Minter's last. ESPN.com reported that Minter retired after 10 seasons.

On August 7, 2007, Minter announced his retirement, effective immediately (as reported in The Charlotte Observer). His decision to retire early was attributed to continuing problems with his knees. Minter retired with team records for game starts (141) and consecutive starts (94), as well as for fumble recoveries and interceptions resulting in touchdowns.

=== NFL career statistics ===
Year	Team	Games		Tackles				Interceptions						Fumbles			
Year	Team	GP	GS	Cmb	Solo	Ast	Sck	PD	Int	Yds	Avg	Lng	TD	FF	FR	Yds	TD
1997	CAR	16	11	69	53	16	3.5	0	0	0	0.0	0	0	1	2	0	0
1998	CAR	6	4	26	19	7	0.0	0	1	7	7.0	7	0	0	0	0	0
1999	CAR	16	16	95	74	21	1.0	11	3	69	23.0	44	0	2	2	30	0
2000	CAR	16	16	125	91	34	2.0	7	2	38	19.0	30	1	3	1	0	0
2001	CAR	14	14	79	65	14	0.0	10	2	32	16.0	30	0	1	2	0	0
2002	CAR	16	16	85	66	19	1.0	9	4	125	31.3	62	1	0	1	0	0
2003	CAR	16	16	97	77	20	0.0	8	3	100	33.3	35	2	0	0	0	0
2004	CAR	16	16	83	63	20	2.0	10	0	0	0.0	0	0	3	2	0	0
2005	CAR	16	16	63	41	22	1.5	9	1	47	47.0	47	0	1	0	0	0
2006	CAR	16	16	83	59	24	0.0	5	1	3	3.0	3	0	0	1	0	0
Career		148	141	805	608	197	11.0	69	17	421	24.76	62	4	11	11	30	0

== After the NFL ==
Minter declared in 2009 that he was considering a run for the United States House of Representatives in 2010 as a Republican against incumbent Larry Kissell; however, he decided against running.

Minter had shown interest in being the first head coach of the Charlotte 49ers football team, which began play in 2013. The position, however, went to Brad Lambert, who previously served as an assistant coach at Oklahoma, Marshall, and Georgia. After spending one season as an assistant coach at Johnson C. Smith University in 2011, Minter was hired to serve as the special teams coach at Liberty University in January 2012. On November 26, 2012, Minter became the head football coach at Campbell University in Buies Creek, North Carolina.

Minter also coached three seasons at First Assembly Christian School in Concord, North Carolina, where he won two state championships.

== Head coaching record ==
=== College ===
Year	Team	Overall	Conference	Standing	Bowl/playoffs
Campbell Fighting Camels (Pioneer Football League) (2013–2017)
2013	Campbell	3–9	2–6	8th	
2014	Campbell	5–7	4–4	T–5th	
2015	Campbell	5–6	3–5	7th	
2016	Campbell	5–5	3–4	6th	
2017	Campbell	6–5	5–3	T–3rd	
Campbell Fighting Camels (Big South Conference) (2018–2019)
2018	Campbell	6–5	1–4	5th	
2019	Campbell	6–5	3–3	4th	
Campbell Fighting Camels (NCAA Division I FCS independent) (2020)
2020–21	Campbell	0–4 (Note: Campbell opted to play non-conference games in the fall as an independent, and declined to play in the spring season as a part of the Big South conference season.)			
Campbell Fighting Camels (Big South Conference) (2021–2022)
2021	Campbell	3–8	2–5	T–8th	
2022	Campbell	5–6	2–3	T–3rd	
Campbell Fighting Camels (Coastal Athletic Association Football Conference) (2023)
2023	Campbell	5–6	4–4	T–6th	
Campbell:		49–66	29–41		
Total:		49–66			
