= Rashard Anderson =

American gridiron football player (1977–2022)

No. 46
- Position: Cornerback

Personal information
- Born: June 14, 1977; Forest, Mississippi, U.S.
- Died: July 13, 2022 (aged 45)
- Listed height: 6 ft 2 in (1.88 m)
- Listed weight: 204 lb (93 kg)

Career information
- High school: Forest (MS)
- College: Jackson State (1996–1999)
- NFL draft: 2000: 1st round, 23rd overall pick

Career history
- Carolina Panthers (2000–2004); Calgary Stampeders (2005)*
- * Offseason or practice squad member only

Career NFL statistics
- Total tackles: 75
- Forced fumbles: 1
- Fumble recoveries: 3
- Pass deflections: 6
- Interceptions: 1
- Defensive touchdowns: 1
- Stats at Pro Football Reference

Rashard T. Anderson (June 14, 1977 – July 13, 2022) was an American professional football player who was a cornerback for two seasons in the National Football League (NFL). He played for the Carolina Panthers from 2000 to 2001. He played college football for the Jackson State Tigers.

== Early life ==
Anderson was born in Forest, Mississippi, on June 14, 1977. He attended Forest High School in his hometown. He then studied at Jackson State University (JSU), where he played cornerback for the Tigers from 1996 to 1999. He played a role in the Tigers winning the 1996 Southwestern Athletic Conference (SWAC) Championship and the 1999 SWAC Eastern Division title. He was subsequently drafted by the Carolina Panthers in the first round (23rd overall selection) of the 2000 NFL draft. He and Sylvester Morris were the second pair from JSU to be selected in the first round of an NFL draft, after Walter Payton and Robert Brazile in 1975.

== Professional career ==
Pre-draft measurables
Height	Weight	Arm length	Hand span	40-yard dash	10-yard split	20-yard split	20-yard shuttle	Three-cone drill	Vertical jump	Broad jump
6 ft 2 3/8 in (1.89 m)	206 lb (93 kg)	33 in (0.84 m)	10 in (0.25 m)	4.61 s	1.58 s	2.68 s	4.15 s	7.18 s	34.0 in (0.86 m)	10 ft 3 in (3.12 m)
All values from NFL Combine

Anderson was drafted in the first round of the 2000 NFL Draft. Anderson made his NFL debut with the Panthers on September 3, 2000, at the age of 23, in a 20–17 loss against the Washington Redskins. In his first NFL season, Anderson appeared in 12 games and recorded 21 tackles. He ended the 2001 season with 47 tackles and his only career interception in 15 games. He also finished second in the NFL in fumble return yards (97) after Brian Urlacher and was tied for the most fumble return touchdowns (1).

Anderson was suspended for a year by the NFL on May 23, 2002, for violating the league's substance abuse policy. The suspension was extended for the 2003 season after he failed to meet the requirements for reinstatement. He was ultimately reinstated by the NFL following the 2003 season, and the Panthers immediately released him. Anderson subsequently signed a contract with the Calgary Stampeders of the Canadian Football League in May 2005. However, he was released the following month when the Stampeders cut their roster to the 40-player regular-season limit.

== NFL career statistics ==
Legend
	Led the league
**Bold**	Career high

Year	Team	Games		Tackles					Interceptions					Fumbles			
Year	Team	GP	GS	Cmb	Solo	Ast	Sck	TFL	Int	Yds	TD	Lng	PD	FF	FR	Yds	TD
2000	CAR	12	0	23	21	2	0.0	0	0	0	0	0	1	0	0	0	0
2001	CAR	**15**	**9**	**52**	**47**	**5**	0.0	**1**	**1**	0	0	0	**5**	**1**	**3**	**97**	**1**
Career		27	9	75	68	7	0.0	1	1	0	0	0	6	1	3	97	1

== Later life ==
After retiring from professional football, Anderson was employed as a substitute teacher and was an assistant football coach at Callaway High School and Murrah High School in Jackson. He was inducted into the JSU Sports Hall of Fame.

Anderson died from pancreatic cancer on July 13, 2022, at the age of 45.
