= Louis Williams (American football) =

American football player (born 1979)

No. 66
- Position: Center

Personal information
- Born: April 11, 1979 (age 47); Fort Walton Beach, Florida, U.S.
- Listed height: 6 ft 4 in (1.93 m)
- Listed weight: 291 lb (132 kg)

Career information
- High school: Choctawhatchee (Fort Walton Beach)
- College: LSU
- NFL draft: 2001: 7th round, 211th overall pick

Career history
- Carolina Panthers (2001–2003)

Awards and highlights
- First-team All-SEC (2000)
- Stats at Pro Football Reference

Louis Randall Williams Jr. (born April 11, 1979) is an American former professional football player who was a center for two seasons with the Carolina Panthers of the National Football League (NFL). He played in two games in the 2002 season for the team.

Williams attended Louisiana State University, where he played college football for the LSU Tigers. He was selected to the Associated Press All-Southeastern Conference first-team in 2000. He was born in Fort Walton Beach, Florida and attended Choctawhatchee High School.
