= Casey Crawford (American football) =

American football player (born 1977)

No. 84, 89
- Position: Tight end

Personal information
- Born: August 1, 1977 (age 49); Washington, D.C., U.S.
- Listed height: 6 ft 6 in (1.98 m)
- Listed weight: 255 lb (116 kg)

Career information
- High school: Bishop Denis J. O'Connell (Arlington, Virginia)
- College: Virginia
- NFL draft: 2000: undrafted

Career history
- Carolina Panthers (2000–2001); Tampa Bay Buccaneers (2002)

Awards and highlights
- Super Bowl champion (XXXVII); First-team All-ACC (1998)

Career NFL statistics
- Receptions: 5
- Receiving yards: 57
- Receiving TDs: 1
- Stats at Pro Football Reference

Casey Stuart Crawford (born August 1, 1977) is an American former professional football player who was a tight end for three seasons in the National Football League (NFL) with the Carolina Panthers and Tampa Bay Buccaneers. He played college football for the Virginia Cavaliers. He was a member of the Buccaneers team that won Super Bowl XXXVII.

== Early life ==
Crawford attended Bishop Denis J. O'Connell High School in Arlington County, Virginia.

== Professional career ==
Crawford was rated the 11th best tight end in the 2000 NFL draft by NFLDraftScout.com. The website also projected that he would be selected in the sixth or seventh round of the Draft.

Crawford played from 2000 to 2001 with the Carolina Panthers of the NFL. He appeared in eleven games for the Panthers, starting one. He recorded five receptions and one receiving touchdown. Crawford was released by the Panthers on September 1, 2002.

On September 10, 2002, he was signed to the practice squad of the NFL's Tampa Bay Buccaneers. He appeared in four games for the Buccaneers. The Buccaneers won Super Bowl XXXVII 48–21 against the Oakland Raiders on January 26, 2003. Crawford retired in March 2003.

== Personal life and business career ==
Crawford founded the mortgage company Movement Mortgage in 2008 and led its growth to approximately $13 billion in originations by 2017. He publishes a personal website with thought leadership videos and business updates at CaseyCrawford.com. He was named a regional finalist for the Ernst & Young Entrepreneur of the Year Award in 2015. In April 2016, he appeared on the CNBC news and talk show Squawk Box. Crawford is also an active role model for post-professional football business success for the NFL Player Engagement organization. In 2018, Crawford was named the John Maxwell Transformational Leader Award recipient. He is a Christian and has devoted a portion of the profits from his business to a nonprofit foundation that funds community centers and charter schools in economically underserved areas. He lives in Charlotte, North Carolina with his wife, Michelle, and their two daughters. Crawford is an active philanthropist and enjoys Brazilian jiu-jitsu, CrossFit and hunting.
