= Scott O'Brien =

American football player and coach (born 1957)

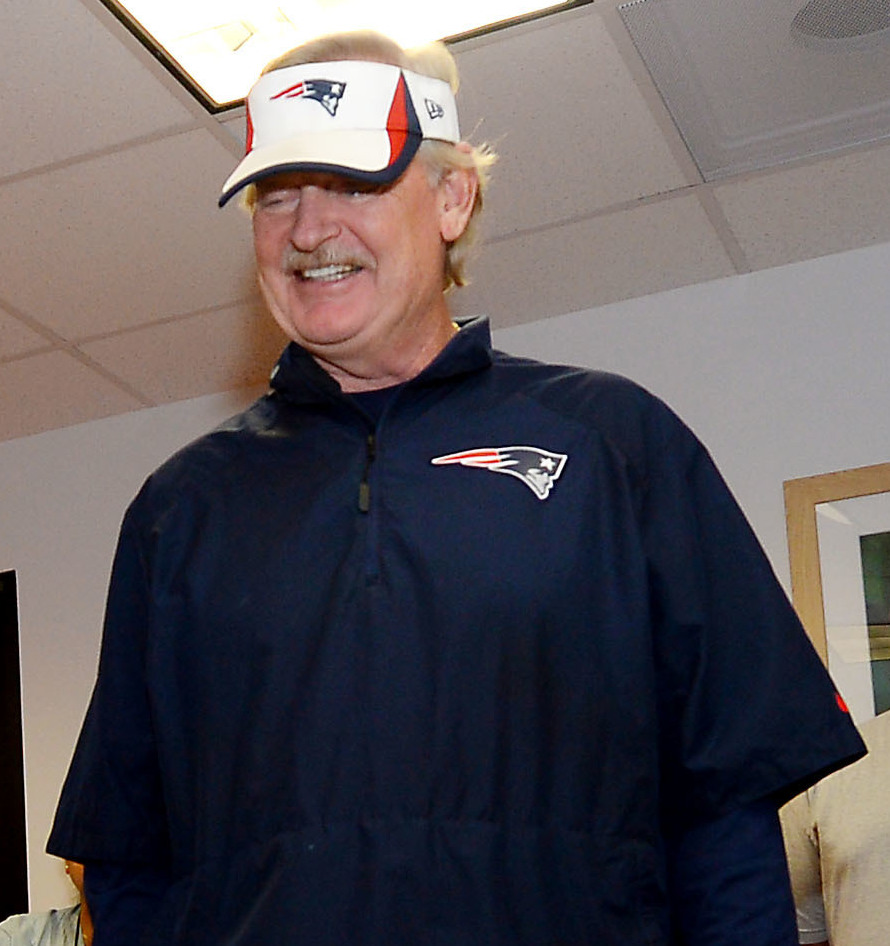
- O'Brien at Naval Medical Center San Diego in 2014

New England Patriots
- Title: Area scout

Personal information
- Born: June 25, 1957 (age 69); Superior, Wisconsin, U.S.

Career information
- College: Wisconsin–Superior
- NFL draft: 1979: undrafted

Career history

Playing
- Green Bay Packers (1979)*; Toronto Argonauts (1980)
- * Offseason or practice squad member only

Coaching
- Wisconsin–Superior (1980–1982) Assistant coach; Nevada (1983–1985) Linebackers coach & special teams coach; Rice (1986) Linebackers coach & special teams coach; Pittsburgh (1987–1990) Special teams coach; Cleveland Browns (1991–1995) Special teams coach; Baltimore Ravens (1996–1998) Special teams coach; Carolina Panthers (1999–2004) Assistant head coach & special teams coach; Denver Broncos (2007–2008) Special teams coach; New England Patriots (2009–2014) Special teams coach

Operations
- Miami Dolphins (2005–2006) Coordinator of football operations & assistant to head coach; New England Patriots (2015–present) Area scout

Awards and highlights
- 3× Super Bowl champion (XLIX, LI, LIII)

Scott O'Brien (born June 25, 1957) is an American football coach and former player who is currently serving as an area scout for the New England Patriots of the National Football League (NFL). A former defensive end/linebacker, O'Brien served as a special teams coach for three college football teams and for five NFL franchises during a 35-year long coaching career. In 2015, O'Brien retired from coaching and began his current role as an area scout.

== Playing career ==
O'Brien attended the University of Wisconsin–Superior where he played linebacker from 1975 through 1978. He signed with the Green Bay Packers in 1979 as a defensive end and also played in the Canadian Football League for the Toronto Argonauts in 1980.

== Coaching career ==
=== College ===
O'Brien began his coaching career with his alma mater, Wisconsin–Superior, as an assistant coach from 1980 through 1982. In 1983, he moved to the University of Nevada, Las Vegas, where he served as UNLV's linebackers and special teams coach from 1983 through 1985. He then spent a season in the same capacity at Rice University before becoming the University of Pittsburgh's special teams coach in 1987. He held that position through 1990, when he moved to the NFL coaching ranks.

=== NFL ===
In 1991, O'Brien was hired by then-Cleveland Browns head coach Bill Belichick as the Browns' special teams coach, winning the NFL Special Teams Coach of the Year Award in 1994. He stayed with the franchise even after Belichick's departure and the team's move to Baltimore as the Baltimore Ravens following the 1995 season. O'Brien was the Ravens' special teams coach through the 1998 season before he joined the Carolina Panthers as their assistant head coach and special teams coach in 1999. He left the Panthers after the 2004 season to join then-Miami Dolphins head coach Nick Saban as Saban's coordinator of football operations and assistant to the head coach in Saban's two seasons in Miami in the 2005–06 and 2006–07 seasons. O'Brien then joined the Denver Broncos as their special teams coach in 2007, leaving after the 2008 season to serve the New England Patriots in the same capacity, re-joining Belichick.

On February 3, 2015, two days after O'Brien's special teams unit helped the New England Patriots win Super Bowl XLIX, the Patriots announced that O'Brien would retire from coaching after 24 seasons in the NFL. However, O'Brien was kept on Belichick's staff, moving to the scouting department in his new role as an area scout for the club. O'Brien was a member of the staff when the Patriots defeated the Atlanta Falcons in Super Bowl LI. O'Brien earned his third Super Bowl title when the Patriots defeated the Los Angeles Rams in Super Bowl LIII.
