= Lester Towns =

American football player and coach (born 1977)

Los Angeles Valley Monarchs
- Title: Head coach

Personal information
- Born: August 28, 1977 (age 49); Los Angeles, California, U.S.

Career information
- High school: Pasadena (Pasadena, California)
- College: Washington
- NFL draft: 2000: 7th round, 221st overall pick

Career history

Playing
- Carolina Panthers (2000–2003); Arizona Cardinals (2005); Miami Dolphins (2005)

Coaching
- Alabama (2008–2011) Assistant strength coach, defensive assistant; Portland State (2012–2015) Linebackers coach, recruiting coordinators; Glendale (CA) (2016–2018) Assistant head coach, defensive coordinator; Los Angeles Valley (2019–present) Head coach

Career NFL statistics
- Tackles: 234
- Interceptions: 1
- Games played: 61
- Stats at Pro Football Reference

Lester Towns (born August 28, 1977) is an American football coach and former player. He is the head football coach at Los Angeles Valley College (LAVC), a position he has held since 2019. Towns played professionally as a linebacker in the National Football League (NFL) for the Carolina Panthers, Arizona Cardinals and Miami Dolphins. He graduated from Pasadena High School in Pasadena, California in 1995, and subsequently played college football at the University of Washington. Towns was selected by the Panthers in the seventh round of 2000 NFL draft.

== Head coaching record ==
Year	Team	Overall	Conference	Standing	Bowl/playoffs
Los Angeles Valley Monarchs (American Metro League) (2019–2020)
2019	Los Angeles Valley	3–6	2–4	T–4th	
2020–21	No team—COVID-19				
Los Angeles Valley Monarchs (American Pacific League) (2021–2024)
2021	Los Angeles Valley	3–7	2–3	4th	
2022	Los Angeles Valley	3–7	2–3	4th	
2023	Los Angeles Valley	4–6	1–4	5th	
2024	Los Angeles Valley	4–6	2–3	T–4th	
Los Angeles Valley Monarchs (American Metro League) (2025–present)
2025	Los Angeles Valley	3–7	2–3	4th	
Los Angeles Valley:		20–39	11–20		
Total:		20–39			
