= Jeno James =

American football player (born 1977)

No. 78
- Position: Offensive guard

Personal information
- Born: January 12, 1977 (age 49); Montgomery, Alabama, U.S.
- Listed height: 6 ft 4 in (1.93 m)
- Listed weight: 320 lb (145 kg)

Career information
- High school: Sidney Lanier (AL)
- College: Auburn
- NFL draft: 2000: 6th round, 182nd overall pick

Career history
- Carolina Panthers (2000–2003); Miami Dolphins (2004–2006)

Awards and highlights
- 2× Second-team All-SEC (1997, 1999)

Career NFL statistics
- Games played: 94
- Games started: 67
- Stats at Pro Football Reference

Jenorris "Jeno" James (born January 12, 1977) is an American former professional football player who was an offensive guard in the National Football League (NFL). He played college football at Auburn University.

== Early life ==
James started on both the offensive and defensive lines for three seasons at Sidney Lanier High School in Montgomery, Alabama. As a senior, was an all-state selection as an offensive lineman.

== College career ==
James started all 47 games for the Auburn Tigers over his four-year career (1996–99), including the final three seasons at left tackle. As a redshirt freshman in 1996, he split time between left and right tackle. As a sophomore, he was a second-team All-Southeastern Conference pick by the coaches. He received the team's attitude and effort award in his junior campaign of 1998.

== Professional career ==
=== Carolina Panthers ===
James was selected by the Carolina Panthers in the sixth round (182nd overall) of the 2000 NFL draft. He played in all 16 games in his rookie season, including four starts at left tackle. He entered a game against the San Francisco 49ers on October 22 at left tackle in place of the injured Clarence Jones. James' first NFL start came at left tackle in a Sunday night contest at the St. Louis Rams on November 5, marking the first of four straight starts at that spot.

In 2001, James was moved to the offensive guard spot after spending his rookie season at offensive tackle. He saw action in 14 games, starting six of them, including five at right guard and one at left guard. He was inactive for a pair of contests. His first start of the season came at left guard at the San Francisco 49ers on October 7. He opened at right guard each of the final five games of the year.

James played in nine games during the 2002 season, including two starts at left guard. He was inactive for seven contests. He started the season opener against the Baltimore Ravens on September 8, and a game at the Atlanta Falcons on October 20.

James, and the Panthers as a whole, experienced a breakout season in 2003. He started all 16 regular season games and all four post-season contests at left guard for the NFC Champion Panthers. James was part of a line that led a running game which finished seventh in the NFL, averaging 130.7 yards per game and 4.0 yards per rush attempt. Running back Stephen Davis finished third in the NFC in rushing with 1,444 yards. In addition, Carolina's line allowed just 27 sacks on the season - the eighth-lowest total in the NFL - and a new franchise single-season record.

=== Miami Dolphins ===
With the Panthers and James remaining far apart on contract negotiations when he was a free agent in 2004, James instead opted to sign with the Miami Dolphins. James received a five-year contract worth approximately $21.3 million from the Dolphins. James started all 14 games in which he played at left guard in his first season with the Dolphins. He was injured on November 7 when running back Sammy Morris landed on his leg. James underwent arthroscopic surgery on his right knee on November 9 and was inactive for two games as a result of the surgery.

James started all 16 games at left guard in 2005. He was part of a line that yielded just 26 sacks (the fourth-lowest total in the NFL), and led a running game that averaged 118.6 yards an outing and 4.3 yards per rush attempt, which ranked seventh and fourth in the AFC, respectively. He took part in all but one offensive snap over the course of the season, as he participated in the most snaps of any Dolphins offensive lineman in 2005.

Like many of the team's offensive linemen, James struggled some in 2006. Inconsistency and poor play at the left tackle and center positions that surround James did not help either. James started at left guard the first nine games this season, but was inactive the next five games while recovering from two subsequent arthroscopic surgeries on his right knee. James was placed on Injured Reserve on December 19, ending his season.

Though James was signed with the Dolphins through 2009, he was released at the beginning of free agency on March 2, 2007. James was due to make $2.5 million for the 2007 season.

== Personal life ==
Jeno is married and has a daughter. He majored in human development at Auburn. He enjoys reading and public speaking during his spare time.
