= John Marshall (American football) =

American football coach (1945–2021)

Personal information
- Born: October 2, 1945; Grover Beach, California, U.S.
- Died: November 2, 2021 (aged 76); Bend, Oregon, U.S.

Career information
- College: Washington State

Career history
- Allan Hancock (1967) Assistant coach; Oregon (1968–1976) Tight ends coach & offensive line coach; USC (1977–1979) Assistant coach; Green Bay Packers (1980–1982) Defensive line coach; Atlanta Falcons (1983–1985) Defensive coordinator; Indianapolis Colts (1986–1988) Defensive line coach; San Francisco 49ers (1989–1993) Defensive line coach; San Francisco 49ers (1994–1996) Linebackers coach; San Francisco 49ers (1997–1998) Defensive coordinator; Carolina Panthers (1999–2001) Defensive coordinator; Detroit Lions (2002) Linebackers coach; Seattle Seahawks (2003–2008) Defensive coordinator & linebackers coach; Oakland Raiders (2009–2010) Defensive coordinator; Virginia Destroyers (2011) Assistant coach

Awards and highlights
- 2× Super Bowl champion (XI, XXIV); UFL champion (2011)
- Coaching profile at Pro Football Reference

John Marshall (October 2, 1945 – November 2, 2021) was an American football coach. His final NFL stop was defensive coordinator for the Oakland Raiders from 2009–2010.

Marshall, a coaching veteran of over 40 years, was mostly associated with coaching linebackers. He earned two Super Bowl rings during his time with the San Francisco 49ers, where he was an assistant.

Marshall coached linebackers for the Detroit Lions in 2002, where he was on the staff of Marty Mornhinweg. Marshall had previously served as defensive coordinator under Steve Mariucci with the San Francisco 49ers in 1997 and 1998. Marshall died in 2021 at the age of 76; he had prostate cancer in his later years.
