= Karl Hankton =

American football player (born 1970)

No. 82, 14, 88
- Position: Wide receiver

Personal information
- Born: July 24, 1970 (age 56); New Orleans, Louisiana, U.S.
- Listed height: 6 ft 2 in (1.88 m)
- Listed weight: 202 lb (92 kg)

Career information
- High school: De La Salle (La.)
- College: Trinity International University

Career history
- Washington Redskins (1997); Philadelphia Eagles (1998); Carolina Panthers (2000–2006)

Career statistics
- Games played: 114
- Receptions: 20
- Receiving yards: 267
- Stats at Pro Football Reference

Karl Christopher Hankton (born July 24, 1970) is an American former professional football player who was a wide receiver in the National Football League (NFL). He attended Trinity International University. He was released by the Carolina Panthers on March 1, 2007. He is the cousin of Cortez Hankton.

== Biography ==
Hankton lettered in football, basketball, and track and field at De La Salle High School in New Orleans, Louisiana.

Hankton earned NAIA All-America and All-Mid-States Football Association recognition as a senior at Trinity College.

Hankton was a member of the Carolina special teams unit that led the NFL in opponents kickoff return average in 2002. He recorded his first career blocked punt against the Tampa Bay Buccaneers in 2004, blocking a Josh Bidwell punt. Hankton served as the Panthers special teams captain in 2002, 2003, and 2004. He also ranks as Carolina's all-time leader with 62 special teams tackles.
