= Damien Richardson (American football) =

American football player (born 1976)

No. 39
- Position: Safety

Personal information
- Born: April 3, 1976 (age 50); Los Angeles, California, U.S.
- Listed height: 6 ft 1 in (1.85 m)
- Listed weight: 210 lb (95 kg)

Career information
- High school: Clovis West (Fresno, California)
- College: Arizona State
- NFL draft: 1998: 6th round, 165th overall pick

Career history
- Carolina Panthers (1998–2004)

Awards and highlights
- Second-team All-Pac-10 (1997)

Career NFL statistics
- Tackles: 124
- Sacks: 1
- Interceptions: 1
- Stats at Pro Football Reference

Damien A. Richardson (born April 3, 1976) is an American former professional football player who spent his entire career as a safety for the Carolina Panthers of the National Football League (NFL) from 1998 to 2004. He played college football for the Arizona State Sun Devils.

While playing at Arizona State University, Richardson received a Woody Hayes National Scholar-Athlete Award. He was also honored as a National Football Foundation Hall Scholar-Athlete, and was a GTE Academic All-District VIII selection. As a senior in 1997, Richardson was a Second-team All-Pac-10 member.

Richardson was selected in the sixth round of the 1998 NFL draft. Richardson's career with the Panthers was ended by serious injuries to his neck and knee. He subsequently attended medical school at the University of California, San Francisco, completed a master's degree in public health at Harvard University, and is an orthopedic physician at Banner – University Medical Center.
