= List of Kentucky Wildcats in the NFL draft =

The University of Kentucky Wildcats football team has had 212 players drafted into the National Football League (NFL) since the league began holding drafts in 1936. Because of the NFL—AFL merger agreement, the history of the AFL is officially recognized by the NFL and therefore this list includes the AFL draft (1960–1966) and the common draft (1967–1969). This includes 17 players taken in the first round and one overall number one pick, Tim Couch in the 1999 NFL draft.

Each NFL franchise seeks to add new players through the annual NFL draft. The draft rules were last updated in 2009. The team with the worst record the previous year picks first, the next-worst team second, and so on. Teams that did not make the playoffs are ordered by their regular-season record with any remaining ties broken by strength of schedule. Playoff participants are sequenced after non-playoff teams, based on their round of elimination (wild card, division, conference, and Super Bowl). Prior to the merger agreements in 1966, the American Football League (AFL) operated in direct competition with the NFL and held a separate draft. This led to a bidding war over top prospects between the two leagues. As part of the merger agreement on June 8, 1966, the two leagues held a multiple-round "common draft". Once the AFL officially merged with the NFL in 1970, the common draft became the NFL Draft.

== Key ==
| B | Back | K | Kicker | NT | Nose tackle |
| C | Center | LB | Linebacker | FB | Fullback |
| DB | Defensive back | P | Punter | HB | Halfback |
| DE | Defensive end | QB | Quarterback | WR | Wide receiver |
| DT | Defensive tackle | RB | Running back | G | Guard |
| E | End | T | Offensive tackle | TE | Tight end |

| ^{*} | Selected to an all-star game (AFL All-Star game, NFL All-Star game or Pro Bowl) |
| ^{†} | Won a league championship (AFL championship, NFL championship, or Super Bowl) |
| ^{‡} | Inducted into Pro Football Hall of Fame |

== Selections ==
| Year | Round | Pick | Player | Team | Position | Notes |
|---|---|---|---|---|---|---|
| 1937 | 5 | 42 | Bert Johnson | Brooklyn Dodgers | RB | — |
| 1937 | 8 | 74 | Gene Myers | New York Giants | RB | — |
| 1937 | 10 | 95 | Stan Nevers | Pittsburgh Pirates | T | — |
| 1939 | 8 | 62 | Sherm Hinkebein | New York Giants | C | — |
| 1940 | 12 | 107 | Bill McCubbin | Chicago Bears | DE | — |
| 1940 | 20 | 185 | Luke Lindon | Cleveland Rams | T | — |
| 1941 | 11 | 99 | Jim Hardin | Chicago Bears | DE | — |
| 1941 | 15 | 133 | John Eibner | Pittsburgh Steelers | T | — |
| 1941 | 18 | 165 | Charlie Ishmael | Detroit Lions | RB | — |
| 1941 | 21 | 192 | Joe Bailey | Green Bay Packers | C | — |
| 1942 | 10 | 90 | Noah Mullins | Chicago Bears | RB | — |
| 1943 | 5 | 35 | Clyde Johnson | Cleveland Rams | T | — |
| 1943 | 13 | 119 | Clark Wood | Chicago Bears | T | — |
| 1944 | 13 | 127 | Charley Walker | Washington Redskins | C | — |
| 1944 | 26 | 273 | Charley Kuhn | Cleveland Rams | RB | — |
| 1944 | 26 | 274 | Bill Portwood | Boston Yanks | DE | — |
| 1945 | 9 | 78 | Gene Meeks | Chicago Cardinals | RB | — |
| 1945 | 16 | 163 | Jim Little | New York Giants | T | — |
| 1945 | 20 | 202 | Bill Griffin | Cleveland Rams | T | — |
| 1946 | 26 | 244 | Jess Tunstill | Chicago Bears | B | — |
| 1947 | 3 | 18 | Ermal Allen | Chicago Cardinals | B | — |
| 1947 | 27 | 251 | Phil Cutchin | Philadelphia Eagles | B | — |
| 1948 | 7 | 51 | Jay Rhodemyre | Green Bay Packers | C | — |
| 1949 | 7 | 69 | Wallace Jones | Chicago Bears | E | — |
| 1949 | 11 | 106 | Dick Hensley | New York Giants | E | — |
| 1949 | 12 | 119 | George Blanda*†‡ | Chicago Bears | QB | NFL MVP (1970); AFL All-Star (1961, 1962, 1963, 1967); AFL Champion (1960, 1961, 1967); Pro Football Hall of Fame (1981) |
| 1950 | 4 | 45 | Harry Ulinski* | Washington Redskins | C | Pro Bowl (1955) |
| 1950 | 5 | 65 | Don Phelps† | Cleveland Browns | B | NFL Champion (1950) |
| 1950 | 6 | 79 | Lloyd McDermott | Philadelphia Eagles | T | — |
| 1950 | 18 | 231 | Ralph Genito | San Francisco 49ers | B | — |
| 1950 | 20 | 251 | Jim Howe | Green Bay Packers | B | — |
| 1950 | 25 | 321 | Lee Truman | Chicago Cardinals | B | — |
| 1950 | 29 | 368 | Ben Zaranka | Green Bay Packers | E | |
| 1951 | 1 | 5 | Bob Gain* | Green Bay Packers | T | Pro Bowl (1957) |
| 1951 | 3 | 29 | Walt Yowarsky† | Washington Redskins | T | NFL Champion (1956) |
| 1951 | 3 | 32 | Al Bruno | Philadelphia Eagles | DE | — |
| 1951 | 11 | 130 | Bob Pope | Philadelphia Eagles | T | — |
| 1951 | 14 | 163 | Bill Leskovar | Chicago Cardinals | B | — |
| 1951 | 15 | 176 | Clay Webb | Pittsburgh Steelers | B | — |
| 1951 | 15 | 179 | Bill Wanamaker | New York Yanks | G | — |
| 1951 | 18 | 210 | Dom Fucci | Washington Redskins | B | — |
| 1951 | 28 | 331 | Dick Martin | Chicago Cardinals | B | — |
| 1952 | 1 | 4 | Babe Parilli*† | Green Bay Packers | QB | Super Bowl Champion (III); AFL Champion (1968); AFL All-Star (1963, 1964, 1966) |
| 1952 | 6 | 71 | Jim MacKenzie | New York Giants | T | — |
| 1952 | 13 | 149 | Ed Hamilton | Philadelphia Eagles | B | — |
| 1952 | 17 | 205 | John Griggs | Los Angeles Rams | C | — |
| 1952 | 26 | 313 | Frank Fuller* | Los Angeles Rams | T | Pro Bowl (1959) |
| 1952 | 28 | 326 | Doug Moseley | New York Yanks | C | — |
| 1953 | 3 | 36 | Bob Fry | Los Angeles Rams | T | — |
| 1953 | 3 | 37 | Gene Donaldson | Cleveland Browns | G | — |
| 1953 | 11 | 124 | Ralph Charney | Chicago Bears | B | — |
| 1953 | 23 | 269 | Ray Correll | Pittsburgh Steelers | G | — |
| 1953 | 29 | 344 | Ralph Paolone | Philadelphia Eagles | B | — |
| 1954 | 1 | 8 | Steve Meilinger | Washington Redskins | DE | — |
| 1954 | 17 | 197 | Tommy Adkins | Baltimore Colts | C | — |
| 1955 | 11 | 129 | Bob Hardy | Philadelphia Eagles | B | — |
| 1956 | 11 | 129 | Dick Moloney | New York Giants | B | — |
| 1956 | 15 | 180 | Dick Shatto | Los Angeles Rams | B | — |
| 1956 | 17 | 204 | Jack Butler | Los Angeles Rams | T | — |
| 1956 | 21 | 251 | Howard Schnellenberger | Washington Redskins | DE | — |
| 1956 | 25 | 293 | Bill Wheeler | Chicago Cardinals | T | — |
| 1956 | 25 | 295 | Brad Mills | Baltimore Colts | B | — |
| 1957 | 6 | 69 | J. T. Frankenberger | Cleveland Browns | B | — |
| 1957 | 17 | 200 | Dave Kuhn | San Francisco 49ers | C | — |
| 1958 | 1 | 4 | Lou Michaels | Los Angeles Rams | DT | — |
| 1958 | 29 | 349 | Henry Herzog | Detroit Lions | B | — |
| 1959 | 22 | 254 | Jim Bowie | Philadelphia Eagles | T | — |
| 1960 | 11 | 129 | Glenn Shaw | Chicago Bears | RB | — |
| 1961 | 12 | 163 | Tom Rodgers | Detroit Lions | B | — |
| 1961 | 17 | 237 | Calvin Bird | Cleveland Browns | B | — |
| 1962 | 1 | 12 | Irv Goode† | St. Louis Cardinals | C | Super Bowl Champion (VIII) |
| 1962 | 9 | 124 | Bob Butler | Philadelphia Eagles | T | — |
| 1962 | 18 | 241 | Junior Hawthorne | Minnesota Vikings | T | — |
| 1963 | 1 | 9 | Tom Hutchinson | Cleveland Browns | DE | — |
| 1964 | 2 | 24 | Herschel Turner | Cleveland Browns | DE | — |
| 1966 | 1 | 15 | Sam Ball† | Baltimore Colts | T | Super Bowl Champion (V) |
| 1966 | 2 | 26 | Bob Windsor | San Francisco 49ers | TE | — |
| 1966 | 2 | 29 | Rick Norton | Cleveland Browns | QB | — |
| 1966 | 3 | 47 | Rick Kestner | Baltimore Colts | WR | — |
| 1966 | 5 | 72 | Doug Davis | Minnesota Vikings | T | — |
| 1967 | 7 | 163 | Larry Seiple | Miami Dolphins | RB | — |
| 1967 | 11 | 185 | Pat Riley | Dallas Cowboys | WR | - |
| 1968 | 11 | 283 | Dwight Little | Detroit Lions | G | — |
| 1969 | 4 | 103 | Dickie Lyons | Atlanta Falcons | DB | — |
| 1969 | 11 | 262 | Jeff Van Note* | Atlanta Falcons | LB | Pro Bowl (1974, 1975, 1980, 1981, 1982) |
| 1970 | 10 | 252 | Dick Palmer | Baltimore Colts | LB | — |
| 1970 | 17 | 436 | Dick Beard | New York Jets | RB | — |
| 1971 | 6 | 131 | David Hardt | Boston Patriots | TE | — |
| 1971 | 13 | 330 | Dave Roller | New York Giants | DT | — |
| 1971 | 15 | 372 | Ray Maykin | Pittsburgh Steelers | G | — |
| 1971 | 16 | 414 | Dave Burcell | San Francisco 49ers | DT | — |
| 1972 | 13 | 98 | Joe Federspiel | New Orleans Saints | LB | — |
| 1972 | 7 | 163 | Bill Bushong | Green Bay Packers | DT | — |
| 1973 | 9 | 213 | Ken King | St. Louis Cardinals | LB | — |
| 1973 | 11 | 270 | Dan Neal | Baltimore Colts | C | — |
| 1974 | 4 | 89 | Frank LeMaster | Philadelphia Eagles | LB | — |
| 1974 | 14 | 346 | Cecil Bowens | New England Patriots | RB | — |
| 1974 | 16 | 396 | Dave Margavage | Baltimore Colts | T | — |
| 1974 | 16 | 410 | Darryl Bishop | Cincinnati Bengals | DB | — |
| 1975 | 2 | 34 | Elmore Stephens | Kansas City Chiefs | TE | — |
| 1975 | 5 | 126 | Rick Nuzum | Los Angeles Rams | C | — |
| 1975 | 13 | 323 | Tom Ehlers | Philadelphia Eagles | LB | — |
| 1976 | 2 | 36 | Sonny Collins | Atlanta Falcons | RB | — |
| 1976 | 5 | 151 | Wally Pesuit | Dallas Cowboys | T | — |
| 1976 | 16 | 439 | Steve Campassi | Philadelphia Eagles | RB | — |
| 1977 | 1 | 6 | Warren Bryant | Atlanta Falcons | T | — |
| 1977 | 1 | 26 | Randy Burke | Baltimore Colts | WR | — |
| 1978 | 1 | 2 | Art Still* | Kansas City Chiefs | DE | Pro Bowl (1980, 1981, 1982, 1984) |
| 1978 | 5 | 136 | Derrick Ramsey | Oakland Raiders | TE | — |
| 1978 | 9 | 244 | Mike Martin | Chicago Bears | LB | — |
| 1978 | 10 | 255 | Will Grant | Buffalo Bills | C | — |
| 1978 | 10 | 275 | Dallas Owens | Baltimore Colts | DB | — |
| 1978 | 11 | 282 | Jerry Blanton | Buffalo Bills | LB | — |
| 1979 | 3 | 70 | Jim Ramey | Cleveland Browns | DE | — |
| 1979 | 4 | 93 | Jim Kovach | New Orleans Saints | LB | — |
| 1979 | 5 | 123 | Kelly Kirchbaum | New York Jets | LB | — |
| 1979 | 7 | 181 | Bob Winkel | Minnesota Vikings | DT | — |
| 1979 | 8 | 209 | Robert Hawkins | Oakland Raiders | RB | — |
| 1979 | 10 | 256 | Dan Fowler | New York Giants | G | — |
| 1979 | 12 | 317 | David Stephens | Minnesota Vikings | LB | — |
| 1980 | 3 | 74 | Larry Carter | Denver Broncos | DB | — |
| 1980 | 6 | 150 | Lester Boyd | New Orleans Saints | LB | — |
| 1980 | 7 | 180 | Tom Kearns | New England Patriots | G | — |
| 1981 | 9 | 233 | Tim Gooch | Baltimore Colts | DT | — |
| 1982 | 11 | 287 | Jim Campbell | Houston Oilers | TE | — |
| 1984 | 6 | 141 | John Grimsley | Houston Oilers | LB | — |
| 1985 | 1 | 19 | George Adams | New York Giants | RB | — |
| 1985 | 5 | 136 | Cam Jacobs | Pittsburgh Steelers | LB | — |
| 1985 | 10 | 268 | Oliver White | Pittsburgh Steelers | TE | — |
| 1985 | 11 | 291 | Jeff Smith | San Diego Chargers | DT | — |
| 1986 | 8 | 221 | Maurice Douglass | Chicago Bears | DB | — |
| 1986 | 10 | 253 | Jon Dumbauld | New Orleans Saints | DE | — |
| 1987 | 5 | 130 | Marc Logan | Cincinnati Bengals | RB | — |
| 1987 | 5 | 137 | Tony Mayes | Tampa Bay Buccaneers | DB | — |
| 1987 | 12 | 327 | Bill Ransdell | New York Jets | QB | — |
| 1988 | 2 | 44 | Dermontti Dawson*‡ | Pittsburgh Steelers | C | Pro Bowl (1992, 1993, 1994, 1995, 1996, 1997, 1998); Pro Football Hall of Fame (2012) |
| 1988 | 5 | 128 | Jerry Reese | Pittsburgh Steelers | DE | — |
| 1988 | 8 | 205 | Mark Higgs | Dallas Cowboys | RB | — |
| 1988 | 12 | 205 | Greg Kunkel | Los Angeles Raiders | G | — |
| 1989 | 7 | 174 | D. J. Johnson | Pittsburgh Steelers | DB | — |
| 1989 | 7 | 182 | Ivy Joe Hunter | Indianapolis Colts | RB | — |
| 1989 | 8 | 222 | Chris Chenault | Cincinnati Bengals | LB | — |
| 1989 | 9 | 233 | Chris Darrington | Washington Redskins | TE | — |
| 1990 | 3 | 55 | Oliver Barnett | Atlanta Falcons | DE | — |
| 1990 | 7 | 171 | Donnie Gardner | Tampa Bay Buccaneers | DE | — |
| 1990 | 8 | 184 | Andy Murray | Houston Oilers | RB | — |
| 1991 | 5 | 261 | Al Baker | New York Jets | RB | — |
| 1991 | 12 | 323 | Jeff Brady | Pittsburgh Steelers | LB | — |
| 1993 | 4 | 85 | Dean Wells | Seattle Seahawks | LB | — |
| 1993 | 4 | 97 | Todd Perry | Chicago Bears | G | — |
| 1993 | 6 | 158 | Chuck Bradley | Houston Oilers | T | — |
| 1993 | 8 | 158 | Doug Pelfrey | Cincinnati Bengals | K | — |
| 1994 | 6 | 172 | Terry Samuels | Arizona Cardinals | TE | — |
| 1994 | 7 | 207 | Zane Beehn | San Diego Chargers | LB | — |
| 1994 | 7 | 222 | Marty Moore | New England Patriots | LB | — |
| 1995 | 2 | 43 | Melvin Johnson | Tampa Bay Buccaneers | DB | — |
| 1996 | 3 | 75 | Moe Williams | Minnesota Vikings | RB | — |
| 1996 | 7 | 221 | Reggie Rusk | Tampa Bay Buccaneers | DB | — |
| 1997 | 5 | 141 | Van Hiles | Chicago Bears | DB | — |
| 1997 | 7 | 205 | Chris Ward | Baltimore Ravens | DE | — |
| 1998 | 7 | 234 | Kio Sanford | San Diego Chargers | WR | — |
| 1999 | 1 | 1 | Tim Couch | Cleveland Browns | QB | — |
| 1999 | 4 | 98 | Craig Yeast | Cincinnati Bengals | WR | — |
| 2000 | 5 | 157 | James Whalen | Tampa Bay Buccaneers | TE | — |
| 2001 | 3 | 69 | Eric Kelly | Minnesota Vikings | DB | — |
| 2001 | 7 | 233 | Marlon McCree | Jacksonville Jaguars | DB | — |
| 2001 | 7 | 236 | Quentin McCord | Atlanta Falcons | WR | — |
| 2002 | 3 | 98 | Dennis Johnson | Arizona Cardinals | DE | — |
| 2003 | 1 | 4 | Dewayne Robertson | New York Jets | DT | — |
| 2003 | 4 | 99 | Artose Pinner | Detroit Lions | RB | — |
| 2004 | 7 | 244 | Derek Abney | Baltimore Ravens | WR | — |
| 2005 | 3 | 92 | Vincent Burns | Indianapolis Colts | DE | — |
| 2008 | 4 | 127 | Jacob Tamme | Indianapolis Colts | TE | — |
| 2008 | 4 | 128 | Keenan Burton | St. Louis Rams | WR | — |
| 2008 | 6 | 198 | Andre' Woodson | New York Giants | QB | — |
| 2008 | 7 | 224 | Stevie Johnson | Buffalo Bills | WR | — |
| 2009 | 6 | 207 | Myron Pryor | New England Patriots | DT | — |
| 2010 | 3 | 83 | Corey Peters | Atlanta Falcons | DT | — |
| 2010 | 4 | 105 | Trevard Lindley | Philadelphia Eagles | DB | — |
| 2010 | 5 | 139 | John Conner | New York Jets | FB | — |
| 2011 | 2 | 64 | Randall Cobb* | Green Bay Packers | WR | Pro Bowl (2014, 2015) |
| 2012 | 6 | 181 | Winston Guy | Seattle Seahawks | DB | — |
| 2012 | 6 | 188 | Danny Trevathan† | Denver Broncos | LB | Super Bowl Champion (50) |
| 2013 | 3 | 65 | Larry Warford | Detroit Lions | G | Pro Bowl (2017, 2018, 2019) |
| 2014 | 5 | 151 | Avery Williamson | Tennessee Titans | LB | — |
| 2015 | 1 | 22 | Bud Dupree | Pittsburgh Steelers | LB | — |
| 2015 | 4 | 122 | Za'Darius Smith | Baltimore Ravens | DE | Pro Bowl (2019, 2020) |
| 2016 | 6 | 190 | Josh Forrest | Los Angeles Rams | LB | — |
| 2019 | 1 | 7 | Josh Allen | Jacksonville Jaguars | LB | Pro Bowl (2019, 2023) |
| 2019 | 2 | 54 | Lonnie Johnson Jr. | Houston Texans | DB | — |
| 2019 | 3 | 99 | Mike Edwards | Tampa Bay Buccaneers | DB | Super Bowl Champion (LV) |
| 2019 | 4 | 122 | Benny Snell | Pittsburgh Steelers | RB | — |
| 2019 | 7 | 232 | George Asafo-Adjei | New York Giants | T | — |
| 2020 | 3 | 80 | Lynn Bowden | Las Vegas Raiders | WR | — |
| 2020 | 4 | 121 | Logan Stenberg | Detroit Lions | G | — |
| 2021 | 1 | 19 | Jamin Davis | Washington Football Team | LB | — |
| 2021 | 2 | 44 | Kelvin Joseph | Dallas Cowboys | DB | — |
| 2021 | 6 | 192 | Quinton Bohanna | Dallas Cowboys | DT | — |
| 2021 | 6 | 200 | Brandin Echols | New York Jets | DB | — |
| 2021 | 6 | 206 | Landon Young | New Orleans Saints | T | — |
| 2021 | 7 | 232 | Phil Hoskins | Carolina Panthers | DT | — |
| 2022 | 2 | 43 | Wan'Dale Robinson | New York Giants | WR | — |
| 2022 | 2 | 46 | Josh Paschal | Detroit Lions | DE | — |
| 2022 | 3 | 65 | Luke Fortner | Jacksonville Jaguars | C | — |
| 2022 | 5 | 145 | Darian Kinnard | Kansas City Chiefs | T | — |
| 2023 | 2 | 33 | Will Levis | Tennessee Titans | QB | — |
| 2023 | 6 | 193 | Chris Rodriguez Jr. | Washington Commanders | RB | — |
| 2023 | 7 | 232 | Carrington Valentine | Green Bay Packers | DB | — |
| 2024 | 3 | 70 | Andru Phillips | New York Giants | DB | — |
| 2024 | 3 | 72 | Trevin Wallace | Carolina Panthers | LB | — |
| 2024 | 4 | 128 | Ray Davis | Buffalo Bills | RB | — |
| 2024 | 6 | 218 | Devin Leary | Baltimore Ravens | QB | — |
| 2025 | 1 | 30 | Maxwell Hairston | Buffalo Bills | DB | — |
| 2025 | 4 | 109 | Deone Walker | Buffalo Bills | DT | — |
| 2026 | 4 | 113 | Jalen Farmer | Indianapolis Colts | G | — |
| 2026 | 5 | 153 | Jager Burton | Green Bay Packers | C | — |
| 2026 | 5 | 168 | Kendrick Law | Detroit Lions | WR | — |
| 2026 | 7 | 237 | Seth McGowan | Indianapolis Colts | RB | — |

== Supplemental Draft ==
| Year | Round | Pick | Player | Team | Position | Notes |
| 1979 | 6 | 0 | Rod Stewart | Buffalo Bills | RB | — |

== Notable undrafted players ==
Note: No drafts were held before 1920

| Year | Player | Position | Debut Team | Notes |
|---|---|---|---|---|
| 1970 | Cal Withrow | C | San Diego Chargers | — |
| 1974 | Doug Kotar | RB | Pittsburgh Steelers | — |
| 1979 | Thom Dornbrook | C | Pittsburgh Steelers | — |
| 1987 | Cornell Burbage | WR | Dallas Cowboys | — |
| 2002 | Chris Demaree | DT | San Diego Chargers | — |
| 2022 | Josh Ali | WR | Atlanta Falcons | — |
| 2023 | Tashawn Manning | G | Baltimore Ravens | — |
| 2023 | Keidron Smith | DB | Miami Dolphins | — |
| 2023 | DeAndre Square | LB | Los Angeles Rams | — |
| 2024 | Brenden Bates | TE | Chicago Bears | — |
| 2024 | Jeremy Flax | OT | Minnesota Vikings | — |
| 2024 | Tayvion Robinson | WR | Baltimore Ravens | — |
| 2025 | Zion Childress | S | Dallas Cowboys | — |
| 2025 | Marques Cox | OT | Denver Broncos | — |
| 2026 | Aidan Laros | P | Tampa Bay Buccaneers | — |
| 2026 | Ja'Mori Maclin | WR | Buffalo Bills | — |
