= 2018 Kentucky Wildcats football team =

American college football season

2018 Kentucky Wildcats football

Citrus Bowl champion

Citrus Bowl, W 27–24 vs. Penn State
- Conference: Southeastern Conference
- Eastern Division

Ranking
- Coaches: No. 11
- AP: No. 12
- Record: 10–3 (5–3 SEC)
- Head coach: Mark Stoops (6th season)
- Offensive coordinator: Eddie Gran (3rd season)
- Co-offensive coordinator: Darin Hinshaw (3rd season)
- Offensive scheme: Spread
- Defensive coordinator: Matt House (2nd season)
- Base defense: 3–4 or 4–3
- Home stadium: Kroger Field

2018 Southeastern Conference football standings
	Conf.			Overall
Team	W		L	W		L
Eastern Division
No. T–7 Georgia x	7	–	1	11	–	3
No. 12 Kentucky	5	–	3	10	–	3
No. T–7 Florida	5	–	3	10	–	3
South Carolina	4	–	4	7	–	6
Missouri	4	–	4	8	–	5
Vanderbilt	3	–	5	6	–	7
Tennessee	2	–	6	5	–	7
Western Division
No. 2 Alabama x$^	8	–	0	14	–	1
No. 16 Texas A&M	5	–	3	9	–	4
No. 6 LSU	5	–	3	10	–	3
Mississippi State*	4	–	4	8	–	5
Auburn	3	–	5	8	–	5
Ole Miss	1	–	7	5	–	7
Arkansas	0	–	8	2	–	10
Championship: Alabama 35, Georgia 28
^ – College Football Playoff participant; $ – Conference champion; x – Division champion/co-champions; * Mississippi State vacated four conference and eight total wins due to NCAA violations.; Rankings from AP Poll

The 2018 Kentucky Wildcats football team represented the University of Kentucky in the 2018 NCAA Division I FBS football season. The Wildcats played their home games at Kroger Field in Lexington, Kentucky and competed in the Eastern Division of the Southeastern Conference (SEC). They were led by sixth-year head coach Mark Stoops.

The season was one of the most successful in Kentucky's history. In Kentucky's second game of the season, the team ended the then-longest current losing streak in an uninterrupted series in FBS when they defeated Florida for the first time since 1986, and the first time in Gainesville since 1979, ending a losing streak of 31 games. Two weeks later, the Wildcats upset No. 14 Mississippi State, and entered the AP Poll for the first time since 2007. Kentucky ended the regular season tied for second in the SEC East Division with a conference record of 5–3. They were invited to the Citrus Bowl, where they defeated No. 13 Penn State, their first bowl win since 2008. Kentucky ended the season with a record of 10–3 and were ranked 12th in the final AP Poll, the most wins and highest poll finish for the program since 1977.

The team's highly touted defense was anchored by unanimous All-American linebacker Josh Allen, who was named SEC Defensive Player of the Year and led the conference in sacks and tackles for loss. Allen won several national awards for defensive excellence, including the Bronko Nagurski Trophy, Chuck Bednarik Award, and the Lott Trophy; he became the first Kentucky player to receive any of these awards. On offense, the team was led by first-team All-SEC running back Benny Snell, who finished second in the conference in rushing with 1,449 yards and 16 touchdowns. Offensive lineman Bunchy Stallings was also named first-team all-conference. Quarterback Terry Wilson led the team in passing, finishing with 1,889 yards and 11 touchdowns. Head coach Mark Stoops was named SEC Coach of the Year.

== Offseason ==
=== Spring game ===
The spring game took place on April 13 at Kroger Field.

Date	Time	Spring Game	Site	TV	Result	Attendance
April 13	6:30 p.m.	Blue vs. White	Kroger Field • Lexington, KY	SECN	Blue 45, White 32	36,090

=== Departures ===
Name	Number	Pos.	Height	Weight	Year	Hometown	Notes
Drew Barker	#7	QB	6'3"	222	Junior	Orlando, FL	Retired
Stephen Johnson	#15	QB	6'2"	195	Senior	Rancho Cucamonga, California	Graduated
Blake Bone	#6	WR	6'5"	213	Senior	Woodruff, South Carolina	Graduated
Garrett Johnson	#9	WR	5'11"	175	Senior	Winter Park, Florida	Graduated
Kayaune Ross	#19	WR	6'6"	225	Senior	West Chester, Ohio	Graduated
Charles Walker	#88	WR	5'11"	203	Senior	Louisville, Kentucky	Graduated
Greg Hart	#85	TE	6'5"	245	Senior	Dayton, Ohio	Graduated
Kyle Meadows	#73	OT	6'5"	300	Senior	West Chester, Ohio	Graduated
Nick Haynes	#68	OG	6'3"	300	Senior	Niceville, Florida	Graduated
Matt Elam	#69	DT	6'7"	360	Senior	Elizabethtown, Kentucky	Graduated
Jacob Hyde	#36	DT	6'2"	320	Senior	Manchester, Kentucky	Graduated
Naquez Pringle	#77	DT	6'3"	320	Senior	Georgetown, South Carolina	Graduated
Denzil Ware	#35	DE	6'2"	240	Junior	Opp, Alabama	Transferred to Jacksonville State
Eli Brown	#32	LB	6'2"	208	Sophomore	Bowling Green, Kentucky	Transferred to Western Kentucky
Bryant Koback	#24	RB	6'0"	200	Freshman	Holland, Ohio	Transferred to Toledo
Courtney Love	#51	LB	6'2"	245	Senior	Youngstown, Ohio	Graduated
Kendall Randolph	#5	DB	6'0"	183	Senior	Tallahassee, Florida	Graduated
Marcus Walker	#16	DB	6'1"	208	Junior	Lake Wales, Florida	Kicked off team
Austin MacGinnis	#99	K	5'10"	172	Senior	Wedowee, Alabama	Graduated

=== 2018 signing class ===
The 2018 football recruiting cycle was the first in which the NCAA authorized two signing periods for high school seniors in that sport. In addition to the traditional spring period starting with National Signing Day on February 7, 2018, a new early signing period was introduced, with the first such period falling from December 20–22, 2017.

Notably, the Wildcats did not sign a single in-state player in their 2018 class—the first time this had happened since 1940.

College recruiting information (2018)
Name	Hometown	School	Height	Weight	Commit date
Marvin Alexander #110 WR	Hollywood, FL	Chaminade-Madonna Prep	6 ft 3 in (1.91 m)	175 lb (79 kg)	Feb 21, 2017
Marvin Alexander #110 WR	Recruit ratings: Scout: Rivals: 247Sports: ESPN:				
Brenden Bates #25 TE	Cincinnati, OH	Moeller High School	6 ft 5 in (1.96 m)	230 lb (100 kg)	Mar 10, 2017
Brenden Bates #25 TE	Recruit ratings: Scout: Rivals: 247Sports: ESPN:				
Jamari Brown #74 CB	Pompano Beach, FL	Blanche Ely High School	6 ft 3 in (1.91 m)	180 lb (82 kg)	Aug 17, 2017
Jamari Brown #74 CB	Recruit ratings: Scout: Rivals: 247Sports: ESPN:				
Allen Dailey #111 WR	Pinson, AL	Pinson Valley High School	6 ft 3 in (1.91 m)	195 lb (88 kg)	Jan 21, 2018
Allen Dailey #111 WR	Recruit ratings: Scout: Rivals: 247Sports: ESPN:				
Stanley Garner #46 DB	Fort Lauderdale, FL	Dillard High School	6 ft 3 in (1.91 m)	180 lb (82 kg)	Aug 16, 2017
Stanley Garner #46 DB	Recruit ratings: Scout: Rivals: 247Sports: ESPN:				
Davoan Hawkins #37 DE	Hollywood, FL	Chaminade-Madonna Prep	6 ft 4 in (1.93 m)	270 lb (120 kg)	Feb 21, 2017
Davoan Hawkins #37 DE	Recruit ratings: Scout: Rivals: 247Sports: ESPN:				
Akeem Hayes #82 ATH	Hollywood, FL	Chaminade-Madonna Prep	5 ft 10 in (1.78 m)	175 lb (79 kg)	Jun 20, 2017
Akeem Hayes #82 ATH	Recruit ratings: Scout: Rivals: 247Sports: ESPN:				
Kenneth Horsey #53 OG	Sanford, FL	Seminole High School	6 ft 3 in (1.91 m)	326 lb (148 kg)	Dec 12, 2017
Kenneth Horsey #53 OG	Recruit ratings: Scout: Rivals: 247Sports: ESPN:				
Darian Kinnard #22 OT	Cleveland, OH	St. Ignatius High School	6 ft 1 in (1.85 m)	185 lb (84 kg)	Apr 30, 2017
Darian Kinnard #22 OT	Recruit ratings: Scout: Rivals: 247Sports: ESPN:				
Nick Lewis #70 OT	Jacksonville, FL	Bolles School	6 ft 9 in (2.06 m)	350 lb (160 kg)	Jan 22, 2018
Nick Lewis #70 OT	Recruit ratings: Scout: Rivals: 247Sports: ESPN:				
Jerquavion Mahone #69 DT	Manchester, GA	Manchester High School	6 ft 3 in (1.91 m)	299 lb (136 kg)	Dec 12, 2017
Jerquavion Mahone #69 DT	Recruit ratings: Scout: Rivals: 247Sports: ESPN:				
Marquan McCall #6 OG	Oak Park, MI	Oak Park	6 ft 4 in (1.93 m)	320 lb (150 kg)	May 8, 2017
Marquan McCall #6 OG	Recruit ratings: Scout: Rivals: 247Sports: ESPN:				
Christopher Oats #22 LB	Cincinnati, OH	Winton Woods High School	6 ft 4 in (1.93 m)	215 lb (98 kg)	Feb 7, 2017
Christopher Oats #22 LB	Recruit ratings: Scout: Rivals: 247Sports: ESPN:				
Bryce Oliver #162 WR	Fort Lauderdale, FL	Dillard High School	6 ft 3 in (1.91 m)	205 lb (93 kg)	Dec 20, 2017
Bryce Oliver #162 WR	Recruit ratings: Scout: Rivals: 247Sports: ESPN:				
Chris Rodriguez Jr. #64 RB	McDonough, Georgia	Ola High School	5 ft 11 in (1.80 m)	200 lb (91 kg)	Jul 30, 2017
Chris Rodriguez Jr. #64 RB	Recruit ratings: Scout: Rivals: 247Sports: ESPN:				
Kavosiey Smoke #55 RB	Wetumpka, AL	Wetumpka High School	6 ft 0 in (1.83 m)	215 lb (98 kg)	Feb 7, 2018
Kavosiey Smoke #55 RB	Recruit ratings: Scout: Rivals: 247Sports: ESPN:				
DeAndre Square #37 S	Detroit, MI	Cass Technical High School	6 ft 1 in (1.85 m)	200 lb (91 kg)	Jun 16, 2017
DeAndre Square #37 S	Recruit ratings: Scout: Rivals: 247Sports: ESPN:				
Keaton Upshaw #34 TE	Lima, OH	Lima Senior High School	6 ft 7 in (2.01 m)	225 lb (102 kg)	Jul 1, 2017
Keaton Upshaw #34 TE	Recruit ratings: Scout: Rivals: 247Sports: ESPN:				
Terry Wilson #3 QB (JUCO)	Oklahoma City, OK	Garden City Community College	6 ft 3 in (1.91 m)	195 lb (88 kg)	Dec 10, 2017
Terry Wilson #3 QB (JUCO)	Recruit ratings: Scout: Rivals: 247Sports: ESPN:				
Quintin Wilson #12 C	Cincinnati, OH	Turpin High School	6 ft 3 in (1.91 m)	290 lb (130 kg)	May 14, 2017
Quintin Wilson #12 C	Recruit ratings: Scout: Rivals: 247Sports: ESPN:				
Domonique Williams #20 CB (JUCO)	Knoxville, TN	Highland Community College	5 ft 10 in (1.78 m)	190 lb (86 kg)	Jun 15, 2017
Domonique Williams #20 CB (JUCO)	Recruit ratings: Scout: Rivals: 247Sports: ESPN:				
Overall recruit ranking:
Note: In many cases, Scout, Rivals, 247Sports, On3, and ESPN may conflict in their listings of height and weight.; In these cases, the average was taken. ESPN grades are on a 100-point scale.; Sources: "2018 Kentucky Football Commitment List". Rivals.; "2018 Team Ranking". Rivals.com.; "2018 Kentucky Wildcats football team". 247Sports.

== Preseason ==
=== Award watch lists ===
Listed in the order that they were released

Award	Player	Position	Year
Lott Trophy	Josh Allen	LB	SR
Chuck Bednarik Award	Josh Allen	LB	SR
Chuck Bednarik Award	Mike Edwards	S	SR
Maxwell Award	Benny Snell	RB	JR
Doak Walker Award	Benny Snell	RB	JR
John Mackey Award	C. J. Conrad	TE	SR
Butkus Award	Josh Allen	LB	JR
Jim Thorpe Award	Mike Edwards	S	SR
Bronko Nagurski Trophy	Mike Edwards	S	SR
Paul Hornung Award	Lynn Bowden	WR/KR	SO
Wuerffel Trophy	C. J. Conrad	TE	SR
Walter Camp Award	Benny Snell	RB	JR

=== SEC media poll ===
The SEC media poll was released on July 20, 2018, with the Wildcats predicted to finish in fifth place in the East Division.

=== Preseason All-SEC teams ===
The Wildcats had four players selected to the preseason all-SEC teams.

Offense

1st team

Benny Snell – RB

3rd team

C. J. Conrad – TE

Defense

2nd team

Josh Allen – LB

Mike Edwards – DB

== Schedule ==
Date	Time	Opponent	Rank	Site	TV	Result	Attendance
September 1	3:30 p.m.	Central Michigan*		Kroger Field; Lexington, KY	ESPNU	W 35–20	49,138
September 8	7:30 p.m.	at No. 25 Florida		Ben Hill Griffin Stadium; Gainesville, FL (rivalry)	SECN	W 27–16	80,651
September 15	12:00 p.m.	Murray State*		Kroger Field; Lexington, KY	SECN	W 48–10	48,217
September 22	7:00 p.m.	No. 14 Mississippi State		Kroger Field; Lexington, KY	ESPN2	W 28–7	60,037
September 29	7:30 p.m.	South Carolina	No. 17	Kroger Field; Lexington, KY	SECN	W 24–10	63,081
October 6	7:00 p.m.	at Texas A&M	No. 13	Kyle Field; College Station, TX	ESPN	L 14–20 ^{OT}	99,829
October 20	7:30 p.m.	Vanderbilt	No. 14	Kroger Field; Lexington, KY (rivalry)	SECN	W 14–7	54,269
October 27	4:00 p.m.	at Missouri	No. 12	Faurot Field; Columbia, MO	SECN	W 15–14	53,397
November 3	3:30 p.m.	No. 6 Georgia	No. 9	Kroger Field; Lexington, KY (SEC Nation)	CBS	L 17–34	63,543
November 10	3:30 p.m.	at Tennessee	No. 11	Neyland Stadium; Knoxville, TN (rivalry)	SECN	L 7–24	95,258
November 17	12:00 p.m.	Middle Tennessee*	No. 17	Kroger Field; Lexington, KY	SECN	W 34–23	47,535
November 24	7:00 p.m.	at Louisville*	No. 15	Cardinal Stadium; Louisville, KY (Governor's Cup)	ESPN2	W 56–10	49,988
January 1, 2019	1:00 p.m.	vs. No. 12 Penn State*	No. 14	Camping World Stadium; Orlando, FL (Citrus Bowl / SEC Nation)	ABC	W 27–24	59,167
*Non-conference game; Rankings from AP Poll and CFP Rankings after October 30 released prior to game; All times are in Eastern time

== Personnel ==
=== Coaching staff ===
Kentucky head coach Mark Stoops enters his sixth season as the Wildcat's head coach for the 2018 season. During his previous five seasons he led the Wildcats to an overall record of 26 wins and 36 losses.

Name	Position	Consecutive season at Kentucky in current position
Mark Stoops	Head coach	6th
Eddie Gran	Offensive coordinator	3rd
Darin Hinshaw	Co-Offensive coordinator, Quarterbacks	3rd
Matt House	Defensive coordinator, Inside Linebackers	2nd
Michael Smith	Wide receivers	1st
Vince Marrow	Tight ends, recruiting coordinator	6th
John Schlarman	Offensive line	6th
Derrick LeBlanc	Defensive line	2nd
Steve Clinkscale	Defensive backs	3rd
Dean Hood	Special teams, outside linebackers	2nd
Corey Edmond	Director of performance	2nd

=== Roster ===
2018 Kentucky Wildcats football team roster
Players
Coaches
Offense

Pos.	#	Name	Class
WR	1	Lynn Bowden	So
WR	2	Dorian Baker	Sr
QB	3	Terry Wilson	So
RB	5	Sihiem King	Sr
WR	6	Blake Bone	Sr
QB	8	Danny Clark	Fr
RB	10	A. J. Rose	So
WR	11	Tavin Richardson	Jr
QB	12	Gunnar Hoak	So
WR	13	Zy'Aire Hughes	So
WR	14	Ahmad Wagner	Jr
QB	15	Kolbe Langhi	Fr
QB	17	Walker Wood	Fr
WR	18	Clevan Thomas	So
WR	19	Akeem Hayes	Fr
RB	20	Kavosiey Smoke	Fr
WR	23	Brayden Berezowitz	Jr
RB	24	Chris Rodriguez Jr.	Fr
WR	25	Brett Slusher	Jr
RB	26	Benny Snell	Jr
WR	27	Bryan Berezowitz	Jr
RB	28	Zach Johnson	Jr
WR	29	Zac Berezowitz	Fr
RB	30	Donald Smith	So
WR	31	Darren Edmond	Fr
RB	32	Tyler Markray	Fr
WR	33	David Bouvier	Sr
WR	35	John Daido	So
WR	36	Patrick Henschen	So
WR	37	Tyler Beisner	Fr
TE	46	Drew Schlegel	Jr
WR	48	Will Crum	Fr
C	52	Drake Jackson	So
FR	60	Quintin Wilson	Fr
G	61	Austin Dotson	So
G	62	Tyler Couch	Fr
G	64	George Asafo-Adjei	Sr
G	65	Jervontius Stallings	Sr
OT	66	Naasir Watkins	Fr
OT	67	Landon Young (injured)	Jr
G	68	Kenneth Horsey	Fr
G	71	Logan Stenberg	Jr
G	72	E.J. Price	So
OT	73	Matthew Napier	Fr
OT	76	Sebastien Dolcine	Fr
OT	77	Mason Wolfe	So
OT	78	Nick Lewis	Fr
OT	79	Luke Fortner	So
TE	80	Brenden Bates	Fr
WR	81	Isaiah Epps	So
WR	82	Josh Ali	So
TE	83	Justin Rigg	Jr
WR	84	B.J. Alexander	Fr
WR	84	Bryce Oliver	Fr
TE	87	C. J. Conrad	Sr
TE	88	Keaton Upshaw	Fr
WR	89	Allen Dailey	Fr

Defense

Pos.	#	Name	Class
S	3	Jordan Griffin	Jr
DE	4	Josh Paschal	So
CB	6	Lonnie Johnson Jr.	Sr
S	7	Mike Edwards	Sr
CB	8	Derrick Baity	Sr
S	9	Davonte Robinson	So
LB	15	Jordan Wright	Fr
DE	20	Kengera Daniel	Sr
CB	21	Chris Westry	Sr
LB	22	Chris Oats	Fr
S	23	Tyrell Ajian	Fr
S	25	Darius West	Sr
CB	26	Michael Nesbitt	Fr
CB	27	Cedrick Dort	Fr
S	29	Yusuf Corker	Fr
CB	30	Domonique Williams	Jr
LB	31	Jamar Watkins	So
LB	34	Jordan Jones	Sr
CB	35	Immanuel Bowie	Fr
LB	36	Ashtan Pierre	Fr
CB	37	Stanley Garner	Fr
LB	38	William Nalty	So
LB	39	Elijah Barnett	Jr
LB	41	Josh Allen	Sr
LB	43	DeAndre Square	Fr
LB	44	Jamin Davis	Fr
LB	47	Harold Lacy	So
DE	49	Shawn Lawson	Fr
DT	50	Marquan McCall	Fr
DE	55	Davoan Hawkins	Fr
LB	56	Kash Daniel	Jr
LB	58	Alex King	Fr
DT	59	Kordell Looney	So
DE	90	T.J. Carter	Jr
DE	91	Calvin Taylor	Jr
DT	92	Phil Hoskins	Jr
DT	93	Jerquavion Mahone	Fr
DE	94	Abule Abadi-Fitzgerald	Fr
DT	95	Quinton Bohanna	So
DE	97	Chris Whittaker	Fr
DE	98	Tymere Dubose	Sr
DT	99	Adrian Middleton	Sr

Special teams

Pos.	#	Name	Class
LS	42	Tristan Yeomans	Sr
LS	53	Blake Best	Jr
P	86	Grant McKinniss	Jr
P	93	Max Duffy	So
PK	95	Miles Butler	Sr

Head coach

- Mark Stoops

Coordinators/assistant coaches

- Eddie Gran
  Offensive coordinator/running backs
- Darin Hinshaw
  Co-offensive coordinator/quarterbacks coach
- Matt House
  Defensive coordinator/inside linebackers
- Michael Smith
  Wide receivers
- Vince Marrow
  Tight ends/recruiting coordinator
- John Schlarman
  Offensive line
- Derrick LeBlanc
  Defensive line
- Steve Clinkscale
  Defensive backs
- Dean Hood
  Special teams/outside linebackers
- Corey Edmund
  Director of performance

Legend

- (C) Team captain
- (S) Suspended
- (I) Ineligible
- Injured
- Redshirt

Roster
Last update: August 1, 2018

== Game summaries ==
=== Central Michigan ===
Central Michigan at Kentucky

Quarter	1	2	3	4	Total
Chippewas	3	17	0	0	20
Wildcats	7	14	7	7	35

at Kroger Field, Lexington, Kentucky

- Date: September 1, 2018
- Game time: 3:30 p.m. EST
- Game attendance: 49,138
- TV announcers (ESPNU): Kevin Brown (play-by-play), Andre Ware (analyst)

=== At No. 25 Florida ===
Kentucky at No. 25 Florida

Quarter	1	2	3	4	Total
Wildcats	7	0	14	6	27
No. 25 Gators	0	10	0	6	16

at Ben Hill Griffin Stadium, Gainesville, Florida

- Date: September 8, 2018
- Game time: 7:30 p.m. EST
- Game weather: Temperature: 79 °F (26 °C) • Wind: ESE at 1 mile per hour (1.6 km/h) • Weather: 81% humidity, partly cloudy
- Game attendance: 80,651
- Referee: David Smith
- TV announcers (SECN): Tom Hart (play-by-play), Jordan Rodgers (analyst), Cole Cubelic (sideline reporter)

Game information

First Quarter

- Kentucky – David Bouvier 29-yard pass from Terry Wilson (Miles Butler kick), 5:07

Second Quarter

- Florida – Evan McPherson 29-yard field goal, 14:03
- Florida – Moral Stephens 18-yard pass from Feleipe Franks (Evan McPherson kick), 8:27

Third Quarter

- Kentucky – Terry Wilson 24-yard run (Miles Butler kick), 9:49
- Kentucky – Lynn Bowden 54-yard pass from Terry Wilson (Miles Butler kick), 4:11

Fourth Quarter

- Florida – Freddie Swain 4-yard pass from Feleipe Franks, 3:34
- Kentucky – Davonte Robinson 30-yard fumble recovery, 0:00

Passing leaders

- KEN – Terry Wilson – 11/16, 151 yards, 2 touchdowns, 1 interception
- FLA – Feleipe Franks – 17/38, 232 yards, 2 touchdowns, 1 interception

Rushing leaders

- KEN – Benny Snell – 175 yards
- FLA – Feleipe Franks – 44 yards

Receiving leaders

- KEN – Lynn Bowden – 4 receptions, 79 yards, 1 touchdown
- FLA – Kadarius Toney – 2 receptions, 35 yards

Tackling leaders

- KEN – Kash Daniel – 11 tackles
- FLA – Rayshad Jackson – 9 tackles

This was Kentucky's first win over Florida since 1986.

=== Murray State ===
Murray State at Kentucky

Quarter	1	2	3	4	Total
Racers	0	3	0	7	10
Wildcats	7	10	17	14	48

at Kroger Field, Lexington, Kentucky

- Date: September 15, 2018
- Game time: 12:00 p.m. EST
- Game attendance: 48,217
- TV announcers (SECN): Mike Morgan (play-by-play), John Congemi (analyst), Taylor Gray (sideline reporter)

=== No. 14 Mississippi State ===
No. 14 Mississippi State at Kentucky

Quarter	1	2	3	4	Total
No. 14 Bulldogs	0	7	0	0	7
Wildcats	0	7	7	14	28

at Kroger Field, Lexington, Kentucky

- Date: September 22, 2018
- Game time: 7:00 p.m. EST
- Game attendance: 60,037
- TV announcers (ESPN2): Beth Mowins (play-by-play), Anthony Becht (analyst), Rocky Boiman (sideline reporter)

=== South Carolina ===
South Carolina at No. 17 Kentucky

Quarter	1	2	3	4	Total
Gamecocks	3	0	7	0	10
No. 17 Wildcats	3	21	0	0	24

at Kroger Field, Lexington, Kentucky

- Date: September 29, 2018
- Game time: 7:30 p.m. EST
- Game weather: Temperature: 70 °F (21 °C) • Wind: NE 6 mph (9.7 km/h) • Weather: Clear
- Game attendance: 63,081
- Referee: Lee Hedrick
- TV announcers (SECN): Tom Hart (play-by-play), Jordan Rodgers (analyst), Cole Cubelic (sideline reporter)

Game information

First Quarter

- (10:06) UK – Butler 29 yard FG (UK 3–0)
- (05:07) SC – White 29 yard FG (3–3)

Second Quarter

- (14:21) UK – Wilson 1 yard run, Butler kick (UK 10–3)
- (09:15) UK – Rose 24 yard run, Butler kick (UK 17–3)
- (04:53) UK – Snell 4 yard run, Butler kick (UK 24–3)

Third Quarter

- (05:07) SC – Samuel 58 yard pass from Bentley, White kick (UK 24–10)

Total Yards

- SC – 321; 193 passing yards, 128 rushing yards
- UK – 327; 132 passing yards, 195 rushing yards

Passing leader

- SC – Jake Bentley; 13–28, 148 yards, 1 TD, 3 INT
- UK – Terry Wilson; 13–20, 132 yards, 0 TD, 1 INT

Rushing leader

- SC – Rico Dowdle; 13 rushes, 51 yards, 0 TD
- UK – Benny Snell; 28 rushes, 107 yards, 1 TD

Receiving leader

- SC – Deebo Samuel; 2 catches, 61 yards, 1 TD
- UK – C. J. Conrad; 3 catches, 31 yards, 0 TD

Defensive leader

- SC – T. J. Brunson; 8 total tackles, 2 TFL
- UK – Josh Allen; 8 total tackles, 4 TFL, 3 sacks, 1 FF

=== At Texas A&M ===
No. 13 Kentucky at Texas A&M

Quarter	1	2	3	4	OT	Total
No. 13 Wildcats	7	0	0	7	0	14
Aggies	0	7	0	7	6	20

at Kyle Field, College Station, Texas

- Date: October 6, 2018
- Game time: 7:00 p.m. EST
- Game attendance: 99,829
- Referee: Marc Curles
- TV announcers (ESPN): Sean McDonough (play-by-play), Todd Blackledge (analyst), Holly Rowe (sideline reporter)

Game information

First quarter

- UK – Lynn Bowden Jr. 54-yard pass from Terry Wilson (Miles Butler kick), 1:10. Wildcats 7–0. Drive: 5 plays, 68 yards, 2:22.

Second quarter

- TAMU – Quartney Davis 3-yard pass from Kellen Mond (Seth Small kick), 1:14. Tied 7–7. Drive: 12 plays, 70 yards, 4:43.

Third quarter

- No scoring plays

Fourth quarter

- TAMU – Jace Sternberger 46-yard pass from Kellen Mond (Seth Small kick), 10:13. Aggies 14–7. Drive: 2 plays, 48 yards, 0:54.
- UK – Kent West 40-yard fumble return (Mile Butler kick), 4:17. Tied 14–14.

Overtime

- TAMU – Trayveon Williams 10-yard run. TAMU 20–14. Drive: 4 plays, 25 yards.

Leading Passers

- UK – Terry Wilson – 13/20, 108 yards, TD
- TAMU – Kellen Mond – 18/29, 226 yards, 2 TD, INT

Leading Rushers

- UK – Benny Snell – 13 carries, 60 yards
- TAMU – Trayveon Williams – 24 carries, 138 yards, TD

Leading Receivers

- UK – Lynn Bowden – 3 receptions, 55 yards, TD
- TAMU – Jace Sternberger – 5 receptions, 95 yards, TD

=== Vanderbilt ===
Vanderbilt at No. 14 Kentucky

Quarter	1	2	3	4	Total
Commodores	7	0	0	0	7
No. 14 Wildcats	0	7	0	7	14

at Kroger Field, Lexington, Kentucky

- Date: October 20, 2018
- Game time: 7:30 p.m. EST
- Game attendance: 54,269
- TV announcers (SECN): Tom Hart (play-by-play), Jordan Rodgers (analyst), Cole Cubelic (sideline reporter)

=== At Missouri ===
No. 12 Kentucky at Missouri

Quarter	1	2	3	4	Total
No. 12 Wildcats	3	0	0	12	15
Tigers	0	14	0	0	14

at Faurot Field, Columbia, Missouri

- Date: October 27, 2018
- Game time: 4:00 p.m. EST
- Game attendance: 53,397
- TV announcers (SECN): Taylor Zarzour (play-by-play), Matt Stinchcomb (analyst), Kris Budden (sideline reporter)

=== No. 6 Georgia ===
No. 6 Georgia at No. 9 Kentucky

Quarter	1	2	3	4	Total
No. 6 Bulldogs	7	7	14	6	34
No. 9 Wildcats	0	3	7	7	17

at Kroger Field, Lexington, Kentucky

- Date: November 3, 2018
- Game time: 3:30 p.m. EST
- TV announcers (CBS): Carter Blackburn (play-by-play), Rick Neuheisel (co-analyst), Aaron Taylor (co-analyst), John Schriffen (sideline reporter)

=== At Tennessee ===
No. 12 Kentucky at Tennessee

Quarter	1	2	3	4	Total
No. 12 Wildcats	0	0	7	0	7
Volunteers	3	14	7	0	24

at Neyland Stadium, Knoxville, Tennessee

- Date: November 10, 2018
- Game time: 3:30 p.m. EST
- Game attendance: 95,258
- TV announcers (SECN): John Congemi (play-by-play), Taylor Zarzour (color), Kris Budden (sidelines)

=== Middle Tennessee ===
Middle Tennessee at No. 17 Kentucky

Quarter	1	2	3	4	Total
Blue Raiders	0	10	6	7	23
No. 17 Wildcats	17	7	7	3	34

at Kroger Field, Lexington, Kentucky

- Date: November 17, 2018
- Game time: Noon EST
- Game attendance: 47,535
- TV: SECN Alternate

=== At Louisville ===
No. 15 Kentucky at Louisville

Quarter	1	2	3	4	Total
No. 15 Wildcats	14	21	0	21	56
Cardinals	7	3	0	0	10

at Cardinal Stadium, Louisville, Kentucky

- Date: November 24, 2018
- Game time: 7:00 p.m. EST
- TV: ESPN2

=== Vs. Penn State (Citrus Bowl) ===
Kentucky vs. Penn State

Quarter	1	2	3	4	Total
No. 14 Wildcats	10	0	17	0	27
No. 12 Nittany Lions	0	7	0	17	24

at Camping World Stadium, Orlando, Florida

- Date: January 1, 2019
- Game time: 1:00 p.m. EST
- Game weather: 79 °F (26 °C); bright sunshine, warm, humid
- Game attendance: 59,167
- Referee: Riley Johnson
- TV announcers (ABC): Dave Flemming, Brock Huard, Laura Rutledge

Game information

First quarter

- UK – Miles Butler, 28-yard field goal, 12:23 (UK 3–0)
- UK – Lynn Bowden, 58-yard TD punt return, Butler kick good, 0:45 (UK 10–0)

Second quarter

- PSU – Nick Bowers, 1-yard TD pass from Trace McSorley, Jake Pinegar kick good, 13:56 (UK 10–7)

Third quarter

- UK – Benny Snell, 2-yard TD run, Butler kick good, 12:38 (UK 17–7)
- UK – Butler, 28-yard field goal, 3:48 (UK 20–7)
- UK – Snell, 12-yard TD run, Butler kick good, 1:35 (UK 27–7)

Fourth quarter

- PSU – McSorley, 1-yard TD run, Pinegar kick good, 13:37 (UK 27–14)
- PSU – Pat Freiermuth, 18-yard TD pass from McSorley, Pinegar kick good, 9:00 (UK 27–21)
- PSU – Pinegar, 32-yard field goal, 4:12 (UK 27–24)

Top passers

- PSU – Trace McSorley – 17/33, 246 yards, 2 TD, INT
- UK – Terry Wilson – 9/15, 121 yards

Top rushers

- PSU – Trace McSorley – 19 carries, 75 yards, TD
- UK – Benny Snell – 26 carries, 144 yards, 2 TD

Top receivers

- PSU – DeAndre Thompkins – 4 receptions, 74 yards
- UK – Lynn Bowden – 5 receptions, 84 yards

Top defenders

- PSU – Micah Parsons – 13 tackles
- UK – Darius West – 10 tackles

== Rankings ==
Ranking movements Legend: ██ Increase in ranking ██ Decrease in ranking — = Not ranked RV = Received votes
	Week															
Poll	Pre	1	2	3	4	5	6	7	8	9	10	11	12	13	14	Final
AP	RV	—	RV	RV	17	13	18	14	12	11	12	20	17	16	16	12
Coaches	RV	RV	RV	RV	17	15	20	17	14	12	12	21	18	15	15	11
CFP	Not released									9	11	17	15	15	14	Not released

== Players drafted into the NFL ==
Kentucky had five players selected in the 2019 NFL draft.

Round	Pick	Player	Position	NFL club
1	7	Josh Allen	LB	Jacksonville Jaguars
2	54	Lonnie Johnson Jr.	CB	Houston Texans
3	99	Mike Edwards	S	Tampa Bay Buccaneers
4	122	Benny Snell	RB	Pittsburgh Steelers
7	232	George Asafo-Adjei	OG	New York Giants
