= Carolina Panthers all-time roster =

883 players have appeared in at least one regular season or postseason game in the National Football League (NFL) for the Carolina Panthers since 1995. This list is accurate through the end of the 2025 NFL season.

== A ==
- Ameer Abdullah
- Clifton Abraham
- Darvin Adams
- Joe Adams
- Mike Adams
- Mario Addison
- Seyi Ajirotutu
- Brent Alexander
- Frank Alexander
- Gerald Alexander
- Brian Allen
- Jared Allen
- Kyle Allen
- C. J. Anderson
- Derek Anderson
- Henry Anderson
- James Anderson
- Rashard Anderson
- Eli Apple
- Antwan Applewhite
- Alex Armah
- Dan Arnold
- Cameron Artis-Payne
- Thomas Austin
- Jason Avant

== B ==
- Carlton Bailey
- Eugene Baker
- Jason Baker
- Myron Baker
- Randy Baldwin
- Marcus Ball
- Kenjon Barner
- Krys Barnes
- Tommy Barnhardt
- Gary Barnidge
- Amaré Barno
- Micheal Barrow
- Shemar Bartholomew
- Brett Basanez
- Boogie Basham
- Idrees Bashir
- Michael Bates
- Marco Battaglia
- Jon Beason
- Don Beebe
- Byron Bell
- D'Anthony Bell
- Vonn Bell
- Kelvin Benjamin
- Brandon Bennett
- Bené Benwikere
- Mackenzy Bernadeau
- Brenton Bersin
- Steve Beuerlein
- Tim Biakabutuka
- Duane Bickett
- Taye Biddle
- Nathan Black
- Chase Blackburn
- Raheem Blackshear
- Marquise Blair
- Rob Bohlinger
- Juran Bolden
- Travis Bond
- Reggie Bonnafon
- Steve Bono
- Mike Boone
- Dicaprio Bootle
- Tre Boston
- A. J. Bouye
- Bradley Bozeman
- James Bradberry
- Jeff Brady
- Colin Branch
- Tyler Brayton
- Jeremy Bridges
- Teddy Bridgewater
- Anthony Bright
- Richie Brockel
- Blake Brockermeyer
- Jonathon Brooks
- Luther Broughton
- Jamall Broussard
- Bobby Brown III
- Corey Brown
- Dee Brown
- Deonte Brown
- Derrick Brown
- Everette Brown
- Spencer Brown
- Tony Brown
- Bryant Browning
- Doug Brzezinski
- Brentson Buckner
- Dialleo Burks
- Brian Burns
- Juston Burris
- Antwon Burton
- Shane Burton
- Paul Butcher
- Darius Butler
- Vernon Butler
- Jeff Byers
- Carrington Byndom
- Butler B'ynote'
- Damiere Byrd
- Isaac Byrd
- Jairus Byrd
- Dion Byrum

== C ==
- Travaris Cadet
- Mike Caldwell
- Bruce Campbell
- D. J. Campbell
- Dalevon Campbell
- Matt Campbell
- Trenton Cannon
- David Carr
- T. J. Carrie
- Mark Carrier
- Rae Carruth
- Jordan Carstens
- Drew Carter
- Jermaine Carter
- Todd Carter
- Jeremy Cash
- Antoine Cason
- Tariq Castro-Fields
- Chandler Catanzaro
- Jeff Chandler
- Nate Chandler
- Sean Chandler
- D. J. Chark
- Saahdiq Charles
- Joseph Charlton
- Claudin Cherelus
- Larry Chester
- Jeremy Chinn
- Dan Chisena
- Robbie Chosen
- Brady Christensen
- Bob Christian
- Vinny Ciurciu
- Chris Clark
- Jimmy Clausen
- Kaelin Clay
- David Clowney
- Jadeveon Clowney
- Ross Cockrell
- Jalen Coker
- Keary Colbert
- Colin Cole
- Matt Cole
- Kurt Coleman
- Kerry Collins
- Tim Colston
- Darion Conner
- Dan Connor
- Sean Considine
- Alex Cook
- Toi Cook
- Deke Cooper
- Jarrod Cooper
- Pharoh Cooper
- Austin Corbett
- Chad Cota
- Jerricho Cotchery
- Terry Cousin
- Bryan Cox Jr.
- Demetrious Cox
- Dameyune Craig
- Casey Cramer
- Casey Crawford
- Keion Crossen
- Jaden Crumedy
- Quinton Culberson
- Richie Cunningham
- Jake Curhan
- Donté Curry

== D ==
- Dennis Daley
- DeeJay Dallas
- Andy Dalton
- Sam Darnold
- Norberto Davidds-Garrido
- C. J. Davis
- Eric Davis
- Mike Davis
- Rod Davis
- Stephen Davis
- Tae Davis
- Thomas Davis Sr.
- Thomas DeCoud
- Ryan Delaire
- Jake Delhomme
- Curtis Deloatch
- Patrick Dendy
- Mark Dennis
- James Dexter
- Ed Dickson
- Na'il Diggs
- Antonio Dingle
- J. D. DiRenzo
- Travell Dixon
- James Dockery
- Kevin Donnalley
- Greg Dortch
- Lorenzo Doss
- Rasul Douglas
- Rico Dowdle
- Chris Draft
- Damane Duckett
- Tim Duckworth
- Mike Dulaney
- Kenny Dyson
- Kevin Dyson

== E ==
- Kony Ealy
- Jacob Eason
- Antonio Edwards
- Armanti Edwards
- Dwan Edwards
- Lac Edwards
- Lavar Edwards
- Ron Edwards
- Ikem Ekwonu
- Corn Elder
- Pat Elflein
- Javien Elliott
- Matt Elliott
- Alex Erickson
- Cameron Erving
- Trevor Etienne
- Akayleb Evans
- Doug Evans
- Mitchell Evans

== F ==
- Terry Fair
- Caleb Farley
- Matthias Farley
- Brett Faryniarz
- Randy Fasani
- Mario Fatafehi
- Christian Fauria
- Greg Favors
- Jerome Felton
- Tony Fiammetta
- Jeff Fields
- Mark Fields
- Ronald Fields
- Cortland Finnegan
- Ryan Fitzgerald
- Derrick Fletcher
- Drayton Florence
- William Floyd
- Brian Folkerts
- Todd Fordham
- D'Onta Foreman
- DeShaun Foster
- David Foucault
- Mike Fox
- Morgan Fox
- Sam Franklin Jr.
- Feleipe Franks
- Mose Frazier
- Royce Freeman
- Sione Fua
- Curtis Fuller
- Jordan Fuller
- Devin Funchess

== G ==
- Andrew Gachkar
- Michael Gaines
- Omar Gaither
- Chris Gamble
- Graham Gano
- Frank Garcia
- Rod Gardner
- Percell Gaskins
- Rashaan Gaulden
- David Gettis
- Gary Gibson
- Garrett Gilbert
- Sean Gilbert
- Cam Gill
- Stephon Gilmore
- Ted Ginn Jr.
- Trevis Gipson
- Charles Godfrey
- Nick Goings
- Zane Gonzalez
- Mike Goodson
- Gino Gradkowski
- Derrick Graham
- Shayne Graham
- Deon Grant
- Derwin Gray
- Bucky Greeley
- Ray Green
- T. J. Green
- Willie Green
- Kevin Greene
- Scott Greene
- Will Grier
- Michael Griffin
- Shaquill Griffin
- Howard Griffith
- Otis Grigsby
- Jordan Gross
- Yetur Gross-Matos
- Kamu Grugier-Hill
- Eric Guliford
- LaDarius Gunter

== H ==
- D. J. Hackett
- Lirim Hajrullahu
- Daeshon Hall
- Alan Haller
- Darren Hambrick
- Woodrow Hamilton
- William Hampton
- Geoff Hangartner
- Karl Hankton
- Greg Hardy
- Jermaine Hardy
- Deveron Harper
- Madre Harper
- Roman Harper
- Charles Harris
- Chris Harris
- Joey Harris
- Jonathan Harris
- Nic Harris
- Ra'Shon Harris
- Myles Hartsfield
- Ben Hartsock
- Justin Hartwig
- Michael Hawkes
- Artrell Hawkins
- Donald Hawkins
- Josh Hawkins
- Nick Hayden
- Jovan Haye
- Brandon Hayes
- Donald Hayes
- Tae Hayes
- Alex Haynes
- Marquis Haynes
- Taylor Hearn
- Taylor Heinicke
- Keith Heinrich
- Johnny Hekker
- Nate Hemsley
- C. J. Henderson
- Frank Herron
- Chris Hetherington
- Rashard Higgins
- Jon Hilbert
- Travis Hill
- Troy Hill
- Jermale Hines
- Jimmy Hitchcock
- Domenik Hixon
- Leroy Hoard
- Abdul Hodge
- Brandon Hogan
- Chris Hogan
- Doug Hogue
- Rob Holmberg
- Brad Hoover
- Jaycee Horn
- Jimmy Horn Jr.
- Mike Horton
- Wes Horton
- Phil Hoskins
- Justin Houston
- Reggie Howard
- Chuba Hubbard
- Marcus Hudson
- Deon Humphrey
- Robert Hunt
- Richard Huntley
- Hayden Hurst

== I ==
- Thomas Incoom
- Matt Ioannidis
- Bruce Irvin
- Corvey Irvin
- Rocket Ismail
- Joel Iyiegbuniwe

== J ==
- Brad Jackson
- Cam Jackson
- Dane Jackson
- Donte Jackson
- Eddie Jackson
- Gabe Jackson
- Lamar Jackson
- Mike Jackson
- Rashawn Jackson
- Tarron Jackson
- Ben Jacobs
- Natrell Jamerson
- Jeno James
- Brandon Jamison
- D'Shawn Jamison
- J. J. Jansen
- Paul Janus
- Dwayne Jarrett
- Patrick Jeffers
- Kris Jenkins
- Jerry Jensen
- Nash Jensen
- Tommy Jeter
- Josey Jewell
- Anthony Johnson
- Charles Johnson
- Darryl Johnson
- Diontae Johnson
- D. J. Johnson
- Ed Johnson
- Keyshawn Johnson
- Landon Johnson
- Leonard Johnson
- Lonnie Johnson Jr.
- Clay Johnston
- Clarence Jones
- Colin Jones
- DaQuan Jones
- Deion Jones
- Donta Jones
- Ernest Jones
- Kobe Jones
- Mark Jones
- Patrick Jones II
- Reggie Jones
- Velus Jones Jr.
- Leander Jordan
- Michael Jordan
- Omari Jordan

== K ==
- Dave Kadela
- Matt Kalil
- Ryan Kalil
- John Kasay
- Matt Kaskey
- Frank Kearse
- Thomas Keiser
- Maʻake Kemoeatu
- Zach Kerr
- Cedric Killings
- Brian Kinchen
- Jeff King
- Kalen King
- Shawn King
- Jarrett Kingston
- Keith Kirkwood
- A. J. Klein
- Greg Kragen
- Luke Kuechly
- Jordan Kunaszyk
- Jason Kyle

== L ==
- Corbin Lacina
- Brandon LaFell
- Derek Landri
- Fred Lane
- Austin Larkin
- Tyler Larsen
- Lamar Lathon
- Shaq Lawson
- Andy Lee
- Ricky Lee
- Xavier Legette
- Louis Leonard
- Eku Leota
- Robert Lester
- Damien Lewis
- Damione Lewis
- Jeff Lewis
- Greg Little
- Cory Littleton
- Greg Lloyd
- Rhys Lloyd
- Steve Lofton
- David Long
- Star Lotulelei
- Kyle Love
- Sean Love
- Al Lucas
- Ken Lucas
- Cole Luke
- Brad Lundblade
- Frankie Luvu
- Matt Lytle

== M ==
- Brendan Mahon
- Kris Mangum
- Chris Manhertz
- Ricky Manning
- Marquand Manuel
- Olindo Mare
- Dean Marlowe
- Richard Marshall
- Terrace Marshall Jr.
- Charly Martin
- Emerson Martin
- Kamal Martin
- Sam Martin
- Sherrod Martin
- Bam Martin-Scott
- Evan Mathis
- Jordan Matthews
- Vili Maumau
- Brett Maxie
- Baker Mayfield
- David Mayo
- Cade Mays
- Kevin McCadam
- Christian McCaffrey
- Marquan McCall
- Robert McClain
- Terrell McClain
- Ray-Ray McCloud
- Stanley McClover
- Josh McCown
- Gerald McCoy
- Justin McCray
- Marlon McCree
- Emmanuel McDaniel
- Bubba McDowell
- Stacy McGee
- Garrett McGhin
- Lenny McGill
- Alvin McKinley
- Tim McKyer
- Tetairoa McMillan
- Marvin McNutt
- Natrone Means
- Justin Medlock
- Rashaan Melvin
- Eric Metcalf
- Pete Metzelaars
- Marken Michel
- Quintin Mikell
- John Milem
- Christian Miller
- John Miller
- Les Miller
- Ernie Mills
- Sam Mills
- Jonathan Mingo
- Kory Minor
- Mike Minter
- James Mitchell
- Jeff Mitchell
- Mike Mitchell
- Tre'von Moehrig
- Donte Moncrief
- Joe Montgomery
- Will Montgomery
- Jeremiah Moon
- D. J. Moore (born 1987)
- D. J. Moore (born 1997)
- David Moore
- Derrick Moore
- Kenneth Moore
- Matt Moore
- Kindal Moorehead
- Tim Morabito
- Dan Morgan
- Chris Morris
- Christian Morton
- Arron Mosby
- Taylor Moton
- Muhsin Muhammad
- Israel Mukuamu
- Roderick Mullen
- Captain Munnerlyn
- Louis Murphy

== N ==
- Legedu Naanee
- Haruki Nakamura
- Hannibal Navies
- Andre Neblett
- Joe Nedney
- Bruce Nelson
- Jonathan Nelson
- Jamar Nesbit
- Marshall Newhouse
- Cam Newton
- Nate Newton
- Yosh Nijman
- Daviyon Nixon
- Maema Njongmeta
- Josh Norman
- Jared Norris
- Brad Nortman
- Andrew Norwell
- Eric Norwood
- Kevin Norwood
- Ogemdi Nwagbuo

== O ==
- Efe Obada
- Chris Ogbonnaya
- Michael Oher
- Russell Okung
- Winslow Oliver
- Greg Olsen
- Patrick Omameh
- Frank Omiyale
- Kenny Onatolu
- Chris Orr
- Jeff Otah

== P ==
- Michael Palardy
- Matt Paradis
- Aaron Parker
- A. J. Parker
- J'Vonne Parker
- Ron Parker
- Spencer Paysinger
- Rodney Peete
- Jayden Peevy
- Julius Peppers
- Jason Peter
- Andrew Peterson
- Rob Petitti
- Perry Phenix
- Jason Phillips
- Dino Philyaw
- Damon Pieri
- Tony Pike
- Kealoha Pilares
- Eddy Piñeiro
- Cleveland Pinkney
- Kavika Pittman
- Austen Pleasants
- Dontari Poe
- Mike Pollak
- Tauren Poole
- Tyrone Poole
- Jeff Posey
- De'Andre Presley
- DeMario Pressley
- Shawn Price
- Troy Pride
- Ricky Proehl
- Jordan Pugh

== Q ==
- Shaq Quarterman

== R ==
- Lathan Ransom
- Walter Rasby
- Kemp Rasmussen
- LaBryan Ray
- Israel Raybon
- Andrew Raym
- Darrin Reaves
- Haason Reddick
- Kevin Reddick
- Anthony Redmon
- Chris Reed
- Michael Reed
- Frank Reich
- Eric Reid
- Spencer Reid
- Mike Remmers
- Hunter Renfrow
- Tutan Reyes
- Jon Rhattigan
- Giovanni Ricci
- Damien Richardson
- Demani Richardson
- Andre Roberts
- Sam Roberts
- Seth Roberts
- Jamal Robertson
- A'Shawn Robinson
- Corey Robinson
- Eugene Robinson
- Jammie Robinson
- Kenny Robinson
- Ryne Robinson
- Robert Rochell
- Mark Rodenhauser
- Dante Rosario
- Micah Ross
- Bravvion Roy
- Andre Royal
- Christian Rozeboom
- Mike Rucker
- Anderson Russell

== S ==
- Tarek Saleh
- Nate Salley
- Nick Samac
- Curtis Samuel
- Zack Sanchez
- Ja'Tavion Sanders
- Miles Sanders
- Ryan Santoso
- Don Sasa
- Todd Sauerbrun
- C. J. Saunders
- Jordan Scarlett
- Michael Schofield
- Geoff Schwartz
- Steve Scifres
- Chris Scott
- Nick Scott
- Trent Scott
- Nic Scourton
- Mike Scurlock
- Ray Seals
- Da'Norris Searcy
- Mike Seidman
- George Selvie
- Jordan Senn
- Adam Seward
- Kevon Seymour
- David Sharpe
- Tim Shaw
- Eric Shelton
- Laviska Shenault
- Russell Shepard
- Jamie Sheriff
- Jason Shirley
- Jeremy Shockey
- Brandon Short
- Kawann Short
- Ricky Siglar
- Amini Silatolu
- Isaiah Simmons
- Terrance Simmons
- Scott Simonson
- Greg Skrepenak
- Chris Slade
- Joey Slye
- Rod Smart
- Andre Smith
- Armond Smith
- Brandon Smith
- Chuck Smith
- D. J. Smith
- Kelvin Smith
- Lamar Smith
- Rod Smith
- Rodney Smith
- Shi Smith
- Steve Smith
- T. J. Smith
- Torrey Smith
- Ihmir Smith-Marsette
- Chau Smith-Wade
- Willie Snead
- Paul Soliai
- Dezmen Southward
- Brian St. Pierre
- Julian Stanford
- R. J. Stanford
- Rohn Stark
- Todd Steussie
- Tommy Stevens
- Jonathan Stewart
- Bryan Stoltenberg
- Dwight Stone
- Mike Strachan
- Derrick Strait
- Stephen Sullivan
- Ryan Sutter
- Tyrell Sutton
- Eric Swann
- Michael Swift

== T ==
- Kinnon Tatum
- Josh Taves
- Adarius Taylor
- Hilee Taylor
- Keith Taylor
- Quinton Teal
- Sam Tecklenburg
- Pat Terrell
- Chris Terry
- Rick Terry
- Vinny Testaverde
- Adam Thielen
- Blair Thomas
- Devin Thomas
- Hollis Thomas
- Ian Thomas
- Josh Thomas
- Mark Thomas
- Trevian Thomas
- Stantley Thomas-Oliver
- Deven Thompkins
- Colin Thompson
- Shaq Thompson
- Corey Thornton
- Calvin Throckmorton
- Nick Thurman
- Charles Tillman
- Lawyer Tillman
- Travares Tillman
- Mike Tolbert
- Brett Toth
- Steve Tovar
- Lester Towns
- Brycen Tremayne
- Tommy Tremble
- Jack Trudeau
- Esera Tuaolo
- Sean Tufts
- Renaldo Turnbull
- Nate Turner
- Trai Turner
- Melvin Tuten
- Shy Tuttle
- Tank Tyler
- Rich Tylski

== U ==
- Princely Umanmielen
- Iheanyi Uwaezuoke

== V ==
- Greg Van Roten
- Josh Vaughan
- Tony Veland
- Fernando Velasco
- Luiji Vilain
- Danny Villa
- Keydrick Vincent

== W ==
- Mike Wahle
- Darwin Walker
- P. J. Walker
- Al Wallace
- Trevin Wallace
- Wesley Walls
- Ken Walter
- Brandon Walton
- Stephen Weatherly
- Joe Webb
- Sam Webb
- Larry Webster III
- Brandon Wegher
- Chris Weinke
- Dean Wells
- Reggie Wells
- Ryan Wendell
- Dante Wesley
- Tershawn Wharton
- Travelle Wharton
- Leonard Wheeler
- DeAndrew White
- Melvin White
- Reggie White
- Tahir Whitehead
- Curtis Whitley
- Fozzy Whittaker
- Jermaine Wiggins
- Garnell Wilds
- Chuck Wiley
- Brandon Williams
- Daryl Williams
- DeAngelo Williams
- DeShawn Williams
- Garry Williams
- Gerald Williams
- Jamar Williams
- Jason Williams
- Jay Williams
- Louis Williams
- Preston Williams
- Shaun Williams
- Teddy Williams
- Thomas Williams
- Zack Williams
- Matt Willig
- C. J. Wilson
- Damien Wilson
- Gillis Wilson
- Kion Wilson
- Jacoby Windmon
- Ryan Winslow
- Will Witherspoon
- Bryan Witzmann
- D. J. Wonnum
- Lee Woodall
- Xavier Woods
- Chandler Wooten
- Vince Workman
- Daryl Worley
- Chris Wormley
- Jarius Wright
- Matthew Wright

== Y ==
- David Yankey
- Russ Yeast
- Bryce Young
- Lou Young
- Walter Young

== Z ==
- Chandler Zavala
- Jeff Zgonina
- Lee Ziemba
- Brandon Zylstra
