= Brad White (American football coach) =

American football player and coach (born 1982)

Current position
- Title: Defensive coordinator
- Team: Florida
- Conference: SEC

Biographical details
- Born: August 13, 1982 (age 43); Concord, Massachusetts, U.S.

Playing career
- 2000: Georgia
- 2001–2004: Wake Forest
- Position: Linebacker

Coaching career (HC unless noted)
- 2007–2008: Wake Forest (GA)
- 2009: Murray State (S)
- 2010–2011: Air Force (ILB)
- 2012–2013: Indianapolis Colts (DQC)
- 2014: Indianapolis Colts (asst. LB)
- 2015–2017: Indianapolis Colts (OLB)
- 2018: Kentucky (OLB)
- 2019–2025: Kentucky (DC/OLB)
- 2026–present: Florida (DC)

Brad White (born August 13, 1982) is an American football coach who is currently the defensive coordinator for the University of Florida, a position he has held since 2026. He previously served as the outside linebackers coach and defensive coordinator for the University of Kentucky from 2018 to 2025.

== Playing career ==
White turned down an offer to play college football at Yale to walk-on at Georgia, but did not play a season with the Bulldogs, opting to transfer after head coach Jim Donnan was fired and replaced by Mark Richt. He transferred to Wake Forest, where former Georgia assistant Brad Lambert was recently hired as their linebackers coach.

In his first season at Wake Forest, he led the team in total tackles with 94, including 24 tackles against Navy, the most by a Wake Forest player during the Jim Grobe era. He finished his career with 227 total tackles, while starting 34 of the 35 games he played in.

== Coaching career ==
After working at Bank of America as a portfolio management analyst for a couple of years, White joined the coaching staff of his alma mater Wake Forest as a graduate assistant. He was named the safeties coach at Murray State in 2009 and spent one season there before moving on to coaching the inside linebackers at Air Force, working under former Wake Forest offensive coordinator Troy Calhoun. He joined the Indianapolis Colts in 2012 as a defensive quality control coach and worked his way up to outside linebackers coach in 2015, spending six seasons in total with the Colts.

White was named the outside linebackers coach at Kentucky in 2018 as the 10th on-field assistant coach, joining his former defensive coordinator at Wake Forest, Dean Hood, who was the special teams coordinator at Kentucky at the time. He was promoted to defensive coordinator in 2019 after Matt House left to accept an NFL coaching position.
