= 2019 Kentucky Wildcats football team =

American college football season

2019 Kentucky Wildcats football

Belk Bowl champion

Belk Bowl, W 37–30 vs. Virginia Tech
- Conference: Southeastern Conference
- Eastern Division
- Record: 8–5 (3–5 SEC)
- Head coach: Mark Stoops (7th season)
- Offensive coordinator: Eddie Gran (4th season)
- Co-offensive coordinator: Darin Hinshaw (4th season)
- Offensive scheme: Spread
- Defensive coordinator: Brad White (1st season)
- Base defense: 3–4 or 4–3
- Home stadium: Kroger Field

Uniform
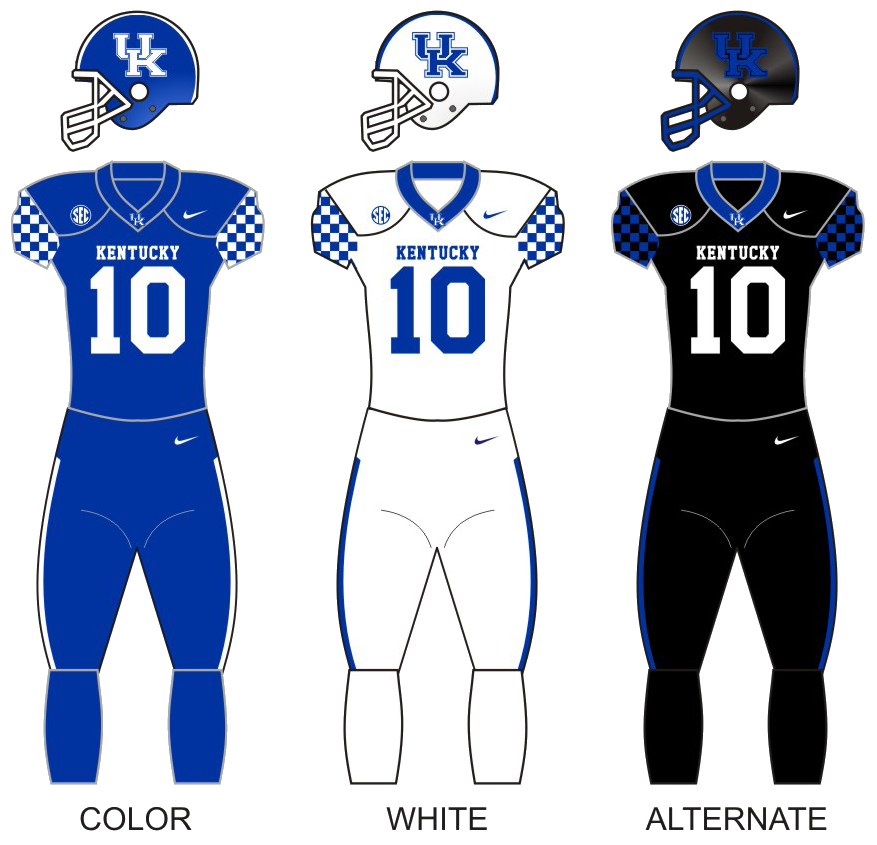

2019 Southeastern Conference football standings
	Conf.			Overall
Team	W		L	W		L
Eastern Division
No. 4 Georgia x	7	–	1	12	–	2
No. 6 Florida	6	–	2	11	–	2
Tennessee *	5	–	3	8	–	5
Kentucky	3	–	5	8	–	5
Missouri *	3	–	5	6	–	6
South Carolina	3	–	5	4	–	8
Vanderbilt	1	–	7	3	–	9
Western Division
No. 1 LSU x$#^	8	–	0	15	–	0
No. 8 Alabama	6	–	2	11	–	2
No. 14 Auburn	5	–	3	9	–	4
Texas A&M	4	–	4	8	–	5
Mississippi State	3	–	5	6	–	7
Ole Miss	2	–	6	4	–	8
Arkansas	0	–	8	2	–	10
Championship: LSU 37, Georgia 10
# – College Football Playoff champion; ^ – College Football Playoff participant; $ – Conference champion; x – Division champion/co-champions; * – Tennessee vacated all wins due to NCAA violations. Missouri was ineligible for postseason due to NCAA sanctions.; Rankings from AP Poll

The 2019 Kentucky Wildcats football team represented the University of Kentucky in the 2019 NCAA Division I FBS football season. The Wildcats played their home games at Kroger Field in Lexington, Kentucky, and competed in the East Division of the Southeastern Conference (SEC). They were led by seventh-year head coach Mark Stoops.

== Preseason ==
=== SEC preseason poll ===
The 2019 SEC Media Days were held July 15–18 in Birmingham, Alabama. In the preseason media poll, Kentucky was projected to finish in sixth in the East Division.

=== Preseason All-SEC teams ===
The Wildcats had four players selected to the preseason all-SEC teams.

Offense

3rd team

Logan Stenberg – OL

Drake Jackson – C

Defense

3rd team

Kash Daniel – LB

Specialists

3rd team

Lynn Bowden – all-purpose player

== Schedule ==
Kentucky announced its 2019 football schedule on September 18, 2018.

Date	Time	Opponent	Site	TV	Result	Attendance
August 31	12:00 p.m.	Toledo*	Kroger Field; Lexington, KY	SECN	W 38–24	54,610
September 7	7:30 p.m.	Eastern Michigan*	Kroger Field; Lexington, KY	SECN Alt.	W 38–17	55,240
September 14	7:00 p.m.	No. 9 Florida	Kroger Field; Lexington, KY (rivalry, SEC Nation)	ESPN	L 21–29	63,076
September 21	4:00 p.m.	at Mississippi State	Davis Wade Stadium; Starkville, MS	SECN	L 13–28	54,556
September 28	7:30 p.m.	at South Carolina	Williams–Brice Stadium; Columbia, SC	SECN	L 7–24	80,828
October 12	7:30 p.m.	Arkansas^{†}	Kroger Field; Lexington, KY	SECN	W 24–20	57,060
October 19	6:00 p.m.	at No. 10 Georgia	Sanford Stadium; Athens, GA	ESPN	L 0–21	92,746
October 26	7:30 p.m.	Missouri	Kroger Field; Lexington, KY	SECN	W 29–7	48,446
November 9	7:30 p.m.	Tennessee	Kroger Field; Lexington, KY (rivalry)	SECN	L 13–17	56,760
November 16	3:30 p.m.	at Vanderbilt	Vanderbilt Stadium; Nashville, TN (rivalry)	SECN	W 38–14	23,288
November 23	3:30 p.m.	UT Martin*	Kroger Field; Lexington, KY	SECN	W 50–7	41,495
November 30	12:00 p.m.	Louisville*	Kroger Field; Lexington, KY (Governor's Cup)	SECN	W 45–13	48,336
December 31	12:00 p.m.	vs. Virginia Tech*	Bank of America Stadium; Charlotte, NC (Belk Bowl)	ESPN	W 37–30	44,138
*Non-conference game; ^{†}Homecoming; Rankings from AP Poll and CFP Rankings after November 5 released prior to game; All times are in Eastern time

== Game summaries ==
=== Toledo ===
	1	2	3	4	Total
Rockets	7	7	3	7	24
Wildcats	0	14	10	14	38

=== Eastern Michigan ===
	1	2	3	4	Total
Eagles	0	3	7	7	17
Wildcats	14	3	7	14	38

=== Florida ===
	1	2	3	4	Total
No. 9 Gators	7	0	3	19	29
Wildcats	0	14	7	0	21

=== At Mississippi State ===
	1	2	3	4	Total
Wildcats	3	0	7	3	13
Bulldogs	7	14	0	7	28

=== At South Carolina ===
	1	2	3	4	Total
Wildcats	0	0	0	7	7
Gamecocks	7	3	7	7	24

=== Arkansas ===
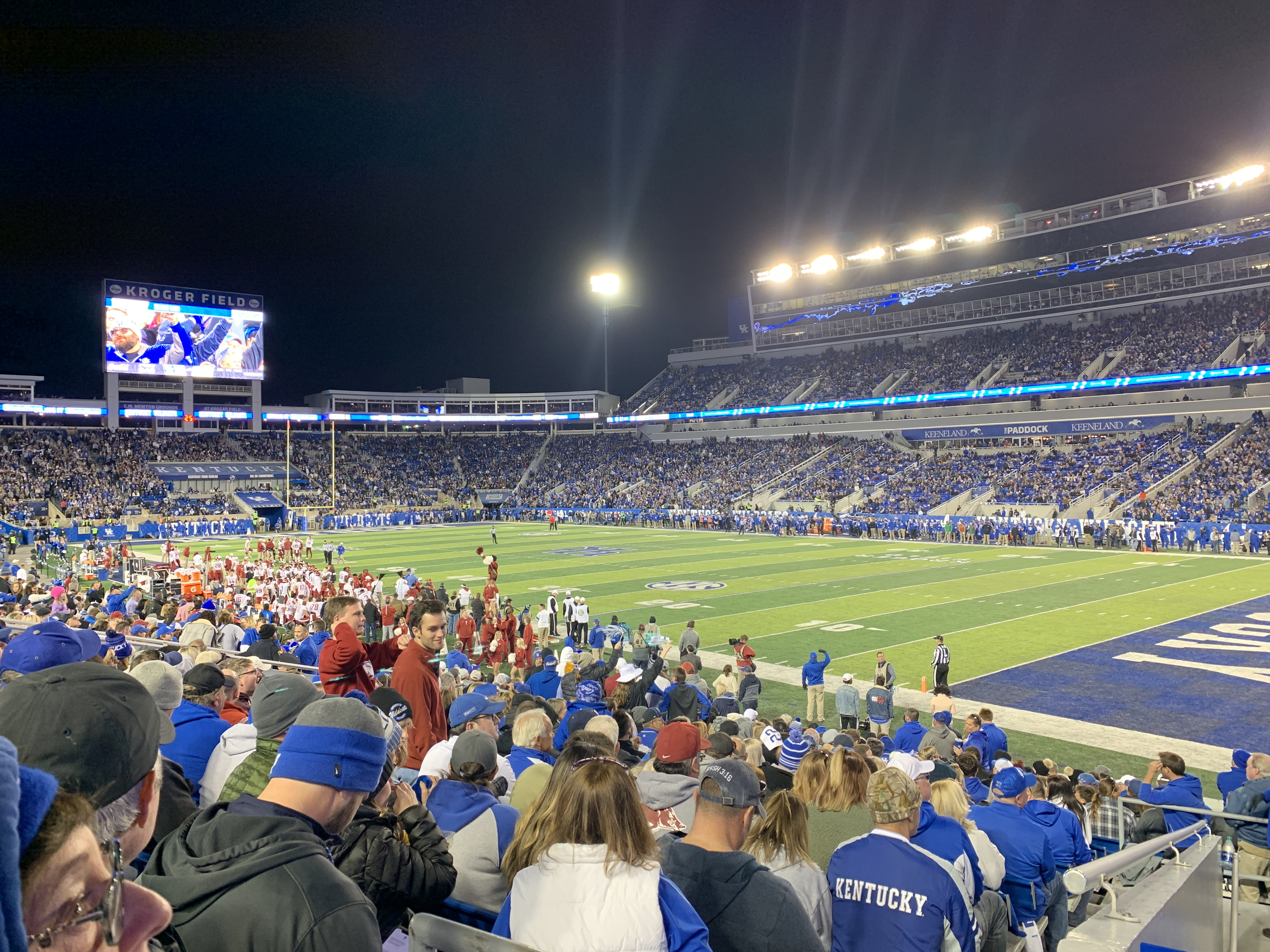
Kroger Field during Kentucky's win over Arkansas

	1	2	3	4	Total
Razorbacks	7	6	0	7	20
Wildcats	0	7	10	7	24

=== At Georgia ===
	1	2	3	4	Total
Wildcats	0	0	0	0	0
No. 10 Bulldogs	0	0	14	7	21

=== Missouri ===
	1	2	3	4	Total
Tigers	0	0	7	0	7
Wildcats	0	22	0	7	29

=== Tennessee ===
	1	2	3	4	Total
Volunteers	0	3	14	0	17
Wildcats	13	0	0	0	13

=== At Vanderbilt ===
	1	2	3	4	Total
Wildcats	3	21	14	0	38
Commodores	14	0	0	0	14

=== UT Martin ===
	1	2	3	4	Total
Skyhawks	0	0	0	7	7
Wildcats	16	13	7	14	50

=== Louisville ===
	1	2	3	4	Total
Cardinals	6	7	0	0	13
Wildcats	7	10	14	14	45

=== Vs. Virginia Tech (Belk Bowl) ===
	1	2	3	4	Total
Hokies	10	7	10	3	30
Wildcats	7	7	10	13	37

== Personnel ==
=== Coaching staff ===
Name	Position
Mark Stoops	Head coach
Eddie Gran	Offensive coordinator/Associate head coach, RB Coach
Darin Hinshaw	Co-offensive coordinator, Quarterbacks coach
Brad White	Defensive coordinator/Outside linebackers coach
Dean Hood	Special teams coordinator/Defensive backs Coach
Vince Marrow	Tight ends coach/recruiting coordinator
Steve Clinkscale	Secondary Coach
John Schlarman	Offensive line coach
Derrick LeBlanc	Defensive line coach
Jon Sumrall	Inside linebackers coach
Michael Smith	Wide receivers coach

== Roster ==
2019 Kentucky Wildcats football team roster
Players
Coaches
Offense

Pos.	#	Name	Class
[[American football positions|]]
[[American football positions|]]

Defense

Pos.	#	Name	Class
[[American football positions|]]

Special teams

Pos.	#	Name	Class

Head coach

- Mark Stoops

Coordinators/assistant coaches

Legend

- (C) Team captain
- (S) Suspended
- (I) Ineligible
- Injured
- Redshirt

== Players drafted into the NFL ==
Kentucky had two players selected in the 2020 NFL draft.

Round	Pick	Player	Position	NFL Club
3	80	Lynn Bowden	WR	Las Vegas Raiders
4	121	Logan Stenberg	OG	Detroit Lions
