= Jeff Chandler (American football) =

American football player (born 1979)

No. 3, 5
- Position: Placekicker

Personal information
- Born: June 18, 1979 (age 47); Jacksonville, Florida, U.S.
- Listed height: 6 ft 2 in (1.88 m)
- Listed weight: 218 lb (99 kg)

Career information
- High school: Mandarin (Jacksonville)
- College: Florida
- NFL draft: 2002: 4th round, 102nd overall pick

Career history
- San Francisco 49ers (2002–2003); Jacksonville Jaguars (2004)*; St. Louis Rams (2004); Carolina Panthers (2004); Washington Redskins (2004); Miami Dolphins (2005)*; Cleveland Browns (2006)*
- * Offseason or practice squad member only

Awards and highlights
- Second-team All-American (1999); 2× First-team All-SEC (1999, 2001); Second-team All-SEC (2000)

Career NFL statistics
- Field goal attempts: 27
- Field goals: 19
- Extra point attempts: 36
- Extra points: 35
- Stats at Pro Football Reference

Jeffrey Robin Chandler (born June 18, 1979) is an American former professional football player who was a placekicker for three seasons in the National Football League (NFL) during the early 2000s. Chandler played college football for the Florida Gators, becoming their all-time leading scorer with 368 points. Thereafter, he played in the NFL for the San Francisco 49ers, Carolina Panthers and Washington Redskins.

== Early life ==
Chandler was born in Jacksonville, Florida. He attended Mandarin High School in Jacksonville, where he played kicker and wide receiver for the Mandarin Mustangs high school football team. Chandler was also a standout letterman in soccer and tennis.

== College career ==
Chandler attended the University of Florida in Gainesville, Florida, where he joined coach Steve Spurrier's Florida Gators football program as a walk-on in 1997, kicking one extra point and later being granted a redshirt for the remainder of the 1997 season. He subsequently played for the Gators from 1998 to 2001, and was rewarded with an athletic scholarship after the 1998 season. He successfully completed sixty-seven of eighty field goal attempts in his career, and 167 of 180 attempted extra points after touchdowns (PATs).

Chandler was the Gators' all-time career leader in field goals completed, first in PATs made, and second in field goal percentage (83.8 percent). He ranks second in Southeastern Conference (SEC) history in scoring with 368 points, fourth in league history in field goals made and second in field goal percentage. He kicked his career long field goal of fifty-four yards in the Gators' 34–23 victory of the rival Georgia Bulldogs on October 28, 2000.

Chandler was a semifinalist for the Lou Groza Award honoring the nation's top collegiate placekicker in 1999 and 2000; was a second-team All-American in 1999; a first-team All-SEC selection in 1999 and 2001; and was chosen by his teammates as the Gators' most valuable player for the 1999 season. He graduated from the University of Florida with a bachelor's degree in telecommunications in December 2001.

== Professional career ==
The San Francisco 49ers chose Chandler in the fourth round (102nd pick overall) of the 2002 NFL draft, and he played for the 49ers from 2002 to 2003. Chandler was released by the 49ers after the 2003 season, and he appeared on the regular season roster of two different teams in 2004: the Carolina Panthers and the Washington Redskins. He played in thirteen games during his four-year NFL career, kicking nineteen field goals on twenty-seven attempts (70.4 percent), with a career long of forty-nine yards.

== See also ==
- Florida Gators
- Florida Gators football, 1990–99
- List of Carolina Panthers players
- List of Florida Gators football All-Americans
- List of Florida Gators in the NFL draft
- List of University of Florida alumni
- List of Washington Redskins players
