= Derrick LeBlanc =

American football coach (born 1981)

Jacksonville Jaguars
- Title: Assistant defensive line coach

Personal information
- Born: May 6, 1974 (age 52); Breaux Bridge, Louisiana, U.S.

Career information
- Position: Lineman
- College: Northwestern State (1992–1996)

Career history
- LSU (2000) Graduate assistant; Henderson State (2001–2004) Defensive line/strength and conditioning coordinator; Arkansas Tech (2005) Defensive line/academic coordinator; Missouri State (2006–2007) Defensive line coach; LSU (2008–2011) Assistant strength and conditioning coordinator; Wyoming (2012) Defensive line coach; Southern Mississippi (2013–2014) Defensive line coach; Pearl River Community College (2015) Defensive coordinator/defensive line coach; North Texas (2016) Defensive line coach; Kentucky (2017–2019) Defensive line coach; Arkansas (2020) Defensive line coach; Miami Dolphins (2022) Assistant defensive line coach; Arizona Cardinals (2023–2024) Defensive line coach; Jacksonville Jaguars (2025–present) Assistant defensive line coach

Derrick LeBlanc (pronounced luh-BLON, with a silent "c") is an American professional football coach who is the assistant defensive line coach for the Jacksonville Jaguars of the National Football League (NFL). He previously served as the defensive line coach for the Arizona Cardinals from 2023 to 2024.

Leblanc played college football at Northwestern State and previously served as an assistant coach for the Arizona Cardinals and Miami Dolphins.

== Early life and playing career ==
LeBlanc was born and raised in Breaux Bridge, Louisiana, where he attended Breaux Bridge High School. His coaching career began at the same school, but his athletic journey began as a player. LeBlanc played four seasons of college football at Northwestern State University from 1992 to 1996, where he contributed as both an offensive and defensive lineman. He earned Southland Conference All-Academic team honors during his junior and senior years. LeBlanc graduated from Northwestern State with a degree in Business Administration.

== Coaching career ==
=== Early career ===
LeBlanc began his coaching career at the high school level, serving as both an offensive and defensive line coach at his alma mater, Breaux Bridge High School. His collegiate coaching journey started as a graduate assistant at Louisiana State University (LSU) in 2000.

LeBlanc went on to coach at various universities and gained recognition for developing strong defensive line units. His coaching career includes stints at Henderson State (2001–04), Arkansas Tech (2005), Missouri State (2006–07), and Wyoming (2012). He also served as an assistant strength and conditioning coordinator at LSU from 2008 to 2011, during which LSU won the SEC Championship and appeared in the BCS National Championship game.

LeBlanc also made an impact at Southern Mississippi (2013–14), where he coached future NFL defensive tackles Khyri Thornton and Rakeem Nuñez-Roches. In 2015, he served as the defensive coordinator and defensive line coach at Pearl River Community College before moving on to North Texas in 2016, where his defensive line helped improve the team's defensive statistics.

=== Kentucky ===
From 2017 to 2019, LeBlanc was the defensive line coach at the University of Kentucky, where he helped the Wildcats achieve three consecutive bowl appearances. His work at Kentucky produced two 2021 NFL Draft picks, Quinton Bohanna and Phil Hoskins.

=== Arkansas ===
LeBlanc then coached at the University of Arkansas in 2020, where he mentored defensive tackle Jonathan Marshall, who was selected in the 2021 NFL draft.

LeBlanc's first NFL coaching experience came with the Chicago Bears in 2004 as part of the Bill Walsh Diversity Coaching Fellowship.

=== Miami Dolphins ===
In 2022, LeBlanc joined the Miami Dolphins as the assistant defensive line coach. where he played a role in helping the Dolphins finish 4th in the NFL in rushing defense (103.0 yards per game). LeBlanc also helped Dolphins defensive tackles Christian Wilkins and Zach Sieler achieve career-best seasons.

=== Arizona Cardinals ===
On February 23, 2023, LeBlanc was hired by the Arizona Cardinals as their defensive line coach. On January 28, 2025, it was announced that LeBlanc and the Cardinals would be parting ways.

=== Jacksonville Jaguars ===
In 2025, LeBlanc was hired by the Jacksonville Jaguars as their assistant defensive line coach under head coach Liam Coen.

== Personal life ==
Derrick LeBlanc earned a master's degree in Sports Administration from LSU. He is married to Niema LeBlanc, and they have three children: two sons, Dayton and Derrick, and a daughter, Kennedy
