= Mike Scurlock =

American football player and coach (born 1972)

No. 22, 37, 38
- Position: Safety

Personal information
- Born: February 26, 1972 (age 54); Tucson, Arizona, U.S.
- Listed height: 5 ft 10 in (1.78 m)
- Listed weight: 200 lb (91 kg)

Career information
- High school: Sunnyside (Tucson)
- College: Arizona
- NFL draft: 1995: 5th round, 140th overall pick

Career history
- St. Louis Rams (1995–1998); Carolina Panthers (1999)

Career NFL statistics
- Tackles: 26
- Interceptions: 1
- Fumble recoveries: 2
- Stats at Pro Football Reference

Michael Lee Scurlock Jr. (born February 26, 1972) is an American former professional football player and coach. He played professionally in the National Football League (NFL) with the St. Louis Rams from 1995 to 1998 and the Carolina Panthers in 1999.

== Early life ==
Born in Tucson, Arizona, Scurlock attended Sunnyside High School and later transferred to Cholla High School. He played college football at the University of Arizona, where he graduated with a B.A. in media arts.

Scurlock, nicknamed "Scurry," had 67 tackles as a freshman after redshirt year. In his sophomore year, he had nine tackles versus UCLA. He played seven games at nickelback his junior year and was Super Sleeper choice by Poor Man's Guide to the NFL draft as a senior. He was All-Arizona at running back. He lettered four times each in football and track.

== Professional career ==
In the 1995 NFL draft, the Arizona standout was selected by the St. Louis Rams in the fifth round (140th pick overall). He went to the Carolina Panthers in 1999. After five seasons in the NFL, he retired on January 2, 2000.

== See also ==
- List of St. Louis Rams players
- List of Carolina Panthers players
