= Lynn Bowden =

American football player (born 1997)

Lynn Bowden Jr.
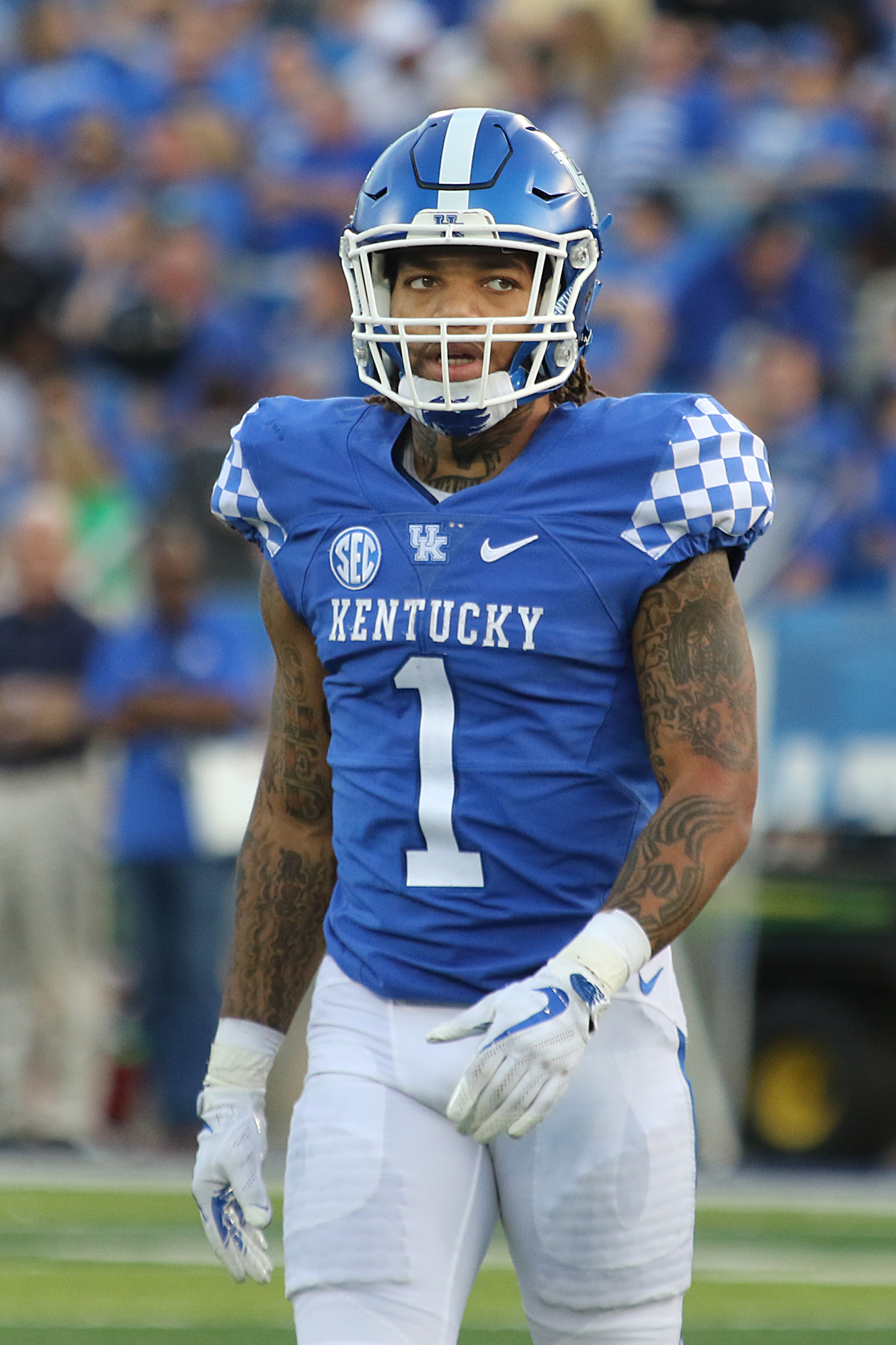
- Bowden at the 2018 Blue-White Spring Scrimmage

Washington Wolfpack
- Position: Quarterback
- Roster status: Active

Personal information
- Born: October 14, 1997 (age 29); Youngstown, Ohio, U.S.
- Listed height: 5 ft 11 in (1.80 m)
- Listed weight: 204 lb (93 kg)

Career information
- High school: Warren G. Harding (Warren, Ohio)
- College: Kentucky (2017–2019)
- NFL draft: 2020: 3rd round, 80th overall pick

Career history
- Las Vegas Raiders (2020)*; Miami Dolphins (2020–2022); New England Patriots (2022)*; New Orleans Saints (2023); DC Defenders (2025)*; BC Lions (2025)*; Louisville Kings (2026)*; Washington Wolfpack (2027)
- * Offseason or practice squad member only

Awards and highlights
- Paul Hornung Award (2019); Consensus All-American (2019); First-team All-SEC (2019); Second-team All-SEC (2018)

Career NFL statistics
- Receptions: 39
- Receiving yards: 294
- Stats at Pro Football Reference

Lynn Bowden Jr. (born October 14, 1997) is an American professional football quarterback and wide receiver. He played college football for the Kentucky Wildcats where he was the team's starting quarterback for seven games as a junior and was selected by the Las Vegas Raiders in the third round of the 2020 NFL draft. He has played in the NFL for the Miami Dolphins, New England Patriots, and New Orleans Saints.

== Early life ==
Bowden grew up in Youngstown, Ohio, and originally attended Liberty High School. He played running back during his freshman year before becoming the Leopards starting quarterback as a sophomore and was named first-team OHSAA Division V All-State after passing for 761 yards with 13 touchdowns and four interceptions and rushing for 1,782 yards. Bowden transferred to Warren G. Harding High School going into his junior year as a quarterback and punter after his family moved to Warren, Ohio. As a senior, Bowden passed for 1,366 yards and rushed for 2,277 yards and scored a combined 57 touchdowns and was named the OHSAA Division II Offensive Player of the Year and was the runner-up for Ohio's Mr. Football Award. Bowden was rated a four star prospect by Scout.com, Rivals.com and 247Sports. He initially committed to play college football for the Indiana Hoosiers, but de-committed before deciding to play at the University of Kentucky over offers from Penn State, Michigan State, Michigan, Nebraska and Wisconsin. Bowden stuck to his commitment to Kentucky despite a late offer from Ohio State. He finished his high school career as the sixth-leading rusher in Ohio high school history with 7,387 yards and 10th with 91 rushing touchdowns. Bowden also played basketball at Harding, averaging 24 points, six rebounds and seven assists and playing in the Ohio-Kentucky All-Star game as a senior.

== College career ==
As a true freshman, Bowden moved to wide receiver and caught 17 passes for 210 yards and served as the Wildcats' primary kick returner and was named to the Freshman All-Southeastern Conference (SEC) team as a return specialist. Bowden was also used at quarterback in the Wildcat formation, rushing for 37 yards on 12 attempts and also completed three of four passing attempts for 92 yards with the lone incompletion being an interception. Bowden entered his sophomore season on the Paul Hornung Award watchlist. He finished the season with 67 catches for 745 yards and five touchdowns, all highest on the team, while also returning five punts for 146 yards and two touchdowns and 27 kicks for 539 yards and was named second-team All-SEC as an All-Purpose Performer by the conference's coaches. Against Missouri, Bowden scored a 67-yard touchdown on the first punt return of his career while also catching 13 passes for 166 yards and was named the SEC Special Teams Player of the Week.

Bowden entered his junior season on the Hornung and Fred Biletnikoff Award watchlists and second-team preseason All-SEC. After the first four games of the season, Bowden was made the Wildcats starting quarterback after injuries to Kentucky's first and second-string quarterbacks. In his first start against Arkansas, Bowden led Kentucky to a 24–20 win after completing seven of 11 passes for 78 yards and a touchdown along with 24 carries for 196 yards and two touchdowns and was named the SEC Co-Offensive player of the Week and the Manning Award Quarterback of the Week. He was named a first-team midseason All-American by the Associated Press. Bowden set the SEC record for rushing yards by a quarterback in a single game when he rushed for 284 yards and four touchdowns against rival Louisville in the final game of the regular season and was again named the SEC Offensive Player of the Week and the Manning Award Quarterback of the Week. Bowden finished the regular season with 1,235 rushing yards and 11 touchdowns, 330 yards passing and two touchdowns, 200 kickoff return yards and caught 30 passes for 348 yards while the Wildcats went 5–2 in games he started at quarterback and was named first-team All-SEC as an all-purpose performer and was selected as the recipient of the 2019 Paul Hornung Award. He was named a consensus first-team All-American after being selected by the American Football Coaches Association, AP and the Sporting News. Bowden was also named first-team All-America by Sports Illustrated, CBS Sports, USA Today and The Athletic. Bowden announced that he would enter the 2020 NFL draft after playing in Kentucky's bowl game, forgoing his senior season. Bowden was named the MVP of the 2019 Belk Bowl after rushing for 233 yards on 34 carries and completing six of twelve pass attempts for 73 yards, an interception, and throwing a game-winning touchdown pass with 15 seconds left.

=== Statistics ===
Legend
Led NCAA Division I FBS

Season	Team	Games (Note: Accounts for only GS as a QB)			Passing								Rushing			
Season	Team	GP	GS	Record	Cmp	Att	Pct	Yds	Y/A	TD	Int	Rtg	Att	Yds	Avg	TD
2017	Kentucky	13	0	—	3	4	75.0	92	23.0	0	1	218.2	12	37	3.1	0
2018	Kentucky	13	12	—	0	1	0.0	0	0.0	0	1	-200.0	9	25	2.8	0
2019	Kentucky	13	13	6–2	35	74	47.3	403	5.4	3	3	98.3	185	1,468	7.9	13
Career		39	25	6–2	38	79	48.1	495	6.3	3	5	100.6	206	1,530	7.4	13

Year	Team	Receiving				Kick returns				Punt returns			
Year	Team	Rec	Yds	Avg	TD	Ret	Yds	Avg	TD	Ret	Yds	Avg	TD
2017	Kentucky	17	210	12.4	0	37	869	23.5	0	0	0	0.0	0
2018	Kentucky	67	745	11.1	5	25	539	21.6	0	5	146	29.2	2
2019	Kentucky	30	348	11.6	1	9	220	24.4	0	4	53	13.3	0
Career		114	1,303	11.4	6	71	1,628	22.9	0	9	199	22.1	2

== Professional career ==
Pre-draft measurables
Height	Weight	Arm length	Hand span	Wingspan	Bench press
5 ft 10 5/8 in (1.79 m)	204 lb (93 kg)	30 7/8 in (0.78 m)	9 3/4 in (0.25 m)	6 ft 2 in (1.88 m)	13 reps
All values from NFL Combine

=== Las Vegas Raiders ===
Bowden was selected by the Las Vegas Raiders in the third round with the 80th overall pick of the 2020 NFL Draft. He was officially drafted at the running back position by the Raiders with the intention of using him as a "utility player" on offense.

=== Miami Dolphins ===
On September 5, 2020, Bowden was traded along with a 2021 sixth round pick to the Miami Dolphins for the Raiders' original fourth round pick that was previously traded to Miami for Raekwon McMillan. Bowden made his NFL debut on September 20, 2020, against the Buffalo Bills, catching one pass for a loss of one yard. He was placed on the reserve/COVID-19 list by the team on November 6, 2020, and activated on November 12. Bowden saw his first significant action in Week 14 against the Kansas City Chiefs, catching seven passes for 82 yards after catching four passes for 41 yards the week prior against the Cincinnati Bengals.

On August 24, 2021, Bowden was placed on injured reserve. On August 30, 2022, he was waived by the Dolphins.

=== New England Patriots ===
On September 1, 2022, Bowden was signed to the practice squad of the New England Patriots. He signed a reserve/futures contract with the team on January 31, 2023. He was waived on May 10, 2023.

=== New Orleans Saints ===
On June 15, 2023, Bowden signed with the New Orleans Saints. He was waived on August 29, 2023, and re-signed to the practice squad. On September 13, 2023, Bowden was signed to the active roster.

=== DC Defenders ===
On December 31, 2024, Bowden signed with the DC Defenders of the United Football League (UFL). He was released on March 20, 2025.

=== BC Lions ===
On March 27, 2025, Bowden signed with the BC Lions of the Canadian Football League (CFL). He was released on May 28, 2025.

=== Louisville Kings ===
On January 14, 2026, Bowden was selected in the second round to the Louisville Kings in the United Football League (UFL) Draft. He was released on March 10.

=== Washington Wolfpack ===
On September 24, 2026, Bowden signed to play quarterback with the Washington Wolfpack of Arena Football One.

== NFL career statistics ==
Legend
**Bold**	Career best

=== Regular season ===
Year	Team	Games		Receiving					Rushing					Returning					Fumbles	
Year	Team	GP	GS	Rec	Yds	Avg	Lng	TD	Att	Yds	Avg	Lng	TD	Ret	Yds	Avg	Lng	TD	Fum	Lost
2020	MIA	10	**4**	**28**	**211**	**7.5**	**22**	0	**9**	**32**	3.6	11	0	0	0	0.0	0	0	0	0
2021	MIA	DNP																		
2022	NE	1	0	0	0	0.0	0	0	0	0	0.0	0	0	0	0	0.0	0	0	0	0
2023	NO	**15**	3	11	83	**7.5**	17	0	5	**32**	**6.4**	**29**	0	**10**	**117**	**11.7**	**28**	0	**1**	0
Career		26	7	39	294	7.5	22	0	14	64	4,6	29	0	10	117	11.7	28	0	1	0

== Personal life ==
Bowden has a son and daughter. His cousin Derek Culver played basketball at West Virginia and formerly played for the NBA G League teams Fort Wayne Mad Ants, Wisconsin Herd, and Delaware Blue Coats. Bowden has over 70 tattoos.Between the Louisville Kings and Washington Wolfpack, he was a standout industrial athlete at Toyota Motor Manufacturing Kentucky.
