= Josh Ali =

American football player (born 1999)

Profile
- Position: Wide receiver

Personal information
- Born: March 3, 1999 (age 27); Miami, Florida, U.S.
- Listed height: 6 ft 0 in (1.83 m)
- Listed weight: 200 lb (91 kg)

Career information
- High school: Chaminade-Madonna (FL)
- College: Kentucky
- NFL draft: 2022: undrafted

Career history
- Atlanta Falcons (2022–2023); Calgary Stampeders (2025)*; Saskatchewan Roughriders (2025)*
- * Offseason or practice squad member only

Career NFL statistics
- Games played: 2
- Stats at Pro Football Reference
- Stats at CFL.ca

Josh Ali (born March 3, 1999) is an American professional football wide receiver. He played college football at Kentucky and was signed by the Atlanta Falcons as an undrafted free agent in 2022.

== Early life and education ==
Ali was born on March 3, 1999, in Miami, Florida. He attended Chaminade-Madonna College Preparatory School and was a four-year starter in football, recording as a senior 43 receptions for 805 yards and five touchdowns. An all-state selection, Ali was a three-star recruit and elected to play college football at Kentucky over offers from UCF and Utah, as well as several other schools.

As a true freshman at Kentucky in 2017, Ali appeared in nine games and recorded five receptions for 25 yards. The following season, he caught 10 passes for 115 yards and scored his first collegiate touchdown. As a junior, Ali started 13 games and recorded 23 catches for 233 yards and three touchdowns. That season, he played a key role in the Wildcats' victory in the Belk Bowl, making a crucial fourth down reception and later scoring the game-winning touchdown with 15 seconds to play.

In the 2020 season, Ali appeared in 11 games and recorded 473 receiving yards and a touchdown off of 54 receptions. After being given an extra year of eligibility due to the COVID-19 pandemic, he opted to return to the team in 2021 for a fifth season. That year, he posted 601 receiving yards and three touchdowns on 41 catches while appearing in 10 games. Ali missed the final game of the season, the Citrus Bowl, after being involved in a car accident.

== Professional career ==
Pre-draft measurables
| Height | Weight | Arm length | Hand span |
|---|---|---|---|
| 5 ft 11 3/8 in (1.81 m) | 191 lb (87 kg) | 31 in (0.79 m) | 8 3/8 in (0.21 m) |
All values from Pro Day

=== Atlanta Falcons ===
After going unselected in the 2022 NFL draft, Ali was invited to the rookie minicamp of the Atlanta Falcons, but was not initially signed. He received a tryout on August 25, and six days later was signed to the practice squad. Ali was elevated to the active roster for the Falcons' Week 17 game with the Arizona Cardinals, and made his NFL debut in the game. He signed a reserve/future contract on January 9, 2023.

Ali made the team's final roster in 2023. He was placed on injured reserve on October 4, 2023.

On August 25, 2024, Ali was waived by the Falcons.

=== Calgary Stampeders ===
On February 19, 2025, Ali signed with the Calgary Stampeders of the Canadian Football League (CFL).

=== Saskatchewan Roughriders ===
On June 23, 2025, Ali was signed to the practice roster of the CFL's Saskatchewan Roughriders. He was released on September 9, 2025.

== Personal life ==
Ali's father, Faheem, played college football at Louisiana Tech and later was in the Arena Football League (AFL). Ali began writing a children's book series in 2021.
