= 2019 Belk Bowl =

Postseason college football bowl game

- 18th Belk Bowl
Virginia Tech Hokies	Kentucky Wildcats
(8–4)	(7–5)
ACC	SEC
30	37
Head coach: Justin Fuente	Head coach: Mark Stoops
	1	2	3	4	Total
Virginia Tech	10	7	10	3	30
Kentucky	7	7	10	13	37
- Date: December 31, 2019
- Season: 2019
- Stadium: Bank of America Stadium
- Location: Charlotte, North Carolina
- MVP: Lynn Bowden (QB, Kentucky)
- Favorite: Virginia Tech by 1.5
- Referee: David Alvarez (Big 12)
- Attendance: 44,138
- Payout: US$4,780,461

United States TV coverage
- Network: ESPN & ESPN Radio
- Announcers: ESPN: Beth Mowins (play-by-play), Anthony Becht (analyst) and Rocky Boiman (sideline); ESPN Radio: Chris Cotter (play-by-play), Mark Herzlich (analyst) and Kelsey Riggs (sideline)

The 2019 Belk Bowl was a college football bowl game played on December 31, 2019, with kickoff at 12:00 p.m. EST on ESPN. It was the 18th edition of the Belk Bowl, and was one of the 2019–20 bowl games concluding the 2019 FBS football season. The game was sponsored by department store chain Belk.

== Teams ==
The game was played between the Virginia Tech Hokies from the Atlantic Coast Conference (ACC) and the Kentucky Wildcats from the Southeastern Conference (SEC). This was the 20th meeting between the programs; Kentucky entered the game leading the all-time series, 11–6–2.

=== Virginia Tech Hokies ===
Virginia Tech entered the bowl with an 8–4 record (5–3 in conference). They finished second in the ACC's Coastal Division. The Hokies were 1–1 against ranked FBS teams, defeating Wake Forest and losing to Notre Dame. This was Virginia Tech's second Belk Bowl; their 2016 team won that season's Belk Bowl over Arkansas, 35–24.

=== Kentucky Wildcats ===
Kentucky entered the bowl with a 7–5 record (3–5 in conference). They finished in the three-way tie for fourth place in the SEC's East Division. The Wildcats lost to both ranked FBS teams that they played, Florida and Georgia. This was Kentucky's first appearance in the Belk Bowl.

== Game summary ==
2019 Belk Bowl

Quarter	1	2	3	4	Total
Virginia Tech	10	7	10	3	30
Kentucky	7	7	10	13	37

at Bank of America Stadium • Charlotte, North Carolina

- Date: Tuesday, December 31, 2019
- Game time: 12:00 p.m. EST
- Game weather: Sunny • Temperature: 52 °F (11 °C) • Wind: SW 9 mph
- Game attendance: 44,138
- Referee: David Alvarez
- TV announcers (ESPN): Beth Mowins (play-by-play), Anthony Becht (analyst) and Rocky Boiman (sideline)
- ESPN game summary

Game information

First Quarter

- (11:15) VT – Brian Johnson 54 yard field goal (Drive: 10 plays, 39 yards, 3:45; Virginia Tech 3–0)
- (4:20) UK – Lynn Bowden 25 yard rush, Matt Ruffolo kick (Drive: 12 plays, 80 yards, 6:55; Kentucky 7–3)
- (2:04) VT – Hendon Hooker 18 yard pass to Damon Hazelton, Brian Johnson kick (Drive: 5 plays, 75 yards, 2:16; Virginia Tech 10–7)

Second Quarter

- (10:20) VT – Hendon Hooker 6 yard pass to Dalton Keene, Brian Johnson kick (Drive: 9 plays, 60 yards, 4:40; Virginia Tech 17–7)
- (0:53) UK – Chris Rodruiguez Jr. 2 yard rush, Matt Ruffolo kick (Drive: 8 plays, 64 yards, 4:09; Virginia Tech 17–14)

Third Quarter

- (11:29) UK – Matt Ruffolo 40 yard field goal (Drive: 7 plays, 43 yards, 3:31; Tied 17–17)
- (9:57) VT – Deshawn McClease 43 yard rush, Brian Johnson kick (Drive: 4 plays, 76 yards, 1:26; Virginia Tech 24–17)
- (7:57) UK – Lynn Bowden 61 yard rush, Matt Ruffolo kick (Drive: 5 plays, 75 yards, 2:00; Tied 24–24)
- (3:13) VT – Brian Johnson 40 yard field goal (Drive: 12 plays, 53 yards, 4:44; Virginia Tech 27–24)

Fourth Quarter

- (12:47) VT – Brian Johnson 27 yard field goal (Drive: 6 plays, 30 yards, 2:46; Virginia Tech 30–24)
- (0:15) UK – Lynn Bowden 13 yard pass to Josh Ali, Matt Ruffolo kick (Drive: 18 plays, 85 yards, 8:10; Kentucky 31–30)
- (0:00) UK – Jordan Wright 28 yard fumble return (Kentucky 37–30)

=== Statistics ===
Statistics	VT	UK
First downs	20	22
Plays–yards	55–329	68–404
Rushes–yards	33–219	55–331
Passing yards	110	73
Passing: comp–att–int	12–22–0	6–13–1
Time of possession	24:14	35:46

Team	Category	Player	Statistics
Virginia Tech	Passing	Hendon Hooker	12/22, 110 yards, 2 TD
Virginia Tech	Rushing	Deshawn McClease	11 carries, 126 yards, 1 TD
Virginia Tech	Receiving	James Mitchell	3 receptions, 36 yards
Kentucky	Passing	Lynn Bowden	6/12, 73 yards, 1 TD, 1 INT
Kentucky	Rushing	Lynn Bowden	34 carries, 233 yards, 2 TD
Kentucky	Receiving	Josh Ali	4 receptions, 52 yards, 1 TD
