= George Asafo-Adjei =

American football player (born 1997)

No. 78
- Position: Offensive tackle

Personal information
- Born: January 12, 1997 (age 29); Bronx, New York, U.S.
- Listed height: 6 ft 5 in (1.96 m)
- Listed weight: 315 lb (143 kg)

Career information
- High school: Lakota West (West Chester, Ohio)
- College: Kentucky
- NFL draft: 2019: 7th round, 232nd overall pick

Career history
- New York Giants (2019)
- Stats at Pro Football Reference

George Asafo-Adjei (born January 12, 1997) is an American former professional football player who was an offensive tackle in the National Football League (NFL). He played college football for the Kentucky Wildcats.

== Professional career ==
Asafo-Adjei was selected by the New York Giants in the seventh round, 232nd overall, of the 2019 NFL draft. He was placed on injured reserve on August 31, 2019, with a concussion. He was waived on March 12, 2020, following a failed physical.
