= Brenden Bates =

American football player (born 1999)

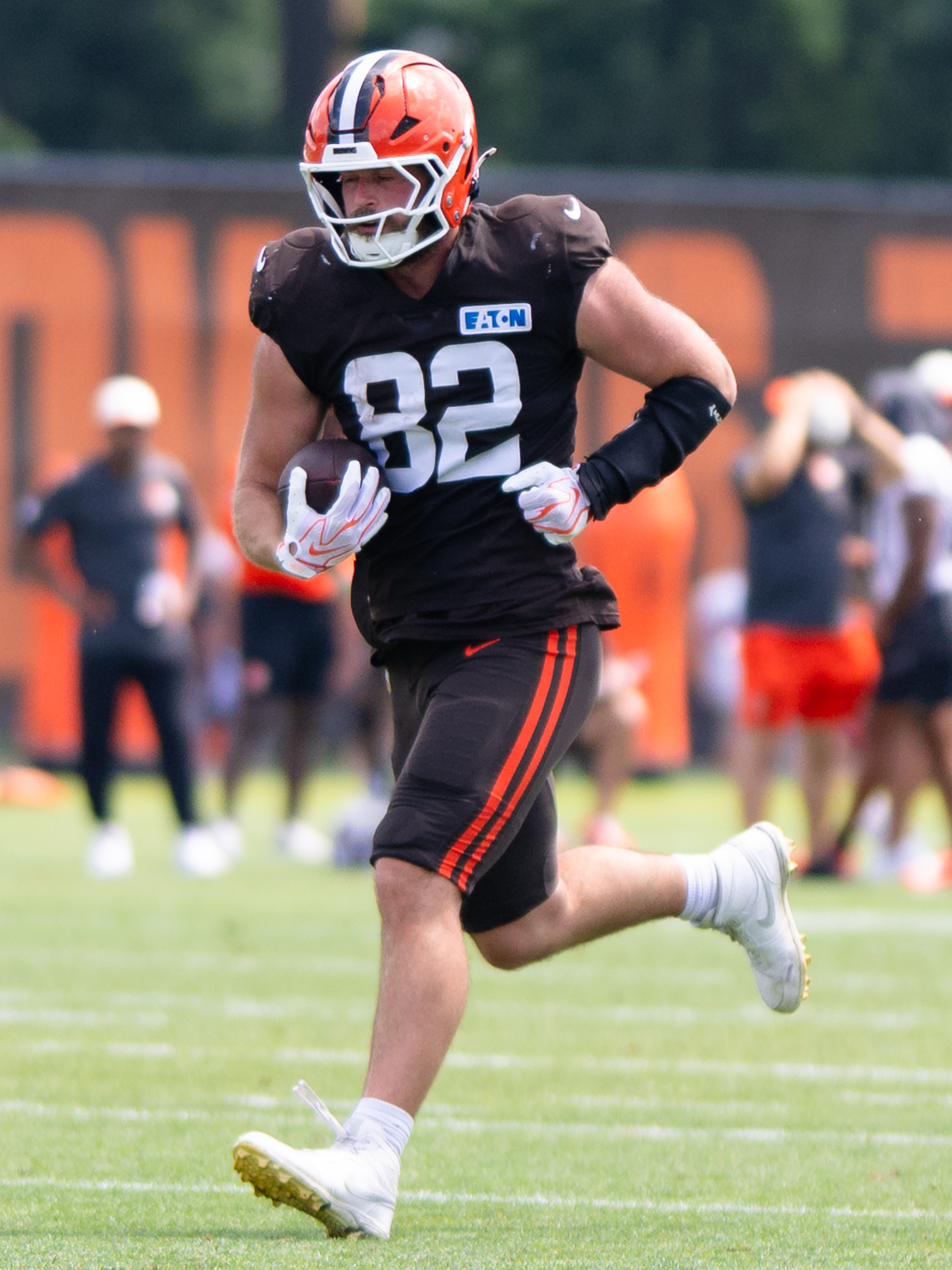
- Bates with the Cleveland Browns in 2026

No. 83 – Jacksonville Jaguars
- Position: Tight end
- Roster status: Practice squad

Personal information
- Born: October 17, 1999 (age 27); Cincinnati, Ohio, U.S.
- Listed height: 6 ft 5 in (1.96 m)
- Listed weight: 255 lb (116 kg)

Career information
- High school: Moeller (Cincinnati)
- College: Kentucky (2018–2023)
- NFL draft: 2024: undrafted

Career history
- Chicago Bears (2024)*; New York Jets (2024); Cleveland Browns (2024–2025); Houston Texans (2025); Cleveland Browns (2025); Jacksonville Jaguars (2026–present)*
- * Offseason or practice squad member only

Career NFL statistics as of 2025
- Receptions: 4
- Receiving yards: 48
- Stats at Pro Football Reference

Brenden Bates (born October 17, 1999) is an American professional football tight end for the Jacksonville Jaguars of the National Football League (NFL). He played college football for the Kentucky Wildcats and was signed by the Chicago Bears as an undrafted free agent in 2024.

== Early life ==
Bates was born on October 17, 1999, in Cincinnati, Ohio. Both his parents, his two siblings, and his grandfather each played collegiate sports. He attended Moeller High School in Cincinnati where he played football, basketball, and competed in track and field. In football, he was twice named first-team All-Greater Catholic League and had 17 receptions for 305 yards and 11 touchdowns as a senior.

Bates was selected for the national team at the International Bowl. He was ranked a four-star recruit and one of the top tight ends nationally. In addition to his pass catching abilities, he was also considered a top blocker; he told the Lexington Herald-Leader that "I take pride in blocking. I just love moving people against their will." He committed to play college football for the Kentucky Wildcats.

== College career ==
As a true freshman at Kentucky in 2018, Bates redshirted, appearing in two games. The following season, he appeared in 13 games on the special teams unit. He played in only six games in 2020 due to injury, making his first career catch that year. In 2021, he was a starter in six games and totaled 11 catches for 70 yards, including his first collegiate touchdown. He recorded 10 receptions for 99 yards and one touchdown during the 2022 season. He returned for a final season in 2023, as all players were given an extra year of eligibility due to the COVID-19 pandemic. In his final year, he caught four passes for 89 yards. He finished his collegiate career having recorded 26 catches for 272 yards and two touchdowns, while having started 25 of the 58 games in which he appeared. He was invited to the 2024 Hula Bowl all-star game.

== Professional career ==
Pre-draft measurables
Height	Weight	Arm length	Hand span	Wingspan	40-yard dash	10-yard split	20-yard split	20-yard shuttle	Three-cone drill	Vertical jump	Broad jump	Bench press
6 ft 4 3/8 in (1.94 m)	246 lb (112 kg)	33 in (0.84 m)	9 in (0.23 m)	6 ft 5 in (1.96 m)	4.68 s	1.70 s	2.82 s	4.47 s	7.10 s	33.5 in (0.85 m)	10 ft 2 in (3.10 m)	21 reps
All values from Pro Day

=== Chicago Bears ===
On May 9, 2024, after going unselected in the 2024 NFL draft, Bates signed with the Chicago Bears as an undrafted free agent. He was a standout performer in the preseason, catching six passes for 100 yards. On August 27, he was waived by the Bears as part of final roster cuts.

=== New York Jets ===
On August 28, 2024, Bates was claimed off waivers by the New York Jets. On October 17, he was released by the Jets and re-signed to the practice squad two days later.

=== Cleveland Browns (first stint) ===
On December 18, 2024, Bates was signed off the Jets' practice squad to the Cleveland Browns' active roster after Nick Chubb was placed on injured reserve.

On August 26, 2025, Bates was named to the initial 53-man roster. On August 27, he was waived by the Browns and re-signed to the practice squad the following day

=== Houston Texans ===
On September 17, 2025, Bates was signed by the Houston Texans off the Browns' practice squad. He made three appearances for Houston, recording two receptions for 23 yards. Bates was waived on October 25.

=== Cleveland Browns (second stint) ===
On October 27, 2025, Bates was claimed off waivers by the Cleveland Browns.

On April 6, 2026, Bates re-signed with the Browns. On August 26, Bates was waived by Cleveland with an injury settlement.

=== Jacksonville Jaguars ===
On September 22, 2026, Bates signed with the Jacksonville Jaguars' practice squad.
