= Marquan McCall =

American football player (born 1999)

Profile
- Position: Defensive tackle

Personal information
- Born: March 26, 1999 (age 27); Detroit, Michigan, U.S.
- Listed height: 6 ft 3 in (1.91 m)
- Listed weight: 345 lb (156 kg)

Career information
- High school: Oak Park (MI)
- College: Kentucky (2018–2021)
- NFL draft: 2022: undrafted

Career history
- Carolina Panthers (2022); New England Patriots (2023)*; Chicago Bears (2023)*; Detroit Lions (2023)*; Las Vegas Raiders (2023–2024)*; San Antonio Brahmas (2025)*
- * Offseason or practice squad member only

Career NFL statistics as of 2023
- Total tackles: 15
- Stats at Pro Football Reference

Marquan McCall (born March 26, 1999) is an American professional football defensive tackle. He played college football at Kentucky.

== College career ==
McCall played at Kentucky from 2018 to 2021.

== Professional career ==
Pre-draft measurables
Height	Weight	Arm length	Hand span	Wingspan	40-yard dash	10-yard split	20-yard split	20-yard shuttle	Vertical jump	Broad jump	Bench press
6 ft 2 5/8 in (1.90 m)	342 lb (155 kg)	33 1/4 in (0.84 m)	11 in (0.28 m)	6 ft 8 7/8 in (2.05 m)	5.43 s	1.95 s	3.08 s	5.03 s	20.5 in (0.52 m)	7 ft 6 in (2.29 m)	26 reps
All values from NFL Combine/Pro Day

=== Carolina Panthers ===
McCall signed with the Carolina Panthers as an undrafted free agent on April 30, 2022, following the 2022 NFL draft. He made the Panthers' final 53 man roster after training camp.

On August 21, 2023, McCall was waived by the Panthers.

=== New England Patriots ===
On August 22, 2023, McCall was claimed off waivers by the New England Patriots, but was waived the next day due to a failed physical.

On October 10, 2023, the Minnesota Vikings hosted McCall for a workout, but no deal was reached.

=== Las Vegas Raiders ===
On December 19, 2023, McCall was signed to the practice squad of the Las Vegas Raiders. He signed a reserve/future contract on January 8, 2024. He was waived on August 27, and later re-signed to the practice squad. McCall was released by the Raiders on December 10.

=== San Antonio Brahmas ===
On March 11, 2025, McCall signed with the San Antonio Brahmas of the United Football League (UFL). He was released on March 20, 2025.
