= Mike Edwards (safety) =

American football player (born 1996)

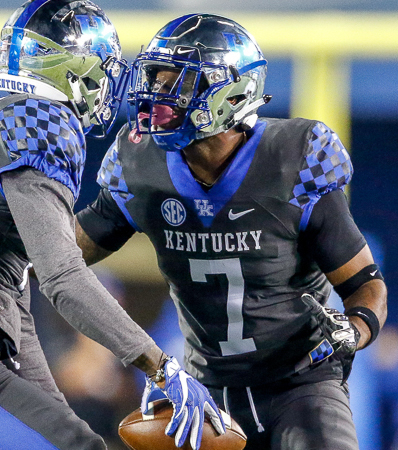
- Edwards with the Kentucky Wildcats in 2018

Profile
- Position: Safety

Personal information
- Born: May 18, 1996 (age 30); Cincinnati, Ohio, U.S.
- Listed height: 5 ft 10 in (1.78 m)
- Listed weight: 205 lb (93 kg)

Career information
- High school: Winton Woods (Cincinnati)
- College: Kentucky (2014–2018)
- NFL draft: 2019: 3rd round, 99th overall pick

Career history
- Tampa Bay Buccaneers (2019–2022); Kansas City Chiefs (2023); Buffalo Bills (2024); Tennessee Titans (2024); Tampa Bay Buccaneers (2024); Kansas City Chiefs (2025)

Awards and highlights
- 2× Super Bowl champion (LV, LVIII); 2× Second-team All-SEC (2016, 2018)

Career NFL statistics as of 2025
- Total tackles: 261
- Sacks: 3.0
- Forced fumbles: 1
- Fumble recoveries: 5
- Pass deflections: 28
- Interceptions: 8
- Defensive touchdowns: 4
- Stats at Pro Football Reference

Mike Edwards (born May 18, 1996) is an American professional football safety. He played college football for the Kentucky Wildcats, and was selected by the Buccaneers in the third round of the 2019 NFL draft. He won Super Bowl LV with Tampa Bay in 2020 and Super Bowl LVIII with the Kansas City Chiefs in 2023.

== Professional career ==
Pre-draft measurables
| Height | Weight | Arm length | Hand span | Wingspan | 40-yard dash | 10-yard split | 20-yard split | Vertical jump | Broad jump |
|---|---|---|---|---|---|---|---|---|---|
| 5 ft 10 1/2 in (1.79 m) | 205 lb (93 kg) | 30 7/8 in (0.78 m) | 9 1/8 in (0.23 m) | 6 ft 2 3/8 in (1.89 m) | 4.50 s | 1.58 s | 2.59 s | 37.0 in (0.94 m) | 9 ft 8 in (2.95 m) |
All values from NFL Combine/Pro Day

=== Tampa Bay Buccaneers (first stint) ===
Edwards was selected by the Tampa Bay Buccaneers in the third round of 2019 NFL draft with the 99th overall pick.

In Week 3 of the 2020 season against the Denver Broncos, Edwards recorded his first career interception off a pass thrown by Brett Rypien late in the fourth quarter to secure a 28–10 Buccaneers win. In the Divisional Round of the playoffs against the New Orleans Saints, Edwards intercepted a pass thrown by Drew Brees during the 30–20 win. Edwards earned his first Super Bowl ring when the Buccaneers defeated the Kansas City Chiefs in Super Bowl LV.

In Week 2 of the 2021 season against the Atlanta Falcons, Edwards recorded four tackles, three pass deflections, and two interceptions returned for touchdowns from Matt Ryan in a 48–25 win. As a result of his performance in Week 2, Edwards was named NFC Defensive Player of the Week. On December 2, 2021, Edwards was suspended for three games by the NFL for violating the league's COVID-19 protocols after he misrepresented his vaccination status.

=== Kansas City Chiefs (first stint) ===
Edwards signed a one-year contract with the Chiefs on March 20, 2023. In Edwards lone season with the Chiefs, he recorded 51 tackles, one sack, two fumble recoveries, one interception, and five passes defended. In the Wild Card victory over the Miami Dolphins, Edwards recorded an interception. In the Divisional round against the Buffalo Bills, Edwards left the game with a concussion. Edwards returned for the AFC Championship Game against the Baltimore Ravens where the Chiefs won and advanced to Super Bowl LVIII. In the Super Bowl, Edwards recorded 7 tackles and 1 pass defended in the Chiefs 25-22 victory over the San Francisco 49ers.

=== Buffalo Bills ===
On March 20, 2024, Edwards signed a one–year contract with the Buffalo Bills. On November 5, 2024, Edwards was released after only playing three games.

=== Tennessee Titans ===
On November 6, 2024, Edwards signed with the Tennessee Titans, but was released a week later.

=== Tampa Bay Buccaneers (second stint) ===
On November 14, 2024, Edwards was claimed off waivers by the Tampa Bay Buccaneers.

=== Kansas City Chiefs (second stint) ===
On April 3, 2025, Edwards signed with the Kansas City Chiefs on a one-year contract. He was released as part of final roster cuts on August 26, 2025 and re-signed to the practice squad the next day. Edwards was promoted to the active roster on December 6.
