= Phil Hoskins =

American football player (born 1997)

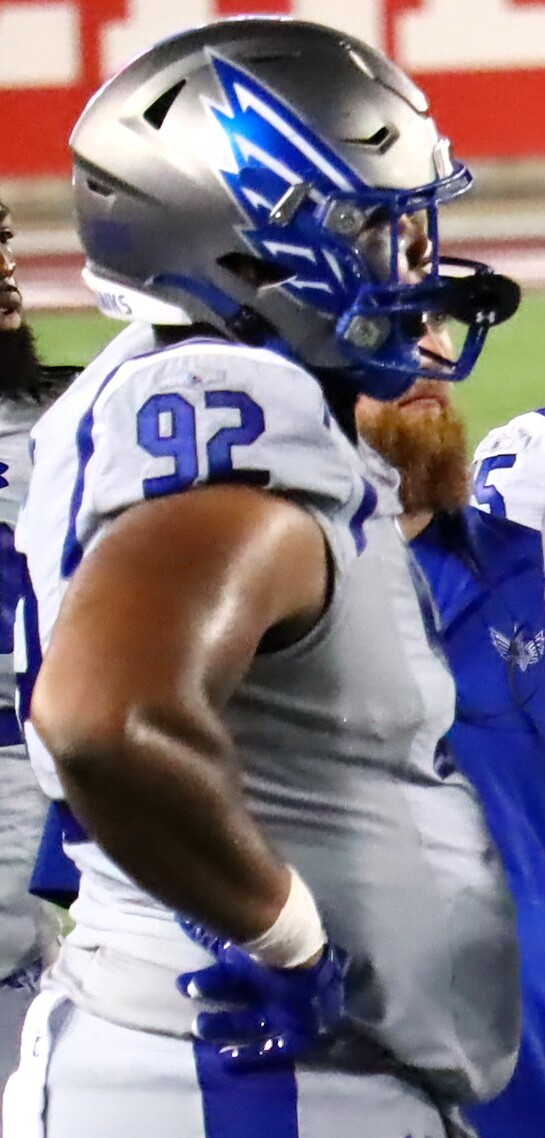
- Hoskins in 2025

Profile
- Position: Defensive end

Personal information
- Born: January 2, 1997 (age 29); Toledo, Ohio, U.S.
- Listed height: 6 ft 5 in (1.96 m)
- Listed weight: 280 lb (127 kg)

Career information
- High school: Whitmer (Toledo)
- College: Kentucky (2016–2020)
- NFL draft: 2021: 7th round, 232nd overall pick

Career history
- Carolina Panthers (2021–2022); Kansas City Chiefs (2022–2023)*; Arizona Cardinals (2023); Dallas Cowboys (2024)*; St. Louis Battlehawks (2025)
- * Offseason or practice squad member only

Awards and highlights
- Super Bowl champion (LVII)

Career NFL statistics as of 2023
- Total tackles: 14
- Sacks: 1
- Stats at Pro Football Reference

Phil Hoskins (born January 2, 1997) is an American professional football defensive end. He played college football at Kentucky and was selected by the Carolina Panthers in the seventh round of the 2021 NFL draft.

== Professional career ==
Pre-draft measurables
Height	Weight	Arm length	Hand span	40-yard dash	10-yard split	20-yard split	20-yard shuttle	Three-cone drill	Vertical jump	Broad jump	Bench press
6 ft 4 1/2 in (1.94 m)	313 lb (142 kg)	34 3/8 in (0.87 m)	8 5/8 in (0.22 m)	5.25 s	1.69 s	2.57 s	4.85 s	7.87 s	30.5 in (0.77 m)	8 ft 7 in (2.62 m)	20 reps
All values from the Kentucky Pro Day

=== Carolina Panthers ===
Hoskins was selected by the Carolina Panthers in the seventh round, 232nd overall, of the 2021 NFL draft. He signed his four-year rookie contract on May 13, 2021. On November 27, 2021, Hoskins was placed on the Panthers COVID-19 reserve list with three others. Hoskins' first career sack came against Miami Dolphins quarterback Tua Tagovailoa in a 33–10 loss.

On October 22, 2022, Hoskins was waived by the Panthers and re-signed to the practice squad.

=== Kansas City Chiefs ===
On January 12, 2023, Hoskins was signed to the practice squad of the Kansas City Chiefs. Hoskins won his first Super Bowl ring when the Chiefs defeated the Philadelphia Eagles in Super Bowl LVII.

Hoskins re-signed with the Chiefs on March 24, 2023. He was waived on August 29, 2023.

=== Arizona Cardinals ===
On October 3, 2023, Hoskins was signed to the Arizona Cardinals practice squad. On December 27, 2023, he was signed to the active roster.

On August 27, 2024, Hoskins was waived by the Cardinals.

=== Dallas Cowboys ===
Hoskins was signed to the practice squad of the Dallas Cowboys on August 29, 2024. He was released on October 16.

=== St. Louis Battlehawks ===
On January 14, 2025, Hoskins signed with the St. Louis Battlehawks of the United Football League (UFL).

=== DC Defenders ===
On January 13, 2026, Hoskins was selected by the DC Defenders in the 2026 UFL Draft.
