= 1995 Carolina Panthers season =

NFL team season (1st season)

- Owner: Jerry Richardson
- General manager: Bill Polian
- Head coach: Dom Capers
- Home stadium: Memorial Stadium (Clemson, South Carolina)

Results
- Record: 7–9
- Division place: 4th NFC West
- Playoffs: Did not qualify
- Pro Bowlers: None

The 1995 Carolina Panthers season was the franchise's inaugural season in the National Football League and the first under head coach Dom Capers. They went 7–9, the best debut year for any expansion franchise since the NFL's inception. The Panthers played their first season's home games at Clemson University because what would become Ericsson Stadium was still under construction after a deadline point in 1995 for scheduling Carolina's first set of NFL games.

== Offseason ==
The Panthers were jokingly called "Buffalo Bills South" because of the large number of former Bills on the roster. Quarterback Frank Reich, wide receiver Don Beebe, tight end Pete Metzelaars and linebacker Carlton Bailey had played key roles in the Bills' run of four consecutive Super Bowls earlier in the 1990s and were on the Panthers' inaugural roster. Furthermore, the team's general manager was longtime Bills GM and executive Bill Polian. (See also the 2001 San Diego Chargers season, in which a similar situation arose when John Butler brought several former Bills with him to San Diego after being fired.)

=== Expansion draft ===
1995 Carolina Panthers expansion draft
Round	Selection	Player	Position	Drafted from
1	2	Rod Smith^	CB	New England Patriots
2	4	Harry Boatswain	OT	San Francisco 49ers
3	6	Kurt Haws	TE	Washington Redskins
4	8	Tyrone Rodgers	DE	Seattle Seahawks
5	10	Mark Thomas^	DE	San Francisco 49ers
6	12	Tim McKyer^	CB	Pittsburgh Steelers
7	14	Curtis Whitley^	C	San Diego Chargers
8	16	Howard Griffith^	FB	Los Angeles Rams
9	18	Greg Kragen^	NT	Kansas City Chiefs
10	20	Cary Brabham	S	Los Angeles Raiders
11	22	Dave Garnett	LB	Minnesota Vikings
12	24	Andre Powell	LB	New York Giants
13	26	Dewell Brewer^	RB	Indianapolis Colts
14	28	Bob Christian^	FB	Chicago Bears
15	30	Fred Foggie	S	Pittsburgh Steelers
16	32	Mark Carrier^	WR	Cleveland Browns
17	34	Mark Rodenhauser^	C	Detroit Lions
18	36	Steve Hawkins	WR	New England Patriots
19	38	Brian O'Neal	RB	Philadelphia Eagles
20	40	Derrick Lassic	RB	Dallas Cowboys
21	42	Richard Buchanan	WR	Los Angeles Rams
22	44	Doug Pederson	QB	Miami Dolphins
23	46	Vince Marrow	TE	Buffalo Bills
24	48	Larry Ryans	WR	Detroit Lions
25	50	Baron Rollins	G	New Orleans Saints
26	52	Williams Sims	LB	Minnesota Vikings
27	54	Paul Butcher^	LB	Indianapolis Colts
28	56	Jack Trudeau^	QB	New York Jets
29	58	Charles Swann	WR	Denver Broncos
30	60	David Mims	WR	Atlanta Falcons
31	62	Shawn Price^	DE	Tampa Bay Buccaneers
32	63	Eric Guliford^	WR	Minnesota Vikings
33	64	Bill Goldberg	DT	Atlanta Falcons
34	65	Eric Ball	RB	Cincinnati Bengals
35	66	Mike Teeter^	DT	Houston Oilers

^ Made roster.

=== NFL draft ===
1995 Carolina Panthers draft
Round	Pick	Player	Position	College	Notes
1	5	Kerry Collins *	QB	Penn State	from Cincinnati (Note: The Panthers traded a first-round selection (1st overall) to Cincinnati in exchange for first- and second-round selections (5th and 36th overall).)
1	22	Tyrone Poole	CB	Fort Valley State	from Green Bay (Note: The Panthers traded first-, third-, and sixth-round selections (32nd, 65th, and 173rd overall) to Green Bay in exchange for first- and sixth-round selections (22nd and 191st overall).)
1	29	Blake Brockermeyer	OT	Texas	from San Diego (Note: The Panthers traded second-, third-, and fourth-round selections (34th, 98th, and 100th overall) to San Diego in exchange for a first-round selection (29th overall).)
2	36	Shawn King	DE	Louisiana–Monroe	from Cincinnati
4	132	Frank Garcia	C	Washington	
5	135	Michael Senters	WR	Northwestern	
5	171	Andrew Peterson	OT	Washington	
6	188	Steve Strahan	DT	Baylor	
6	191	Jerry Colquitt	QB	Tennessee	from Kansas City (Note: The Panthers traded a 1996 sixth-round selection to Kansas City in exchange for a sixth-round selection (191st overall).)
7	209	Chad Cota	SS	Oregon	
7	249	Michael Reed	SS	Boston College	
Made roster * Made at least one Pro Bowl during career

Draft trades

=== Undrafted free agents ===
1995 undrafted free agents of note
Player	Position	College
Willie Brookins	Linebacker	East Carolina
Kevin Feighery	Punter	Merchant Marine Academy
Tony Jones	Safety	Syracuse
David Lauder	Kicker	BYU
Billy Mitchell	Cornerback/Safety	Texas A&M
Ed Stuart	Linebacker	Nebraska
Allen Willlams	Running back	Maryland

== Personnel ==
=== Staff ===
1995 Carolina Panthers staff
Front office: Owner/founder – Jerry Richardson; President – Mike McCormack; General manager – Bill Polian; Head coaches: Head coach – Dom Capers; Offensive coaches: Offensive coordinator – Joe Pendry; Running backs – Chick Harris; Wide receivers – Richard Williamson; Tight ends – Don Breaux; Offensive line – Jim McNally; Assistant offensive line – Blair Bush; Offensive quality control – John Shoop	Defensive coaches: Defensive coordinator – Vic Fangio; Defensive line – Cary Godette; Linebackers – Kevin Steele; Outside linebackers – Billy Davis; Defensive Backs (Secondary) – George Catavolos; Defensive quality control – Greg Roman; Special teams coaches: Special teams – Brad Seely; Strength and conditioning: Strength and conditioning – Chip Morton

=== Roster ===
1995 Carolina Panthers roster
Quarterbacks (QB): 12 Kerry Collins; 14 Frank Reich; 10 Jack Trudeau; Running backs (RB): 44 Bob Christian FB; 30 Howard Griffith FB; 23 Anthony Johnson; 20 Derrick Moore; 32 Dino Philyaw; 31 Blair Thomas; Wide receivers (WR): 82 Don Beebe KR; 83 Mark Carrier; 86 Willie Green; 81 Reggie Jones; 80 Dwight Stone KR; 84 Brian Wiggins; Tight ends (TE): 87 Matt Campbell; 88 Pete Metzelaars; 89 Walter Rasby	Offensive linemen (OL): 78 Blake Brockermeyer T; 62 Mark Dennis T; 52 Matt Elliott G; 65 Frank Garcia G; 74 Derrick Graham T; 79 Sean Love G; 60 Andrew Peterson G; 63 Mark Rodenhauser; 64 Curtis Whitley C; Defensive linemen (DL): 93 Mike Fox DE; 96 Shawn King DE; 71 Greg Kragen NT; 92 Shawn Price DE; 98 Gerald Williams DE; 90 Jeff Zgonina NT	Linebackers (LB): 54 Carlton Bailey ILB; 53 Paul Butcher ILB; 56 Darion Conner OLB; 55 Brett Faryniarz OLB; 50 Jamal Fountaine OLB; 57 Lamar Lathon OLB; 51 Sam Mills ILB; 58 Andre Royal ILB; 59 Phil Yeboah-Kodie OLB; Defensive backs (DB): 33 Butler B'ynote' CB/KR; 37 Chad Cota FS; 29 Steve Lofton CB; 39 Brett Maxie SS; 25 Bubba McDowell SS; 22 Tim McKyer CB; 38 Tyrone Poole CB; 31 Rod Smith CB; 40 Pat Terrell FS; Special teams (ST): 6 Tommy Barnhardt P; 4 John Kasay K	Practice squad: -- Paul Burke TE; -- Kevin Farkas T; -- Marvin Ham S; -- Lorenzo Clark CB; Reserve: 26 Dewell Brewer RB (IR); 84 Eric Guliford WR (IR); 67 Brandon Hayes G (IR); 99 Jeremy Nunley DE (IR); 45 Michael Reed CB (IR); 47 Mike Senters CB (IR); 28 Tony Smith RB (IR); 91 Mike Teeter NT (IR); 95 Mark Thomas DE (IR); 85 Lawyer Tillman TE (IR); 32 Nate Turner FB (IR); Rookies in italics 53 active, 11 reserve, 4 practice squad

== Preseason ==
=== Preseason ===
Week	Date	Opponent	Result	Record	Venue	Attendance
HOF	July 29	at Jacksonville Jaguars	W 20–14	1–0	Fawcett Stadium	24,625
1	August 4	at Chicago Bears	L 15–18	1–1	Soldier Field	50,300
2	August 12	Denver Broncos	W 19–10	2–1	Memorial Stadium	57,017
3	August 19	at San Francisco 49ers	L 10–17	2–2	3Com Park	51,185
4	August 26	New York Giants	W 6–3	3–2	Memorial Stadium	49,114

== Regular season ==
Week	Date	Opponent	Result	Record	Venue	Recap
1	September 3	at **Atlanta Falcons**	**L** 20–23 (OT)	0–1	Georgia Dome	Recap
2	September 10	at Buffalo Bills	**L** 9–31	0–2	Rich Stadium	Recap
3	September 17	**St. Louis Rams**	**L** 10–31	0–3	Memorial Stadium	Recap
4	Bye					
5	October 1	Tampa Bay Buccaneers	**L** 13–20	0–4	Memorial Stadium	Recap
6	October 8	at Chicago Bears	**L** 27–31	0–5	Soldier Field	Recap
7	October 15	New York Jets	**W** 26–15	1–5	Memorial Stadium	Recap
8	October 22	**New Orleans Saints**	**W** 20–3	2–5	Memorial Stadium	Recap
9	October 29	at New England Patriots	**W** 20–17 (OT)	3–5	Foxboro Stadium	Recap
10	November 5	at **San Francisco 49ers**	**W** 13–7	4–5	Candlestick Park	Recap
11	November 12	at **St. Louis Rams**	**L** 17–28	4–6	Trans World Dome	Recap
12	November 19	Arizona Cardinals	**W** 27–7	5–6	Memorial Stadium	Recap
13	November 26	at **New Orleans Saints**	**L** 26–34	5–7	Louisiana Superdome	Recap
14	December 3	Indianapolis Colts	**W** 13–10	6–7	Memorial Stadium	Recap
15	December 10	**San Francisco 49ers**	**L** 10–31	6–8	Memorial Stadium	Recap
16	December 17	**Atlanta Falcons**	**W** 21–17	7–8	Memorial Stadium	Recap
17	December 24	at Washington Redskins	**L** 17–20	7–9	Robert F. Kennedy Memorial Stadium	Recap
Note: Intra-division opponents are in **bold** text.

== Season summary ==
=== Week 1: at Atlanta Falcons ===
Week One: Carolina Panthers at Atlanta Falcons

Quarter	1	2	3	4	OT	Total
Panthers	13	0	0	7	0	20
Falcons	3	10	7	0	3	23

at Georgia Dome, Atlanta, Georgia

- Date: September 3
- Game time: 1:00 p.m. EDT
- Game weather: None (played indoors)
- Game attendance: 58,808
- TV announcers (FOX): Thom Brennaman, Ron Pitts
- Box score

Game information

First quarter

- CAR – Pete Metzelaars 8-yard pass from Frank Reich (John Kasay kick). Panthers 7–0.
- CAR – John Kasay 39-yard field goal. Panthers 10–0.
- ATL – Morten Andersen 27-yard field goal. Panthers 10–3.
- CAR – John Kasay 41-yard field goal. Panthers 13–3.

Second quarter

- ATL – J. J. Birden 12-yard pass from Jeff George (Morten Andersen kick). Panthers 13–10.
- ATL – Morten Andersen 51-yard field goal. Tied 13–13.

Third quarter

- ATL – Bert Emanuel 5-yard pass from Jeff George (Morten Andersen kick). Falcons 20–13.

Fourth quarter

- CAR – Willie Green 44-yard pass from Frank Reich (John Kasay kick). Tied 20–20.

Overtime

- ATL – Morten Andersen 35-yard field goal. Falcons 23–20.

Top passers

- CAR – Frank Reich – 23/44, 329 yards, 2 TD
- ATL – Jeff George – 27/45, 290 yards, 2 TD, INT

Top rushers

- CAR – Randy Baldwin – 17 rushes, 43 yards
- ATL – Craig Heyward – 19 rushes, 61 yards

Top receivers

- CAR – Willie Green – 7 receptions, 121 yards, TD
- ATL – Eric Metcalf – 9 receptions, 95 yards

=== Week 2: at Buffalo Bills ===
Week Two: Carolina Panthers at Buffalo Bills

Quarter	1	2	3	4	Total
Panthers	0	6	3	0	9
Bills	0	0	28	3	31

at Rich Stadium, Orchard Park, New York

- Date: September 10
- Game time: 1:00 p.m. EDT
- Game weather: 53 °F (12 °C)
- Game attendance: 79,190
- TV announcers (FOX): Kenny Albert, Anthony Muñoz
- Box score

Game information

First quarter

- No scoring plays

Second quarter

- CAR – John Kasay 34-yard field goal. Panthers 3–0.
- CAR – John Kasay 52-yard field goal. Panthers 6–0.

Third quarter

- CAR – John Kasay 32-yard field goal. Panthers 9–0.
- BUF – Russell Copeland 77-yard pass from Jim Kelly (Steve Christie kick). Panthers 9–7.
- BUF – Thurman Thomas 4-yard run (Steve Christie kick). Bills 14–9.
- BUF – Darick Holmes 3-yard run (Steve Christie kick). Bills 21–9.
- BUF – Kurt Schulz 32-yard interception return (Steve Christie kick). Bills 28–9.

Fourth quarter

- BUF – Steve Christie 39-yard field goal. Bills 31–9.

Top passers

- CAR – Frank Reich – 6/21, 44 yards, INT
- BUF – Jim Kelly – 4/21, 176 yards, TD, 3 INT

Top rushers

- CAR – Derrick Moore – 14 rushes, 53 yards
- BUF – Thurman Thomas – 22 rushes, 91 yards, TD

Top receivers

- CAR – Mark Carrier – 2 receptions, 27 yards
- BUF – Russell Copeland – 2 receptions, 112 yards, TD

=== Week 3: vs. St. Louis Rams ===
Week Three: St. Louis Rams at Carolina Panthers

Quarter	1	2	3	4	Total
Rams	0	14	10	7	31
Panthers	0	3	0	7	10

at Memorial Stadium, Clemson, South Carolina

- Date: September 17
- Game time: 1:00 p.m. EDT
- Game weather: 73 °F (23 °C)
- Game attendance: 54,060
- TV announcers (FOX): Kenny Albert, Anthony Muñoz
- Box score

Game information

First quarter

- No scoring plays

Second quarter

- STL – Jerome Bettis 2-yard run (Steve McLaughlin kick). Rams 7–0.
- STL – Jessie Hester 23-yard pass from Chris Miller (Steve McLaughlin kick). Rams 14–0.
- CAR – John Kasay 45-yard field goal. Rams 14–3.

Third quarter

- STL – Anthony Parker 28-yard fumble return (Steve McLaughlin kick). Rams 21–3.
- STL – Steve McLaughlin 34-yard field goal. Rams 24–3.

Fourth quarter

- STL – Torin Dorn 24-yard interception return (Steve McLaughlin kick). Rams 31–3.
- CAR – Kerry Collins 1-yard run (John Kasay kick). Rams 31–10.

Top passers

- STL – Chris Miller – 15/26, 225 yards, TD
- CAR – Frank Reich – 8/19, 68 yards, INT

Top rushers

- STL – Jerome Bettis – 19 rushes, 67 yards, TD
- CAR – Vince Workman – 5 rushes, 48 yards

Top receivers

- STL – Isaac Bruce – 5 receptions, 100 yards
- CAR – Eric Guliford – 4 receptions, 53 yards

=== Week 5: vs. Tampa Bay Buccaneers ===
Week Five: Tampa Bay Buccaneers at Carolina Panthers

Quarter	1	2	3	4	Total
Buccaneers	7	6	0	7	20
Panthers	0	7	6	0	13

at Memorial Stadium, Clemson, South Carolina

- Date: October 1
- Game time: 1:00 p.m. EDT
- Game weather: 70 °F (21 °C)
- Game attendance: 50,076
- Box score

Game information

First quarter

- TB – Errict Rhett 1-yard run (Michael Husted kick). Buccaneers 7–0.

Second quarter

- CAR – Derrick Moore 53-yard run (John Kasay kick). Tied 7–7.
- TB – Michael Husted 25-yard field goal. Buccaneers 10–7.
- TB – Michael Husted 27-yard field goal. Buccaneers 13–7.

Third quarter

- CAR – Pete Metzelaars 4-yard pass from Kerry Collins (kick failed). Tied 13–13.

Fourth quarter

- TB – Casey Weldon 1-yard run (Michael Husted kick). Buccaneers 20–13.

Top passers

- TB – Casey Weldon – 9/20, 156 yards
- CAR – Kerry Collins – 18/32, 234 yards, TD, INT

Top rushers

- TB – Errict Rhett – 22 rushes, 50 yards, TD
- CAR – Derrick Moore – 21 rushes, 123 yards, TD

Top receivers

- TB – Jackie Harris – 5 receptions, 108 yards
- CAR – Mark Carrier – 5 receptions, 90 yards

=== Week 6: at Chicago Bears ===
Week Six: Carolina Panthers at Chicago Bears

Quarter	1	2	3	4	Total
Panthers	3	10	0	14	27
Bears	7	7	3	14	31

at Soldier Field, Chicago, Illinois

- Date: October 8
- Game time: 1:00 p.m. EDT/12:00 p.m. CDT
- Game weather: 53 °F (12 °C)
- Game attendance: 59,668
- Box score

Game information

First quarter

- CHI – Curtis Conway 41-yard pass from Erik Kramer (Kevin Butler kick). Bears 7–0.
- CAR – John Kasay 21-yard field goal. Bears 7–3.

Second quarter

- CAR – Mark Carrier 66-yard pass from Kerry Collins (John Kasay kick). Panthers 10–7.
- CHI – Keith Jennings 1-yard pass from Erik Kramer (Kevin Butler kick). Bears 14–10.
- CAR – John Kasay 49-yard field goal. Bears 14–13.

Third quarter

- CHI – Kevin Butler 23-yard field goal. Bears 17–13.

Fourth quarter

- CAR – Greg Kragen 1-yard fumble return (John Kasay kick). Panthers 20–17.
- CHI – Ryan Wetnight 1-yard pass from Erik Kramer (Kevin Butler kick). Bears 24–20.
- CAR – Eric Guliford 62-yard punt return (John Kasay kick). Panthers 27–24.
- CHI – Robert Green 1-yard run (Kevin Butler kick). Bears 31–27.

Top passers

- CAR – Kerry Collins – 14/28, 228 yards, TD, INT
- CHI – Erik Kramer – 23/41, 259 yards, 3 TD

Top rushers

- CAR – Derrick Moore – 15 rushes, 47 yards
- CHI – Rashaan Salaam – 28 rushes, 105 yards

Top receivers

- CAR – Mark Carrier – 4 receptions, 114 yards, TD
- CHI – Curtis Conway – 4 receptions, 77 yards, TD

=== Week 7: vs New York Jets ===
Week Seven: New York Jets at Carolina Panthers

Quarter	1	2	3	4	Total
Jets	0	12	0	3	15
Panthers	3	10	7	6	26

at Memorial Stadium, Clemson, South Carolina

- Date: October 15
- Game time: 4:00 p.m. EDT
- Game weather: 60 °F (16 °C)
- Game attendance: 52,613
- Referee: Mike Carey
- TV: NBC
- Box score

Game information

First quarter

- CAR – John Kasay 23-yard field goal. Panthers 3–0.

Second quarter

- NYJ – Kerry Collins tackled in ens zone by Erik Howard. Panthers 3–2.
- NYJ – Nick Lowery 50-yard field goal. Jets 5–3.
- NYJ – Mo Lewis 13-yard interception return (Nick Lowery kick). Jets 12–3.
- CAR – John Kasay 39-yard field goal. Jets 12–6.
- CAR – Sam Mills 36-yard interception return (John Kasay kick). Panthers 13–12.

Third quarter

- CAR – Vince Workman 5-yard run (John Kasay kick). Panthers 20–12.

Fourth quarter

- CAR – John Kasay 40-yard field goal. Panthers 23–12.
- NYJ – Nick Lowery 39-yard field goal. Panthers 23–15.
- CAR – John Kasay 30-yard field goal. Panthers 26–15.

Top passers

- NYJ – Bubby Brister – 17/41, 143 yards, 3 INT
- CAR – Kerry Collins – 14/26, 158 yards, 2 INT

Top rushers

- NYJ – Adrian Murrell – 9 rushes, 26 yards
- CAR – Derrick Moore – 21 rushes, 93 yards

Top receivers

- NYJ – Wayne Chrebet – 4 receptions, 56 yards
- CAR – Mark Carrier – 2 receptions, 42 yards

Players dumped Gatorade on Dom Capers after the win.

=== Week 8: vs. New Orleans Saints ===
Week Eight: New Orleans Saints at Carolina Panthers

Quarter	1	2	3	4	Total
Saints	0	3	0	0	3
Panthers	0	3	14	3	20

at Memorial Stadium, Clemson, South Carolina

- Date: October 22
- Game time: 1:00 p.m. EDT
- Game weather: 58 °F (14 °C)
- Game attendance: 55,484
- Box score

Game information

First quarter

- No scoring plays

Second quarter

- NO – Chip Lohmiller 29-yard field goal. Saints 3–0.
- CAR – John Kasay 45-yard field goal. Tied 3–3.

Third quarter

- CAR – Howard Griffith 2-yard pass from Kerry Collins (John Kasay kick). Panthers 10–3.
- CAR – Howard Griffith 1-yard run (John Kasay kick). Panthers 17–3.

Fourth quarter

- CAR – John Kasay 37-yard field goal. Panthers 20–3.

Top passers

- NO – Jim Everett – 27/48, 241 yards, 4 INT
- CAR – Kerry Collins – 8/21, 48 yards, TD

Top rushers

- NO – Mario Bates – 17 rushes, 43 yards
- CAR – Derrick Moore – 21 rushes, 88 yards

Top receivers

- NO – Wesley Walls – 4 receptions, 56 yards
- CAR – Mark Carrier – 2 receptions, 18 yards

=== Week 9: at New England Patriots ===
Week Nine: Carolina Panthers at New England Patriots

Quarter	1	2	3	4	OT	Total
Panthers	0	0	17	0	3	20
Patriots	0	3	0	14	0	17

at Foxboro Stadium, Foxborough, Massachusetts

- Date: October 29
- Game time: 1:00 p.m. CST
- Game weather: 54 °F (12 °C)
- Game attendance: 60,064
- Box score

Game information

First quarter

- No scoring plays

Second quarter

- NE – Matt Bahr 19-yard field goal. Patriots 3–0.

Third quarter

- CAR – John Kasay 27-yard field goal. Tied 3–3.
- CAR – Eric Guliford 24-yard pass from Kerry Collins (John Kasay kick). Panthers 10–3.
- CAR – Willie Green 33-yard pass from Kerry Collins (John Kasay kick). Panthers 17–3.

Fourth quarter

- NE – Curtis Martin 3-yard run (Matt Bahr kick). Panthers 17–10.
- NE – Curtis Martin 2-yard run (Matt Bahr kick). Tied 17–17.

Overtime

- CAR – John Kasay 29-yard field goal. Panthers 20–17.

Top passers

- CAR – Kerry Collins – 25/45, 309 yards, 2 TD, INT
- NE – Drew Bledsoe – 22/44, 228 yards

Top rushers

- CAR – Derrick Moore – 28 rushes, 119 yards
- NE – Curtis Martin – 24 rushes, 85 yards, 2 TD

Top receivers

- CAR – Eric Guliford – 7 receptions, 94 yards, TD
- NE – Vincent Brisby – 5 receptions, 62 yards

=== Week 10: at San Francisco 49ers ===
Week Ten: Carolina Panthers at San Francisco 49ers

Quarter	1	2	3	4	Total
Panthers	10	3	0	0	13
49ers	0	0	0	7	7

at 3Com Park, San Francisco, California

- Date: November 5
- Game time: 4:00 p.m. EST/1:00 PST
- Game weather: 55 °F (13 °C)
- Game attendance: 61,722
- Box score

Game information

First quarter

- CAR – John Kasay 39-yard field goal. Panthers 3–0.
- CAR – Tim McKyer 96-yard interception return (John Kasay kick). Panthers 10–0.

Second quarter

- CAR – John Kasay 47-yard field goal. Panthers 13–0.

Third quarter

- No scoring plays

Fourth quarter

- SF – Derek Loville 1-yard run (Tony Zendejas kick). Panthers 13–7.

Top passers

- CAR – Kerry Collins – 17/30, 150 yards, INT
- SF – Elvis Grbac – 26/37, 327 yards, 2 INT

Top rushers

- CAR – Derrick Moore – 18 rushes, 42 yards
- SF – Derek Loville – 12 rushes, 40 yards, TD

Top receivers

- CAR – Mark Carrier – 6 receptions, 59 yards
- SF – Jerry Rice – 8 receptions, 111 yards

=== Week 11: at St. Louis Rams ===
Week Eleven: Carolina Panthers at St. Louis Rams

Quarter	1	2	3	4	Total
Panthers	0	7	3	7	17
Rams	0	14	0	14	28

at TWA Dome, St. Louis, Missouri

- Date: November 12
- Game time: 1:00 p.m. EST/12:00 p.m. CST
- Game weather: None (played indoors)
- Game attendance: 65,598
- Box score

Game information

First quarter

- No scoring plays

Second quarter

- STL – Jerome Bettis 1-yard run (Dean Biasucci kick). Rams 7–0.
- STL – Isaac Bruce 12-yard pass from Chris Miller (Dean Biasucci kick). Rams 14–0.
- CAR – Don Beebe 21-yard pass from Kerry Collins (John Kasay kick). Rams 14–7.

Third quarter

- CAR – John Kasay 23-yard field goal. Rams 14–10.

Fourth quarter

- STL – Troy Drayton 2-yard pass from Chris Miller (Dean Biasucci kick). Rams 21–10.
- STL – Torin Dorn 26-yard fumble return (Dean Biasucci kick). Rams 28–10.
- CAR – Willie Green 17-yard pass from Kerry Collins (John Kasay kick). Rams 28–17.

Top passers

- CAR – Kerry Collins – 16/35, 228 yards, 2 TD, 4 INT
- STL – Chris Miller – 19/32, 216 yards, 2 TD, INT

Top rushers

- CAR – Howard Griffith – 13 rushes, 46 yards
- STL – Jerome Bettis – 26 rushes, 91 yards, TD

Top receivers

- CAR – Willie Green – 6 receptions, 157 yards, TD
- STL – Isaac Bruce – 9 receptions, 110 yards, TD

=== Week 12: vs. Arizona Cardinals ===
Week Twelve: Arizona Cardinals at Carolina Panthers

Quarter	1	2	3	4	Total
Cardinals	0	7	0	0	7
Panthers	0	14	6	7	27

at Memorial Stadium, Clemson, South Carolina

- Date: November 19
- Game time: 1:00 p.m. EST
- Game weather: 55 °F (13 °C)
- Game attendance: 49,582
- Box score

Game information

First quarter

- No scoring plays

Second quarter

- CAR – Pete Metzelaars 7-yard pass from Kerry Collins (John Kasay kick). Panthers 7–0.
- CAR – Bob Christian 2-yard pass from Kerry Collins (John Kasay kick). Panthers 14–0.
- ARI – Aeneas Williams 72-yard blocked field goal return (Greg Davis kick). Panthers 14–7.

Third quarter

- CAR – John Kasay 42-yard field goal. Panthers 17–7.
- CAR – John Kasay 30-yard field goal. Panthers 20–7.

Fourth quarter

- CAR – Anthony Johnson 23-yard run (John Kasay kick). Panthers 27–7.

Top passers

- ARI – Dave Krieg – 14/25, 106 yards
- CAR – Kerry Collins – 15/23, 201 yards, 2 TD

Top rushers

- ARI – Garrison Hearst – 9 rushes, 32 yards
- CAR – Howard Griffith – 25 rushes, 88 yards

Top receivers

- ARI – Frank Sanders – 3 receptions, 37 yards
- CAR – Mark Carrier – 5 receptions, 90 yards

=== Week 13: at New Orleans Saints ===
Week Thirteen: Carolina Panthers at New Orleans Saints

Quarter	1	2	3	4	Total
Panthers	3	8	8	7	26
Saints	7	10	10	7	34

at Louisiana Superdome, New Orleans, Louisiana

- Date: November 26
- Game time: 8:00 p.m. EST/7:00 p.m. EST
- Game weather: None (played indoors)
- Game attendance: 39,580
- TV announcers (ESPN): Mike Patrick, Joe Theismann and Mark Malone
- Box score

Game information

First quarter

- CAR – John Kasay 22-yard field goal. Panthers 3–0.
- NO – Mario Bates 4-yard run (Doug Brien kick). Saints 7–3.

Second quarter

- NO – Quinn Early 27-yard pass from Jim Everett (Duog Brien kick). Saints 14–3.
- CAR – Willie Green 60-yard pass from Kerry Collins (Kerry Collins pass to Walter Rasby). Saints 14–11.
- NO – Doug Brien 45-yard field goal. Saints 17–11.

Third quarter

- NO – Doug Brien 39-yard field goal. Saints 20–11.
- NO – Mario Bates 6-yard run (Doug Brien kick). Saints 27–11.
- CAR – Mark Carrier 3-yard pass from Kerry Collins (Kerry Collins pass to Bob Christian). Saints 27–19.

Fourth quarter

- NO – Derek Brown 35-yard run (Doug Brien kick). Saints 34–19.
- CAR – Mark Carrier 60-yard pass from Kerry Collins (John Kasay kick). Saints 34–26.

Top passers

- CAR – Kerry Collins – 17/46, 335 yards, 3 TD, 4 INT
- NO – Jim Everett – 15/29, 195 yards, TD, INT

Top rushers

- CAR – Bob Christian – 6 rushes, 39 yards
- NO – Mario Bates – 19 rushes, 71 yards, 2 TD

Top receivers

- CAR – Mark Carrier – 6 receptions, 132 yards, 2 TD
- NO – Quinn Early – 3 receptions, 60 yards, TD

=== Week 14: vs. Indianapolis Colts ===
Week Fourteen: Indianapolis Colts at Carolina Panthers

Quarter	1	2	3	4	Total
Colts	10	0	0	0	10
Panthers	0	10	0	3	13

at Memorial Stadium, Clemson, South Carolina

- Date: December 3
- Game time: 1:00 p.m. CST
- Game weather: 54 °F (12 °C)
- Game attendance: 49,841
- Referee: Ed Hochuli
- TV announcers (NBC): Jim Lampley and Bob Golic
- Box score

Game information

First quarter

- IND – Sean Dawkins 31-yard pass from Jim Harbaugh (Cary Blanchard kick). Colts 7–0.
- IND – Cary Blanchard 47-yard field goal. Colts 10–0.

Second quarter

- CAR – Kerry Collins 2-yard run (John Kasay kick). Colts 10–7.
- CAR – John Kasay 34-yard field goal. Tied 10–10.

Third quarter

- No scoring plays

Fourth quarter

- CAR – John Kasay 38-yard field goal. Panthers 13–10.

Top passers

- IND – Jim Harbaugh – 7/12, 102 yards, TD, INT
- CAR – Kerry Collins – 14/34, 170 yards

Top rushers

- IND – Marshall Faulk – 20 rushes, 53 yards
- CAR – Derrick Moore – 19 rushes, 58 yards

Top receivers

- IND – Sean Dawkins – 6 receptions, 81 yards
- CAR – Willie Green – 1 reception, 33 yards

=== Week 15: vs. San Francisco 49ers ===
Week Fifteen: San Francisco 49ers at Carolina Panthers

Quarter	1	2	3	4	Total
49ers	7	14	7	3	31
Panthers	0	3	7	0	10

at Memorial Stadium, Clemson, South Carolina

- Date: December 10
- Game time: 1:00 p.m. EST
- Game weather: 33 °F (1 °C)
- Game attendance: 76,136
- Box score

Game information

First quarter

- SF – Derek Loville 4-yard pass from Steve Young (Jeff Wilkins kick). 49ers 7–0.

Second quarter

- SF – Derek Loville 1-yard run (Jeff Wilkins kick). 49ers 14–0.
- CAR – John Kasay 43-yard field goal. 49ers 14–3.
- SF – J. J. Stokes 20-yard pass from Steve Young (Jeff Wilkins kick). 49ers 21–3.

Third quarter

- CAR – Derrick Moore 2-yard run (John Kasay kick). 49ers 21–10.
- SF – Steve Young 1-yard run (Jeff Wilkins kick). 49ers 28–10.

Fourth quarter

- SF – Jeff Wilkins 20-yard field goal. 49ers 31–10.

Top passers

- SF – Steve Young – 31/45, 336 yards, 2 TD, INT
- CAR – Kerry Collins – 12/29, 127 yards, INT

Top rushers

- SF – Derek Loville – 16 rushes, 34 yards, TD
- CAR – Derrick Moore – 9 rushes, 28 yards, TD

Top receivers

- SF – Jerry Rice – 6 receptions, 121 yards
- CAR – Willie Green – 3 receptions, 46 yards

=== Week 16: vs. Atlanta Falcons ===
Week Sixteen: Atlanta Falcons at Carolina Panthers

Quarter	1	2	3	4	Total
Falcons	14	3	0	0	17
Panthers	0	7	7	7	21

at Memorial Stadium, Clemson, South Carolina

- Date: December 17
- Game time: 1:00 p.m. EST
- Game weather: 50 °F (10 °C)
- Game attendance: 53,833
- Box score

Game information

First quarter

- ATL – Eric Metcalf 15-yard pass from Jeff George (Morten Andersen kick). Falcons 7–0.
- ATL – Craig Heyward 5-yard pass from Jeff George (Morten Andersen kick). Falcons 14–0.

Second quarter

- CAR – Kerry Collins 1-yard run (John Kasay kick). Falcons 14–7.
- ATL – Morten Andersen 34-yard field goal. Falcons 17–7.

Third quarter

- CAR – Derrick Moore 1-yard run (John Kasay kick). Falcons 17–14.

Fourth quarter

- CAR – Willie Green 89-yard pass from Kerry Collins (John Kasay kick). Panthers 21–17.

Top passers

- ATL – Jeff George – 29/53, 310 yards, 2 TD, 2 INT
- CAR – Kerry Collins – 18/28, 283 yards, TD, INT

Top rushers

- ATL – Craig Heyward – 16 rushes, 81 yards
- CAR – Derrick Moore – 10 rushes, 31 yards, TD

Top receivers

- ATL – Terance Mathis – 8 receptions, 102 yards
- CAR – Willie Green – 4 receptions, 147 yards, TD

=== Week 17: at Washington Redskins ===
Week Seventeen: Carolina Panthers at Washington Redskins

Quarter	1	2	3	4	Total
Panthers	3	7	0	7	17
Redskins	7	3	7	3	20

at Robert F. Kennedy Memorial Stadium, Washington, D.C.

- Date: December 24
- Game time: 4:00 p.m. EST
- Game weather: 33 °F (1 °C)
- Game attendance: 42,903
- Box score

Game information

First quarter

- CAR – John Kasay 42-yard field goal. Panthers 3–0.
- WAS – Terry Allen 1-yard run (Eddie Murray kick). Redskins 7–3.

Second quarter

- WAS – Eddie Murray 29-yard field goal. Redskins 10–3.
- CAR – Derrick Moore 1-yard run (John Kasay kick). Tied 10–10.

Third quarter

- WAS – Terry Allen 1-yard run (Eddie Murray kick). Redskins 17–10.

Fourth quarter

- WAS – Eddie Murray 32-yard field goal. Redskins 20–10.
- CAR – Willie Green 2-yard pass from Kerry Collins (John Kasay kick). Redskins 20–17.

Top passers

- CAR – Kerry Collins – 19/43, 201 yards, TD, 2 INT
- WAS – Gus Frerotte – 10/24, 185 yards

Top rushers

- CAR – Derrick Moore – 14 rushes, 47 yards, TD
- WAS – Terry Allen – 28 rushes, 92 yards, 2 TD

Top receivers

- CAR – Mark Carrier – 7 receptions, 101 yards
- WAS – Henry Ellard – 3 receptions, 98 yards

== Standings ==
NFC West
	W	L	T	PCT	PF	PA	STK
^{(2)} San Francisco 49ers	11	5	0	.688	457	258	L1
^{(6)} Atlanta Falcons	9	7	0	.563	362	349	W1
St. Louis Rams	7	9	0	.438	309	418	L3
Carolina Panthers	7	9	0	.438	289	325	L1
New Orleans Saints	7	9	0	.438	319	348	W1

== Records ==
- Most victories by an expansion team (7)
- First expansion team to have a winning record at home (5–3)
- First expansion team to have a four-game winning streak (weeks 7–10)
- First expansion team to defeat a defending Super Bowl champion in its inaugural season (13–7 over the San Francisco 49ers in San Francisco)
