= List of programs broadcast by TV Land =

This is a list of television programs formerly and currently broadcast by TV Land.

== Current programming ==
Title	Premiere date	Source(s)
Gunsmoke	April 29, 1996–present	
The Andy Griffith Show	March 21, 2000–present	
M*A*S*H	January 1, 2007 – 2013; February 20, 2017–present	
Roseanne	May 1, 2009–present	
Everybody Loves Raymond	March 18, 2010–present	
The King of Queens	October 24, 2011–present	
The Golden Girls	March 16, 2013–present	
The New Adventures of Old Christine	June 2015–present	
Seinfeld	February 11, 2023–present	

== Former programs ==
=== Originals ===
Title	Premiere date	End date
ALF's Hit Talk Show	July 7, 2004	December 11, 2004
Living in TV Land	August 18, 2004	2006
Chasing Farrah	March 23, 2005	April 27, 2005
Sit Down Comedy with David Steinberg	December 14, 2005	March 28, 2007
I Pity the Fool	October 11, 2006	November 15, 2006
TV Land: Myths and Legends	January 10, 2007	November 19, 2008
Back to the Grind	July 18, 2007	August 15, 2007
High School Reunion	March 5, 2008	2010
The Big 4-0	April 16, 2008	May 14, 2008
She's Got the Look	June 4, 2008	September 29, 2010
Family Foreman	July 16, 2008	August 20, 2008
The Cougar	April 15, 2009	June 3, 2009
Make My Day	August 5, 2009	September 9, 2009
How'd You Get So Rich?	August 9, 2009	June 2, 2010
First Love, Second Chance	March 10, 2010	April 2010
Hot in Cleveland	June 16, 2010	June 3, 2015
Harry Loves Lisa	October 6, 2010	November 10, 2010
Retired at 35	January 19, 2011	August 29, 2012
Happily Divorced	June 15, 2011	February 13, 2013
The Exes	November 30, 2011	September 16, 2015
The Soul Man	June 20, 2012	June 22, 2016
Forever Young	April 3, 2013	May 1, 2013
Kirstie	December 4, 2013	February 26, 2014
Jennifer Falls	June 4, 2014	August 13, 2014
Younger (seasons 1–6) (Note: The series moved to Paramount+.)	March 31, 2015	September 4, 2019
The Jim Gaffigan Show	July 15, 2015	August 21, 2016
Impastor	July 15, 2015	December 7, 2016
Instant Mom (season 3) (Note: The series moved from Nick at Nite and NickMom.)	September 19, 2015	December 19, 2015
Teachers	January 13, 2016	March 19, 2019
Lopez	March 30, 2016	June 21, 2017
Nobodies	March 29, 2017	May 31, 2018

=== Syndicated ===
Title	Premiere date	Source(s)
227	2006–2007	
30 Rock	2013	
3rd Rock from the Sun	2008–2010	
The A-Team	2000–2002; 2006–2007	
The Abbott and Costello Show	1998–2000	
Adam-12	1999–2001	
The Addams Family	1996–1998; 2004–2008	
The Adventures of Superman	2000–2004	
Airwolf	1999–2001	
ALF	2004	
Alfred Hitchcock Presents	1999–2001	
All in the Family	1998–2011	
America's Funniest Home Videos	April 3, 2015-2016	
Archie Bunker's Place	2002–2003	
The Bad News Bears	1997–1999	
Baretta	1999; 2001	
Barney Miller	2000–2003	
Batman	2001–2004	
Becker	2009–2011	
Benson	2006–2007	
The Beverly Hillbillies	2001–2002; 2007–2010; 2014–2015	
Bewitched	2004–2006; 2010–2011; 2015	
The Bob Newhart Show	1998; 2000–2004	
Bonanza	2003-2025	
Bosom Buddies	1997–1998	
Boston Legal	2010–2014	
The Brady Bunch	2001–2010; 2013–2015	
The Brady Kids	1996; 1998–1999	
Brooklyn Bridge	1996–1998	
Burke's Law	1996–1998; 2003	
The Burns and Allen Show	2002–2004	
Cannon	1996–1998	
Carol Burnett and Friends	2004–2005	
Charlie's Angels	2000–2003	
Cheers	2004–2008	
Chico and the Man	2000–2002; 2005	
China Beach	2000	
The Cosby Show	2006–2010; 2012–2014	
CSI: Crime Scene Investigation	2009–2010	
Curb Your Enthusiasm	2013–2015	
Daniel Boone	1997–1999; 2006	
Day by Day	1996–2000	
Dennis the Menace	2002–2003	
Designing Women	2007–2008	
The Dick Van Dyke Show	2000–2006; 2011–2013	
The Donna Reed Show	2001–2003; 2005	
Dragnet	1999–2001; 2005	
The Dukes of Hazzard	2015	
The Ed Sullivan Show	1996–1998; 2001	
Emergency!	1999–2001	
Extreme Makeover: Home Edition	2007–2013	
F Troop	2000–2001; 2005	
The Facts of Life	2000–2001; 2015–2016	
Family Affair	1998–1999; 2001	
Family Feud	2014–2016	
Fantasy Island	2003–2004	
Father Knows Best	2001–2004	
Fernwood 2 Night	2002–2003	
The Flip Wilson Show	1997–2001; 2004–2007	
The Flying Nun	2002–2003	
The Fonz and the Happy Days Gang	1999	
Friends	2013–2015	
The Fugitive	2000; 2004	
George Lopez	2016	
Get Smart	1999; 2001–2003; 2005	
Gilligan's Island	2002–2003; 2014–2016	
Gomer Pyle, U.S.M.C.	2000–2002	
Good Times	2005–2012	
Green Acres	1996–1999; 2004–2009	
Hawaii Five-O	2001-2006	
Happy Days	2002–2007	
Harlem Globetrotters	1999	
Have Gun – Will Travel	1996–2000	
Hazel	2001–2003	
Heckle and Jeckle with Quackula	1999	
Highway to Heaven	2005–2007	
Hill Street Blues	1996–2000	
Hogan's Heroes	1996–2002; 2008–2010; 2014–2015	
Home Improvement	2010–2013	
The Honeymooners	2000–2003	
Honey West	1996–1999	
How I Met Your Mother	2015-2018	
H.R. Pufnstuf	1997; 1999; 2004	
Hunter	2004–2006	
I Dream of Jeannie	1998–2000; 2003–2006; 2010–2011	
I Love Lucy	2001–2008; 2012–2014	
The Jeffersons	2001–2002; 2006–2012	
The Joey Bishop Show	1997–1999	
Johnny Ringo	1996–1999	
Julia	1997–2000	
Knight Rider	2006–2007	
Kojak	1999–2001; 2005	
Lancelot Link, Secret Chimp	1999	
Laverne & Shirley	2001–2002; 2005	
Leave It to Beaver	1998–2012	
Lidsville	1997; 2004	
Little House on the Prairie	2005–2010	
The Lone Ranger	1997-1998	
Love, American Style	1996–2000	
The Love Boat	2001–2004	
The Lucy–Desi Comedy Hour	2001–2004	
MacGyver	2003–2006	
Mad About You	2008	
Mannix	1996–2002	
The Many Loves of Dobie Gillis	1997–1999	
Marcus Welby, M.D.	1999–2001	
Married... with Children	2009–2011	
The Mary Tyler Moore Show	2001–2003	
Maude	1999–2001	
McHale's Navy	1999–2001	
Miami Vice	2005–2007	
Mike & Molly	2021–2025	
Mister Ed	1996–1998; 2003–2005	
Mom	2017—2018; 2022–2025	
The Monkees	1997; 2002–2005	
The Monroes	1997–1998	
The Munsters	1997–1998; 2000–2008	
Murder, She Wrote	2012–2013	
Murphy Brown	2006–2009	
My Three Sons	1998–2001	
The Nanny	2010–2016	
Nero Wolfe	1996–1999	
The Neighborhood	2022–2023	
The New Adventures of Mighty Mouse	1999	
Night Court	2005–2008	
The Odd Couple	2000–2002	
One Day at a Time (2017 TV series)	2020	Simulcast with Pop
Petticoat Junction	1996–2001; 2004	
The Phil Silvers Show	1996–2001	
Phyllis	1998–1999; 2001	
Reba	2015-2019	
Rhoda	1998–2001; 2005	
The Rockford Files	2001–2002	
The Rookies	2002	
Room 222	1997–2000	
Sanford and Son	1998–2000; 2003–2012	
Scrubs	2008–2009; 2011	
Shane	1996–1999	
Shazam!	2000–2004	
Sigmund and the Sea Monsters	1997; 1999; 2004	
Soap	2002–2004	
The Sonny & Cher Comedy Hour	1996–1999; 2001	
St. Elsewhere	1996–2000	
Star Trek	2006–2010	
Star Trek: The Animated Series	1998–1999	
Taxi	1999; 2001–2002	
That '70s Show	2012–2015	
That Girl	1996–1998; 2006–2008	
Three's Company	2003–2015	
'Til Death	2013	
Two and a Half Men	2018–2025	
Walker, Texas Ranger	2014–2015	
The Waltons	2002–2005	
Welcome Back, Kotter	2000–2003; 2005	
What's Happening!!	2005–2007	
The White Shadow	1996–1999	
Who's the Boss?	2014	
Wings	2004–2008	
WKRP in Cincinnati	2000; 2003	
Younger	2021	

=== Sporadic/special airings ===
- Ace Crawford, Private Eye (1996; 1998)
- All Is Forgiven (1998–99)
- America's Most Musical Family (one-off airing in 2019)
- All the Way (1998)
- American Dreamer (1998)
- Angie (1997–99)
- The Arsenio Hall Show (1998)
- The Art of Being Nick (1998)
- The Associates (1996–99)
- Bachelor Father (1999–2000)
- Barbary Coast (1996–99)
- Best of the West (1996–99)
- The Betty White Show (1998–2001)
- Blansky's Beauties (1996–99)
- Bob (1997–99)
- Bracken's World (1998; 2000)
- The Brady Brides (1996–97; 1999)
- The Brady Bunch Hour (1998–99)
- The Bradys (1996; 1998)
- The Byrds of Paradise (1997–98)
- Cade's County (1998)
- Call to Glory (1998)
- Combat! (1999)
- Coronet Blue (1997)
- The Daily Show with Trevor Noah (2015)
- Dallas (2005)
- The Dean Martin Show (1997)
- The Defenders (2000)
- The Detectives (1997–98)
- The Devlin Connection (1996–98)
- The Dick Powell Show (1996–98)
- Diff'rent Strokes (2001)
- Duet (1997–99)
- Dusty's Trail (1998)
- The Electric Company (1999)
- Fatherhood (2005)
- Ferris Bueller (1998)
- Flying Blind (1998)
- Frank's Place (1998–99)
- The Fresh Prince of Bel-Air (2005)
- Full House (2005)
- Good Company (1998)
- Grady (2002)
- The Great Adventure (1996; 1998–2000)
- He & She (1998; 2000)
- I'll Fly Away: Then and Now (1998)
- I Spy (1998)
- Ironside (1999–2001)
- It Takes a Thief (1999–2000)
- It's a Living (2001)
- The Jack Benny Program (1999–2000)
- Joanie Loves Chachi (1997–98)
- Judd, for the Defense (1997–99)
- Just Shoot Me! (2008)
- Lancer (1998)
- Lassie (2005)
- Laverne & Shirley in the Army (1998)
- The Lazarus Syndrome (1998)
- Legend (1998–99)
- Leg Work (1997–99)
- The Life of Riley (1997–98)
- The Lloyd Bridges Show (1997)
- The Loner (1998)
- The Magician (1998–99)
- Make Room for Daddy (2000; 2004–05)
- Making the Grade (1998)
- The Man from U.N.C.L.E. (1999)
- The Master (1998)
- Mayberry R.F.D. (2000–03; 2005)
- The Millionaire (1999)
- Misfits of Science (2000–01)
- Mission: Impossible (1996–97; 2001-2005)
- The Mod Squad (1999)
- Mr. Sunshine (1996; 1998–99)
- Mulligan's Stew (1996; 1998)
- The Nat King Cole Show (1998)
- The New Odd Couple (1996–99)
- Open House (1997–2000)
- Our Miss Brooks (1997–99)
- Paper Moon (1998)
- Paris (1998)
- Petrocelli (1998)
- Platypus Man (1998)
- The Ren & Stimpy Show (2005)
- The Rogues (1996–98)
- Roll Out (1997–98)
- The Royal Family (1997–98)
- Simon & Simon (2006)
- Sister Kate (1997–98)
- South Park (2022)
- Stagecoach West (1997–99)
- Stand by Your Man (1998; 2000)
- Storefront Lawyers (1998)
- S.W.A.T. (2001–02)
- The Tortellis (1998)
- The Untouchables (1997–98)
- Wagon Train (1999; 2001)
- The Westerner (1996–99)
- When Things Were Rotten (1996–98)
- Who's Watching the Kids? (1996–99)
- Working Girl (1997–99)
- Working It Out (1998)
- Yellowstone (2020)
- The Young Lawyers (1997–98)
- Zane Grey Theater (1996–99)

== Specials ==
- AFI Awards
- The Comedy Awards
- The 50 Greatest TV Icons
- TV Land Awards
- TV Land Confidential
- TV Land Movies
- TV Land Top 100 Most Unexpected Moments in TV History
- TV Land Top Ten
- MTV Video Music Awards
- CMT Music Awards
- NAACP Image Awards
- BET Awards
