= 1995 NFL expansion draft =

Selection of players by two NFL franchises

General information
- Sport: American football
- Date: February 15, 1995

Overview
- League: NFL
- Expansion teams: Carolina Panthers; Jacksonville Jaguars
- Expansion season: 1995

The 1995 National Football League expansion draft was held on February 15, 1995. The two new expansion teams, the Carolina Panthers and the Jacksonville Jaguars, alternated picks from lists of unprotected players from existing franchises. Existing NFL teams made six players available, and the new teams were required to pick a minimum of 30 and a maximum of 42 players. Each time one of the expansion franchises selected a player from an existing team, that team was then permitted to remove a remaining player from its list of available players.

The Jaguars were awarded the first pick in the expansion draft after winning a coin toss. The Panthers were then awarded the first overall pick in the 1995 NFL draft (which they eventually traded to the Cincinnati Bengals), and the Jaguars were given the second pick.

The Panthers ultimately picked 35 players, while the Jaguars picked 31.

== Player selections ==
Round–pick	NFL expansion team	Position	Player name	Previous NFL team
01–01	Jacksonville Jaguars	QB	Steve Beuerlein	Arizona Cardinals
01–02	Carolina Panthers	CB	Rod Smith	New England Patriots
02–03	Jacksonville Jaguars	CB	Corey Raymond	New York Giants
02–04	Carolina Panthers	OT	Harry Boatswain	San Francisco 49ers
03–05	Jacksonville Jaguars	OG	Jeff Novak	Miami Dolphins
03–06	Carolina Panthers	TE	Kurt Haws	Washington Redskins
04–07	Jacksonville Jaguars	TE	John Duff	Los Angeles Raiders
04–08	Carolina Panthers	DE	Tyrone Rodgers	Seattle Seahawks
05–09	Jacksonville Jaguars	LB	Keith Goganious	Buffalo Bills
05–10	Carolina Panthers	DE	Mark Thomas	San Francisco 49ers
06–11	Jacksonville Jaguars	LB	Mark Williams	Green Bay Packers
06–12	Carolina Panthers	CB	Tim McKyer	Pittsburgh Steelers
07–13	Jacksonville Jaguars	CB	Al Jackson	Philadelphia Eagles
07–14	Carolina Panthers	OL	Curtis Whitley	San Diego Chargers
08–15	Jacksonville Jaguars	C	Mark Tucker	Arizona Cardinals
08–16	Carolina Panthers	RB	Howard Griffith	Los Angeles Rams
09–17	Jacksonville Jaguars	DE	Paul Frase	New York Jets
09–18	Carolina Panthers	NT	Greg Kragen	Kansas City Chiefs
10–19	Jacksonville Jaguars	OG	Tom Myslinski	Chicago Bears
10–20	Carolina Panthers	DB	Cary Brabham	Los Angeles Raiders
11–21	Jacksonville Jaguars	WR	Willie Jackson	Dallas Cowboys
11–22	Carolina Panthers	LB	Dave Garnett	Minnesota Vikings
12–23	Jacksonville Jaguars	CB	Othello Henderson	New Orleans Saints
12–24	Carolina Panthers	LB	Andre Powell	New York Giants
13–25	Jacksonville Jaguars	LB	Santo Stephens	Cincinnati Bengals
13–26	Carolina Panthers	RB	Dewell Brewer	Indianapolis Colts
14–27	Jacksonville Jaguars	S	Darren Carrington	San Diego Chargers
14–28	Carolina Panthers	FB	Bob Christian	Chicago Bears
15–29	Jacksonville Jaguars	DB	Mike Davis	Houston Oilers
15–30	Carolina Panthers	DB	Fred Foggie	Pittsburgh Steelers
16–31	Jacksonville Jaguars	CB	Dave Thomas	Dallas Cowboys
16–32	Carolina Panthers	WR	Mark Carrier	Cleveland Browns
17–33	Jacksonville Jaguars	RB	Mazio Royster	Tampa Bay Buccaneers
17–34	Carolina Panthers	C	Mark Rodenhauser	Detroit Lions
18–35	Jacksonville Jaguars	WR	Travis Hannah	Houston Oilers
18–36	Carolina Panthers	WR	Steve Hawkins	New England Patriots
19–37	Jacksonville Jaguars	WR	Charles Davenport	Pittsburgh Steelers
19–38	Carolina Panthers	RB	Brian O'Neal	Philadelphia Eagles
20–39	Jacksonville Jaguars	DB	Monty Grow	Kansas City Chiefs
20–40	Carolina Panthers	RB	Derrick Lassic	Dallas Cowboys
21–41	Jacksonville Jaguars	RB	Marcus Wilson	Green Bay Packers
21–42	Carolina Panthers	WR	Richard Buchanan	Los Angeles Rams
22–43	Jacksonville Jaguars	LB	Brant Boyer	Miami Dolphins
22–44	Carolina Panthers	QB	Doug Pederson	Miami Dolphins
23–45	Jacksonville Jaguars	DB	Harry Colon	Detroit Lions
23–46	Carolina Panthers	TE	Vince Marrow	Buffalo Bills
24–47	Jacksonville Jaguars	TE	Derek Brown	New York Giants
24–48	Carolina Panthers	WR	Larry Ryans	Detroit Lions
25–49	Jacksonville Jaguars	LB	James Williams	New Orleans Saints
25–50	Carolina Panthers	OG	Baron Rollins	New Orleans Saints
26–51	Jacksonville Jaguars	OG	Eugene Chung	New England Patriots
26–52	Carolina Panthers	LB	Williams Sims	Minnesota Vikings
27–53	Jacksonville Jaguars	RB	Reggie Cobb	Green Bay Packers
27–54	Carolina Panthers	LB	Paul Butcher	Indianapolis Colts
28–55	Jacksonville Jaguars	WR	Desmond Howard	Washington Redskins
28–56	Carolina Panthers	QB	Jack Trudeau	New York Jets
29–57	Jacksonville Jaguars	WR	Kelvin Martin	Seattle Seahawks
29–58	Carolina Panthers	WR	Charles Swann	Denver Broncos
30–59	Jacksonville Jaguars	WR	Cedric Tillman	Denver Broncos
30–60	Carolina Panthers	WR	David Mims	Atlanta Falcons
31–61	Jacksonville Jaguars	CB	Rogerick Green	Tampa Bay Buccaneers
31–62	Carolina Panthers	DE	Shawn Price	Tampa Bay Buccaneers
32–63	Carolina Panthers	WR	Eric Guliford	Minnesota Vikings
33–64	Carolina Panthers	DE	Bill Goldberg	Atlanta Falcons
34–65	Carolina Panthers	RB	Eric Ball	Cincinnati Bengals
35–66	Carolina Panthers	DT	Mike Teeter	Houston Oilers
