= Eugene Chung =

American football player and coach (born 1969)

Delaware State Hornets
- Title: Offensive line coach & run game coordinator

Personal information
- Born: June 14, 1969 (age 57); Prince George's County, Maryland, U.S.
- Listed height: 6 ft 4 in (1.93 m)
- Listed weight: 295 lb (134 kg)

Career information
- Position: Offensive tackle (No. 69, 66)
- High school: Oakton (Vienna, Virginia)
- College: Virginia Tech
- NFL draft: 1992: 1st round, 13th overall pick
- Expansion draft: 1995: 26th round, 51st overall pick

Career history

Playing
- New England Patriots (1992–1994); Jacksonville Jaguars (1995); San Francisco 49ers (1996)*; Green Bay Packers (1997)*; Indianapolis Colts (1997); Kansas City Chiefs (1998–1999)*; Philadelphia Eagles (2000)*
- * Offseason or practice squad member only

Coaching
- Philadelphia Eagles (2010−2012) Assistant offensive line coach; Kansas City Chiefs (2013−2015) Assistant offensive line coach; Philadelphia Eagles (2016−2019) Assistant offensive line coach, tight ends coach & run game coordinator; Delaware State (2025−present) Offensive line coach & run game coordinator

Awards and highlights
- As player: PFWA All-Rookie Team (1992); First-team All-American (1991); First-Team All-South Independent (1990); As coach: Super Bowl champion (LII)

Career NFL statistics
- Games played: 55
- Games started: 30
- Stats at Pro Football Reference

Eugene Yon Chung (born June 14, 1969) is an American former professional football player who was an offensive tackle in the National Football League (NFL) from 1992 to 1997. Chung currently serves as the offensive line coach at Delaware State University. He played college football for the Virginia Tech Hokies, earning All-American honors in 1991. He is also a former American football coach.

== Professional playing career ==
Pre-draft measurables
Height	Weight	Arm length	Hand span	40-yard dash	10-yard split	20-yard split	20-yard shuttle	Vertical jump	Broad jump	Bench press
6 ft 4 5/8 in (1.95 m)	295 lb (134 kg)	32 1/2 in (0.83 m)	10 1/2 in (0.27 m)	5.22 s	1.82 s	3.00 s	4.90 s	32.0 in (0.81 m)	9 ft 6 in (2.90 m)	23 reps

The New England Patriots drafted Chung in the first round with the 13th overall selection out of Virginia Tech in the 1992 NFL draft. Chung was the first Korean American to be drafted in the first round of an NFL Draft. He played three seasons with New England. In 1992, Chung played in 15 games, starting 14, and was named to the NFL's All-Rookie Team. The following season, he started all 16 games in Bill Parcells’ first year as Patriots coach. That season, Chung helped paved the way for Leonard Russell to rush for over 1,000 yards.

Chung was selected by the Jacksonville Jaguars in the 1995 NFL expansion draft. He played one season with the Jaguars and one with the Indianapolis Colts before retiring.

Chung was elected to the Virginia Tech Sports Hall of Fame in 2008.

== Professional coaching career ==
Chung was the assistant offensive line coach for the Kansas City Chiefs from 2013 to 2015 under head coach Andy Reid, after serving three seasons with him in Philadelphia Eagles in the same capacity. Chung was re-hired by the Eagles on January 20, 2016, by new head coach Doug Pederson, who was Chung's offensive coordinator with the Chiefs. As a coach, Chung won Super Bowl LII with the Eagles when they defeated the New England Patriots 41–33.

During the 2021 offseason, Chung alleged he was told he was "not the right minority" during a recent NFL coaching job interview. The league announced it would review the alleged comment, but on July 1st said that they were unable to confirm the nature or origin of the alleged statements.

In 2025, he was hired by Delaware State to be their offensive line coach and run game coordinator, reuniting him with DeSean Jackson whom he knew during his time with the Eagles.

== Personal life ==
Chung is of Korean descent. Chung's son, Kyle, followed in his footsteps as an offensive lineman at Virginia Tech.
