= Calvary Baptist Academy (Shreveport, Louisiana) =

Location
- 9333 Linwood Avenue; Shreveport, Louisiana 71106; United States; 32°24′13″N 93°45′43″W

Information
- Type: Private
- Denomination: Baptist
- Established: 1970
- School district: Caddo Parish
- Superintendent: Chad McDowell
- Principal: Kevin Guerro (secondary); Tiffany Toups (K4-6th grade)
- Staff: 13.8
- Teaching staff: 61.6 (on an FTE basis) (2021–22)
- Grades: PK–12
- Enrollment: 911 (2021–22)
- Colors: Forest green and gold
- Nickname: Cavaliers
- Website: http://www.calvarycavaliers.org/

Calvary Baptist Academy is a private co-educational school located in Shreveport, Louisiana, United States. The school's enrollment is approximately 600 students, K–12th grade.

== Athletics ==
Calvary Baptist athletics competes in the LHSAA.

=== Championships ===
Football championships

- (4) State Championships: 2013, 2014, 2020, 2023

Softball championships

- (5) State Championships: 2021, 2022, 2023, 2024, 2025, 2026

== Notable alumni ==
- Addison Rae Easterling, singer and actress
- Sam Burns, professional golfer
- Shea Patterson, professional football player (transferred after junior year)
- Greedy Williams, NFL player
- Rodarius Williams, NFL player
- Brandon Wilson, NFL player

== Notable staff ==
- Victoria Leonardo, mixed martial artist; Spanish teacher
- Doug Pederson, former NFL head coach of the Philadelphia Eagles & Jacksonville Jaguars; coached the football teams from 2005 to 2008 and 2022 to 2024 respectfully
- Todd Walker, MLB player and college basketball player; coached baseball at Calvary Baptist Academy from 2013 to 2015
