= Forestville High School =

Public magnet high school in Maryland, US

Location
- 7001 Beltz Dr; Forestville, Maryland 20747; United States; 38°50′14″N 76°53′10″W

Information
- Type: Public Magnet High School
- Established: 1982
- Closed: 2016
- School district: Prince George's County Public Schools
- Superintendent: Kevin M. Maxwell
- Principal: Nathaniel Laney
- Grades: 9–12
- Enrollment: 792
- Campus type: Suburban, urban
- Nickname: Knights

Forestville High School was a public magnet high school located in Forestville, a section of unincorporated Prince George's County, Maryland, United States. The school had a comprehensive program with a specialized military academy magnet program.

The academy, part of Prince George's County Public Schools, was notable as the only military academy in Prince George's County.

Forestville High School was part of the United States Government's JROTC program. In addition to this, Forestville High School has been recognized in the 2006–2007 school year for making the Annual Yearly Progress (AYP). Also, around 50% of students attending FMA have passed the HSA exams.

The principal of the school was Nathaniel Laney, a Prince George's County native. The JROTC program was first implemented for all grade levels in 2006, which was led by Major General Warren L. Freeman, the school's commandant. The school mandated JROTC as a class for all grade levels, based on Leadership Education Training (LET). All students began with a rank of cadet, ending with colonel. However, very few students progressed to the highest rank. In order to be promoted, one must merit it through a minimum of GPAs (depending on rank sought). Also, for the rank of Sergeant First Class and above promotions, students had to present themselves on the Promotion Board (based on peers).

== History ==
Prior to 1982, the physical buildings that became Forestville High School, located on Beltz Drive, housed Forestville Elementary and Spaulding Junior High School from 1965 - 1982, respectively. Among the faculty of Forestville Elementary was long-time principal, Mrs. Barbara Johnson and teacher Mrs. Dorothy Murray.

In the Fall of 2002, the first military academy class was admitted to Forestville. Along with this came an increase in numbers of those who were members of the JROTC program. Forestville High School then moved from a Battalion JROTC level to a Brigade JROTC level, one of the largest in the state of Maryland. The first Brigade Commander was Cadet Colonel Rashonda Tangle and the highest ranking Cadet Non-Commissioned Officer was Cadet Command Sergeant Major Kiana Carr. In the fall of 2006 came more evolution. Forestville High School became Forestville Military Academy, with all students in grades 9 - 12 being enrolled in ARJROTC. In addition, with one of the largest populations of students enrolled in JROTC at a public secondary institution, Forestville became a Regiment of cadets. Cadet Colonel Jeshawna Wholley became the first Regiment Commander and Cadet Command Sergeant Major Valicia Demery became first regiment CSM of Forestville Military Academy.

While members on the Board of Education of Prince George County are opposed to Forestville keeping its Military Academy status, the academy still remains an Army Unit With Distinction. Former Cadets Colonel K. Holmes (Former Regiment Commander), Lt.Colonel A. Michel (Former Deputy Regiment Commander), Lt.Colonel E. Hunter(Former Regiment Executive Officer), and CSM. E.Boyd (Former Regiment CSM) led the charge of keeping Forestville a complete Military Academy. Although many people try to tear down the values and status of the school, FMA still keeps its national status of excellence. It welcomes new cadets every year and its main mission is to promote higher education and motivate young people into becoming better citizens.

On March 8, 2016, CEO Dr. Kevin Maxwell sent a letter to parents that Forestville would be closed after the end of the 2015–2016 school year, despite protests against closing the school. PG County officials stated that the continued operations of the school could interfere with funding of nearby Suitland High School. At the time Forestville had fewer than 800 students. According to Maxwell, the primary rationale for closure was the decrease in the school's number of students. Students in the attendance zone of neighboring Suitland High were reassigned there for the 2016–2017 school year while others were reassigned to their neighborhood schools.

== Notable alumni ==
- Patrick Clark, professional wrestler
- Ginuwine, singer
- Quentin Hillsman, college basketball coach
- Santo Stephens, NFL player
- Walt Williams, NBA player

== See also ==
- Public military schools in the United States
