= The Devlin Connection =

- Genre: Detective fiction Procedural drama
- Created by: John Wilder
- Starring: Rock Hudson; Jack Scalia
- Theme music composer: Patrick Williams
- Country of origin: United States
- No. of seasons: 1
- No. of episodes: 13

Production
- Executive producer: Jerry Thorpe
- Producers: Cliff Gould; Harvey Frand
- Running time: 48 minutes
- Production companies: Jerry Thorpe Productions; Mammoth Films, Inc. Viacom Productions

Original release
- Network: NBC
- Release: October 2 – December 25, 1982

The Devlin Connection is an American television crime drama created by John Wilder and starring Rock Hudson and Jack Scalia. The show aired on NBC for 13 episodes in 1982, premiering on October 2.

== Premise ==
Hudson stars as Brian Devlin, a former military intelligence officer and ex-owner of a detective agency who is now the director of the Performing Arts Center in Los Angeles. Devlin meets racquetball pro and private investigator Nick Corsello (Scalia), who is revealed to be Devlin's son from a brief affair 28 years earlier. The accent of the show was put on the fun of investigating crimes instead of classic dramatic crime-solving procedure. Usually Nick would have a case and Brian — wanting to forge a relationship with his long-lost son, but also wanting his son to succeed independently — would unofficially help out with the investigation, sometimes surreptitiously and without Nick's prior knowledge. The duo would proceed to solve each mystery-of-the-week, along the way verbally sparring in a light-hearted fashion about their different investigatory methods and perspectives on life. Hudson's intent was to create "classy, sophisticated, educational, literate entertainment".

Hudson and Scalia had previously worked together on the film The Star Maker in 1981. The Devlin Connection was Harvey Frand's first job as a producer.

== Cast ==
Jack Scalia and Rock Hudson

=== Main cast (all episodes) ===
- Rock Hudson as Brian Devlin, director of Performing Arts Center
- Jack Scalia as Nick Corsello, racquetball pro and private detective

=== Supporting cast, episodes 1–9 (as aired) ===
- Leigh Taylor-Young as Lauren Dane, Brian's assistant
- Louis Giambalvo as Lt. Earl Borden, Nick's friend and former colleague from New York
- Takayo as Mrs. Watanabe, Brian's housekeeper
- Melanie Vincz as Alice Arms, Nick's health club co-worker
- Jack Kruschen as Max Salkall, orchestra conductor at Performing Arts Center

=== Supporting cast, episodes 10–13 (as aired) ===
- Irene Tedrow as Margaret Hollister, Brian's assistant
- Herbert Jefferson Jr. as Otis Barnes, Nick's friend and night club owner

== Production changes ==
Original production started in 1981. After four episodes were filmed production was delayed a year due to Hudson's heart problems — heart surgery with five heart bypasses.

In the initial four episodes of The Devlin Connection (in production order, not broadcast order) the show is a slightly gritty P.I. drama. Brian has an older assistant (Irene Tedrow) and his office and apartment are modest. Nick is a Vietnam veteran who works as a small-time private detective operating out of a night club run by his friend Otis (Herbert Jefferson Jr.). The types of cases tackled by Brian and Nick usually involved ordinary people in dire, slightly seedy, and decidedly unglamorous circumstances.

When production resumed after about a year the entire supporting cast was replaced. Changes were made to the characters of Brian and Nick and to the tone of the show. The stories became much more upscale, usually involving rich, glamorous people. Brian's office and apartment are much larger and more sumptuous, and he lives a more conspicuously flashy lifestyle. Brian's assistant is an exceptionally stylish younger woman (Leigh Taylor-Young). At his home he has a housekeeper (Takayo). Nick is a former NYPD officer (instead of being a Vietnam vet) and is not a full-time professional P.I. but instead is a racquetball pro who works at a health club and investigates on the side. Nick has a friend/police contact from his days with the NYPD (Louis Giambalvo) who is a Lieutenant with the LAPD, and with whom Nick has a friendly but sometimes contentious relationship. At the health club where Nick works he often flirts with his shapely co-worker Alice (Melanie Vincz), who is nearly always seen in an extremely form-fitting leotard.

At Hudson's insistence the nine flashier episodes aired first. This meant, from the audience's perspective, that the series abruptly changed tone from flashy to mildly gritty after the first nine weeks and the show's supporting characters were dropped without explanation. Even more confusing, the episode where Nick and Brian actually meet, "Claudine", aired as the tenth episode.

== Episodes ==
No.	Title	Directed by	Written by	Original release date
1	"Brian and Nick"	Christian I. Nyby II	Cliff Gould	October 2, 1982
2	"Lady on the Billboard"	James Frawley	Henri Simoun	October 9, 1982
3	"Love, Sin and Death at Point Dume"	Christian I. Nyby II	Guerdon Trueblood	October 16, 1982
4	"The Corpse in the Corniche"	Barry Crane	Howard Berk	October 23, 1982
5	"The Absolute Monarch of Ward C"	Barry Crane	Michael Sloan	October 30, 1982
6	"The French Detective"	Rod Holcomb	Story by : Peter Lefcourt; Teleplay by : Howard Rodman & Cliff Gould and Peter Lefcourt	November 6, 1982
7	"Of Nuns and Other Black Birds"	Christian I. Nyby II	Robert Dozier & Rob Gilmer	November 13, 1982
8	"Ring of Kings, Ring of Thieves"	Jeff Bleckner	Rudolph Borchert	November 27, 1982
9	"Arsenic and Old Caviar"	James Frawley	Rudolph Borchert	December 4, 1982
10	"Claudine"	Lee H. Katzin	John Wilder	December 11, 1982
11	"Allison"	Bernard L. Kowalski	Anne Collins	December 18, 1982
12	"Erica"	Bernard L. Kowalski	Peter Lefcourt	December 25, 1982
13	"Jennifer"	Lee H. Katzin	Frank V. Furino	January 8, 1983^{1}

^{1}NBC burned off the final episode without notice in early 1983. All 13 episodes aired on TV Land from 1996–1998.

== Ratings ==
Season	Episodes	Start date	End date	Nielsen rank	Nielsen rating
1982–83	13	October 2, 1982	December 25, 1982	96	N/A

== Video releases ==
In the mid-1980s Trans World Entertainment officially released the first three episodes on VHS videotape cassettes. There are also bootleg DVDs of all the TV Land aired episodes.
