= Santo Stephens =

American football player (born 1969)

No. 53
- Position: Linebacker

Personal information
- Born: June 16, 1969 (age 57); Washington, D.C., U.S.
- Listed height: 6 ft 4 in (1.93 m)
- Listed weight: 244 lb (111 kg)

Career information
- High school: Forestville (Forestville, Maryland)
- College: Temple
- NFL draft: 1992: undrafted
- Expansion draft: 1995: 13th round, 25th overall pick

Career history
- Kansas City Chiefs (1992)*; San Diego Chargers (1992)*; Kansas City Chiefs (1993); Cincinnati Bengals (1994); Jacksonville Jaguars (1995–1996)
- * Offseason or practice squad member only

Career NFL statistics
- Tackles: 16
- Stats at Pro Football Reference

Santo Sean Stephens (born June 16, 1969) is an American former professional football player who was a linebacker for three seasons in the National Football League (NFL) with the Kansas City Chiefs, Cincinnati Bengals and Jacksonville Jaguars. He played college football for the Temple Owls.

== Early life ==
Santo Sean Stephens was born on June 16, 1969, in Washington, D.C. He attended Forestville High School in Forestville, Maryland.

== Professional career ==
Stephens signed with the Kansas City Chiefs on May 12, 1992. He was released by the Chiefs on September 1, 1992. He later rejoined the team and played in sixteen games for the Kansas City Chiefs in 1993.

Stephens was signed by the Cincinnati Bengals on April 12, 1994. He played in fourteen games, starting three, for the Bengals during the 1994 season.

Stephens was selected by the Jacksonville Jaguars with the 25th pick in the 1995 NFL expansion draft and played in thirteen games for the team during the 1995 season. He recorded the first tackle in Jaguars history. He was placed on injured reserve with a knee injury by the Jaguars on August 19, 1996. Stephens was released by the Jaguars on October 18, 1996.
