= John Duff (American football) =

American football player (born 1967)

No. 84
- Position: Tight end

Personal information
- Born: July 31, 1967 (age 59); Columbus, Ohio, U.S.
- Listed height: 6 ft 7 in (2.01 m)
- Listed weight: 250 lb (113 kg)

Career information
- High school: Foothill
- College: New Mexico
- NFL draft: 1989: undrafted
- Expansion draft: 1995: 4th round, 7th overall pick

Career history
- Dallas Cowboys (1989); Los Angeles Raiders (1993–1994); Jacksonville Jaguars (1995); Philadelphia Eagles (1997)*
- * Offseason or practice squad member only

Awards and highlights
- Second-team All-WAC (1988)
- Stats at Pro Football Reference

John Edward Duff (born July 31, 1967) is an American former professional football player who was a tight end for the Los Angeles Raiders of the National Football League (NFL). He played college football for the New Mexico Lobos.
