= Kurt Haws =

American football player (born 1969)

No. 82
- Position: Tight end

Personal information
- Born: September 25, 1969 (age 57); Mesa, Arizona, U.S.
- Listed height: 6 ft 5 in (1.96 m)
- Listed weight: 248 lb (112 kg)

Career information
- High school: Mountain View (Mesa)
- College: Utah
- NFL draft: 1994: 4th round, 105th overall pick
- Expansion draft: 1995: 3rd round, 6th overall pick

Career history
- Washington Redskins (1994); Carolina Panthers (1995)*
- * Offseason or practice squad member only

Career NFL statistics
- Return yards: 10
- Stats at Pro Football Reference

Kurt Leroy Haws (born September 25, 1969) is an American former professional football player who was a tight end in the National Football League (NFL) for the Washington Redskins. He played college football for the Utah Utes. He was selected in the fourth round of the 1994 NFL draft with the 105th overall pick. Haws was also selected by the Carolina Panthers as the sixth selection in the 1995 NFL expansion draft. From 1989 to 1991 he was on a Mormon mission in Venezuela.
