= The Big 4-0 =

- Genre: Reality television
- Directed by: Rick Pendleton; Brian Smith
- Composer: Jeff Lippencott
- Country of origin: United States
- Original language: English

Production
- Editor: Frank Lagnese
- Production company: 3 Ball Productions

Original release
- Release: 1 January 2008

The Big 4-0 is a TV Land original program that began airing April 14, 2008. The series highlights the celebrations of six people who turn 40. Documentary-style interviews are conducted with each of the celebrants. The series was filmed in various locations throughout the United States.

== Episodes ==
- Episode 1: The first episode features Derrick

== Celebrants ==
- Derrick
- Lisa
- Brian
- Tonya
- Rita
- DeeAnn
