= Shawn Price =

American football player (born 1970)

No. 92, 91
- Positions: Defensive end, defensive tackle

Personal information
- Born: March 30, 1970 (age 56); Van Nuys, California, U.S.
- Listed height: 6 ft 4 in (1.93 m)
- Listed weight: 290 lb (132 kg)

Career information
- College: Pacific
- NFL draft: 1993: undrafted
- Expansion draft: 1995: 31st round, 62nd overall pick

Career history
- Tampa Bay Buccaneers (1993–1994); Carolina Panthers (1995); Buffalo Bills (1996–2001); San Diego Chargers (2002); Detroit Lions (2003)*
- * Offseason or practice squad member only

Career NFL statistics
- Tackles: 169
- Sacks: 14.5
- Forced fumbles: 1
- Stats at Pro Football Reference

Shawn Price (born March 28, 1970) is an American former professional football player who was a defensive end in the National Football League (NFL) for the Tampa Bay Buccaneers, Carolina Panthers, Buffalo Bills, and San Diego Chargers. He played college football for the Pacific Tigers, as well as at Sierra College, which is located in Rocklin, California. He was selected by the Carolina Panthers in the 31st round with the 62nd pick in the 1995 NFL expansion draft.
