= Derrick Moore (running back) =

American football player and coach (born 1967)

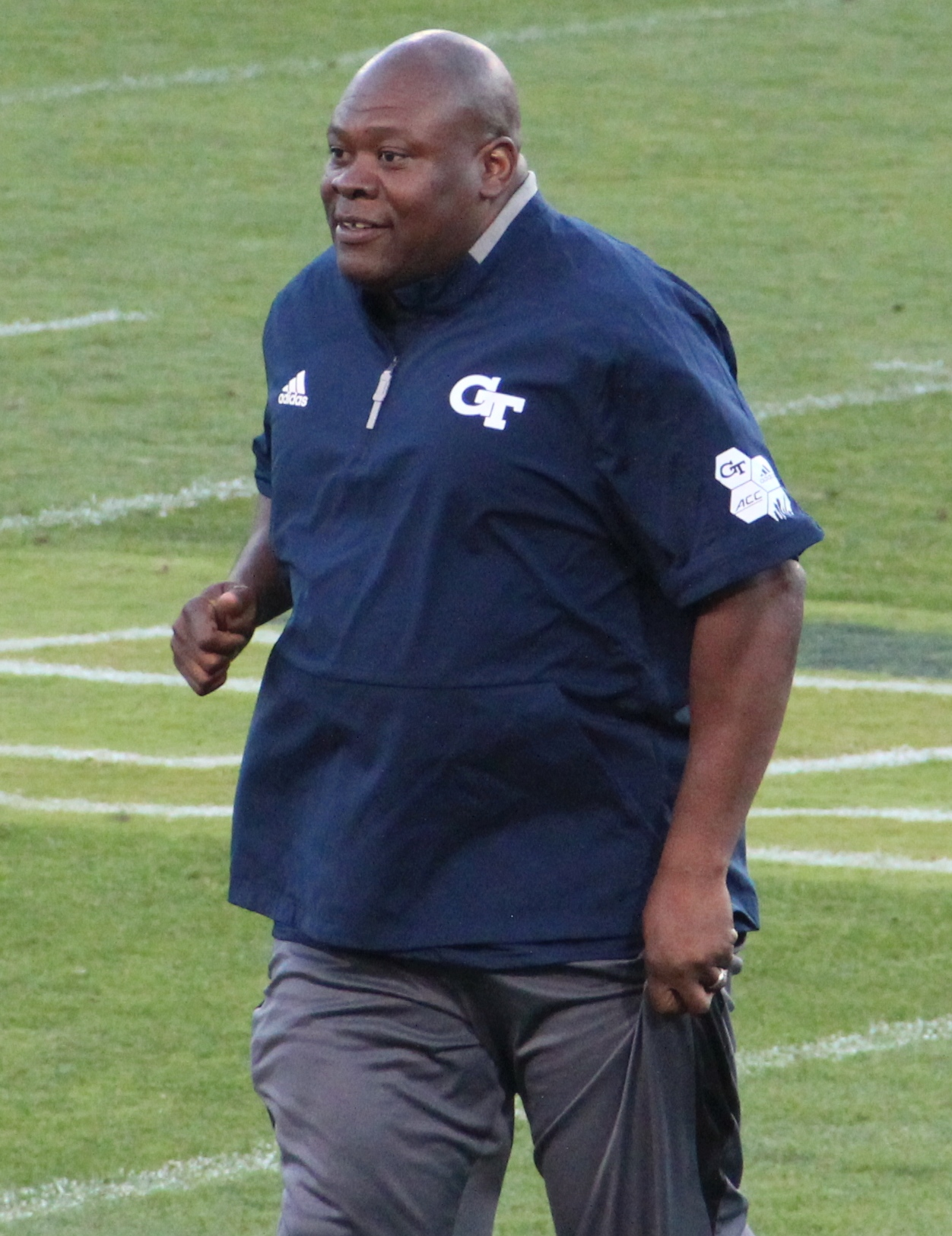
- Moore in 2019

South Carolina Gamecocks
- Title: Executive director of player and character development

Personal information
- Born: October 13, 1967 (age 59); Albany, Georgia, U.S.
- Listed height: 6 ft 0 in (1.83 m)
- Listed weight: 238 lb (108 kg)

Career information
- High school: Monroe (Albany)
- College: Northeastern State
- NFL draft: 1992: 8th round, 216th overall pick

Career history

Playing
- Atlanta Falcons (1992); Detroit Lions (1993–1994); San Francisco 49ers (1995)*; Carolina Panthers (1995); Detroit Lions (1996)*; Arizona Cardinals (1996–1997)
- * Offseason or practice squad member only

Coaching
- Morehouse College (1998–2000) Running backs coach, Special Teams coordinator; Georgia Tech (2001–2020) Team chaplain, character development; South Carolina (2021–present) Executive director of player and character development

Career NFL statistics
- Rushing yards: 1,197
- Rushing average: 3.9
- Rushing touchdowns: 11
- Receptions: 26
- Receiving yards: 191
- Receiving touchdowns: 1
- Stats at Pro Football Reference

Derrick Moore (born October 13, 1967) is an American former professional football player who was a running back for three seasons in the National Football League (NFL) for the Detroit Lions and Carolina Panthers. He played college football for the Northeastern State RiverHawks and was selected in the eighth round of the 1992 NFL draft with the 216th overall pick by the Atlanta Falcons. Moore has served as the team chaplain for the Georgia Tech Yellow Jackets football team. Moore set the NAIA single season rushing record in 1991.

Moore was featured in the TV Land reality series The Big 4-0 in 2008. Moore has served as the team chaplain for the Georgia Tech Yellow Jackets football team, often delivering pre-game motivational speeches to the players. Moore also filmed motivational speeches for the Atlanta Falcons during their 2017 playoff run.

Pre-draft measurables
Height	Weight	Arm length	Hand span	40-yard dash	10-yard split	20-yard split	Bench press
5 ft 11 1/2 in (1.82 m)	216 lb (98 kg)	31 1/2 in (0.80 m)	8 5/8 in (0.22 m)	4.62 s	1.64 s	2.68 s	20 reps
All values from NFL Combine
