= Jamal Fountaine =

American football player (born 1971)

No. 52, 53
- Position: Defensive end

Personal information
- Born: January 29, 1971 (age 55); San Francisco, California, U.S.
- Listed height: 6 ft 3 in (1.91 m)
- Listed weight: 240 lb (109 kg)

Career information
- College: Washington
- NFL draft: 1994: undrafted

Career history
- San Francisco 49ers (1994–1995); Carolina Panthers (1995–1996); Atlanta Falcons (1997)

Awards and highlights
- Super Bowl champion (XXIX); National champion (1991)
- Stats at Pro Football Reference

Jamal Fountaine (born January 29, 1971) is a former NFL defensive end.

== High school ==
Fountain attended Lincoln High School in San Francisco, California where he ran track and played basketball, playing football beginning in his junior year.

== Collegiate career ==
Fountaine played defensive end for the Washington Huskies and was a starter for the 1992 and 1993 seasons and letterman from 1990 to 1993.

In 1989, he was awarded the team's Mark Drennan Memorial Award as special teams scout squad MVP, also later awarded to his younger brother Matt Fountaine in 2002. He played in the Rose Bowl as a member of 1990, 1991, and 1992 teams. He finished his career as a team captain during the 1993 season, which concluded with the 1994 Hula Bowl.

Fountaine earned a construction engineering degree at Washington.

== NFL career ==
He was not selected in the 1994 NFL draft, but signed as a free agent with the San Francisco 49ers where he spent two seasons including their 1995 Super Bowl team. He later was a member of the Carolina Panthers and Atlanta Falcons.

== Post-NFL career ==
Fountaine became a graduate assistant at Washington in 2002 and then joined Portland State in 2003. In 2008, Fountaine became a firefighter for the Alameda County Fire Department.
