= Willie Green (American football) =

American football player (born 1966)

No. 86, 82, 85
- Position: Wide receiver

Personal information
- Born: April 2, 1966 (age 60); Athens, Georgia, U.S.
- Listed height: 6 ft 4 in (1.93 m)
- Listed weight: 195 lb (88 kg)

Career information
- High school: Clarke Central (Athens)
- College: Mississippi
- NFL draft: 1990: 8th round, 194th overall pick

Career history
- Detroit Lions (1990–1993); Tampa Bay Buccaneers (1994); Carolina Panthers (1995–1996); Denver Broncos (1997–1998); Miami Dolphins (1999)*
- * Offseason or practice squad member only

Awards and highlights
- 2× Super Bowl champion (XXXII, XXXIII); Second-team All-SEC (1989)

Career NFL statistics
- Receptions: 237
- Receiving yards: 3,720
- Receiving touchdowns: 26
- Stats at Pro Football Reference

Willie Aaron Green (born April 2, 1966) is an American former professional football player who was a wide receiver for the Detroit Lions, Tampa Bay Buccaneers, Carolina Panthers, and Denver Broncos in the National Football League (NFL). He played college football for the Ole Miss Rebels.

== Early life ==
Green was born April 2, 1966, in Athens, Georgia, to politically active parents Willie and Corene. He played football in 1984 and 1985 at Clarke Central, where he was not widely considered the best player on either team. Green himself admitted "I couldn't compete with them... The bottom line is I never thought I would play a professional sport in anything." He transferred to the Tennessee Military Institute for his senior year.

== College career ==
Green decided not to return to Athens and the University of Georgia, instead attending Ole Miss. He later commented his family encouraged him to cut childhood ties, and attend school in "a small country town (Oxford, Mississippi) so the only thing you could do was get your education and go to school. There wasn't enough room for trouble." The lack of distractions paid off. After a 200-yard freshman season in 1986, Green led the Rebels in receiving yards each of the next three seasons, including a then-record 816 yards his senior year in tandem with future pro-bowl tight end Wesley Walls to finish his career with a then-school-record 2,274 yards. He was in the SEC's top 10 each of these three years in receptions, receiving yards, and receiving touchdowns, and was named second-team All-SEC as a senior. As of 2017, he ranks 6th in career receiving yards, 7th for a single season, and 9th in career touchdowns.

Ole Miss statistics

| Year | G | Rec | Yds | Avg | TD |
|---|---|---|---|---|---|
| 1986 | 10 | 13 | 222 | 17.1 | 2 |
| 1987 | 11 | 34 | 588 | 17.3 | 3 |
| 1988 | 11 | 38 | 648 | 17.1 | 4 |
| 1989 | 11 | 41 | 816 | 19.9 | 3 |
| Career | 0 | 126 | 2274 | 18 | 12 |

== Professional career ==
Pre-draft measurables
| Height | Weight | Arm length | Hand span | 40-yard dash | 10-yard split | 20-yard split | 20-yard shuttle | Vertical jump |
|---|---|---|---|---|---|---|---|---|
| 6 ft 2 1/4 in (1.89 m) | 179 lb (81 kg) | 31 in (0.79 m) | 8 1/2 in (0.22 m) | 4.60 s | 1.66 s | 2.73 s | 4.12 s | 31.5 in (0.80 m) |

Green nearly went undrafted in 1990, finally being selected by the Detroit Lions in the eighth round (194th overall). A shoulder injury side-lined him his entire first season. However, in 1991 he emerged as the team's leading touchdown receiver with seven touchdowns, and finished third in yardage as part of a balanced receiving trio with Brett Perriman and Robert Clark. In the first round of the playoffs, Green had 8 receptions for 115 yards and 2 touchdowns in a win over the Dallas Cowboys. Despite consistent play in the three seasons from 1991 to 1993, he was always overshadowed by all-star running back Barry Sanders and other receivers. "I've never been a superstar on any team... Every team I've been on, I've had to fight to stay alive," Green commented in 2000. With the emergence of Herman Moore, Green was cut.

He was signed to a one-year deal by Tampa Bay, where he had just 9 receptions in five appearances coming off the bench.

In 1995, the brand-new Carolina Panthers claimed him prior to the expansion team's first season. Despite starting only seven games, Green amassed 882 yards and a team-leading 6 touchdown receptions. In game 15 against Atlanta, he caught 89 yard game-winning touchdown (the second longest in team history) as part of a record-setting 36.8 yards-per-catch afternoon, and his fourth 100+ yard receiving game of the season. His 18.77 yards per reception in 1995 is still a franchise record as of 2017. Green recorded 46 receptions and 614 yards in 10 starts in the 1996 season.

Green finished his career in grand style, winning two Super Bowls with the Denver Broncos in 1997 and 1998. He started just two games, and contributed just three post-season receptions to the two championship runs.

NFL statistics

| Year | Tm | G | GS | Rec | Yds | Y/R | TD | Lng | Y/G | Fmb |
|---|---|---|---|---|---|---|---|---|---|---|
| 1991 | DET | 16 | 15 | 39 | 592 | 15.2 | 7 | 73 | 37 | 0 |
| 1992 | DET | 15 | 13 | 33 | 586 | 17.8 | 5 | 73 | 39.1 | 1 |
| 1993 | DET | 16 | 6 | 28 | 462 | 16.5 | 2 | 47 | 28.9 | 0 |
| 1994 | TAM | 5 | 0 | 9 | 150 | 16.7 | 0 | 28 | 30 | 0 |
| 1995 | CAR | 16 | 7 | 47 | 882 | 18.8 | 6 | 89 | 55.1 | 1 |
| 1996 | CAR | 15 | 10 | 46 | 614 | 13.3 | 3 | 50 | 40.9 | 0 |
| 1997 | DEN | 16 | 1 | 19 | 240 | 12.6 | 2 | 31 | 15 | 0 |
| 1998 | DEN | 15 | 1 | 16 | 194 | 12.1 | 1 | 50 | 12.9 | 0 |
| Career | | 114 | 53 | 237 | 3,720 | 15.7 | 26 | 89 | 32.6 | 2 |

== Personal life ==
Green was active in his community as a teen, college player, and professional, contributing to community causes in his home of Athens, Georgia. His unusual civic involvement earned him the nickname "The Mayor of Shelby" during his time with the Carolina Panthers. He worked for several years as the owner of a local golf course and owner of a small check-cashing franchise. In 2011, he returned to college at Gardner–Webb University, finishing the last 30 credit hours of a degree he began at Ole Miss. Following graduation, he became a vice-president of the lender World Acceptance Corporation.

His son, Javarius, followed in his footsteps in football, and is a wide receiver for the Boston College Eagles.
