= Eric Guliford =

American football player (born 1969)

No. 84, 94, 80
- Position: Wide receiver

Personal information
- Born: October 25, 1969 (age 57); Kansas City, Kansas, U.S.
- Listed height: 5 ft 8 in (1.73 m)
- Listed weight: 170 lb (77 kg)

Career information
- High school: Peoria (Peoria, Arizona)
- College: Arizona State
- NFL draft: 1993: undrafted
- Expansion draft: 1995: 32nd round, 63rd overall pick

Career history
- Minnesota Vikings (1993–1994); Carolina Panthers (1995); Winnipeg Blue Bombers (1996); New Orleans Saints (1997–1998); Saskatchewan Roughriders (1999–2001); Las Vegas Outlaws (2001)

Awards and highlights
- 2× Second-team All-Pac-10 (1991, 1992)

Career NFL statistics
- Receptions: 67
- Receiving yards: 975
- Receiving touchdowns: 2
- Stats at Pro Football Reference

Eric Andre Guliford (born October 25, 1969) is an American former professional football player who was a wide receiver for five seasons in the National Football League (NFL) and four seasons in the Canadian Football League (CFL). He played college football for the Arizona State Sun Devils and was selected by the Carolina Panthers in the 1995 NFL expansion draft.

== 1993 ==
In 1993, as a rookie free agent who made the Minnesota Vikings roster, he entered a game vs the Green Bay Packers with 14 seconds left and the Vikings trailing by 1 from midfield and managed to get wide open down the right sideline where Jim McMahon found him all alone for a 45-yard pass that he caught, going out of bounds at the 5 yard line to set up a game winning field goal by Fuad Reveiz with six seconds left.
