= Doug Pederson =

American football player and coach (born 1968)

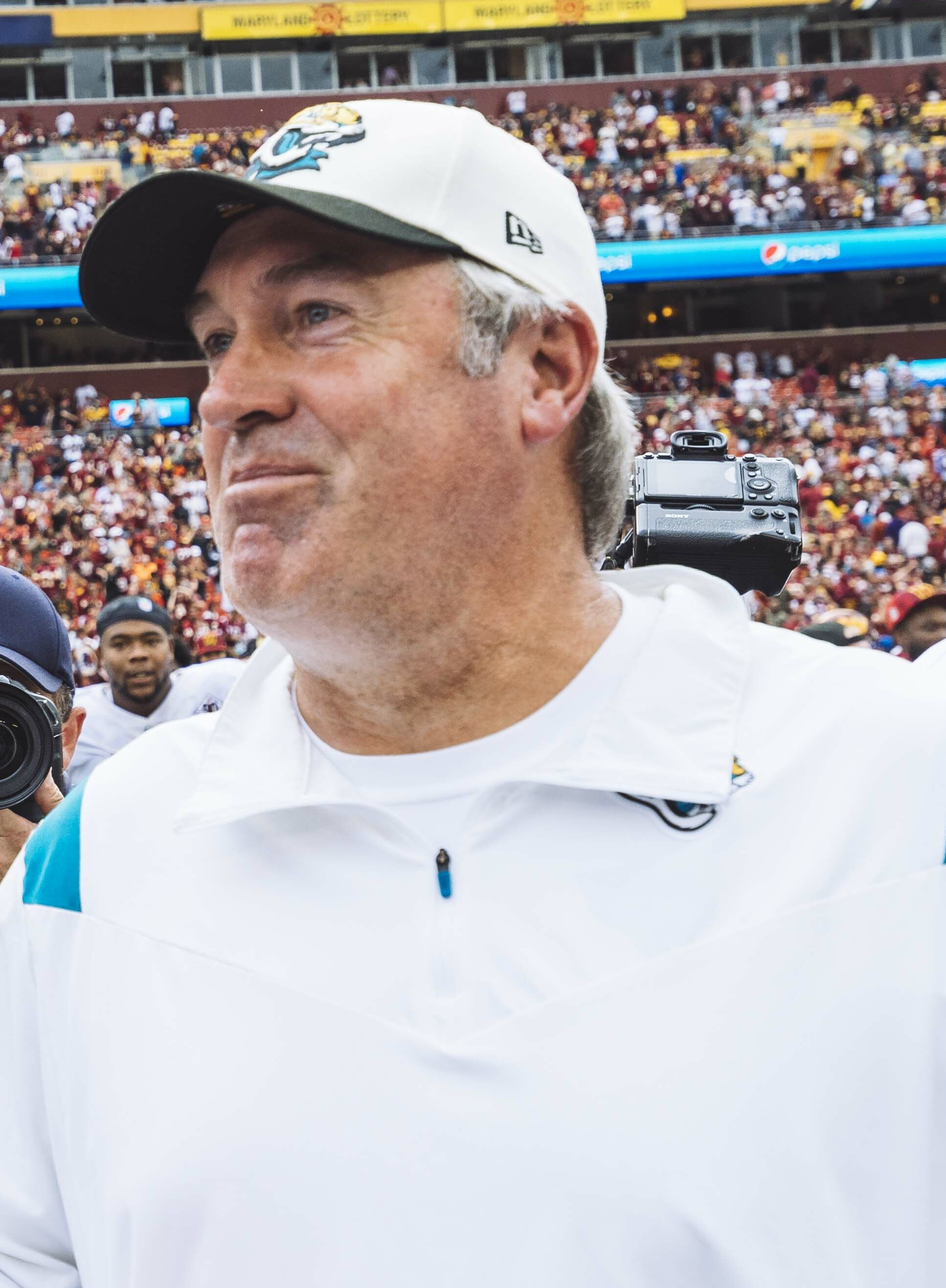
- Pederson with the Jacksonville Jaguars in 2022

No. 14, 18
- Position: Quarterback

Personal information
- Born: January 31, 1968 (age 58); Bellingham, Washington, U.S.
- Listed height: 6 ft 3 in (1.91 m)
- Listed weight: 222 lb (101 kg)

Career information
- High school: Ferndale (Ferndale, Washington)
- College: Northeast Louisiana (1987–1990)
- NFL draft: 1991: undrafted
- Expansion draft: 1995: 22nd round, 44th overall pick

Career history

Playing
- Miami Dolphins (1991)*; New York/New Jersey Knights (1992); Miami Dolphins (1993–1994); Carolina Panthers (1995)*; Rhein Fire (1995); Miami Dolphins (1995); Green Bay Packers (1995–1998); Philadelphia Eagles (1999); Cleveland Browns (2000); Green Bay Packers (2001–2004)
- * Offseason or practice squad member only

Coaching
- Calvary Baptist Academy (LA) (2005–2008) Head coach; Philadelphia Eagles (2009–2010) Offensive quality control coach; Philadelphia Eagles (2011–2012) Quarterbacks coach; Kansas City Chiefs (2013–2015) Offensive coordinator; Philadelphia Eagles (2016–2020) Head coach; Jacksonville Jaguars (2022–2024) Head coach

Awards and highlights
- As player: Super Bowl champion (XXXI); FCS national champion (1987); As coach: Super Bowl champion (LII); Greasy Neale Award (2017)

Career NFL statistics
- Passing attempts: 522
- Passing completions: 286
- Completion percentage: 54.7%
- TD–INT: 12–19
- Passing yards: 2,762
- Passer rating: 62.3
- Stats at Pro Football Reference

Head coaching record
- Regular season: NFL: 64–66–1 (.492)
- Postseason: NFL: 5–3 (.625)
- Career: NFL: 69–69–1 (.500); High school: 40–11 (.784)
- Coaching profile at Pro Football Reference

Douglas Irvin Pederson (born January 31, 1968) is an American professional football coach and former quarterback in the National Football League (NFL) who was the head coach of the Philadelphia Eagles from 2016 to 2020 and Jacksonville Jaguars from 2022 to 2024. He spent most of his 13-season playing career as a backup to Brett Favre on the Green Bay Packers, where he was a member of the team that won Super Bowl XXXI. Pederson was also a backup to Dan Marino on the Miami Dolphins and a starter for the Philadelphia Eagles and Cleveland Browns until retiring in 2004.

Pederson began his coaching career under Andy Reid, serving as an assistant for the Eagles from 2009 to 2012. After Reid became the head coach of the Kansas City Chiefs in 2013, Pederson followed him to serve as the Chiefs' offensive coordinator. Pederson returned to the Eagles as their head coach in 2016, a position he held for five seasons. His most successful season with the Eagles was in 2017 when the team won Super Bowl LII, the franchise's first Super Bowl title. As the head coach of the Jaguars for three seasons, Pederson led them to a division title and playoff victory in 2022.

== Playing career ==
=== Early life ===
Pederson was born in Bellingham, Washington, in 1968. He was raised in nearby Ferndale, Washington, and attended Ferndale High School, and was an All-State selection in football, basketball, and baseball. His quarterback coach at Ferndale was Ray Ramsay. After high school, Pederson graduated from Northeast Louisiana University, where he was quarterback from 1987 through 1990. Pederson still holds multiple passing records at the school.

=== Professional ===
==== Miami Dolphins ====
Pederson originally signed as a rookie free agent by the Miami Dolphins on May 1, 1991, out of Northeast Louisiana University (now University of Louisiana at Monroe) in Monroe, Louisiana. He was waived on August 17, 1991, before the start of the regular season. After spending the 1991 season as a free agent, the New York/New Jersey Knights of the World League of American Football (WLAF) drafted Pederson in the fifth round for the first pool of draft-eligible players on February 4, 1992. The second pool, which was drafted from on February 20, consisted of players allocated by NFL teams to the league. He was the backup quarterback to Reggie Slack with the Knights from March to May 1992.

After the WLAF season finished, Pederson was re-signed by the Dolphins on June 2, 1992. He spent 1992 training camp with the Dolphins, before being released during final roster cuts again. Pederson was subsequently re-signed to the team's practice squad, where he practiced on the scout team until he was waived on October 8, 1992.

Pederson was re-signed by the Dolphins after the season on March 3, 1993. After his third training camp with the Dolphins, Pederson was waived again on August 31. The next day, he was re-signed to the practice squad. Dan Marino, the Dolphins' starting quarterback since 1983, ruptured his Achilles' tendon against the Cleveland Browns on October 10, 1993, forcing backup Scott Mitchell to replace him. Pederson replaced Marino on the active roster and served as Mitchell's backup for the next four games. Pederson made his NFL debut on October 24 against the Indianapolis Colts. He helped head coach Don Shula win his NFL-record 325th victory as a coach when Mitchell suffered a separated shoulder against the Philadelphia Eagles on November 14. In that record-breaking game for Coach Shula, Pederson entered in the third quarter of the game and went 3 for 6 for 34 yards while converting several crucial third downs. Pederson was able to steer the Dolphins to the win. Pederson also served as the backup to recently acquired Steve DeBerg for the three games Mitchell missed with injury. He briefly entered a week 14 game against the New York Giants while DeBerg was receiving stitches on his face. Mitchell returned as the Dolphins' starter after Week 15, and Pederson was released in favor of backup DeBerg and third-string quarterback Hugh Millen on December 16, 1993.

Pederson re-signed with the Dolphins on April 16, 1994, after the season ended. He spent the entire 1994 season on the Dolphins' active roster as the third-string quarterback behind Marino and Bernie Kosar.

On February 15, 1995, Pederson was selected by the Carolina Panthers in the twenty-second round of the NFL expansion draft, after being placed on the Dolphins' available players list on January 19, but was released on May 24. He returned to the World League after his release, playing with the Rhein Fire. Pederson re-signed with the Dolphins again in June 1995. After competing with Dan McGwire throughout training camp, Pederson was waived on August 22. Marino suffered a knee injury during a week 6 game, so Pederson was re-signed on October 10 to serve as the third quarterback behind Kosar and McGwire for the next two games. He was released again after Marino returned on October 24.

==== Green Bay Packers (first stint) ====
Pederson worked out for the Green Bay Packers following Week 10 in 1995, due to a season-ending injury suffered by backup Ty Detmer and a minor injury sustained by starter Brett Favre. Third-string quarterback T. J. Rubley was forced to play in week 10 and threw a game-ending interception after calling an audible, going against head coach Mike Holmgren's playcall. The Packers signed Bob Gagliano to serve as the third-stringer quarterback for weeks 11 and 12. Pederson replaced Gagliano as the third-string quarterback when he signed with the Packers on November 22, 1995. The Packers claimed Jim McMahon off waivers from the Browns to serve as Favre's backup ahead of Pederson and Rubley on November 29. Rubley was waived on December 13, leaving McMahon and Pederson as Favre's backups. Favre did not miss any games, so Pederson did not see any game action for the Packers in 1995.

Pederson served as the third quarterback behind Favre and McMahon in 1996, playing in one game but recorded no statistics. He received a Super Bowl ring following the Packers' win over the Patriots in Super Bowl XXXI. He re-signed with the Packers with a two-year contract on February 20, 1997. Pederson was again the third quarterback throughout 1997, backing up Favre and Steve Bono. Pederson beat out Rick Mirer for the backup job to Favre, as well as the primary placekick holder job, in 1998. During a Week 5 loss to the Minnesota Vikings, Pederson replaced Favre in the last five minutes of a blowout game and threw two touchdowns in his place. However, Pederson suffered a broken jaw that knocked him out for the team's next four games.

==== Philadelphia Eagles ====
Pederson signed a three-year, $4.5 million contract with the Philadelphia Eagles on February 18, 1999, to become the team's starting quarterback under new head coach Andy Reid, who was Pederson's quarterbacks coach in Green Bay from 1997 to 1998. The Eagles drafted Donovan McNabb with the second overall pick in the 1999 NFL draft in April 1999, and Reid said Pederson would remain the starter until McNabb was ready to play.

In his nine starts for the Eagles, Pederson had a 2–7 record, a 51.6% completion rate, 1,168 passing yards, six touchdowns, and nine interceptions. In his first career start, a Week 1 game against the Arizona Cardinals, Pederson threw two touchdowns in the first quarter to help give the Eagles a 21–0 lead. The Cardinals came back, however, and won the game on a field goal as time expired, 25–24. Pederson went 12-for-25 for 91 yards and two touchdowns in the game. McNabb replaced Pederson, who suffered a bruised throwing shoulder, after one half in a Week 2 loss to the Tampa Bay Buccaneers, in which Pederson went 12-of-19 for 100 yards and an interception. Pederson started a Week 3 shutout loss (26–0) to the Buffalo Bills, going 14-of-26 for 137 yards and two lost fumbles, before being replaced by McNabb again in the fourth quarter. During a Week 4 loss to the New York Giants, Pederson went 6-for-15 for 75 yards and two interceptions before being replaced by McNabb after halftime. Pederson's first NFL win came in Week 5 against the Dallas Cowboys. He played the entire game, going 11-of-29 for 145 yards, a touchdown, and an interception. Pederson played the entirety of the next three games, posting a 1–2 record while throwing three touchdowns and three interceptions. In his final start as an Eagle, Pederson was benched at halftime of a week 9 game against the Carolina Panthers after going 3-of-9 for 28 yards and being down 23–0. He did not see game action at quarterback again until a week 14 game against the Cowboys in which McNabb suffered an injury in the fourth quarter. Pederson went 8-for-12 for 108 yards and a touchdown in the loss, and Koy Detmer received the start ahead of him in week 15 with McNabb still injured. After Pederson spent the next season's training camp with the team, the Eagles released him on August 28, 2000.

==== Cleveland Browns ====
Pederson considered retirement after being released by the Eagles, but instead signed a two-year contract with the Cleveland Browns on September 2, 2000. The Browns' backup, Ty Detmer, suffered a season-ending injury, and the Browns needed a backup quarterback to starter Tim Couch. This was the second time in Pederson's career that he was signed to replace an injured Ty Detmer. Pederson started as the third quarterback behind Couch and Spergon Wynn, until Couch suffered a season-ending injury in week 7. Pederson started the next six games, posting a 1–5 record. During Week 13 against the Baltimore Ravens, he was knocked out of the game with bruised ribs and replaced with Wynn. Wynn started the next week against the Jacksonville Jaguars, but he suffered a season-ending injury and Pederson replaced him. Pederson returned for the final two games of the season, losing both, including a 35–24 loss to his former team, the Eagles, and a 24–0 shutout loss to the Tennessee Titans.

Pederson was released after the season on February 22, 2001.

==== Green Bay Packers (second stint) ====
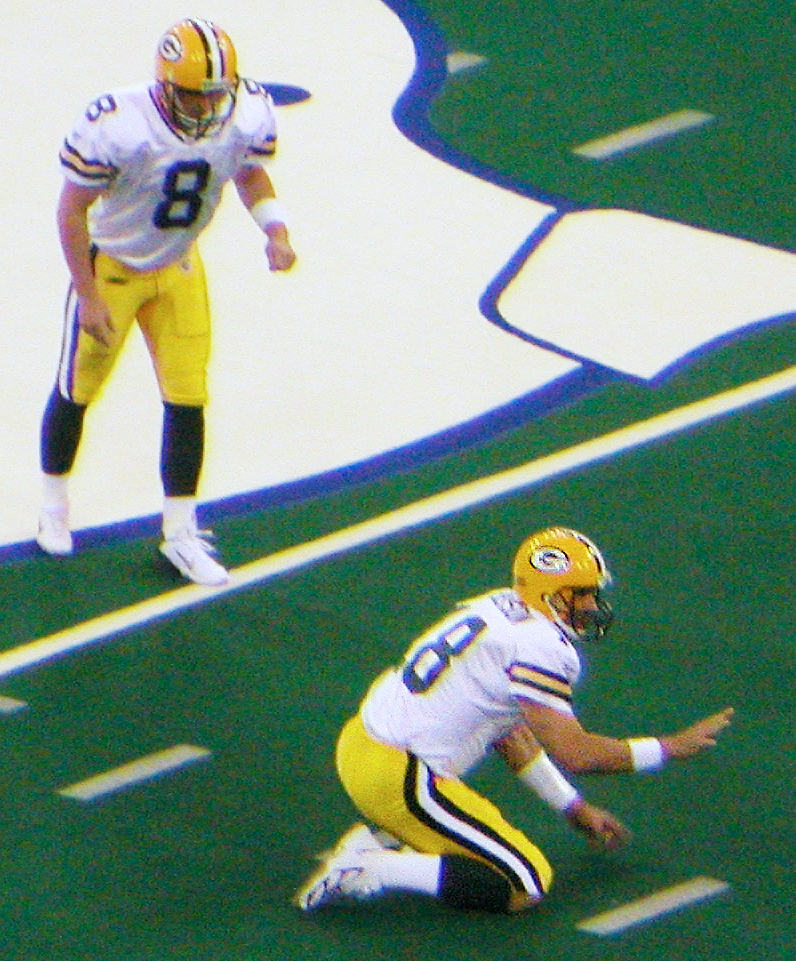
Pederson (right) gets ready to hold a kick for Ryan Longwell (left) in 2004

The Packers re-signed Pederson to a one-year contract on March 13, 2001, to replace backup Matt Hasselbeck, who was traded to the Seattle Seahawks. Pederson was the primary backup to Favre for the entire 2001 season, and was the primary placekick holder in every game.

Pederson was re-signed to a one-year, $650,000 contract with the Packers on April 2, 2002. Pederson again was the backup quarterback and primary holder in all 16 games in 2002. In a week 7 game against the Washington Redskins, Favre suffered a sprained knee, and Pederson took most of the snaps in the second half, going 9-for-15 for 78 yards to help win the game 30–9. Pederson also played in games against the Miami Dolphins, Detroit Lions, and New York Jets. He re-signed with the Packers to a one-year, $750,000 contract on April 29, 2003. For the third consecutive season, Pederson backed up Favre in all 16 games and held placekicks. He completed both of his passes during the regular season for a total of 16 yards.

The Packers re-signed Pederson to a one-year contract on April 28, 2004. Tim Couch was signed to compete for the backup quarterback job, but lost out to Pederson and was released on September 5, 2004. In a week 3 game against the Indianapolis Colts, Pederson replaced Favre in a blowout loss and went 4-of-6 for 34 yards and an interception. The next week, a week 4 game against the New York Giants, Favre sustained a concussion in the third quarter, and Pederson replaced him at quarterback. Pederson went 7-of-17 for 86 yards and an interception in the loss before he suffered a hit to his side in the third quarter that resulted in a cracked bone in his back, a torn muscle in his side, and a broken rib. He stayed in the game up until the last snap, when he was replaced by third-string quarterback Craig Nall. Pederson was placed on injured reserve on October 7, ending his season.

Pederson retired in March 2005 to become a head coach at Calvary Baptist Academy.

== NFL career statistics ==
Legend
	Won the Super Bowl
**Bold**	Career high

=== Regular season ===
Year	Team	Games			Passing								Rushing				Sacked		Fumbles
Year	Team	GP	GS	Record	Cmp	Att	Pct	Yds	Avg	TD	Int	Rtg	Att	Yds	Avg	TD	Sck	SckY	Fum
1993	MIA	7	0	–	4	8	50.0	41	5.1	0	0	65.1	2	−1	−0.5	0	1	4	2
1994	MIA	0	0	–	DNP														
1995	MIA	0	0	–	DNP														
1995	GB	0	0	–	DNP														
1996	GB	1	0	–	–	0	–	–	–	–	–	–	0	–	–	–	0	–	0
1997	GB	1	0	–	–	0	–	–	–	–	–	–	3	−4	−1.3	0	0	–	0
1998	GB	12	0	–	14	24	58.3	128	5.3	2	0	**100.7**	8	−4	−0.5	0	1	7	1
1999	PHI	**16**	**9**	**2–7**	**119**	**227**	52.4	**1,276**	5.6	**7**	**9**	62.9	**20**	33	1.7	0	**20**	109	**7**
2000	CLE	11	8	1–7	117	210	55.7	1,047	5.0	2	8	56.6	18	**68**	3.8	0	17	**116**	4
2001	GB	**16**	0	–	–	0	–	–	–	–	–	–	1	−1	−1.0	0	0	–	0
2002	GB	**16**	0	–	19	28	67.9	134	5.5	1	0	90.5	1	−1	−1.0	0	1	8	0
2003	GB	**16**	0	–	2	2	**100.0**	16	**8.0**	0	0	100.0	6	−5	−0.8	0	0	–	0
2004	GB	4	0	–	11	23	47.8	120	5.2	0	2	27.4	2	15	**7.5**	0	0	–	0
Career		100	17	3–14	286	522	54.8	2,762	5.3	12	19	62.3	61	100	1.6	0	40	244	14

=== Postseason ===
Year	Team	Games			Passing								Rushing				Sacked		Fumbles
Year	Team	GP	GS	Record	Cmp	Att	Pct	Yds	Avg	TD	Int	Rtg	Att	Yds	Avg	TD	Sck	SckY	Fum
1994	MIA	0	0	–	DNP														
1995	GB	0	0	–	DNP														
1996	GB	0	0	–	DNP														
1997	GB	0	0	–	DNP														
1998	GB	0	0	–	DNP														
2001	GB	**1**	0	–	–	0	–	–	–	–	–	–	**1**	−1	−1.0	0	0	–	0
2002	GB	0	0	–	DNP														
2003	GB	0	0	–	DNP														
2004	GB	0	0	–	Did not play due to injury														
Career		0	0	0–0	0	0	0.0	0	0.0	0	0	0.0	1	-1	-1.0	0	0	0	0

== Coaching career ==
=== Calvary Baptist Academy ===
After his retirement, Pederson was hired as head coach of Calvary Baptist Academy, a private Christian high school in Shreveport, Louisiana. Calvary was going into its second year as a program when Pederson signed on in March 2005.

Pederson was the head coach at Calvary for four years, and held a 33–7 record in the regular season and an 8–3 record in the post-season. The Cavaliers were in the state playoffs all four years with Pederson as head coach. In his first season in 2005, the Cavaliers went 5–6 and lost in the first round of the state playoffs. In 2007, he led the Cavaliers to the semi-finals and to their first district title.

=== Philadelphia Eagles (assistant) ===
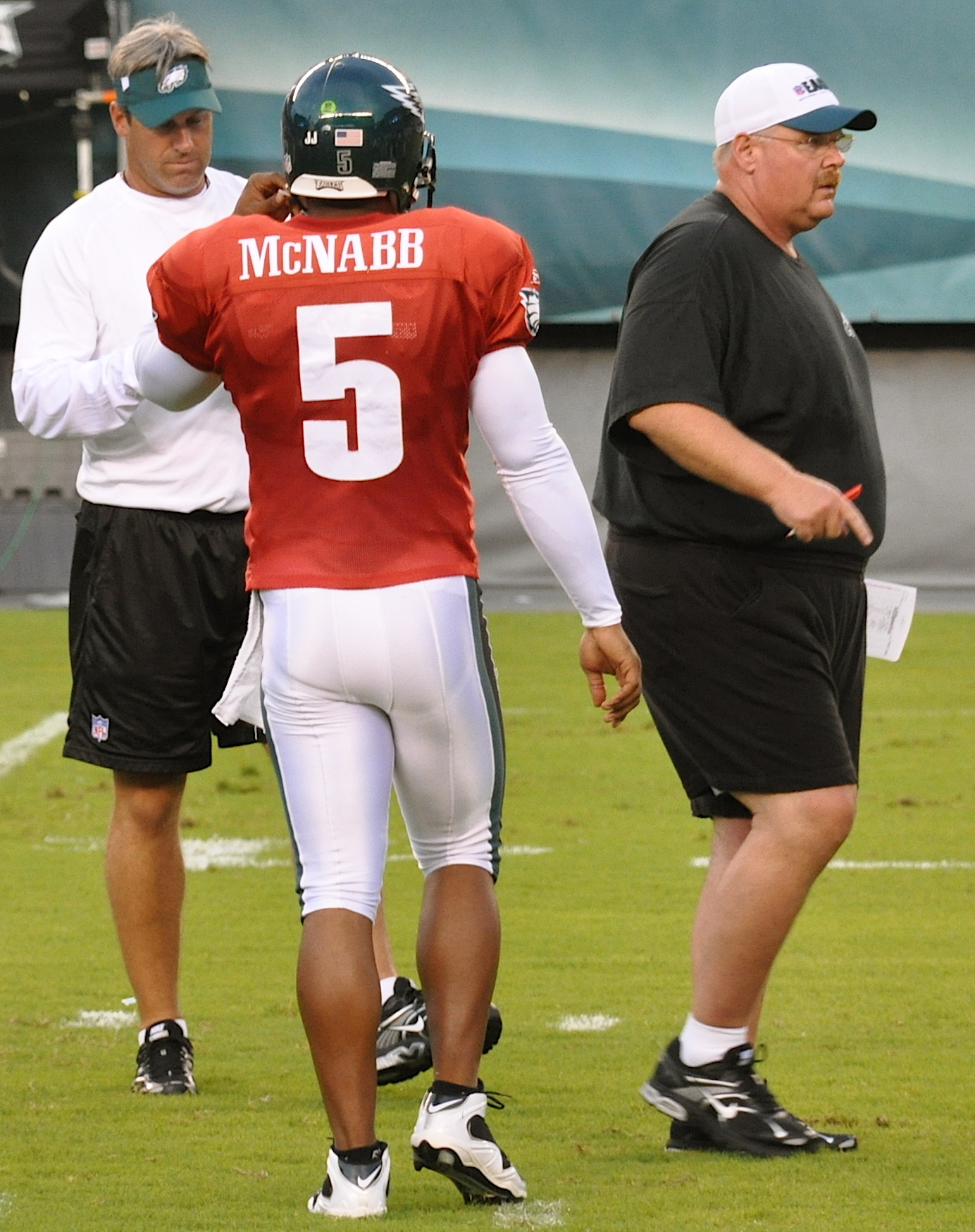
Pederson alongside Andy Reid and Donovan McNabb

On January 29, 2009, Pederson was hired as the offensive quality control coach for the Philadelphia Eagles, reuniting him with his former head coach, Andy Reid. He was promoted to quarterbacks coach on February 8, 2011, replacing James Urban, who was promoted to assistant offensive coordinator.

=== Kansas City Chiefs ===
On January 11, 2013, Pederson followed Andy Reid to the Kansas City Chiefs to serve as offensive coordinator. Following a 1–5 start in 2015, Andy Reid gave Pederson play-calling duties. The Chiefs proceeded to win their last 10 games, which made Pederson a head coaching candidate for 2016.

=== Philadelphia Eagles (head coach) ===
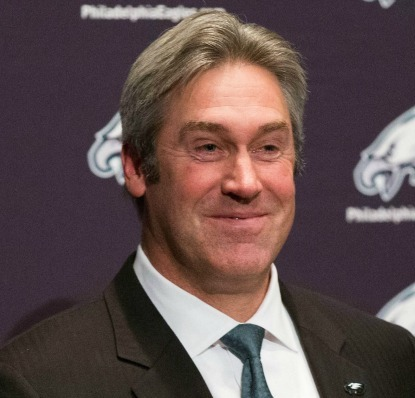
Pederson at his introductory press conference with the Eagles in January 2016

==== 2016 ====
On January 18, 2016, Pederson was hired as head coach of the Eagles replacing Chip Kelly. Despite having Sam Bradford on the roster as the starting quarterback, the Eagles drafted Carson Wentz with the second overall pick in 2016. Right before the 2016 season began, Bradford was traded to the Minnesota Vikings and Wentz was named the starting quarterback as a rookie. Pederson and Wentz won their first three NFL games together, but finished the season 7–9, missing the playoffs.

==== 2017 ====
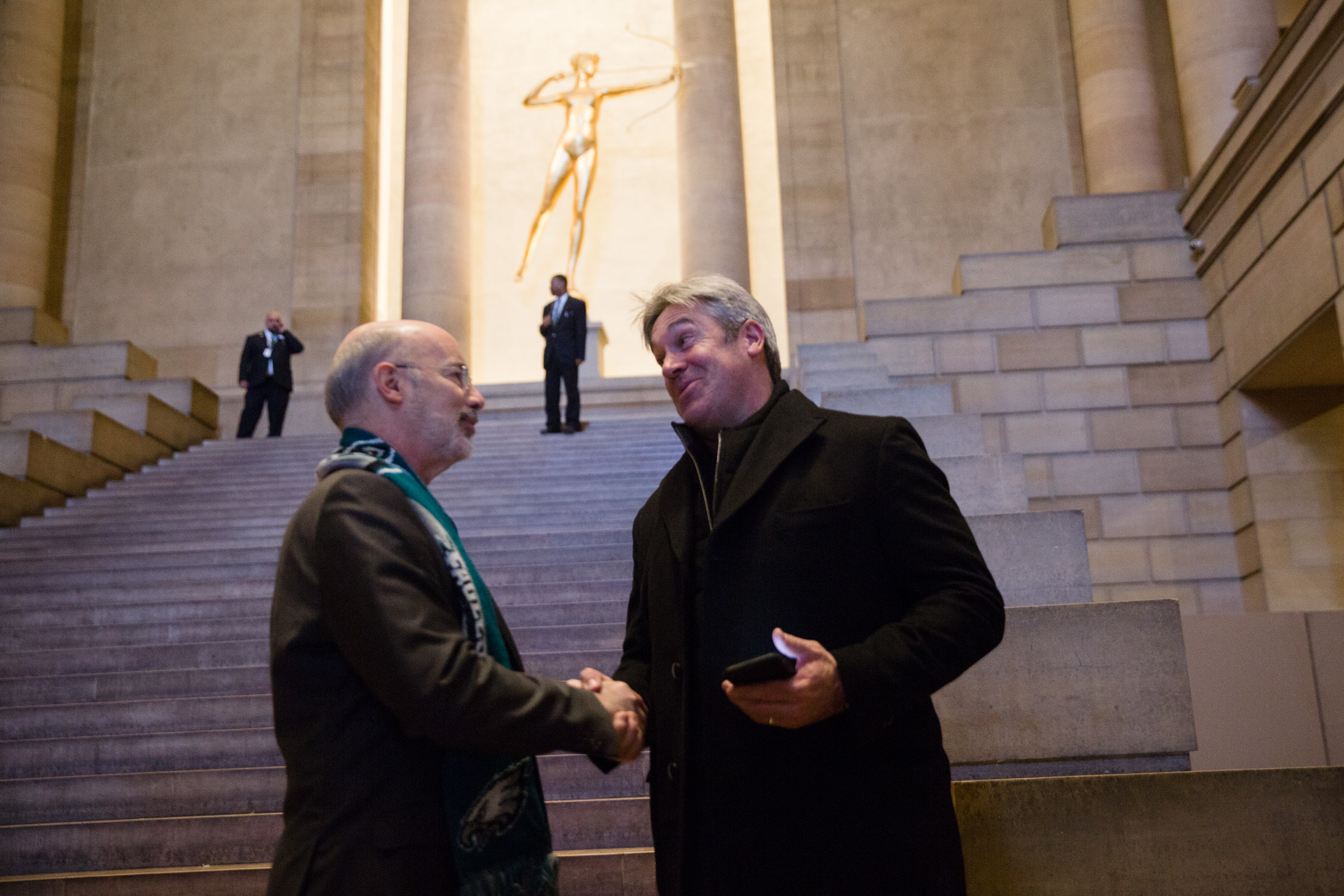
Pederson meeting Pennsylvania Governor Tom Wolf at the Super Bowl LII Victory Parade in 2018

Pederson's second season was much more successful as he led the Eagles to a 13–3 record, winning them the NFC East division championship and allotting them home-field advantage throughout the playoffs. Wentz, who was having a career year and was considered a front runner for league MVP, tore his ACL in Week 14, leaving backup Nick Foles with the starting job for the remainder of the year. Despite the Eagles becoming major playoff underdogs due to the loss of Wentz, Foles filled in admirably as the starter, allowing Philadelphia to make it to Super Bowl LII, their first Super Bowl appearance since the 2004 season. Foles, the eventual Super Bowl MVP, led the team to a 41–33 win over the New England Patriots, giving them their first Lombardi Trophy in franchise history and their first league championship since 1960.

==== 2018 ====
On May 3, 2018, it was reported that the Philadelphia Eagles picked up Pederson's fifth-year option, allowing him to coach the team through 2020. Later on that summer, it was reported that Pederson signed a contract extension through the 2022 NFL season.

Pederson's third season was not as successful as his previous one. The Eagles struggled with many injuries to their secondary and wide receivers. After starting 4–6 in their first 10 games the Eagles proceeded to win 5 of their last 6 games including upset victories over the Los Angeles Rams and Houston Texans. After winning their last game against the Washington Redskins and the Minnesota Vikings losing to the Chicago Bears, the Eagles made it back to the playoffs with a 9–7 record as the sixth seed. The Eagles went on to upset third-seeded Chicago in a defensive showdown, 16–15. During the final ten seconds of the game, Pederson called a timeout before Bears placekicker Cody Parkey could score the game-winning field goal, negating his successful attempt. Parkey missed on his subsequent kick in a play that became known as the Double Doink, securing Philadelphia's victory. However, after a promising start to their Divisional Round game in New Orleans, the Eagles fell to the New Orleans Saints, 20–14. This was Pederson's first career postseason loss as a head coach.

==== 2019 ====
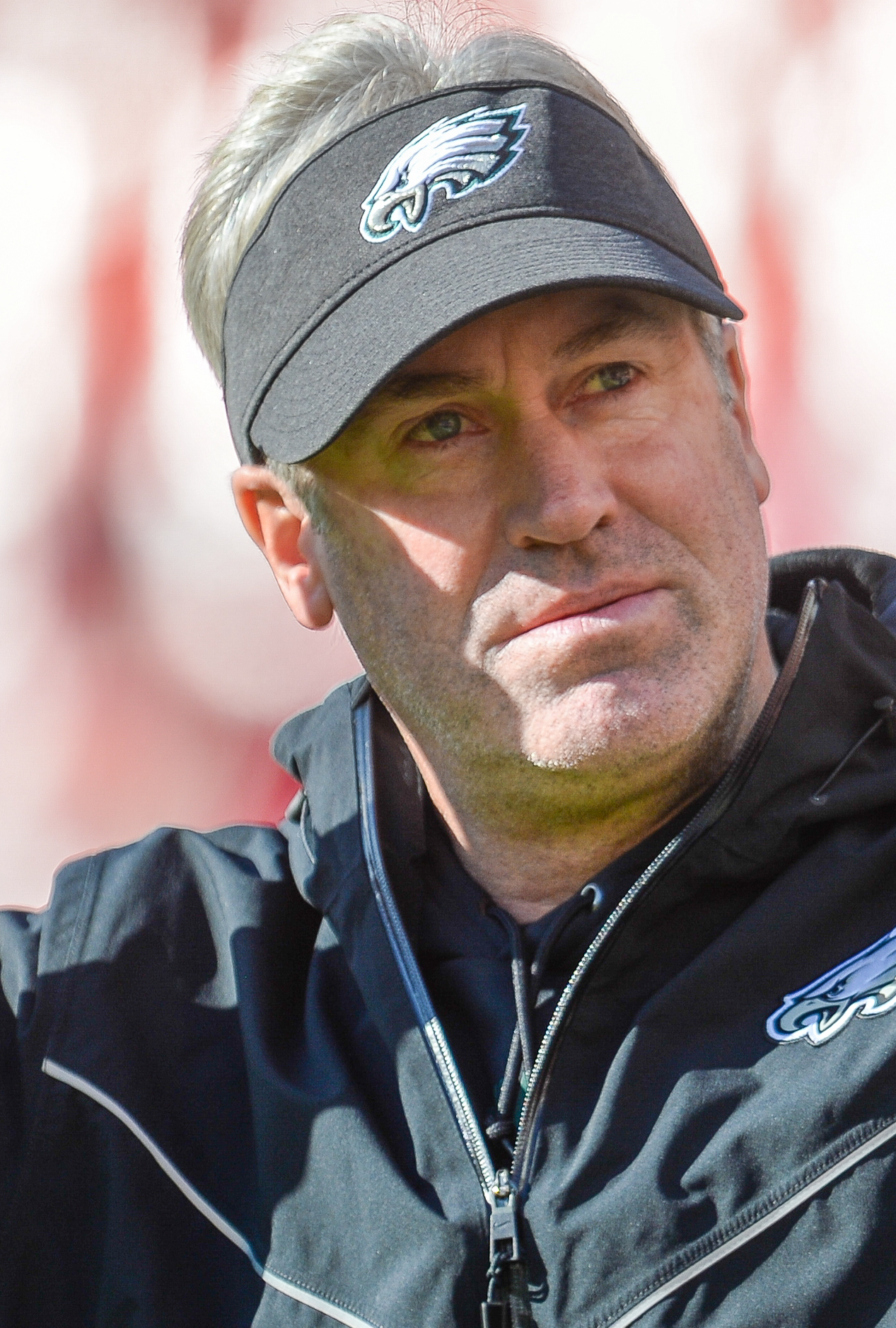
Pederson in 2019

The following season, the Eagles had multiple injuries for the second straight year. After starting 5–7 in the first 12 games, the Eagles managed to win their last four games and finished with a 9–7 record for the second consecutive year and their second NFC East division title in three years. However, the Eagles lost to the Seattle Seahawks 17–9 in the Wild Card Round.

==== 2020 ====
On August 2, 2020, Pederson tested positive for COVID-19 during training camp. He planned to communicate with the team virtually during his quarantine, and he relinquished day-to-day head coaching duties to assistant head coach Duce Staley in the interim. Pederson returned to the team on August 12. In the 2020 season, the Eagles had their third straight year of injuries, mainly on the offensive line. The Eagles reached a record 14 different offensive line combinations during the season. Pederson faced controversy during the Eagles' final game against the Washington Football Team when he pulled quarterback Jalen Hurts out for backup Nate Sudfeld in the third quarter while facing a three-point deficit. Philadelphia subsequently lost 20–14 to finish with a division-worst 4–11–1 record. Although Pederson said the decision was to give Sudfeld the opportunity to play, he was accused of deliberately losing the game to increase the Eagles' draft position.

While it was initially reported on January 2, 2021, that Pederson would return to the Eagles for the next season, it was reported on January 11 that Pederson and the Eagles organization were parting ways. Pederson finished his tenure in Philadelphia with a 42–37–1 (.531) regular season record, 4–2 (.667) playoff record and a 46–39–1 (.541) career record.

After reports that Pederson had discussions with the Seahawks about their open offensive coordinator position, it was reported that Pederson would choose to take a year off from coaching in the 2021 season. During the 2021 season, Pederson made visits to practices with the Colts and Bears and he was a contributor to The 33rd Team.

=== Jacksonville Jaguars ===
==== 2022 ====
On February 4, 2022, Pederson was hired as head coach of the Jacksonville Jaguars. His first win with the Jaguars was the Week 2 defeat of the Indianapolis Colts by 24–0. Two weeks later, Pederson returned to Lincoln Financial Field in Philadelphia for a game against his former team, the Philadelphia Eagles, who were the only remaining undefeated team that season. Despite the Jaguars getting an early 14–0 lead, the Eagles came back and won the game 29–21. After the game, Pederson did a jersey/jacket swap with Eagles center Jason Kelce. Despite starting the season 3–7, the Jaguars came out of their bye week and won six of their last seven games, finishing 9–8 and winning the division for the first time since 2017. The Jaguars became the third team since the 1970 AFL–NFL merger, along with the 2004 San Diego Chargers and the 2008 Miami Dolphins, to draft first overall and then win their division in the following season.

In the Wild Card Round against the Los Angeles Chargers, the Jaguars committed five turnovers in the first half and found themselves down 27–0 in the second quarter, but they managed to rally and win 31–30 off a field goal by Riley Patterson in the final seconds. The 27-point comeback was the third largest in NFL playoff history, and the largest in franchise history. The Jaguars also became the first team in NFL playoff history to win a playoff game with an in-game turnover margin of −5. The Jaguars saw their season end in the next round with a 27–20 loss in the Divisional Round to the Kansas City Chiefs, the eventual Super Bowl winners.

==== 2023 ====
Before Jacksonville's Week 12 matchup against the Cincinnati Bengals on Monday Night Football, their record was 8–3. The Jaguars eventually had a late-season collapse and lost four straight games. Following a loss to the Titans in Week 18, the Jaguars fell to a final record of 9–8 and missed the playoffs and the chance to win the AFC South, finishing second behind the Houston Texans.

==== 2024 ====
The Jaguars lost their first four games in 2024. After a 52–6 loss to the Detroit Lions in Week 11 fueled reporters' speculation that "the end could be nigh" for Pederson's job. He continued to coach the Jaguars but was fired the morning after the team's final game of the 4–13 season that, as reported, "fell seismically short of owner Shad Khan's expectations."

=== Since 2025 ===
Although reports indicated Pederson garnered interest as an offensive coordinator, he was not hired for the 2025 NFL season. He mainly followed teams with new coaches since they were "fascinating to me"; this included the Jaguars and his successor Liam Coen, taking interest in seeing how his offense differed from Pederson's.

In January 2026, he coached Team Makai at the Polynesian Bowl. Makai lost 14–3. Without a team for the 2026 season, Pederson was hired by CBS Sports Network as a college football color commentator.

== Personal life ==
A devout Christian, Pederson and his wife Jeannie have three sons, including Josh, also a professional football player. During his time with the Eagles, Pederson lived in Moorestown, New Jersey.

== Head coaching record ==
=== NFL ===
Team	Year	Regular season					Postseason			
Team	Year	Won	Lost	Ties	Win %	Finish	Won	Lost	Win %	Result
PHI	2016	7	9	0	.438	4th in NFC East	—	—	—	—
PHI	2017	13	3	0	.813	1st in NFC East	3	0	1.000	Super Bowl LII champions
PHI	2018	9	7	0	.563	2nd in NFC East	1	1	.500	Lost to New Orleans Saints in NFC Divisional Game
PHI	2019	9	7	0	.563	1st in NFC East	0	1	.000	Lost to Seattle Seahawks in NFC Wild Card Game
PHI	2020	4	11	1	.281	4th in NFC East	—	—	—	—
PHI total		42	37	1	.531		4	2	.667	
JAX	2022	9	8	0	.529	1st in AFC South	1	1	.500	Lost to Kansas City Chiefs in AFC Divisional Game
JAX	2023	9	8	0	.529	2nd in AFC South	—	—	—	—
JAX	2024	4	13	0	.235	3rd in AFC South	—	—	—	—
JAX total		22	29	0	.431		1	1	.500	
Total		64	66	1	.492		5	3	.625	

=== High school ===
Year	Team	Overall	Conference	Standing	Bowl/playoffs
Calvary Baptist Academy Cavaliers (LHSAA) (2005–2008)
2005	Calvary Baptist Academy	5–6	4–3	4th	
2006	Calvary Baptist Academy	11–2	6–1	2nd	
2007	Calvary Baptist Academy	12–1	6–0	1st	
2008	Calvary Baptist Academy	12–2	5–1	2nd	
Calvary Baptist Academy:		40–11	21–5		
Total:		40–11			

== Coaching tree ==
Three of Pederson's coaching assistants have become head coaches in the NFL, NCAA or USFL:

- John DeFilippo, New Orleans Breakers (2022–2023), Memphis Showboats (2024)
- G.J. Kinne, Incarnate Word (2022), Texas State (2023–present)
- Frank Reich, Indianapolis Colts (2018–2022), Carolina Panthers (2023), Stanford (2025)
