= Joe Paterno =

American football player and coach (1926–2012)

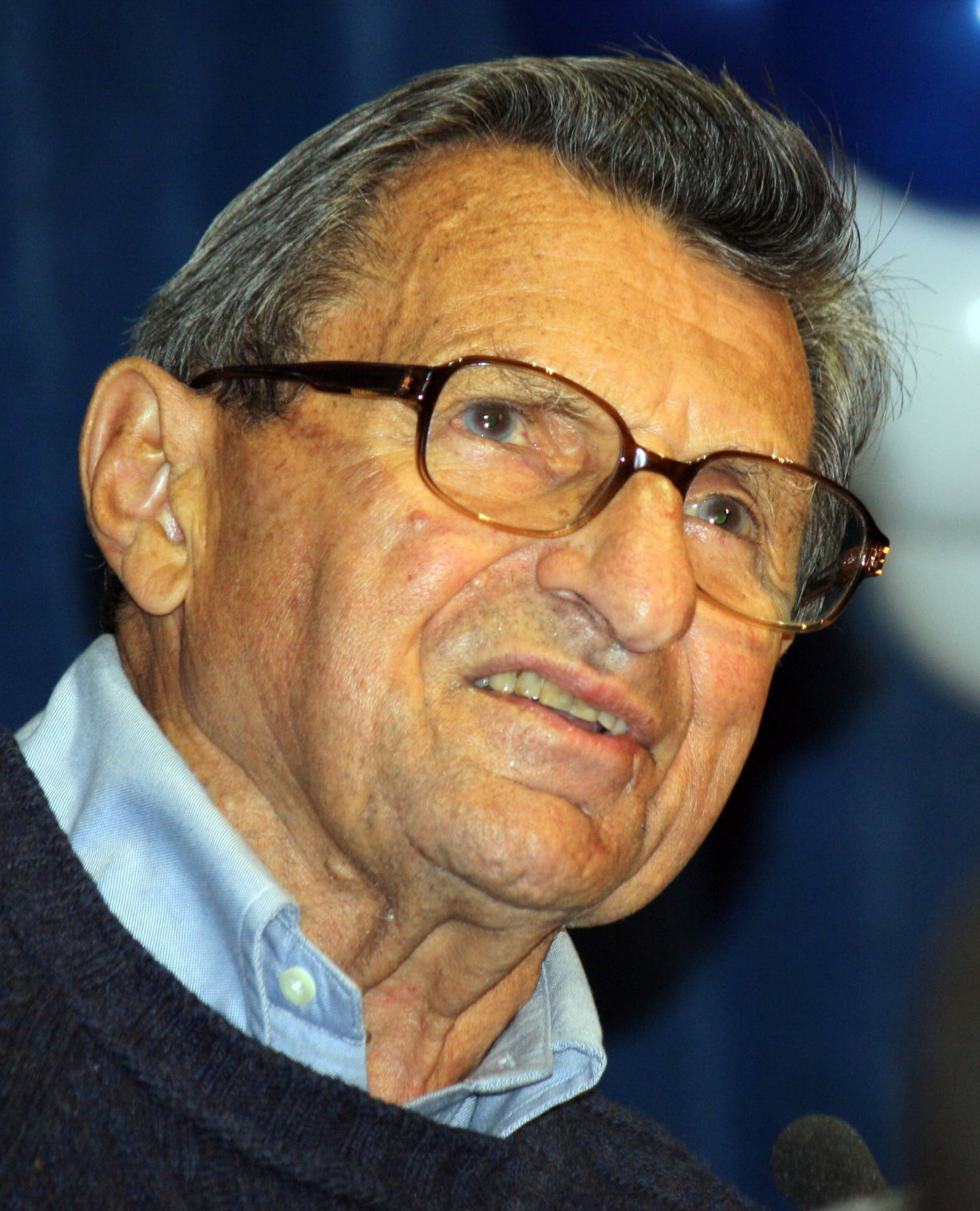
- Paterno in 2010

Biographical details
- Born: December 21, 1926; Brooklyn, New York City, U.S.
- Died: January 22, 2012 (aged 85); State College, Pennsylvania, U.S.

Playing career
- 1946–1949: Brown
- Positions: Quarterback, cornerback

Coaching career (HC unless noted)
- 1950–1965: Penn State (assistant)
- 1966–2011: Penn State

Administrative career (AD unless noted)
- 1980–1982: Penn State

Head coaching record
- Overall: 409–136–3
- Bowls: 24–12–1

Accomplishments and honors

Championships
- 2 National (1982, 1986); 3 Big Ten (1994, 2005, 2009)

Awards
- Sports Illustrated Sportsman of the Year (1986); 5× AFCA COY (1968, 1978, 1982, 1986, 2005); 3× Walter Camp COY (1972, 1994, 2005); 3× Eddie Robinson COY (1978, 1982, 1986); 2× Bobby Dodd COY (1981, 2005); Paul "Bear" Bryant Award (1986); 3× George Munger Award (1990, 1994, 2005); Amos Alonzo Stagg Award (2002); Home Depot Coach of the Year Award (2005); Sporting News College Football COY (2005); 3× Big Ten Coach of the Year (1994, 2005, 2008)
- College Football Hall of Fame; Inducted in 2007 (profile)

Joseph Vincent Paterno (/pəˈtɜːrnoʊ/; December 21, 1926 – January 22, 2012), sometimes referred to as JoePa, was an American college football player, athletic director, and coach. He was the head coach of the Penn State Nittany Lions from 1966 to 2011. With 409 victories, Paterno is the most victorious coach in NCAA FBS history. He recorded his 409th victory on October 29, 2011; his career ended with his dismissal from the team on November 9, 2011, as a result of the Penn State child sex abuse scandal. He died 74 days later, of complications from lung cancer.

Paterno was born in Brooklyn, New York. He attended Brown University, where he played football both ways as the quarterback and a cornerback. He had originally planned on going to law school, but he was instead hired in 1950 as an assistant football coach at Penn State. He was persuaded to do this by his college coach Rip Engle, who had taken over as Penn State's head coach. In 1966, Paterno was named as Engle's successor. He soon coached the team to two undefeated regular seasons in 1968 and 1969. The team won two national championships—in 1982 and 1986. Paterno coached five undefeated teams that won major bowl games, and in 2007 he was inducted into the College Football Hall of Fame as a coach. During his career, he led the Nittany Lions to 37 bowl appearances with 24 wins while turning down offers to coach National Football League (NFL) teams that included the Pittsburgh Steelers and the New England Patriots.

Paterno's coaching career ended abruptly in 2011, shortly before his death, when the Penn State Board of Trustees terminated his contract in response to a child sex abuse scandal involving Paterno's former defensive coordinator Jerry Sandusky. An investigation conducted by former FBI director Louis Freeh reported that Paterno concealed information relating to Sandusky's abuse of a young boy. A critique of the Freeh report, commissioned by the Paterno family, disputed Paterno's involvement in the alleged cover-up.

In 2012, the NCAA vacated all of Penn State's wins from 1998 through 2011 as part of its punishment. State Senator Jake Corman used the Freeh report as a basis to sue the NCAA, asserting that both Freeh and the NCAA had collaborated and failed to follow due process. Corman released emails showing "regular and substantive" contact between NCAA officials and Freeh's investigators, suggesting that Freeh's conclusions were orchestrated. In a 2015 legal settlement with Penn State, the NCAA reversed its decision and restored all 111 wins to Paterno's record.

== Early life and education ==
Paterno was born December 21, 1926, in Brooklyn, New York City, the son of Florence de LaSalle Cafiero, a homemaker, and Angelo Lafayette Paterno, a law clerk. His family was of Italian ancestry. He spoke with a marked Brooklyn accent throughout his life. In 1944, Paterno graduated from Brooklyn Preparatory School. Six weeks later, he was drafted into the United States Army during World War II. Paterno spent a year in the Army before being discharged in time to start the 1946 school year at Brown University, where his tuition was paid by Busy Arnold.

At Brown University, Paterno was a member of Delta Kappa Epsilon fraternity. He played quarterback and cornerback for the Bears, and he shares the career record for interceptions (14) with Greg Parker. Paterno graduated as an English literature major in 1950.

== Career ==
=== Penn State Nittany Lions ===
Paterno had been accepted to Boston University School of Law, and was planning to attend before changing his mind and deciding to coach at Penn State. After hearing of his career choice, his father asked, "For God's sake, what did you go to college for?" Paterno joined Rip Engle as an assistant coach at Penn State in 1950; Engle had coached five seasons, from 1944 to 1949, at Brown University.

In June 1964, Paterno was promoted to associate coach, the top assistant coaching position. In 1966, when Engle announced his retirement, Penn State University announced Paterno as his successor the following day.

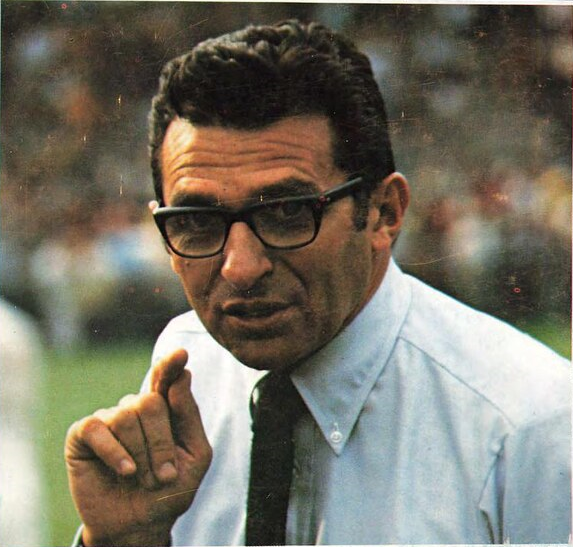
Paterno, c. 1976

Over his coaching career, Paterno had one Heisman Trophy winner, John Cappelletti, who earned the award in 1973.

Penn State football struggled from 2000 to 2004, with an overall 26–33 record in those years and Paterno became the target of criticism from some Penn State faithful. Many in the media attributed Penn State's struggles to Paterno's advancing age. He had no apparent plans to retire, and contingents of fans and alumni began calling for him to step down. Paterno rebuffed all of this and stated he would fulfill his contract until it expired in 2008. Reflecting the growth in Penn State's stature, Beaver Stadium was expanded six times during his tenure, increasing in size from 46,284 in 1966 to 106,572 in 2001.

During a speech in Pittsburgh on May 12, 2005, Paterno announced that he would consider retirement if the 2005 football team had a disappointing season. "If we don't win some games, I've got to get my rear end out of here", Paterno said in a speech at the Duquesne Club. "Simple as that". Penn State finished the season with a record of 11–1 and were champions of the Big Ten in 2005. They defeated Florida State 26–23 in triple overtime in the 2006 Orange Bowl.

The 2009 season was Paterno's 44th as head coach of the Nittany Lions, passing Amos Alonzo Stagg for the most years as head coach at a single institution in Division I.

Paterno's abbreviated 2011 season was his 62nd on the Penn State coaching staff, which gave him the record for most seasons for any football coach at a single university.

From 2002 onward, Penn State faced a litany of players' off-the-field legal problems, which included 46 Penn State football players facing 163 criminal charges, of which 118 charges were dismissed or not proven, according to an ESPN analysis of Pennsylvania court records and reports.

The Pennsylvania State Employees' Retirement System (SERS) revealed Paterno's salary in November 2007 as $512,664. He was paid $490,638 in 2006. "I'm paid well, I'm not overpaid," Paterno said during an interview with reporters Wednesday before the salary disclosure. "I got all the money I need".

Paterno was known for his gameday image — thick glasses, rolled-up dress slacks (by his admission, to save on cleaning bills), white socks and Brooklyn-tinged speech.

==== Bowls and championships ====
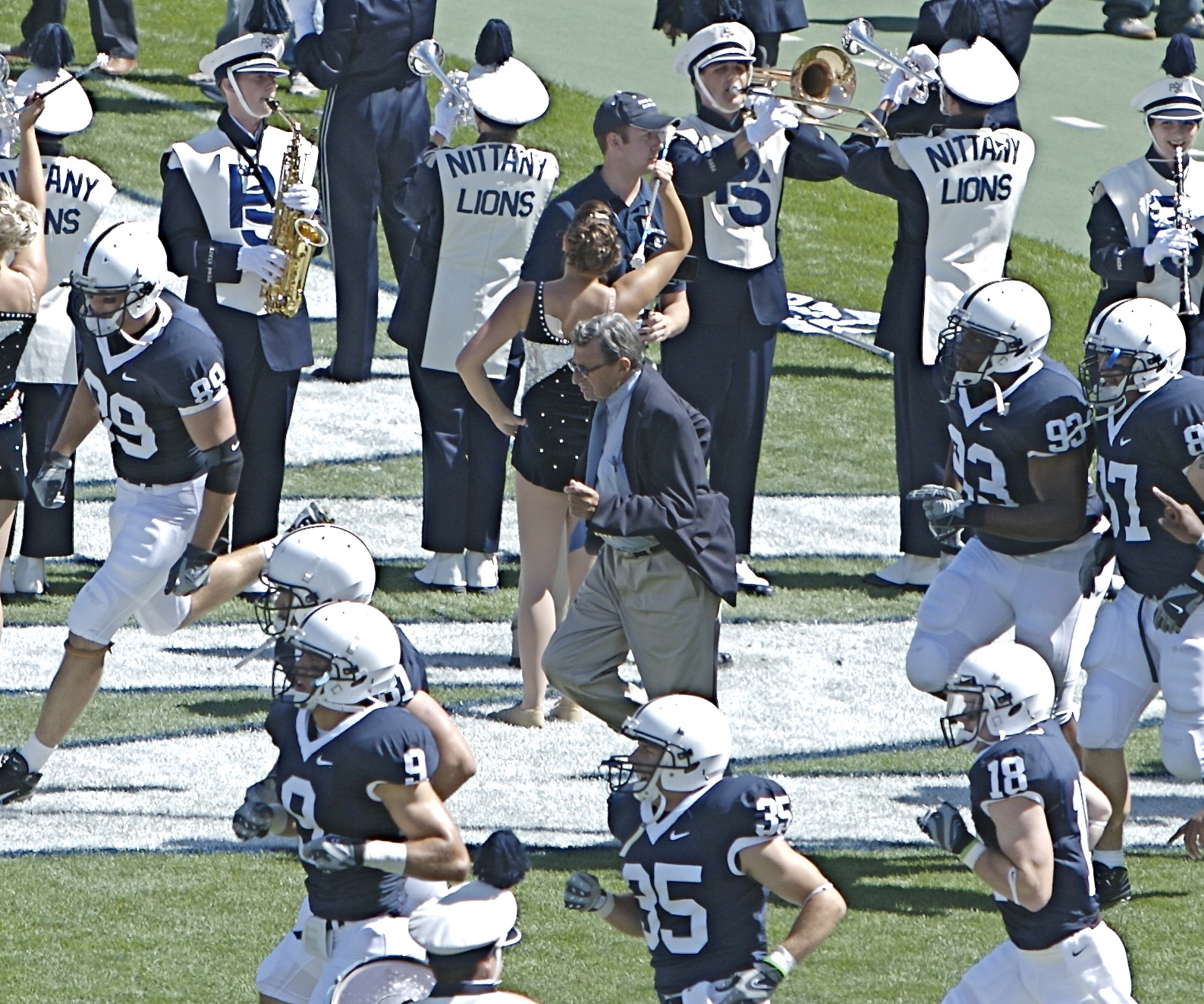
Paterno jogs out with his team before the start of a game in September 2007

Paterno holds an official NCAA total of 18 bowl victories. He holds the NCAA record for total bowl appearances with 37. He had a bowl record of 24 wins, 12 losses, and 1 tie following a defeat in the 2011 Outback Bowl. Paterno was the first coach with the distinction of having won each of the four major bowls — Rose, Orange, Fiesta, and Sugar — as well as the Cotton Bowl Classic, at least once. Penn State won at least three bowl games in each of the four decades in which Paterno coached the entire decade, from 1970 thru 2009.

Paterno led Penn State to two national championships (1982 and 1986) and five undefeated, untied seasons (1968, 1969, 1973, 1986, and 1994). Four of his unbeaten teams (1968, 1969, 1973, and 1994) won major bowl games and were not awarded a national championship.

Under Paterno, Penn State won the Orange Bowl (1968, 1969, 1973 and 2005), the Cotton Bowl Classic (1972 and 1974), the Fiesta Bowl (1977, 1980, 1981, 1986, 1991, and 1996), the Liberty Bowl (1979), the Sugar Bowl (1982), the Aloha Bowl (1983), the Holiday Bowl (1989), the Citrus Bowl (1993 and 2010), the Rose Bowl Game (1994), the Outback Bowl (1995, 1998 and 2006), and the Alamo Bowl (1999 and 2007).

After Penn State joined the Big Ten Conference in 1993, the Nittany Lions under Paterno won the Big Ten championship three times (1994, 2005 and 2008). Paterno had 29 finishes in the Top 10 national rankings.

==== Awards and honors ====
- Amos Alonzo Stagg Award, 1989, 2001, and 2002
- AFCA Coach of the Year Award, 1968, 1978, 1982, 1986, and 2005
- Associated Press College Football Coach of the Year Award, 2005
- Dave McClain Big Ten Conference Coach of the Year, 1994, 2005, and 2008
- Bobby Dodd Coach of the Year Award, 1981 and 2005
- Eddie Robinson Coach of the Year Award, 1978, 1982, and 1986
- George Munger Award (NCAA Division I Coach of the Year), 1990, 1994, and 2005 (subsequently revoked)
- Home Depot Coach of the Year, 2005
- National Football Foundation Distinguished American Award, 1992
- National Football Foundation Gold Medal Award, 2006
- NCAA Gerald R. Ford Award, 2011 (subsequently revoked)
- Paul "Bear" Bryant Award, 1986
- Sports Illustrated "Sportsperson of the Year, 1986
- Sporting News College Football Coach of the Year, 2005
- Walter Camp Coach of the Year Award, 1972, 1994, 2005

On May 16, 2006, Paterno was elected to the College Football Hall of Fame after the National Football Foundation decided to change its rules and allow any coach over the age of 75 to be eligible for the Hall of Fame instead of having to wait until retirement. However, on November 4, 2006, he was injured during a sideline collision during a game against Wisconsin. As a result of his injuries, he was unable to travel to the induction ceremonies in New York City, and the National Football Foundation announced that he would instead be inducted as a part of the Hall of Fame class of 2007. Paterno was inducted on December 4, 2007, and officially enshrined in a ceremony held July 19, 2008.

In 2009, Paterno was named to Sporting News' list of 50 greatest coaches of all time, including coaches from Major League Baseball, National Basketball Association, National Football League, National Hockey League, college basketball, and college football, ranked 13th overall.

In 2010, the Maxwell Football Club of Philadelphia established the Joseph V. Paterno Award, to be awarded annually to the college football coach "who has made a positive impact on his university, his players and his community." Following the breaking of the Penn State child sex abuse scandal the following year, the award was discontinued by the club.

Also in 2010, the Big Ten Conference established the Stagg – Paterno Championship Trophy as the annual trophy to be awarded to the winner of the conference football championship. However, on November 14, 2011, the trophy name was changed to the Stagg Championship Trophy in light of the Sandusky child abuse scandal.

Paterno was also nominated for the Presidential Medal of Freedom. However, in light of the Sandusky child abuse scandal, U.S. Senators Pat Toomey and Bob Casey Jr., and Representative Glenn Thompson withdrew their support of Paterno receiving the honor.

== Child sex abuse scandal and dismissal ==
My name, I have spent my whole life trying to make that name mean something. And now it's gone.
—Joe Paterno, following his termination

I do not [believe Joe Paterno was involved in the alleged cover-up]. And I'm viewing this strictly on the evidence, not any kind of fealty to anybody. I did not find that evidence.
—Sandusky prosecutor Frank Fina, on 60 Minutes

On November 5, 2011, former Penn State defensive coordinator Jerry Sandusky was arrested on 52 counts of child sexual abuse occurring between 1994 and 2009, including allegations of incidents on the Penn State campus. A 2011 grand jury investigation reported that then-graduate assistant Mike McQueary told Paterno in 2002 (prosecutors later amended the date to 2001) that he had seen Sandusky abusing a 10-year-old boy in Penn State football's shower facilities. According to the report, Paterno notified Athletic Director Tim Curley about the incident and later notified Gary Schultz, vice president of finance and business, to whom the University Police directly reported. Paterno said McQueary informed him that "he had witnessed an incident in the shower... but he at no time related to me the very specific actions contained in the grand jury report." In his grand jury testimony, Paterno stated that McQueary had described Sandusky "fondling" a young boy in an act he described as of a "sexual nature," but stopped short of the rape to which McQueary would later testify. Despite the nature of the 2001 incident and that it later became clear that Curley and other university officials had not reported the allegations to police, Paterno did not then notify police either. Instead, two weeks later, Curley reported that Sandusky's keys to the locker room had been taken away and that the incident was reported to The Second Mile charity. Sandusky was also banned from bringing children onto the Penn State campus. While the prosecutors did not accuse Paterno of any wrongdoing, he was questioned over his apparent failure to follow up on his report to his boss about McQueary's statements. Pennsylvania Attorney General Linda Kelly said that Paterno was cooperative with prosecutors and that he met his statutory responsibility to report the 2001 incident to school administrators.

Under Pennsylvania state law at the time, any state employee who learned about suspected child abuse was required to report the incident to their immediate supervisor. In the case of the 2001 incident, McQueary reported the incident to his immediate supervisor, Paterno. In turn, Paterno reported the incident to his immediate supervisor, Curley, who then reported it to Gary Schultz, former senior vice president for business and finance, a position to which the University Police Department directly reported. (Schultz failed to notify his subordinate, the director of university police.) For these reasons, Paterno did not come under criminal suspicion. Pennsylvania State Police Commissioner Frank Noonan, however, criticized Paterno for not doing enough to stop Sandusky's crimes. Noonan stated that while Paterno may have done what he was legally required to do, anyone with knowledge of possible sexual abuse against minors had "moral requirements" to notify police.

On the night of November 8, hundreds of students gathered in front of Paterno's home in support of Paterno. Paterno thanked the crowd and said, "The kids who were victims or whatever they want to say, I think we all ought to say a prayer for them. It's a tough life when people do certain things to you." As Paterno began walking back into his home with the crowd chanting "Let Joe Stay," he turned around to instead lead the crowd in "We are Penn State" cheers, which unnamed members of the Penn State Board of Trustees viewed as insensitive. Within days of the scandal breaking in full, speculation was rife that Paterno would not be allowed to return as head coach. On November 9, Paterno announced that he would retire at the end of the season, stating:

. . . I have decided to announce my retirement effective at the end of this season. At this moment the Board of Trustees should not spend a single minute discussing my status. They have far more important matters to address. I want to make this as easy for them as I possibly can.

Later that evening, however, the board of trustees voted to terminate Paterno's contract, effective immediately. They considered but ultimately rejected the idea of letting Paterno finish out the season, saying that growing outrage at the situation would have made it impossible for him to be effective as coach. Unable to reach Paterno personally due to the crowd around his house and not wanting Paterno to find out through the media, the board notified him of their decision over the telephone. Tom Bradley, Sandusky's successor as defensive coordinator, was named interim head coach for the remainder of the 2011 season. At the same meeting, university president Graham Spanier resigned rather than face being fired as well. That night, several thousand Penn State students chanting Paterno's name rioted in the streets, hurling rocks, tearing down street signs, and overturning a news van.

Paterno supporters and family members continued to harshly criticize the board's actions in the months following his death, prompting the board in March 2012 to release an additional statement explaining their decision. In it, the board said that it opted to remove Paterno after finding that "his decision to do his minimum legal duty and not to do more to follow up constituted a failure of leadership." The board had earlier said there were three key reasons for his firing: his failure to do more when told about a suspected sexual assault by Jerry Sandusky; what the board of trustees regarded as his questioning of the board's authority in the days after Sandusky's arrest; and what the board determined to be his inability to effectively continue coaching in the face of continuing questions surrounding the program. However, in late 2014 and early 2015, court depositions by trustees Kenneth Frazier and Keith Masser conflicted with the "failure of leadership" story. Masser stated, "The decision to remove Coach Paterno had nothing to do with what he had known, what he hadn't done. It was based upon the distraction of having him on the sidelines would have caused the university and the current football team harm. It had nothing to do with what Coach Paterno had done, or hadn't done."

=== Posthumous findings ===
Former FBI director Louis Freeh and his firm, including a team of former federal prosecutors and FBI agents, were hired by the Penn State Board of Trustees to conduct an independent investigation into the scandal. In the opinion of writer Michael Sokolove, the mission Freeh was given seemed to speculate that Sandusky's crimes were not his alone and that people who had reason to suspect him had looked away. After interviewing over 400 people and reviewing voluminous documents, the investigation team reported that Paterno, Spanier, Curley, and Schultz (none of whom were interviewed) concealed Sandusky's actions in order to protect the publicity surrounding Penn State's celebrated football program. Freeh's firm's investigation concluded that by their actions, the four men "failed to protect against a child sexual predator harming children for over a decade." The report asserted that Paterno, Schultz, Spanier, and Curley "concealed Sandusky's activities from the Board of Trustees, the University community and authorities."

Freeh's investigators discovered an email between Curley and Schultz regarding a previous incident between Sandusky and another child in 1998 that the district attorney declined to prosecute after an investigation by State College police and an evaluation by the Department of Public Welfare. On May 13, 1998, in an email with the subject "Jerry," Curley asked Schultz, "Anything new in this department? Coach is anxious to know where it stands." Curley testified more than nineteen years later in the 2017 criminal trial against Spanier that the "coach" who wanted to know where it stands was Paterno. Before a grand jury in 2011, when Paterno was asked, other than the 2001 incident that Mike McQueary reported to him, whether he knew of any other inappropriate sexual conduct by Sandusky with young boys, Paterno testified, "I do not know of anything else that Jerry would be involved in of that nature, no. I do not know of it. You did mention — I think you said something about a rumor. It may have been discussed in my presence, something else about somebody. I don't know. I don't remember, and I could not honestly say I heard a rumor."

Freeh's team also discovered a 2001 email from Curley about the subsequent 2001 incident in which McQueary witnessed Sandusky with a boy in the Penn State showers. On February 25, Curley, Schultz, and Spanier decided to have Curley report McQueary's information to the state Department of Public Welfare. On February 26, Curley had a conversation with Paterno. (Curley testified in 2017, "I don't recall the specific conversation or what his [Paterno's] reaction was.") On February 27, Curley emailed Spanier and Schultz that he was "having trouble with going to everyone, but the person involved". (In 2017 he testified that was his opinion. "I wanted the first step to be a meeting with Jerry Sandusky.") Curley, Schultz and Spanier then agreed to report the incident to both the Department of Public Welfare and the Second Mile if Sandusky did not cooperate and get professional help (i.e., rather than not reporting the incident to authorities outside the university, reporting to the Department of Public Welfare was still part of the plan). In his press release, Freeh wrote to the contrary that "the only known, intervening factor between the decision made on February 25, 2001 by Messrs. Spanier, Curley and Schulz to report the incident to the Department of Public Welfare, and then [as alleged by Freeh] agreeing not to do so on February 27th, was Mr. Paterno's February 26th conversation with Mr. Curley." Freeh's mischaracterization of the February 27 email was widely inferred by the press to mean that Paterno had persuaded Curley (and Schultz and Spanier) not to report the incident to authorities outside the university.

In addition, the Freeh report said that even after Sandusky's retirement in 1999, Paterno, Schultz, Spanier, and Curley "empowered Sandusky to attract potential victims to the campus and football events by allowing him to have continued, unrestricted and unsupervised access to the University's facilities and affiliation with the University's prominent football program." Sandusky's access was part of the retirement agreement between the university and Sandusky: "The university will permit you to use, at no charge, a locker, weight rooms, fitness facilities and training room in the East Area locker room complex. This benefit will continue for the balance of your lifetime," and "For a period of ten years commencing July 1, 1999 and subject to renewal upon concurrence of both parties you will be given an office and a phone in the East Area Locker room complex ..." The agreement was signed by Curley and Schultz along with Sandusky on June 29, 1999.

Following the release of the Freeh report, Nike, Inc. removed Paterno's name from the Joe Paterno Child Development Center, a child care facility at the company's headquarters in Beaverton, Oregon. Brown University, Paterno's alma mater, announced that it would remove Paterno's name from its annual award honoring outstanding male freshman athletes and stated his status in the Brown Athletic Hall of Fame would be placed under review.

Joe Paterno statue before it was removed from the front of Penn State's Beaver Stadium. The statue was removed on July 22, 2012, six months after Paterno's death, and placed in secure storage inside the stadium.

On July 14, 2012, The New York Times reported that in January 2011, Paterno opened "surprise" negotiations to prematurely end his contract with an additional $3 million early retirement payout, prior to public knowledge of the scandal. Although his contract was not up for negotiation until the end of 2011, Paterno initiated negotiations with his superiors to amend his contract in January 2011, the same month he was notified of the police investigation. By August 2011, Paterno and his attorneys had reached a deal with the PSU Board for a total package worth $5.5 million, including a $3 million cash payout, forgiveness of a $350,000 interest-free loan issued by the university, and the use of a private box at Beaver Stadium and a private jet for 25 years, if he agreed the 2011 season would be his last. Ultimately, the board rejected Paterno's offer to resign at the end of the 2011 season. But following Paterno's firing, faced with hate mail and a threat of a defamation lawsuit by Paterno's family, the board agreed to give Paterno and his family the $5.5 million package, which included additional perks for the family. A lawyer for the family said that Penn State proposed the retirement package.

After the Freeh report's release, critics called for the removal of the Joe Paterno statue outside Beaver Stadium. A small plane towed a banner over campus, reading Take the Statue Down or We Will. After some days of mixed messages, the school removed the statue on Sunday, July 22, in front of a crowd of student onlookers. The statue was reportedly put in storage. Spanier's successor as president, Rodney Erickson, said the statue had become "a source of division and an obstacle to healing" but made a distinction between it and the Paterno Library, also on campus.

On July 23, two weeks after the release of the Freeh report, the NCAA punished Penn State with some of the most severe sanctions ever handed down in the history of collegiate athletics. Penn State was fined $60 million, stripped of 40 total scholarships from 2013 to 2017, banned from postseason play until 2016, and vacated all 112 of its wins dating back to 1998. This included the removal of Paterno's last 111 wins at Penn State, dropping him from first to 12th on the all-time wins list. (In early 2015 the wins were restored.) The NCAA reported that "Penn State's leadership failed to value and uphold institutional integrity, breaching both the NCAA Constitution and Division I rules", and that the NCAA "intended to remediate the 'sports is king' culture that led to failures in leadership". The NCAA report harshly criticized Paterno for his role in an alleged cover-up of Sandusky's crimes, saying that Paterno, Spanier, Schultz, and Curley had demonstrated "a failure of institutional and individual integrity". Although this action was outside the normal process for investigating major violations, the NCAA said this action was merited because the alleged cover-up violated basic principles of intercollegiate athletics that were over and above specific policies.

In a September 2013 interview with the CBS show 60 Minutes, Sandusky prosecutor Frank Fina was asked if he believed Joe Paterno was involved in the alleged cover-up. Fina stated, "I do not. And I'm viewing this strictly on the evidence, not any kind of fealty to anybody. I did not find that evidence."

=== Response to the Freeh Report ===
On September 13, 2012, a group of alumni and supporters called Penn Staters for Responsible Stewardship released a review of the Freeh Report that was critical of the Freeh Group's investigation and conclusions. In February 2013, Paterno's family released a report written by Dick Thornburgh, a former U.S. attorney general and Pennsylvania governor, disputing Freeh's investigative methods and the portrayal of Paterno in his findings, calling the Freeh report a "rush to injustice". Thornburgh concluded that the Freeh report was "seriously flawed, both with respect to the process of [its] investigation and its findings related to Mr. Paterno". In response, Freeh called the Paterno family's report "self-serving" and said that it did not change the facts and findings of his initial investigation.

NBC sportscaster Bob Costas said, "What Freeh did was not only gather facts but he reached a conclusion which is at least debatable from those facts and then he assigned a motivation, not only to Curley and Schultz and Spanier, but he specifically assigned a very dark motivation to Joe Paterno, which seems like it might be quite a leap. ... A reasonable person will conclude that there is some doubt here and that the other side of the story deserves to be heard." Similarly Todd Blackledge, ESPN college football analyst and former Penn State quarterback, noted on the media coverage, "it felt like the media felt at liberty to just connect [] all those dots, whether they had facts. Based on whatever information they had, they were going to connect the dots and tell a story. And it had tremendous momentum. Because of the serious and horrendous nature of the allegations against Jerry, that narrative went pretty much unopposed."

In 2014 NCAA internal emails revealed that the NCAA worked closely with Louis Freeh in his investigation of the Sandusky scandal. In addition, emails revealed that many in the NCAA questioned whether they had the authority to sanction Penn State and that some officials wanted to "bluff" Penn State's leadership into accepting a severe punishment, because they believed that they did not have the authority to punish Penn State. On the day the Freeh Report was released, Oregon State president Ed Ray, chairman of the NCAA's executive committee, sent an e-mail to NCAA president Mark Emmert, his deputy, and the former enforcement head of the NCAA that directed them to come up with a way to sanction Penn State.

Freeh had maintained publicly that his investigation was entirely independent and would include "no favoritism". This was criticized by Pennsylvania state Senator Jake Corman, who claimed, "There clearly is a significant amount of communication between Freeh and the NCAA that goes way beyond merely providing information. I'd call it coordination ... Clearly, Freeh went way past his mandate. He was the enforcement person for the NCAA. That's what it looks like. I don't know how you can look at it any other way. It's almost like the NCAA hired him to do their enforcement investigation on Penn State. At a minimum, it is inappropriate. At a maximum, these were two parties working together to get an outcome that was predetermined." NCAA Vice President of Academic and Membership Affairs Kevin Lennon wrote in another email from July 14 that the NCAA was "banking on the fact the school is so embarrassed they will do anything" before interim Penn State president Rodney Erickson signed the consent decree.

In January 2013, Senator Corman and state treasurer Rob McCord used the Freeh report as a basis to sue the NCAA, arguing that the $60 million fine should be kept to assist victims of child sexual abuse in Pennsylvania, instead of allowing it to be spread to programs beyond the state's boundaries.

On May 30, 2013, the Paterno family and members of the Penn State community (though not the university itself) filed a lawsuit in the Centre County Court of Common Pleas in an attempt to overturn sanctions against the school. The lawsuit asserted that the NCAA and the other defendants breached their contractual obligations, violated their duties of good faith and fair dealing, intentionally interfered with contractual relations, and defamed and/or commercially disparaged the individuals filing the lawsuit.

On January 16, 2015, the NCAA agreed to a settlement, removing the probationary period imposed on Penn State and restoring Paterno's 111 wins between 1998 and 2011. Corman proclaimed, "Today is a victory for due process which was not afforded in this case. Today is a victory for the people of Pennsylvania. Today is a victory for Penn State nation."

A year after the report was issued, the chairman of the Penn State Board of Trustees, which had originally commissioned the report, said that Freeh's conclusions amounted to "speculation." In a January 2015 interview with the Associated Press, Penn State President Eric Barron said, "I have to say, I'm not a fan of the report. There's no doubt in my mind, Freeh steered everything as if he were a prosecutor trying to convince a court to take the case."

On July 12, 2016, The New York Times reported that, in a document created in 2014, an anonymous man alleged that Sandusky had touched him inappropriately in 1976 and that he had told Paterno the next day.

== Views on college football issues ==
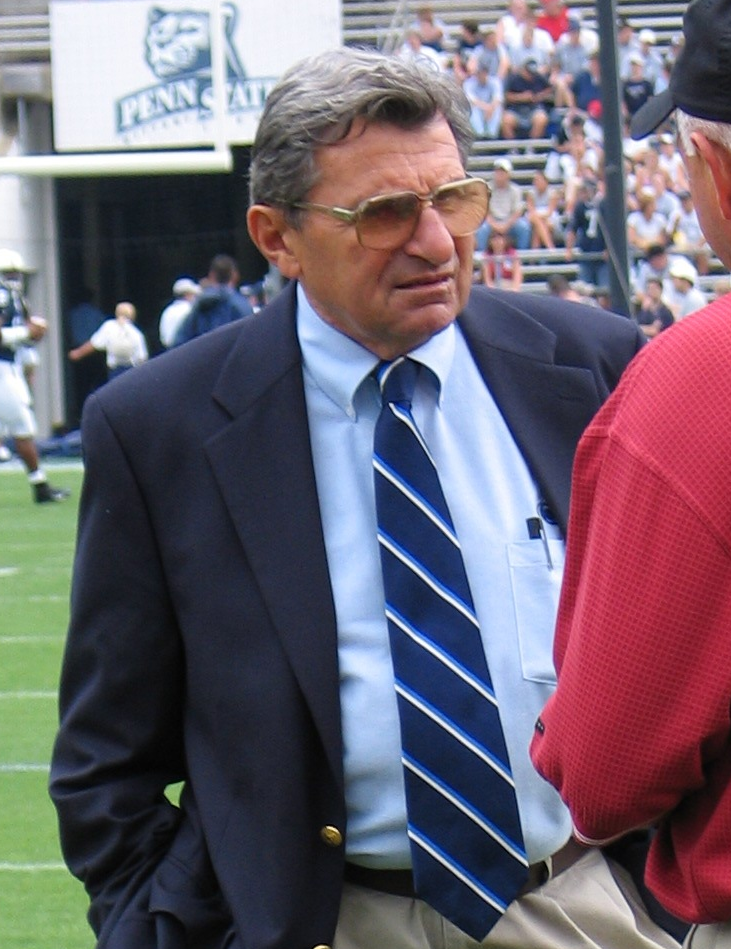
Paterno in 2003

Paterno was a long-time advocate for some type of college football playoff system. The question was posed to him frequently over the years, as only one of his five undefeated teams was voted national champion. The college football playoff system would become a reality three years after Paterno's exit from the game.

Paterno believed that scholarship college athletes should receive a modest stipend so that they have some spending money. As justification, Paterno pointed out that many scholarship athletes came from poor families and that other students had time to hold down a part-time job, whereas busy practice and conditioning schedules prevented college athletes from working during the school year.

Paterno initially preferred not to play true freshmen, but later in his career he did play redshirts in order to refrain from being at a competitive disadvantage. Some Penn State recruits, like recruits at many other schools, now graduate from high school a semester early so that they can enroll in college during the spring semester and participate in spring practice. Several team members from the recruiting class of 2005, including Justin King, Anthony Scirrotto, and Derrick Williams, received considerable playing time as true freshmen during the 2005–2006 season.

In 2010, Paterno and former Chicago Bears head coach Mike Ditka suggested that concussions and other injuries in the NFL and college football might be reduced if face masks were eliminated.

Penn State's football players were twice recognized for outstanding academic performance by the New America Foundation's Academic Bowl Championship Series while under the leadership of Paterno. The team was ranked number one out of the top 25 ranked BCS teams in 2009 and 2011. The criteria in the rankings include the graduation rate of the team as compared to the rest of university, the difference between the graduation rate of African-American players and the rest of the squad as well as the same statistics for the rest of the students at Penn State, and the graduation rate differences between the African American players and students.

=== Officiating and instant replay ===
In 2002, 76-year-old Paterno chased down referee Dick Honig in a dead sprint following a 42–35 overtime home loss to Iowa. Paterno saw Tony Johnson catch a pass for a first down with both feet in bounds on the stadium's video replay board, but the play was ruled an incompletion. This being after Penn State had rallied from a 35–13 deficit with 9 minutes left in the game to tie the score at 35, and were driving on their first possession in overtime (a touchdown would have tied the game at 42). Penn State failed on fourth down and Iowa held on for the win.

Just weeks later, in the final minute of the Michigan game, the same wide receiver, Johnson, made a catch that would have given Penn State a first down and put them in range for a game-winning field goal. Although Johnson was ruled out of bounds, replays clearly showed that Johnson had both feet in bounds and the catch should have been ruled complete.

In 2004, the Big Ten Conference became the first college football conference to adopt a form of instant replay. The previous two incidents, along with Paterno's public objections, and the Big Ten's Clockgate controversy, are often cited as catalysts for its adoption. Within the next year, almost all of the Division I-A conferences adopted a form of instant replay based on the Big Ten model.

== Outside of football ==
=== Philanthropy and education ===
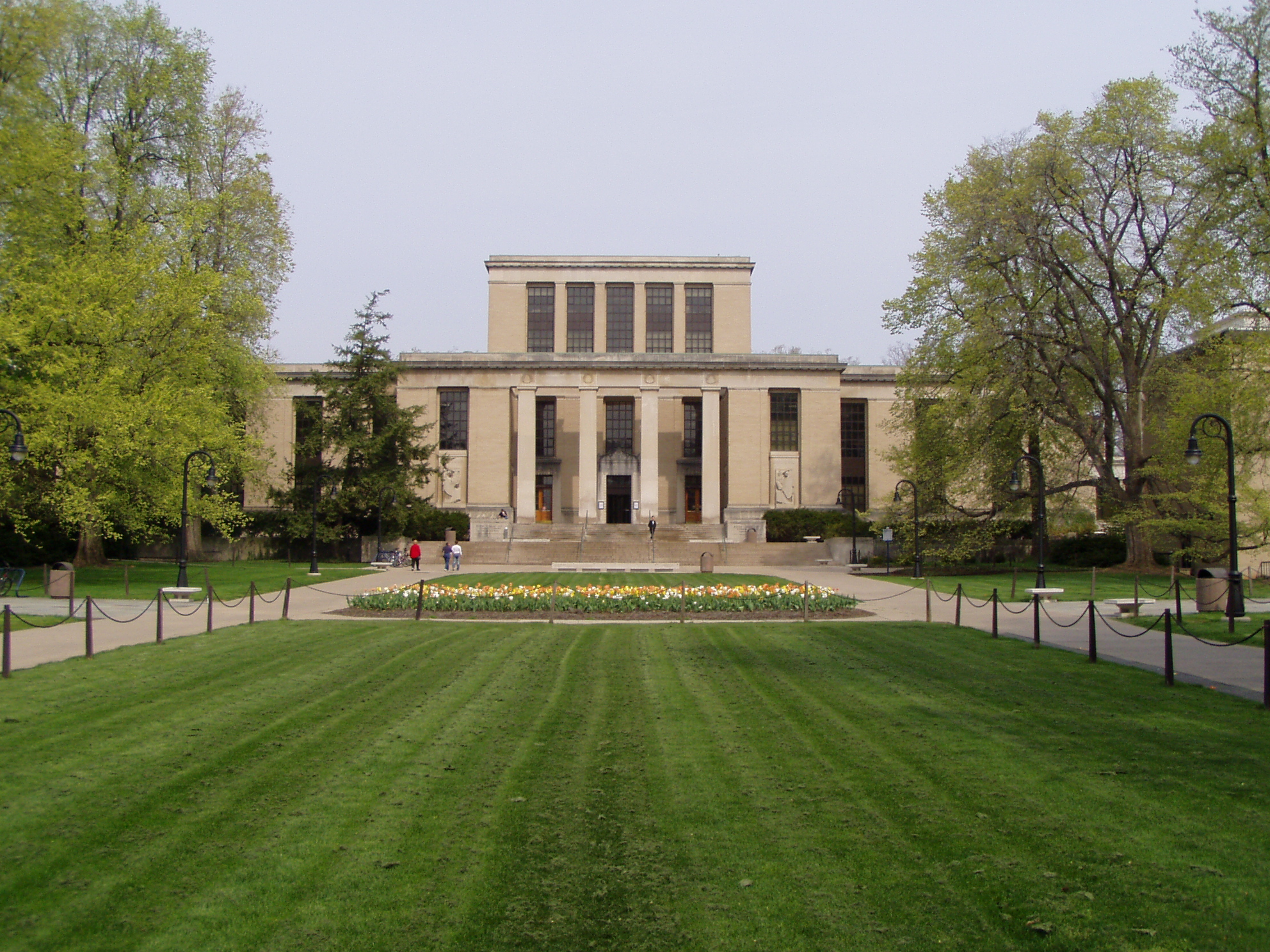
The East wing of the Pattee Library (center) is connected to the Paterno Library (to right, not seen) at Penn State University.

After the announcement of his appointment as head coach in 1966, Paterno set out to conduct what he called a "Grand Experiment" in melding athletics and academics in the collegiate environment, an idea that he had learned during his years at Brown. As a result, Penn State's players have consistently demonstrated above-average academic success compared to Division I-A schools nationwide. According to the NCAA's 2008 Graduation Rates Report, Penn State's four-year Graduation Success Rate of 78% easily exceeds the 67% Division I average, second to only Northwestern among Big Ten institutions. In 2011, Penn State football players had an 80% graduation rate and showed no achievement gap between its black and white players, which is extremely rare for Division I football teams. The New American Foundation ranked Penn State No. 1 in its 2011 Academic Bowl Championship Series.

Paterno was also renowned for his charitable contributions to academics at Penn State. He and his wife Sue have contributed over $4 million towards various departments and colleges, including support for the Penn State All-Sports Museum, which opened in 2002, and the Pasquerilla Spiritual Center, which opened in 2003. After helping raise over $13.5 million in funds for the 1997 expansion of Pattee Library, the university named the expansion Paterno Library in their honor.

In 2007, former player Franco Harris and his company R Super Foods honored Paterno for his contributions to Penn State by featuring his story and picture on boxes of Super Donuts and Super Buns in Central PA. A portion of the sales will be donated to an endowment fund for the university library that bears his name.

Paterno also attended the annual Penn State Dance Marathon, a popular weekend-long charity event and the largest student-run philanthropy in the world (it raised over $10 million in 2012), every year to raise money for kids with cancer.

=== Political interests ===
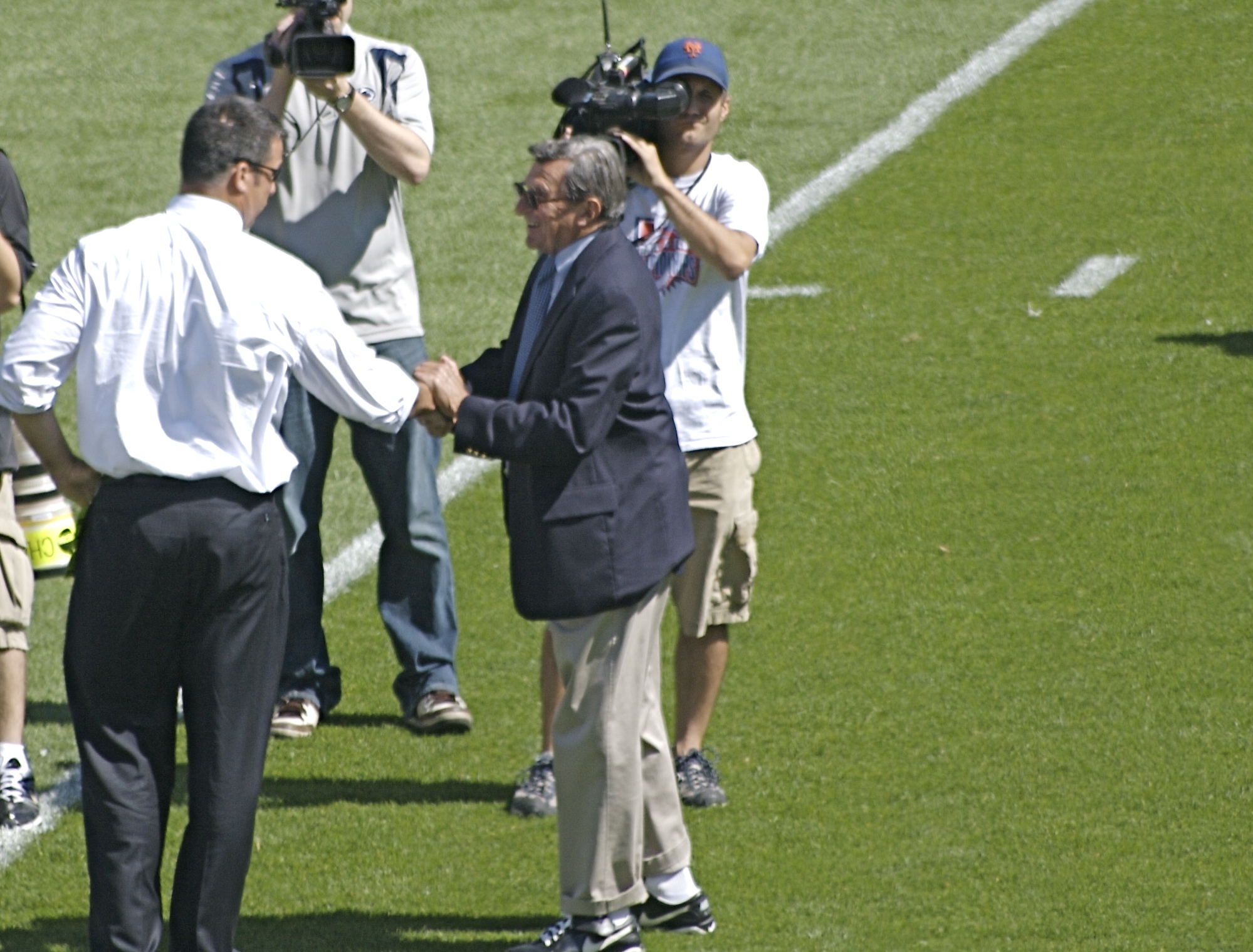
Paterno shakes hands with FIU Coach Mario Cristobal in September 2007.

Paterno was a political conservative and a personal friend of President George H. W. Bush. He campaigned for Bush door-to-door in the 1988 New Hampshire primary, and seconded his nomination at the Republican National Convention. Paterno was also a close friend of President Gerald R. Ford, and introduced President George W. Bush at a campaign rally before the 2004 presidential election. Before the 1974 Pennsylvania gubernatorial election, a group of Pennsylvania Republican Party leaders briefly considered Paterno for Andrew Lewis' ticket as the candidate for lieutenant governor.

In 2004, his son Scott Paterno, an attorney, won the Republican primary for Pennsylvania's 17th congressional district but lost in the November general election to Democratic incumbent Tim Holden. "I brought my kids up to think for themselves since day one," Joe Paterno said in 2008. "I got a son who's a Republican, who ran for Congress, Scott. I'm a Republican. I've got a son, Jay, who's for Obama. I've got a daughter, who I'm pretty sure she's going to be for Hillary [Clinton]. So God bless America."

=== Personal life ===
While serving as an assistant coach, Paterno met freshman coed Suzanne Pohland at the campus library; she was a Latrobe native 13 years his junior and an English literature honors student. They married in 1962, the year she graduated. They had five children: Diana, Joseph Jr. "Jay", Mary Kay, David, and Scott. All of their children are Penn State graduates, and Jay Paterno was the quarterbacks coach at Penn State until his departure following the hiring of new head coach Bill O'Brien on January 7, 2012. The Paternos had 17 grandchildren.

Paterno was a longtime summer resident of Avalon, New Jersey.

Paterno and Suzanne co-authored the children's book We Are Penn State!, which takes place during a typical Penn State homecoming weekend.

== Deteriorating health and death ==
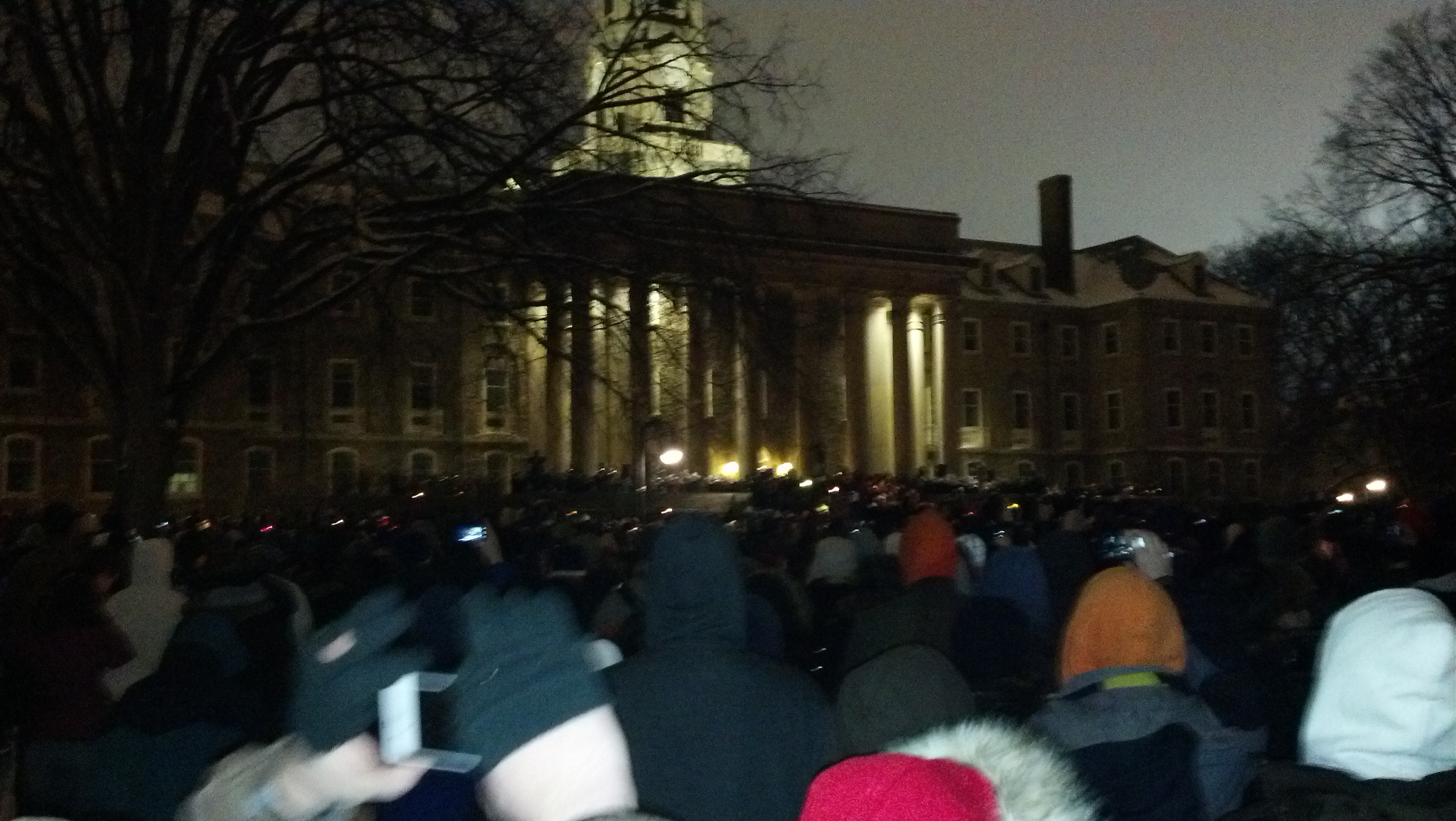
Thousands of Penn State students and faculty attend a candlelight vigil for Paterno at Old Main on his day of death, January 22, 2012.

In November 2006, Paterno was involved in a sideline collision during a game against Wisconsin. He was unable to avoid the play and was struck in the knee by Badgers linebacker DeAndre Levy's helmet. Paterno, then 79 years old, suffered a fractured shin bone and damage to knee ligaments. He coached the 2007 Outback Bowl from the press box before making a full recovery.

In November 2008, Paterno had successful hip replacement surgery after spraining his leg while trying to demonstrate onside kicks during a practice session. While recovering, he coached the remainder of the season and the 2009 Rose Bowl from the press box. After sustaining these injuries, he made use of a golf cart to move around the field during practices.

Paterno was injured again in August 2011, after colliding with a player during practice. He sustained hairline fractures to his hip and shoulder. No surgery was required, but Paterno began the 2011 regular season schedule in a wheelchair.

On November 18, 2011, just nine days after his dismissal from Penn State, Paterno's son Scott reported that his father had a treatable form of lung cancer. On January 13, 2012, Paterno was hospitalized in State College for complications relating to his cancer treatment, and he remained there until his death nine days later on January 22, 2012; his death came 74 days after his dismissal from Penn State. His death resulted in tributes from prominent leaders in the U.S., including former President George H. W. Bush, who called Paterno "an outstanding American who was respected not only on the field of play but in life generally—and he was, without a doubt, a true icon in the world of sports." Pennsylvania Governor Tom Corbett said of Paterno, "His legacy as the winningest coach in major college football and his generosity to Penn State as an institution and to his players, stand as monuments to his life. ... His place in our state's history is secure." On January 23, Corbett ordered all state flags to be lowered to half staff in Paterno's honor. At the time of his death, Penn State was still finalizing Paterno's retirement package.

Paterno's funeral was held in State College on January 25, 2012. About 750 mourners attended the private ceremony, after which thousands of mourners lined the route of the funeral procession. Paterno was buried in Spring Creek Presbyterian Cemetery just outside the town. Approximately 12,000 people attended a public memorial service that was held at the Bryce Jordan Center on January 26, 2012.

== Head coaching record ==
At the time of his death, Paterno had accumulated a record of 409 wins, 136 losses, and 3 ties. However, on July 23, 2012, the NCAA officially vacated 111 of Paterno's wins based on the findings of the Freeh report regarding his involvement in the Penn State sex abuse scandal. All wins dating back to 1998 were vacated, the year Paterno was first informed of Sandusky's suspected child abuse. Based on the criteria used by the NCAA, Paterno no longer held the record for most victories by an NCAA Division I football coach. Former Florida State coach Bobby Bowden held the NCAA major college record for wins at 377, while for NCAA Division I schools, Grambling State University coach Eddie Robinson's 408 victories stood as the official record. The 111 wins were restored on January 16, 2015, as a part of a settlement between the NCAA and Penn State, once again making him the most victorious coach in FBS NCAA football history.

Year	Team	Overall	Conference	Standing	Bowl/playoffs	Coaches^{#}	AP^{°}
Penn State Nittany Lions (NCAA University Division / Division I / Division I-A independent) (1966–1992)
1966	Penn State	5–5					
1967	Penn State	8–2–1			T Gator	11	10
1968	Penn State	11–0			W Orange	3	2
1969	Penn State	11–0			W Orange	2	2
1970	Penn State	7–3				19	18
1971	Penn State	11–1			W Cotton	11	5
1972	Penn State	10–2			L Sugar	8	10
1973	Penn State	12–0			W Orange	5	5
1974	Penn State	10–2			W Cotton	7	7
1975	Penn State	9–3			L Sugar	10	10
1976	Penn State	7–5			L Gator		
1977	Penn State	11–1			W Fiesta	4	5
1978	Penn State	11–1			L Sugar	4	4
1979	Penn State	8–4			W Liberty	18	20
1980	Penn State	10–2			W Fiesta	8	8
1981	Penn State	10–2			W Fiesta	3	3
1982	Penn State	11–1			W Sugar	1	1
1983	Penn State	8–4–1			W Aloha Bowl	17	
1984	Penn State	6–5					
1985	Penn State	11–1			L Orange	3	3
1986	Penn State	12–0			W Fiesta	1	1
1987	Penn State	8–4			L Florida Citrus		
1988	Penn State	5–6					
1989	Penn State	8–3–1			W Holiday	14	15
1990	Penn State	9–3			L Blockbuster	10	11
1991	Penn State	11–2			W Fiesta	3	3
1992	Penn State	7–5			L Blockbuster^{†}	24	
Penn State Nittany Lions (Big Ten Conference) (1993–2011)
1993	Penn State	10–2	6–2	3rd	W Florida Citrus	7	8
1994	Penn State	12–0	8–0	1st	W Rose	2	2
1995	Penn State	9–3	5–3	T–3rd	W Outback	12	13
1996	Penn State	11–2	6–2	T–3rd	W Fiesta^{†}	7	7
1997	Penn State	9–3	6–2	T–2nd	L Florida Citrus	17	16
1998	Penn State	9–3	5–3	5th	W Outback	15	17
1999	Penn State	10–3	5–3	T–4th	W Alamo	11	11
2000	Penn State	5–7	4–4	T–6th			
2001	Penn State	5–6	4–4	T–4th			
2002	Penn State	9–4	5–3	4th	L Capital One	15	16
2003	Penn State	3–9	1–7	T–8th			
2004	Penn State	4–7	2–6	9th			
2005	Penn State	11–1	7–1	T–1st	W Orange^{†}	3	3
2006	Penn State	9–4	5–3	T–4th	W Outback	25	24
2007	Penn State	9–4	4–4	T–5th	W Alamo	25	
2008	Penn State	11–2	7–1	T–1st	L Rose^{†}	8	8
2009	Penn State	11–2	6–2	T–2nd	W Capital One	8	9
2010	Penn State	7–6	4–4	T–4th	L Outback		
2011	Penn State	8–1 (Note: Paterno coached the first nine games of the season before he was fired on November 9. Tom Bradley was named interim head coach to replace him. Penn State credits the first nine games to Paterno, and the final four to Bradley.)	5–0	(Leaders)			
Penn State:		409–136–3	95–54				
Total:		409–136–3					
National championship Conference title Conference division title or championship game berth
^{†}Indicates Bowl Coalition, Bowl Alliance or BCS bowl.; ^{#}Rankings from final Coaches Poll.; ^{°}Rankings from final AP Poll.

== Coaching tree ==
Assistant coaches under Paterno who became NFL or NCAA head coaches:

- Joe McMullen: San Jose State (1969–1970)
- George Welsh: Navy (1973–1981), Virginia (1982–2000)
- Jim Weaver: Villanova (1974, acting)
- George Landis: Bloomsburg Huskies football (1982–1985), Bucknell (1986–1988)
- Dick Anderson: Rutgers (1984–1989)
- John Rosenberg: Brown (1984–1989)
- Bob Tucker: Wooster (1985–1994)
- Rip Scherer: James Madison (1991–1994), Memphis (1995–2000)
- Bill Bowes: New Hampshire (1992–1998)
- Jim Caldwell: Wake Forest (1993–2000), Indianapolis Colts (2009–2011), Detroit Lions (2014–2017)
- Greg Gattuso: Duquesne (1993–2004), Albany (2014–present)
- Ron Dickerson: Temple (1993–1997), Alabama State (1998–1999), Lambuth (2010)
- Craig Cirbus: Buffalo (1995–2000)
- Paul Shaffner: Glenville State (2000–2003), Buffalo State (2004–2008)
- Greg Schiano: Rutgers (2001–2011, 2020–present), Tampa Bay Buccaneers (2012–2013)
- Dave Opfar: Saint Francis (2002–2009)
- Al Golden: Temple (2006–2010), Miami (2011–2015)
- Frank Spaziani: Boston College Eagles (2009–2012)
- Darryl Bullock: North Carolina Central (2010, interim)
- Tom Bradley: Penn State (2011, interim)
- Jamie Barresi: Ottawa (2013–2019)
- Kenny Carter: Delaware State (2015–2017)
- Earnest Wilson: Savannah State (2013–2015), Elizabeth City (2015–2016)
- Matt Rhule: Temple (2013–2016), Baylor (2017–2019), Carolina Panthers (2020–2022), Nebraska (2023–present)
- Larry Johnson: Ohio State (2021, acting)
- Paul Alexander: Dresden Monarchs (2023)

Players under Paterno who became NFL or NCAA head coaches:

- Al Golden: Temple (2006–2010), Miami (2011–2015)
- Mike Munchak: Tennessee Titans (2011–2013)
- Paul Pasqualoni: Connecticut (2011–2013)
- Matt Rhule: Temple (2013–2016), Baylor (2017–2019), Carolina Panthers (2020–2022), Nebraska (2023–present)

Players under Paterno who became general managers or executives in the NFL:

- Matt Millen: Detroit Lions (2001–2008)

== See also ==
- List of college football career coaching wins leaders
- List of college football seasons coached leaders
- List of College Football Hall of Fame inductees (coaches)
