= Reds Bagnell Award =

- Awarded for: Contributions to the Game of Football
- Country: United States
- Presented by: Maxwell Football Club
- First award: 1989
- Website: Reds Bagnell Award

The Reds Bagnell Award is presented annually to an individual for their contributions to the game of American football. The award is presented by the Maxwell Football Club. It is named for longtime Club president and College Football Hall of Fame member Reds Bagnell.

== Winners ==
Year	Winner	Contribution
2023	Steve Hatchell	President and CEO of National Football Foundation
2022	Roman Oben	Former NFL OL, NFL VP of Football Operations
2021	Ray Didinger	NBC Sports Philadelphia
2019	Troy Vincent	Former NFL Quarterback, EVP of Football Operations
2018	Ron Jaworski	Former NFL Quarterback, NFL analyst on ESPN
2017	Bobby Bowden	Florida State University
2016	Steve Spurrier	University South Carolina
2015	Joe Browne	NFL Executive Vice President
2014	Lou Holtz	Former College Coach/ESPN
2013	Dick Vermeil	Philadelphia Eagles
2012	Ozzie Newsome	Baltimore Ravens
2011	Archie Manning	National Football Foundation (NFF) Chairman
2010	George Bodenheimer	ESPN
2009	Robert T. Clark	Former Executive director of the Maxwell Football Club
2008	Steve Sabol	President of NFL Films
2007	Ralph Wilson	Owner and president of the NFL's Buffalo Bills
2006	Ernie Accorsi	Former GM of the NY Giants
2005	Darrell Royal	Former Head Coach University of Texas
2004	Vince Dooley	Former University of Georgia head coach
2003	Art McNally	Head of NFL officials
2002	Pat Summerall	Broadcaster
2001	Chris Berman	Host of ESPN's NFL Prime Time
2000	Don Shula	Former Miami Dolphins head coach
1999	Joe Paterno	Pennsylvania State University
1998	Dan Rooney	Pittsburgh Steelers
1997	Carl Peterson	Kansas City Chiefs
1996	Jerry Richardson	Carolina Panthers
1995	Otho Davis	Philadelphia Eagles
1994	Ed Sabol	NFL Films
1993	Don Ohlmeyer	NBC-TV
1992	Lamar Hunt	Kansas City Chiefs
1991	William Manlove	Widener University
1990	Eddie Robinson	Grambling University
1989	Pete Rozelle	NFL Commissioner
