= George Munger Award =

College football award

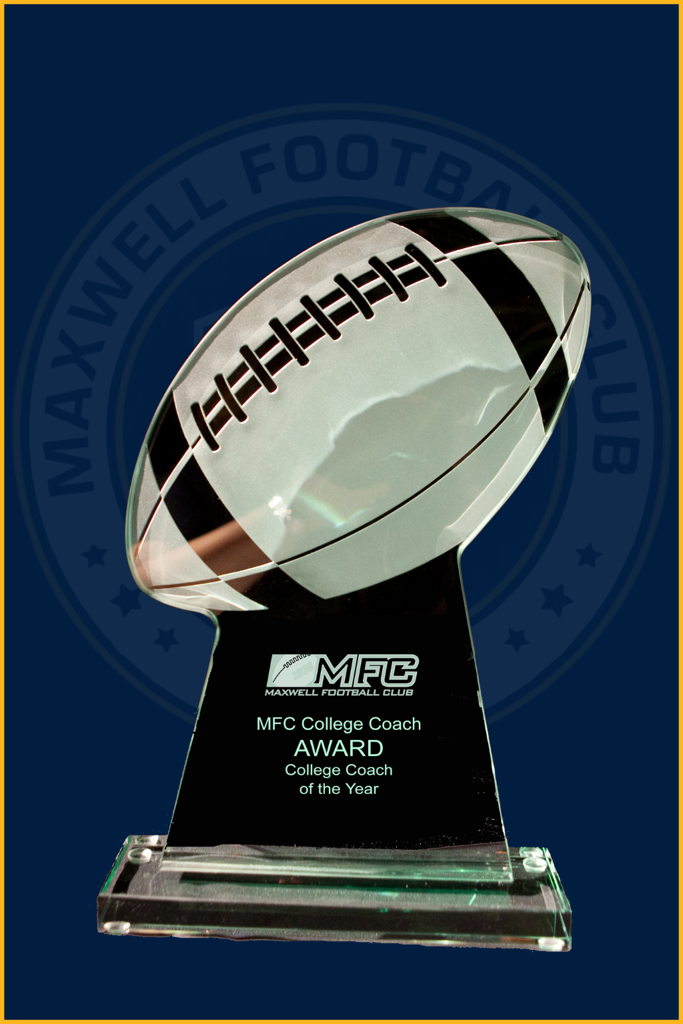
- Awarded for: College Coach of the Year
- Country: United States
- Presented by: Maxwell Football Club

History
- First award: 1989
- Most recent: Curt Cignetti
- Website: maxwellfootballclub.org

The George Munger Award is presented to the NCAA Division I college football coach of the year by the Maxwell Football Club. The award was named after former University of Pennsylvania head coach George Munger. People who voted for the winners of the award included NCAA head coaches, members of the Maxwell Club, and sportswriters from all over the country.

In March 2010, the Maxwell Football Club announced that the award would be replaced by the Joseph V. Paterno Award. Following the breaking of the Penn State sex abuse scandal in November 2011, the club announced that the Paterno award would be discontinued. The Maxwell Club later returned Munger's name to the award.

== Winners ==
Year	Winner	Team	Ref
1989	Bo Schembechler	Michigan	
1990	Joe Paterno †	Penn State	
1991	Don James	Washington	
1992	Gene Stallings	Alabama	
1993	Terry Bowden	Auburn	
1994	Joe Paterno (2) †	Penn State (2)	
1995	Gary Barnett	Northwestern	
1996	Bruce Snyder	Arizona State	
1997	Lloyd Carr	Michigan (2)	
1998	Phillip Fulmer	Tennessee	
1999	Frank Beamer	Virginia Tech	
2000	Bob Stoops	Oklahoma	
2001	Ralph Friedgen	Maryland	
2002	Tyrone Willingham	Notre Dame	
2003	Pete Carroll	USC	
2004	Urban Meyer	Utah	
2005	Joe Paterno (3) †	Penn State (3)	
2006	Greg Schiano	Rutgers	
2007	Mark Mangino	Kansas	
2008	Mike Leach	Texas Tech	
2009	Gary Patterson	TCU	
2010	Frank Beamer (2)	Virginia Tech (2)	
2011	Brady Hoke	Michigan (3)	
2012	Bill O'Brien	Penn State (4)	
2013	David Cutcliffe	Duke	
2014	Dan Mullen	Mississippi State	
2015	Dabo Swinney	Clemson	
2016	Nick Saban	Alabama (2)	
2017	Kirby Smart	Georgia	
2018	Jeff Monken	Army	
2019	Ed Orgeron	LSU	
2020	Jamey Chadwell	Coastal Carolina	
2021	Dave Aranda	Baylor	
2022	Willie Fritz	Tulane	
2023	Kalen DeBoer	Washington	
2024	Marcus Freeman	Notre Dame (2)	
2025	Curt Cignetti	Indiana	

Note: † = The 1990, 1994, and 2005 awards had been given to Joe Paterno of Penn State, but the Maxwell Sports Club has rescinded the awards for those years and removed his name in the aftermath of the Penn State child sex abuse scandal and Paterno's firing.
