= Joseph V. Paterno Award =

College football award

- Awarded for: the collegiate football coach who shows dedication to the development of student-athletes and the advancement of the university beyond just athletics.
- Country: United States
- Presented by: Maxwell Football Club

History
- First award: 2010
- Final award: 2010
- Most recent: Frank Beamer

The Joseph V. Paterno Award was an award that was awarded to college football coach Frank Beamer in 2010. Originally the award was intended to be awarded annually to the college football head coach who best exemplified "Penn State head coach Joe Paterno’s dedication to the development of student-athletes and the advancement of the university beyond just athletics".

The award was presented by the Maxwell Football Club, based out of Ambler, Pennsylvania. It replaced the George Munger Award, which was presented by the club each year from 1989 to 2009.

Following the breaking of the Penn State sex abuse scandal in November 2011, the club announced that the award would be discontinued.

== Award criteria ==
To determine the winner of the award in 2010, the staff of the Maxwell Football Club solicited nominations from 69 FBS schools. Winning and exceeding expectations on the field were vital components of the evaluation process, but the club also reviewed graduation rates of the players and the coach’s overall impact on the community, including philanthropic and volunteer efforts. The award was meant to exemplify the tag line that is given for the award, i.e., "Excellence Doesn’t Stop on Saturdays".

== Winner ==
Year	Winner	School
2010	Frank Beamer	Virginia Tech
