= Penn State child sex abuse scandal =

The Penn State child sex abuse scandal concerned allegations and subsequent convictions of child sexual abuse committed by Jerry Sandusky, an assistant coach for the Penn State Nittany Lions football team, over a period of at least fifteen years. The scandal began to emerge in March 2011 and broke in early November 2011 when Sandusky was indicted on 52 counts of child molestation, stemming from incidents that occurred between 1994 and 2009. Sandusky was ultimately convicted on 45 counts of child sexual abuse on June 22, 2012, and was sentenced to a minimum of 30 years and a maximum of 60 years in prison. Of the 10 victims who were listed, only eight appeared at trial. All were over the age of 18 by the time they testified. Six were over 21.

Additionally, three Penn State officials, school president Graham Spanier, vice president Gary Schultz, and athletic director Tim Curley, were charged with perjury, obstruction of justice, failure to report suspected child abuse, and related charges. The Penn State Board of Trustees commissioned an independent investigation by former FBI Director Louis Freeh, whose report stated that Penn State's longtime head football coach Joe Paterno, along with Spanier, Curley and Schultz, had known about allegations of child abuse by Sandusky as early as 1998, had shown "total and consistent disregard...for the safety and welfare of Sandusky's child victims", and "empowered" Sandusky to continue his acts of abuse by failing to disclose them. Shortly after the scandal broke, Spanier resigned. The board of trustees terminated the contracts of Paterno and Curley.

As a result of the scandal, the National Collegiate Athletic Association (NCAA) imposed sanctions on the Penn State football program: a $60 million fine, a four-year postseason ban, scholarship reductions, and a revocation of all victories from 1998 to 2011. These sanctions were among the most severe ever imposed on an NCAA member school. NCAA President Mark Emmert stated that the sanctions were levied "not to be just punitive, but to make sure the university establishes an athletic culture and daily mindset in which football will never again be placed ahead of educating, nurturing and protecting young people." The Big Ten Conference subsequently imposed an additional $13 million fine.

The Paterno family retained former Attorney General Richard Thornburgh to conduct a review of the Freeh report, which concluded that the report constituted a "rush to injustice" that could not be relied upon and that Freeh's evidence fell "far short" of showing that Joe Paterno attempted to conceal the scandal, but rather that "the contrary is true". In January 2013, state senator Jake Corman and state treasurer Rob McCord sued the NCAA, seeking to overturn the Penn State sanctions on the basis that Freeh had been actively collaborating with the organization and that due process had not been followed. In November 2014, Corman released emails showing "regular and substantive" contact between Freeh's investigators and the NCAA, suggesting that Freeh's conclusions were orchestrated. As part of a settlement, the NCAA restored the 111 wins to Paterno's record on January 16, 2015.

On March 25, 2017, Curley, Schultz, and Spanier pleaded or were found guilty of misdemeanor charges of child endangerment. All conspiracy charges against Curley and Schultz were dropped, and Spanier was acquitted of conspiracy, the charges central to Louis Freeh's allegation of a cover-up. In June 2017, all three were sentenced to jail terms, fines, and probation for the misdemeanors. Spanier was sentenced to four to twelve months in jail, a $7,500 fine, and two years of probation. Spanier's misdemeanor conviction was overturned by the federal district court, but reinstated by the court of appeals in December 2020.

== Background ==
Jerry Sandusky was an assistant coach for the Penn State Nittany Lions football team from 1969 to 1999. For the last 23 of those years, Sandusky was the team's defensive coordinator. In 1977, he founded The Second Mile in State College, Pennsylvania, a charity formed to help disadvantaged youth. Sandusky retired from the organization in 2010. In 1998, he was investigated for child sexual abuse but no charges were filed. Sandusky was considered for spearheading the startup of a football program at Penn State Altoona in 1998–99, but the idea was scrapped and he retired in 1999. After his retirement, Sandusky remained a coach emeritus with an office in and access to Penn State's football facilities per his employment contract.

== Criminal prosecutions ==
=== Investigation ===
In Pennsylvania, a grand jury only recommends criminal charges. It hears all of the available evidence but does not have authority to indict the accused. In the case of Sandusky, the grand jury investigation began in 2009 under commonwealth attorney general and later-governor Tom Corbett. The grand jury subpoenaed records from both Penn State and The Second Mile and heard testimony from Victim 1 (Aaron Fisher), Mike McQueary, Joe Paterno, Tim Curley, Gary Schultz, Victim 7, Graham Spanier, Victim 4, and Ronald Petrosky (Penn State janitor). This grand jury did not recommend indictment.

Commonwealth attorney general Linda L. Kelly prepared a presentment which included credibility determinations about the testimonies received before the first grand jury for the second grand jury. This second grand jury heard testimony from Victim 3, Victim 5, and Victim 6. Kelly said that during the investigation there was an "uncooperative atmosphere" from some Penn State officials.

==== Victim 1 ====
The investigation was initiated in the spring of 2008 after Aaron Fisher (identified in court papers as "Victim 1"), then a freshman at Central Mountain High School in Mill Hall, Pennsylvania, reported that Sandusky had been molesting him since age 12. Fisher met Sandusky through The Second Mile in the mid-2000s, when Sandusky began making advances toward Fisher which involved "inappropriate touching". At the time of the alleged actions, Sandusky was volunteering as an assistant football coach at Central Mountain High School, where these assaults took place.

==== Victim 2 ====
Mike McQueary, then a graduate assistant and later assistant coach at Penn State, testified that on approximately February 9, 2001, he had been inside the Lasch Football Building, located on Penn State's University Park campus, when he witnessed a naked Sandusky standing directly behind a boy whose hands were up on the wall in the men's shower room. McQueary, distraught, left the building and called his father John, who told Mike to come over to his house right away and talk to him. While Mike was on the way to his father's, John called Dr. Jonathan Dranov, Mike's boss and family friend, seeking his advice. As President of Centre Medical and Surgical Associates, Dranov was a mandated reporter in the state of Pennsylvania. Dranov testified that he questioned Mike three times about what he saw, and each time Mike kept going back to what he witnessed. Because there was no clear crime witnessed by Mike, Dranov and John recommended he talk to head football coach Joe Paterno.

On Saturday morning, Mike McQueary called Paterno to arrange a meeting, and the two met at Paterno's home later that same morning. McQueary testified he gave a rough report of what he had seen but that, out of respect, he did not share more graphic details. Paterno left for Pittsburgh to attend an awards ceremony shortly after meeting with McQueary and did not return to State College until late Saturday night or Sunday morning. On Sunday morning, Paterno called then-athletic director Tim Curley regarding the incident. Curley, along with then-university vice president Gary Schultz, both went to Paterno's home, where Paterno told them about McQueary's story and advised them to speak directly to McQueary themselves to get the full details. In his grand jury testimony, Paterno said that he was told about Sandusky "fondling or doing something of a sexual nature" to the victim.

On Monday, Curley and Schultz reported the incident to Graham Spanier, who was president of Penn State at the time. Spanier told them to meet with the graduate assistant, which he was not told to be McQueary. Nine or ten days later (the exact date is unknown), McQueary received a phone call from Curley regarding the incident and set up a meeting with Curley and Schultz in the Bryce Jordan Center, either that same afternoon or the next day, to go over the details of what had happened in the shower room. Curley and Schultz both denied having been told about alleged anal intercourse. Curley denied that McQueary reported anything of a sexual nature whatsoever and described the conduct as merely "horsing around". Spanier likewise testified that he was only apprised of an incident involving Sandusky and a younger child "horsing around in the shower".

Curley then met with Sandusky and told him he was not to be using Penn State's athletic facilities with any young people, and Curley reported the incident to Jack Raykovitz, who, as the CEO of The Second Mile, was Sandusky's boss and also a mandated reporter. The Second Mile fell under the direct supervision and authority of Pennsylvania's Department of Public Welfare, and was a contractor of the local county office of Children and Youth Services. Raykovitz was also a highly trained professional on handling such allegations. He reported the incident to two board members of The Second Mile, Bruce Heim and Bob Poole, and told Sandusky to wear shorts in the shower in the future. Despite Penn State banning Sandusky from bringing boys onto the main campus after the McQueary incident, he was allowed to operate a summer camp through his Sandusky Associates company from 2002 to 2008 at Penn State's Behrend satellite campus near Erie, where he had daily contact with boys from fourth grade to high school.

==== Other victims ====
One child's mother reported a 1998 incident to Penn State police when her son came home with his hair wet. After an investigation by Detective Ronald Shreffler, Centre County District Attorney Ray Gricar chose not to prosecute. Shreffler testified before the grand jury that the director of the campus police then told him to drop the case, and that detectives had eavesdropped on conversations during which the mother confronted Sandusky about the incident. Sandusky admitted to showering with other boys and refused to discontinue the practice. Gricar was not available to testify, as he had disappeared in 2005.

Victims also commonly reported that Sandusky would place his hand on their thighs or inside the waistband of their underpants. Two recounted oral sex with Sandusky, sometimes culminating in his ejaculation. Penn State janitor James Calhoun reportedly observed Sandusky performing oral sex on an unidentified boy in 2000, but by the time of Sandusky's trial Calhoun was in a nursing home suffering from dementia; he was deemed not competent to testify.

==== Locations of assaults ====
According to the grand jury testimony, the assaults took place:

- in Sandusky's basement,
- at a victim's high school,
- in Sandusky's car,
- in the Lasch Football Building on Penn State's University Park campus,
- at Toftrees Golf Resort and Conference Center,
- in the East Area Locker Rooms on the Penn State campus, and
- in a hotel room in Texas.

At least twenty of the incidents were said to have taken place while Sandusky was still employed by Penn State.

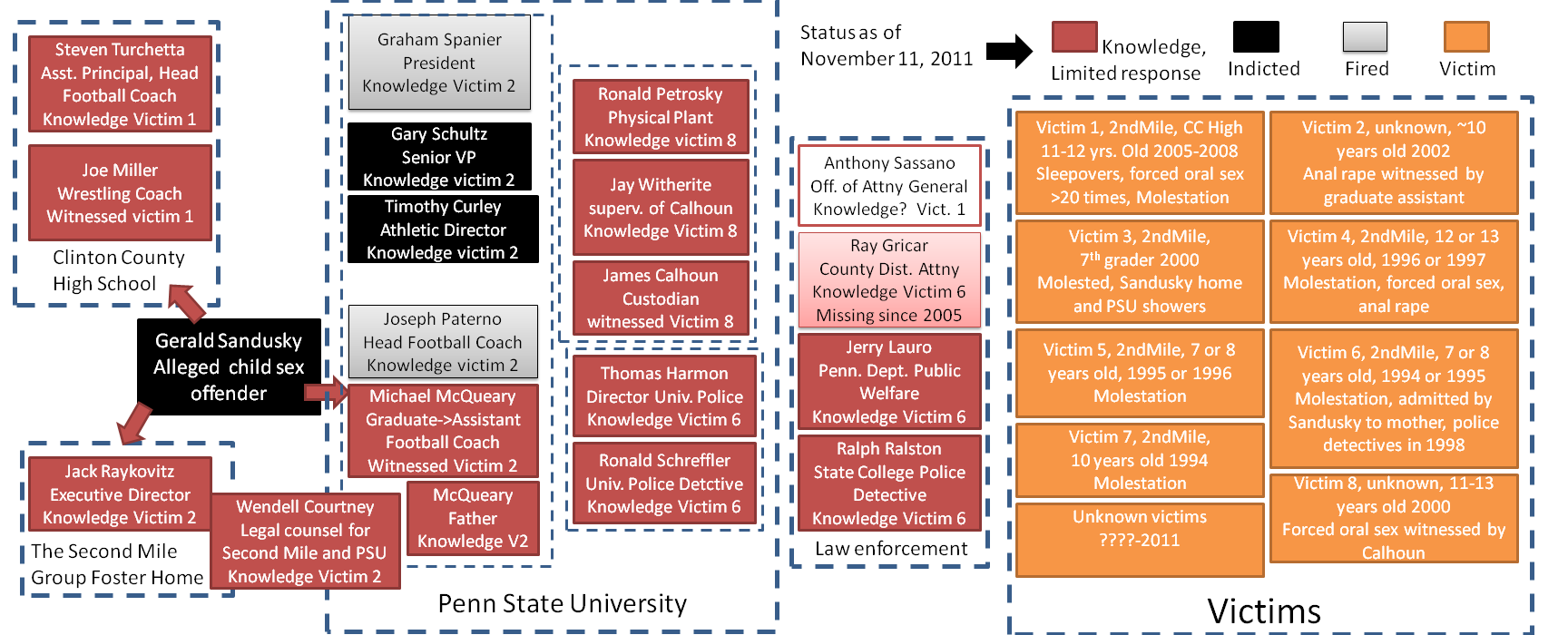
Illustration of victims, people with alleged knowledge of alleged crimes, and official responses as of November 11, 2011

=== Indictments ===
On November 4, 2011, commonwealth attorney general Linda L. Kelly indicted Sandusky on forty counts of sex crimes against young boys following a three-year investigation. Sandusky was arrested on November 5 and charged with seven counts of involuntary deviate sexual intercourse, as well as eight counts of corruption of minors, eight counts of endangering the welfare of a child, seven counts of indecent assault, and other offenses. Penn State officially banned Sandusky from campus on November 6. He was arrested again at his residence on December 7, 2011, on additional charges of sexual abuse.

Schultz and Curley, who had been found to be not credible by the grand jury, were charged with perjury and failure to report suspected child abuse. The indictment accused Curley and Schultz of not only failing to tell the police, but falsely telling the grand jury that McQueary never informed them of sexual activity. Sandusky was then released on $250,000 bail pending trial. Curley and Schultz appeared in a Harrisburg courtroom on November 7, where a judge set bail at $75,000 and required them to surrender their passports. Curley was placed on administrative leave, and Schultz resigned to go back into retirement. Spanier was criticized for issuing a statement expressing support for Curley and Schultz, while failing to express any concern for Sandusky's alleged victims.

Congressman Pat Meehan asked Education Secretary Arne Duncan to probe whether Penn State violated the Clery Act when it failed to report Sandusky's alleged actions on campus. Duncan announced an investigation into possible Clery Act violations at Penn State, saying that colleges and universities have "a legal and moral responsibility to protect children" and that Penn State's failure to report the alleged abuse would be a "tragedy". Officials in San Antonio, Texas also began investigating whether Sandusky molested one of the victims at the 1999 Alamo Bowl.

On February 24, 2012, the Harrisburg Patriot-News reported that U.S. Attorney Peter J. Smith was conducting a federal criminal investigation into Penn State – separate from the Clery Act investigation – in which he subpoenaed the school for information about Spanier, Sandusky, Curley, Schultz and The Second Mile. Specifically, Smith subpoenaed information about Sandusky's travel records in relation to allegations that he had molested boys at both the 1999 Alamo Bowl in San Antonio and the 1999 Outback Bowl in Tampa, Florida. Although federal authorities would have jurisdiction in the case since Sandusky was accused of taking the boys across state lines, three former prosecutors interviewed by The Patriot-News believed that this investigation did not appear to be focusing on Sandusky, but instead on a possible coverup by school officials.

=== Commonwealth v. Sandusky ===
==== Trial ====
During Sandusky's trial, an accuser and Sandusky's wife Dottie both testified about the Alamo Bowl incident. The accuser said Sandusky was attempting to negotiate oral sex with him in a bathroom while Dottie was in the apartment, and that she came to the "edge" of the bathroom for a few words with Sandusky including, "What are you doing in there?" Dottie said Sandusky was having a disagreement, including yelling, with the boy—who she said was in the bathroom, but "clothed"—about attending a luncheon. She went on to characterize the boy as "very demanding. ... And he was very conniving. And he wanted his way, and he didn't listen a whole lot." Dottie testified when it was still uncertain whether Sandusky would testify. Though Sandusky's defense attorney Joe Amendola had said on the opening day of the trial that he would testify, Amendola ultimately rested the case without calling Sandusky to testify in his own defense.

==== Verdict ====
On the evening of June 22, 2012, the jury found Sandusky guilty on 45 of the 48 counts against him. Following the announcement of the verdict, Judge John Cleland immediately revoked Sandusky's bail and ordered him to be taken into custody to await sentencing. Sandusky continued to maintain his innocence even after being convicted. His attorneys filed a notice to appeal the conviction.

==== Sentencing ====
Sandusky faced a maximum sentence of 442 years in prison. According to NBC News, he likely faced a minimum sentence of 60 years – at his age, effectively a life sentence. Sentencing was scheduled for October 9, 2012. At that hearing, prosecutors requested to the court that Sandusky be declared a sexually violent predator under Pennsylvania's version of Megan's Law, which would subject him to stringent reporting requirements if he is released. He would not only have to report his address to police every three months for the rest of his life, but would also have to participate in a court-approved counseling program. However, given his age, Sandusky will likely die in prison. Earlier, on August 30, the Pennsylvania Sexual Offenders Assessment Board recommended that Sandusky be declared a sexually violent predator.

On the day of sentencing, Sandusky was officially designated a sexually violent predator. He was sentenced on October 9, 2012, to a minimum of 30 years and a maximum of 60 years in prison. Judge Cleland told Sandusky that he intentionally avoided a sentence with a large number of years, saying it would be "too abstract." Nonetheless, he still felt the need to pronounce a sentence that would have the "unmistakable impact of saying 'the rest of your life' (in prison)". He is presently not slated to be released until October 9, 2042, when he will be 98 years old.

=== Commonwealth v. Curley, Schultz, and Spanier ===
On November 1, 2012, the Pittsburgh Post-Gazette and NBC News, citing sources close to the investigation, reported that Spanier would be formally charged for his alleged role related to Sandusky's crimes. Later that day, Kelly announced that as part of a superseding indictment, Spanier, Curley and Schultz had been charged with grand jury perjury, child endangerment, conspiracy, and obstruction of justice in connection with the scandal. Spanier faced eight charges, three of which were felonies. A criminal docket was filed in the Court of Common Pleas of Dauphin County, in Harrisburg, Pennsylvania.

Preliminary hearings for Curley and Schultz were held on December 16, 2011. Prosecution presented several witnesses. McQueary took the stand again and testified that, on the night of the 2001 incident, he saw a 10- to 12-year-old Caucasian boy standing upright in the shower, facing the wall, and Sandusky directly behind him, with Sandusky's hands wrapped around the boy's "waist or midsection". McQueary estimated that the boy was roughly a foot shorter than Sandusky. He further stated that he "did not see insertion nor was there any verbiage or protest, screaming or yelling" and denied ever using the words "anal" or "rape" to describe the incident to anybody.

On July 30, 2013, Spanier, Schultz, and Curley were ordered by Judge William Wenner to stand trial. On January 22, 2016, some of the charges against Curley, Schultz, and Spanier were dropped due to the violation of their rights to legal representation.

On March 24, 2017, Spanier was found guilty of one charge of child endangerment and not guilty of the second charge of child endangerment or conspiracy. Curley and Schultz had previously pleaded guilty to misdemeanor child endangerment charges and testified at Spanier's trial in exchange for all other charges, including conspiracy, being dropped. On June 2, 2017, Spanier, Schultz and Curley were sentenced to prison by Senior Judge John Boccabella. "Why no one made a phone call to the police...is beyond me. Why Mr. Sandusky was allowed to continue to use the Penn State facilities is beyond me," Boccabella said.

Spanier was sentenced to four to twelve months with two months in jail and four months house arrest, followed by two years of probation and a $7,500 fine. Spanier's conviction was subsequently overturned on appeal. Spanier's conviction was reinstated in December 2020, and he served 58 days in prison in summer 2021. Curley was sentenced to a seven to 23-month jail term, with four months of it as house arrest, followed by two years of probation and a $5,000 fine. Schultz was sentenced to a six to 23-month jail term also with four months of it as house arrest, followed by two years of probation and a $5,000 fine.

== Reactions ==
=== Media ===
The Patriot-News was the first media outlet to report on the Sandusky grand jury investigation in March 2011. The story did not receive much attention outside of the immediate area, and many readers at the time assailed the newspaper for impugning the reputations of Sandusky and Penn State. Criminal charges against Sandusky were filed in November 2011. In April 2012, crime reporter Sara Ganim and members of the Patriot-News staff were awarded the Pulitzer Prize for Local Reporting for their coverage of the scandal.

Under Pennsylvania law of the time, any state employee who learned about suspected child abuse was required to report the incident to his immediate supervisor. In the case of the 2002 incident, McQueary reported the incident to his immediate supervisor, Paterno. In turn, Paterno reported the incident to his immediate supervisor, Curley, and also reported it to Schultz, to whom the University Police Department directly reported. For these reasons, Paterno and McQueary were not implicated in any criminal wrongdoing, since they did what they were legally required to do. However, once the incident came to light, Paterno was criticized for not going beyond the law to report the incident to police, or at least seeing to it that it was reported. Several advocates for victims of sexual abuse argued that Paterno should have faced charges for not going to the police himself when it was apparent Penn State officials were unwilling to act.

After McQueary was identified as the graduate assistant who reported the 2001 incident, he was criticized for not intervening to protect Sandusky's victim (an accusation McQueary has since disputed), as well as for not reporting the incident to police himself. On November 7, Pennsylvania State Police Commissioner Frank Noonan said that though some may have fulfilled their legal obligation to report suspected abuse, "somebody has to question about what I would consider the moral requirements for a human being that knows of sexual things that are taking place with a child." Noonan added that anyone who knows about suspected abuse, "whether you're a football coach or a university president or the guy sweeping the building" has "a moral responsibility to call us." Paterno said McQueary informed him that "he had witnessed an incident in the shower ... but he at no time related to me the very specific actions contained in the Grand Jury report." Paterno was uncertain if being more graphic would have made a difference. "And to be frank with you I don't know that it would have done any good, because I never heard of, of, rape and a man," said Paterno. When he read the presentment after it became public, he asked his son, "What is sodomy, anyway?"

Further, following reports of the arrests, criticism of Penn State leadership and Paterno himself included calls for their dismissal for allegedly "protecting Penn State's brand instead of a child" and allowing Sandusky to retain emeritus status and unfettered access to the university, despite knowledge of the allegations of sexual abuse. In an interview with New York City radio station WFAN, sports reporter Kim Jones, a Penn State alumna, stated that, "I can't believe [Paterno's] heart is that black, where he simply never thought about [Sandusky's 2001 incident] again and never thought about those poor kids who were looking for a male mentor, a strong man in their life." Former sports commentator Keith Olbermann called for Paterno to be immediately fired, saying that "he failed all of the kids—the kid kids and the player kids—he purported to be protecting." In an editorial for the Centre Daily Times, literary critic Robert Bernard Hass, a Penn State alumnus, compared Paterno's downfall to a Greek tragedy and suggested that despite his many good deeds, pride and age contributed to his failure to report the incident to police. The Patriot-News published a rare full-page, front-page editorial in its November 8, 2011, edition, calling for Spanier's immediate resignation as Penn State president; it also called for this to be Paterno's last season coaching Penn State football. The same day, an editorial in the Post-Gazette called for the resignations of both Paterno and McQueary.

On November 14, Sandusky gave his first interview after being arrested. In a phone interview with NBC Sports's Bob Costas on Rock Center with Brian Williams, Sandusky denied the allegations, though he admitted showering with boys and inadvertently touching them "without intent of sexual contact". The interview received substantial coverage in the media, particularly regarding the manner in which Sandusky answered Costas when asked if he was sexually attracted to young boys:

COSTAS: "Are you sexually attracted to young boys, to underage boys?"

SANDUSKY: "Am I sexually attracted to underage boys?"
COSTAS: "Yes."

SANDUSKY: "Sexually attracted, you know, I enjoy young people. I love to be around them. But no, I'm not sexually attracted to young boys."

The day of the interview, Sandusky's lawyer claimed that he was able to track down Victim 2 and that, according to the child, the incident did not occur as described by McQueary. However, in the days following the interview, several potential victims contacted State College lawyer Andy Shubin alleging abuse by Sandusky, with one accuser reporting an abusive encounter with Sandusky in the 1970s.

The media began to run various accounts of Penn State culture, as well as the prominence and power of football and of Paterno within it. Former Penn State employees, including a former vice president of student affairs Vickey Triponey, and former football grad assistant Matt Paknis – himself a child abuse survivor who admitted he noticed but failed to report Sandusky's behavior – stepped forward to critique the influence of the school's football program. Further stories detailed the loss of sponsorships, the damage to Penn State's merchandise sales, brand, student admissions, and the impact of the scandal on recent graduates.

On November 23, 2011, the editor of the Patriot-News wrote a column criticizing The New York Times for insufficiently protecting the identity of Victim 1. The Times both defended its reporting and published public editor criticism of the reporting.

On December 3, 2014, KDKA-TV in Pittsburgh reported that Sandusky received a letter from Penn State asking to renew his season ticket plan for the football team and attend a "recruiting" trip to a Penn State basketball game. The letter was reportedly sent out in error.

=== The Second Mile ===
Jack Raykovitz, the longtime president and CEO of The Second Mile, announced his resignation on November 14. In addition, the Congressional Coalition on Adoption Institute's Angels in Adoption program subsequently rescinded its earlier 2002 award to Sandusky for his work with The Second Mile "in light of the serious allegations against him, and to preserve the integrity of the Angels in Adoption program."

=== Penn State ===
The allegations impacted personnel and operations for Penn State. Penn State responded in various ways.

==== Ousting of Spanier, Curley, Paterno, and Schultz ====
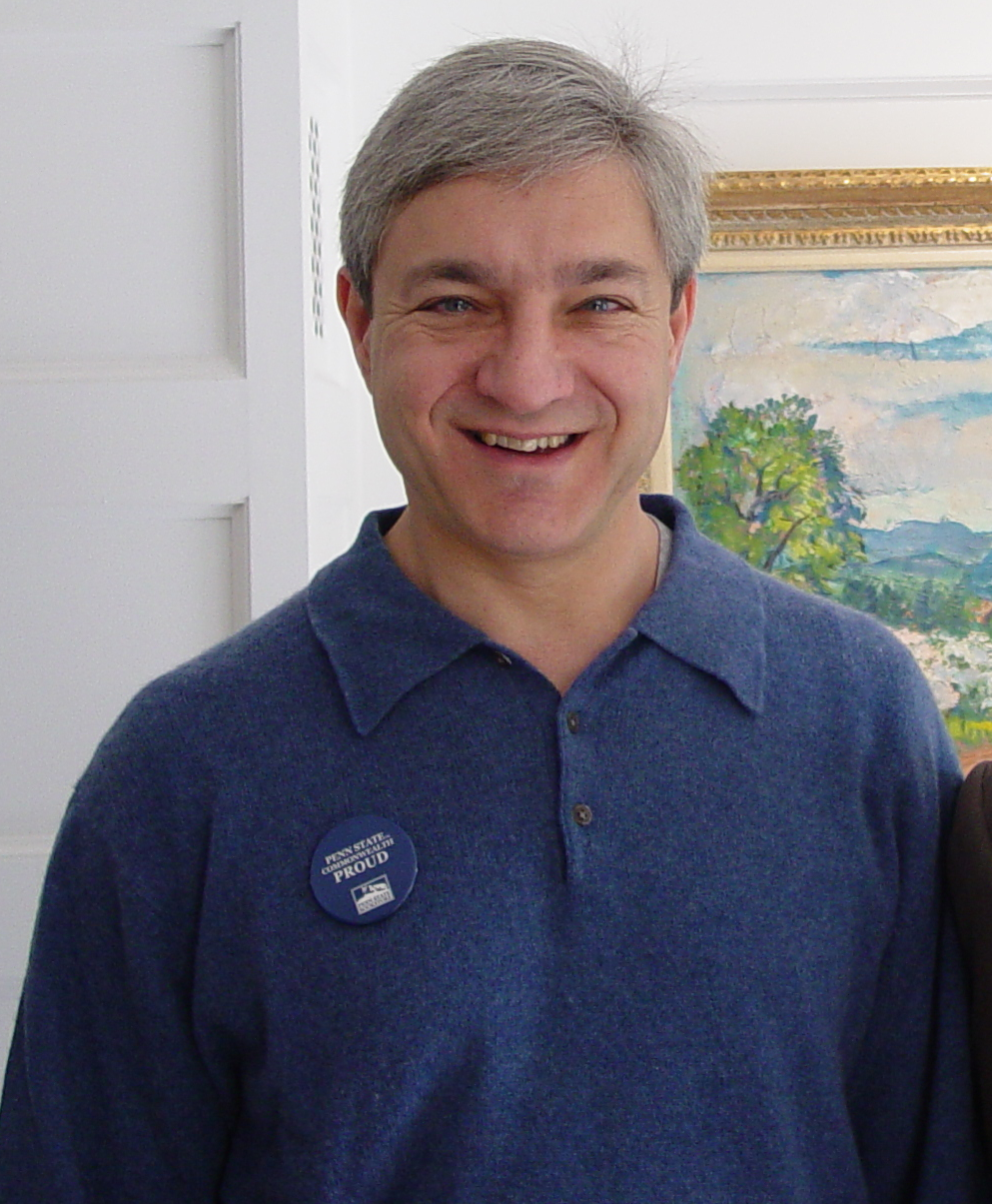
Penn State President Graham Spanier released a statement of support for Curley and Schultz before being forced to resign.

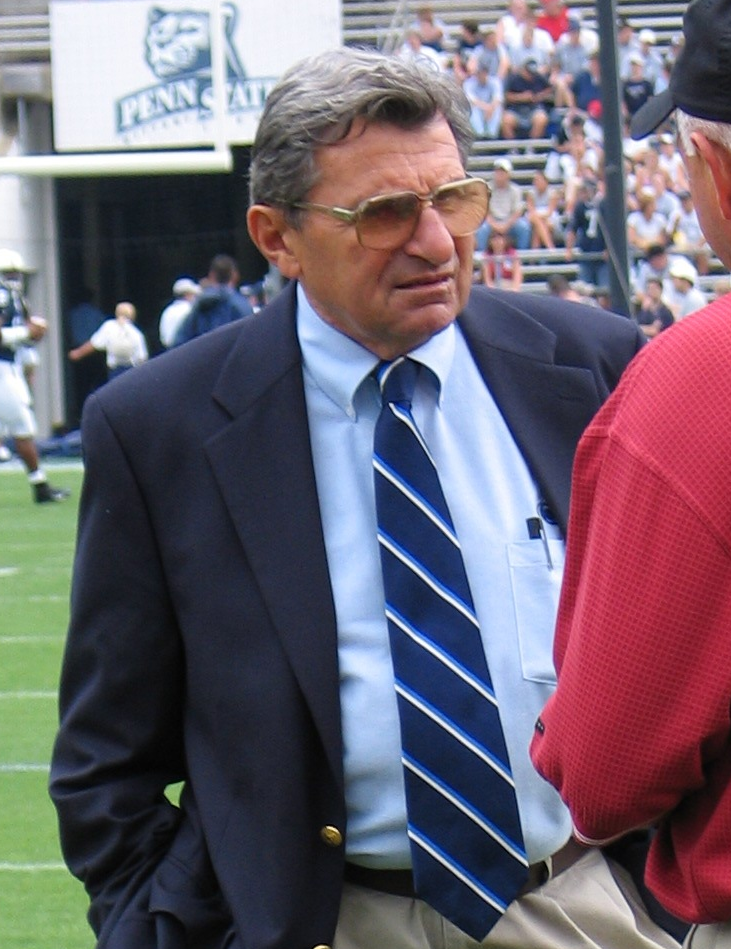
Joe Paterno was heavily criticized for his reaction to the allegations and was subsequently fired in the middle of the 2011 season.

On November 8, 2011, Spanier canceled Paterno's weekly Tuesday press conference, citing legal concerns. It was to have been the coach's first public appearance since Sandusky's arrest. Paterno later reported that Spanier canceled the press conference without providing him with an explanation. That same day, The New York Times reported that Penn State was planning Paterno's exit at the close of the 2011 college football season. Based on interviews with two individuals briefed on conversations among top university officials, the Times reported: "The Board of Trustees has yet to determine the precise timing of Mr. Paterno's exit, but it is clear that (he) will not coach another season." The following day, Associated Press reported that Paterno had decided to retire at the end of the 2011 season, saying that he didn't want to be a distraction. In a statement announcing his retirement, Paterno said, "It is one of the great sorrows of my life. With the benefit of hindsight, I wish I had done more."

On the afternoon of November 9, Easton Express-Times reported that the board had given Spanier an ultimatum—resign before that night's meeting or be fired. At that night's meeting, Spanier offered his immediate resignation. The board accepted it and named provost Rodney Erickson as interim president. Several Penn State sources told StateCollege.com and the Patriot-News that Spanier and vice chairman John Surma mutually agreed that the best way forward for all involved would be for Spanier to resign "voluntarily and with grace." At the same meeting, the Board turned down Paterno's proposal to finish out the season and instead stripped him of his coaching duties immediately; defensive coordinator Tom Bradley was named the interim coach for the remainder of the season.

During the week after Paterno's firing, the Big Ten Conference removed his name from the championship trophy for its conference championship game, renaming it the Stagg Championship Trophy. The inaugural game was scheduled for December 2011, and the trophy was originally named the Stagg–Paterno Championship Trophy after both Paterno and Amos Alonzo Stagg, a college football pioneer. In addition, the Maxwell Football Club announced that the Joseph V. Paterno Award, presented to the college football coach who did the most to develop his players both on and off the field, would be discontinued.

An attorney retained by the families of some of Sandusky's victims criticized the decision by the Board to fire Paterno, saying, "The school let the victims down once, and I think they owed it to the victims to at least gauge how the immediate termination decision would impact them as opposed to Mr. Paterno's resignation at the end of the year." However, one of the trustees told Allentown Morning Call that the Board had no choice but to force Paterno to leave immediately to contain the growing outrage over the scandal. According to the trustee, the Board considered letting Paterno finish the season with Bradley as team spokesman, but ultimately decided that would still keep the focus on Paterno. The board also did not like that Paterno released statements on his own rather than through the school, with some board members feeling he may have breached his contract. The trustee also noted that he and many of his colleagues felt Paterno either "knew about [the abuse] and swept it under the rug, or he didn't ask enough questions." The board was also angered by Spanier's statements of support for Curley and Schultz. A few months later, chairman Steve Garban and vice chairman John Surma issued a statement saying that the board felt Paterno "could not be expected to continue to effectively perform his duties" in the wake of the scandal.

On March 12, the Board of Trustees released what it described as its final statement on the ouster of Spanier and Paterno, stating that Spanier not only made unauthorized statements to the press, but failed to tell the board all he knew about the 2001 incident. It also said that Paterno demonstrated a "failure of leadership" by not going to the police. The board said it had every intention of sending someone to personally inform Paterno of the decision, but was unable to do so because of a large number of people surrounding his house. Rather than risk having Paterno learn about the decision via the media, the board decided to order him to leave immediately via telephone.

However, in late 2014 and early 2015, court depositions by trustees Kenneth Frazier and Keith Masser conflicted with the "failure of leadership" story. As stated by Masser in his deposition in state senator Jake Corman's lawsuit against the National Collegiate Athletic Association (NCAA), "The decision to remove Coach Paterno had nothing to do with what he had known, what he hadn't done. It was based upon the distraction of having him on the sidelines would have caused the university and the current football team harm. It had nothing to do with what Coach Paterno had done, or hadn't done." Frazier's testimony added that, given what had been reported publicly and in the grand jury presentment, he felt that Coach Paterno leading the football team onto the field would not send the right message. It was his opinion that, although the board needed to be careful to understand all the facts, the decision about relieving Paterno of his coaching duties did not depend on knowing the key facts of Paterno's alleged involvement. Rather, given the seriousness of the matter, Frazier's concern was the public perception of the University's values if Coach Paterno were to remain as coach.

Spanier remained a tenured sociology professor at Penn State, despite being stripped of his duties as president. Likewise, Paterno remained a tenured member of the Penn State faculty, and was treated as having retired. The board was still finalizing Paterno's retirement package at the time of his death from lung cancer two months later, on January 22, 2012. On October 16, 2012, Penn State announced it would not renew Curley's contract when it expired in June 2013.

==== Freeh report ====
On November 21, 2011, Frazier announced that Louis Freeh, former director of the FBI, would lead an internal investigation into Penn State's actions. Freeh announced that the team assisting him in his investigation would include former FBI agents and federal prosecutors. As the Sandusky trial proceeded toward conviction in June 2012, it was reported that "[t]he university says that [Freeh's] report should be out this summer and will be released to the trustees and the public simultaneously without being reviewed by the school's general counsel's office".

The Freeh report was released on July 12, 2012. Freeh concluded that Paterno, Spanier, Curley and Schultz were complicit in "conceal[ing] Sandusky's activities from the Board of Trustees, the University community and authorities." According to Exhibit 2F of the report, Spanier and Schultz felt that approaching Sandusky as a first step was a more "humane" approach. Freeh's press release was critical of all four for not expressing the same feeling toward his victim. The report was also critical of Penn State's general counsel, Cynthia Baldwin. Freeh concluded that Schultz, Spanier, Curley and Paterno "failed to protect against a child sexual predator harming children for over a decade", as well as violated the Clery Act. The report also stated the four men not only made no effort to identify the victim of the 2001 incident, but alerted Sandusky to McQueary's allegations against him, thus potentially putting the victim in more danger.

In addition, the report said that the four men "exhibited a striking lack of empathy for Sandusky's victims by failing to inquire as to their safety and well-being." The report stated that the men knew about the 1998 incident but "empowered Sandusky to attract potential victims to the campus and football events by allowing him to have continued, unrestricted and unsupervised access to the University's facilities and affiliation with the University's prominent football program" while the investigation was underway. The report stated that Paterno was asked in January 2011 by the grand jury about inappropriate sexual conduct with young boys, other than the 2001 incident. He replied, "I do not know of it. ... I don't know. I don't remember." Spanier had granted Sandusky emeritus status, and the perquisites of that status, upon his retirement in 1999, to the dismay of provost Rodney Erickson and vice provost Robert Secor. In emails dated August 31, 1999, Erickson said, "Let's go ahead and grant it [emeritus status], if Graham has already promised it," and Secor wrote, "But we are in a bind. Apparently Graham told [Sandusky] that we would do this, he was wholly within his rights here since the policy says, 'The President may grant (or deny) Emeritus Rank on an exception basis.'" Freeh found no evidence to show that Sandusky's retirement or emeritus rank was related to the events at the Lasch Building. In response, Penn State's trustees announced that they accepted the report's conclusions and would implement corrective measures.

On September 13, 2012, a group of alumni and supporters, under the name of Penn Staters for Responsible Stewardship, released a review of the Freeh report that was critical of their investigation and conclusions. On February 10, 2013, a report commissioned by the Paterno family was released by Richard Thornburgh, former U.S. Attorney General and former governor of Pennsylvania, maintaining that the report was "seriously flawed, both with respect to the process of [its] investigation and its findings related to Mr. Paterno". In response, Freeh called Thornburgh's report "self-serving" and said that it did not change the facts and findings of his initial investigation. On June 23, 2014, at Sandusky's pension forfeiture appeal, hearing arbiter Michael Bangs ruled that his pension be reinstated and criticized the Freeh report, stating it "was based on significant hearsay and was mostly ruled inadmissible (for the proceedings), [but] was admitted in part to show it had found Sandusky had received 71 separate payments from Penn State between 2000 and 2008". Later in a footnote, Bangs states, "The terrifically significant disparity between the finding in the Freeh report and the actual truth is disturbing. While the Freeh report found that Penn State had made 71 separate payments to [Sandusky] between 2000 and 2008, they were off by almost 85 percent, as the correct number was six separate payments". Bangs goes on to say that the error "calls into question the accuracy and veracity of the entire report".

NBC sportscaster Bob Costas said, "What Freeh did was not only gather facts but he reached a conclusion which is at least debatable from those facts and then he assigned a motivation, not only to Curley and Schultz and Spanier, but he specifically assigned a very dark motivation to Joe Paterno, which seems like it might be quite a leap. ... A reasonable person will conclude that there is some doubt here and that the other side of the story deserves to be heard."

In January 2012, sports journalist Sally Jenkins secured an interview with Paterno shortly before his death. During the interview, she asked him his views on the Sandusky sexual molestation allegations. Her report of the interview was published January 13, 2012. In it she drew no firm conclusions about Paterno's culpability, but simply reported his words, and those of his lawyer. On July 12, 2012, in a Washington Post follow-up column, after the release of the Freeh Report, Jenkins wrote: "Joe Paterno was a liar, there's no doubt about that now ... Paterno fell prey to the single most corrosive sin in sports: the belief that winning on the field makes you better and more important than other people."

==== Other actions ====
A building owner removed Sandusky's image from a mural near the university, and the Penn State Creamery renamed an ice cream flavor which had been created in his honor. On top of ousting both Paterno and Spanier, the school also placed McQueary on indefinite paid administrative leave. Steve Garban resigned from the board of trustees after the release of the Freeh report, the first member of the board to do so since the scandal broke. One victim withdrew from Central Mountain High School due to bullying, and the boy's mother has stated that the high school did not do enough to prevent the fallout.

In January 2012, new university president Rodney Erickson traveled for a week to speak with alumni in New York, Pittsburgh, and Philadelphia in an attempt to repair the university's image. At the meetings, Erickson received harsh criticism from alumni over the firing of Joe Paterno, and also received widespread criticism from the media for attempting to shift the focus away from the university.

After the Freeh report's release, local organizations called for the removal of the Joe Paterno statue outside Beaver Stadium. A small plane towed a banner over campus, reading Take the Statue Down or We Will. After some days of mixed messages, the school removed the statue on July 22, in front of a crowd of student onlookers. The statue was reportedly put in storage. Erickson said the statue had become "a source of division and an obstacle to healing" but made a distinction between it and the Paterno Library, also on campus. The $13 million 1997 library expansion, partially funded by a $4 million gift from Paterno and his wife Sue, "remains a tribute to Joe and Sue Paterno's commitment to Penn State's student body and academic success, and it highlights the positive impacts coach Paterno had on the university.... Thus I feel strongly that the library's name should remain unchanged," Erickson said in the statement.

==== Penn State students ====
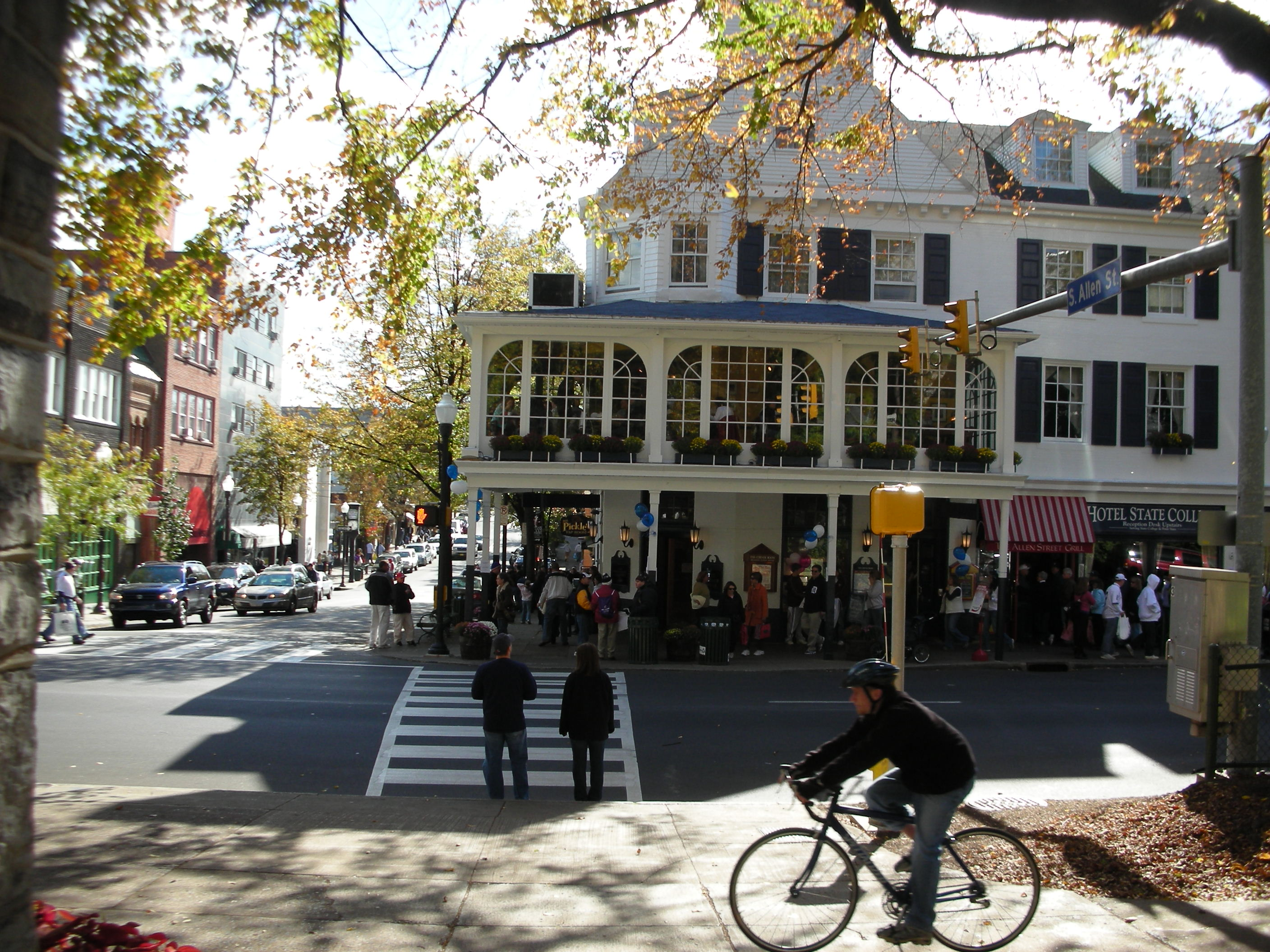
Downtown State College was the location of the November 9–10 student protest.

A few Penn State students, angered over Spanier's role in the 2001 incident as well as his statement of support for Curley and Schultz, created a Facebook page, "Fire Graham Spanier", to call on Penn State's Board of Trustees to fire him. An online petition at change.org calling for Spanier's ouster garnered over 1,700 signatures in four days.

After Paterno's ouster was announced on live television, students and non-students protested near the Penn State campus. Sources estimate 10,000 people protested to support Paterno, with some tipping over a WTAJ news van. Some police officers used a "chemical spray" to disperse the demonstrators. Minor injuries were reported. Approximately $200,000 in damage resulted from the protest. Local police criticized the short notice from Penn State administration and the insufficient time to mobilize officers from other areas as factors exacerbating the situation. About 47 people were charged in connection with the protest, and some were subsequently sentenced to a combination of prison terms, probation, community service, and restitution.

On November 10, a group of Penn State alumni set up and announced ProudPSUforRAINN, a fundraiser for the anti-sexual violence network RAINN with a goal of $500,000, which was exceeded by July 10, 2012. Students also held a candlelight vigil on the lawn of Old Main. The planning for the vigil began the Monday before Paterno's firing and gained steam quickly across campus. It was shown live on news networks across the country, including CNN and ESPN. Former NFL player and sports broadcaster LaVar Arrington, a Penn State alum, spoke at the event which attracted an estimated 10,000.

=== NCAA ===
==== Initial sanctions ====
On November 17, NCAA President Mark Emmert personally wrote Erickson to ask him how Penn State had exercised control over its athletic program in the wake of the scandal. The letter also demanded answers to four specific questions about how Penn State had complied with NCAA policies during that time. Penn State pledged full cooperation, but asked to defer its response until after the release of the Freeh report. On July 16, Emmert appeared on PBS' Tavis Smiley and said that with the release of the Freeh report, Penn State had "weeks, not months" to answer the questions he had raised in the November letter. He also hinted that he had not ruled out issuing the so-called "death penalty", which would have forced Penn State to cancel at least the 2012 season. The NCAA had not handed down a death penalty to a Division I school since Southern Methodist University (SMU) was hit with it in 1987 for massive violations in its football program.

Shortly after the release of the Freeh report, the NCAA Board gave Emmert the power to take corrective and punitive action relative to Penn State, forgoing the NCAA's normal investigative protocol. On July 22, 2012, the NCAA announced that it would impose "corrective and punitive" sanctions against both the Penn State football program and the institution as a whole the next morning. In announcing the sanctions, Emmert said that, although the behavior could be called more egregious than any other seen in NCAA history, and thus a multi-year suspension was appropriate, they concluded that it was as important to drive "cultural change" at Penn State as much as it was to hold it to account. For this reason, Emmert said, the NCAA believed cancelling one or more football seasons was not appropriate, as it would cause "significant unintended harm to many who had nothing to do with this case." He also praised Erickson and newly installed Board of Trustees chairwoman Karen Peetz with taking corrective measures on their own, saying that they "have demonstrated a strong desire and determination on the part of Penn State to take the steps necessary for the university to right these severe wrongs."

On July 23, Emmert announced the following sanctions against Penn State:

- Five years probation.
- A four-year postseason ban.
- Vacating of all wins from 1998 to 2011–112 wins in all. This had the effect of stripping the Nittany Lions of their shared Big Ten titles in 2005 and 2008. It also removed 111 wins from Paterno's record, dropping him from first to 12th on the NCAA's all-time wins list.
- A $60 million fine, the proceeds of which were to go toward an endowment for preventing child abuse. According to the NCAA, this was the equivalent of a typical year's gross revenue from the football program.
- Loss of a total of forty initial scholarships from 2013 to 2017. During the same period, Penn State was to be limited to 65 total scholarships—only two more than a Division I FCS (formerly I-AA) school was allowed.
- Penn State was required to adopt all recommendations for reform delineated in the Freeh report.
- Penn State entered into an "athletics integrity agreement" with the NCAA and Big Ten, appoint a university-wide athletic compliance officer and compliance council, and accepted an NCAA-appointed athletic integrity monitor for the duration of its probation.

The sanctions took the form of a sweeping consent decree in which Penn State accepted the findings of fact by the NCAA and waived any right to appeal the sanctions. A full release was granted to all players in the program, allowing them to transfer to another school without losing eligibility. According to ESPN's Don Van Natta, Jr., the NCAA and Penn State had already begun preliminary discussions about possible sanctions in mid-July. The Patriot-News reported that the NCAA formally forwarded its terms to Penn State's legal team on July 19. Discussions continued over the weekend, and the final agreement was essentially the NCAA's original proposal except for some minor concessions to Penn State. In announcing the sanctions, Emmert said that he intended the Penn State case to be "the cautionary tale of athletics overwhelming core values of the institution and losing sight of why we are really participating in these activities can occur." He also said that the sanctions were necessary to force Penn State to reform its athletic culture.

The Big Ten followed the NCAA actions, concurring with its findings by officially censuring Penn State and levying a separate fine of $13 million. In a statement, the conference stated that its intentions were "not to destroy a great university, but rather to seek justice and constructively assist a member institution with its efforts to reform." The Big Ten financial penalty came as Penn State gave up its four-year share of conference bowl revenue. The $13 million, as with the NCAA fines, will instead be donated to "help victims of child sex abuse".

The NCAA said it was compelled to act outside the normal investigative process due to what it described as the sheer egregiousness of the misconduct detailed in the Freeh report. In the NCAA's view, Spanier, Curley, Schultz and Paterno's cover-up of Sandusky's crimes constituted "a failure of institutional and individual integrity," and thus violated basic principles of intercollegiate athletics that were over and above specific NCAA policies. Additionally, the NCAA said that since Penn State had commissioned the Freeh report and accepted its findings, further proceedings would be redundant. Emmert himself said that Freeh's investigation was far more exhaustive than any that would have been mounted by the NCAA.

Due to the deviation from normal NCAA investigative process as well as the nature of the sanctions, four trustees of the university filed an appeal of the sanctions. Board member Ryan McCombie, a 26-year U.S. Navy veteran who was elected to the board in July 2012 by members of the school's alumni association, led the trustee appeal. A letter filed on the trustees' behalf by Paul Kelly of Jackson Lewis LLP called the sanctions "excessive and unreasonable". The letter also argued that Erickson exceeded his authority in accepting the sanctions. In addition, a group of former Penn State football players, including former starting quarterback Michael Robinson, filed their own appeal. However, a spokesman for the NCAA held that the sanctions were not subject to appeal.

==== Sanctions rescinded ====
The validity of the sanctions later came into question, and emails surfaced that indicated highly ranked officials within the NCAA did not believe the organization had the jurisdiction to pass down the original sanctions. Subsequent emails, brought forward under subpoena, quoted an NCAA vice-president, "I characterized our approach to PSU as a bluff when talking to Mark [Emmert, NCAA president] ... He basically agreed [because] I think he understands that if we made this an enforcement issue, we may win the immediate battle but lose the war." Another vice-president questioned the NCAA's investigation and enforcement process of Penn State, calling it "a bit of a runaway train right now," and wrote that he had concerns regarding the NCAA's jurisdiction to sanction Penn State: "I know we are banking on the fact [Penn State] is so embarrassed they will do anything."

The NCAA later rescinded many of the sanctions against Penn State. On September 24, 2013, the NCAA announced that Penn State's scholarships would be gradually restored until the number of scholarships reached the normal 85 for the 2016–17 year, the first year after Penn State's postseason ban. A year later, on September 8, 2014, the NCAA announced that Penn State would be eligible for the 2014 postseason and all scholarships would be restored in 2015. Several months later, on January 16, 2015, the NCAA reinstated Paterno and Bradley's wins.

==== Debate over suspension of the football program ====
At least two Penn State trustees, as well as several alumni, criticized Erickson for accepting the NCAA sanctions as quickly as he had. However, in a press conference shortly after the penalties were handed down, Erickson said that as harsh as they were, he had no choice but to accept them. According to Erickson, had Penn State not accepted the penalties, the NCAA would have gone in "another direction"—one that would have included the NCAA canceling at least the 2012 season. Erickson said that under the circumstances, "we had our backs to the wall," and he had no choice but to accept the consent decree since it was the only deal on offer. Erickson subsequently told ESPN's John Barr that Penn State was facing as long as a four-year ban from play had it not agreed to the sanctions that were ultimately imposed.

Erickson went further on July 25, saying that Emmert had personally told him on July 17—the day after Emmert's interview with Smiley—that a majority of the NCAA leadership wanted to shut down Penn State football for four years. He also said that Penn State could have faced a host of other severe penalties, including a fine several times greater than the $60 million ultimately imposed. When Erickson learned this, he immediately started talks with the NCAA, and was able to get the death penalty taken off the table. Erickson discussed his actions with the board later that night, and the Board resolved that Erickson's actions were understandable under the circumstances.

Emmert and the NCAA Executive Committee's chairman, Oregon State president Edward John Ray, subsequently acknowledged that the NCAA had seriously considered imposing a death penalty, but denied that Penn State had been threatened with one had it not accepted the consent decree. Ray, whose committee was charged by Emmert with designing the sanctions, told ESPN's Adam Rittenberg that while there was considerable debate about whether to include a death penalty among the sanctions, "the overwhelming position of members of both the executive committee and the Division I board was to not include suspension of play." He also "categorically" denied that the NCAA had threatened Penn State with a death penalty had it not accepted the sanctions, and added that using it as a backup in case of such a rejection was "never even a point of discussion within either the executive committee or the Division I board."

Emmert himself told ESPN's Bob Ley that the death penalty was "unequivocally on the table" as one of the possible sanctions. However, he said, Penn State's swift corrective measures after the scandal broke out in full—including forcing out Spanier and Paterno—were significant factors in ultimately taking the death penalty off the table. "Had Penn State not been as decisive as they were," Emmert said, "I don't know what the outcome would have been, but I suspect it would have been significantly worse." Emmert also repeated Ray's denial that Penn State had been threatened with a multi-year suspension had it not agreed to the penalties, saying there had been "some confusion" about those circumstances. He did say, however, that if Erickson and Penn State had not signed the consent decree, the NCAA would have launched a full-blown infractions investigation that would have had "an unknown outcome."

In the consent decree itself, the NCAA acknowledged that there had been some discussion about imposing a "death penalty," but noted that this severe penalty was primarily reserved for repeat violators who neither cooperated with the NCAA nor took any corrective measures once the violations came to light. However, it not only noted Penn State's swift corrective action, but also pointed out the school had never been the subject of a major infractions case before. This stood in contrast to the situation at SMU 25 years earlier; school officials at SMU knew major violations were occurring and did nothing to stop them, and the school had been under nearly constant scrutiny from the NCAA for over a decade.

== Civil lawsuits and subsequent developments ==
On November 28, 2011, Fisher and his mother hired attorneys to pursue civil claims against both parties. On November 30, the first lawsuit by a victim of sexual abuse was filed against Penn State and Sandusky alleging over 100 incidents of sexual abuse; the victim was identified in the suit only as "John Doe A." A man claiming to be the previously unknown victim of the shower incident ("Victim 2") stepped forward through his lawyers in July 2012 and stated his intentions to file a lawsuit against Penn State. His lawyers, Ross Feller Casey LLP, also released a pair of voicemails from September 2011 that were purportedly left for the firm's client by Sandusky.

On September 20, 2012, Penn State released an announcement that the institution had hired the law firm of Feinberg Rozen LLP to assist in the handling of any personal injury lawsuits that could emerge as a result of the sexual abuse allegations that had been made against Sandusky. Erickson stated that Penn State's ultimate goal was to settle any civil cases in a way that would not force the victims to go through the legal process once again.

On October 2, McQueary sued Penn State in Centre County Court for a total of $8 million – demanding $4 million for alleged defamation due to Spanier's public statement of support for Curley and Schultz, and another $4 million for alleged misrepresentation after Schultz stated he would take appropriate action after the shower room incident McQueary witnessed. The suit alleges that McQueary was fired because he had cooperated with law enforcement and would serve as a witness in the trial of Schultz and Curley. McQueary was also seeking reinstatement of his job or compensation for lost wages.

On January 1, 2013, Governor Tom Corbett announced he would sue the NCAA in federal court over the sanctions imposed on Penn State. Although Corbett is an ex officio member of the board of trustees, Penn State was not involved in the suit. According to the AP, Corbett was filing an antitrust suit against the NCAA. Though he had originally "endorsed [the NCAA settlement in the immediate wake of the Freeh report] as 'part of the corrective process'", Corbett and other state lawmakers had recently begun to object to the prospect of the $60 million fine being spent mostly outside of Pennsylvania. One reason given for the objection is that there was no legal way Penn State could ensure that taxpayer money would not be used to pay the fine.

In sharply criticizing the governor's move in an editorial, The New York Times noted that Corbett "barely mentioned the young victims" in his statement. It continued: "In his complaints, the governor only confirmed the inquiry finding that the university's obsession with football predominance helped drive the cover-up of Mr. Sandusky's crimes." It also noted that, in the suit, Corbett "bypassed incoming state attorney general Kathleen Kane [who] in her election campaign last year ... promised to look into why it took so long for the pedophilia scandal to be investigated when Mr. Corbett previously served as attorney general". The Patriot-News said of the suit: "[It] comes after a year of withering criticism of Corbett by some quarters of the Penn State community, which has seen the governor and his fellow PSU trustees as too quick to brand former head coach Joe Paterno and others as fall guys for the Jerry Sandusky child sex abuse scandal." On June 6, 2013, federal Middle District Judge Yvette Kane said she could not "find any factual allegations" and threw out the lawsuit calling, it "a Hail Mary pass" that easily warranted dismissal.

Matthew Sandusky, the adopted son of Jerry Sandusky, was also involved in lawsuits against Penn State. While Matthew originally took his adopted father's side when he was first questioned by the grand jury, he later revealed that Sandusky had started to sexually abuse him when he was 8 years old. Ross Feller Casey LLP went on to represent him in the civil lawsuit, and Matthew reached a settlement with Penn State. He was one of the 26 victims involved in the settlement amount that was reached in October 2013.

On August 16, 2013, a man known as Victim 5, who was sexually abused by Sandusky, was the first to settle his civil suit against Penn State for an undisclosed amount. On October 28, Penn State reached settlements with 26 Sandusky victims, costing the university a total of $59.7 million.

Victim 6 filed a lawsuit against Penn State on January 22, 2013. However, the lawsuit was dismissed on November 6. A U.S. District Judge in Philadelphia ruled in favor of Penn State, stating that the university could not legally be held liable for Sandusky's actions simply because he was employed there. The judge stated that Victim 6 failed "to explain how molestation was the kind of act that Penn State employed Sandusky to perform." On November 21, Victim 9 sued Penn State, citing that the male victim had been unable to reach a settlement with the institution. Stephen E. Raynes of Raynes McCarty released a statement that he and his team had been working closely with Michael Rozen to reach a settlement for Victim 9. Because of Penn State's refusal to compensate his client, they filed a civil lawsuit in an attempt to "compel Penn State to finally fulfill its responsibilities to this young man."

On April 9, 2015, Penn State trustees voted to approve a settlement with "one or more" victims from the Sandusky scandal. While both the victims involved and the amount of the settlement remained confidential, another step was taken to provide justice to those who had suffered at the hands of Sandusky. As of November 27, 2015, the total amount that Penn State owed victims of Sandusky was close to $93 million. An audit of Penn State's financial statements for the 2015 financial year (ending June 30) revealed that the university had made new payments totaling $33.2 million that were all related to Sandusky. The audit also indicated that Penn State had already paid or agreed to pay 32 claims relevant to Sandusky.

=== Pennsylvania Manufacturers' Association Insurance ===
In February 2012, Pennsylvania Manufacturers' Association Capital Insurance Company (PMACIC), Penn State's liability insurer, asked the Philadelphia Court of Common Pleas to limit its exposure from a lawsuit filed by an alleged victim of Sandusky due to both the time of coverage of the policies and possible "intentional conduct" of the university. PMA Capital Insurance Co. should not be confused with the Pennsylvania Manufacturers Association, which had a business relationship with Penn State dating back to the 1950s. The Association sold its insurance business to PMA Capital Insurance Company of Blue Bell, PA in 2004. PMA Capital Insurance Co, was sued by the university in February 2013 after the company refused to cover claims from thirty men alleging abuse by Sandusky. As part of the litigation, PMACIC brought in a lawyer with expertise in sex abuse cases to examine how Penn State vetted claims before paying alleged victims. Noting a surprising lack of documentation, the lawyer wrote, "It appears as though Penn State made little effort, if any, to verify the credibility of the claims."

Penn Live reported that a court order connected to the PMACIC case stated that Paterno was allegedly told in 1976 about an accusation of sexual abuse by Sandusky. PMA documents alleged that a boy told Paterno he had been molested by Sandusky, who was then an assistant coach. The order also cited reports by unnamed assistant coaches who said they witnessed inappropriate contact between Sandusky and some children, according to the ruling by Philadelphia Judge Gary Glazer. Penn State spokesman Lawrence Lokman said university officials involved in cases related to the Sandusky scandal were aware of the new allegations contained in the insurance case broadly; Lokman said to Penn Live: "Many, many people, potential victims and victims have come forward to the university as part of that (settlement) process... We do not talk about their specific circumstances." CNN reported one of the victims, identified as Victim A, had told Paterno about an incident in a bathroom as early as 1971.

NBC also reported that one former Penn State assistant coach witnessed an incident in the late 1970s, and three other coaches—who have gone on to work in pro level and other colleges—allegedly saw inappropriate conduct between Sandusky and young boys in the 1990s. Risk management expert Raymond Williams identified three incidents with some of the assistant coaches on the Penn State staff at the time, and three others that were reported to university officials; and whether the key officials should have had knowledge about child sex-assault allegations involving Sandusky in each of the six different cases dating to 1976. McQueary alleged former Penn State assistant coaches Greg Schiano and Tom Bradley knew about earlier transgressions by Sandusky. In a deposition related to the PMA case, McQueary claimed that upon telling Bradley what he had seen, Bradley was not shocked and related a story about a time in the 1990s when Schiano had witnessed Sandusky doing something with a boy. Bradley and Schiano denied the allegations.

Paterno family members dismissed the accusations. Paterno's wife Sue said in a letter to the Board of Trustees: "It is time to end this endless process of character assassination by accusation" and asked board members to seek the truth "in the spirit of our love for Penn State and our duty to the victims." Paterno's son Scott called the new claims "bunk," and expressed on Twitter "it would be great if everyone waited to see the substance of the allegation before they assume it's true. Because it's not." Michael Boni, a plaintiff's lawyer in the Sandusky scandal, claimed "the headlines of these stories is Paterno knew of Sandusky's molestation in the '70s, '76 or '77. I'm unaware of direct, irrefutable evidence that that's the case... believe me, I'm the last person to defend the guy, but I am the first person to believe in our justice system. And I think you need more than anecdotal evidence or speculative evidence."

Penn State president Eric Barron said the accusations were "unsubstantiated and unsupported by any evidence other than a claim by an alleged victim", and claimed the university is being subjected unfairly to "rumor, innuendo and rush to judgment". Barron acknowledged the school's board had spent tens of millions of dollars without making an effort to corroborate claims. "None of these allegations ... has been substantiated in a court of law or in any other process to test their veracity," Barron wrote. The university hired settlement experts Kenneth Feinberg and Michael Rozen to handle the claims.

The settlement agreements required victims to release several organizations, and anyone connected to them, from lawsuits, including The Second Mile. An Indianapolis attorney who represents sex abuse victims said, "That's not normal. Why would Penn State care about The Second Mile?" and that he had never encountered a defendant requesting a liability release for a separate organization. Penn State alumni trustee Al Lord said, "There's only one reason [for the release], and that was to protect ... members of the board who were involved at the Second Mile." The trustee who chaired the board committee that oversaw negotiations was Ira Lubert, a friend of a former Second Mile board chair as well as part-owner of a summer camp The Second Mile visited. Nicholas Mirkay, a University of Hawaii law school professor and nonprofit governance expert, found it surprising Penn State leadership allowed a board member with even a tangential connection to the Second Mile to lead settlement negotiations.

=== McQueary vs. Penn State ===
In October 2016, a jury found that Penn State had defamed McQueary, and awarded him $7 million in damages. Penn State appealed the ruling in November 2016, and the case judge also awarded an additional almost $5 million to McQueary based on a separate charge that his firing was retaliation for whistleblowing. McQueary eventually settled the case for an undisclosed amount before the appeal was heard.

=== Fines for Clery Act Violations ===
In November 2016, the U.S. Department of Education announced that it sought to fine Penn State nearly $2.4 million for violating the Clery Act. The violations include failing to alert the public about Sandusky's conduct and other campus dangers. Penn State officials have said that they will not appeal the fine.

Findings:

- Finding #1: Clery Act violations related to the Sandusky matter (proposed fine: $27,500).
- Finding #2: Lack of administrative capability as a result of the University's substantial failures to comply with the Clery Act and the Drug-Free Schools and Communities Act throughout the review period, including insufficient training, support, and resources to ensure compliance (proposed fine: $27,500).
- Finding #3: Omitted and/or inadequate annual security report and annual fire safety report policy statements (proposed fine: $37,500).
- Finding #4: Failure to issue timely warnings in accordance with federal regulations.
- Finding #5: Failure to properly classify reported incidents and disclose crime statistics from 2008–2011 (proposed fine: $2,167,500).
- Finding #6: Failure to establish an adequate system for collecting crime statistics from all required sources (proposed fine: $27,500).
- Finding #7: Failure to maintain an accurate and complete daily crime log.
- Finding #8: Reporting discrepancies in crime statistics published in the annual security report and those reported to the department's campus crime statistics database (proposed fine: $27,500).
- Finding #9: Failure to publish and distribute an annual security report in accordance with federal regulations (proposed fine: $27,500).
- Finding #10: Failure to notify prospective students and employees of the availability of the annual security report and annual fire safety report (proposed fine: $27,500).
- Finding #11: Failure to comply with the Drug-Free Schools and Communities Act (proposed fine: $27,500).

== Impact ==
At the time of the NCAA sanctions, one columnist had characterized them (scholarship restrictions, a bowl ban, loss of revenue) as a fate "worse than death" for the Penn State football program – noncompetitiveness on the field. In addition to the expected damage to future recruiting from those sanctions, the NCAA had enacted a temporary exception to transfer rules which allowed current scholarship players to leave the tainted program.

Only one high profile player left State College, and the football program did not experience a losing season between Paterno's firing and the first post-sanction bowl game. The football team posted winning records of 9–4 in 2011, 8–4 in 2012, 7–5 in 2013, and 7–6 in 2014. In 2015 the arrival of running back Saquon Barkley heralded 11 win seasons in 2016 and 2017.

Penn State's Aa1 revenue-bond rating was "placed on review for possible downgrade" by Moody's Investors Service because of the scandal's possible effects on the university's finances. After the school was removed from the watchlist in February 2012 and assigned a "negative outlook" within that rating class due to its "ongoing uncertainty", Moody's again considered downgrading the bond rating the following July. In October 2012, Moody's downgraded Penn State's bond rating to Aa2 citing "anticipation of the substantial financial impact on the university from the ultimate cost of future settlements and possible judgments". It would not be until February 2016 that Penn State would see its rating restored to Aa1, with Moody's citing a stable outlook and the university's ability to continue operating despite Pennsylvania's delay in enacting 2016 appropriations.

State Farm Insurance pulled its sponsorship of the Nittany Lions football team in July 2012, and asked the United States District Court for the Middle District of Pennsylvania to declare that there is no provision in its policy with Penn State to force the company to help pay for Sandusky's criminal defense bills or any punitive damages that he has incurred.

Penn State reported that the school had spent $3.2 million on investigations, public relations, and legal advice in response to the scandal through the middle of February 2012.

On August 15, 2012, Penn State's regional accreditation was put on "warning" status due to the Sandusky scandal. The Middle States Commission on Higher Education, which accredits the university, continued to accredit Penn State but demanded a report addressing these. In November, the warning status was lifted as the accreditor was "impressed by the degree to which Penn State has risen, as a strong campus community, to recognize and respond to the sad events."

== See also ==
=== Film ===
- Paterno, a 2018 film about the Penn State case

=== Similar cases ===
- Baylor University sexual assault scandal involving football players
- Ohio State University abuse scandal involving 177 students and athletes
- United Kingdom football sexual abuse scandal involving British soccer teams
- USA Gymnastics sex abuse scandal associated with Michigan State University and involving over 265 female gymnasts
- Child abuse in association football
