= Sue Paterno =

American philanthropist

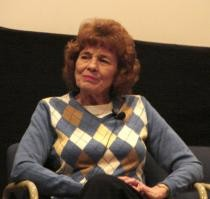
- Sue Paterno speaking at Penn State in 2008
- Born: Suzanne Pohland; February 14, 1940 (age 86); Latrobe, Pennsylvania, U.S.
- Education: Penn State University B.A.
- Spouse: Joe Paterno (m. 1962; died 2012)
- Children: 5
- Website: Paterno Family Home Page

Suzanne Pohland Paterno (/pəˈtɜːrnoʊ/; born February 14, 1940), sometimes referred to as "SuePa", is an American philanthropist. She is the widow of football coach Joe Paterno, who led the Penn State Nittany Lions from 1966 to 2011.

== Early life and education ==
Suzanne Pohland was born on February 14, 1940, in Latrobe, Pennsylvania. She studied English literature at Penn State University, where she met then-assistant coach Joe Paterno. Shortly after her graduation in 1962, Joe and Sue were married. She taught at a local school in Centre County, Pennsylvania, for a year before leaving to give birth to her first child.

Joe and Sue had 5 children together, including Jay.

== Philanthropy ==
Together, Joe and Sue Paterno donated millions of dollars to Penn State and to other charities, most notably, the Special Olympics.

In 2010, Sue Paterno led the charge to build a Catholic student faith center on the Penn State University Park campus. The Suzanne Pohland Paterno Catholic Student Faith Center opened in 2012.
