= Rodney Erickson =

American academic administrator

Rodney A. Erickson

17th President of the Pennsylvania State University
- In office November 17, 2011 – May 12, 2014; Interim; November 9, 2011 – November 17, 2011
- Preceded by: Graham Spanier
- Succeeded by: Eric J. Barron

Personal details
- Born: 1946 (age 78–79) Frederic, Wisconsin, US
- Education: University of Minnesota (BS, MS); University of Washington (PhD)
- Profession: Academic administrator

Rodney Allen Erickson (born 1946) is an American academic administrator who served as the 17th president of Pennsylvania State University from 2011 to 2014. Formerly executive vice president and provost (chief academic officer), he was named interim president of Penn State on November 9, 2011, after previous president Graham Spanier was forced to resign in the wake of the Penn State sex abuse scandal, after which the "interim" tag was removed later that month. The Food Science Building at Penn State, which houses the Berkey Creamery, is named after Erickson.

== Education and career ==
Erickson graduated from the University of Minnesota, where he also earned his master's degree. He earned a Ph.D. in geography from the University of Washington in 1973. After a brief tenure at the University of Wisconsin-Madison, he came to Penn State as an assistant professor of geography and business administration. He was promoted to full professor in 1984. He has been part of the Penn State administration since 1995, when he was promoted to dean of the graduate school; in 1997 he was named vice president for research. He was promoted to provost and executive vice president in July 1999.

When Erickson became interim president, initial plans called for him to stay on only until a permanent successor could be found. However, on November 17, 2011, the Board of Trustees removed the "interim" tag from Erickson's title and formally named him as Penn State's president. It is very unusual for American universities, especially major research universities like Penn State, to promote someone to the presidency from within. However, several trustees felt that given the gravity of the sex abuse scandal, Erickson would provide a measure of stability. Additionally, University of Virginia economist David Breneman believed it unlikely "anybody worth getting" would even consider the post if Penn State mounted a national search. Terry Hartles of the American Council of Education believed that the move was necessary as the institution needed "stable, effective leadership" and not a year-long search for a successor. Erickson received support from trustees of the university, who complimented his knowledge of academic administration and openness.

On January 10, 2012, Erickson announced that he would retire in June 2014 at the latest. A search for a successor ensued and on February 17, 2014, Eric J. Barron was announced as Penn State's next president. Erickson's last official duty as university president was presiding over the class of 2014 commencement, after which Barron assumed office as scheduled following Erickson's departure on May 12, 2014.
