= Maxwell Football Club =

American football club in Pennsylvania

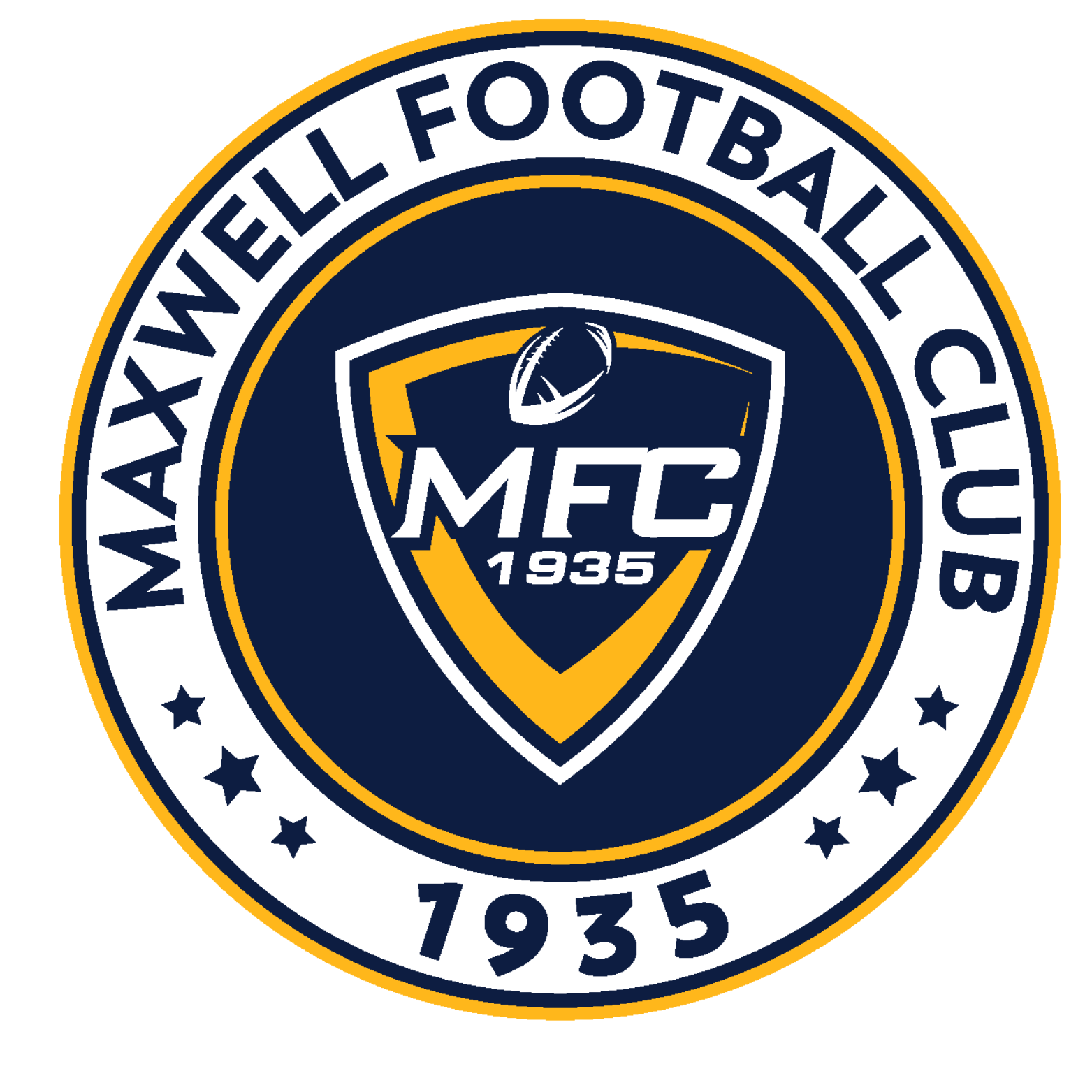
- Founder: Bert Bell
- Founded: December 21, 1935 (89 years); Philadelphia, PA
- Legal status: 501(c)3
- Headquarters: Ambler, Pennsylvania
- Membership: 600 (2024) (general members, coaches, sports information directors, and media members)
- Key Senior Staff: Mark Wolpert (executive director, vice president & chief operations officer); Mark Dianno (president and CEO); Shawn Wooden (chairman of the board); Rich Cirminiello (VP of college awards); Erik Schada (director of operations & secretary of the board); Hunter G. Dworsky (director of strategic partnerships & special assistant to the director); Collin Sutrick (director of special projects); Dom Amoroso (director of analytics); Maria Trivelpiece (digital media director)

The Robert W. Maxwell Football Club (originally called the Maxwell Football Club of Philadelphia) was established in 1935 to promote safety in the game of American football. Named in honor of Robert W. "Tiny" Maxwell, legendary college player, official, and sports columnist, the club was founded by his friend Bert Bell, then owner of the Philadelphia Eagles professional football team and later commissioner of the National Football League (NFL) along with Edwin Pollock. The awards are presented during the National Awards Gala in the spring of the following year at the College Football Hall of Fame in Atlanta, Georgia. The Maxwell Football Club is one of the oldest currently active.

As of 2017, the club's president is Mark Dianno, and the club's chairman is former NFL defensive back Shawn Wooden. The club's headquarters are located in Ambler, Pennsylvania.

In 2023, the club's longtime executive director, Mark Wolpert, announced that after 86 years, the annual awards gala would move from the Tri-State area (Delaware, New Jersey, Pennsylvania) to the College Football Hall of Fame in Atlanta, Georgia.

== Awards ==
The club presents several awards annually to professional, college, and high-school football players, coaches, and others, including:

- Maxwell Award for College Player of the Year, first awarded in 1937
- Chuck Bednarik Award for College Defensive Player of the Year, instituted in 1995
- Shaun Alexander Freshman of the Year Award for the top freshman in college football, introduced in 2018
- George Munger Award for College Coach of the Year, introduced in 1989
- Bert Bell Award for Professional Player of the Year, established following Bell's death in 1959
- Greasy Neale Award for Professional Coach of the Year, introduced in 1989
- Brian Westbrook first presented in 2001. Tri-State Collegiate Player of the Year
- Tri-State Mini Max Awards
  - New Jersey High School Player of the Year
  - Pennsylvania High School Player of the Year
  - Delaware High School Player of the Year.
- National High School Player Award, presented to the best high school football player in the United States, first awarded in 2007
- National Girls Flag HS Player of the Year Award, presented to the best high school girls flag football player in the United States, first awarded in 2024
- Jim Henry Award for Regional High-School Student-Athlete Football Player of the Year, instituted in 1986
- Andy Talley Tri-State Coach of the Year Award, established in 1998
- Buddy Teevens Award, presented to an individual who has shown innovation in coaching, established in 2024
- MFC Legends Award, established in 2003
- The Thomas Brookshier Spirit Award
- Reds Bagnell Award for Contributions to the Game of Football, introduced in 1989
- HBCU Contributions to Football Award, introduced in 2024

== Former awards ==
- Al Lucas Award for Arena Football League Player of the Year (introduced in 2004, discontinued in 2007)
- Joseph V. Paterno Award (introduced in 2010 as a replacement for the George Munger Award, discontinued in 2011)

== See also ==
- National College Football Awards Association
- Kansas City Committee of 101 Awards
- Washington D.C. Touchdown Club
- Touchdown Club of Columbus
