= Pete DeCoursey =

American journalist (1961–2014)

Peter L. DeCoursey
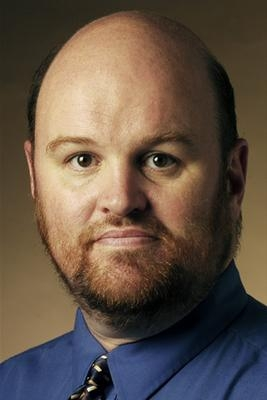
- Born: September 1, 1961; Philadelphia, Pennsylvania, U.S.
- Died: January 1, 2014 (aged 52); Philadelphia, Pennsylvania, U.S.
- Education: William Penn Charter School; Yale University (1984)
- Occupation: Journalist
- Notable credit: Capitolwire
- Spouse(s): Diana Fishlock (divorced); 2 children

Peter L. DeCoursey (September 1, 1961 – January 1, 2014) was an American news reporter of political topics in Pennsylvania. He worked in or covered Pennsylvania politics for nearly three decades, serving most recently as bureau chief for the online news service Capitolwire.com.

== Early life and education ==
DeCoursey was born in Philadelphia, Pennsylvania, attended William Penn Charter School, and graduated from Yale College in 1984 with a bachelor's degree in English language and literature.

== Career ==
DeCoursey started his professional career as an aide to former Philadelphia City Councilwoman Ann Land. He then worked as press secretary for U.S. Rep. Bob Borski, from late 1987 until late 1990. He first became a full-time reporter for the Reading Eagle-Times in August 1990. He worked as a political reporter and columnist for The Patriot-News in Harrisburg, Pennsylvania from March 1997 to 2005 before being hired by GovNetPA to produce original news content for Capitolwire.com, where he became bureau chief.

Mark Bernstein, a lifelong friend, recalled DeCoursey's explanation for becoming a journalist after being a political insider: "He said being a press secretary was all about not saying everything you know. And he wanted to switch to something where he could tell everything he knew, rather than spinning it as a press secretary would."

DeCoursey was first to report on the 2011 proposal by Pennsylvania Senate Majority Leader Dominic Pileggi (R), with the support of Gov. Tom Corbett, to change Pennsylvania from a winner-take-all electoral vote system, to a system that awards electoral votes by congressional district. De Coursey appeared on Public Radio International's Whad'Ya Know? in 2005 and CNN's Capital Gang in 2004. He appeared on Inside Politics on CNN in October 2004.

== Reputation ==
In 2005, he was named one of "Pennsylvania's Most Influential Reporters" by the Pennsylvania political news website PoliticsPA. In 2008, the political website PolitickerPA.com named him one of the "Most Powerful Political Reporters" in Pennsylvania. The Pennsylvania Report named him to the 2009 "The Pennsylvania Report 100" list of influential figures in Pennsylvania politics and noted that his Capitolwire briefing was a "must read for all legislators, staff members, and lobbyists in the state capital", even if it was controversial due to DeCoursey's "attack dog reputation and his sometimes one-sided comments." He was named to the PoliticsPA list of "Sy Snyder's Power 50" list of influential individuals in Pennsylvania politics in 2002.

== Controversy ==
During the 2000 presidential election, Pennsylvania Governor Tom Ridge was known to be under consideration as the running mate for Republican George W. Bush. DeCoursey and fellow journalist Albert J. Neri began planning a book about Ridge and contracted with an agent to pursue a book deal in the event that he was selected.

After Ridge withdrew his name from consideration, both Neri and DeCoursey wrote columns blasting Ridge for pretending to be a candidate after he had withdrawn his name from consideration three weeks before announcing it. Both contrasted that behavior with Ridge's general reputation for honesty. Tim Reeves, Ridge's press secretary said that the situation was a "journalistic conflict of interest." Veteran Philadelphia Inquirer editor and journalism professor at Pennsylvania State University Gene Foreman agreed, noting that the book deal was not disclosed and that the two columns seemed "particularly personal" and contained "pretty extraordinary" language. In return, the editors of both newspapers that had carried the columns noted that they were aware of the book project and the Patriot-News consulted with Bob Steele of The Poynter Institute, who said there was no reason to disclose the potential book to readers. The incident was covered in the American Journalism Review.

In 2003, an article in the Lancaster Sunday News reported on a rumor that DeCoursey and Charlie Thompson, both then reporters for the Patriot-News, were operating the political website PoliticsPA under a pseudonym. DeCoursey and Thompson both denied any involvement in the site, and reporter Helen Adams later wrote a correction.

== Personal life ==
DeCoursey married and was later divorced from his former Patriot-News colleague Diana Fishlock; they had two children. As a hobby, DeCoursey led a group of volunteers who performed statistical analysis of Philadelphia Phillies games for the company STATS, Inc. in an early form of what is now called sabermetrics. He also edited a fan newsletter called the Philadelphia Baseball Philes and worked painstakingly to develop a new statistic to better measure and compare the defensive performance of baseball players.

== Death ==
DeCoursey died on January 1, 2014, at his parents' home in Philadelphia after battling pancreatic and lung cancer. His final column for Capitolwire.com was published the week of his death.
