= Charlie Thompson (reporter) =

- Occupation: Journalist
- Notable credit: The Patriot-News

Charlie Thompson is a prominent journalist in Pennsylvania, working for The Patriot-News.

In 2003, an article in the Lancaster Sunday News reported on a rumour that Thompson and Pete DeCoursey, both then reporters for the Patriot-News, were operating the political website PoliticsPA under a pseudonym.

PoliticsPA named him the "Best Capitol Correspondent," praising "his balanced, unbiased reporting." In 2008, the political website PolitickerPA.com named him one of the "Most Powerful Political Reporters" in Pennsylvania. In 2009, he and Jan Murphy shared an "Honorable Mention" Keystone Press Award in Spot News Reporting from the Pennsylvania Newspaper Association for their "Bonus Busts" coverage of the "Bonusgate" arrests.
