= 2006 Pennsylvania gubernatorial election =

- November 7, 2006
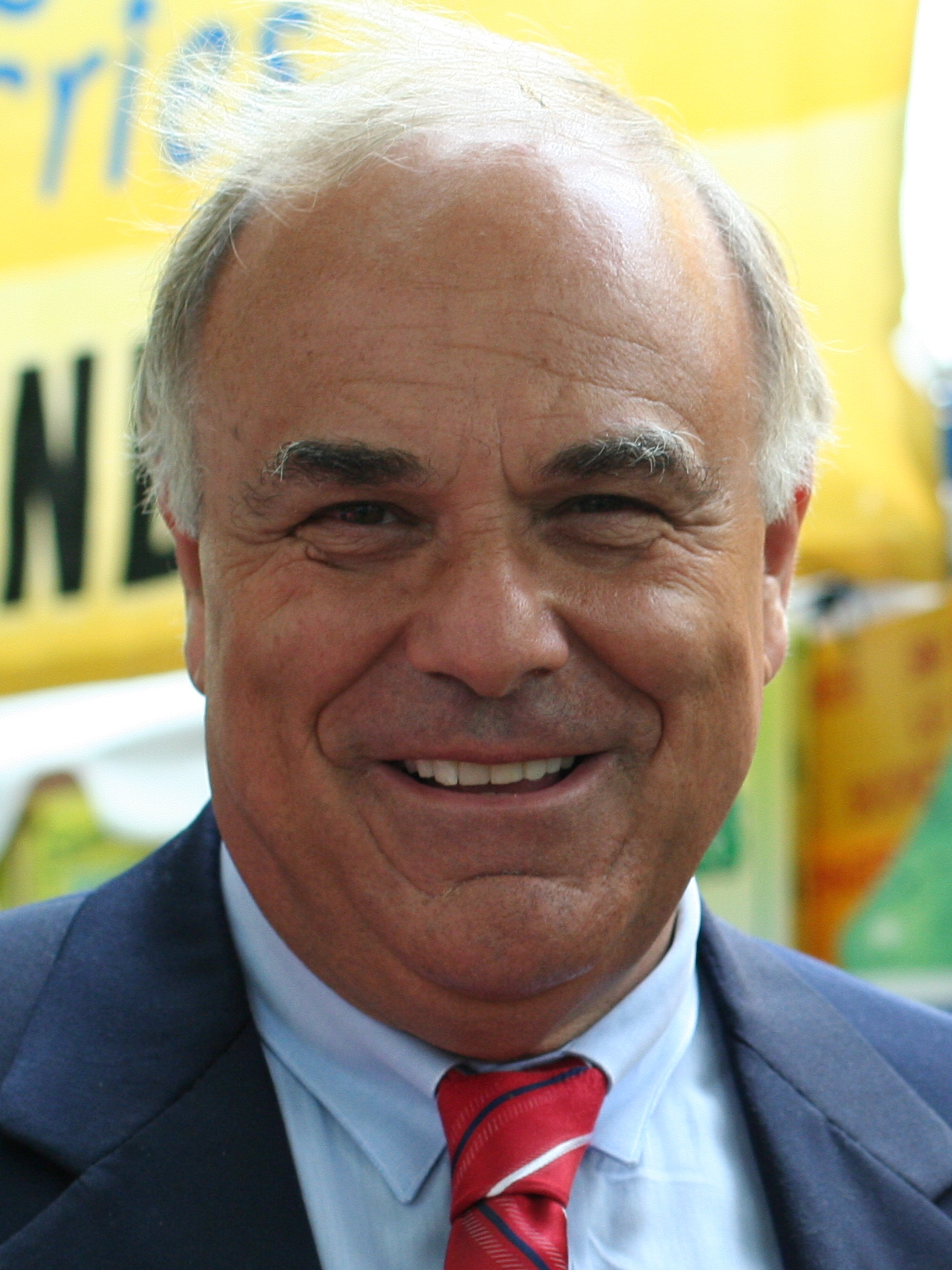

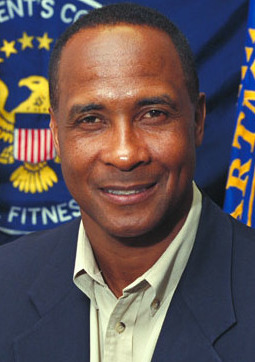
Nominee	Ed Rendell	Lynn Swann
Party	Democratic	Republican
Running mate	Catherine Baker Knoll	Jim Matthews
Popular vote	2,470,517	1,622,135
Percentage	60.36%	39.64%
- Rendell: 50–60% 60–70% 70–80% 80–90% >90% Swann: 50–60% 60–70% 70–80% 80–90% >90% Tie: 50% No data
Governor before election
Ed Rendell
Democratic
Elected Governor
Ed Rendell
Democratic

The 2006 Pennsylvania gubernatorial election was held on November 7, 2006, and included the races for the governor of Pennsylvania and lieutenant governor of Pennsylvania. Incumbent Democratic Governor Ed Rendell successfully ran for re-election. Pennsylvania's first female lieutenant governor, Catherine Baker Knoll, was also running for re-election.

As of 2025, this is the most recent gubernatorial election in which the Democratic candidate has carried the following counties: Clearfield, Columbia, Elk, Mercer, Pike, Susquehanna, Warren, Wayne and Wyoming. This is the last time any statewide race in Pennsylvania resulted in a candidate getting over 60% of the vote, until Governor Josh Shapiro's re-election in 2026.

== Background ==
Rendell and Knoll had the advantage of incumbency, important in the swing state of Pennsylvania. Rendell's approval rating as of May 2006 was 62%.

In the 2000 Presidential election, then-Vice President Al Gore won the state 50.6%-46.4% over then-Texas Governor George W. Bush. In 2004, Senator John Kerry carried the state 50.9%-48.4% over incumbent President Bush.

Although the state had voted Democratic in eight of the past 12 presidential elections, its Congressional delegation had been majority Republican for years. The counties of Philadelphia and Allegheny were the Democratic strongholds, while the central part of the state was where the Republican Party fared best. The 2005 statewide party registration had Democrats out-numbering Republicans in the state with 3,841,429 to 3,292,656, with 939,252 registered independent voters.

== Democratic primary ==
Michael Morrill, the Green Party's nominee for governor in 2002, considered challenging Rendell on a progressive liberal platform. However, on February 13, 2006, Morrill stated that he would not run, citing the toll his 2002 race had taken on his family. Rendell thus ran unopposed.

=== Results ===
Democratic primary results
Party	Candidate	Votes	%
Democratic	Ed Rendell (incumbent)	Unopposed	
Total votes		654,985	100.00

== Republican primary ==
=== Candidates ===
==== Declared ====
- Lynn Swann, Pittsburgh Steelers Hall of Fame wide receiver and chairman of the President's Council on Physical Fitness and Sports

==== Withdrew ====
- Jim Panyard, former president of the Pennsylvania Manufacturers Association
- Jeff Piccola, majority whip of the Pennsylvania State Senate from Susquehanna Township
- William Scranton III, former lieutenant governor and the 1986 nominee

==== Declined ====
- Bruce Castor, district attorney of Montgomery County and candidate for attorney general in 2004
- Jane Earll, state senator from Erie County and nominee for lieutenant governor in 2002
- Melissa Hart, U.S. representative from Pittsburgh (ran for re-election)
- Rick Santorum, U.S. senator (ran for re-election)
- Mark Schweiker, former governor
- Pat Toomey, former U.S. representative from Allentown and candidate for U.S. Senate in 2004

=== Campaign ===
Lynn Swann, Jeff Piccola, Jim Panyard and Bill Scranton III all announced their intention to run in the Republican primary for governor in 2006. Scranton, who served two terms as lieutenant governor of Pennsylvania, was the son of popular former governor William Scranton, and a member of the wealthy Scranton family, was the early front-runner. However, a series of blunders by his campaign, and a lack of momentum from the Piccola and Panyard campaigns, moved Swann into presumptive nominee status. The state Republican party then endorsed Swann, leading the three other candidates to drop out ahead of the March deadline to file for the primary.

=== Results ===
Republican primary results
Party	Candidate	Votes	%
Republican	Lynn Swann	Unopposed	
Total votes		583,658	100.00

== General election ==
=== Candidates ===
- Ed Rendell, incumbent governor of Pennsylvania (Democratic)
- Lynn Swann, former Pittsburgh Steelers Hall of Fame wide receiver and chairman of the President's Council on Physical Fitness and Sports (Republican)
  - Running mate: Jim Matthews, Montgomery County commissioner and brother of Chris Matthews

==== Withdrew ====
- Marakay Rogers, attorney and 2004 attorney general nominee (Green)

==== Failed to submit signatures ====
- Russ Diamond, 2005 General Assembly pay raise whistleblower (Independent)
  - Running mate: Tom Lingenfelter, former Republican state committeeman and perennial candidate
- Hagan Smith, building contractor and chair of Butler County Constitution Party (Constitution)

Four candidates were campaigning for governor, but only two went on to appear on the ballot in November. Constitution candidate Hagan Smith and Independent candidate Russ Diamond were unable to secure the necessary signatures to appear on the ballot. On August 11, Green Party candidate Marakay Rogers withdrew her nominating papers, following a challenge by Pennsylvania Democrats, who alleged that more than 69,000 signatures on the petitions were fake names, unregistered voters or illegible. The challenge followed a Republican drive to collect signatures to put Green candidate Carl Romanelli on the ballot in the Senate race.

Rogers continued to campaign, hoping that a federal appeals court would rule favorably in a lawsuit seeking to overturn the state's signature requirement for third-party candidates.

=== Analysis ===
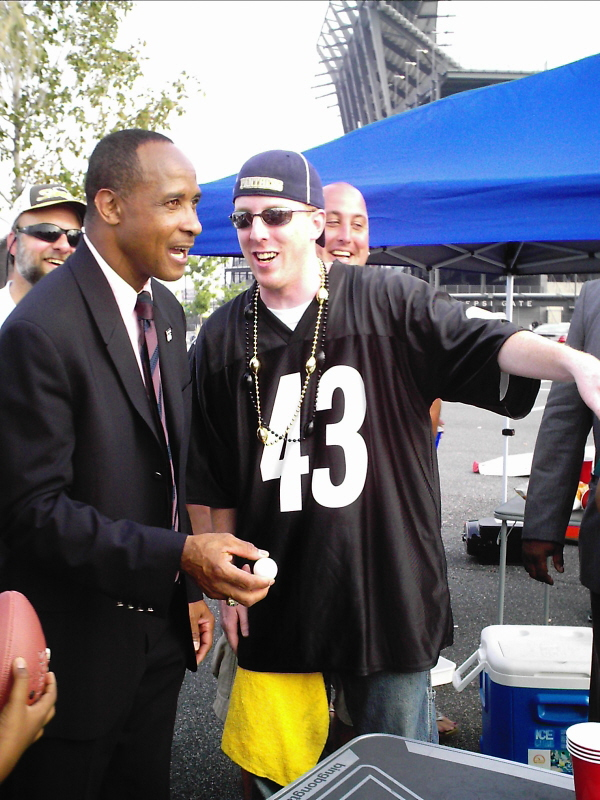
Former Steeler Lynn Swann courts voters tailgating before a football game between Pennsylvania's two football teams, the Pittsburgh Steelers and the Philadelphia Eagles

In July 2005, a Zogby Poll showed Rendell with only a 47% to 41% lead over Lynn Swann. Some speculated that controversy over Act 72, proposed Medicaid cuts, and possibly even a legislative pay increase that was signed into law, had reduced the governor's popularity. Rendell led in other recent polls by significantly higher margins. Following that poll, Rendell's supporters pointed out that he had raised more money than his opponents, which they felt would help him spread his message. They also pointed out that as a sitting governor, Rendell had all the traditional advantages of an incumbent.

Swann hoped to perform strongly in the conservative "T" section of the state (the central and northern regions) and in his native western Pennsylvania area. Swann canvassed for votes among tailgating voters in Philadelphia before the Steelers game against the Eagles. On February 7, Swann served as master of ceremonies for the Pittsburgh Steelers's Super Bowl XL victory parade before 250,000 people. Polls in early February showed Swann and Rendell in a statistical tie. However, Swann's momentum did not survive an effective barrage of advertising from Rendell in early spring, and he had trouble keeping up with Rendell's effective fundraising. Swann's focus on reform never caught traction, possibly as a result of his vocal support for Chip Brightbill and Robert Jubelirer, legislative leaders who were defeated in the May 2006 primary election.

=== Predictions ===
Source	Ranking	As of
The Cook Political Report	Solid D	November 6, 2006
Sabato's Crystal Ball	Likely D	November 6, 2006
Rothenberg Political Report	Safe D	November 2, 2006
Real Clear Politics	Likely D	November 6, 2006

=== Polling ===
Poll source	Date(s) administered	Ed Rendell (D)	Lynn Swann (R)
Temple/Inquirer Poll	September 24, 2006	60%	33%
Rasmussen	September 22, 2006	56%	36%
Zogby/WSJ	September 11, 2006	51.6%	42.1%
Zogby/WSJ	August 28, 2006	48.4%	43.5%
Rasmussen	August 25, 2006	50%	38%
Strategic Vision	August 17, 2006	51%	41%
Quinnipiac	August 16, 2006	57%	38%
Rasmussen	July 26, 2006	50%	40%
Zogby/WSJ	July 24, 2006	47.5%	41.1%
Strategic Vision	July 20, 2006	49%	36%
Rasmussen	June 26, 2006	50%	36%
Quinnipiac	June 22, 2006	55%	31%
Zogby/WSJ	June 21, 2006	47.7%	43.4%
Strategic Vision	June 15, 2006	49%	38%
Rasmussen	May 25, 2006	52%	34%
Quinnipiac	May 12, 2006	55%	33%
Strategic Vision	May 10, 2006	49%	41%
Keystone Poll	May 3, 2006	49%	35%
Rasmussen	April 29, 2006	41%	44%
IssuesPA/Pew Poll	April 17–26, 2006	30%	29%
Muhlenberg	April 17–24, 2006	45%	39%
Strategic Vision	April 13, 2006	44%	42%
Quinnipiac	April 5, 2006	47%	37%
IssuesPA/Pew Poll	March 30, 2006	29%	35%
Rasmussen	March 28, 2006	44%	41%
Strategic Vision	March 15, 2006	44%	44%
Muhlenberg	March 4, 2006	46%	43%
Rasmussen	February 21, 2006	46%	43%
Quinnipiac	February 15, 2006	48%	36%
Keystone Poll	February 9, 2006	45%	42%
Strategic Vision	January 25, 2006	44%	46%
Rasmussen	January 19, 2006	43%	45%
Strategic Vision	December 21, 2005	45%	41%
Quinnipiac	December 13, 2005	48%	35%
Strategic Vision	November 16, 2005	45%	42%
Rasmussen	November 7, 2005	50%	36%
Strategic Vision	October 19, 2005	46%	41%
Keystone Poll	September 2005	53%	33%
Strategic Vision	September 12, 2005	48%	43%
Strategic Vision	August 2, 2005	47%	41%
Rasmussen	July 20, 2005	47%	41%
Keystone Poll	June 2005	42%	32%
Keystone Poll	March 2005	59%	29%

=== Debate ===
2006 Pennsylvania gubernatorial election debate
No.	Date	Host	Moderator	Link	Democratic	Republican
Key: P Participant A Absent N Not invited I Invited W Withdrawn						
Key: P Participant A Absent N Not invited I Invited W Withdrawn					Ed Rendell	Lynn Swann
1	Oct. 4, 2006	KDKA-TV; Pittsburgh Post-Gazette; Point Park University	Ken Rice	C-SPAN	P	P

=== Results ===
Pennsylvania gubernatorial election, 2006
Party	Candidate	Votes	%
Democratic	Ed Rendell (incumbent)	2,470,517	60.33
Republican	Lynn Swann	1,622,135	39.61
Write-in		2,670	0.06
Total votes		4,095,322	100.00
Turnout			50.05
Democratic hold			

==== Results by county ====
County	Ed Rendell Democratic		Lynn Swann Republican		Margin		Total votes cast
County	#	%	#	%	#	%	Total votes cast
Adams	13,034	43.28%	17,084	56.72%	-4,050	-13.44%	30,118
Allegheny	275,227	59.92%	184,063	40.08%	91,164	19.84%	459,290
Armstrong	9,552	41.27%	13,595	58.73%	-4,403	-17.46%	23,147
Beaver	35,510	54.99%	29,069	45.01%	6,441	9.98%	64,579
Bedford	6,372	38.29%	10,270	61.71%	-3,898	-23.42%	16,642
Berks	66,837	57.16%	50,096	42.84%	16,741	14.32%	116,933
Blair	15,435	39.85%	23,295	60.15%	-7,860	-20.30%	54,809
Bradford	8,485	44.30%	10,670	55.70%	-2,185	-11.40%	19,155
Bucks	163,739	70.11%	69,798	29.89%	93,941	40.21%	233,537
Butler	24,936	39.24%	38,613	60.76%	-13,677	-21.52%	63,549
Cambria	31,856	60.84%	20,506	39.16%	11,350	21.68%	52,362
Cameron	793	44.50%	989	55.50%	-196	-11.00%	1,782
Carbon	10,633	60.59%	6,917	39.41%	3,176	21.18%	17,550
Centre	23,415	53.87%	20,051	46.13%	3,364	7.74%	43,466
Chester	112,960	65.15%	60,437	34.85%	52,523	30.30%	173,397
Clarion	5,451	42.07%	7,505	57.93%	-2,054	-15.86%	12,956
Clearfield	12,938	50.21%	12,830	49.79%	108	0.42%	25,768
Clinton	5,464	55.73%	4,341	44.27%	1,123	11.46%	9,805
Columbia	9,281	50.55%	9,078	49.45%	203	1.10%	18,359
Crawford	11,695	41.92%	16,202	58.08%	-4,507	-16.16%	27,897
Cumberland	32,737	41.48%	46,189	58.52%	-13,452	-17.04%	78,926
Dauphin	39,711	45.64%	47,294	54.36%	-7,853	-9.28%	87,005
Delaware	154,249	73.93%	54,043	26.07%	99,846	47.86%	208,652
Elk	6,907	60.56%	4,499	39.44%	2,408	21.12%	11,406
Erie	50,042	58.12%	36,059	41.88%	13,983	16.24%	86,101
Fayette	22,603	59.33%	15,492	40.67%	7,111	18.66%	38,095
Forest	929	46.73%	1,059	53.27%	-130	-7.46%	1,988
Franklin	16,945	39.42%	26,043	60.58%	-9,098	-21.16%	42,988
Fulton	1,670	38.49%	2,669	61.51%	-999	-23.02%	4,339
Greene	7,055	55.44%	5,670	44.56%	1,385	10.88%	12,725
Huntingdon	5,490	40.39%	8,103	59.61%	-2,613	-19.22%	13,593
Indiana	12,953	49.17%	13,390	50.83%	-437	-1.67%	26,343
Jefferson	5,402	38.11%	8,774	61.89%	-3,372	-23.78%	14,176
Juniata	2,748	35.49%	4,995	64.51%	-2,247	-29.02%	7,743
Lackawanna	56,966	72.98%	21,905	27.02%	35,871	45.96%	78,061
Lancaster	62,934	41.79%	87,668	58.21%	-24,734	-16.42%	150,602
Lawrence	17,557	55.06%	14,329	44.94%	3,228	10.12%	31,886
Lebanon	16,813	42.47%	22,775	57.53%	-5,962	-15.06%	39,588
Lehigh	59,338	63.11%	34,692	36.89%	24,646	26.22%	94,030
Luzerne	64,628	67.55%	31,051	32.45%	33,577	35.10%	95,679
Lycoming	14,777	41.17%	21,116	58.83%	-6,339	-17.66%	35,893
McKean	5,044	46.13%	5,890	53.87%	-846	-7.74%	10,934
Mercer	19,888	52.17%	18,237	47.83%	1,651	4.34%	38,125
Mifflin	4,730	38.23%	7,642	61.77%	-2,912	-23.54%	12,372
Monroe	21,430	60.36%	14,071	39.64%	7,359	20.72%	35,501
Montgomery	211,651	71.66%	83,718	28.34%	127,933	43.32%	295,369
Montour	2,764	47.47%	3,059	52.53%	-295	-5.06%	5,823
Northampton	53,007	63.80%	30,081	36.20%	22,926	27.60%	83,088
Northumberland	13,470	50.62%	13,140	49.38%	330	1.24%	26,610
Perry	4,477	30.93%	9,998	69.07%	-5,521	-38.14%	14,475
Philadelphia	383,339	89.39%	45,502	10.61%	337,837	78.78%	428,841
Pike	7,393	53.02%	6,551	46.98%	842	6.04%	13,944
Potter	2,035	36.78%	3,498	63.22%	-1,463	-26.44%	5,533
Schuylkill	26,327	55.76%	20,886	44.24%	5,441	11.52%	47,213
Snyder	4,073	36.12%	7,203	63.88%	-3,130	-27.76%	11,276
Somerset	12,499	45.41%	15,028	54.59%	-2,529	-14.18%	27,527
Sullivan	1,264	49.78%	1,275	50.22%	-11	-0.44%	2,539
Susquehanna	8,239	54.52%	6,874	45.48%	1,365	9.04%	15,113
Tioga	5,126	41.02%	7,370	58.98%	-2,244	-17.96%	12,496
Union	5,006	43.50%	6,503	56.50%	-1,497	-13.00%	11,509
Venango	7,906	44.80%	9,742	55.20%	-1,836	-10.40%	17,648
Warren	7,278	55.46%	5,846	44.54%	1,432	10.92%	13,124
Washington	38,422	52.73%	34,440	47.27%	3,982	5.46%	72,862
Wayne	8,143	51.61%	7,635	48.38%	508	3.23%	15,778
Westmoreland	60,145	46.27%	69,854	53.73%	-9,709	-7.46%	129,999
Wyoming	5,518	53.87%	4,726	46.13%	792	7.74%	10,244
York	55,276	43.92%	70,592	56.08%	-15,316	-12.16%	125,868
Totals	2,470,517	60.36%	1,622,135	39.64%	848,382	20.72%	4,092,652

Counties that flipped from Republican to Democratic

- Cambria (largest municipality: Johnstown)
- Clinton (largest city: Lock Haven)
- Clearfield (largest city: DuBois)
- Columbia (largest city: Bloomsburg)
- Elk (largest city: St. Marys)
- Mercer (largest municipality: Hermitage)
- Centre (largest municipality: State College)
- Erie (largest municipality: Erie)
- Monroe (largest borough: Stroudsburg)
- Northumberland (largest borough: Sunbury)
- Pike (largest municipality: Matamoras)
- Susquehanna (largest municipality: Forest City)
- Wayne (largest municipality: Honesdale)
- Wyoming (largest municipality: Tunkhannock)
- Warren (largest city: Warren)

== See also ==
- 2006 United States Senate election in Pennsylvania
- 2006 United States gubernatorial elections
- 2005 Pennsylvania General Assembly pay raise controversy

== Sources ==
- Trostle, Sharon, ed. (2007). The Pennsylvania Manual. Vol. 118. Harrisburg: Pennsylvania Department of General Services. ISBN 978-0-8182-0318-3.
