= Jan Murphy =

American journalist

- Occupation: Journalist
- Notable credit: The Patriot-News

Jan Murphy is a journalist in Pennsylvania who works for The Patriot-News.

In 2007, she and colleague Craig Staudenmaier won the "Benjamin Franklin Award for Excellence" from the Pennsylvania Newspaper Association. In 2008, she was awarded a first place Keystone Press Award for "News Beat Reporting" and a second place Keystone Press Award in "Ongoing News Coverage" for her series on the Pennsylvania Higher Education Assistance Agency. She also won the Associated Press Managing Editors Award for a series called "Opening up PHEAA records."

In 2008, the political website PolitickerPA.com named her one of the "Most Powerful Political Reporters" in Pennsylvania. In 2009, she and Charlie Thompson shared an "Honorable Mention" Keystone Press Award in Spot News Reporting from the Pennsylvania Newspaper Association for their "Bonus Busts" coverage of the "Bonusgate" arrests.
