= G. Terry Madonna =

American political pundit and pollster

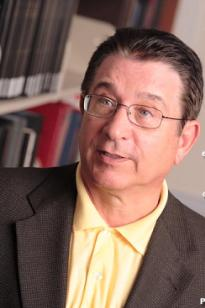
- Education: University of Delaware
- Known for: professor, pollster, pundit, author
- Scientific career
- Fields: Politics

G. Terry Madonna is a Senior Fellow in Residence at Millersville University of Pennsylvania. He was Professor of Public Affairs and Director of the Center for Politics and Public Affairs at Franklin and Marshall College. He is also the Director of the Franklin & Marshall College Poll. In the early 1970s, he served as County Commissioner of Lancaster County, Pennsylvania.

== Academic career ==
Madonna earned a Ph.D. in political history from the University of Delaware. His teaching and writing interests focus on the American presidency, American political parties and political behavior, and voting behavior. Prior to joining the faculty of Franklin and Marshall in May 2004, he was Professor and Chair of the Government Department at Millersville University of Pennsylvania and was director of its Center for Politics and Public Affairs. His academic writings have appeared in Pennsylvania Magazine of History and Biography, The Polling Report, Presidential Studies Quarterly, Pennsylvania History, Intellect, Academe, and The Journal of Practical Politics. He has delivered several named lectures, including the Neaman Foundation Lecture in 2006 and the annual James Buchanan Foundation Lecture, "From Buchanan to Bush: Campaign Practices Then and Now," and the annual Dwight D. Eisenhower Society Lecture, "The Political Skills and Leadership of Dwight D. Eisenhower" in 2007.

== Polling ==
Madonna founded the Keystone Poll in 1992, making it the oldest exclusively Pennsylvanian poll, and renamed it the Franklin and Marshall College Poll in 2008. The poll is used by the Philadelphia Daily News, Times-Shamrock Newspapers, WGAL-TV, the Pittsburgh Tribune Review, and WTAE-TV. He used to be the pollster for KYW-TV, WTXF-TV, the Comcast Network, WITF-TV, the Lancaster New Era, and the Harrisburg Patriot News. In 2008, the Franklin and Marshall partnered with Hearst-Argyle Television to conduct national polls for the company's television stations and radio stations.

== Punditry ==
In Philadelphia, the only thing more common than sports and war analogies in political reporting is quotes from G. Terry Madonna.

— Philadelphia City Paper

Madonna regularly appears as an analyst for WGAL-TV and as panelist on WPVI-TV's Inside Story. He frequently appears as a guest on talk radio programs across Pennsylvania. He has provided election coverage for WHYY-TV, WPVI-TV and WITF-TV. During the 1990s, he was a regular panelist on The Peoples’ Business, a public television news and commentary program. He is the current host of the weekly Pennsylvania news and commentary program, Pennsylvania Newsmakers. He has also contributed material to political web sites including MSNBC, The Hill, RealClearPolitics, and Fox News. He co-authors Politically Uncorrected a bi-weekly political commentary column that has been carried by Capitolwire and PoliticsPA. Reprints of the column occasionally appeared in other state and national news outlets, including stateline.org and RealClearPolitics. He has moderated forums and debates for gubernatorial, congressional, state legislative, and school board elections.

He has provided commentary and analysis for The New York Times, The Washington Post, The Los Angeles Times, The Wall Street Journal, USA Today, Philadelphia Inquirer, Philadelphia Daily News, Pittsburgh Tribune Review, The Christian Science Monitor, National Public Radio, CNN, ABC News, and CBS News. He has appeared as a guest on CNN's Inside Politics, CBS News, ABC News, C-SPAN, Fox News, MSNBC, and NBC News.

== Awards and recognition ==
As a college professor, he has received the Distinguished Professor award, given by the Pennsylvania Department of Education, the President's Medallion, given by Millersville University of Pennsylvania, and a "special commendation for scholarship and leadership," from the Board of Governors of the Pennsylvania State System of Higher Education. For his speeches and lectures, he was named "Outstanding Speaker of the Year" by the Speech Communication Society of Pennsylvania and was given the Daniel Roselle Award by the Middle States Council for the Social Studies. The Pennsylvania Report named him to the 2009 "The Pennsylvania Report 100" list of influential figures in Pennsylvania politics and noted that he is the "go-to professor for all things Pennsylvania politics." He was named to the PoliticsPA list of "Sy Snyder's Power 50" list of influential individuals in Pennsylvania politics in 2003.

== Works ==
- Madonna, G. Terry; Henry M. Libhart (1976). Revolutionary Lancaster: The Leadership. Lancaster, Pennsylvania: Sutter House. ISBN 978-0-915010-07-3. (1976)
- Madonna, G. Terry (1991). Reapportionment: A Primer for Pennsylvanians. Harrisburg, Pennsylvania: Commonwealth Foundation for Public Policy Alternatives. OCLC 23859825.
- Madonna, G. Terry (July 1994). Merit Selection of Appellate Judges: Why Its Time Has Come. Harrisburg, Pennsylvania: Commonwealth Foundation for Public Policy Alternatives. OCLC 31774696.
- Madonna, G. Terry; Berwood Yost (1996). Pennsylvania Votes: Presidential Primaries, 1972–1992: A Sourcebook. Millersville, Pennsylvania: Center for Politics and Public Affairs, Millersville University of Pennsylvania. OCLC 83697635.
- Madonna, G. Terry (2008). Pivotal Pennsylvania: Presidential Politics from FDR to the Twenty-First Century. Vol. Pennsylvania History Studies Series No. 31. Mansfield, Pennsylvania: Pennsylvania Historical Association. ISBN 978-1-932304-40-4.
