= PoliticsPA =

Pennsylvanian political news website

- Website type: Political News
- Available in: English
- Owners: Larry Ceisler, Jeff Jubelirer, David Urban (2010 – present); Ceisler Jubelirer (2007–2010); Publius Group (2001–2007)
- Creator: Sy Snyder (pseudonym)
- Website: www.politicspa.com
- Commercial: No
- Registration: No
- Launched: October 21, 2001; 24 years ago
- Current status: active

PoliticsPA.com is a website centered on the politics of Pennsylvania.

== Content ==
The website reports on political and campaign news in Pennsylvania, from the state legislature up to federal races. The editors write occasional features, like the weekly "Up & Down" scorecard and one-off lists like "Harrisburg's Smartest Staffers" and "Best Dressed Lobbyist" lists. In addition, PoliticsPa.com accepts anonymous tips; In 2012, it was the first news source to report that Tom Smith would challenge Bob Casey in the United States Senate race, as well as the fact that Governor Tom Corbett had endorsed Steve Welch in the contest. In 2004, it was the first news source to report in 2004 that Pennsylvania Senator Arlen Specter would face Pat Toomey in the Republican primary and that Joe Hoeffel would seek the Democratic nomination that year. On occasion, the website hosts original documents including political television and radio ads, campaign fliers, and controversial letters.

The editors of the website operate under the pseudonym "Sy Snyder," a nod to the former Pennsylvania Governor Simon Snyder Terry Madonna, professor at Franklin and Marshall College, said in 2003 that the level of expertise demonstrated on the site implies that "Sy Snyder" must be a reporter, a politician or a consultant. Specific speculation ranges from political reporters Pete DeCoursey and Charlie Thompson to former State Representative Tom Druce.

== Influence ==
By 2003, the site had become a popular fixture among political junkies and insiders, focusing on detailed political minutiae and "scuttlebutt." In spite of the small size of this audience, PoliticsPA.com became one of the "most influential forces in state political circles." Observers have compared it to the Drudge Report and subscription-based news sites the National Journal's The Hotline and Capitolwire.

The website grew from 11,000 hits per month at its launch on October 22, 2001, to almost 40,000 hits per month in April 2004. In the run up to the 2012 primary, it received over 150,000 hits per month.

The Columbia Journalism Review described PoliticsPA after the 2012 U.S. election as a news source that has "managed to break traditional journalistic boundaries and maintain a high level of quality, authority, and urgency." The Washington Post blog "The Fix" also named the website as the best Pennsylvania political blog in 2011.

== History ==
PoliticsPA was founded on October 22, 2001.

The website was created by the Publius Group, a New Jersey–based media organization which, at the time. operated five similar state-based political websites, including PoliticsNJ, PoliticsVT, and PoliticsNY. Ceisler Jubelirer, a Pennsylvania-based media relations group, including Larry Ceisler and Jeff Jubelirer, purchased the website from the Publius Group in January 2007. Ceisler Jubelirer separated in 2010 and currently share ownership of the site along with lobbyist David Urban. The current owners maintained a similar structure, including using the "Sy Snyder" pseudonym.

In 2005, the Pennsylvania Historical and Museum Commission sent PoliticsPA.com a "cease and desist" letter warning against displaying an image of the Commission's historical marker commemorating Simon Snyder, which was protected as a federal trademark. State Representative Mike Veon successfully lobbied the Commission to relax its image policy, allowing use in "legitimate promotion."
