= The Price of Life =

The Price of Life may refer to:

- The Price of Life (1987 film), an American film
- The Price of Life (1994 film), a Croatian film
- Price of Life, a 2009 American documentary film
