= Ceisler =

Ceisler is a surname. Notable people with the surname include:

- Danny Ceisler, American politician
- Larry Ceisler, American public relations manager
- Rich Ceisler (1956–2014), American stand-up comedian, author, and director
