= The Villanovan =

US university newspaper

- Type: Weekly student newspaper
- Format: Broadsheet: 11 3/8" × 13 3/4"
- Owner: Villanova University
- Founded: 1916
- Headquarters: Dougherty Hall 201; Villanova University; 800 Lancaster Ave; Villanova, PA 19085
- Circulation: 750
- Website: villanovan.com

The Villanovan is a student-run, American university newspaper that is produced in Villanova, Pennsylvania. It has been the officially recognized and accredited student newspaper of Villanova University since its founding in 1916.

== History and description ==
This tabloid-style, weekly paper publishes every Thursday during the semester and maintains a circulation of 750 copies which are distributed throughout the Villanova campus and at various locations in the surrounding community. The Villanovan also has a digital circulation website which regularly releases its material. It is staffed by more than 150 undergraduate students. All content of The Villanovan is the responsibility of the editors and the editorial board and does not necessarily represent the views of the administration, faculty and students of Villanova University unless specifically stated. While The Villanovan is owned by Villanova University, Villanova University subscribes to the principle of responsible freedom of expression for the student editors.

== Awards (since 2005) ==
- Newspaper Pacemaker Finalist from the Associated Collegiate Press (2010)
- First Place with Special Merit from the American Scholastic Press Association (2009–2010)
- Best Sports Coverage from the American Scholastic Press Association (2009–2010)
- Best Sports Photo from the American Scholastic Press Association for The Magazine section (2009–2010)
- First Place with Special Merit from the American Scholastic Press Association (2008–2009)
- Best Section Award from the American Scholastic Press Association for The Magazine section (2008–2009)
- Best Investigative Reporting Award from the American Scholastic Press Association (2008–2009)
- Second Place Keystone Press Award for Spot News from the Pennsylvania Newspaper Association (2009)
- First Place for Broadsheet News Page Design for Newspapers from the Columbia Scholastic Press Association (2008)
- First Place for Black & White Full Page Advertisement for Newspapers from the Columbia Scholastic Press Association (2008)
- Certificate of Merit in Sports Photograph Portfolio of Work for Newspapers from the Columbia Scholastic Press Association (2008)
- Certificate of Merit in Editorial Page Cartoons for Newspapers from the Columbia Scholastic Press Association (2008)
- Second Place for Tabloid Feature Cover from the Columbia Scholastic Press Association's Collegiate Circle (2007)
- Certificate of Merit for Editorial Writing from the Columbia Scholastic Press Association's Collegiate Circle (2007)
- Certificate of Merit for portfolio of work in the Feature Photograph category from the Columbia Scholastic Press Association's Collegiate Circle (2007)
- Pennsylvania Newspaper Association's Keystone Press Award for Best Feature Story
- First Place with Special Merit and Outstanding Sports Coverage from the American Scholastic Press Association
- American Scholastic Press Association Top-Scoring Newspaper for 2007–2008
