= Price of Life =

- Theatrical release poster
- Directed by: Dan Hunt; Margaux LaPointe
- Written by: J.D. Durkin; Liz Malinowski; Heather West
- Produced by: Stephen McWilliams; John O'Leary
- Starring: Robert Childs; Kofi Asante; Muhammad Shakur
- Edited by: Jason Furrer (sup); Ryan Mahoney; John Trevor Gladych
- Music by: Shea Quinn; Topher Wright
- Distributed by: One Way Street Productions
- Release date: 2009
- Country: United States
- Language: English

Price of Life is a short student-made documentary film exploring the life of Robert Childs, a former Philadelphia, USA, drug dealer and gangster.

== Reception ==
On May 10, 2009, Price of Life was shown on @Issue, a Philadelphia NBC10 program. Robert Childs, subject of Price of Life, and Dr. John O'Leary, a Villanova University faculty member and adviser to the film students, talked with Steve Highsmith about the film and the social issues surrounding it. The film's director, Margaux LaPointe, and the unit production manager J.D. Durkin, also talked with Highsmith on the show.

On August 17, 2009, The Philadelphia Inquirer published an article on Price of Life and the student filmmakers. Childs and fellow filmmakers Muhammad Shakur and Kofi Asante, along with course instructors, were interviewed about their experience during and after the production of the film.

The Villanova University newspaper, The Villanovan has been tracking the progress of the film since before its first screening and has, to date, published three articles.
