= Villanova University =

Catholic university in Pennsylvania, US

- Former name: Saint Augustine's Academy (1811–1842) Augustinian College of Villanova (1842–1953)
- Motto: Veritas, Unitas, Caritas (Latin)
- Motto in English: "Truth, Unity, Love"
- Type: Private research university
- Established: 1842; 184 years ago
- Founder: Order of Saint Augustine
- Religious affiliation: Catholic (Augustinian)
- Academic affiliations: ACCU; ASEA; NAICU; PCRC; Space-grant
- Endowment: $1.63 billion (2026)
- President: Peter M. Donohue
- Students: 10,299 (fall 2024)
- Undergraduates: 7,255 (fall 2024)
- Postgraduates: 3,044 (fall 2024)
- Location: Villanova, Pennsylvania, United States; 40.03771°N 75.33755°W
- Campus: 430 acres (170 ha); Large suburb
- Other campuses: Radnor
- Newspaper: The Villanovan
- Colors: Blue and white
- Nickname: Wildcats
- Sporting affiliations: NCAA Division I – Big East; Big 5; CAA Football
- Mascots: Will D. Cat (current); Count Villan (former)
- Website: villanova.edu

Villanova University is a private Catholic research university in Villanova, Pennsylvania, United States. It was founded by the Order of Saint Augustine in 1842 and named after Saint Thomas of Villanova. The university is the oldest Catholic university in Pennsylvania and one of two Augustinian institutions of higher learning in the United States (the other being Merrimack College).

The university traces its roots to the old Saint Augustine's Church, Philadelphia, which Augustinian friar Matthew Carr founded in 1796, and to its parish school, Saint Augustine's Academy, which was established in 1811. It is classified among "R2: Doctoral Universities – High research activity".

== History ==
In October 1841, two Irish Augustinian friars from St. Augustine's Church in Philadelphia, with the intention of starting a school, purchased 200 acres (81 ha) in Radnor Township. Known as "Belle Air", the estate belonged to the late John Rudolph, a merchant of Burlington, New Jersey and Philadelphia. The school, which was called the "Augustinian College of Villanova", opened in 1842. Besides the novitiate and college, the Augustinians had pastoral care of Catholics living within a fifteen-mile radius. Bishop Francis Kenrick dedicated the chapel in 1844. Parishes at Berwyn, Bryn Mawr, and Wayne developed from the Villanova mission.

However, the Philadelphia nativist riots of 1844 that burned Saint Augustine's Church in Philadelphia caused financial difficulties for the Augustinians, and the college was closed in February 1845. The college reopened in 1846 and graduated its first class in 1847. In March 1848, the governor of Pennsylvania incorporated the school and gave it the power to grant degrees. In 1859, the first master's degree was conferred. In 1857, the school closed again as the demand for priests in Philadelphia prevented adequate staffing, and the crisis of the Panic of 1857 strained the school financially. The school remained closed throughout the Civil War and was used as a military hospital. It reopened in September 1865; since then it has operated continuously. Its prep school later moved to Malvern, a town along the Main Line. Today it is called Malvern Preparatory School and is still run by the order.

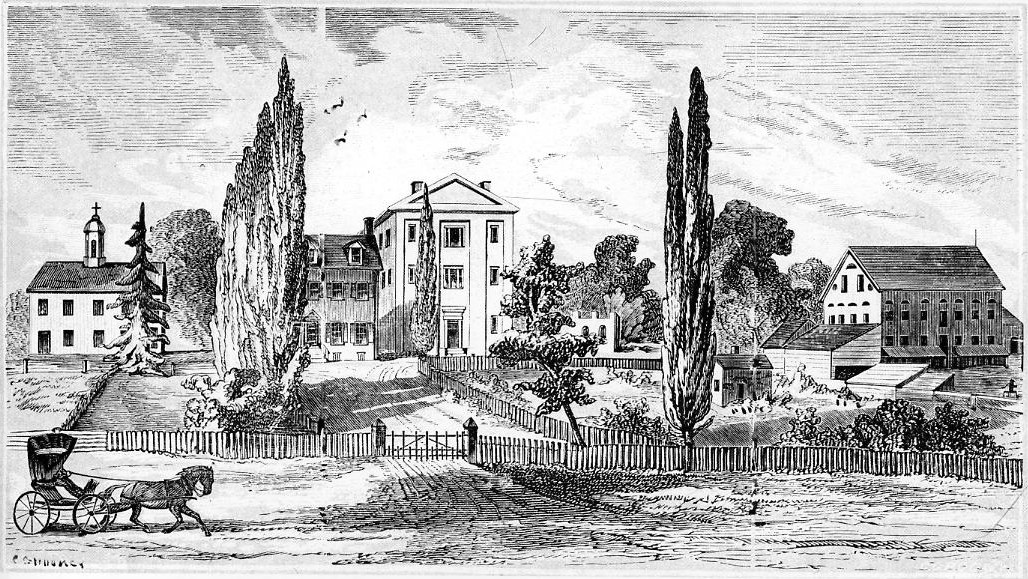
Villanova College in 1849

Villanova was all-male until 1918 when the college began evening classes to educate nuns to teach in parochial schools. In 1938, a laywoman received a Villanova degree for the first time. When the nursing school opened in 1953, women began attending Villanova full-time. In 1958, the College of Engineering admitted its first female student; other colleges admitted women only as commuters. Villanova University became fully coeducational in 1968.

During World War II, Villanova was one of 131 colleges and universities nationally that took part in the V-12 Navy College Training Program which offered students a path to a Navy commission. It has since graduated 25 US Naval Admirals and Marine Corps Generals; only the Naval Academy in Annapolis has generated more.

After World War II, Villanova expanded, returning veterans swelling enrollments and the faculty growing fourfold. Additional facilities were built, and in 1953, the college of Nursing and the School of Law were established. Villanova achieved university status on November 18, 1953. Between 1954 and 1963, 10 new buildings were built or bought on land adjacent to the campus, including Bartley, Mendel, and Dougherty Halls.

Villanova and Cabrini University issued a joint statement on June 23, 2023, announcing that Cabrini would cease operations in 2024 and be incorporated into Villanova. In March 2025, leadership of Rosemont College and Villanova University announced that the two institutions would merge by 2027.

== Campus ==
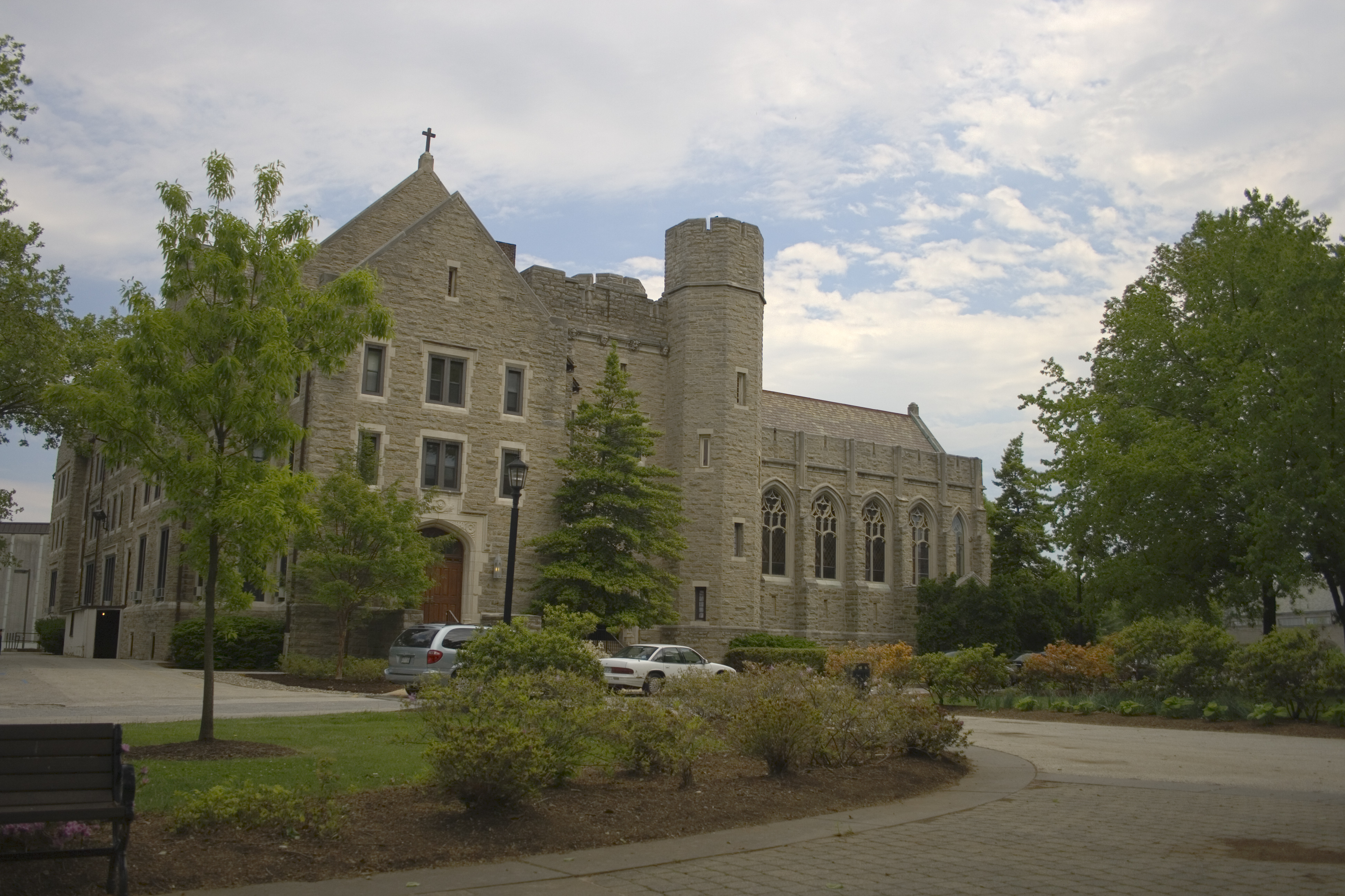
Corr Hall from The Grotto

The university is within the Villanova census-designated place in Radnor Township.

Villanova University, when including the new Cabrini and Rosemont campuses, sits on 430 acres (1.7 km^{2}) of land, situated 12 miles (19 km) from Center City Philadelphia. The campus has roughly 1,500 trees. The campus was formerly known as Arboretum Villanova, but its status as an official arboretum was revoked after the university failed to meet rules and standards such as planting enough new trees and offering tours.

=== Main campus ===
The most prominent campus feature is St. Thomas of Villanova Church, whose dual spires are the university's tallest structure. The cornerstone was laid in 1883, and construction ended in 1887.

Alumni Hall dates back to 1848 and stands as one of the oldest structures on campus. It was used as a military hospital in wartime and for influenza patients after World War I.

St. Mary's Hall was built in 1962. Laid out with long corridors and over a thousand rooms, there is a large, recently deconsecrated chapel and many partial floors, basements and sub-basements to feed the legends of blocked-off wings.

Falvey Library, the campus's main research library, houses over 1 million books, thousands of periodicals, and television production studios. It is named after the Augustinian monk and librarian Daniel Patrick Falvey (1906–1962), who worked there for many years. The library is renowned for VuFind, its open-source discovery system which is now used by many other libraries worldwide.

== Academics ==
According to the National Science Foundation, Villanova spent $33.1 million on research and development in 2024, ranking it 266th in the nation.

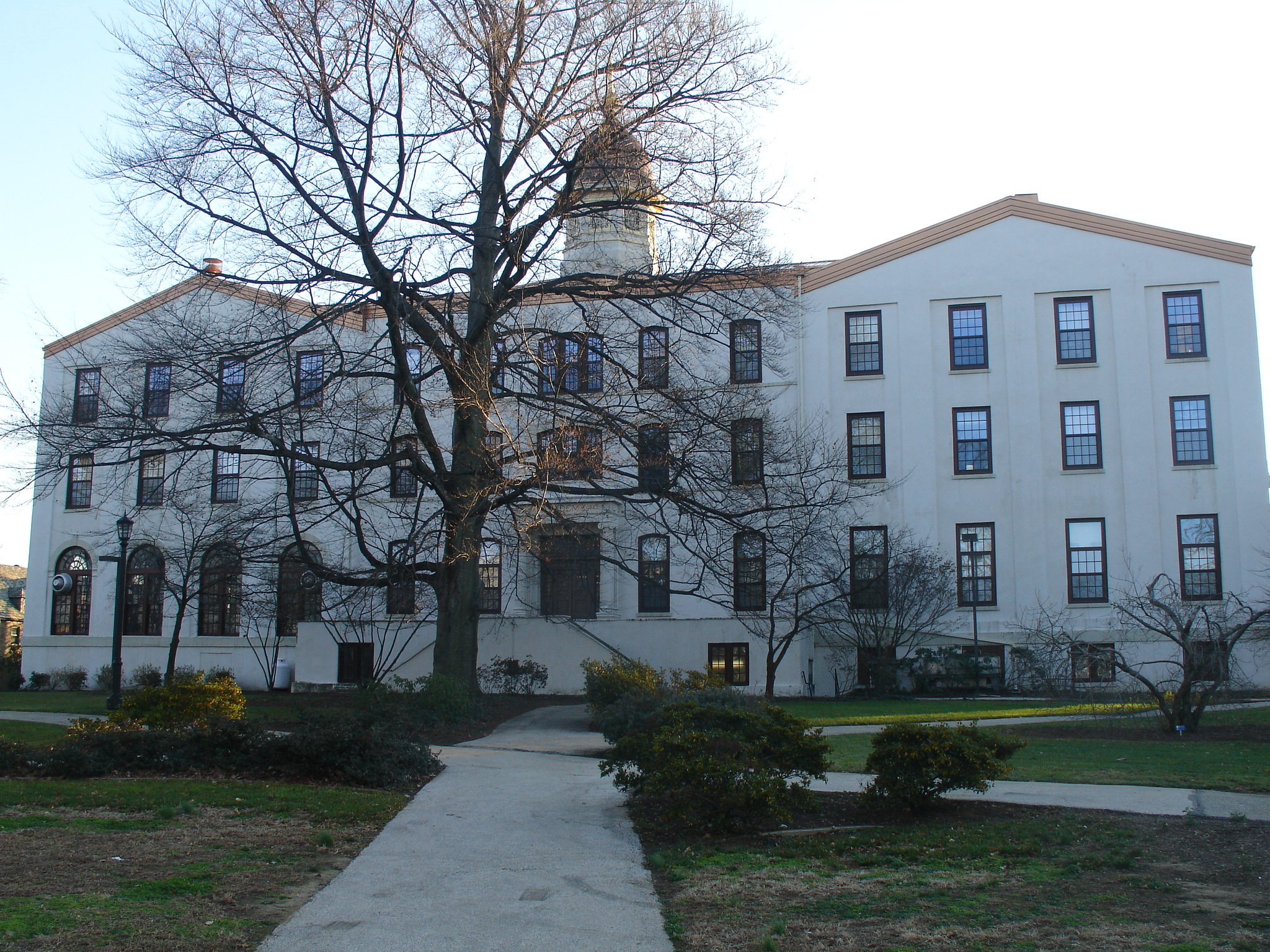
Alumni Hall, the oldest building on campus

Academic rankings

National
- Forbes: 88
- U.S. News & World Report: 42
- Washington Monthly: 65
- WSJ/College Pulse: 95

Global
- U.S. News & World Report: 959

=== Rankings ===
In the early 2010s, Villanova mounted an effort to attain "national university" status. It expanded its doctoral programs to produce 20 PhDs per year, which helped raise its Carnegie Classification to "R2: Doctoral Universities: High Research Activity". This led U.S. News & World Report to add Villanova to its "National Universities" rankings in September 2016.

As of 2011, Villanova University had for a decade been ranked No. 1 by U.S. News & World Report in the "Best Masters Universities-category, Northern Region", a ranking for schools which offer undergraduate and masters programs but few doctoral programs. In 2016, the publication ranked Villanova No. 2 in "Best Value Schools" and No. 4 for "Best Undergraduate Teaching" in the "Best Masters Universities-category, Northern Region", and ranked the engineering school No.11 among national undergraduate engineering programs whose highest degree is a masters.

In 2026, U.S. News & World Report ranked Villanova as the 42nd-best U.S. national university and the 63rd "Best Value School".

The Villanova School of Business was ranked No. 1 in the U.S. in Bloomberg Businessweek's 2016 rankings of undergraduate business schools, but this led to controversy and challenge. As a result, Bloomberg no longer ranked undergraduate business schools after 2016. In 2007 Villanova was No. 29 in the Financial Times' ranking of top executive MBA programs. However, Villanova remains unranked in U.S. News & World Report rankings of best business schools since 2023.

Villanova University School of Law was tied for 49th among all U.S. law schools by the 2026 edition of U.S. News & World Report's "Best Law Schools". The School of Law had suffered a drop in ranking in 2011, after it was determined that law school admissions staff had inflated reported LSAT scores for admitted students. According to the ABA, these infractions were enough to justify a removal of the school's accreditation, although the university's quick response resulted only in a censure of the school.

=== Admissions ===
Admission to Villanova has been deemed "more selective" by U.S. News & World Report. The university offers three ways to apply: Early Decision (binding), Early Action and Regular Decision.

For fall 2023, Villanova received 23,721 freshmen applications; 4,870 were admitted (21%) for a class of 1700. The middle 50% GPA range: 4.20–4.58 on a weighted 4.00 scale. The middle 50% SAT scores of the recently admitted class: 1450–1520/1600, ACT: 33–35/36.

In 2019, Villanova announced recruiting partnerships with the Posse Foundation, Philadelphia Futures and the Guadalupe Center.

== Student life ==
Student body composition as of May 2, 2022
Race and ethnicity	Total
White	72%
Hispanic	9%
Asian	6%
Black	5%
Other (Note: Other consists of Multiracial Americans & those who prefer to not say.)	4%
Foreign national	2%
Economic diversity
Low-income (Note: The percentage of students who received an income-based federal Pell grant intended for low-income students.)	10%
Affluent (Note: The percentage of students who are a part of the American middle class at the bare minimum.)	90%

Villanova's student organizations include standard club sports, cultural organizations, Greek-letter fraternities and sororities, and more. Villanova students participate in charitable and philanthropic activities and organizations, including the largest student-run Special Olympics in the world.

=== Charity and community service organizations ===
The Catholic Augustinian school has an active Campus Ministry.

The annual Special Olympics Fall Festival at Villanova University is the largest and most successful student-run Special Olympics in the world. It draws more than 1,000 athletes and 400 coaches from 44 Pennsylvania counties. Athletes may advance through the festival to regional and international competition. Students apply to be a part of the 82-volunteer planning committee, which works for more than nine months alongside Special Olympics Pennsylvania (SOPA), which oversees more than 300 events statewide.

Villanova University holds an annual NOVAdance year-long fundraising effort that culminates with a 12-hour dance marathon each Spring, raising money in support of the Andrew McDonough B+ (Be Positive) Foundation. NOVAdance began in 2014, and has since then become a yearly event.

The Villanova University community is noted for its participation in Habitat for Humanity In 2004, Villanova had more participants in the Habitat for Humanity Collegiate Challenge than any other U.S. university.

Villanova's School of Engineering maintains a student chapter of Engineers Without Borders, a non-profit organization that focuses on helping to improve the living conditions of communities worldwide.

The chapter's inaugural project was to design and build a playground for a grade school in New Orleans following the tragic events of Hurricane Katrina. Villanova EWB was the only student organization to win an award from the regional Project Management Institute, receiving an Honorable Mention from PMI for project of the year. The most recent project involved designing and building a water treatment and distribution system which provided an orphanage and surrounding villages in northern Thailand with drinking water and irrigation for their crops.

The Blue Key Society consists of around 200 volunteer campus tour guides who work with the Admissions Office to give three tours each weekday, various special tours as needed and selected weekend tours throughout the school year.

=== Student Government Association ===
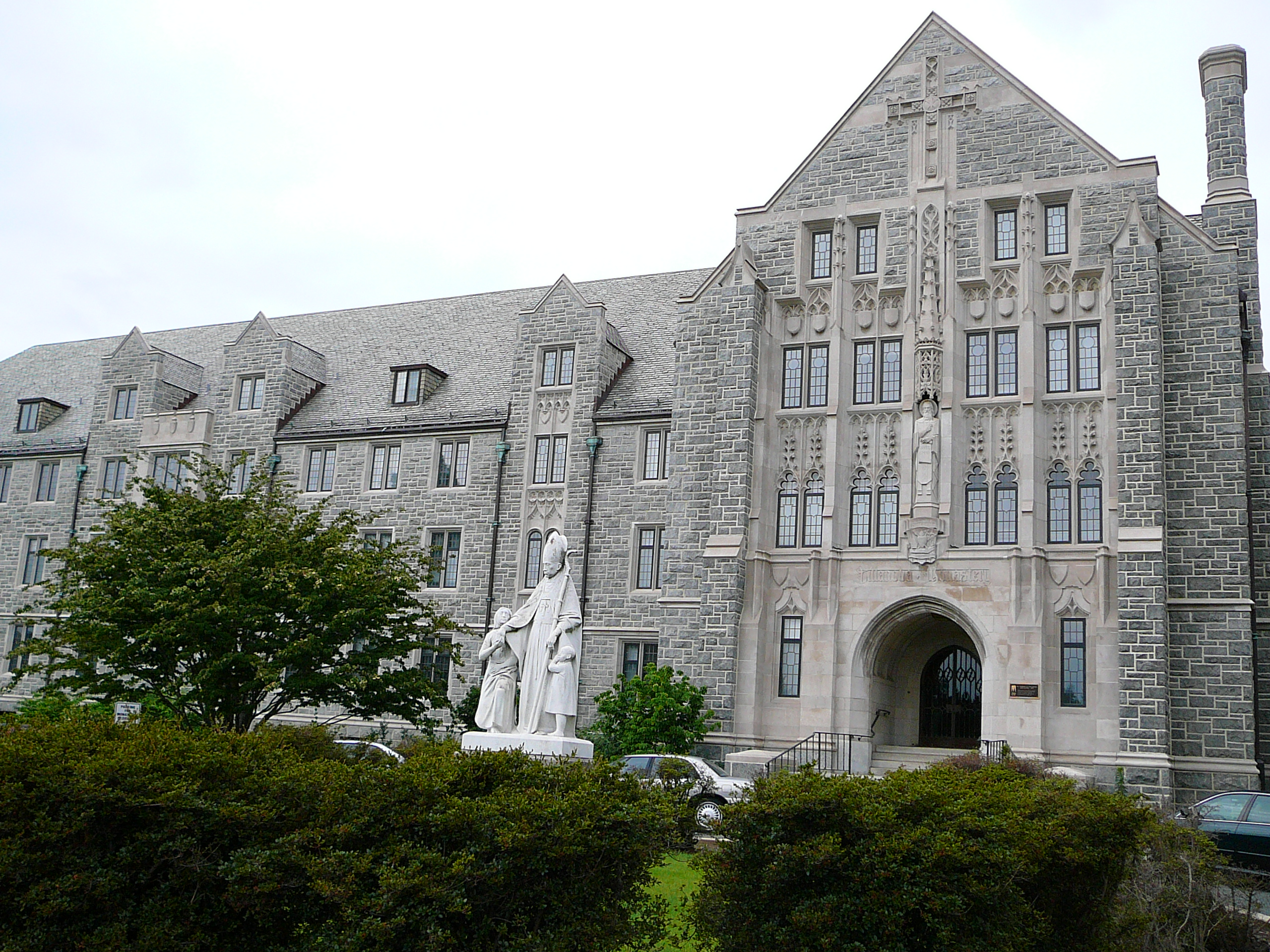
St. Thomas of Villanova Monastery

Founded in 1925, the Student Government Association (SGA) operates through its three branches (the Executive Branch, the Senate, and the Judicial Council). The Executive Branch is led by the President of the Student Body and Executive Vice President, and consists of the Chief of Staff and Directors of Athletics; Finance; Programming; and Public Relations. The Senate is led by the Speaker of the Senate and consists of thirty-four Senators total, twenty-two elected representatives from the classes and schools and twelve appointed representatives from University offices and student organizations. The Judicial Council is led by the Chief Justice and consists of four Associate Justices and a Judicial Clerk.

=== Fraternities and sororities ===
Roughly 30% of Villanova students identify with one of eleven fraternities, twelve sororities, and one service fraternity. There are no fraternity or sorority houses on-campus. The first Greek organization at the school was established in 1902 as a social organization and circle of individuals interested in classical studies.

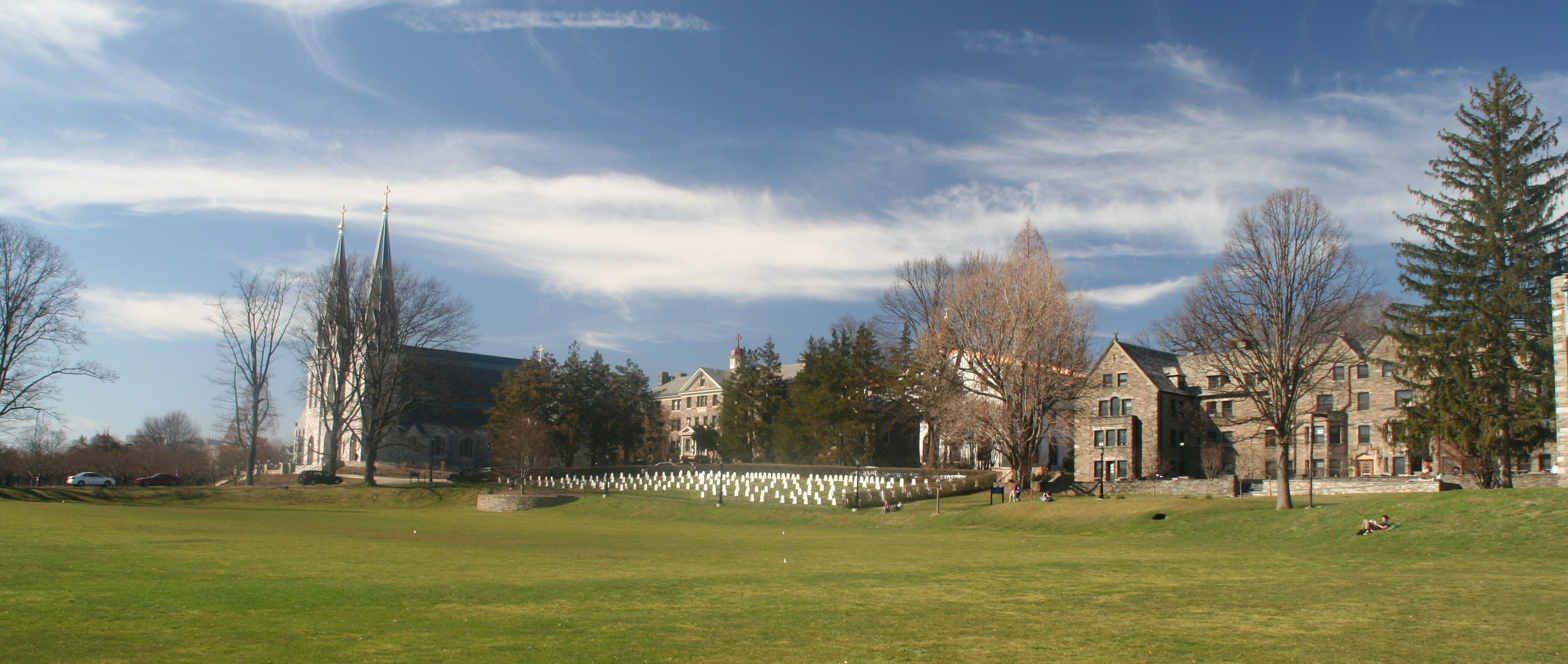
A panoramic view of the Main Campus in early spring

=== Villanova Emergency Medical Service ===
Villanova Emergency Medical Service (VEMS), is a student-run ambulance service licensed and dedicated to serving the campus community. VEMS membership consists of more than 40 undergraduate student volunteers; the majority of whom are certified as Emergency Medical Technicians, volunteering more than 25,000 hours annually. Villanova is one of only a handful of colleges to provide EMS services to their campus, and one of only 52 who provide emergency response and transport to at least the Basic Life Support (BLS) Level. VEMS has been recognized on a national level multiple times by the National Collegiate EMS Foundation (NCEMSF), specifically being named 2001 Campus Organization of the Year and receiving EMS website of the year in 2000, 2004, and 2006. Their skills competition team also placed in second at the 2011 Annual Physio-Control BLS Skills Competition. VEMS hosted the second annual NCEMSF Conference in 1995 as well as the twelfth annual conference in Philadelphia in 2005.

=== Campus publications and media ===
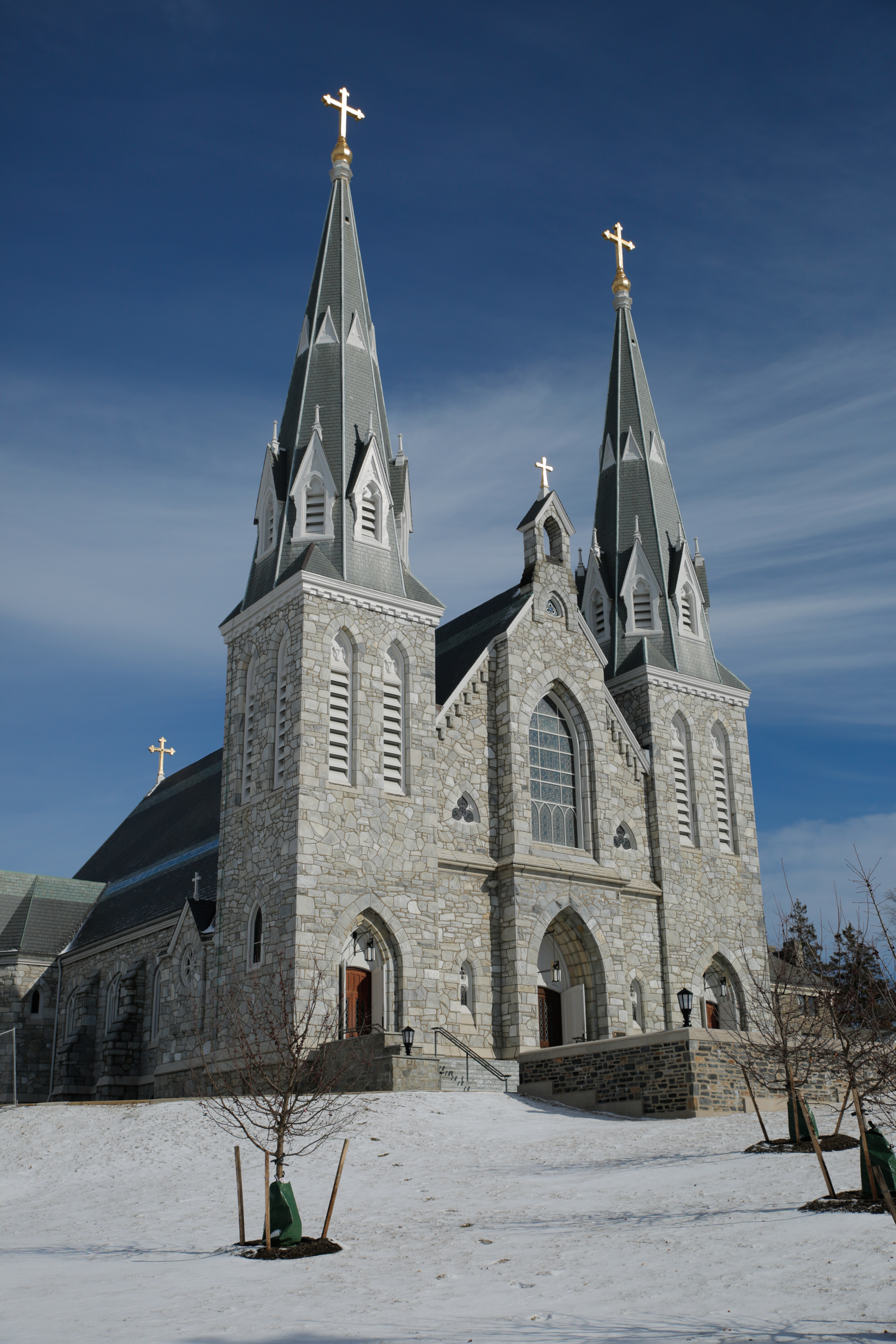
St. Thomas of Villanova Church

The Villanovan has been an officially recognized and accredited student newspaper since its founding in 1916. The university's newspaper of record, the tabloid-sized weekly usually produces 12 issues per semester, at 6,500 copies per issue.

The Belle Air Yearbook is the official yearbook of the university and has been a student-made production since 1922. The book is published by the L.G. Balfour Company. The book has won numerous awards over the years including the prestigious Columbia Scholastic Press Association Gold Crown Award in 1988 and 1989 and the Yearbook Award for their 2017 book and the National Yearbook Sample Award for their 2019 publication.

The Villanova Times, the independent bi-weekly student newspaper, won the Collegiate Network Award for Layout and Design in 2005–06, 2007–08 and 2008–09.

VTV is the student-run campus television station. Starting in 1999 as the Villanova TV Production Club, the station produces news, events, films and other programming for the Villanova community, and can be seen on the campus television network.

WXVU, the FCC-licensed student-operated FM radio station, operates at 89.1 megahertz. With an output of 75 watts, WXVU can be heard for 8 miles (13 km) around the campus and globally via the internet. Since 1991, the station has offered a varied program of music, news, sports, public affairs, and specialty programming.

POLIS Literary Magazine, a student publication printed once a semester by the Villanova University Honors Program, features writing and artwork by Villanova students and professors. Each issue features creative nonfiction, poetry, short fiction, and black-and-white photography focusing on a central theme.

Concept is an interdisciplinary journal of graduate studies sponsored by the Graduate Division of the College of Liberal Arts and Sciences. The 2009 student film Price of Life received critical attention.

=== NROTC ===
Since its inception in the summer of 1946, the NROTC unit on campus has produced 25 Admirals and Generals in the United States Navy and Marine Corps. At one point, there had only been two four-star generals in the U.S. Marine Corps, one of them the Commandant of the Marine Corps, and they had both been graduates of Villanova NROTC. In 2004, the commanders of both U.S. Naval Forces Atlantic (Admiral William J. Fallon) and U.S. Naval Forces Pacific (Admiral Walter F. Doran) were Villanova NROTC graduates. Admiral Fallon was later assigned as Commander, U.S. Central Command from March 2007 to March 2008. ADM Fallon was the first Navy officer to hold that position.

=== Student performing arts ===
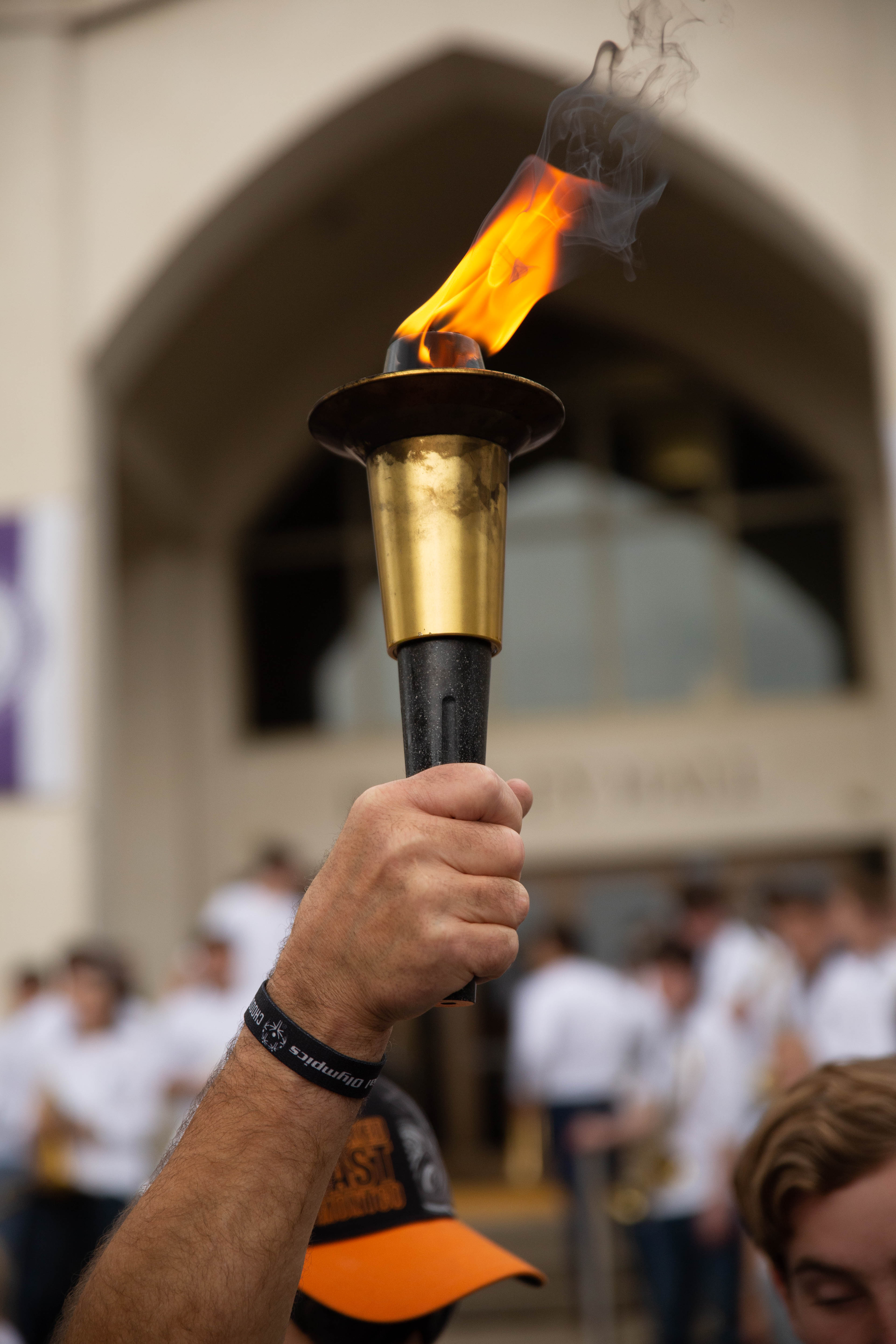
The Special Olympics Torch arrives at the Quad of Villanova University in November 2018.

Villanova University is without a formal music department; therefore, the Office of Student Performing Arts is charged with the organization of the student performing arts groups on campus. Due to the lack of a music department, student musicians are from every school in the university. Nearly 10% of the student body participates in various music related organizations.

The Villanova Band is the largest and oldest musical group at Villanova with over 100 members. The Villanova Band has four divisions: the Concert Band, the Scramble Band, the Pep Band, and the Jazz Ensemble. The Concert Band plays one concert at the end of each semester. It also performs throughout the Villanova community and on its annual "Fall Tour". The Scramble Band performs for Villanova Football games between plays and at halftime on the field. The Villanova Pep Band performs at Villanova Men's and Women's Basketball games, including post-season games such as the Big East Tournament. The Jazz Ensemble and Orchestra have end-of-semester concerts and perform on campus and around the Philadelphia area several times a year. The band is made up of students of every school within Villanova.

The second-largest musical group at Villanova, the Pastoral Musicians have about 60 voices and 35 instrumentalists, primarily undergraduates, up from 30 musicians in 1995. Their musical selection shows the diversity of style within the Catholic tradition: contemporary praise music from different cultures, Bach, Palestrina, Mozart, Lauridsen, and others.

Villanova's men's chorus, the Villanova Singers, was founded in 1953 by Dean Harold Gill Reuschlein, then Dean of the Law School. The Singers were established for the stated purpose of singing various types of music and enriching the cultural life of the university. Entirely student-run, the Singers are governed by a nine-member board of students and sing a wide range of musical styles and types, ranging from classical to contemporary. Within the Singers, there exists a smaller, student-directed a cappella group known as the Spires. Alumni of the Spires include Jim Croce, Tommy West and Manhattan Transfer member Tim Hauser.

The Villanova Voices women's chorus is the oldest women's organization at the university. Originally called the Villanova Women's Glee Club, the group was founded by 20 women from the university's College of Nursing in 1960, shortly after Villanova became coeducational. Their attendant a cappella group, the Haveners, is student-directed.

== Athletics ==
Villanova Wildcats logo

Villanova University teams are known as the Wildcats. They compete as a member of the NCAA Division I level, primarily competing in the Big East Conference. The Wildcats previously competed in the Eastern 8 Conference from 1975 to 1976 to 1979–80. Men's sports include baseball, basketball, cross country, football, golf, lacrosse, soccer, swimming & diving, tennis and track & field; while women's sports include basketball, cross country, field hockey, lacrosse, rowing, soccer, softball, swimming & diving, tennis, track & field, volleyball and water polo. The football and rowing team competes in the Colonial Athletic Association, while the women's lacrosse team competes in the Patriot League.

The Wildcats are also part of the Philadelphia Big 5, the traditional Philadelphia-area basketball rivalry. Their fiercest crosstown rivalry is with Saint Joseph's University ("St. Joe's"), the city's Jesuit university, and matches between them are called the "Holy War".

In the NCAA graduation report released on November 17, 2020, Villanova has a graduation-success rate (GSR) of 97 percent rate in the NCAA GSR method. In the GSR release, Villanova had 12 of its athletic programs post a perfect 100 percent graduation success rate for the 2010-2013 cohort. This data measures the percentage of student-athletes who entered college on institutional aid (whether athletics-based aid or otherwise) between those years and graduated within six years. Villanova had seven women's programs and five men's programs earn a 100 percent GSR in the release. The Villanova women's and men's basketball team are among the athletic program's 14 teams with a 100 percent graduation rate for 2010–13.

=== Men's basketball ===
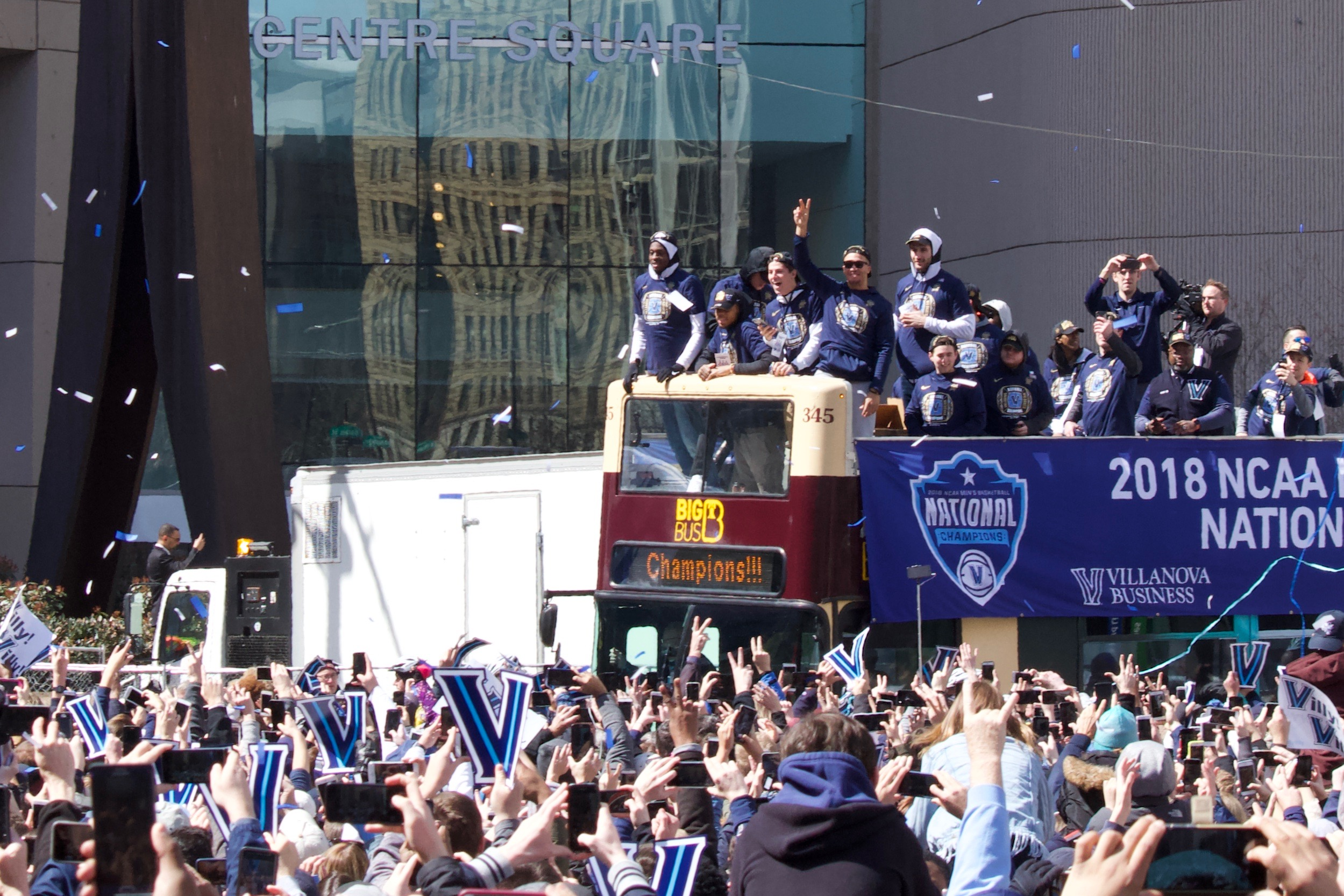
Championship parade in Center City, Philadelphia on April 5, 2018

In 1985, under the direction of coach Rollie Massimino, the men's basketball team won the NCAA Division I men's basketball tournament in the first year of the 64-team field. The final game, against defending champion and ten-point-favorite Georgetown, is often cited among the greatest upsets in college basketball history.

In 2016, the Wildcats won the 2016 NCAA Championship by defeating North Carolina 77–74. The game included the only buzzer-beater in NCAA Championship game history, when Kris Jenkins sank a three pointer to win the game.

In 2018, Villanova defeated the Michigan Wolverines 79–62 to win the 2018 NCAA Championship in San Antonio. The game was notable for featuring the highest scoring bench-player in NCAA Championship history in Donte Divincenzo, who scored 31 points and was awarded the Final Four MVP Award.

The home venues for the Wildcats include the on-campus 6,500 seat Finneran Pavilion for smaller attendance games, as well as the larger 20,478 seat Xfinity Mobile Arena within the South Philadelphia Sports Complex. The February 13, 2006, meeting between Villanova and the University of Connecticut set the record for the highest attendance at a college basketball game in Pennsylvania, with 20,859 attendees.

=== Football ===
The Villanova men's football team competes in the NCAA Football Championship Subdivision (formerly Division I-AA) in the Patriot League, as of 2026.

According to some sources, the 1906 Villanova team is credited with completing the first legal forward pass in football history.

=== Men's lacrosse ===
The Villanova men's lacrosse team competes in NCAA Division I as a member of the Big East Conference. Through 2009, Villanova men's lacrosse was a member of the Colonial Athletic Association and in 2009, Villanova won the CAA tournament as the fourth seed (the lowest-seeded championship team in conference history) for its first title. The team also made its first NCAA tournament appearance that year.

=== Track and field ===
Villanova University's track and field team has a long history of athletic success that has spanned from Big East Conference Championships to NCAA Championships.

The men's team has produced 69 NCAA Championships, 36 Indoor and 33 Outdoor. The team has had eight NCAA team Championships (four Cross Country, three Indoor, one Outdoor). Villanova has produced 28 athletes who have made appearances in the Olympics, 10 of whom have medaled (seven gold medals, three silver medals). The men's team has also won 112 Penn Relay Championships, which stands as the most wins by any school.

The women's team has also had a multitude of success, producing 11 Big East team Championships and nine NCAA team Championships, most recently winning the 2009 and 2010 NCAA Cross Country Championships. They have also produced nine Olympians including Ron Delany, Eamonn Coghlan, Vicki Huber, Sonia O'Sullivan, Kim Certain, Kate Fonshell, Jen Rhines, Carmen Douma, and Carrie Tollefson. The Women's team has won 28 Penn Relay Championships, which is the most wins by any women's team.

At least one Villanovan athlete has competed in every Summer Olympics since 1948, winning a total of 13 medals (nine gold, four silver).

== Traditions ==
=== University seal ===
An adaptation of the seal of the Order of St. Augustine, the seal of Villanova University is one of the campus's most ubiquitous images, adorning everything from buildings to chairs to backpacks. A ribbon carries the university motto: Veritas, Unitas, Caritas (Truth, Unity, and Charity), virtues to which every member of the Villanova community should aspire. A book symbolizes Augustine's dedication to education and the New Testament where he found Christianity. A cincture is part of the habit worn by members of the Order of Saint Augustine. Hovering above is the flaming heart, symbol of Augustine's search for God and his love of neighbors. Behind the book is the crosier – a staff traditionally held by a Bishop – commemorating Augustine's service as Bishop of Hippo. Above and behind the book are two crosses, symbolic of Augustine's conversion and the university's commitment to Catholicism. Framing the central portion of the seal is a laurel wreath exemplifying victory through the pursuit of knowledge, and 1842 is the year of the university's founding. Surrounding the seal is the incorporated fide of the university: Universitas Villanova In Statu Pennsylvaniae.

=== Liberty Bell's "Sister Bell" ===
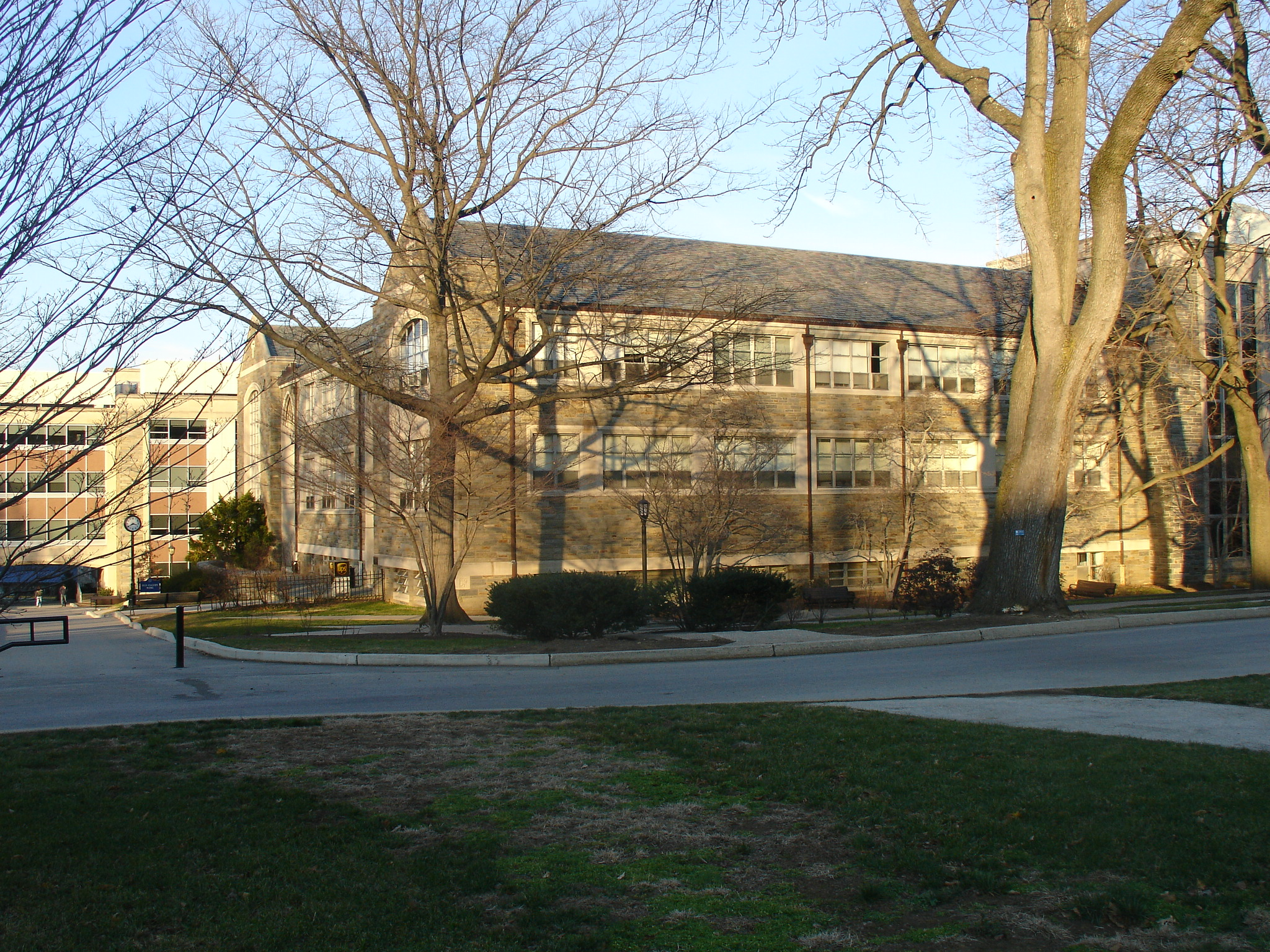
The old wing of the Falvey Library

Villanova University was home to the Liberty Bell's "Sister Bell", the replacement bell ordered from the Whitechapel Bell Foundry after the original bell cracked in 1753. This new bell was installed at the Pennsylvania State House, now known as Independence Hall, and attached to the State House clock. The Sister Bell rang the hours until the late 1820s, when the bell was removed during a renovation and loaned to the Olde St. Augustine Church in Philadelphia. In 1829, the bell was hung in a new cupola and tower designed by architect William Strickland. There it remained until May 8, 1844, when it was destroyed, along with the Olde St. Augustine Church, during the Philadelphia Nativist riots. The friars of the Order of Saint Augustine had the "Sister Bell" recast and transferred to Villanova University. The bell was moved off campus in 2011.

At the university's centennial celebration, the bell was rung by Archbishop Dennis Joseph Dougherty to open the ceremonies. In 1954, the bell was displayed as part of an exhibit at Gimbels department store in Philadelphia that focused on the growth and development of the university. The Sister Bell is currently enshrined in the Heritage Room on the basement floor of the St. Thomas of Villanova Monastery on the university's campus.

== Alumni ==
Villanova University has many notable alumni in religion, entertainment, sports, politics, military service, and business:

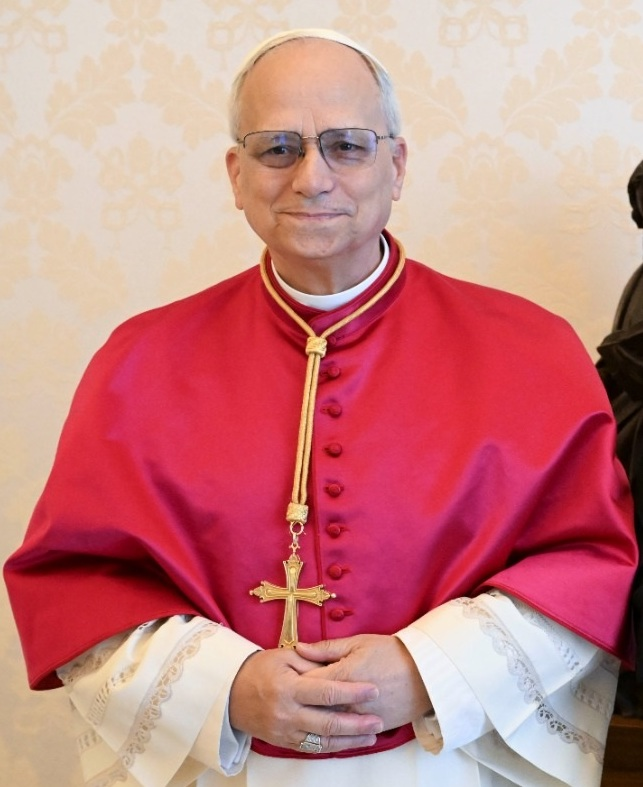
Pope Leo XIV, BS '77

Pope Leo XIV, the only American-born pope, graduated from the university in 1977, making Villanova the only American university with a pope among its alumni. Other notable alumni in the Catholic hierarchy include John Joseph O'Connor, Cardinal Archbishop of the Archdiocese of New York, and Emellia Prokopik, Superior General of the nuns of the Order of Saint Basil the Great.

Alumni in the entertainment industry include Golden Globe-nominated actress Maria Bello, NBC News (WCAU) and Emmy Award-winning news anchor Keith Jones, Peter Doocy, Fox News White House reporter, actor Jon Polito, founder of Manhattan Transfer Tim Hauser, singer-songwriters Jim Croce and Don McLean, Tony Award-winning playwright and screenwriter David Rabe, and fashion model and entrepreneur Katherine Parr.

Professional athletes from Villanova include NFL Hall of Famer, longtime FOX commentator and actor Howie Long, Eagles runningback Brian Westbrook, NBA players Randy Foye, Kyle Lowry, and New York Knicks’ Shooting Guards Mikal Bridges & Josh Hart and NBA Final's MVP and Knicks point guard Jalen Brunson.

Villanova has produced several governmental officials and political figures, including former First Lady of the United States Jill Biden, former Pennsylvania Governor Ed Rendell, former New Hampshire Senator and current Governor Kelly Ayotte (Villanova Law), and former Connecticut Governor John G. Rowland. Wife to the governor and federal judge for the United States Court of Appeals for the Third Circuit, Marjorie Rendell, is also a graduate.

Numerous Marine generals and navy admirals graduated from Villanova's Naval ROTC program, including William J. Fallon, Admiral in the United States Navy and Commander of United States Central Command; and George B. Crist, Marine General and the first Marine to be designated Commander in Chief, Central Command; Another graduate, Paul X. Kelley, served as Commandant of the United States Marine Corps. Joe Clancy, former Director of the United States Secret Service, is also an alumnus.
