= David Urban =

American lobbyist (born 1964)

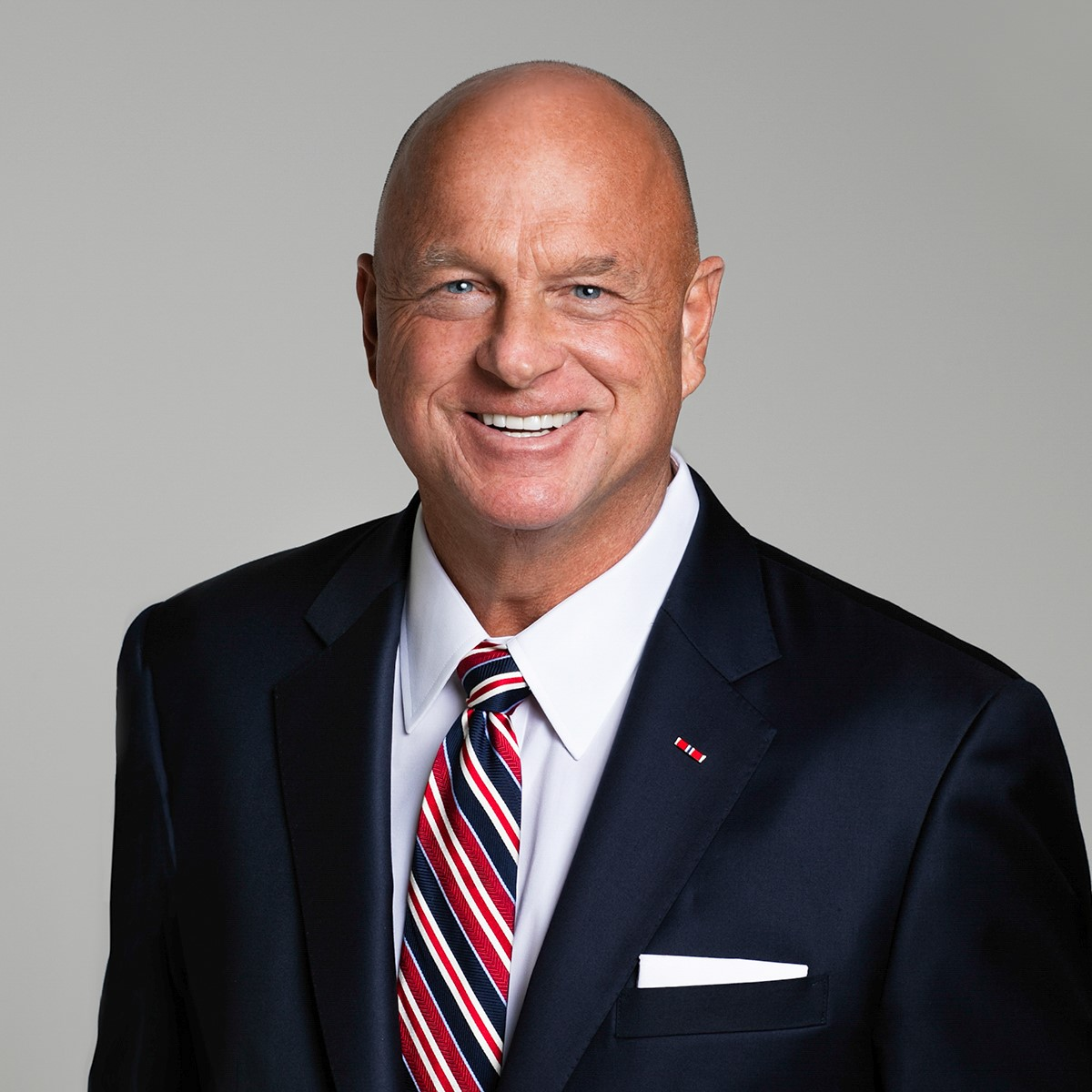

Chair of the American Battle Monuments Commission
- In office July 2018 – January 20, 2021
- President: Donald Trump
- Preceded by: Merrill McPeak
- Succeeded by: Mark Hertling

Personal details
- Born: David John Urban; March 6, 1964 (age 62) Aliquippa, Pennsylvania, U.S.
- Party: Republican
- Education: United States Military Academy (BS); University of Pennsylvania (MPA); Temple University (JD)

Military service
- Branch/service: United States Army
- Years of service: 1986–1991
- Rank: Captain
- Unit: 101st Airborne Division
- Battles/wars: Gulf War
- Awards: Bronze Star Medal

David Urban (born March 6, 1964) is an American lobbyist, consultant, political strategist, and senior political commentator for CNN. He serves as the managing director of BGR Group, of counsel at Torridon Law, and as an Operating Partner at Smash Capital. Urban served as executive vice president for North American Corporate Affairs at ByteDance, the parent company of TikTok. He serves on the boards of directors of publicly traded companies Virtu Financial (NYSE: VIRT), SAIC (NASDAQ: SAIC), and Eos Energy Enterprises (NASDAQ: EOSE), as well as the private company SubCom. Urban also serves on the boards of the nonprofit Edward M. Kennedy Institute for the United States Senate, the Johnny Mac Soldiers Fund, and the International Republican Institute.

Urban served as a senior advisor to the 2016 Donald Trump presidential campaign and helped orchestrate the 2016 Republican National Convention in a successful effort to win Pennsylvania. He also advised Trump's 2020 and 2024 re-election campaigns.

== Early life and education ==
Urban is the son of a union steelworker and a native of Aliquippa, Beaver County, Pennsylvania. He was recruited to play football at Harvard University, but opted to instead attend the United States Military Academy at West Point, where he was featured in the Black Knights' 1982 media guide. An injury cut short his football career, and he graduated in 1986 with a B.S. Urban later attended the University of Pennsylvania, where he earned an M.P.A., and Temple University School of Law, where he received a J.D.

He also completed the Leading Sustainable Corporations Programme at Oxford University in 2021 and earned a Stratfor Certification in Geopolitical Analysis through Florida Atlantic University in 2022.

== Career ==
=== Military career ===
Urban served as an artillery officer in the United States Army's 101st Airborne Division, from 1986 to 1991. While serving in the Persian Gulf, he was awarded the Bronze Star Medal for meritorious achievement during combat operations in Operation Desert Storm. He left active duty in 1991.

=== Early legal career ===
Urban began his legal career as an attorney at Ballard Spahr, a public finance attorney from 1994 to 1997. While at Ballard Spahr, he helped facilitate the issuance of tax-exempt obligations for the firm's clients as part of his public finance practice.

He is an active member of the Pennsylvania and Washington, D.C. bars and is admitted to practice before the Pennsylvania Supreme Court, the United States District Court for the Eastern District of Pennsylvania, the United States Court of Appeals for the Third Circuit, and the United States Supreme Court.

=== Political career ===
Urban's political career started in 1997, when he became chief of staff to U.S. Senator Arlen Specter (R-PA). He served as the senator's senior advisor for policy, legislative strategy, and political affairs, and managed the senator's Senate office for 5 years.

In April 2016, Urban joined Donald Trump's presidential campaign as senior advisor. He was the deputy director of caucus operations and a senior member of the campaign on the ground in Cleveland for the 2016 Republican National Convention, spending over two months on that effort, and working to quell disruption by "Never Trump" delegates from the campaigns of other candidates. Urban developed a relationship of frequent cell phone contact with Trump. In November 2016, Urban helped gain the first presidential Republican win in Pennsylvania in over 28 years, and it was initially reported that he was being considered as the next chair of the Republican National Committee It was reported that Urban had been considered for several positions in the Trump Administration, including White House Deputy Chief of Staff, White House Chief of Staff, and Ambassador to Saudi Arabia. It was frequently reported that Trump was considering Urban to replace Reince Priebus, and later John Kelly, as White House Chief of Staff.

In May 2018, he was appointed by President Trump to the board of the American Battle Monuments Commission, and in July 2018, he was elevated by Trump to be chairman of that commission. He led U.S. commemorative efforts for World War I and World War II anniversaries, including the 100th anniversary of the Armistice and the 75th anniversary of the D-Day landings and the Battle of the Bulge.

In August 2019, Trump appointed Urban to the Board of Trustees (Board of Visitors) of the United States Military Academy.

=== Other activities ===
Urban has served as an adjunct professor at Carnegie Mellon University's H. John Heinz III School of Public Policy and Management. He has served as a co-owner of PoliticsPA, a role he has held since 2007.

== Recognitions ==
Urban was recognized on The Hill's "Top Lobbyists" list for several years and was described by The New York Times as a "prominent Republican lobbyist." Campaigns & Elections characterized him as a "Mover and Shaker," while Politics Magazine identified him as a "Top Influencer." Washingtonian Magazine listed him among the most influential figures shaping policy in Washington, and Corporate Board Member Magazine named him one of "Washington's Top 10 Lobbyists."

He was also included in Board Prospects' "50 Military Board Members Making a Difference." Roll Call described him as an influential Republican moderate and pragmatist, PoliticsPA referred to him as a "powerhouse lobbyist," and Philadelphia Magazine noted his influence among members of Congress. In 2016, Politico included him in its list of the "30 most powerful people in Trump's Washington." He was listed among Washington Magazine's 500 Most Influential People of 2025 and 2026. He was profiled by Philadelphia Magazine, noting that "when Urban talks, Members of Congress listen."
