= Philadelphia College Radio Collective =

The Philadelphia College Radio Collective is a group of college radio stations that combine forces to provide students and Philadelphians with information about upcoming shows around the area. The collective also has a blog that reviews albums and live concerts.

Member schools, along with their radio stations, follow:

- Bryn Mawr College and Haverford College (WHRC)
- La Salle University (WEXP)
- Princeton University (WPRB)
- Saint Joseph's University (WSJR)
- Swarthmore College (WSRN-FM)
- Temple University (WHIP Internet)
- University of Pennsylvania (WQHS)
- Villanova University (WXVU)

The blog is updated frequently. It also features a list of bands formed in Philadelphia as well as a list of DIY venues located in Philadelphia.
