= 2006 United States Senate election in Pennsylvania =

- November 7, 2006
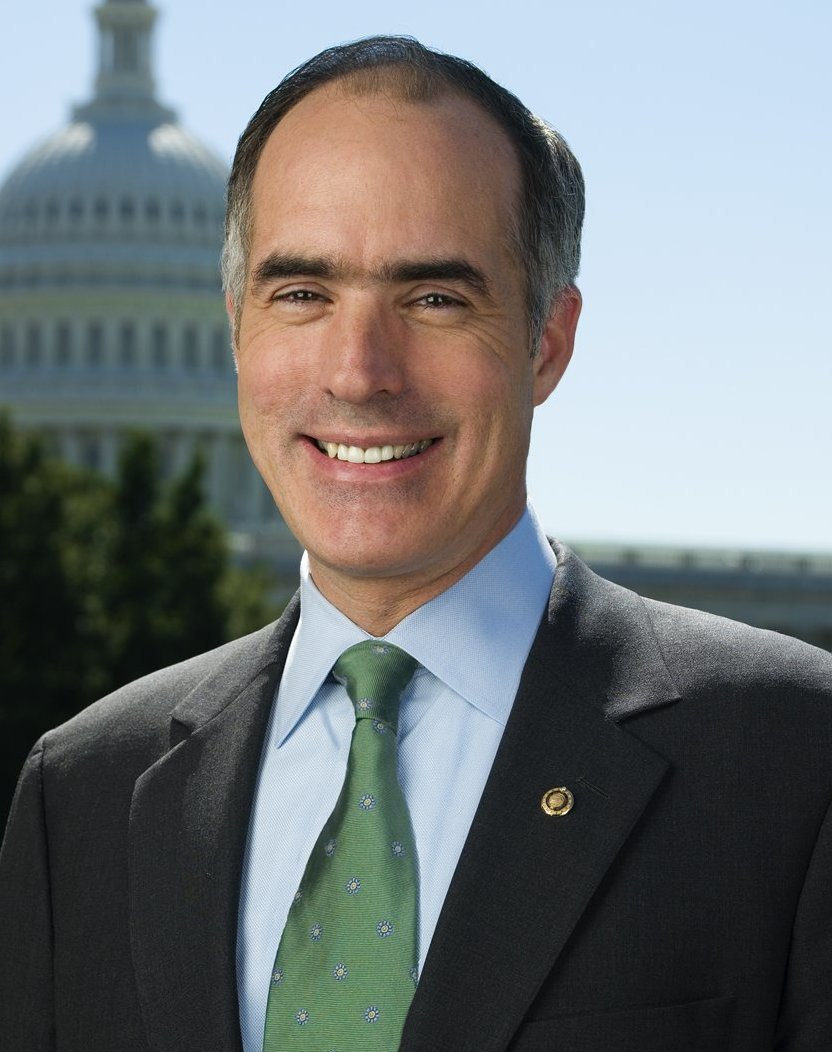

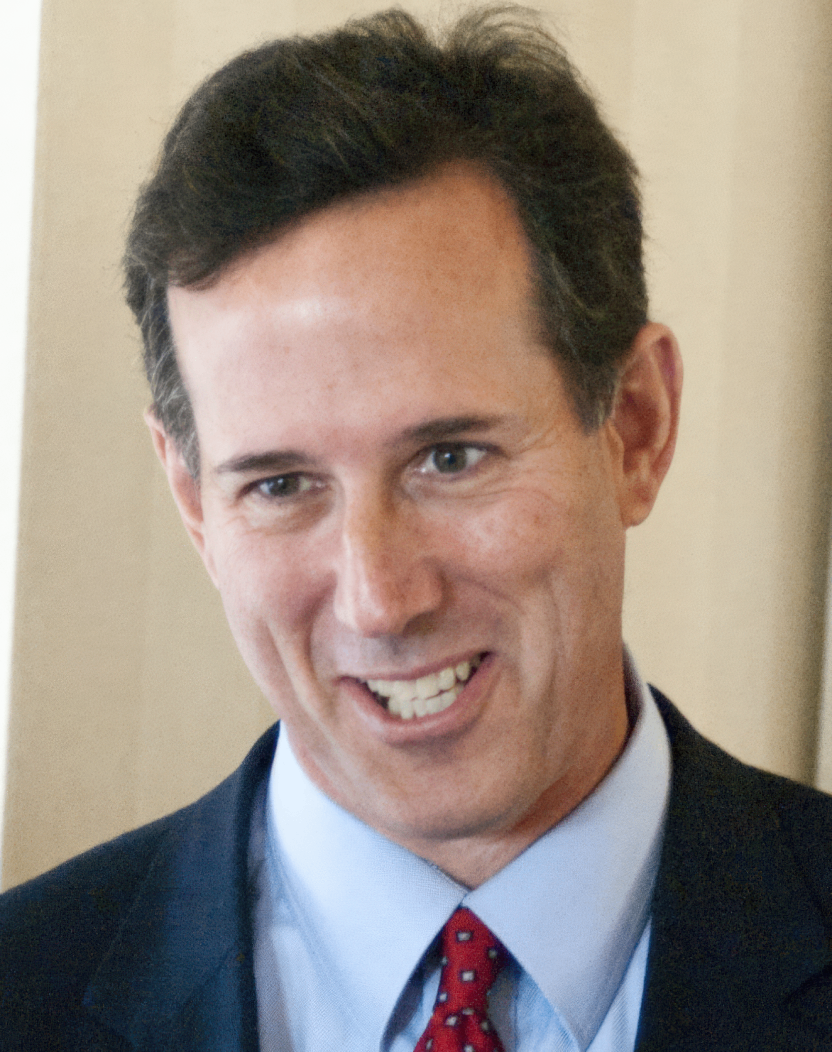
Nominee	Bob Casey Jr.	Rick Santorum
Party	Democratic	Republican
Popular vote	2,392,984	1,684,778
Percentage	58.64%	41.28%
- Casey: 50–60% 60–70% 70–80% 80–90% Santorum: 50–60% 60–70%
U.S. senator before election
Rick Santorum
Republican
Elected U.S. Senator
Bob Casey Jr.
Democratic

The 2006 United States Senate election in Pennsylvania was held on November 7, 2006. Incumbent Republican Rick Santorum ran for re-election to a third term, but was easily defeated by Democratic State Treasurer Bob Casey, Jr., the son of former Governor Bob Casey Sr. Casey was elected to serve between January 3, 2007 and January 3, 2013.

Santorum trailed Casey in every public poll taken during the campaign. Casey's margin of victory (nearly 18% of those who voted) was the largest ever for a Democratic Senate nominee in Pennsylvania, the largest margin of victory for a Senate challenger in the 2006 elections, and the largest general election margin of defeat for an incumbent U.S. senator since 1980. Casey was the first Pennsylvania Democrat to win a full term in the Senate since Joseph S. Clark Jr. in 1962, and the first Democrat to win a Senate election since 1991. He was the first Democrat to win a full term for this seat since 1940.

This was one of the three Republican-held Senate seats up for election in a state that John Kerry won in the 2004 presidential election.

As of 2026, this was the last time the following counties have voted Democratic in a Senate election: Greene, Washington, Westmoreland, Somerset, Lawrence, Mercer, Armstrong, Indiana, Cambria, Warren, Forest, Elk, Clearfield, Clinton, Schuylkill, Columbia, and Carbon. This was also the last time an incumbent senator from Pennsylvania lost a general election until 2024, when Casey was defeated by David McCormick.

== Republican primary ==
=== Candidates ===
==== Nominee ====
- Rick Santorum, incumbent U.S. senator and former U.S. congressman for Pennsylvania's 18th congressional district (1991–1995)

==== Withdrew ====
- John Featherman, Libertarian nominee for U.S. Senate in 2000

Featherman withdrew his candidacy after a Republican party petition challenge because he did not have the necessary number of signatures to get on the ballot. As a result, Santorum won the Republican nomination unopposed.

=== Results ===
2006 Republican U.S. Senate primary
Party	Candidate	Votes	%
Republican	Rick Santorum (incumbent)	561,952	100.00%
Total votes		561,952	100.00%

== Democratic primary ==
The Democratic primary was held May 16, 2006.

=== Candidates ===
==== Nominee ====
- Bob Casey Jr., state treasurer, former state auditor general, candidate for governor in 2002 and son of former Governor Bob Casey, Sr.

==== Eliminated in primary ====
- Chuck Pennacchio, University of the Arts history professor
- Alan Sandals, attorney

==== Declined ====
- Barbara Hafer, former state auditor general and state treasurer
- Joe Hoeffel, U.S. representative

=== Results ===
Casey won a landslide victory in the primary.

2006 Democratic U.S. Senate primary
Party	Candidate	Votes	%
Democratic	Bob Casey, Jr.	629,271	84.48%
Democratic	Chuck Pennacchio	66,364	8.91%
Democratic	Alan Sandals	48,113	6.46%
Write-in		1,114	0.15%
Total votes		744,862	100.00%

== General election ==
=== Candidates ===
- Bob Casey Jr., state treasurer (Democratic)
- Rick Santorum, incumbent U.S. senator (Republican)

==== Declined ====
- Kate Michelman, former president of NARAL Pro-Choice America (Independent)

Michelman decided against running, and tacitly endorsed Casey in March 2006.

==== Disqualified ====
- Carl Romanelli, rail industry consultant (Green)

Romanelli was removed from the ballot by a Commonwealth Court judge on September 25, 2006, following a challenge from Democrats for failing to collect enough valid signatures required of third-party candidates. He lost the appeal to the state Supreme Court challenging the required number of signatures, on October 3, 2006, Romanelli was ordered to pay more than $80,000 in legal fees stemming from his failed effort to make the ballot.

=== Campaign ===
==== Santorum's support for Arlen Specter ====
Republican strategists took Santorum's primary result in 2006 as a bad omen, in which he ran unopposed for the Republican nomination. Republican gubernatorial nominee Lynn Swann, also unopposed, garnered 22,000 more votes statewide than Santorum in the primary, meaning thousands of Republican voters abstained from endorsing Santorum for another Senate term. This may have been partly due to Santorum's support for Arlen Specter over Congressman Pat Toomey in the 2004 Republican primary for the U.S. Senate. Even though Santorum was only slightly less conservative than Toomey, he joined virtually all of the state and national Republican establishment in supporting the moderate Specter. This led many socially and fiscally conservative Republicans to consider Santorum's support of Specter to be a betrayal of their cause. However, Santorum said he supported Specter to avoid risking a Toomey loss in the general election, which would have prevented President George W. Bush's judicial nominees from Senate confirmation. Santorum says Supreme Court Justice Samuel Alito would not have been confirmed without the help of Specter, who was chairman of the Senate Judiciary Committee at the time.

==== Santorum's controversial views ====
In the Senate, Santorum was an outspoken conservative from a state with a history of electing moderates. This led many political commentators to speculate that his low approval ratings were due to some of his more controversial statements and opinions.

Among these controversies were his views on the privatization of Social Security and the teaching of intelligent design in public schools. In addition, his involvement in the Terri Schiavo case was considered by many in his state to be out of place.

All this left Santorum in a precarious position throughout the race. On May 31, 2006, the polling firm Rasmussen Reports declared that Santorum was the "most vulnerable incumbent" among the senators running for re-election. SurveyUSA polling taken right before the election showed that Santorum was the least popular of all 100 senators, with a 38% approval rating and a net approval rating of -19%.

==== Santorum's residency ====
While Santorum maintained a small residence in Penn Hills, a township near Pittsburgh, his family primarily lived in a large house in Leesburg, a suburb of Washington, D.C. in Northern Virginia. Santorum faced charges of hypocrisy from critics who noted the similarities between his living situation and that of former Representative Doug Walgren, who Santorum defeated in 1990. Back then, Santorum had claimed that Walgren was out of touch with his district; these claims were backed up with commercials showing Walgren's home in the Virginia suburbs.

On NBC's Meet the Press on September 3, 2006, Santorum admitted that he only spent "maybe a month a year, something like that" at his Pennsylvania residence.

Santorum also drew criticism for enrolling five of his six children in an online "cyber school" in Pennsylvania's Allegheny County (home to Pittsburgh and most of its suburbs), despite the fact that the children lived in Virginia. The Penn Hills School District was billed $73,000 in tuition for the cyber classes.

==== Casey's momentum ====
Santorum began his contrast campaign against Casey early, charging him with relentlessly seeking higher political office and failing to take definitive stands on issues. While these charges kept the race competitive, in late September and through October, Casey's campaign seemed to regain the momentum it had had throughout most of the campaign, as most polls showed Casey widening his lead after a summer slump. In a Quinnipiac University Polling Institute poll, released on September 26, 2006, Casey was favored by 14 points. An October 18, 2006 poll conducted by Rasmussen Reports showed Casey with a similar double-digit lead. In the Rasmussen poll, only 46% of voters surveyed had a favorable view of Santorum, while 57% of voters viewed Casey favorably.

==== Negative advertisements ====
At least one of Santorum's television ads called into question his campaign's use of the facts regarding Casey and people who had donated money to the Casey campaign. The ad, which aired in September, showed several men seated around a table, while talking amongst themselves and smoking cigars, inside a jail cell. While none of the figures, who were played by actors, were named personally, the narrator provided the job descriptions, previous donations to Casey, and ethical and/or legal troubles of each. The Santorum campaign later provided the names of the people portrayed. An editorial in Casey's hometown newspaper, The Times-Tribune, pointed out that all but one of the contributions "[was] made to Casey campaigns when he was running for other offices, at which time none of the contributors were known to be under investigation for anything." In fact, two of the persons cited in the Santorum campaign ad had actually given contributions to Santorum's 2006 Senate campaign. Another of the figures portrayed had died in 2004. Political scientist Larry Sabato called the ad "over the top" and suspected that the fallout would hurt Santorum.

=== Debates ===
- Complete video of debate, September 3, 2006
- Complete video of debate, October 12, 2006
- Complete video of debate, October 16, 2006

=== Predictions ===
Source	Ranking	As of
The Cook Political Report	Lean D (flip)	November 6, 2006
Sabato's Crystal Ball	Safe D (flip)	November 6, 2006
Rothenberg Political Report	Likely D (flip)	November 6, 2006
Real Clear Politics	Likely D (flip)	November 6, 2006

=== Polling ===
Source	Date	Bob Casey Jr. (D)	Rick Santorum (R)
Quinnipiac	February 16, 2005	46%	41%
SurveyUSA	March 8–9, 2005	49%	42%
Keystone	March 22, 2005	44%	43%
Quinnipiac	April 23, 2005	49%	35%
Keystone	June 6, 2005	44%	37%
Quinnipiac	July 13, 2005	50%	39%
Rasmussen	July 22, 2005	52%	41%
Strategic Vision (R)	July 31, 2005	51%	40%
Strategic Vision (R)	September 12, 2005	52%	38%
Keystone	September 13, 2005	50%	37%
Quinnipiac	October 3, 2005	52%	34%
Strategic Vision (R)	October 16, 2005	52%	36%
Keystone	November 10, 2005	51%	35%
Rasmussen	November 10, 2005	54%	34%
Strategic Vision (R)	November 16, 2005	51%	36%
Quinnipiac	December 13, 2005	50%	38%
Strategic Vision (R)	December 18, 2005	50%	39%
Rasmussen	January 15, 2006	53%	38%
Strategic Vision (R)	January 25, 2006	50%	40%
Keystone	February 9, 2006	50%	39%
Quinnipiac	February 13, 2006	51%	36%
Rasmussen	February 16, 2006	52%	36%
Muhlenberg College	March 2, 2006	49%	37%
Mansfield University	March 7, 2006	45%	31%
Rasmussen	March 14, 2006	48%	38%
Rasmussen	March 29, 2006	50%	41%
Quinnipiac	April 6, 2006	48%	37%
Strategic Vision (R)	April 13, 2006	50%	40%
Rasmussen	April 20, 2006	51%	38%
Muhlenberg/Morning Call	April 26, 2006	46%	38%
Keystone	May 4, 2006	47%	41%
Strategic Vision (R)	May 10, 2006	49%	41%
Quinnipiac	May 11, 2006	49%	36%
Rasmussen	May 22, 2006	56%	33%
American Research Group	May 25, 2006	54%	41%
Strategic Vision (R)	June 15, 2006	49%	40%
Rasmussen	June 19, 2006	52%	37%
Quinnipiac	June 21, 2006	52%	34%
Strategic Vision (R)	July 20, 2006	50%	40%
Rasmussen	July 26, 2006	50%	39%
Muhlenberg College	August 5, 2006	45%	39%
Quinnipiac	August 15, 2006	47%	40%
Benenson Strategy Group (D)	August 16, 2006	51%	37%
Strategic Vision (R)	August 17, 2006	47%	41%
Rasmussen	August 22, 2006	48%	40%
Keystone	August 24, 2006	44%	39%
USA Today/Gallup	August 27, 2006	56%	38%
Keystone	September 18, 2006	45%	38%
Princeton Research Associates	September 18, 2006	52%	31%
Rasmussen	September 20, 2006	49%	39%
Temple/Philadelphia Inquirer	September 24, 2006	49%	39%
Quinnipiac	September 26, 2006	54%	40%
Strategic Vision (R)	September 28, 2006	50%	40%
Mason-Dixon/McClatchy-MSNBC	October 2, 2006	49%	40%
Rasmussen	October 5, 2006	50%	37%
Zogby International/Reuters	October 5, 2006	48%	36%
Muhlenberg/Morning Call	October 8, 2006	46%	41%
Rasmussen	October 16, 2006	55%	43%
Democracy Corps	October 17, 2006	54%	37%
Strategic Vision (R)	October 23, 2006	49%	42%
West Chester University	October 27, 2006	50%	39%
Rasmussen	October 28, 2006	55%	42%
Temple/Philadelphia Inquirer	October 29, 2006	54%	38%
Strategic Vision (R)	October 30, 2006	49%	39%
Quinnipiac	November 1, 2006	52%	42%
Keystone	November 1, 2006	53%	38%
Reuters/Zogby International	November 2, 2006	48%	40%
Muhlenberg/Morning Call	November 3, 2006	51%	43%
Mason-Dixon/McClatchy-MSNBC	November 5, 2006	52%	39%
Strategic Vision (R)	November 6, 2006	52%	40%

=== Results ===
General election results
Party	Candidate	Votes	%	±%
Democratic	Bob Casey Jr.	2,392,984	58.64%	+13.2%
Republican	Rick Santorum (incumbent)	1,684,778	41.28%	−11.1%
Write-in		3,281	0.08%	N/A
Total votes		4,081,043	100.00%	N/A
Democratic gain from Republican				

At 9:45 PM EST on election night, Santorum called Casey to concede defeat.

==== Counties that flipped from Republican to Democratic ====
- Armstrong (largest city: Kittanning)
- Cambria (largest municipality: Johnstown)
- Carbon (largest municipality: Lehighton)
- Clearfield (largest township: DuBois)
- Mercer (largest municipality: Hermitage)
- Clinton (largest city: Lock Haven)
- Columbia (largest city: Bloomsburg)
- Elk (largest city: St. Marys)
- Forest (largest city: Marienville)
- Indiana (largest city: Indiana)
- Schuylkill (largest city: Pottsville)
- Somerset (largest city: Somerset)
- Warren (largest city: Warren)
- Westmoreland (largest township: Hempfield Township)
- Bucks (largest municipality: Bensalem)
- Berks (largest borough: Reading)
- Centre (largest municipality: State College)
- Chester (largest municipality: West Chester)
- Delaware (largest city: Upper Darby)
- Dauphin (largest municipality: Harrisburg)
- Erie (largest municipality: Erie)
- Luzerne (largest municipality: Wilkes-Barre)
- Lehigh (largest municipality: Allentown)
- Monroe (largest borough: Stroudsburg)
- Montgomery (largest city: Lower Merion)
- Northampton (largest municipality: Bethlehem)

==== By congressional district ====
Casey Jr won 14 of 19 congressional districts, including four districts that elected Republicans to the House. Santorum won five districts, including one that elected a Democrat.

District	Casey Jr.	Santorum	Representative
1st	87.7%	12.3%	Bob Brady
2nd	89.6%	10.4%	
2nd	89.6%	10.4%	Chaka Fattah
3rd	54.0%	46.0%	Phil English
4th	54.9%	45.1%	Melissa Hart (109th Congress)
4th	54.9%	45.1%	Jason Altmire (110th Congress)
5th	49.9%	50.1%	John E. Peterson
6th	58.5%	41.5%	Jim Gerlach
7th	59.1%	40.9%	Curt Weldon (109th Congress)
7th	59.1%	40.9%	Joe Sestak (110th Congress)
8th	58.8%	41.2%	Mike Fitzpatrick (109th Congress)
8th	58.8%	41.2%	Patrick Murphy (110th Congress)
9th	44.9%	55.1%	Bill Shuster
10th	49.1%	50.9%	Don Sherwood (109th Congress)
10th	49.1%	50.9%	Chris Carney (110th Congress)
11th	62.3%	37.7%	Paul Kanjorski
12th	62.9%	37.1%	John Murtha
13th	63.0%	37.0%	Allyson Schwartz
14th	76.4%	23.6%	Mike Doyle
15th	56.9%	43.1%	Charlie Dent
16th	45.8%	54.2%	Joe Pitts
17th	51.3%	48.7%	Tim Holden
18th	55.2%	44.8%	Tim Murphy
19th	45.6%	54.4%	Todd R. Platts

== See also ==
- 2006 United States Senate elections
