= Peter Shellem =

American journalist

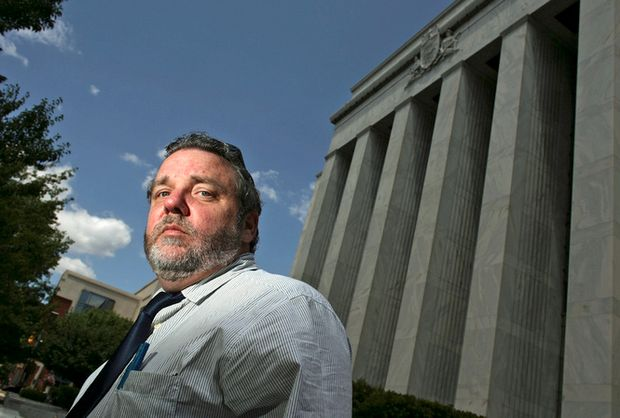
Journalist Peter Shellem

Peter Joseph "Pete" Shellem (October 6, 1960 – October 24, 2009) was a Philadelphia-born investigative reporter for The Patriot-News. He was instrumental in obtaining the release of five wrongfully convicted innocent people:

- Steven Crawford, imprisoned for life in 1970 for murder at age 14, released after 28 years
- Barry Laughman, imprisoned for life in 1988 for rape and murder, released after 15 years
- David Gladden, imprisoned for life in 1995 for murder, released after 12 years
- Patty Carbone, imprisoned for life in 1984 for first-degree murder, released after 14 years after pleading guilty to a reduced charge of third-degree murder
- Jay C. Smith, sentenced to death in 1979 for triple murder, released after 13 years, after the state Supreme Court found that prosecutorial misconduct barred him from being retried on double jeopardy grounds

Shellem's reporting also led to the conviction and imprisonment for mail fraud of the Pennsylvania Attorney General, Ernie Preate in 1995. After serving a year in jail, Preate said of Shellem: "He is a one-man Innocence Project. You've got to recognize the work that he's done and the value he's given to society. He was there when the justice system failed."

On April 16, 2010, Pete Shellem was posthumously awarded "The 2009 Innocence Network Special Lifetime Achievement Award". This event took place at the 2010 Innocence Network Conference, hosted by the Georgia Innocence Project, in Atlanta. His wife, Joyce Shellem, accepted the award in honor of him.

== Death ==
Shellem died on October 24, 2009, in his home town of Gardners, Pennsylvania. His son reported that Shellem died from suicide, but this has not been confirmed.

== Bibliography ==
- Peter Shellem (September 2006), "Wrongful Convictions: Causes, Solutions and Case Studies", in John Douglas; Ann W. Burgess; Allen G. Burgess; Robert K. Ressler (eds.), Crime Classification Manual: A Standard System for Investigating and Classifying Violent Crimes, 2nd Edition, Jossey-Bass, ISBN 978-0-7879-8501-1
- Pete Shellem (28 Jun 2008), "The Killer Next Door: An Analysis of Investigative Journalism", Journal of Forensic Nursing, 2 (3): 134–141, doi:10.1111/j.1939-3938.2006.tb00073.x, PMID 17073061, S2CID 39864887
- Peter Shellem (November 16, 2003), DNA Tests Changing Courtroom Landscape- Procescutors Resists Their Use to Overturn Some Convictions, The Patriot-News
