= Franklin & Marshall College Poll =

Pennsylvania-based opinion poll

The Franklin & Marshall College Poll (formerly the Keystone Poll) is a Pennsylvania-based opinion poll. The poll tracks citizen opinion on politics, public affairs, public policy, and elections in Pennsylvania.

== History ==
The Franklin & Marshall College Poll first developed from a poll taken during the United States Senate special election in Pennsylvania, 1991, pitting incumbent Democrat Harris Wofford against former Pennsylvania governor Dick Thornburgh. In 1992, the poll was formally inaugurated as the Keystone Poll at Millersville University of Pennsylvania, with Terry Madonna working as the director of the poll and Berwood Yost, as the head methodologist. Yost and Madonna took positions at Franklin & Marshall College in Lancaster, Pennsylvania, in 2003, bringing the poll with them. The poll underwent two significant changes in 2008: it was renamed the Franklin & Marshall College Poll and it was expanded beyond its Pennsylvania roots to study national opinion for 29 Hearst-Argyle televisions stations and other media outlets.

During its existence, the poll has been published through a variety of media outlets. In its early years, it was carried by the Philadelphia Daily News and KYW-TV. Later, the Fox 29 replaced KYW and the Harrisburg Patriot News and the Pittsburgh Tribune-Review began carrying the poll. In 2002, the Comcast Network replaced Fox 29. The statewide distribution now includes WPVI-TV, WGAL-TV, WTAE-TV, and the Times-Shamrock Communications.

The Center for Opinion Research at Franklin & Marshall College conducts the F&M Poll. As a department of the college, the Center is both non-profit and non-partisan. The Center is directed by Berwood Yost, who also now directs the F&M Poll, since Terry Madonna has retired. Mr. Yost also works closely with Stephen Medvic, the Honorable and Mrs. John C. Kunkel Professor of Government at F&M, who is the director of F&M’s Center for Politics and Public Affairs.

== See also ==
- Quinnipiac University Polling Institute
- Emerson College Polling
- Suffolk University Political Research Center
- Siena Research Institute
- Monmouth University Polling Institute
- Marist Institute for Public Opinion
