= Larry Ceisler =

- Education: American University; Duquesne University School of Law
- Occupation(s): political consultant, public relations manager

Larry Ceisler is a political operative in Pennsylvania. He runs Ceisler Media & Issue Advocacy.

A native of Washington, Pennsylvania, he is a graduate of American University and Duquesne University School of Law.

He worked as a news producer for KDKA-TV in Pittsburgh and was transferred to KYW-TV in Philadelphia in 1983. In 1986, he left the news business to work as a Deputy Campaign Manager for Philadelphia Mayor Wilson Goode. He then joined the Wilson administration as Special Assistant for Governmental Relations and Special Counsel for the Commerce Department.

He worked as a political analyst for WTXF-TV in Philadelphia from 1999 through 2005. He is also a regular political commentator on KYW-TV, CN8, and the Michael Smerconish Show on WPHT.

He testified in federal court as an expert witness in politics and testified against the GOP-created Pennsylvania redistricting plan.

In 2015, it was announced that Ceisler Media and Issue Advocacy received a contract from the State of Israel. The agreement was a $90,000 test project to help Israel's image in the United States.
