= The Patriot-News =

Newspaper in the Harrisburg, Pennsylvania, metropolitan area

- The front page of The Patriot-News
- Type: Three-times a week newspaper
- Format: Broadsheet
- Owner: Advance Publications
- President: Burke Noel
- Editor: Teresa Bonner
- News editor: Christine Vendel
- Photo editor: Joe Hermitt
- Founded: March 4, 1854 (as The Patriot)
- Headquarters: 1900 Patriot Drive; Mechanicsburg, Pennsylvania, US
- Circulation: 57,258 Daily; 75,159 Sunday (as of 2018)
- Website: PennLive

The Patriot-News is the largest newspaper in Harrisburg–Carlisle metropolitan statistical area in central Pennsylvania, US. In 2005, the newspaper was ranked in the top 100 in daily and Sunday circulation in the United States. It has been owned by Advance Publications since 1947.

On August 28, 2012, the newspaper's publisher announced that it would shift to a three-day print publication schedule beginning January 1, 2013, and expand its digital focus on its website, PennLive.com, and social media platforms. This followed similar moves at other Advance Local-owned publications. It is published Sundays, Tuesdays and Thursdays.

== History ==
=== 19th century ===
The Patriot-News officially traces its history to March 4, 1854, with the founding of The Daily Patriot. Its heritage dates, however, to December 1820, involving a weekly newspaper named The Pennsylvania Intelligencer. In 1855, The Patriot bought the Democratic Union, successor of the Intelligencer, and merged them into The Patriot & Union. It was a weekly paper, but published three days a week when the legislature was in session. It became a daily publication again in 1868 as The Morning Patriot, changing its name to the Harrisburg Daily Patriot in 1875 and dropping Harrisburg from its masthead in 1890. For many years, The Patriot-News was infamous for an editorial printed by its predecessor, The Patriot & Union, on November 24, 1863, in which it dismissed the Gettysburg Address as "silly remarks" that should disappear into "a veil of oblivion."

=== 20th century ===
The other half of the paper began in 1917 as The Evening News. In 1947, both papers were bought by Edwin Russell, with financial backing from the Newhouse chain, forerunner of Advance Publications. Later that year, the Newhouse chain assumed majority ownership, though Russell remained as the papers' driving force until his death in 2001. In 1996, The Patriot and Evening News merged into a single morning paper, The Patriot-News.

From 1953 to 1980, The Patriot and The Evening News were operated alongside south-central Pennsylvania's ABC affiliate, WTPA. That station was sold to Times Mirror with the rest of the Newhouse television division in 1980 and is now WHTM-TV, owned by Nexstar Media Group.

=== 21st century ===
In 2019, The Patriot-News was a founding member of Spotlight PA, an investigative reporting partnership focused on Pennsylvania.

On November 14, 2013, The Patriot-News issued a retraction, saying the Patriot & Union editorial board failed to recognize the "momentous importance, timeless eloquence, and lasting significance" of the Gettysburg Address, and claimed that this failure was so egregious "that it cannot remain unaddressed in our archives." The retraction received considerable national coverage; NPR and Fox News Channel interviewed several of the paper's editors. Deputy opinion page editor Matthew Zencey said the 150th anniversary of the Gettysburg Address was the perfect time to ask, "Gee, can you believe what rock heads ran this outfit 150 years ago?"

== Awards, honors, and special notice ==
Despite its modest size, The Patriot-News has consistently won top state journalism awards in competition with Pennsylvania's largest newspapers. In 2012, Patriot-News reporter Sara Ganim and staff, under the leadership of Editor-In-Chief David Newhouse, were awarded a Pulitzer Prize for breaking the story of the Penn State sex abuse scandal.

In 2003, the paper won the Pennsylvania Newspaper Association’s G. Richard Dew Award for Journalistic Service for its coverage of the attempted sale of Hershey Foods. In 2004, the newspaper was named as one of "10 That Do It Right" by Editor & Publisher magazine. The newspaper has won the Pennsylvania Newspaper Association's Keystone Press Award Division I Sweepstakes, which goes to the large metro newspaper that wins the most journalism awards, in 2004, 2006, and 2010, competing against the newspapers in Philadelphia, Pittsburgh and Allentown as the smallest paper in that division.

The year 2004 also began a run in the Pennsylvania Newspaper Association's Newspaper of the Year Awards unmatched in the contest's history. The Patriot-News has been either first or second place as the state's Newspaper of the Year for seven years in a row, with first-place wins in 2005, 2006, 2007, and 2010. The contest includes more than 50 newspapers from across the state, including Philadelphia and Pittsburgh.

The newspaper's reporters have won the Pennsylvania Newspaper Association's Distinguished Writing Award multiple times, most recently to reporter John Luciew in 2013. The first award went to reporter Jim Lewis in 2001, 2004, and 2005. Reporter Ford Turner won second place in 2008 and first place in 2010.

In 2007, public watchdog reporter Jan Murphy won a First Amendment award from the Associated Press Managing Editors for her stories uncovering profligate spending at PHEAA, the state agency that gives college loans to students. That same year, reporter Ford Turner won the APME's Public Service award for uncovering an unusually high rate of cancer among residents of a small neighborhood of Selinsgrove, Pennsylvania. Murphy also won first prize in investigative reporting from the National Education Writers Association for her stories on PHEAA spending.

The World Association of Newspapers Young Reader Prize for Newspaper in Education in 2007 was awarded to The Patriot-News for its SchoolHouse News program with the Harrisburg School District.

Investigative reporter Pete Shellem, who died in 2009, received widespread recognition for his work in freeing the innocent from prison. Shellem's stories in The Patriot-News resulted in the release of four people who had been convicted of murder: Patty Carbone, who had served 11 years; Steven Crawford, who had served 28 years; Barry Laughman, who had served 16 years; and David Gladden, who had served 12 years. His reporting also freed Charles Dubs, who had served five years on a rape conviction. In The New York Times obituary for Shellem, Barry Scheck, co-director of the Innocence Project at the Benjamin N. Cardozo School of Law at Yeshiva University, called him "a rare, one-man journalism innocence project."

Crime reporter and Penn State grad Sara Ganim began gaining national attention in the wake of the Penn State sex abuse scandal after coach Jerry Sandusky's indictment in November 2011. Ganim had written a substantial piece in March 2011, when few others were covering the story. Among other follow-ups, she then spoke to two of the mothers of alleged victims for the paper in the immediate wake of the indictment. "You can credit the Patriot-News with giving me the time a reporter needs to cover this kind of story," she said to a New York media columnist who specially noted her coverage. Ganim garnered a number of awards and notices for the reporting and, in March 2012, the Scripps Howard Award for Community Journalism. In April 2012, Ganim and the news staff were awarded the 2012 Pulitzer Prize for Local Reporting for the coverage.

== See also ==
- Jan Murphy
- Charlie Thompson
- Peter Shellem
- Sara Ganim
