= Capitolwire =

News service in Pennsylvania, US

CapitolWire
- Type: Digital
- Owner(s): State Affairs, Inc.
- Founded: 1999
- Website: www.capitolwire.com

Capitolwire is a prominent online subscription-based news service focusing on issues relating to politics and government in Pennsylvania. The service is used by lobbyists, trade associations, corporations, state agencies, law firms and individuals in the governmental affairs community.

Capitolwire was founded in 1999 and within its first year, it was reported to have 2,000 subscribers. By 2001, the Capitolwire had more than 35 employees and had expanded its coverage area to include New Jersey, New York, Ohio, and Virginia. The company was sold to the Associated Press in 2002. The AP purchased Capitolwire to expand its practice of licensing material to newspapers. In 2005, Capitolwire was purchased by GovNetPA, Inc.
