= Keystone Press Awards =

- Location: Harrisburg, Pennsylvania
- Country: United States
- Presented by: Pennsylvania Newspaper Association
- Website: http://panewsmedia.org/Events/contest/keystoneprofessional

The Keystone Press Awards are a prominent series of awards presented by the Pennsylvania Newspaper Association to Pennsylvania journalists whose work displays "relevance, integrity and initiative in serving readers, and furthers First Amendment values." Presented annually during the Pennsylvania Press Conference, the awards are distributed among seven circulation size classifications.
