= Pennsylvania NewsMedia Association =

- Founded: 1925
- Founder: John L. Stewart
- Type: trade association
- Location(s): 4000 Crums Mill Road, Suite 101 Harrisburg, PA 17112, Harrisburg, Pennsylvania
- Website: https://panewsmedia.org/

The Pennsylvania NewsMedia Association is a trade group serving newspapers in Pennsylvania. The PNA seeks to "advance the business interests of Pennsylvania news media companies" and protect the "free and independent press." It represents Pennsylvania newsmedia interests in the legislature, provides public educational services, and acts as an information clearinghouse.

== Background ==
It was founded in 1925 as the Pennsylvania Newspaper Publishers Association (PNPA) by John L. Stewart, the publisher of two newspapers in Washington, Pennsylvania.

The name was changed to Pennsylvania Newspaper Association (PNA) in the late 1990s to deemphasize the association's relationship with publishing management. In November 2012, the name was changed to the present Pennsylvania NewsMedia Association (NPA), "to better represent our membership and reflect the media companies that many of our members have already become." It is affiliated with the National Newspaper Association (NNA) and the Newspaper Association of America (NAA).

The organizational structure is threefold, with two other entities complementing the association itself. The PNA Foundation, an independent, non-profit corporation organized as a public foundation, provides PNA members with a wide range of low-cost and innovative training opportunities, typically offering as many as 40 seminars per year and training nearly 800 newspaper staffers in Harrisburg and around the state. Mid-Atlantic Newspaper Services, Inc. (MANSI), the PNA's wholly owned, for-profit subsidiary, sells classified and display advertising into PNA-member newspapers.

== Public advocacy ==
PNA is involved in promoting access to public records in Pennsylvania. The PNA helped advocate for recent changes to Pennsylvania's Freedom of information legislation.

== Awards ==
PNA presents the "Keystone Press Awards" every year during the Keystone Awards Banquet. PNA bestows annual "Newspaper of the Year" awards, among other honors.

When merited, PNA presents the "Bill Northrop Award for distinguished work supporting freedom of information." In 2002, PNA honored retired Publisher Bill Northrop of the Observer Publishing Co. in Washington, Pa. by naming this freedom of information award after him. The first recipients were state Representatives John Maher and Chuck McIlhinney.

The annual Lifetime Achievement Award honors an individual who has "outstanding service and accomplishment spanning a career in journalism".
