= 1985 Pulitzer Prize =

Awards for journalism and related fields

The following are the Pulitzer Prizes for 1985.

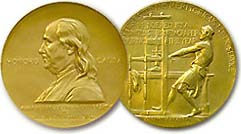
The gold medal awarded for Public Service in Journalism

== Journalism awards ==
- Public Service:
  - The Fort Worth Star-Telegram, For reporting by Mark J. Thompson which revealed that nearly 250 U.S. servicemen had lost their lives as a result of a design problem in helicopters built by Bell Helicopter - a revelation which ultimately led the Army to ground almost 600 Huey helicopters pending their modification.
- General News Reporting:
  - Thomas Turcol of The Virginian-Pilot and The Ledger-Star, for City Hall coverage which exposed the corruption of a local economic development official.
- Investigative Reporting:
  - William K. Marimow of The Philadelphia Inquirer, for his revelation that city police dogs had attacked more than 350 people - an exposé that led to investigations of the K-9 unit and the removal of a dozen officers from it.
- Investigative Reporting:
  - Lucy Morgan and Jack Reed of the St. Petersburg Times, for their thorough reporting on Pasco County Sheriff John Short, which revealed his department's corruption and led to his removal from office by voters.
- Explanatory Journalism:
  - Jon Franklin of The Baltimore Evening Sun, for his seven-part series The Mind Fixers, about the new science of molecular psychiatry.
- Specialized Reporting:
  - Randall Savage and Jackie Crosby of the Macon Telegraph and News, for their in-depth examination of academics and athletics at the University of Georgia and the Georgia Institute of Technology. At 23, Crosby became the youngest ever Pulitzer winner (becoming second youngest after Stephanie Welsh's 1996 win at age 22).
- National reporting:
  - Thomas J. Knudson of the Des Moines Register, for his series of articles that examined the dangers of farming as an occupation.
- International Reporting:
  - Joshua Friedman and Dennis Bell, reporters, and Ozier Muhammad, photographer of Newsday, for their series on the plight of the hungry in Africa.
- Feature Writing:
  - Alice Steinbach of The Baltimore Sun, for her account of a blind boy's world, A Boy of Unusual Vision.
- Commentary:
  - Murray Kempton of Newsday, for witty and insightful reflection on public issues in 1984 and throughout a distinguished career.
- Criticism:
  - Howard Rosenberg of the Los Angeles Times, for his television criticism.
- Editorial Writing:
  - Richard Aregood of the Philadelphia Daily News, for his editorials on a variety of subjects.
- Editorial Cartooning:
  - Jeff MacNelly of the Chicago Tribune.
- Spot News Photography:
  - Photography Staff of Register, for their exceptional coverage of the Olympic games.
- Feature Photography:
  - Larry C. Price of The Philadelphia Inquirer, for his series of photographs from Angola and El Salvador depicting their war-torn inhabitants.
- Feature Photography:
  - Stan Grossfeld of The Boston Globe, for his series of photographs of the famine in Ethiopia and for his pictures of illegal aliens on the Mexican border.

== Letters, Drama and Music Awards ==
- Fiction:
  - Foreign Affairs by Alison Lurie (Random House)
- Drama:
  - Sunday in the Park with George Music and lyrics by Stephen Sondheim, book by James Lapine (Dodd, Mead)
- History:
  - Prophets of Regulation by Thomas K. McCraw (Belknap/Harvard)
- Biography or Autobiography:
  - The Life and Times of Cotton Mather by Kenneth Silverman (Harper & Row)
- Poetry:
  - Yin by Carolyn Kizer (BOA Editions)
- General Nonfiction:
  - "The Good War": An Oral History of World War II by Studs Terkel (Pantheon)
- Music:
  - Symphony No. 1 RiverRun by Stephen Albert (G. Schirmer)
    Premiered by the National Symphony Orchestra on January 17, 1985.

== Special Citations and Awards ==
- Special Awards and Citations - Music:
  - William Schuman, a special citation to William Schuman for more than half a century of contribution to American music as composer and educational leader.
