= Sara Ganim =

American journalist (born 1987)

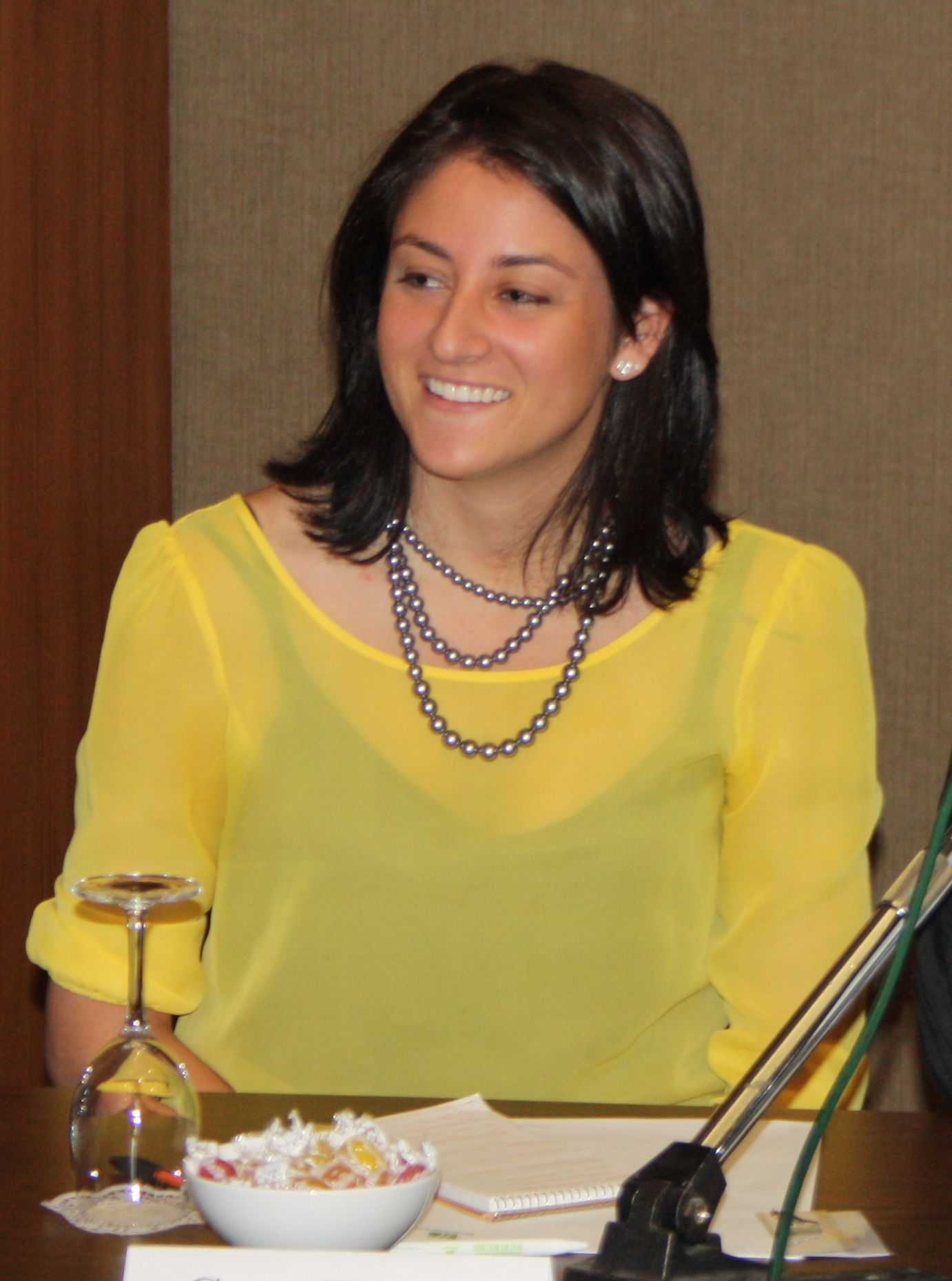
- Ganim in 2012
- Born: Sara Elizabeth Ganim; September 9, 1987 (age 39); Detroit, Michigan, U.S.
- Education: Pennsylvania State University (2008)
- Occupation: Journalist
- Years active: 2003–present
- Employer(s): CNN (2012–2019); The Patriot-News (2011–2012); Centre Daily Times (2007–2010)
- Spouse: Danny Cevallos
- Awards: George Polk Award in Journalism (2011); Sidney Award (2012); Pulitzer Prize (2012)

Sara Elizabeth Ganim (born September 9, 1987) is an American journalist and podcast host. She is the current Hearst Journalism Fellow at the University of Florida's Brechner Center for Freedom of Information and the James Madison Visiting Professor on First Amendment Issues at the Columbia Journalism School. Previously, she was a correspondent for CNN. In 2011 and 2012, she was a reporter for The Patriot-News, a daily newspaper in Harrisburg, Pennsylvania. There she broke the story that featured the Sandusky scandal and the Second Mile charity. For the Sandusky/Penn State coverage, "Sara Ganim and members of The Patriot-News Staff" won a number of national awards including the 2012 Pulitzer Prize for Local Reporting, making Ganim the third-youngest winner of a Pulitzer. The award cited "courageously revealing and adeptly covering the explosive Sandusky sex scandal involving former football coach Jerry Sandusky."

== Early years ==
Born in Detroit, Ganim grew up in Coral Springs, Florida. In 2005, Ganim graduated from Archbishop McCarthy High School; she was a freelance reporter for the Sun Sentinel when in high school. She is a 2008 graduate of Pennsylvania State University, where she majored in Journalism. Ganim is of Lebanese and German descent.

== Career ==
Ganim began her career in high school as a contributor to the South Florida Sun-Sentinel and later wrote for the Daily Collegian at Penn State before interning for The Associated Press, Beginning in 2007, Ganim worked for the Centre Daily Times, a daily newspaper based in State College, Pennsylvania near the University Park campus of Penn State. At the Daily Times she generated her initial lead for the story of child abuse accusations against former Penn State football coach Jerry Sandusky and also won several state journalism awards. She joined The Patriot-News staff in January 2011. On March 31, 2011, The Patriot-News published an article written by the newspaper's lawyers based on Ganim's reporting that a grand jury was investigating child sex abuse accusations against Sandusky. By November 2011, the grand jury indicted Sandusky and the story became a major scandal for Penn State.

In November 2012, she left The Patriot-News to become a full-time correspondent for CNN. On January 8, 2014, Ganim wrote a story for CNN claiming that some student-athletes at NCAA Division I member colleges and universities read at a third-grade level or below. The article focused attention on several different schools, and included University of North Carolina at Chapel Hill (UNC), attributing the UNC information to the findings of learning specialist Mary Willingham, who worked at the university. UNC later issued a statement that this research was "severely flawed." The NCAA also disputed Ganim's portrayal of the academic qualifications of college athletes in the article, stating "the hard facts and cold truth simply do not bear out the scenario portrayed in [her] reporting." In response, Willingham said that her "data is 100% correct." On April 11, 2014, UNC released independent expert studies which reviewed the data and disputed Willingham's claims, concluding that "[a] recent CNN articled stated, "60% [of UNC athletes] read between fourth- and eighth-grade levels. Between 8% and 10% read below a third-grade level." Rather than 60% of UNC student-athletes possessing a 4th- to 8th-grade reading level, only 6% of student-athletes read at such level." In May 2014, New York Times columnist cited the CNN report in telling the story of Willingham as a whistleblower. The coverage led UNC to ask for a seventh review of the scandal at UNC, led by former federal prosecutor Ken Wainstein, which found that UNC had downplayed an academic scandal there. However, the NCAA ultimately could not establish that UNC had committed violations punishable under NCAA rules and UNC received no penalties.

Since July 2019, Ganim has been associated with the University of Florida College of Journalism, where she is the current Hearst Journalism Fellow at the Brechner Center for Freedom of Information. She also hosts the Brechner Center's podcast "Why We Don't Know." In 2020, she wrote and directed "No Defense: The U.S. Military's War on Water", a documentary film about PFAS contamination from U.S. military bases. In 2021, she was a Spencer Fellow at Columbia Journalism School. In 2022, she hosted the podcast "The Mayor of Maple Avenue", telling the story of one of Jerry Sandusky's victims. Since July 2022, Ganim has been the James Madison Visiting Professor on First Amendment Issues at Columbia Journalism School. In 2023, she hosted the podcast "Believable: The Coco Berthmann Story."

== Awards and recognition ==
For the Jerry Sandusky child sexual abuse case work, Ganim gained early attention as the scandal broadened. MarketWatch journalism columnist Jon Friedman wrote of her as "the star reporter" on the scandal in November, 2011. Friedman added that Kim Jones, reporting at Penn State for WFAN, "also mentioned Ganim's stellar work" and that Jason McIntyre of the sports blog The Big Lead among others had been singling out Ganim—and her P-N colleague Ben Jones, in McIntyre's case—on Twitter.

Considerable other attention and professional awards also were given. In February, 2012, Ganim became the youngest person ever, at age 24, to receive the Sidney Award for socially conscious journalism. In February 2012, Long Island University announced that she had won a prestigious George Polk Award in Journalism in 2011 for her coverage of the story. Newsweek magazine named her one of "150 Women Who Shake the World" in March, 2012, and it was announced that Ganim and The Patriot-News would receive the Scripps Howard Award for Community Journalism, again for the Sandusky/Penn State coverage.

In April 2012, then-24-year-old Ganim became the third-youngest person (Jackie Crosby won at 22, Stephanie Welsh at 23) to win a Pulitzer Prize. For her UNC coverage, Ganim won a 2015 Sigma Delta Chi Award from the Society of Professional Journalists. While a print journalist, she received recognition for a body of work that impacted the local communities she covered and for explanation journalism, including a Pennsylvania Bar Association Award, and several Pennsylvania state awards for multimedia reporting and storytelling.

In 2012, she was recognized by the Associated Press Managing Editors association for her work with student journalists. Ganim has taught college-level journalism and spends several days each year speaking to college and high school journalists about the profession of journalism and the transition from print to broadcast. In May 2015, she delivered the commencement address to graduates of the American University in Dubai. In 2015, she was given the Philip Habib Award for Distinguished Public Service by the American Task Force for Lebanon. In 2021, the podcast "Why We Don't Know" won first place in the Public Service category of the 2020 Educational Writers Association national journalism awards.

== In popular culture ==
In the HBO movie Paterno, Ganim, who served as a consultant on the film, was played by Riley Keough.
