= Brian Donovan =

Brian Donovan may refer to:

- Brian O'Donovan, TV journalist
- Brian Donovan (actor), American voice actor
- Brian Donovan (journalist) (died 2018), American journalist
