= Paterno (film) =

2018 film

- Television release poster
- Genre: Drama
- Screenplay by: Debora Cahn; John C. Richards
- Directed by: Barry Levinson
- Starring: Al Pacino; Riley Keough; Kathy Baker; Greg Grunberg; Annie Parisse
- Music by: Evgueni Galperine; Sacha Galperine
- Country of origin: United States
- Original language: English

Production
- Executive producers: Barry Levinson; Jason Sosnoff; Edward R. Pressman; Rick Nicita; Lindsay Sloane
- Producer: Amy Herman
- Cinematography: Marcell Rév
- Editors: Ron Patane; Brad Turner
- Running time: 105 minutes
- Production companies: HBO Films; Levinson/Fontana; Sony Pictures Television; Edward R. Pressman Film

Original release
- Network: HBO
- Release: April 7, 2018

Paterno is a 2018 American television drama film directed by Barry Levinson. It stars Al Pacino as former Penn State football coach Joe Paterno, and his career leading up to his dismissal following the university's child sex abuse scandal in 2011. Riley Keough, Kathy Baker, Greg Grunberg and Annie Parisse also star. The film premiered on HBO on April 7, 2018.

== Plot ==
On October 29, 2011, Joe Paterno wins his 409th game as head coach of the Penn State Nittany Lions football team. During 61 years at Penn State University, he helped the former "cow college" to quintuple its financial endowment and build Paterno Library. At age 84, Paterno is so beloved as "a coach, an educator, and a humanitarian" that a statue is erected outside of Beaver Stadium, and so powerful that when university president Graham Spanier and athletic director Tim Curley ask Paterno to retire in 2005, he refuses. Inside the stadium, Spanier, Curley and vice president Gary Schultz worry about a grand jury that is investigating accusations of child sexual abuse against Jerry Sandusky, a retired assistant coach.

Six days after Penn State defeats Illinois, The Patriot-News reporter Sara Ganim learns that the grand jury's presentment also indicts Curley and Schultz. Although he is so traumatized by the abuse that he suffered that he does not want his mother to read the presentment, high school student Aaron Fisher, known in Ganim's articles as "Victim 1", is the first to publicly testify against Sandusky. Rumors spread about "Victim 1"'s identity, and Fisher is attacked at school by other students, but his psychologist tells Ganim that Fisher and his mother repeated his story to many skeptical people to protect other children. Ganim and her editor discuss other allegations against Sandusky from 1998 and beyond, such as the rape of a young boy at the 1999 Alamo Bowl. They realize that the university has protected him for years.

Paterno's wife Sue and their adult children, including assistant coach Jay and lawyer Scott, are horrified by the accusations against Sandusky. They want to help the elderly Paterno but do not understand why he continues to prepare for the upcoming game against Nebraska instead of reading the presentment. As reporters besiege Paterno's home, the coach tells his family that when a distraught Mike McQueary told him in 2001 about seeing Sandusky sexually assaulting a young boy in the men's shower room on campus, he did his legal duty by telling Curley and Schultz. Paterno says that Sandusky's The Second Mile charity helped many children. Mary Kay Paterno asks her father why he waited two days to report McQueary's account—"You hear about someone diddling my kids? Don't wait the weekend!"—and whether he followed up on his report.

Penn State students gather at Paterno's home to support the coach, who announces that he will resign as head coach after the football season. John Surma and others on the university board of trustees, however, force Spanier to resign and fire Paterno during a phone call. Ganim reports on a riot by students who denounce the media and cheer for Paterno. Sue and Joe Paterno discuss a Sugar Bowl during the 1970s, at which Sandusky played with their young children at a hotel pool while Paterno was preparing for the game. She presumes that her husband would not have let Sandusky do so had he known that he was a pedophile; he tells her, "I was working. I wasn't focused on the goddamn pool." That night, however, he has a nightmare about the memory. Not on the sidelines for the first time since 1965, Paterno watches on television as Nebraska defeats Penn State.

Paterno is diagnosed with terminal lung cancer. Driving past the stadium after undergoing an MRI, he sees people next to the statue arguing about his legacy. Another alleged victim tells Ganim that he told Paterno that Sandusky abused him in 1976.

== Cast ==
- Al Pacino as Joe Paterno
- Riley Keough as Sara Ganim
- Kathy Baker as Sue Paterno
- Greg Grunberg as Scott Paterno
- Annie Parisse as Mary Kay Paterno
- Ben Cook as Aaron Fisher
- Jim Johnson as Jerry Sandusky
- Peter Jacobson as David Newhouse
- Larry Mitchell as Jay Paterno
- Darren Goldstein as Mike McQueary
- Kristen Bush as Dawn Fisher
- Sean Cullen as Dan McGinn
- Steve Coulter as Tim Curley
- Tom Kemp as Graham Spanier
- William Hill as Tom Bradley
- Michael Mastro as Guido D'Elia
- Josh Mowrey as Ron Vanderlinden
- Murphy Guyer as Gary Schultz

== Production ==
On September 8, 2012, it was reported that ICM Partners would take a package for a film about Joe Paterno starring Al Pacino as Paterno. On January 16, 2013, it was reported that Brian De Palma would direct the film, which would be titled Happy Valley. De Palma envisioned the story as a character piece of Paterno:

"[Happy Valley will be] the descent into hell of a man whose past was exemplary: a fascinating story, worthy of [Henrik] Ibsen or Arthur Miller. It could breathe fresh air into Hollywood today, which is busy squandering millions on big-screen comics, toy films and new Batman series..."

HBO subsequently picked up the film, but on September 19, 2014, it was reported that the network had suspended pre-production on the project due to budget issues. On June 5, 2017, it was reported that the film was once again moving forward, with Pacino starring and Barry Levinson directing. In June 2017, Riley Keough, Kathy Baker and Greg Grunberg joined the cast. On July 10, 2017, Annie Parisse joined the cast. On July 16, 2017, it was reported that the film had begun production.

== Music ==
The music is composed by Evgueni Galperine and Sacha Galperine, who recently worked with Barry Levinson in The Wizard of Lies. The score has been released at Lakeshore Records.

== Reception ==
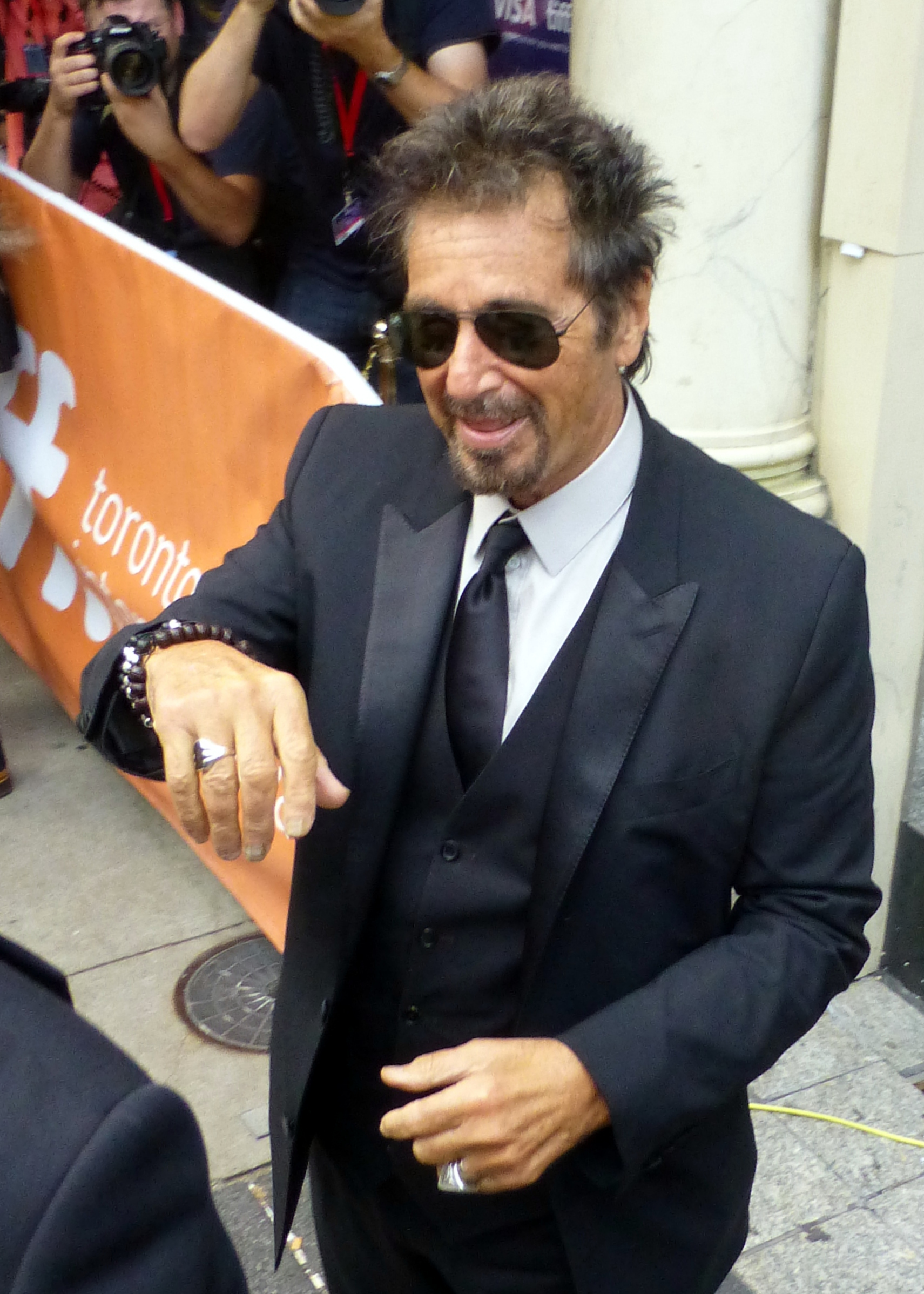
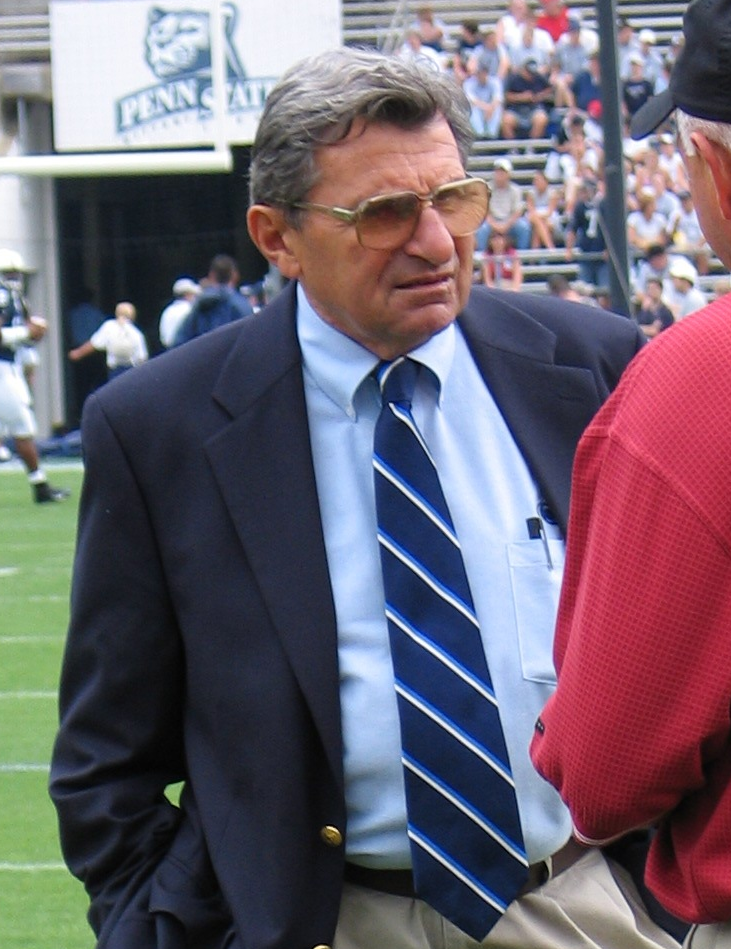
Pacino (left) portrayed Paterno, for which he received critical praise.

Paterno was met with a generally positive response from critics. On review aggregator website Rotten Tomatoes, the film holds an approval rating of 69%, based on 39 reviews, with an average rating of 7.2/10. The website's critical consensus reads: "Paterno, elevated by deft direction from Barry Levinson and a strong Al Pacino performance, presents a hard-hitting dramatization of a gut-wrenching real-life story." Metacritic, which uses a weighted average, assigned the film a score of 69 out of 100, based on 19 critics, indicating "generally favorable" reviews.

Ben Travers of IndieWire gave the film a grade of "A−" (on a scale of A+ to F) and praised Pacino's performance, saying, "Pacino's Paterno is at once wracked with guilt and oblivious to any misdeeds. He's a figure of sympathy and disgust. Pacino constructs the man along with the movie, both timing his subtle tips to critical scenes... and adeptly downshifting as his stature dips from a myth to a man."

IGN gave the film a 6.7, or "Okay", rating, saying that the film "doesn't answer the lingering questions about the once beloved college football coach, provide any insight into the scandal, or offer a means of evoking empathy for those affected".

The film drew criticism from 300 of Paterno's former players, who signed a letter in protest of the film's portrayal of the former Penn State coach. However, near the time of the film's release, The Patriot-News, in its online edition at PennLive, evaluated the film's accuracy and found it to be accurate, although noted that it used artistic license in its presentation of the known facts ("...the deep dive into the conscience of Joe Paterno is something that appears to have been pure dramatic license"). This was also backed up by David Newhouse, who reviewed the film's script during production and had no changes to suggest, although he added that it utilized "Hollywood storytelling".

The British newspaper The Guardian described the film's retelling of the Sandusky scandal as "messy".

=== Accolades ===
Year	Award	Category	Nominee(s)	Result	Ref.
2018	Gold Derby TV Awards	TV movie		Nominated	
2018	Online Film & Television Association Awards	Best Motion Picture		Nominated	
2018	Primetime Emmy Awards	Outstanding Directing for a Limited Series, Movie or Dramatic Special	Barry Levinson	Nominated	
2018	Primetime Creative Arts Emmy Awards	Outstanding Television Movie	Barry Levinson, Jason Sosnoff, Tom Fontana, Edward R. Pressman, Rick Nicita, Lindsay Sloane, and Amy Herman	Nominated	
2019	Artios Awards	Outstanding Achievement in Casting – Film – Non-Theatrical Release	Ellen Chenoweth and Susanne Scheel	Won	
2019	Directors Guild of America Awards	Outstanding Directorial Achievement in Movies for Television and Miniseries	Barry Levinson	Nominated	
2019	Producers Guild of America Awards	David L. Wolper Award for Outstanding Producer of Long-Form Television	Barry Levinson, Jason Sosnoff, Tom Fontana, Edward R. Pressman, Rick Nicita, Lindsay Sloane, and Amy Herman	Nominated	
2019	Writers Guild of America Awards	Long Form – Original	Debora Cahn and John C. Richards	Nominated	
