= Aaron Fisher =

Aaron Fisher may refer to:

- Aaron Fisher, identified as "Victim 1" in the Penn State child sex abuse scandal; see Silent No More
- Aaron R. Fisher (1892–1985), U.S. Army officer

== See also ==
- Aaron Fischer, the "Captain America of the Railways", a character in Marvel Comics
