= Jen Mazza =

American visual artist

- Born: 1972 (age 53–54); Washington D.C
- Education: Rutgers University
- Occupations: Visual Artist, Educator
- Known for: Painting, Mixed Media
- Website: https://jenmazza.com/

Jen Mazza (born 1972) is a New York City based contemporary artist, writer, and educator. Her practice draws on a multitude of disciplines, including philosophy, literature, and visual culture.

== Early life and education ==
Born in Washington, D.C., Mazza received her B.A. in Visual Art and Spanish Literature from the University of Mary Washington in Fredericksburg, Virginia before pursuing her M.F.A in Visual Art from Mason Gross School of the Arts at Rutgers University in 2001.

== Career ==
Not long after graduating with her M.F.A in 2001, Mazza had her debut solo exhibition, Auricle, at PS122 in 2002. By 2014, Mazza was represented by Tibor de Nagy Gallery, with her first solo show Graft. She went on to have 2 additional solo shows and 1 group exhibition with this gallery. After her final solo show in 2020, Mazza left Tibor de Nagy and is now represented by Ulterior Gallery. Mazza has had two group exhibitions and one solo exhibition with Ulterior.

Her latest exhibition, Vicissitudes of Nature, on view at Ulterior Gallery from January 10, 2025, to February 22, 2025, included a series of works that were drawn from historical images and texts. Mazza references several sources in the exhibition, including Virginia Woolf, Abraham Ortelius, and John Ruskin. According to the press release for the exhibition, the title of the show was a tribute to philosopher Richard J. Bernstein who wrote about the quest for a fixed point. The work in the show included paintings, drawings, and sculptures that absorb the viewer, leaving them looking for that fixed point, somewhere they can ground themselves. The centerpiece for this exhibition was a large-scale painting titled Portent, which was lifted from a Titian woodcut from 1515.

Jen Mazza is currently an adjunct associate Professor at Pratt Institute and a Part-time Assistant Professor at The New School Parsons. Her classes include, but are not limited to, Integrative Studio 2, Thesis Statement 1, and Fine Arts Seminar III: Modes of Critique.

== Critical reception ==
Mazza's work has been written about in the New York Times, Hyperallergic, Art in America, and several other publications.

=== Press ===
"Three Short Takes on Exhibitions in New York" by John Mendelsohn, Dart International Magazine, January 31, 2025.

"Jen Mazza's narrative interplay" by Michael Brennan, Two Coats of Paint, January, 2025.

"Sites of Knowledge" review, by Zachary Sachs, Artforum, June 30, 2017.

"Summer Carousing and Revelry", by John Yau, Hyperallergic, July 3, 2016.

"Objecty", review by Julia Wolkoff, Art in America, June 2016.

"Upstairs and Behind Doors, Creative Passion", by Roberta Smith, The New York Times, April 3, 2014.

== Exhibition history ==
=== Recent Solo Exhibitions ===
- Vicissitudes of Nature, Ulterior Gallery, New York, NY. January 10—February 22, 2025.
- Attending to Particulars, Tibor de Nagy Gallery, New York, NY. February 20 – March 29, 2020.
- No Subjects Where None Intended, C.G.Boerner, New York, NY. January 25 - March 1, 2019.
- Disobedience is not careless, James Gallery at the Graduate Center, CUNY, New York, NY. September 12 - December 15, 2018.
- \ /\/\/\/\/\ /\\\\\\\\\///////////\ A Painting is a Machine, Tibor de Nagy Gallery, New York, NY. October 22 – December 5, 2015.
- Graft, Tibor de Nagy Gallery, New York, NY. February 27 – April 12, 2014.

=== Residencies ===
- 2013: Residency, Millay Colony for the Arts, Austerlitz, NY.
- 2008: Artist in Residency, Newark Museum, Newark, NJ. Residency, The Jentel Foundation, Banner, WY.
- 2004-2006: Residency, Blue Mountain Center, Blue Mountain Lake, NY. Geraldine R. Dodge Residency, Virginia Center for the Creative Arts, Amherst, VA.
- 2005: Geraldine R. Dodge Residency, Yaddo, Saratoga Spring, NY.
- 2004: Residency, The Jentel Foundation, Banner, WY. Residency, Millay Colony for the Arts, Austerlitz, NY.

== Selected publications ==
Contributor to: "Post-pandemic Pedagogy in Studio Art Education," Teachers College Press.

"Like Driving at Night: A Process-Based, Learner-Centered Approach to Teaching Artistic Research Across Disciplines" (written in collaboration with social practice artist Dylan Gauthier), "Teaching Artistic Research," (De Gruyter, 2019).

"A Week in Late Capitalism / Ancient Capitalistic Proverbs"(Blush) a chapbook written by poet Sampson Starkweather with images by Jen Mazza.

"10 White Lies and Poem of the End," artist book.

"Senzaporta," artist book.

"An Imperfect Mirror," artist book.
