= Daniel Breazeale =

American philosopher

- Born: Daniel James Breazeale; 25 January 1945; Houston, Texas, U.S.
- Died: 30 December 2023 (aged 78); Lexington, Kentucky, U.S.

Education
- Education: Austin College (BA); Yale University (PhD)
- Thesis: Toward a Nihilist Epistemology: Hume and Nietzsche (1971)
- Doctoral advisor: John E. Smith
- Other advisors: Kenley R. Dove, Karsten Harries, Charles W. Hendel

Philosophical work
- Era: Contemporary philosophy
- Region: Western philosophy
- School: German idealism
- Institutions: University of Kentucky
- Main interests: German philosophy

Daniel James Breazeale (/ˈbriːziːl/; 25 January 1945 – December 30, 2023) was an American philosopher and Professor of Philosophy at the University of Kentucky. He is known for his works on German philosophy and J. G. Fichte.

== Books ==
- Friedrich Nietzsche, Philosophy and Truth: Selections from Nietzsche's Notebooks of the Early 1870s, ed. and trans. Daniel Breazeale, Humanities Press, 1979, ISBN 039100686X.
- Daniel Breazeale and Tom Rockmore (eds.), New Essays on Fichte's Later Jena Wissenschaftslehre, Northwestern University Press, 2002, ISBN 0810118653.
- Johann Gottlieb Fichte, System of Ethics, trans. Günter Zöller and Daniel Breazeale, Cambridge University Press, 2005, ISBN 0521577675.
- Daniel Breazeale, Thinking Through the Wissenschaftslehre: Themes from Fichte's Early Philosophy, Oxford University Press, 2013, ISBN 9780199233632.
- Tom Rockmore and Daniel Breazeale (eds.), Fichte and Transcendental Philosophy, Palgrave Macmillan, 2014, ISBN 9781137412225.
- Daniel Breazeale and Tom Rockmore (eds.), Fichte's Addresses to the German Nation Reconsidered, State University of New York Press, 2016, ISBN 9781438462554.
- Johann Gottlieb Fichte, Foundation of the Entire Wissenschaftslehre and Related Writings (1794–95), ed. and trans. Daniel Breazeale, Oxford University Press, 2021, ISBN 9780198842903.
