= Mark Thompson (reporter) =

American investigative reporter (born 1953)

- Born: 1953 (age 71–72); New Haven, Connecticut, U.S.
- Education: Boston University (BA)
- Spouse: Diane
- Children: 2

Mark Thompson (born 1953) is an American investigative reporter whose work for the Fort Worth Star-Telegram was recognized with the 1985 Pulitzer Prize for Public Service.

== Biography ==
Thompson graduated from Boston University College of Communication in 1975 and began his career where he grew up, at the Pendulum, in East Greenwich, Rhode Island. After a spell in Pontiac, Michigan, he moved to Washington in 1979, and joined the Washington bureau of the Fort Worth Star-Telegram. The newspaper received the Pulitzer Prize for Public Service for a five-part series by Thompson that was published in March 1984. Thompson covered, or uncovered, a design flaw in Bell helicopters that went uncorrected for a decade and led to the deaths of 250 U.S. servicemen; in consequence of his work, 600 Huey helicopters were grounded and modified. He joined Knight-Ridder Newspapers in 1986, where he reported extensively on the Persian Gulf War and the U.S. invasion of Panama.

In 1994, Thompson joined Time magazine as national-security correspondent, focusing on the challenges facing the post-Cold War U.S. military. Following the terror attacks of September 11, 2001, he charted the resulting profound changes in U.S. military policy, and the impact of those changes on the men and women waging the wars in Afghanistan and Iraq. He retired from Time in 2016 and now writes about military matters for the non-partisan Project on Government Oversight in Washington, D.C.
