= Avrum Stroll =

American philosopher

Avrum Stroll (February 15, 1921 – September 12, 2013) was an American research professor at the University of California, San Diego. Born in Oakland, California, he was a distinguished philosopher and a noted scholar in the fields of epistemology, philosophy of language, and twentieth-century analytic philosophy.

== Publications ==
=== Books ===
- The Emotive Theory of Ethics. University of California Press, 1954
- Introduction to Philosophy. Holt, Rinehart and Winston, 1961 (1972, 1979)
- Epistemology. Harper & Row, 1967 (Greenwood Press, 1979)
- Philosophy and the Human Spirit. Holt, Rinehart and Winston, 1973
- Philosophy and Contemporary Problems. Richard H. Popkin, Avrum Stroll, Holt Rinehart & Winston, February 1984
- Surfaces. University of Minnesota Press, 1988
- Philosophy Made Simple by Richard H. Popkin, Avrum Stroll, Made Simple Books, September 8, 1986 (1993), Paperback
- Moore and Wittgenstein on Certainty. Oxford University Press, 1994
- Introductory Readings In Philosophy. Avrum Stroll, Richard H. Popkin. Harcourt Brace* Co, November 1997
- Skeptical Philosophy for Everyone. Richard H. Popkin, Avrum Stroll. Prometheus Books, January 2002, Hardcover
- Wittgenstein (Oneworld Philosophers). Oneworld Publications, July 2002 (2007)
- Did My Genes Make Me Do It? Oneworld Publications, August 25, 2004, Hardcover
- Sketches of Landscapes. The MIT Press, December 5, 1997, Hardcover
- Twentieth-Century Analytic Philosophy. Columbia University Press, September 15, 2001, Paperback
- Philosophy. Richard H. Popkin, Avrum Stroll
- Much Ado about Nonexistence. A.P. Martinich, Avrum Stroll. Rowman & Littlefield Publishers, Inc., June 28, 2007 Hardcover
- Informal Philosophy. Rowman & Littlefield Publishers, 2009

=== Articles ===
- Proper Names, Names, and Fictive Objects, The Journal of Philosophy, Vol. 95, No. 10 (Oct., 1998), pp. 522–534
- Wittgenstein and the Dream Hypothesis. Philosophia 37 (4)
