= Hard Driving: The Wendell Scott Story =

2008 biography by Brian Donovan

- Author: Brian Donovan
- Language: English
- Genre: Biography
- Publisher: Steerforth Press
- Publication date: 2008
- Publication place: United States
- Media type: Print
- Pages: 311
- ISBN: 978-1-58642-144-1
- Dewey Decimal: 796.72092

Hard Driving: The Wendell Scott Story is a 2008 biography written by Brian Donovan about the life of NASCAR driver Wendell Scott, one of the first ever black drivers in NASCAR Cup Series history and the first ever black driver to win a race. Scott, the subject of the book, is shown facing numerous challenges of racial segregation, racism, possible match fixing, being banned from tracks, to have the lifestyle he wanted: to race out on the track.

A second edition of the book was released on August 3, 2021.

== Plot ==
The book consists of stories detailing the timeline of Scott's life, NASCAR career, and the struggles he had growing up as a black man.

Scott was born in Danville, Virginia on August 29, 1921. His early childhood consisted of many struggles, including his parents divorcing due to clashing personalities and experiencing segregation. Throughout his life, he had promised himself to always "be his own boss", wanting to avoid an average job at a textile mill.

After buying a Ford Model T, he would become a mechanic and land a job at the local taxi company. During his span at the Danville Taxi Company, he would meet his wife, Mary Belle Coles at the age of 19, after Coles needed a ride. Scott would have a short stint in the United States Army in 1943 due to him being drafted for World War II.

After a failed stint as a car shop business owner, Scott would turn to bootlegging moonshine, and would become recognized for evading the police and having seemingly ludicrous stories on how he would evade the police. During his free time, he would watch races at the local Danville Fairgrounds Speedway, wishing that one day, he could race there.With help from fellow bootlegger, Bob McGinnis, Scott would catch a stroke of luck. The Dixie Circuit, a local Southern racing series, was looking for a black man to drive as a marketing gimmick, and would choose Scott to drive. While he had a rough start, within days, Scott would start to beat many regulars, and even win the series. To Scott's surprise, he did not see much discrimination among fans and drivers, and many would respect and defend him as a racer. However, Scott would still have to remain "tough-skinned" all his life, as still, many would still call him the n-word and heckle at Scott, with one notable example being Lynchburg Speedway's announcer calling Scott "the world's only n*gger driver." After gaining recognition in more local Virginia racing series, Scott decided that joining NASCAR would help Scott rise the ranks.

In 1954, Scott would get approved by NASCAR official Maurice Poston to race in NASCAR, breaking the color barrier in the league, to no public attention. In Scott's early NASCAR years, he would race in regional-level races, facing racism from promoters, drivers, and fans. However, as in the local racing series, Scott would gain the respect of his fellow drivers and fans due to his work ethic and talent on the track. In the same year, then NASCAR CEO Bill France Sr. promised in a handshake deal that Scott would be treated fairly as any white racing driver in NASCAR, a promise that stuck with Scott.

After seven years of Scott honing his skills in NASCAR's local and modified divisions, Scott would buy a car from fellow driver Buck Baker, and announced to his family that Scott would be racing in NASCAR's top series, the NASCAR Grand National Series. He would make his first start on March 4, 1961, at Piedmont Interstate Fairgrounds, to little fanfare, becoming the first black driver to race in NASCAR's top series. He would receive more discrimination, even being banned from Darlington Raceway and its races by its president Bob Colvin, the Rebel 400 and the Southern 500, which were at the time both races held as a celebration for the Confederacy. Scott would still however do well during his rookie season, finishing 32nd in the standings with 4,726 points, the most points received by a rookie.

Wendell's second season started with more discrimination, as while many liked Scott as a person, "it was the idea of a black outdoing them that got them disturbed", according to NASCAR official Art Mitchell. From near fights with driver Bob Welborn for him calling Scott the n-word to only being called by his first name in driver's meetings compared to others being called by their last names, Scott would have to endure racial discrimination from many within the NASCAR community. As Wendell started his third season in 1963, hopes were optimistic, but quickly diminished after being snubbed of his winnings at Riverside International Raceway and a blown engine while qualifying for the 1963 Daytona 500. At the same time, racial tensions were at an all-time high throughout the United States with the civil rights movement in full-swing, causing even more to discriminate against Scott. Scott would take drastic measures to avoid discrimination, including faking being white and being racist to his own sons to get service at truck stops.

In the third race of the 1964 season, Scott would race at the 1964 Jacksonville 200. After Richard Petty had steering issues late in the race, Scott would take the lead with 25 to go in a car previously owned by renowned driver Ned Jarrett. The scoreboard had gone blank, and on the final lap, no white flag was waved. As Scott completed his final lap, no checkered flag was waved. Buck Baker, who was in second two laps down, took the checkered flag and was initially declared the winner. While Baker had his victory celebrations, drivers and fans were confused, as they thought that Scott had won. After NASCAR held a closed meeting for two hours, with spectators, the beauty queen, and Baker gone, NASCAR declared Scott the winner of the race. While NASCAR had insisted they had made an honest mistake, others thought that NASCAR was trying to prevent a race riot.

Heading deeper into the 1964 season, Scott would still face usual discrimination, including being disqualified from races under dubious circumstances and once again being banned from Darlington. Even worse, his sons were now facing discrimination too, but Wendell would defend his sons from hecklers and attackers. However, Wendell would also receive much more support from fans and drivers alike, with many cheering Wendell on as an underdog. Journalist Morris Stephenson had even compared Wendell to achieving as much as Martin Luther King Jr. for the civil rights movement. He would become a local hero in his town of Danville. At the end of the season, it was Wendell's best season yet- finishing 12th in points and getting some small manufacturer support from Ford.

In 1966, while Bill France Sr. became friends with controversial Alabama governor George Wallace, Wendell would buy a new car from Holman-Moody, only to find out the car was essentially broken. The car was rebuilt in 12 days and Scott would still drive the car to impressive finishes with help from Ford boycotting NASCAR, including a 13th-place finish at the 1966 Daytona 500 and podium finishes at local short tracks in North Carolina. At the end of it all, he would finish sixth in points and winning $23,051, more than he had ever earned before. However, many were now starting to question Wendell's age, as at the age of 45, he was one of the oldest drivers in NASCAR. In addition, his son and crucial pit crew member, Wendell Scott Jr., was drafted for the Vietnam War.

In the 1967 season, Wendell faced a downward spiral in performance, with 16 DNFs due to mechanical issues. Scott would have to drive more conservatively, to earn enough money to pay bills. In turn of this, he found himself back in the pack more. He would finish 10th in points, with no top 5s and fewer top 10s than last season. In 1968, while Alabama International Motor Speedway was being built, Wendell Jr., would come back, only for him to be significantly different from what he used to be. He was reported to be more angry and bitter, and arguments occurred often. To make matters worse, Wendell had expected his sons to work as hard as he did, and if they didn't, Wendell would chew them out publicly, angering Wendell Jr. more. Wendell struggled with DNQs and poor results in both the 1968 and 1969 seasons. After a controversial boycott at the 1969 Talladega 500, Scott became cautious of NASCAR officials. In the 1970 season, he was once again banned from numerous tracks and races, once again struggled with mechanical issues, and was forced to still keep trying to make races, otherwise he would be let off of NASCAR's money-deal for racers. In addition, NASCAR was transferring to the modern era, with NASCAR races on dirt, Scott's specialty, eliminated from the schedule.

In 1971, he would once again face extreme difficulties with a slew of mechanical problems and DNQs. The Scott family had to remortgage their house due to a lack of money. In 1972, NASCAR would make a series of major changes, with a notable example being NASCAR landing a new corporate sponsor, the R. J. Reynolds Tobacco Company, with its brand name Winston sponsoring the series. As Scott failed to qualify for more and more races, he would eventually go down a series to the NASCAR Grand National East Series. While Scott would still race in the NASCAR Winston Cup Series, he would be plagued by lack of funding and equipment. However, with some help from millionaire Richard Howard, he would be able to qualify for prestigious races that year. However, with his reputation now being put as a has-been who was majorly uncompetitive, the Scott family were embarrassed at the lack of dignity. The season would show Scott's worst season yet, with the family suffering even more financial troubles. However, Scott would still want to race, and in 1973, an opportunity came up for Scott was too good to pass.

At the 1973 Winston 500, with help from Holman-Moody, loans to friends, taking out mortgages, Scott saw a golden opportunity to give Scott a big break in racing for him to continue. On lap 10, Scott was involved in a big crash that involved over 20 cars, with Scott being majorly injured in the process. Many thought that Scott was dead, but he was able to get out, with major injuries. He was reported to be covered in blood, have a fractured left leg, fractured pelvis in numerous places, broke three ribs, to have ripped most of the skin from his left forearm, and had seriously injured his right kidney. His arm bone was also visible and poking out, according to Frank Scott, Wendell's son. Along with that, the car that Scott had was essentially destroyed. After a couple one off races in the Winston Cup Series and Grand National East Series, Scott would eventually announce his retirement. To make matters worse, his son, Wendell Jr., was facing 61 years in prison for burglary and grand larceny.

Scott was praised after his retirement. He would have a loosely-based movie that showed his life in 1977, called Greased Lightning, with Scott being played by Richard Pryor. Within later years, he would become an active member in his local church. He was praised by civil rights activists and was invited to parties, praised for breaking the color barrier in a Southern sport in the Jim Crow era. However, Scott wondered how different his life and career could have been if he had come later, and if he had factory support. Still in debt from the wreck in 1973, he would see Willy T. Ribbs with multi-million dollar sponsorship, qualify for the 1989 Indianapolis 500, becoming the first black driver to qualify for the Indianapolis 500. He said to himself, "I came along too soon."

Scott died on December 23, 1990. Scott's legacy remained vital to many black drivers in NASCAR in the years to come, including Bill Lester, Chase Austin, and (not mentioned in the book) Bubba Wallace. Scott had only been remembered by many as the first black driver to compete and win in NASCAR's top series, but he wasn't remembered for the struggles and hardships Scott had to face. Humpy Wheeler suggested that NASCAR hold a "Wendell Scott Day" or that Wendell Scott be inducted into the then-new NASCAR Hall of Fame in 2010 (he was eventually inducted in 2015). However, many do remember that Scott had broken a barrier that was unthinkable- he had become the first black driver in a sport that was stereotyped for being a "white, Southern" sport within fire of both the Jim Crow era and civil rights movement, no funding, less publicity from other black athletes like Jackie Robinson, and the challenges of being discriminated by many of NASCAR's higher-ups and no factory support. He is remembered for determination and work ethic, as while he had faced many challenges, he would keep on going, no matter what.

== Reception ==
Reception for the book is relatively positive from both NASCAR fans and motorsports fans in general. Elizabeth Blackstock, a reporter for Jalopnik, a car news site, reported that the book was a good reminder that NASCAR had to recognize and acknowledge its racist past, citing Scott's snubbed win at the 1964 Jacksonville 200 and other examples of where Scott was intentionally targeted by both NASCAR and its white drivers.

Publishers Weekly, in a 2008 review wrote that "Donovan's writing is well-paced and measured, clearly depicting the complex atmosphere of race relations in the segregated South. His extensive reporting, including interviews with Scott before he died in 1990, combined with his descriptive and enjoyable prose about racing, make this book a deeply compelling story."
