= Khalil Gibran Muhammad =

American academic (born 1972)

Khalil Muhammad
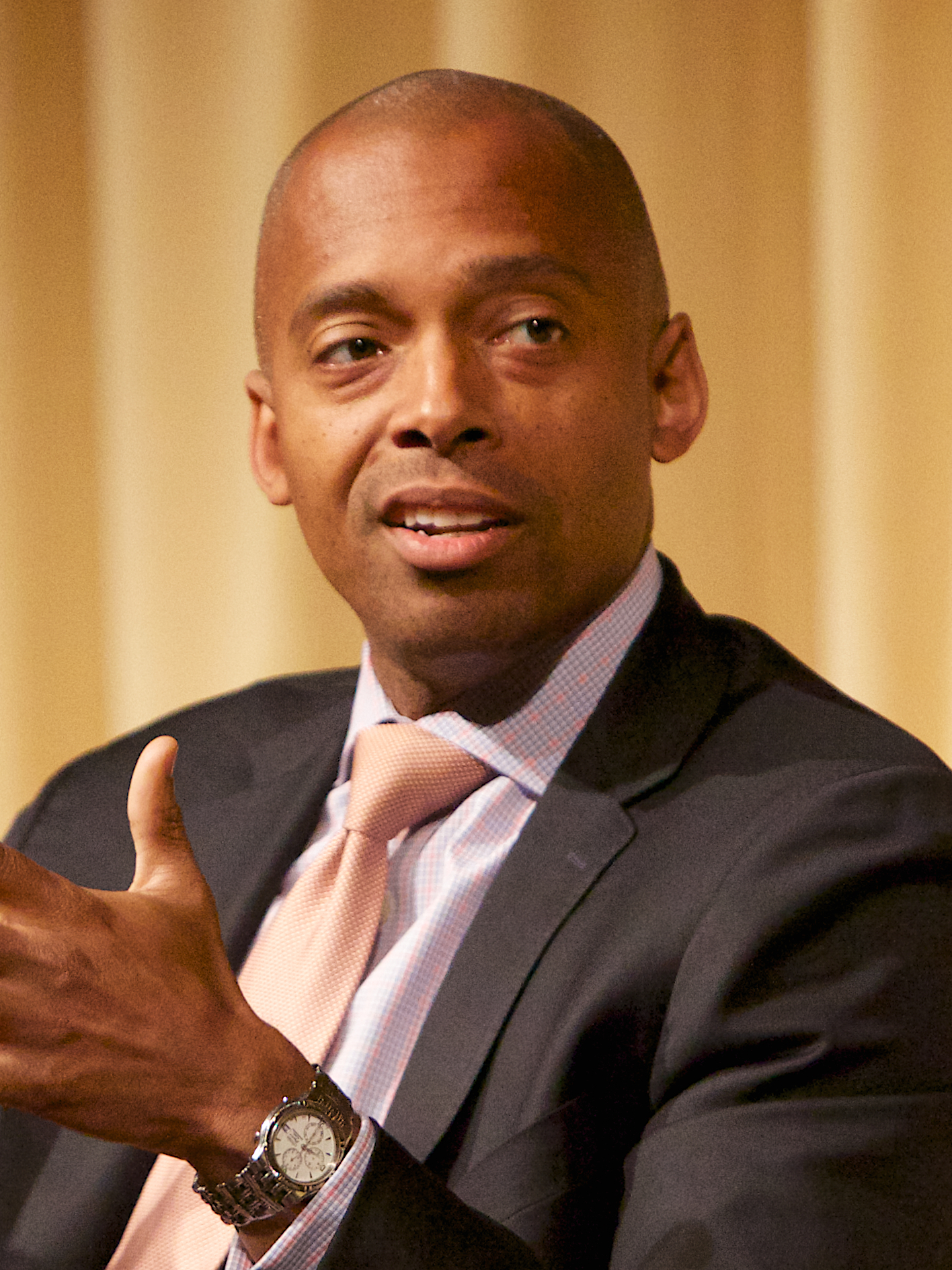
- Muhammad in 2014
- Born: April 27, 1972 (age 54); Chicago, Illinois U.S.
- Education: University of Pennsylvania (BA); Rutgers University, New Brunswick (MA, PhD)
- Occupations: Professor, historian
- Children: 3
- Relatives: Ozier Muhammad (father); Elijah Muhammad (great-grandfather)

Khalil Gibran Muhammad (born April 27, 1972) is an American academic. He is the inaugural Professor of African American Studies and Public Affairs at the African American studies department and Princeton School of Public and International Affairs at Princeton, where he directs the Institutional Antiracism and Accountability Project. Prior to 2025, he was the Ford Foundation Professor of History, Race, and Public Policy at Harvard Kennedy School and the Radcliffe Institute. He is the former director of the Schomburg Center for Research in Black Culture, a Harlem-based branch of the New York Public Library system, a research facility dedicated to the history of the African diaspora. Prior to joining the Schomburg Center in 2010, Muhammad was an associate professor of history at Indiana University Bloomington.

== Early life and education ==
Muhammad grew up in South Side, Chicago, a middle-class community that was predominantly segregated. He attended Kenwood Academy in Hyde Park. He is the son of Pulitzer Prize-winning New York Times photographer Ozier Muhammad and Dr. Kimberly Muhammad-Earl, a teacher and administrator at the Chicago Board of Education. His paternal great-grandfather is Elijah Muhammad, an African-American religious leader, who led the Nation of Islam (NOI) from 1934 until his death in 1975 when Muhammad was 2 1/2 years old.

In 1993, he graduated from the University of Pennsylvania with a bachelor's degree in economics. During college, Muhammad became a member of the Delta Eta chapter of Kappa Alpha Psi fraternity.

In 2004, Muhammad received his Ph.D. in American history from Rutgers University, specializing in 20th century and African-American history. In 2013, Muhammad was awarded an Honorary Doctorate from The New School.

== Career ==
After graduation from college, he worked as a public accountant at the financial advisory firm Deloitte & Touche LLP for three years. Initially planning a career in business, influenced by Rodney King case and O J Simpson murder case, Muhammad decided to shift to history and academia.

From 2003 to 2005, Muhammad worked as a postdoctoral Fellow at the Vera Institute of Justice, a nonprofit criminal justice reform agency in New York City.

In 2005, he joined the faculty of Indiana University Bloomington as professor of American history, African American and African diaspora studies and American studies.

From 2010 until 2015, he served as director of the Schomburg Center for Research in Black Culture. He succeeded long-time director, Howard Dodson.

In December 2015, it was announced that Muhammad would leave his position at the Schomburg center to teach at Harvard University. At Harvard he is professor of history, race and public policy at the Harvard Kennedy School, and holds a dual appointment at Radcliffe Institute for Advanced Study.

On October 2, 2024 the Princeton University Board of Trustees approved the appointment of Muhammad as Professor of African American studies and public affairs. His appointment will begin on January 1, 2025.

== Author ==
Muhammad is the author of The Condemnation of Blackness: Race, Crime, and the Making of Modern Urban America, published by Harvard University Press. The Condemnation of Blackness won the American Studies Association John Hope Franklin Publication Prize, which is awarded annually to the best published book in American studies.

As an academic, Muhammad is at the forefront of scholarship on the enduring link between race and crime in the United States that has shaped and limited opportunities for African Americans. His research interests include the racial politics of criminal law, policing, juvenile delinquency and punishment, as well as immigration and social reform.

Muhammad is working on his second book, Disappearing Acts: The End of White Criminality in the Age of Jim Crow, which traces the historical roots of the changing demographics of crime and punishment so evident today.

His writing has been featured in The New York Times, The Nation, The New Yorker, The Washington Post, The Guardian, and The Atlanta Journal-Constitution, as well as on Moyers & Company, MSNBC, C-SPAN, NPR, Pacifica Radio, and Radio One.

== Professional affiliations and honors ==
Muhammad has been an associate editor of The Journal of American History, and was recently appointed to the editorial board of Transition Magazine, published by the W.E.B. Du Bois Institute at Harvard University. He has served or currently serves on the New York City Council's Task Force to Combat Gun Violence, the United States National Research Council's Committee on the Causes and Consequences of High Rates of Incarceration, and the board of the Barnes Foundation.

In 2011, Crain's New York Business chose Muhammad as one of its notable 40 Under 40.

In 2012, he was listed as #49 on the Root 100.

He regularly appears on the Melissa Harris-Perry show.

== Personal life ==
Muhammad has been married to Stephanie Lawson-Muhammad since 1998. Together they have three children.

He was named after the Lebanese-American artist, poet, and writer of the New York Pen League, Khalil Gibran.

== Selected works and publications ==
- Muhammad, Khalil Gibran (1999). "Race, Crime, and Social Mobility: Black and Italian Undesirables in Modern America". In Ashyk, Dan; Gardaphe, Fred L.; Tamburri, Anthony Julian (eds.). Shades of Black and White: Conflict and Collaboration Between Two Communities. Staten Island, NY: American Italian Historical Association. ISBN 978-0-93-467544-4. OCLC 869009041. "Selected essays from the 30th Annual Conference of the American Italian Historical Association, 13–15 November 1997, Cleveland, Ohio"
- Muhammad, Khalil Gibran (September 2006). "Review of The Other Side of Middletown: Exploring Muncie's African American Community". Indiana Magazine of History. 102 (3). Indiana University Department of History: 269–270. ISSN 0019-6673. JSTOR 27792734. OCLC 5556667278.
- Muhammad, Khalil G. (9 December 2007). "White May Be Might, But It's Not Always Right". The Washington Post.
- Muhammad, Khalil Gibran (2010). The Condemnation of Blackness: Race, Crime, and the Making of Modern Urban America. Cambridge, Mass.: Harvard University Press. ISBN 978-0-67-405432-5. OCLC 812553821.
- Muhammad, Khalil Gibran (18 March 2011). "Where Did All the White Criminals Go?: Reconfiguring Race and Crime on the Road to Mass Incarceration". Souls. 13 (1): 72–90. doi:10.1080/10999949.2011.551478. ISSN 1099-9949. S2CID 144082064.
- Muhammad, Khalil Gibran (5 April 2012). "Playing the Violence Card". The New York Times.
- Muhammad, Khalil Gibran (18 June 2012). "Rodney King's legacy was to blast away the myth of a post-racial US | Khalil Gibran Muhammad". The Guardian.
- Muhammad, Khalil Gibran (21 September 2015). "'Black Silent Majority,' by Michael Javen Fortner". The New York Times.
- Muhammad, Khalil Gibran (12 April 2016). "'Ghetto,' by Mitchell Duneier". The New York Times.
