= Jackie Crosby =

American journalist (born 1961)

Jacqueline Garton Crosby (May 13, 1961) is an American journalist. She won the 1985 Pulitzer Prize for Specialized Reporting with Randall Savage for investigating athletics and academics at the University of Georgia and Georgia Tech.

== Biography ==
Crosby was born on May 13, 1961, to Marianne (Garton) and James Ellis Crosby. She graduated from the University of Georgia in 1983 with a Bachelor of Journalism. While at the university, she worked as sports writer for The Red & Black, the student newspaper, and wrote a story about a football player who had been 'illegally recruited'. She worked at the Macon Telegraph from 1980 to 1984 as a staff writer, and became sports writer in July 1983. She left the Macon Telegraph in May 1984, and began working at the Orlando Sentinel as a sports copy-editor. She left that paper in January 1985. That same year, the Associated Press named one of her stories 'Best Series of the Year'. Crosby also won the 1985 Pulitzer Prize for Specialized Reporting with Randall Savage for an eighteen story investigation into athletics and academics at the University of Georgia and Georgia Tech. The pair investigated and found that athletes received preferential treatment.

At the age of 23, Crosby was the youngest person to ever receive a Pulitzer Prize, and since Stephanie Welsh's 1996 win at age 22, she became the second youngest. Crosby shortly left the Macon Telegraph, returning to graduate school to work on her Master of Business Administration at the University of Florida.The following year, Crosby became a staff writer. For two years, from 1987 to 1989, she worked at Ivanhoe Communications as 'Special Projects Director' and held the same position at KSTP-TV in Saint Paul, Minnesota, from 1989 to 1994. That year, Crosby became assistant news editor at the Minneapolis Star-Tribune. At the Star-Tribune, Jackie was the business reporter in 2016, writing about "the impact that aging baby boomers and rising millennials are having on the economy, health care system and workplace".
