= Joshua Friedman =

American journalist

Joshua Friedman is an American journalist who worked 32 years for newspapers and won a Pulitzer Prize in 1985. He formerly chaired the Committee to Protect Journalists and directed International Programs at Columbia University Graduate School of Journalism. At the journalism school he also directed the Maria Moors Cabot Prize, inaugurated in 1939, which annually recognizes outstanding coverage of the Americas (the Western hemisphere) by journalists based there. He worked at Columbia as either full-time or adjunct faculty since 1992. European Journalism Centre (EJC) and the Georgian Institute of Public Affairs (GIPA), established the annual GIPA-Friedman prize in 2012 to honor the excellence in journalism in the South Caucasus country. Friedman is on the board of the committee to Protect Journalists and served as an early chair of CPJ. He is on the advisory board of the Dart Center on Journalism and Trauma. Friedman currently serves as vice-chair at the Carey Institute for Global Good and is also on the advisory board of the institute's Nonfiction Program.

== Education ==
Friedman is a 1964 graduate of Rutgers College and a1968 graduate of the Columbia School of Journalism.

== Awards and honors ==
Working for Newsday in 1984, Friedman, fellow reporter Dennis Bell, and photographer Ozier Muhammad created a series of articles "on the plight of the hungry in Africa", namely the 1983–1985 famine in Ethiopia, for which they won the annual Pulitzer Prize for International Reporting in 1985. He won Pulitzers in 1979 (for his Three Mile Island Coverage) and 1985 while at The Philadelphia Inquirer.

In 2013, the Columbia University School of Journalism honored him with an Alumni Award ("The Alumni Awards are presented annually for a distinguished journalism career in any medium, an outstanding single journalistic accomplishment, a notable contribution to journalism education or an achievement in related fields.")
