= Alice Steinbach =

American journalist and author

Alice C. Steinbach
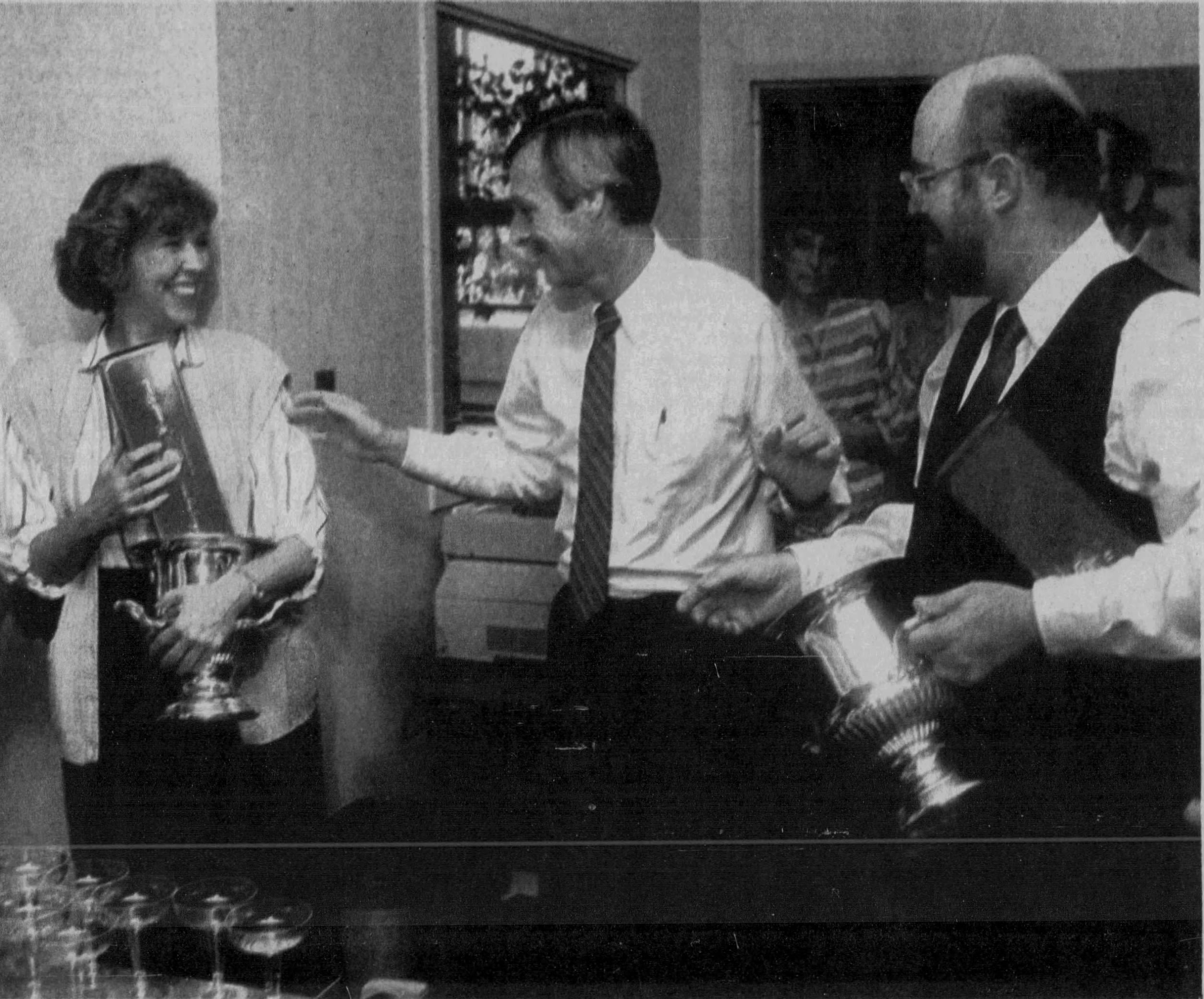
- Steinbach (left) with Reg Murphy and Jon Franklin celebrating the 1985 Pulitzer Prize
- Born: October 10, 1933
- Died: March 13, 2012 (aged 78); Roland Park, Maryland, U.S.
- Occupations: journalist, author
- Notable credit(s): The Baltimore Sun, The Miss Dennis School of Writing: And Other Lessons from a Woman's Life, Without Reservations: The Travels of an Independent Woman, Educating Alice: Adventures of a Curious Woman.

Alice C. Steinbach (October 10, 1933 – March 13, 2012) was an American journalist and author who won the 1985 Pulitzer Prize for Feature Writing for her feature for the Baltimore Sun Magazine, A Boy of Unusual Vision, which describes the experience of a blind 10-year old boy, Calvin Stanley.

== Biography ==
Steinbach was born in Roland Park, Maryland, October 10, 1933. She graduated from Western High School in 1951.

Steinbach worked for the Baltimore Sun from 1981 to 1999. She later became an author, freelance writer, and lecturer. She taught writing and journalism at Washington and Lee University, Princeton University, and Loyola College.
