= Richard Popkin =

American academic philosopher (1923–2005)

- Born: December 27, 1923; Manhattan, New York
- Died: April 14, 2005 (aged 81); Los Angeles, California

Education
- Education: Columbia University (PhD, 1950)
- Academic advisors: Charles W. Hendel; Paul Oskar Kristeller; John Herman Randall Jr.

Philosophical work
- Era: 20th-century philosophy
- Region: Western philosophy
- School: Scepticism, Pyrrhonian skepticism
- Institutions: University of Connecticut; University of Iowa; Harvey Mudd College; University of California, San Diego; Lehman College; Washington University in St. Louis; University of California, Los Angeles
- Main interests: History of philosophy, Seventeenth century, Eighteenth century, Jewish philosophers, Jewish philosophy, millenarianism and messianism
- Notable ideas: Influence of Pyrrhonian skepticism on Western philosophy

Richard Henry Popkin (December 27, 1923 – April 14, 2005) was an American academic philosopher who specialized in the history of enlightenment philosophy and early modern anti-dogmatism. His 1960 work The History of Scepticism from Erasmus to Descartes introduced one previously unrecognized influence on Western thought in the seventeenth century, the Pyrrhonian Scepticism of Sextus Empiricus. Popkin was also an internationally acclaimed scholar of Christian millenarianism and Jewish messianism.

== Life ==
Richard Popkin was born into a Jewish family in Manhattan to author Zelda Popkin and her husband Louis Popkin, who together ran a small public relations firm. He attended DeWitt Clinton High School, where he met his future wife, Juliet Greenstone. He earned his bachelor's degree and, in 1950, his Ph.D. from Columbia University. He taught at American universities, including the University of Connecticut, The University of Iowa, Harvey Mudd College, the University of California, San Diego, Washington University in St. Louis, and the University of California, Los Angeles. He was visiting professor at University of California Berkeley, Brandeis University, Duke University, Emory University, Tel Aviv University, and he was Distinguished Professor at Lehman College from 1971 to 1973. Popkin was the founding director of the International Archives of the History of Ideas.

Among his honors, Popkin was awarded the Nicholas Murray Butler Medal by Columbia University and was a fellow of the American Academy of Arts and Sciences. He was president emeritus and founding editor of the Journal of the History of Philosophy.

Richard Popkin spent his later years living in Pacific Palisades, California. He died of emphysema in Santa Monica in April 2005. His papers have been archived at the William Andrews Clark Memorial Library at UCLA.

== Family ==
Popkin was survived by Juliet (née Greenstone, 1924–2015), whom he married in 1944, and two of their three children, the historian Jeremy Popkin (b. 1948) and his younger daughter, Susan Popkin (b. 1961). Margaret Popkin (1950–2005) was a prominent civil rights lawyer and activist, known particularly for her work in El Salvador during the civil war of the 1980s.

== Works ==
Popkin published many textbooks on philosophy, some with Avrum Stroll. He was editor and translator of selections from Pierre Bayle’s Historical and Critical Dictionary (1965). His last book, Disputing Christianity (2007), was completed posthumously by his son Jeremy.

Popkin published two autobiographical writings: Intellectual Autobiography: Warts and All in The Sceptical Mode in Modern Philosophy. Essays in Honor of Richard H. Popkin, 1988, pp. 103–149, and a continuation: Introduction: Warts and All Part 2, in Everything Connects: In Conference with Richard H. Popkin. Essays in His Honor, 1999, pp. XI-LXXVI.

Beyond his philosophical works, he is noted for writing The Second Oswald (1966), questioning the Warren Report lone gunman explanation of the John F. Kennedy assassination. Popkin's theory was that a look-alike of Lee Harvey Oswald was the actual assassin of Kennedy. It featured an introduction by the journalist Murray Kempton. Previously he had written an article in the New York Review of Books advocating the same hypothesis. In 1969 he was a part of the newly formed Committee to Investigate Assassinations.

== Selected bibliography ==
=== Works authored ===
- The History of Scepticism from Savonarola to Bayle. Third enlarged edition, Oxford University Press, 2003. ISBN 0-19-510768-3. (Earlier editions published as The History of Scepticism From Erasmus to Descartes, Assen: Van Gorcum, 1960 and The History of Scepticism from Erasmus to Spinoza, University of California Press, 1979. ISBN 0-520-03876-2).
- The High Road to Pyrrhonism, edited by Richard A. Watson and James E. Force, Austin Hill Press, 1980 (reprint: Indianapolis: Hackett, 1993).
  - Include: Hume's Racism Reconsidered, pp. 64–75.
- Isaac La Peyrère (1596-1676): His Life, Work, and Influence, Leiden: Brill, 1987.
- The Third Force in Seventeenth-Century Thought, Leiden: Brill, 1992. Collection of essays.
- Spinoza (Oneworld Philosophers), 2004. ISBN 1-85168-339-9.
- Disputing Christianity. The 400-Year-Old Debate over Rabbi Isaac ben Abraham of Troki's Classic Arguments, Amherst, N.Y.: Humanity Books, 2007.
- with David S. Katz: Messianic Revolution. Radical Religious Politics to the End of the Second Millennium, Hill & Wang, 2000.
- with Avrum Stroll: Philosophy Made Simple, Doubleday (Made Simple Books), New York, 1956. ISBN 0-385-42533-3.
- with Avrum Stroll: Introduction to Philosophy, New York: Holt, Rinehart, and Winston, 1961, (second edition 1972, third revised edition 1979).
- with Avrum Stroll: Philosophy and the Human Spirit. A Brief Introduction, New York: Holt, Rinehart and Winston, 1973.
- with Avrum Stroll: Skeptical Philosophy for Everyone, Amherst, N.Y.: Prometheus Books, 2002.

=== Works edited ===
- The Philosophy of the Sixteenth and Seventeenth Centuries, New York: Free Press, 1966.
- Pascal Selections, MacMillan, 1989.
- Scepticism in the History of Philosophy. A Pan-American Dialogue, Dordrecht: Kluwer, 1996.
- The Columbia History of Western Philosophy, Columbia University Press, 1999. ISBN 0-231-10128-7.
- with Silvia Berti and Françoise Charles-Daubert, Heterodoxy, Spinozism, and Free Thought in Early-Eighteenth-Century Europe. Studies on the Traité des trois imposteurs, Dordrecht: Kluwer, 1996.
- with Allison P. Coudert and Gordon M. Weiner, Leibniz, Mysticism, and Religion, Dordrecht: Kluwer, 1998.
- with James E. Force, Essays on the Context, Nature, and Influence of Isaac Newton's Theology, Dordrecht: Kluwer, 1990.
- with James E. Force, The Books of Nature and Scripture. Recent Essays on Natural Philosophy, Theology, and Biblical Criticism in the Netherlands of Spinoza's Time and the British Isles of Newton's Time, Dordrecht: Kluwer, 1994.
- with James E. Force, Newton and Religion. Context, Nature, and Influence, Dordrecht: Kluwer, 1999.
- with Yosef Kaplan and Henry Méchoulan, Menasseh Ben Israel and His World, Leiden: Brill, 1989.
- with Donald R. Kelley, The Shapes of Knowledge from the Renaissance to the Enlightenment, Dordrecht: Kluwer, 1991.
- with José R. Maia Neto, Skepticism in Renaissance and Post-Renaissance Thought. New Interpretations, Amherst, N.Y.: Humanity Books, 2004.
- with José R. Maia Neto, Skepticism: An Anthology, Prometheus Books, 2007.
- with Martin Mulsow, Secret Conversions to Judaism in Early Modern Europe, Leiden: Brill, 2004.
- with Ezequiel de Olaso, Georgio Tonelli, Scepticism in the Enlightenment, Dordrecht: Kluwer, 1997.
- with Jeremy D. Popkin, The Abbé Grégoire and His World, Dordrecht: Kluwer, 2000.
- with Charles B. Schmitt, Scepticism from the Renaissance to the Enlightenment, Wiesbaden: O. Harrassowitz, 1987.
- with Michael Signer, Spinoza's Earliest Publication? The Hebrew Translation of Margaret Fell's A Loving Salutation to the Seed of Abraham among the Jews, wherever they Are Scattered Up and Down Upon the Face of the Earth, Assen: Van Gorcum, 1987.
- with Avrum Stroll: Philosophy and Contemporary Problems. A Reader, New York: Holt, Rinehart, and Winston, 1984.
- with Arjo Vanderjagt, Scepticism and Irreligion in the Seventeenth and Eighteenth Centuries, Leiden: Brill, 1993.
- with Gordon M. Weiner, Jewish Christians and Christian Jews. From the Renaissance to the Enlightenment, Dordrecht: Kluwer, 1994.
- with Johan van der Zande, The Skeptical Tradition Around 1800. Skepticism in Philosophy, Science, and Society, Dordrecht: Kluwer, 1998.
- Millenarianism and Messianism in Early Modern Culture (4 vols.), Dordrecht: Kluwer.
  - Vol. 1: Matt Goldish and R. H. Popkin (eds.). Jewish Messianism in the Early Modern World, 2001.
  - Vol. 2: Karl Kottmnan (ed.). Catholic Millenarianism: From Savonarola to the Abbé Gregoire, 2001.
  - Vol. 3: James E. Force and R. H. Popkin (eds.). The Millenarian Turn: Millenarian Contexts of Science, Politics and Everyday Anglo-American Life in the Seventeenth and Eighteenth Centuries, 2001.
  - Vol. 4: John Christian Laursen and R. H. Popkin (eds.). Continental Millenarians: Protestants, Catholics, Heretics, 2001.

=== Non-academic works ===
- The Second Oswald. Avon Books (1966). ISBN 1886420270 (ebook).
- Introduction to Lane, Mark; Freed, Donald (1973). Executive Action: Assassination of a Head of State. Dell Publishing.

=== Essays in honor of R. H. Popkin ===
- Richard A. Watson and James E. Force (eds.), The Sceptical Mode in Modern Philosophy. Essays in Honor of Richard H. Popkin, Dordrecht: Martinus Nijhoff, 1988.
- Jeremy D. Popkin (ed.), The Legacies of Richard Popkin, Dordrecht: Springer, 2008.
- James E. Force and David S. Katz (eds.), Everything Connects. In Conference with Richard H. Popkin: Essays in His Honor, Leiden: Brill, 1999.
- José Raimundo Maia Neto, Gianni Paganini, John Christian Laursen (eds.) Skepticism in the Modern Age. Building on the Work of Richard Popkin, Leiden: Brill, 2009.

== See also ==
- American philosophy
