= John Edwin Smith =

American philosopher (1921-2009)

- Born: May 27, 1921; New York City, U.S.
- Died: December 7, 2009 (aged 88); Arlington, Virginia, U.S.

Education
- Education: Columbia University (PhD, 1948)
- Thesis: Royce's Social Infinite: An Analysis of the Theory of Interpretation and Community (1948)

Philosophical work
- Era: Contemporary philosophy
- Region: Western philosophy
- School: Pragmatism
- Institutions: Vassar College; Barnard College; Yale University
- Doctoral students: Daniel Breazeale
- Notable students: Richard J. Bernstein
- Main interests: Metaphysics

John Edwin Smith (May 27, 1921 – December 7, 2009) was an American philosopher and Clark Professor of Philosophy at Yale University, born in Brooklyn, New York City.

He served as president of the National American Philosophical Society, Eastern Division, the American Theological Society, the Metaphysical Society of America, the Joseph F. Hegel Society of America (1970–1972) and the Charles S. Peirce Society.
