= Cartesian anxiety =

Cartesian anxiety is a philosophical concept for the conflict that a subject experiences of failing to have—in reality—either a fixed and stable foundation for knowledge of what is and is not real, or an inescapable and incomprehensible groundlessness of reality. Richard J. Bernstein coined and used the term in his 1983 book Beyond Objectivism and Relativism: Science, Hermeneutics, and Praxis, referring to the feelings expressed by René Descartes, its namesake, in his Meditations on First Philosophy.
