= Charles W. Hendel =

American Hume scholar (1890–1982)

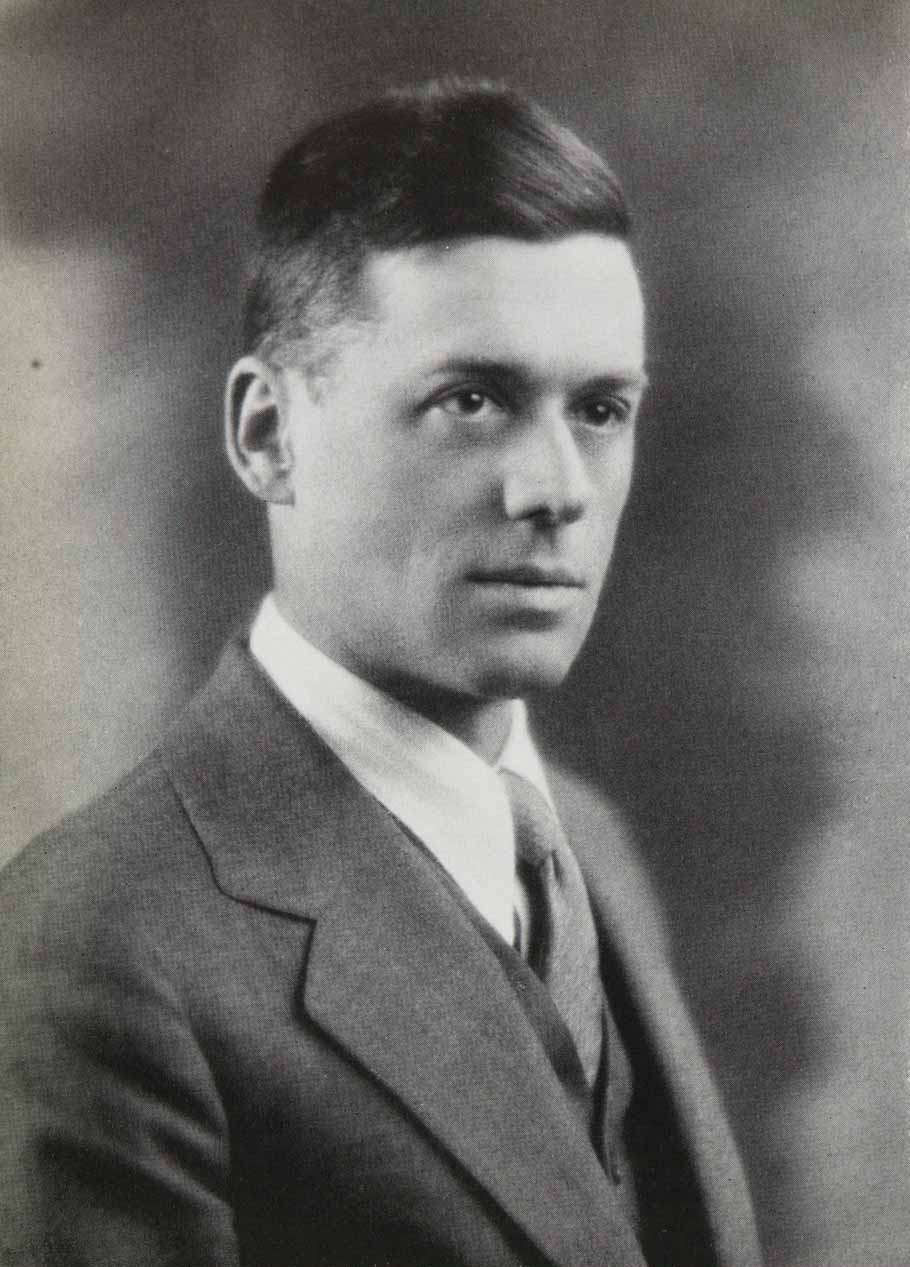
- Born: Charles William Hendel Jr. December 16, 1890; Reading, Pennsylvania, U.S.
- Died: November 12, 1982 (aged 91); Salt Lake City, Utah, U.S.
- Spouse: Elizabeth Jones (m. 1916)
- Children: 2

Education
- Education: Princeton University (PhD, 1917)

Philosophical work
- Era: Contemporary philosophy
- Region: Western philosophy
- Institutions: Williams College; Princeton University; McGill University; Yale University
- Doctoral students: Richard J. Bernstein
- Notable students: Daniel Breazeale; Richard Popkin
- Main interests: History of philosophy, ethics, philosophy of religion
- Military career
- Allegiance: United States of America
- Branch: United States Army
- Service years: 1917–1918
- Rank: 2nd Lieutenant
- Unit: 78th Training Division
- Conflicts: World War I

Charles William Hendel Jr. (16 December 1890 – 12 November 1982) was an American philosopher and Hume scholar. He was elected as the President of the Eastern Division of the American Philosophical Association in 1940 until 1941 as well as the president of the American Society for Political and Legal Philosophy from 1959 until 1961. He is well known to be a David Hume scholar who edited used editions of Hume's major work.

== Early life and education ==
Charles William Hendel Jr. was born on 16 December 1890 in Reading, Pennsylvania to Charles William Hendel Sr. and Emma Leninger Stolz Hendel.

In 1916, Hendel married Elizabeth Jones and had two children together, James Norman and Charles William III.

Hendel attended Princeton University and received the Bachelor of Letters in 1913. He then studied at Marburg University for the same year until 1914, where he then studied at the Collège de France. He then went back to America to graduate at Princeton with a PhD in 1917.

== Career ==
Hendel served in World War I where he was enlisted in 1917 as part of the 78th Training Division, where he rosed to second lieutenant during that time. He continued his position as second lieutenant until the end of the war, after which he then took the position as a teacher in Princeton Preparatory School in 1919. He was also an instructor at Williams College at the same year until 1920.

Hendel worked as an assistant professor in Princeton in 1920 and was promoted to associate professor in 1926. In 1929, he went to McGill University where he became Macdonald Professor of Moral Philosophy and Chairman of the Department of Philosophy. He became the dean of the Faculty of Arts from 1937 to 1940. During that time, he was elected as the President of the Eastern Division of the American Philosophical Association in 1940 until 1941. A 1940 McGill yearbook detailing his resignation from the University considered Hendel to be the first Canadian to be elected in that spot, while also noting that he was born in Pennsylvania.

He resigned his post in McGill on September 1, 1940, and moved to New Haven, Connecticut, where he became the Clark Professor of Moral Philosophy and Metaphysics and Chairman of the Philosophy Department in Yale University. Among his students was academic philosopher Richard Popkin. He worked as a professor from 1943 to 1959, where he became professor emeritus from 1959 until his death. Following his retirement, he was then elected as the President of the American Society for Political and Legal Philosophy from 1959 to 1961. He delivered a Gifford Lecture at the University of Glasgow in 1962–3.

He was awarded the William C. DeVane Medal of the Yale Chapter of Phi Beta Kappa as well as an honorary degree in the Master of Arts in 1940.

Hendel died in Salt Lake City, Utah on November 12, 1982.

== Works on David Hume ==
Hendel's research on David Hume's major works is said to made valuable contributions to the field. His most notable work, Studies in the Philosophies of David Hume, details the history of Hume's philosophy and which people and sources influenced him. Hendel was one of the first to discern the works of Cicero in order to understand Hume. He also gave credit to the works of Michel de Montaigne and Joseph Butler in order to understand Hume's background.

He was also one of the first scholars to postulate that Hume's works are motivated by theological concerns. He argues that Hume searched for a principle of causation because he wanted to explain the world without an appeal to God. Hendel believed that Hume's message on cause and effect being part of the imagination is not him denying the idea of causality because mental habits of thought that represent a fact may lead to the truth if provided further experience in the world. Furthermore, Hendel argued that Hume didn't denied the reality of self but rather denying the scholarly views on self as a soul, adding that Hume's perception on self is an organization of beliefs and habits.

In the part on Dialogues Concerning Natural Religion in his work, He argued that Philo and Cleanthes are just two different ways in viewing religious beliefs, and that Pamphilus is a stand-in character for Hume's, who listened to both sides of the conversation and the one who didn't have any personal connection to one character or another. Hendel implied Hume was an idealist. He argued that Hume's position are that things are believed to exist when given perception in relation to other concepts. Hendel also suggested that no experience can be real unless it is a part of a system of other experiences.

== Publications ==
=== As author ===
- 1925: Studies in the philosophy of David Hume, Princeton University Press
- 1934: Jean Jacques Rousseau: Moralist, The Bobbs-Merrill Company, Inc.
- 1937: Jean Jacques Rousseau, Citizen of Geneva, Oxford University Press
- 1946: Philosophy in American Education, with Brand Blanshard et al., Harper & Brothers
- 1946: Preface to Philosophy, with William Ernest Hocking et al., Macmillan Publishers
- 1948: Civilization & Religion: An Argument about Values in Human Life, Yale University Press
- 1957: The Philosophy of Kant and Our Modern World, Four Lectures Delivered at Yale University Commemorating the 150th Anniversary of the Death of Immanual Kant, Liberal Arts Press

=== As editor ===
- 1927: Selections, by Hume, edited by Hendel, Charles Scribner's Sons
- 1946: The Myth of the State, by Cassirer, edited by Hendel, Yale University Press
- 1950: The Problem of Knowledge: Philosophy, Science, and History Since Hegel, by Cassirer, translated by Hendel and Hoglom, Yale University Press
- 1953: The Philosophy of Symbolic Forms, by Cassirer, introduction by Hendel, BookCrafters, lnc.
- 1953: David Hume's Political Essays, by Hume, edited by Hendel, The Bobbs-Merrill Company, Inc.
- 1955: An Inquiry Concerning Human Understanding, by Hume, edited by Hendel, The Bobbs-Merrill Company, Inc.
- 1957: An Inquiry Concerning the Principles of Morals, by Hume, edited by Hendel, Liberal Arts Press
- 1959: John Dewey and the Experimental Spirit in Philosophy, edited by Hendel, Liberal Arts Press
