= Sally Kempton =

American Swami, journalist and radical feminist (1943–2023)

- Born: January 15, 1943; Manhattan, New York, U.S.
- Died: July 10, 2023 (aged 80); Carmel Valley, California, U.S.
- Education: Sarah Lawrence College
- Occupations: Swami, journalist, meditation teacher
- Father: Murray Kempton
- Website: www.sallykempton.com

Sally Kempton (January 15, 1943 – July 10, 2023), also known as Swami Durgananda, was an American swami, journalist, radical feminist, and meditation teacher.

== Early life and education ==
Sally Kempton was born on January 15, 1943, in Manhattan. Her father was well-known journalist Murray Kempton. She was the oldest of five children and spent her formative years in Princeton, New Jersey.

She attended Sarah Lawrence College, influenced by her boyfriend's perception of the institution's femininity. As a student, she co-edited a magazine parody, The Establishment.

Kempton's parents divorced when she was in college.

== Career ==
=== Journalism ===
After graduation, Kempton started her career as a journalist and wrote articles for the Village Voice, Esquire, and The New York Times, on counterculture-related topics.

=== Feminism ===
Kempton became a member of the New York Radical Feminists and advocated for women's rights.

At age 26 she wrote "Cutting Loose", an article originally published in Esquire in July 1970, which critiqued societal gender norms and garnered significant attention. The New York Times said that "The basic point of the essay was that she had been groomed to be a certain kind of bright but compliant helpmeet, and she was spitting mad at herself for succeeding," and described the article as "a scream of marital rage.”

Kempton later said of the article "I knew the writing came from the place that’s the closest you can get to truth. But the downside was, I became a character in a public story that resembled mine but was a huge oversimplification of a complex life."

=== Asian spirituality, meditation and seeking enlightenment ===
Kempton reported her first euphoric experience occurring in her West Village apartment, during a psychedelic encounter accompanied by the Grateful Dead's "Ripple". "All the complexities and the suffering and the pain and the mental stuff I was concerned with as a downtown New York journalist just dissolved, and all I could see was love," she said later. When she described her new insight to her boyfriend, she said, he responded by asking, "Haven’t you ever taken acid before?"

In 1974 (4 years after Cutting Loose was published) Kempton met, at the insistence of friends, the Indian mystic, Swami Muktananda, or Baba, the leader of the Siddha Yoga movement, and shortly thereafter moved into his ashram. In 1982, she became a Siddha Yoga swami, being given the name Swami Durgananda and taking vows of chastity and poverty. She lived as a monk in Baba's ashrams, first in India and then in the Catskills.

Kempton initially focused very much on Baba, and frequently experienced bliss. Baba died in 1982. Kempton later said "What I learned is that the guru is not Baba or Gurumayi but an energy that’s present in the guru and lives in you as well.... When you realize the energy is there when the guru isn’t present and you internalize it more. In the final stage, you own it." The Oakland Tribune reported in 1983, "The Sally Kempton who had written about sexual rage in Esquire no longer existed." Kempton found teaching rewarding, but experienced feelings of sadness.

As of 2001 Kempton said, of her move to spiritual focus, that she was a feminist for only a year when she realised she’d turned from "radical self blame to radical blaming of others. The truth was, I was responsible for my life. It wasn’t any guy’s fault."

She said that, as of 2001, she had been experiencing a reality of joy in daily life for ten years, in contrast in her past life when she had been in pain almost all the time. She attributed the change to her work in Siddha Yoga.

In 2002, after spending 28 years in Siddha Yoga ashrams, Kempton gave up her vows as a swami and moved to Carmel, California. She said she had stopped growing.

In subsequent years, Kempton traveled extensively teaching meditation and spiritual philosophy. She published books and articles on these subjects, and for several years she wrote regular articles on spirituality for the Yoga Journal. Feminine consciousness was a focus for her. Her main focus was seeking full enlightenment.

== Personal life ==
Kempton was described by writer John Gregory Dunne as, in the late 1960s, being "bright, extremely attractive, tall, lissome, and lithe."

Kempton was married to movie producer Harrison Starr, who was 13 years older than she was. Kempton later described Starr as "a male supremacist in the style of Norman Mailer." The marriage ended after her feminist period. In an interview in the late 1990s she said, "By the time I gave them up, I'd pretty much tasted them... I saw their limitations for me. Couple relationships are a great part of the path for many people. For me, they tended to be obstructive. Of course, any choice you make in life has its pros and cons. When you give up partnership relationships you also give up a certain kind of intimacy. But you gain a lot of freedom, and you also experience a wider, less exclusive form of love."

One of Kempton's brothers and his wife, a college friend of Kempton, were killed in a car crash in 1971.

In later years Kempton became quite close to her father, and when he contracted pancreatic cancer she was with him every day until he died.

Kempton died on July 10, 2023, at the age of 80, at her home in Carmel, Calif. Her brother said the cause was heart failure, and that she had suffered from a chronic lung condition.

== Bibliography ==
- The Heart of Meditation (2002)
- Meditation for the Love of It: Enjoying Your Own Deepest Experience (2011)
- Awakening Shakti: The Transformative Power of the Goddesses of Yoga (2013)
