= Dennis Bell (journalist) =

American journalist (1948-1995)

- Born: August 29, 1948; Muskegon, Michigan, U.S.
- Died: March 14, 1995 (aged 46)
- Occupation: journalist
- Spouse: Jacqueline Bell

Dennis Bell (August 29 1948 – March 14, 1995) was an American journalist, best known for his award-winning series of the articles on famine in Ethiopia in 1984 for Newsday.

== Early life and education ==
Bell was born in Muskegon, Michigan to Ezra Douglas and Natalie VanArsdale Bell. After enlisting in the United States Army in 1968, he attended the University of Michigan for his post-secondary education in 1970. Bell attended Hofstra University for free because he worked as a school custodian. In addition, he joined the summer program for minority journalists at the Institute for Journalism Education at the University of California, Berkeley in Berkeley, California.

== Career ==
After joining Newsday's team in 1972, he held different positions including porter clerk and pressroom reporter while finally getting foreign assignments. One of them covered the famine in Ethiopia in 1984, together with reporter Josh Friedman and photographer Ozier Muhammad. A year after, they won the Pulitzer Prize for International Reporting in 1985. Bell later transferred to Newsday's Long Island desk, where he held the position of the assistant Suffolk County editor. Bell died of congestive heart failure and pneumonia at the age of 46.

== Books ==
- Fischer (2014). Foreign Correspondents Report From Africa: Pulitzer Prize Winning Articles and Pictures. Vienna: LIT Verlag Münster. p. 189. ISBN 9783643904416.
