= Ozier Muhammad =

American photojournalist

- Born: 1950 (age 75–76); United States
- Occupation: Photojournalist
- Children: Khalil Gibran Muhammad (son)
- Relatives: Elijah Muhammad (grandfather)
- Website: oziermuhammad.com

Ozier Muhammad (born 1950) is an American photojournalist who was on the staff of The New York Times from 1992 to 2014. He has also worked for Ebony Magazine, The Charlotte Observer, and Newsday. He earned a B.A. in 1972 in photography from Columbia College Chicago.

In 1984, Muhammad won the George Polk Award for News Photography.

As a photographer for Newsday, Muhammad shared the 1985 Pulitzer Prize for International Reporting with Joshua Friedman and Dennis Bell "for their series on the plight of the hungry in Africa."

He was selected as a photographer for the 1990 project Songs of My People.

Muhammad's work was included in the 2025 exhibition Photography and the Black Arts Movement, 1955–1985 at the National Gallery of Art.

== Personal ==
Muhammad is a grandson of Elijah Muhammad, a founder of the Nation of Islam.

He was formerly married to Dr. Kimberly Muhammad-Earl, a director of special projects at the Chicago Board of Education.
