= Murray Kempton =

American journalist

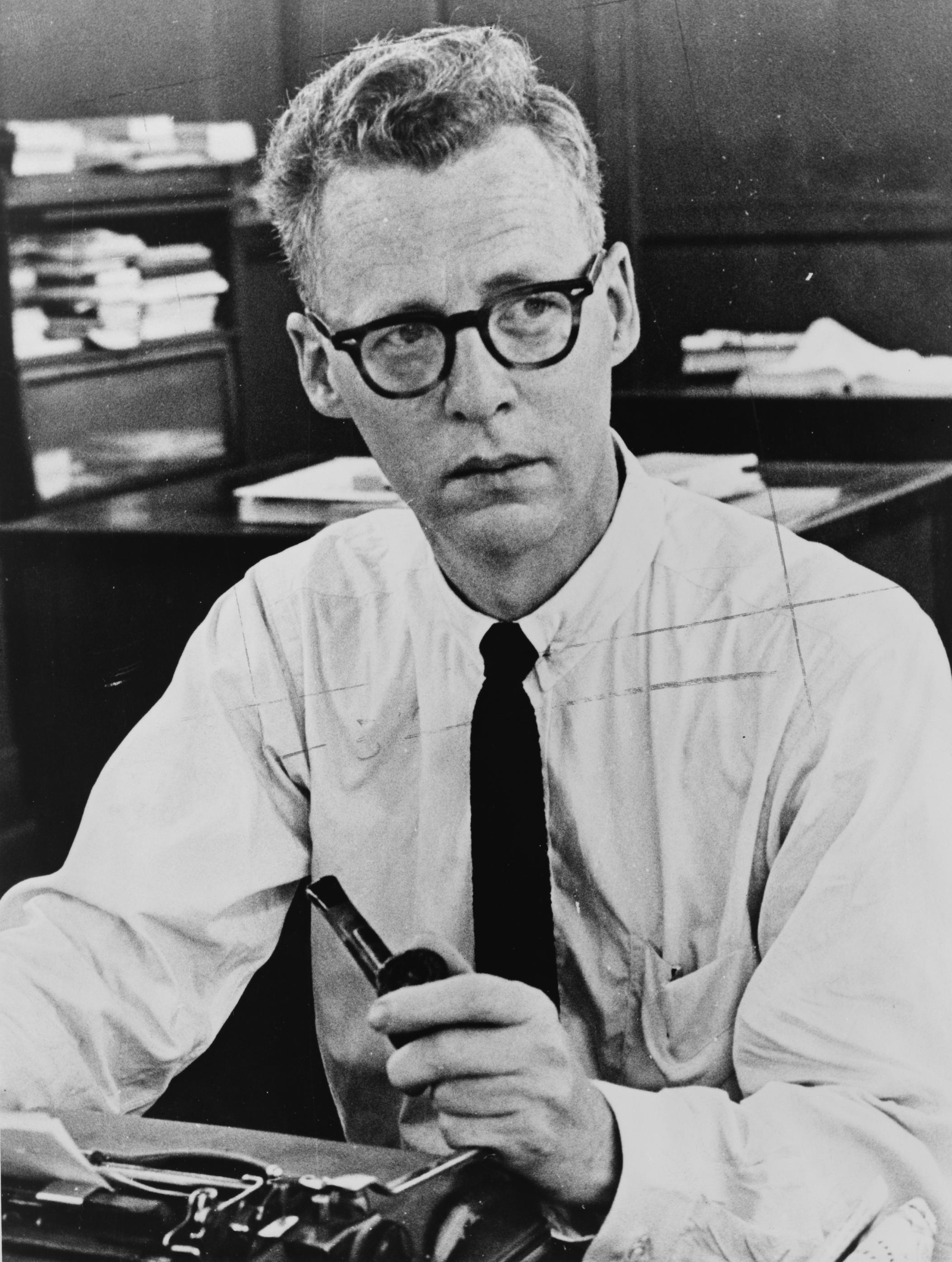
Murray Kempton

James Murray Kempton (December 16, 1917 – May 5, 1997) was an American journalist and social and political commentator. He won a National Book Award in 1974 (category, "Contemporary Affairs") for The Briar Patch: The People of the State of New York versus Lumumba Shakur, et al. Reprinted, 1997, with new subtitle The Trial of the Panther 21. He won a Pulitzer Prize (category, "Commentary") in 1985 "for witty and insightful reflection on public issues in 1984 and throughout a distinguished career."

== Biography ==
Murray Kempton was born on December 16, 1917, in Baltimore, Maryland, the only child of Sally Ambler and James Branson Kempton, a stock broker, who died when Murray was three years of age. Kempton worked as a copyboy for H. L. Mencken at the Baltimore Evening Sun. He entered Johns Hopkins in 1935, where he was editor-in-chief of the Johns Hopkins News-Letter.

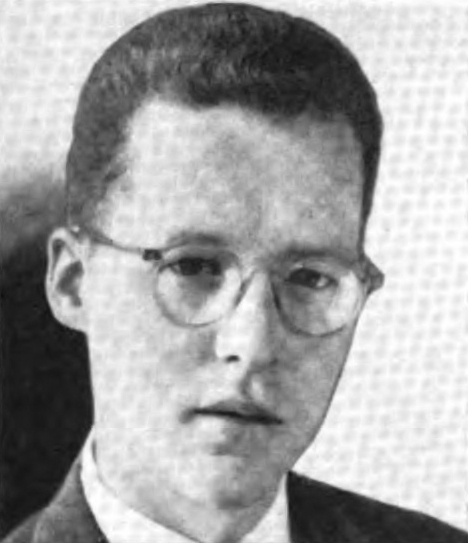
Kempton c. 1950

After his graduation in 1939, he worked for a short time as a labor organizer, then joined the staff of the New York Post, earning a reputation for a quietly elegant prose style that featured long but rhythmic sentences, a flair for irony, and gentle, almost scholarly sarcasm. He served in the U.S. Army Air Forces during World War II and was stationed in New Guinea and the Philippines. He rejoined New York Post in 1949 as labor editor and later as a columnist. He won a Hillman Prize in 1950 for his contributions to journalism. He also wrote for the NYC-based World-Telegram and Sun and a short-lived successor, the World Journal Tribune, a merger between the Telegram, the New York Herald-Tribune, and the New York Journal American. His 1955 book Part of Our Time: Some Ruins and Monuments of the Thirties was a farewell to his youthful Communism. During 1958 and '59 he spent a year in Rome on a scholarship of the U.S.-Italy Fulbright Commission.

During the 1960s he edited The New Republic. He penned the introduction to Richard H. Popkin's 1966 book The Second Oswald, which was critical of the Warren Commission. He returned to the New York Post yet again in 1977 after it was bought by Rupert Murdoch. In 1981, he became a columnist for Newsday, the Long Island-based daily. Additionally, Kempton was also a regular contributor to The New York Review of Books, Esquire magazine, CBS's Spectrum radio opinion series, and National Review, the conservative magazine with whose editor, William F. Buckley, Jr., Kempton had enjoyed a longtime friendship that grew from their ideological rivalry.

External videos
- Booknotes interview with Kempton on Rebellions, Perversities, and Main Events, July 3, 1994, C-SPAN

He never learned to drive and could often be spotted riding a bicycle in New York City while wearing a three-piece suit. He was shown that way in television spots that promoted the New York edition of Newsday in which Kempton brought his bicycle to a stop at an intersection and deadpanned, "I guess I've been around so long that people think they have to like me." His bicycling was also depicted in a cartoon showing him standing next to his three-speed bicycle that accompanied a 1993 profile in The New Yorker and later the jacket of what proved to be his final book, an anthology called Rebellions, Perversities, and Main Events. Kempton dedicated the book to Buckley, who, he once admitted, had nagged him for years to assemble the collection: "For William F. Buckley, Jr., genius at friendships that surpass all understanding."

Kempton received one of the first Hillman Prizes in 1950 for his articles on labor in the South. Kempton won the Pulitzer Prize for distinguished commentary in 1985 at Newsday. Ten years later, he received the Elijah Parish Lovejoy Award as well as an honorary Doctor of Laws degree from Colby College. He was so known for his rococo style that in his essay collection Hooking Up (2000), Tom Wolfe wrote, "Kempton used so many elegant British double and triple negatives, half the time you couldn't figure out what he was saying."

Kempton wrote approximately 10,000 entries for his columns over the course of his career. He died on May 5, 1997, at Kateri Nursing Home in Manhattan at the age of 79 while suffering from pancreatic cancer.

He was the father of Sally Kempton.

== Writing style ==
Kempton's writing was often described as "baroque". His sentences were often long and composed of dependent clauses, and he used an elevated vocabulary. Most of the time he covered issues relevant to New York. Explaining his focus on the city, he said, "I walk wide of the cosmic and settle most happily for the local." Journalist David Halberstam credited Kempton with pioneering the genre of New Journalism through his "short story"-like installments in his columns.

== Writings ==
=== Books ===
- Socialism now! : democracy's only defense (1941)
- Part of Our Time: Some Ruins and Monuments of the Thirties (1955, repr. 1998, repr. 2004)
- America Comes of Middle Age: Columns 1950-1962 (1963)
- The Briar Patch: The People of the State of New York versus Lumumba Shakur, et al. (1973); Repr. as: The Briar Patch: The Trial of the Panther 21, Da Capo Press (1997) — 1974 National Book Award, Contemporary Affairs
- Rebellions, Perversities, and Main Events (1994)
- Going Around: Selected Journalism (2025)

=== Introductions ===
- Introduction to Popkin, Richard H. (1966). The Second Oswald. Avon Books.
