= Brian Donovan (journalist) =

American journalist

- Born: March 11, 1941; Syracuse, New York
- Died: June 20, 2018 (aged 77)
- Education: Syracuse University
- Spouse: Ellen Kanner
- Children: 2

Brian Donovan (March 11, 1941 – June 20, 2018) was an American journalist for Newsday who won the Pulitzer Prize twice, in 1970 and in 1995. He was inducted into the Press Club of Long Island's Hall of Fame.

== Biography ==
Donovan was born on March 11, 1941, in Syracuse, New York, and had one sibling. His parents were William Donovan, a commercial insurance agent, and Marion Donovan. He earned his bachelor's degree in journalism from the S. I. Newhouse School of Public Communications of Syracuse University. Donovan was married to Ellen Kanner, with whom he had two children.

== Career ==
He first worked for three years at the Rochester Democrat & Chronicle, and was then hired by Newsday in 1967. He retired from Newsday in 2002 to focus on a book, "Hard Driving" about NASCAR driver Wendell Scott.
