= Silent No More (book) =

2012 book by Aaron Fisher

Silent No More: Victim 1's Fight for Justice Against Jerry Sandusky
- Author: Aaron Fisher, Michael Gillum, and Dawn Daniels
- Language: English
- Genre: Non-fiction
- Publisher: Ballantine Books
- Publication date: October 23, 2012
- Pages: 240
- ISBN: 978-0345544162

Silent No More: Victim 1's Fight for Justice Against Jerry Sandusky is a 2012 book by Aaron Fisher, identified as "Victim 1" in the Penn State child sex abuse scandal. Fisher is called "Victim 1" because it was his reporting his abuse to high school officials that set off the investigation that led to Sandusky's conviction. The book follows Fisher's experience from the beginning of his interaction with Jerry Sandusky at The Second Mile through Sandusky's conviction of 45 of 48 counts related to child sex abuse.

Fisher's psychologist, Michael Gillum, was a co-author of the book, writing 21 of 30 chapters; Fisher and his mother wrote the other 9. Fisher said that he wrote the book with the hopes of encouraging all victims of abuse to come forward. Fisher revealed that he had contemplated suicide during the 3-year-long investigation. The Patriot News reporter Sara Ganim, who won a 2012 Pulitzer Prize for Local Reporting for her reporting on the Sandusky scandal, raised issues with the fact-checking quality of the book, which she described as "[hitting] shelves just four months after Sandusky’s conviction, and it shows."

Fisher sat for an interview with Christopher Cuomo on 20/20 shortly before the book was released.
