= Newsday =

American daily newspaper founded in 1940

- The front page of Newsday on February 21, 2012
- Type: Daily newspaper
- Format: Tabloid
- Owner(s): Newsday Media (Patrick Dolan)
- Publisher: Debby Krenek
- Editor: Don Hudson
- Founded: September 3, 1940; 86 years ago
- Headquarters: 6 Corporate Center Drive; Melville, New York, U.S. 11747
- Circulation: 67,300 average print circulation 47,000 digital subscribers
- ISSN: 0278-5587
- OCLC number: 5371847
- Website: newsday.com

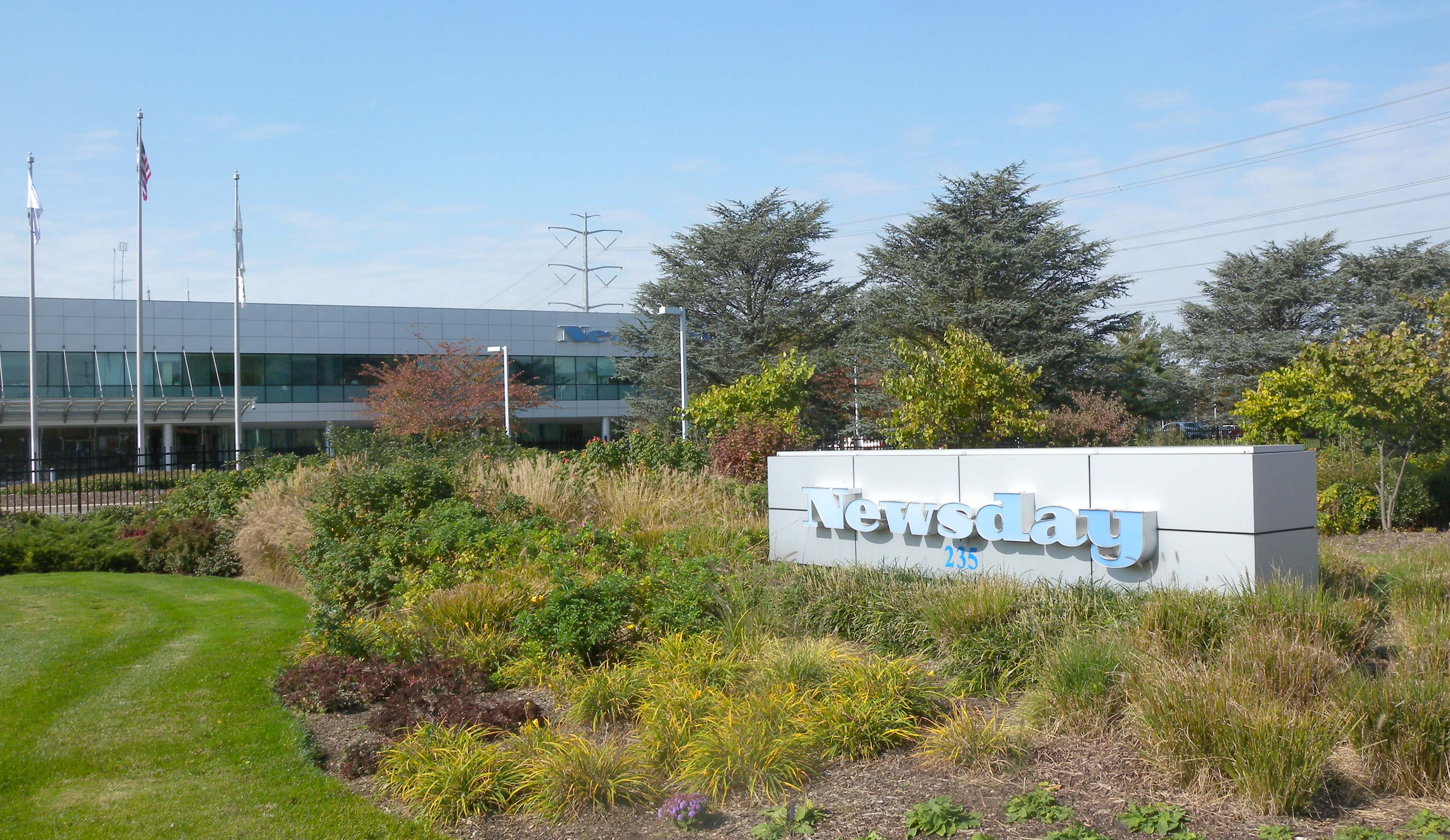
Newsday's headquarters in Melville, New York

The Newsday logo in 2007

The Newsday logo in 2009

Newsday is a daily newspaper in the United States primarily serving Nassau and Suffolk counties on Long Island, New York, although it is also sold throughout the New York metropolitan area. The slogan of the newspaper is "Your Eye on LI", and formerly it was "The Long Island Newspaper". The newspaper's headquarters is located in Melville, New York.

Since its founding in 1940, Newsday has won 19 Pulitzer Prizes. Historically, it penetrated the New York City market. As of 2025, Newsday is the sixth-largest circulation newspaper in the United States with a print circulation of 67,300.

== History ==
=== 20th century ===
Newsday was founded by Alicia Patterson and her husband, Harry Guggenheim. Its first edition on September 3, 1940, was published from Hempstead.

Until undergoing a major redesign in the 1970s, Newsday copied the Daily News format of short stories and numerous pictures. Patterson was fired as a writer at her father's Daily News in her early 20s after getting the basic facts of a divorce wrong in a published report. She later went on to publish and edit Newsday. Following Patterson's death in 1963, Guggenheim became publisher and editor.

In 1967, Guggenheim turned over the publisher position to Bill Moyers and continued as president and editor-in-chief. But Guggenheim was disappointed by the liberal drift of the newspaper under Moyers, criticizing what he called the "left-wing" coverage of the anti-Vietnam War protests.

The two ultimately split over the 1968 presidential election, with Guggenheim authoring an editorial supporting Richard Nixon when Moyers supported Hubert Humphrey.

In 1970, Guggenheim sold his majority share to the then-conservative Times-Mirror Company over the attempt of newspaper employees to block the sale, even though Moyers offered $10 million more than the Times-Mirror purchase price; Moyers resigned a few days later. Guggenheim, who died a year later, had Moyers removed from his will.

After the competing Long Island Press (not to be confused with the alternative weekly of the same name) ceased publication in 1977, Newsday launched a separate Queens edition, followed by a New York City edition dubbed New York Newsday. In June 2000, Times Mirror merged with the Tribune Company, partnering Newsday with the New York City television station WPIX, also owned by Tribune.

With the Times Mirror-Tribune merger, the newspaper founded by Alicia Patterson was now owned by the company that was founded by her great-grandfather, Joseph Medill, who owned the Chicago Tribune and, until 1991, also owned her father's Daily News. Tribune sold the Daily News to British newspaper magnate Robert Maxwell.

Following Maxwell's death in 1992, the family publishing empire collapsed, and Mortimer Zuckerman purchased the Daily News.

=== 21st century ===
In April 2008, News Corporation, headed by CEO Rupert Murdoch, attempted to purchase Newsday for US$580 million. This was followed by a matching bid from Zuckerman and a $680 million bid from Cablevision.

In May 2008, News Corporation withdrew its bid, and on May 12, 2008, Newsday reported that Cablevision would purchase the paper for $650 million. The sale was completed July 29, 2008.

In 2016, Altice, a Dutch multinational telecommunications company, acquired Cablevision, including Newsday and News 12. However, Altice then sold a majority (75%) stake in Newsday back to Cablevision's former owner Charles Dolan and his son Patrick, making Patrick the CEO of Newsday. Altice disposed of its remaining stake in Newsday at the end of July 2018, which, combined with Charles Dolan's transfer of shares to son Patrick, made Patrick the sole owner of Newsday.

In July 2020, Newsday received $10 million in federal government loans from Paycheck Protection Program during the COVID-19 pandemic to pay salaries for 500 employees.

In 2022, Don Hudson was named editor.

In March 2023, Newsday launched NewsdayTV, featuring former News 12 Networks anchor Elisa DiStefano. NewsdayTV is available online and through major streaming outlets. NewsdayTV takes a similar approach to news as other Long Island news outlets such as News12.

== Editorial style ==
Despite having a tabloid format, Newsday is not known for being sensationalistic, as are other local daily tabloids, such as the New York Daily News and the New York Post. This causes Newsday to sometimes be referred to as "the respectable tabloid".

In 2004, the alternative weekly newspaper Long Island Press (which is not related to the defunct daily of the same name) wrote that Newsday has used its clout to influence local politics in Nassau and Suffolk Counties.

Bill Moyers briefly served as publisher. During the tenure of publisher Robert M. Johnson in the 1980s, Newsday made a major push into New York City. The paper's roster of columnists and critics has included Cathy Young, Jimmy Breslin, Barbara Garson, Normand Poirier, Murray Kempton, Gail Collins, Pete Hamill, Sydney Schanberg, Robert Reno (died 2012), Jim Dwyer, sportswriter Mike Lupica, music critic Tim Page, and television critic Marvin Kitman. The paper featured both advice columnists Ann Landers and Dear Abby for several years.

From 1985 to 2005, Michael Mandelbaum wrote a regular foreign affairs analysis column for Newsday. Writer and biographer Robert Caro was an investigative reporter. Its features section has included television reporters Verne Gay and Diane Werts, TV/film feature writer Frank Lovece, and film critic Rafer Guzman. Newsday carries the syndicated columnist Froma Harrop. Pulitzer Prize winner Walt Handelsman's editorial political cartoons animation are a nationally syndicated feature of Newsday. In the 1980s, a new design director, Robert Eisner, guided the transition into digital design and color printing.

Newsday created and sponsored a "Long Island at the Crossroads" advisory board in 1978, to recommend regional goals, supervise local government, and liaison with state and Federal officials. It lasted approximately a decade.

On March 21, 2011, Newsday redesigned its front page, scrapping the nameplate and font used since the 1960s in favor of a sans-serif wordmark.

== Circulation ==
In 2004, a circulation scandal revealed that the paper's daily and Sunday circulation had been inflated by 16.9% and 14.5%, respectively, in the auditing period September 30, 2002, to September 30, 2003. The Audit Bureau of Circulation adjusted average weekday circulation to 481,816 from 579,599; average Saturday circulation to 392,649 from 416,830; and average Sunday circulation to 574,081 from 671,820, and instituted twice-yearly audits.

In 2008, Newsday was ranked 10th in terms of newspaper circulation in the United States.

On October 28, 2009, Newsday changed its web site to a paid-subscriber only model. Newsday.com would open its front page, classified ads, movie listings, and school closings to all site visitors, but access beyond this content would require a weekly fee – US$5 as of 2010. This fee would be waived for subscribers of the print edition of the paper, as well as for subscribers to parent-company Cablevision's Internet service. Through its first three months only 35 non-Optimum, non-Newsday subscribers signed up for the paid website.

== Pulitzer Prizes ==
Newsday has won 19 Pulitzer Prizes and has been a finalist for 20 additional (if no individual is listed, award is for Newsday staff):

- 1954: Public Service (Winner)
- 1970: Public Service (Winner)
- 1970: Editorial Cartooning (Winner) — Thomas F. Darcy
- 1974: Public Service (Winner)
- 1974: Criticism (Winner) — Emily Genauer, Newsday Syndicate
- 1980: Local Investigative Specialized Reporting (Finalist) — Carole E. Agus, Andrew V. Fetherston Jr., and Frederick J. Tuccillo
- 1982: International Reporting (Finalist) — Bob Wyrick
- 1982: Criticism (Finalist) — Marvin Kitman
- 1984: Local General or Spot News Reporting (Winner)
- 1984: International Reporting (Finalist) — Morris Thompson
- 1984: Criticism (Finalist) — Dan Cryer
- 1985: International Reporting (Winner) — Josh Friedman, Dennis Bell, and Ozier Muhammad
- 1985: Commentary (Winner) — Murray Kempton
- 1986: Feature Writing (Finalist) — Irene Virag
- 1989: Investigative Reporting (Finalist) — Penny Loeb
- 1990: Specialized Reporting (Finalist) – Jim Dwyer
- 1991: Spot News Reporting (Finalist)
- 1991: Spot News Photography (Finalist)
- 1992: Spot News Reporting (Winner)
- 1992: International Reporting (Winner) — Patrick J. Sloyan
- 1993: International Reporting (Winner) — Roy Gutman
- 1994: Explanatory Journalism (Finalist)
- 1995: Investigative Reporting (Winner) — Brian Donovan and Stephanie Saul
- 1995: Commentary (Winner) — Jim Dwyer
- 1996: Explanatory Journalism (Winner) — Laurie Garrett
- 1996: Beat Reporting (Winner) — Bob Keeler
- 1996: International Reporting (Finalist) — Laurie Garrett
- 1997: Spot News Reporting (Winner)
- 1998: Beat Reporting (Finalist) — Laurie Garrett
- 1999: Criticism (Finalist) — Justin Davidson
- 1999: Editorial Writing (Finalist) — Lawrence C. Levy
- 2002: Criticism (Winner) — Justin Davidson
- 2004: Breaking News Reporting (Finalist)
- 2005: International Reporting (Winner) — Dele Olojede
- 2005: Explanatory Reporting (Finalist)
- 2007: Editorial Cartooning (Winner) — Walt Handelsman
- 2008: Public Service (Finalist) — Jennifer Barrios, Sophia Chang, Michael R. Ebert, Reid J. Epstein, Jennifer Sinco Kelleher, Eden Laikin, Herbert Lowe, Joseph Mallia, Jennifer Maloney, Luis Perez and Karla Schuster
- 2013: Editorial Writing (Finalist) — Editorial Board staff
- 2014: Public Service (Finalist)

== In popular culture ==
- 1969: The novel Naked Came the Stranger is written as a literary hoax poking fun at contemporary American culture. Although credited to "Penelope Ashe", it was in fact written by a group of 24 journalists led by Newsday columnist Mike McGrady, who intended to author a deliberately terrible book with a lot of sex to illustrate the point that popular American literary culture had become mindlessly vulgar. The book fulfilled the authors' expectations and became a bestseller in 1969; they revealed the hoax later that year, further spurring the book's popularity.
- 1985: In the comedy/thriller Compromising Positions, the lead character, played by Susan Sarandon, is a former Newsday journalist who is trying to reestablish her career by selling a freelance story to the publication.
- 1986: In the Crocodile Dundee films, Linda Kozlowski's character, reporter Sue Charlton, works at Newsday.
- 1996: The episode "The Homer They Fall" in season eight of The Simpsons quotes Newsday calling boxing "the cruelest sport".
- 1996 to 2005: In the CBS sitcom Everybody Loves Raymond, the fictional character Ray Barone played by Ray Romano is employed by Newsday as a sportswriter.
- 2016: In the documentary Three Identical Strangers, former editor Howard Schneider discusses Newsday's coverage of three young men who discovered they were separated as infants.
