= Stephanie Welsh =

American photographer and midwife

- Born: June 27, 1973 (age 51); Quantico, Virginia
- Known for: Photography
- Awards: Pulitzer Prize for Feature Photography (1996)

Stephanie Welsh (born 27 June 1973) is an American photographer turned midwife. While in journalism, Welsh worked for the Daily Nation in Nairobi and The Palm Beach Post in the 1990s. During her photography career, Welsh became the youngest person to win a Pulitzer Prize when she won the 1996 Pulitzer Prize for Feature Photography for her photographs on a Kenyan female genital mutilation. After leaving photography for nursing, Welsh worked as a midwife and academic. In the 2010s, Welsh was the secretary of the American College of Nurse Midwives from 2014 to 2015 before her promotion to vice president.

== Early life and education ==
Welsh was born on 27 June 1973 in Quantico, Virginia. She completed a Bachelor of Science at Syracuse University in December 1995 and a Master of Science at Yale University in 2002.

== Career ==
Welsh began her career as a newspaper intern in Syracuse before moving to Nairobi to work at the Daily Nation in 1994. She returned to the United States in 1996 to become a photographer for The Palm Beach Post and remained with the newspaper until 1999. After retiring from photography, Welsh became a midwife at an ob/gyn in Mansfield, Connecticut. During her nursing career, Welsh taught at multiple universities including the University of Connecticut and Georgetown University. Outside of teaching, she was a secretary for the Connecticut branch of the American College of Nurse Midwives from 2014 to 2015 before being promoted to vice president.

== Awards and honors ==
Welsh won the 1996 Pulitzer Prize for Feature Photography for her photographs of a female genital mutilation in Kenya. Age 22 at the time of her award, she is the youngest person to win a Pulitzer. Her Kenyan circumcision photos won second place during the 1996 World Press Photo contest in the People in the News category. Welsh's photographs were added to the compilations of photos held at the Newseum and St. Lawrence University.
