= List of members of the North Carolina Sports Hall of Fame =

Athletes, coaches, and journalists who have been inducted into the North Carolina Sports Hall of Fame.

== A ==
- Charlie Adams
- Skip Alexander
- Johnny Allen
- Maxine Allen
- Donna Andrews
- Debbie Antonelli
- Herb Appenzeller
- Luke Appling
- Missouri Arledge
- Gerald Austin
- Dugan Aycock

== B ==
- Elzie "Buck" Baker
- Dr. Lenox Baker
- John Baker, Jr.
- Scott Bankhead
- George Barclay
- Frank Barger
- Billy Ray Barnes
- Ernie Barnes
- Ronnie Barnes
- Smith Barrier
- Bob Bartholomew
- Glenn Bass
- Genia Beasley
- Jim Beatty
- Chip Beck
- Bobby Bell
- Peggy Kirk Bell
- Walt Bellamy
- Heather Bergsma
- Connie Mack Berry
- Elvin Bethea
- Henry Bibby
- Eddie Biedenbach
- Furman Bisher
- Russell Blunt
- Muggsy Bogues
- Jeff Bostic
- Joe Bostic
- Willie Bradshaw
- Louis Breeden
- Pete Brennan
- Cary Brewbaker
- Eddie Bridges
- Rod Brind'Amour
- Dave Bristol
- Rod Broadway
- Leon Brogden
- Bill Brooks
- Dan Brooks
- Hal Brown
- Mack Brown
- Ted Brown
- Wilt Browning
- Charlie Bryant
- Kelvin Bryant
- Vic Bubas
- Al Buehler
- Willie Burden
- Forrest "Smokey" Burgess
- Tommy Burleson
- Marge Burns
- Tom Butters
- Dennis Byrd
- Tommy Byrne

== C ==
- Mike Caldwell
- Eddie Cameron
- Chris Cammack
- Wray Carlton
- A. J. Carr
- M.L. Carr
- Gordon Carver
- Everett Case
- Willis Casey
- Peggy Pate Chappell
- Joey Cheek
- Castleman D. Chesley
- Wes Chesson
- Joe Cheves
- Richard Childress
- Jimmy Clack
- Dwight Clark
- George Clark
- Wilburn Clary
- Tony Cloninger
- John Clougherty
- Jack Cobb
- Whit Cobb
- Bob Colvin
- Freddie Combs
- Jack Coombs
- Gene Corrigan
- Billy Cox
- Dennis Craddock
- Roger Craig
- Fred Crawford
- Alvin Crowder
- Carlester Crumpler, Sr.

== D ==
- Brad Daugherty
- Tom Davis
- Walter Davis
- Randy Denton
- John Derr
- Prince Nufer Dixon
- Bill Dooley
- Jim Donnan
- Anson Dorrance
- Al Dowtin
- Jim Duncan
- Laura DuPont
- Dwight Durante
- Woody Durham

== E ==
- Dale Earnhardt
- Dale Earnhardt Jr.
- Earle Edwards
- Carl Eller
- Chuck Erickson
- Sam Esposito
- Bill Eutsler

== F ==
- Joe Ferebee
- Rick Ferrell
- Wes Ferrell
- Bob Fetzer
- Mindy Ballou Fitzpatrick
- Darrell Floyd
- Sleepy Floyd
- Raymond Floyd
- Peter Fogarassy
- Phil Ford
- David Fox
- Mike Fox
- Skeeter Francis
- Ron Francis
- Russ Frazier
- Rabbit Fulghum
- Eunies Futch

== G ==
- Roman Gabriel
- Steve Gabriel
- Clarence "Bighouse" Gaines
- Bob Gantt
- Mary Garber
- Wade Garrett
- Jim Garrison
- Paul Gay
- Betty Springs Geiger
- Claude Gibson
- Lee Gliarmis
- Mike Gminski
- Billy Goodman
- Murray Greason
- Ron Green, Sr.
- Bill Guthridge

== H ==
- Jesse Haddock
- Ellis "Dumpy" Hagler
- Leonard Hamilton
- Tyler Hansbrough
- Marshall Happer
- Dee Hardison
- Bob Harris
- Dave Harris
- Leo Hart
- Charlie Harville
- Sylvia Hatchell
- H. C. "Joby" Hawn
- Bill Hayes
- Clayton Heafner
- Bunn Hearn
- Tommy Helms
- Dickie Hemric
- Rick Hendrick
- Bill Hensley
- Dick Herbert
- Dan Hill
- Bobby Hodges
- Terry Holland
- Jack Holley
- Torry Holt
- Gene Hooks
- Babe Howell
- Lou Hudson
- Ken Huff
- Jim "Catfish" Hunter
- Richard Huntley

== I ==
- Cal Irvin
- John Isner

== J ==
- Carl James
- Bob Jamieson
- Antawn Jamison
- Dale Jarrett
- Ned Jarrett
- Haywood Jeffires
- Jack Jensen
- Freddy Johnson
- Robert Glenn "Junior" Johnson
- Bobby Jones
- Charlie Jones
- Lenora Jones
- Paul Jones
- Sam Jones
- Steve Jones
- Eckie Jordan
- Michael Jordan
- Christian "Sonny" Jurgensen
- Charlie "Choo Choo" Justice

== K ==
- Dee Kantner
- Charles Kernodle Jr.
- Clyde King
- Jack King
- Marion Kirby
- Gordon "Chubby" Kirkland
- Mike Krzyzewski

== L ==
- Max Lanier
- Luther Lassiter
- Page Marsh Lea
- Norvell Lee
- Meadowlark Lemon
- Walter "Buck" Leonard
- John "Buddy" Lewis
- Larry Lindsey
- Gene Littles
- Carroll "Whitey" Lockman
- Henry Logan
- Davis Love III
- John Lucas
- James Lytle

== M ==
- Johnny Mackorell
- Glenn E.(Ted) Mann
- Jack Marin
- Page Marsh
- Mike Martin
- Bob Matheson
- Cedric Maxwell
- Jakie May
- Bob McAdoo
- George McAfee
- Fred McCall
- Don McCauley
- Dr. Angus "Monk" McDonald
- Jack McDowall
- Jerry McGee
- Jerry McGee
- Mike McGee
- Neill McGeachy
- Rich McGeorge
- Jack McKeon
- Horace "Bones" McKinney
- John McLendon
- Kathy McMillan
- Henry Lee "Spec" Meadows
- Chasity Melvin
- Paul Miller
- Jim Mills
- Sam Mills
- Sam Moir
- Vic Molodet
- Jerry Moore
- Dale Morey
- Allen Morris
- Mac Morris
- Hugh Morton
- John Henry Moss
- Jeff Mullins
- Jack Murdock
- Bill Murray

== N ==
- Fred "Curly" Neal
- Timmy Newsome
- Trot Nixon

== O ==
- John "Red" O’Quinn
- Dave Odom
- Carla Overbeck
- Gene Overby
- Thell Overman
- Kristi Overton Johnson

== P ==
- Billy Packer
- Estelle Lawson Page
- Arnold Palmer
- Johnny Palmer
- Tom Parham
- Ace Parker
- Billy Joe Patton
- Add Penfield
- Julius Peppers
- Gaylord Perry
- Jim Perry
- Lindsay J. "Hap" Perry
- Lee Petty
- Richard Petty
- Eddie Pope
- Pat Preston
- Ray Price
- Al Proctor
- Rick Proehl
- Lou Pucillo
- Jethro Pugh
- Bobby Purcell

== Q ==
- Mike Quick
- Bob Quincy

== R ==
- Walter Rabb
- Shea Ralph
- Sam Ranzino
- Lenox Rawlings
- Ray Reeve
- Harvey Reid Jr.
- Steve Rerych
- Jerry Richardson
- Herman Riddick
- Jim Ritcher
- Dave Robbins
- Oliver "Bo" Roddey Jr.
- Francis Rogalio
- Rodney Rogers
- Judy Rose
- Lennie Rosenbluth
- Donald Ross

== S ==
- Kelvin Sampson
- Charlie Sanders
- Lee Shaffer
- Joel Shankle
- Ronnie Shavlik
- Julie Shea-Graw
- Marty Sheets
- Karen Shelton
- Wallace Shelton
- Ernie Shore
- Charlie Sifford
- Dave Sime
- Tony Simeon
- Floyd Simmons
- Paul Simson
- Enos "Country" Slaughter
- Norm Sloan
- Irwin Smallwood
- Belus Smawley
- Charlotte Smith
- Dean Smith
- Earl Smith
- Steve Smith Sr.
- Vic Sorrell
- Mildred Southern
- Jack Stallings
- Clarence Stasavich
- Jim Staton
- Jerry Steele
- Tim Stevens
- Andrea Stinson
- Lee Stone
- Tom Suiter
- Ben Sutton
- Ed Sutton
- John Swofford
- Paul Sykes

== T ==
- Danny Talbott
- Simon Terrell
- Herb Thomas
- David Thompson
- Jerry Tolley
- Henry Trevathan
- Caulton Tudor
- Richard Tufts

== V ==
- Steve Vacendak
- Jim Valvano
- Bobby Vaughan

== W ==
- Jake Wade
- Wallace Wade
- Tony Waldrop
- Peahead Walker
- LeRoy Walker
- Michael Gerard "Mickey" Walsh
- Susan Walsh
- Harvie Ward
- Bob Waters
- Roger Watson
- Jim Weaver
- Frank Weedon
- Art Weiner
- Joe West
- Humpy Wheeler
- Stephanie Wheeler
- Alan White
- Burgess Whitehead
- George Whitfield
- Fred Whitfield
- Hoyt Wilhelm
- Doug Wilkerson
- Charles "Buck" Williams
- George Williams
- Roy Williams
- Harry Williamson
- Shirley Wilson
- Jerry Winterton
- Donnell Woolford
- James Worthy
- Taft Wright

== Y ==
- Pep Young
- Kay Yow
- Susan Yow
- Virgil Yow
- Deborah A. Yow-Bowden

== Z ==
- Jonathan Thompson "Tom" Zachary

== See also ==
- North Carolina Sports Hall of Fame
