= James Garrison =

James Garrison may refer to:

- James Garrison (architect) (born 1953), American architect and educator
- James R. Garrison (1838 –1908), Union Navy sailor and Medal of Honor recipient
- James D. Garrison, American historian of literature
- Jim Garrison (1921–1992), Louisiana district attorney, known for his investigations into the assassination of President John F. Kennedy
- Jim Garrison (American football) (1933–2015), American football coach
- Jimmy Garrison (1934–1976), American jazz double bassist
