= Fred Whitfield =

Fred Whitfield may refer to:

- Fred Whitfield (baseball)
- Fred Whitfield (rodeo)
- Fred Whitfield (executive)
