= List of High Point Panthers men's basketball seasons =

The High Point Panthers men's basketball team has been competing since 1927.

== Season-by-season results ==
Statistics overview
Season	Coach	Overall	Conference	Standing	Postseason
J.P. Boylin (1927–1930)
1927–28	J.P. Boylin	14–4			
1928–29	J.P. Boylin	15–7			
1929–30	J.P. Boylin	10–5			
J.P. Boylin:		39–16 (.709)			
Julian Beall (North State Conference) (1930–1932)
1930–31	Julian Beall	9–10			
1931–32	Julian Beall	7–11			
Julian Beall:		16–21 (.432)			
Virgil Yow (North State Conference) (1932–1945)
1932–33	Virgil Yow	11–10			
1933–34	Virgil Yow	18–10			
1934–35	Virgil Yow	18–4			
1935–36	Virgil Yow	20–4			
1936–37	Virgil Yow	18–6			
1937–38	Virgil Yow	14–8			
1938–39	Virgil Yow	21–5			NAIA Tournament first round
1939–40	Virgil Yow	21–8			
1940–41	Virgil Yow	18–7			
1941–42	Virgil Yow	25–2			NAIA Tournament second round
1942–43	Virgil Yow	7–15			
1943–44	Virgil Yow	10–7			
1944–45	Virgil Yow	10–17			
Ralph James (North State Conference) (1945–1950)
1945–46	Ralph James	12–15			NAIA Tournament first round
1946–47	Ralph James	14–8			
1947–48	Ralph James	15–6			
1948–49	Ralph James	16–8			
1949–50	Ralph James	25–2			
Ralph James:		81–45 (.643)			
Bob Davis (North State Conference) (1950–1953)
1950–51	Bob Davis	19–11			
1951–52	Bob Davis	20–10			
1952–53	Bob Davis	17–13			
Bob Davis:		56–36 (.609)			
Virgil Yow (North State Conference) (1950–1953)
1953–54	Virgil Yow	7–23			
1954–55	Virgil Yow	14–17			
1955–56	Virgil Yow	16–17			
1956–57	Virgil Yow	20–10			
1957–58	Virgil Yow	17-9			
1958–59	Virgil Yow	15–12			
1959–60	Virgil Yow	16–7			
1960–61	Virgil Yow	14–10			
Virgil Yow (Carolinas Intercollegiate Athletic Conference) (1961–1962)
1961–62	Virgil Yow	14–12			
Virgil Yow:		342–215 (.614)			
Tom Quinn (Carolinas Intercollegiate Athletic Conference) (1962–1966)
1962–63	Tom Quinn	22–7	10–4		
1963–64	Thomas Quinn	25–7	12–2		NAIA Tournament Quarterfinals
1964–65	Tom Quinn	29–4	11–3		NAIA Tournament second round
1965–66	Tom Quinn	19–7	11–3		
Tom Quinn:		95–22 (.812)	44–12 (.786)		
Bob Vaughn (Carolinas Intercollegiate Athletic Conference) (1966–1971)
1966–67	Bob Vaughn	5–18	3–11		
1967–68	Bob Vaughn	15–11	8–6		
1968–69	Bob Vaughn	28–3	13–1	1st	NAIA Tournament Quarterfinals
1969–70	Bob Vaughn	13–17			
1970–71	Bob Vaughn	12–18			
Bob Vaughn:		75–67 (.528)	24–18 (.571)		
J.D. Barnett (Carolinas Intercollegiate Athletic Conference) (1971–1972)
1971–72	J.D. Barnett	13–16			
J.D. Barnett:		13–16 (.448)			
Jerry Steele (Carolinas Intercollegiate Athletic Conference) (1972–1995)
1972–73	Jerry Steele	11–15	6–8		
1973–74	Jerry Steele	8–19	4–10		
1974–75	Jerry Steele	1–15	7–7		
1975–76	Jerry Steele	12–14	6–8		
1976–77	Jerry Steele	13–14	7–7		
1977–78	Jerry Steele	16–14	9–5		NAIA District 26 Playoff Quarterfinals
1978–79	Jerry Steele	27–6	11–3		NAIA Tournament second round
1979–80	Jerry Steele	22–8	12–2		
1980–81	Jerry Steele	16–12	8–6		
1981–82	Jerry Steele	15–10	8–5		
1982–83	Jerry Steele	6–19	3–10		
1983–84	Jerry Steele	15–9	9–6		NAIA District 26 Playoff Quarterfinals
1984–85	Jerry Steele	18–12	9–5		
1985–86	Jerry Steele	11–17	5–9		
1986–87	Jerry Steele	18–11	9–5		NAIA District 26 playoff Finals
1987–88	Jerry Steele	22–6	11–3		NAIA District 26 playoff Finals
1988–89	Jerry Steele	22–6	12–2		
1989–90	Jerry Steele	8–17	3–11		
1990–91	Jerry Steele	12–18	5–9		
1991–92	Jerry Steele	16–14	7–7		
1992–93	Jerry Steele	12–15	3–8		
1993–94	Jerry Steele	21–8	10–4		
1994–95	Jerry Steele	20–9	8–6		
Jerry Steele (Carolinas–Virginia Athletic Conference) (1995–1997)
1995–96	Jerry Steele	24–7	16–2	2nd	NCAA Division II Tournament Regional semifinals
1996–97	Jerry Steele	18–12	11–9	1st	NCAA Division II Tournament Regional semifinals
Jerry Steele (Independent) (1997–1999)
1997–98	Jerry Steele	12–13			
1998–99	Jerry Steele	10–16			
Jerry Steele (Big South Conference) (1999–2003)
1999–00	Jerry Steele	11–17	5–9	6th	
2000–01	Jerry Steele	8–20	3–11	8th	
2001–02	Jerry Steele	11–19	5–9	T-6th	
2002–03	Jerry Steele	7–20	3–11	8th	
Jerry Steele:		493–412 (.545)	404–196 (.673)		
Bart Lundy (Big South Conference) (2003–2009)
2003–04	Bart Lundy	19–11	10–6	T-3rd	
2004–05	Bart Lundy	13–18	7–9	T-4th	
2005–06	Bart Lundy	16–13	8–8	5th	
2006–07	Bart Lundy	22–10	11–3	2nd	
2007–08	Bart Lundy	17–14	8–6	3rd	
2008–09	Bart Lundy	9–21	4–14	T-9th	
Bart Lundy:		96–87 (.525)	48–46 (.511)		
Scott Cherry (Big South Conference) (2009–2018)
2009–10	Scott Cherry	15–15	10–8	T-5th	
2010–11	Scott Cherry	12–19	7–11	T-7th	
2011–12	Scott Cherry	13–18	8–10	T-6th	
2012–13	Scott Cherry	17–14	12–4	1st (North)	CIT first round
2013–14	Scott Cherry	16–15	12–4	1st (North)	NIT first round
2014–15	Scott Cherry	23–10	13–5	T-1st	CIT second round
2015–16	Scott Cherry	21–11	13–5	T-1st	NIT first round
2016–17	Scott Cherry	15–15	9–9	5th	
2017–18	Scott Cherry	14–16	9–9	T-5th	
Scott Cherry:		146–134 (.521)	92–65 (.586)		
Tubby Smith (Big South Conference) (2018–2022)
2018–19	Tubby Smith	16–15	9–7	T-5th	
2019–20	Tubby Smith	9–23	6–12	T-10th	
2020–21	Tubby Smith	8–10	6–7	8th	
Tubby Smith:		41–75 (.353)	21–26 (.447)		
G. G. Smith (Big South Conference) (2022–2023)
2021–22	G. G. Smith	3–3	2–2	T-3rd (North)	
2022–23	G. G. Smith	14–17	6–12	8th	
G. G. Smith:		17–20 (.459)	8–14 (.364)		
Alan Huss (Big South Conference) (2023–2025)
2023–24	Alan Huss	27–9	13–3	1st	CBI Runner–up
2024–25	Alan Huss	29–6	14–2	1st	NCAA Division I Round of 64
Alan Huss:		56–15 (.789)	27–5 (.844)		
Flynn Clayman (Big South Conference) (2025–present)
2025–26	Flynn Clayman	31–5	15–1	1st	NCAA Division I Round of 32
Flynn Clayman:		31–5 (.861)	15–1 (.938)		
Total:		1,464–1,109 (.569)			
National champion Postseason invitational champion Conference regular season champion Conference regular season and conference tournament champion Division regular season champion Division regular season and conference tournament champion Conference tournament champion
