= Statue of Joe Paterno =

Bronze sculpture in Pennsylvania, US

Coordinates: 40°48′47.20″N 77°51′17.56″W

Joe Paterno
- Artist: Angelo Di Maria
- Year: 2001
- Type: Bronze sculpture
- Dimensions: 2.1 m (7 ft)
- Location: State College, Pennsylvania, U.S.

Joe Paterno is a bronze sculpture of Joe Paterno, former head coach of the Penn State Nittany Lions football team. It was located on the northeast side of Beaver Stadium on the campus of the Pennsylvania State University in State College, Pennsylvania, United States, until it was removed in 2012 in the aftermath of the Penn State child sex abuse scandal.

== Background and description ==
The statue was commissioned to Angelo DiMaria, a sculptor from Reading, Pennsylvania, by friends of Paterno and his wife Sue in recognition of his contributions to the university and was unveiled on November 2, 2001. It was sculpted by Colombian-American artist Yesid Gomez and Wilfer Buitrago from Ephrata, Pennsylvania and took 6 months to complete.

The statue is 7 feet (2.1 m) high and weighs 900 pounds (410 kg). It was accompanied by a stone wall in three sections. The left section of the wall read, "Joseph Vincent Paterno: Educator, Coach, Humanitarian". The center section showed a bas-relief sculpture of players running behind Paterno. On the right was a quote from Paterno, "They ask me what I'd like written about me when I'm gone. I hope they write I made Penn State a better place, not just that I was a good football coach." The right section also featured plaques with lists of games Paterno had coached at Penn State from 1966 to 2011.

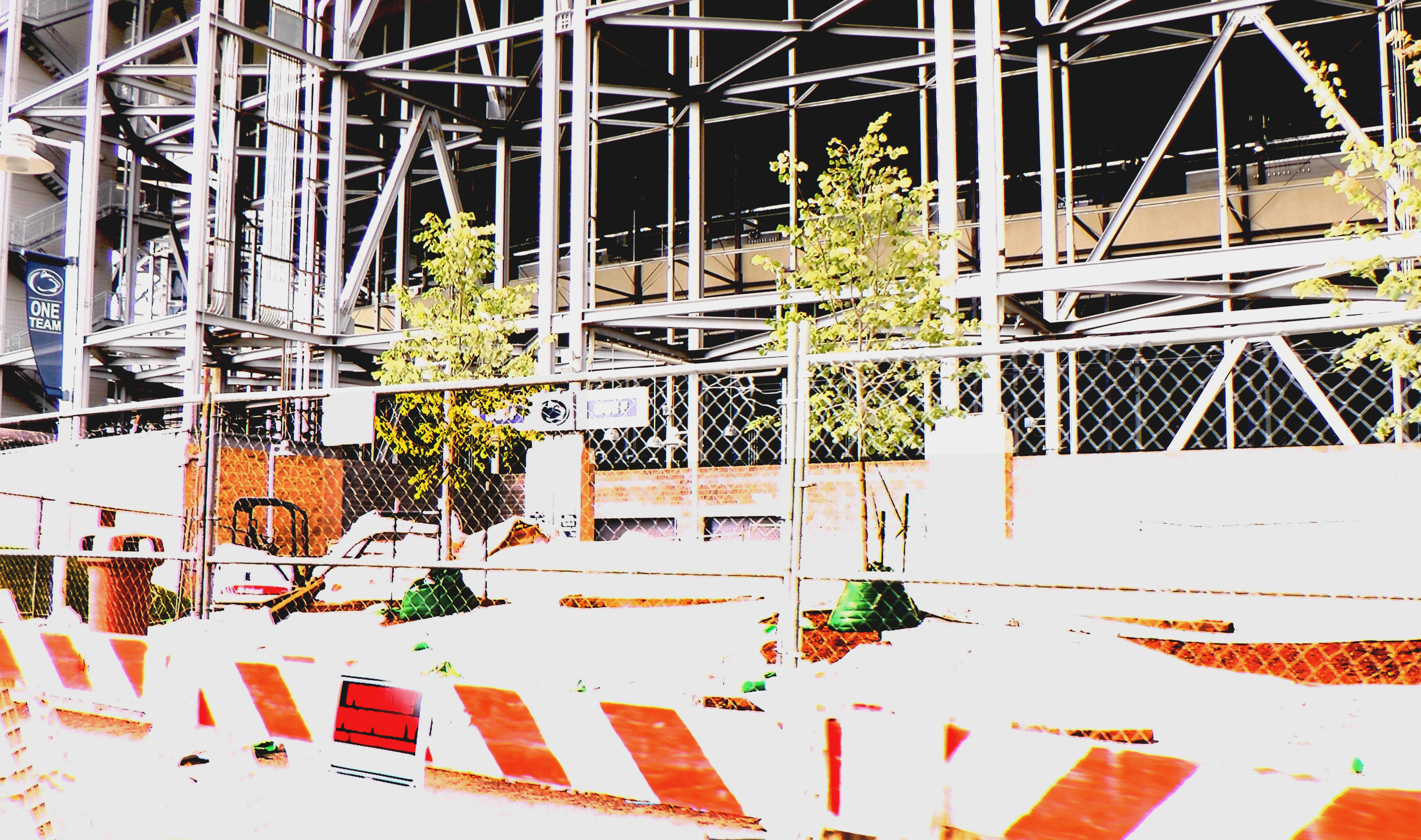
By July 27, 2012, the statue's backdrop had been demolished and was being replaced by trees and landscaping.

== Removal ==
Following the 2011 Penn State child sex abuse scandal, there were widespread calls for the statue to be removed, including by Paterno's friend and longtime Florida State coach Bobby Bowden. At one point, an anonymous individual chartered a plane to fly over State College for several hours with a banner that read "Take the Statue Down or We Will".

On July 22, 2012, six months after Paterno's death, the university announced it had removed the statue and "store[d] it in a secure location", citing that it had become a "source of division and an obstacle to healing". The accompanying plaques, bas-relief, and quotations were removed as well. According to Penn State President Rodney Erickson, "were it to remain, the statue will be a recurring wound to the multitude of individuals across the nation and beyond who have been the victims of child abuse".

== See also ==
- Statue of Calvin Griffith
- Statue of Jerry Richardson
