= List of Wofford Terriers in the NFL draft =

This is a list of Wofford Terriers football players in the NFL draft.

== Key ==
B	Back	K	Kicker	NT	Nose tackle
C	Center	LB	Linebacker	FB	Fullback
DB	Defensive back	P	Punter	HB	Halfback
DE	Defensive end	QB	Quarterback	WR	Wide receiver
DT	Defensive tackle	RB	Running back	G	Guard
E	End	T	Offensive tackle	TE	Tight end

= Pro Bowler
= Hall of Famer

== Selections ==
Year	Round	Pick	Player	Team	Position
1951	25	295	Vernon Quick	Chicago Cardinals	G
1957	15	165	George Rice	Washington Redskins	T
1958	13	154	Jerry Richardson	Baltimore Colts	E
