= Statue of Jerry Richardson =

Statue removed during George Floyd protests

- Interactive map of Statue of Jerry Richardson
- Location: Charlotte, North Carolina, U.S.
- Coordinates: 35°13′36″N 80°51′06″W
- Designer: Todd Andrews
- Height: 3.96 metres (13.0 ft)
- Dedicated date: 2016
- Dedicated to: Jerry Richardson
- Dismantled date: June 2020

A statue of Jerry Richardson, the founder of the National Football League’s Carolina Panthers, was installed outside their stadium in Charlotte, North Carolina, United States, in 2016. In the years following its installation, a controversy was brought to light involving Richardson allegedly committing sexist behavior prior to selling the team. As a result, the statue was removed from Bank of America Stadium in June 2020 for fear it would be destroyed by protestors.

== Background ==
The statue was a gift to Richardson, the founding owner of the Carolina Panthers, during his 80th birthday, given by the team's minority ownership partners. It stood 13 feet tall outside the north entrance of Bank of America Stadium, depicting Richardson in a suit holding a football and flanked by two life-sized black panthers with green eyes.

When the U.S. national anthem protests started back in 2016 in response to police brutality, it was reported by numerous Panthers players such as Tre Boston that Richardson prohibited his players from joining the protests. After Richardson was forced to sell the team after the 2017 season following racist and sexist remarks made to team employees in light of the Me Too movement, David Tepper, the new owner, was forced to keep the statue up as a "contractual obligation" of purchasing the Panthers, much to the chagrin of many fans. However, it was taken down and stored in a hidden place by Panthers management in 2020 in light of the George Floyd protests.

The Panthers organization has not explained how it will dispose of the statue, but it has been reported that the organization does not intend to restore it. Richardson himself also reportedly "moved on" before his death and said that the statue "is not his focus", according to his spokesperson. Boston later commented that the removal of the statue was "best for the community".

== See also ==
- List of monuments and memorials removed during the George Floyd protests
  - Statue of Calvin Griffith
- Statue of Joe Paterno, another sports-related sculpture removed amid controversy regarding the subject
