= 1957 Little All-America college football team =

American college football all-star team

The 1957 Little All-America college football team is composed of college football players from small colleges and universities who were selected by the Associated Press (AP) as the best players at each position. For 1957, the AP selected three teams of 11 players each, with no separate defensive platoons.

The AP reiterated in 1957 the purpose of the Little All-America team to honor players "who competed for smaller colleges outside the glare of the headlines."

Norm Jarock of St. Norbert led all small college players in total offense with 1,306 rushing yards and 252 passing yards.

Leonard Lyles of Louisville was the leading scorer in college football with 132 points.

Dan Nolan of Lehigh tallied 856 passing yards and 248 rushing yards in a nine-game schedule.

== First team ==
Position	Player	Team
B	Dan Nolan	Lehigh
B	Charles Bradshaw	Wofford
B	Leonard Lyles	Louisville
B	Norman Jarock	St. Norbert
E	Howard Clark	Chattanooga
E	Peter Kasson	Ripon
T	Bruce Hartman	Luther
T	Dudley Meredith	Lamar Tech
G	Howard Morris	Linfield
G	Dave Young	Randolph–Macon
C	Dick Huston	Eastern Washington

== Second team ==
Position	Player	Team
B	Tony Toto	Delaware
B	Dick Camp	Wheaton (IL)
B	Les Plumb	Springfield (MA)
B	George Sullivan	Whitman
E	Tom Taylor	Albion
E	Jerry Hurst	Middle Tennessee
T	Dave Triplett	Hillsdale
T	George Kurker	Tufts
G	Charles Davis	McMurry
G	James Hardin	Bowling Green
C	Jerry Jurizik	St. Benedict's (KS)

== Third team ==
Position	Player	Team
B	Terry Stevens	Upper Iowa
B	Dale Thibault	Westminster (UT)
B	James Hirth	Abilene Christian
B	Frank Capitani	Gettysburg
E	Jerry Richardson	Wofford
E	Clint Westemeyer	St. Ambrose
T	Pete Williams	Lehigh
T	Floyd Peters	San Francisco State
G	Lou Mooradian	Connecticut
G	Frank Farella	Arkansas State
C	Al Vadnais	Hofstra

== See also ==
- 1957 College Football All-America Team
