= Chowan Hawks =

- University: Chowan University
- Nickname: Hawks
- NCAA: Division II
- Conference: Conference Carolinas (primary); CIAA (women's bowling)
- Athletic director: Rob Burke
- Location: Murfreesboro, North Carolina
- Varsity teams: 20 (10 men's, 9 women's, 1 co-ed)
- Football stadium: Garrison Stadium
- Basketball arena: Hawks Athletic Center (Bob Burke Court)
- Baseball stadium: Hawkins Field
- Softball stadium: CU Softball Field
- Soccer stadium: Soccer/Lacrosse Complex
- Aquatics center: Bynum Brown Aquatic Center
- Tennis venue: Rose Family Tennis Complex
- Colors: Royal blue and white
- Mascot: Murf
- Website: gocuhawks.com
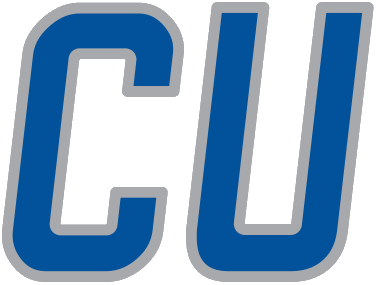

The Chowan Hawks are the athletic teams that represent Chowan University, located in Murfreesboro, North Carolina, in NCAA Division II intercollegiate sports.

The Hawks compete as members of the Conference Carolinas for 19 of the 21 sports with women's bowling as an associate member of the Central Intercollegiate Athletic Association (CIAA). Chowan will begin competition in Acrobatics and Tumbling and Esports in 2020–2021. The Acrobatics and Tumbling program is sanctioned by the National Collegiate Acrobatics and Tumbling Association (NCATA), while Esports is sanctioned through National Association of Collegiate Esports (NACE).

Chowan has been a full member of Conference Carolinas as a full member since the 2019–20 season, and was formerly also a member of the National Christian College Athletic Association and the USA South Athletic Conference of the NCAA's Division III, and the CIAA from 2009–10 to 2018–19.

== History ==
On September 24, 2007, the Central Intercollegiate Athletic Association (CIAA), established in 1912 and the oldest black athletic conference in United States, announced that Chowan would join the conference for its 2008 football season. Chowan initially entered the CIAA as a football-only member, continuing its membership at the NCAA Division II-level. In joining the CIAA (which sponsors 16 men’s and women’s championships annually). In October 2008, the CIAA's board of trustees voted to accept Chowan as a full member. Chowan then became the first non-HBCU member of the CIAA, participating in all sports beginning with the 2009–2010 academic year.

== Conference affiliations ==
NCAA

- USA South Athletic Conference (2000–2004)
- Independent (2004–2009)
- Central Intercollegiate Athletic Association (2009–2019)
- Conference Carolinas (2019–present)

== Varsity teams ==
=== List of teams ===
Men's sports (9)

- Baseball
- Basketball
- Cross country
- Football
- Golf
- Lacrosse
- Soccer
- Swimming
- Tennis

Women's sports (11)

- Acrobatics and Tumbling
- Basketball
- Bowling
- Cross country
- Golf
- Lacrosse
- Soccer
- Softball
- Swimming
- Tennis
- Volleyball

Co-Ed sports (2)

- Cheerleading
- Esports

== Individual teams ==
=== Football ===
Coach Jim Garrison was inducted into the North Carolina Sports Hall of Fame in 2001. He was the Chowan College football coach for 43 years. Coach Garrison won 182 games (third among junior college coaches) and was 7-time Conference Coach of the Year. 35 players were NJCAA All-Americans. The last football team to post a winning record was the 1999 Chowan team, which finished 5–4.

=== Men's basketball ===
Bob Burke, "All-time winningest coach in Chowan's basketball history," with a 337–124 overall record.
