= Cal Irvin =

American baseball player and basketball coach (1924–2017)

- Shortstop
- Born: November 28, 1924; Haleburg, Alabama, U.S.
- Died: November 25, 2017 (aged 92); Greensboro, North Carolina, U.S.
- Threw: Right

Negro league baseball debut
- 1946, for the Newark Eagles

Last appearance
- 1947, for the New York Black Yankees
- Stats at Baseball Reference

Teams
- Newark Eagles (1946); New York Black Yankees (1947)

Calvin Coolidge Irvin (November 28, 1924 – November 25, 2017) was an American Negro league baseball shortstop and college basketball coach.

A native of Haleburg, Alabama, Irvin was the brother of Baseball Hall of Famer Monte Irvin. Younger brother Cal attended Orange High School and Morgan State University, where he played basketball and football. He played for the Newark Eagles during their 1946 Negro World Series championship season, and played with the New York Black Yankees in 1947.

Irvin went on to become the athletic director and head basketball coach at North Carolina A&T State University, coaching there for 18 years, and winning four Central Intercollegiate Athletic Association titles. A member of the North Carolina Sports Hall of Fame, Irvin died in Greensboro, North Carolina in 2017 at age 92.
