= Herb Appenzeller =

American football player, coach, and administrator (1925–2018)

Biographical details
- Born: September 28, 1925
- Died: January 5, 2018; Greensboro, North Carolina, U.S.

Playing career

Football
- 1944–1947: Wake Forest

Coaching career (HC unless noted)

Football
- 1948: Rolesville HS (NC)
- 1949–1950: Wakelon HS (NC)
- 1951–1955: Chowan
- 1956–1962: Guilford

Basketball
- 1948–1949: Rolesville HS (NC)

Administrative career (AD unless noted)
- 1956–1987: Guilford

Head coaching record
- Overall: 10–50–1 (college football)

Herbert Thomas Appenzeller (September 28, 1925 – January 5, 2018) was an American football coach and college athletics administrator. He served as the head football coach at Guilford College in Greensboro, North Carolina from 1956 to 1962, compiling a record of 10–50–1. A native of Newark, New Jersey, Appenzeller played college football and ran track at Wake Forest University. He was the head football coach at Chowan College—now known as Chowan University—in Murfreesboro, North Carolina from 1951 to 1955, when the school was a junior college.

== Head coaching record ==
=== College ===
Year	Team	Overall	Conference	Standing	Bowl/playoffs
Guilford Quakers (North State Conference / Carolinas Conference) (1956–1962)
1956	Guilford	1–7	0–4	6th	
1957	Guilford	1–6–1	1–3–1	6th	
1958	Guilford	3–6	1–5	7th	
1956	Guilford	2–7	1–5	6th	
1960	Guilford	1–8	0–6	7th	
1961	Guilford	0–9	0–7	8th	
1962	Guilford	2–7	1–5	7th	
Guilford:		10–50–1	4–35–1		
Total:		10–50–1			
