= Bank of America Stadium =

Stadium in Charlotte, North Carolina

- The Bank, BofA, BoA, The Fortress

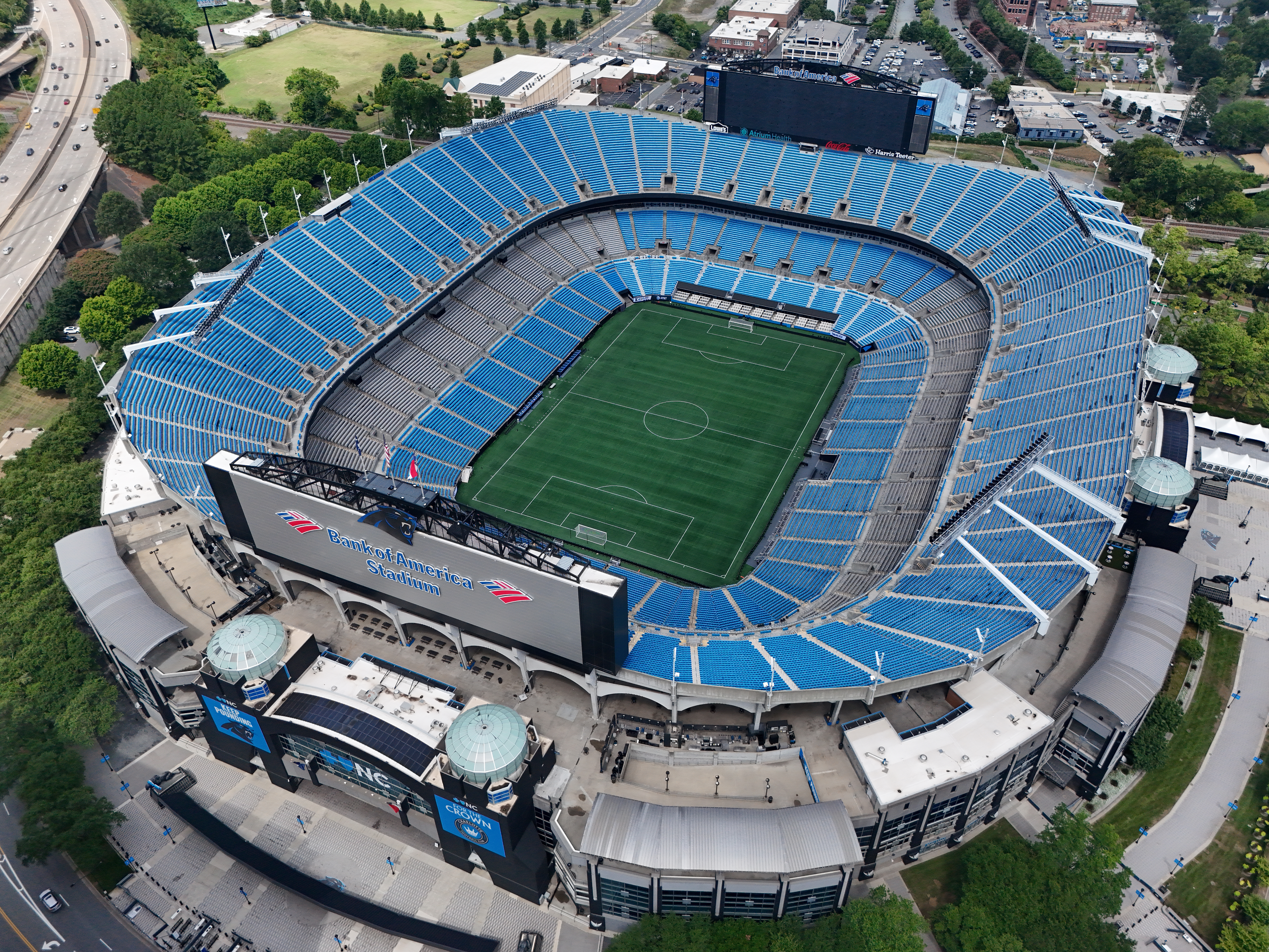
- Bank of America Stadium in 2025

- Location in North Carolina Location in the United States
- Former names: Panthers Stadium (planning); Carolinas Stadium (planning); Ericsson Stadium (1996–2004)
- Address: 800 South Mint Street
- Location: Charlotte, North Carolina, U.S.
- Coordinates: 35°13′33″N 80°51′10″W
- Owner: Tepper Sports and Entertainment
- Operator: Tepper Sports and Entertainment
- Capacity: 75,037 (2025–present) Former capacity: List: 75,523 (2017–2020); 75,419 (2015–2016); 74,455 (2014); 73,778 (2008–2013); 73,504 (2007); 73,298 (2005–2006); 73,250 (1998–2004); 73,248 (1997); 72,685 (1996)
- Executive suites: 151
- Surface: FieldTurf Vertex CORE
- Scoreboard: 55.5 ft tall by 198.3 ft wide (x2)
- Record attendance: 82,193 (October 26, 2024; Concert for Carolina)
- Field size: 398 feet long x 280 feet wide
- Public transit: Brooklyn Village

Construction
- Groundbreaking: April 22, 1994
- Opened: August 3, 1996
- Renovated: 2007, 2014–2017, 2019, 2020–21
- Expanded: 1997–1998, 2005, 2007–2008, 2014–2015, 2017
- Cost: $500 million
- Architects: Wagner Murray Architects; Populous (then HOK Sport)
- Structural engineers: Bliss and Nyitray, Inc.
- Services engineer: Lockwood Greene
- General contractors: Turner; F.N. Thompson

Tenants
- Carolina Panthers (NFL) (1996–present); Charlotte FC (MLS) (2022–present); Duke's Mayo Bowl (NCAA) (2002–present); Duke's Mayo Classic (NCAA) (2015–present)

Website
- bankofamericastadium.com

Bank of America Stadium is a multi-purpose stadium located in the Uptown section of Charlotte, North Carolina, United States. It has a capacity of 75,037 and is the home facility and headquarters of the Carolina Panthers of the National Football League (NFL) and Charlotte FC of Major League Soccer (MLS). The stadium opened in 1996 as Ericsson Stadium, with Swedish telecom company LM Ericsson initially holding the naming rights. In 2004, Charlotte-based financial services company Bank of America purchased the naming rights under a 20-25-year agreement at $140 million. Former Panthers president Danny Morrison called it a "classic American stadium" due to its bowl design and other features.

In addition to the Panthers and CLTFC, the stadium hosts the annual Duke's Mayo Bowl, which features teams from the Atlantic Coast Conference (ACC) and either the Southeastern Conference (SEC) or the Big Ten Conference. The stadium was planned to host the annual ACC Championship Game through at least 2019; the game was moved in 2016 but reinstated in 2017. The ACC announced on May 19, 2022, that Bank of America Stadium would continue to host the championship through at least the 2030 season. The largest crowd to ever attend a football game at the stadium was on September 9, 2018, when 74,532 people watched the Panthers defeat the Dallas Cowboys 16–8.

== Sites considered for selection ==
The Panthers organization considered several possible sites for the stadium's location before choosing the Charlotte center city site. Part of the site was occupied by the historic Good Samaritan Hospital. As part of the preparation for the 2019 Equal Justice Initiative Community Remembrance Project, Charlotte historian Michael Moore determined the site was also significant as the location of the city's first known lynching in 1913.

One alternative was near NASCAR's Charlotte Motor Speedway and the University of North Carolina at Charlotte in northeast Mecklenburg County. Another was at the intersection of I-85 and US 74 in western Gaston County. A popular option was to locate the facility near Carowinds amusement park, with the 50 yard line being on the state border of North Carolina and South Carolina.

== Naming rights ==
The stadium was originally known as Carolinas Stadium, a name which remains in use for certain events such as FIFA matches. It opened on August 3, 1996, as Ericsson Stadium after Swedish telecom company LM Ericsson purchased the naming rights in a ten-year, $25 million agreement. In 2004, the stadium received its current name after Bank of America purchased the naming rights for 20 years. Since then, many fans now refer to the stadium as "BOA", or "The Bank."

== Stadium features ==
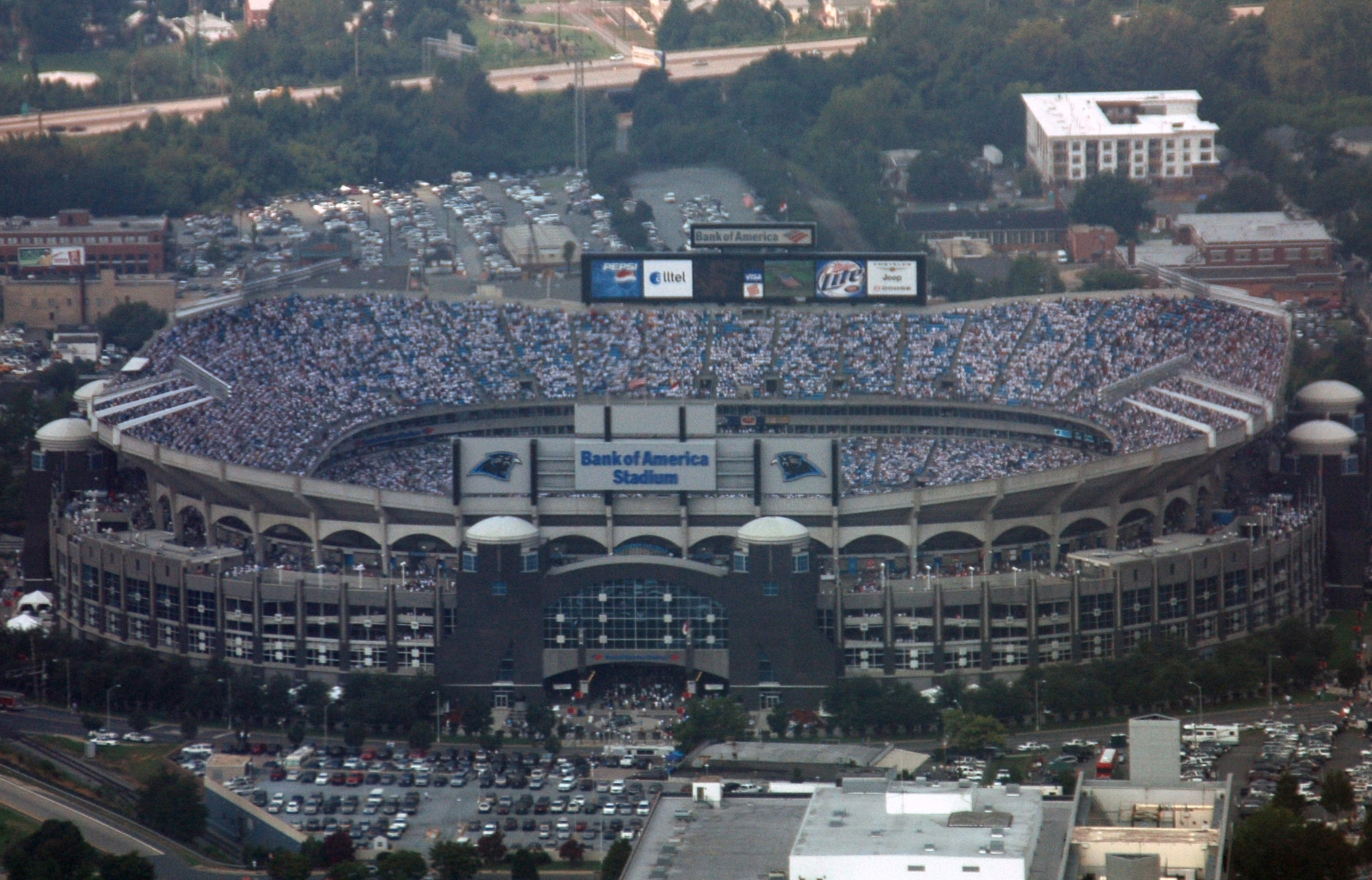
The exterior

Bank of America Stadium has many unique external features. Aspects of the stadium's architecture, such as the three huge main entrances, incorporate the team's colors of black, process blue and silver. Arches that connect column supports on the upper deck resemble the shape of half a football, while several acres of numerous trees and landscaping surround the building. The stadium's architecture and design has been compared to that of the Los Angeles Memorial Coliseum and Soldier Field, among others. It has also received mentions for externally resembling "a fortress" instead of a stadium.

Each of the stadium's entrances are flanked on both sides by two larger-than-life bronze panther statues, something unique throughout the entire NFL. These six statues are all named "Indomitable Spirit" and were installed in 1996. Each one depicts a crouching, snarling panther with green eyes; they are the largest sculptures ever commissioned in the United States. The names of the team's original PSL owners are engraved into each statue's base.

The stadium also has six light domes. These are found on top of the main entrances, two per entrance, and sit over a hundred feet in the air. Originally, they simply glowed the Panthers' unique 'process blue' every night. As the seasons wore on, the emitted light became less and less impressive and the domes started showing their age. During the 2014 renovations, the domes were rebuilt with LED systems which allow them to project process blue in various ways not possible with the original technology.

Additionally, two people in the Panthers Hall of Honor, former team executive Mike McCormack and former Panthers linebacker and assistant coach Sam Mills, are honored with life-sized bronze statues outside the stadium. Before the 2014 renovations, the names of the hall of honor inductees were placed where the upper ribbon board now resides. These names were subsequently repainted onto the top rear wall behind the last row of seats, then replaced by signs in 2019. Three marble copies of a quote about the stadium from team founder Jerry Richardson were placed near the stadium's entrances in 2014. Due to renovations, these quotes were later displayed in the lower concourse entrances. They are also engraved on benches outside the stadium.

In 2016, a statue of Richardson was added in front of the stadium's north gate in celebration of his 80th birthday. The statue stands nearly 13 ft (3.96 m) tall and features larger than life sculptures of Richardson flanked on both sides by two panthers. One panther stands on its hind legs, claws bared, while the other crouches. All three sculptures have the same bronze color and both panthers have the green eyes of and physically resemble the "Indomitable Spirit" statues. In June 2020, the statue was removed, with the team citing potential safety concerns due to protests going on at the time.

== Carolina Panthers ==
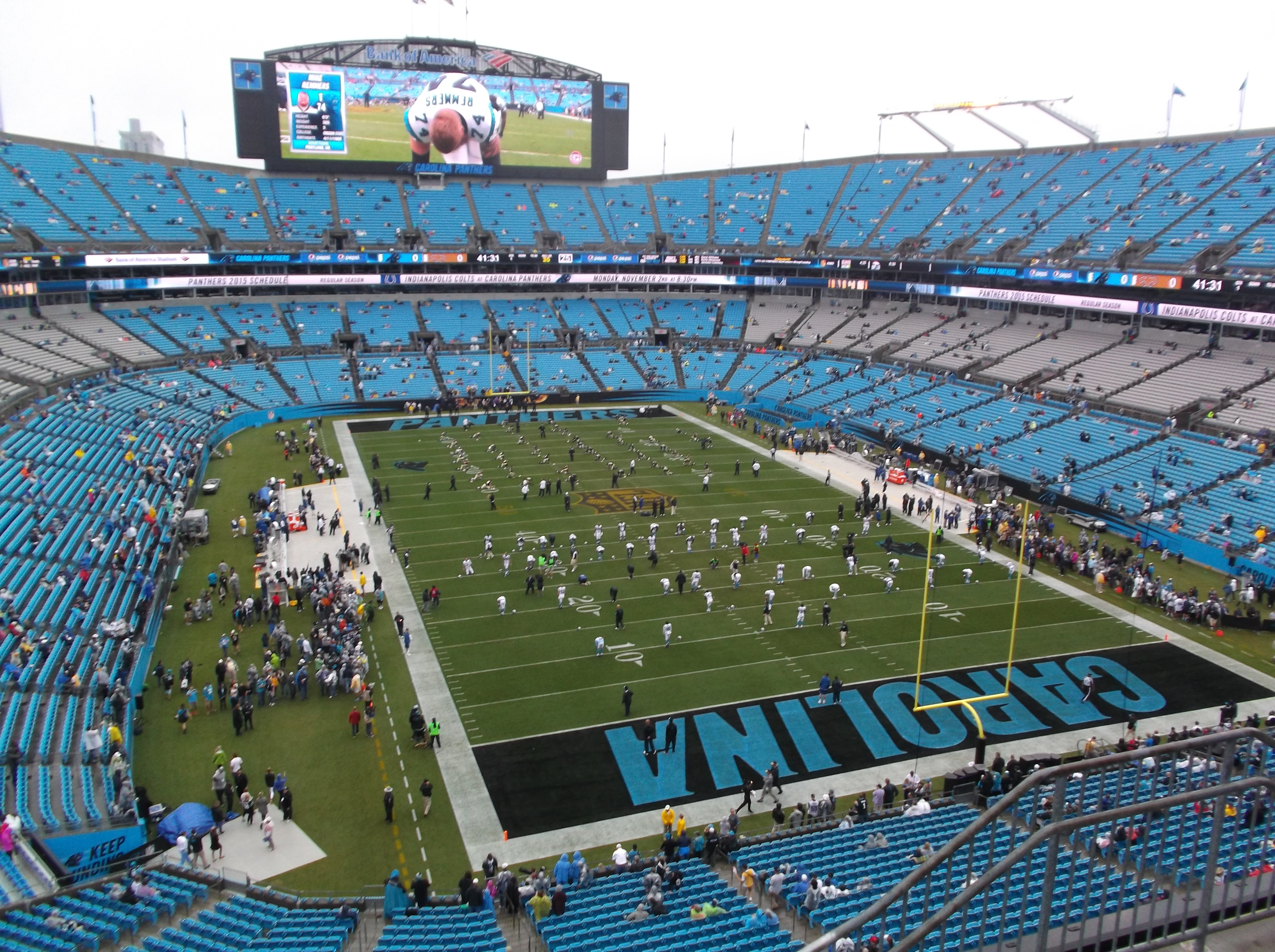
The stadium in 2015

In addition to hosting every Panthers home game since 1996, Bank of America Stadium has hosted seven playoff games. Carolina has also had over 150 consecutive sellouts at the stadium starting with the 2002 season.

=== Inaugural season ===
The Panthers played their inaugural season at Clemson University's Memorial Stadium while the stadium was being constructed. On August 3, 1996, the stadium played host to its first professional football game as the Panthers took on the Chicago Bears during the preseason. The inaugural kickoff was at 7:35 pm. Carolina won 30–12. The stadium's first regular season game took place on September 1, 1996, against Carolina's to-be division rival Atlanta; the Panthers won 29–6.

=== Playoff games ===
In 1996, on their way to their first NFC Championship Game, Carolina defeated the then-defending Super Bowl Champion Dallas Cowboys in the first playoff game the stadium hosted. Again they defeated the Cowboys on their way to Super Bowl XXXVIII in Houston in 2004. Carolina was handed their first ever home playoff loss, 33–13, by the Arizona Cardinals on January 10, 2009, in the divisional round. The Panthers suffered a second home playoff loss against the San Francisco 49ers 23–10 on January 12, 2014, in the same round. En route to their fourth NFC Championship game appearance, the Panthers beat the Seattle Seahawks 31–24 in the divisional round on January 17, 2016. The Panthers defeated the Arizona Cardinals 49–15 in the NFC Championship game for their second NFC Championship in franchise history on January 24, 2016. This marked the first NFC Championship played and won at the stadium.

=== Notable weather events ===
Since it is an open-air stadium, Bank of America Stadium has been subject to a number of events caused by extreme weather.

- In 2011, a rainstorm blanketed the stadium towards the end of the second quarter and caused severe flooding. Four-plus inches of rain fell in under an hour. Charlotte Magazine later termed the game as the '11 Water Bowl. Carolina won 16–10.
- On December 24, 2022, the temperature was 20 °F (−7 °C) at kickoff, making it the coldest home game in Panthers history.
- On June 28, 2025, a FIFA Club World Cup round of 16 match between Benfica and Chelsea was suspended at the 86th minute after the referee called the players and staff into the tunnel, while storms were approaching Charlotte. The game resumed after around 2 hours, and Chelsea went on to win 4-1 after extra time.

== Impact on NFL venues ==
At the time of its construction in the mid-1990s, the stadium was a pioneering project for the use of Personal Seat Licenses. It was the first large-scale project funded in the United States chiefly through securing PSLs, which were a new idea themselves. The strength of PSL pledges impressed NFL owners and helped result in the Carolinas receiving the first NFL expansion team in nearly two decades.

The Seattle Seahawks used the stadium, among others, as a reference when designing CenturyLink Field. By 2013, the number of new or renovated stadiums since Bank of America Stadium opened had risen to 25.

== Stadium renovations ==
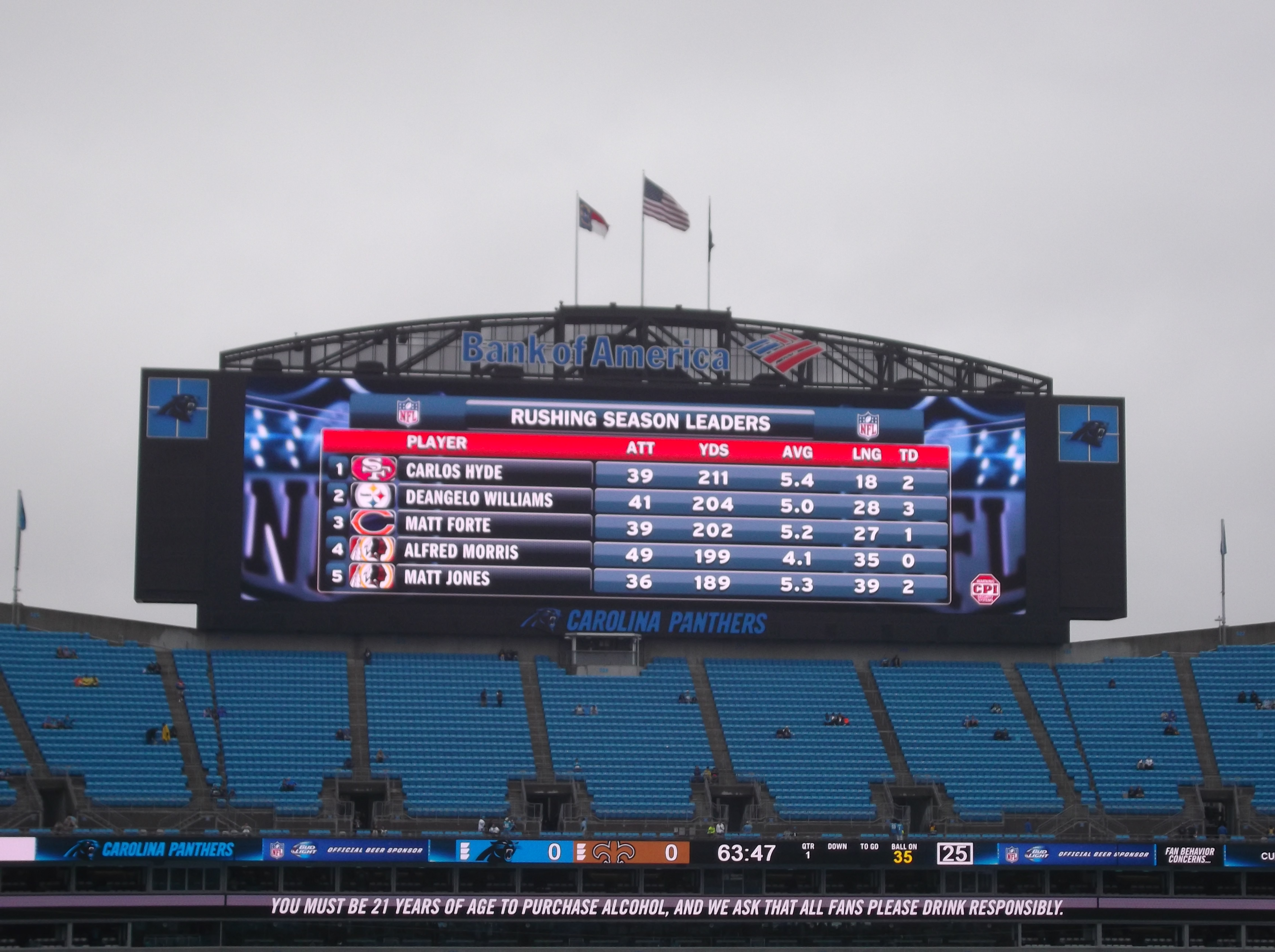
One of the video boards installed in 2014

During its first few seasons the stadium was considered so far ahead of its time that until the 2013–14 offseason it only underwent minor improvements (aside from seating additions). The most notable of these improvements came in 2007 when the original scoreboards, video boards and displays from 1996 were replaced with 31.5' x 77' Diamond Vision video boards. Four ribbon boards were also installed: two spanning the length of the field on either side and two in opposing corners.

In the following years the stadium still wasn't considered as up-to-date as other NFL stadiums. Several reasons existed, including the lack of a surround sound system, smaller video boards compared to the rest of the league and poor cellular reception, among others. During the 2013 offseason, the Panthers renovated the home locker room. It now contained 74 lockers compared to 66 previously, the interior became more clean and modern, and the team's then-new logo was added throughout.

The Panthers proposed a $250 million stadium renovation project in early 2013, pending a vote by the city of Charlotte to help pay for it. This plan included two sets of new scoreboards, multiple escalators, infrastructure and concourse improvements, among others. The subsequent vote by the city failed and efforts to get any money from the State of North Carolina failed as well. However, in April 2013 the Charlotte city council agreed to an $87.5 million deal for the renovations. This deal also kept the Panthers in Charlotte until at least 2019. Despite the lower cost, the renovations would stay true to the team's original plans.

=== 2014–2017 renovation ===
==== 2014 ====
In January 2014, the Panthers began the most significant renovations to the stadium in its 18-year history as part one of a multi-year renovation plan. The upgrades, completed by the start of the 2014–2015 NFL season, included numerous enhancements. First and perhaps most striking of all, two 200' x 56' HD video boards (over twice the size of their predecessors), and two 360° ribbon boards from Daktronics replaced the previous scoreboards/ribbon boards. The new ribbon boards were the tallest in the NFL and the video boards were among the top ten largest in the NFL when installed. Secondly, escalators were installed for the upper deck, making access easier for fans. These warranted extensions to the building itself which retained the stadium's original external designs. A new surround sound system was also included, with speakers placed around the perimeter of the bowl doubling as flagpoles. In addition, four covered open-air sections on the upper deck called "fan plazas" were added. Finally, LED-enhanced glass domes were installed along with new external signage above the main entrances.

==== 2015 ====
Prior to the start of the 2015 season, the Panthers renovated all 158 existing luxury suites to the stadium and added a new private club suite, dubbed "The 32 Club" due to its position at the 32-yard line. The team later announced another new club, dubbed the "51 Club" in honor of former player and coach Sam Mills, would also be added. These new installations decreased the stadium's number of luxury suites to 153, but increased overall seating capacity. The team also added two small ribbon boards above each tunnel entrance which are visible from the stands.

==== 2016 ====
Part three of the renovations included upgrading the upper-level concourse with buffet-style drink stations and installing double the amount of wi-fi access points than before. Updated signage reflecting the team's current logos and word mark was added to the upper concourse, as well as improved concession stands and new drink concessions. Most notably, almost 100 full-body scanners replaced the traditional "pat-downs" at the main entrances and a new security office was added, as well as other security improvements.

In addition, a 13-foot statue of Jerry Richardson flanked by two life-sized panthers was erected in front of the stadium as a gift to then-team owner Jerry Richardson. Since June 2020, the statue has since been removed and stored in an undisclosed location in light of the George Floyd protests.

==== 2017 ====
The fourth and final major renovation included updating the lower-level concourse by adding new signage, refurbishing concessions and installing updated televisions in the club levels. Banners depicting significant moments throughout Panthers history were also added to the concourse. The seating capacity was slightly increased thanks to upgrades at the club level. A new field and drainage system were additionally installed.

=== Other renovations ===
In 2019, Lowe's signage was added onto the stadium's East Gate, as well as two Panthers posters. The scoreboards received a minor change with the Panthers signage on the bottom of each board replaced with various sponsor logos. The members in the Panthers' Hall of Honor were also given new nameplates on the rear wall of the upper deck. The next year, 2020, the team announced the removal of almost 1000 seats in the west end zone. This was to replace the seats with 14 "bunker suites" at field level. Construction was finished by the start of the 2020 season.

==== MLS renovation ====
When Charlotte was awarded the 30th Major League Soccer franchise, Charlotte FC, in 2019, it was announced the team would play at Bank of America Stadium. Despite the stadium having the proper field size for soccer, the stadium was not originally designed to accommodate a soccer team full-time. Renovations include new locker rooms, camera positions, a tunnel entrance, an over 200-foot curved video screen outside of the east gate, and lower concourse upgrades. The renovations were completed before Charlotte FC's first season in 2022. In March 2021, it was announced the stadium would have a FieldTurf surface starting with the 2021 NFL season, replacing Bermuda grass that was used since the stadium's inception.

== College and high school football ==
=== College football ===
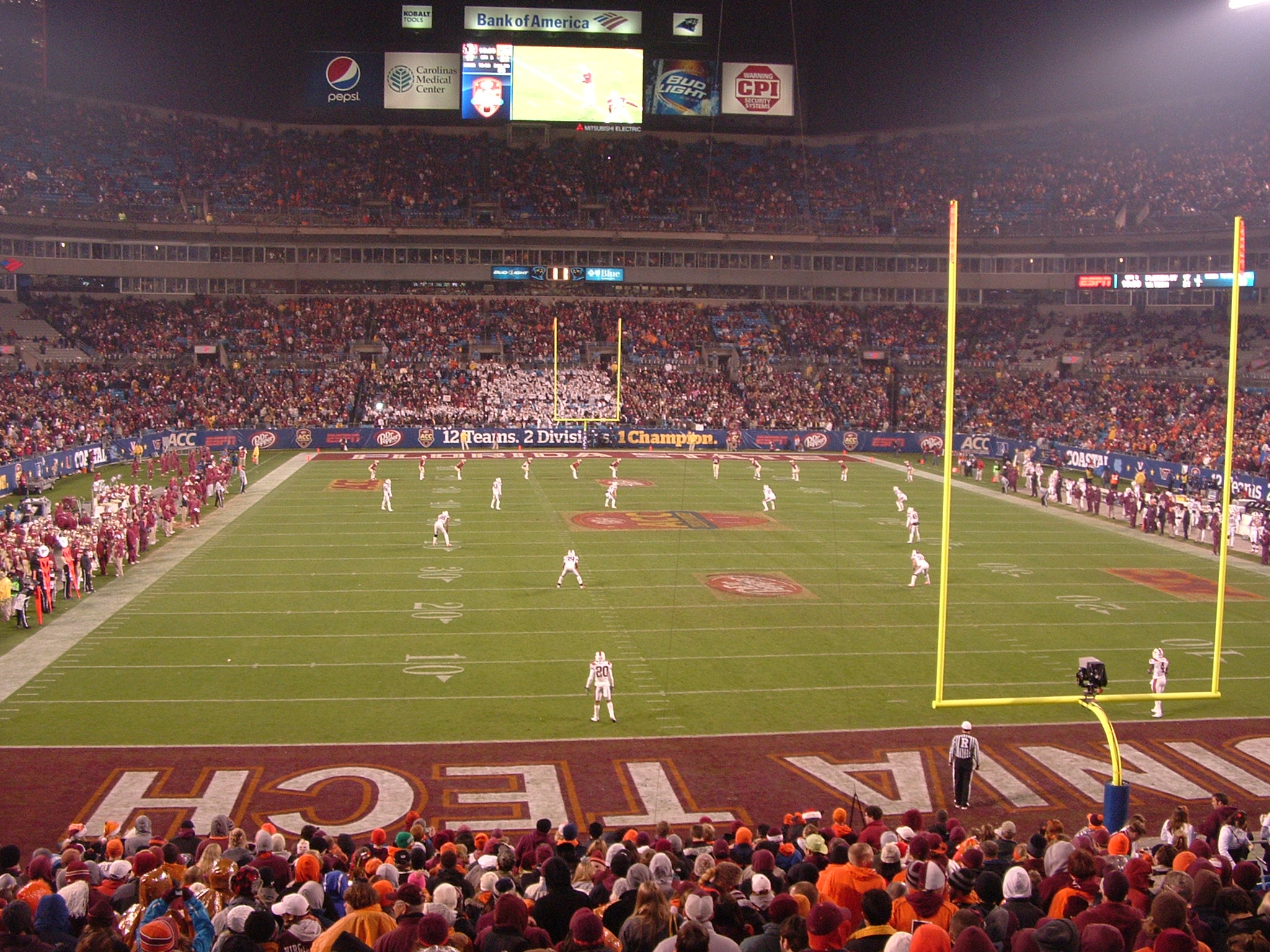
Kickoff to start the second half of the 2010 ACC Championship Game

Bank of America Stadium does not serve as the primary home stadium for any college football team. However, starting in 1996, the stadium has hosted many college football games. These include games featuring teams from across North and South Carolina.

- The ACC Championship Game, played on the first Saturday in December, pits the top two ACC teams (based on regular season records) against each other. Prior to 2024, the ACC Championship Game was played between the winner of the ACC's Coastal Division and winner of the Atlantic Division; it had been held at the stadium from 2010 to 2015. In February 2014, the ACC announced a 6-year contract extension to keep the game in Charlotte through 2019, but pulled out in September 2016 after North Carolina passed the Public Facilities Privacy & Security Act (HB2). The game was reinstated after HB2's repeal in 2017.
- The Duke's Mayo Bowl (previously known as the Continental Tire Bowl, Meineke Car Care Bowl, and Belk Bowl), takes place in late December; it has been held annually in Charlotte since 2002. The game pits teams from the Atlantic Coast Conference (ACC) against either the Southeastern Conference (SEC) or the Big Ten Conference.
- The Duke's Mayo Classic (formerly the Belk Kickoff Game), has been held at the stadium since 2015. The first meeting was between North Carolina and South Carolina. In 2017, the Kickoff game featured NC State and South Carolina; in 2018 the game was played between West Virginia and Tennessee. In 2019, North and South Carolina played each other for the second time. The 2021 matchups were between East Carolina and Appalachian State, with the Mountaineers designated as the home team; and Clemson versus Georgia.
- The stadium has hosted several East Carolina Pirates games: in 1996, a 50–29 win versus the NC State Wolfpack, a 30–23 win in 1999 versus the West Virginia Mountaineers, a 52–14 loss in 2004 to NC State, a 27–22 upset win in 2008 over the 17th-ranked Virginia Tech Hokies, and a 56–37 loss in 2011 to 12th-ranked South Carolina.
- In October 2006, Clemson beat Temple 63–9 in a non-conference game at the stadium. The match-up was a Temple home game, but the school moved it to Charlotte for financial reasons.
- Two games in the North Carolina-NC State football rivalry took place at the stadium in 1998 and 1999. North Carolina won both by the scores of 37–34 and 10–6, respectively.

=== High school football ===
On May 6, 2020, it was announced that Charlotte's Myers Park High School would play against South Pointe High School from Rock Hill, South Carolina. The game was scheduled to take place on September 5, 2020; however, it was later cancelled.

The first high school game played at the stadium happened on August 19, 2023, when NC Powerhouse Providence Day School beat SC Powerhouse Northwestern High School 42–35, in the inaugural Keep Pounding High School Classic. The Keep Pounding Classic has since become an annual event, featuring top teams from both North and South Carolina in the early weeks of the high school season.

== Soccer ==
When Bank of America Stadium was designed, the field was made to meet the requirements for a soccer pitch. This ability would not be used for much of the stadium's first two decades in operation. With Charlotte FC's arrival, the stadium now plays regular host to MLS and international soccer matches.

=== Charlotte FC ===
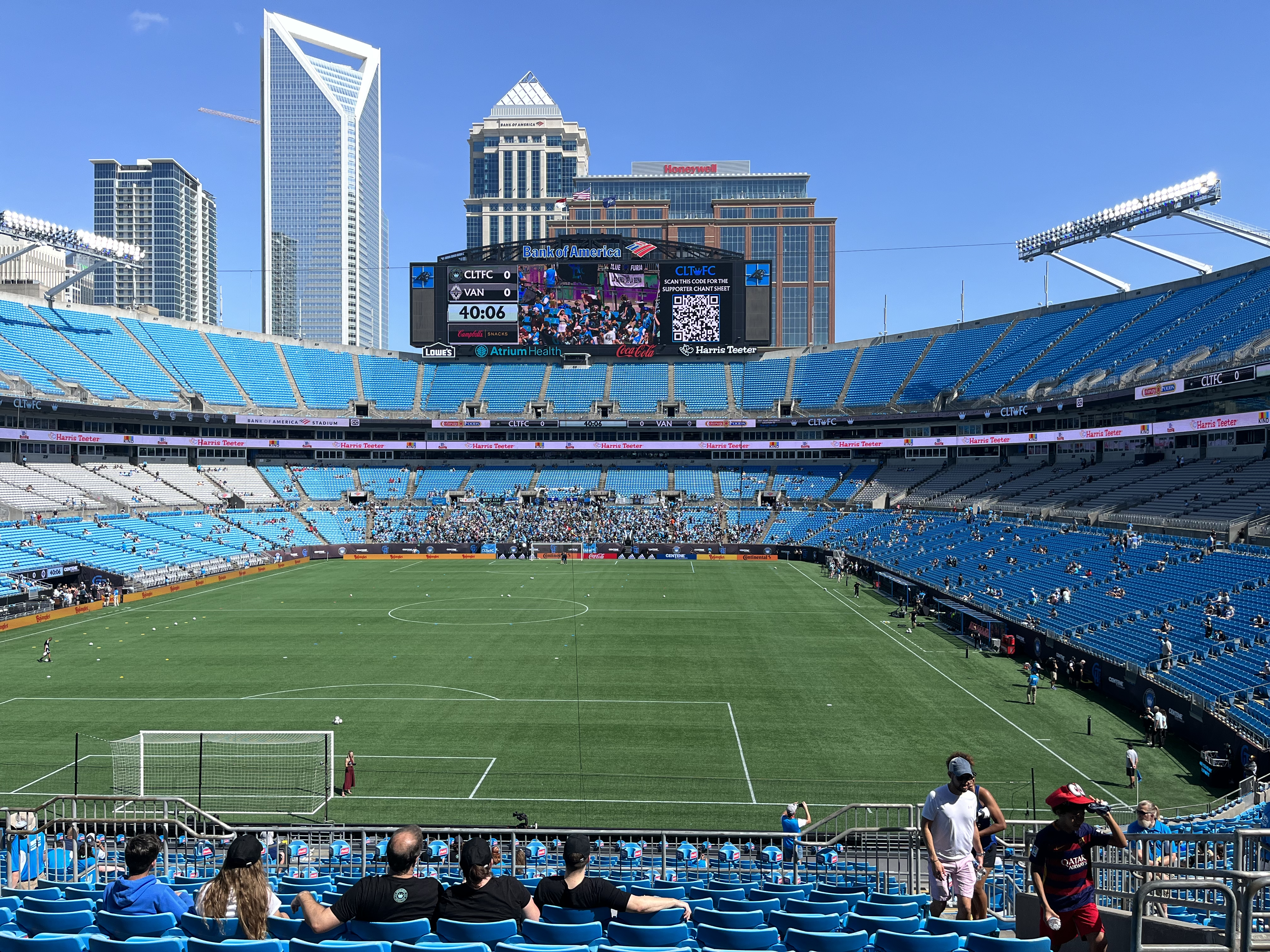
The stadium configured for a Charlotte FC match

Major League Soccer awarded an expansion team to Charlotte that started play in 2022 as Charlotte FC at Bank of America Stadium, following renovations. The stadium saw its first MLS-related action when it played host to matches between Charlotte FC's and Atlanta United's academy teams on October 31, 2020. The team made their home debut on March 5, 2022, in front of 74,479 spectators, setting a new MLS record for stand-alone match attendance. Most Charlotte FC matches only use the lower bowl and club level, capping capacity at 38,000.

=== Other soccer matches ===
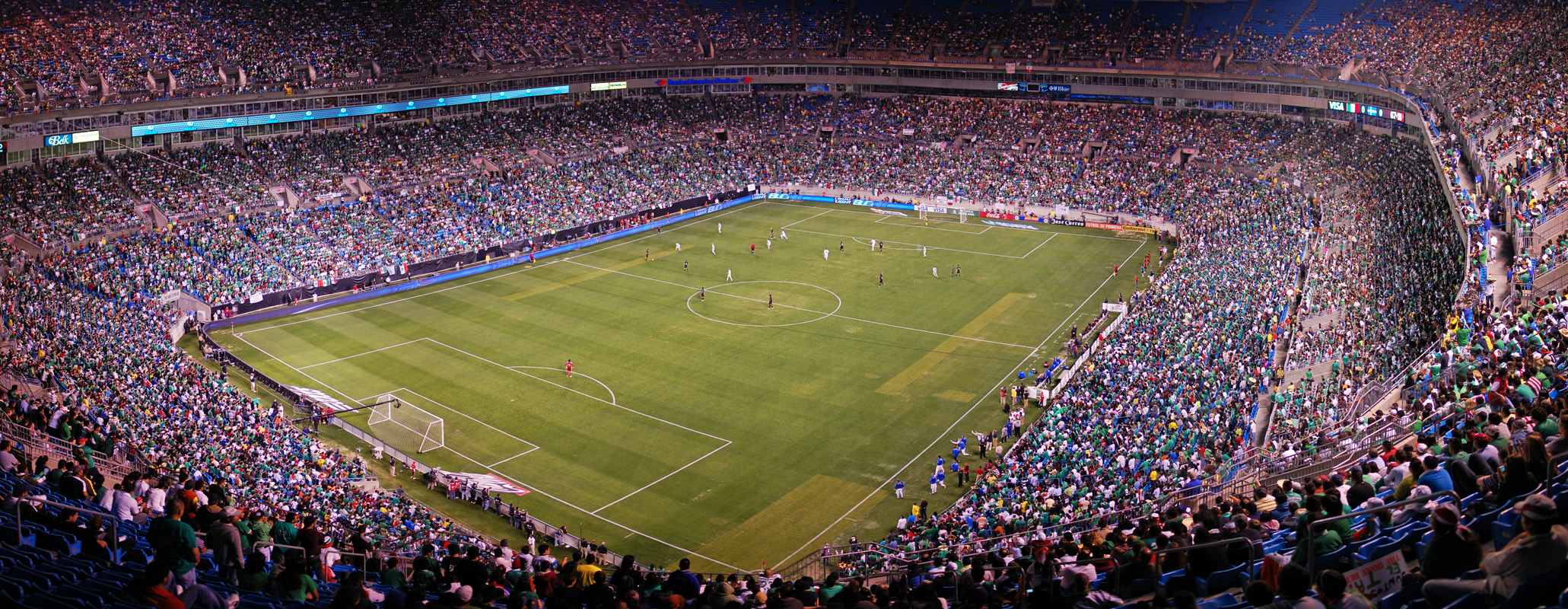
Mexico vs Iceland, 2010

Before Charlotte FC's arrival, Bank of America Stadium was no stranger to hosting soccer matches. The stadium hosted the NCAA Men's Soccer Championship in 1999 and 2000. Despite this, it took until 2010 for soccer matches to become a regular occurrence. Most matches since then have featured international teams. The International Champions Cup stages annual international club friendlies at the stadium as part of a long-term contract with Relevent Sports Group. Among the clubs who have played at the stadium include clubs from the Premier League, Bundesliga and various national teams.

=== International and club friendly matches ===
Date	Winning Team	Result	Losing Team	Tournament	Spectators
March 24, 2010	Mexico	0–0	Iceland	International Friendly	63,227
June 9, 2011	Costa Rica	1–1	El Salvador	2011 CONCACAF Gold Cup Group A	46,012
June 9, 2011	Mexico	5–0	Cuba	2011 CONCACAF Gold Cup Group A	46,012
August 2, 2014	(England) Liverpool	2–0	(Italy) Milan	2014 International Champions Cup	69,364
July 15, 2015	Cuba	1–0	Guatemala	2015 CONCACAF Gold Cup Group C	55,823
July 15, 2015	Mexico	4–4	Trinidad and Tobago	2015 CONCACAF Gold Cup Group C	55,823
July 25, 2015	(England) Chelsea	1–1 (6–5 pen.)	(France) Paris Saint-Germain	2015 International Champions Cup	61,224
July 30, 2016	(Germany) Bayern Munich	4–1	(Italy) Inter Milan	2016 International Champions Cup	53,629
July 22, 2018	(Germany) Borussia Dortmund	3–1	(England) Liverpool	2018 International Champions Cup	55,447
June 23, 2019	Canada	7–0	Cuba	2019 CONCACAF Gold Cup Group A	59,283
June 23, 2019	Mexico	3–2	Martinique	2019 CONCACAF Gold Cup Group A	59,283
July 20, 2019	(England) Arsenal	3–0	(Italy) Fiorentina	2019 International Champions Cup	34,902
October 3, 2019	United States	2–0	South Korea	Women's International Friendly	30,071
March 26, 2020	Mexico	cancelled due to COVID-19 pandemic	Czech Republic	International Friendly	N/A
October 27, 2021	Ecuador	3–2	Mexico	International Friendly	39,887
July 20, 2022	(United States) Charlotte FC	1–1 (5–3 pen.)	(England) Chelsea	Club Friendly	52,673
July 2, 2023	United States	6–0	Trinidad and Tobago	2023 CONCACAF Gold Cup Group A	40,243
July 2, 2023	Honduras	2–1	Haiti	2023 CONCACAF Gold Cup Group B	47,382
October 14, 2023	Mexico	2–0	Ghana	International Friendly	60,963
July 10, 2024	Colombia	1–0	Uruguay	2024 Copa América semifinal	70,644
July 13, 2024	Uruguay	2–2 (4–3 pen.)	Canada	2024 Copa América third place	24,386
August 6, 2024	(Spain) Real Madrid	2–1	(England) Chelsea	Club Friendly	62,617
June 22, 2025	(Spain) Real Madrid	3–1	(Mexico) Pachuca	2025 FIFA Club World Cup Group H	70,248
June 24, 2025	(Portugal) Benfica	1–0	(Germany) Bayern Munich	2025 FIFA Club World Cup Group C	33,287
June 28, 2025	(England) Chelsea	4–1 (a.e.t)	(Portugal) Benfica	2025 FIFA Club World Cup Round of 16	25,929
June 30, 2025	(Brazil) Fluminense	2–0	(Italy) Inter Milan	2025 FIFA Club World Cup Round of 16	20,030
May 31, 2026	United States	3–2	Senegal	International Friendly	57,741
July 30, 2026	(United States) (Canada) MLS All-Stars	4–3	(Mexico) Liga MX All-Stars	2026 MLS All-Star Game	35,197

== Concerts ==
Concerts at the stadium were a rarity for many years. Most acts performed at the Spectrum Center or at other performing venues in Charlotte. After David Tepper bought the Panthers (and therefore the stadium) in 2018, concerts became more commonplace.

Date	Performer(s)	Opening act(s)	Tour/Event	Attendance	Revenue	Notes
October 10, 1997	The Rolling Stones	Blues Traveler	Bridges to Babylon Tour	54,436 / 54,436	$3,126,945	First act to play a concert at the stadium
June 24, 2012	Kenny Chesney and Tim McGraw	Grace Potter and the Nocturnals; Jake Owen	Brothers of the Sun Tour	44,482 / 47,835	$3,404,455	
September 30, 2021	The Rolling Stones	Ghost Hounds	No Filter Tour	42,577 / 42,577	$9,074,182	
April 23, 2022	Billy Joel	—N/a	Billy Joel in Concert			
April 30, 2022	Kenny Chesney	Dan + Shay; Old Dominion; Carly Pearce	Here and Now Tour			
June 28, 2022	Mötley Crüe; Def Leppard	Poison; Joan Jett and the Blackhearts	The Stadium Tour			Initially scheduled for 2020, but postponed due to the COVID-19 pandemic
July 15, 2022	Garth Brooks	—N/a	The Garth Brooks Stadium Tour			Special appearance from Trisha Yearwood
July 16, 2022	Garth Brooks	—N/a	The Garth Brooks Stadium Tour			Special appearance from Trisha Yearwood
September 1, 2022	Red Hot Chili Peppers	The Strokes; Thundercat	2022 Global Stadium Tour	43,269 / 43,269	$5,279,810	
September 18, 2022	Elton John	—N/a	Farewell Yellow Brick Road Tour			
July 14, 2023	Luke Combs	Gary Allan; Turnpike Troubadours; Brent Cobb	Luke Combs World Tour			
July 15, 2023	Luke Combs	Riley Green; Lainey Wilson; Brent Cobb; Flatland Cavalry	Luke Combs World Tour			
August 9, 2023	Beyoncé	—N/a	Renaissance World Tour	53,612 / 53,612	$12,227,012	Highest-grossing boxscore report in the stadium's history. First female act and black artist to headline a concert.
April 27, 2024	Kenny Chesney; Zac Brown Band	Megan Moroney; Uncle Kracker	Sun Goes Down 2024 Tour			
June 1, 2024	George Strait; Chris Stapleton	Little Big Town				
October 18, 2024	Morgan Wallen	Lauren Watkins; Larry Fleet; Bailey Zimmerman	One Night At A Time Tour			
October 19, 2024	Morgan Wallen	Lauren Watkins; Larry Fleet; Bailey Zimmerman	One Night At A Time Tour			
October 26, 2024	Luke Combs; Eric Church; Billy Strings; James Taylor; Sheryl Crow; Keith Urban; Bailey Zimmerman; Chase Rice; Parmalee; Scotty McCreery	—N/a	Concert for Carolina	82,193		Benefit concert for damage caused by Hurricane Helene
May 3, 2025	Kendrick Lamar; SZA	Mustard	Grand National Tour			
May 13, 2025	Shakira	Wyclef Jean; D-Nice	Las Mujeres Ya No Lloran World Tour			First Latin act to perform a show at the stadium.
May 31, 2025	Metallica	Pantera; Suicidal Tendencies	M72 World Tour			
April 18, 2026	Zach Bryan	Caamp; J.R. Carroll	With Heaven on Tour			
April 29, 2026	Bruno Mars	DJ Pee .Wee; Leon Thomas	The Romantic Tour			
June 9, 2026	Post Malone	Jelly Roll; Carter Faith	Big Ass Stadium Tour			
July 11, 2026	AC/DC	The Pretty Reckless	Power Up Tour			
July 17, 2026	Usher; Chris Brown		The R&B Tour			
July 18, 2026	Usher; Chris Brown		The R&B Tour			
October 17, 2026	Ed Sheeran	Lukas Graham; Aaron Rowe	Loop Tour			Macklemore was removed as an opening act when Bank of America Stadium and other venues would not allow him to perform.

== Other events ==
- A four-day Billy Graham crusade was held at the stadium in 1996.
- The closing night of the 2012 Democratic National Convention, in which President Barack Obama was expected to deliver his acceptance speech for the Democratic Party presidential nomination, was to be held at the stadium on September 6, 2012. However, due to predicted thunderstorms, it was relocated to Spectrum Center.
- The stadium hosted the inaugural Untappd Beer Festival on May 4, 2019. It was going to host the second festival on May 16, 2020; however, the festival was postponed due to COVID-19.
- The 14th annual Beer, Bourbon and BBQ Festival was hosted by the stadium on March 7, 2020.
- The stadium served as a COVID-19 vaccination site from January 29–31 and March 9–11, 2021.
- Bank of America Stadium hosted the Topgolf Live Stadium Series from March 25–28, 2021.
- The stadium hosted the Savannah Bananas on June 6 and 7, 2025. Both events sold out.

== Future ==
Although no time frame has been given, Panthers and Charlotte FC owner David Tepper has expressed interest in constructing a new stadium for the teams in Uptown Charlotte, with Bank of America Stadium eventually being demolished. Tepper noted in 2019 that while the Stadium was well-preserved and well-landscaped, the growing maintenance expense after decades of use led him to joke that it would be cheaper to give the stadium away. Although the stadium's design was ahead of its time, it's now considered obsolete as the design lacks open concourses (allowing fans to stand and watch games from bars and other group areas) and a retractable roof. And while Bank of America Stadium was designed mostly for football under then-owner Jerry Richardson, Tepper has preferred that its replacement be multipurpose with a retractable roof in order to accommodate his MLS soccer team, concerts, major conventions, and NCAA Final Four basketball. In 2022, Tepper said another major renovation was under consideration. This renovation would apparently give the stadium two or three more decades of use.

Plans also include creating an entertainment district between the future stadium and the future Gateway Station, an $800 million intermodal transit station currently under construction.

In June 2024, the Panthers unveiled plans for an over $800 million renovation to the stadium. Upgrades would include new exterior video displays, seating, lighting, new concourses, and numerous other improvements. Construction is expected to start in 2026 with completion expected by 2029.

== See also ==
- Lists of stadiums

Events and tenants
Preceded by Clemson Memorial Stadium	Home of the Carolina Panthers; 1996–present	Succeeded by current
Preceded by first stadium	Home of Charlotte FC; 2022–present	Succeeded by current
Preceded by CenturyLink Field	Host of NFC Championship Game; 2016	Succeeded by Georgia Dome
Preceded by Raymond James Stadium	Host of the ACC Championship Game; 2010–2015	Succeeded by Camping World Stadium
Preceded by Richmond Stadium	Host of the College Cup; 1999–2000	Succeeded by Columbus Crew Stadium
