= James Lytle (coach) =

American football coach

Biographical details
- Born: February 22, 1901; Union County, North Carolina, U.S.
- Died: July 17, 1987 (aged 86); Raleigh, North Carolina, U.S.

Playing career

Football
- 1920s: Shaw

Basketball
- 1920s: Shaw

Baseball
- 1920s: Shaw
- Position: End (football)

Coaching career (HC unless noted)

Football
- 1927: Morris Brown
- 1928–1929: Shaw
- 1930–1931: Arkansas AM&N
- 1934–1945: Shaw

Basketball
- 1928–1930: Shaw

Baseball
- 1929–1930: Shaw
- ?–1978: Shaw

Administrative career (AD unless noted)
- 1957–1978: Shaw

Head coaching record
- Overall: 45–56–1 (football)

James E. Lytle Jr. (February 22, 1901 – July 17, 1987) was an American football, basketball, baseball, and golf coach and college athletics administrator. He served as the head football coach at Morris Brown College in Atlanta in 1927, Shaw University from 1928 to 1929 and again from 1934 to 1954, and Arkansas Agricultural, Mechanical & Normal College (Arkansas AM&N)—now known as University of Arkansas at Pine Bluff—from 1930 to 1931. Lytle was also the athletic director at Shaw from 1957 to 1978.

Lytle graduated from Shaw in 1921 and later earned a Master of Arts degree in physical education from Columbia University.

In 1975, Lytle was the first person inducted into the Shaw University Athletic Hall of Fame. In 1993, he was inducted into the North Carolina Sports Hall of Fame. Lytle died on July 17, 1987, following an illness.

== Head coaching record ==
=== Football ===
Year	Team	Overall	Conference	Standing	Bowl/playoffs
Morris Brown Wolverines (Southern Intercollegiate Athletic Conference) (1927)
1927	Morris Brown	2–3–2	1–3–1	T–8th	
Morris Brown:		2–3–2	1–3–1		
Shaw Bears (Colored Intercollegiate Athletic Association) (1928–1929)
1928	Shaw	1–6–1	1–3–1	7th	
1929	Shaw	1–4–1	0–4–1	7th	
Arkansas AM&N Lions (Independent) (1930–1931)
1930	Arkansas AM&N	7–1			
1931	Arkansas AM&N	4–3			
Arkansas AM&N:		11–4			
Shaw Bears (Colored Intercollegiate Athletic Association) (1934–1945)
1934	Shaw	1–6–1	1–6	11th	
1935	Shaw	4–4	3–3	8th	
1936	Shaw	5–3–1	3–2	5th	
1937	Shaw	4–3	4–3	6th	
1938	Shaw	6–1–2	4–1–2	3rd	
1939	Shaw	4–5	3–5	10th	
1940	Shaw	2–5–2	2–4–2	T–8th	
1941	Shaw	4–4–1	4–3–1	6th	
1942	Shaw	0–1	0–0	NA	
1943	No team—World War II				
1944	No team—World War II				
1945	Shaw	0–7	0–6	13th	
Shaw:		32–49–9	25–40–7		
Total:		45–56–11			
