= Jerry Steele =

American basketball player-coach (1939–2021)

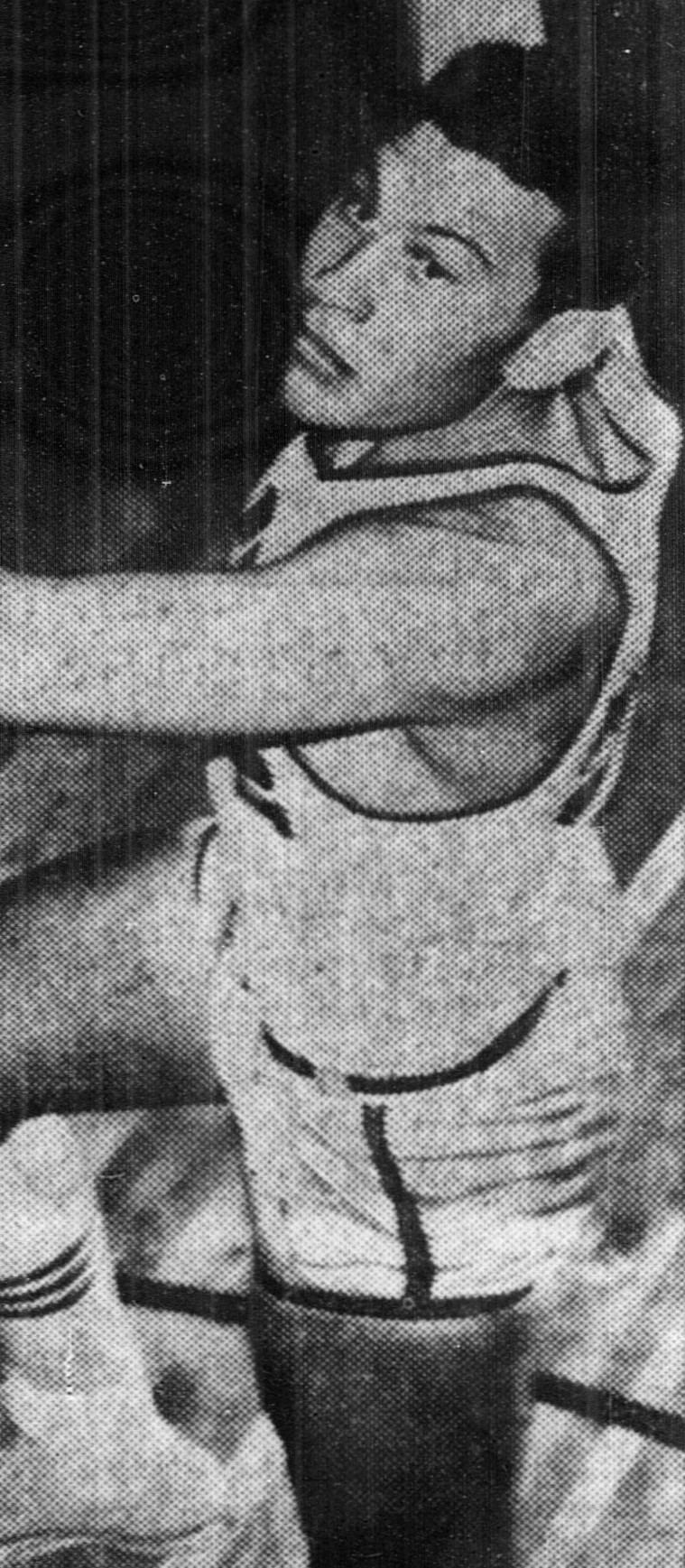
- Steele, circa 1960

Biographical details
- Born: March 10, 1939; Elkin, North Carolina, U.S.
- Died: July 11, 2021 (aged 82)

Playing career
- 1958–1961: Wake Forest

Coaching career (HC unless noted)
- 1962–1970: Guilford
- 1970–1971: Carolina Cougars
- 1972–2003: High Point

Administrative career (AD unless noted)
- 1978–2003: High Point

Head coaching record
- Overall: 609–486 (college); 17–25 (ABA)

Jerry Steele (March 10, 1939 – July 11, 2021) was an American basketball player and coach and college athletics administrator. He served as the head men's basketball coach at Guilford College in Greensboro, North Carolina from 1962 to 1970 and High Point University in High Point, North Carolina from 1972 to 2003, compiling a career college basketball coaching record of 609–486. Steele was also the head coach of the Carolina Cougars of the American Basketball Association (ABA) for half of one season, 1970–71, tallying a mark of 17–25.

== Early life and playing career ==
A native of Elkin, North Carolina, he played basketball at Wake Forest University from 1958 to 1961 and in two of those years he was a member of the Atlantic Coast Conference All-Academic team. After graduating from Wake Forest, Steele earned his master's degree from University of North Carolina at Chapel Hill.

== Coaching career ==
=== Guilford ===
Steele took over as the men's basketball coach at Guilford College in 1962. His first season with the Quakers, he finished with a 5–20 record. Steele then led the Quakers to two conference titles, four district championships, and four trips to the NAIA Tournament. During the 1969–70 season, the Quakers won 29 straight games, finishing 32–4 and fourth in the nation.

=== Carolina Cougars ===
In 1970 Steele joined the Carolina Cougars of the American Basketball Association (ABA) as an assistant coach under Bones McKinney. In November 1970, after the Cougars started the season with a record of 17–25, McKinney was dismissed and Steele was promoted to head coach. Steele's record for the remainder of the season matched that of McKinney: 17–25. The Cougars finished the 1970–71 season with an overall record of 34–50, placing sixth in the ABA's Eastern Division and missing the playoffs. After season concluded, Steele moved on to become director of player personnel for the Cougars and was replaced as head coach by Tom Meschery.

=== High Point ===
In 1972, Steele became the head coach at High Point University. Among his early players was future High Point head coach Tubby Smith. Steele coached at High Point for 32 years, from 1972 to 2003. During his tenure, High Point won eight conference titles, made one appearance in the NAIA Men's Basketball Championships, and earned two trips to the NCAA Division II men's basketball tournament. His record at High Point was 457–412. He also served as athletic director at High Point for 21 years, from 1978 to 1999. Steele retired after the end of the 2002–03 season.

== Personal life ==
Steele was elected to the NAIA Hall of Fame in 1987. In 2002 Steele was inducted into the North Carolina Sports Hall of Fame. In 2005 Steele was inducted into the Guilford County, North Carolina Sports Hall of Fame.

He died on July 11, 2021.

== Head coaching record ==
=== College ===
Record table
Season	Team	Overall	Conference	Standing	Postseason
Guilford Quakers (Carolinas Intercollegiate Athletic Conference) (1962–1970)
1962–63	Guilford	5–20			
1963–64	Guilford	14–12			
1964–65	Guilford	17–8			
1965–66	Guilford	18–8			
1966–67	Guilford	26–7			
1967–68	Guilford	25–5			
1968–69	Guilford	13–11			
1969–70	Guilford	32–5			
Guilford:		150–76 (.664)			
High Point Panthers (Carolinas Intercollegiate Athletic Conference / Carolinas-Virginia Athletics Conference) (1972–1997)
1972–73	High Point	11–15	6–8		
1973–74	High Point	8–19	4–10		
1974–75	High Point	15–15	7–7		
1975–76	High Point	12–14	6–8		
1976–77	High Point	13–14	7–7		
1977–78	High Point	16–14	9–5		
1978–79	High Point	27–6	11–3		NAIA second round
1979–80	High Point	22–8	12–2		
1980–81	High Point	16–12	8–6		
1981–82	High Point	15–10	8–6		
1982–83	High Point	6–19	3–10		
1983–84	High Point	15–9	9–6		
1984–85	High Point	18–12	9–5		
1985–86	High Point	11–17	5–9		
1986–87	High Point	18–11	9–5		
1987–88	High Point	22–6	11–3		
1988–89	High Point	22–6	12–2		
1989–90	High Point	8–17	3–11		
1990–91	High Point	12–18	5–9		
1991–92	High Point	16–14	7–7		
1992–93	High Point	12–15	3–8		
1993–94	High Point	21–8	10–4		
1994–95	High Point	20–9	8–6		
1995–96	High Point	24–7	16–2		NCAA Division II Regional semifinal
1996–97	High Point	18–12	11–7		NCAA Division II Regional semifinal
High Point Panthers (Big South Conference) (1997–2003)
1997–98	High Point	12–13			
1998–99	High Point	10–16			
1999–00	High Point	11–17	5–9	6th	
2000–01	High Point	8–20	3–11	8th	
2001–02	High Point	11–19	5–9	T–6th	
2002–03	High Point	7–20	3–11	8th	
High Point:		459–412 (.527)	404–196 (.673)		
Total:		609–486 (.556)			
National champion Postseason invitational champion Conference regular season champion Conference regular season and conference tournament champion Division regular season champion Division regular season and conference tournament champion Conference tournament champion

=== ABA ===
Legend
Regular season	G	Games coached	W	Games won	L	Games lost	W–L %	Win–loss %
Playoffs	PG	Playoff games	PW	Playoff wins	PL	Playoff losses	PW–L %	Playoff win–loss %

Team	Year	G	W	L	W–L%	Finish	PG	PW	PL	PW–L%	Result
Carolina	1970-71	42	17	25	.405	6th in Eastern	-	-	-	-	
Career		42	17	25	.405		-	-	-	-	

== See also ==
- List of college men's basketball coaches with 600 wins
