= Statue of Calvin Griffith =

Statue taken down during George Floyd protests

- Year: 2010
- Subject: Calvin Griffith
- Location: Minneapolis, Minnesota, U.S.; 44.98033°N 93.27758°W

A statue of former Minnesota Twins baseball team owner Calvin Griffith stood in front of Target Field in Minneapolis, Minnesota from 2010 until 2020.

== History ==
Griffith inherited the Washington Senators from his adoptive father in 1955. The team changed its name and moved to Minnesota in 1961. Griffith spoke about the move in 1978: "I'll tell you why we came to Minnesota. It was when I found out you only had 15,000 blacks here. Black people don't go to ballgames, but they'll fill up a rassling ring and put up such a chant it'll scare you to death. It's unbelievable. We came here because you’ve got good, hardworking, white people here." The statue was installed in 2010.

=== Removal ===
In 2020, following a wave of protests sparked by the murder of George Floyd, the Minnesota Twins announced the removal of Griffith's statue at Target Field, stating "While we acknowledge the prominent role Calvin Griffith played in our history, we cannot remain silent and continue ignoring the racist comments he made in Waseca in 1978. His disparaging words displayed a blatant intolerance and disregard for the Black community that are the antithesis of what the Minnesota Twins stand for and value."

After the statue was removed, Rod Carew released a statement claiming "I've always supported the Twins decision to honor Calvin with a statue" and "I saw no signs of racism whatsoever" when playing with the Minnesota Twins during Griffith's time as owner. Carew also noted that Griffith paid him well and that he was traded to the California Angels because "Calvin told me he wanted me to be paid what I was worth." Carew also stated “In 1991, the first person I called after I was told I had been elected to the National Baseball Hall of Fame was Calvin. I have long forgiven Cal for his insensitive comments and do not believe he was a racist. That was NOT my personal experience with Calvin Griffith – prior to or following that day in 1978."

== See also ==
- George Floyd protests in Minneapolis–Saint Paul
- List of monuments and memorials removed during the George Floyd protests
- Statue of Jerry Richardson
