= James D. Garrison =

American literary scholar

James D. Garrison is an American literary scholar and University Distinguished Teaching Professor at the University of Texas at Austin. His research primarily focuses on 18th-century British literature, rhetoric, and intersections between literature and law.

== Education and Career ==
Garrison earned his B.A. from Stanford University and a Ph.D. from the University of California, Berkeley. He serves as a professor in the Department of English at UT Austin, where he has received recognition for teaching excellence.Faculty profile at UT Austin

== Publications ==
Dryden and the Tradition of Panegyric (1975)Garrison, James D. (1975). Dryden and the Tradition of Panegyric. University of California Press.

A Dangerous Liberty: Translating Gray's Elegy (2009)Garrison, James D. (2009). A Dangerous Liberty: Translating Gray's Elegy. University of Delaware Press.

The American Sublime: The Genealogy of a Poetic Genre (2018)Garrison, James D. (2018). The American Sublime: The Genealogy of a Poetic Genre. Cambridge University Press.

== Research Interests ==
18th-century British literature

History of rhetoric

Law and literature

== Honors ==
University Distinguished Teaching Professor, UT Austin
