= Maxine Allen =

American bowler (1913–1995)

Maxine Allen (November 7, 1913 – September 16, 1995.) was an American bowler specializing in duckpin bowling, although when duckpin lanes began disappearing in the 1960s she switched to in ten pins. Born in West Virginia, Allen attended the Woman's College of the University of North Carolina (now known as University of North Carolina at Greensboro) from 1931 until 1935.. She began bowling when she was a school teacher in Seaboard, North Carolina.

She won several major tournaments, including the United States Classic, the Dixie Classic and the National Duckpin Bowling Congress All Events Championship. She lived briefly in Phoenix, Arizona, and was Arizona Women's Bowling Association Champion in 1954 and 1955.. She held more than 50 world records in duckpins for best scores in sets of consecutive games..

During the 1940s and 1950s she won several national titles in ninepin bowling. Allen was inducted into the National Duckpin Bowling Congress Hall of Fame in 1962, the North Carolina Sports Hall of Fame in 1972, the University of North Carolina at Greensboro Sports Hall of Fame in 2001, and the Guilford County Sports Hall of Fame in 2006. She died in Greensboro, North Carolina, in 1995..
