= Guilford Quakers =

- University: Guilford College
- Nickname: Quakers
- NCAA: Division III
- Conference: Old Dominion Athletic Conference
- Location: Greensboro, North Carolina, United States
- Varsity teams: 18
- Football stadium: Appenzeller Field (Note: Complete name, "Appenzeller Field at the Armfield Athletic Center".)
- Basketball arena: Ragan-Brown Field House
- Baseball stadium: Edgar H. McBane Field
- Softball stadium: Haworth Field
- Soccer stadium: Appenzeller Field
- Aquatics center: Greensboro Aquatic Center
- Lacrosse stadium: Appenzeller Field
- Golf course: The Cardinal by Pete Dye
- Tennis venue: Centennial Class Courts
- Volleyball arena: Ragan-Brown Field House
- Colors: Crimson and Gray
- Mascot: Nathan the Quaker
- Fight song: On Brave Ol’ Guilford Team
- Website: guilfordquakers.com

The Guilford Quakers are the athletic teams that represent Guilford College, located in Greensboro, North Carolina, United States in NCAA Division III intercollegiate sports. The Quakers compete as members of the Old Dominion Athletic Conference. Altogether, Guilford sponsors 18 sports: nine each for men and women, respectively.

== Varsity teams ==
Men's sports	Women's sports
Baseball	Basketball
Basketball	Cross country
Cross country	Field hockey
Football	Lacrosse
Golf	Rugby
Lacrosse	Soccer
Soccer	Softball
Tennis	Swimming
Track and field	Tennis
	Track and field
	Triathlon
	Volleyball

== Championships ==
Despite its small size, Guilford College has achieved great athletics success over the course of the school's history. Guilford teams have won five team national championships and one individual national title.

=== 1972–73 Men's Basketball ===
After building a nationally competitive team in the late 1960s and early 1970s, Guilford finally cracked through to win its first national championship in 1972–73. Under the direction of third-year head coach Jack Jensen, the unseeded Quakers (29-5) completed an improbable run through the NAIA Tournament field with a 99–96 win over eighth-seeded Maryland-Eastern Shore in Kansas City, Mo. Three student-athletes from the 1972-73 team played in the NBA: M.L. Carr '73, World B. Free '76 and Greg Jackson '74. Seven have been inducted into the Guilford College Athletics Hall of Fame, including Free, the 1973 Chuck Taylor NAIA Tournament MVP.

=== 1980–81 Women's Tennis ===
The 1980-81 women's tennis team shared the inaugural NAIA championship with Grand Canyon (Ariz.) University for the school's second national title. Under the direction of fourth-year head coach Gayle Currie, the Quakers earned 27 team points. Currie garnered co-National Coach of the Year honors with Marlene Bjornsrud from Grand Canyon.

=== Tarja Koho, 1981–82 Women's Tennis National Singles Champion ===
While Guilford lost the NAIA team title to Westmont College (Calif.), 28–25, freshman Tarja Koho finished the season with a perfect 31–0 record in singles competition. The Finland native earned the tournament's top seed after cruising through the regular season and District 26 Tournament without losing a set, a streak she continued through the national tournament.

=== 1988–89 Men's Golf ===
After coming in second to Huntingdon College from 1985 to 1987, Guilford rebounded to beat the Hawks and take the NAIA Championship in 1989. Mike Hutcheon '89 placed third with a three-round total of 219. Classmate Lee Porter took 12th with a 299, while juniors Jed Venhuizen and Mitch Clodfelter took 17th and 24th, with a 302 and 304, respectively. The title made coach Jack Jensen just the second coach in NAIA history to coach national championship teams in two different sports.

=== 2001–02 Men's Golf ===
After taking second in the 2001 championships by one stroke, Guilford won the first National Collegiate Athletic Association (NCAA) Division III Championship in school history. The Quakers trailed first-place Methodist College by three strokes after three rounds, but rallied to clinch first place by six strokes on the last day. Coach Jack Jensen received his second Eaton Golf Pride National Coach of the Year Award after the victory. Dave Patterson paced the Quakers with a 295 that placed second among individuals. Andrew Biggadike '02 joined Patterson as a First Team All-American by shooting 299, good enough for sixth place. Classmate Savio Nazareth '03 placed 18th with a 306.

=== 2004–05 Men's Golf ===
Guilford placed three students among the top-five finishers and won the 22-team tournament by 25 strokes, the seventh-largest margin in National Collegiate Athletic Association (NCAA) Division III history. The Quakers' Colin Clark '07 won a playoff over teammate Dave Patterson to take medalist honors and become the Quakers' third national champion. Brant Stovall '11 placed fifth with a 294.

== Mascot ==
Origins of the school mascot, "Quaker Man", are predictably based on Guilford's founding by the Society of Friends, commonly referred to as Quakers.

From the late 1890s to the early 1950s a few students attached to the cheerleading squad would attend football games dressed in the traditional garb of 18th and 19th century Quakers. Whenever the team scored a touchdown, a designated “Quaker Man” would dry-fire a musket.

Regarding a logo, since the late 1950s the athletics department had been using the Quaker Oats Company logo, fashioned after William Penn, often as a shoulder patch on varsity jackets. But in 1968, athletics department staffer John Lambeth called for a redesign and a "mean-looking" Quaker caricature was chosen among several hand drawn entries.

The new logo became controversial when some coaches modified “mean Quaker” to hold items such as a tennis racket or lacrosse stick, or when he was redrawn as crouched in a football lineman stance. Owing to the lack of overall brand cohesiveness the primary logo for all sports teams eventually reverted to the school's crimson and gray initial “G.”

However, use of the caricature “mean Quaker” logo continued on as a secondary brand-mark, and is still employed as a design element on various team uniforms and gear, college-branded apparel and accessories, and on official letterhead of the athletics booster organization, the Quaker Club.

Since around the year 2000, the mascot has been referred to as "Nathan the Quaker", after school founder Nathan Hunt. A costumed “Quaker" has appeared at sporting events dating back to late 1980s.

From 2022 to 2023, the Quaker Man was portrayed by Henry Freeman.

== Notable athletes and coaches ==
- Herb Appenzeller
- M.L. Carr
- Rick Ferrell
- World B. Free
- Henry Freeman
- Bob Kauffman
- Dave Odom
- Tony Womack
- Zack Hample
- Hunter Yurachek
