= Ronnie Barnes (American football) =

American football player (born 1952)

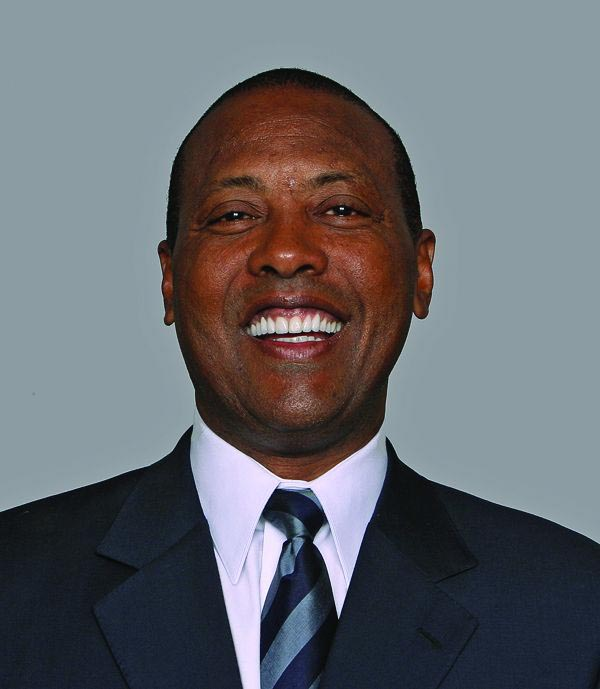
- Barnes in 2022

New York Giants
- Title: Senior Vice President of Medical Services and Training Staff

Personal information
- Born: February 15, 1952 (age 74); North Carolina, U.S.

Career information
- College: East Carolina University, Michigan State University

Career history
- ECU (1975) Assistant Athletic Trainer; Michigan State University (1975-1977) Graduate Assistant Athletic Trainer; Michigan State Spartans football (1977-1980) Head Athletic Trainer; New York Giants (1976–1979) Athletic Training Intern; New York Giants (1980) Assistant Athletic Trainer; New York Giants (1981–2009) Head Athletic Trainer; New York Giants (2009–2026) Head Athletic Trainer and Senior Vice President of Medical Services; New York Giants (2026–present) Senior Vice President of Medical Services & Training Staff

Awards and highlights
- 4× Super Bowl champion (XXI, XXV, XLII, XLVI); 2× National Professional Athletic Trainer of the Year (1983, 1987); ECU Athletics Hall of Fame (1990); National Athletic Trainers Association Hall of Fame (1999); North Carolina Sports Hall of Fame (2022); New York Giants Ring of Honor (2022)

Ronnie P. Barnes (born February 15, 1952) is an American football athletic trainer who is the Senior Vice President of Medical Services & Training Staff for the New York Giants of the National Football League (NFL). He has been with the organization since 1976. He graduated from East Carolina University in 1975, and was the first African-American Head Athletic Trainer in the NFL.

== Early life and education ==
Ronnie Barnes was born on February 15, 1952, in North Carolina. He attended East Carolina University and graduated in 1975. He was an assistant athletic trainer for the football team in 1975 after his graduation. He later went to Michigan State University to get a master's degree.

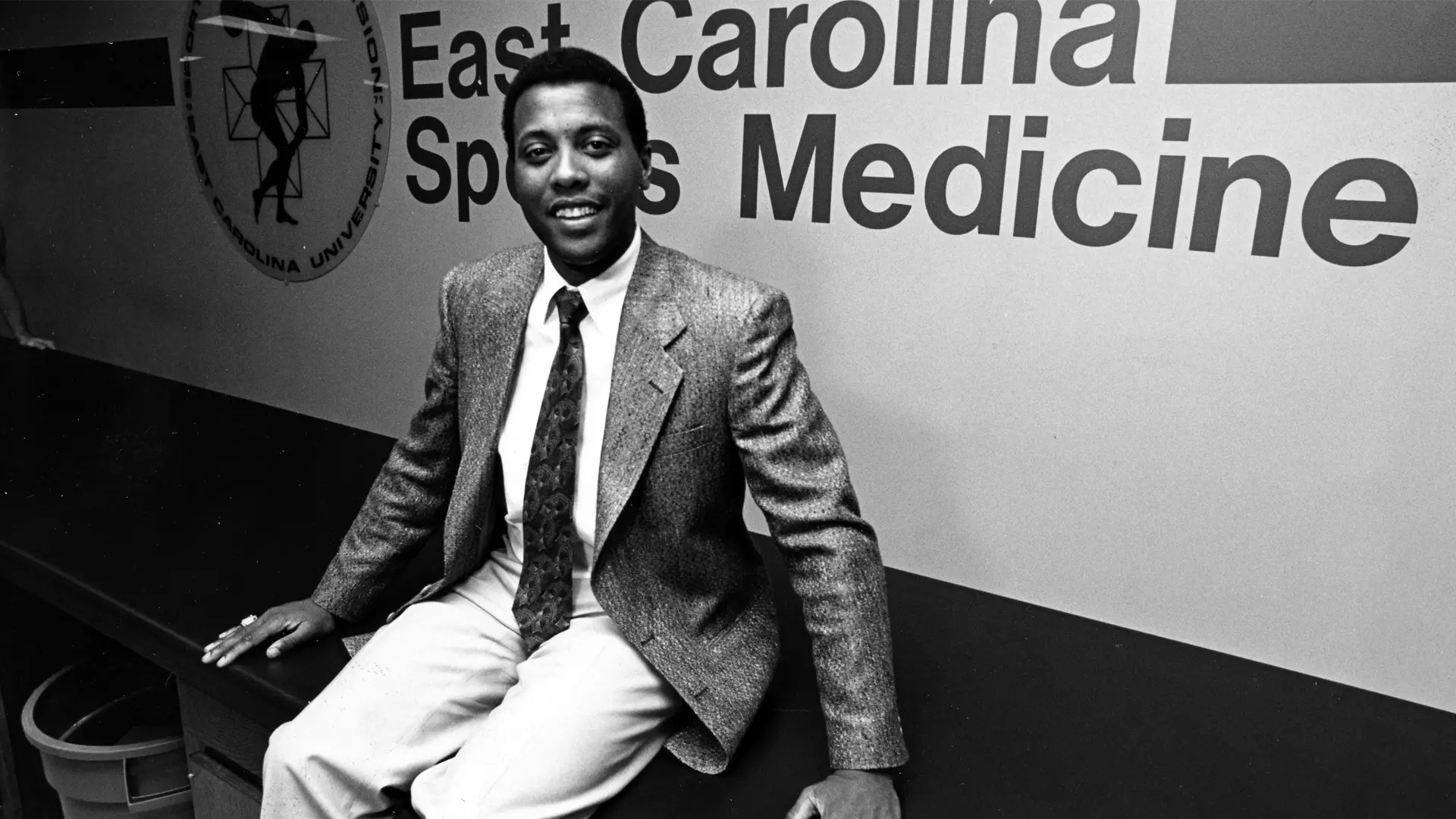
Barnes as a student at Eastern Carolina University (1975)

== Professional career ==
In 1976, Barnes became an athletic training intern for the New York Giants. He was promoted to a full time Assistant Athletic Trainer in 1980 and to Head Athletic Trainer in 1981.

From 2009 to 2022, when Barnes was Head Athletic Trainer and Senior Vice President of Medical Services, the Giants were the most injured team in the league according to USA Today, losing more players for more games than any other team in the NFL. During this time, scientific studies developed regarding increased friction with artificial turf leading to more noncontact, or pivoting injuries. Online theories especially target MetLife stadium for their artificial turf.

In 2026, Adam Bennett took over as Head Athletic Trainer. As part of this restructuring, Barnes retained his Senior Vice President title, the team announced.

He won the National Professional Athletic Trainer of the Year award in 1983 and 1987. Barnes was named to the ECU Athletics Hall of Fame in 1990 and the National Athletics Trainers Association Hall of Fame in 1999. Barnes won Super Bowls XXI, XXV, XLII, and XLVI with the Giants. He was given a lifetime achievement award in 2019 he was inducted into the Giants Ring of Honor in 2022.

== Awards ==
- ECU Athletics Hall of Fame (1990)
- National Athletic Trainers Association Hall of Fame (1999)
- North Carolina Sports Hall of Fame (2022)
- 4x Super Bowl champion
- Lifetime Achievement Award
- 2x National Professional Athletic Trainer of the Year (1983, 1987)
- New York Giants Ring of Honor (2022)
