= Fred Whitfield (executive) =

National Basketball Association executive

Charlotte Hornets
- Position: COO/President/Minority Owner
- League: NBA

Personal information
- Born: 1958 (age 67–68) Greensboro, North Carolina, U.S.

Career information
- College: Campbell University & NCCU Law

Fred Whitfield (born in 1958) is the former chief operating officer, president, vice chairman, alternate governor, and minority owner of the Charlotte Hornets. Whitfield is the only African-American COO in the NBA.

In July 2006, Hornets Sports & Entertainment announced the hire of Whitfield as president and COO.

Michael Jordan said “I’ve known Whitfield for over 35 years, and we have been through a lot together...We worked together when he worked with my agent, at Nike when we launched the Jordan Brand and he worked with me in the front office of the Wizards...I am thankful to have him as the team president and as my friend.”

Whitfield was honored the prestigious Thurgood Marshall Award of Excellence (2011) and YMCA George Williams Award (Volunteer of the Year 2012), the Key to the City of Greensboro (2013), the UNC Charlotte Distinguished Service Award (2019), and named the 2019 Citizen of the Carolinas by the Charlotte Regional Business Alliance.

He is currently a member of the Charlotte Executive Leadership Council, Charlotte Chamber of Commerce board of directors, the Charlotte Sports Foundation board of directors, and his alma mater Campbell University's board of trustees.

Whitfield and his wife Mary reside in Charlotte, North Carolina.

== Early life and career ==
Whitfield was born and raised in Greensboro, North Carolina, by his parents, Fred Sr. And Janol Whitfield.

Whitfield received his BBA in economics in 1980 and MBA from Campbell University. During this time, Whitfield was an All-South team MVP basketball player and assistant basketball coach for the Campbell Fighting Camels. In 1998, Whitfield received his JD degree from North Carolina Central University School of Law, where he acted as president of the Student Bar Association. In 2018, Whitfield was inducted into the NC Sports Hall of Fame.

Whitfield's career experience includes private law practice, the Jordan Brand as director of business and legal affairs, the Washington Wizards as director of player personnel and assistant legal counsel, Nike basketball as director of player development, and Falk Associates Management Enterprises as director of Carolina's Region for player representation.

Whitfield founded Achievements Unlimited Basketball Camp and HoopTee Charities, a North Carolina non-profit committed to giving scholarships for disadvantaged groups to attend camps and educational programs across the country.

== Charlotte Hornets ==
Whitfield played a crucial role in bringing the 2019 NBA All-Star Game, 2019 ACC men's basketball tournament, 2012 Democratic National Convention and 2020 Republican National Convention to Spectrum Center.

Whitfield oversaw the business operations for the $40 million renovations to Spectrum Center.

Whitfield formed long-term partnerships with Ticketmaster to serve as the ticketing provider and Live Nation to book entertainment.

In 2016, Whitfield and the Hornets signed an arena naming rights deal to switch name from Time Warner Cable to Charter's Spectrum. In 2018, Whitfield and the Hornets extended television broadcast rights deal with Fox Sports Southeast for $20 million per year.

In April 2016, Whitfield delivered a commencement address at Shaw University.

During the COVID-19 outbreak, the Spectrum Center was utilized as a vaccination center and as an early voting location for the 2020 election. Whitfield said “we have always looked at the Spectrum Center as a community asset...to us, this was as big or bigger than any...because this is about saving lives and trying to sustain people’s lives.”

== See also ==
- List of National Basketball Association team presidents
