= James Garrison (architect) =

American architect (born 1953)

- Born: James Garrison; 1953 (age 72–73); Ridgway, Pennsylvania, U.S.
- Education: Syracuse University School of Architecture
- Occupations: Architect and educator
- Relatives: Emma Garrison and Brendan Garrison
- Scientific career
- Workplaces: James Stewart Polshek and Associates, NYC,

James Garrison (born 1953) is an American architect and academic educator. He lives and teaches in Brooklyn, New York.

== Early life ==
Garrison grew up in western Pennsylvania, observing surface mining and clear-cutting. Experience that influenced his interest in ecological protection and his understanding of sustainability in architecture. In 1971, Garrison attended the Syracuse University School of Architecture, where he researched new forms of urban housing under the mentorship of Werner Seligman and graduated with design honors. While at Syracuse, he apprenticed with modernists Lewis Skoler and Kermit Lee, who instilled within Garrison a strong and progressive spirit for architecture and society.

== Career ==
Garrison joined James Stewart Polshek and Associates, NYC, in 1978, becoming a partner in the successor firm, the Polshek Partnership, in 1989. He began teaching and conducting research in building design and technology at Columbia University in 1984, where he taught core studios and directed the architectural technology curriculum until 1992. He has taught at the Pratt Institute since 2008, concentrating on core graduate studios and specialized seminar investigations into industrialized building systems and sustainability.

Following the growth of Polshek and Partners in the 1980s, Garrison established Garrison Architects, a studio practice focusing on the integration of art, sustainability, and engineering within architecture. The practice incorporates craftsmanship and digital precision. The firms's designs incorporate prefabrication, climate-specific design, solar-induced ventilation, embodied energy reduction, and net zero programs for energy, waste, and water. Work in prefabrication has focused on volumetric modular structures and includes using industrial design and engineering methods to create sustainable, affordable, and efficient architectural systems.

One of Garrison's early notable buildings was 500 Park Avenue, designed while he was with James Stewart Polshek and Associates. It drew on his academic work, exploring the potential for modern architecture to integrate with the urban city fabric. Located at 59th Street and Park Avenue in Manhattan, it synthesizes the glass architecture of the post-war era with the masonry of surrounding pre-war apartment buildings. Ada Louise Huxtable called it an exemplar of contextual design, and it received an honor award from the American Institute of Architects.

In 2008, Garrison Architects was commissioned to design the Syracuse University School of Architecture for 34 faculty, with a limited budget, in a damaged, early 20th-century building. The design process began with an analysis of how the building could foster identity and communication while increasing the school's visibility within the university. Analysis revealed the building's abandoned solar-actuated ventilation system, which informed the project's design approach. Garrison Architects received a NYC AIA ( American Institute of Architects, New York) design award for this project.

The Pod Hotel, completed in 2018 in Williamsburg, Brooklyn, is one of the firm's largest modular buildings. It incorporates 250 prefabricated modular micro-hotel rooms, restaurants, and commercial spaces within an irregular urban site. The design includes seven interconnected garden courts and four green rooftop terraces with photovoltaic canopies.

Other completed works by Garrison Architects include the U.S. Principal Officers Residence in Samoa, the Irish Repertory Theatre, NYC, NY, the East Elmhurst Branch Library, Queens, NY, Roberto Clemente Plaza, Bronx, NY, the Iversen Kaplan Residence, Princeton, NJ, and Restoration Plaza in Bedford-Stuyvesant, Brooklyn, NY.

Modular structures include the NYC Emergency Housing Prototype for the Office of Emergency Management; the NYC Parks Beach Restoration Modules; mobile drone control and observation modules for Verizon Communications; the Lehman College Child Care Center; and the Milan Case Study Houses.

Projects in production and construction as of Fall 2020 included the Staten Island Animal Shelter, Staten Island, NY; Newark Makerhoods, Newark, NJ; the Piaule Landscape Hotel, Catskill, NY; Lighthouse Point, Staten Island, NY; The 76 Modular Triple Net Zero Housing, Albany, NY; the Aspinwall/ Willich Residence, Hudson, NY; and the Lavrik/Paprocki Residence, Milan, NY.
