= Jerry Richardson =

American football player and executive (1936–2023)

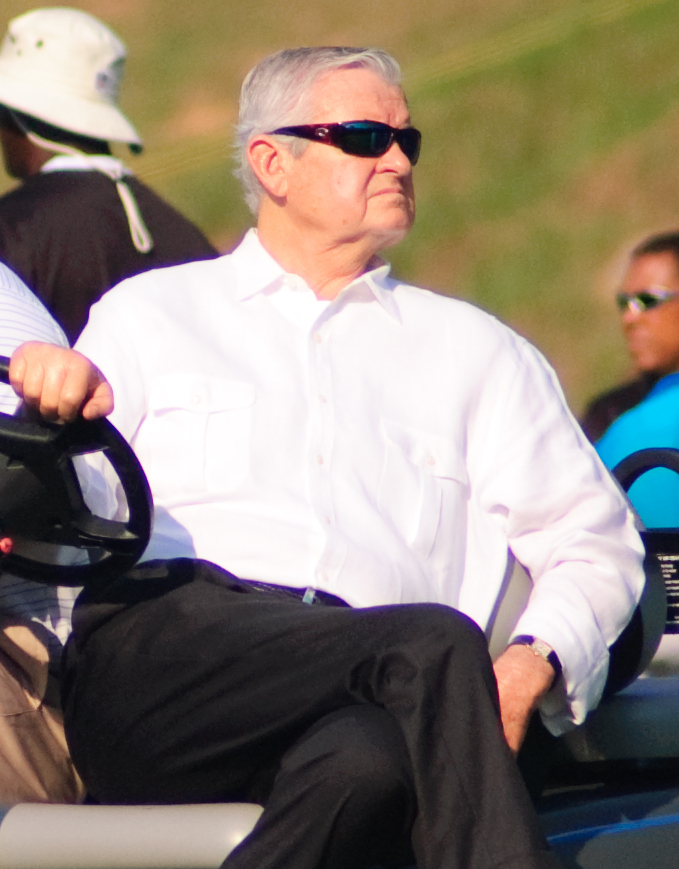
- Richardson in 2009

No. 87
- Position: Flanker

Personal information
- Born: July 18, 1936; Spring Hope, North Carolina, U.S.
- Died: March 1, 2023 (aged 86); Charlotte, North Carolina, U.S.
- Listed height: 6 ft 3 in (1.91 m)
- Listed weight: 185 lb (84 kg)

Career information
- High school: Terry Sanford (Fayetteville, North Carolina)
- College: Wofford (1955–1958)
- NFL draft: 1959: 13th round, 154th overall pick

Career history

Playing
- Baltimore Colts (1959–1960)

Operations
- Carolina Panthers (1995–2017) Owner

Awards and highlights
- As a player: NFL champion (1959); Second-team Little All-American (1958); Third-team Little All-American (1957)

Career NFL statistics
- Receptions: 15
- Receiving yards: 171
- Receiving touchdowns: 4
- Stats at Pro Football Reference
- Executive profile at Pro Football Reference

Jerome Johnson Richardson Sr. (July 18, 1936 – March 1, 2023) was an American businessman, professional football player, and owner in the National Football League (NFL). A native of Spring Hope, North Carolina, he played college football for the Wofford Terriers and was twice a Little All-America selection. After graduating, he played two seasons in the NFL with the Baltimore Colts, catching a touchdown pass from John Unitas in the championship game.

Richardson later became a businessman, operating a Hardee's location, founding Spartan Foods, and the CEO at Flagstar. He founded the Carolina Panthers, and was its owner from its first season in 1995 until selling the franchise in 2018.

== Early life and college ==
Richardson was born in Spring Hope, North Carolina. He went to Wofford College in Spartanburg, South Carolina. Richardson was an Associated Press Little All-American selection in 1957 and 1958. He still holds Wofford's single-game record with 241 receiving yards vs. Newberry in 1956 and is the school's record holder for touchdown receptions in a season (9 in 1958) and in a career (21). As a senior at Wofford, he scored 72 points on nine touchdowns, 12 extra points and two field goals. Richardson called being elected team captain in 1958 the greatest honor he had received. In 1983, he was chosen to Wofford's All-Time Football team as a receiver.

Richardson was active in numerous groups on the Wofford campus; he was a member of Kappa Alpha Order fraternity, President of the Inter-Fraternity Council, and member of the SCA Cabinet. Honors he received while at Wofford included Distinguished Military Student, Scabbard and Blade Military Fraternity, Sigma Delta Psi, Blue Key National Honorary Fraternity, and recognition in Who's Who in American Universities and Colleges.

== Professional football ==
Drafted in the 13th round of the 1958 NFL draft by the defending league champion Baltimore Colts, Richardson played two seasons in the NFL, earning Colt Rookie of the Year honors in 1959.https://www.pro-football-reference.com/players/H/HernDo20.htm He caught a touchdown pass in the 1959 NFL Championship Game from quarterback Johnny Unitas. He was traded from the Colts to the New York Giants for John Guzik on August 3, 1961.

== Business ==
After his NFL career, Richardson used his 1959 NFL championship bonus with the help of friend and former Wofford quarterback Charles Bradshaw to open the first Hardee's franchise in Spartanburg. The two ended up owning the Hardee's business 50/50. The business expanded rapidly under his hands-on management style. From his headquarters in Spartanburg, he co-founded Spartan Foods, which was the first franchisee of Hardee's. He later was the CEO of Flagstar, which was the sixth largest food service company in the United States, controlling 2,500 restaurants and providing jobs for 100,000 employees. He retired in 1995. According to Statistica, he is the wealthiest NFL player of all time.

== Carolina Panthers ==
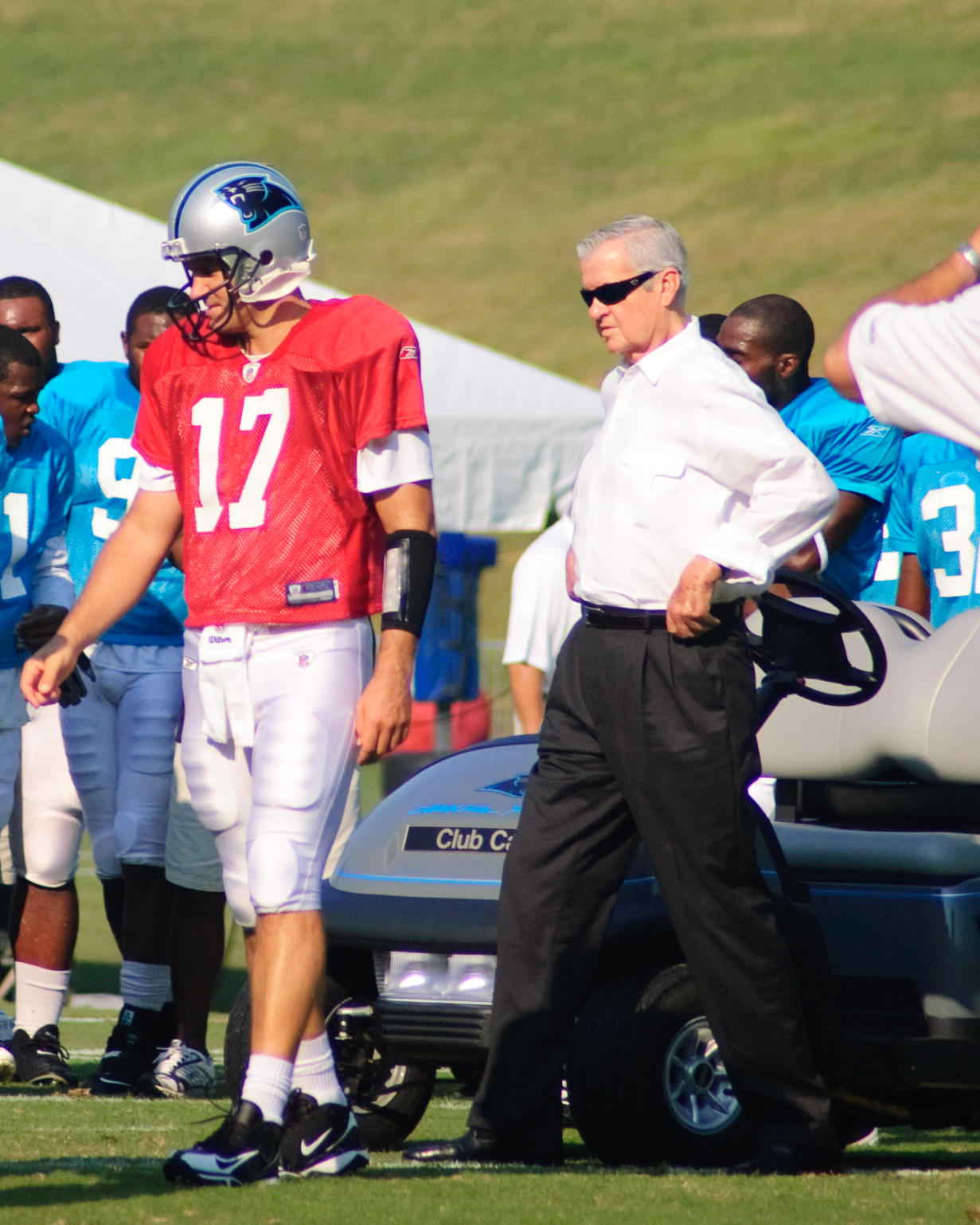
Richardson with Jake Delhomme at the Panthers' training camp at Wofford College in Spartanburg in August 2009

On October 26, 1993, Richardson became the first former NFL player since George Halas to become an owner when the Carolina Panthers were unanimously awarded the NFL's 29th franchise. The Panthers have represented not only Charlotte and North Carolina, but the surrounding region; the area has benefited from the franchise's success.

Richardson was regarded as one of the most powerful NFL owners, alongside Jerry Jones of the Dallas Cowboys and Robert Kraft of the New England Patriots, respectively. Richardson played a role in locking out the NFL players in 2011 and in negotiating a new players agreement.

For the most part Richardson stayed in the background and rarely interfered in the Panthers' day-to-day operations. For instance, when he fired George Seifert after the 2001 season (in which the Panthers went 1–15), he went nine years before holding another press conference at which he took questions from the media—when he announced that John Fox's contract would not be renewed.

One of the few times in which he directly intervened in football matters came in the 2014–15 offseason, when he refused to re-sign player Greg Hardy in the wake of domestic violence events involving Hardy. Richardson said that he made the decision not to do so because "we do the right things."

It had long been presumed that Richardson intended to have his sons, Mark and Jon, inherit the team. Mark was team president of the Panthers, while Jon served as president of Panthers Stadium LLC from its inception in 1994. However both Mark and Jon abruptly resigned before the 2009 season, reportedly at the behest of the senior Richardson, although both Mark and Jon remained minority owners and Jon died of cancer in 2013. On January 16, 2013, WBTV in Charlotte reported that Jerry Richardson wanted the team to be sold after he died, but presumably only to someone who would keep the team and jobs in Charlotte.

In the 2015 season, Richardson's Panthers reached Super Bowl 50 on February 7, 2016, after losing only one game all season. The Panthers fell to the Denver Broncos with a score of 24–10. At the company's expense, the Panthers transported and housed a majority of their employees at the Super Bowl.

As Panthers majority owner, Richardson was said to be a "champion of diversity", with African-American Cam Newton as starting quarterback and Hispanic Ron Rivera as head coach, as well as former Topcats cheerleader Tina Becker as chief operating officer.

=== Controversy and sale ===
On December 17, 2017, Sports Illustrated reported that "at least four former Panthers employees have received 'significant' monetary settlements due to inappropriate workplace comments and conduct by owner Jerry Richardson, including sexually suggestive language and behavior, and on at least one occasion directing a racial slur at an African-American Panthers scout." There has never been an admission or ruling of racial or sexual misbehavior by Richardson or anyone else affiliated with the Panthers.

On the same day, it was announced that Richardson intended to sell the Panthers franchise at the conclusion of the 2017 season. After great interest from the market, in May 2018 Richardson finalized a sale to billionaire and then Pittsburgh Steelers minority owner David Tepper for an NFL record sales price of $2.2 billion. The deal was approved by NFL owners on May 22, 2018. On June 28, 2018, Richardson was fined $2.75 million for the alleged workplace misconduct.

A 13-foot (4.0 m) statue of Richardson holding a football and flanked by two panthers was unveiled at Bank of America Stadium in 2016; it was a gift from the Panthers LLC minority partners to Richardson for his 80th birthday. On June 10, 2020, the statue was removed.

== Personal life ==
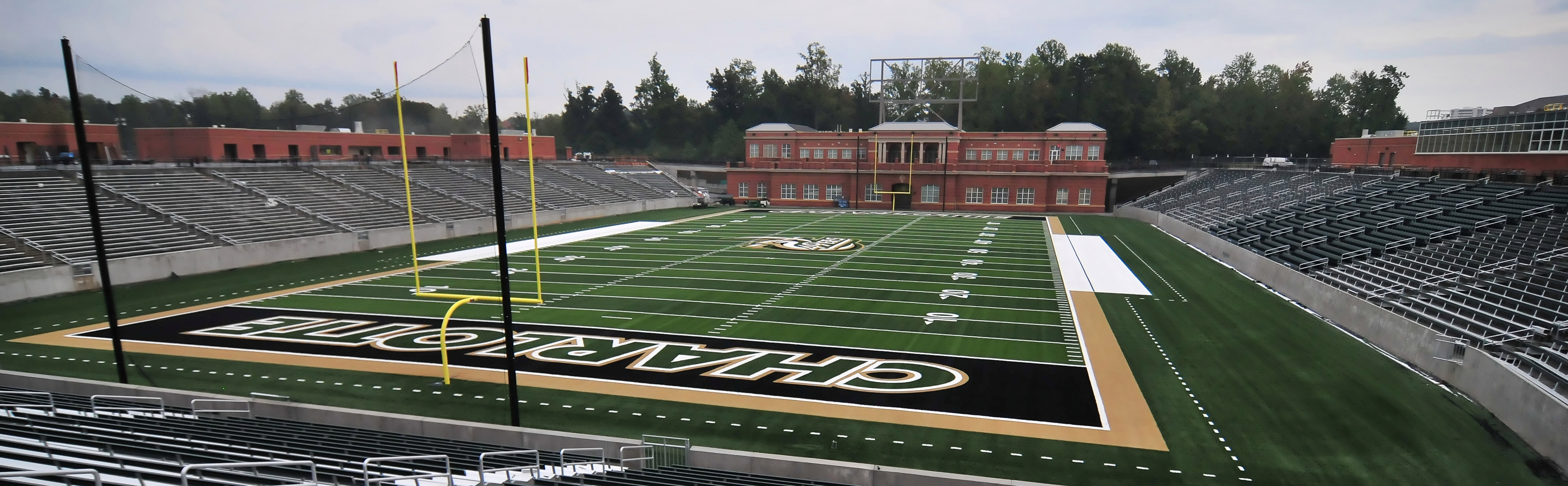
Jerry Richardson Stadium at the University of North Carolina at Charlotte

Richardson was hospitalized in Charlotte at Carolinas Medical Center in early December 2008, one month after receiving a pacemaker. He had a history of heart trouble and had undergone quadruple bypass surgery in 2002. Two days later he was placed on a donor waiting list for a new heart. He received a new heart on February 1, 2009, and fully recovered from the transplant operation.

Richardson and businessman Hugh McColl purchased the naming rights to the University of North Carolina at Charlotte's football field in 2011. The stadium was named Jerry Richardson Stadium in 2013 after an additional $10 million donation.

In 2000, Richardson was elected into the North Carolina Sports Hall of Fame. In 2006 and 2015, he was elected to the South Carolina Business and Sports Halls of Fame, respectively. In 2016 he funded the Rosalind Sallenger Richardson Center for the Arts, in honor of his wife of over sixty years, on the Wofford College campus. In 2017, he funded Wofford's state-of-the-art Jerry Richardson Indoor Stadium.

In 2021, he donated $150 million to Wofford College. It is the largest gift in Wofford's history. The gift is designated for the college's endowment with a focus on need-based financial scholarships and experiences for Wofford students. His gifts to Wofford to date, including capital improvements, exceed $260 million. According to Richardson, Wofford has been the greatest influence in success in his life, with no other influence "even close".

Richardson died at home in Charlotte on March 1, 2023, at age 86.
