= Jim Garrison (American football) =

American football player and coach (1933–2015)

Jim Garrison (March 5, 1933 – April 3, 2015) was an American football coach. He served as the head football coach at Chowan College when it was a junior college.

== Biography ==
Garrison grew up in an orphanage in Weaverville, North Carolina. He attended Gardner–Webb University in 1951 and 1952, and then transferred to Western Carolina University, where he played two seasons (1953 and 1954) for the Catamounts as a halfback. He was an All-North Conference selection, and co-captain of the 1954 team. In 1958, he became head football coach at Chowan College located in Murfreesboro, North Carolina. He built that junior college program into a national power, winning 182 games in the process, seventh all-time among the nation's junior college coaches.

Garrison has been inducted into four halls of fame: the National Junior College Athletics Association, North Carolina Sports, Gardner–Webb, and Chowan. The football stadium at Chowan University was named to honor Garrison's career. During his tenure at Chowan, 35 players were NJCAA All-Americans. Multiple players have had NFL careers including Robert Brown, George Koonce, Jerry Holmes, Mark Royals.
