= 2016 Southeastern Conference football season =

- League: NCAA Division I Football Bowl Subdivision
- Sport: Football
- Duration: September 1, 2016 through January 9, 2017
- Teams: 14
- TV partner(s): ABC, ACCN, ASN, CBS, CBSSN, ESPN, ESPN2, ESPN3, ESPNU, FS1, SECN

2017 NFL Draft
- Top draft pick: Myles Garrett (Texas A&M)
- Picked by: Cleveland Browns, 1st overall

Regular season
- Top scorer: Daniel Carlson (134 points)
- Eastern champions: Florida
- Eastern runners-up: Tennessee, Georgia, Kentucky
- Western champions: Alabama
- Western runners-up: Auburn, LSU

SEC Championship Game
- Champions: Alabama
- Runners-up: Florida

Football seasons
- 2015 2017

2016 Southeastern Conference football standings
| | Conf. | | | Overall |
| Team | W | | L | W | | L |
|---|---|---|---|---|---|---|
Eastern Division
| No. 14 Florida x | 6 | – | 2 | 9 | – | 4 |
| No. 22 Tennessee | 4 | – | 4 | 9 | – | 4 |
| Georgia | 4 | – | 4 | 8 | – | 5 |
| Kentucky | 4 | – | 4 | 7 | – | 6 |
| South Carolina | 3 | – | 5 | 6 | – | 7 |
| Vanderbilt | 3 | – | 5 | 6 | – | 7 |
| Missouri* | 2 | – | 6 | 4 | – | 8 |
Western Division
| No. 2 Alabama x$^ | 8 | – | 0 | 14 | – | 1 |
| No. 24 Auburn | 5 | – | 3 | 8 | – | 5 |
| No. 13 LSU | 5 | – | 3 | 8 | – | 4 |
| Texas A&M | 4 | – | 4 | 8 | – | 5 |
| Arkansas | 3 | – | 5 | 7 | – | 6 |
| Mississippi State | 3 | – | 5 | 6 | – | 7 |
| Ole Miss* | 2 | – | 6 | 5 | – | 7 |
Championship: Alabama 54, Florida 16
^ – College Football Playoff participant; $ – Conference champion; x – Division champion/co-champions; * Ole Miss and Missouri vacated all wins due to NCAA violations.; Rankings from AP Poll

The 2016 Southeastern Conference football season was the 84th season of SEC football and took place during the 2016 NCAA Division I FBS football season. The season began on September 1 with Tennessee defeating Appalachian State on the SEC Network. This is the fifth season for the SEC under realignment that took place in 2012 adding Texas A&M and Missouri from the Big 12 Conference. The SEC is a Power Five conference under the College Football Playoff format along with the Atlantic Coast Conference, the Big 12 Conference, the Big Ten Conference, and the Pac-12 Conference.

The SEC consists of 14 members: Alabama, Arkansas, Auburn, Florida, Georgia, Kentucky, LSU, Mississippi, Mississippi State, Missouri, South Carolina, Tennessee, Texas A&M, and Vanderbilt; and is split up into the Western and Eastern divisions, with the champion of each division meeting in Atlanta to compete for the SEC Championship on December 3. Alabama enters the season as defending SEC champions as they defeated Florida in the previous year's championship game. The Tide would then go on to defeat the Washington Huskies in the Peach Bowl, but lost to Clemson 35–31 on January 9, 2017, in the National Championship Game.

== Preseason ==
=== Recruiting classes ===
National rankings
| Team | ESPN | Rivals | Scout | 24/7 | Total signees |
|---|---|---|---|---|---|
| Alabama | #2 | #1 | #1 | #1 | 25 |
| Arkansas | #24 | #33 | #32 | #25 | 20 |
| Auburn | #9 | #9 | #12 | #9 | 21 |
| Florida | #12 | #14 | #10 | #13 | 25 |
| Georgia | #7 | #10 | #9 | #7 | 20 |
| Kentucky | #35 | #29 | #38 | #34 | 25 |
| LSU | #3 | #5 | #4 | #3 | 23 |
| Ole Miss | #4 | #7 | #5 | #6 | 24 |
| Mississippi State | #33 | #35 | #35 | #31 | 18 |
| Missouri | #51 | #52 | #57 | #53 | 20 |
| South Carolina | #27 | #26 | #26 | #26 | 24 |
| Tennessee | #14 | #15 | #17 | #14 | 21 |
| Texas A&M | #20 | #16 | #21 | #18 | 22 |
| Vanderbilt | #48 | #60 | #68 | #54 | 20 |

=== SEC Media Days ===
The SEC conducted its annual media days at the Hyatt Regency Birmingham – The Wynfrey Hotel in Hoover, Alabama between July 11 and July 14. The event commenced with a speech by commissioner Greg Sankey, and all 14 teams sent their head coaches and three selected players to speak with members of the media. The event along with all speakers and interviews were broadcast live on the SEC Network and streamed live on ESPN.com. On Monday, the teams and representatives in respective order were as follows: Auburn (Gus Malzahn, Carl Lawson, Montravius Adams, Marcus Davis), Florida (Jim McElwain, David Sharpe, Jarrad Davis, Marcus Maye), and Vanderbilt (Derek Mason, Ralph Webb, Zach Cunningham, Oren Burks). On Tuesday: Georgia (Kirby Smart, Jeb Blazevich, Brandon Kublanow, Dominick Sanders), Mississippi State (Dan Mullen, Richie Brown, Fred Ross, A.J. Jefferson), Tennessee (Butch Jones, Joshua Dobbs, Jalen Reeves-Maybin, Cameron Sutton), and Texas A&M (Kevin Sumlin, Myles Garrett, Trevor Knight, Ricky Seals-Jones). On Wednesday: Alabama (Nick Saban, Jonathan Allen, O.J. Howard, Eddie Jackson), Arkansas (Bret Bielema, Brooks Ellis, Deatrich Wise Jr., Jeremy Sprinkle), Kentucky (Mark Stoops, Jojo Kemp, Courtney Love, Jon Toth), and Missouri (Barry Odom, Sean Culkin, Charles Harris, Michael Scherer). On Thursday: South Carolina (Will Muschamp, Deebo Samuel, Marquavius Lewis, Mason Zandi), Ole Miss (Hugh Freeze, Chad Kelly, Evan Engram, D.J. Jones), and LSU (Les Miles, Leonard Fournette, Ethan Pocic, Tre'Davious White).

==== Media Polls ====
The SEC Media Days concluded with its annual preseason media polls. Since 1992, the credentialed media has gotten the preseason champion correct just five times. Only eight times has the preseason pick even made it to the SEC title game. Below are the results of the media poll with total points received next to each school and first-place votes in parentheses.

SEC Champion Voting

- Alabama – 223
- LSU – 59
- Tennessee – 29
- Georgia – 7
- Florida – 5
- Ole Miss – 4
- Texas A&M – 1
- South Carolina – 1
- Arkansas – 1
- Vanderbilt – 1

West Division

1. Alabama – 2,220 (246)
2. LSU – 1,984 (76)
3. Ole Miss – 1,479 (5)
4. Texas A&M – 1,130 (3)
5. Arkansas – 1,047 (1)
6. Auburn – 890
7. Mississippi State – 518

East Division

1. Tennessee – 2,167 (225)
2. Florida – 1,891 (57)
3. Georgia – 1,860 (45)
4. Kentucky – 933
5. Vanderbilt – 810 (2)
6. Missouri – 807
7. South Carolina – 800 (2)

==== Preseason All-SEC: Media ====
First Team Offense
| Position | Player | Class | Team |
|---|---|---|---|
| QB | Chad Kelly | SR | Ole Miss |
| RB | Leonard Fournette | JR | LSU |
| RB | Nick Chubb | JR | Georgia |
| WR | Calvin Ridley | SO | Alabama |
| WR | Christian Kirk | SO | Texas A&M |
| TE | O. J. Howard | SR | Alabama |
| OL | Cam Robinson | JR | Alabama |
| OL | Dan Skipper | SR | Arkansas |
| OL | Greg Pyke | SR | Georgia |
| OL | Alex Kozan | SR | Auburn |
| C | Ethan Pocic | SR | LSU |

First Team Defense
| Position | Player | Class | Team |
|---|---|---|---|
| DL | Jonathan Allen | SR | Alabama |
| DL | Myles Garrett | JR | Texas A&M |
| DL | Carl Lawson | JR | Auburn |
| DL | Derek Barnett | JR | Tennessee |
| LB | Reuben Foster | SR | Alabama |
| LB | Kendell Beckwith | SR | LSU |
| LB | Jalen Reeves-Maybin | SR | Tennessee |
| DB | Eddie Jackson | SR | Alabama |
| DB | Teez Tabor | JR | Florida |
| DB | Tre'Davious White | SR | LSU |
| DB | Cameron Sutton | SR | Tennessee |

First Team Special Teams
| Position | Player | Class | Team |
|---|---|---|---|
| P | J. K. Scott | JR | Alabama |
| K | Daniel Carlson | JR | Auburn |
| RS | Christian Kirk | SO | Texas A&M |
| AP | Christian Kirk | SO | Texas A&M |

(*) Indicates tie

== Head coaches ==
Three SEC teams hired new head coaches for the 2016 season. All three were in the Eastern Division, and all three were replacing coaches who had spent at least 11 seasons at their respective schools. Former Alabama defensive coordinator Kirby Smart was hired to replace long-time coach Mark Richt at Georgia, who left for the same position at Miami. Missouri promoted defensive coordinator Barry Odom to head coach to replace long-time coach Gary Pinkel who resigned at the end of the season. Former Florida head coach Will Muschamp was hired to replace long-time head coach Steve Spurrier at South Carolina, who resigned halfway through the season. Muschamp had spent the previous season as defensive coordinator at Auburn.

After losing to Auburn in dramatic fashion and falling to 2–2 for the first time since 2001, LSU fired head coach Les Miles and offensive coordinator Cam Cameron on September 25, 2016. During his 11+ seasons as head coach, Miles led the Tigers through one of the most successful periods in school history during which they averaged nearly 10 wins per season, won the 2008 BCS Championship and appeared in the 2011 Championship Game, won 2 SEC titles, appeared in the post-season each year with 7 bowl victories, signed 9 top 10 recruiting classes, and had 69 players drafted by the NFL. Defensive line coach Ed Orgeron was named interim head coach for the remainder of the season, and on November 26 after compiling a 5–2 record, Orgeron was named permanent head coach.

Note: All stats shown are before the beginning of the season.

| Team | Head coach | Years at school | Overall record | Record at school | SEC record |
|---|---|---|---|---|---|
| Alabama | Nick Saban | 10 | 191–60–1 | 100–18 | 57–12 |
| Arkansas | Bret Bielema | 4 | 86–44 | 18–20 | 7–17 |
| Auburn | Gus Malzahn | 4 | 36–16 | 27–13 | 13–11 |
| Florida | Jim McElwain | 2 | 32–20 | 10–4 | 7–1 |
| Georgia | Kirby Smart | 1 | 0–0 | 0–0 | 0–0 |
| Kentucky | Mark Stoops | 4 | 12–24 | 12–24 | 4–20 |
| LSU | Les Miles | 12 | 139–53 | 112–32 | 61–27 |
| Ole Miss | Hugh Freeze | 5 | 64–25 | 34–18 | 17–15 |
| Mississippi State | Dan Mullen | 8 | 55–35 | 55–35 | 26–30 |
| Missouri | Barry Odom | 1 | 0–0 | 0–0 | 0–0 |
| South Carolina | Will Muschamp | 1 | 28–21 | 0–0 | 0–0 |
| Tennessee | Butch Jones | 4 | 71–44 | 21–17 | 10–14 |
| Texas A&M | Kevin Sumlin | 5 | 71–33 | 36–16 | 17–15 |
| Vanderbilt | Derek Mason | 3 | 7–17 | 7–17 | 2–14 |

== Rankings ==
Legend
| | Increase in ranking |
| | Decrease in ranking |
| | Not ranked previous week |
| RV | Received votes but were not ranked in Top 25 of poll |

| | | Pre | Wk 1 | Wk 2 | Wk 3 | Wk 4 | Wk 5 | Wk 6 | Wk 7 | Wk 8 | Wk 9 | Wk 10 | Wk 11 | Wk 12 | Wk 13 | Wk 14 | Final |
|---|---|---|---|---|---|---|---|---|---|---|---|---|---|---|---|---|---|
| Alabama | AP | 1 (33) | 1 (54) | 1 (56) | 1 (50) | 1 (50) | 1 (53) | 1 (56) | 1 (60) | 1 (60) | 1 (60) | 1 (60) | 1 (61) | 1 (61) | 1 (61) | 1 (61) | 2 |
| Alabama | C | 1 (55) | 1 (62) | 1 (62) | 1 (59) | 1 (61) | 1 (57) | 1 (58) | 1 (61) | 1 (63) | 1 (63) | 1 (62) | 1 (63) | 1 (63) | 1 (64) | 1 (58) | 2 |
| Alabama | CFP | Not released | | | | | | | | | 1 | 1 | 1 | 1 | 1 | 1 | |
| Arkansas | AP | RV | | 24 | 17 | 20 | 16 | 22 | 17 | RV | RV | RV | RV | RV | | | |
| Arkansas | C | RV | RV | 24 | 18 | 22 | 17 | 22 | 17 | RV | RV | RV | RV | RV | | | RV |
| Arkansas | CFP | Not released | | | | | | | | | | 25 | | | | | |
| Auburn | AP | RV | RV | RV | | RV | RV | 23 | 21 | 15 | 11 | 8 | 18 | 16 | 18 | 17 | 24 |
| Auburn | C | RV | RV | RV | RV | RV | RV | RV | 24 | 17 | 12 | 8 | 16 | 16 | 19 | 17 | 22 |
| Auburn | CFP | Not released | | | | | | | | | 9 | 9 | 15 | 13 | 14 | 14 | |
| Florida | AP | 25 | RV | 23 | 19 | 23 | 18 | 18 | 15 | 14 | 10 | 22 | 21 | 13 | 15 | 20 | 14 |
| Florida | C | 25 | 25 | 23 | 16 | 21 | 18 | 14 | 12 | 12 | 9 | 16 | 18 | 13 | 16 | 18 | 13 |
| Florida | CFP | Not released | | | | | | | | | 11 | | 23 | 15 | 15 | 17 | |
| Georgia | AP | 18 | 9 | 16 | 12 | 25 | RV | RV | | | | | | | | | |
| Georgia | C | 16 | 9 | 13 | 11 | 20 | RV | RV | | | | | | | | | RV |
| Georgia | CFP | Not released | | | | | | | | | | | | | | | |
| Kentucky | AP | RV | | | | | | | | | | | | | | | |
| Kentucky | C | | | | | | | | | | | | | | | RV | |
| Kentucky | CFP | Not released | | | | | | | | | | | | | | | |
| LSU | AP | 5 (1) | 21 | 20 | 18 | RV | RV | RV | 25 | 19 | 15 | 19 | 16 | 25 | 21 | 19 | 13 |
| LSU | C | 6 | 22 | 22 | 17 | RV | RV | 25 | 23 | 19 | 14 | 19 | 14 | RV | 21 | 20 | 14 |
| LSU | CFP | Not released | | | | | | | | | 13 | 24 | 16 | | 21 | 20 | |
| Mississippi State | AP | | | | | | | | | | | | | | | | |
| Mississippi State | C | RV | | | | | | | | | | | | | | | |
| Mississippi State | CFP | Not released | | | | | | | | | | | | | | | |
| Missouri | AP | | | | | | | | | | | | | | | | |
| Missouri | C | | | | | | | | | | | | | | | | |
| Missouri | CFP | Not released | | | | | | | | | | | | | | | |
| Ole Miss | AP | 11 | 19 | 19 | 23 | 16 | 14 | 12 | 23 | | | | RV | | | | |
| Ole Miss | C | 12 | 18 | 17 | 21 | 17 | 14 | 13 | 22 | RV | RV | | | | | | |
| Ole Miss | CFP | Not released | | | | | | | | | | | | | | | |
| South Carolina | AP | | | | | | | | | | | | | | | | |
| South Carolina | C | | | | | | | | | | | | | | | | |
| South Carolina | CFP | Not released | | | | | | | | | | | | | | | |
| Tennessee | AP | 9 | 17 | 15 | 14 | 11 | 9 | 9 | 18 | 18 | RV | RV | RV | 24 | RV | RV | 22 |
| Tennessee | C | 10 (1) | 14 | 15 | 12 | 11 | 9 | 11 | 19 | 18 | RV | RV | RV | 24 | RV | RV | 24 |
| Tennessee | CFP | Not released | | | | | | | | | | | 19 | 17 | 22 | 21 | |
| Texas A&M | AP | RV | 20 | 17 | 10 | 9 | 8 | 6 | 6 | 9 | 7 | 10 | 23 | 22 | RV | RV | |
| Texas A&M | C | RV | 24 | 20 | 13 | 10 | 7 | 6 | 6 | 10 | 7 | 11 | 22 | 22 | RV | RV | |
| Texas A&M | CFP | Not released | | | | | | | | | 4 | 8 | 25 | | | | |
| Vanderbilt | AP | | | | | | | | | | | | | | | | |
| Vanderbilt | C | | | | | | | | | | | | | | | | |
| Vanderbilt | CFP | Not released | | | | | | | | | | | | | | | |

== Regular season ==
Index to colors and formatting
Non-conference matchup; SEC member won
Non-conference matchup; SEC member lost
Conference matchup

All times Eastern time. SEC teams in bold.

Rankings reflect those of the AP poll for that week until week 10 when CFP rankings are used.

=== Week One ===
| Date | Time | Visiting team | Home team | Site | Broadcast | Result | Attendance | Reference |
|---|---|---|---|---|---|---|---|---|
| September 1 | 7:30 p.m. | Appalachian State | #9 **Tennessee** | Neyland Stadium • Knoxville, Tennessee | SECN | **W** 20–13 ^{OT} | 100,074 | |
| September 1 | 8:00 p.m. | **South Carolina** | **Vanderbilt** | Vanderbilt Stadium • Nashville, Tennessee | ESPN | **SCAR** 13–10 | 30,304 | |
| September 3 | 12:00 p.m. | **Missouri** | West Virginia | Mountaineer Field • Morgantown, West Virginia | FS1 | **L** 11–26 | 60,125 | |
| September 3 | 12:00 p.m. | South Alabama | **Mississippi State** | Davis Wade Stadium • Starkville, Mississippi | SECN | **L** 20–21 | 57,075 | |
| September 3 | 3:30 p.m. | #16 UCLA | **Texas A&M** | Kyle Field • College Station, Texas | CBS | **W** 31–24 ^{OT} | 100,443 | |
| September 3 | 3:30 p.m. | #5 **LSU** | Wisconsin | Lambeau Field • Green Bay, Wisconsin | ABC | **L** 14–16 | 77,823 | |
| September 3 | 4:00 p.m. | Louisiana Tech | **Arkansas** | Donald W. Reynolds Razorback Stadium • Fayetteville, Arkansas | SECN | **W** 21–20 | 69,132 | |
| September 3 | 5:30 p.m. | #22 North Carolina | #18 **Georgia** | Georgia Dome • Atlanta | ESPN | **W** 33–24 | 75,405 | |
| September 3 | 7:30 p.m. | Southern Miss | **Kentucky** | Commonwealth Stadium • Lexington, Kentucky | ESPNU | **L** 35–44 | 57,230 | |
| September 3 | 7:30 p.m. | UMass | #25 **Florida** | Ben Hill Griffin Stadium • Gainesville, Florida | SECN | **W** 24–7 | 88,121 | |
| September 3 | 8:00 p.m. | #20 USC | #1 **Alabama** | AT&T Stadium • Arlington, Texas | ABC | **W** 52–6 | 81,359 | |
| September 3 | 9:00 p.m. | #2 Clemson | **Auburn** | Jordan–Hare Stadium • Auburn, Alabama | ESPN | **L** 13–19 | 87,451 | |
| September 5 | 8:00 p.m. | #11 **Ole Miss** | #4 Florida State | Camping World Stadium • Orlando, Florida | ESPN | **L** 34–45 | 63,042 | |

Players of the week:

| Offensive | | Offensive lineman | | Defensive | | Defensive lineman | | Special teams | | Freshman | |
| Player | Team | Player | Team | Player | Team | Player | Team | Player | Team | Player | Team |
|---|---|---|---|---|---|---|---|---|---|---|---|
| Nick Chubb | Georgia | Erik McCoy | Texas A&M | Jonathan Allen | Alabama | Deatrich Wise Jr. | Arkansas | Elliott Fry | South Carolina | Jonah Williams | Alabama |

=== Week Two ===
| Date | Time | Visiting team | Home team | Site | Broadcast | Result | Attendance | Reference |
|---|---|---|---|---|---|---|---|---|
| September 10 | 12:00 p.m. | Nicholls State | #9 **Georgia** | Sanford Stadium • Athens, Georgia | SECN | **W** 26–24 | 92,746 | |
| September 10 | 12:00 p.m. | Prairie View A&M | #20 **Texas A&M** | Kyle Field • College Station, Texas | SECN | **W** 67–0 | 96,412 | |
| September 10 | 3:30 p.m. | WKU | #1 **Alabama** | Bryant–Denny Stadium • Tuscaloosa, Alabama | ESPN2 | **W** 38–10 | 101,821 | |
| September 10 | 3:30 p.m. | **Kentucky** | **Florida** | Ben Hill Griffin Stadium • Gainesville, Florida | CBS | **FLA** 45–7 | 85,821 | |
| September 10 | 4:00 p.m. | Wofford | #19 **Ole Miss** | Vaught–Hemingway Stadium • Oxford, Mississippi | SECN | **W** 38–13 | 64,232 | |
| September 10 | 4:00 p.m. | Middle Tennessee | **Vanderbilt** | Vanderbilt Stadium • Nashville, Tennessee | SECN | **W** 47–24 | 29,627 | |
| September 10 | 7:00 p.m. | **Arkansas** | #15 TCU | Amon G. Carter Stadium • Fort Worth, Texas | ESPN | **W** 41–38 ^{2OT} | 48,091 | |
| September 10 | 7:00 p.m. | **South Carolina** | **Mississippi State** | Davis Wade Stadium • Starkville, Mississippi | ESPN2 | **MISS ST** 27–14 | 57,763 | |
| September 10 | 7:30 p.m. | Jacksonville State | #21 **LSU** | Tiger Stadium • Baton Rouge, Louisiana | ESPNU | **W** 34–13 | 98,389 | |
| September 10 | 7:30 p.m. | Arkansas State | **Auburn** | Jordan–Hare Stadium • Auburn, Alabama | SECN | **W** 51–14 | 86,825 | |
| September 10 | 7:30 p.m. | Eastern Michigan | **Missouri** | Faurot Field • Columbia, Missouri | SECN | **W** 61–21 | 51,192 | |
| September 10 | 8:00 p.m. | Virginia Tech | #17 **Tennessee** | Bristol Motor Speedway • Bristol, Tennessee | ABC | **W** 45–24 | 156,990^{‡} | |

Players of the week:

| Offensive | | Offensive lineman | | Defensive | | Defensive lineman | | Special teams | | Freshman | |
| Player | Team | Player | Team | Player | Team | Player | Team | Player | Team | Player | Team |
|---|---|---|---|---|---|---|---|---|---|---|---|
| Austin Allen | Arkansas | Dan Skipper | Arkansas | Micah Abernathy | Tennessee | A.J. Jefferson | Mississippi State | Daniel Carlson; Tre'Davious White | Auburn; LSU | Johnathon Johnson | Missouri |

=== Week Three ===
| Date | Time | Visiting team | Home team | Site | Broadcast | Result | Attendance | Reference |
|---|---|---|---|---|---|---|---|---|
| September 17 | 12:00 p.m. | Ohio | #15 **Tennessee** | Neyland Stadium • Knoxville, Tennessee | SECN | **W** 28–19 | 101,362 | |
| September 17 | 12:30 p.m. | **Vanderbilt** | Georgia Tech | Bobby Dodd Stadium • Atlanta | ACCN | **L** 7–38 | 41,916 | |
| September 17 | 3:30 p.m. | #1 **Alabama** | #19 **Ole Miss** | Vaught–Hemingway Stadium • Oxford, Mississippi | CBS | **ALA** 48–43 | 66,176 | |
| September 17 | 4:00 p.m. | East Carolina | **South Carolina** | Williams-Brice Stadium • Columbia, South Carolina | SECN | **W** 20–15 | 80,384 | |
| September 17 | 4:00 p.m. | New Mexico State | **Kentucky** | Commonwealth Stadium • Lexington, Kentucky | SECN | **W** 62–42 | 49,669 | |
| September 17 | 7:00 p.m. | **Mississippi State** | #20 **LSU** | Tiger Stadium • Baton Rouge, Louisiana | ESPN2 | **LSU** 23–20 | 99,910 | |
| September 17 | 7:00 p.m. | #17 **Texas A&M** | **Auburn** | Jordan–Hare Stadium • Auburn, Alabama | ESPN | **TAMU** 29–16 | 87,175 | |
| September 17 | 7:30 p.m. | North Texas | #23 **Florida** | Ben Hill Griffin Stadium • Gainesville, Florida | ESPNU | **W** 32–0 | 86,848 | |
| September 17 | 7:30 p.m. | #16 **Georgia** | **Missouri** | Faurot Field • Columbia, Missouri | SECN | **UGA** 28–27 | 57,098 | |
| September 17 | 7:30 p.m. | Texas State | #24 **Arkansas** | Donald W. Reynolds Razorback Stadium • Fayetteville, Arkansas | SECN | **W** 42–3 | 72,114 | |

Players of the week:

| Offensive | | Offensive lineman | | Defensive | | Defensive lineman | | Special teams | | Freshman | |
| Player | Team | Player | Team | Player | Team | Player | Team | Player | Team | Player | Team |
|---|---|---|---|---|---|---|---|---|---|---|---|
| Jalen Hurts | Alabama | Frank Ragnow | Arkansas | Justin Evans | Texas A&M | Arden Key | LSU | Eddie Jackson; Josh Growden | Alabama; LSU | Traveon Williams | Texas A&M |

=== Week Four ===
| Date | Time | Visiting team | Home team | Site | Broadcast | Result | Attendance | Reference |
|---|---|---|---|---|---|---|---|---|
| September 24 | 12:00 p.m. | Kent State | #1 **Alabama** | Bryant–Denny Stadium • Tuscaloosa, Alabama | SECN | **W** 48–0 | 101,821 | |
| September 24 | 12:00 p.m. | #12 **Georgia** | #23 **Ole Miss** | Vaught–Hemingway Stadium • Oxford, Mississippi | ESPN | **MISS** 45–14 | 65,843 | |
| September 24 | 3:30 p.m. | #19 **Florida** | #14 **Tennessee** | Neyland Stadium • Knoxville, Tennessee | CBS | **TENN** 38–28 | 102,455 | |
| September 24 | 3:30 p.m. | **Mississippi State** | UMass | Gillette Stadium • Foxboro, Massachusetts | ASN | **W** 47–35 | 13,074 | |
| September 24 | 4:00 p.m. | Delaware State | **Missouri** | Faurot Field • Columbia, Missouri | SECN | **W** 79–0 | 53,472 | |
| September 24 | 4:30 p.m. | **Vanderbilt** | WKU | Houchens Industries–L. T. Smith Stadium • Bowling Green, Kentucky | CBSSN | **W** 31–30 ^{OT} | 23,674 | |
| September 24 | 6:00 p.m. | #18 **LSU** | **Auburn** | Jordan–Hare Stadium • Auburn, Alabama | ESPN | **AUB** 18–13 | 87,451 | |
| September 24 | 7:30 p.m. | **South Carolina** | **Kentucky** | Commonwealth Stadium • Lexington, Kentucky | SECN | **UK** 17–10 | 51,702 | |
| September 24 | 9:00 p.m. | #17 **Arkansas** | #10 **Texas A&M** | AT&T Stadium • Arlington, Texas | ESPN | **TAMU** 45–24 | 67,751 | |

Players of the week:

| Offensive | | Offensive lineman | | Defensive | | Defensive lineman | | Special teams | | Freshman | |
| Player | Team | Player | Team | Player | Team | Player | Team | Player | Team | Player | Team |
|---|---|---|---|---|---|---|---|---|---|---|---|
| Joshua Dobbs | Tennessee | Jordan Sims | Ole Miss | Armani Watts | Texas A&M | Derek Barnett; Denzil Ware | Tennessee; Kentucky | Daniel Carlson | Auburn | Trayveon Williams | Texas A&M |

=== Week Five ===
| Date | Time | Visiting team | Home team | Site | Broadcast | Result | Attendance | Reference |
|---|---|---|---|---|---|---|---|---|
| October 1 | 12:00 p.m. | #23 **Florida** | **Vanderbilt** | Vanderbilt Stadium • Nashville, Tennessee | SECN | **FLA** 13–6 | 30,565 | |
| October 1 | 12:00 p.m. | Alcorn State | #20 **Arkansas** | War Memorial Stadium • Little Rock, Arkansas | SECN | **W** 52–10 | 46,988 | |
| October 1 | 3:30 p.m. | #11 **Tennessee** | #25 **Georgia** | Sanford Stadium • Athens, Georgia | CBS | **TENN** 34–31 | 92,746 | |
| October 1 | 3:30 p.m. | Louisiana–Monroe | **Auburn** | Jordan–Hare Stadium • Auburn, Alabama | SECN | **W** 58–7 | 84,243 | |
| October 1 | 4:00 p.m. | #9 **Texas A&M** | **South Carolina** | Williams-Brice Stadium • Columbia, South Carolina | SECN | **TAMU** 24–13 | 78,245 | |
| October 1 | 7:00 p.m. | **Kentucky** | #1 **Alabama** | Bryant–Denny Stadium • Tuscaloosa, Alabama | ESPN | **ALA** 34–6 | 101,821 | |
| October 1 | 7:00 p.m. | Memphis | #16 **Ole Miss** | Vaught–Hemingway Stadium • Oxford, Mississippi | ESPN2 | **W** 48–28 | 65,889 | |
| October 1 | 7:30 p.m. | **Missouri** | **LSU** | Tiger Stadium • Baton Rouge, Louisiana | SECN | **LSU** 42–7 | 102,071 | |

Players of the week:

| Offensive | | Offensive lineman | | Defensive | | Defensive lineman | | Special teams | | Freshman | |
| Player | Team | Player | Team | Player | Team | Player | Team | Player | Team | Player | Team |
|---|---|---|---|---|---|---|---|---|---|---|---|
| Derrius Guice | LSU | Dan Skipper | Arkansas | Derek Barnett | Tennessee | Daeshon Hall | Texas A&M | Dan Skipper; Riley Lovingood | Arkansas; Tennessee | Josh Jacobs | Alabama |

=== Week Six ===
| Date | Time | Visiting team | Home team | Site | Broadcast | Result | Attendance | Reference |
|---|---|---|---|---|---|---|---|---|
| October 8 | 12:00 p.m. | **Auburn** | **Mississippi State** | Davis Wade Stadium • Starkville, Mississippi | ESPN | **AUB** 38–14 | 60,102 | |
| October 8 | 3:30 p.m. | #9 **Tennessee** | #8 **Texas A&M** | Kyle Field • College Station, Texas | CBS | **TAMU** 45–38 ^{2OT} | 106,248 | |
| October 8 | 4:00 p.m. | **Vanderbilt** | **Kentucky** | Commonwealth Stadium • Lexington, Kentucky | SECN | **UK** 20–13 | 55,030 | |
| October 8 | 7:00 p.m. | #1 **Alabama** | #16 **Arkansas** | Razorback Stadium • Fayetteville, Arkansas | ESPN | **ALA** 49–30 | 75,459 | |
| October 9 | 2:30 p.m.^{[a]} | **Georgia** | **South Carolina** | Williams-Brice Stadium • Columbia, South Carolina | SECN | **UGA** 28–14 | 77,221 | |

^{^[a]}The game between Georgia and South Carolina was rescheduled due to Hurricane Matthew; game originally scheduled for October 8 at 7:30 p.m. on the SEC Network.

Players of the week:

| Offensive | | Offensive lineman | | Defensive | | Defensive lineman | | Special teams | | Freshman | |
| Player | Team | Player | Team | Player | Team | Player | Team | Player | Team | Player | Team |
|---|---|---|---|---|---|---|---|---|---|---|---|
| Trevor Knight | Texas A&M | Jon Toth | Kentucky | Minkah Fitzpatrick | Alabama | Carl Lawson | Auburn | J. K. Scott | Alabama | Jalen Hurts; Traveon Williams | Alabama; Texas A&M |

=== Week Seven ===
| Date | Time | Visiting team | Home team | Site | Broadcast | Result | Attendance | Reference |
|---|---|---|---|---|---|---|---|---|
| October 14 | 9:15 p.m. | **Mississippi State** | BYU | LaVell Edwards Stadium • Provo, Utah | ESPN | **L** 21–28 ^{2OT} | 62,184 | |
| October 15 | 12:00 p.m. | **Vanderbilt** | **Georgia** | Sanford Stadium • Athens, Georgia | SECN | **VANDY** 17–16 | 92,746 | |
| October 15 | 3:30 p.m. | #1 **Alabama** | #9 **Tennessee** | Neyland Stadium • Knoxville, Tennessee | CBS | **ALA** 49–10 | 102,455 | |
| October 15 | 4:00 p.m. | **Missouri** | #18 **Florida** | Ben Hill Griffin Stadium • Gainesville, Florida | SECN | **FLA** 40–14 | 88,825 | |
| October 15 | 7:00 p.m. | #12 **Ole Miss** | #22 **Arkansas** | Razorback Stadium • Fayetteville, Arkansas | ESPN | **ARK** 34–30 | 73,786 | |
| October 15 | 7:30 p.m. | Southern Miss | **LSU** | Tiger Stadium • Baton Rouge, Louisiana | SECN | **W** 45–10 | 102,164 | |

Players of the week:

| Offensive | | Offensive lineman | | Defensive | | Defensive lineman | | Special teams | | Freshman | |
| Player | Team | Player | Team | Player | Team | Player | Team | Player | Team | Player | Team |
|---|---|---|---|---|---|---|---|---|---|---|---|
| Rawleigh Williams III | Arkansas | Jonah Williams | Alabama | Zach Cunningham | Vanderbilt | Derek Barnett | Tennessee | Darrius Sims | Vanderbilt | Jalen Hurts | Alabama |

=== Week Eight ===
| Date | Time | Visiting team | Home team | Site | Broadcast | Result | Attendance | Reference |
|---|---|---|---|---|---|---|---|---|
| October 22 | 12:00 p.m. | UMass | **South Carolina** | Williams-Brice Stadium • Columbia, South Carolina | SECN | **W** 34–28 | 73,428 | |
| October 22 | 3:30 p.m. | #6 **Texas A&M** | #1 **Alabama** | Bryant–Denny Stadium • Tuscaloosa, Alabama | CBS | **ALA** 33–14 | 101,821 | |
| October 22 | 4:00 p.m. | Middle Tennessee | **Missouri** | Faurot Field • Columbia, Missouri | SECN | **L** 45–51 | 52,351 | |
| October 22 | 6:00 p.m. | #17 **Arkansas** | #21 **Auburn** | Jordan–Hare Stadium • Auburn, Alabama | ESPN | **AUB** 56–3 | 87,451 | |
| October 22 | 7:30 p.m. | **Mississippi State** | **Kentucky** | Commonwealth Stadium • Lexington, Kentucky | SECN | **UK** 40–38 | 50,414 | |
| October 22 | 7:30 p.m. | Tennessee State | **Vanderbilt** | Vanderbilt Stadium • Nashville, Tennessee | ESPNU | **W** 35–17 | 31,084 | |
| October 22 | 9:00 p.m. | #23 **Ole Miss** | #25 **LSU** | Tiger Stadium • Baton Rouge, Louisiana | ESPN | **LSU** 38–21 | 101,720 | |

Players of the week:

| Offensive | | Offensive lineman | | Defensive | | Defensive lineman | | Special teams | | Freshman | |
| Player | Team | Player | Team | Player | Team | Player | Team | Player | Team | Player | Team |
|---|---|---|---|---|---|---|---|---|---|---|---|
| Leonard Fournette | LSU | Alex Kozan; Ethan Pocic | Auburn; LSU | Jonathan Allen | Alabama | Montravius Adams | Auburn | Austin MacGinnis | Kentucky | Benny Snell, Jr. | Kentucky |

=== Week Nine ===
| Date | Time | Visiting team | Home team | Site | Broadcast | Result | Attendance | Reference |
|---|---|---|---|---|---|---|---|---|
| October 29 | 12:00 p.m. | **Kentucky** | **Missouri** | Faurot Field • Columbia, Missouri | SECN | **UK** 35–21 | 50,234 | |
| October 29 | 3:30 p.m. | #14 **Florida** | **Georgia** | EverBank Field • Jacksonville, Florida | CBS | **FLA** 24–10 | 84,681 | |
| October 29 | 3:30 p.m. | Samford | **Mississippi State** | Davis Wade Stadium • Starkville, Mississippi | SECN | **W** 56–41 | 58,019 | |
| October 29 | 7:15 p.m. | #15 **Auburn** | **Ole Miss** | Vaught–Hemingway Stadium • Oxford, Mississippi | SECN | **AUB** 40–29 | 65,927 | |
| October 29 | 7:15 p.m. | #18 **Tennessee** | **South Carolina** | Williams-Brice Stadium • Columbia, South Carolina | ESPN2 | **SCAR** 24–21 | 78,696 | |
| October 29 | 7:30 p.m. | New Mexico State | #9 **Texas A&M** | Kyle Field • College Station, Texas | ESPNU | **W** 52–10 | 99,960 | |

Players of the week:

| Offensive | | Offensive lineman | | Defensive | | Defensive lineman | | Special teams | | Freshman | |
| Player | Team | Player | Team | Player | Team | Player | Team | Player | Team | Player | Team |
|---|---|---|---|---|---|---|---|---|---|---|---|
| Kamryn Pettway | Auburn | Martez Ivey | Florida | Jamarcus King | South Carolina | Adrian Middleton | Kentucky | Daniel Carlson | Auburn | Benny Snell, Jr. | Kentucky |

=== Week Ten ===
| Date | Time | Visiting team | Home team | Site | Broadcast | Result | Attendance | Reference |
|---|---|---|---|---|---|---|---|---|
| November 5 | 12:00 p.m. | **Vanderbilt** | #9 **Auburn** | Jordan–Hare Stadium • Auburn, Alabama | ESPN | **AUB** 23–16 | 87,451 | |
| November 5 | 12:00 p.m. | #4 **Texas A&M** | **Mississippi State** | Davis Wade Stadium • Starkville, Mississippi | SECN | **MISS ST** 35–28 | 58,407 | |
| November 5 | 12:00 p.m. | Georgia Southern | **Ole Miss** | Vaught–Hemingway Stadium • Oxford, Mississippi | ESPNU | **W** 37–27 | 60,263 | |
| November 5 | 3:30 p.m. | #11 **Florida** | **Arkansas** | Donald W. Reynolds Razorback Stadium • Fayetteville, Arkansas | CBS | **ARK** 31–10 | 74,432 | |
| November 5 | 4:00 p.m. | **Missouri** | **South Carolina** | Williams-Brice Stadium • Columbia, South Carolina | SECN | **SCAR** 31–21 | 73,817 | |
| November 5 | 4:00 p.m. | Tennessee Tech | **Tennessee** | Neyland Stadium • Knoxville, Tennessee | SECN | **W** 55–0 | 98,343 | |
| November 5 | 7:30 p.m. | **Georgia** | **Kentucky** | Commonwealth Stadium • Lexington, Kentucky | SECN | **UGA** 27–24 | 62,507 | |
| November 5 | 8:00 p.m. | #1 **Alabama** | #13 **LSU** | Tiger Stadium • Baton Rouge, Louisiana | CBS | **ALA** 10–0 | 102,321 | |

Players of the week:

| Offensive | | Offensive lineman | | Defensive | | Defensive lineman | | Special teams | | Freshman | |
| Player | Team | Player | Team | Player | Team | Player | Team | Player | Team | Player | Team |
|---|---|---|---|---|---|---|---|---|---|---|---|
| Nick Fitzgerald; Rawleigh Williams III | Mississippi State; Arkansas | Martinas Rankin | Mississippi State | Ryan Anderson | Alabama | Lewis Neal | LSU | J. K. Scott; Rodrigo Blankenship | Alabama; Georgia | Jake Bentley | South Carolina |

=== Week Eleven ===
| Date | Time | Visiting team | Home team | Site | Broadcast | Result | Attendance | Reference |
|---|---|---|---|---|---|---|---|---|
| November 12 | 12:00 p.m. | **South Carolina** | **Florida** | Ben Hill Griffin Stadium • Gainesville, Florida | CBS | **FLA** 20–7 | 89,614 | |
| November 12 | 12:00 p.m. | **Mississippi State** | #1 **Alabama** | Bryant–Denny Stadium • Tuscaloosa, Alabama | ESPN | **ALA** 51–3 | 101,821 | |
| November 12 | 12:00 p.m. | **Kentucky** | **Tennessee** | Neyland Stadium • Knoxville, Tennessee | SECN | **TENN** 49–36 | 101,075 | |
| November 12 | 3:30 p.m. | #9 **Auburn** | **Georgia** | Sanford Stadium • Athens, Georgia | CBS | **UGA** 13–7 | 92,746 | |
| November 12 | 3:30 p.m. | **Vanderbilt** | **Missouri** | Faurot Field • Columbia, Missouri | SECN | **MIZZOU** 26–17 | 50,261 | |
| November 12 | 7:00 p.m. | #24 **LSU** | #25 **Arkansas** | War Memorial Stadium • Little Rock, Arkansas | ESPN | **LSU** 38–10 | 75,156 | |
| November 12 | 7:30 p.m. | **Ole Miss** | #8 **Texas A&M** | Kyle Field • College Station, Texas | SECN | **MISS** 29–28 | 104,892 | |

Players of the week:

| Offensive | | Offensive lineman | | Defensive | | Defensive lineman | | Special teams | | Freshman | |
| Player | Team | Player | Team | Player | Team | Player | Team | Player | Team | Player | Team |
|---|---|---|---|---|---|---|---|---|---|---|---|
| Jalen Hurts | Alabama | Martez Ivey; Ethan Pocic | Florida; LSU | Maurice Smith | Georgia | Charles Harris | Missouri | Gary Wunderlich | Ole Miss | Shea Patterson | Ole Miss |

=== Week Twelve ===
| Date | Time | Visiting team | Home team | Site | Broadcast | Result | Attendance | Reference |
|---|---|---|---|---|---|---|---|---|
| November 19 | 12:00 p.m. | Louisiana–Lafayette | **Georgia** | Sanford Stadium • Athens, Georgia | SECN | **W** 35–21 | 92,746 | |
| November 19 | 12:00 p.m. | UTSA | #25 **Texas A&M** | Kyle Field • College Station, Texas | ESPNU | **W** 23–10 | 102,502 | |
| November 19^{[b]} | 1:00 p.m. | #23 **Florida** | #16 **LSU** | Tiger Stadium • Baton Rouge, Louisiana | SECN | **FLA** 16–10 | 102,043 | |
| November 19 | 3:30 p.m. | **Missouri** | #19 **Tennessee** | Neyland Stadium • Knoxville, Tennessee | CBS | **TENN** 63–37 | 101,012 | |
| November 19 | 4:00 p.m. | Western Carolina | **South Carolina** | Williams-Brice Stadium • Columbia, South Carolina | SECN | **W** 44–31 | 76,650 | |
| November 19 | 4:30 p.m. | Austin Peay | **Kentucky** | Commonwealth Stadium • Lexington, Kentucky | SECN | **W** 49–13 | 48,948 | |
| November 19 | 7:00 p.m. | Chattanooga | #1 **Alabama** | Bryant–Denny Stadium • Tuscaloosa, Alabama | ESPN2 | **W** 31–3 | 101,821 | |
| November 19 | 7:00 p.m. | **Arkansas** | **Mississippi State** | Davis Wade Stadium • Starkville, Mississippi | ESPNU | **ARK** 58–42 | 58,538 | |
| November 19 | 7:30 p.m. | Alabama A&M | #15 **Auburn** | Jordan–Hare Stadium • Auburn, Alabama | SECN | **W** 55–0 | 87,451 | |
| November 19 | 8:00 p.m. | **Ole Miss** | **Vanderbilt** | Vanderbilt Stadium • Nashville, Tennessee | SECN | **VANDY** 38–17 | 27,763 | |

^{^[b]}The game between LSU and Florida was rescheduled from October 8 and moved from Ben Hill Griffin Stadium to Tiger Stadium due to Hurricane Matthew. The two school's athletic departments agreed to buy out their respective Week 12 non-conference opponents (South Alabama, and Presbyterian) to schedule this game. As a result of playing the game in Baton Rouge, the two schools agreed to play the next two games of the series in Gainesville.

Players of the week:

| Offensive | | Offensive lineman | | Defensive | | Defensive lineman | | Special teams | | Freshman | |
| Player | Team | Player | Team | Player | Team | Player | Team | Player | Team | Player | Team |
|---|---|---|---|---|---|---|---|---|---|---|---|
| Rawleigh Williams lll | Arkansas | Will Holden; Dan Skipper | Vanderbilt; Arkansas | David Reese | Florida | Derek Barnett | Tennessee | Eddy Piñeiro | Florida | Tyrie Cleveland | Florida |

=== Week Thirteen ===
| Date | Time | Visiting team | Home team | Site | Broadcast | Result | Attendance | Reference |
|---|---|---|---|---|---|---|---|---|
| November 24 | 7:30 p.m. | **LSU** | **Texas A&M** | Kyle Field • College Station, Texas | ESPN | **LSU** 54–39 | 102,961 | |
| November 25 | 2:30 p.m. | **Arkansas** | **Missouri** | Faurot Field • Columbia, Missouri | CBS | **MIZZOU** 28–24 | 51,043 | |
| November 26 | 12:00 p.m. | Georgia Tech | **Georgia** | Sanford Stadium • Athens, Georgia | SECN | **L** 27–28 | 92,746 | |
| November 26 | 12:00 p.m. | **Kentucky** | #11 Louisville | Papa John's Cardinal Stadium • Louisville, Kentucky | ESPN | **W** 41–38 | 54,075 | |
| November 26 | 3:30 p.m. | #13 **Auburn** | #1 **Alabama** | Bryant–Denny Stadium • Tuscaloosa, Alabama | CBS | **ALA** 30–12 | 101,821 | |
| November 26 | 3:30 p.m. | **Mississippi State** | **Ole Miss** | Vaught–Hemingway Stadium • Oxford, Mississippi | SECN | **MISS ST** 55–20 | 66,038 | |
| November 26 | 7:30 p.m. | **South Carolina** | #4 Clemson | Memorial Stadium • Clemson, South Carolina | ESPN | **L** 7–56 | 81,542 | |
| November 26 | 7:30 p.m. | #17 **Tennessee** | **Vanderbilt** | Vanderbilt Stadium • Nashville, Tennessee | SECN | **VANDY** 45–34 | 38,108 | |
| November 26 | 8:00 p.m. | #15 **Florida** | #14 Florida State | Doak Campbell Stadium • Tallahassee, Florida | ABC | **L** 13–31 | 78,342 | |

Players of the week:

| Offensive | | Offensive lineman | | Defensive | | Defensive lineman | | Special teams | | Freshman | |
| Player | Team | Player | Team | Player | Team | Player | Team | Player | Team | Player | Team |
|---|---|---|---|---|---|---|---|---|---|---|---|
| Derrius Guice; Nick Fitzgerald | LSU; Mississippi State | Cam Robinson | Alabama | Mike Edwards; Zach Cunningham | Kentucky; Vanderbilt | Marcell Frazier | Missouri | Austin MacGinnis | Kentucky | Leo Lewis | Mississippi State |

=== SEC Championship Game ===
| Date | Time | Visiting team | Home team | Site | Broadcast | Result | Attendance | Reference |
|---|---|---|---|---|---|---|---|---|
| December 3 | 4:00 p.m. | #1 **Alabama** | #15 **Florida** | Georgia Dome • Atlanta (2016 SEC Championship Game) | CBS | **ALA** 54–16 | 74,632 | |

== SEC vs other Conferences ==
=== SEC vs Power Conference matchups ===
This is a list of the power conference teams (ACC, Big Ten, Big 12, Pac-12)^{A} the SEC plays in non-conference (Rankings from the AP Poll):

| Date | Visitor | Home | Site | Significance | Score |
|---|---|---|---|---|---|
| September 3 | #20 USC | #1 Alabama | AT&T Stadium • Arlington, Texas | Advocare Classic | W 52–6 |
| September 3 | #2 Clemson | Auburn | Jordan–Hare Stadium • Auburn, Alabama | Auburn–Clemson football rivalry | L 13–19 |
| September 3 | #22 North Carolina | #18 Georgia | Georgia Dome • Atlanta | Chick-fil-A Kickoff Game | W 33–24 |
| September 3 | #5 LSU | Wisconsin | Lambeau Field • Green Bay, Wisconsin | Lambeau Field College Classic | L 14–16 |
| September 3 | Missouri | West Virginia | Mountaineer Field • Morgantown, West Virginia | | L 11–26 |
| September 3 | #16 UCLA | Texas A&M | Kyle Field • College Station, Texas | | W 31–24 ^{OT} |
| September 5 | #11 Ole Miss | #4 Florida State | Camping World Stadium • Orlando, Florida | Camping World Kickoff | L 34–45 |
| September 10 | Arkansas | #15 TCU | Amon G. Carter Stadium • Fort Worth, Texas | | W 41–38 ^{2OT} |
| September 10 | Virginia Tech | #17 Tennessee | Bristol Motor Speedway • Bristol, Tennessee | Battle at Bristol | W 45–24 |
| September 17 | Vanderbilt | Georgia Tech | Bobby Dodd Stadium • Atlanta | Georgia Tech–Vanderbilt football rivalry | L 7–38 |
| October 14 | Mississippi State | BYU | LaVell Edwards Stadium • Provo, Utah | | L 21–28 ^{2OT} |
| November 26 | #13 Florida | #15 Florida State | Doak Campbell Stadium • Tallahassee, Florida | Florida–Florida State football rivalry | L 13–31 |
| November 26 | Georgia Tech | Georgia | Sanford Stadium • Athens, Georgia | Clean, Old-Fashioned Hate | L 27–28 |
| November 26 | Kentucky | #11 Louisville | Papa John's Cardinal Stadium • Louisville, Kentucky | Governor's Cup | W 41–38 |
| November 26 | South Carolina | #4 Clemson | Memorial Stadium • Clemson, South Carolina | Battle of the Palmetto State | L 7–56 |

^A The SEC recognizes independents Army, BYU and Notre Dame as power five teams for scheduling purposes.

=== Records against non-conference opponents ===
Regular Season

| Power 5 Conferences | Record |
|---|---|
| ACC | 3–6 |
| Big Ten | 0–1 |
| Big 12 | 1–1 |
| Independents (BYU) | 0–1 |
| Pac-12 | 2–0 |
| Power 5 Total | 6–9 |
| Other FBS Conferences | Record |
| American | 2–0 |
| C-USA | 7–2 |
| Independents (UMass) | 3–0 |
| MAC | 3–0 |
| Sun Belt | 8–1 |
| Other FBS Total | 23–3 |
| FCS Opponents | Record |
| Football Championship Subdivision | 13–0 |
| Total Non-Conference Record | 42–12 |

Post Season

| Power 5 Conferences | Record |
|---|---|
| ACC | 1–4 |
| Big Ten | 2–0 |
| Big 12 | 1–2 |
| Pac-12 | 1–0 |
| Power 5 Total | 5–6 |
| Other FBS Conferences | Record |
| American | 0–1 |
| MAC | 1–0 |
| Other FBS Total | 1–1 |
| Total Bowl Record | 6–7 |

== Bowl games ==
(Rankings from final CFP Poll; All times Eastern)

| Date | Time | Bowl Game | Site | TV | SEC Team | Opponent | Result |
|---|---|---|---|---|---|---|---|
| January 9, 2017 | 8:30 p.m. | CFP National Championship | Raymond James Stadium • Tampa, Florida (rivalry) | ESPN | #1 Alabama | #2 Clemson | L 31–35 |
| January 2, 2017 | 8:30 p.m. | Sugar Bowl (New Year's Six) | Mercedes-Benz Superdome • New Orleans | ESPN | #14 Auburn | #7 Oklahoma | L 19–35 |
| January 2, 2017 | 1:00 p.m. | Outback Bowl | Raymond James Stadium • Tampa, Florida | ABC | #17 Florida | Iowa | W 30–3 |
| December 31, 2016 | 3:00 p.m. | Peach Bowl (CFP Seminfinal) | Georgia Dome • Atlanta | ESPN | #1 Alabama | #4 Washington | W 24–7 |
| December 31, 2016 | 11:00 a.m. | TaxSlayer Bowl | EverBank Field • Jacksonville, Florida | ESPN | Kentucky | Georgia Tech | L 18–33 |
| December 31, 2016 | 11:00 a.m. | Citrus Bowl | Citrus Bowl • Orlando, Florida | ABC | #20 LSU | #13 Louisville | W 29–9 |
| December 30, 2016 | 3:30 p.m. | Music City Bowl | Nissan Stadium • Nashville, Tennessee | ESPN | #21 Tennessee | Nebraska | W 38–24 |
| December 30, 2016 | 12:00 p.m. | Liberty Bowl | Liberty Bowl • Memphis, Tennessee | ESPN | Georgia | TCU | W 31–23 |
| December 29, 2016 | 5:30 p.m. | Belk Bowl | Bank of America Stadium • Charlotte, North Carolina | ESPN | Arkansas | #22 Virginia Tech | L 24–35 |
| December 29, 2016 | 2:00 p.m. | Birmingham Bowl | Legion Field • Birmingham, Alabama | ESPN | South Carolina | South Florida | L 39–46 |
| December 28, 2016 | 9:00 p.m. | Texas Bowl | NRG Stadium • Houston, Texas | ESPN | Texas A&M | Kansas State | L 28–33 |
| December 26, 2016 | 5:00 p.m. | Independence Bowl | Independence Stadium • Shreveport, Louisiana | ESPN2 | Vanderbilt | NC State | L 17–41 |
| December 26, 2016 | 11:00 a.m. | St. Petersburg Bowl | Tropicana Field • St. Petersburg, Florida | ESPN | Mississippi State | Miami (OH) | W 17–16 |

== Awards and honors ==
=== SEC Football Awards ===
- Offensive Player of the Year: Jalen Hurts, Alabama
- Defensive Player of the Year: Jonathan Allen, Alabama
- Special Teams Player of the Year: Daniel Carlson, Auburn
- Freshman Player of the Year: Jalen Hurts, Alabama
- Scholar–Athlete of the Year: Brooks Ellis, Arkansas
- Jacobs Blocking Trophy: Cam Robinson, Alabama
- Coach of the Year: Nick Saban, Alabama

=== All-SEC Teams ===
Coaches were not permitted to vote for their own players.

| Position | 1st Team | | 2nd Team | |
| Position | Player | School | Player | School |
|---|---|---|---|---|
| QB | Jalen Hurts | Alabama | Joshua Dobbs*; Chad Kelly* | Tennessee; Ole Miss |
| RB | Kamryn Pettway | Auburn | Rawleigh Williams III | Arkansas |
| RB | Derrius Guice | LSU | Ralph Webb*; Leonard Fournette* | Vanderbilt; LSU |
| WR | Christian Kirk | Texas A&M | Calvin Ridley | Alabama |
| WR | ArDarius Stewart | Alabama | Fred Ross | Mississippi State |
| TE | Evan Engram | Ole Miss | O. J. Howard | Alabama |
| C | Ethan Pocic | LSU | John Toth | Kentucky |
| OG | Avery Gennesy | Texas A&M | Martez Ivey | Florida |
| OG | Will Clapp | LSU | Alex Kozan | Auburn |
| OT | Cam Robinson | Alabama | Braden Smith | Auburn |
| OT | Dan Skipper | Arkansas | Will Holden | Vanderbilt |
| AP | Christian Kirk | Texas A&M | Derrius Guice | LSU |
| DL | Myles Garrett | Texas A&M | Arden Key | LSU |
| DL | Jonathan Allen | Alabama | Montravius Adams | Auburn |
| DL | Carl Lawson | Auburn | Charles Harris | Missouri |
| DL | Derek Barnett | Tennessee | Caleb Brantley | Florida |
| LB | Kendell Beckwith | LSU | Tim Williams | Alabama |
| LB | Zach Cunningham | Vanderbilt | Jarrad Davis | Florida |
| LB | Reuben Foster | Alabama | Jordan Jones | Kentucky |
| DB | Teez Tabor | Florida | Jamal Adams | LSU |
| DB | Tre'Davious White | LSU | Eddie Jackson | Alabama |
| DB | Minkah Fitzpatrick | Alabama | Quincy Wilson | Florida |
| DB | Aarion Penton | Missouri | Justin Evans | Texas A&M |
| PK | Daniel Carlson | Auburn | Gary Wunderlich | Ole Miss |
| P | J. K. Scott | Alabama | Johnny Townsend | Florida |
| RS | Christian Kirk | Texas A&M | Evan Berry | Tennessee |

(*) Indicates tie

=== National Award Finalists ===
Winners in bold

- Walter Camp Award (player of the year) – Jonathan Allen, Alabama
- Bednarik Award (best defensive player) – **Jonathan Allen, Alabama**; Myles Garrett, Texas A&M
- Bronko Nagurski Award (best defensive player) – **Jonathan Allen, Alabama**; Reuben Foster, Alabama
- Manning Award (quarterback) – Jalen Hurts, Alabama
- Butkus Award (best linebacker) – Kendell Beckwith, LSU; Zach Cunningham, Vanderbilt; Jarrad Davis, Florida; **Reuben Foster, Alabama**
- Jim Thorpe Award (best defensive back) – Tre'Davious White, LSU
- Ted Hendricks Award (best defensive end) – **Jonathan Allen, Alabama**
- John Mackey Award (best tight end) – O. J. Howard, Alabama
- Outland Trophy (best interior lineman) – **Cam Robinson, Alabama**
- Dave Rimington Trophy (best center) – Ethan Pocic, LSU
- Lombardi Award (best lineman/linebacker) – **Jonathan Allen, Alabama**; Myles Garrett, Texas A&M
- Lou Groza Award (best kicker) – Daniel Carlson, Auburn
- Wuerffel Trophy (humanitarian–athlete) – Trevor Knight, Texas A&M
- Campbell Trophy ("academic Heisman") – Brooks Ellis, Arkansas
- Mortell Award (best holder) – Connor McQueen, Texas A&M

=== All-Americans ===
- **HB** –
- **HB** –
- **TE** –
- **OL** –
- **OL** –
- **DL** –
- **DL** –
- **DL** –
- **LB** –
- **LB** –
- **DB** –
- **DB** –
- **DB** –
- **P** –
- **AP** –
- **AP** –
- **AP** –

== Home game attendance ==
| Team | Stadium | Capacity | Game 1 | Game 2 | Game 3 | Game 4 | Game 5 | Game 6 | Game 7 | Game 8 | Total | Average | % of Capacity |
|---|---|---|---|---|---|---|---|---|---|---|---|---|---|
| Alabama | Bryant–Denny Stadium | 101,821 | 101,821 | 101,821 | 101,821 | 101,821 | 101,821 | 101,821 | 101,821 | – | 712,747 | 101,821 | 100.00% |
| Arkansas | Razorback Stadium | 72,000 | 69,132 | 72,114 | 46,988^{B} | 75,459 | 73,786 | 74,432 | 75,156 | – | 487,067 | 73,346 | 101.87% |
| Auburn | Jordan–Hare Stadium | 87,451 | 87,451 | 86,825 | 87,175 | 87,451 | 84,243 | 87,451 | 87,451 | 87,451 | 695,498 | 86,937 | 99.41% |
| Florida | Ben Hill Griffin Stadium | 88,548 | 88,121 | 85,821 | 86,848 | 88,825 | 89,614 | – | – | – | 439,229 | 87,846 | 99.21% |
| Georgia | Sanford Stadium | 92,746 | 92,746 | 92,746 | 92,746 | 92,746 | 92,746 | 92,746 | – | – | 556,476 | 92,746 | 100.00% |
| Kentucky | Commonwealth Stadium | 61,000 | 57,230 | 49,669 | 51,702 | 55,030 | 50,414 | 62,507 | 48,948 | – | 375,500 | 53,643 | 87.94% |
| LSU | Tiger Stadium | 102,321 | 98,389 | 99,910 | 102,071 | 102,164 | 101,720 | 102,321 | 102,043 | – | 708,627 | 101,232 | 98.94% |
| Mississippi State | Davis Wade Stadium | 61,337 | 57,075 | 57,763 | 60,102 | 58,019 | 58,407 | 58,538 | – | – | 350,904 | 58,484 | 95.35% |
| Missouri | Faurot Field | 71,168 | 51,192 | 57,098 | 53,472 | 52,351 | 50,234 | 50,261 | 51,043 | – | 365,651 | 52,236 | 73.40% |
| Ole Miss | Vaught–Hemingway Stadium | 64,038 | 64,232 | 66,176 | 65,843 | 65,889 | 65,927 | 60,263 | 66,038 | – | 454,368 | 64,910 | 101.36% |
| South Carolina | Williams-Brice Stadium | 80,250 | 80,384 | 78,245 | 77,221 | 73,428 | 78,696 | 73,817 | 76,650 | – | 538,441 | 76,920 | 95.85% |
| Tennessee | Neyland Stadium | 102,455 | 100,074 | 101,362 | 102,455 | 102,455 | 98,343 | 101,075 | 101,012 | – | 706,776 | 100,968 | 98.55% |
| Texas A&M | Kyle Field | 102,733 | 100,443 | 96,412 | 106,248 | 99,960 | 104,892 | 102,502 | 102,961 | – | 713,418 | 101,917 | 99.21% |
| Vanderbilt | Vanderbilt Stadium | 40,550 | 30,304 | 29,627 | 30,565 | 31,084 | 27,763 | 38,108 | – | – | 187,451 | 31,242 | 77.05% |

^BGame played at Arkansas' secondary home stadium War Memorial Stadium, capacity: 54,120.

Attendance for neutral site games:

- September 3 – Alabama vs. USC, AT&T Stadium: 81,359
- September 3 – Georgia vs. North Carolina, Georgia Dome: 75,405
- September 3 – LSU vs. Wisconsin, Lambeau Field: 77,823
- September 3 – Ole Miss vs. Florida State, Camping World Stadium: 63,042
- September 10 – Tennessee vs. Virginia Tech, Bristol Motor Speedway: 156,990^{‡}
- September 24 – Arkansas vs. Texas A&M, AT&T Stadium: 67,751
- October 29 – Florida vs. Georgia, EverBank Field: 84,681

^‡ – Current NCAA record for largest attendance to a collegiate football game.
