= 2016 All-SEC football team =

American college football all-star team

The 2016 All-SEC football team consists of American football players selected to the All-Southeastern Conference (SEC) chosen by the Associated Press (AP) and the conference coaches for the 2016 Southeastern Conference football season.

The Alabama Crimson Tide won the conference, beating the Florida Gators 54 to 16 in the SEC Championship.

Alabama quarterback Jalen Hurts was voted the AP SEC Offensive Player of the Year. Alabama defensive end Jonathan Allen was voted the AP SEC Defensive Player of the Year.

== Offensive selections ==
=== Quarterbacks ===
- Jalen Hurts, Alabama (AP-1, Coaches-1)
- Joshua Dobbs, Tennessee (AP-2, Coaches-2)
- Chad Kelly, Ole Miss (AP-2, Coaches-2)

=== Running backs ===
- Derrius Guice, LSU (AP-1, Coaches-1)
- Kamryn Pettway, Auburn (AP-1, Coaches-1)
- Rawleigh Williams III, Arkansas (AP-1, Coaches-2)
- Leonard Fournette, LSU (AP-2, Coaches-2)
- Ralph Webb, Vanderbilt (AP-2, Coaches-2)

Saquon Barkley

=== Wide receivers ===
- Christian Kirk, Texas A&M (AP-1, Coaches-1)
- Fred Ross, Miss St (AP-1, Coaches-2)
- ArDarius Stewart, Alabama (AP-2, Coaches-1)
- Calvin Ridley, Alabama (Coaches-2)
- Josh Reynolds, Texas A&M (AP-2)
- J'Mon Moore, Missouri (AP-2)

=== Centers ===
- Ethan Pocic, LSU (AP-1, Coaches-1)
- Jon Toth, Kentucky (Coaches-2)
- Frank Ragnow, Arkansas (AP-2)

=== Guards ===
- Braden Smith, Auburn (AP-1, Coaches-2)
- Alex Kozan, Auburn (AP-1, Coaches-2)
- Martez Ivey, Florida (AP-2, Coaches-2)
- Will Clapp, LSU (Coaches-1)
- Avery Gennesy, Texas A&M (Coaches-1)
- Josh Boutte, LSU (AP-2)
- Ross Pierschbacher, Alabama (AP-2)

=== Tackles ===
- Cam Robinson*, Alabama (AP-1, Coaches-1)
- Dan Skipper, Arkansas (AP-1, Coaches-1)
- Will Holden, Vanderbilt (Coaches-2)
- Robert Leff, Auburn (AP-2)
- Jonah Williams, Alabama (AP-2)

=== Tight ends ===
- Evan Engram*, Ole Miss (AP-1, Coaches-1)
- O. J. Howard, Alabama (AP-2, Coaches-2)

== Defensive selections ==
=== Defensive ends ===
- Jonathan Allen*, Alabama (AP-1, Coaches-1)
- Derek Barnett*, Tennessee (AP-1, Coaches-1)
- Myles Garrett, Texas A&M (AP-2, Coaches-1)
- Carl Lawson, Auburn (AP-2, Coaches-1)
- Arden Key, LSU (AP-1, Coaches-2)
- Charles Harris, Missouri (AP-2, Coaches-2)

=== Defensive tackles ===
- Montravius Adams, Auburn (AP-1, Coaches-2)
- Caleb Brantley, Florida (AP-2, Coaches-2)
- Darius English, South Carolina (AP-2)

=== Linebackers ===
- Zach Cunningham, Vanderbilt (AP-1, Coaches-1)
- Reuben Foster, Alabama (AP-1, Coaches-1)
- Kendell Beckwith, LSU (AP-2, Coaches-1)
- Ryan Anderson, Alabama (AP-1)
- Tim Williams, Alabama (AP-2, Coaches-2)
- Jordan Jones, Kentucky (AP-2, Coaches-2)
- Jarrad Davis, Florida (Coaches-2)

=== Cornerbacks ===
- Teez Tabor, Florida (AP-1, Coaches-1)
- Tre'Davious White, LSU (AP-1, Coaches-1)
- Minkah Fitzpatrick, Alabama (AP-1, Coaches-1)
- Aarion Penton, Missouri (AP-2, Coaches-1)
- Quincy Wilson, Florida (AP-2, Coaches-2)

=== Safeties ===
- Jamal Adams, LSU (AP-1, Coaches-2)
- Justin Evans, Texas A&M (AP-2, Coaches-2)
- Eddie Jackson, Alabama (Coaches-2)
- Mike Edwards, Kentucky (AP-2)
- Marcus Maye, Florida (AP-2)

== Special teams ==
=== Kickers ===
- Daniel Carlson, Auburn (AP-1, Coaches-1)
- Gary Wunderlich, Ole Miss (AP-2, Coaches-2)

=== Punters ===
- J. K. Scott, Alabama (AP-1, Coaches-1)
- Johnny Townsend, Florida (AP-2, Coaches-2)

=== All purpose/return specialist ===
- Christian Kirk, Texas A&M (AP-1, Coaches-1)
- Isaiah McKenzie, Georgia (AP-2)
- Derrius Guice, LSU (Coaches-2)
- Evan Berry, Tennessee (Coaches-2)

== Key ==
Bold = Consensus first-team selection by both the coaches and AP

AP = Associated Press

Coaches = Selected by the SEC coaches

* = Unanimous selection of AP

== See also ==
- 2016 Southeastern Conference football season
- 2016 College Football All-America Team
