= Charles Harris (American football) =

American football player (born 1995)

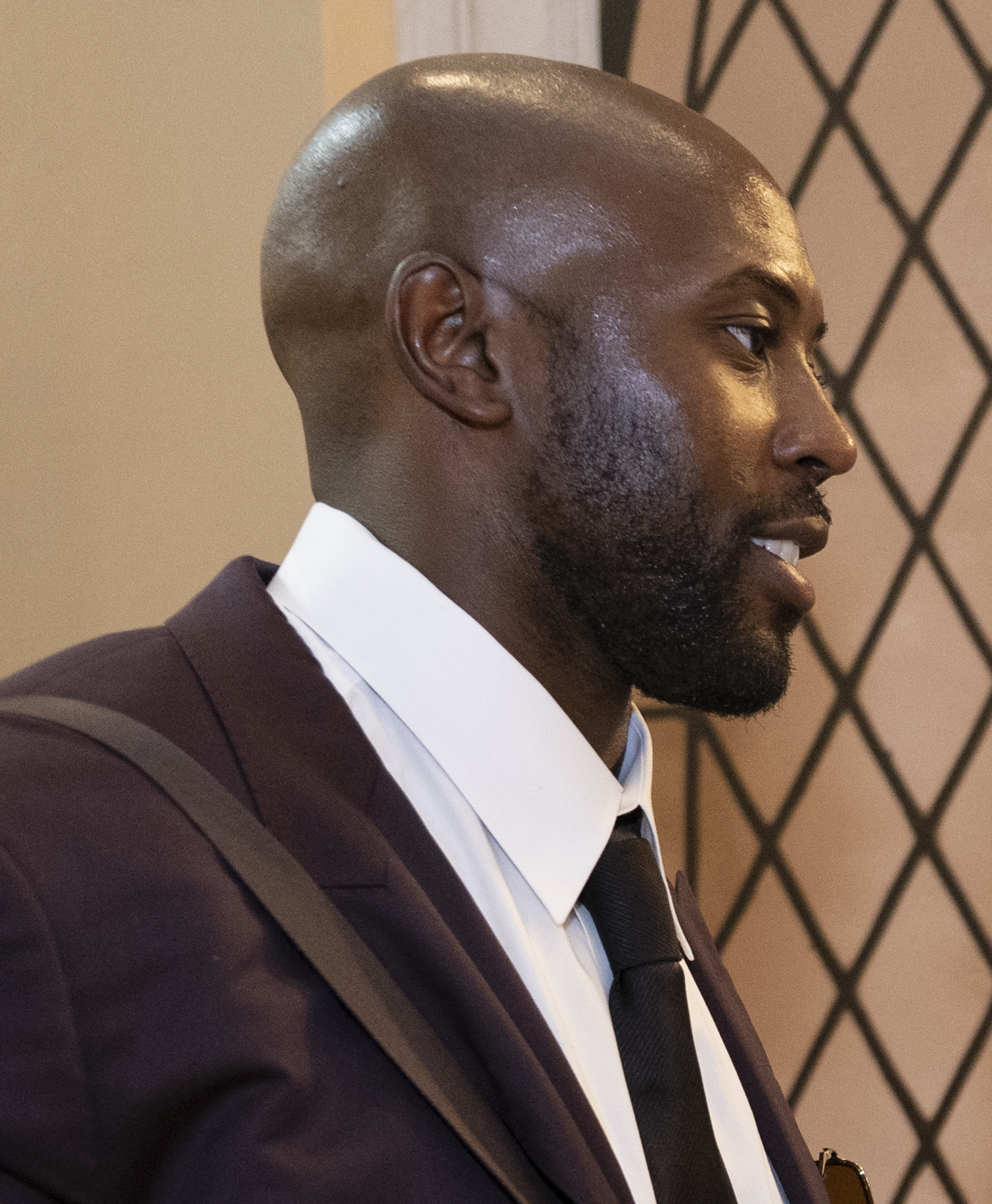
- Harris in 2025

Profile
- Position: Defensive end

Personal information
- Born: March 6, 1995 (age 31); Kansas City, Missouri, U.S.
- Listed height: 6 ft 3 in (1.91 m)
- Listed weight: 250 lb (113 kg)

Career information
- High school: Lincoln Prep (Kansas City)
- College: Missouri (2013–2016)
- NFL draft: 2017: 1st round, 22nd overall pick

Career history
- Miami Dolphins (2017–2019); Atlanta Falcons (2020); Detroit Lions (2021–2023); Carolina Panthers (2024); Philadelphia Eagles (2024)

Awards and highlights
- Super Bowl champion (LIX); 2× Second-team All-SEC (2015, 2016)

Career NFL statistics as of 2024
- Total tackles: 195
- Sacks: 19.5
- Forced fumbles: 3
- Fumble recoveries: 1
- Pass deflections: 5
- Stats at Pro Football Reference

Charles Harris (born March 6, 1995) is an American former professional football player who was a defensive end in the National Football League (NFL). He played college football for the Missouri Tigers and was selected by the Miami Dolphins in the first round of the 2017 NFL draft. He has also played in the NFL for the Atlanta Falcons, Detroit Lions, and Carolina Panthers.

== Early life ==
Harris attended Lincoln College Preparatory Academy in Kansas City, Missouri. As a junior, he had 40 tackles and six sacks and as a senior had 60 tackles and 12 sacks. He also had 15 receptions for 285 and five touchdowns. He committed to the University of Missouri to play college football. Harris also played basketball in high school and took boxing classes.

== College career ==
After redshirting his first year at Missouri in 2013, Harris appeared in all 14 games as a redshirt freshman in 2014, recording 19 tackles and two sacks. Harris took over as a starter in 2015 and had 56 tackles and seven sacks.

== Professional career ==
=== Pre-draft ===
Harris was invited to the NFL Combine and completed all the drills except for the short shuttle and three cone drill. He participated at Missouri's Pro Day and chose to perform positional drills and the short shuttle, three cone drill, vertical jump, and broad jump. Going into the draft, he was projected to be a first or second round pick by NFL draft experts and analysts. He was ranked the seventh best edge rusher by Sports Illustrated, the third best linebacker by ESPN, and was ranked the fifth best defensive end by NFL analyst Bucky Brooks, Mike Mayock, and NFLDraftScout.com.

Pre-draft measurables
Height	Weight	Arm length	Hand span	40-yard dash	10-yard split	20-yard split	20-yard shuttle	Three-cone drill	Vertical jump	Broad jump	Bench press
6 ft 2 3/4 in (1.90 m)	253 lb (115 kg)	32 3/8 in (0.82 m)	9 5/8 in (0.24 m)	4.82 s	1.65 s	2.78 s	4.40 s	7.35 s	37.5 in (0.95 m)	9 ft 10 in (3.00 m)	21 reps
All values from NFL Combine/Missouri's Pro Day

=== Miami Dolphins ===
The Miami Dolphins selected Harris in the first round (22nd overall) of the 2017 NFL draft.

=== Atlanta Falcons ===
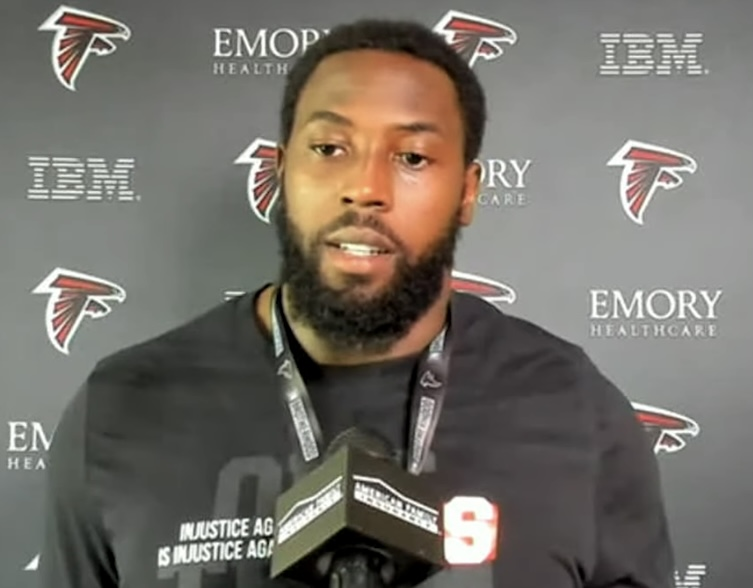
Harris with the Falcons in 2020.

On May 1, 2020, the Dolphins traded Harris to the Atlanta Falcons for a 2021 seventh-round draft pick. The next day, the Falcons declined the fifth-year option on Harris' contract, making him a free agent in 2021. In Week 8 against the Carolina Panthers on Thursday Night Football, Harris was ejected from the game after hitting quarterback Teddy Bridgewater's head while he was sliding.

=== Detroit Lions ===
On March 19, 2021, Harris signed with the Detroit Lions. On March 18, 2022, Harris signed a two-year, $13 million contract extension with the Lions. He was placed on injured reserve on November 28.

=== Carolina Panthers ===
On September 11, 2024, Harris signed with the Carolina Panthers. He was waived on November 25.

=== Philadelphia Eagles ===
On November 26, 2024, Harris was claimed off waivers by the Philadelphia Eagles. On December 8, Harris appeared in his first game as an Eagle, playing 4 defensive snaps in a 22–16 victory over the Carolina Panthers. He was waived by Philadelphia on December 28. On December 31, the Eagles re-signed Harris to their practice squad. Harris won a Super Bowl championship when the Eagles defeated the Kansas City Chiefs 40–22 in Super Bowl LIX.
