= Cam Robinson =

American football player (born 1995)

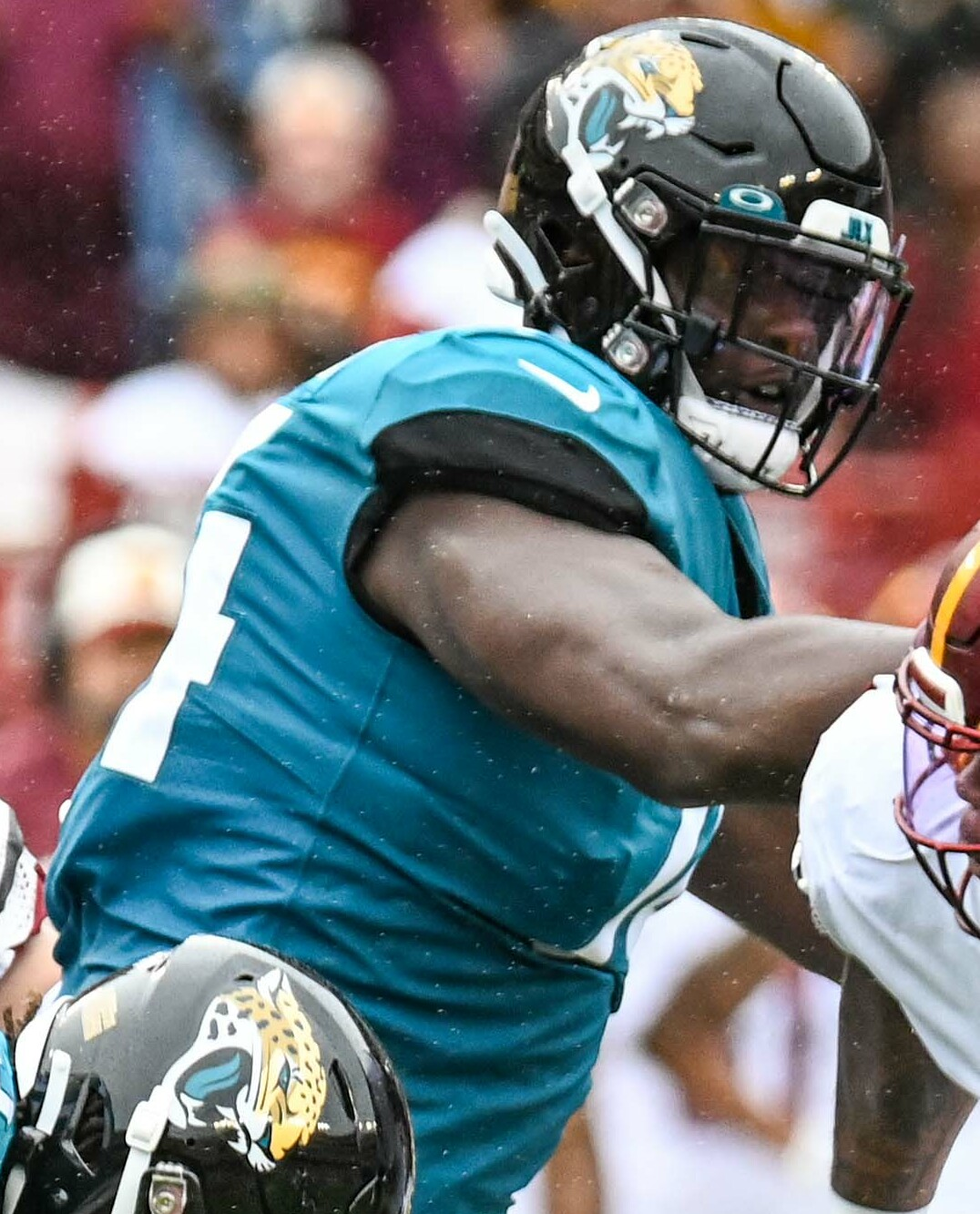
- Robinson with the Jacksonville Jaguars in 2022

Profile
- Position: Offensive tackle

Personal information
- Born: October 9, 1995 (age 31); Monroe, Louisiana, U.S.
- Listed height: 6 ft 6 in (1.98 m)
- Listed weight: 335 lb (152 kg)

Career information
- High school: West Monroe (West Monroe, Louisiana)
- College: Alabama (2014–2016)
- NFL draft: 2017: 2nd round, 34th overall pick

Career history
- Jacksonville Jaguars (2017–2024); Minnesota Vikings (2024); Houston Texans (2025); Cleveland Browns (2025)

Awards and highlights
- CFP national champion (2015); Outland Trophy (2016); Unanimous All-American (2016); Jacobs Blocking Trophy (2016); 2× First-team All-SEC (2015, 2016)

Career NFL statistics as of 2025
- Games played: 117
- Games started: 114
- Fumble recoveries: 3
- Stats at Pro Football Reference

Cameron D. Robinson (born October 9, 1995) is an American professional football offensive tackle. He played college football for the Alabama Crimson Tide.

== Early life ==
A native of West Monroe, Louisiana, Robinson attended West Monroe High School, where he was a two-time first team 5A Louisiana All-State selection by the Louisiana Sports Writers Association. In his senior season, West Monroe finished with a 9–3 record, losing to Central in the second round of the LHSAA Class 5A state playoffs. After the season, Robinson was named All-American by USA Today and Parade.

One of the most highly regarded recruits across all positions, Robinson was unanimously considered the No. 1 offensive tackle prospect of his class. With offers from almost every program in the nation, Robinson chose Alabama over Louisiana State. He graduated from high school in January to enroll at Alabama for the spring semester.

== College career ==
In his true freshman season at Alabama, Robinson started all 14 games. He was the first true freshman to start at left offensive tackle for the Crimson Tide since Andre Smith in 2006. Over a total of 861 snaps, Robinson surrendered only three quarterback sacks. He was part of an offensive line that gave up just 1.14 sacks per game, which ranked 14th nationally, while blocking for 484.5 yards of total offense per game. Robinson was named a Freshman All-American by Football Writers Association of America. After playing three years with Alabama, Robinson decided to forgo his senior year and enter the 2017 NFL draft.

== Professional career ==
Robinson received an invitation to the NFL Combine and completed all the combine drills except for the bench press, due to a shoulder injury. He participated at Alabama's Pro Day and opted to only run positional drills for team representatives and scouts. NFL draft experts and analysts projected Robinson to be a first or second round pick. He was ranked the top offensive tackle by Sports Illustrated, the second best offensive tackle by NFL media analyst Bucky Brooks, the second best interior offensive lineman by Mike Mayock, and was ranked the third best offensive tackle by ESPN and NFLDraftScout.com.

Pre-draft measurables
Height	Weight	Arm length	Hand span	Wingspan	40-yard dash	10-yard split	20-yard split	20-yard shuttle	Three-cone drill	Vertical jump	Broad jump
6 ft 6 1/4 in (1.99 m)	322 lb (146 kg)	35 1/2 in (0.90 m)	10 1/2 in (0.27 m)	6 ft 10 5/8 in (2.10 m)	5.15 s	1.78 s	2.98 s	4.82 s	7.81 s	26 in (0.66 m)	8 ft 10 in (2.69 m)
All values from NFL Combine

=== Jacksonville Jaguars ===
The Jacksonville Jaguars selected Robinson in the second round (34th overall) of the 2017 NFL draft. He was named the Jaguars starting left tackle as a rookie in 2017, starting 15 games.

In Week 2 of the 2018 season against the New England Patriots, Robinson suffered a torn ACL and was placed on injured reserve on September 17, 2018. In Week 3 of the 2020 season against the Miami Dolphins on Thursday Night Football, Robinson was ejected after making contact with a referee.

The Jaguars placed the franchise tag on Robinson on March 9, 2021, and he signed the one-year tender on April 9.

The Jaguars placed the franchise tag on Robinson for a second time on March 8, 2022, before eventually agreeing to a three-year contract extension worth $54 million on April 27. In Week 15 against the Dallas Cowboys, Robinson suffered a season–ending meniscus injury.

=== Minnesota Vikings ===
On October 30, 2024, the Jaguars traded Robinson and a conditional 2026 seventh-round draft pick to the Minnesota Vikings in exchange for a conditional 2026 fifth-round draft pick. However, due to meeting the condition of Robinson having enough play time, Jacksonville received a 2026 fourth-round pick instead (No. 117, which Jacksonville traded to the Las Vegas Raiders for Jakobi Meyers) and received back their seventh-round pick.

=== Houston Texans ===
On March 19, 2025, the Houston Texans signed Robinson to a one-year, $12 million contract. He made three appearances (including one start) during his time with the Texans.

=== Cleveland Browns ===
On September 29, 2025, Robinson and Houston's 2027 seventh-round pick were traded to the Cleveland Browns in exchange for a 2027 sixth-round pick.

== NFL career statistics ==
=== Regular season ===
Legend
**Bold**	Career high

Year	Team	Games		Offense					
Year	Team	GP	GS	Snaps	Pct	Holding	False start	Decl/Pen	Acpt/Pen
2017	JAX	15	15	889	83%	1	**7**	**4**	**10**
2018	JAX	2	2	71	53%	0	3	0	4
2019	JAX	14	14	873	90%	**4**	4	0	**10**
2020	JAX	16	16	**974**	94%	0	3	0	5
2021	JAX	14	14	857	94%	0	4	0	4
2022	JAX	14	14	914	**97%**	3	3	1	7
2023	JAX	9	9	535	83%	0	2	0	2
2024	JAX	7	7	367	87%	0	1	1	2
2024	MIN	10	10	632	91%	2	5	0	9
2025	HOU	3	1	59	34%	1	0	0	1
2025	CLE	13	12	696	87%	2	4	3	8
Career		117	114	6867	0%	13	36	9	62

== Personal life ==
On May 17, 2016, Robinson was arrested for possession of marijuana and weapons charges in West Monroe, Louisiana. According to the police booking information, he was charged with two misdemeanors, possession and illegal carrying of a weapon, as well as felony possession of stolen firearms. The charges were dropped on June 20, 2016, by the district attorney because of insufficient evidence. District Attorney Jerry D. Jones said "I want to emphasize once again that the main reason I'm doing this is that I refuse to ruin the lives of two young men who have spent their adolescence and teenage years, working and sweating, while we were all in the air conditioning."
