= Kendell Beckwith =

American football player (born 1994)

No. 51
- Position: Linebacker

Personal information
- Born: December 2, 1994 (age 31); Clinton, Louisiana, U.S.
- Listed height: 6 ft 2 in (1.88 m)
- Listed weight: 243 lb (110 kg)

Career information
- High school: East Feliciana (Jackson, Louisiana)
- College: LSU
- NFL draft: 2017: 3rd round, 107th overall pick

Career history
- Tampa Bay Buccaneers (2017–2019)

Awards and highlights
- First-team All-SEC (2016)

Career NFL statistics
- Total tackles: 73
- Sacks: 1
- Forced fumbles: 1
- Stats at Pro Football Reference

Kendell Beckwith (born December 2, 1994) is an American former professional football player who was a linebacker in the National Football League (NFL). He played college football for the LSU Tigers (LSU).

== Professional career ==
Coming out of LSU, Beckwith was projected by the majority of NFL draft experts and scouts to be a third or fourth round draft pick. He received an invitation to the NFL Combine, but was unable to perform any drills besides the bench press due to a torn ACL in his left knee that he suffered in November. On April 5, 2017, he attended LSU's pro day along with Leonard Fournette, Malachi Dupre, Jamal Adams, Ethan Pocic, Duke Riley, Tre'Davious White, and 11 other players. Beckwith was ranked the fifth-best inside linebacker prospect by NFLDraftScout.com.

Pre-draft measurables
Height	Weight	Arm length	Hand span	Bench press
6 ft 2 1/4 in (1.89 m)	243 lb (110 kg)	33 in (0.84 m)	9 1/2 in (0.24 m)	20 reps
All values from NFL Combine

The Tampa Bay Buccaneers selected Beckwith in the third round (107th overall) of the 2017 NFL draft. On May 23, 2017, the Buccaneers signed Beckwith to a four-year, $3.17 million contract that included a signing bonus of $706,288.

He competed with Cameron Lynch, Devante Bond, and Eric Nzeocha for a job as a starting outside linebacker. Head coach Dirk Koetter named him the starting strong side linebacker to begin the regular season. He made his professional regular season debut and his first career start during the Buccaneers' season-opener against the Chicago Bears and recorded five solo tackles and deflected a pass in the 29–7 home victory at Raymond James Stadium. On October 5, 2017, he recorded a season-high fourteen tackles in a 14–19 loss against the New England Patriots.

On April 12, 2018, Beckwith was in a car accident with former LSU teammate Lamin Barrow and suffered a fractured ankle which required surgery. He was placed on the reserve/non-football injury list on September 1, 2018, to start the season.

On May 10, 2019, the Buccaneers placed Beckwith on the reserve/non-football injury list for the second consecutive season, due to ongoing problems arising from the accident. He was waived with a non-football injury designation on July 28, 2020.
