= Ethan Pocic =

American football player (born 1995)

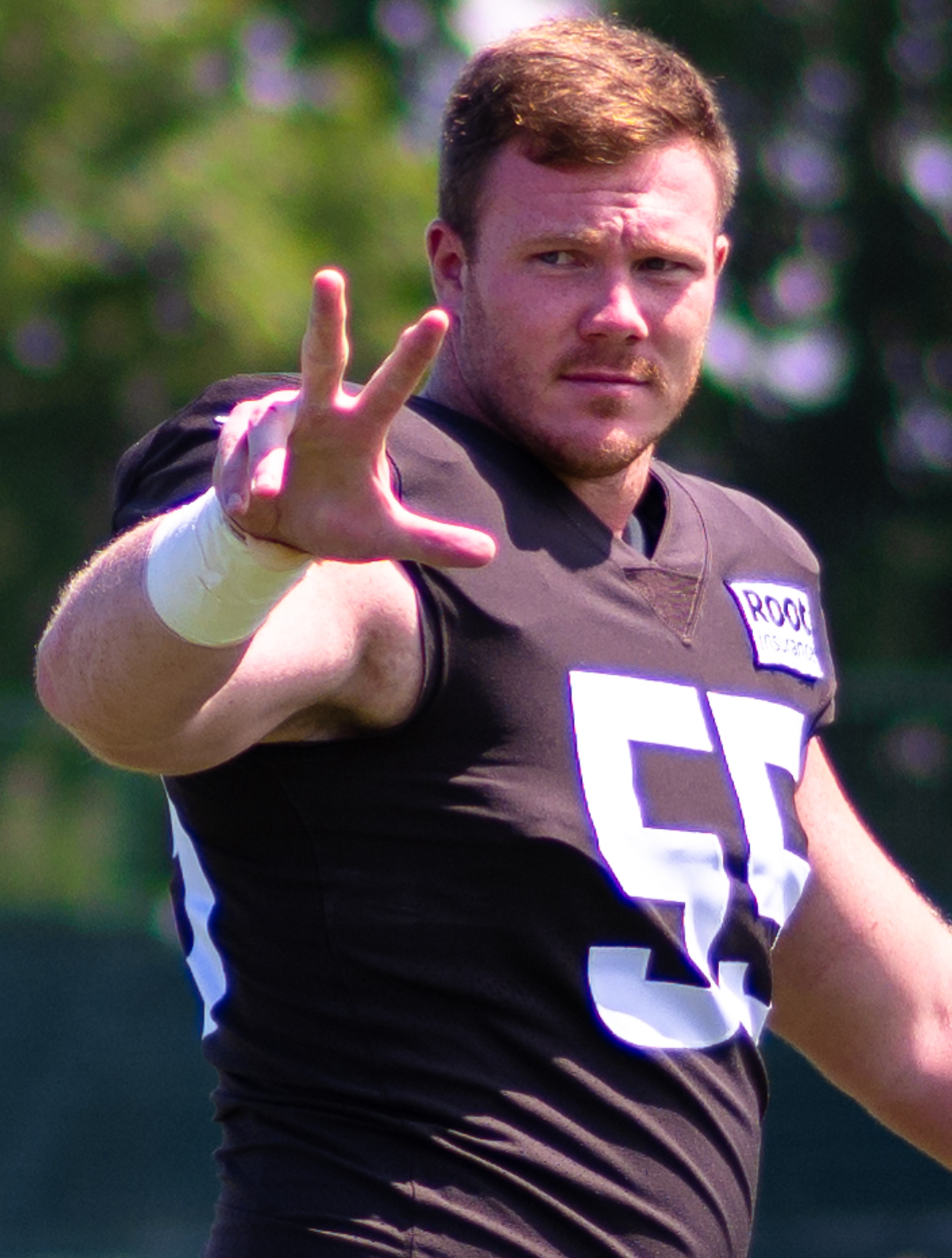
- Pocic with the Cleveland Browns in 2022

No. 77 – Baltimore Ravens
- Position: Center
- Roster status: Injured reserve

Personal information
- Born: August 5, 1995 (age 31); Lemont, Illinois, U.S.
- Listed height: 6 ft 6 in (1.98 m)
- Listed weight: 320 lb (145 kg)

Career information
- High school: Lemont
- College: LSU (2013–2016)
- NFL draft: 2017: 2nd round, 58th overall pick

Career history
- Seattle Seahawks (2017–2021); Cleveland Browns (2022–2025); Baltimore Ravens (2026–present)

Awards and highlights
- PFWA All-Rookie Team (2017); First-team All-American (2016); First-team All-SEC (2016); Second-team All-SEC (2015)

Career NFL statistics as of 2025
- Games played: 114
- Games started: 97
- Stats at Pro Football Reference

Ethan Pocic (/ˈpoʊsɪk/ POH-sik; born August 5, 1995) is an American professional football center for the Baltimore Ravens of the National Football League (NFL). He played college football for the LSU Tigers. Pocic has also played the guard position. He was selected by the Seattle Seahawks in the second round of the 2017 NFL draft.

Pocic was a second-team All-Southeastern Conference selection by SEC coaches as a junior in 2015. As a senior in 2016, Pocic was a finalist for the Rimington Trophy. That year, he was a first-team All-SEC selection by the Associated Press.

== Professional career ==
=== Pre-draft ===
Pocic received an invitation to the Senior Bowl and helped the South defeat the North 16-15. During the Senior Bowl, he met with the San Diego Chargers, Philadelphia Eagles, Cleveland Browns, and Baltimore Ravens. He also attended the NFL Combine and completed all the combine and positional drills. Although he attended LSU's Pro Day, he chose to only run positional drills for scouts and representatives. NFL draft experts and analysts projected Pocic to be a second or third round pick in the 2017 NFL draft. He was ranked the second best center in the draft by NFLDraftScout.com, Sports Illustrated, and ESPN, was ranked the fourth best interior offensive lineman in the draft by NFL analyst Bucky Brooks, and was ranked the fifth best interior offensive lineman by NFL analyst Mike Mayock.

Pre-draft measurables
Height	Weight	Arm length	Hand span	Wingspan	40-yard dash	10-yard split	20-yard split	20-yard shuttle	Three-cone drill	Vertical jump	Broad jump	Bench press	Wonderlic
6 ft 6 in (1.98 m)	310 lb (141 kg)	33 1/8 in (0.84 m)	10 1/8 in (0.26 m)	6 ft 8 3/8 in (2.04 m)	5.15 s	1.82 s	3.02 s	4.81 s	7.89 s	27.0 in (0.69 m)	8 ft 11 in (2.72 m)	26 reps	27
All values from NFL Combine

=== Seattle Seahawks ===
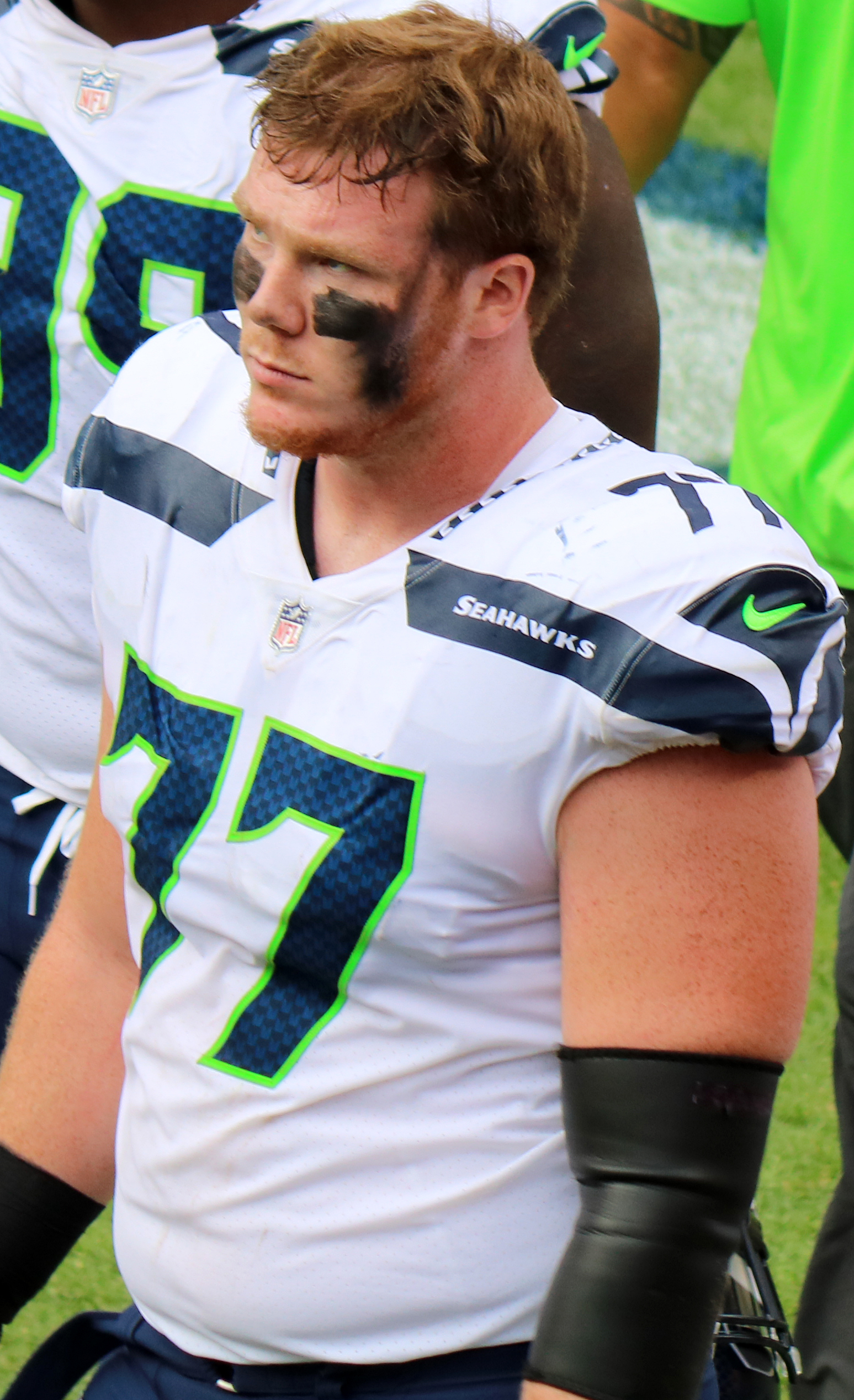
Pocic with the Seattle Seahawks in 2018

The Seattle Seahawks selected Pocic in the second round (58th overall) of the 2017 NFL draft.

Pocic made his first career start on October 22, 2017, against the New York Giants in Week 7. In his rookie season, Pocic started five games at left guard in place of an injured Luke Joeckel and the final six games of the season at right guard in place of an injured Oday Aboushi, allowing only two sacks all season. He was named to the 2017 PFWA All-Rookie Team after a solid rookie season.

On October 11, 2019, Pocic was placed on injured reserve with a back injury. He was designated for return from injured reserve on November 27, and began practicing with the team again. Pocic was activated on December 13. He was placed back on injured reserve on December 31.

Pocic re-signed with the Seahawks on March 22, 2021. He suffered a knee sprain in Week 1 and was placed on injured reserve on September 15. Pocic was activated on October 15.

=== Cleveland Browns ===
On April 6, 2022, Pocic signed with the Browns. He was named the Browns' starting center to begin the season. Pocic started the first 10 games before suffering a knee injury in Week 11; he was placed on injured reserve on November 22. He was activated on December 23.

On March 15, 2023, Pocic signed a three-year, $18 million contract extension with the Browns.

Pocic played 13 games for the Browns during the 2025 season, starting all of his appearances. In Week 14 against the Tennessee Titans, Pocic suffered a season-ending torn Achilles tendon.

=== Baltimore Ravens ===
On July 23, 2026, Pocic signed a one-year, $3 million contract with the Baltimore Ravens, which included $1.5 million in incentives. He suffered a knee injury in Week 3 and was placed on injured reserve on October 3, 2026.
