= Ralph Webb (American football) =

American gridiron football player (born 1994)

No. 22, 40
- Position: Running back

Personal information
- Born: November 21, 1994 (age 31); Gainesville, Florida, U.S.
- Listed height: 5 ft 10 in (1.78 m)
- Listed weight: 200 lb (91 kg)

Career information
- High school: Gainesville
- College: Vanderbilt
- NFL draft: 2018: undrafted

Career history
- New England Patriots (2018)*; Tampa Bay Buccaneers (2018)*; Pittsburgh Steelers (2018–2020)*; Saskatchewan Roughriders (2021)*
- * Offseason or practice squad member only

Awards and highlights
- Second-team All-SEC (2016)
- Stats at Pro Football Reference

Ralph Webb (born November 21, 1994) is an American former football running back. He played college football at Vanderbilt University, and was signed by the New England Patriots as an undrafted free agent after the 2018 NFL draft.

== College career ==
Webb played in 49 games at Vanderbilt between 2014 and 2017, and rushed for a total of 4,178 yards and 32 touchdowns. Webb hauled in 68 catches for 572 yards and 3 touchdowns.

== Professional career ==
=== New England Patriots ===
Webb signed with the New England Patriots as an undrafted free agent on May 11, 2018.

On August 9, 2018, during a preseason game against the Washington Redskins, Webb rushed for 46 yards and scored two touchdowns and two two-point conversions. He was waived on September 1, 2018, and was signed to the practice squad the next day. He was released on October 8, 2018.

=== Tampa Bay Buccaneers ===
On November 13, 2018, Webb was signed to the Tampa Bay Buccaneers practice squad. On December 3, he was released.

=== Pittsburgh Steelers ===
On December 4, 2018, Webb was signed to the Pittsburgh Steelers practice squad. He signed a reserve/future contract with the Steelers on January 1, 2019. He was waived/injured on August 8 and placed on injured reserve. On August 19, 2019, he was waived with an injury settlement. He was re-signed to the practice squad on November 18, 2019. Webb was selected by the Tampa Bay Vipers in the open phase of the 2020 XFL draft, but did not sign with the league. On December 30, 2019, he was signed by the Steelers to a reserve/future contract. He was waived on August 2, 2020.

=== Saskatchewan Roughriders ===
Webb signed with the Saskatchewan Roughriders of the CFL on February 23, 2021. He was released on July 30, 2021.
