= Derrius Guice =

American football player (born 1997)

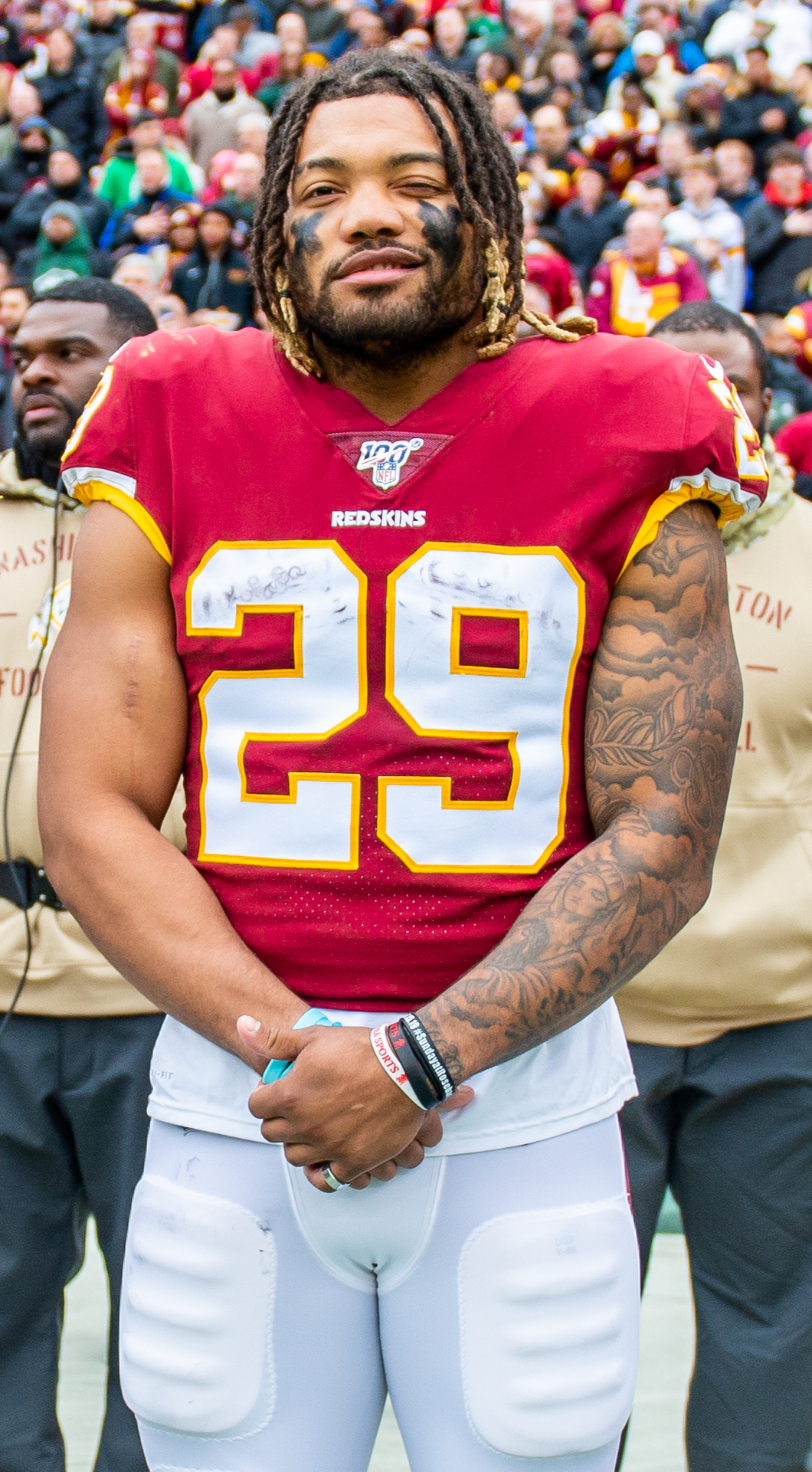
- Guice with the Washington Redskins in 2019

No. 29
- Position: Running back

Personal information
- Born: June 21, 1997 (age 29); Baton Rouge, Louisiana, U.S.
- Listed height: 5 ft 11 in (1.80 m)
- Listed weight: 225 lb (102 kg)

Career information
- High school: Catholic (Baton Rouge)
- College: LSU (2015–2017)
- NFL draft: 2018: 2nd round, 59th overall pick

Career history
- Washington Redskins (2018–2019); Vegas Knight Hawks (2023)

Awards and highlights
- First-team All-SEC (2016); Second-team All-SEC (2017)

Career NFL statistics
- Rushing yards: 245
- Rushing average: 5.8
- Rushing touchdowns: 2
- Receptions: 7
- Receiving yards: 79
- Receiving touchdowns: 1
- Stats at Pro Football Reference

Derrius Guice (/ɡaɪs/ GEISS; born June 21, 1997) is an American former professional football player who was a running back in the National Football League (NFL). He played college football for the LSU Tigers, becoming the first player in Southeastern Conference (SEC) history with three career games of 250 or more rushing yards before being selected by the Washington Redskins in the second round of the 2018 NFL draft.

Guice appeared in just five games in two years in the NFL due to multiple knee injuries and was released in 2020 after being charged for crimes related to domestic violence. LSU disassociated itself from Guice and removed all of his statistics from their record books in 2021 amid claims that the school had mishandled accusations of multiple rapes committed by him during his time there.

== Early life ==
Guice was born to parents Derrick Sr. and Beulah Guice on June 21, 1997, in a poverty-stricken section of Baton Rouge, Louisiana, known as "the Bottom". On May 3, 2003, Derrick was killed after being involved in a fight at a Denny's restaurant, with Guice learning of it after seeing the scene on the news. As a way to deal with his emotions and not feeling safe at home, Guice focused his life around football, with his powerful running style being described as "running angry".

Guice first attended McKinley High School. Due to his mother not liking the culture of McKinley, which she also attended, as well as his talents on the football field, Guice, along with three close friends and fellow football teammates, were given a scholarship to attend the predominantly white and affluent private school Catholic High. Guice would come home crying, Guice begged his mother to allow him to transfer back to McKinley. However, his mother said there was no way he was going to leave the scholarship behind, asking him about how many kids in their neighborhood had the same opportunity he did.

As a junior, Guice met Stephanie de la Houssaye, a white guidance counselor at the school. De la Houssaye gravitated toward the three boys, and Guice specifically, because of their struggles at the school and her ability to relate to them, as she had also grown up in poverty. Guice first befriended de la Houssaye after she had taken him home following a gang-related altercation at his house that left Guice unconscious. Over the course of his junior year, Guice began spending more time at the de la Houssaye household, eating dinner with her and her husband and children and going on vacations with them, eventually moving in with them. Catholic administrators had an issue with the close relationship, telling her to limit her guidance to school hours or she would lose her job. De la Houssaye chose to continue personally helping Guice over the job, with her stating that she never regretted the decision. Guice, when speaking about the situation while in college, claimed that the situation reminded him of the 2009 film The Blind Side, in which another black football player is taken in by a white family due to troublesome circumstances at home.

As a senior, he rushed for 1,341 yards with 21 touchdowns. Catholic went 9–2 on the season and lost 25–23 to New Orleans Brother Martin in the LHSAA Division I quarterfinals at BREC Memorial Stadium, after Guice was stopped on a two-point conversion that would have tied the game. After his senior season, Guice played in the U.S. Army All-American Bowl and was awarded the Pete Dawkins Trophy. Guice was rated by Rivals.com as a five-star recruit and was ranked as the second best high school running back at the time, behind Damien Harris. He committed to Louisiana State University (LSU) to play college football, fulfilling a promise he made to his father before his death.

== College career ==
Guice spent his true freshman year at LSU in 2015 as a backup to Leonard Fournette. He played in all 12 games, rushing for 436 yards on 51 carries with three touchdowns. Guice entered his sophomore season again as a backup to Fournette. He started his first career game in place of an injured Fournette during the team's second game of the season and ran for 155 yards and a touchdown on 19 carries. Against the Arkansas Razorbacks on November 12, Guice rushed for 252 yards, which was the second most in a game in school history. The total included a school-record 96-yard touchdown run in the fourth quarter. Two weeks later, against Texas A&M, he set the school single-game record by rushing for 285 yards, breaking the previous mark set by Fournette earlier in the season by one yard.

He became only the fourth running back in Southeastern Conference history to record multiple 250-yard rushing performances in a career, following Bo Jackson, Herschel Walker, and Moe Williams. He was named to the Associated Press first-team All-SEC team following the regular season. Guice saw limited play in several games in the first half of his junior season due to a left leg injury. In a game against Ole Miss that season, he rushed for 276 yards, becoming the first player in SEC history with three career games of at least 250 rushing yards.

=== College statistics ===
Year	Team	Games	Rushing					Receiving				
Year	Team	Games	Att	Yards	Avg	Long	TD	Rec	Yards	Avg	Long	TD
2015	LSU	11	51	436	8.5	50	3	5	20	4.0	10	0
2016	LSU	12	183	1,387	7.6	96	15	9	106	11.8	29	1
2017	LSU	12	237	1,251	5.3	59	11	18	124	6.9	20	2
Career		35	471	3,074	6.5	96	29	32	250	7.8	29	3

== Professional career ==
=== Pre-draft ===
Pre-draft measurables
Height	Weight	Arm length	Hand span	40-yard dash	10-yard split	20-yard split	Vertical jump	Bench press
5 ft 10 1/2 in (1.79 m)	224 lb (102 kg)	30 3/4 in (0.78 m)	9 3/4 in (0.25 m)	4.49 s	1.55 s	2.62 s	31 1/2 in (0.80 m)	15 reps
All values from NFL Combine

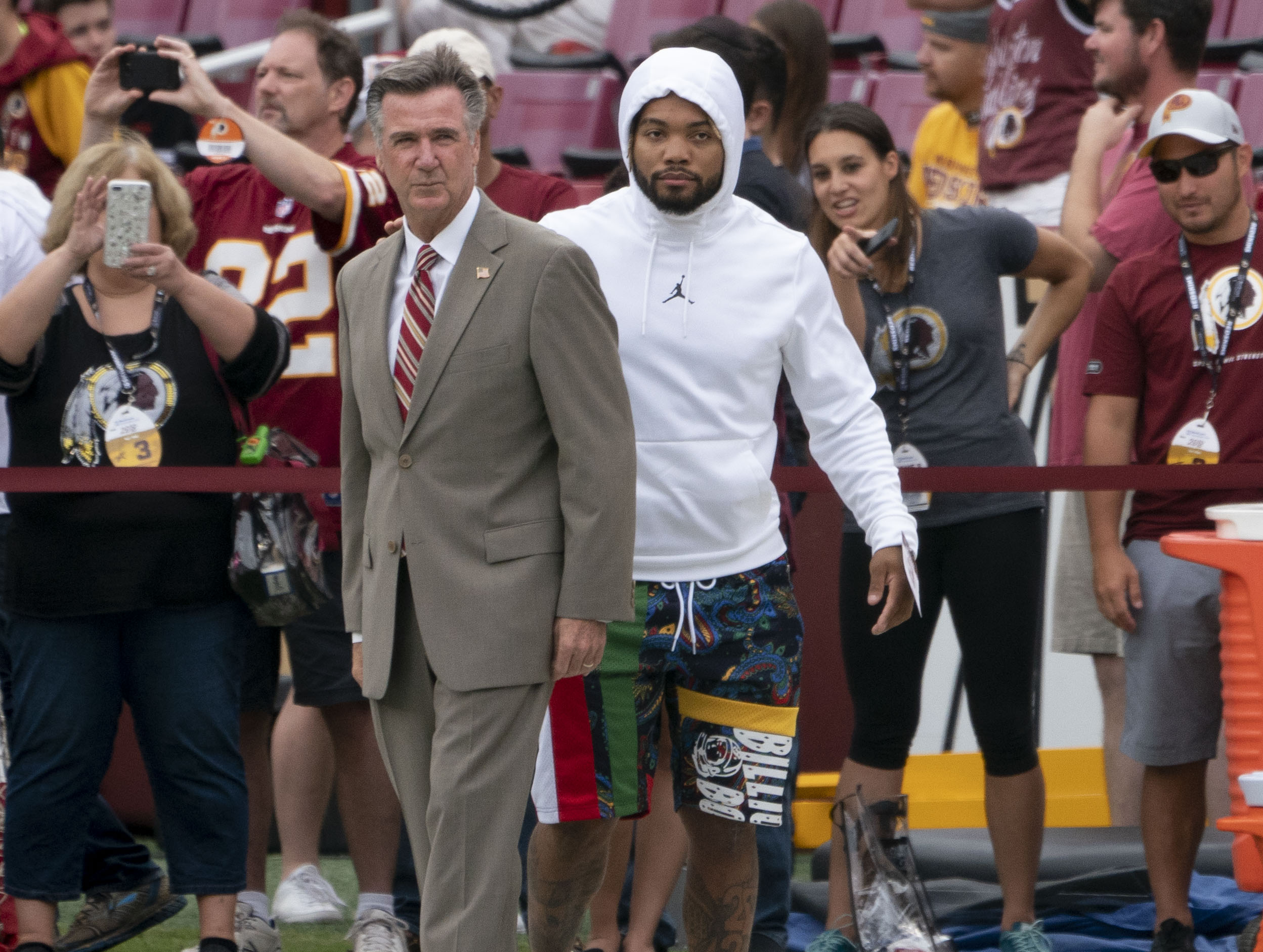
Guice alongside former Redskins team president Bruce Allen in 2018

In January 2018, Guice announced that he would forego his senior year at LSU in favor of the 2018 NFL draft. Guice attended LSU's pro day in April 2018, but opted to stand on his combine numbers and only performed positional drills. At the conclusion of the pre-draft process, Guice was projected to be a first or second-round pick by NFL draft experts and scouts. He was ranked among the best running backs of the 2018 class.

Predicted as a first-round pick before the draft, Guice reportedly had his draft stock fall due to questions about his character and other incidents during the drafting process, such as an alleged verbal altercation between himself and Howie Roseman, executive of the Philadelphia Eagles. Roseman and other Eagles personnel denied it took place, with Guice stating that the incident, as well as other rumors of him being lazy, immature, and dishonest, were not true. Another issue allegedly occurred at the NFL Combine, where Guice claimed that he was asked if he liked men during an interview with a team, as well as if his mother "sells herself". The NFL later investigated the claims, but found no proof it had happened.

=== Washington Redskins ===
Guice was eventually selected in the second round, 59th overall, by the Washington Redskins. On May 10, 2018, Guice signed a four-year, US$4.54 million contract with the team. In the first preseason game of his rookie year, Guice sustained a torn ACL, which ended his season.

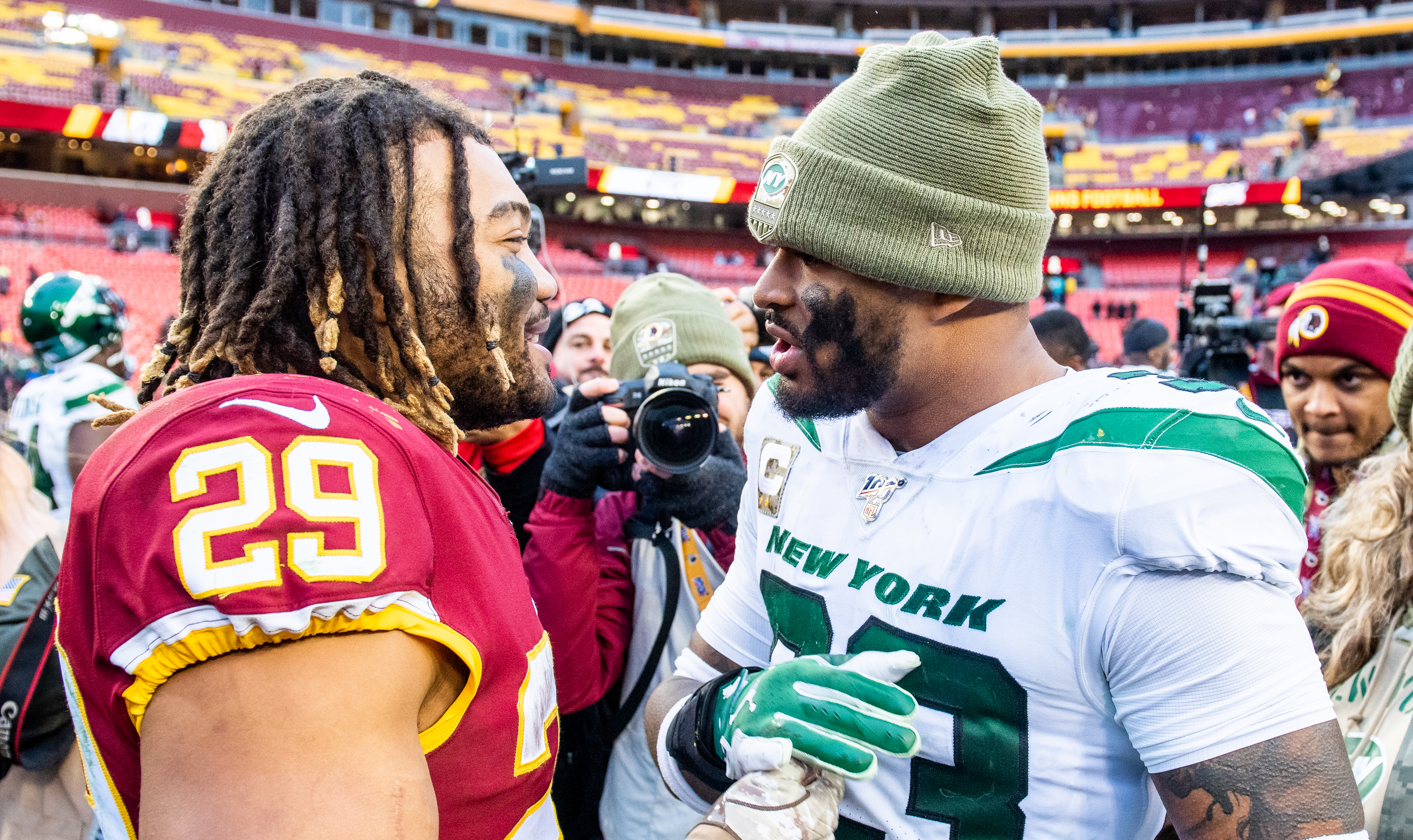
Guice (left) with Jamal Adams following a game against the New York Jets in 2019

Guice made his regular season debut in the opening game of the 2019 season against the Eagles. There, Guice rushed 10 times for 18 yards and caught 3 passes for 20 yards, but left the game with an injury to his right knee. The Redskins would go on to lose the game 32–27. It was later revealed that Guice had suffered a torn meniscus, requiring surgery, with him being placed on injured reserve on September 13, 2019. He was designated for return from injured reserve on October 28, 2019, and began practicing again with the team. He was activated off injured reserve on November 7. In Week 11 against the New York Jets, Guice rushed seven times for 24 yards and caught one pass for a 45-yard touchdown in the 34–17 loss. In Week 13 against the Carolina Panthers, Guice rushed 10 times for 129 yards and two touchdowns in the 29–21 win. The following week, he suffered an MCL sprain and was placed on injured reserve on December 10, 2019. Guice was waived by the team on August 7, 2020, following charges of domestic violence. After the charges were dropped in 2021, the NFL suspended Guice at the start of the 2021 season for six games for violating the league's personal conduct policy.

=== Vegas Knight Hawks ===
On February 23, 2023, Guice signed with the Vegas Knight Hawks of the Indoor Football League (IFL). He was released by the Knight Hawks on June 21.

== Personal life ==
Guice was the first athlete to sign with Top Dawg Entertainment's sports division agency, a record label better known for representing musical artists such as Kendrick Lamar and Schoolboy Q. Guice is a fan of and often livestreamed video games such as the Madden NFL series and Fortnite Battle Royale during his time with Washington.

Following a visit to the Mary Bird Perkins Cancer Center in June 2018, Guice set up a GoFundMe crowdfunding campaign for cancer research and raised over US$21,000 within a week.

In November 2016, Guice's brother Derrick Jr. was arrested and charged with attempted second-degree murder following an incident where he was the driver of two gunmen who shot at a man on his porch in Baton Rouge.

=== Legal issues ===
On August 7, 2020, Guice was arrested and charged with counts of strangulation, assault, battery, and destruction of property that stemmed from three separate domestic violence incidents that had taken place at his home in Loudoun County, Virginia earlier that year. The felony charge of strangulation was dropped in January 2021, and the four remaining misdemeanor charges were dropped in June 2021 following an undisclosed settlement between Guice and his former girlfriend. The arrest led to him being released by Washington. Later in August 2020, Guice was accused by two women of sexual assault that occurred during two separate instances while he was a freshman at LSU in 2016.

Soon after the rape accusations were made public, another former LSU student announced that she had filed a police report against Guice in 2016 for taking a partially nude photograph of her without her knowledge and sharing it with some of his football teammates, a felony under Louisiana law. Although the incident was reported to both LSU police and LSU's athletic department, Guice was not given any disciplinary action by the university. In March 2021, a 74-year-old woman accused Guice of sexual harassment from an incident at the Superdome in 2017. The following month, LSU announced it had disassociated itself from Guice, banning him from the athletics program indefinitely. It also removed all of Guice's statistics from its record books.
