= Jonathan Allen =

American football player (born 1995)

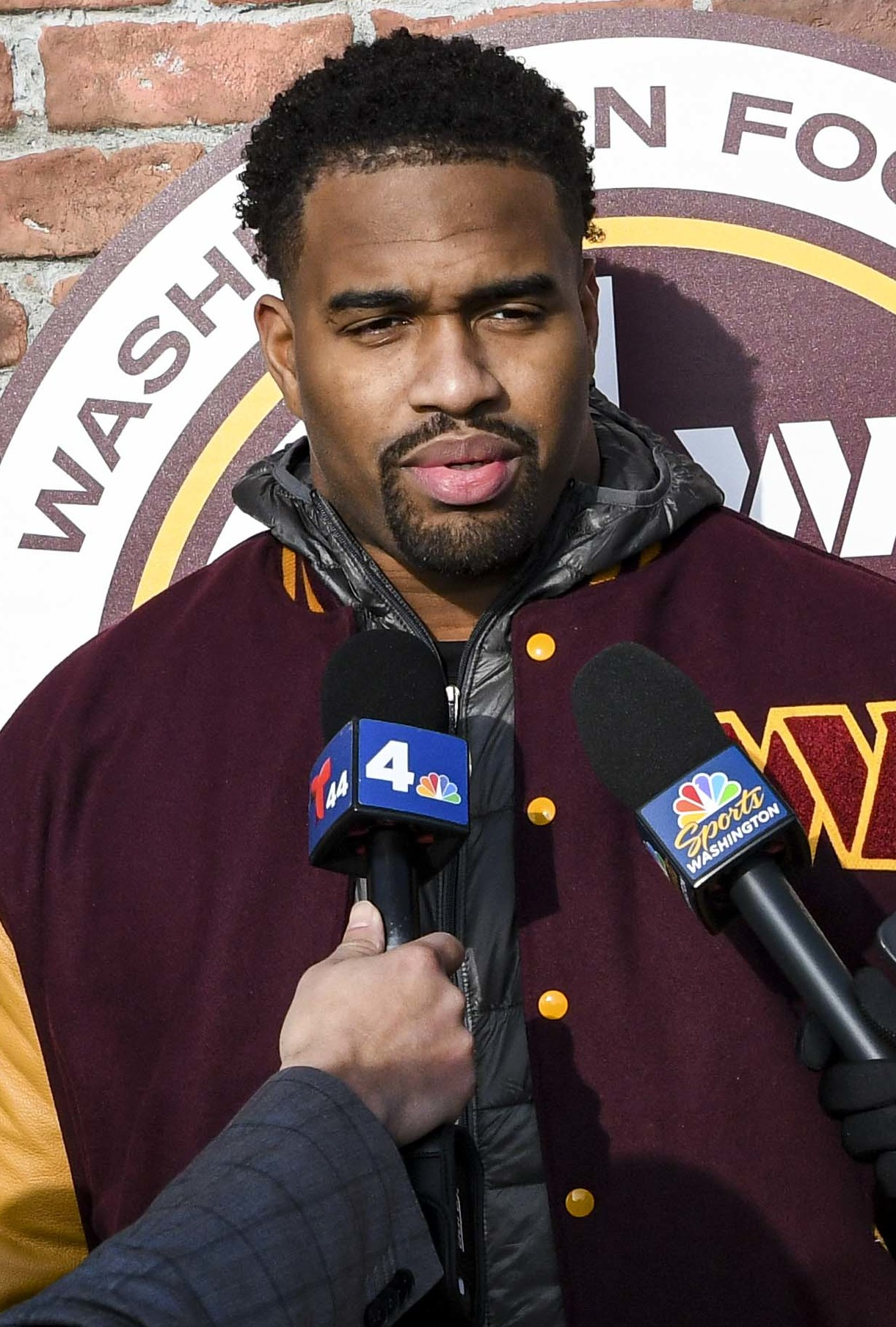
- Allen with the Washington Commanders in 2022

No. 93 – Cincinnati Bengals
- Position: Defensive tackle
- Roster status: Active

Personal information
- Born: January 16, 1995 (age 31); Anniston, Alabama, U.S.
- Listed height: 6 ft 3 in (1.91 m)
- Listed weight: 300 lb (136 kg)

Career information
- High school: Stone Bridge (Ashburn, Virginia)
- College: Alabama (2013–2016)
- NFL draft: 2017: 1st round, 17th overall pick

Career history
- Washington Redskins / Football Team / Commanders (2017–2024); Minnesota Vikings (2025); Cincinnati Bengals (2026–present)

Awards and highlights
- 2× Pro Bowl (2021, 2022); CFP national champion (2015); Bronko Nagurski Trophy (2016); Chuck Bednarik Award (2016); Ted Hendricks Award (2016); Lombardi Award (2016); SEC Defensive Player of the Year (2016); Unanimous All-American (2016); 3× first-team All-SEC (2014–2016)

Career NFL statistics as of Week 10, 2026
- Tackles: 491
- Sacks: 49.5
- Forced fumbles: 4
- Fumble recoveries: 4
- Pass deflections: 6
- Interceptions: 1
- Stats at Pro Football Reference

Jonathan Allen (born January 16, 1995) is an American professional football defensive tackle for the Cincinnati Bengals of the National Football League (NFL). He played college football for the Alabama Crimson Tide, winning a national championship in 2015 and several defensive player of the year awards in 2016. Allen was selected by the Washington Redskins in the first round of the 2017 NFL draft, where he made two Pro Bowls in his eight seasons with the team.

== Early life ==
Allen was born on January 16, 1995, in Anniston, Alabama, living in Seattle, North Carolina, South Carolina, Pittsburgh, and Maryland before settling down in Ashburn, Virginia, and attending Stone Bridge High School. Allen's parents split up when he was three years old and his mother was granted custody of him and his brother, Richard Allen III. At the age of eight, both he and his brother were taken away by child protective services. Allen spent ten months in foster care before his father, US Army Sgt. 1st Class Richard Allen Jr., won full custody of him and his brother in 2004. As a senior in 2012, he was the Virginia Gatorade Football Player of the Year. During his career, he had 308 tackles and 44 sacks. Allen was a five-star recruit and was ranked amongst the top of his class. He committed to play college football for the University of Alabama.

== College career ==
Allen played in 13 games as a true freshman at Alabama in 2013 and had 16 tackles. As a sophomore in 2014, he played in all 14 games and made 12 starts. He was named first-team All-Southeastern Conference after recording 33 tackles and 5.5 sacks. As a junior in 2015, Allen started all 14 games for the Crimson Tide, who won the 2016 College Football Playoff National Championship over the Clemson Tigers by a score of 45–40. Allen went on to win the Bronko Nagurski Trophy, Chuck Bednarik Award, and Lombardi Award for his performance in the 2016 season.

== Professional career ==
Pre-draft measurables
Height	Weight	Arm length	Hand span	Wingspan	40-yard dash	10-yard split	20-yard split	20-yard shuttle	Three-cone drill	Vertical jump	Broad jump	Bench press
6 ft 2 5/8 in (1.90 m)	286 lb (130 kg)	33 5/8 in (0.85 m)	9 3/8 in (0.24 m)	6 ft 8 7/8 in (2.05 m)	5.00 s	1.74 s	2.86 s	4.50 s	7.49 s	30.0 in (0.76 m)	9 ft 0 in (2.74 m)	21 reps
All values from NFL Combine

Allen was projected to be a top five pick by some NFL draft experts. His stock began to decline after teams became concerned when he was diagnosed with arthritis in one of his shoulders and had surgery on both, two weeks before the combine. He was ranked as the top defensive tackle by Sports Illustrated, Pro Football Focus, and NFLDraftScout.com. ESPN ranked him the second best defensive lineman behind Myles Garrett. Even with the arthritis diagnosis, Allen was projected to be a first-round pick by analysts and scouts.

=== Washington Redskins / Football Team / Commanders ===
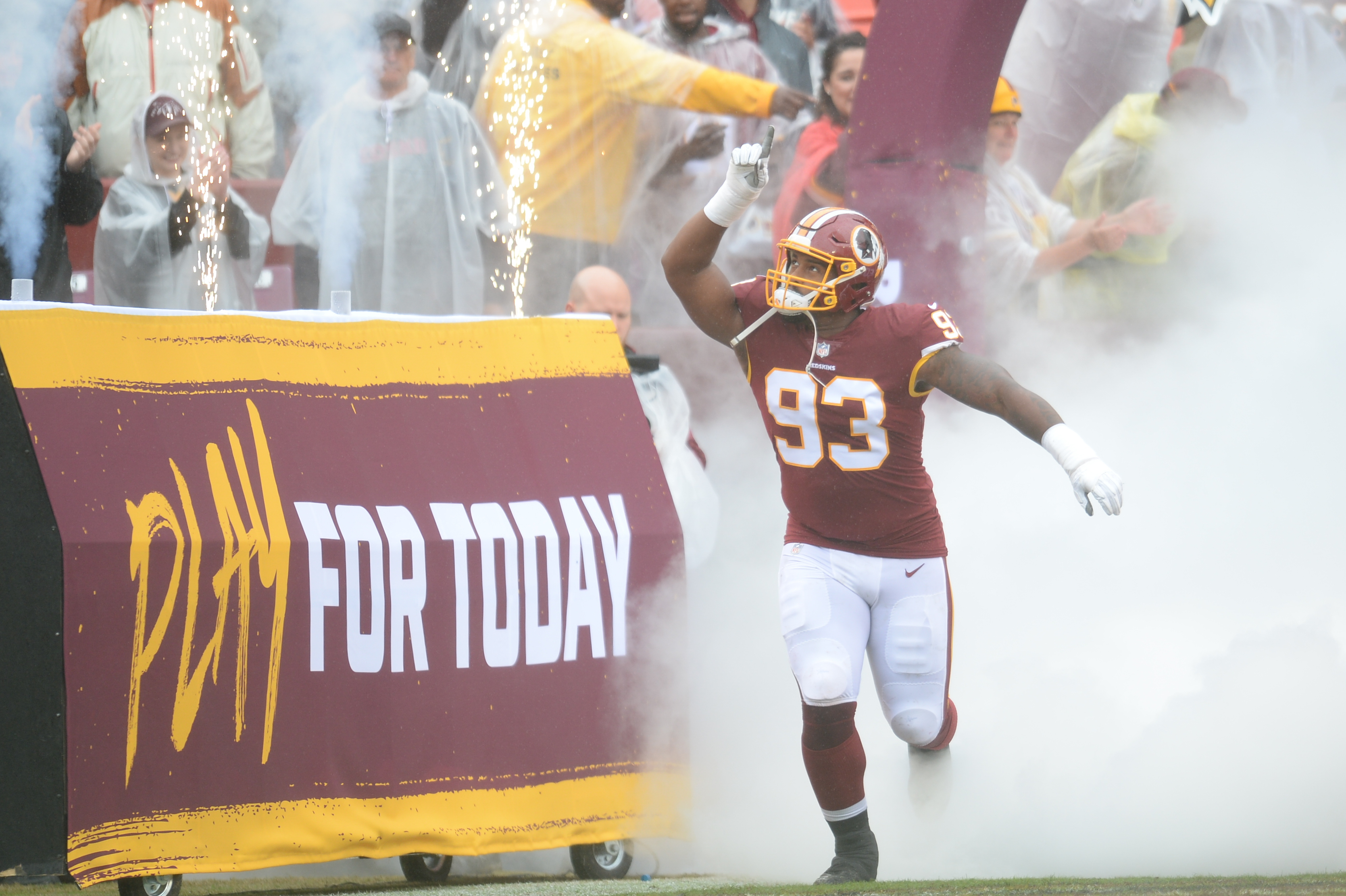
Allen with the Washington Redskins in 2018

The Washington Redskins selected Allen in the first round, 17th overall, of the 2017 NFL draft. He signed his four-year rookie contract, worth $11.59 million, on May 11, 2017. Allen recorded his first career sack in a Week 3 game against the Oakland Raiders. In Week 6, he suffered a Lisfranc injury against the San Francisco 49ers. He later underwent surgery and was placed on injured reserve on October 19.

Allen returned for the 2018 season and started all 16 games, recording eight sacks, 61 total tackles, and 15 quarterback hits. In the 2019 season, he started in 15 games and finished with six sacks, 68 total tackles (46 solo), one pass defended, one fumble recovery, and one fumble recovery. The team exercised the fifth-year option on his contract on April 27, 2020. After playing the defensive end position for the first three seasons of his career, Allen switched over to defensive tackle after the team's new defensive coordinator Jack Del Rio implemented a 4-3 defensive scheme. He finished the 2020 season with two sacks, 63 total tackles (36 solo), one fumble recovery, and one safety.

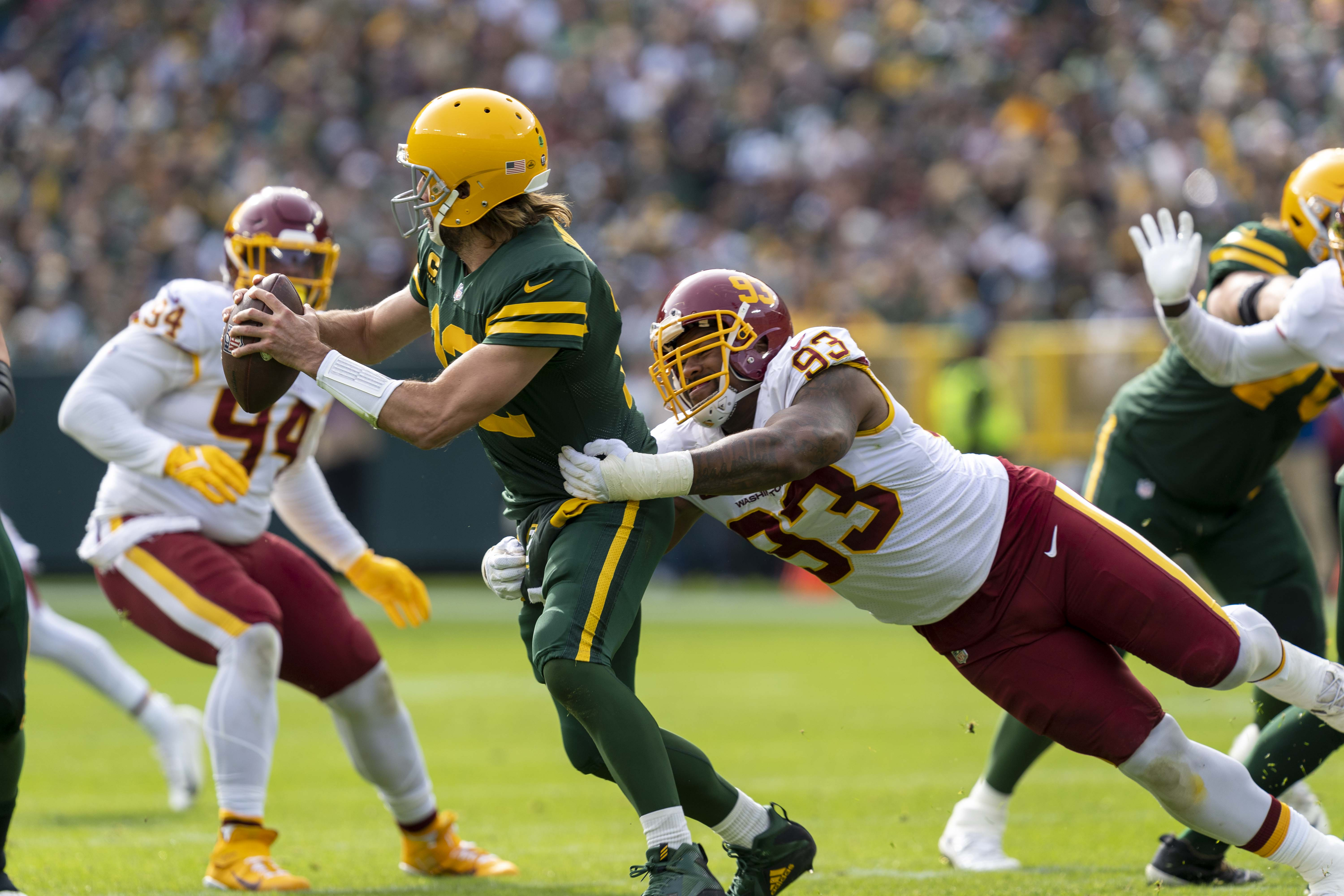
Allen sacking Green Bay Packers quarterback Aaron Rodgers in 2021.

On July 27, 2021, Allen signed a four-year contract extension worth $72 million. On December 13, he was placed on the COVID-19 reserve list, but placed back on the active roster five days later. After recording a sack in the Week 15 game against the Philadelphia Eagles, he set a temporary career-high of 8.5 sacks in a single-season. The following week, Allen punched teammate Daron Payne on the sideline during a blowout Sunday Night Football loss to the Dallas Cowboys. He went on to set a career-high of 9.0 sacks in a single-season in the season finale against the New York Giants. Allen was voted to his first Pro Bowl following the season, and was ranked 88th by his fellow players on the NFL Top 100 Players of 2022.

In Week 1 of the 2022 season, he recorded three tackles and a sack. In Week 6 against the Chicago Bears, Allen caught a pass from Justin Fields for his first career interception and had his first career forced fumble in the win. In December, he was voted into his second consecutive Pro Bowl, and was ranked 52nd by his fellow players on the NFL Top 100 Players of 2023. In the 2023 season, Allen started 16 games and finished with 5.5 sacks, 53 total tackles (30 solo), and one pass defended.

In Week 6 of the 2024 season, Allen partially tore his left pectoral muscle and was thought to be out for the remainder of the season. On December 28, he was activated off injured reserve prior to the Week 17 game. Allen finished the 2024 regular season with 19 tackles and three sacks over eight games.

On February 25, 2025, Allen was granted permission by the Commanders to seek a trade. He was released on March 7 after not finding a trade partner.

=== Minnesota Vikings ===
On March 11, 2025, Allen signed a three-year, $60 million contract with the Minnesota Vikings. In the 2025 season, he finished with 68 total tackles and one fumble recovery. On March 11, 2026, Allen was released by the Vikings.

=== Cincinnati Bengals ===
On March 13, 2026, the Cincinnati Bengals signed Allen to a two-year, $28 million contract.

== Career statistics ==
=== NFL ===
Legend
**Bold**	Career high

==== Regular season ====
Year	Team	Games		Tackles						Fumbles				Interceptions					
Year	Team	GP	GS	Cmb	Solo	Ast	Sck	Sfty	TFL	FF	FR	Yds	TD	PD	Int	Yds	Avg	Lng	TD
2017	WAS	5	5	10	3	7	1.0	0	0	0	0	0	0	0	0	0	0.0	0	0
2018	WAS	16	16	61	35	26	8.0	0	11	0	0	0	0	0	0	0	0.0	0	0
2019	WAS	15	15	**68**	**46**	22	6.0	0	7	1	**1**	0	0	1	0	0	0.0	0	0
2020	WAS	16	16	63	36	27	2.0	**1**	3	0	**1**	0	0	0	0	0	0.0	0	0
2021	WAS	17	17	62	31	31	**9.0**	0	10	0	0	0	0	0	0	0	0.0	0	0
2022	WAS	16	16	65	44	21	7.5	0	**16**	**2**	0	0	0	**3**	**1**	**1**	**1.0**	**1**	0
2023	WAS	16	16	53	30	23	5.5	0	10	0	0	0	0	1	0	0	0.0	0	0
2024	WAS	8	7	19	16	3	3.0	0	3	0	0	0	0	0	0	0	0.0	0	0
2025	MIN	17	17	**68**	29	**39**	3.5	0	7	0	**1**	0	0	0	0	0	0.0	0	0
2026	CIN	9	9	22	9	13	4.0	0	5	1	1	0	0	1	0	0	0.0	0	0
Career		135	134	491	279	212	49.5	1	72	4	4	0	0	6	1	1	1.0	1	0

==== Postseason ====
Year	Team	Games		Tackles						Fumbles				Interceptions					
Year	Team	GP	GS	Cmb	Solo	Ast	Sck	Sfty	TFL	FF	FR	Yds	TD	PD	Int	Yds	Avg	Lng	TD
2020	WAS	1	1	1	0	1	0.0	0	0	0	0	0	0	0	0	0	0.0	0	0
2024	WAS	**3**	**3**	**6**	**4**	**2**	0.0	0	**1**	0	0	0	0	0	0	0	0.0	0	0
Career		4	4	7	4	3	0.0	0	1	0	0	0	0	0	0	0	0.0	0	0

=== College ===
Season	GP	Defense			
Season	GP	Cmb	TfL	Sck	Fum
2013	13	15	3	0.5	1
2014	14	32	11	5.0	0
2015	14	36	14.5	12.0	2
2016	15	69	16	10.5	0
Total	50	152	44.5	28.0	3

== Personal life ==
Allen married his wife, Hannah, in July 2018. Due to his own personal experience with the foster care system, Allen has often helped with homeless shelters. Allen grew up as a fan of the Redskins.
