= Rawleigh Williams III =

American football player (born 1996)

No. 22
- Position: Running back

Personal information
- Born: August 28, 1996 (age 30); Dallas, Texas, U.S.
- Listed height: 5 ft 10 in (1.78 m)

Career information
- High school: Bishop Lynch (Dallas, Texas)
- College: Arkansas (2015–2016)

Awards and highlights
- Forbes 30 Under 30, 2025 Class; First-team All-SEC (2016)
- Stats at ESPN

Rawleigh Williams III (born August 28, 1996) is an American former football running back. He played college football at the University of Arkansas. Williams was named to the 2025 class Forbes 30 Under 30 List for their sport's category.

== Early life ==
Williams III attended Bishop Lynch High School in Dallas, Texas. During his career he rushed for 5,023 yards and 71 touchdowns, including 2,814 yards and 37 touchdowns his senior year. He originally committed to the University of Mississippi to play college football, but changed to the University of Arkansas.

== College career ==
As a true freshman at Arkansas in 2015, Williams rushed for 254 yards and a touchdown on 56 carries over seven games. He missed the final six games of the season after suffering a neck injury. Williams returned from the injury in 2016 and took over as the starting running back. He ended the regular season with an SEC leading 1,326 yards with 14 touchdowns. On May 8, 2017, Williams announced that he was stepping down from football due to an injury he suffered during spring activities.

== Work ==
In 2025, Williams was named Partner at management company Ecos Group after transitioning from Founding Partner at Milk & Honey Sports. In 2023, Williams also began as Co-Founder of sip Torne., an award-winning Dallas-based canned espresso martini company.
