= Bucky Brooks =

American football player and sportswriter

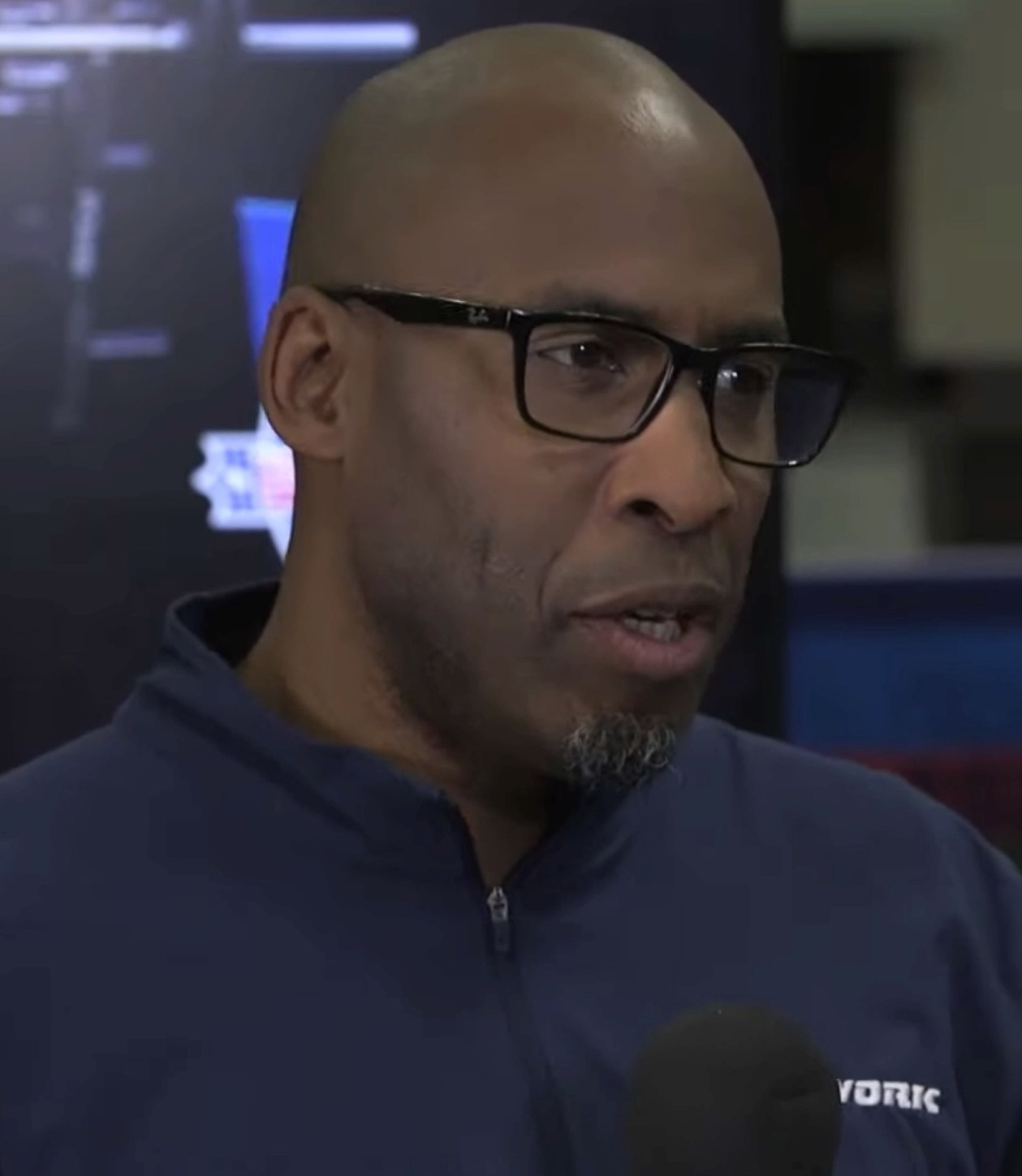
- Brooks in 2022

No. 81, 22, 45, 33
- Positions: Cornerback, return specialist

Personal information
- Born: January 22, 1971 (age 55); Raleigh, North Carolina, U.S.
- Listed height: 6 ft 0 in (1.83 m)
- Listed weight: 192 lb (87 kg)

Career information
- High school: Millbrook (Raleigh)
- College: North Carolina
- NFL draft: 1994: 2nd round, 48th overall pick

Career history
- Buffalo Bills (1994); Green Bay Packers (1995–1996); Jacksonville Jaguars (1996–1997); Green Bay Packers (1997); Kansas City Chiefs (1997–1998); Oakland Raiders (1998)

Awards and highlights
- Super Bowl champion (XXXI)

Career NFL statistics
- Tackles: 15
- Fumble recoveries: 1
- Return yards: 574
- Stats at Pro Football Reference

William Eldridge "Bucky" Brooks Jr. (born January 22, 1971) is an American sportswriter and former professional football player. He played for five National Football League (NFL) teams in a five-year career as a kick returner and defensive back. He was drafted in the second round of the 1994 NFL draft by the Buffalo Bills with the 48th overall pick.

Brooks is in his sixth season as an analyst for NFL Network and NFL.com. He contributes weekly columns, as well as video features including "Scout’s Take" and "On the Beat" on NFL.com, and offers interactive analysis on the latest NFL topics and headlines with weekly live online chats. He is currently the co-host on the podcast 'Move the Sticks', alongside Daniel Jeremiah. The two ex-scouts produce multiple podcasts each week during the NFL season and focus on topics such as NFL and NCAA game previews and reviews, and NFL Draft scouting. For the 2010 season, Brooks returned as an analyst for Thursday Night Football, NFL.com's in-game coverage of the Network's eight live, regular season game broadcasts. He is also a frequent guest on NFL.com's Dave Dameshek Football Program podcast, appearing approximately once per week to discuss the NFL draft and various listicles created for NFL.com.

Pre-draft measurables
Height	Weight	Arm length	Hand span	40-yard dash	10-yard split	20-yard split	20-yard shuttle	Vertical jump
5 ft 11 5/8 in (1.82 m)	189 lb (86 kg)	32 1/4 in (0.82 m)	8 3/4 in (0.22 m)	4.57 s	1.60 s	2.67 s	4.43 s	35.5 in (0.90 m)
All values from NFL Combine
