= 2016 Kentucky Wildcats football team =

American college football season

2016 Kentucky Wildcats football

TaxSlayer Bowl, L 18–33 vs. Georgia Tech
- Conference: Southeastern Conference
- Eastern Division
- Record: 7–6 (4–4 SEC)
- Head coach: Mark Stoops (4th season)
- Offensive coordinator: Eddie Gran (1st season)
- Co-offensive coordinator: Darin Hinshaw (1st season)
- Offensive scheme: Spread
- Defensive coordinator: D. J. Eliot (4th season)
- Base defense: 3–4 or 4–3
- Home stadium: Commonwealth Stadium

2016 Southeastern Conference football standings
| | Conf. | | | Overall |
| Team | W | | L | W | | L |
|---|---|---|---|---|---|---|
Eastern Division
| No. 14 Florida x | 6 | – | 2 | 9 | – | 4 |
| No. 22 Tennessee | 4 | – | 4 | 9 | – | 4 |
| Georgia | 4 | – | 4 | 8 | – | 5 |
| Kentucky | 4 | – | 4 | 7 | – | 6 |
| South Carolina | 3 | – | 5 | 6 | – | 7 |
| Vanderbilt | 3 | – | 5 | 6 | – | 7 |
| Missouri* | 2 | – | 6 | 4 | – | 8 |
Western Division
| No. 2 Alabama x$^ | 8 | – | 0 | 14 | – | 1 |
| No. 24 Auburn | 5 | – | 3 | 8 | – | 5 |
| No. 13 LSU | 5 | – | 3 | 8 | – | 4 |
| Texas A&M | 4 | – | 4 | 8 | – | 5 |
| Arkansas | 3 | – | 5 | 7 | – | 6 |
| Mississippi State | 3 | – | 5 | 6 | – | 7 |
| Ole Miss* | 2 | – | 6 | 5 | – | 7 |
Championship: Alabama 54, Florida 16
^ – College Football Playoff participant; $ – Conference champion; x – Division champion/co-champions; * Ole Miss and Missouri vacated all wins due to NCAA violations.; Rankings from AP Poll

The 2016 Kentucky Wildcats football team (variously "Kentucky", "UK", or "Wildcats") represented the University of Kentucky in the 2016 NCAA Division I FBS football season. The season was the program's 123rd overall and 83rd as a member of the Southeastern Conference (SEC). They were led by fourth-year head coach Mark Stoops and the played home games at Commonwealth Stadium in Lexington, Kentucky. They finished the season 7–6, 4–4 in SEC play to finish in a three-way tie for second place in the Eastern Division. They were invited to the TaxSlayer Bowl where they lost to Georgia Tech.

== Preseason ==
=== Departures ===
| Name | Number | Pos. | Height | Weight | Year | Hometown | Notes |
|---|---|---|---|---|---|---|---|
| Daron Blaylock | #7 | LB | 6'1" | 226 | Senior | Marietta, GA | Graduated |
| Zack Blaylock | #17 | DB | 6'0" | 193 | Junior | Marietta, GA | Graduated |
| Glenn Faulkner | #18 | DB | 6'2" | 201 | Junior | East St. Louis, IL | Graduated |
| Ryan Flannigan | #33 | LB | 6'2" | 225 | Senior | Missouri City, TX | Graduated |
| Josh Forrest | #45 | LB | 6'3" | 230 | Senior | Paducah, KY | Graduated |
| Jason Hatcher | #6 | DE | 6'3" | 247 | Junior | Louisville, KY | Transferred to West Georgia |
| Khalid Henderson | #22 | LB | 6'1" | 235 | Senior | Austell, GA | Graduated |
| Farrington Huguenin | #91 | DE | 6'4" | 271 | Senior | Columbia, SC | Graduated |
| Cory Johnson | #67 | DT | 6'3" | 300 | Senior | Columbia, SC | Graduated |
| Jabari Johnson | #47 | LB | 6'1" | 250 | Senior | Stone Mountain, GA | Graduated |
| Melvin Lewis | #90 | DT | 6'4" | 311 | Senior | Compton, CA | Graduated |
| Cody Quinn | #16 | DB | 5'11" | 185 | Senior | Middletown, OH | Graduated |
| A.J. Stamps | #1 | DB | 6'1" | 205 | Senior | Vicksburg, MS | Graduated |
| Jordan Swindle | #70 | OL | 6'7" | 304 | Senior | Jacksonville, FL | Graduated |
| Fred Tiller | #3 | DB | 6'0" | 196 | Senior | Homerville, GA | Graduated |
| Patrick Towles | #14 | QB | 6'3" | 235 | Junior | Fort Thomas, KY | Transferred to Boston College |
| Zach West | #67 | OL | 6'3" | 305 | Senior | Lexington, KY | Graduated |

=== 2016 signing class ===
Prior to National Signing Day on February 3, 2016, five players enrolled for the spring semester in order to participate in spring practice and included four former high school seniors and one junior college transfer.

On National Signing Day, Kentucky signed an additional twenty players out of high school and junior college that completed the 2016 recruiting class. The class was highlighted by three Army All-American's as well as Kentucky's Mr. Football.

College recruiting information (2016)
| Name | Hometown | School | Height | Weight | 40^{‡} | Commit date |
|---|---|---|---|---|---|---|
| Jaylin Bannerman #62 DE | Pickerington, OH | Pickerington Central High School | 6 ft 6 in (1.98 m) | 215 lb (98 kg) | | |
| Jaylin Bannerman #62 DE | Recruit ratings: No ratings found | | | | | |
| Jordan Bonner #4 LB (JUCO) | Lyndhurst, OH | Northeastern Oklahoma A&M College | 6 ft 5 in (1.96 m) | 215 lb (98 kg) | | |
| Jordan Bonner #4 LB (JUCO) | Recruit ratings: No ratings found | | | | | |
| T. J. Carter #57 DE | Mableton, GA | Whitefield Academy | 6 ft 4 in (1.93 m) | 245 lb (111 kg) | | |
| T. J. Carter #57 DE | Recruit ratings: No ratings found | | | | | |
| JaQuize Cross #83 DT | New Market, AL | Buckhorn High School | 6 ft 3 in (1.91 m) | 310 lb (140 kg) | | |
| JaQuize Cross #83 DT | Recruit ratings: No ratings found | | | | | |
| Kash Daniel #11 LB | Paintsville, KY | Paintsville High School | 6 ft 1 in (1.85 m) | 227 lb (103 kg) | | |
| Kash Daniel #11 LB | Recruit ratings: No ratings found | | | | | |
| Luke Fortner #117 OT | Sylvania, OH | Sylvania Northview High School | 6 ft 5 in (1.96 m) | 278 lb (126 kg) | | |
| Luke Fortner #117 OT | Recruit ratings: No ratings found | | | | | |
| Tobias Gilliam #69 DB | Dayton, OH | Wayne High School | 6 ft 0 in (1.83 m) | 185 lb (84 kg) | | |
| Tobias Gilliam #69 DB | Recruit ratings: No ratings found | | | | | |
| Jordan Griffin #37 DB | Jonesboro, GA | Jonesboro High School | 6 ft 1 in (1.85 m) | 170 lb (77 kg) | | |
| Jordan Griffin #37 DB | Recruit ratings: No ratings found | | | | | |
| Gunnar Hoak #40 QB | Dublin, OH | Dublin Coffman High School | 6 ft 4 in (1.93 m) | 190 lb (86 kg) | | |
| Gunnar Hoak #40 QB | Recruit ratings: No ratings found | | | | | |
| Dakota Holtzclaw #42 TE | Columbus, OH | Worthington Kilbourne High School | 6 ft 7 in (2.01 m) | 215 lb (98 kg) | | |
| Dakota Holtzclaw #42 TE | Recruit ratings: No ratings found | | | | | |
| Zy'Aire Hughes #52 ATH | Paducah, KY | McCracken County High School | 5 ft 11 in (1.80 m) | 180 lb (82 kg) | | |
| Zy'Aire Hughes #52 ATH | Recruit ratings: No ratings found | | | | | |
| Drake Jackson #2 C | Versailles, KY | Woodford County High School | 6 ft 2 in (1.88 m) | 290 lb (130 kg) | | |
| Drake Jackson #2 C | Recruit ratings: No ratings found | | | | | |
| Stephen Johnson #5 QB (JUCO) | Rancho Cucamonga, CA | College of the Desert | 6 ft 3 in (1.91 m) | 195 lb (88 kg) | | |
| Stephen Johnson #5 QB (JUCO) | Recruit ratings: No ratings found | | | | | |
| Tate Leavitt #5 OT (JUCO) | Thornville, OH | Hutchinson Community College | 6 ft 6 in (1.98 m) | 295 lb (134 kg) | | |
| Tate Leavitt #5 OT (JUCO) | Recruit ratings: No ratings found | | | | | |
| Kordell Looney #57 DT | Springfield, OH | Springfield High School | 6 ft 4 in (1.93 m) | 285 lb (129 kg) | | |
| Kordell Looney #57 DT | Recruit ratings: No ratings found | | | | | |
| Grant McKinniss #5 P/K | Findlay, OH | Findlay High School | 6 ft 1 in (1.85 m) | 190 lb (86 kg) | | |
| Grant McKinniss #5 P/K | Recruit ratings: No ratings found | | | | | |
| Naquez Pringle #28 DT (JUCO) | Georgetown, SC | Itawamba Community College | 6 ft 3 in (1.91 m) | 330 lb (150 kg) | | |
| Naquez Pringle #28 DT (JUCO) | Recruit ratings: No ratings found | | | | | |
| Justin Rigg #64 TE | Springboro, OH | Springboro High School | 6 ft 6 in (1.98 m) | 240 lb (110 kg) | | |
| Justin Rigg #64 TE | Recruit ratings: No ratings found | | | | | |
| Davonte Robinson #92 DB | Lexington, KY | Henry Clay High School | 6 ft 1 in (1.85 m) | 165 lb (75 kg) | | |
| Davonte Robinson #92 DB | Recruit ratings: No ratings found | | | | | |
| A. J. Rose #80 RB | Cleveland, OH | Garfield Heights High School | 6 ft 2 in (1.88 m) | 185 lb (84 kg) | | |
| A. J. Rose #80 RB | Recruit ratings: No ratings found | | | | | |
| Kayaune Ross #18 WR (JUCO) | West Chester, OH | Phoenix College | 6 ft 6 in (1.98 m) | 220 lb (100 kg) | | |
| Kayaune Ross #18 WR (JUCO) | Recruit ratings: No ratings found | | | | | |
| Benny Snell #56 RB | Westerville, OH | Westerville Central High School | 5 ft 11 in (1.80 m) | 200 lb (91 kg) | | |
| Benny Snell #56 RB | Recruit ratings: No ratings found | | | | | |
| Roland Walder #36 LB | Dayton, OH | Trotwood-Madison High School | 6 ft 3 in (1.91 m) | 220 lb (100 kg) | | |
| Roland Walder #36 LB | Recruit ratings: No ratings found | | | | | |
| Jamar Watson #112 LB | District Heights, MD | Bishop McNamara High School | 6 ft 2 in (1.88 m) | 220 lb (100 kg) | | |
| Jamar Watson #112 LB | Recruit ratings: No ratings found | | | | | |
| Landon Young #6 OT | Lexington, KY | Lafayette High School | 6 ft 7 in (2.01 m) | 270 lb (120 kg) | | |
| Landon Young #6 OT | Recruit ratings: No ratings found | | | | | |
Overall recruit ranking:
Note: In many cases, Scout, Rivals, 247Sports, On3, and ESPN may conflict in their listings of height and weight.; In these cases, the average was taken. ESPN grades are on a 100-point scale.; Sources: "2016 Kentucky Football Commitment List". Rivals.; "2016 Team Ranking". Rivals.com.; "2016 Kentucky Wildcats football team". 247Sports.

== Personnel ==
=== Coaching staff ===
Kentucky head coach Mark Stoops enters his fourth season as the Wildcat's head coach for the 2016 season. During his previous three seasons he led the Wildcats to an overall record of 12 wins and 24 losses.

On December 18, 2015, offensive coordinator Shannon Dawson announced he would not return to the program for the 2016 season as the offensive coordinator. In his place Kentucky hired Cincinnati offensive coordinator Eddie Gran as the assistant head coach of offense at Kentucky. Cincinnati quarterbacks coach Darin Hinshaw has also joined the UK staff as quarterbacks coach and co-offensive coordinator.

| Name | Position | Consecutive season at Kentucky in current position |
|---|---|---|
| Mark Stoops | Head coach | 3rd |
| Eddie Gran | Offensive coordinator, Running backs | 1st |
| D. J. Eliot | Defensive coordinator | 3rd |
| Steve Clinkscale | Defensive backs | 1st |
| Jimmy Brumbaugh | Defensive line | 3rd |
| Lamar Thomas | Wide receivers | 1st |
| Vince Marrow | Tight ends, recruiting coordinator | 3rd |
| John Schlarman | Offensive line | 3rd |
| Darin Hinshaw | Quarterbacks | 1st |
| Matt House | Special teams coordinator, inside linebackers | 1st |
| Corey Edmond | Strength and conditioning | 1st |

=== Returning starters ===
==== Offense ====
| Player | Class | Position |
|---|---|---|
| Dorian Baker | Junior | Wide receiver |
| C. J. Conrad | Sophomore | Tight end |
| Nick Haynes | RS-Junior | Offensive guard |
| Garrett Johnson | Junior | Wide receiver |
| Ramsey Meyers | RS-Junior | Offensive guard |
| Jon Toth | Senior | Center |
| Stanley Williams | Junior | Running back |

==== Defense ====
| Player | Class | Position |
|---|---|---|
| Mike Edwards | RS-Sophomore | Safety |
| Blake McClain | Senior | Safety |
| Denzil Ware | RS=Sophomore | Linebacker |
| Chris Westry | Sophomore | Cornerback |

==== Special teams ====
| Player | Class | Position |
|---|---|---|
| Austin MacGinnis | Junior | Kicker |

=== Roster ===
2016 Kentucky Wildcats football team roster
Players
Coaches
Offense

| Pos. | # | Name | Class |
|---|---|---|---|
| WR | 1 | Ryan Timmons | Sr |
| WR | 2 | Dorian Baker | Jr |
| RB | 3 | Jojo Kemp | Sr |
| WR | 6 | Blake Bone | Jr |
| QB | 7 | Drew Barker | So |
| WR | 8 | Jabari Greenwood | Fr |
| WR | 9 | Garrett Johnson | Jr |
| RB | 10 | A. J. Rose | Fr |
| WR | 11 | Tavin Richardson | Fr |
| QB | 12 | Gunnar Hoak | Fr |
| WR | 13 | Jeff Badet | Jr |
| QB | 14 | Luke Wright | So |
| QB | 15 | Stephen Johnson | Jr |
| QB | 16 | Davis Mattingly | Fr |
| WR | 17 | Alexander Montgomery | Jr |
| RB | 18 | Stanley Williams | Jr |
| WR | 19 | Kayaune Ross | So |
| WR | 20 | Ryan Kendall | So |
| RB | 22 | Sihiem King | So |
| RB | 24 | Zach Johnson | Fr |
| RB | 25 | Harold Turks | Fr |
| RB | 26 | Benny Snell | Fr |
| RB | 30 | Ditalian Tabler | Fr |
| WR | 31 | David Bouvier | So |
| RB | 32 | William Mahone | Jr |
| WR | 42 | Kynan Smith | Fr |
| FB | 48 | Will Collins | Sr |
| TE | 49 | Tanner Fink | Sr |
| C | 52 | Drake Jackson | Fr |
| G | 55 | David Baumer | So |
| G | 57 | Zach Myers | Sr |
| G | 61 | Tristen Salyer | Fr |
| C | 62 | Dylan Greenburg | Jr |
| G | 63 | Wells Purdom | Fr |
| G | 64 | George Asafo-Adjei | So |
| G | 65 | Jervontius Stallings | So |
| OT | 67 | Landon Young | Fr |
| G | 68 | Nick Haynes | Jr |
| G | 69 | Ramsey Meyers | Jr |
| G | 71 | Logan Stenberg | Fr |
| C | 72 | Jon Toth | Sr |
| OT | 73 | Kyle Meadows | Jr |
| G | 74 | Cole Mosier | Jr |
| OT | 75 | Tate Leavitt | Jr |
| OT | 77 | Mason Wolfe | Fr |
| WR | 80 | Marvin Robinson | Fr |
| WR | 81 | Dakota Holtzclaw | Fr |
| TE | 83 | Justin Rigg | Fr |
| WR | 84 | Charles Moushey | Jr |
| TE | 85 | Greg Hart | Jr |
| TE | 86 | Darryl Long | So |
| TE | 87 | C. J. Conrad | So |
| WR | 88 | Charles Walker | Jr |
| WR | 89 | Zy'Aire Hughes | Fr |

Defense

| Pos. | # | Name | Class |
|---|---|---|---|
| CB | 3 | Jordan Griffin | Fr |
| S | 4 | Marcus Walker | Fr |
| CB | 5 | Kendall Randolph | Jr |
| LB | 8 | Kobie Walker | So |
| CB | 9 | Davonte Robinson | Fr |
| CB | 11 | J.D. Harmon | Jr |
| LB | 14 | Dorian Hendrix | Fr |
| S | 15 | Marcus McWilson | Sr |
| CB | 16 | Cody Quinn | Sr |
| CB | 17 | Tobias Gilliam | Fr |
| DE | 20 | Kengera Daniel | So |
| CB | 21 | Chris Westry | So |
| DB | 23 | Jared Tucker | So |
| DB | 24 | Blake McClain | Sr |
| S | 25 | Darius West | So |
| S | 27 | Mike Edwards | So |
| CB | 28 | Kei Beckham | Fr |
| CB | 29 | Derrick Baity | So |
| CB | 30 | Isaiah Brown | Fr |
| LB | 31 | Jamar Watkins | Fr |
| LB | 32 | Eli Brown | Fr |
| LB | 33 | Roland Walder | Fr |
| LB | 34 | Jordan Jones | So |
| DE | 35 | Denzil Ware | So |
| DT | 36 | Jacob Hyde | Jr |
| LB | 37 | Spencer Foy | So |
| LB | 38 | Alex Brownell | Fr |
| LB | 39 | Elijah Barnett | Fr |
| LB | 40 | Nico Firios | So |
| LB | 41 | Josh Allen | So |
| LB | 43 | Logan Blue | So |
| LB | 44 | De'Niro Laster | Jr |
| LB | 45 | Jaylin Bannerman | Fr |
| LB | 46 | Drew Schlegel | Fr |
| LB | 47 | Jordan Bonner | Fr |
| LB | 51 | Courtney Love | Jr |
| DT | 59 | Kordell Looney | Fr |
| DE | 60 | Calvin Taylor | Fr |
| DT | 69 | Matt Elam | Jr |
| DT | 77 | Naquez Pringle | Jr |
| DT | 78 | Zane Williams | Sr |
| DE | 90 | T. J. Carter | Fr |
| DE | 91 | Kevin Kirby | Fr |
| DE | 92 | Alvonte Bell | Jr |
| DT | 93 | Ja'Quize Cross | Fr |
| DT | 94 | Courtney Miggins | Sr |
| DE | 98 | Tymere Dubose | So |
| DT | 99 | Adrian Middleton | So |

Special teams

| Pos. | # | Name | Class |
|---|---|---|---|
| LS | 53 | Blake Best | Fr |
| P | 80 | Grant McKinniss | Fr |
| P | 93 | Bryan Kirshe | So |
| PR | 1 | Ryan Timmons | Sr |
| PR | 88 | Charles Walker | Jr |
| PK | 95 | Miles Butler | So |
| PK | 99 | Austin MacGinnis | Jr |
| KR | 22 | Sihiem King | So |

Head coach

- Mark Stoops

Coordinators/assistant coaches

- Eddie Gran
  Offensive coordinator/running backs
- Darin Hinshaw
  Quarterbacks coach
- Lamar Thomas
  Wide receivers
- Vince Marrow
  Tight ends
- John Schlarman
  Offensive line
- D. J. Eliot
  Defensive coordinator/linebackers
- Jimmy Brumbaugh
  Defensive line
- Steve Clinkscale
  Defensive backs

Legend

- (C) Team captain
- (S) Suspended
- (I) Ineligible
- Injured
- Redshirt

Roster
Last update: May 7, 2015

== Schedule ==
Kentucky announced its 2016 football schedule on October 29, 2015. The 2016 schedule consists of 7 home and 5 away games in the regular season. The Wildcats will host SEC foes Georgia, Mississippi State, South Carolina, and Vanderbilt, and will travel to Alabama, Florida, Missouri, and Tennessee.

The team will host three out of four of its non–conference games which are against Austin Peay from the Ohio Valley Conference, New Mexico State Aggies from the Sun Belt Conference, Louisville from the Atlantic Coast Conference, and Southern Miss Golden Eagles from Conference USA.

| Date | Time | Opponent | Site | TV | Result | Attendance |
|---|---|---|---|---|---|---|
| September 3 | 7:30 p.m. | Southern Miss* | Commonwealth Stadium; Lexington, KY | ESPNU | L 35–44 | 57,230 |
| September 10 | 3:30 p.m. | at Florida | Ben Hill Griffin Stadium; Gainesville, FL (rivalry) | CBS | L 7–45 | 85,821 |
| September 17 | 4:00 p.m. | New Mexico State* | Commonwealth Stadium; Lexington, KY | SECN | W 62–42 | 49,669 |
| September 24 | 7:30 p.m. | South Carolina | Commonwealth Stadium; Lexington, KY | SECN | W 17–10 | 51,702 |
| October 1 | 7:00 p.m. | at No. 2 Alabama | Bryant–Denny Stadium; Tuscaloosa, AL | ESPN | L 6–34 | 101,821 |
| October 8 | 4:00 p.m. | Vanderbilt † | Commonwealth Stadium; Lexington, KY (rivalry) | SECN | W 20–13 | 55,030 |
| October 22 | 7:30 p.m. | Mississippi State | Commonwealth Stadium; Lexington, KY (SEC Nation) | SECN | W 40–38 | 50,414 |
| October 29 | 12:00 p.m. | at Missouri | Faurot Field; Columbia, MO | SECN | W 35–21 | 50,234 |
| November 5 | 7:30 p.m. | Georgia | Commonwealth Stadium; Lexington, KY | SECN | L 24–27 | 62,507 |
| November 12 | 12:00 p.m. | at Tennessee | Neyland Stadium; Knoxville, TN (rivalry) | SECN | L 36–49 | 101,075 |
| November 19 | 4:30 p.m. | Austin Peay* | Commonwealth Stadium; Lexington, KY | SECN | W 49–13 | 48,948 |
| November 26 | 12:00 p.m. | at No. 11 Louisville* | Papa John's Cardinal Stadium; Louisville, KY (Governor's Cup) | ESPN | W 41–38 | 54,075 |
| December 31 | 11:00 a.m. | vs. Georgia Tech* | EverBank Field; Jacksonville, FL (TaxSlayer Bowl) | ESPN | L 18–33 | 43,102 |
*Non-conference game; Rankings from AP Poll released prior to game; All times are in Eastern time

Schedule source:

== Game summaries ==
=== Southern Mississippi ===
Southern Mississippi vs. Kentucky

| Quarter | 1 | 2 | 3 | 4 | Total |
|---|---|---|---|---|---|
| Golden Eagles | 7 | 10 | 21 | 6 | 44 |
| Wildcats | 21 | 14 | 0 | 0 | 35 |

at Commonwealth Stadium, Lexington, Kentucky

- Date: September 3, 2016
- Game time: 7:32 p.m. EST
- Game weather: Temperature: 76 °F (24 °C) • Wind ENE 7 mph (11 km/h) • Weather: Sunny
- Game attendance: 57,230
- Referee: Ken Antee
- TV announcers (ESPNU): Anish Shroff (play-by-play), Ahmad Brooks (analyst)
- Game Recap

=== Florida ===
Kentucky vs. Florida

| Quarter | 1 | 2 | 3 | 4 | Total |
|---|---|---|---|---|---|
| Wildcats | 0 | 0 | 0 | 7 | 7 |
| Gators | 14 | 10 | 14 | 7 | 45 |

at Ben Hill Griffin Stadium, Gainesville, Florida

- Date: September 10, 2016
- Game time: 3:30 p.m. EST
- Game weather: Temperature: • Wind: • Weather:
- Game attendance: 85,821
- TV announcers (CBS): Verne Lundquist (play-by-play), Gary Danielson (analyst)

=== New Mexico State ===
New Mexico State vs. Kentucky

| Quarter | 1 | 2 | 3 | 4 | Total |
|---|---|---|---|---|---|
| Aggies | 21 | 14 | 7 | 0 | 42 |
| Wildcats | 14 | 21 | 14 | 13 | 62 |

at Commonwealth Stadium, Lexington, Kentucky

- Date: September 17, 2016
- Game time: 4:30 p.m. EST
- Game weather: Temperature: • Wind: • Weather:
- Game attendance: 49,669
- TV: SEC Network

=== South Carolina ===
South Carolina vs. Kentucky

| Quarter | 1 | 2 | 3 | 4 | Total |
|---|---|---|---|---|---|
| Gamecocks | 0 | 7 | 3 | 0 | 10 |
| Wildcats | 0 | 3 | 7 | 7 | 17 |

at Commonwealth Stadium, Lexington, Kentucky

- Date: September 24, 2016
- Game time: 7:30 p.m. EST
- Game weather: Temperature: • Wind: • Weather:
- Game attendance: 51,702
- TV: SEC Network

=== Alabama ===
Kentucky vs. Alabama

| Quarter | 1 | 2 | 3 | 4 | Total |
|---|---|---|---|---|---|
| Wildcats | 3 | 0 | 0 | 3 | 6 |
| #1 Crimson Tide | 3 | 14 | 14 | 3 | 34 |

at Bryant–Denny Stadium, Tuscaloosa, Alabama

- Date: October 1, 2016
- Game time: 7:00 p.m. EST
- Game weather: Temperature: • Wind: • Weather:
- Game attendance: 101,821
- TV: ESPN

=== Vanderbilt ===
Vanderbilt vs. Kentucky

| Quarter | 1 | 2 | 3 | 4 | Total |
|---|---|---|---|---|---|
| Commodores | 3 | 0 | 7 | 3 | 13 |
| Wildcats | 7 | 10 | 0 | 3 | 20 |

at Commonwealth Stadium, Lexington, Kentucky

- Date: October 8, 2016
- Game time: 4:00 p.m. EST
- Game weather: Temperature: • Wind: • Weather:
- Game attendance: 55,030
- TV: SEC Network

=== Mississippi State ===
Mississippi State vs. Kentucky

| Quarter | 1 | 2 | 3 | 4 | Total |
|---|---|---|---|---|---|
| Bulldogs | 0 | 14 | 10 | 14 | 38 |
| Wildcats | 0 | 6 | 21 | 13 | 40 |

at Commonwealth Stadium, Lexington, Kentucky

- Date: October 22, 2016
- Game time: 7:30pm EST
- Game weather: Temperature: • Wind: • Weather:
- Game attendance: 50,414
- TV: SEC Network

=== Missouri ===
Kentucky vs. Missouri

| Quarter | 1 | 2 | 3 | 4 | Total |
|---|---|---|---|---|---|
| Wildcats | 7 | 14 | 7 | 7 | 35 |
| Tigers | 0 | 7 | 0 | 14 | 21 |

at Faurot Field, Columbia, Missouri

- Date: October 29, 2016
- Game time: 12:00 NOON EST
- Game weather: Temperature: • Wind: • Weather:
- Game attendance: 50,234
- TV: SEC Network

=== Georgia ===
Georgia vs. Kentucky

| Quarter | 1 | 2 | 3 | 4 | Total |
|---|---|---|---|---|---|
| Bulldogs | 7 | 6 | 3 | 11 | 27 |
| Wildcats | 7 | 7 | 7 | 3 | 24 |

at Commonwealth Stadium, Lexington, Kentucky

- Date: November 5, 2016
- Game time: 7:30 p.m. EST
- Game weather: Temperature: • Wind: • Weather:
- Game attendance: 62,507
- TV: SEC Network

=== Tennessee ===
Kentucky vs. Tennessee

| Quarter | 1 | 2 | 3 | 4 | Total |
|---|---|---|---|---|---|
| Wildcats | 10 | 3 | 3 | 20 | 36 |
| Volunteers | 14 | 7 | 14 | 14 | 49 |

at Neyland Stadium, Knoxville, Tennessee

- Date: November 12, 2016
- Game time: 12:00 NOON EST
- Game weather: Temperature: • Wind: • Weather:
- Game attendance: 101,075
- TV: SEC Network

=== Austin Peay ===
Austin Peay vs. Kentucky

| Quarter | 1 | 2 | 3 | 4 | Total |
|---|---|---|---|---|---|
| Governors | 7 | 6 | 0 | 0 | 13 |
| Wildcats | 0 | 21 | 21 | 7 | 49 |

at Commonwealth Stadium, Lexington, Kentucky

- Date: November 19, 2016
- Game time: 4:30 p.m. EST
- Game weather: Temperature: • Wind: • Weather:
- Game attendance: 48,948
- TV: SEC Network

=== Louisville ===
Kentucky Wildcats at #11 Louisville Cardinals

| Quarter | 1 | 2 | 3 | 4 | Total |
|---|---|---|---|---|---|
| Wildcats | 14 | 7 | 10 | 10 | 41 |
| #11 Cardinals | 7 | 17 | 7 | 7 | 38 |

at Papa John's Cardinal Stadium • Louisville, Kentucky

- Date: November 26, 2016
- Game time: 12:00 p.m. EST
- TV announcers (ESPN): Mike Patrick (play-by-play), Ed Cunningham (color), Dr. Jerry Punch (sideline)

Game information

First Quarter

- (12:57) LOU TD: Lamar Jackson 19-yard rush (Blanton Creque PAT).
- (12:39) UK TD: Stephen Johnson 75-yard pass to Garrett Johnson (Austin MacGinnis PAT).
- (4:07) UK TD: Stanley Williams 36-yard rush (Austin MacGinnis PAT).

Second Quarter

- (14:54) LOU TD: Lamar Jackson 18-yard pass to Reggie Bonnafon (Blanton Creque PAT).
- (8:13) LOU FG: Blanton Creque 19-yard field goal.
- (3:09) LOU TD: Lamar Jackson 24-yard pass to Cole Hikutini (Blanton Creque PAT).
- (2:13) UK TD: Stephen Johnson 63-yard pass to Garrett Johnson (Austin MacGinnis PAT).

Third Quarter

- (10:58) UK TD: Benny Snell 18-yard rush (Austin MacGinnis PAT).
- (9:19) LOU TD: Jeremy Smith 3-yard rush (Blanton Creque PAT).
- (2:43) UK FG: Austin MacGinnis 35-yard field goal.

Fourth Quarter

- (14:19) UK TD: Stephen Johnson 35-yard pass to Dorian Baker (Austin MacGinnis PAT).
- (7:44) LOU TD: Lamar Jackson 1-yard rush (Blanton Creque PAT).
- (0:12) UK FG: Austin MacGinnis 47-yard field goal.

Top Passers

- UK – Stephen Johnson: 16/27, 338 yds, 3 TD, 1 INT
- LOU – Lamar Jackson: 16/25, 281 yds, 2 TD, 3 INT

Top Rushers

- UK – Stephen Johnson: 8 att, 83 yds
- LOU – Lamar Jackson: 25 att, 171 yds, 2 TD

Top Receiving

- UK – Garrett Johnson: 5 rec, 164 yds, 2 TD
- LOU – Cole Hikutini: 7 rec, 100 yds, 1 TD

=== Georgia Tech ===
Georgia Tech Yellow Jackets vs Kentucky Wildcats

| Quarter | 1 | 2 | 3 | 4 | Total |
|---|---|---|---|---|---|
| Yellow Jackets | 10 | 10 | 3 | 10 | 33 |
| Wildcats | 0 | 3 | 0 | 15 | 18 |

at EverBank Field • Jacksonville, Florida

- Date: December 31, 2016
- Game time: 11:00 a.m. EST
- TV: ESPN
