= 2016 TaxSlayer Bowl (December) =

2016 Gator Bowl
- 72nd Gator Bowl
Georgia Tech Yellow Jackets	Kentucky Wildcats
(8–4)	(7–5)
ACC	SEC
33	18
Head coach: Paul Johnson	Head coach: Mark Stoops
	1	2	3	4	Total
Georgia Tech	10	10	3	10	33
Kentucky	0	3	0	15	18
- Date: December 31, 2016
- Season: 2016
- Stadium: EverBank Field
- Location: Jacksonville, Florida
- MVP: Dedrick Mills (RB, Georgia Tech) & Stephen Johnson II (QB, Kentucky)
- Favorite: Georgia Tech by 4
- Referee: Reggie Smith (Big XII)
- Attendance: 43,102
- Payout: US$2,750,000

United States TV coverage
- Network: ESPN
- Announcers: Mark Jones (play-by-play); Rod Gilmore (color); Quint Kessenich (sidelines)

The 2016 TaxSlayer Gator Bowl was a post-season American college football bowl game played on December 31, 2016, at EverBank Field in Jacksonville, Florida. The 72nd edition of the Gator Bowl featured the Georgia Tech Yellow Jackets of the Atlantic Coast Conference against the Kentucky Wildcats of the Southeastern Conference. It began at 11 a.m. EST and aired on ESPN. It was one of the 2016–17 bowl games concluding the 2016 FBS football season. The game's naming rights sponsor was tax preparation software company TaxSlayer.com, and for sponsorship reasons was officially known as the TaxSlayer Bowl.

== Teams ==
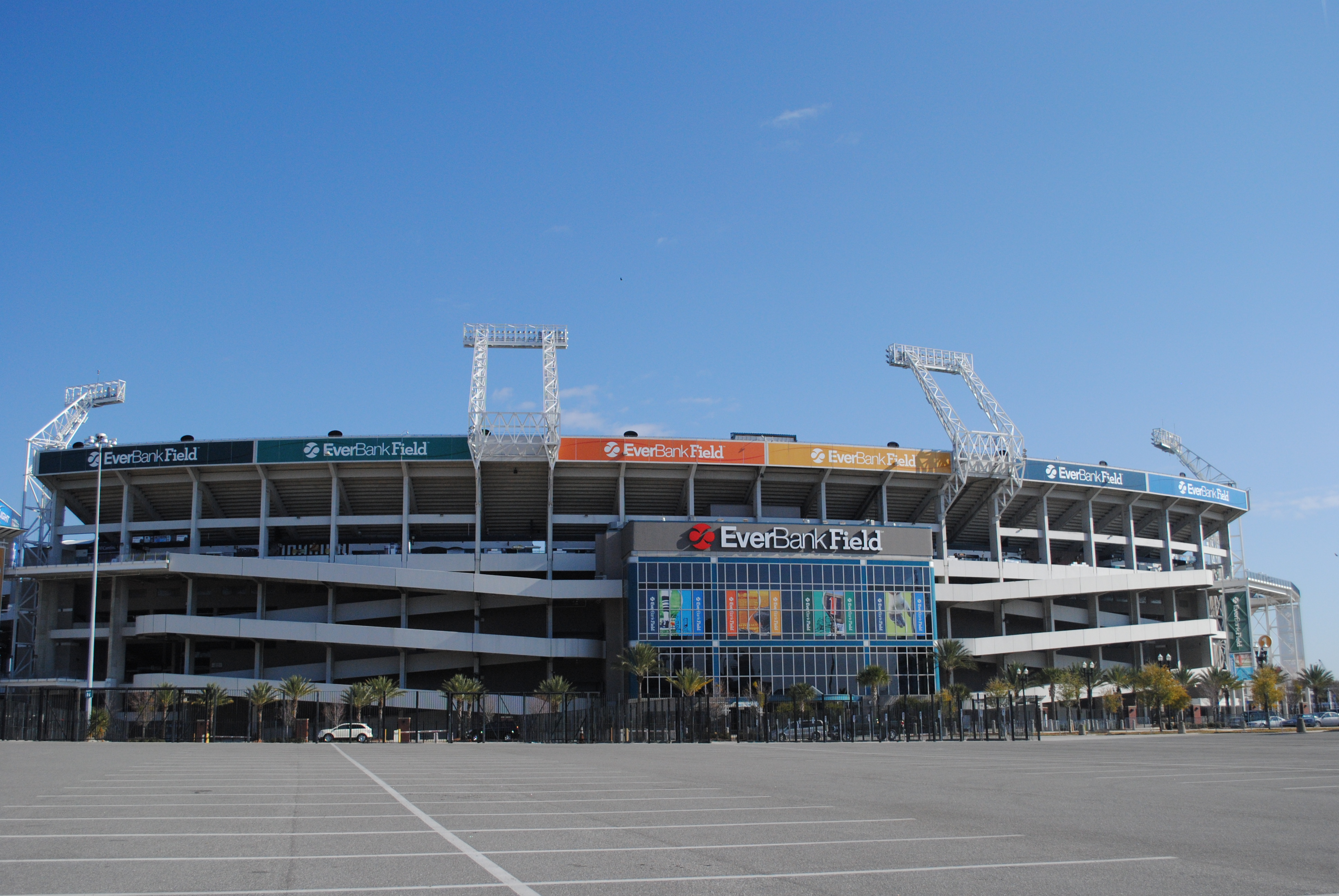
The 2016 TaxSlayer Bowl was played at EverBank Field

This was the 20th overall meeting between the two teams, with Georgia Tech holding an 11–7–1 series lead coming into the game. The previous time the two teams met was in 1960, when both teams were members of the Southeastern Conference. In that game, Georgia Tech beat Kentucky 23–13.

=== Georgia Tech ===
Georgia Tech was led by head coach Paul Johnson. The Yellow Jackets began the season 3–0, before losing three games in a row to become 3–3 halfway through the season. Georgia Tech went 5–1 the second half of the season, ending their regular season in a 28–27 victory over their rivals Georgia.

Heading into the game, the Yellow Jackets ranked 69th in the nation in scoring (27.8) and 82nd in yards per game (388.6). Georgia Tech utilized a run-heavy offense, averaging 257.4 rushing yards per game (10th in the nation) and only 131.2 passing yards per game (123rd in the nation). The team's offense was led by redshirt senior quarterback Justin Thomas, who threw for 1,454 yards and eight touchdowns and rushed for 562 yards and five touchdowns. Georgia Tech's leading rusher of Marcus Marshall, who led the team with 624 yards. Marshall transferred after Tech's regular season finale, however, and did not play in the TaxSlayer Bowl.

On defense, Georgia Tech was ranked 47th in the nation in scoring defense (25) and 63rd in yards allowed per game (408.1). The Yellow Jacket's run defense was ranked 64th in the nation, while the pass defense was ranked 73rd. The team's defense was led by defensive back Corey Griffin, who led the team with 79 tackles. Griffin also had a sack, two interceptions and a fumble recovery.

This was Georgia Tech's eighth appearance in the TaxSlayer Bowl / Gator Bowl; in their prior appearances they were 3–4. This was also the Yellow Jackets' first bowl game since the 2014 Orange Bowl.

=== Kentucky ===
Kentucky was led by head coach Mark Stoops. The Wildcats began the season 0–2 before going 5–1 in their next 6 games. They then lost back-to-back games against Georgia and Tennessee before winning their final two games of the regular season, ending the regular season in a 41–38 victory over their rivals Louisville.

Heading into the game, Kentucky was ranked 54th in the nation in scoring (31.0) and 57th in total yards (428.3). Like Georgia Tech, the Wildcats utilized a run-heavy offense, ranking 16th in the nation in rushing offense (241.3) but only 106th in passing offense (187.0). The offense was led by running backs Stanley Williams and Benny Snell, who both rushed for over 1,000 yards and combined for 20 rushing touchdowns on the season.

On defense, Kentucky was ranked 87th in the nation in scoring defense (31.2) and 88th in yards allowed per game (435.9). The Wildcats' defense struggled especially against the run, possessing the 108th ranked rushing defense and allowing an average of 225 rushing yards per game.

This was Kentucky's first bowl game since the 2011 BBVA Compass Bowl, and was their first appearance in the TaxSlayer Bowl / Gator Bowl.

== Game summary ==
=== First quarter ===
Kentucky received the opening kickoff. On the fourth play of the game, Kentucky quarterback Stephen Johnson fumbled the ball after being sacked by Georgia Tech's Patrick Gamble. Another Yellow Jackets player, P.J. Davis, recovered the fumble and returned the ball 38-yards for a touchdown, giving Georgia Tech a 7–0 lead. The following Kentucky drive stalled, giving the Yellow Jackets the ball back. On the ensuing Yellow Jackets drive, head coaches Paul Johnson and Mark Stoops got in a shouting match over Tech's blocking tactics after Kentucky players were injured on back-to-back plays. Georgia Tech was able to drive to Kentucky's red zone, but were stopped at the 5-yard line. A 23-yard Harrison Butker field goal made the score 10–0. Kentucky was in possession of the ball going into the second quarter.

=== Second quarter ===
Kentucky put its first points on the board with a 37-yard field goal, making it a 10–3 game. After forcing Georgia Tech to punt, Kentucky drove down to Georgia Tech's 5-yard line. Facing a 4th and 1 situation, Kentucky decided to go for it instead of kicking a field goal. Running back Jojo Kemp was unable to get convert, however, giving the ball back to Georgia Tech at the 6-yard line.

On the ensuing Yellow Jackets possession, Georgia Tech ran three consecutive running plays but were unable to get a first down. Facing a 4th and 1 situation at their own 15-yard line, Georgia Tech decided to go for it instead of punting the ball away. Georgia Tech's gamble paid off as they were able to gain a first down on a 3-yard run from Dedrick Mills. Georgia Tech went up 17–3 with 49 seconds in the half on a 21-yard touchdown run from Justin Thomas.

After blocking a Kentucky punt, Georgia Tech received the ball back at Kentucky's 44-yard line with 20 seconds remaining in the half. On a 4th and 10 situation, Thomas completed a 10-yard pass to Brad Stewart to Kentucky's 34-yard line to set up a 52-yard field goal attempt. Harrison Butker was able to make the field as time expired in the half, giving Georgia Tech a 20–3 lead going into halftime.

=== Third quarter ===
Georgia Tech received the kickoff in the second half, but were unable to drive past their 42-yard line, forcing the Yellow Jackets to punt. Kentucky blocked Georgia Tech's punt, giving Kentucky the ball at Georgia Tech's 28-yard line. Kentucky was unable to capitalize on the blocked punt, as a personal foul penalty pushed Kentucky back to Georgia Tech's 43-yard line. After being unable to convert for a first down, Kentucky punted the ball back to Georgia Tech. After exchanging punts, Georgia Tech went up 23–3 on a 44-yard field goal from Harrison Butker. Kentucky was in possession of the ball going into the fourth quarter.

=== Fourth quarter ===
Kentucky scored its first touchdown of the game on a 20-yard touchdown pass from Stephen Johnson to Dorian Baker, making it a 23–10 game. Georgia Tech responded with a 12 play, 68-yard drive that took 7:27 off the clock. Georgia Tech drove to Kentucky's 5-yard line, but on a 3rd and goal situation, Georgia Tech's Qua Searcy was stopped for a 3-yard loss. Harrison Butker made a 26-yard field goal to make it a 26–10 game. Kentucky responded with a 21-yard touchdown run from Stephen Johnson, making it a 26–18 game after a successful two-point conversion with 3:57 remaining in the game.

Georgia Tech recovered the ensuing onside kick at their own 42-yard line. The Yellow Jackets then ran two consecutive run plays which took only a few seconds off the clock due to Kentucky using a couple of timeouts. Facing a 3rd and 4 situation, Justin Thomas completed a 42-yard pass to Ricky Jeune, giving the Yellow Jackets a first down at Kentucky's goal line. Georgia Tech score three plays later 3-yard touchdown run from Dedrick Mills, giving Georgia Tech a 33–18 lead. The following Kentucky drive ended on downs, giving Georgia Tech the victory.

== Scoring summary ==
Scoring summary

Quarter	Time	Drive			Team	Scoring information	Score	
Quarter	Time	Plays	Yards	TOP	Team	Scoring information	GT	UK
1	13:10				GT	Fumble recovery returned 38 yards for touchdown by P.J. Davis, Harrison Butker kick good	7	0
1	3:30	12	75	6:23	GT	23-yard field goal by Harrison Butker	10	0
2	11:36	14	56	6:54	UK	37-yard field goal by Austin MacGinnis	10	3
2	0:49	11	94	4:29	GT	Justin Thomas 21-yard touchdown run, Harrison Butker kick good	17	3
2	0:00	5	10	0:24	GT	52-yard field goal by Harrison Butker	20	3
3	2:15	8	18	3:37	GT	44-yard field goal by Harrison Butker	23	3
4	13:40	12	75	3:35	UK	Dorian Baker 20-yard touchdown reception from Stephen Johnson, Austin MacGinnis kick good	23	10
4	6:13	12	68	7:27	GT	26-yard field goal by Harrison Butker	26	10
4	3:57	9	75	2:16	UK	Stephen Johnson 21-yard touchdown run, 2-point pass good (Stephen Johnson to C. J. Conrad)	26	18
4	2:18	6	58	1:39	GT	Dedrick Mills 3-yard touchdown run, Harrison Butker kick good	33	18
"TOP" = time of possession. For other American football terms, see Glossary of American football.							33	18

== Statistics ==
Statistics	GT	UK
First downs	21	20
Plays-yards	65–371	70–324
Third down efficiency	5–13	6–16
Rushes-yards	51–266	36–149
Passing yards	105	175
Passing, Comp-Att-Int	6–14–0	19–34–0
Time of Possession	32:22	27:38

Team	Category	Player	Statistics
GT	Passing	Justin Thomas	6/14, 105 yds
GT	Rushing	Dedrick Mills	31 car, 169 yds, 1 TD
GT	Receiving	Ricky Jeune	3 rec, 59 yds
UK	Passing	Stephen Johnson	19/34, 175 yds
UK	Rushing	Stephen Johnson	14 car, 49 yds, 1 TD
UK	Receiving	Dorian Baker	2 rec, 38 yds, 1 TD

Georgia Tech B-back Dedrick Mills was named the game's most valuable player. Mills rushed for a team-leading 169 yards on 31 carries, along with 1 rushing touchdown.

Georgia Tech outgained Kentucky in total yardage 371–324. Kentucky committed 1 turnover while Georgia Tech committed none. The Yellow Jackets were more efficient on third down conversions, converting 5 out of 13 attempts compared to Kentucky's 6 out of 16 attempts. Georgia Tech also converted both of its fourth down attempts, while Kentucky converted 2 out of 4 attempts.

Georgia Tech quarterback Justin Thomas completed 6 out of his 14 pass attempts for 105 yards and no touchdowns. Thomas was also Tech's second leading rusher, rushing for 42 yards on 9 attempts. The Yellow Jacket's leading receiver was Ricky Jeune, catching 3 passes for 59 yards.

Kentucky quarterback Stephen Johnson completed 19 out of his 34 pass attempts for 175 yards and 1 touchdown. Johnson also was Kentucky's leading rusher, rushing for 49 yards and 1 touchdown. Running backs Stanley Williams and Benny Snell, who had both rushed for over 1,000 yards in the regular season, were held to only 69 combined rushing yards in the game. Dorian Baker was Kentucky's leading receiver, catching 2 passes for 38 yards and 1 touchdown.
