= 2016 TaxSlayer Bowl =

2016 TaxSlayer Bowl can refer to:

- 2016 TaxSlayer Bowl (January), played as part of the 2015–16 college football bowl season between the Georgia Bulldogs and the Penn State Nittany Lions
- 2016 TaxSlayer Bowl (December), played as part of the 2016–17 college football bowl season between the Georgia Tech Yellow Jackets and the Kentucky Wildcats
