= List of Kentucky Wildcats head football coaches =

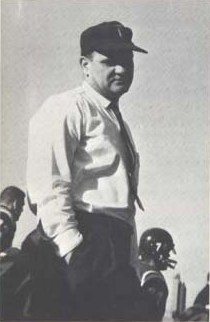
Jerry Claiborne is one of two Kentucky coaches to be inducted into the College Football Hall of Fame

The Kentucky Wildcats college football team represents the University of Kentucky in the East Division of the Southeastern Conference (SEC). The Wildcats compete as part of the NCAA Division I Football Bowl Subdivision. The program has had 37 head coaches since it began play during the 1881 season. On December 1, 2025, Will Stein was hired as Kentucky's 38th head coach.

Through the 2025 season, Kentucky has played 1,358 games over 135 seasons. Both the inaugural 1881 squad and the revived 1891 squad have unknown coaches according to university records in winning two games and losing three. Since 1892, eight coaches have led the Wildcats in postseason bowl games: Bear Bryant, Fran Curci, Jerry Claiborne, Bill Curry, Hal Mumme, Rich Brooks, Joker Phillips and Mark Stoops.

Two of those coaches also won conference championships: Bryant and Curci won a combined three as a member of the SEC.

Stoops is the leader in both seasons coached, with 13, and all-time wins, with 72. Fran Curci was the previous leader with 9 seasons coached. Bryant was the previous leader in games won, with 60 victories during his eight seasons with the program. Jack Wright has the highest winning percentage of those who have coached more than one game, with .875. Bernie Shively has the lowest winning percentage of those who have coached more than one game, with .200. Of the 36 different head coaches who have led the Wildcats, Bryant and Jerry Claiborne have been inducted into the College Football Hall of Fame in South Bend, Indiana.

== Key ==
Key to symbols in coaches list
General		Overall		Conference		Postseason (Note: Although the first Rose Bowl Game was played in 1902, it has been continuously played since the 1916 game, and is recognized as the oldest bowl game by the NCAA. "—" indicates any season prior to 1916 when postseason games were not played.)	
No.	Order of coaches (Note: A running total of the number of head coaches, with coaches who served separate tenures being counted only once. Interim head coaches are represented with "Int" and are not counted in the running total. "—" indicates the team played but either without a coach or no coach is on record. "X" indicates an interim year without play.)	GC	Games coached	CW	Conference wins	PW	Postseason wins
DC	Division championships	OW	Overall wins	CL	Conference losses	PL	Postseason losses
CC	Conference championships	OL	Overall losses	CT	Conference ties	PT	Postseason ties
NC	National championships	OT	Overall ties (Note: Overtime rules in college football were introduced in 1996, making ties impossible in the period since.)	C%	Conference winning percentage		
†	Elected to the College Football Hall of Fame	O%	Overall winning percentage (Note: When computing the win–loss percentage, a tie counts as half a win and half a loss.)				

== Coaches ==
List of head football coaches showing season(s) coached, overall records, conference records, postseason records, championships and selected awards (Note: Statistics correct as of the end of the 2025 NCAA Division I FBS football season.)
No.	Name	Term	Season(s)	GC	OW	OL	OT	O%	CW	CL	CT	C%	PW	PL	PT	DC (Note: Divisional champions have advanced to the SEC Championship Game since the institution of divisional play beginning in the 1992 season. Since that time, Kentucky has competed as a member of the East Division of the SEC.)	CC	NC	Awards
1	A. M. Miller	1892	1	7	2	4	1	0.357	—	—	—	—	—	—	—	—	—	0	—
2	John A. Thompson	1893	1	8	5	2	1	0.687	—	—	—	—	—	—	—	—	—	0	—
3	W. P. Finney	1894	1	7	5	2	0	0.714	—	—	—	—	—	—	—	—	—	0	—
4	Charles B. Mason	1895	1	9	4	5	0	0.444	—	—	—	—	—	—	—	—	—	0	—
5	Dudley Short	1896	1	9	3	6	0	0.333	—	—	—	—	—	—	—	—	—	0	—
6	Lyman Eaton	1897	1	6	2	4	0	0.333	—	—	—	—	—	—	—	—	—	0	—
7	W. R. Bass	1898–1899	2	16	12	2	2	0.813	—	—	—	—	—	—	—	—	—	0	—
8	William H. Kiler	1900–1901	2	19	6	12	1	0.342	—	—	—	—	—	—	—	—	—	0	—
9	E. W. McLeod	1902	1	9	3	5	1	0.389	—	—	—	—	—	—	—	—	—	0	—
10	Jack Wright	1903	1	8	7	1	0	0.875	—	—	—	—	—	—	—	—	—	0	—
11	Fred Schacht	1904–1905	2	20	15	4	1	0.775	—	—	—	—	—	—	—	—	—	0	—
12	J. White Guyn	1906–1908	3	25	17	7	1	0.700	1	4	1	0.250	—	—	—	—	0	0	—
13	Edwin Sweetland	1909–1910; 1912	2, 1	28	23	5	0	0.821	4	0	0	1.000	—	—	—	—	0	0	—
14	Prentiss Douglass	1911	1	10	7	3	0	0.700	1	1	0	0.500	—	—	—	—	0	0	—
15	Alpha Brumage	1913–1914	2	16	11	5	0	0.688	1	2	0	0.333	—	—	—	—	0	0	—
16	John J. Tigert	1915–1916	2	15	10	2	3	0.767	3	2	3	0.563	—	—	—	—	0	0	—
17	Stanley A. Boles	1917	1	9	3	5	1	0.389	1	5	0	0.167	0	0	0	—	0	0	—
18	Andrew Gill	1918–1919	2	11	5	5	1	0.500	4	2	1	0.643	0	0	0	—	0	0	—
19	William Juneau	1920–1922	3	25	13	10	2	0.560	3	8	2	0.308	0	0	0	—	0	0	—
20	Jack Winn	1923	1	9	4	3	2	0.556	0	2	2	0.250	0	0	0	—	0	0	—
21	Fred J. Murphy	1924–1926	3	27	12	14	1	0.463	7	9	1	0.441	0	0	0	—	0	0	—
22	Harry Gamage	1927–1933	7	62	32	25	5	0.556	21	23	4	0.479	0	0	0	—	0	0	—
23	Chet A. Wynne	1934–1937	4	39	20	19	0	0.513	5	14	0	0.236	0	0	0	—	0	0	—
24	A. D. Kirwan	1938–1944	7	56	24	28	4	0.464	4	22	3	0.190	0	0	0	—	0	0	—
25	Bernie Shively	1945	1	10	2	8	0	0.200	0	5	0	.000	0	0	0	—	0	0	—
26	Bear Bryant^{†}	1946–1953	8	88	60	23	5	0.710	25	19	4	0.563	3	1	0	—	1	1	AP SEC Coach of the Year (1950)
27	Blanton Collier	1954–1961	8	80	41	36	3	0.531	21	34	3	0.388	0	0	0	—	0	0	SEC Coach of the Year (1954)
28	Charlie Bradshaw	1962–1968	7	70	25	41	4	0.386	11	25	2	0.316	0	0	0	—	0	0	—
29	John Ray	1969–1972	4	43	10	33	0	0.233	4	24	0	0.143	0	0	0	—	0	0	—
30	Fran Curci	1973–1981	9	100	47	51	2	0.480	25	30	0	0.455	1	0	0	—	2	0	AP SEC Coach of the Year (1977)
31	Jerry Claiborne^{†}	1982–1989	8	90	41	46	3	0.472	13	37	0	0.260	1	1	0	—	0	0	AP SEC Coach of the Year (1983)
32	Bill Curry	1990–1996	7	78	26	52	0	0.333	14	40	0	0.259	0	1	0	0	0	0	—
33	Hal Mumme	1997–2000	4	46	20	26	—	0.435	10	22	—	0.313	0	2	0	0	0	0	—
34	Guy Morriss	2001–2002	2	23	9	14	—	0.391	4	12	—	0.250	0	0	0	0	0	0	—
35	Rich Brooks	2003–2009	7	86	39	47	—	0.453	16	39	—	0.291	3	1	0	0	0	0	—
36	Joker Phillips	2010–2012	3	37	13	24	—	0.351	4	20	—	0.167	0	1	0	0	0	0	—
37	Mark Stoops	2013–2025	13	152	72	80	—	0.474	38	68	—	0.358	4	3	0	0	0	0	AP SEC Coach of the Year (2018)
38	Will Stein	2026–present	1	0	0	0	—	–	0	0	—	–	0	0	0	0	0	0	—
