= Mark Stoops =

American football player and coach (born 1967)

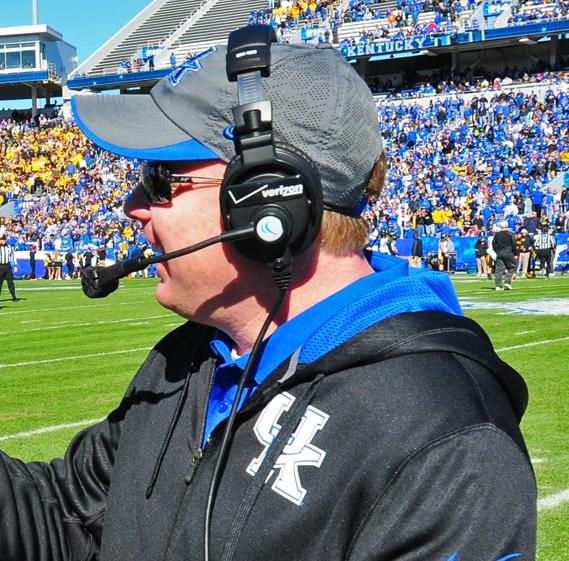
- Stoops at Kroger Field in 2013

Current position
- Title: Special assistant
- Team: Texas
- Conference: SEC

Biographical details
- Born: July 9, 1967 (age 59); Youngstown, Ohio, U.S.

Playing career
- 1986–1988: Iowa
- Position: Defensive back

Coaching career (HC unless noted)
- 1990–1991: Iowa (GA)
- 1992–1995: Nordonia HS (OH) (AD/DB)
- 1996: South Florida (DB)
- 1997–1999: Wyoming (DB)
- 2000: Houston (co-DC/S)
- 2001–2003: Miami (FL) (DB)
- 2004–2009: Arizona (DC/DB)
- 2010–2012: Florida State (DC/DB)
- 2013–2025: Kentucky
- 2026–present: Texas (Special assistant)

Head coaching record
- Overall: 72–80 (.474)
- Bowls: 4–4 (.500)

Accomplishments and honors

Awards
- SEC Coach of the Year (2018)

Mark Thomas Stoops (born July 9, 1967) is an American college football coach and former player who is the special assistant to the head coach at the University of Texas. He most recently served as head football coach for the University of Kentucky from 2013 to 2025. Stoops is the all-time winningest head coach in the history of the Kentucky football program, surpassing former coach Paul "Bear" Bryant.

== Early life ==
Stoops, one of six children born to Ron and Evelyn "Dee Dee" Stoops, attended Cardinal Mooney High School in Youngstown, Ohio, where his father was an assistant coach and defensive coordinator. He is the brother of former Oklahoma head coach Bob Stoops and former Arizona head coach Mike Stoops.

After graduating from high school, Stoops played college football for the Iowa Hawkeyes from 1986 to 1988.

== Coaching career ==
Stoops was a graduate assistant coach at Iowa from 1989 to 1991. He later became the athletic director and defensive backs coach at Nordonia High School in Macedonia, Ohio (1992–1995).

In 1996, Stoops was the defensive backs coach for South Florida.

Stoops served as the defensive backs coach for the University of Wyoming Cowboys from 1997 to 1999.

At Wyoming, Stoops served under head coach Dana Dimel. When Dimel was hired at the University of Houston, he took Stoops with him to join the Cougars as co-defensive coordinator (along with Dick Bumpas) and safeties coach in 2000.

=== Miami (FL) ===
In February 2001, Stoops was named the defensive backs coach for the University of Miami Hurricanes, replacing Chuck Pagano, who left to go to the Cleveland Browns.

=== Arizona ===
Mark's brother, Mike, was hired as the head coach of the Arizona Wildcats for the 2004 season. Mike later hired Mark as part of his staff.

=== Florida State ===
On December 11, 2009, Stoops accepted the job as defensive coordinator at Florida State University.

While at Florida State, Stoops played against his brother Oklahoma head coach Bob Stoops in 2011.

=== Kentucky ===
On November 27, 2012, Stoops was hired as the new head coach of the University of Kentucky football program, replacing former head coach Joker Phillips, who was fired after a 2–10 season. In Stoops' first season as the Kentucky Head coach, he went 2–10, followed by back to back 5–7 seasons.

In 2014, Stoops signed a contract extension that would last until 2019.

After a 0–2 start to the 2016 season, Stoops led the Wildcats to a 7–6 finish after that start and defeated their in-state rival, the eleventh-ranked Louisville Cardinals 41–38. Kentucky lost in the TaxSlayer Bowl to Georgia Tech 33–18.

The 2017 season featured ups and downs and the breakout of star running back Benny Snell. On October 28, Stoops led Kentucky to a 29–26 defeat of Tennessee. The victory over the Volunteers marked the first for Kentucky since 2011 and only the second time since 1984. The team finished with a 7–5 record in the regular season, losing afterwards in the Music City Bowl to Northwestern 24–23.

The 2018 season was a historic one for the Wildcats. Paced by Snell on offense and Josh Allen on defense, they snapped a 31-year losing streak to Florida, finishing 9-3–only the fourth time in school history that the Wildcats have won at least nine games. Kentucky defeated Penn State in the Citrus Bowl on January 1, 2019, giving the Wildcats their first 10-win season since 1977, and only their third in school history. Stoops was named SEC Coach of the Year, the first time a Kentucky coach had won the award since Jerry Claiborne in 1983.

The 2019 season was one of overcoming adversity. After a 2–3 start in which they lost all of their quarterbacks to injury, Kentucky turned to wide receiver Lynn Bowden Jr. to take over at quarterback. With a revamped offense focused on the running game, the Wildcats finished the regular season with a 7–5 record routing Louisville 45–13 on Senior Day. Kentucky capped the season with a thrilling win over Virginia Tech in the Belk Bowl, as the Wildcats scored the winning touchdown with 15 seconds remaining for an 8–5 finish.

The 2020 season, affected by the COVID-19 pandemic, saw Kentucky play a 10-game, All-SEC regular-season schedule. The high point was a 34–7 win at Tennessee, their first win in Knoxville since 1984. Despite a 4–6 record, Kentucky was still invited to a bowl game, specifically the 2021 Gator Bowl against No. 24 NC State. Stoops led Kentucky to victory in the Gator Bowl 23–21, making it three straight bowl victories for the team.

The 2021 season was marked by key transfer arrivals for both sides of the ball: quarterback Will Levis and wide receiver Wan'Dale Robinson on offense and linebacker Jacquez Jones on defense. The aforementioned players' impact was significant; the offense scored 33.3 points per game while the defense allowed 22.1 points per game. The improved play from both offense and defense led to a 9–3 regular-season record, including a 20–13 home win against Florida. Stoops lead Kentucky to a 20–17 victory over Iowa in the 2022 Citrus Bowl, giving the team its second 10–3 record since 2018, second Citrus Bowl victory in four years and fourth straight bowl victory. The fourth consecutive bowl victory for Kentucky marked the longest streak in school history.

The 2022 season marked Stoops' 10th season as head coach, becoming the football program's longest-tenured head coach in its history. Kentucky's Week 1 37–13 victory over Miami (OH) gave Stoops his 60th victory as head coach, tying Bear Bryant for the most in program history. He became Kentucky's all-time winningest football coach after beating the Florida Gators on the road 26–16 in Week 2. Kentucky struggled through the season, finishing with a 7–5 record. Kentucky was invited to the Music City Bowl, playing against Iowa for the second consecutive year. With starting quarterback Levis sitting out of the bowl game, Kentucky was shut out by Iowa 21–0. The shutout loss ended Kentucky's streak of bowl victories at four.

Stoops signed a contract extension on November 18, 2022, which would keep him in Lexington through the 2030 season.

In the 2023 season, Stoops led Kentucky to a 7–6 season, this season's star was transfer running back Ray Davis who totaled up 1452 all-purpose yards and 21 total touchdowns for the Wildcats, however this season ended in a 38–35 loss to Clemson in the Gator Bowl.

In the 2024 season, Stoops led Kentucky to a 4–8 season, ending in a 41–14 loss to Louisville in the Governors Cup.

In the 2025 season, Stoops led Kentucky to a 5–7 season. Kentucky ended its season with a 41–0 loss to Louisville, and the Wildcats missed a bowl game in back-to-back seasons for the first time since 2014–15, which were Stoops' second and third seasons.

On December 1, 2025, Kentucky fired Stoops after a second consecutive losing season.

=== Texas ===
On March 2, 2026, Stoops was hired by Texas as a special assistant to head coach Steve Sarkisian.

== Personal life ==
Stoops is the younger brother of former Oklahoma head coach Bob Stoops, former Arizona head coach and current Ole Miss assistant Mike Stoops, and Ron Jr., the oldest of the brothers, who was an assistant coach at Youngstown State. Stoops and his wife Chantel have two sons, Will and Zach. On January 4, 2021, the couple announced that they will be divorcing. Stoops also has a nephew named Drake Stoops who played wide receiver at Oklahoma.

== Head coaching record ==
Year	Team	Overall	Conference	Standing	Bowl/playoffs	Coaches^{#}	AP^{°}
Kentucky Wildcats (Southeastern Conference) (2013–2025)
2013	Kentucky	2–10	0–8	7th (Eastern)			
2014	Kentucky	5–7	2–6	6th (Eastern)			
2015	Kentucky	5–7	2–6	T–4th (Eastern)			
2016	Kentucky	7–6	4–4	T–2nd (Eastern)	L TaxSlayer		
2017	Kentucky	7–6	4–4	T–3rd (Eastern)	L Music City		
2018	Kentucky	10–3	5–3	T–2nd (Eastern)	W Citrus	11	12
2019	Kentucky	8–5	3–5	T–4th (Eastern)	W Belk		
2020	Kentucky	5–6	4–6	4th (Eastern)	W Gator		
2021	Kentucky	0–3 (10–3)*	0–3 (5–3)*	2nd (Eastern)	W Citrus*	15	18
2022	Kentucky	7–6	3–5	T–4th (Eastern)	L Music City		
2023	Kentucky	7–6	3–5	T–4th (Eastern)	L Gator		
2024	Kentucky	4–8	1–7	15th			
2025	Kentucky	5–7	2–6	T–11th			
Kentucky:		72–80*	38–68*				
Total:		72–80					
^{#}Rankings from final Coaches Poll.; ^{°}Rankings from final AP Poll.

- The team was required to vacate all 10 wins from the 2021 season due to playing ineligible players
