= T. J. Carter (defensive lineman) =

American football player (born 1998)

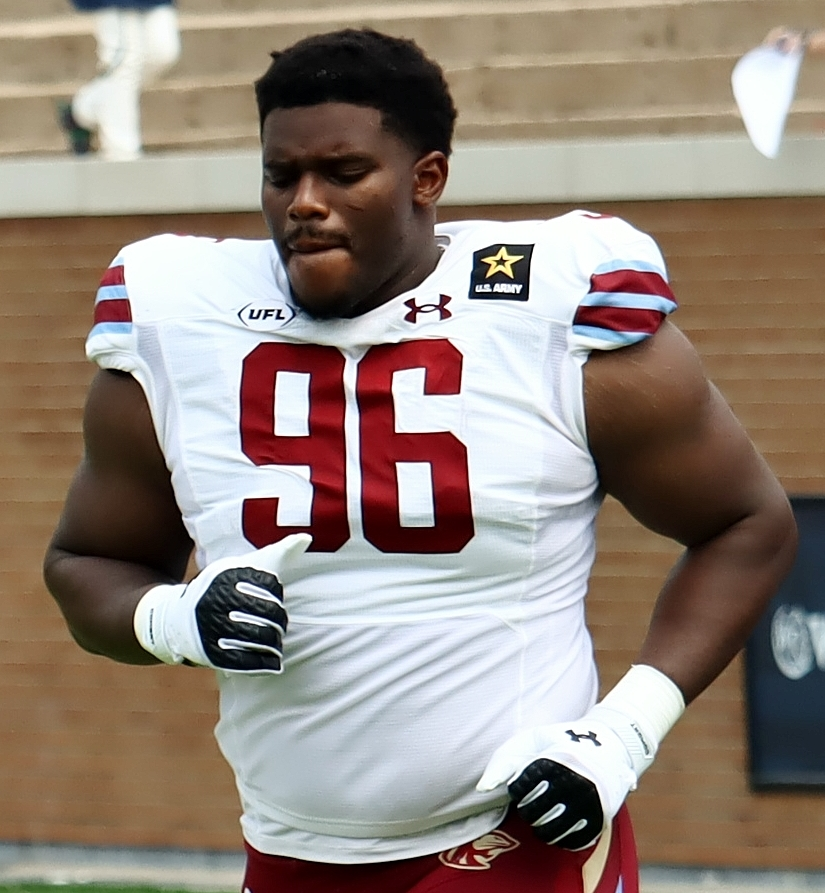
- Carter with the Michigan Panthers in 2024

Profile
- Position: Defensive tackle

Personal information
- Born: September 15, 1998 (age 28); Atlanta, Georgia, U.S.
- Listed height: 6 ft 3 in (1.91 m)
- Listed weight: 301 lb (137 kg)

Career information
- High school: Whitefield Academy (GA)
- College: Kentucky (2016–2019)
- NFL draft: 2020: undrafted

Career history
- Arizona Cardinals (2020)*; New Orleans Saints (2020)*; Pittsburgh Steelers (2021)*; Michigan Panthers (2022); New Orleans Saints (2022)*; Los Angeles Rams (2022–2023); Michigan Panthers (2024); Arizona Cardinals (2024)*; Michigan Panthers (2025); Birmingham Stallions (2026)
- * Offseason or practice squad member only

Career NFL statistics as of 2023
- Games played: 2
- Stats at Pro Football Reference

T. J. Carter (born September 15, 1998) is an American professional football defensive tackle. He played college football at Kentucky and was signed by the Arizona Cardinals as an undrafted free agent in 2020. He also spent time with the New Orleans Saints, Pittsburgh Steelers, and Los Angeles Rams.

== Early life and education ==
Carter was born on September 15, 1998, in Atlanta, Georgia. He attended Whitefield Academy and played football in all four of his years at the school, three as a starter. He played defensive end and offensive tackle, and as a senior was named first-team All-South Region 6-A and first-team All-Cobb County. After graduating, Carter, a two-star recruit, announced his commitment to Kentucky over Wyoming, Samford and Memphis.

As a true freshman at Kentucky in 2016, Carter appeared in 11 games and recorded 11 tackles. As a sophomore, he became starter, appearing in all 13 games while posting 18 tackles and three sacks. In his junior season, Carter returned to a backup role, only starting four games, recording 16 tackles. As a senior, he started 12 matches and recorded a total of 26 tackles, along with two sacks. Carter finished his time at Kentucky with 50 games played, 28 as a starter, and 71 tackles, along with six sacks and 12 TFLs. 247Sports ranked him as the 55th best Kentucky player during the Mark Stoops era.

== Professional career ==
Pre-draft measurables
Height	Weight	Arm length	Hand span	Wingspan
6 ft 3 1/2 in (1.92 m)	279 lb (127 kg)	33 5/8 in (0.85 m)	9 7/8 in (0.25 m)	6 ft 10 1/8 in (2.09 m)
All values from Pro Day

=== Arizona Cardinals ===
After going unselected in the 2020 NFL draft, Carter was signed by the Arizona Cardinals as an undrafted free agent. He was released on July 26.

=== New Orleans Saints ===
Near the end of August, Carter was signed by the New Orleans Saints, but was later released on September 5 as part of the final roster cuts.

=== Pittsburgh Steelers ===
In April 2021, he was signed by the Pittsburgh Steelers. He made only one tackle in preaseason, and was released as part of roster cuts on August 28, 2021.

=== Michigan Panthers ===
Carter was selected in the 24th round of the 2022 USFL draft by the Michigan Panthers, the first defensive tackle selected. He appeared in nine games for the Panthers, missing only one, and posted 24 tackles along with 2.5 sacks.

=== New Orleans Saints (second stint) ===
After the USFL season ended, Carter was signed back into the NFL by the New Orleans Saints on August 9, 2022, becoming the fourth Panther to receive an NFL contract. He was released six days later.

=== Los Angeles Rams ===
On August 16, 2022, Carter was claimed off waivers by the Los Angeles Rams. Carter was waived at the Rams' final roster cuts, and was afterwards re-signed as a member of the practice squad. He was elevated to the active roster for their Week 13 game against the Seattle Seahawks, and made his NFL debut in the loss, appearing on six snaps. He signed a reserve/futures contract on January 9, 2023. He was waived on August 29, 2023.

=== Michigan Panthers (second stint) ===
Carter re-signed with the Michigan Panthers on October 3, 2023. His contract was terminated on August 20, 2024, to sign with an NFL team.

=== Arizona Cardinals (second stint) ===
On August 20, 2024, Carter was signed by the Arizona Cardinals. He was waived on August 27.

=== Michigan Panthers (third stint) ===
Carter re-signed with the Michigan Panthers on September 17, 2024.
