= 2016 Georgia Tech Yellow Jackets football team =

American college football season

2016 Georgia Tech Yellow Jackets football

TaxSlayer Bowl champion

TaxSlayer Bowl, W 33–18 vs. Kentucky
- Conference: Atlantic Coast Conference
- Coastal Division
- Record: 9–4 (4–4 ACC)
- Head coach: Paul Johnson (9th season)
- Offensive scheme: Flexbone triple option
- Defensive coordinator: Ted Roof (7th season)
- Base defense: Multiple 4–3
- Home stadium: Bobby Dodd Stadium

2016 Atlantic Coast Conference football standings
| | Conf. | | | Overall |
| Team | W | | L | W | | L |
|---|---|---|---|---|---|---|
Atlantic Division
| No. 1 Clemson xy$# | 7 | – | 1 | 14 | – | 1 |
| No. 21 Louisville x | 7 | – | 1 | 9 | – | 4 |
| No. 8 Florida State | 5 | – | 3 | 10 | – | 3 |
| NC State | 3 | – | 5 | 7 | – | 6 |
| Wake Forest | 3 | – | 5 | 7 | – | 6 |
| Boston College | 2 | – | 6 | 7 | – | 6 |
| Syracuse | 2 | – | 6 | 4 | – | 8 |
Coastal Division
| No. 16 Virginia Tech xy | 6 | – | 2 | 10 | – | 4 |
| North Carolina | 5 | – | 3 | 8 | – | 5 |
| No. 20 Miami (FL) | 5 | – | 3 | 9 | – | 4 |
| Pittsburgh | 5 | – | 3 | 8 | – | 5 |
| Georgia Tech | 4 | – | 4 | 9 | – | 4 |
| Duke | 1 | – | 7 | 4 | – | 8 |
| Virginia | 1 | – | 7 | 2 | – | 10 |
Championship: Clemson 42, Virginia Tech 35
# – College Football Playoff champion; $ – Conference champion; x – Division champion/co-champions; y – Championship game participant; Rankings from AP Poll

The 2016 Georgia Tech Yellow Jackets football team represented the Georgia Institute of Technology in the 2016 NCAA Division I FBS football season. The Yellow Jackets were led by ninth-year head coach Paul Johnson and played their home games at Bobby Dodd Stadium. They were a member of the Coastal Division in the Atlantic Coast Conference.

== Preseason ==
Georgia Tech ended the 2015 season with a 3–9 overall record, 1–7 in the ACC. The Yellow Jackets finished last in the Coastal Division. Georgia Tech is picked to finished 6th in the Coastal Division, with Duke in 5th and Virginia in last.

=== Coaching staff ===
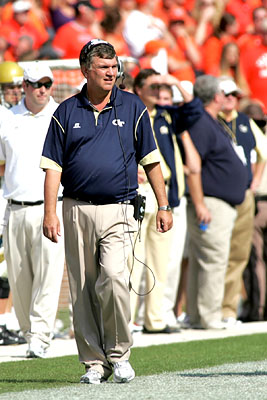
Head Coach Paul Johnson

| Name | Position | Seasons at Georgia Tech | Alma mater |
|---|---|---|---|
| Paul Johnson | Head Coach | 9 | Western Carolina (1979) |
| Bryan Cook | Quarterbacks/B-Backs | 4 | Ithaca (1998) |
| Lamar S. Owens Jr. | A-Backs/special teams coordinator | 9 | Maryland (2008) |
| Al Preston | Wide Receivers | 9 | Hawai'i (1982) |
| Mike Sewak | Offensive line | 9 | Virginia (1981) |
| Ted Roof | Defensive Coordinator/linebackers | 4 | Georgia Tech (1986) |
| Andy McCollum | Safeties/Recruiting Coordinator | 7 | Austin Peay State (1981) |
| Mike Pelton | Defensive line | 4 | Auburn (1999) |
| Joe Speed | Cornerbacks | 7 | Navy (1996) |
| Ron West | Co-offensive Line Coach | 1 | Clemson (1979) |

=== Recruiting ===
National Signing Day was February 3, 2016. The Yellow Jackets signed a total of 18 players in their 2016 recruiting class.

College recruiting
| Name | Hometown | School | Height | Weight | 40^{‡} | Commit date |
|---|---|---|---|---|---|---|
| Jordan Woods; DE | Citra, Florida | North Marion H.S. | 6 ft 3 in (1.91 m) | 250 lb (110 kg) | – | Jan 25, 2016 |
| Jordan Woods; DE | Recruit ratings: Scout: Rivals: 247Sports: | | | | | |
| Brandon Adams; DT | Brentwood, Tennessee | Brentwood Academy | 6 ft 2 in (1.88 m) | 300 lb (140 kg) | — | Jan 24, 2016 |
| Brandon Adams; DT | Recruit ratings: Scout: Rivals: 247Sports: | | | | | |
| Parker Braun; OL | Hallsville, Texas | Hallsville H.S. | 6 ft 3 in (1.91 m) | 272 lb (123 kg) | — | Aug 29, 2015 |
| Parker Braun; OL | Recruit ratings: Scout: Rivals: 247Sports: | | | | | |
| Emanuel Bridges; LB | Newman, Georgia | Newman H.S. | 6 ft 1 in (1.85 m) | 208 lb (94 kg) | — | Aug 6, 2015 |
| Emanuel Bridges; LB | Recruit ratings: Scout: Rivals: 247Sports: | | | | | |
| Jarret Cole; DB | Norcross, Georgia | Norcross H.S. | 5 ft 10 in (1.78 m) | 185 lb (84 kg) | — | Jul 30, 2015 |
| Jarret Cole; DB | Recruit ratings: Scout: Rivals: 247Sports: | | | | | |
| Steve Dolphus; WR | Malcom, Georgia | Westside H.S. | 6 ft 5 in (1.96 m) | 200 lb (91 kg) | — | Oct 21, 2015 |
| Steve Dolphus; WR | Recruit ratings: Scout: Rivals: 247Sports: | | | | | |
| Xavier Gantt; ATH | Buford, Georgia | Buford H.S. | 5 ft 10 in (1.78 m) | 175 lb (79 kg) | — | Feb 11, 2015 |
| Xavier Gantt; ATH | Recruit ratings: Scout: Rivals: 247Sports: | | | | | |
| Lucas Johnson; QB | San Diego, California | Mt Carmel H.S. | 6 ft 3 in (1.91 m) | 185 lb (84 kg) | — | Jan 25, 2016 |
| Lucas Johnson; QB | Recruit ratings: Scout: Rivals: 247Sports: | | | | | |
| Jay Jones; ATH | McCalla, Alabama | McAdory H.S. | 6 ft 0 in (1.83 m) | 180 lb (82 kg) | — | Jan 16, 2016 |
| Jay Jones; ATH | Recruit ratings: Scout: Rivals: 247Sports: | | | | | |
| Chris Martin; DT | Loganville, Georgia | Grayson H.S. | 6 ft 2 in (1.88 m) | 250 lb (110 kg) | — | May 9, 2015 |
| Chris Martin; DT | Recruit ratings: Scout: Rivals: 247Sports: | | | | | |
| Dedrick Mills; RB | Waycross, Georgia | Ware County H.S. | 5 ft 10 in (1.78 m) | 220 lb (100 kg) | — | May 27, 2015 |
| Dedrick Mills; RB | Recruit ratings: Scout: Rivals: 247Sports: | | | | | |
| Desmond Branch; DE | Athens, Texas | Trinity Valley Community College | 6 ft 4 in (1.93 m) | 265 lb (120 kg) | — | Dec 10, 2015 |
| Desmond Branch; DE | Recruit ratings: Scout: Rivals: 247Sports: | | | | | |
| Jakob Brashear; LB | Dacula, Georgia | Dacula H.S. | 6 ft 1 in (1.85 m) | 210 lb (95 kg) | — | Mar 19, 2015 |
| Jakob Brashear; LB | Recruit ratings: Scout: Rivals: 247Sports: | | | | | |
| Jalon Camp; WR | Cumming, Georgia | South Forsyth H.S. | 6 ft 2 in (1.88 m) | 210 lb (95 kg) | — | Dec 9, 2015 |
| Jalon Camp; WR | Recruit ratings: Scout: Rivals: 247Sports: | | | | | |
| Kenny Cooper; OL | Argyle, Texas | Argyle H.S. | 6 ft 3 in (1.91 m) | 285 lb (129 kg) | — | Dec 8, 2015 |
| Kenny Cooper; OL | Recruit ratings: Scout: Rivals: 247Sports: | | | | | |
| J. Hawkins-Anderson; ATH | Duluth, Georgia | Northview H.S. | 6 ft 2 in (1.88 m) | 185 lb (84 kg) | — | Dec 26, 2015 |
| J. Hawkins-Anderson; ATH | Recruit ratings: Scout: Rivals: 247Sports: | | | | | |
| Ajani Kerr; DB | Powder Springs, Georgia | McEachern H.S. | 6 ft 1 in (1.85 m) | 185 lb (84 kg) | — | Feb 2, 2016 |
| Ajani Kerr; DB | Recruit ratings: Scout: Rivals: 247Sports: | | | | | |
| Jahaziel Lee; DE | Ponchatoula, Louisiana | Ponchatoula H.S. | 6 ft 3 in (1.91 m) | 260 lb (120 kg) | — | Jan 24, 2016 |
| Jahaziel Lee; DE | Recruit ratings: Scout: Rivals: 247Sports: | | | | | |
Overall recruit ranking: Scout: 65 Rivals: 68 247Sports: 59
‡ Refers to 40-yard dash; Note: In many cases, Scout, Rivals, 247Sports, On3, and ESPN may conflict in their listings of height, weight and 40 time.; In these cases, the average was taken. ESPN grades are on a 100-point scale.; Sources: "Georgia Tech 2016 Football Commitments List". Rivals.; "2016 Team Ranking". Rivals.com.

== Schedule ==
The schedule for Georgia Tech's 2016 football season was announced on January 26, 2016.

| Date | Time | Opponent | Site | TV | Result | Attendance |
|---|---|---|---|---|---|---|
| September 3 | 7:30 am | vs. Boston College | (Republic of Ireland) Aviva Stadium; Dublin, Ireland (Aer Lingus College Football Classic) | ESPN2 | W 17–14 | 40,562 |
| September 10 | 3:00 pm | Mercer* | Bobby Dodd Stadium; Atlanta, GA | ACCN+ | W 35–10 | 49,992 |
| September 17 | 12:30 pm | Vanderbilt* | Bobby Dodd Stadium; Atlanta, GA (rivalry) | ACCN | W 38–7 | 41,916 |
| September 22 | 7:30 pm | No. 5 Clemson | Bobby Dodd Stadium; Atlanta, GA (rivalry) | ESPN | L 7–26 | 53,932 |
| October 1 | 12:00 pm | No. 14 Miami (FL) | Bobby Dodd Stadium; Atlanta, GA | ESPN2 | L 21–35 | 53,047 |
| October 8 | 12:30 pm | at Pittsburgh | Heinz Field; Pittsburgh, PA | ACCN | L 34–37 | 47,425 |
| October 15 | 12:30 pm | Georgia Southern* | Bobby Dodd Stadium; Atlanta, GA | ACCRSN | W 35–24 | 47,609 |
| October 29 | 12:00 pm | Duke^{†} | Bobby Dodd Stadium; Atlanta, GA | ACCRSN | W 38–35 | 43,886 |
| November 5 | 12:30 pm | at No. 18 North Carolina | Kenan Memorial Stadium; Chapel Hill, NC | ACCN | L 20–48 | 58,000 |
| November 12 | 3:30 pm | at No. 18 Virginia Tech | Lane Stadium; Blacksburg, VA (rivalry) | ESPNU | W 30–20 | 65,632 |
| November 19 | 12:30 pm | Virginia | Bobby Dodd Stadium; Atlanta, GA | ACCN | W 31–17 | 42,136 |
| November 26 | 12:00 pm | at Georgia* | Sanford Stadium; Athens, GA (Clean, Old-Fashioned Hate) | SECN | W 28–27 | 92,746 |
| December 31 | 11:00 am | vs. Kentucky* | EverBank Field; Jacksonville, FL (TaxSlayer Bowl) | ESPN | W 33–18 | 43,102 |
*Non-conference game; ^{†}Homecoming; Rankings from AP Poll released prior to the game; All times are in Eastern time

== Game summaries ==
=== vs Boston College ===
| | 1 | 2 | 3 | 4 | Total |
|---|---|---|---|---|---|
| Yellow Jackets | 7 | 0 | 0 | 10 | 17 |
| Eagles | 0 | 0 | 7 | 7 | 14 |

| Overall record | Previous meeting | Previous winner |
|---|---|---|
| 6–2 | 2012 | GT, 37–17 |

Trailing much of the fourth quarter 14–7, Georgia Tech surged to victory on the backs of a Harrison Butker 40-yard field goal with 4:00 left, an ensuing three and out by the Georgia Tech defense, and a crunch time 4th and 19 conversion from 5th year senior veteran Justin Thomas to Redshirt Sophomore Qua Searcy to keep hopes alive for the Jackets on their game-winning drive. Justin Thomas completed a momentous pass to Ricky Jeune, to get the Yellow Jackets into Boston College territory, and after a couple of sly runs by Thomas, Georgia Tech called a timeout at second and goal with 40 seconds left. Pitching the ball to true freshman and 19 year old Dedrick Mills, the young freshman followed a block by UGA transfer and redshirt junior JJ Green, and barreled his way over two Boston College defenders into the endzone, claiming a 17–14 lead over the home team Eagles. The game was a special opening weekend showdown, played as the "Aer Lingus Classic" in Dublin, Ireland.

=== Mercer ===
| | 1 | 2 | 3 | 4 | Total |
|---|---|---|---|---|---|
| Bears | 7 | 0 | 3 | 0 | 10 |
| Yellow Jackets | 7 | 14 | 7 | 7 | 35 |

| Overall record | Previous meeting | Previous winner |
|---|---|---|
| 15–1–1 | 1938 | GT, 19–0 |

The Georgia Tech offensive attack rushed for 364 yards against Mercer University, a team who had only been playing football for two seasons since reinstituting the Football program. Qua Searcy piled up 91 yards on the ground. Quarterback Matthew Jordan added 2 touchdowns on the ground and Marcus Marshall enjoyed 51 yards on 10 carries and a Touchdown. The Georgia Tech defense after a slow start finished the game in a positive way. Losing 7–0 to begin the game, the Tech Defense held Mercer to just a field goal the remaining three quarters, which propelled the team to victory. Overall, Tech played very positively and as it heads into conference play, it meets Vanderbilt next weekend on September 17.

=== Vanderbilt ===
| | 1 | 2 | 3 | 4 | Total |
|---|---|---|---|---|---|
| Commodores | 7 | 0 | 0 | 0 | 7 |
| Yellow Jackets | 14 | 3 | 14 | 7 | 38 |

| Overall record | Previous meeting | Previous winner |
|---|---|---|
| 19–15–3 | 2009 | GT, 56–31 |

Enjoying the team's fourth straight 2–0 start, Quarterback Justin Thomas and the Georgia Tech Yellow Jackets offense totaled over 500 yards of total offense against the Vanderbilt Commodores at Bobby Dodd Stadium in Atlanta. Thomas connected on 6 of his passes for 225 yards, including an 81-yard touchdown throw to Marcus Marshall. On the very first play of the game, Marshall took a screen in the flats and darted his way into the Vanderbilt endzone on the Yellow Jackets first play from scrimmage. The Georgia Tech defense came out strong and held Vanderbilt to just 275 yards of offense. Tech hosts #3 Clemson University on Thursday, September 22, for an ACC Showdown. Clemson, who has won three of the last four meetings between the two teams, comes in ranked the highest it ever has in a game against Georgia Tech in Atlanta at Bobby Dodd Stadium. Clemson began playing football in 1886.

=== Clemson ===
| | 1 | 2 | 3 | 4 | Total |
|---|---|---|---|---|---|
| #5 Tigers | 14 | 9 | 0 | 3 | 26 |
| Yellow Jackets | 0 | 0 | 0 | 7 | 7 |

| Overall record | Previous meeting | Previous winner |
|---|---|---|
| 50–28–2 | 2015 | CLEM, 43–24 |

The Clemson Tigers zipped off to a fast start via their star quarterback, Gainesville, Ga. native Deshaun Watson. He connected on three touchdown passes in the first half alone. When the tigers led 14–0, Lance Austin came up with a tremendous interception of a Watson pass in the endzone. When Lance attempted to the return the ball as far as possible, a teammate and Austin accidentally collided which jarred the ball out into the endzone, where Clemson was attempting to score. What seemed like a touchback for Georgia Tech, the play was controversially ruled a safety. From then, Clemson led 16–0 rather than 14–0, and ensuingly scored with 4 seconds in the half. They also added a career long 47-yard field goal by their placekicker who had missed a 27-yard field goal earlier in the game. Clemson outgained Georgia Tech 417–125. While the Georgia Tech offense struggled to pass protect star quarterback Justin Thomas, True Freshman Dedrick Mills enjoyed another outstanding performance, running for 74 yards and a touchdown, where he ran through close to four Clemson defenders and scored. Georgia Tech faces Miami on October 1, seeking its second ACC win in 2016.

=== Miami (FL) ===
| | 1 | 2 | 3 | 4 | Total |
|---|---|---|---|---|---|
| #14 Hurricanes | 7 | 21 | 7 | 0 | 35 |
| Yellow Jackets | 0 | 14 | 7 | 0 | 21 |

| Overall record | Previous meeting | Previous winner |
|---|---|---|
| 11–10 | 2015 | MIA, 38–21 |

Georgia Tech suffered two scoop and scores against the Miami (FL) Hurricanes, which resulted in a huge turnaround in the game. With Tech and the Hurricanes tied at 7–7, Justin Thomas and the Jackets were driving downfield to add another score when a crucial penalty was called on Georgia Tech, knocking the white and gold out of field goal range. From then on, Miami (FL) scored on the backs of Brad Kaaya and with two ensuing touchdowns via the defense, the Hurricanes enjoyed a 28–7 lead from there and eventually took the game by a final tally of 35–21. Georgia Tech's offense did show much improvement from the prior week against Clemson, racking up over two hundred forty yards on the ground. With a looming momentous game the following weekend in Pittsburgh, Pa, Georgia Tech seeks to rebound.

=== At Pittsburgh ===
| | 1 | 2 | 3 | 4 | Total |
|---|---|---|---|---|---|
| Yellow Jackets | 3 | 17 | 0 | 14 | 34 |
| Panthers | 7 | 14 | 3 | 13 | 37 |

| Overall record | Previous meeting | Previous winner |
|---|---|---|
| 4–6 | 2015 | PITT, 31–28 |

The Pittsburgh Panthers behind their transfer quarterback Peterman got off to a quick start against Georgia Tech, when they ran a trick play by throwing a flat screen out to their offensive tackle, who apparently was an eligible receiver on the play. The Tackle took the ball over 40 yards into the endzone to give the panthers an original 7–0 lead. Georgia Tech answered on the following drive with a field goal by senior veteran Harrison Butker. Unfortunately for the Jackets, following a strong performance by Quarterback Justin Thomas, an acrobatic 96 yard Kickoff return for a touchdown by Junior JJ Green, and two more A back scores from Clinton Lynch and another by Green, the white and gold fell up short ultimately. Taking the lead with close to 5 minutes left via a JJ Green touchdown, with the Yellow Jackets up 34–27, defending a third and long against Pittsburgh, a ball was tipped off of Corey Griffin's fingertips and into the hands of a Pittsburgh Tight End who ran an extra 45 yards into the endzone. On Tech's ensuing drive it came up short on fourth down and Chris Blewitt kicked a 28-yard field goal which ricocheted off the right post and in as time expired to defeat Georgia Tech.

=== Georgia Southern ===
| | 1 | 2 | 3 | 4 | Total |
|---|---|---|---|---|---|
| Eagles | 7 | 3 | 0 | 14 | 24 |
| Yellow Jackets | 21 | 0 | 0 | 14 | 35 |

| Overall record | Previous meeting | Previous winner |
|---|---|---|
| 1–0 | 2014 | GT, 42–38 |

Georgia Tech, behind the guidance of Justin Thomas, enjoyed a 35–24 win against the Georgia Southern Eagles in Atlanta. Thomas threw for 175 yards and a touchdown and Dedrick Mills added 89 yards on 12 carries and a Touchdown. The Yellow Jacket defense enjoyed a strong day, holding the Eagles offense to a minimal number of yards. Harrison Butker missed a short field goal, his only miss of the entire season. This was the second ever meeting between Georgia Tech and Georgia Southern, with Tech earning a win in 2014. At 1–3 in the ACC, Georgia Tech seeks to rebound over the next three weeks when it faces Top 20 University of North Carolina in Chapel Hill on November 5, and then the following weekend in Blacksburg Virginia facing #23 Virginia Tech. This weekend, Tech faces Duke in Atlanta in two weeks on October 29.

=== Duke ===
| | 1 | 2 | 3 | 4 | Total |
|---|---|---|---|---|---|
| Blue Devils | 0 | 7 | 21 | 7 | 35 |
| Yellow Jackets | 14 | 14 | 3 | 7 | 38 |

| Overall record | Previous meeting | Previous winner |
|---|---|---|
| 50–32–1 | 2015 | DUKE, 34–20 |

Bouncing back from a 1–3 start in the ACC, Senior Superstar Quarterback Justin Thomas racked up over 451 yards of Total Offense alone, tallying 195 yards on the ground and 257 yards through the air. Georgia Tech enjoyed a strong start to the game offensively, taking a 28–7 lead at halftime against the visiting the Duke Blue Devils from Durham, North Carolina, a team who had defeated Georgia Tech over the last two seasons, in 2014 and 2015. Georgia Tech won the Orange Bowl in 2014 and only lost three games, one of them being at hands of Duke. At the beginning of the Second half, Georgia Tech suffered two crucial turnovers which Duke turned into instant touchdowns, cutting the lead to 28–21. A Field Goal by Harrison Butker in the 3rd quarter gave Georgia Tech some leeway with a 31–21 lead, but Duke ensuingly scored two touchdowns to take the lead 35–31 with 6 minutes left in the game. With Georgia Tech needing a score, it was sacked on 1st and 10 from the 15, sending Tech back to its own 8-yard line. It was facing a 2nd and 17 with the clock running, one play before being sacked, and momentum completely on the side of the Duke Blue Devils. Matters were looking bleak. Justin Thomas avoided three rushers on 2nd and 17 in the endzone, avoiding a safety, and darted 61 yards down the sideline as the clock continued running and time began to slowly fade away in the game. Then, an acrobatic catch by Clinton Lynch from Thomas for a score sent the crowd into ecstasy and heartbeats began to relax. Needing a three and out to relax a bit, the Tech defense stood strong and Duke acted like it was going for it on 4th and 3 from its own 39 but the Quarterback quick snapped and punted the ball. From there, facing a third and seventeen, Justin Thomas avoiding a number of defenders and trekked 51 yards for a first down with 2 minutes remaining, allowing the White and Gold to run out the clock. This was Georgia Tech's second come from behind ACC victory in 2016, with the first coming in dramatic fashion overseas in Dublin, Ireland.

=== At North Carolina ===
| | 1 | 2 | 3 | 4 | Total |
|---|---|---|---|---|---|
| Yellow Jackets | 7 | 10 | 3 | 0 | 20 |
| #18 Tar Heels | 17 | 10 | 14 | 7 | 48 |

| Overall record | Previous meeting | Previous winner |
|---|---|---|
| 28–20–3 | 2015 | UNC, 38–31 |

Seeking to stay in the hunt for the 2016 Dr. Pepper ACC Championship in Orlando, Florida, Georgia Tech traveled to Chapel Hill North Carolina on November 5, 2016, seeking a win against Ryan Switzer and the North Carolina Tar Heels. In one of Tech's highlights, Clinton Lynch caught a 5-yard screen and bulldozed over six unc defenders for a 79-yard touchdown. Tech kept matters close until the second half.

=== At Virginia Tech ===
| | 1 | 2 | 3 | 4 | Total |
|---|---|---|---|---|---|
| Yellow Jackets | 6 | 14 | 0 | 10 | 30 |
| #18 Hokies | 0 | 0 | 7 | 13 | 20 |

| Overall record | Previous meeting | Previous winner |
|---|---|---|
| 4–9 | 2015 | VT, 23–21 |

Georgia Tech fired back at critics and the media the following weekend in dramatic fashion in Blacksburg, Virginia. On the opening kickoff of the ballgame, Ocee (Fla.) native Terrell Lewis spearheaded the Virginia Tech kick returner, and the ball was knocked loose where Knoxville (Tenn.) native Nathan Cottrell dove onto the ball and hung on for the Yellow Jackets. From there, the Georgia Tech offense and defense took a stand for themselves and manhandled the Virginia Tech offense in every way. The Georgia Tech defense brought immense pressure the entire game, pressuring Virginia Tech quarterback Athens (TX) native Jeron Evans. Tech sacked Evans six times and pressured him eleven times. Coaches Speed, Roof, and McCollum brought the heat the whole game and the Tech defense stood up immensely. Georgia Tech blocked a field goal attempt which was recovered by Lance Austin, who is famous for his epic blocked field goal return in October 2015 which propelled Georgia Tech to victory over top 5 Florida State University on the final play of the game. His twin brother Lawrence Austin enjoyed two acrobatic interceptions, which showed off his impeccable vision. The Georgia Tech offense, without fifth year senior veteran Justin Thomas, was thrust into victory mode behind an offensive line with three true freshman starting, Jahaziel Lee, Parker Braun, and Kenny Cooper. Redshirt sophomore Matthew Jordan of Jackson, Alabama made his first collegiate start at Georgia Tech, and his ability to lead the offense turned out to be a significant aid in the game. Jordan enjoyed a 55-yard touchdown scamper and sophomore Marcus Marshall enjoyed another 50-yard touchdown on top. Tech enjoyed a 30–7 lead with 5 minutes left and the final tally ended in a 30–20 victory for Georgia Tech.

=== Virginia ===
| | 1 | 2 | 3 | 4 | Total |
|---|---|---|---|---|---|
| Cavaliers | 0 | 10 | 0 | 7 | 17 |
| Yellow Jackets | 0 | 7 | 14 | 10 | 31 |

| Overall record | Previous meeting | Previous winner |
|---|---|---|
| 19–18–1 | 2015 | UVA, 27–21 |

On Senior Day for Justin Thomas, Patrick Gamble, Harrison Butker, and Roderick Rook Chungong, Georgia Tech surged to victory in front of 48,500 fans at Bobby Dodd Stadium. Their careers included two ACC Championship game appearances, one Orange Bowl Championship, one Sun Bowl Championship, and one Music City Bowl appearance. Justin Thomas was just yards shy of becoming the Georgia Tech leader in all-time total offense. He threw 5 of 11 completions with a long touchdown pass to Sophomore Clinton Lynch. The Georgia Tech defense played very well, with Lance Austin and Corey Griffin making two crucial interceptions. Tech would face archrival University of Georgia on November 26 in Athens, where it would seek an upset as an underdog.

=== At Georgia ===
| | 1 | 2 | 3 | 4 | Total |
|---|---|---|---|---|---|
| Yellow Jackets | 7 | 7 | 0 | 14 | 28 |
| Bulldogs | 7 | 7 | 13 | 0 | 27 |

Trailing UGA 14–27 with only 9:30 left in the game, the Yellow Jackets embarked on a 7 play, 94-yard touchdown drive that ended in a 5-yard touchdown run by Dedrick Mills to make it a 21–27 game with 6:28 remaining on the clock. On the ensuing Bulldogs drive, Georgia was able to run over 2 minutes off the clock. That drive ended, however, when Georgia Tech defensive back Lance Austin intercepted Jacob Eason with 3:39 left in the game. Starting from Georgia's 46-yard line, the Yellow Jackets drove down to The University of Georgia's red zone. On a 3rd and goal situation with 36 seconds left in the game, Georgia Tech called a toss pitch to Qua Searcy, who would then pass the ball to Justin Thomas on a trick play. When the Yellow Jackets ran the play, however, Thomas was covered. Instead of passing the ball, Searcy ran the ball in for a 6-yard touchdown to tie the game 27–27. The ensuing extra point gave Georgia Tech a 28–27 lead. On the last play of the game, Eason was once again intercepted, securing a victory for the Yellow Jackets.

With the victory, Justin Thomas became the first Georgia Tech quarterback to beat Georgia twice in his career since Joe Hamilton in 1998–99.

=== Kentucky ===
| | 1 | 2 | 3 | 4 | Total |
|---|---|---|---|---|---|
| Yellow Jackets | 10 | 10 | 3 | 10 | 33 |
| Wildcats | 0 | 3 | 0 | 15 | 18 |

Georgia Tech took an early lead on a strip-six fumble return forced by DT Pat Gamble, and finished by LB PJ Davis. Eventually, Georgia Tech won 33–18.

== Rankings ==
Ranking movements Legend: ██ Increase in ranking ██ Decrease in ranking — = Not ranked RV = Received votes
| | Week | | | | | | | | | | | | | | | |
| Poll | Pre | 1 | 2 | 3 | 4 | 5 | 6 | 7 | 8 | 9 | 10 | 11 | 12 | 13 | 14 | Final |
|---|---|---|---|---|---|---|---|---|---|---|---|---|---|---|---|---|
| AP | — | — | — | — | RV | — | — | — | — | — | — | — | — | RV | RV | RV |
| Coaches | — | — | — | — | RV | — | — | — | — | — | — | — | — | RV | — | RV |
| CFP | Not released | | | | | | | | | — | — | — | — | — | — | Not released |
