= C. J. Conrad =

American football player and coach (born 1996)

C.J. Conrad
Miami Dolphins
- Title: Offensive assistant

Personal information
- Born: May 9, 1996 (age 30); Fairview, Ohio
- Listed height: 6 ft 5 in (1.96 m)
- Listed weight: 250 lb (113 kg)

Career information
- High school: Keystone High School (LaGrange, Ohio)
- College: Kentucky (2015-2018)
- NFL draft: 2019: undrafted

Career history

Playing
- New York Giants (2019–2020)*
- * Offseason or practice squad member only

Coaching
- Kentucky (2020–2022) Graduate assistant; Eastern Kentucky (2023) Tight ends coach; Kent State (2024–2025) Tight ends coach; Miami Dolphins (2026–present) Offensive assistant
- Stats at Pro Football Reference

Christian Jacob "C. J." Conrad (born May 9, 1996) is an American college football coach and former player. He is an offensive assistant for the Miami Dolphins, a position he was hired for in February of 2026. He played tight end at the University of Kentucky.

== College career ==
In his career at Kentucky, Conrad compiled eighty receptions, one thousand fifteen receiving yards, and twelve receiving touchdowns. His twelve touchdowns are second all-time for tight ends at Kentucky behind James Whalen.

== Professional career ==
Pre-draft measurables
Height	Weight	Arm length	Hand span	Wingspan	40-yard dash	10-yard split	20-yard split	20-yard shuttle	Three-cone drill	Vertical jump	Broad jump	Bench press
6 ft 4 1/2 in (1.94 m)	249 lb (113 kg)	31 in (0.79 m)	9 1/4 in (0.23 m)	6 ft 2 1/8 in (1.88 m)	4.80 s	1.72 s	2.77 s	4.41 s	7.14 s	33.0 in (0.84 m)	9 ft 5 in (2.87 m)	21 reps
All values from NFL Combine/Pro Day

After going undrafted in the 2019 NFL draft, Conrad was signed by the New York Giants. He was waived on August 31, 2019 and was signed to the practice squad the next day. He was released on September 17. He signed a reserve/future contract with the Giants on January 2, 2020. On April 28, Conrad was released by the Giants.

== Coaching career ==
In July 2020, Conrad joined the University of Kentucky football staff as a graduate assistant while pursuing his master's degree.

On June 15, 2023, Conrad was hired to be the tight ends coach at Eastern Kentucky.

On May 8, 2024, Conrad was hired to be the tight ends coach at Kent State.

On February 13, 2026, the Miami Dolphins hired Conrad to serve as an offensive assistant under new head coach Jeff Hafley.

== Personal life ==
His parents, Mike and Lois Conrad, both played basketball at Tiffin University. His brother, Austin, plays defensive end at Ohio. His sister, Mackenzie, played collegiate softball at Akron and Coastal Carolina.
