= 2016 Louisville Cardinals football team =

American college football season

2016 Louisville Cardinals football

ACC Atlantic Division co-champion

Citrus Bowl, L 9–29 vs. LSU
- Conference: Atlantic Coast Conference
- Atlantic Division

Ranking
- Coaches: No. 20
- AP: No. 21
- Record: 9–4 (7–1 ACC)
- Head coach: Bobby Petrino (7th season)
- Co-offensive coordinators: Lonnie Galloway (1st season); Chris Klenakis (1st season)
- Offensive scheme: Multiple
- Defensive coordinator: Todd Grantham (3rd season)
- Base defense: 3–4
- Home stadium: Papa John's Cardinal Stadium

Uniform
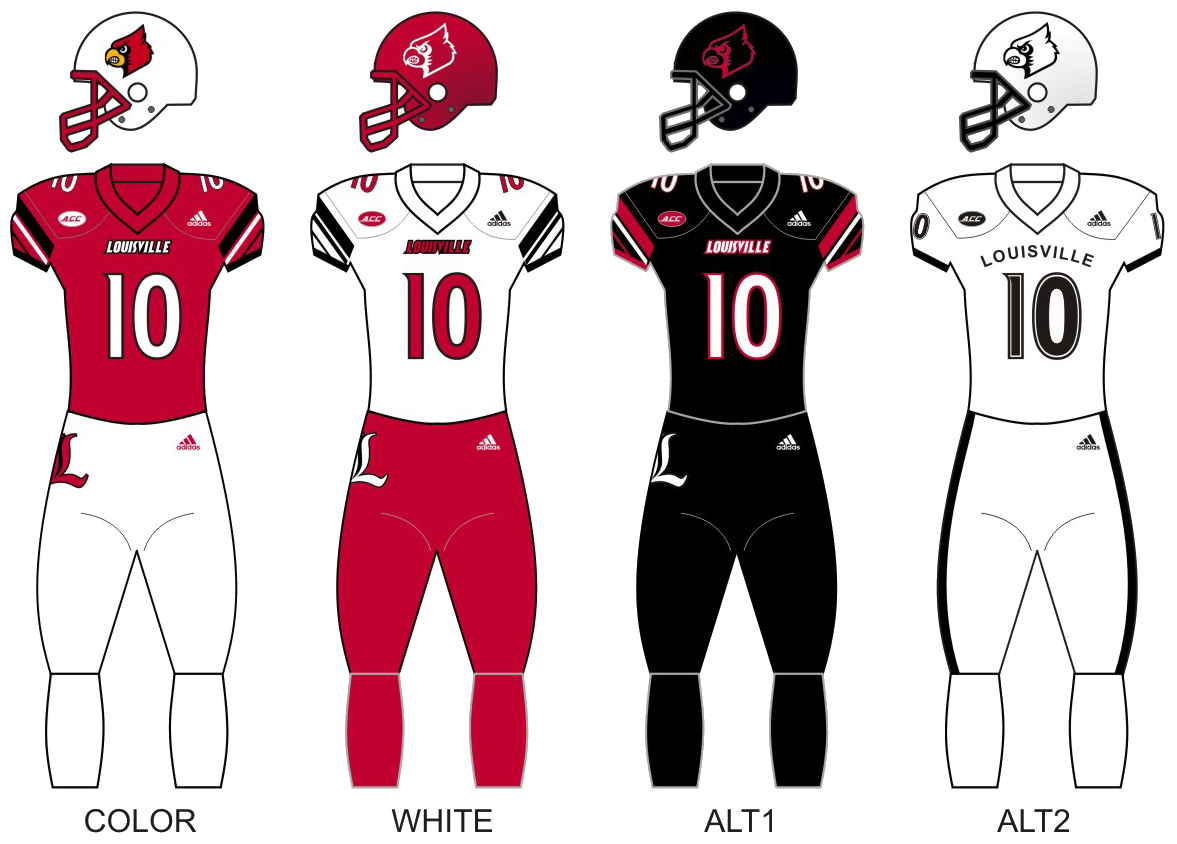

2016 Atlantic Coast Conference football standings
	Conf.			Overall
Team	W		L	W		L
Atlantic Division
No. 1 Clemson xy$#	7	–	1	14	–	1
No. 21 Louisville x	7	–	1	9	–	4
No. 8 Florida State	5	–	3	10	–	3
NC State	3	–	5	7	–	6
Wake Forest	3	–	5	7	–	6
Boston College	2	–	6	7	–	6
Syracuse	2	–	6	4	–	8
Coastal Division
No. 16 Virginia Tech xy	6	–	2	10	–	4
North Carolina	5	–	3	8	–	5
No. 20 Miami (FL)	5	–	3	9	–	4
Pittsburgh	5	–	3	8	–	5
Georgia Tech	4	–	4	9	–	4
Duke	1	–	7	4	–	8
Virginia	1	–	7	2	–	10
Championship: Clemson 42, Virginia Tech 35
# – College Football Playoff champion; $ – Conference champion; x – Division champion/co-champions; y – Championship game participant; Rankings from AP Poll

The 2016 Louisville Cardinals football team represented the University of Louisville in the 2016 NCAA Division I FBS football season. The Cardinals were led by then third-year head coach Bobby Petrino, who began his second stint at Louisville in 2014 after eight years away. The team played their home games at Papa John's Cardinal Stadium in Louisville, Kentucky. The Cardinals competed as a member of the Atlantic Division in the Atlantic Coast Conference.

The Cardinals were led by sophomore quarterback Lamar Jackson, who was responsible for 51 touchdowns on the year (30 passing and 21 rushing), which was second in FBS. He was awarded the Heisman Trophy, distinguishing him as the nation's best college football player, becoming the first Louisville player to win the award.

== Schedule ==
Date	Time	Opponent	Rank	Site	TV	Result	Attendance
September 1	7:00 p.m.	Charlotte*	No. 19	Papa John's Cardinal Stadium; Louisville, KY	ACCRSN	W 70–14	53,127
September 9	8:00 p.m.	at Syracuse	No. 13	Carrier Dome; Syracuse, NY	ESPN2	W 62–28	32,184
September 17	12:00 p.m.	No. 2 Florida State	No. 10	Papa John's Cardinal Stadium; Louisville, KY (College GameDay)	ABC	W 63–20	55,632
September 24	8:00 p.m.	at Marshall*	No. 3	Joan C. Edwards Stadium; Huntington, WV	CBSSN	W 59–28	40,592
October 1	8:00 p.m.	at No. 5 Clemson	No. 3	Memorial Stadium; Clemson, SC (College GameDay)	ABC	L 36–42	83,362
October 14	7:00 p.m.	Duke	No. 7	Papa John's Cardinal Stadium; Louisville, KY	ESPN	W 24–14	55,121
October 22	12:00 p.m.	NC State	No. 7	Papa John's Cardinal Stadium; Louisville, KY	ABC	W 54–13	55,218
October 29	12:00 p.m.	at Virginia	No. 5	Scott Stadium; Charlottesville, VA	ABC/ESPN2	W 32–25	34,824
November 5	12:00 p.m.	at Boston College	No. 7	Alumni Stadium; Chestnut Hill, MA	ESPN2	W 52–7	30,644
November 12	7:00 p.m.	Wake Forest	No. 5	Papa John's Cardinal Stadium; Louisville, KY	ESPN2	W 44–12	51,218
November 17	8:00 p.m.	at Houston*	No. 3	TDECU Stadium; Houston, TX	ESPN	L 10–36	42,822
November 26	12:00 p.m.	Kentucky*	No. 11	Papa John's Cardinal Stadium; Louisville, KY (Governor's Cup)	ESPN	L 38–41	54,075
December 31	11:00 a.m.	vs. No. 19 LSU*	No. 15	Camping World Stadium; Orlando, FL (Citrus Bowl)	ABC	L 9–29	46,063
*Non-conference game; Rankings from AP Poll and CFP Rankings after November 1 released prior to game; All times are in Eastern time

== Personnel ==
=== Roster ===
2016 Louisville Cardinals football team roster
Players
Coaches
Offense

Pos.	#	Name	Class
WR	1	Traveon Samuel	So
WR	2	Jamari Staples	Sr
WR	3	Pat Thomas	Sr
QB	4	Jawon Pass	Fr
WR	5	Seth Dawkins	Fr
WR	7	Reggie Bonnafon	Jr
QB	8	Lamar Jackson	So
WR	9	Jaylen Smith	So
RB	12	Trey Smith	RFr
QB	13	Ethan Horton	Jr
QB	14	Kyle Bolin	RJr
QB	15	Sean McCormack	Fr
WR	17	James Quick	Sr
TE	18	Cole Hikutini	Sr
WR	19	Ja'Quay Savage	Jr
RB	23	Brandon Radcliff	RSr
WR	26	Chris Taylor-Yamanoha	Fr
RB	27	L.J. Scott	Jr
RB	29	Malik Williams	Jr
RB	31	Malik Staples	Fr
RB	33	Malin Jones	Sr
RB	34	Jeremy Smith	Jr
WR	38	Chris Miele	RJr
RB	40	Dae Williams	Fr
TE	42	Tyler Polston	Jr
TE	44	Paul Logsdon	Jr
FB	46	Lamar Atkins	Sr
TE	48	Ausitn Cummins	Fr
OL	50	Khalil Hunter	Sr
OL	56	Kiola Mahoni	Jr
OL	60	Tyler Haycraft	So
OL	61	Tobijah Hughley	RSr
OL	63	Nathan Scheler	So
OL	65	Luke Schultheiss	Jr
OL	67	Thomas Nauert	So
OL	68	Danny Burns	RSo
OL	69	Chaz Ray	So
OL	70	Toriano Roundtrree	RSo
OL	71	Chandler Jones	RFr
OL	72	Lukayus McNeil	RSo
OL	73	Matt Cohen	Sr
OL	74	Geron Christian	So
OL	75	Robbie Bell	Fr
OL	77	Linwood Foy	Jr
OL	78	Max Martin	Fr
OL	79	Kenny Thomas	So
TE	80	Charles Standberry	Jr
WR	81	Emonee Spence	So
WR	82	Keon Wakefield	Fr
TE	83	Micky Crum	RSo
WR	84	Gio Pascascio	Sr
TE	85	Jordan Davis	So
WR	86	Devante Peete	So
WR	87	Dez Fitzpatrick	Fr
WR	88	Javonte Bagley	Jr
TE	89	Keith Towbridge	Sr

Defense

Pos.	#	Name	Class
CB	1	Alphonso Carter	Jr
CB	3	Cornelius Sturghill	RSo
CB	6	Shaq Wiggins	Jr
CB	10	Jaire Alexander	So
S	11	Dee Smith	So
S	13	P.J. Blue	Fr
DL	14	Drew Bailey	Jr
CB	15	Trumaine Washington	Jr
CB	20	Ronald Walker	Jr
S	21	London Iakopo	Jr
S	22	Chucky Williams	RJr
CB	24	Zykiesis Cannon	Jr
S	25	Josh Harvey-Clemons	Sr
CB	29	Javier Santiago	So
S	30	Khane Pass	RFr
LB	32	Stacy Thomas	RJr
DB	34	Marcus Mays	So
DB	35	Lamarques Thomas	Fr
CB	39	Aaron Floyd	So
DB	39	John Stitch	Sr
LB	42	Isaac Stewart	RSo
LB	43	Damien Smith	So
DL	44	Chris Williams	Jr
LB	47	Reese Melton	Fr
DL	48	Marcus Watson	Fr
DL	51	Kordell Slater	Fr
LB	52	Vince Lococo	Fr
LB	53	Amonte Caban	RFr
LB	54	Tobias Little	Fr
LB	55	Keith Kelsey	Sr
LB	58	Jonathan Greenard	RFr
DL	59	Caleb Tillman	Fr
DL	62	Derek Dorsey	Fr
DL	64	Tyler Robinson	Fr
LB	76	Luke Massad	Fr
DE	90	De'Asian Richardson	RJr
LB	91	Trevon Young	Sr
LB	92	Devonte Fields	Sr
LB	93	Gary McCrae	So
DT	94	G.G. Robinson	RFr
DT	95	Kyle Shortridge	RJr
OLB	96	Henry Famurewa	RSo
DT	97	DeAngelo Brown	RSr
LB	98	Tabarious Peterson	Fr
LB	99	James Hearns	RJr

Special teams

Pos.	#	Name	Class
P	29	Mason King	RFr
K	32	Blanton Creque	So
K	35	Anthony George	RSr
K	36	Evan O'Hara	So
LS	37	Kyle Goss	Fr
K	39	Austin Laszewski	Fr
LS	41	Ryan Betlach	Jr
K	43	Patrick Soucy	So
LS	46	Brendan Lowery	So
P	47	Austin Johnson	Fr
LS	49	Colin Holba	RSr

Head coach

- Bobby Petrino

Coordinators/assistant coaches

- Todd Grantham – Asst. Coach/Defensive Coord./Linebackers
- Lonnie Galloway – Asst. Coach/Co-Offensive Coordinator/Wide Receivers
- Chris Klenakis – Asst. Coach/Co-Offensive Coordinator/Offensive Line
- Tony Grantham – Asst. Coach/Inside Linebackers/Special Teams
- L.D. Scott – Asst. Coach/Def. Line
- Keith Heyward – Asst. Coach/Secondary
- Nick Petrino – Quarterbacks
- Cort Dennison – Asst. Secondary/Recruiting Coordinator
- Kolby Smith – Asst. Coach/Running Backs
- Matt Lombardi – Tight Ends Coach/Offensive Graduate Assistant
- Pete Brown – Offensive Quality Control
- Karibi Dede – Defensive Quality Control
- Kevin Elliott – Offensive Graduate Assistant
- Ronnie Fouch – Special Teams Quality Control
- J.B. Lageman – Defensive Graduate Assistant
- Mark Slack – Offensive Graduate Assistant
- Andrew Wagner – Director of Operations
- Joe Miday – Head Strength and Conditioning Coach
- Scott Wilks – Asst. Strength & Conditioning/Football
- Kyle Johnston – Director of Sports Medicine/Football
- Dave Spina – Director of Video Operations
- Mike Kurowski – Dir. of Equipment Operations/Football
- Denise Murphy – Administrative Associate to Head Coach
- Pete Nochta – Director of On-Campus Recruiting
- David Boller – Director of High School Relations
- Justin Ruffin – Assistant AD/Academic Services
- Robyn Mattingly-Crume – Recruiting Assistant
- John Parenti – Performance Nutritionist
- Kayla Matrunick – Director of Performance Nutrition
- Teddy O'Connor – Asst. Strength & Conditioning/Football
- George Carpenter – Assistant Strength and Conditioning Coach

Legend

- (C) Team captain
- (S) Suspended
- (I) Ineligible
- Injured
- Redshirt

Roster

=== Depth chart ===
Defense

FS
Chucky Williams
Dee Smith
Khane Pass

WLB	ILB	ILB	SLB
Devonte Fields	Keith Kelsey	Stacy Thomas	James Hearns
Jonathan Greenard	Isaac Stewart	Amonte Caban	Henry Famurewa
Gary McCrae	–	–	–

SS
Josh Harvey-Clemons
Zykiesis Cannon
London Iakopo

CB
Jaire Alexander
Ronald Walker
Alphonso Carter

DE	NT	DE
Drew Bailey	DeAngelo Brown	Johnny Richardson
Chris Williams	Kyle Shortridge	G.G. Robinson
–	–	–

CB
Shaq Wiggins
Trumaine Washington
–

Offense

WR
James Quick
Jaylen Smith
Javonte Bagley

WR
Reggie Bonnafon
Traveon Samuel
Gio Pascascio

LT	LG	C	RG	RT
Geron Christian	Khalil Hunter	Tobijah Hughley	Kiola Mahoni	Lukayus McNeil
Tyler Haycraft	Chandler Jones	Nathan Scheler	Kenny Thomas	Toriano Roundtrree
Linwood Foy	–	Robbie Bell	–	Danny Burns

TE
Cole Hikutini
Keith Towbridge
Micky Crum

WR
Jamari Staples
Devonte Peete
Seth Dawkins

QB
Lamar Jackson
Kyle Bolin
Jawon Pass

Key reserves
Lamar Atkins – FB
Desmond Fitzpatrick – WR
Out (Season)
– Trevon Young – LB
Out
- Ja'Quay Savage – WR

RB
Brandon Radcliff
L.J. Scott
Jeremy Smith

Special teams
PK Blanton Creque
P Mason King
KR Traveon Samuel & Jaire Alexander
PR Jaire Alexander & Traveon Samuel
LS Colin Holba
H Mason King

Official Depth Chart 2016.

True Freshman
Double Position : *

== Rankings ==
Ranking movements Legend: ██ Increase in ranking ██ Decrease in ranking ( ) = First-place votes
	Week															
Poll	Pre	1	2	3	4	5	6	7	8	9	10	11	12	13	14	Final
AP	19	13	10	3 (6)	3 (6)	7	7	7	5	5	5	3	11	16	15	21
Coaches	23	15	10	4	4	8	7	7	5	5	6	3	11	15	15	20
CFP	Not released									7	6	5	11	13	13	Not released

== Recruiting ==
National Signing Day was February 3, 2016. The Cardinals signed 23 players in total.

College recruiting
Name	Hometown	School	Height	Weight	40^{‡}	Commit date
Desmond Fitzpatrick; WR	Waterford, Michigan	Waterford Mott H.S.	6 ft 2 in (1.88 m)	189 lb (86 kg)	—	Jan 29, 2016
Desmond Fitzpatrick; WR	Recruit ratings: Scout: Rivals: 247Sports:					
Jawon Pass; QB	Columbus, Georgia	Carver H.S.	6 ft 5 in (1.96 m)	225 lb (102 kg)	—	Jul 16, 2015
Jawon Pass; QB	Recruit ratings: Scout: Rivals: 247Sports:					
Chris Taylor-Yamanoha; WR	Rohnert Park, California	Rancho Cotate	6 ft 2 in (1.88 m)	178 lb (81 kg)	—	May 3, 2015
Chris Taylor-Yamanoha; WR	Recruit ratings: Scout: Rivals: 247Sports:					
PJ Blue; LB	Montgomery, Alabama	Park Crossing H.S.	6 ft 4 in (1.93 m)	201 lb (91 kg)	—	Dec 1, 2015
PJ Blue; LB	Recruit ratings: Scout: Rivals: 247Sports:					
Michael Boykin; DE	Carrolltown, Georgia	Carrolltown H.S.	6 ft 6 in (1.98 m)	248 lb (112 kg)	—	Jul 20, 2015
Michael Boykin; DE	Recruit ratings: Scout: Rivals: 247Sports:					
Robbie Bell; OL	Hoschton, Georgia	Mill Creek H.S.	6 ft 5 in (1.96 m)	265 lb (120 kg)	—	Apr 23, 2015
Robbie Bell; OL	Recruit ratings: Scout: Rivals: 247Sports:					
Seth Dawkins; WR	Columbus, Ohio	Franklin Heights H.S.	6 ft 3 in (1.91 m)	201 lb (91 kg)	—	May 3, 2015
Seth Dawkins; WR	Recruit ratings: Scout: Rivals: 247Sports:					
Derick Dorsey; DT	Louisville, Kentucky	duPont Manual H.S.	6 ft 4 in (1.93 m)	263 lb (119 kg)	—	Mar 10, 2015
Derick Dorsey; DT	Recruit ratings: Scout: Rivals: 247Sports:					
London Lakopo; DB	Long Beach, California	Long Beach Poly	6 ft 0 in (1.83 m)	215 lb (98 kg)	—	Feb 3, 2016
London Lakopo; DB	Recruit ratings: Scout: Rivals: 247Sports:					
Tobias little LB	Atlanta, Georgia	Mays H.S.	6 ft 0 in (1.83 m)	236 lb (107 kg)	—	Jan 20, 2016
Tobias little LB	Recruit ratings: Scout: Rivals: 247Sports:					
Tobarius Peterson; LB	Tucker, Georgia	Tucker H.S.	6 ft 1 in (1.85 m)	214 lb (97 kg)	—	Jul 23, 2015
Tobarius Peterson; LB	Recruit ratings: Scout: Rivals: 247Sports:					
Kordell Slater; DE	Port Charlotte, Florida	Port Charlotte H.S.	6 ft 5 in (1.96 m)	250 lb (110 kg)	—	Dec 13, 2014
Kordell Slater; DE	Recruit ratings: Scout: Rivals: 247Sports:					
Lamarques Thomas; DB	Clinton, Mississippi	Clinton H.S.	6 ft 0 in (1.83 m)	178 lb (81 kg)	—	Sep 10, 2015
Lamarques Thomas; DB	Recruit ratings: Scout: Rivals: 247Sports:					
Caleb Tillman; DE	Dothan, Alabama	Northview H.S.	6 ft 3 in (1.91 m)	252 lb (114 kg)	—	Jul 31, 2015
Caleb Tillman; DE	Recruit ratings: Scout: Rivals: 247Sports:					
Keion Wakefield; WR	Louisville, Kentucky	Male H.S.	5 ft 9 in (1.75 m)	164 lb (74 kg)	—	Jul 23, 2015
Keion Wakefield; WR	Recruit ratings: Scout: Rivals: 247Sports:					
Ronald Walker; DB	Wesson, Mississippi	Copiah-Lincoln Community College	6 ft 3 in (1.91 m)	200 lb (91 kg)	—	Nov 8, 2015
Ronald Walker; DB	Recruit ratings: Scout: Rivals: 247Sports:					
Chris Williams; DT	Senatobia, Mississippi	Northwest Mississippi Community College	6 ft 1 in (1.85 m)	280 lb (130 kg)	—	Nov 15, 2015
Chris Williams; DT	Recruit ratings: Scout: Rivals: 247Sports:					
Dae Williams; RB	Sapulpa, Oklahoma	Sapulpa H.S.	6 ft 1 in (1.85 m)	220 lb (100 kg)	—	Jan 21, 2016
Dae Williams; RB	Recruit ratings: Scout: Rivals: 247Sports:					
Malik Williams; WR	Santa Clara, California	Allan Hancock Community College	6 ft 2 in (1.88 m)	210 lb (95 kg)	—	Feb 3, 2016
Malik Williams; WR	Recruit ratings: Scout: Rivals: 247Sports:					
Malik Staples; RB	Suwanne, Georgia	Peachtree Ridge H.S.	5 ft 11 in (1.80 m)	211 lb (96 kg)	—	Jun 15, 2015
Malik Staples; RB	Recruit ratings: Scout: Rivals: 247Sports:					
Gary McCrae; LB	Scooba, Mississippi	East Mississippi Community College	6 ft 5 in (1.96 m)	235 lb (107 kg)	—	Feb 3, 2016
Gary McCrae; LB	Recruit ratings: Scout: Rivals: 247Sports:					
Austin Johnson; K	Louisville, Kentucky	DeSales H.S.	6 ft 2 in (1.88 m)	190 lb (86 kg)	—	Apr 23, 2015
Austin Johnson; K	Recruit ratings: Scout: Rivals: 247Sports:					
Austin Cummins; TE	Stevenson, Alabama	North Jackson H.S.	6 ft 6 in (1.98 m)	220 lb (100 kg)	—	Apr 23, 2015
Austin Cummins; TE	Recruit ratings: Scout: Rivals: 247Sports:					
Overall recruit ranking: Scout: 40 Rivals: 37 247Sports: 37
‡ Refers to 40-yard dash; Note: In many cases, Scout, Rivals, 247Sports, On3, and ESPN may conflict in their listings of height, weight and 40 time.; In these cases, the average was taken. ESPN grades are on a 100-point scale.; Sources: "2016 Team Ranking". Rivals.com.

Additional Recruiting Sources

== Game summaries ==
=== Charlotte ===
	1	2	3	4	Total
49ers	0	0	7	7	14
#19 Cardinals	28	28	7	7	70

- (Q1, 12:03) LOU – #8 Lamar Jackson 36-yard run (#36 Evan O'Hara kick) – LOU 7–0
- (Q1, 6:49) LOU – #7 Reggie Bonnafon 13-yard pass from #8 Lamar Jackson (#36 Evan O'Hara kick) – LOU 14–0
- (Q1, 3:47) LOU – #34 Jeremy Smith 24-yard pass from #8 Lamar Jackson (#36 Evan O'Hara kick) – LOU 21–0
- (Q1, 0:00) LOU – #8 Lamar Jackson 1-yard run (#36 Evan O'Hara kick) – LOU 28–0
- (Q2, 12:05) LOU – #23 Brandon Radcliff 16-yard pass from #8 Lamar Jackson (#36 Evan O'Hara kick) – LOU 35–0
- (Q2, 6:27) LOU – #27 L.J. Scott 20-yard pass from #8 Lamar Jackson (#36 Evan O'Hara kick) – LOU 42–0
- (Q2, 2:59) LOU – #17 James Quick 32-yard pass from #8 Lamar Jackson (#36 Evan O'Hara kick) – LOU 49–0
- (Q2, 0:05) LOU – #18 Cole Hikutini 1-yard pass from #8 Lamar Jackson (#36 Evan O'Hara kick) – LOU 56–0
- (Q3, 8:36) CHA – Austin Duke 24-yard pass from Kevin Olsen (Stephen Muscarello kick) – LOU 56–7
- (Q3, 4:43) LOU – #1 Traveon Samuel 18-yard pass from #14 Kyle Bolin (#36 Evan O'Hara kick) – LOU 63–7
- (Q4, 10:16) LOU – #5 Seth Dawkins 13-yard pass from #14 Kyle Bolin (#32 Blanton Creque kick) – LOU 70–7
- (Q4, 3:46) CHA – Anthony Covington recovered fumble (Stephen Muscarello kick) – LOU 70–14

=== At Syracuse ===
	1	2	3	4	Total
#13 Cardinals	28	7	7	20	62
Orange	7	14	7	0	28

- (Q1, 14:44) LOU – #17 James Quick 72-yard pass from #8 Lamar Jackson (#36 Evan O'Hara kick) – LOU 7–0
- (Q1, 12:13) LOU – #8 Lamar Jackson 7-yard run (#36 Evan O'Hara kick) – LOU 14–0
- (Q1, 10:17) LOU – #8 Lamar Jackson 72-yard run (#36 Evan O'Hara kick) – LOU 21–0
- (Q1, 6:58) SYR – Brisly Estime 15-yard pass from Eric Dungey (Cole Murphy kick) – LOU 21–7
- (Q1, 4:11) LOU – #8 Lamar Jackson 13-yard run (#36 Evan O'Hara kick) – LOU 28–7
- (Q2, 3:23) LOU – #8 Lamar Jackson 9-yard run (#36 Evan O'Hara kick) – LOU 35–7
- (Q2, 2:42) SYR – Amba Etta-Tawo 47-yard pass from Eric Dungey (Cole Murphy kick) – LOU 35–14
- (Q2, 0:40) SYR – Amba Etta-Tawo 4-yard pass from Eric Dungey (Cole Murphy kick) – LOU 35–21
- (Q3, 12:18) LOU – #1 Traveon Samuel 21-yard run (#36 Evan O'Hara kick) – LOU 42–21
- (Q3, 6:49) SYR – Eric Dungey 1-yard run (Cole Murphy kick) – LOU 42–28
- (Q4, 13:16) LOU – #36 Evan O'Hara 26-yard field goal – LOU 45–28
- (Q4, 10:16) LOU – #36 Evan O'Hara 41-yard field goal – LOU 48–28
- (Q4, 8:55) LOU – #23 Brandon Radcliff 48-yard run (#36 Evan O'Hara kick) – LOU 55–28
- (Q4, 7:31) LOU – #34 Jeremy Smith 30-yard run (#36 Evan O'Hara kick) – LOU 62–28

=== Florida State ===
	1	2	3	4	Total
#2 Seminoles	3	7	0	10	20
#10 Cardinals	14	21	14	14	63

- (Q1, 12:54) LOU – #8 Lamar Jackson 2-yard run, (#36 Evan O'Hara kick) – LOU 7–0
- (Q1, 4:50) LOU – #8 Lamar Jackson 14-yard run, (#36 Evan O'Hara kick) – LOU 14–0
- (Q1, 1:41) FSU – Ricky Aguayo 47-yard field goal – LOU 14–3
- (Q2, 10:56) FSU – Auden Tate 20-yard pass from Deondre Francois, (Ricky Aguayo kick) – LOU 14–10
- (Q2, 7:40) LOU – #9 Jaylen Smith 2-yard run, (#36 Evan O'Hara kick) – LOU 21–10
- (Q2, 5:03) LOU – #9 Jaylen Smith 4-yard pass from #8 Lamar Jackson, (#36 Evan O'Hara kick) – LOU 28–10
- (Q2, 0:12) LOU – #8 Lamar Jackson 1-yard run, (#36 Evan O'Hara kick) – LOU 35–10
- (Q3, 13:49) LOU – #10 Jaire Alexander 69-yard punt return (#36 Evan O'Hara kick) – LOU 42–10
- (Q3, 5:02) LOU – #9 Jaylen Smith 1-yard run, (#36 Evan O'Hara kick) – LOU 49–10
- (Q4, 14:27) LOU – #8 Lamar Jackson 47-yard run, (#36 Evan O'Hara kick) – LOU 56–10
- (Q4, 12:30) LOU – #23 Brandon Radcliff 6-yard run, (#36 Evan O'Hara kick) – LOU 63–10
- (Q4, 5:19) FSU – Auden Tate 12-yard pass from J.J. Cosentino, (Ricky Aguayo kick) – LOU 63–17
- (Q4, 0:51) FSU – Ricky Aguayo 33-yard field goal – LOU 63–20

=== At Marshall ===
	1	2	3	4	Total
#3 Cardinals	7	28	17	7	59
Thundering Herd	0	7	0	21	28

- (Q1, 10:57) LOU – #17 James Quick 71-yard pass from #8 Lamar Jackson (#32 Blanton Creque kick) – LOU 7–0
- (Q2, 11:10) LOU – #18 Cole Hikutini 8-yard pass from #8 Lamar Jackson (#32 Blanton Creque kick) – LOU 14–0
- (Q2, 5:02) LOU – #18 Cole Hikutini 30-yard pass from #8 Lamar Jackson (#32 Blanton Creque kick) – LOU 21–0
- (Q2, 3:14) LOU – #8 Lamar Jackson 4-yard run (#32 Blanton Creque kick) – LOU 28–0
- (Q2, 0:36) MAR – Ryan Yurachek 16-yard pass from Garet Morrell (Amoreto Curraj kick) – LOU 28–7
- (Q2, 0:02) LOU – #7 Reggie Bonnafon 8-yard pass from #8 Lamar Jackson (#32 Blanton Creque kick) – LOU 35–7
- (Q3, 12:33) LOU – #8 Lamar Jackson 9-yard run (#32 Blanton Creque kick) – LOU 42–7
- (Q3, 5:01) LOU – #32 Blanton Creque 39-yard field goal – LOU 45–7
- (Q3, 2:19) LOU – #9 Jaylen Smith 51-yard pass from #8 Lamar Jackson (#32 Blanton Creque kick) – LOU 52–7
- (Q4, 13:40) MAR – Keion Davis 12-yard pass from Garet Morrell (Amoreto Curraj kick) – LOU 52–14
- (Q4, 13:25) MAR – Ty Tyler 26 fumble return (Amoreto Curraj kick) – LOU 52–21
- (Q4, 6:36) LOU – #23 Brandon Radcliff 10-yard run (#32 Blanton Creque kick) – LOU 59–21
- (Q4, 2:41) MAR – Tony Pittman 13-yard run (Amoreto Curraj kick) – LOU 59–28

=== At Clemson ===
	1	2	3	4	Total
#3 Cardinals	0	10	16	10	36
#5 Tigers	0	28	0	14	42

- (Q2, 14:18) LOU – #34 Jeremy Smith 1-yard run (#32 Blanton Creque kick) – LOU 7–0
- (Q2, 7:48) CLEM – Deon Cain 37-yard pass from Deshaun Watson (Greg Huegel kick) – LOU 7–7
- (Q2, 6:09) CLEM – Wayne Gallman 24-yard run (Greg Huegel kick) – CLEM 14–7
- (Q2, 3:47) CLEM – Deon Cain 33-yard pass from Deshaun Watson (Greg Huegel kick) – CLEM 21–7
- (Q2, 0:37) LOU – #32 Blanton Creque 26-yard field goal – CLEM 21–10
- (Q2, 0:05) CLEM – Artavis Scott 5-yard pass from Deshaun Watson (Greg Huegel kick) – CLEM 28–10
- (Q3, 11:20) LOU – #17 James Quick 8-yard pass from #8 Lamar Jackson – CLEM 28–16
- (Q3, 5:21) LOU – #32 Blanton Creque 21-yard field goal – CLEM 28–19
- (Q3, 0:45) LOU – #8 Lamar Jackson 1-yard run (#32 Blanton Creque kick) – CLEM 28–26
- (Q4, 10:23) LOU – #32 Blanton Creque 28-yard field goal – LOU 29–28
- (Q4, 7:52) LOU – #8 Lamar Jackson 11-yard run (#32 Blanton Creque kick) – LOU 36–28
- (Q4, 7:05) CLEM – Mike Williams 20-yard pass from Deshaun Watson – LOU 36–34
- (Q4, 3:14) CLEM – Jordan Leggett 31-yard pass from Deshaun Watson (2pts) – CLEM 42–36

=== Duke ===
	1	2	3	4	Total
Blue Devils	7	0	0	7	14
#7 Cardinals	7	3	7	7	24

- (Q1, 11:11) LOU – #9 Jaylen Smith 5-yard pass from #8 Lamar Jackson (#36 Evan O'Hara kick) – LOU 7–0
- (Q1, 6:06) DUKE – Erich Schneider 9-yard pass from Daniel Jones (AJ Reed kick) – LOU 7–7
- (Q2, 14:51) LOU – #36 Evan O'Hara 22-yard field goal – LOU 10–7
- (Q3, 10:50) LOU – #34 Jeremy Smith 80-yard run (#36 Evan O'Hara kick) – LOU 17–7
- (Q4, 6:34) DUKE – Johnathan Lloyd 20-yard pass from Daniel Jones (AJ Reed kick) – LOU 17–14
- (Q4, 1:32) LOU – #8 Lamar Jackson 2-yard run (#36 Evan O'Hara kick) – LOU 24–14

=== NC State ===
	1	2	3	4	Total
Wolfpack	0	0	13	0	13
#7 Cardinals	17	27	0	10	54

- (Q1, 13:27) LOU – #8 Lamar Jackson 36-yard run, (#32 Blanton Creque kick) – LOU 7–0
- (Q1, 11:20) LOU – #32 Blanton Creque 37-yard field goal – LOU 10–0
- (Q1, 5:21) LOU – #9 Jaylen Smith 74-yard pass from #8 Lamar Jackson, (#32 Blanton Creque kick) – LOU 17–0
- (Q2, 14:48) LOU – #32 Blanton Creque 33-yard field goal – LOU 20–0
- (Q2, 10:09) LOU – #34 Jeremy Smith 1-yard run, (#32 Blanton Creque kick) – LOU 27–0
- (Q2, 3:57) LOU – #18 Cole Hikutini 3-yard pass from #8 Lamar Jackson, (#32 Blanton Creque kick) – LOU 34–0
- (Q2, 3:09) LOU – #2 Jamari Staples 2-yard pass from #8 Lamar Jackson, (#32 Blanton Creque kick) – LOU 41–0
- (Q2, 0:39) LOU – #32 Blanton Creque 24-yard field goal – LOU 44–0
- (Q3, 5:55) NCST – Kelvin Harmon 14-yard pass from Ryan Finley, (Kyle Bambard kick) – LOU 44–7
- (Q3, 1:14) NCST – Maurice Trowell 70-yard pass from Ryan Finley – LOU 44–13
- (Q4, 9:14) LOU – #34 Jeremy Smith 1-yard run, (#32 Blanton Creque kick) – LOU 51–13
- (Q4, 3:46) LOU – #32 Blanton Creque 27-yard field goal – LOU 54–13

=== At Virginia ===
	1	2	3	4	Total
#5 Cardinals	7	0	7	18	32
Cavaliers	10	0	7	8	25

- (Q1, 10:23) UVA – Sam Hayward 27-yard field goal – UVA 3–0
- (Q1, 3:41) LOU – #2 Jamari Staples 15-yard pass from #8 Lamar Jackson (#32 Blanton Creque kick) – LOU 7–3
- (Q1, 1:26) UVA – Doni Dowling 9-yard pass from Kurt Benkert (Sam Hayward kick) – UVA 10–7
- (Q2, 9:42) UVA – Olamide Zaccheaus 9-yard pass from Kurt Benkert (Sam Hayward kick) – UVA 17–7
- (Q2, 4:08) LOU – #7 Reggie Bonnafon 8-yard pass from #8 Lamar Jackson (#32 Blanton Creque kick) – UVA 17–14
- (Q4, 13:52) LOU – #7 Reggie Bonnafon 10-yard pass from #8 Lamar Jackson (#32 Blanton Creque kick) – LOU 21–17
- (Q4, 8:13) LOU – #32 Blanton Creque 32-yard field goal – LOU 24–17
- (Q4, 2:00) UVA – Doni Dowling 9-yard pass from Kurt Benkert (2pts) – UVA 25–24
- (Q4, 0:18) LOU – #9 Jaylen Smith 29-yard pass from #8 Lamar Jackson (2pts) – LOU 32–25

=== At Boston College ===
	1	2	3	4	Total
#7 Cardinals	21	17	14	0	52
Eagles	0	0	7	0	7

- (Q1, 13:55) LOU – #8 Lamar Jackson 69-yard run (#32 Blanton Creque kick) – LOU 7–0
- (Q1, 9:13) LOU – #17 James Quick 30-yard pass from #8 Lamar Jackson (#32 Blanton Creque kick) – LOU 14–0
- (Q1, 0:57) LOU – #9 Jaylen Smith 44-yard pass from #8 Lamar Jackson (#32 Blanton Creque kick) – LOU 21–0
- (Q2, 14:50) LOU – #17 James Quick 10-yard pass from #8 Lamar Jackson (#32 Blanton Creque kick) – LOU 28–0
- (Q2, 6:22) LOU – #18 Cole Hikutini 5-yard pass from #8 Lamar Jackson (#32 Blanton Creque kick) – LOU 35–0
- (Q2, 0:06) LOU – #32 Blanton Creque 26-yard field goal – LOU 38–0
- (Q3, 11:45) BC – Tyler Rouse 39-yard pass from Patrick Towles (Mike Knoll kick) – LOU 38–7
- (Q3, 8:19) LOU – #8 Lamar Jackson 13-yard run (#32 Blanton Creque kick) – LOU 45–7
- (Q3, 1:57) LOU – #8 Lamar Jackson 53-yard run (#32 Blanton Creque kick) – LOU 52–7

=== Wake Forest ===
	1	2	3	4	Total
Demon Deacons	6	6	0	0	12
#5 Cardinals	0	3	7	34	44

- (Q1, 11:24) WF – Mike Weaver 37-yard field goal – WF 3–0
- (Q1, 5:27) WF – Mike Weaver 45-yard field goal – WF 6–0
- (Q2, 8:19) WF – Mike Weaver 33-yard field goal – WF 9–0
- (Q2, 2:49) WF – Mike Weaver 38-yard field goal – WF 12–0
- (Q2, 0:18) LOU – #32 Blanton Creque 26-yard field goal – WF 12–3
- (Q3, 7:30) LOU – #23 Brandon Radcliff 55-yard run (#32 Blanton Creque kick) – WF 12–10
- (Q4, 10:35) LOU – #23 Brandon Radcliff 7-yard run (2pt failed) – LOU 16–12
- (Q4, 7:36) LOU – #23 Brandon Radcliff 19-yard run (#32 Blanton Creque kick) – LOU 23–12
- (Q4, 4:05) LOU – #18 Cole Hikutini 2-yard pass from #8 Lamar Jackson (#32 Blanton Creque kick) – LOU 30–12
- (Q4, 3:44) LOU – #20 Ronald Walker 31-yard interception return (#32 Blanton Creque kick) – LOU 37–12
- (Q4, 0:50) LOU – #29 Malik Williams 2-yard run (#32 Blanton Creque kick) – LOU 44–12

=== At Houston ===
	1	2	3	4	Total
#3 Cardinals	0	0	7	3	10
Cougars	10	21	0	5	36

- (Q1, 14:49) UH – Duke Catalon 13-yard pass from Greg Ward Jr. (Ty Cummings kick) – UH 7–0
- (Q1, 0:49) UH – Ty Cummings 33-yard field goal – UH 10–0
- (Q2, 12:18) UH – Duke Catalon 13-yard pass from Greg Ward Jr. (Ty Cummings kick) – UH 17–0
- (Q2, 6:53) UH – Duke Catalon 2-yard run (Ty Cummings kick) – UH 24–0
- (Q2, 5:13) UH – Chance Allen 50-yard pass from Linell Bonner (Ty Cummings kick) – UH 31–0
- (Q3, 10:02) LOU – #18 Cole Hikutini 12-yard pass from #8 Lamar Jackson (#32 Blanton Creque kick) – UH 31–7
- (Q4, 14:51) LOU – #32 Blanton Creque 26-yard field goal – UH 31–10
- (Q4, 5:57) UH – Ty Cummings 46-yard field goal – UH 34–10
- (Q4, 3:55) UH – Team Safety – UH 36–10

=== Kentucky ===
	1	2	3	4	Total
Wildcats	14	7	10	10	41
#11 Cardinals	7	17	7	7	38

=== LSU–Citrus Bowl ===
	1	2	3	4	Total
#19 Tigers	0	16	10	3	29
#15 Cardinals	3	3	0	3	9

- (Q1, 7:14) LOU – Blanton Creque 24-yard field goal – LOU 3–0
- (Q2, 14:54) LSU – Colin Heter 1-yard pass from Danny Etling (Colby Delahoussaye kick)- LSU 7–3
- (Q2, 7:14) LSU – Derrius Guice 1-yard pass from Danny Etling (Colby Delahoussaye kick)- LSU 14–3
- (Q2, 1:08) LSU – Lamar Jackson tackled in end zone for a safety by Arden Key- LSU 16–3
- (Q2, 0:00) LOU – Blanton Creque 47-yard field goal – LSU 16–6
- (Q3, 8:48) LSU – Derrius Guice 70-yard run (Colby Delahoussaye kick)- LSU 23–6
- (Q3, 3:04) LSU – Colby Delahoussaye 42-yard field goal – LSU 26–6
- (Q4, 14:43) LOU – Blanton Creque 30-yard field goal – LSU 26–9
- (Q4, 10:38) LSU – Colby Delahoussaye 25-yard field goal – LSU 29–9
