= Randy Bates =

American football coach (born 1960)

Biographical details
- Born: July 3, 1960 (age 66)
- Education: Ohio State University

Coaching career (HC unless noted)
- 1982: Muskingum (OL)
- 1983: Miami (OH) (GA)
- 1984–1988: Saint Joseph's (IN) (DC)
- 1989–1991: Navy (LB/DB)
- 1992–1997: New Hampshire (LB)
- 1998–1999: Kent State (LB)
- 2000–2004: Louisiana Tech (DB/LB)
- 2005: Louisiana Tech (DC/DB)
- 2006–2017: Northwestern (LB)
- 2018–2025: Pittsburgh (DC)

Randy Bates (born July 3, 1960) is a former American football coach.

== Coaching career ==
In 1982, Bates began his coaching career at Division III Muskingum College. From there he spent the 1983 season as a graduate assistant at Miami University. From 1984 to 1988 he served as defensive coordinator and recruiting coordinator for the Saint Joseph's College Pumas. He spent the next three seasons coaching linebackers and defensive backs for the Navy Midshipmen, during which he commissioned as an unrestricted line officer in the United States Navy due to new rules requiring additional service academy assistant coaches to serve in the military. Bates coached linebackers at New Hampshire from 1992 to 1997.

From 2006 to 2017, Bates spent 12 seasons coaching linebackers for the Northwestern Wildcats and head coach Pat Fitzgerald. Bates' linebacker unit helped the No. 17 Wildcats post a 10-3 record in 2017, which included a win over the Kentucky Wildcats in the Music City Bowl. He coached back-to-back All-America linebackers, in Anthony Walker Jr. and Paddy Fisher.

On January 13, 2018, Bates was hired by the Pittsburgh Panthers and head coach Pat Narduzzi as the defensive coordinator, a position left vacant by Josh Conklin. Ahead of the 2025 Military Bowl, Bates announced he would retire from coaching following the game.

== Personal life ==
Bates' father and grandfather served in the United States Army. During Bates' time in the Navy, he taught physical education at the United States Naval Academy while the Department of the Navy paid his football coaching salary rather than the athletic program.

In February 2019, Bates was diagnosed with oropharyngeal cancer. He was declared cancer free by December.
