= 2017 Kentucky Wildcats football team =

American college football season

2017 Kentucky Wildcats football

Music City Bowl, L 23–24 vs. Northwestern
- Conference: Southeastern Conference
- Eastern Division
- Record: 7–6 (4–4 SEC)
- Head coach: Mark Stoops (5th season)
- Offensive coordinator: Eddie Gran (2nd season)
- Co-offensive coordinator: Darin Hinshaw (2nd season)
- Offensive scheme: Spread
- Defensive coordinator: Matt House (1st season)
- Base defense: 3–4 or 4–3
- Home stadium: Kroger Field

2017 Southeastern Conference football standings
	Conf.			Overall
Team	W		L	W		L
Eastern Division
No. 2 Georgia x$^	7	–	1	13	–	2
South Carolina	5	–	3	9	–	4
Kentucky	4	–	4	7	–	6
Missouri	4	–	4	7	–	6
Florida	3	–	5	4	–	7
Vanderbilt	1	–	7	5	–	7
Tennessee	0	–	8	4	–	8
Western Division
No. 10 Auburn xy	7	–	1	10	–	4
No. 1 Alabama x#^	7	–	1	13	–	1
No. 18 LSU	6	–	2	9	–	4
No. 19 Mississippi State	4	–	4	9	–	4
Texas A&M	4	–	4	7	–	6
Ole Miss*	3	–	5	6	–	6
Arkansas	1	–	7	4	–	8
Championship: Georgia 28, Auburn 7
# – College Football Playoff champion; ^ – College Football Playoff participant; $ – Conference champion; x – Division champion/co-champions; y – Championship game participant; * Ole Miss ineligible for postseason due to NCAA sanctions; Rankings from AP Poll

The 2017 Kentucky Wildcats football team represented the University of Kentucky in the 2017 NCAA Division I FBS football season. The Wildcats played their home games at Kroger Field in Lexington, Kentucky. Kentucky played as a member of the Eastern Division of the Southeastern Conference. They were led by fifth-year head coach Mark Stoops. They finished the season 7–6, 4–4 in SEC play to finish in a tie for third place in the Eastern Division. They were invited to the Music City Bowl where they lost to Northwestern.

== Offseason ==
=== Spring Game ===
The spring game took place on April 14, in Lexington.

Date	Time	Spring Game	Site	TV	Result	Attendance
April 14	7:30 p.m.	Blue vs. White	Kroger Field • Lexington, KY	SEC Network	31–14 Blue	37,172

=== Departures ===
Name	Number	Pos.	Height	Weight	Year	Hometown	Notes
Jeff Badet	#13	WR	6'0"	182	Junior	Orlando, FL	Transferred to Oklahoma
Alvonte Bell	#92	DE	6'5"	260	Junior	Miramar, FL	Kicked off team
Tanner Fink	#49	TE	6'2"	251	Senior	Louisville, KY	Graduated
Nico Firios	#40	LB	6'2"	245	Sophomore	Longwood, FL	Transferred
Jabari Greenwood	#8	WR	6'3"	195	Sophomore	Washington D.C.	Transferred
J.D. Harmon	#11	DB	6'2"	200	Senior	Paducah, KY	Graduated
Jojo Kemp	#3	RB	5'10"	200	Senior	DeLand, FL	Graduated
De'Niro Laster	#44	LB	6'4"	241	Junior	Cleveland Heights, OH	Transferred
Blake McClain	#24	DB	5'11"	200	Senior	Winter Park, FL	Graduated
Marcus McWilson	#15	DB	6'0"	210	Senior	Youngstown, OH	Graduated
Courtney Miggins	#94	DT	6'5"	285	Senior	Lithonia, GA	Graduated
Zach Myers	#57	C	6'3"	305	Senior	Miamisburg, OH	Graduated
Ryan Timmons	#1	WR	5'10"	198	Senior	Frankfort, KY	Graduated
Jon Toth	#72	C	6'5"	310	Senior	Indianapolis, IN	Graduated
Roland Walder	#33	LB	6'3"	215	Freshman	Dayton, OH	Transferred
Kobie Walker	#8	LB	6'3"	215	Sophomore	Baltimore, MD	Transferred
Stanley Williams	#18	RB	5'9"	196	Junior	Monroe, GA	Entered 2017 NFL draft
Zane Williams	#78	DT	6'4"	290	Senior	Lexington, KY	Graduated

=== 2017 signing class ===
Prior to National Signing Day on February 1, 2017, seven players enrolled for the spring semester in order to participate in spring practice and included six former high school seniors and one junior college transfer. On National Signing Day, Kentucky signed an additional seventeen players out of high school and junior college that completed the 2017 recruiting class.

College recruiting information (2017)
Name	Hometown	School	Height	Weight	40^{‡}	Commit date
Abule Abadi-Fitzgerald #54 DE	Lakeland, FL	Lakeland Christian	6 ft 7 in (2.01 m)	245 lb (111 kg)		
Abule Abadi-Fitzgerald #54 DE	Recruit ratings: No ratings found					
Tyrell Ajian #17 ATH	Mansfield, OH	Madison High School	6 ft 1 in (1.85 m)	185 lb (84 kg)		
Tyrell Ajian #17 ATH	Recruit ratings: No ratings found					
Josh Ali #54 WR	Hollywood, FL	Chaminade-Madonna Prep	6 ft 0 in (1.83 m)	180 lb (82 kg)		
Josh Ali #54 WR	Recruit ratings: No ratings found					
Quinton Bohanna #69 DT	Cordova, TN	Cordova High School	6 ft 4 in (1.93 m)	320 lb (150 kg)		
Quinton Bohanna #69 DT	Recruit ratings: No ratings found					
Lynn Bowden #4 ATH	Youngstown, OH	Warren G. Harding High School	6 ft 1 in (1.85 m)	185 lb (84 kg)		
Lynn Bowden #4 ATH	Recruit ratings: No ratings found					
Danny Clark #15 QB	Columbus, OH	Archbishop Hoban High School	6 ft 2 in (1.88 m)	230 lb (100 kg)		
Danny Clark #15 QB	Recruit ratings: No ratings found					
Yusuf Corker #36 DB	McDonough, GA	Woodland High School	6 ft 0 in (1.83 m)	183 lb (83 kg)		
Yusuf Corker #36 DB	Recruit ratings: No ratings found					
Jamin Davis #60 LB	Ludowici, GA	Long County High School	6 ft 4 in (1.93 m)	210 lb (95 kg)		
Jamin Davis #60 LB	Recruit ratings: No ratings found					
Sebastien Dolcine #39 OG	Hollywood, FL	Miramar High School	6 ft 5 in (1.96 m)	295 lb (134 kg)		
Sebastien Dolcine #39 OG	Recruit ratings: No ratings found					
Cedrick Dort #157 DB	Palm Beach Gardens, FL	William T. Dwyer High School	5 ft 11 in (1.80 m)	170 lb (77 kg)		
Cedrick Dort #157 DB	Recruit ratings: No ratings found					
Austin Dotson #142 OT	Belfry, KY	Belfry High School	6 ft 6 in (1.98 m)	305 lb (138 kg)		
Austin Dotson #142 OT	Recruit ratings: No ratings found					
Isaiah Epps #206 WR	Jenks, OK	Jenks High School	6 ft 3 in (1.91 m)	185 lb (84 kg)		
Isaiah Epps #206 WR	Recruit ratings: No ratings found					
Phil Hoskins #6 DT (JUCO)	Toledo, OH	Highland Community College	6 ft 5 in (1.96 m)	280 lb (130 kg)		
Phil Hoskins #6 DT (JUCO)	Recruit ratings: No ratings found					
Lonnie Johnson Jr. #5 S (JUCO)	Gary, IN	Garden City Community College	6 ft 3 in (1.91 m)	215 lb (98 kg)		
Lonnie Johnson Jr. #5 S (JUCO)	Recruit ratings: No ratings found					
Alex King #39 DE	Mason, OH	Mason High School	6 ft 3 in (1.91 m)	225 lb (102 kg)		
Alex King #39 DE	Recruit ratings: No ratings found					
Bryant Koback #34 RB	Holland, OH	Springfield High School	6 ft 0 in (1.83 m)	200 lb (91 kg)		
Bryant Koback #34 RB	Recruit ratings: No ratings found					
Michael Nesbitt #83 DB	Fort Lauderdale, FL	Boyd H. Anderson High School	6 ft 0 in (1.83 m)	185 lb (84 kg)		
Michael Nesbitt #83 DB	Recruit ratings: No ratings found					
Josh Paschal #11 DE	Olney, MD	Our Lady of Good Counsel High School	6 ft 3 in (1.91 m)	270 lb (120 kg)		
Josh Paschal #11 DE	Recruit ratings: No ratings found					
Javonte Richardson #48 WR	Maple Heights, OH	Maple Heights High School	6 ft 4 in (1.93 m)	230 lb (100 kg)		
Javonte Richardson #48 WR	Recruit ratings: No ratings found					
Clevan Thomas #103 WR	Miami, FL	Charles W. Flanagan High School	5 ft 11 in (1.80 m)	190 lb (86 kg)		
Clevan Thomas #103 WR	Recruit ratings: No ratings found					
Naasir Watkins #103 OT	Olney, MD	Our Lady of Good Counsel High School	6 ft 6 in (1.98 m)	300 lb (140 kg)		
Naasir Watkins #103 OT	Recruit ratings: No ratings found					
Chris Whittaker #65 DE	Hollywood, FL	Chaminade-Madonna Prep	6 ft 3 in (1.91 m)	260 lb (120 kg)		
Chris Whittaker #65 DE	Recruit ratings: No ratings found					
Walker Wood #20 QB	Lexington, KY	Lafayette High School	6 ft 1 in (1.85 m)	190 lb (86 kg)		
Walker Wood #20 QB	Recruit ratings: No ratings found					
Jordan Wright #28 DE	Fort Lauderdale, FL	Dillard High School	6 ft 3 in (1.91 m)	330 lb (150 kg)		
Jordan Wright #28 DE	Recruit ratings: No ratings found					
Overall recruit ranking:
Note: In many cases, Scout, Rivals, 247Sports, On3, and ESPN may conflict in their listings of height and weight.; In these cases, the average was taken. ESPN grades are on a 100-point scale.; Sources: "2017 Kentucky Football Commitment List". Rivals.; "2017 Team Ranking". Rivals.com.; "2017 Kentucky Wildcats football team". 247Sports.

== Personnel ==
=== Coaching staff ===
Kentucky head coach Mark Stoops enters his fifth season as the Wildcat's head coach for the 2017 season. During his previous four seasons he led the Wildcats to an overall record of 19 wins and 30 losses.

On January 18, 2017, Defensive Coordinator D.J. Eliot announced he would not return to the program for the 2017 season as the defensive coordinator to instead continue his career at Colorado. In his place Kentucky promoted special teams coordinator Matt House as Defensive Coordinator at Kentucky.

Name	Position	Consecutive season at Kentucky in current position
Mark Stoops	Head coach	5th
Eddie Gran	Offensive coordinator, Running backs	2nd
Matt House	Defensive coordinator, Inside linebackers	1st
Steve Clinkscale	Defensive backs	2nd
Derrick LeBlanc	Defensive line	1st
Lamar Thomas	Wide receivers	2nd
Vince Marrow	Tight ends, Recruiting coordinator	5th
John Schlarman	Offensive line	5th
Darin Hinshaw	Quarterbacks	2nd
Dean Hood	Special teams	1st
Corey Edmond	Strength and conditioning	1st

=== Roster ===
2017 Kentucky Wildcats football team roster
Players
Coaches
Offense

Pos.	#	Name	Class
WR	1	Lynn Bowden	Fr
WR	2	Dorian Baker (injured)	Sr
RB	3	Jojo Kemp	Sr
WR	6	Blake Bone	Sr
QB	7	Drew Barker	Jr
WR	9	Garrett Johnson	Sr
RB	10	A. J. Rose	RFr
WR	11	Tavin Richardson	So
QB	12	Gunnar Hoak	RFr
QB	13	Danny Clark	Fr
QB	14	Luke Wright	Jr
QB	15	Stephen Johnson	Sr
QB	17	Walker Wood	Fr
WR	18	Clevan Thomas	Fr
WR	19	Kayaune Ross	Jr
WR	20	Ryan Kendall	Jr
RB	22	Sihiem King	Jr
WR	23	Brayden Berezowitz	RFr
RB	24	Bryant Koback	Fr
RB	25	Harold Turks	RFr
RB	26	Benny Snell	So
WR	27	Bryan Berezowitz	RFr
RB	28	Zach Johnson	RFr
WR	31	David Bouvier	Jr
RB	32	William Mahone	Sr
WR	42	Kynan Smith	Fr
FB	48	Will Collins	Sr
TE	49	Tanner Fink	Sr
C	52	Drake Jackson	RFr
G	55	David Baumer	Jr
G	61	Austin Dotson	Fr
G	62	Dylan Greenburg	Sr
G	64	George Asafo-Adjei	Jr
G	65	Jervontius Stallings	Jr
OT	66	Naasir Watkins	Fr
OT	67	Landon Young	So
G	68	Nick Haynes	Sr
G	71	Logan Stenberg	So
G	72	E.J. Price	So
OT	73	Kyle Meadows	Sr
G	74	Cole Mosier (injured)	Sr
OT	75	Tate Leavitt	Jr
OT	76	Sebastien Dolcine	Fr
OT	77	Mason Wolfe	RFr
OT	79	Luke Fortner	RFr
WR	80	JaVonte Richardson	Fr
WR	81	Isaiah Epps	Fr
WR	82	Josh Ali	Fr
TE	83	Justin Rigg	So
WR	84	Charles Moushey	Sr
TE	85	Greg Hart	Sr
TE	86	Darryl Long	So
TE	87	C. J. Conrad	Jr
WR	88	Charles Walker	Sr

Defense

Pos.	#	Name	Class
CB	3	Jordan Griffin	So
DE	4	Josh Paschal	Fr
CB	5	Kendall Randolph	Sr
S	7	Mike Edwards	Jr
CB	8	Derrick Baity	Jr
CB	9	Davonte Robinson	RFr
CB	13	Zy'Aire Hughes	RFr
LB	15	Jordan Wright	Fr
S	16	Marcus Walker	So
CB	17	Tobias Gilliam	RFr
DE	20	Kengera Daniel	Jr
CB	21	Chris Westry	Jr
DB	23	Tyrell Ajian	Fr
S	25	Darius West	Jr
DB	26	Jack Jackson	RFr
DB	26	Michael Nesbitt	Fr
DB	27	Cedrick Dort	Fr
CB	29	Yusuf Corker	Fr
CB	30	Isaiah Brown	Fr
LB	31	Jamar Watkins	RFr
LB	32	Eli Brown	So
LB	34	Jordan Jones	Jr
DE	35	Denzil Ware	Jr
DT	36	Jacob Hyde	Sr
LB	37	Spencer Foy	Jr
LB	38	William Nalty	Fr
LB	39	Elijah Barnett	So
LB	41	Josh Allen	Jr
LB	43	Logan Blue	Jr
LB	44	Jamin Davis	Fr
LB	45	Jaylin Bannerman	RFr
LB	46	Drew Schlegel	RFr
LB	47	Jordan Bonner	Jr
LB	48	Brett Slusher	So
LB	51	Courtney Love	Sr
LB	56	Kash Daniel	So
LB	58	Alex King	Fr
DT	59	Kordell Looney	RFr
DE	60	Calvin Taylor	So
DT	69	Matt Elam	Sr
DT	77	Naquez Pringle	Sr
DE	90	T. J. Carter	So
DE	91	Kevin Kirby	Fr
DT	92	Phil Hoskins	Fr
DT	93	Ja'Quize Cross	RFr
DT	95	Quinton Bohanna	Fr
DE	96	Abule Abadi-Fitzgerald	Fr
DE	97	Chris Whittaker	Fr
DE	98	Tymere Dubose	Jr
DT	99	Adrian Middleton	Jr

Special teams

Pos.	#	Name	Class
LS	42	Tristan Yeomans	Jr
LS	53	Blake Best	So
P	86	Grant McKinniss	So
P	91	Tyler Pack	RFr
P	93	Matt Panton	Sr
PK	95	Miles Butler	Jr
PK	99	Austin MacGinnis	Sr

Head coach

- Mark Stoops

Coordinators/assistant coaches

- Eddie Gran
  Offensive coordinator/running backs
- Darin Hinshaw
  Quarterbacks coach
- Lamar Thomas
  Wide receivers
- Vince Marrow
  Tight ends
- John Schlarman
  Offensive line
- Matt House
  Defensive coordinator/linebackers
- Derrick LeBlanc
  Defensive line
- Steve Clinkscale
  Defensive backs

Legend

- (C) Team captain
- (S) Suspended
- (I) Ineligible
- Injured
- Redshirt

Roster
Last update: August 1, 2017

== Schedule and results ==
The Wildcats' 2017 schedule consisted of seven home games and five away games. Kentucky hosted three of its four non-conference games—against Eastern Kentucky from the Ohio Valley Conference, Eastern Michigan from the Mid-American Conference, and Louisville from the ACC. They traveled to Southern Miss for their only road non-conference game. The Wildcats played eight conference games, hosting Florida, Missouri, Tennessee, and Ole Miss and traveling to South Carolina, Mississippi State, Vanderbilt, and Georgia.

Date	Time	Opponent	Site	TV	Result	Attendance
September 2	4:00 p.m.	at Southern Miss*	M. M. Roberts Stadium; Hattiesburg, MS	CBSSN	W 24–17	22,761
September 9	12:00 p.m.	Eastern Kentucky*	Kroger Field; Lexington, KY	SECN	W 27–16	54,868
September 16	7:30 p.m.	at South Carolina	Williams-Brice Stadium; Columbia, SC	SECN	W 23–13	82,493
September 23	7:30 p.m.	No. 20 Florida	Kroger Field; Lexington, KY (rivalry)	SECN	L 27–28	62,945
September 30	4:00 p.m.	Eastern Michigan*	Kroger Field; Lexington, KY	SECN	W 24–20	50,593
October 7	7:30 p.m.	Missouri^{†}	Kroger Field; Lexington, KY	SECN	W 40–34	57,476
October 21	3:00 p.m.	at Mississippi State	Davis Wade Stadium; Starkville, MS	SECN	L 7–45	58,963
October 28	7:30 p.m.	Tennessee	Kroger Field; Lexington, KY (rivalry)	SECN	W 29–26	57,543
November 4	4:00 p.m.	Ole Miss	Kroger Field; Lexington, KY	SECN	L 34–37	55,665
November 11	4:00 p.m.	at Vanderbilt	Vanderbilt Stadium; Nashville, TN (rivalry)	SECN	W 44–21	27,346
November 18	3:30 p.m.	at No. 7 Georgia	Sanford Stadium; Athens, GA (SEC Nation)	CBS	L 13–42	92,746
November 25	12:00 p.m.	Louisville*	Kroger Field; Lexington, KY (rivalry)	SECN	L 17–44	56,186
December 29	4:00 p.m.	vs. No. 23 Northwestern*	Nissan Stadium; Nashville, TN (Music City Bowl)	ESPN	L 23–24	48,675
*Non-conference game; ^{†}Homecoming; Rankings from AP Poll released prior to game; All times are in Central time

Schedule source:

== Game summaries ==
=== At Southern Miss ===
Kentucky vs. Southern Miss

Quarter	1	2	3	4	Total
Wildcats	0	14	10	0	24
Golden Eagles	0	3	7	7	17

at M. M. Roberts Stadium, Hattiesburg, Mississippi

- Date: September 2, 2017
- Game time: 4:00 p.m. EST
- Game weather: Temperature: 86 • Wind: N 4 mph • Weather: Mostly Sunny; 48%hum
- Game attendance: 22,761
- Referee: Hubert Owens
- TV: CBSSN

Game information

Second quarter

- 14:54 Kentucky – Stephen Johnson 8 yard run (Austin MacGinnis kick), Kentucky 7–0.
  Drive: 3 plays, 14 yards, 1:16
- 8:21 Southern Miss – Parker Shaunfield 22 yard field goal, Kentucky 7–3.
  Drive: 14 plays, 82 yards, 6:29
- 7:01 Kentucky – C.J. Conrad 23 yard pass from Stephen Johnson (Austin MacGinnis kick), Kentucky 14–3.
  Drive: 3 plays, 37 yards, 1:09

Third quarter

- 10:40 Southern Miss – Korey Robertson 42 yard pass from Kwadra Griggs (Parker Shaunfield kick), Kentucky 14–10.
  Drive: 6 plays, 85 yards, 2:12
- 2:03 Kentucky – Austin MacGinnis 41 yard field goal, Kentucky 17–10.
  Drive: 7 plays, 31 yards, 3:27
- 0:49 Kentucky – Denzil Ware 20 yard fumble return (Austin MacGinnis kick), Kentucky 24–10.
  Drive: 3 plays, -5 yards, 1:14

Fourth quarter

- 12:42 Southern Miss – Korey Robertson 26 yard pass from Kwadra Griggs (Parker Shaunfield kick), Kentucky 24–17.
  Drive: 11 plays, 75 yards, 3:07

Leading Passers

- USM – Kwadra Griggs, 15–26, 222 yards, 2 TD
- UK – Stephen Johnson, 11–20, 176 yards, 1 TD

Leading Rushers

- USM – Ito Smith, 16 carries, 37 yards
- UK – Benny Snell Jr., 20 carries, 67 yards

Leading Receivers

- USM – Korey Robertson, 7 receptions, 111 yards, 2 TD
- UK – C. J. Conrad, 3 receptions, 97 yards, 1 TD

Leading Tacklers

- USM – Tarvarius Moore, 8 tackles
- UK – Courtney Love, 9 tackles

=== Eastern Kentucky ===
Eastern Kentucky vs. Kentucky

Quarter	1	2	3	4	Total
Colonels	7	6	3	0	16
Wildcats	3	7	7	10	27

at Kroger Field, Lexington, Kentucky

- Date: September 9, 2017
- Game time: Noon EST
- Game weather: Temperature: 70 • Wind: 9 MPH E • Weather: Mostly sunny
- Game attendance: 54,868
- Referee: John McDaid
- TV: SEC Network

=== At South Carolina ===
Kentucky vs. South Carolina

Quarter	1	2	3	4	Total
Wildcats	7	7	3	6	23
Gamecocks	6	0	0	7	13

at Williams-Brice Stadium, Columbia, South Carolina

- Date: September 16, 2017
- Game time: 7:30pm EST
- Game weather: Temperature: 85 • Wind: NNE 4mph • Weather: Partly Cloudy
- Game attendance: 82,483
- Referee: Marc Curles
- TV: SEC Network

=== #20 Florida ===
#20 Florida vs. Kentucky

Quarter	1	2	3	4	Total
#20 Gators	0	14	0	14	28
Wildcats	7	7	10	3	27

at Kroger Field, Lexington, Kentucky

- Date: September 23, 2017
- Game time: 7:30 p.m. EST
- Game weather: Temperature: 80 °F (27 °C) • Wind: NE at 6 miles per hour (9.7 km/h) • Weather: Clear
- Game attendance: 62,945
- Referee: James Carter
- TV announcers (SEC Network): Tom Hart, Jordan Rodgers and Cole Cubelic

Game information

First Quarter

- Kentucky – Blake Bone 14-yard pass from Stephen Johnson (Austin MacGinnis kick), 5:06

Second Quarter

- Florida – Kadarius Toney 36-yard run (Eddy Piñeiro kick), 14:16
- Kentucky – Garrett Johnson 9-yard pass from Stephen Johnson (Austin MacGinnis kick), 7:24
- Florida – Tyrie Cleveland 45-yard pass from Feleipe Franks (Eddy Piñeiro kick), 3:16

Third Quarter

- Kentucky – C. J. Conrad 23-yard pass from Stephen Johnson (Austin MacGinnis kick), 12:11
- Kentucky – Austin MacGinnis 42-yard field goal, 5:54

Fourth Quarter

- Kentucky – Austin MacGinnis 50-yard field goal, 11:33
- Florida – Brandon Powell 6-yard run (Eddy Piñeiro kick), 7:58
- Florida – Freddie Swain 5-yard pass from Luke Del Rio (Eddy Piñeiro kick), 0:43

Passing leaders

- FLA – Feleipe Franks – 7/12, 85 yards, 1 touchdown
- KEN – Stephen Johnson – 17/25, 196 yards, 3 touchdowns

Rushing leaders

- FLA – Malik Davis – 21 carries, 93 yards
- KEN – Sihiem King – 5 carries, 63 yards

Receiving leaders

- FLA – Tyrie Cleveland – 4 receptions, 110 yards, 1 touchdown
- KEN – Garrett Johnson – 4 receptions, 56 yards, 1 touchdown

Tackling leaders

- FLA – David Reese – 8 tackles
- KEN – Mike Edwards – 11 tackles

=== Eastern Michigan ===
Eastern Michigan vs. Kentucky

Quarter	1	2	3	4	Total
Eagles	7	7	0	6	20
Wildcats	7	7	3	7	24

at Kroger Field, Lexington, Kentucky

- Date: September 30, 2017
- Game time: 4:00pm EST
- Game weather: Temperature: 71 • Wind: 12 ENE • Weather: Sunny, breezy
- Game attendance: 50,593
- Referee: Steve Marlowe
- TV: SEC Network

=== Missouri ===
Missouri vs. Kentucky

Quarter	1	2	3	4	Total
Tigers	0	14	13	7	34
Wildcats	10	10	7	13	40

at Kroger Field, Lexington, Kentucky

- Date: October 7, 2017
- Game time: 7:30pm EST
- Game weather: Temperature: 75 • Wind: S10 • Weather: Cloudy
- Game attendance: 57,476
- Referee: Ken Williamson
- TV: SEC Network

=== At Mississippi State ===
Kentucky vs. Mississippi State

Quarter	1	2	3	4	Total
Wildcats	0	7	0	0	7
Bulldogs	7	10	7	21	45

at Davis Wade Stadium, Starkville, Mississippi

- Date: October 21, 2017
- Game time: 4:00p.m. EST
- Game weather: Temperature:83 • Wind:SE @ 12 • Weather:partly cloudy
- Game attendance: 58,963
- Referee: John McDaid
- TV: SECN

=== Tennessee ===
Tennessee vs. Kentucky

Quarter	1	2	3	4	Total
Volunteers	6	14	3	3	26
Wildcats	7	14	0	8	29

at Kroger Field, Lexington, Kentucky

- Date: October 28, 2017
- Game time: 7:30 p.m. EST
- Game weather: Temperature:38 • Wind:5mph NW • Weather:Cloudy
- Game attendance: 57,543
- Referee: David Smith
- TV: SECN

=== Ole Miss ===
Ole Miss vs. Kentucky

Quarter	1	2	3	4	Total
Rebels	7	10	10	10	37
Wildcats	3	17	7	7	34

at Kroger Field, Lexington, Kentucky

- Date: November 4, 2017
- Game time: 4:00 p.m. EST
- Game weather: Temperature: 65 • Wind: 6mph S • Weather: Cloudy
- Game attendance: 55,665
- Referee: Marc Curles
- TV: SECN

=== At Vanderbilt ===
Kentucky vs. Vanderbilt

Quarter	1	2	3	4	Total
Wildcats	7	13	21	3	44
Commodores	7	0	14	0	21

at Vanderbilt Stadium, Nashville, Tennessee

- Date: November 11, 2017
- Game time: 4:00 p.m. EST
- Game weather: Temperature: 61 • Wind: S6 • Weather: Partly Cloudy
- Game attendance: 27,346
- Referee: David Smith
- TV: SECN

=== At #7 Georgia ===
Kentucky vs. #7 Georgia

Quarter	1	2	3	4	Total
Wildcats	6	0	7	0	13
#7 Bulldogs	7	14	7	14	42

at Sanford Stadium, Athens, Georgia

- Date: November 18, 2017
- Game time: 3:45 p.m. EST
- Game weather: Temperature: 68 • Wind: 9 SW • Weather: Overcast
- Game attendance: 92,746
- Referee: Hubert Owens
- TV: CBS

Game information

First quarter

- UK – Austin MacGinnis 37 yd field goal, 9:40. UK 3–0.
- UGA – Nick Chubb 8 yd run (Rodrigo Blankenship kick), 3:19. UGA 7–3.
- UK – Austin MacGinnis 35 field goal, 0:11. UGA 7–6.

Second quarter

- UGA – Javon Wims 27 yd pass from Jake Fromm (R. Blankenship kick), 4:56. UGA 14–6.
- UGA – Sony Michel 37 yd run (R. Blankenship kick), 1:51. UGA 21–6.

Third quarter

- UK – Benny Snell 1 yd run (A. MacGinnis kick), 11:29. UGA 21–13.
- UGA – Sony Michel 8 yd run (R. Blankenship kick), 8:16. UGA 28–13.

Fourth quarter

- UGA – Nick Cubb 55 yd run (R. Blankenship kick), 14:17. UGA 35–13.
- UGA – Sony Michel 4 yd run (R. Blankenship kick), 10:59. UGA 42–13.

Passing leaders

- UGA – Jake Fromm – 9/14, 123 yards, TD, INT
- UK – Stephen Johnson – 12/22, 138 yards

Rushing leaders

- UGA – Nick Chubb – 15 carries, 151 yards, 2 TD
- UK – Benny Snell – 22 carries, 94 yards, TD

Receiving leaders

- UGA – Javon Wims – 6 receptions, 83 yards, TD
- UK – Blake Bone – 1 reception, 45 yards

=== Louisville ===
Louisville at Kentucky

Quarter	1	2	3	4	Total
Cardinals	17	14	3	10	44
Wildcats	7	3	0	7	17

at Kroger Field • Lexington, Kentucky

- Date: November 25, 2017
- Game time: Noon EST
- Game weather: Sunny
- Game attendance: 56,816
- http://www.espn.com/college-football/boxscore?gameId=400933935

=== #23 Northwestern–Music City Bowl ===
Music City Bowl

Quarter	1	2	3	4	Total
UK Wildcats	7	0	7	9	23
#23 NU Wildcats	3	14	0	7	24

at Nissan Stadium • Nashville, Tennessee

- Date: December 29, 2017
- Game time: 4:00 p.m. EST
- Game attendance: 48,675
- Referee: Chris Coyte
- TV announcers (ESPN): Taylor Zarzour, Andre Ware and Olivia Harlan

Game information

First quarter

- 12:42 Kentucky – Benny Snell 3-yard run (Austin MacGinnis kick), Kentucky 7–0.
  Drive: 5 plays, 67 yards, 2:18
- 3:14 Northwestern – Charlie Kuhbander 33-yard field goal, Kentucky 7–3.
  Drive: 11 plays, 55 yards, 4:00

Second quarter

- 14:07 Northwestern – Justin Jackson 5-yard run (Charlie Kuhbander kick), Northwestern 10–7.
  Drive: 7 plays, 80 yards, 2:09
- 5:12 Northwestern – Justin Jackson 2-yard run (Charlie Kuhbander kick), Northwestern 17–7.
  Drive: 5 plays, 52 yards, 2:05

Third quarter

- 7:11 Kentucky – Stephen Johnson 3-yard run (Austin MacGinnis kick), Northwestern 17–14.
  Drive: 6 plays, 74 yards, 2:30

Fourth quarter

- 7:49 Northwestern – Kyle Queiro 26-yard interception return (Charlie Kuhbander kick), Northwestern 24–14.
  Drive: 2 plays, 14 yards, 0:35
- 4:24 Kentucky – Austin MacGinnis 48-yard field goal, Northwestern 24–17.
  Drive: 10 plays, 44 yards, 3:25
- 0:37 Kentucky – Stephen Johnson 9-yard run (2-point pass by Stephen Johnson failed), Northwestern 24–23.
  Drive: 4 plays, 39 yards, 1:54

Top passers

- UK – Stephen Johnson – 19/36, 257 yards, 2 INT
- NU – Matt Alviti – 4/11, 50 yards

Top rushers

- UK – Sihieim King – 7 carries, 30 yards
- NU – Justin Jackson – 32 carries, 157 yards, 2 TD

Top receivers

- UK – Tavin Richardson – 5 receptions, 89 yards
- NU – Charlie Fessler – 1 reception, 28 yards

== Awards and milestones ==
=== SEC honors ===
==== All-SEC First Team ====
- Benny Snell, RB (AP)

==== All-SEC Second Team ====
- Josh Allen, LB (AP)
- Benny Snell, RB (coaches)

==== Freshman All-SEC ====
- Lynn Bowden, RS

=== School records ===
- Most touchdowns scored in a season: 18, Benny Snell (ongoing)
- Most rushing touchdowns in a season: 18, Benny Snell (ongoing)
- Most career rushing touchdowns: 31, Benny Snell (ongoing)
- Most points scored in a season: 110, Benny Snell (ongoing)
- Most career points scored: 354, Austin MacGinnis (ongoing)
- Most field goals in a season: 21, Austin MacGinnis (ongoing; ties own record from 2016)
- Most career field goals: 71, Austin MacGinnis (ongoing)

=== National awards and honors ===
- Wuerffel Trophy — Courtney Love
