= 2018 NCAA football bowl games =

In college football, 2018 NCAA football bowl games may refer to:

- 2017–18 NCAA football bowl games, for games played in January 2018 as part of the 2017 season.
- 2018–19 NCAA football bowl games, for games played in December 2018 as part of the 2018 season.
