= 2017–18 NCAA football bowl games =

College football bowl games

- Season: 2017
- Regular season: August 26, 2017 – December 9, 2017
- Number of bowls: 41 (Note: 40 FBS bowl games, including the College Football Playoff National Championship Game, and 1 FCS bowl game.)
- All-star games: 4
- Bowl games: December 16, 2017 – January 8, 2018
- National Championship: 2018 College Football Playoff; National Championship
- Location of Championship: Mercedes-Benz Stadium; Atlanta
- Champions: Alabama Crimson Tide, UCF Knights (co champions)
- Bowl Challenge Cup winner: Big Ten
Bowl record by conference
Conference	Bowls	Record	Number of teams in final AP poll
SEC	11	5–6 (0.455)	5
ACC	10	4–6 (0.400)	4
Conference USA	9	4–5 (0.444)	0
Pac-12	9	1–8 (0.111)	3
Big Ten	8	7–1 (0.875)	5
Big 12	8	5–3 (0.625)	3
American	7	4–3 (0.571)	3
Mountain West	6	3–3 (0.500)	1
MAC	5	1–4 (0.200)	0
Sun Belt	5	4–1 (0.800)	0
Independents	2	2–0 (1.000)	1

The 2017–18 NCAA football bowl games was a series of college football bowl games which completed the 2017 NCAA Division I FBS football season. The games began on December 16, 2017, and aside from the all-star games ended with the 2018 College Football Playoff National Championship, which was played on January 8, 2018.

The total of 40 team-competitive bowls in FBS, including the national championship game, was one less than the previous year, with the folding of the Poinsettia Bowl. To fill the 78 available bowl slots, a total of 15 teams (19% of all participants) with non-winning (6–6) seasons participated in bowl games. This marks only the second time in seven years that no teams with losing seasons (6–7 or 5–7) had to be invited to fill available bowl berths.

== Schedule ==
The schedule for the 2017–18 bowl games is below. All times are EST (UTC−5).

=== College Football Playoff and Championship Game ===
The College Football Playoff system was used to determine a national champion of Division I FBS college football. A 13-member committee of experts ranked the top 25 teams in the nation after each of the last seven weeks of the 2017 season. The top four teams in the final ranking played a single-elimination semifinal round, with the winners advancing to the National Championship game.

The semifinal games were the Rose Bowl and the Sugar Bowl. Both were played on New Year's Day, as part of a yearly rotation of three pairs of six bowls, commonly referred to as the CFP New Year's Six bowl games. Their winners advanced to the 2018 College Football Playoff National Championship at Mercedes-Benz Stadium in Atlanta, Georgia, on January 8, 2018.

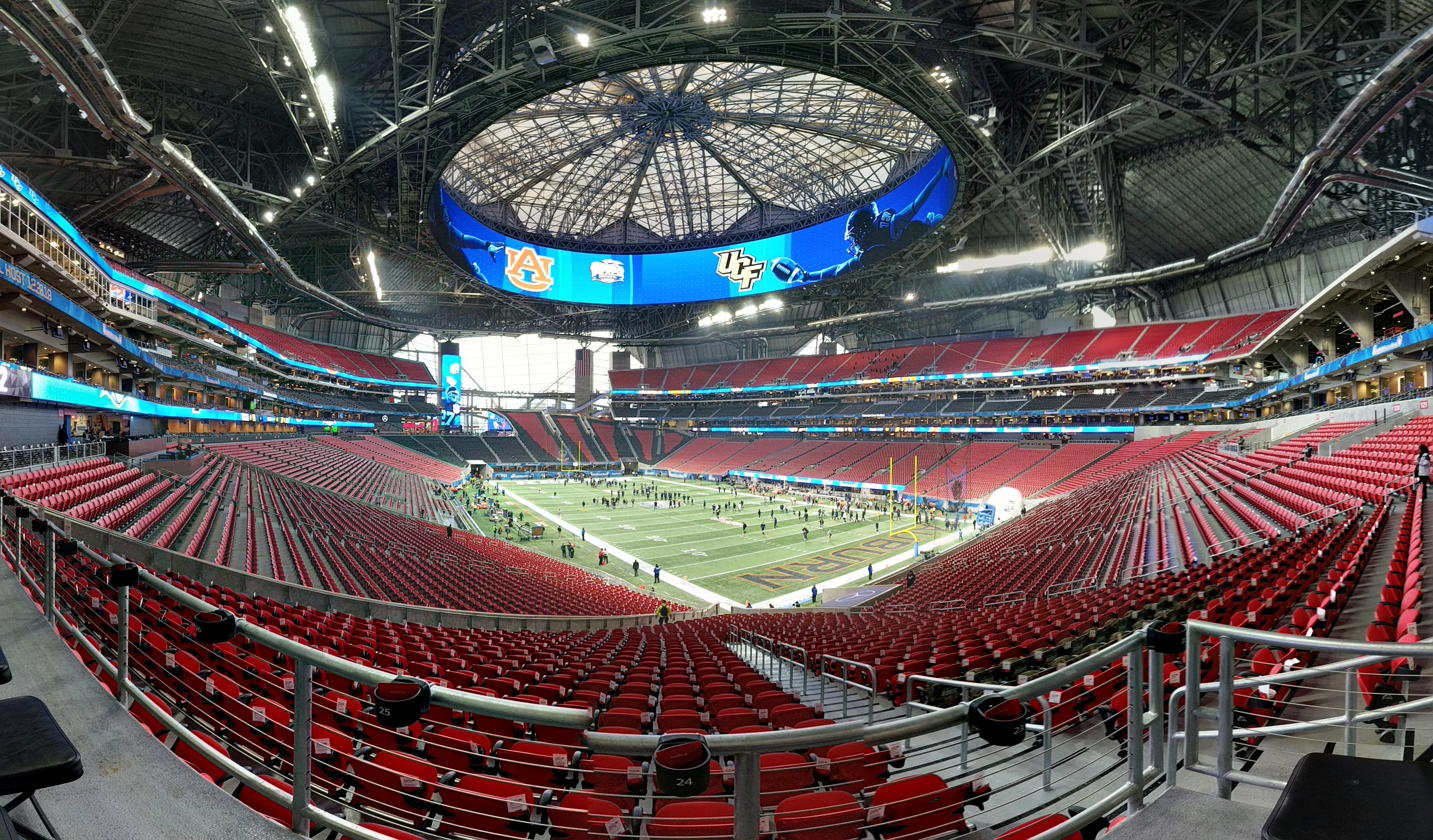
Mercedes-Benz Stadium, site of the National Championship game

Semifinals
January 1 – Sugar Bowl Mercedes-Benz Superdome, New Orleans
1	Clemson	6
4	Alabama	24
January 1 – Rose Bowl Rose Bowl Stadium, Pasadena
2	Oklahoma	48
3	Georgia (2OT)	54

Championship
January 8 – Championship Mercedes-Benz Stadium, Atlanta
4	Alabama (OT)	26
3	Georgia	23

Each of the games in the following table was televised by ESPN.

Date	Time (EST)	Game	Site	Teams	Affiliations	Results
Dec. 29	8:30 p.m.	Cotton Bowl Classic	AT&T Stadium; Arlington, Texas	No. 5 Ohio State Buckeyes (11–2); No. 8 USC Trojans (11–2)	Big Ten; Pac-12	Ohio State 24; USC 7
Dec. 30	4:00 p.m.	Fiesta Bowl	University of Phoenix Stadium; Glendale, Arizona	No. 9 Penn State Nittany Lions (10–2); No. 11 Washington Huskies (10–2)	Big Ten; Pac-12	Penn State 35; Washington 28
Dec. 30	8:00 p.m.	Orange Bowl	Hard Rock Stadium; Miami Gardens, Florida	No. 6 Wisconsin Badgers (12–1); No. 10 Miami (FL) Hurricanes (10–2)	Big Ten; ACC	Wisconsin 34; Miami (FL) 24
Jan. 1	12:30 p.m.	Peach Bowl	Mercedes-Benz Stadium; Atlanta, Georgia	No. 12 UCF Knights (12–0); No. 7 Auburn Tigers (10–3)	American; SEC	UCF 34; Auburn 27
Jan. 1	5:00 p.m.	Rose Bowl (Playoff Semifinal Game)	Rose Bowl; Pasadena, California	No. 3 Georgia Bulldogs (12–1); No. 2 Oklahoma Sooners (12–1)	SEC; Big 12	Georgia 54; Oklahoma 48 (2OT)
Jan. 1	8:45 p.m.	Sugar Bowl (Playoff Semifinal Game)	Mercedes-Benz Superdome; New Orleans, Louisiana	No. 4 Alabama Crimson Tide (11–1); No. 1 Clemson Tigers (12–1)	SEC; ACC	Alabama 24; Clemson 6
Jan. 8	8:00 p.m.	College Football Playoff National Championship (Rose Bowl Winner vs. Sugar Bowl Winner)	Mercedes-Benz Stadium; Atlanta, Georgia	No. 4 Alabama Crimson Tide (12–1); No. 3 Georgia Bulldogs (13–1)	SEC	Alabama 26; Georgia 23 (OT)

=== Non-CFP bowl games ===
On April 11, 2016, the NCAA announced a freeze on new bowl games until after the 2019 season. While bowl games had been the purview of only the very best teams for nearly a century, the NCAA had to lower its postseason eligibility criteria repeatedly (2006, 2009, 2010, 2012 and 2013), eventually allowing teams with losing seasons (5–7) to participate in bowls due to there being not enough bowl-eligible teams, while also having to allow teams from the same conference to meet in the 2015 Arizona Bowl due to the lack of eligible teams to meet its other tie-ins. For the 2017–18 bowl season, 62% of the 130 teams playing in Division I FBS were deemed eligible to participate in a bowl game, with 60% actually receiving invites to fill the 78 available slots.

For the 2017–18 bowl season, changes from the prior season's bowl games include the relocation of the Miami Beach Bowl to Frisco, Texas as the Frisco Bowl, and the discontinuation of the Poinsettia Bowl. The Russel Athletic Bowl was renamed the Camping World Bowl under a new sponsorship, and after going without a sponsor for two years, the St. Petersburg Bowl was renamed the Gasparilla Bowl (a name that pays homage to Tampa Bay's Gasparilla Pirate Festival).

Date	Time (EST)	Game	Site	Television	Teams	Affiliations	Results
Dec. 16	1:00 p.m.	New Orleans Bowl	Mercedes-Benz Superdome; New Orleans, Louisiana	ESPN	Troy Trojans (10–2); North Texas Mean Green (9–4)	Sun Belt; C–USA	Troy 50; North Texas 30
Dec. 16	2:30 p.m.	Cure Bowl	Camping World Stadium; Orlando, Florida	CBSSN	Georgia State Panthers (6–5); Western Kentucky Hilltoppers (6–6)	Sun Belt; C-USA	Georgia State 27; Western Kentucky 17
Dec. 16	3:30 p.m.	Las Vegas Bowl	Sam Boyd Stadium; Las Vegas, Nevada	ABC	No. 25 Boise State Broncos (10–3); Oregon Ducks (7–5)	MWC; Pac–12	Boise State 38; Oregon 28
Dec. 16	4:30 p.m.	New Mexico Bowl	Dreamstyle Stadium; Albuquerque, New Mexico	ESPN	Marshall Thundering Herd (7–5); Colorado State Rams (7–5)	C–USA; MWC	Marshall 31; Colorado State 28
Dec. 16	8:00 p.m.	Camellia Bowl	Cramton Bowl; Montgomery, Alabama	ESPN	Middle Tennessee Blue Raiders (6–6); Arkansas State Red Wolves (7–4)	C–USA; Sun Belt	Middle Tennessee 35; Arkansas State 30
Dec. 19	7:00 p.m.	Boca Raton Bowl	FAU Stadium; Boca Raton, Florida	ESPN	Florida Atlantic Owls (10–3); Akron Zips (7–6)	C–USA; MAC	Florida Atlantic 50; Akron 3
Dec. 20	8:00 p.m.	Frisco Bowl	Toyota Stadium; Frisco, Texas	ESPN	Louisiana Tech Bulldogs (6–6); SMU Mustangs (7–5)	C–USA; American	Louisiana Tech 51; SMU 10
Dec. 21	8:00 p.m.	Gasparilla Bowl	Tropicana Field; St. Petersburg, Florida	ESPN	Temple Owls (6–6); FIU Panthers (8–4)	American; C–USA	Temple 28; FIU 3
Dec. 22	12:30 p.m.	Bahamas Bowl	Thomas Robinson Stadium; Nassau, Bahamas	ESPN	Ohio Bobcats (8–4); UAB Blazers (8–4)	MAC; C–USA	Ohio 41; UAB 6
Dec. 22	4:00 p.m.	Famous Idaho Potato Bowl	Albertsons Stadium; Boise, Idaho	ESPN	Wyoming Cowboys (7–5); Central Michigan Chippewas (8–4)	MWC; MAC	Wyoming 37; Central Michigan 14
Dec. 23	12:00 p.m.	Birmingham Bowl	Legion Field; Birmingham, Alabama	ESPN	South Florida Bulls (9–2); Texas Tech Red Raiders (6–6)	American; Big 12	South Florida 38; Texas Tech 34
Dec. 23	3:30 p.m.	Armed Forces Bowl	Amon G. Carter Stadium; Fort Worth, Texas	ESPN	Army Black Knights (9–3); San Diego State Aztecs (10–2)	Independent; MWC	Army 42; San Diego State 35
Dec. 23	7:00 p.m.	Dollar General Bowl	Ladd–Peebles Stadium; Mobile, Alabama	ESPN	Appalachian State Mountaineers (8–4); Toledo Rockets (11–2)	Sun Belt; MAC	Appalachian State 34; Toledo 0
Dec. 24	8:30 p.m.	Hawaii Bowl	Aloha Stadium; Honolulu, Hawaii	ESPN	Fresno State Bulldogs (9–4); Houston Cougars (7–4)	MWC; American	Fresno State 33; Houston 27
Dec. 26	1:00 p.m.	Heart of Dallas Bowl	Cotton Bowl Stadium; Dallas, Texas	ESPN	Utah Utes (6–6); West Virginia Mountaineers (7–5)	Pac-12; Big 12	Utah 30; West Virginia 14
Dec. 26	5:15 p.m.	Quick Lane Bowl	Ford Field; Detroit, Michigan	ESPN	Duke Blue Devils (6–6); Northern Illinois Huskies (8–4)	ACC; MAC	Duke 36; Northern Illinois 14
Dec. 26	9:00 p.m.	Cactus Bowl	Chase Field; Phoenix, Arizona	ESPN	Kansas State Wildcats (7–5); UCLA Bruins (6–6)	Big 12; Pac-12	Kansas State 35; UCLA 17
Dec. 27	1:30 p.m.	Independence Bowl	Independence Stadium; Shreveport, Louisiana	ESPN	Florida State Seminoles (6–6); Southern Miss Golden Eagles (8–4)	ACC; C–USA	Florida State 42; Southern Miss 13
Dec. 27	5:15 p.m.	Pinstripe Bowl	Yankee Stadium; Bronx, New York	ESPN	Iowa Hawkeyes (7–5); Boston College Eagles (7–5)	Big Ten; ACC	Iowa 27; Boston College 20
Dec. 27	8:30 p.m.	Foster Farms Bowl	Levi's Stadium; Santa Clara, California	Fox	Purdue Boilermakers (6–6); Arizona Wildcats (7–5)	Big Ten; Pac-12	Purdue 38; Arizona 35
Dec. 27	9:00 p.m.	Texas Bowl	NRG Stadium; Houston, Texas	ESPN	Texas Longhorns (6–6); Missouri Tigers (7–5)	Big 12; SEC	Texas 33; Missouri 16
Dec. 28	1:30 p.m.	Military Bowl	Navy–Marine Corps Memorial Stadium; Annapolis, Maryland	ESPN	Navy Midshipmen (6–6); Virginia Cavaliers (6–6)	American; ACC	Navy 49; Virginia 7
Dec. 28	5:15 p.m.	Camping World Bowl	Camping World Stadium; Orlando, Florida	ESPN	No. 19 Oklahoma State Cowboys (9–3); No. 22 Virginia Tech Hokies (9–3)	Big 12; ACC	Oklahoma State 30; Virginia Tech 21
Dec. 28	9:00 p.m.	Alamo Bowl	Alamodome; San Antonio, Texas	ESPN	No. 15 TCU Horned Frogs (10–3); No. 13 Stanford Cardinal (9–4)	Big 12; Pac-12	TCU 39; Stanford 37
Dec. 28	9:00 p.m.	Holiday Bowl	SDCCU Stadium; San Diego, California	FS1	No. 16 Michigan State Spartans (9–3); No. 18 Washington State Cougars (9–3)	Big Ten; Pac-12	Michigan State 42; Washington State 17
Dec. 29	1:00 p.m.	Belk Bowl	Bank of America Stadium; Charlotte, North Carolina	ESPN	Wake Forest Demon Deacons (7–5); Texas A&M Aggies (7–5)	ACC; SEC	Wake Forest 55; Texas A&M 52
Dec. 29	3:00 p.m.	Sun Bowl	Sun Bowl Stadium; El Paso, Texas	CBS	No. 24 NC State Wolfpack (8–4); Arizona State Sun Devils (7–5)	ACC; Pac-12	NC State 52; Arizona State 31
Dec. 29	4:30 p.m.	Music City Bowl	Nissan Stadium; Nashville, Tennessee	ESPN	No. 21 Northwestern Wildcats (9–3); Kentucky Wildcats (7–5)	Big Ten; SEC	Northwestern 24; Kentucky 23
Dec. 29	5:30 p.m.	Arizona Bowl	Arizona Stadium; Tucson, Arizona	CBSSN	New Mexico State Aggies (6–6); Utah State Aggies (6–6)	Sun Belt; MWC	New Mexico State 26; Utah State 20 (OT)
Dec. 30	12:00 p.m.	TaxSlayer Bowl	EverBank Field; Jacksonville, Florida	ESPN	No. 23 Mississippi State Bulldogs (8–4); Louisville Cardinals (8–4)	SEC; ACC	Mississippi State 31; Louisville 27
Dec. 30	12:30 p.m.	Liberty Bowl	Liberty Bowl; Memphis, Tennessee	ABC	Iowa State Cyclones (7–5); No. 20 Memphis Tigers (10–2)	Big 12; American	Iowa State 21; Memphis 20
Jan. 1	12:00 p.m.	Outback Bowl	Raymond James Stadium; Tampa, Florida	ESPN2	South Carolina Gamecocks (8–4); Michigan Wolverines (8–4)	SEC; Big Ten	South Carolina 26; Michigan 19
Jan. 1	1:00 p.m.	Citrus Bowl	Camping World Stadium; Orlando, Florida	ABC	No. 14 Notre Dame Fighting Irish (9–3); No. 17 LSU Tigers (9–3)	Independent; SEC	Notre Dame 21; LSU 17

=== FCS bowl game ===
The FCS has one bowl game; they also have a championship bracket that began on November 25 and ended on January 6.

Date	Time (EST)	Game	Site	Television	Participants	Affiliations	Results
Dec. 16	12:00 p.m.	Celebration Bowl	Mercedes-Benz Stadium; Atlanta, Georgia	ABC	North Carolina A&T Aggies (11–0); Grambling State Tigers (11–1)	MEAC; SWAC	North Carolina A&T 21; Grambling State 14

=== All-star games ===
Date	Time (EST)	Game	Site	Television	Participants	Results
Jan. 14		Tropical Bowl	Daytona Stadium; Daytona Beach, Florida		American Team; National Team	American 29; National 20
Jan. 20	3:00 p.m.	East–West Shrine Game	Tropicana Field; St. Petersburg, Florida	NFL Network	East Team; West Team	West 14; East 10
Jan. 20	5:00 p.m.	NFLPA Collegiate Bowl	Rose Bowl; Pasadena, California	FS1	American Team; National Team	National 23; American 0
Jan. 27	2:30 p.m.	Senior Bowl	Ladd–Peebles Stadium; Mobile, Alabama	NFL Network	North Team; South Team	South 45; North 16

== Selection of the teams ==
=== CFP top 25 teams ===
On December 3, 2017, the College Football Playoff selection committee announced their final team rankings for the year.

In the fourth year of the College Football Playoff era, this was the first time that two of the four semifinalists were from the same conference (Georgia and Alabama of the SEC).

Rank	Team	W–L	Conference and standing	Bowl game
1	Clemson Tigers	12–1	ACC champions	Sugar Bowl (CFP semifinal)
2	Oklahoma Sooners	12–1	Big 12 champions	Rose Bowl (CFP semifinal)
3	Georgia Bulldogs	12–1	SEC champions	Rose Bowl (CFP semifinal)
4	Alabama Crimson Tide	11–1	SEC West Division co-champions	Sugar Bowl (CFP semifinal)
5	Ohio State Buckeyes	11–2	Big Ten champions	Cotton Bowl Classic (NY6)
6	Wisconsin Badgers	12–1	Big Ten West Division champions	Orange Bowl (NY6)
7	Auburn Tigers	10–3	SEC West Division co-champions	Peach Bowl (NY6)
8	USC Trojans	11–2	Pac-12 champions	Cotton Bowl Classic (NY6)
9	Penn State Nittany Lions	10–2	Big Ten East Division second place (tie)	Fiesta Bowl (NY6)
10	Miami (FL) Hurricanes	10–2	ACC Coastal Division champions	Orange Bowl (NY6)
11	Washington Huskies	10–2	Pac-12 North Division co-champions	Fiesta Bowl (NY6)
12	UCF Knights	12–0	AAC champions	Peach Bowl (NY6)
13	Stanford Cardinal	9–4	Pac-12 North Division co-champions	Alamo Bowl
14	Notre Dame Fighting Irish	9–3	Independent	Citrus Bowl
15	TCU Horned Frogs	10–3	Big 12 second place	Alamo Bowl
16	Michigan State Spartans	9–3	Big Ten East Division second place (tie)	Holiday Bowl
17	LSU Tigers	9–3	SEC West Division third place	Citrus Bowl
18	Washington State Cougars	9–3	Pac-12 North Division third place	Holiday Bowl
19	Oklahoma State Cowboys	9–3	Big 12 third place	Camping World Bowl
20	Memphis Tigers	10–2	AAC West Division champions	Liberty Bowl
21	Northwestern Wildcats	9–3	Big Ten West Division second place	Music City Bowl
22	Virginia Tech Hokies	9–3	ACC Coastal Division second place	Camping World Bowl
23	Mississippi State Bulldogs	8–4	SEC West Division fourth place (tie)	TaxSlayer Bowl
24	NC State Wolfpack	8–4	ACC Atlantic Division second place	Sun Bowl
25	Boise State Broncos	10–3	MWC champions	Las Vegas Bowl

=== Conference champions' bowl games ===
Three bowls featured two conference champions playing against each other—the Dollar General Bowl, Cotton Bowl Classic, and Rose Bowl. Rankings are per the above CFP standings.

Conference	Champion	W–L	Rank	Bowl game
ACC	Clemson Tigers	12–1	1	Sugar Bowl
American	UCF Knights	12–0	12	Peach Bowl
Big Ten	Ohio State Buckeyes	11–2	5	Cotton Bowl Classic
Big 12	Oklahoma Sooners	12–1	2	Rose Bowl
C-USA	Florida Atlantic Owls	10–3	—	Boca Raton Bowl
MAC	Toledo Rockets	11–2	—	Dollar General Bowl
Mountain West	Boise State Broncos	10–3	25	Las Vegas Bowl
Pac-12	USC Trojans	11–2	8	Cotton Bowl Classic
SEC	Georgia Bulldogs	12–1	3	Rose Bowl
Sun Belt†	Appalachian State Mountaineers	8–4	—	Dollar General Bowl
Sun Belt†	Troy Trojans	10–2	—	New Orleans Bowl

† denotes a conference that named co-champions

=== Bowl-eligible teams ===
- ACC (10): Boston College, Clemson, Duke, Florida State, (Note: In mid-December, multiple media sources reported that Florida State might not have met its bowl eligibility requirements. The team had a record of 6–6, with one of the wins – their 77–6 victory over Delaware State – against an FCS team. For such a game to count towards bowl eligibility, the FCS opponent must have used at least 90 percent of its allotted scholarships, and it was not clear that Delaware State had done so. But a few days later the Florida State administration issued a statement saying that Delaware State did in fact meet that threshold, once non-athletic scholarship funds were factored in.) Louisville, Miami (FL), NC State, Virginia, Virginia Tech, Wake Forest
- American (7): Houston, Memphis, Navy, SMU, South Florida, Temple, UCF
- Big Ten (8): Iowa, Michigan, Michigan State, Northwestern, Ohio State, Penn State, Purdue, Wisconsin
- Big 12 (8): Iowa State, Kansas State, Oklahoma, Oklahoma State, TCU, Texas, Texas Tech, West Virginia
- C-USA (10): FIU, Florida Atlantic, Louisiana Tech, Marshall, Middle Tennessee, North Texas, Southern Miss, UAB, UTSA, Western Kentucky
- MAC (7): Akron, Buffalo, Central Michigan, Northern Illinois, Ohio, Toledo, Western Michigan
- Mountain West (6): Boise State, Colorado State, Fresno State, San Diego State, Utah State, Wyoming
- Pac-12 (9): Arizona, Arizona State, Oregon, Stanford, UCLA, USC, Utah, Washington, Washington State
- SEC (9): Alabama, Auburn, Georgia, Kentucky, LSU, Mississippi State, Missouri, South Carolina, Texas A&M
- Sun Belt (5): Appalachian State, Arkansas State, Georgia State, New Mexico State, Troy
- Independent (2): Army, Notre Dame

Number of bowl berths available: 78
Number of bowl-eligible teams: 81

=== Bowl-eligible teams that did not receive a berth ===
As there are more bowl-eligible teams than bowl berths, three bowl-eligible teams did not receive a bowl berth:

- Buffalo (6–6)
- UTSA (6–5)
- Western Michigan (6–6)

=== Bowl-ineligible teams ===
- ACC (4): Georgia Tech, North Carolina, Pittsburgh, Syracuse
- American (5): Cincinnati, East Carolina, Tulane, Tulsa, UConn
- Big Ten (6): Illinois, Indiana, Maryland, Minnesota, Nebraska, Rutgers
- Big 12 (2): Baylor, Kansas
- C-USA (4): Charlotte, Old Dominion, Rice, UTEP
- MAC (5): Ball State, Bowling Green, Eastern Michigan, Kent State, Miami (OH)
- Mountain West (6): Air Force, Hawaii, Nevada, New Mexico, San Jose State, UNLV
- Pac-12 (3): California, Colorado, Oregon State
- SEC (5): Arkansas, Florida, Ole Miss, (Note: Despite winning six games for a .500 (6–6) regular-season record, Ole Miss is bowl-ineligible due to a self-imposed bowl ban.) Tennessee, Vanderbilt
- Sun Belt (7): Coastal Carolina, (Note: Coastal Carolina is in the second year of its two-year transition from FCS to FBS and is bowl-ineligible due to NCAA regulations, but would have been ineligible based on record in any case.) Georgia Southern, Idaho, Louisiana, Louisiana–Monroe, South Alabama, Texas State
- Independent (2): BYU, UMass

Number of bowl-ineligible teams: 49

== Television viewers and ratings ==
=== Non-CFP bowl games ===
Rank	Date	Matchup				Network	Viewers (millions)	TV rating	Game	Location
1	December 30, 2017, 8:00 ET	#10 Miami (FL)	24	#6 Wisconsin	34	ESPN	11.7	6.3	Capital One Orange Bowl	Hard Rock Stadium, Miami Gardens, FL
2	December 30, 2017, 4:00 ET	#11 Washington	28	#9 Penn State	35	ESPN	10.2	5.7	Playstation Fiesta Bowl	University of Phoenix Stadium, Glendale, AZ
3	December 29, 2017, 8:00 ET	#8 USC	7	#5 Ohio State	24	ESPN	9.5	5.3	Goodyear Cotton Bowl Classic	AT&T Stadium, Arlington, TX
4	January 1, 2018, 1:00 ET	#17 Notre Dame	21	#14 LSU	17	ABC	8.7	5.1	Citrus Bowl presented by Overton's	Camping World Stadium, Orlando, FL
5	January 1, 2018, 12:30 ET	#12 UCF	34	#7 Auburn	27	ESPN	8.4	4.6	Chick-fil-A Peach Bowl	Mercedes-Benz Stadium, Atlanta, GA
6	January 1, 2018, Noon ET	Michigan	19	South Carolina	26	ESPN2	5.1	2.8	Outback Bowl	Raymond James Stadium, Tampa, FL
7	December 29, 2017, 5:15 ET	Kentucky	23	#21 Northwestern	24	ESPN	4.6	2.8	Franklin American Mortgage Music City Bowl	Nissan Stadium, Nashville, TN
8	December 30, 2017, Noon ET	Louisville	27	#23 Mississippi State	31	ESPN	4.4	2.7	TaxSlayer Gator Bowl	EverBank Field, Jacksonville, FL
9	December 28, 2017, 9:00 ET	#15 TCU	39	#13 Stanford	37	ESPN	4.4	2.5	Valero Alamo Bowl	Alamodome, San Antonio, TX
10	December 28, 2018, 5:15 ET	#22 Virginia Tech	21	#19 Oklahoma State	30	ESPN	4.4	2.6	Camping World Bowl	Camping World Stadium, Orlando, FL

#CFP Rankings.

=== College Football Playoff ===
Game	Date	Matchup				Network	Viewers (millions)	TV rating	Location
Rose Bowl (semifinal)	January 1, 2018, 5:00 ET	#3 Georgia	54	#2 Oklahoma	48	ESPN	26.91	13.7	Rose Bowl, Pasadena, CA
Sugar Bowl (semifinal)	January 1, 2018, 8:45 ET	#4 Alabama	24	#1 Clemson	6	ESPN	21.47	11.4	Mercedes-Benz Superdome, New Orleans, LA
National Championship	January 8, 2018, 8:00 ET	#4 Alabama	26	#3 Georgia	23	ESPN	28.44	15.6	Mercedes-Benz Stadium, Atlanta, GA
