= 2017 Music City Bowl =

2017 Music City college football bowl game

2017 Franklin American Mortgage Music City Bowl
- 20th Music City Bowl
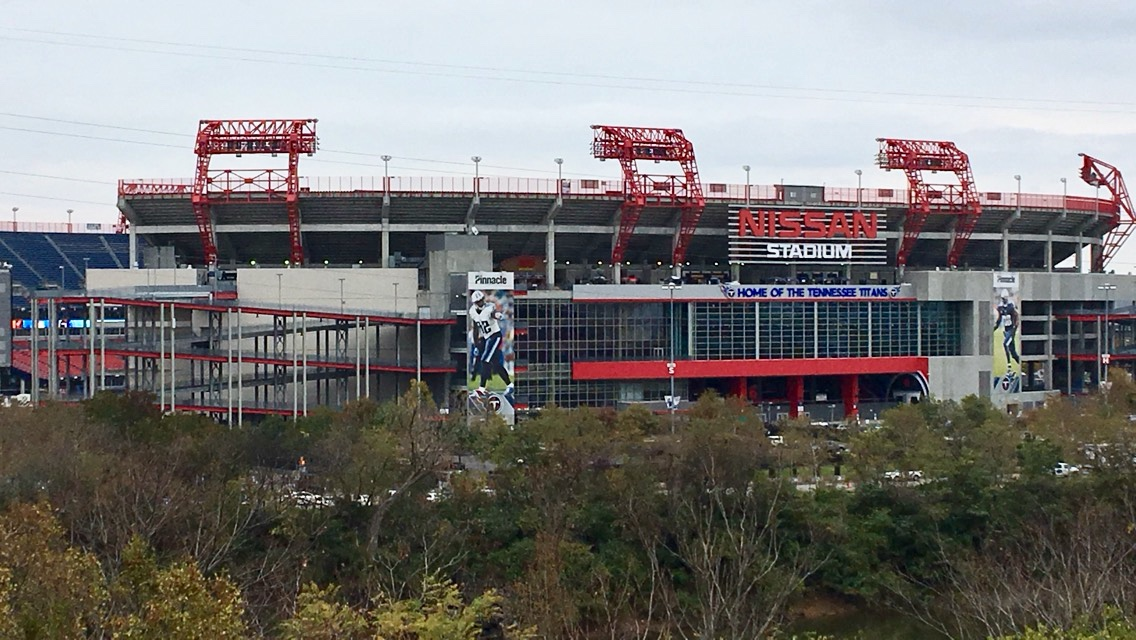
- Nissan Stadium in Nashville, Tennessee, hosted the Music City Bowl.
| Kentucky Wildcats | Northwestern Wildcats |
| (7–5) | (9–3) |
| SEC | Big Ten |
| 23 | 24 |
| Head coach: Mark Stoops | Head coach: Pat Fitzgerald |
| | AP / Coaches / CFP; 20 / 20 / 21 |
| | 1 | 2 | 3 | 4 | Total |
|---|---|---|---|---|---|
| Kentucky | 7 | 0 | 7 | 9 | 23 |
| Northwestern | 3 | 14 | 0 | 7 | 24 |
- Date: December 29, 2017
- Season: 2017
- Stadium: Nissan Stadium
- Location: Nashville, Tennessee
- MVP: Justin Jackson (RB, Northwestern)
- Favorite: Northwestern by 6.5
- National anthem: Trace Adkins
- Referee: Chris Coyte (Pac-12)
- Attendance: 48,675
- Payout: US$2,750,000

United States TV coverage
- Network: ESPN; ESPN Radio
- Announcers: TV: Taylor Zarzour, Andre Ware, Olivia Harlan; Radio: Mike Corey, Rene Ingoglia, Desmond Purnell

The 2017 Music City Bowl was a college football bowl game played on December 29, 2017, at Nissan Stadium in Nashville, Tennessee. It was one of the 2017–18 bowl games concluding the 2017 NCAA Division I FBS football season. The 20th annual Music City Bowl, the game was sponsored by Franklin American Mortgage and was officially known as the Franklin American Mortgage Music City Bowl.

The 2017 Music City Bowl featured the Kentucky Wildcats (7–5) from the Southeastern Conference (SEC) and the Northwestern Wildcats (9–3) from the Big Ten Conference. Northwestern beat Kentucky by a score of 24–23.

== Teams ==
This was only the second time that Kentucky and Northwestern had played against each other. Their previous match-up was on October 20, 1928, and was won by Northwestern, 7–0.

== Game summary ==
=== Scoring summary ===
Scoring summary

| Quarter | Time | Drive | | | Team | Scoring information | Score | |
| Quarter | Time | Plays | Yards | TOP | Team | Scoring information | UK | NU |
|---|---|---|---|---|---|---|---|---|
| 1 | 12:42 | 5 | 67 | 2:18 | UK | Benny Snell 3-yard touchdown run, Austin MacGinnis kick good | 7 | 0 |
| 1 | 03:14 | 11 | 55 | 4:00 | NU | 33-yard field goal by Charlie Kuhbander | 7 | 3 |
| 2 | 14:07 | 7 | 80 | 2:09 | NU | Justin Jackson 5-yard touchdown run, Charlie Kuhbander kick good | 7 | 10 |
| 2 | 05:12 | 5 | 52 | 2:05 | NU | Justin Jackson 2-yard touchdown run, Charlie Kuhbander kick good | 7 | 17 |
| 3 | 07:11 | 6 | 74 | 2:30 | UK | Stephen Johnson 3-yard touchdown run, Austin MacGinnis kick good | 14 | 17 |
| 4 | 07:49 | 2 | 14 | 0:35 | NU | Kyle Queiro 26-yard interception return, Charlie Kuhbander kick good | 14 | 24 |
| 4 | 04:24 | 10 | 44 | 3:25 | UK | 48-yard field goal by Austin MacGinnis | 17 | 24 |
| 4 | 00:37 | 4 | 39 | 1:54 | UK | Stephen Johnson 9-yard touchdown run, 2-point pass by Stephen Johnson failed | 23 | 24 |
| "TOP" = time of possession. For other American football terms, see Glossary of American football. | | | | | | | 23 | 24 |

=== Statistics ===
| | 1 | 2 | 3 | 4 | Total |
|---|---|---|---|---|---|
| UK Wildcats | 7 | 0 | 7 | 9 | 23 |
| NU Wildcats | 3 | 14 | 0 | 7 | 24 |

| Statistics | UK | NU |
|---|---|---|
| First downs | 17 | 20 |
| Plays–yards | 338 | 442 |
| Rushing–yards | 65 | 333 |
| Passing yards | 273 | 109 |
| Passing: Comp–Att–Int | 21–39–2 | 9–21–0 |
| Time of possession | 24:08 | 35:52 |

| Team | Category | Player | Statistics |
|---|---|---|---|
| UK | Passing | Stephen Johnson | 19–36 257 yards |
| UK | Rushing | Sihiem King | 30 yards |
| UK | Receiving | Tavin Richardson | 5 rec 89 yards |
| NU | Passing | Matt Alviti | 4–11 50 yards |
| NU | Rushing | Justin Jackson | 157 yards |
| NU | Receiving | Charlie Fessler | 1 rec 28 yards |
