= Wuerffel Trophy =

American football award

- Awarded for: The college football player "who best combines exemplary community service with athletic and academic achievement"
- Location: Fort Walton Beach, Florida
- Country: United States

History
- First award: 2005
- Most recent: Texas safety Michael Taaffe
- Website: http://www.wuerffeltrophy.org

The Wuerffel Trophy is an award given annually to the college football player "who best combines exemplary community service with athletic and academic achievement." The trophy, designed by W. Stanley Proctor and named in honor of former University of Florida quarterback Danny Wuerffel shows Wuerffel praying after scoring a touchdown.

== Winners ==
| Year | Player | Position | School | Ref |
|---|---|---|---|---|
| 2005 | Rudy Niswanger | C | LSU | |
| 2006 | Joel Penton | DT | Ohio State | |
| 2007 | Paul Smith | QB | Tulsa | |
| 2008 | Tim Tebow | QB | Florida | |
| 2009 | Tim Hiller | QB | Western Michigan | |
| 2010 | Sam Acho | DE | Texas | |
| 2011 | Barrett Jones | OT | Alabama | |
| 2012 | Matt Barkley | QB | USC | |
| 2013 | Gabe Ikard | C | Oklahoma | |
| 2014 | Deterrian Shackelford | MLB | Ole Miss | |
| 2015 | Ty Darlington | C | Oklahoma | |
| 2016 | Trevor Knight | QB | Texas A&M | |
| 2017 | Courtney Love | LB | Kentucky | |
| 2018 | Drue Tranquill | LB | Notre Dame | |
| 2019 | Jon Wassink | QB | Western Michigan | |
| 2020 | Teton Saltes | OT | New Mexico | |
| 2021 | Isaiah Sanders | QB | Stanford | |
| 2022 | Dillan Gibbons | G | Florida State | |
| 2023 | Ladd McConkey | WR | Georgia | |
| 2024 | Nick Dawkins | C | Penn State | |
| 2025 | Michael Taaffe | S | Texas | |
