= Derek Culver =

American basketball player (born 1998)

Free agent
- Position: Center

Personal information
- Born: May 24, 1998 (age 28) Youngstown, Ohio, U.S.
- Listed height: 6 ft 10 in (2.08 m)
- Listed weight: 255 lb (116 kg)

Career information
- High school: Warren G. Harding (Warren, Ohio); Brewster Academy (Wolfeboro, New Hampshire)
- College: West Virginia (2018–2021)
- NBA draft: 2021: undrafted
- Playing career: 2021–present

Career history
- 2021: Fort Wayne Mad Ants
- 2021–2022: Wisconsin Herd
- 2022: Delaware Blue Coats
- 2023: Mexico City Capitanes
- 2023: Lakeland Magic
- 2023: Delaware Blue Coats
- 2024: Rayos de Hermosillo
- 2024: Spartak Pleven
- 2024–2025: Anorthosis Ammochostou
- 2025: Suwon KT Sonicboom

Career highlights
- NBA G League champion (2023); First-team All-Big 12 (2021); Second-team All-Big 12 (2019); Big 12 All-Freshman Team (2019)
- Stats at Basketball Reference

Derek Taurhameyn Culver (born May 24, 1998) is an American professional basketball player who last played for the Suwon KT Sonicboom of the Korean Basketball League (KBL). He played college basketball for the West Virginia Mountaineers.

== Early life ==
Culver grew up in Youngstown, Ohio, which he called "a violent place, there’s really not a lot going on there." He attended Warren G. Harding High School in Warren, Ohio and was coached by Andy Vlajkovich. As a junior, he averaged 16 points and 10 rebounds per game, leading his team to a Division I district title and the regional semifinals. Culver was dismissed from the team midway through his senior season for undisclosed reasons. He played a postgraduate year at Brewster Academy in Wolfeboro, New Hampshire. Culver averaged 14 points and 10 rebounds per game and earned First Team New England Preparatory School Athletic Council (NEPSAC) Class AAA selection. He led his team to the NEPSAC Class AAA regular season title. A consensus four-star recruit, he committed to play college basketball for West Virginia over offers from Arizona, Kansas and Indiana, among others.

== College career ==
Before playing for West Virginia, Culver was suspended indefinitely for violating team rules. He was reinstated after about one month. On February 4, 2019, Culver recorded a freshman season-high 23 points and 12 rebounds in an 81–50 loss to Texas Tech. On February 26, he posted 22 points and 21 rebounds in a 104–96 triple overtime win over TCU. He became the first West Virginia player to record at least 20 points and 20 rebounds in a game since Mo Robinson in 1977. As a freshman, Culver averaged 11.5 points and a team-high 9.9 rebounds, leading the Big 12 in rebounding during conference play. He was named to the Second Team All-Big 12 and was a unanimous Big 12 All-Freshman Team selection.

Entering his sophomore season, Culver was among 20 players named to the Kareem Abdul-Jabbar Award watch list. On December 1, 2019, he tallied a career-high 25 points and 11 rebounds off the bench in an 86–81 victory over Rhode Island. Culver was often tasked with defending smaller players and was sometimes benched in favor of a smaller lineup. As a sophomore, he averaged 10.4 points and 8.6 rebounds per game and was named to the All-Big 12 Honorable Mention.

Culver began his junior season by leading the Mountaineers to the Crossover Classic Championship. Culver averaged 15 points and 10 rebounds per game and was named MVP of the tournament. He finished his college career with 1,036 points and 799 rebounds.

On April 26, 2021, Athletes Sports Management announced that it had signed Culver, and the agency's president also said that he would not be returning to West Virginia for another season. Culver denied this on Instagram, and a spokesperson for the school said that he has not told the Mountaineers he was leaving. Later that day, Culver clarified all of the confusion and officially announced that he would forego his senior year and explore professional options. Culver went undrafted in the 2021 NBA Draft.

== Professional career ==
=== Fort Wayne Mad Ants (2021) ===
On October 15, 2021, Culver signed with the Indiana Pacers, but was waived the following day. He joined the Fort Wayne Mad Ants as an affiliate player. On November 2, Culver was waived before the season opener.

=== Wisconsin Herd (2021–2022) ===
On December 18, 2021, Culver was acquired by the Wisconsin Herd of the NBA G League. He was later waived on January 5, 2022.

=== Delaware Blue Coats (2022) ===
On November 4, 2022, Culver was named to the opening night roster for the Delaware Blue Coats. However, he was waived on December 3.

=== Mexico City Capitanes (2023) ===
On January 4, 2023, Culver was acquired by the Mexico City Capitanes. On February 14, 2023, Culver was waived. Four days later, he was acquired by the South Bay Lakers, but was waived five days later before playing for South Bay.

=== Lakeland Magic (2023) ===
On February 25, 2023, Culver was acquired by the Lakeland Magic. Two days later, he was waived, after appearing in one game.

=== Return to Delaware (2023) ===
On March 4, 2023, Culver was reacquired by the Delaware Blue Coats, and eventually helped the team win the NBA G League title. On October 29, he re-joined the Blue Coats, but was waived on December 27.

=== Rayos de Hermosillo (2024) ===
Culver joined the Rayos de Hermosillo of the Circuito de Baloncesto de la Costa del Pacífico (CIBACOPA) ahead of the 2024 CIBACOPA season.

=== Suwon KT Sonicboom (2025) ===
On March 26, 2025, Culver signed with the Suwon KT Sonicboom of the Korean Basketball League, replacing Jarell Martin.

== Career statistics ==
Legend
GP	Games played	GS	Games started	MPG	Minutes per game
FG%	Field goal percentage	3P%	3-point field goal percentage	FT%	Free throw percentage
RPG	Rebounds per game	APG	Assists per game	SPG	Steals per game
BPG	Blocks per game	PPG	Points per game	**Bold**	Career high

=== College ===
Year	Team	GP	GS	MPG	FG%	3P%	FT%	RPG	APG	SPG	BPG	PPG
2018–19	West Virginia	26	14	**27.0**	.456	.000	.585	**9.9**	**1.7**	.5	.7	11.5
2019–20	West Virginia	**31**	25	24.5	.457	.000	.517	8.6	**1.7**	**.8**	**.8**	10.4
2020–21	West Virginia	29	**28**	26.3	**.478**	—	**.624**	9.4	1.1	**.8**	**.8**	**14.3**
Career		86	67	25.9	.465	.000	.576	9.3	1.5	.7	.8	12.0

== Personal life ==
Culver's cousin Lynn Bowden played quarterback and wide receiver at Kentucky and was drafted by the Las Vegas Raiders and then traded to the Miami Dolphins where he has been used primarily as a wide receiver along with the ability to be used as a "utility player" as well.
