= 2017 New Orleans Bowl =

2017 R+L Carriers New Orleans Bowl
- 17th New Orleans Bowl
Troy Trojans	North Texas Mean Green
(10–2)	(9–4)
Sun Belt	C-USA
50	30
Head coach: Neal Brown	Head coach: Seth Littrell
	1	2	3	4	Total
Troy	15	7	21	7	50
North Texas	7	13	3	7	30
- Date: December 16, 2017
- Season: 2017
- Stadium: Mercedes-Benz Superdome
- Location: New Orleans
- MVP: Troy QB Brandon Silvers
- National anthem: Gregory Afek
- Referee: David Alvarez (Mtn. West)
- Halftime show: Troy University "Sound of the South" marching band
- Attendance: 24,904
- Payout: US$925,000

United States TV coverage
- Network: ESPN; ESPN Radio
- Announcers: Jason Benetti, Kelly Stouffer, Kris Budden

The 2017 New Orleans Bowl was a college football bowl game played on December 16, 2017, at the Mercedes-Benz Superdome in New Orleans, Louisiana, United States. The 17th edition of the New Orleans Bowl featured the Sun Belt Conference co-champion Troy Trojans against the Conference USA West Division champion North Texas Mean Green. It began at 1 p.m. EST and aired on ESPN. It was one of the 2017–18 bowl games that concluded the 2017 FBS football season. Sponsored by freight company R+L Carriers, the game was officially known as the R+L Carriers New Orleans Bowl. Troy defeated North Texas, 50–30.

== Teams ==
The game featured the Troy Trojans against the North Texas Mean Green. It was the eleventh all-time meeting between the schools; with Troy's victory, it now leads the series 9–2. The Trojans and Mean Green played together in the Sun Belt from 2004 until 2012, when North Texas joined Conference USA.

=== Troy Trojans ===
This was the Trojans' fourth New Orleans Bowl; their record in the game is now 2–2, as they previously won the 2006 and 2010 editions of the game and lost in 2008.

=== North Texas Mean Green ===
This was the Mean Green's fifth New Orleans Bowl, moving them into a two-way tie with Southern Miss for most appearances in that game (not counting Louisiana–Lafayette's two vacated bowl wins). The Mean Green's New Orleans Bowl record is now 1–4, with their only win in the game coming in 2002 over Cincinnati. It was the Mean Green's first New Orleans Bowl as a representative of Conference USA; their four previous appearances had all been as a Sun Belt member. The Mean Green went 9–3 overall (7–1 in conference) in the regular season, losing to SMU (54–32), Iowa (31–14), and FAU (69–31). They lost again to FAU (41–17) in the C-USA title game to bring their record to 9–4 (7–2).

== Game summary ==
On Troy's 1st drive, they faced an early third down. QB Brandon Silvers found Damion Willis for the first down. Later in the drive, Silvers found Willis for a beautiful pass-and-catch and found Sam Letton down to the North Texas 1-yard line. Senior RB Josh Anderson scored from a yard out to give Troy a 7–0 lead. On North Texas' second play from scrimmage, Jamal Stadom sacked QB Mason Fine and forced a fumble which Troy recovered at the 14-yard line. It took Troy just two plays to score as Silvers found Willis for 8 yards, and Anderson scored again from 2 yards out. Troy went for a two-point conversion, and Silvers found John Johnson in the back of the end zone for a 15–0 lead. Troy forced a three-and-out and got the ball back. However, on third-and-7, Joshua Wheeler sacked Silvers and Troy had to punt to North Texas. Mason Fine led a drive in which he found Rico Bussey for a 12-yard TD. Brandon Silvers then led a drive in which he found Damion Willis for a 22–7 lead.

=== Scoring summary ===
Scoring summary

Quarter	Time	Drive			Team	Scoring information	Score	
Quarter	Time	Plays	Yards	TOP	Team	Scoring information	Troy	NT
1	10:55	9	80	4:05	Troy	Josh Anderson 1-yard touchdown run, Tyler Sumpter kick good	7	0
1	9:21	3	14	0:47	Troy	Josh Anderson 2-yard touchdown run, 2-point pass good	15	0
1	0:55	11	75	4:07	NT	Rico Bussey, Jr. 12-yard touchdown reception from Mason Fine, Trevor Moore kick good	15	7
2	14:24	5	81	1:31	Troy	Damion Willis 7-yard touchdown reception from Brandon Silvers, Tyler Sumpter kick good	22	7
2	5:49				NT	Fumble recovery returned 56 yards for touchdown by Colton McDonald, 2-point run failed	22	13
2	0:49	6	41	1:34	NT	Michael Lawrence 13-yard touchdown reception from Mason Fine, Trevor Moore kick good	22	20
3	13:33	3	27	0:48	Troy	Brandon Silvers 1-yard touchdown run, Tyler Sumpter kick good	29	20
3	10:28	5	92	2:04	Troy	Tevaris McCormick 59-yard touchdown reception from Brandon Silvers, Tyler Sumpter kick good	36	20
3	4:26	13	59	6:02	NT	24-yard field goal by Trevor Moore	36	23
3	2:02	2	13	0:31	Troy	John Johnson 20-yard touchdown reception from Brandon Silvers, Tyler Sumpter kick good	43	23
4	4:07	4	47	1:58	Troy	Damion Willis 10-yard touchdown reception from Brandon Silvers, Tyler Sumpter kick good	50	23
4	0:28	8	60	3:39	NT	Turner Smiley 17-yard touchdown reception from Mason Fine, Trevor Moore kick good	50	30
"TOP" = time of possession. For other American football terms, see Glossary of American football.							50	30

=== Statistics ===
	1	2	3	4	Total
Trojans	15	7	21	7	50
Mean Green	7	13	3	7	30

Statistics	Troy	NT
First downs	21	21
Total offense, plays–yards	69–435	79–295
Rushes-yards (net)	38–129	25–(-8)
Passing yards (net)	306	303
Passes, Comp–Att–Int	24–31–1	30–54–2
Time of Possession	29:33	30:27

Team	Category	Player	Statistics
Troy	Passing	Brandon Silvers	24/31, 305 yds, 4 TD, 1 INT
Troy	Rushing	Josh Anderson	22 car, 113 yds, 2 TD
Troy	Receiving	Damion Willis	11 rec, 135 yds, 2 TD
North Texas	Passing	Mason Fine	30/54, 303 yds, 3 TD, 2 INT
North Texas	Rushing	Evan Johnson	6 car, 26 yds
North Texas	Receiving	Michael Lawrence	6 rec, 70 yds, 1 TD
