= Shakur Brown =

American gridiron football player (born 1999)

Ottawa Redblacks
- Position: Defensive back
- Roster status: Practice roster
- CFL status: American

Personal information
- Born: April 1, 1999 (age 27); Detroit, Michigan, U.S.
- Listed height: 5 ft 10 in (1.78 m)
- Listed weight: 185 lb (84 kg)

Career information
- High school: Woodland (Stockbridge, Georgia)
- College: Michigan State
- NFL draft: 2021: undrafted

Career history
- Pittsburgh Steelers (2021)*; Kansas City Chiefs (2021)*; Detroit Lions (2021)*; Pittsburgh Maulers (2022); Tennessee Titans (2022)*; Arlington Renegades (2023); Hamilton Tiger-Cats (2024)*; Ottawa Redblacks (2025–present)*
- * Offseason or practice squad member only

Awards and highlights
- XFL champion (2023); First-team All-Big Ten (2020)
- Stats at Pro Football Reference
- Stats at CFL.ca

Shakur Brown (born April 1, 1999) is an American professional football defensive back. He played college football for the Michigan State Spartans.

== Early life ==
Brown grew up in Detroit, Michigan and his family decided to move to Georgia when he was 14 and he attended Woodland High School. Brown was rated a three-star recruit and committed to play college football at West Virginia over offers from Kentucky, Minnesota, Ole Miss, South Carolina and Tennessee but did not qualify academically initially. After being cleared by the NCAA, Brown committed to play at Michigan State.

== College career ==
Brown redshirted his true freshman season. As a redshirt freshman, he played in 12 of the Spartans' games as a reserve and intercepted a pass, which he returned 69 yards for a touchdown. Brown missed the first six games of his redshirt sophomore season due to injury. He finished his redshirt junior season with five interceptions and four passes broken up. Following the end of the season, Brown declared that he would be entering the 2021 NFL Draft.

== Professional career ==
Pre-draft measurables
Height	Weight	Arm length	Hand span	Wingspan	40-yard dash	10-yard split	20-yard split	20-yard shuttle	Three-cone drill	Vertical jump	Broad jump	Bench press
5 ft 9 3/4 in (1.77 m)	185 lb (84 kg)	30 in (0.76 m)	8 5/8 in (0.22 m)	5 ft 11 1/8 in (1.81 m)	4.64 s	1.65 s	2.65 s	4.25 s	7.08 s	35.5 in (0.90 m)	9 ft 8 in (2.95 m)	17 reps
All values from Pro Day

=== Pittsburgh Steelers ===
Brown signed with the Pittsburgh Steelers as an undrafted free agent on May 7, 2021. He was waived on August 28, 2021.

=== Kansas City Chiefs ===
On September 3, 2021, Brown was signed to the Kansas City Chiefs practice squad. He was released on September 11.

=== Detroit Lions ===
On October 15, 2021, Brown was signed to the Detroit Lions practice squad. He was released on October 30. He was re-signed on December 14. He was released on December 21.

=== Pittsburgh Maulers ===
Brown signed with the Pittsburgh Maulers of the United States Football League on April 22, 2022.

=== Tennessee Titans ===
On July 29, 2022, Brown signed with the Tennessee Titans. He was waived on August 22, 2022.

=== Arlington Renegades ===
On November 17, 2022, Brown was drafted by the Arlington Renegades of the XFL. He was placed on the reserve list by the team on May 8, 2023, and activated on May 16. He was not part of the roster after the 2024 UFL dispersal draft on January 15, 2024.

=== Hamilton Tiger-Cats ===
On April 9, 2024, Brown signed with the Hamilton Tiger-Cats of the Canadian Football League (CFL). He was released on June 2, 2024.

=== Ottawa Redblacks ===
On April 10, 2025, Brown signed with the Ottawa Redblacks. He was part of the final training camp cuts on May 31, 2025. He was later re-signed on July 9, 2025, to the team's practice roster.

On August 2, 2026, Brown was released by the Redblacks. He was resigned to the practice roster on August 14.
