= Courtney Love (American football) =

American football player and coach (born 1994)

Current position
- Title: Director of player development
- Team: Kentucky
- Conference: SEC

Biographical details
- Born: September 28, 1994 (age 31); Youngstown, Ohio, U.S.

Playing career
- 2013–2014: Nebraska
- 2015–2017: Kentucky
- Position: Linebacker

Coaching career (HC unless noted)
- 2018: Kentucky (GA)

Administrative career (AD unless noted)
- 2019–2024: Kentucky (Director of player development)
- 2026–present: Kentucky (Director of player development)

Accomplishments and honors

Awards
- Wuerffel Trophy (2017)

Courtney Love (born September 28, 1994) is an American football coach and former linebacker who is currently the director of player development for the University of Kentucky's football team. He also played college football at Kentucky, where he was the recipient of the Wuerffel Trophy in 2017.

== Playing career ==
=== Nebraska ===
Love initially committed to play college football at Nebraska, where fellow Cardinal Mooney alumnus Bo Pelini was the head coach. At Nebraska, he compiled 6 tackles in 2014 after redshirting his freshman year in 2013.

After Pelini was fired in 2014, Love announced his intention to transfer to Kentucky, citing wanting to be closer to his grandmother, as well as his connections to members of the coaching staff at Kentucky.

=== Kentucky ===
Love initially applied for a hardship waiver when transferring to Kentucky that would have allowed him to play immediately, but was denied and forced to sit out the 2015 season.

Despite sitting out the 2015 season, Love's impact on the program was not affected, as he was one of the players head coach Mark Stoops selected to attend the SEC Media Days in 2016 despite never playing a snap for the Wildcats at that point. In addition to attending media days, he was one of three players to help show off Kentucky's new uniforms and was seen to be the leader of the Wildcats defense.

Love was named the recipient of the Wuerffel Trophy in 2017, an award given to the college football player "who best combines exemplary community service with athletic and academic achievement." He finished his career at Kentucky with 168 tackles, 2 sacks, 3 fumble recoveries, and 1 forced fumble.

=== College statistics ===
Year	Team	Class	GP	Tackles					Def	Fumbles		
Year	Team	Class	GP	Solo	Ast	Total	TFL	Sacks	PD	FR	Yards	FF
2013	Nebraska	Freshman	Redshirt									
2014	Nebraska	(redshirt) Freshman	4	4	2	6	1.0	0.0	0	0	0	0
2015	Kentucky	(redshirt) Sophomore	Sat out due to NCAA transfer rules									
2016	Kentucky	(redshirt) Junior	13	39	37	76	1.0	1.0	1	1	0	1
2017	Kentucky	(redshirt) Senior	13	34	58	92	3.5	1.0	3	2	0	0
Career			30	77	97	174	5.5	2.0	4	3	0	1

== Coaching career ==
At the conclusion of his playing career, Love was hired as a graduate assistant at Kentucky in 2018. He was promoted to director of player development in 2019.

== Personal life ==
A native of Youngstown, Ohio, Love initially split time between his father and mother before later running away to permanently live with his father Cory, a former Marine who had served during the Gulf War. While playing at Kentucky, he volunteered at Amachi Central Kentucky, a mentoring program that pairs adults with children in Kentucky who have parents that are affected by or incarcerated in prison. Love was paired with Antonio McKinney, a boy whose father was incarcerated and quickly formed a bond with him, spending time with him between practice and classes.
