= 2017 Northwestern Wildcats football team =

American college football season

2017 Northwestern Wildcats football

Music City Bowl champion

Music City Bowl, W 24–23 vs. Kentucky
- Conference: Big Ten Conference
- West Division

Ranking
- Coaches: No. 17
- AP: No. 17
- Record: 10–3 (7–2 Big Ten)
- Head coach: Pat Fitzgerald (12th season)
- Offensive coordinator: Mick McCall (10th season)
- Offensive scheme: Spread
- Defensive coordinator: Mike Hankwitz (10th season)
- Base defense: Multiple 4–3
- Home stadium: Ryan Field

2017 Big Ten Conference football standings
	Conf.			Overall
Team	W		L	W		L
East Division
No. 5 Ohio State xy$	8	–	1	12	–	2
No. 15 Michigan State	7	–	2	10	–	3
No. 8 Penn State	7	–	2	11	–	2
Michigan	5	–	4	8	–	5
Rutgers	3	–	6	4	–	8
Indiana	2	–	7	5	–	7
Maryland	2	–	7	4	–	8
West Division
No. 7 Wisconsin xy	9	–	0	13	–	1
No. 17 Northwestern	7	–	2	10	–	3
Iowa	4	–	5	8	–	5
Purdue	4	–	5	7	–	6
Nebraska	3	–	6	4	–	8
Minnesota	2	–	7	5	–	7
Illinois	0	–	9	2	–	10
Championship: Ohio State 27, Wisconsin 21
$ – Conference champion; x – Division champion/co-champions; y – Championship game participant; Rankings from AP Poll

The 2017 Northwestern Wildcats football team represented Northwestern University during the 2017 NCAA Division I FBS football season. The Wildcats played their home games at Ryan Field in Evanston, Illinois, and competed in the West Division of the Big Ten Conference. They were led by 12th-year head coach Pat Fitzgerald. This was the Wildcats' fifth ten-win season, three of which were led by Pat Fitzgerald. They finished the season 10–3, 7–2 in Big Ten play to finish in second place in the West Division. They were invited to the Music City Bowl where they defeated Kentucky.

== Recruiting ==
=== Position key ===
Back	B	Center	C	Cornerback	CB	Defensive back	DB
Defensive end	DE	Defensive lineman	DL	Defensive tackle	DT	End	E
Fullback	FB	Guard	G	Halfback	HB	Kicker	K
Kickoff returner	KR	Offensive tackle	OT	Offensive lineman	OL	Linebacker	LB
Long snapper	LS	Punter	P	Punt returner	PR	Quarterback	QB
Running back	RB	Safety	S	Tight end	TE	Wide receiver	WR

=== Recruits ===
The Wildcats signed a total of 19 recruits.

College recruiting (2017)
Name	Hometown	School	Height	Weight	Commit date
Sam Gerak; C	Avon, Ohio	Avon HS	6 ft 3 in (1.91 m)	270 lb (120 kg)	Dec 21, 2015
Sam Gerak; C	Recruit ratings: Scout: Rivals: 247Sports: ESPN:				
Sam Miller; DT	Houston, Texas	Stratford HS	6 ft 3 in (1.91 m)	260 lb (120 kg)	Jan 24, 2016
Sam Miller; DT	Recruit ratings: Scout: Rivals: 247Sports: ESPN:				
Rashawn Slater; OG	Sugar Land, Texas	Clements HS	6 ft 3 in (1.91 m)	269 lb (122 kg)	Jan 27, 2016
Rashawn Slater; OG	Recruit ratings: Scout: Rivals: 247Sports: ESPN:				
Earnest Brown IV; DE	Denton, Texas	Ryan HS	6 ft 5 in (1.96 m)	240 lb (110 kg)	Mar 22, 2016
Earnest Brown IV; DE	Recruit ratings: Scout: Rivals: 247Sports: ESPN:				
Trevor Kent; DE	Pittsburg, Kansas	Pittsburg HS	6 ft 5 in (1.96 m)	253 lb (115 kg)	Mar 23, 2016
Trevor Kent; DE	Recruit ratings: Scout: Rivals: 247Sports: ESPN:				
Austin Hiller; S	Austin, Texas	Lake Travis HS	6 ft 1 in (1.85 m)	200 lb (91 kg)	Mar 24, 2016
Austin Hiller; S	Recruit ratings: Scout: Rivals: 247Sports: ESPN:				
Trey Pugh; TE	Plain City, Ohio	Jonathan Alder HS	6 ft 5 in (1.96 m)	225 lb (102 kg)	Apr 3, 2016
Trey Pugh; TE	Recruit ratings: Scout: Rivals: 247Sports: ESPN:				
Bryce Jackson; S	Denton, Texas	Guyer HS	6 ft 0 in (1.83 m)	181 lb (82 kg)	Apr 6, 2016
Bryce Jackson; S	Recruit ratings: Scout: Rivals: 247Sports: ESPN:				
Cameron Ruiz; CB	Lake Villa, Illinois	Lakes Community HS	5 ft 10 in (1.78 m)	165 lb (75 kg)	Apr 11, 2016
Cameron Ruiz; CB	Recruit ratings: Scout: Rivals: 247Sports: ESPN:				
Peter McIntyre; LB	Toledo, Ohio	St. John's Jesuit HS	6 ft 2 in (1.88 m)	213 lb (97 kg)	Apr 21, 2016
Peter McIntyre; LB	Recruit ratings: Scout: Rivals: 247Sports: ESPN:				
Andrew Marty; QB	Cincinnati, Ohio	Wyoming HS	6 ft 4 in (1.93 m)	200 lb (91 kg)	Apr 26, 2016
Andrew Marty; QB	Recruit ratings: Scout: Rivals: 247Sports: ESPN:				
J.R. Pace; S	Atlanta, Georgia	Woodward Academy	6 ft 1 in (1.85 m)	190 lb (86 kg)	May 15, 2016
J.R. Pace; S	Recruit ratings: Scout: Rivals: 247Sports: ESPN:				
Jace James; WR	Carol Stream, Illinois	Glenbard North HS	6 ft 0 in (1.83 m)	185 lb (84 kg)	Jun 12, 2016
Jace James; WR	Recruit ratings: Scout: Rivals: 247Sports: ESPN:				
Charlie Kuhbander; K	Springboro, Ohio	Springboro HS	5 ft 11 in (1.80 m)	185 lb (84 kg)	Jun 13, 2016
Charlie Kuhbander; K	Recruit ratings: Scout: Rivals: 247Sports: ESPN:				
Ethan Wiederkehr; OT	Shoreham, New York	Shoreham-Wading River HS	6 ft 6 in (1.98 m)	285 lb (129 kg)	Jun 13, 2016
Ethan Wiederkehr; OT	Recruit ratings: Scout: Rivals: 247Sports: ESPN:				
Berkeley Holman; WR	Bellflower, California	St. John Bosco HS	6 ft 0 in (1.83 m)	175 lb (79 kg)	Jun 18, 2016
Berkeley Holman; WR	Recruit ratings: Scout: Rivals: 247Sports: ESPN:				
Kyric McGowan; RB	Dalton, Georgia	Dalton HS	5 ft 10 in (1.78 m)	183 lb (83 kg)	Jul 27, 2016
Kyric McGowan; RB	Recruit ratings: Scout: Rivals: 247Sports: ESPN:				
Blake Gallagher; LB	Needham, Massachusetts	Saint Sebastian's School	6 ft 0 in (1.83 m)	220 lb (100 kg)	Dec 14, 2016
Blake Gallagher; LB	Recruit ratings: Scout: Rivals: 247Sports: ESPN:				
Chee Anyanwu; S	Buford, Georgia	Buford HS	6 ft 2 in (1.88 m)	190 lb (86 kg)	Jan 21, 2017
Chee Anyanwu; S	Recruit ratings: Scout: Rivals: 247Sports: ESPN:				
Overall recruit ranking:
Note: In many cases, Scout, Rivals, 247Sports, On3, and ESPN may conflict in their listings of height and weight.; In these cases, the average was taken. ESPN grades are on a 100-point scale.; Sources: "Northwestern Football Commitments". Rivals.; "2017 Northwestern Football Commits". Scout.; "ESPN". ESPN.; "Scout.com Team Recruiting Rankings". Scout.; "2017 Team Ranking". Rivals.com.

== Schedule ==
Northwestern announced its 2017 football schedule on July 11, 2013. The 2017 schedule consisted of 7 home and 5 away games in the regular season. The Wildcats hosted Big Ten foes Iowa, Michigan State, Minnesota, Penn State, and Purdue, and traveled to Illinois, Maryland, Nebraska, Wisconsin.

The Wildcats hosted two of the three non-conference opponents, Bowling Green from the Mid-American Conference and Nevada from the Mountain West Conference, and traveled to Duke from the Atlantic Coast Conference.

Date	Time	Opponent	Rank	Site	TV	Result	Attendance
September 2	2:30 p.m.	Nevada*		Ryan Field; Evanston, IL	BTN	W 31–20	33,018
September 9	11:00 a.m.	at Duke*		Wallace Wade Stadium; Durham, NC	ESPNU	L 17–41	20,241
September 16	6:30 p.m.	Bowling Green*		Ryan Field; Evanston, IL	BTN	W 49–7	33,706
September 30	11:00 a.m.	at No. 10 Wisconsin		Camp Randall Stadium; Madison, WI	ABC	L 24–33	80,584
October 7	11:00 a.m.	No. 4 Penn State^{†}		Ryan Field; Evanston, IL	ABC	L 7–31	41,061
October 14	2:30 p.m.	at Maryland		Maryland Stadium; College Park, MD	ESPN2	W 37–21	38,325
October 21	11:00 a.m.	Iowa		Ryan Field; Evanston, IL	ESPN2	W 17–10 ^{OT}	40,036
October 28	2:30 p.m.	No. 16 Michigan State		Ryan Field; Evanston, IL	ESPN	W 39–31 ^{3OT}	39,369
November 4	2:30 p.m.	at Nebraska		Memorial Stadium; Lincoln, NE	BTN	W 31–24 ^{OT}	89,721
November 11	6:00 p.m.	Purdue	No. 25	Ryan Field; Evanston, IL	ESPN2	W 23–13	33,765
November 18	11:00 a.m.	Minnesota	No. 23	Ryan Field; Evanston, IL	BTN	W 39–0	30,014
November 25	3:00 p.m.	at Illinois	No. 22	Memorial Stadium; Champaign, IL (rivalry)	FS1	W 42–7	30,456
December 29	4:30 p.m.	vs. Kentucky	No. 21	Nissan Stadium; Nashville, TN (Music City Bowl)	ESPN	W 24–23	48,675
*Non-conference game; ^{†}Homecoming; Rankings from AP Poll and CFP Rankings after October 31 released prior to game; All times are in Central time

Schedule source:

== Rankings ==
Ranking movements Legend: ██ Increase in ranking ██ Decrease in ranking — = Not ranked RV = Received votes
	Week															
Poll	Pre	1	2	3	4	5	6	7	8	9	10	11	12	13	14	Final
AP	RV	RV	—	—	—	—	—	—	—	—	RV	RV	23	20	20	17
Coaches	RV	RV	—	—	—	—	—	—	—	—	RV	RV	23	20	20	17
CFP	Not released									—	25	23	22	21	21	Not released

== Roster ==
2017 Northwestern Wildcats football team roster
Players
Coaches
Offense

Pos.	#	Name	Class
WR	2	Flynn Nagel	Jr
WR	4	Solomon Vault	Sr
WR	5	Charles Fessler	So
WR	6	Jelani Roberts	Jr
QB	7	Matt Alviti	Sr
RB	8	Auston Anderson	Jr
SB	9	Garrett Dickerson	Sr
QB	10	T.J. Green	So
QB	11	Aidan Smith	Fr
QB	13	Andrew Marty	Fr
QB	14	Lloyd Yates	So
WR	15	Macan Wilson	Sr
WR	16	Kyric McGowan	Fr
WR	17	Jalen Brown	Jr
QB	18	Clayton Thorson (C)	Jr
WR	19	Riley Lees	Fr
RB	20	John Moten IV	So
RB	21	Justin Jackson (C)	Sr
WR	23	Steven Reese	So
RB	25	Corey Acker	Sr
RB	26	Chad Hanaoka	Sr
RB	28	Jeremy Larkin	Fr
RB	36	Jesse Brown	So
SB	44	James Prather	Jr
SB	46	Eric Lutzen	Jr
OL	50	Samuel Gerak	Fr
OL	57	Cam Kolwich	Fr
OL	59	J. B. Butler	Jr
OL	61	Jason Goosen	Fr
OL	64	Andrew Otterman	So
OL	65	Jared Thomas	So
OL	66	Nik Urban	Fr
OL	68	Connor Mahoney	Sr
OL	69	Brad North	Sr
OL	70	Rashawn Slater	Fr
OL	71	Tommy Doles	Jr
OL	72	Blake Hance	Jr
OL	73	Gunnar Vogel	Fr
OL	74	Graham Bullmore	Sr
OL	75	Ben Oxley	Jr
OL	76	Ethan Wiederkehr	Fr
OL	77	Jesse Meyler	Fr
OL	78	Adam Lemke-Bell	So
OL	79	Trey Klock	Jr
SB	80	Trey Pugh	Fr
WR	81	Ramaud Chiaokhiao-Bowman	Fr
SB	82	Alex Oelsner	Fr
WR	83	Will Lansbury	Fr
SB	83	Heath Reineke	Jr
WR	84	Cameron Green	So
WR	85	Jack Tirmonia	Fr
SB	86	Cody Link	Fr
SB	87	Eric Eshoo	Fr
WR	88	Ben Skowronek	So
WR	89	Berkeley Holman	Fr

Defense

Pos.	#	Name	Class
CB	3	Keith Watkins II	Jr
DB	7	Marcus McShepard	Sr
LB	10	Brett Walsh	Jr
DB	11	Parrker Westphal	Jr
DB	12	Alonzo Mayo	So
LB	13	Warren Long	Sr
S	16	Godwin Igwebuike (C)	Sr
DB	18	Cameron Ruiz	Fr
S	21	Kyle Queiro	Sr
DB	22	Bryce Jackson	Fr
DB	23	Donovan Sermons	Fr
CB	24	Montre Hartage	Jr
DB	25	Austin Hiller	Fr
DB	26	Brian Bullock	Fr
DB	27	Roderick Campbell	So
DB	28	J. R. Pace	Fr
DB	29	Trae Williams	So
LB	32	Nate Hall	Jr
DB	33	Travis Whillock	Fr
LB	34	Chee Anyanwu	Fr
LB	35	Erik Mueller	Fr
DB	37	Moe Almasri	Sr
LB	40	Peter McIntyre	Fr
S	41	Jared McGee	Jr
LB	42	Paddy Fisher	Fr
LB	45	Nathan Fox	So
LB	46	Troy Hudetz	Fr
DB	47	Joe Bergin	So
LB	49	Chris Bergin	Fr
LB	50	Jango Glackin	Fr
LB	51	Blake Gallagher	Fr
DL	54	Trent Goens	So
DE	55	Mark Gooden	Fr
DE	56	Xavier Washington	Sr
DL	1	Tyler Lancaster (C)	Sr
DE	87	Trevor Kent	Fr
DT	90	Jake Saunders	Fr
DL	91	Samdup Miller	Fr
DL	92	Fred Wyatt	Jr
DL	93	Joe Spivak	Fr
DE	94	Tommy Carnifax	Fr
DL	95	Alex Miller	So
DL	97	Joe Gaziano	So
DE	98	Earnest Brown IV	Fr
DL	99	Jordan Thompson	Jr

Special teams

Pos.	#	Name	Class
K, P	14	Charlie Kuhbander	Fr
H, P	17	Daniel Kubiuk	Jr
K, P	31	Luke Otto	Sr
P	37	Cody Gronewold	Fr
K, P	38	Drew Luckenbaugh	Fr
PK	39	Mason Weissenhofer	So
LS	43	Tyler Gillikin	Fr
LS	48	Peter Snodgrass	Fr
LS	58	Trevor Stroebel	Sr
P	96	Hunter Niswander	Sr

Head coach

- Pat Fitzgerald

Coordinators/assistant coaches

- Randy Bates (linebackers)
- Jerry Brown (assistant head coach / defensive backs)
- Adam Cushing (offensive line)
- Mike Hankwitz (defensive coordinator)
- Bob Heffner (superbacks)
- Marty Long (defensive line)
- Matt MacPherson (running backs / recruiting coordinator)
- Mick McCall (offensive coordinator / quarterbacks)
- Dennis Springer (wide receivers)
- Chris Bowers (director of player personnel)
- Cody Cejda (director of football operations)
- Darby Dunnagan (director of video operations)
- Jay Hooten (director of sports performance for football)
- Jacob Schmidt (director of player development)
- Tim Brandon (offensive graduate assistant)
- Erik Frazier (offensive graduate assistant)
- Deonte Gibson (defensive graduate assistant)
- Kevin Koch (defensive graduate assistant)
- Mike Jasinski (recruiting assistant)
- Bryan Payton (recruiting assistant)
- Christian Sarkisian (recruiting assistant)

Legend

- (C) Team captain
- (S) Suspended
- (I) Ineligible
- Injured
- Redshirt

Roster
Last update: August 18, 2017

== Players in the 2018 NFL draft ==
Player	Position	Round	Pick	NFL club
Justin Jackson	RB	7	251	Los Angeles Chargers
