= Pat Fitzgerald =

American football player and coach (born 1974)

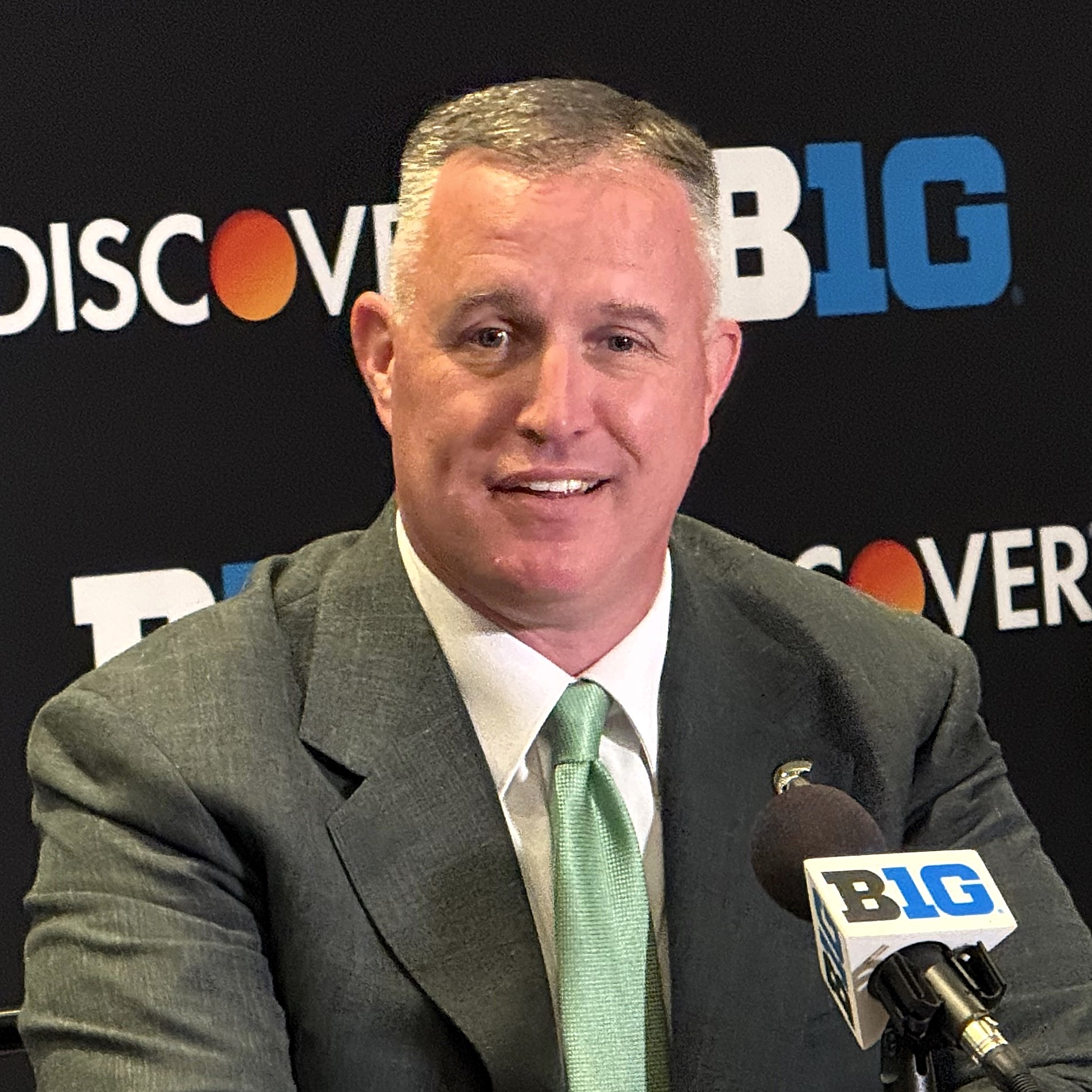
- Fitzgerald at 2026 Big Ten Media Day

Current position
- Title: Head coach
- Team: Michigan State
- Conference: Big Ten
- Record: 3–8

Biographical details
- Born: December 2, 1974 (age 51); Midlothian, Illinois, U.S.

Playing career
- 1993–1996: Northwestern
- Position: Linebacker

Coaching career (HC unless noted)
- 1998: Maryland (GA)
- 1999: Colorado (GA)
- 2000: Idaho (LB/S)
- 2001: Northwestern (DB)
- 2002–2003: Northwestern (LB)
- 2004–2005: Northwestern (LB/RC)
- 2006–2022: Northwestern
- 2023–2025: Loyola Academy (IL) (volunteer assistant)
- 2026–present: Michigan State

Head coaching record
- Overall: 113–109
- Bowls: 5–5

Accomplishments and honors

Championships
- 2x Big Ten West Division (2018, 2020)

Awards
- As a coach: Hayes–Schembechler Coach of the Year (2018); Bobby Dodd Coach of the Year Award (2020); As a player: 2× Bronko Nagurski Trophy (1995, 1996); 2× Chuck Bednarik Award (1995, 1996); Jack Lambert Trophy (1996); 2× Consensus All-American (1995, 1996); 2× Big Ten Defensive Player of the Year (1995, 1996) (Note: Co-winner this season with Shawn Springs); 2× First-team All-Big Ten (1995, 1996); Big Ten Medal of Honor (1997); Northwestern Athletic Hall of Fame (2003)
- College Football Hall of Fame; Inducted in 2008 (profile)

Patrick William Fitzgerald Jr. (born December 2, 1974) is an American football coach and former player who serves as the head football coach at Michigan State University. He previously served as the head coach at Northwestern University from 2006 until 2023.

Fitzgerald was promoted to head coach at Northwestern following the sudden death of head coach Randy Walker prior to the 2006 season. He was 31 at the time, making him the youngest head football coach in the Big Ten Conference and NCAA Division I FBS. Fitzgerald became the longest-tenured head coach in Northwestern football history. He played as a linebacker for Northwestern from 1993 to 1996, winning both the Bronko Nagurski Trophy and Chuck Bednarik Award twice as the best defensive player in college football. He was awarded a Big Ten Medal of Honor in 1997 and was inducted into the College Football Hall of Fame in 2008.

== Playing career ==
Fitzgerald starred at linebacker for the Wildcats in the mid-1990s, helping to lead the team to a 10–1 regular season record in 1995 and a berth in the 1996 Rose Bowl, the school's second bowl appearance and the first since 1949. He recorded eleven tackles in Northwestern's victory over #9 Notre Dame in South Bend, the Wildcats' first victory over the Irish since 1962. Against #7 Michigan, Fitzgerald led the defensive effort with 14 tackles, including two tackles for losses, in the Wildcats' 19–13 win, the first for Northwestern against Michigan since 1959. At one point during the 1995 season he averaged over 13 tackles a game on his way to Consensus All-America honors. Fitzgerald was unable to play in the Rose Bowl after breaking his leg in the next-to-last game of the 1995 season against Iowa. Fitzgerald returned for the 1996 season, leading the Wildcats to a 9–3 overall record, a second straight Big Ten Championship, and a second consecutive New Year's Day bowl, the 1997 Citrus Bowl.

In his playing career, he was twice named Big Ten Defensive Player of the Year and was a two-time Consensus All-American. Fitzgerald won both the Bronko Nagurski Trophy and the Chuck Bednarik Award in 1995 and again in 1996, becoming the first two-time winner of both honors. He also won the Jack Lambert Trophy as best linebacker in the nation in 1996. In 1997, he was awarded the Big Ten Medal of Honor, which recognizes one male and one female student from the graduating class of each Big Ten member school, for athletic and academic excellence.

He was not selected in the 1997 NFL draft but he was signed as a free agent by the Dallas Cowboys. They released him after two pre-season games.

Fitzgerald is the fifteenth Northwestern player or coach to be inducted into the College Football Hall of Fame. He was honored at a ceremony on December 9, 2008, in New York City and enshrined in the Hall of Fame in South Bend, Indiana in July 2009.

== Coaching career ==
=== Early career ===
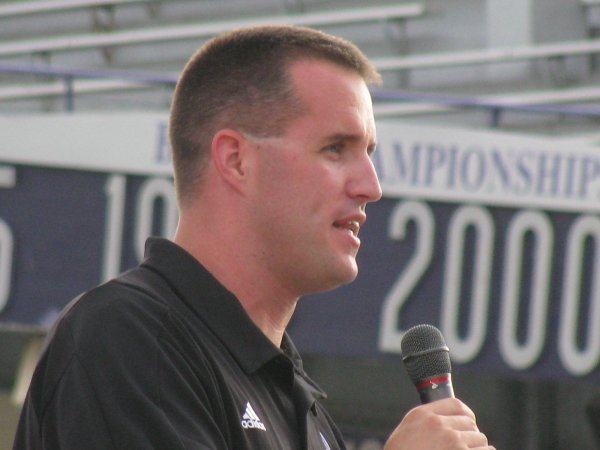
Fitzgerald at "Meet the Team" night, August 22, 2008

After graduation, Fitzgerald joined the coaching staff at the University of Maryland in 1998 under head coach Ron Vanderlinden. He then moved on to the University of Colorado under his former Northwestern head coach, Gary Barnett. He took a job at the University of Idaho before returning to Northwestern in 2001, where he served as linebackers coach and recruiting coordinator until his promotion to head coach after the unexpected death of Randy Walker in June 2006.

=== Northwestern ===
==== 2006–2022 ====
The Wildcats struggled in Fitzgerald's first season as head coach going only 4–8 overall and 2–6 in the Big Ten.

The Wildcats improved to 6–6 the following year before going 9–3 in the 2008 regular season (5–3 in conference play) and playing in the Alamo Bowl. After the season, Fitzgerald was named the Big Ten Coach of the Year by the Touchdown Club of Columbus.

The 2009 season saw the Wildcats beat Iowa 17–10 on November 7. The win over fourth-ranked Iowa is, to date, the highest ranked opponent defeated by a Fitzgerald coached team. Two weeks later, the Wildcats beat #14 Wisconsin for the second upset win of the season. Northwestern finished off the '09 season at the 2010 Outback Bowl, where their quarterback, Mike Kafka, set school records all-time all-bowl records with 47 completions on 78 attempts for 532 passing yards. The Wildcats lost 38–35 in overtime to Auburn, who would win the BCS Championship the following season, when a fake field goal attempt fell short.

In 2011, the Wildcats defeated #9 Nebraska in Lincoln 28–27 with backup quarterback Kain Colter guiding the team in the second half.

In 2012, Fitzgerald became the second coach in school history to coach two nine-win teams. Northwestern played in the third New Year's Day bowl game under Fitzgerald, the 2013 Gator Bowl. They won 34–20, their first bowl victory in sixty-four years, over Mississippi State in the Gator Bowl. The '12 team finished the season with a 10–3 record which tied the 1995 and 1903 teams for the most wins in school history. The Gator Bowl win was also Fitzgerald's 50th win as head coach, allowing him to pass Pappy Waldorf as the winningest coach in Northwestern history.

==== 2013 ====
Despite going 10–3 and reaching the Gator Bowl the year before, the 2013 Northwestern team finished just 5–7 and missed a bowl game. The season began with a 4-game winning streak before the team went on a 7-game losing skid. College GameDay was on-site for the October 5 matchup against No. 4 Ohio State. The Wildcats finished on a high note with a road win over Illinois.

==== 2014 ====
In 2014, the team started 0–2 with a loss to Northern Illinois before winning three straight. After back-to-back blowout losses to #19 Nebraska and Iowa, Northwestern lost to Michigan at home. In their next game, they beat Notre Dame 43–40. After a win against Purdue they played Illinois for a chance to return to a bowl game. However, having lost Siemian to a season-ending injury during the Purdue game, the Wildcats lost 47–33.

==== 2015 ====
After back-to-back losing seasons for the first time in his Northwestern tenure, Fitzgerald faced an uncertain season in 2015. The team had to replace Siemian and turned to redshirt freshman Clayton Thorson. Jackson was named the starting running back prior to the season. In the season opener, the Wildcats beat #21 Stanford 16–6. The Wildcats went on a five-game winning streak rising to #13 in the nation before losing 38–0 to Michigan in Ann Arbor. The Wildcats finished their season with a 45-6 loss to Tennessee in the Outback Bowl.

==== 2016 ====
In 2016, the Wildcats finished 7–6.

==== 2017 ====
In 2017, Fitzgerald's Wildcats went 10–3. 2 of the 3 losses were against top-15 teams, Wisconsin and Ohio State. The season included multiple overtime wins, including a 3-overtime victory against No. 16 Michigan State. Despite the solid season, the team finished second in the West Division behind Wisconsin. However, Northwestern went on to earn a 24–23 win in the Music City Bowl against Kentucky.

==== 2018 ====
The Wildcats finished 9–5 in 2017. In the 2018 Holiday Bowl, they defeated the Utah Utes 31–20.

==== 2023 ====
On July 7, 2023, Fitzgerald was suspended for two weeks by university president Michael H. Schill after an independent investigation conducted by law firm ArentFox Schiff confirmed allegations made by a player in November 2022 that hazing, including assaults by varsity players, occurred while Fitzgerald was aware and made hand gestures that indicated that freshman players should be physically and sexually assaulted for poor performance. The sexual assaults included acts such as being dry-humped by groups of upperclassmen, being forced to enter team showers through parallel lines of spinning naked teammates to resemble a carwash, and being compelled to perform a center-to-quarterback snapping of a football while naked. The accuser said that he believed that "Everyone would just be looking at each other and be like 'bro, Fitz knows about this,' because you wouldn't take that action otherwise". Investigator Maggie Hickey, who was formerly an Illinois inspector general, stated that the Wildcat players accusations were "largely supported by evidence." On July 10, 2023, Fitzgerald was fired amid the allegations.

==== Legacy ====
Fitzgerald's 110 overall wins and 64 Big Ten Conference wins are both school records. In thirteen seasons, Fitzgerald has coached nine winning teams and one team that finished the season at .500. Coach Fitzgerald has led the Wildcats to ten bowl games in thirteen seasons; before he became head coach the team had only been in six bowl games in 123 football seasons. From 2016 to 2018, Coach Fitzgerald has led the Wildcats to three consecutive bowl wins (2016 Pinstripe, 2017 Music City, 2018 Holiday). From 2008 to 2012, he led the Wildcats to five consecutive bowl appearances, including three of their six all-time New Year's Day bowl appearances. He is one of only two coaches in school history to lead Northwestern to a bowl game victory, is the only NU coach to win back-to-back bowl games and has the most bowl game victories in school history. Fitzgerald is only the second head coach to lead Northwestern to four consecutive winning seasons (2015–2018) and the first since Dick Hanley coached the Wildcats to winning years from 1928 to 1931. Fitzgerald's .567 winning percentage at NU is the highest since Dick Hanley who coached the Wildcats from 1927 to 1934. The 2014–2017 Wildcats seasons are the best – in terms of wins – since the Wildcats teams of 1903–1905.

=== Michigan State ===
On December 1, 2025, Michigan State hired Fitzgerald as its head football coach.

== Personal life ==
Fitzgerald is from Orland Park, Illinois, and resides in Northfield, Illinois with his wife, Stacy, and three sons, Jack, Ryan, and Brendan. He purchased a $2.3 million newly constructed home in January 2010. Fitzgerald is a huge fan of the area pro sports teams often using his Twitter feed to support the Bears, Blackhawks and White Sox. While Fitzgerald has led the Wrigley Field crowd in the iconic "Take Me Out to the Ballgame" song during the seventh inning stretch of a Cubs game, as a South Sider he is a die-hard White Sox fan. In April 2017, Fitzgerald signed a ten-year contract extension with Northwestern. While Northwestern is a private university and is not obligated to release compensation data, some publicly available tax forms indicate that Fitzgerald was among the highest paid coaches in the Big Ten. In further support of Fitzgerald and the football team, Northwestern has built a $260 million football facility on the lakeshore section of campus that opened in 2018. Following his dismissal from Northwestern, Fitzgerald became a parent volunteer for Loyola Academy's football team. Fitzgerald's son, Ryan, was the team's starting quarterback for the 2023 season. Loyola Academy beat Lincoln-Way East High School to win the 2023 IHSA Class 8A State Football Championship.

== Head coaching record ==
Year	Team	Overall	Conference	Standing	Bowl/playoffs	Coaches^{#}	AP^{°}
Northwestern Wildcats (Big Ten Conference) (2006–2022)
2006	Northwestern	4–8	2–6	T–8th			
2007	Northwestern	6–6	3–5	T–7th			
2008	Northwestern	9–4	5–3	T–4th	L Alamo		
2009	Northwestern	8–5	5–3	T–4th	L Outback		
2010	Northwestern	7–6	3–5	T–7th	L TicketCity		
2011	Northwestern	6–7	3–5	5th (Legends)	L Meineke Car Care		
2012	Northwestern	10–3	5–3	3rd (Legends)	W Gator	16	17
2013	Northwestern	5–7	1–7	6th (Legends)			
2014	Northwestern	5–7	3–5	6th (West)			
2015	Northwestern	10–3	6–2	T–2nd (West)	L Outback	22	23
2016	Northwestern	7–6	5–4	T–4th (West)	W Pinstripe		
2017	Northwestern	10–3	7–2	2nd (West)	W Music City	17	17
2018	Northwestern	9–5	8–1	1st (West)	W Holiday	19	21
2019	Northwestern	3–9	1–8	7th (West)			
2020	Northwestern	7–2	6–1	1st (West)	W Citrus	10	10
2021	Northwestern	3–9	1–8	T-6th (West)			
2022	Northwestern	1–11	1–8	7th (West)			
Northwestern:		110–101	65–76				
Michigan State Spartans (Big Ten Conference) (2026–present)
2026	Michigan State	3–8	1–7				
Michigan State:		3–8	1–7				
Total:		113–109					
National championship Conference title Conference division title or championship game berth
^{#}Rankings from final Coaches Poll.; ^{°}Rankings from final AP Poll.
