= Woodland High School (Stockbridge, Georgia) =

Public high school in Stockbridge, Georgia, United States

Location
- 800 N. Moseley Drive; Stockbridge, Georgia 30281; United States
- 33°33′44″N 84°09′11″W

Information
- Type: Public
- Established: 2007
- School district: Henry County Schools
- NCES School ID: 130282003418
- Principal: Purvis R. Jackson
- Faculty: 70.40 (on FTE basis)
- Grades: 9 to 12
- Enrollment: 1,334 (2022–23)
- Student to teacher ratio: 18.95
- Colors: Red, white and black
- Mascot: Wolfy the Wolf
- Nickname: Wolfpack
- Website: Woodland High School

Woodland High School is a public high school located at 800 N. Moseley Drive in Stockbridge, Georgia, United States. The school's teams are known as the Wolfpack.

== Notable alumni ==
- Shakur Brown (class of 2017), NFL athlete
- Yusuf Corker (class of 2017), NFL athlete
