= Yusuf Corker =

American football player (born 1998)

Profile
- Position: Safety

Personal information
- Born: December 26, 1998 (age 27); Stockbridge, Georgia, U.S.
- Listed height: 6 ft 0 in (1.83 m)
- Listed weight: 197 lb (89 kg)

Career information
- High school: Woodland (Stockbridge)
- College: Kentucky (2017–2021)
- NFL draft: 2022: undrafted

Career history
- New York Giants (2022)*; Cincinnati Bengals (2022–2023)*
- * Offseason or practice squad member only
- Stats at Pro Football Reference

Yusuf Corker (born December 26, 1998) is an American football safety. He played college football at Kentucky.

== College career ==
Corker redshirted his true freshman season at Kentucky. He played in all 13 of the team's games as a reserve defensive back and on special teams as a redshirt freshman. Corker became a starter going into his redshirt sophomore season and led the team with 74 tackles. He was named second-team All-Southeastern Conference (SEC) as a redshirt junior. Corker recorded 81 tackles, 3.5 tackles for loss, and one sack with eight passes broken up as a senior.

== Professional career ==
Pre-draft measurables
Height	Weight	Arm length	Hand span	Wingspan	40-yard dash	10-yard split	20-yard split	20-yard shuttle	Three-cone drill	Vertical jump	Broad jump	Bench press
6 ft 0 in (1.83 m)	203 lb (92 kg)	31 in (0.79 m)	9 in (0.23 m)	6 ft 2 7/8 in (1.90 m)	4.55 s	1.62 s	2.67 s	4.30 s	7.06 s	34.5 in (0.88 m)	10 ft 1 in (3.07 m)	23 reps
All values from NFL Combine/Pro Day

=== New York Giants ===
Corker was signed by the New York Giants as an undrafted free agent on April 30, 2022, shortly after the conclusion of the 2022 NFL draft. He was waived on August 29.

=== Cincinnati Bengals ===
On September 1, 2022, the Cincinnati Bengals signed Corker to their practice squad. He signed a reserve/future contract on January 31, 2023. Corker was waived on August 29, 2023.
