= Justin Jackson (American football) =

American football player (born 1996)

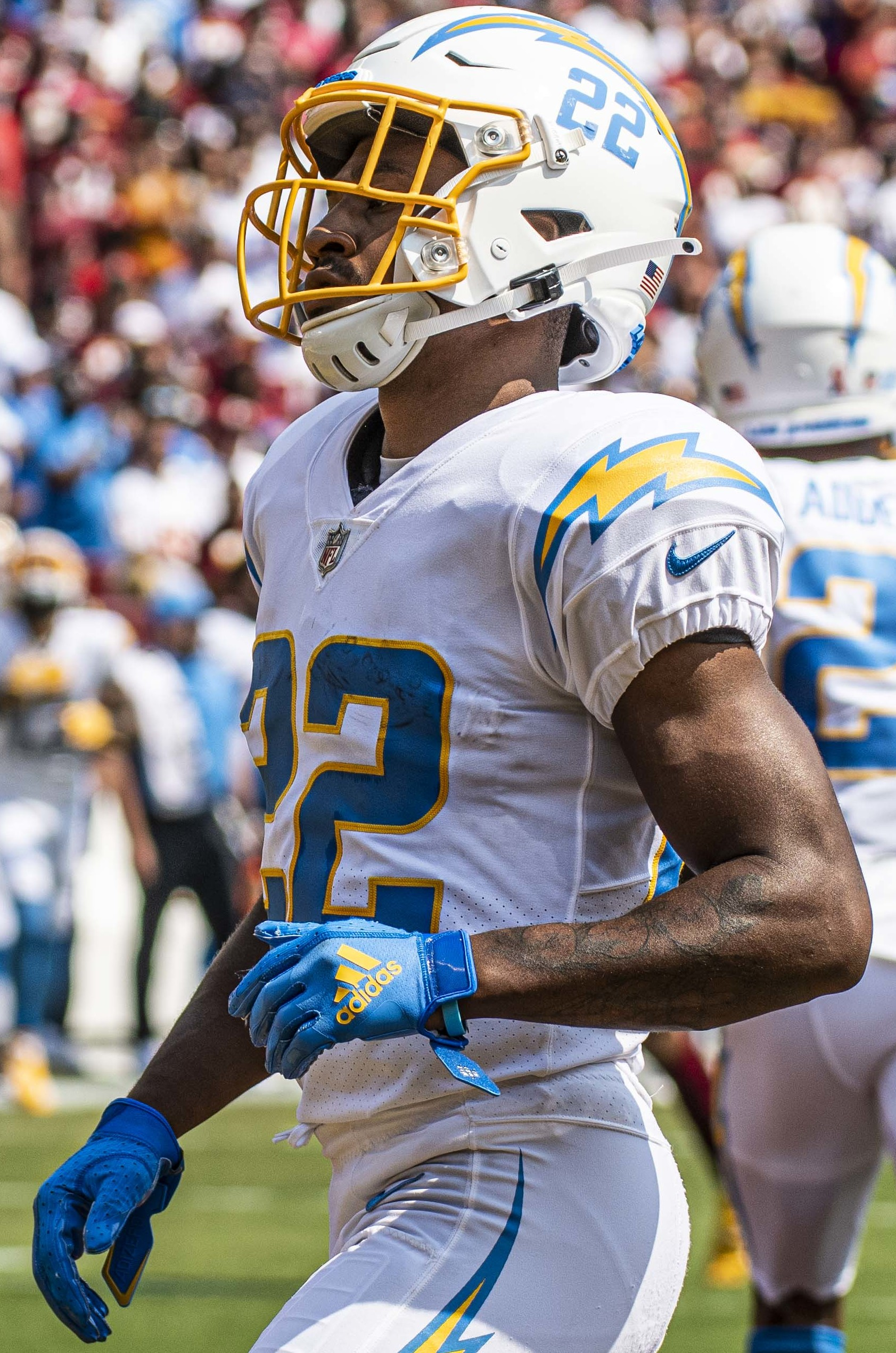
- Jackson with the Los Angeles Chargers in 2021

No. 32, 22, 42, 38
- Position: Running back

Personal information
- Born: April 22, 1996 (age 30); Chicago, Illinois, U.S.
- Listed height: 6 ft 0 in (1.83 m)
- Listed weight: 200 lb (91 kg)

Career information
- High school: Glenbard North (Carol Stream, Illinois)
- College: Northwestern (2014–2017)
- NFL draft: 2018: 7th round, 251st overall pick

Career history
- Los Angeles Chargers (2018–2021); Detroit Lions (2022)

Awards and highlights
- First-team All-Big Ten (2016); 2× Second-team All-Big Ten (2015, 2017)

Career NFL statistics
- Rushing yards: 1,210
- Rushing average: 4.9
- Rushing touchdowns: 5
- Receptions: 77
- Receiving yards: 609
- Receiving touchdowns: 1
- Stats at Pro Football Reference

Justin Joseph Jackson (born April 22, 1996) is an American former professional football player who was a running back in the National Football League (NFL). He played college football for the Northwestern Wildcats.

== Early life ==
Jackson was born to Phil Jackson Sr. and the late Denise Jackson in Carol Stream, Illinois on April 22, 1996. Jackson was the youngest of three siblings. However, when Jackson was three years old, his mother, Denise, died from breast cancer. Jackson's father did remarry, and his stepmother is Veronica Jackson.

Jackson started playing football in second grade with the Carol Stream Youth Football Association Panthers because of Phil Jackson Jr., Justin's older brother, who began at the same time but in fourth grade. Phil Jackson Jr. ended up going to Northwest Missouri State, winning three Division II national championships. According to his father, Jackson dominated on the field in his youth.

Jackson attended Glenbard North High School, where he played high school football alongside his brother during sophomore year. Jackson did well in school, and in sports. He was a three-sport high school athlete with a nearly 5.0 grade point average. Jackson played football, basketball, and track in high school. Jackson holds the Glenbard North record for career rushing yards and ranks sixth all-time in IHSA history for career rushing yards (6,531 yards) and seventh all-time in rushing touchdowns with 85. As a junior in 2012, Jackson competed in the state finals against Mount Carmel high school. In that game he returned an interception over 79 yards for a touchdown; but was held to 65 yards rushing on 26 carries. Mount Carmel won the game 28–14. As a senior in 2013, Jackson recorded 42 carries for 405 yards and five touchdowns in a 40–34 win over eventual 8A state champion No. 15 Naperville Central. He finished the 2013 season with 3,171 rushing yards in 11 games, the second most in a single season in IHSA history; the 3-seeded Panthers were upset in the second round of the playoffs by 6-seed and eventual 8A semifinalist Stevenson High School (Lincolnshire, Illinois), otherwise Jackson would have had up to three more games to rush for 155 yards for the Illinois single-season record. Jackson was also a member of the Honor Roll and French Honors Society. He was ranked No. 5 overall prospect out of Illinois by Scout.com and the No. 4 all-purpose running back in the nation by 247Sports.com. He was the winner of the Gatorade High School Football Player of the Year award for the state of Illinois for the 2012–13 and 2013–14 seasons.

== College career ==
After being one of the most successful high school running backs in Illinois history, Jackson joined the Northwestern Wildcats football team in 2014. Jackson has also set many records in his collegiate career. In his freshman year, he started five of 12 games which he led the Wildcats in rushing each week, finishing with 1,187 yards and 10 touchdowns on 245 carries (22 catches, 201 yards, one touchdown receiving). Jackson was a second-team All-Big Ten Conference pick in 2015, racking up 1,418 yards and five scores on 312 carries (ranked third in the Football Bowl Subdivision), along with 21 catches and 162 yards as a receiver. In 2016, Jackson still carried the ball 226 times for 1,300 yards and 12 scores – and caught 33 passes for 210 yards – in an all-conference junior season by coaches. He finished off the year with a 224-yard, three-touchdown effort against the Pitt Panthers in the 2016 Pinstripe Bowl where he showed off his quickness, vision, and efficient running style. Jackson became the leading rusher in Northwestern history and became the ninth player in NCAA history to have four years with 1,000 yards. He was a second-team All-Big Ten selection with 287 carries for 1,311 yards and 11 touchdowns rushing along with 44 catches for 276 receiving yards.

== Professional career ==
Pre-draft measurables
Height	Weight	Arm length	Hand span	40-yard dash	10-yard split	20-yard split	20-yard shuttle	Three-cone drill	Vertical jump	Broad jump	Bench press
5 ft 11 5/8 in (1.82 m)	199 lb (90 kg)	30 5/8 in (0.78 m)	9 1/4 in (0.23 m)	4.52 s	1.57 s	2.62 s	4.07 s	6.81 s	38.5 in (0.98 m)	10 ft 2 in (3.10 m)	13 reps
All values from NFL Combine

=== Los Angeles Chargers ===
Jackson was selected by the Los Angeles Chargers in the seventh round (251st overall) of the 2018 NFL draft. He was waived on September 3, 2018, and was signed to the practice squad the next day. He was promoted to the active roster on September 24, 2018.

He made his professional debut in Week 4 against the San Francisco 49ers. In a Week 6 game against the Cleveland Browns, he recorded his first three professional carries, which went for four yards. In Week 13, against the Pittsburgh Steelers on NBC Sunday Night Football, he had eight carries for 63 yards and his first professional rushing touchdown. The following week against the Kansas City Chiefs, Jackson made his first career start following injuries to Melvin Gordon and Austin Ekeler, rushing for 58 yards on 16 carries and scoring a touchdown. Overall, he finished the 2018 season with 206 rushing yards and two rushing touchdowns to go along with 15 receptions for 135 receiving yards. He made his postseason debut with two carries for five rushing yards in the 23–17 victory over the Baltimore Ravens in the Wild Card Round. He had three receptions for 22 yards in the 41–28 loss to the New England Patriots in the Divisional Round.

In the 2019 season, Jackson finished with 29 carries for 200 rushing yards in seven games.

Jackson entered the 2020 season as the No. 2 running back to Austin Ekeler. He suffered a knee injury in Week 9 and was placed on injured reserve on November 14, 2020. He was activated on December 12, 2020. In Week 17 against the Chiefs, Jackson recorded 104 yards from scrimmage during the 38–21 win. Jackson finished the 2020 season with 59 carries for 270 rushing yards to go along with 19 receptions for 173 receiving yards.

In Week 8 of the 2021 season, against the Patriots, Jackson had a career-long 75-yard run. In Week 15, against the Chiefs, Jackson led the Chargers in carries with 13 for 86 yards rushing and a 13-yard reception, totaling 99 yards from scrimmage. In Week 16, against the Texans, he recorded a career-high 162 scrimmage yards and 8 receptions to go along with his only two rushing touchdowns of the season in the 41-29 loss. In the 2021 season overall, Jackson finished with 68 carries for 364 rushing to go along with 22 receptions for 178 receiving yards in 14 games, all career-highs.

=== Detroit Lions ===
On August 1, 2022, Jackson signed with the Detroit Lions. He was released on August 30, 2022, and signed to the practice squad the next day. He was promoted to the active roster on September 14. He finished the 2022 season with 42 carries for 170 rushing yards and one rushing touchdown to go along with 12 receptions for 101 receiving yards and one receiving touchdown in 16 games.

On July 22, 2023, Jackson re-signed with the Detroit Lions. On August 10, 2023, he announced his retirement from professional football.

== Career statistics ==
=== NFL ===
==== Regular season ====
Year	Team	Games		Rushing					Receiving					Fumbles	
Year	Team	GP	GS	Att	Yds	Avg	Lng	TD	Rec	Yds	Avg	Lng	TD	Fum	Lost
2018	LAC	13	1	50	206	4.1	20	2	15	135	9.0	19	0	0	0
2019	LAC	7	0	29	200	6.9	40	0	9	22	2.4	9	0	0	0
2020	LAC	9	4	59	270	4.6	36	0	19	173	9.1	34	0	0	0
2021	LAC	14	2	68	364	5.4	75	2	22	178	8.1	25	0	1	1
2022	DET	16	0	42	170	4.0	27	1	12	101	8.4	15	1	0	0
Career		59	7	248	1,210	4.9	75	5	77	609	7.9	34	1	1	1

==== Postseason ====
Year	Team	Games		Rushing					Receiving					Fumbles	
Year	Team	GP	GS	Att	Yds	Avg	Lng	TD	Rec	Yds	Avg	Lng	TD	Fum	Lost
2018	LAC	2	0	3	9	3.0	4	0	3	22	7.3	9	0	0	0
Career		2	0	3	9	3.0	4	0	3	22	7.3	20	0	0	0

=== College ===
College statistics
Year	GP	Rushing					Receiving				
Year	GP	Att	Yds	Avg	Lng	TD	Rec	Yds	Avg	Lng	TD
2014	12	245	1,187	4.8	68	10	22	201	9.1	35	1
2015	13	312	1,418	4.5	62	5	21	162	7.7	28	0
2016	13	298	1,524	5.1	68	15	35	219	6.3	37	0
2017	13	287	1,311	4.6	79	11	44	276	6.3	24	0
Career	51	1,142	5,440	4.8	79	41	121	848	7.0	37	1

== Political views ==
Jackson is an outspoken advocate for left-wing politics. He endorsed Bernie Sanders in his second presidential run in 2020. He is the host of The Takeover with Justin Jackson and has appeared on several left-wing channels including Chapo Trap House, the Jimmy Dore Show, Krystal Ball's segment of Rising on The Hill, and the Michael Brooks Show. On Twitter, Jackson exchanged comments with Center for American Progress President Neera Tanden after he critiqued an email of hers which insinuated that the United States of America should take Libya's oil to help mitigate the U.S. deficit. Jackson has also criticized Representative Alexandria Ocasio-Cortez and many other progressive Democrats in Congress for refusing to withhold their votes for Nancy Pelosi as Speaker of the House of Representatives until Pelosi agreed to bring Medicare for All to a floor vote. In February 2021, Jackson started The Takeover with Justin Jackson, a progressive commentary show on YouTube. Jackson is good friends with fellow activist and commentator Kyle Kulinski who in Jackson's own words has influenced him, and has assisted in his political journey.
