= Yancey =

Yancey may refer to:

== People ==
=== Given name ===
- Yancey Arias (born 1971), American actor
- Yancey McGill (born 1952), American politician from South Carolina
- Yancey Strickler (born 1978), American businessman and co-founder of Kickstarter
- Yancey Thigpen (born 1969), American professional football player
- Yancey Williams (1916–1953), American military officer and pilot

=== Surname ===
- Asa G. Yancey Sr. (1916–2013), American physician and medical school professor
- Bartlett Yancey (1785–1828), American politician from North Carolina
- Benjamin Cudworth Yancey Jr. (1817–1891), American politician and diplomat, Confederate military officer
- Bert Yancey (1938–1994), American professional golfer
- Bessie Woodson Yancey (1882–1958), American poet, teacher, and activist
- Charles Yancey (born 1948), American politician from Massachusetts
- David Yancey (born 1972), American politician from Virginia
- DeAngelo Yancey (born 1994), American professional football player
- Estelle Yancey (1896–1986), American blues singer
- George Yancey (born 1962), American sociologist
- Hendrix Yancey (born 2011), American actress
- Hogan Yancey (1881–1960), American football and baseball player, attorney, and politician from Kentucky
- James Yancey or J Dilla (1974–2006), American rapper and music producer
- Jean Yancey (1914–2000), American women's small business consultant and motivational speaker
- Jimmy Yancey (1895–1951), American pianist
- Joel Yancey (1773–1838), American politician from Kentucky
- John Yancey (disambiguation), multiple people
  - John Yancey (tennis) (born 1970), American professional tennis player
  - John Derek Yancey or Illa J (born 1986), American rapper
  - John F. Yancey (1826–1903), American hotelier and concessionaire
  - John H. Yancey (1918–1986), American soldier
- Kathleen Blake Yancey (born 1950), American English professor
- Kemper Yancey (1887–1957), American college football player and coach
- Lee Yancey (born 1968), American politician from Mississippi
- Lewis Yancey (1895–1940), American aviator
- Lovie Yancey (1912–2008), American businesswoman, founder of Fatburger
- Mary Yancey (1902–1992), American ceramic artist and designer
- Philip Yancey (born 1949), American writer
- Quillian Yancey (1922–2005), American politician from Florida
- Rick Yancey (born 1962), American novelist
- Scott Yancey (born 1969), American TV personality and businessman
- Tenisha Yancey (born 1976), American politician from Michigan
- William L. Yancey (1814–1863), American politician from Alabama
- Worth B. Yancey (1879–1912), American college football player and minor league baseball player

== Places ==
- Richard K. Yancey Wildlife Management Area
- Yancey, Kentucky
- Yancey Collegiate Institute Historic District
- Yancey County, North Carolina
- Yancey Mills, Virginia
- Yanceyville, North Carolina
- Yancey, Texas

== Other ==
- Hotel Yancey (Grand Island, Nebraska), hotel in Grand Island, Nebraska
- USS Yancey (AKA-93), an Andromeda-class attack cargo ship
- Yancey Boys, an album by Illa J
- Yancey Railroad, former railroad line in Yancey County, North Carolina
- Yancey Richardson Gallery, dealer of fine art photography in New York City
- Yancey's Fancy, producer of artisan cheeses
- Yancey's Tavern, historic structure in Sullivan County, Tennessee
