= Yancy =

Yancy may refer to:

Given name:

- Yancy (musician) (born 1980), American Christian musician
- Yancy Ayers (1891–1968), American pitcher in Major League Baseball
- Yancy Butler (born 1970), American television and movie actress
- Yancy de Ocampo (born 1980), Filipino professional basketball player
- Yancy Gates (born 1989), basketball player for Ironi Nahariya of the Israeli Premier League
- Yancy Lindsey (born 1962), United States Navy vice admiral
- Yancy Medeiros, American mixed martial artist from Wai'anae, Hawaii
- Yancy Spencer III (1950–2011), surfer from Pensacola, Florida
- Yancy Thigpen (born 1969), former professional American football wide receiver

Surname:

- Allen Yancy (1881–1941), Vice President of Liberia from 1928 to 1930
- Barbara Yancy (1934–1996), American politician
- Carlos Yancy (born 1970), American football player
- Clyde Yancy (born 1958), American cardiologist
- Dorothy Cowser Yancy (born 1944), American academic
- George Yancy (born 1961), American philosopher
- Hugh Yancy (born 1949), American baseball player
- Jesse L. Yancy Jr. (1926–1970), American politician
- Marvin Yancy (1950–1985), American gospel musician

Fiction:

- "The Mold of Yancy", science fiction short story by Philip K. Dick, first published in 1955
- Yancy Academy, school setting of the first Percy Jackson book, The Lightning Thief, by Rick Riordan
- Yancy Derringer, American Western series that ran on CBS from 1958 to 1959
- Yancy Street Gang, fictional street gang in the Fantastic Four comic book published by Marvel Comics
- Yancy, a character in Pokémon Black 2 and White 2
- Yancy Fry, brother of Philip J. Fry in American animated science fiction sitcom Futurama
- Yancy Tucker, a secondary character on The Waltons

Typhoons:

- Typhoon Yancy (Gading) (1990)
- Typhoon Yancy (Tasing) (1993)

== See also ==
- Yancey (disambiguation)
- Ayancık
- Ancey
- Ancy
