= Battle On Broadway =

American college sports rivalry

- Kentucky Wildcats
- Sport: Football & Basketball

Locations in Lexington

The Battle On Broadway, also known as the Kentucky–Transylvania rivalry, is a rivalry between inter-city and in-state rivals in football and basketball. Both schools in fact were once under the same Kentucky University. The Agricultural & Mechanical College of Kentucky eventually broke off to become its own separate entity in 1878. Almost a hundred years after most of the games were played the Lexington Herald-Leader wrote that the rivalry was "arguably more intense and controversial than any experienced in UK's history.”

== Beginnings of the rivalry ==
The University of Kentucky began as the Agricultural & Mechanical extension of Transylvania University. In 1878, the two schools separated, with Kentucky moving to the south side of Lexington. Shortly afterward, they would start competing in scholarly activities such as oratorical contests which eventually led to athletics competition.

== Name confusion ==
Throughout the majority of the active rivalry, Transylvania was known as Kentucky University, and the University of Kentucky was known as Kentucky State College. The similar names caused confusion with several colleges including the University of Cincinnati and The Ohio State University, still listing games played against Transylvania as games against the University of Kentucky. It also caused some friction between the two schools, in 1908 a section Transylvania University campus gate inscribed with the words "Kentucky University" was clandestinely removed. It was blamed on University of Kentucky students but never proven. When UK wanted to upgrade its name to Kentucky State University, it paid $5,000 for Transylvania to change its name.

== Football ==
In 1880 Transylvania faced Centre in the first intercollegiate game in the state. The next year Transylvania played three games Kentucky with Transylvania winning two of the three. The schools would play regularly after that for the couple decades. By the early part of the 20th century, the football game between the two schools became the "highlight of the college sports season" for the fans of the two schools and the citizens of Lexington. As the game became more popular, "the rivalry became more bitter." To capitalize on the popularity of the rivalry, the game was usually played on Thanksgiving so that the large gate could solve the team's financial problems.

Throughout the early years of the rivalry accusations on both sides concerning the use of professional players. This issue came to a head in 1903. Transylvania claimed that Kentucky's coach, C.W. Wright went to New York to recruit players for the game to replace the current team of student-athletes. Kentucky responded by pointing out that two players, Hogan and Worth Yancey, on Transylvania had played professional baseball the summer before the season. The Lexington Herald covered for the Crimson by stating the Yancey brothers only used the money for college expenses. Tensions were also high because earlier in the season, a riot broke out a scrimmage between the two schools' second teams resulting in that game not being finished. Over 300 students, players, and fans were involved. Some participants wielded clubs and buggy whips resulting in several injuries. With both teams coming into the game with outstanding records, the past issues and accusations did not damper the enthusiasm for the game. The local papers reported, "no other event had generated more interest in the city than the impending contest." With all the excitement the price of admission more than doubled, and extra grandstands were installed around the field to make room for the anticipated crowd. Fans across the state charted special trains for the game. Transylvania easily won 17–0 with UK fans saying they should have used their regular player instead of the ringers from the East coast. Afterward, UK president Patterson had the select committee investigate the accusations of bringing in out of state ringers. The committee confirmed that both the faculty and the athletic association had recruited professionals for the game. After the report came out head coach C.W. Wright was fired. The game resulted in unwanted national attention and was given as an example of the problems in college football. Because of this, Southern Intercollegiate Athletic Association (SIAA) blackballed both schools for several years.

The next year both teams submitted their lineups several days before the game. Both schools indicated that they were satisfied that the team roster submitted did not include any ringers. The Lexington Herald stated it hoped this would "…subdue the growing bitterness of the rivalry." The peace between the two schools did not last long with UK accusing of Transylvania of using ineligible players and threatening to cancel the 1904 Thanksgiving Day game. This outraged A.P. Fairhurst, The chair of the Transylvania athletic committee. Invoking Kentucky's past problems with professional players, he said that Kentucky could "use players from the four corners of the earth and the fifth quarter if you can find it. These issues were brought before an emergency meeting of the Kentucky Intercollegiate Athletic Association (KIAA), which both schools had recently joined because of the issues the year before. Fairhurst stated that KIAA did not have any power over eligibility, and according to its by-laws all decisions of eligibility was by the faculty of each school. During the meeting, Centre College faculty representative A. H. Throckmorton brought up another Transylvania player that just enrolled and was listed on the team for the Kentucky game. Fairhurst responded that the player in question registered late because of the "protracted meetings." The KIAA did not believe the excuse but ruled there was no rule against it. Regardless of the result of the eligibility meeting, Kentucky took several extra measures to get ready for the game including training tables, confining players to campus and not playing any other teams for several weeks before the game. Those actions, along with "superior speed and superb conditioning," resulted in Kentucky easily winning the game.

In 1905, Once again, the game between the two schools was scheduled for Thanksgiving Day. Just like the past seasons, questions of eligibility were bought up again. In addition, Transylvania wanted the game played on its home field. A week before the game, UK canceled the game. Both teams tried to find replacements for Thanksgiving Day with only Transylvania finding an opponent in Ohio Wesylian. The Kentucky team along with a large number of Kentucky fans attended the game. The Lexington Herald feared the "popularity of football would be impaired if the schools did not stop their quibbling. This was not the first time a game between the two schools was canceled at the last minute due to a disagreement. In 1904 a women's basketball game was canceled because of a "disagreement over whether it was proper to wear bloomers in the presence of male officials."

After the season, the KIAA once again took a look at the Transylvania eligibility requirement for athletes. This caused Transylvania to sever ties with the conference. Even the act of leaving was an area of dispute between the two cross-town rivals, with Kentucky saying they were expelled and Transylvania saying it left voluntarily.

In 1906, Due to the missing out of the gate receipts from the Thanksgiving Day game the University of Kentucky athletic board was in financial difficulty. Lexington Herald suggested that the revival of the Thanksgiving Day game against the Cross-town rival was the only way to get back in the black. This plan was dashed when the board of curators of Transylvania University banned all sports for the year. Kentucky was able to schedule Centre College for Thanksgiving Day game. A large crowd showed up for the game that helped Kentucky financially at least for the year.

The next year Transylvania returned to the gridiron; this resulted in the return of the quarreling. The 1907 game was again scheduled for Thanksgiving with hopes of a large gate. A few days before the game, the Kentucky players refused to play because they said Transylvania should give each player two free tickets. Transylvania refused to budge on the issue, and the Kentucky players backed down. The game did not take place on Thanksgiving due to weather and was moved to December 5, resulting in a large loss on money for both schools. Kentucky won the game by the score of 5–0.

After Kentucky blew out the Crimson 77–0 in 1909, the two schools played their final football game in the rivalry in 1911. Transylvania in the fourth quarter came from behind and won by the score of 12–5. After the game, the Transylvania students wearing nightshirts and carrying clubs marched down Main Street and were met by a group of Kentucky supporters. Violence was averted when the University of Kentucky President, Henry Barker, calmed the Wildcats fans. Once again, the two schools disagreed on what had happened with Kentucky student publication blaming the other side. After the near-riot, Transylvania administrators broke off relations on all athletic events.

Kentucky-Transylvania Football Rivalry
- Kentucky Wildcats
- Sport: College Football
- First meeting: November 19, 1881, Transylvania 2–1
- Latest meeting: November 18, 1911, Transylvania 12–5
- Next meeting: N/A, Transylvania Discontinued Football Program

Statistics
- Total meetings: 19
- Most wins: Transylvania: 12

=== Football game results ===
Kentucky victories	Transylvania victories	Tie games

No.	Date	Location	Winner	Score
1	November 12, 1881	Lexington, KY	Kentucky University	2–1
2	November 19, 1881	Lexington, KY	Kentucky State College	7–1
3	December 3, 1881	Lexington, KY	Kentucky University	3–2
4	October 29, 1892	Lexington, KY	Tie	0–0
5	December 10, 1892	Lexington, KY	Kentucky State College	10–4
6	November 4, 1893	Lexington, KY	Kentucky State College	28–0
7	November 25, 1893	Lexington, KY	Kentucky State College	38–28
8	October 24, 1896	Lexington, KY	Kentucky State College	36–6
9	October 2, 1897	Lexington, KY	Kentucky State College	8–6
10	October 1, 1898	Lexington, KY	Kentucky State College	18–0

No.	Date	Location	Winner	Score
11	October 7, 1899	Lexington, KY	Kentucky State College	23–6
12	November 29, 1900	Lexington, KY	Kentucky State College	12–0
13	October 26, 1901	Lexington, KY	Kentucky University	27–0
14	November 27, 1902	Lexington, KY	Kentucky University	6–5
15	November 26, 1903	Lexington, KY	Kentucky University	17–0
16	November 24, 1904	Lexington, KY	Kentucky State College	21–4
17	December 5, 1907	Lexington, KY	Kentucky State College	5–0
18	November 13, 1909	Lexington, KY	Kentucky State College	77–0
19	November 18, 1911	Lexington, KY	Transylvania	12–5
Series: Kentucky leads 12–6–1

== Basketball ==
Being in the same city of Lexington was a major fueling point for the rivalry. Before Transylvania was renamed and the rivalry was renewed, it had led the rivalry 6 games to 5.

For the next three years the rivalry would not be played entirely, until they met three times in the 1911 season. For the first meeting in three years Transylvania would win the first contest at Kentucky 23–18. On February 27, 1905, it was Kentucky who would win at their rivals home 22–19. A final game was played in March of that year, which saw Kentucky win 30–24. This would be the last meeting of the two for one hundred years.

The long dormant rivalry would once again be played in the 2011 season. However over these one hundred years Kentucky had forged its way as one of the most successful programs in college basketball with eight NCAA Division I titles to its name by that time. Because Transylvania was in Division III, these games were exhibitions and did not count towards either schools' season records. Transylvania and Kentucky met again for exhibitions over the next two years, with Kentucky winning both handily.

Kentucky-Transylvania Basketball Rivalry
- Kentucky Wildcats
- Sport: College Basketball
- First meeting: February 20, 1903, Kentucky University: 42 Kentucky A&M: 2
- Latest meeting: October 26, 2018, Kentucky: 94 Transylvania: 66

Statistics
- All-time record: Kentucky, 11–8
- Regular season series: Transylvania, 8–6

=== Basketball game results ===
Transylvania victories	Kentucky victories	Tie games

No.	Date	Location	Winner	Score
1	February 20, 1903	Lexington, KY	Kentucky University	42–2
2	December 2, 1904	Lexington, KY	Kentucky University	12–5
3	February 26, 1904	Lexington, KY	Kentucky University	14–12
4	January 27, 1905	Lexington, KY	Kentucky State College	30–29
5	February 4, 1905	Lexington, KY	Kentucky University	29–1
6	February 22, 1905	Lexington, KY	Kentucky University	33–23
7	January 11, 1906†	Lexington, KY	Kentucky State College	1–0
8	February 2, 1907	Lexington, KY	Kentucky State College	16–14
9	March 7, 1907	Lexington, KY	Kentucky University	29–5
10	January 21, 1908	Lexington, KY	Kentucky State College	20–15
11	February 4, 1908	Lexington, KY	Kentucky State College	20–15
12	January 20, 1911	Lexington, KY	Transylvania	23–18
13	February 27, 1911	Lexington, KY	Transylvania	22–19
14	March 3, 1911	Lexington, KY	Kentucky State College	30–24
15	November 2, 2011	Lexington, KY	Kentucky*	97–53
16	November 1, 2012	Lexington, KY	Kentucky*	76–42
17	November 5, 2012	Lexington, KY	Kentucky*	78–28
18	November 1, 2013	Lexington, KY	Kentucky*	76–42
19	October 26, 2018	Lexington, KY	Kentucky*	94–66
Series: Kentucky leads 11–8

† The score was unrecorded, but Kentucky won.

- Denotes exhibition match.

== See also ==
- List of NCAA college football rivalry games
