= Kentucky Wildcats football =

Football team of the University of Kentucky

2026 Kentucky Wildcats football team
- First season: 1881; 145 years ago
- Athletic director: J Batt
- General manager: Pat Biondo
- Head coach: Will Stein; 1st season, 7–3 (.700)
- Location: Lexington, Kentucky
- Stadium: Kroger Field (capacity: 61,000)
- NCAA division: Division I FBS
- Conference: SEC
- Colors: Blue and white
- All-time record: 661–665–44* (.499)
- Bowl record: 12–11 (.522)

National championships
- Claimed: 1950

Conference championships
- SEC: 1950, 1976* *(Retroactively awarded in 1978)
- Consensus All-Americans: 10
- Rivalries: Louisville (rivalry); Tennessee (rivalry); Vanderbilt (rivalry); Florida (rivalry); Indiana (rivalry); dormant Transylvania (rivalry); dormant Centre (rivalry); dormant

Uniforms
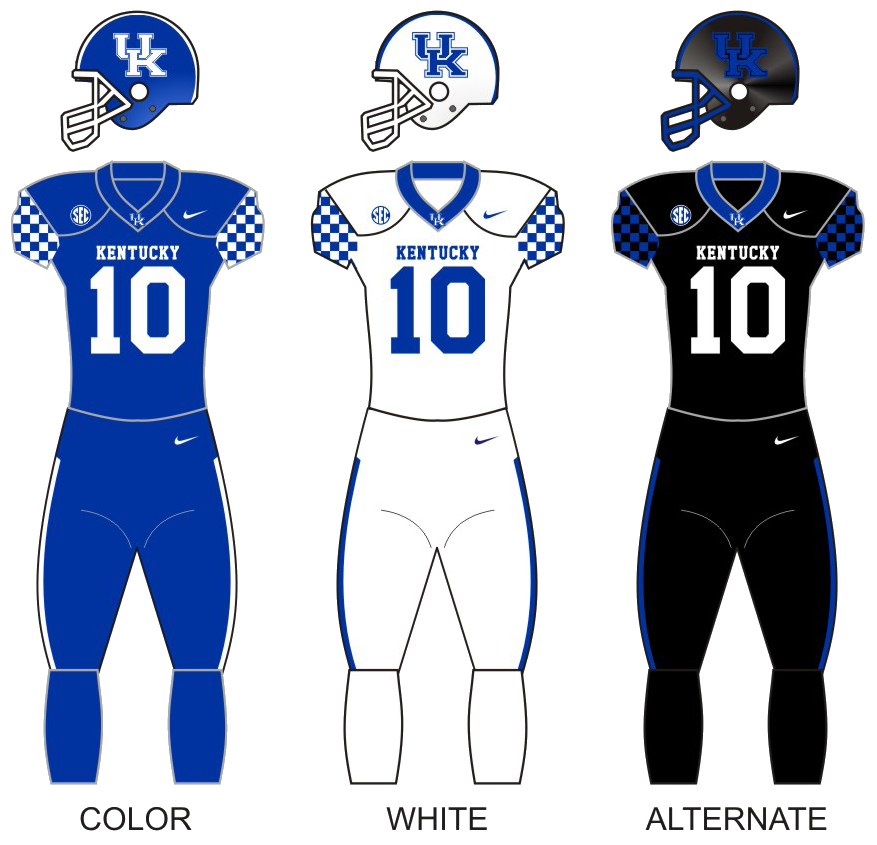
- Fight song: On, On, U of K, Kentucky Fight
- Mascot: Wildcat, Scratch
- Marching band: Wildcat Marching Band
- Outfitter: Nike
- Website: ukathletics.com

The Kentucky Wildcats football program represents the University of Kentucky in the sport of American football. The Wildcats compete in the Football Bowl Subdivision (FBS) of the National Collegiate Athletic Association (NCAA) and the Southeastern Conference (SEC). The Wildcats play their home games at Kroger Field in Lexington, Kentucky and are led by first-year head coach Will Stein.

== History ==
=== Early history (1881–1972) ===
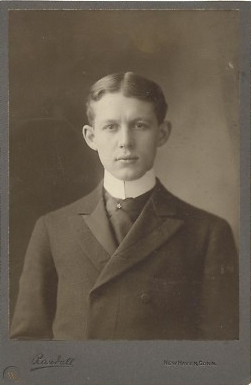
Richard C. Stoll

Until about 1913, the modern University of Kentucky was referred to as "Kentucky State College" and nearby Transylvania University was known as "Kentucky University". In 1880, Kentucky University and Centre College played the first intercollegiate football game in Kentucky. Kentucky State first fielded a football team in 1881, playing three games against rival Kentucky University. The team was revived in 1891. Both the inaugural 1881 squad and the revived 1891 squad have unknown coaches according to university records in winning two games and losing three. The 1891 team's colors were blue and light yellow, decided before the Centre–Kentucky game on December 19. A student asked "What color blue?" and varsity letterman Richard C. Stoll pulled off his necktie, and held it up. This is still held as the origin of Kentucky's shade of blue. The next year light yellow was dropped and changed to white.

The 1892 team was coached by A. M. Miller, Kentucky's first head football coach, and went 2–4–1. The greatest UK team of this era was the 1898 squad, known simply to Kentuckians as "The Immortals." To this day, the Immortals remain the only undefeated, untied, and unscored upon team in UK football history. The Immortals were coached by W. R. Bass and ended the year a perfect 7–0–0, despite an average weight of 147 pounds per player. Victories came easily for this squad, as the Immortals raced by Kentucky University (18–0), Georgetown (28–0), Company H of the 8th Massachusetts (59–0), Louisville Athletic Club (16–0), Centre (6–0), 160th Indiana (17–0) and Newcastle Athletic Club (36–0). Head coach Jack Wright led the team to a 7–1 record in 1903, losing only to rival and southern champion Kentucky University. Fred Schacht posted a 15–4–1 record in two seasons but died unexpectedly after his second season. J. White Guyn also had success leading the Wildcats, posting a 17–7–1 record in his three years. Edwin Sweetland went 16–3 in three seasons (1909–1910 and 1912) but resigned due to poor health. Sweetland also served as Kentucky's first athletics director. The 1909 team upset the Illinois Fighting Illini. Upon their welcome home, Philip Carbusier said that they had "fought like wildcats," a nickname that stuck.

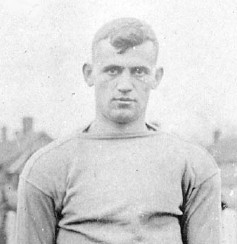
Doc Rodes.

John J. Tigert coached Kentucky for two seasons (1915–1916) with each season having one loss. 1915 captain Charles C. Schrader was All-Southern. The 1916 team fought the Southern Intercollegiate Athletic Association (SIAA) co-champion Tennessee Volunteers to a scoreless tie. The year's only a loss, 45–0 to the Irby Curry-led Vanderbilt Commodores, was the dedication of Stoll Field. Quarterbacks Curry and Kentucky's Doc Rodes were both selected All-Southern at year's end. Vanderbilt coach Dan McGugin stated "If you would give me Doc Rodes, I would say he was a greater player than Curry." Coach Harry Gamage had a 32–25–5 record during his seven seasons from 1927 to 1933. A.D. Kirwan, who would go on to be the president of the university, coached the Wildcats from 1938 to 1944 and posted a 24–28–4 record in those six seasons. Longtime athletics director Bernie Shively also served as Kentucky's head football coach for the 1945 season.

1950 Kentucky media guide

Coach Paul "Bear" Bryant was Kentucky's head football coach for eight seasons. Bear Bryant came to Kentucky from Maryland. Under Bryant's tutelage, the Wildcats won the 1947 Great Lakes Bowl, lost the 1950 Orange Bowl, won the 1951 Sugar Bowl and the 1952 Cotton Bowl Classic. In final AP polls, the Wildcats were ranked No. 11 in 1949, No. 7 in 1950, No. 15 in 1951, No. 20 in 1952 and No. 16 in 1953. The final 1950 poll was taken prior to the bowl games; Kentucky then defeated undefeated and No. 1 ranked Oklahoma in the Sugar Bowl and finished with the number 1 ranking in 3 major polls, ending the Sooners 31-game winning streak. Bryant won SEC Coach of the Year honors in 1950 and then left after eight seasons to accept the head football coach position at Texas A&M. Assistant coaches at Kentucky under Bryant who went on to become head coaches include Paul Dietzel, Frank Moseley, Jim Owens and Phil Cutchin. Notable players who played for Bryant at Kentucky include Howard Schnellenberger, Jim Mackenzie, Jerry Claiborne, Steve Meilinger, George Blanda, Vito Parilli, and Bob Gain.

Cleveland Browns assistant Blanton Collier was hired to replace Bryant as head football coach at Kentucky in late 1953. After completing his first season at Kentucky, Collier was named SEC Coach of the Year after posting a 7–2 record. Collier's assistants during his tenure at Kentucky included the likes of Bill Arnsparger, Chuck Knox, Howard Schnellenberger, and Don Shula. Despite having a winning record, 41–36–3 in eight seasons, Collier was fired. Collier struggled to recruit for much of his tenure, about which frustrated fans wrote letters of complaint to the university. Collier is the last Kentucky head football coach to leave the Wildcats with a winning record.

Charlie Bradshaw, an Alabama assistant under Bear Bryant, was hired to replace the fired Collier. Despite all the hype about being a Bear Bryant assistant, Bradshaw's tenure turned out to be a disappointment, as he was unable to have much success with the Wildcats. He had a 25–41–5 record in seven seasons. Bradshaw is the last Kentucky coach to defeat Tennessee twice in Knoxville, and the last Kentucky coach to defeat Auburn twice. He was also the last to defeat a No. 1 ranked team in the country until Rich Brooks in 2007. Bradshaw, a harsh, brutal coach, was the head coach of the infamous Thin Thirty Kentucky team. Kentucky had 88 players when Bradshaw arrived, but by season's end, only 30 players were on the team. The story of that team is told in the 2007 book The Thin Thirty by Shannon Ragland. Bradshaw also recruited Nate Northington, the first African American to play in an SEC athletic contest (1967). Notre Dame defensive coordinator John Ray took over as head football coach in late 1969. Ray's teams consistently had solid defenses, but struggled to produce on the offensive end. Ray's teams failed to win more than three games in a single season, going a dismal 10–33 overall in Ray's four seasons. Ray's contract was not renewed after the 1972 season.

=== Fran Curci era (1973–1981) ===
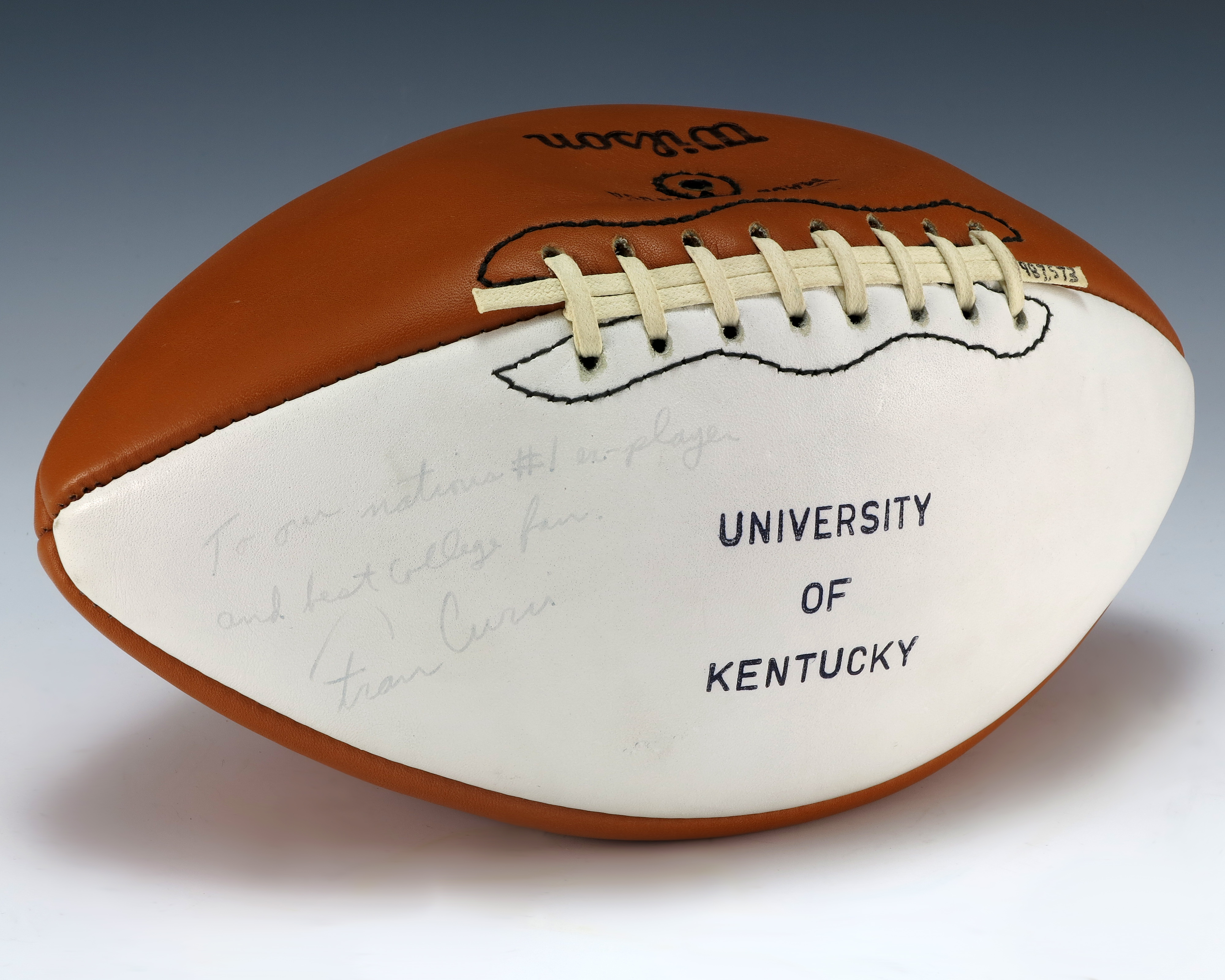
A football signed by Kentucky head coach Fran Curci and gifted to President Gerald Ford.

Kentucky hired Fran Curci away from Miami after Ray was let go. The 1976 Wildcats tallied their first winning season in 13 years and won the Peach Bowl, finishing No. 18 in the final AP poll. For all intents and purposes, however, Curci's tenure ended soon afterward, when the NCAA slapped the Wildcats with two years' probation for numerous recruiting and amateurism violations. They were banned from postseason play and live television in 1977. The most damaging sanction in the long term, however, was being limited to only 25 scholarships in 1977 and 1978. The 1977 Kentucky team went 10–1, went undefeated in SEC play, won a share of the SEC title and finished the season ranked No. 6 in the AP poll. Due to the sanctions, however, the Wildcats were not able to go to a bowl. Kentucky finished at No. 6 and Penn State at No. 5 despite the fact that Kentucky defeated Penn State at Penn State during the regular season. Curci was unable to put together another winning team as a result of the reduced scholarships, and was fired after the 1981 season.

=== Jerry Claiborne era (1982–1989) ===
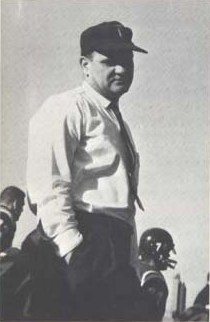
Coach Claiborne

Coach Jerry Claiborne returned to his alma mater from Maryland. After going 0–10–1 in 1982, he led the Wildcats to the 1983 Hall of Fame Bowl and the 1984 Hall of Fame Bowl, defeating a Wisconsin team ranked No. 20 in the polls to finish the season with a 9–3 record and a No. 19 ranking in the final AP and UPI polls. Claiborne also won SEC Coach of the Year honors in 1983. The E.J. Nutter Training Facility was built in 1987. Coach Claiborne and Kentucky experienced an era of constant change at the quarterback position following the 1987 season through his departure that included Ransdell, Wright, and High School All-American and two way starter (Quarterback/Safety) Ricky Lewis, prior to landing Mr. Kentucky Football Awardee Pookie Jones of Calloway County. Claiborne retired following the 1989 season and was inducted into the College Football Hall of Fame as a coach in 1999. He was the last coach to defeat Tennessee until Joker Phillips in 2011 and the last coach to defeat Florida until Mark Stoops in 2018. His final record at Kentucky is 41–46–3.

=== Bill Curry era (1990–1996) ===
Bill Curry surprised the college football world by leaving Alabama for Kentucky in late 1989. Despite the high hopes that the Kentucky football program would rise under his leadership, Curry's Wildcats teams never achieved much success. The Wildcats' best season under Curry was 1993, going on to play Clemson in the 1993 Peach Bowl. It would be his only winning season in seven years. On the other side of the spectrum, his 1994 team went 1–10, the worst record in modern program history. Curry was asked to resign midway through the 1996 season; he refused and was fired, but was allowed to coach the final five games of '96. The Wildcats were 26–52 (.333) under Curry.

=== Hal Mumme era (1997–2000) ===
Coach Hal Mumme came to Kentucky from Valdosta State and brought an exciting, high-scoring, pass-oriented offense known as the "Air Raid". He led the Wildcats to the 1998 Outback Bowl and the 1999 Music City Bowl. Mumme achieved a 20–26 record in his four seasons. Mumme coached star quarterback Tim Couch, the top overall pick in the 1999 NFL draft. Mumme was popular among the Kentucky fans, but the program was hit with severe sanctions for NCAA violations involving cash payments from an assistant coach to prospective recruits. Mumme resigned after the 2000 season. Assistant coaches under Mumme at Kentucky included Mike Leach and Sonny Dykes. Mumme is the last Kentucky coach to beat Alabama.

=== Guy Morriss era (2001–2002) ===
Guy Morriss was promoted from offensive line coach to head coach of the Wildcats after Mumme's resignation. Under coach Morriss, the Wildcats went 2–9 in 2001 but improved to a 7–5 record in 2002. However, the Wildcats were not eligible for postseason play in 2002 due to NCAA sanctions from Mumme's tenure. The most significant event of that season came in a loss to LSU (See: Bluegrass Miracle). Morriss accepted an offer to become the head football coach at Baylor after the 2002 season.

=== Rich Brooks era (2003–2009) ===
After Morriss's departure, athletics director Mitch Barnhart initially pursued former Georgia head coach Jim Donnan, but Donnan decided not to accept an offer from Barnhart to coach the Wildcats. Ultimately, Barnhart turned to former Oregon head coach Rich Brooks, who was hired in December 2002. Brooks' hiring was met with skepticism from a significant portion of the Wildcats' fanbase, as he had not coached at the college level in nine years at the time of his hiring and had little to no recruiting ties in the southern United States. In his first season, Kentucky finished 4–8 overall with a 1–7 Southeastern Conference record. The 2003 season included a seven-overtime 71–63 loss to Arkansas at Commonwealth Stadium, later renamed Kroger Field. The Wildcats went on to lose their remaining games against Vanderbilt, University of Georgia, and University of Tennessee. Coach Brooks then posted a 2–9 overall and 1–7 conference result in 2004, followed by an improved 3–8 overall and 2–6 SEC conference standing in 2005.

Brooks led the team out of the probationary years to an 8–5 regular season record in 2006, including a memorable upset over the defending SEC champion Georgia, snapping a nine-game losing streak to the Bulldogs. Brooks also led the football team to its first bowl game since 1999 and its first bowl game victory since 1984, as Kentucky defeated the Clemson University Tigers 28–20 in the Music City Bowl on December 29, 2006. In 2007, the Wildcats were ranked 8th in the nation before a loss to South Carolina on October 4. After the loss to South Carolina, Kentucky bounced back on October 13 to defeat the No. 1 LSU 43–37 in a historic triple overtime game.

Brooks took Kentucky to four consecutive bowl games, winning the first three. The 2007 Kentucky Wildcats football defeated the Florida State Seminoles 35–28 in the 2007 Music City Bowl in Nashville, Tennessee, on December 31, 2007. Quarterback Andre' Woodson was named the Music City Bowl MVP for the second year in a row. In 2008, the Wildcats opted to go to the Liberty Bowl instead of the Music City Bowl and defeated Conference USA champion East Carolina 25–19. In 2009, Brooks and Kentucky returned to the Music City Bowl, losing in a rematch to Clemson 21–13. Brooks retired after seven seasons with a 39–47 overall record. Ultimately, Brooks' tenure is held in high regard by the Wildcats despite the losing record and failing to defeat annual opponents Florida, Tennessee and South Carolina during the Brooks era. On July 10, 2023, the playing field at Kentucky's new indoor practice facility was named after Rich Brooks and his wife, Karen.

=== Joker Phillips era (2010–2012) ===
On January 6, 2010, former Wildcat wide receiver and longtime assistant coach Joker Phillips was formally introduced as head coach after Brooks' retirement; he had been Brooks' designated successor since 2008. Kentucky started off strong under Phillips with a win on the road against archrival Louisville. The 2010 squad snapped a long-standing losing streak to South Carolina Coach Steve Spurrier by defeating the Gamecocks at Kroger Field. However, they dropped games to both Ole Miss and Mississippi State, lost to a Florida team on a down year and once again failed to beat its other archrival Tennessee, having lost 26 in a row to the Vols, the longest active losing streak by one team to another in college football at the time. The Wildcats capped the season with a 27–10 loss to Pittsburgh in the BBVA Compass Bowl. On November 26, 2011, Kentucky snapped the longest active FBS losing streak to any one team by defeating the Tennessee Vols 10–7 at Kroger Field. On November 4, 2012, the day after a 40–0 home shutout by Vanderbilt resulting with a 1–9 record, UK athletics director Mitch Barnhart released a public letter to Big Blue Nation announcing that Phillips would not return for the 2013 season, but that he would finish out the 2012 season as head coach. With Joker's five-year contract only being three years complete at the end of the season, the university had to pay a $2.55 million buyout over the final two years of the contract.

=== Mark Stoops era (2013–2025) ===
==== 2012–2015 seasons ====
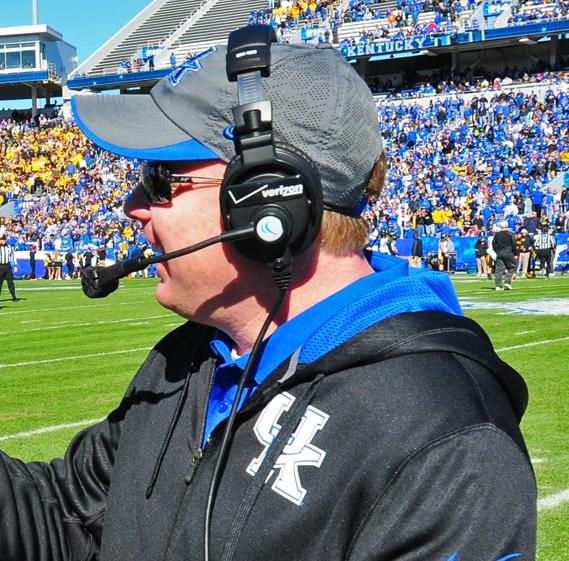
Coach Stoops

On November 27, 2012, Florida State defensive coordinator Mark Stoops, brother of legendary former Oklahoma head coach Bob Stoops, was hired as Kentucky's head football coach. Stoops had no prior head coaching experienced when he was hired. One of Stoops' first moves was hiring offensive coordinator Neal Brown, who brought back the "Air Raid" offense. After nine months as the head coach of the Wildcats, Stoops and his staff signed the highest ranked recruiting class in program history.

Stoops's first season at Kentucky was a struggle, as the Wildcats duplicated the 2–10 record from 2012. Kentucky's wins in 2013 were over a winless Miami (OH) and FCS opponent Alabama State. In Stoops's second season, the Wildcats broke a 17-game SEC losing streak when they beat Vanderbilt the fourth game into the season. The Wildcats finished the 2014 season with a 5–7 record.

After the season, offensive coordinator Neal Brown left to take the head coaching job at Troy. In 2015, Stoops's third season, the Wildcats duplicated their 5–7 record from 2014. They lost to Florida, Auburn, Mississippi State, Tennessee, Georgia, Vanderbilt, and Louisville, and they defeated Louisiana-Lafayette, South Carolina, Missouri, Eastern Kentucky and Charlotte.

==== 2016 season ====
On December 18, 2015, offensive coordinator Shannon Dawson, who was hired to replace Neal Brown, announced he would not return to the program for the 2016 season as the offensive coordinator, a result of the team's struggles over the previous few years. In his place Kentucky hired Cincinnati offensive coordinator Eddie Gran as the assistant head coach of offense at Kentucky. Cincinnati quarterbacks coach Darin Hinshaw has also joined the UK staff as quarterbacks coach and co-offensive coordinator. Kentucky began the 2016 season with a loss to Southern Miss by a score of 44–35, after blowing a 25-point lead. Ironically, Shannon Dawson, who was fired by Kentucky as offensive coordinator just months earlier, had been hired to serve as Southern Miss' offensive coordinator. Kentucky would finish 7–6 (4–4 SEC) on the season, which included snapping a five-game losing streak to archrival Louisville by a score of 41–38, with a berth in the TaxSlayer Bowl, their first bowl berth since 2010, a game they lost to Georgia Tech by a score of 33–18.

==== 2017 season ====
In the 2017 season, the Wildcats opened the season with a victory over Southern Mississippi in Hattiesburg 24–17. The next week, the Wildcats defeated the Eastern Kentucky Colonels in their home opener at the newly renamed Kroger Field in Lexington. Following a road victory over the South Carolina Gamecocks, they failed to defeat the Florida Gators, whom they had not defeated since 1986. This extended the longest losing streak in SEC history to 31 years. Responding to the criticized loss to Florida, the Wildcats defeated Eastern Michigan and Missouri at Kroger Field, improving their record to 5–1. Following their bye week, the Kentucky Wildcats fell to No. 19-ranked Mississippi State team on the road, 45–7. However, the Wildcats improved to 6–2 by defeating the Tennessee Volunteers by a score of 29–26 at Kroger Field. The victory over Tennessee was Kentucky's second victory since 1984 over the Volunteers, and secured bowl eligibility. This was followed by a 37–34 home loss to Ole Miss and a dominating road win over unranked Vanderbilt. The Wildcats then lost to Georgia 42–13 in Athens, Georgia. In their last regular season game against rival Louisville, Kentucky was beaten at home 44–17. Kentucky then proceeded to play Northwestern in Nashville, Tennessee in the Music City Bowl on December 29, and lost 24–23.

==== 2018 season ====
In 2018, after beating Central Michigan, Kentucky went to Gainesville to face the Florida Gators, who had won 31 straight against Kentucky, and ended their losing streak with a 27–16 win at The Swamp, the Wildcats' first win in Gainesville since 1979. They added wins in the next two weeks over Murray State and No. 14 Mississippi State, the second of which put Kentucky into the Top 25, the Wildcats' first ranking since 2007. They then split the next two games, defeating South Carolina for the fifth straight season before losing for the first time, an overtime loss to Texas A&M on the road. After the bye week, Kentucky defeated Vanderbilt at home then beat Missouri on the road thanks to a last second TD pass. Those wins put the Wildcats at 7–1 and No. 9 in the College Football Playoff Rankings leading in to a home game against the Georgia Bulldogs. In a matchup that determined the SEC East Division champion, the Wildcats were defeated at home 34–17. Kentucky then went on the road at Tennessee, falling to the Volunteers by a score of 24–7, ending their final SEC record at 5–3, the team's first winning season in conference play since 1977. In Kentucky's final home game of the season, senior day, the Wildcats defeated Middle Tennessee by a score of 34–23. Kentucky closed the regular season with a 56–10 rout of Louisville to win back the Governor's Cup. Kentucky was selected to play in the Citrus Bowl in Orlando, Florida against No. 12 ranked Penn State, and won 27–24. This capped only the third 10-win season in school history, and the first since 1977. The Wildcats finished ranked No. 12 in the AP poll, the first such end-season rank since the 1984 season.

==== 2019–2021 seasons ====
In 2019, Kentucky had a special season when Wide Receiver Lynn Bowden took became the Wildcats Quarterback, when both Terry Wilson (QB 1) and Sawyer Smith (QB 2) were injured. Kentucky ended the season 8–5, after beating (in order): Toledo, Eastern Michigan, Arkansas, Missouri, Vanderbilt, Tennessee-Martin, Louisville and Virginia Tech in the Belk Bowl in a last minute touchdown drive by Kentucky, and a scoop and score to use up the last few seconds of the game. Their five losses were (in order): Florida, Mississippi State, South Carolina, Georgia Bulldogs and Tennessee. In 2020, Kentucky had unique season, despite their final losing record. They were initially ranked at No. 22 in their first game with Auburn. Their final record in the season was 5–6, with 4–6 in the conference (during the COVID-19 Pandemic NCAA regulations). Kentucky went on to beat: Mississippi State, Tennessee, Vanderbilt, South Carolina, and North Carolina State in the Gator Bowl. Kentucky's losses were to (in order): Auburn, Mississippi, Missouri, Georgia Bulldogs, Alabama and Florida. This season saw the Wildcats win in Knoxville for the first time since 1984. In 2021, Kentucky saw more history making for both the entire program and Mark Stoops. Their final record was 10–3, which was Kentucky's second 10-win season, and the 4th time in program history, after beating (in order): Louisiana Monroe, Missouri, UT-Chattanooga, South Carolina, Florida, LSU, Vanderbilt, New Mexico State, Louisville and the Iowa Hawkeyes in the VRBO Citrus Bowl. Their three losses were back-to-back-to-back with: Georgia Bulldogs, Mississippi State, and Tennessee. The Wildcats saw their first win against Florida at home since 1986 and finished ranked No. 18 in the AP poll. The program also got a winning record with 638–635–44 (.501), and a bowl record of 12–9 (.571), after the season concluded. For Stoops, he managed to get a winning record for the first time, with 59–53 (.527).

==== 2022 season ====
The Wildcats and head coach Mark Stoops carried their momentum into the 2022 season where they defeated the Florida Gators at Ben Hill Griffin Stadium for the second time in three attempts after a 31-year drought to the Gators outright prior to the 2018 season. The same week, Stoops surpassed Paul "Bear" Bryant as the all-time winningest coach at The University of Kentucky. Kentucky would go on to win games against Youngstown State University and Northern Illinois University, where they would be ranked #7 in AP Polls, the highest rank in Stoops' tenure, before dropping their first loss in the season in Oxford, Mississippi to Ole Miss. They finished the year with a 7–6 overall and 3–5 in conference play at the end of the Regular Season. The win at Missouri clinched bowl eligibility for the 7th consecutive season for the Wildcats, the longest in Kentucky school history. Kentucky went on to beat (in order): Miami (OH), Florida, Youngstown State University, Northern Illinois University, Mississippi State, Missouri and Louisville. Kentucky's losses were to (in order): Ole Miss, South Carolina, Tennessee, Vanderbilt, Georgia Bulldogs, and the Iowa Hawkeyes in the Music City Bowl. As of the beginning of the 2023 football season, Mark Stoops going into his 11th season with a 66–59 overall record, and 32–50 conference record, with the Kentucky Wildcats.

==== 2025 season and firing of Stoops ====
In 2025, the Wildcats were coming off their worst season since head coach Mark Stoops' first season in 2013, having gone 4–8. The team started off 2–1 with wins against Toledo and Eastern Michigan, along with a close loss to No. 20 Ole Miss 30–23. They then lost four consecutive games, at South Carolina; at No. 12 Georgia; vs. No. 21 Texas, losing in overtime 13–16; and vs. No. 17 Tennessee. The team won their next three games: Auburn, Florida, and Tennessee Tech. Going into the final two weeks of the season, the Wildcats sat at 5–5 and entered the final two games, needing one more win to earn bowl eligibility for the first time in 2 seasons. They would lose to No. 14 Vanderbilt 17–45 and lose at rival Louisville 0–41. Head coach Mark Stoops was fired on December 1, 2025, after failing to get the team bowl eligible for back-to-back seasons. Stoops' final record with the Kentucky Wildcats was 72–80 (.475) due to the 10 vacated wins from 2022. Not counting the vacated wins, his final record was 82–80 (.509). Stoops, being three years into his eight-year, $9-million-per-year contract, was subject to a buyout of $38 million within 60 days of the firing. The same day, Stoops and the University of Kentucky came to an agreement, spreading the buyout over multiple years.

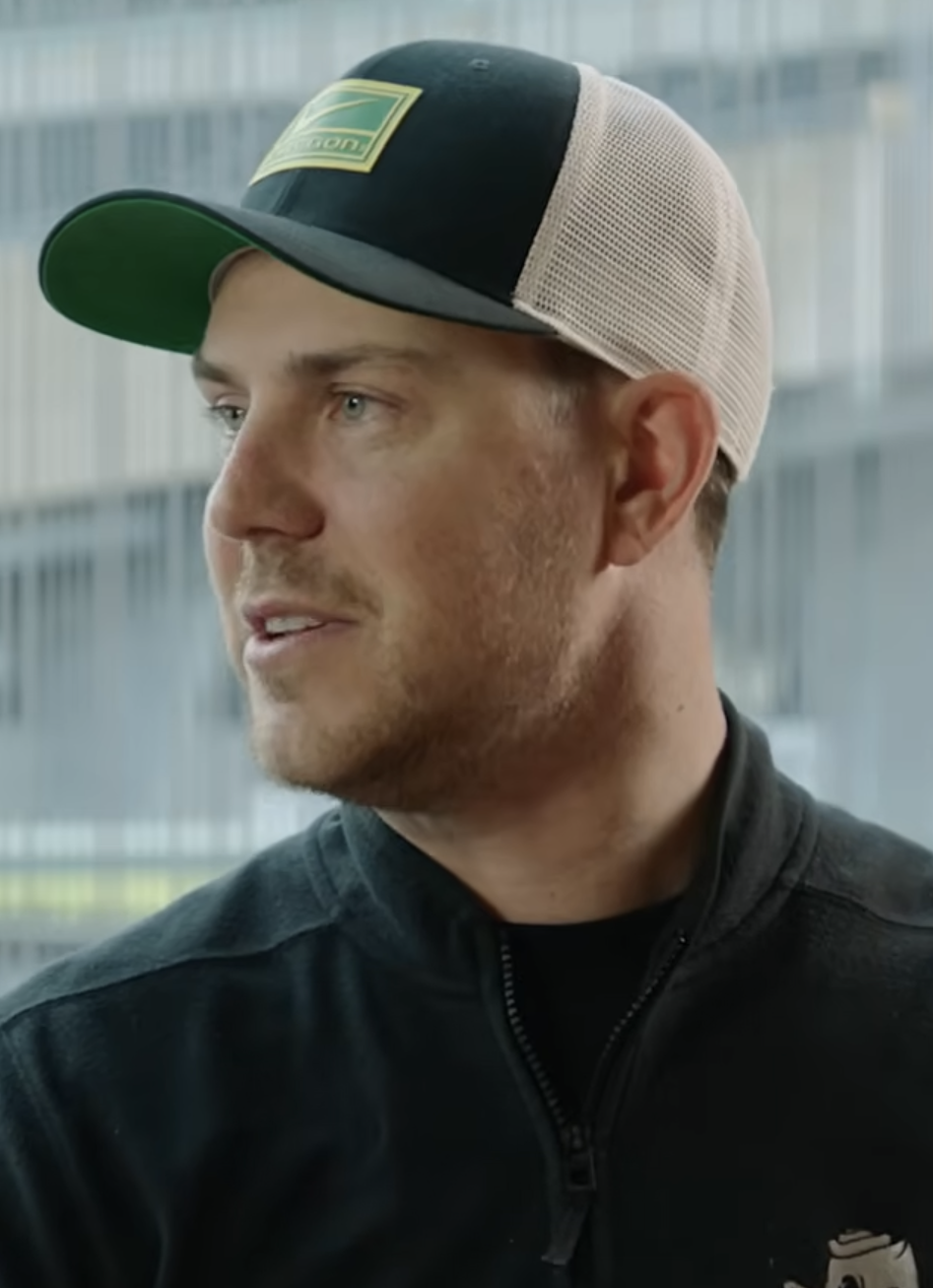
Coach Stein during his time at Oregon

=== Will Stein era (2026–present) ===
On December 1, 2025, after the firing of Mark Stoops; Oregon offensive coordinator Will Stein was hired as the next head coach of Kentucky Wildcats football.

==== 2026 Season ====
Stein's first season with the Wildcats has started out the best for a first year coach at Kentucky since 1913, with a record of 6–1 and 2 AP Top 10 wins. After opening with a win against Youngstown State, Kentucky would lose their home opener against No. 12 Alabama 45–17. Kentucky would then proceed to win their next game in a Top 10 upset, beating No. 9 Texas A&M 31–21 in College Station. This would be Stein's first SEC win and Kentucky's 3rd Top 10 win on the road since 2023, leading the nation. Kentucky would then head home and trounce South Alabama 45–21. Kentucky would become ranked for the first time since 2023, and would head to Columbia, SC to face South Carolina. The Cats would start down 17–0 in the second quarter, but would come back and win on a 2-point conversion in overtime, 35–34. That would be the largest comeback on the road in school history. Following this win, Kentucky would host No. 10 LSU for homecoming, as the Wildcats would don the Power K logo for the first time since the Bill Curry era. Kentucky would win the game in overtime 35–34 on a 2-point conversion again, marking the first time an FBS team won back-to-back overtime games by 1 point. Kentucky would be ranked 15th following this win, their highest since 2022. Kentucky would then travel to Oklahoma and would defeat the Sooners 21–13, moving up in the rankings to 12th in the AP, and starting 3–0 in road SEC play for the first time since 1977. The Wildcats then returned to Lexington to face Vanderbilt, beating them handily 34–17, and rising to 9th in the AP. This would be their 5th win in the SEC for only the 6th time in school history, and 7–1 would be the best record for a first year coach at Kentucky since 1909.

== Conference affiliations ==
Kentucky has been a member of the Southeastern Conference since its founding in 1932.

- Independent (1881–1895)
- Southern Intercollegiate Athletic Association (1896–1904)
- Independent (1905–1911)
- Southern Intercollegiate Athletic Association (1912–1921)
- Southern Conference (1922–1932)
- Southeastern Conference (1932–present)

== Championships ==
=== National championships ===
The NCAA has never officially recognized a national champion from among the bowl coalition institutions, but in 2004 the NCAA commissioned Jeff Sagarin to use his computer model to retroactively determine the highest ranked teams for the years prior to the BCS. His champion for the 1950 season is Kentucky. The polls for the 1950 national champion, taken before the bowl games were played, list either Oklahoma (AP, Berryman, Helms, Litkenhous, UPI, Williamson), Princeton (Boand, Poling), or Tennessee (Billingsley, DeVold, Dunkel, Missouri, Don Faurot Football Research, National Championship Foundation, Sagarin (ELO-Chess)). Tennessee was the winner of the Cotton Bowl and the only team to beat Kentucky during the 1950 season. Oklahoma was named national champion by AP and UPI Coaches' Poll, both which awarded their titles before the bowl games. Kentucky would go on to beat Oklahoma in the Sugar Bowl. Sports writer Bill Libby, not an NCAA-designated "major selector", selected Kentucky as national champions in his 1975 book Champions of College Football.

Season	Coach	Selector(s)	Record	Bowl	Opponent	Result	Final AP	Final Coaches
1950	Bear Bryant	Sagarin Ratings, Bill Libby (Note: Not an NCAA-designated major selector.)	11–1	Sugar Bowl	Oklahoma	W 13–7	No. 7	No. 7

=== Conference championships ===
Kentucky has won two conference championships, both in the Southeastern Conference. On May 23, 1978, it was reported that Mississippi State would forfeit their 1976 win over Kentucky, giving Kentucky an official 5–1 conference record and a share of the SEC title with Georgia.

Kentucky also finished the 1977 season with a 10–1 (6–0 SEC) record but were not eligible for a share of the SEC championship or for postseason play due to NCAA probation placed on them in December 1976.

Season	Conference	Coach	Overall Record	Conference Record
1950	SEC	Paul "Bear" Bryant	11–1	5–1
1976‡ (retroactive co-champion)	SEC	Fran Curci	9–3	5–1

== Bowl games ==
UK has played in 23 bowl games, compiling a record of 12–11. Note that in the table below, the year references the season, and not the actual date the game was played.

Season	Coach	Bowl	Opponent	Result
1947	Bear Bryant	Great Lakes Bowl	Villanova	W 24–14
1949	Bear Bryant	Orange Bowl	Santa Clara	L 13–21
1950	Bear Bryant	Sugar Bowl	Oklahoma	W 13–7
1951	Bear Bryant	Cotton Bowl Classic	TCU	W 20–7
1976	Fran Curci	Peach Bowl	North Carolina	W 21–0
1983	Jerry Claiborne	Hall of Fame Classic	West Virginia	L 16–20
1984	Jerry Claiborne	Hall of Fame Classic	Wisconsin	W 20–19
1993	Bill Curry	Peach Bowl	Clemson	L 13–14
1998	Hal Mumme	Outback Bowl	Penn State	L 14–26
1999	Hal Mumme	Music City Bowl	Syracuse	L 13–20
2006	Rich Brooks	Music City Bowl	Clemson	W 28–20
2007	Rich Brooks	Music City Bowl	Florida State	W 35–28
2008	Rich Brooks	Liberty Bowl	East Carolina	W 25–19
2009	Rich Brooks	Music City Bowl	Clemson	L 13–21
2010	Joker Phillips	BBVA Compass Bowl	Pittsburgh	L 10–27
2016	Mark Stoops	TaxSlayer Bowl	Georgia Tech	L 18–33
2017	Mark Stoops	Music City Bowl	Northwestern	L 23–24
2018	Mark Stoops	Citrus Bowl	Penn State	W 27–24
2019	Mark Stoops	Belk Bowl	Virginia Tech	W 38–30
2020	Mark Stoops	Gator Bowl	NC State	W 23–21
2021	Mark Stoops	Citrus Bowl	Iowa	W* 20–17
2022	Mark Stoops	Music City Bowl	Iowa	L 0–21
2023	Mark Stoops	Gator Bowl	Clemson	L 35–38
2026	Will Stein	TBD	TBD	

- Kentucky vacated all 2021 wins in August 2024.

== Rivalries ==
=== Centre ===
This historical series was first contested in 1891 with the last game being played in 1929. With Centre currently competing at the NCAA Division III level, the in-state opponents are unlikely to meet on the football field anytime soon.

=== Florida ===
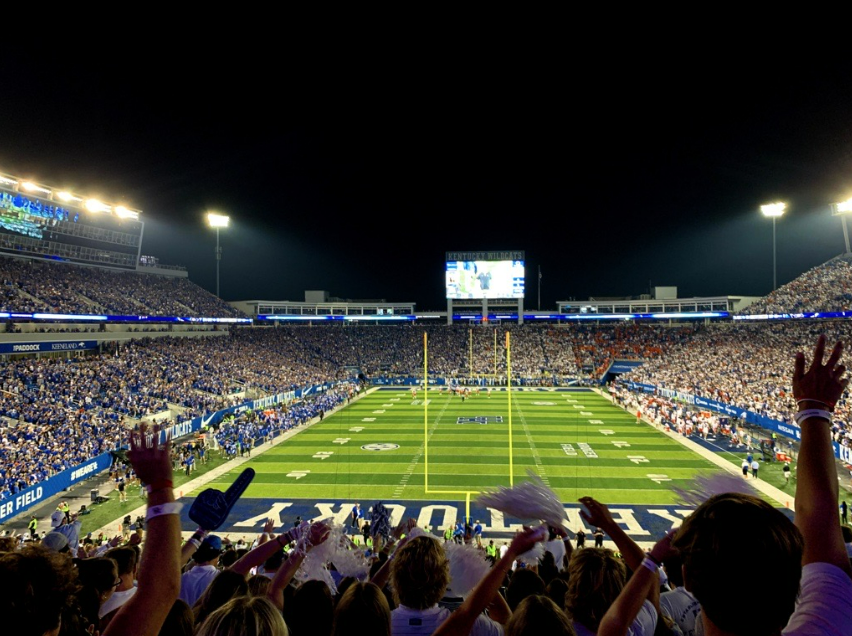
Kroger Field during the 2021 Florida–Kentucky game in which Kentucky would win 20–13.

When the Southeastern Conference split into geographical divisions in 1992, Florida and Kentucky were both placed in the SEC East. This guarantees that both teams play each other every season, which they have done consecutively since 1967. The Gators and Wildcats will meet in 2024 despite the end of SEC divisions after the 2023 season. The two teams have played 74 times, with Florida holding a 53–21 lead in the series. From 1987 to 2017, Florida won every single game between the two schools. This 31-year streak was the third longest in FBS history, and the longest in the Southeastern Conference's history. Since 2017, the series has become incredibly competitive with a 4–3 split between the two teams with the winning margin being 11.4 points on average. Because of these factors, this rivalry is relatively new even though the series dates back to 1917.

Former Florida head coach Steve Spurrier was notable for having a particular disdain for Kentucky. During his tenure at Florida, he was known for running up the score in non-competitive games. In his 12 years coaching the Gators, Spurrier never lost to Kentucky, winning by an average score of 32.7 points. Spurrier was famous for the comments he made about his opponents (often referred to as "Spurrierisms") but he poked fun at Kentucky the most. Even after leaving Florida, Steve Spurrier would go out of his way to make comments at Kentucky's expense. In November 2004, Steve Spurrier accepted the head coaching job at the University of South Carolina. In 2006, the South Carolina Gamecocks upset their rival, the Clemson Tigers. In the following week, Clemson would go on to lose to Kentucky in the 2006 Music City Bowl. Following the bowl game, Steve Spurrier said" "We thought we had done something good beating Clemson. And then Kentucky beat 'em."

=== Indiana ===
The Wildcats also have an out-of-conference rivalry with Indiana. The Hoosiers played the Wildcats annually from 1987 until 2005 in what was known as the "Bourbon Barrel" game. The two teams played for a trophy called the "Bourbon Barrel" from 1987 until both schools mutually agreed to retire the trophy in 1999 following the alcohol-related death of a Kentucky football player. The two teams last met on September 17, 2005, with Indiana winning 38–14; Indiana leads the overall series (18–17–1).

=== Louisville ===
First played in 1912, Louisville-Kentucky football series was revived in 1994 after the success of the basketball series that restarted in 1983. They played the first four games of the renewed series at Commonwealth Stadium (now Kroger Field) until Papa John's Cardinal Stadium (PJCS) was completed in 1997, at which time they began rotating the series between Louisville, Kentucky and Lexington, Kentucky. The two teams play for the Governor's Cup Trophy. Kentucky leads the series 20–15, but trails the modern series 15–14. Kentucky played Louisville in the Cardinals' first 4 seasons and twice in the 1920s, holding the Cardinals scoreless in all contests. Kentucky then left the SIAA in 1922 to become a charter member of the Southeastern Conference and limited its play of in-state schools. It would be 70 years before these two in-state rivals faced each other again.

In 2013, it was announced that the game would be moved to the final game of the season following Louisville's 2014 move to the ACC. This scheduling change fits with other end-of-year SEC vs. ACC rivalry games, such as Georgia vs. Georgia Tech, Florida vs. Florida State and South Carolina vs. Clemson.

In 2018, Kentucky beat Louisville 56–10, winning by the largest margin since the rivalry restarted in 1994. The largest ever win in the rivalry was also by Kentucky which they won 73–0 in 1922, before the series went dormant.

In 2019, Kentucky beat Louisville 45–13. Kentucky quarterback Lynn Bowden broke the SEC record for yards rushing by a QB in a game with 284 total individual rushing yards. Also, the Wildcats broke their single game rushing record with 517 rushing yards against the Cardinals. In 2025 Louisville shut out Kentucky 41–0. It is the largest margin of victory in the series for the Cardinals and Louisville's first win over the Wildcats at home since 2014.

Kentucky leads the series 20–17 as of the conclusion of the 2025 season.

=== Tennessee ===
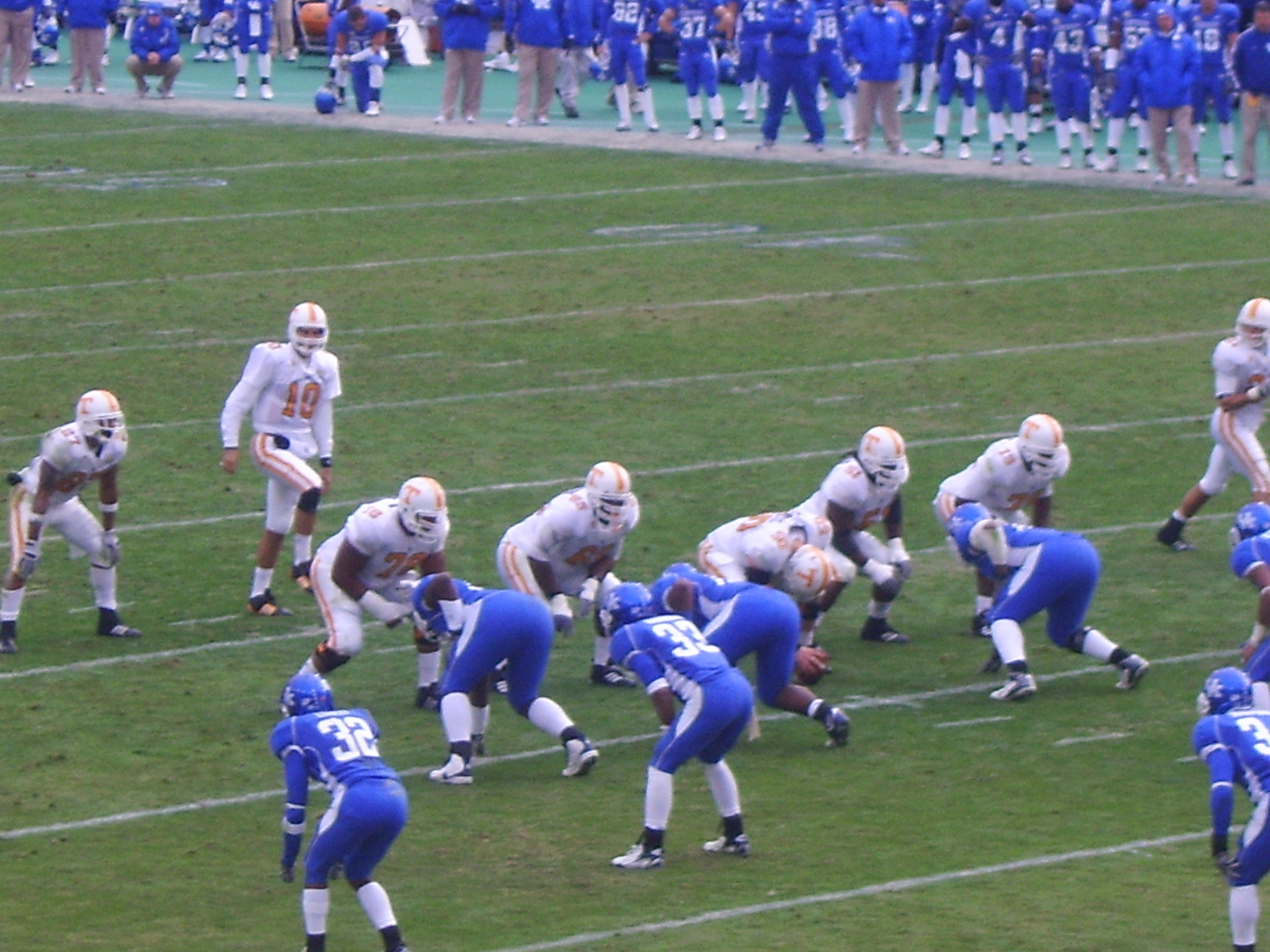
The 2007 game between Kentucky and Tennessee.

Like many college football rivalries, the Tennessee-Kentucky game had its own trophy for many years: a wooden beer barrel painted half blue and half orange. The trophy was awarded to the winner of the game every year from 1925 to 1997. The Barrel was introduced in 1925 by a group of former Kentucky students who wanted to create a material sign of supremacy for the rivalry. It was rolled onto the field that year with the words "Ice Water" painted on it to avoid any outcries over a beer keg symbolizing a college rivalry. The barrel exchange was retired in 1998 after two Kentucky football players died in an alcohol-related crash.

Tennessee leads the series 86–26–9 as of the conclusion of the 2025 season.

=== Transylvania ===
In 1880 Transylvania faced Centre in the first intercollegiate game in the state. The next year Transylvania played three games Kentucky with Transylvania winning two of the three. The schools would play regularly after that for the couple decades. By the early part of the 20th century, the football game between the two schools became the "highlight of the college sports season" for the fans of the two schools and the citizens of Lexington. As the game became more popular, "the rivalry became more bitter." To capitalize on the popularity of the rivalry, the game was usually played on Thanksgiving so that the large gate could solve the team's financial problems.

Throughout the early years of the rivalry accusations on both sides concerning the use of professional players. This issue came to a head in 1903. Transylvania claimed that Kentucky's coach, C.W. Wright went to New York to recruit players for the game to replace the current team of student-athletes. Kentucky responded by pointing out that two players, Hogan and Worth Yancey, on Transylvania had played professional baseball the summer before the season. The Lexington Herald covered for the Crimson by stating the Yancey brothers only used the money for college expenses. Tensions were also high because earlier in the season, a riot broke out a scrimmage between the two schools' second teams resulting in that game not being finished. Over 300 students, players, and fans were involved. Some participants wielded clubs and buggy whips resulting in several injuries. With both teams coming into the game with outstanding records, the past issues and accusations did not damper the enthusiasm for the game. The local papers reported, "no other event had generated more interest in the city than the impending contest." With all the excitement the price of admission more than doubled, and extra grandstands were installed around the field to make room for the anticipated crowd. Fans across the state charted special trains for the game. Transylvania easily won 17–0 with UK fans saying they should have used their regular player instead of the ringers from the East coast. Afterward, UK president Patterson had the select committee investigate the accusations of bringing in out of state ringers. The committee confirmed that both the faculty and the athletic association had recruited professionals for the game. After the report came out head coach C.W. Wright was fired. The game resulted in unwanted national attention and was given as an example of the problems in college football. Because of this, Southern Intercollegiate Athletic Association (SIAA) blackballed both schools for several years.

=== Vanderbilt ===
Having started in 1896, the Kentucky-Vanderbilt football series has been played annually since 1953. The two are divisional opponents in the SEC East. The series rotates annually between Nashville, Tennessee and Lexington, Kentucky. Kentucky leads the series 49–45–4 through the conclusion of the 2025 season.

== Individual awards and honors ==
=== All-Americans ===
Consensus All-Americans in bold.

Player	Position	Year	Unanimous	Consensus	Selectors
Clyde Johnson	T	1942	No	No	AP
Bob Gain	T	1949	No	No	All-Players, NY Sun, NEA
**Bob Gain**	T	1950	Yes	Yes	AP, UPI, INS, Camp, NEA, CP, FWAA-Look, AAB, FD, NYNews
**Babe Parilli**	QB	1950	Yes	Yes	AP, INS, Camp, Colliers, NY News, Sporting News, AA
**Bob Gain**	QB	1951	Yes	Yes	UP, INS, Camp, NEA, CP, AAB, NY News, All-Player
Doug Moseley	C	1951	No	No	AP, FWAA-Look
Steve Meilinger	DE	1952	No	No	AP, NEA, All-Player
Steve Meilinger	DE	1953	No	No	NEA, Colliers, AAB
Ray Correll	DG	1953	No	No	FWAA-Look, Chicago Tribun
Howard Schnellenberger	DE	1955	No	Yes	AP
**Lou Michaels**	OT	1956	No	Yes	UPI, NA, Camp, Colliers, NY News
**Lou Michaels**	OT	1957	No	Yes	AP, NEA, Camp, FWAA-Look, Coaches, NY News, Sporting News
Irv Goode	C	1961	No	No	Time
Herschel Turner	T	1963	No	No	Time
**Sam Ball**	T	1965	No	Yes	UPI, NEA, Camp, FWAA-Look, Coaches, Time, Sporting New
Rodger Bird	HB	1965	No	No	Time, NBC
Rick Norton	QB	1965	No	No	Time, NBC
Elmore Stephens	TE	1974	No	No	Time
Rick Nuzum	C	1974	No	No	NEA
Warren Bryant	T	1976	No	No	Camp, Coaches
**Art Still**	DE	1977	No	Yes	AP, UPI, NEA, Coaches, FWAA, Camp, Sporting News, Football News
Mike Pfeifer	T	1989	No	No	Football News, Mizlou
Tim Couch	QB	1998	No	No	Camp, FWAA, AAF
**James Whalen**	TE	1999	No	Yes	AP, Camp, FWAA, AAFF, CNN/SI, CBS SportsLine
**Derek Abney**	KR	2002	Yes	Yes	AP, FWAA, Camp, Sporting News, ESPN, CBS SportsLine, CNN/SI, College Football News
Glenn Pakulak	P	2002	No	No	CBS SportsLine
Randall Cobb	WR	2010	No	No	AP
**Josh Allen**	LB	2018	Yes	Yes	AP, WCFF, SI, CFN, ESPN, CBS Sports, Sporting News
Bunchy Stallings	OG	2018	No	No	AP
**Lynn Bowden**	WR/KR/QB	2019	No	Yes	AFCA, AP, The Athletic, CBS Sports, ESPN, SI, Sporting News, USA Today
**Max Duffy**	P	2019	Yes	Yes	AFCA, AP, The Athletic, ESPN, FWAA, Sporting News, USA Today, WCFF
**Darian Kinnard**	OT	2021	No	Yes	AFCA, AP, CBS, FWAA, WCFF

=== First Team All-SEC ===
Year	Player	Position
1983	Duece Howerton	RB
1993	Marty Moore	LB
1994	Melvin Johnson	FS
1995	Moe Williams	HB
1997	John Schlarman	OG
1998	Kris Comstock	OG
1998	Tim Couch	QB
**1998**	**Craig Yeast**	**WR**
1999	Andy Smith	P
1999	Jeff Snedegar	LB
**1999**	**James Whalen**	**TE**
2000	Derek Smith	TE
2000	Omar Smith	OT
2001	Derek Abney	KR
2001	Dennis Johnson	DE
2001	Glenn Pakulak	P
2002	Derek Abney	KR
2002	Antonio Hall	OT
2002	Glenn Pakulak	P
2002	Artose Pinner	RB
2003	Derek Abney	KR
2003	Antonio Hall	OT
2005	Rafael Little	All-Purpose
2006	Keenan Burton	All-Purpose
2006	Jacob Tamme	TE
2006	Wesley Woodyard	LB
**2007**	**Jacob Tamme**	**TE**
2007	Wesley Woodyard	LB
2008	Micah Johnson	LB
2008	Trevard Lindley	DB
2008	Tim Masthay	P
2009	Randall Cobb	All-Purpose
2010	Randall Cobb	All-Purpose
2010	Danny Trevathan	LB
2011	Danny Trevathan	LB
2014	Alvin Dupree	DE
2014	Landon Foster	P
2016	Jon Toth	C
2017	Benny Snell	RB
2018	Josh Allen	LB
2018	Benny Snell	RB
2018	Bunchy Stallings	OG
2019	Lynn Bowden	All-Purpose
2019	Max Duffy	P
2019	Drake Jackson	C
2019	Logan Stenberg	OG

=== SEC Player of the Year ===
Year	Player	Position
1950	Babe Parilli	QB
1957	Lou Michaels	T
1973	Sonny Collins	RB
1998	Tim Couch	QB

=== SEC Offensive Player of the Year ===
Year	Player	Position
2002	Artose Pinner	RB

=== SEC Defensive Player of the Year ===
Year	Player	Position
2018	Josh Allen	LB

=== SEC Coach of the Year ===
Year	Player
2018	Mark Stoops

=== SEC Freshman of the Year ===
Year	Player	Position
1996	Derick Logan	RB

=== Academic All-American of the Year ===
Year	Player	Position
2022	Will Levis	QB

=== Bednarik Award ===
Year	Player	Position
2018	Josh Allen	LB

=== Nagurski Award ===
Year	Player	Position
2018	Josh Allen	LB

=== Outland Trophy ===
Year	Player	Position
1950	Bob Gain	DT

=== Paul Hornung Award ===
Year	Player	Position
2019	Lynn Bowden	WR/KR/QB

=== Ray Guy Award ===
Year	Player	Position
2019	Max Duffy	P

=== Wuerffel Trophy ===
Year	Player	Position
2017	Courtney Love	LB

== Retired numbers ==
Kentucky Wildcats retired numbers
No.	Player	Pos.	Tenure	No. ret.	Ref.
21	Calvin Bird	HB	1958–1960	1997	
22	Mark Higgs	RB	1984–1987	1997	

== Hall of Famers ==
=== Pro ===
Two Kentucky players have been inducted into the Pro Football Hall of Fame.

Inductee	Position	Class	Team and Career
George Blanda	QB, K	1981	Chicago Bears, 1949, 1950–58; Baltimore Colts, 1950; Houston Oilers, 1960–66; Oakland Raiders, 1967–75
Dermontti Dawson	C	2012	Pittsburgh Steelers, 1988–2000

=== College ===
Eight Kentucky Wildcat individuals have been inducted into the College Football Hall of Fame.

Inductee	Position	Class	Career
Paul "Bear" Bryant	Head coach	1986	1946–53
Jerry Claiborne	Head coach	1999	1982–89
Tim Couch	QB	2024	1996-98
Bob Gain	G, T	1980	1947–1950
Steve Meilinger	DL	2013	1951–53
Lou Michaels	DT	1992	1955–57
Babe Parilli	QB	1982	1949–51
Art Still	DE	2015	1974–1977

== Future opponents ==
=== Conference opponents ===
From 1992 to 2023, Kentucky played in the East Division of the SEC and played each opponent in the division each year along with several teams from the West Division. The SEC expanded the conference to 16 teams and eliminated its two divisions in 2024, causing a new scheduling format for the Wildcats to play against the other members of the conference. Only the 2024 conference schedule was announced on June 14, 2023, while the conference still considers a new format for the future. The 2025 conference schedule was announced on March 20, 2024, in which teams will play the same opponents in 2025 that they played in 2024, with sites changed for equal home and away competition over the course of the two seasons.

==== 2025 Conference Schedule ====
Opponent	Site	Result
at Auburn	Jordan–Hare Stadium; Auburn, AL	
Florida	Kroger Field; Lexington, KY	
at Georgia	Sanford Stadium; Athens, GA	
Ole Miss	Kroger Field; Lexington, KY	
at South Carolina	Williams–Brice Stadium; Columbia, SC	
Tennessee	Kroger Field; Lexington, KY (rivalry)	
Texas	Kroger Field; Lexington, KY	
at Vanderbilt	FirstBank Stadium; Nashville, TN (rivalry)	

==== Non-conference opponents ====
Announced schedules as of September 17, 2026.

2026	2027	2028	2029	2030	2032
Youngstown State; Sep 5	Murray State; Aug 28	Eastern Illinois; Aug 26	Georgia Southern; Sep 1	Kent State; TBA	Toledo; Sep 4
South Alabama; Sep 26	Ball State; Sep 25	Kent State; Sep 9	Eastern Kentucky; Sep 8		
Louisville; Nov 28	at Louisville; Nov 27	Louisville; Nov 25	at Louisville; Nov 24	Louisville; Nov 30	

== See also ==
- American football in the United States
- College football

== Bibliography ==
- Stanley, Kent (1996), Before Big Blue: Sports at the University of Kentucky, Lexington: The University Press of Kentucky, pp. 25–36, ISBN 0-8131-1991-X
