= Barbara Yancy =

American politician (1934–1996)

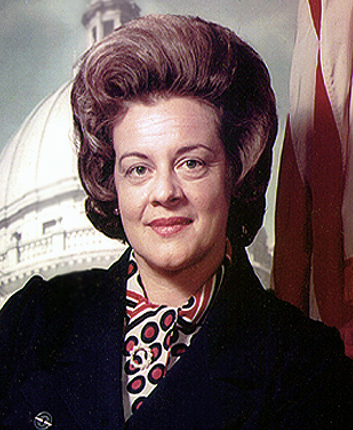

Member of the Mississippi State Senate
- In office January 5, 1971 – January 4, 1972

Personal details
- Born: Barbara Young; March 25, 1934 Vardaman, Mississippi, U.S.
- Died: April 24, 1996 (aged 62) Jackson, Mississippi, U.S.
- Party: Democratic
- Spouse: Jesse L. Yancy Jr.
- Children: 3
- Education: University of Mississippi

Barbara Young Yancy (née Young; March 25, 1934 – April 24, 1996) was an American politician who served in the Mississippi State Senate from 1971 to 1972. A member of the Democratic Party, she won the special election to fill the Senate seat of her husband, Jesse L. Yancy Jr., who died in 1970. She later worked for Governor Cliff Finch as the director of the Governor's Action Line, a state-run helpline.

== Early life ==
Barbara Young was born on March 25, 1934, in Vardaman, Mississippi. She was a 10th generation Mississippian and attended Calhoun City High School in Calhoun City, Mississippi. Shortly after graduating from high school, she married Jesse L. Yancy Jr., an attorney who was elected to the Mississippi State Senate in 1967, representing Calhoun, Chickasaw, Clay, and Monroe counties. They lived in Bruce, Mississippi, and had three children: Tom, Cindy, and Jesse. Barbara helped with writing her husband's speeches in his successful campaigns for district attorney and state senate.

== Career ==
After Jesse Yancy Jr. died of a heart attack on August 26, 1970, a special election was held to fill his Senate seat. According to Barbara, Jesse's friends and supporters encouraged her to run for the open seat. She later said that the campaign "kept me away from the house and gave me something to think about other than myself and my problems". In the November 1970 election, she defeated Houston cattleman Mackie Weaver by approximately 3,400 votes. She was sworn in on January 5, 1971, becoming the third woman in the state senate that year, alongside Berta Lee White and Jean D. Muirhead. Lieutenant Governor Charles L. Sullivan appointed Yancy as vice chairman of the Senate Elections Committee, which Jesse Yancy had chaired. Court-ordered redistricting in May 1971 placed Yancy in the same senatorial district as state senator Tommy Brooks. She later announced that she would not seek re-election in the 1971 elections, and worked on Cliff Finch's unsuccessful campaign for lieutenant governor that year.

After leaving the state senate, Yancy worked as a receptionist in the state auditor's office. She enrolled in the University of Mississippi when she was 38 years old and majored in social work. During the governorship of Cliff Finch, she was the director of the Governor's Action Line, a state-run public information service that provided assistance to callers. Yancy was a vocal advocate of the "Displaced Homemakers Bill", a bill in the Mississippi legislature that would provide counseling, health care, and job training for widowed or divorced women. She gave a series of lectures across Mississippi discussing displaced homemakers, frequently citing her own experiences after the death of her husband as well as the experiences of women who called into the Governor's Action Line.

In the 1980s and early 1990s, she worked at the Mississippi Department of Wildlife, Fisheries, and Parks, and was the assistant to the director of the parks division.

== Death ==
Yancy died from heart failure at her home in Jackson, Mississippi, on April 24, 1996.

== See also ==
- Widow's succession
