= John Yancey =

John Yancey may refer to:

- John Yancey (tennis) (born 1970), American professional tennis player
- John Derek Yancey or Illa J (born 1986), American rapper
- John F. Yancey (1826-1903), American hotelier and concessionaire
- John H. Yancey (1918-1986), American soldier
