= Senator Combs =

Senator Combs may refer to:

- Jeanne Combs (born 1955), Nebraska State Senate
- Thomas A. Combs (1868–1935), Kentucky State Senate
