= Transylvania Pioneers football =

Football program representing Transylvania University

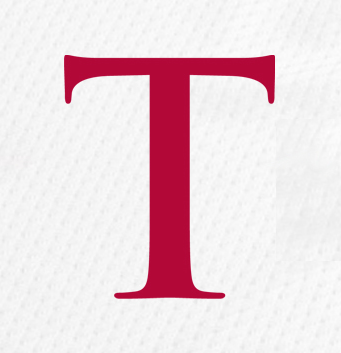
- First season: 1880
- Last season: 1941
- Location: Lexington, Kentucky
- Stadium: Thomas Field (stadium)
- Colors: Crimson and white

Conference championships
- 1 (1903)
- Rivals: Georgetown (KY); Kentucky

The Transylvania Pioneers football team represented Transylvania University. They were formerly known as "Kentucky University" until 1908 (the University of Kentucky was then known as "Kentucky State College"). They have not competed in football since 1941. It last competed as a member of the Southern Intercollegiate Athletic Association.

== History ==
Transylvania won the first recorded football game in the state of Kentucky by defeating the Centre Praying Colonels of Centre College 13¾ – 0 on April 9, 1880. The team's rivalry with Kentucky began the following year of 1881. The two schools played three games, with Transylvania winning two of them. Its 1903 team claimed a southern championship. Later Lexington mayor Hogan Yancey was a star fullback on that team. Happy Chandler played both football and baseball at Transylvania in 1921. If Transylvania won an away football game the campus community was notified by the blowing of the steam whistle at the Power Plant. The program had a 26–37–2 record in its final eight seasons.

Transylvania's biggest rival was Georgetown.
