= Jesse L. Yancy Jr. =

American politician

Jesse L. Yancy Jr. (January 16, 1926 in Springville, Mississippi – August 26, 1970 in Bruce, Mississippi) was an American politician who served as state senator in the Mississippi State Senate from 1968 till his death in 1970. He was succeeded in his senate seat by his wife Barbara Yancy.
