= Mary Yancey =

American ceramic artist (1902–1992)

Mary Yancey

Mary Yancey Hodgdon (1902–1992) was a ceramic artist and designer from Alabama who worked in Louisiana, Ohio, Iowa, Massachusetts, and California. Along with Paul Cox, she co-founded an art pottery outreach program at Iowa State College that sold thousands of ceramic wares across the country.

== Biography ==
Born Mary Lanier Yancey in 1902, she grew up in Birmingham, Alabama until moving to Louisiana around 1919. She enrolled in Newcomb College, a women's liberal arts institution that had a strong program in art and design. She participated in the Newcomb Pottery program, which taught students ceramic design and allowed them to sell their wares for-profit. The style of her ceramics, even after leaving the college, was similar to the work that was created under the Newcomb Pottery program. She won multiple prizes during her studies and graduated in 1922 with a bachelor's degree in design.

After graduation, Mary Yancey moved to Cincinnati, Ohio and taught ceramics and jewelry to high school students until 1924. She was then hired by Iowa State College in the ceramic engineering department to teach modeled pottery. While at Iowa State College, Yancey and department head Paul Cox created an ISC art pottery program modeled after Newcomb's own.

In 1930, Yancey married Frank Hodgdon, a former Iowa State College student, and moved to Massachusetts. She continued to produce pottery independently and founded Clay Craft Studios in 1931. In 1933, she became a faculty member of Fullerton Junior College, a position she held until retirement in 1962.

== Iowa State College Art Pottery ==
The ceramic engineering department of Iowa State College was founded in 1906 and modeled pottery had been a subject in the department since 1915. The class sizes were growing quickly, with both men from the engineering department and women from the home economics program enrolling. Mary Yancey was hired by the department Head, Paul Cox, in 1924 to meet class demands.

Cox had worked on the Newcomb Pottery program as a technician and admired the program's model of turning ceramics education into a profitable venture. He believed that Iowa needed to diversify its industrial economy beyond agriculture and saw the clay and stone deposits of the state as possible routes to this end. Cox and Yancey began the Iowa State College art pottery program in 1924. Cox served as technician, throwing the base ceramics, and Yancey as designer, incising motifs and painting the glaze. The duo also engaged in outreach on behalf of the program, attending campus and state events to advertise and sending ceramics on display all over the country.

Yancey's designs were like those used in Newcomb Pottery, although her and Cox used local Iowa clays and enamels. They sold the wares from anywhere between $2.50 and $50, and made an estimated $10,000 from seven or eight hundred pieces over a six-year period. The ceramics have a distinct style and can be identified by maker's marks on the bottom. Mary Yancey left Iowa State College in 1930 and the art pottery program halted soon after. Paul Cox lost administrative support for the program fully in 1932 and the Great Depression made sales plummet even before then. Yancey's independent ceramics after her time at Iowa State College retained a similar style.
