= Berta Lee White =

Mississippi state legislator (1914–2004)

Berta Lee White (1914 – 2004) was a state legislator in Mississippi. She went by Bert for her first name. She served with the Mississippi Farm Bureau Federation which offers a scholarship in her honor. While serving in the legislature she pursued a degree from the University of Southern Mississippi in Hattiesburg, graduating with a Bachelor of Science and Arts degree in Political Science.

A concurrent resolution honored her.
