= Jack Wright (American football) =

American football player, coach, and judge (1871–1931)

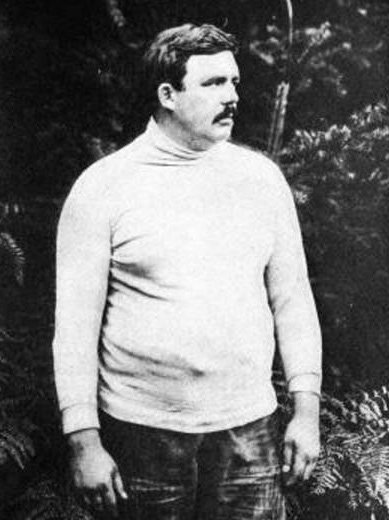
- Wright pictured in The Tyee 1903, Washington yearbook

Biographical details
- Born: October 30, 1871; Moravia, New York, U.S.
- Died: October 27, 1931 (aged 59); Auburn, New York, U.S.
- Education: Williams College (1897); Columbia Law School (1902)

Playing career
- 1896: Williams
- 1899–1900: Columbia
- Position: Guard

Coaching career (HC unless noted)
- 1901: Washington
- c. 1902: Columbia (assistant)
- 1903: Kentucky State College

Head coaching record
- Overall: 14–9

Accomplishments and honors

Awards
- 2× second-team All-American (1899, 1900)

Charles A. "Jack" Wright (October 30, 1871 – October 27, 1931) was an American college football player and coach. He served as the head football coach at the University of Rochester in 1897, the University of Washington in 1901, and Kentucky State College—now known as the University of Kentucky—in 1903, compiling a career college football coaching record of 14–9. Wright earned a degree from Columbia Law School in 1902 and later worked as a judge. He died in 1931 after suffering a heart attack. At the time of his death, he was candidate for the Cayuga County judge as well as the city recorder for Auburn, New York.

== Head coaching record ==
Year	Team	Overall	Conference	Standing	Bowl/playoffs
Rochester Yellowjackets (Independent) (1897)
1897	Rochester	5–5			
Rochester:		5–5			
Washington (Independent) (1901)
1901	Washington	3–3			
Washington:		3–3			
Kentucky State College Blue and White (Southern Intercollegiate Athletic Association) (1903)
1903	Kentucky State College	6–1	0–0		
Kentucky:		6–1	0–0		
Total:		14–9			
