= Jean Muirhead =

Mississippi politician

Jean Muirhead (May 12, 1929 - July 15, 2011) was a lawyer and judge who served in the Mississippi Senate in 1968 and 1970. A Democrat, she lived in Jackson and represented Hinds County. She was an advocate for women's rights. She had three children.

She was born in Tallahatchie County. She authored legislation to allow women on state court juries. She appointed girl pages in the senate even though they had been relegated to a "special" week when they were allowed to serve. She told a political opponent who said women had no place in the smoky motel rooms where politicking was carried out that if she were elected, she would do her legislating at the State Capitol instead of motel rooms. A senate concurrent resolution honoring her was published by the Mississippi Senate after her death.

She was defeated by Democrat James Donald Spann. She challenged his eligibility due to his having had felony convictions. He was deemed qualified.

She died in 2011.
