= Worth B. Yancey =

American baseball player and football coach (1879–1912)

Biographical details
- Born: July 3, 1879; Kentucky, U.S.
- Died: August 26, 1912 (aged 33); Lexington, Kentucky, U.S.

Playing career

Football
- 1900–1902: Kentucky University
- 1907–1908: Bethany (WV)

Baseball
- 1906: Americus Pallbearers
- Positions: Fullback, halfback

Coaching career (HC unless noted)

Football
- 1907–1908: Bethany (WV)

Head coaching record
- Overall: 9–6–1

Worth Bryan Yancey (July 3, 1879 – August 26, 1912) was an American college football player and coach and minor league baseball player. He served as the head football coach at Bethany College in Bethany, West Virginia from 1907 to 1908.

Yancey attended Kentucky University—know known as Transylvania University—Lexington, Kentucky, where he played football. He earned a Bachelor of Arts degree from Bethany College in 1909.

Yancey played for the Americus Pallbearers of the Georgia State League in 1906. He also managed the Lexington Baseball Club. Yancey died on August 26, 1912, at his mother's home in Lexington, following a 17-month-long illness.

== Head coaching record ==
Year	Team	Overall	Conference	Standing	Bowl/playoffs
Bethany Bison (Independent) (1907–1908)
1907	Bethany	6–2			
1908	Bethany	3–4–1			
Bethany:		9–6–1			
Total:		9–6–1			
