= John F. Yancey =

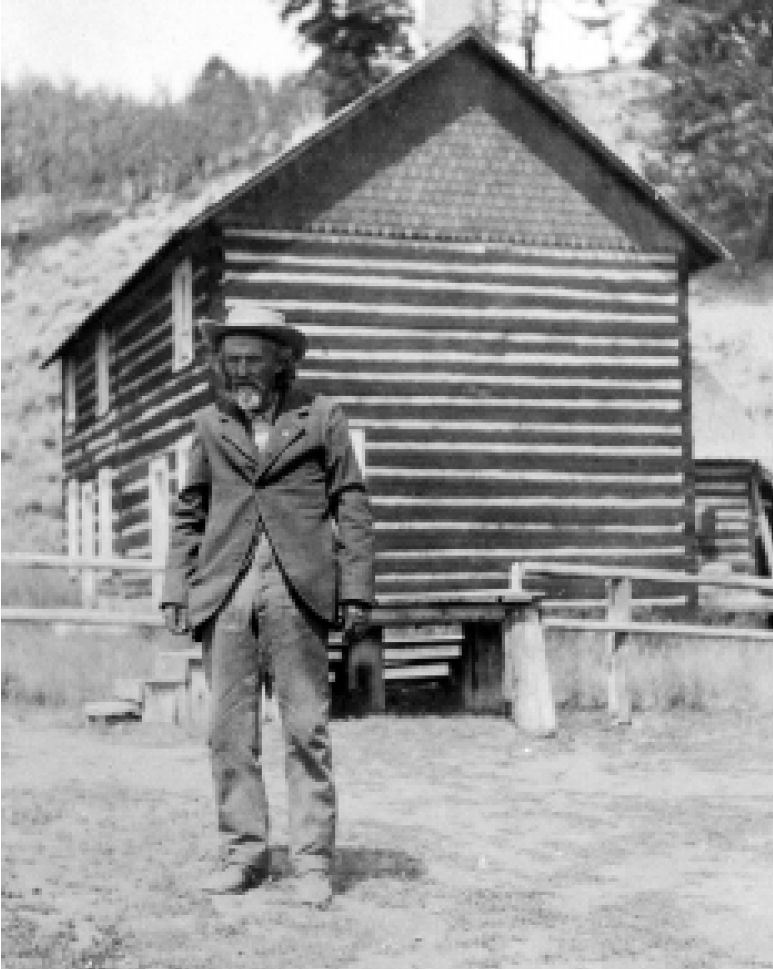
- John F. Yancey, circa 1900
- Born: c. 1826; Barren County, Kentucky, US
- Died: May 7, 1903; Gardiner, Montana, US
- Resting place: Tinker's Cemetery, Gardiner, Montana; 45°2′5″N 110°43′25″W
- Other names: Uncle John Yancey
- Occupation: Yellowstone Park Concessionaire

John F. Yancey also known as Uncle John Yancey (born c. 1826 Barren County, Kentucky, died May 7, 1903) was a Yellowstone National Park concessionaire who operated Yancey's Pleasant Valley hotel near Tower Junction in Yellowstone from 1882 until his death in 1903.

== Early life ==
Very little is known about John Yancey's early life in Kentucky, although it is believed he was related in some way to William Lowndes Yancey, an Alabama politician and secessionist. Yancey was sixth of ten children and his parents moved to Missouri while he was a young boy where he grew to manhood. He participated in the American Civil War on the side of the Confederacy, but to what extent is unknown. In the 1870s, shortly after the creation of Yellowstone National Park, he turned up as a prospector in the area of the Crevice Creek gold strike on the northern boundary of the park. He apparently made enough money from prospecting to establish a way station on the Gardiner to Cooke City road inside the park in 1882. Owen Wister, who met Yancey during a visit in 1896, described him as a "goat-bearded, shrewd-eyed, lank, Uncle Sam type".

== Pleasant Valley Hotel ==
Pleasant Valley is located just north of the Tower-Roosevelt junction on the Yellowstone River Trail, at 44°55′46″N 110°25′17″W. The valley lies adjacent to the Yellowstone River near the site of Barronett's Bridge and the confluence of the Lamar River. The valley was named by Philetus Norris, the second superintendent of the park (1877–82).

In 1882, then park superintendent Patrick Conger gave John Yancey verbal permission to establish a cabin in Pleasant Valley to enable him to provide accommodations and provisions to the stage traveling to and from Mammoth Hot Springs to Cooke City, Montana. The mining camps in Cooke City were well established and the route through Pleasant Valley was the only way in and out of Cooke City in winter. In April 1884, the Department of the Interior granted Yancey a 10-acre (40,000 m^{2}) lease in Pleasant Valley to establish a hotel. Soon thereafter, Yancey constructed a five-room hotel he named" Yancey's Pleasant Valley Hotel. Rooms were $2/day and $10/week with meals. A guest of the hotel in 1901 described it thus:

We asked to be shown to our rooms. A pink checked little maid leads the way up a stairway of creaking, rough boards and when we reach the top announces that the lady and her husband, meaning me and my daughter, can take Room No. 1. The little hallway in which we are standing is formed by undressed boards and the doors leading from it have large numbers marked upon them in chalk from one to five. Inspection of the bedrooms prove them to be large enough for a single bedstead with a box on which are washbowl, pitcher and part of a crash towel. Of the four window lights, at least one was broken in each room. The cracks in the wall are pasted up with strips of newspaper. No. 1, being the bridal chamber, was distinguished from the others by a four by six looking glass. The beds showed they were changed at least twice, once in the spring and once in the fall of the year. A little bribe on the side and a promise to keep the act of criminality a secret from Uncle John induces the maid to provide us with clean sheets.

— Carl E. Schmide, A Western Trip, 1910

== Death ==
John F. Yancey was 77 years old in April 1903 when he traveled to Gardiner, Montana, to witness the dedication of the Roosevelt Arch by President Theodore Roosevelt on April 24, 1903. Although Yancey witnessed the dedication and apparently met President Roosevelt during the dedication ceremony, he caught a cold and died in Gardiner of pneumonia on May 7, 1903. He is buried in Tinker's Cemetery in Gardiner, within the national park boundaries, approximately 0.5 miles (0.80 km) northwest of Gardiner on the old Yellowstone Trail road.

Yancey's obituary in the Livingston Post contained the following:

One by one the frontiersmen who opened up the west to civilization are dropping away, ... The last to answer the summons of the grim reaper was John Yancey, lovingly called Uncle John by all his acquaintances. His death occurred at the home of C. B. Scott in Gardiner last Thursday afternoon. The announcement of his demise carried grief and sorrow to the hearts of all who knew him. His rugged manhood, quick sympathy, broad charity, loving kindness and unswerving honor had endeared him to every person with whom he came in contact. ... Uncle John's personality attracted to him many prominent men throughout the land, and he numbered among his personal friends not only President Roosevelt, but a great many senators and congressmen, many of whom made annual visits to his home.

— Livingston Post, May 14, 1903

== Gallery ==
Images of John F. Yancey and Yancey's Pleasant Valley Hotel
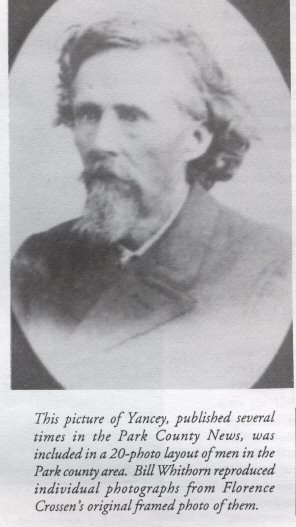
Undated portrait

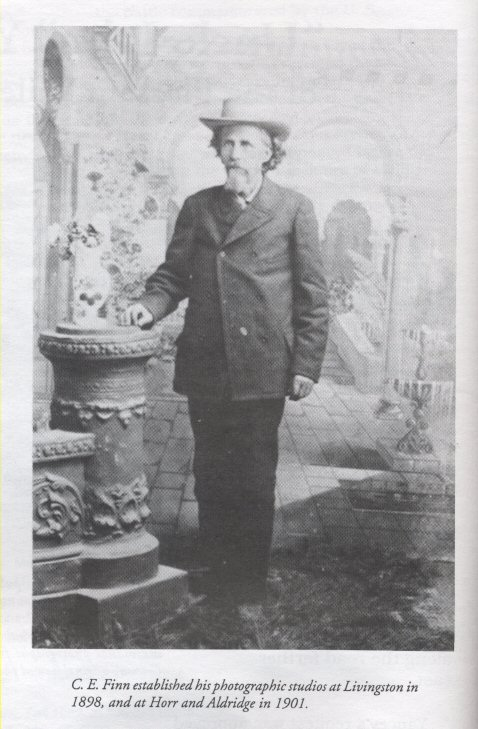
Standing portrait, ca 1900

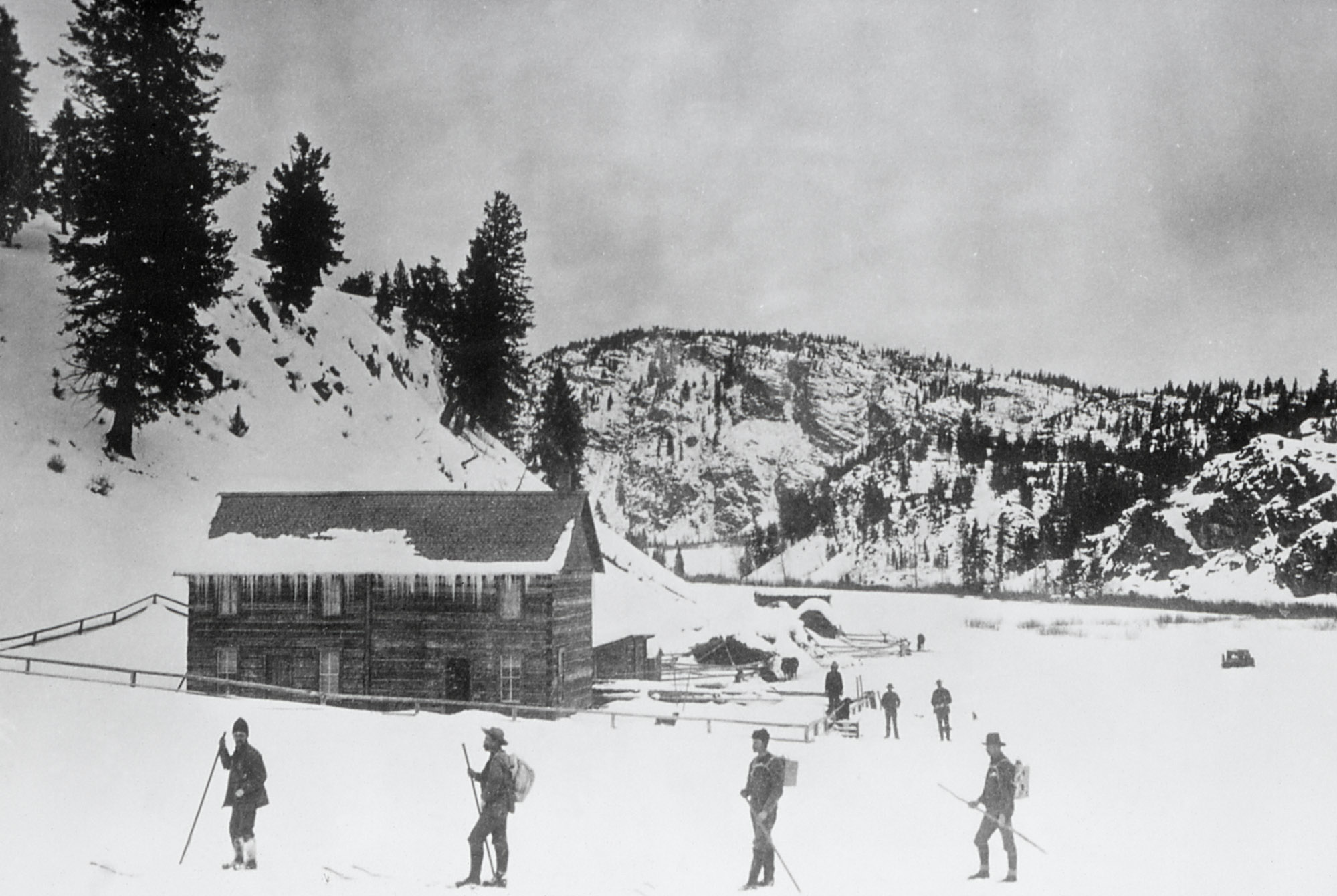
Frank Jay Haynes Winter Tour, 1887 at Yanceys

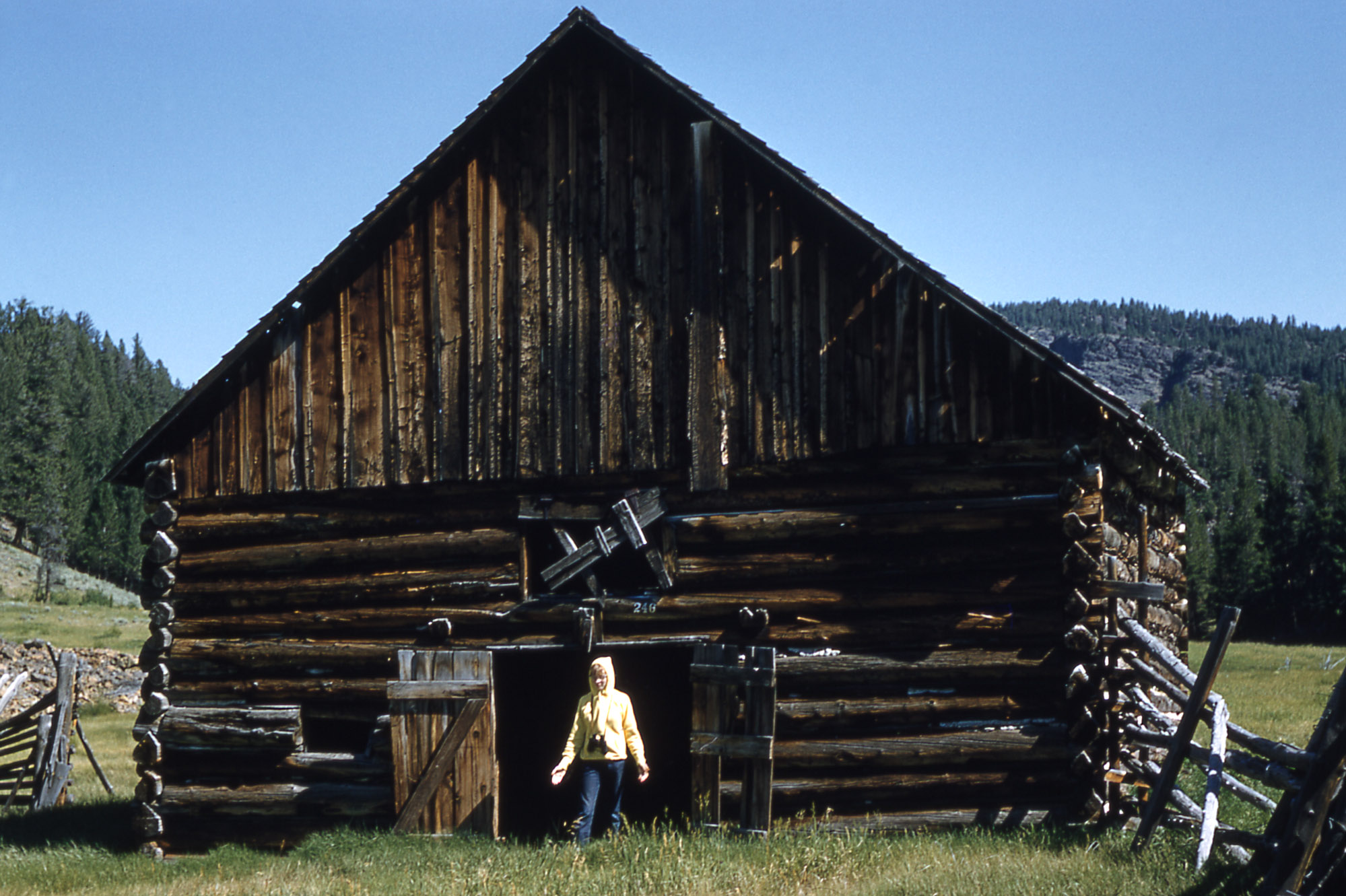
An original building from Yancey's, built 1887

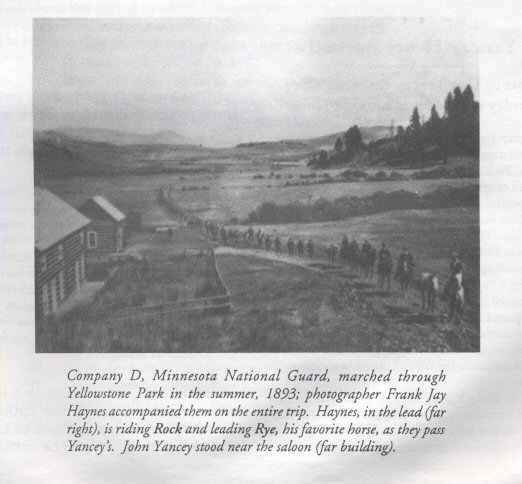
Yancey's, 1893 with U.S. Cavalry

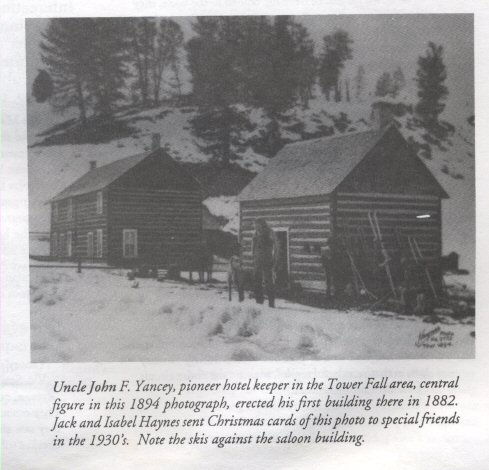
Yancey's, 1894

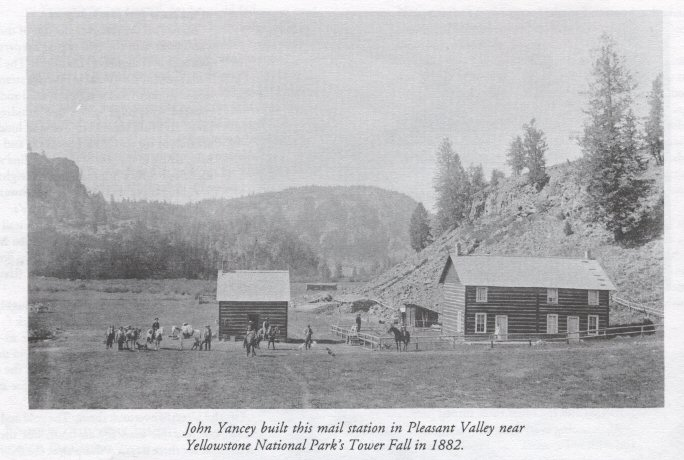
Yancey's, ca 1900

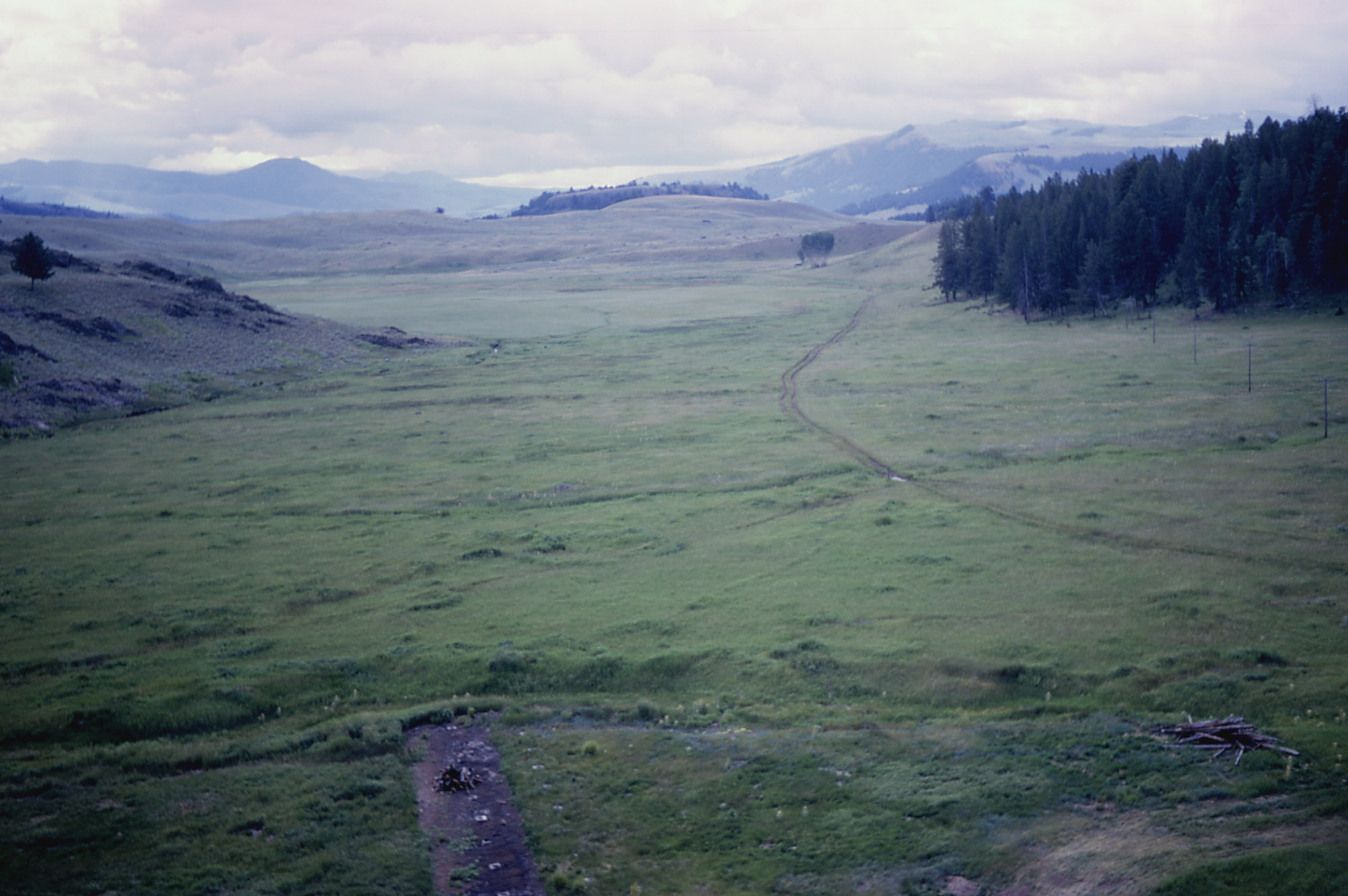
Site of Yancey's Pleasant Valley Hotel, 1965

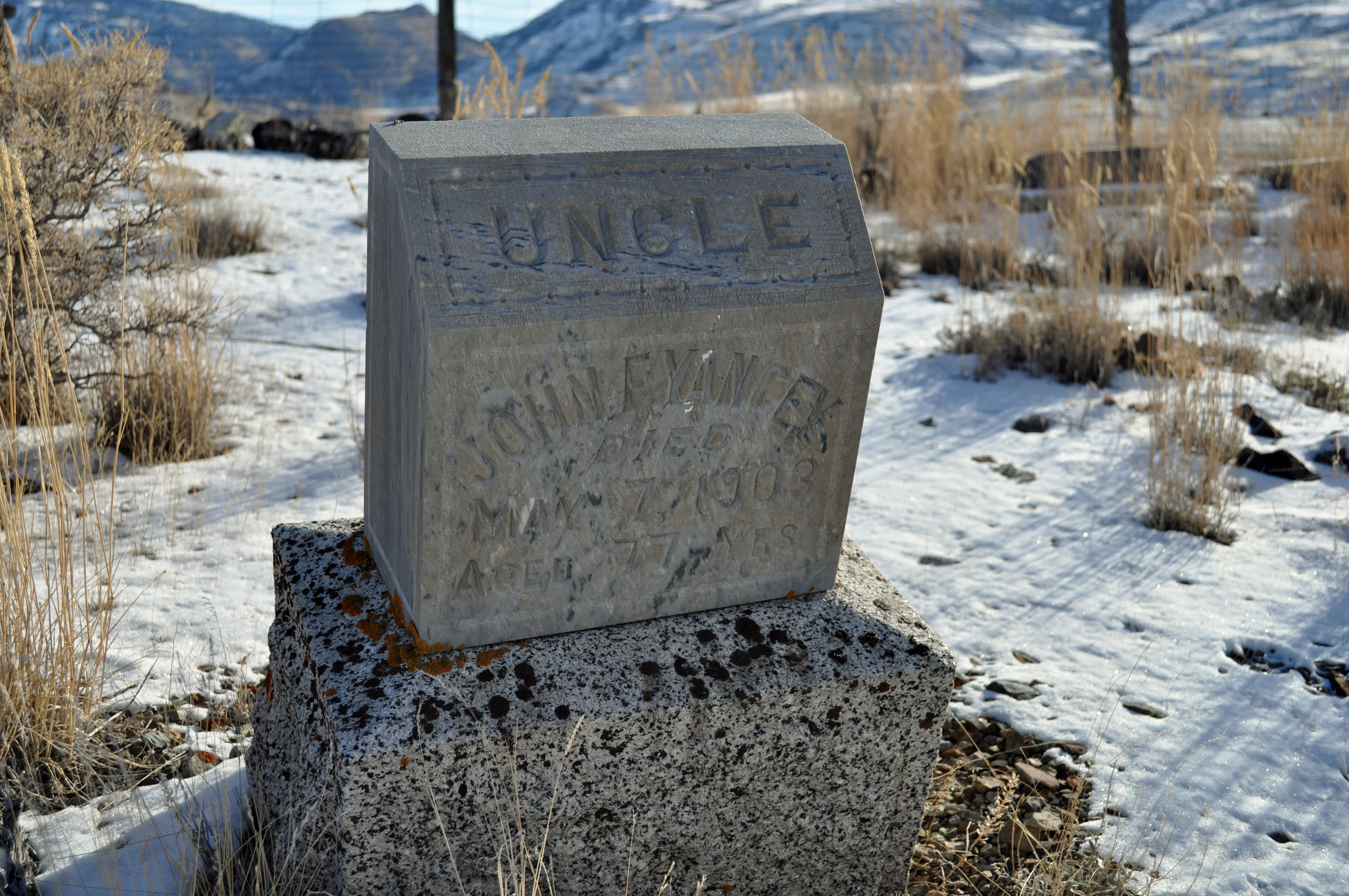
Gravestone, Tinker's Cemetery, Gardiner, MT

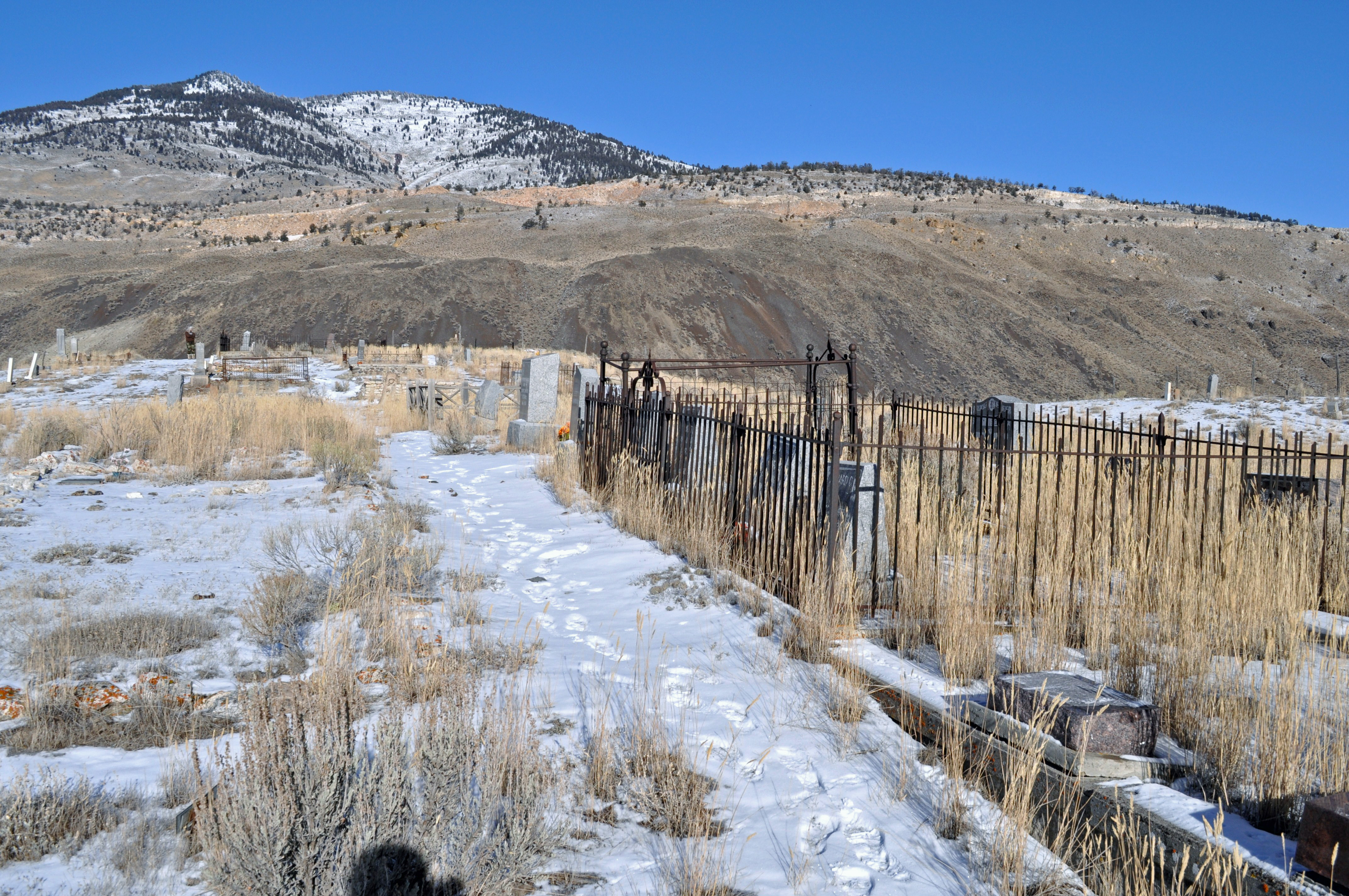
Tinker's Cemetery, Gardiner, MT
