= Hogan Yancey =

American athlete and attorney (1881–1960)

Biographical details
- Born: October 1, 1881; Lexington, Kentucky, U.S.
- Died: March 7, 1960 (aged 78)

Playing career

Football
- 1901–1903: Kentucky University

Baseball
- 1901–1903: Kentucky University
- 1904: Jacksonville Jays
- 1904: Savannah Pathfinders
- 1905–1906: Rochester Bronchos
- 1906: Toronto Maple Leafs
- 1906–1907: Scranton Miners
- 1908: Hartford Senators
- 1909: Birmingham Barons
- 1909: Binghamton Bingoes
- 1910–1911: Lexington Colts

Track and field
- 1902–1903: Kentucky University
- Position: Fullback (football)

Coaching career (HC unless noted)

Football
- 1907–1908: Kentucky University

Administrative career (AD unless noted)
- 1907–1909: Kentucky University

Head coaching record
- Overall: 4–7–3

Accomplishments and honors

Awards
- Football; Second-team All-Southern (1903)

Hogan Lowndes Yancey (October 1, 1881 – March 7, 1960) was an American football and baseball player and attorney. He was a one-time mayor of Lexington, Kentucky. Yancey attended Transylvania University (then Kentucky University). Yancey was a second-team All-Southern fullback on the football team. He played baseball in the minor leagues for several teams.

== Head coaching record ==
Year	Team	Overall	Conference	Standing	Bowl/playoffs
Kentucky University (Independent) (1907–1908)
1907	Kentucky University	3–1–1			
1908	Kentucky University	1–6–2			
Kentucky University:		4–7–3			
Total:		4–7–3			
