= 2007 Carolina Panthers season =

NFL team season

- Owner: Jerry Richardson
- General manager: Marty Hurney
- Head coach: John Fox
- Offensive coordinator: Jeff Davidson
- Defensive coordinator: Mike Trgovac
- Home stadium: Bank of America Stadium

Results
- Record: 7–9
- Division place: 2nd NFC South
- Playoffs: Did not qualify

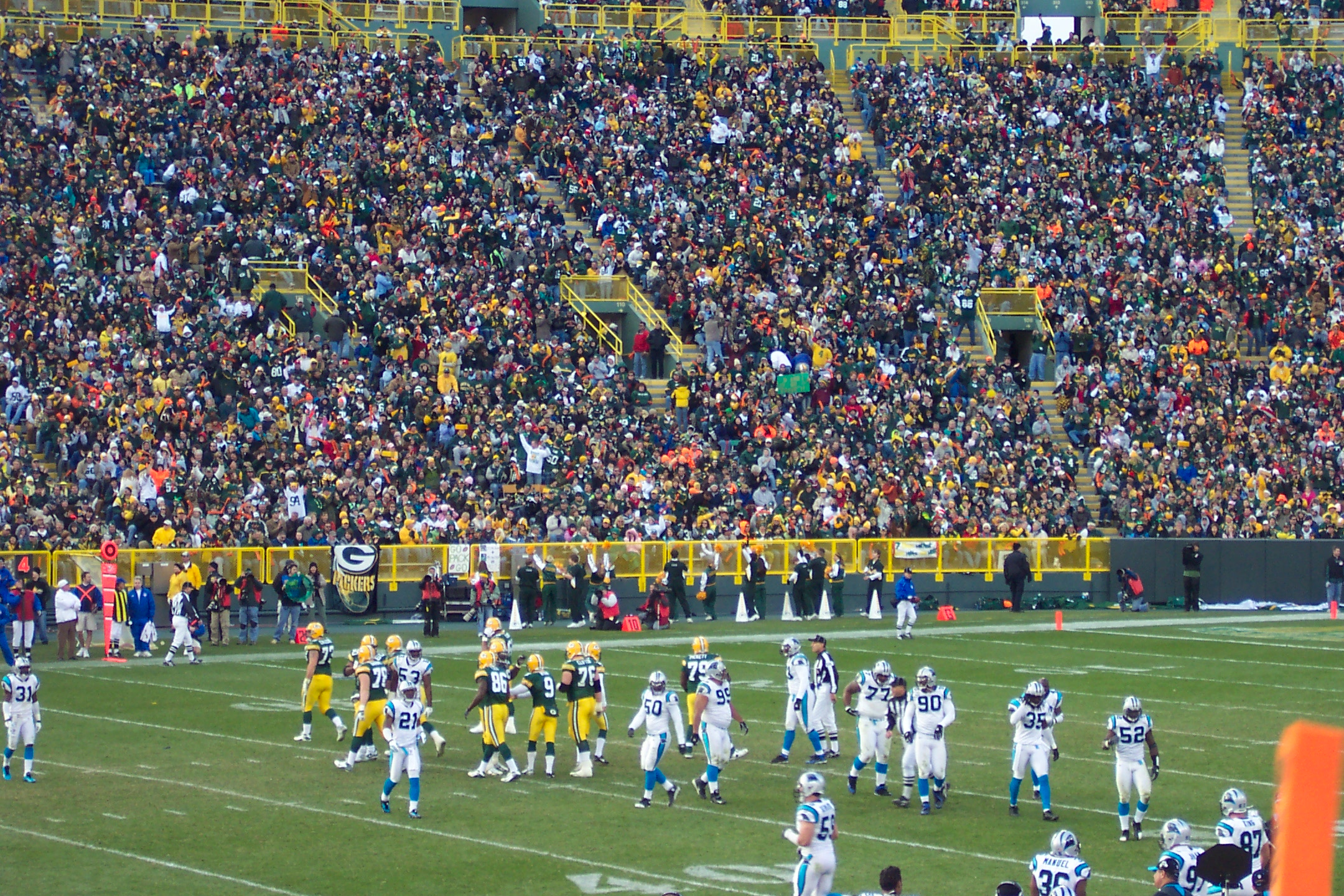
The Panthers defense and Green Bay Packers offense in week 11 of the season

The 2007 Carolina Panthers season was the franchise's 13th season in the National Football League (NFL) and the team's 11th season at Bank of America Stadium. They failed to improve upon their 8–8 record in 2006, finishing at 7–9 and missing the playoffs for the second straight season.

== 2007 NFL draft ==
2007 Carolina Panthers draft
Round	Pick	Player	Position	College	Notes
1	25	Jon Beason *	LB	Miami (FL)	
2	45	Dwayne Jarrett	WR	USC	
2	59	Ryan Kalil *	C	USC	
3	83	Charles Johnson	DE	Georgia	
4	118	Ryne Robinson	WR	Miami (OH)	
5	155	Dante Rosario	TE	Oregon	
5	164	Tim Shaw	LB	Penn State	
7	225	C.J. Wilson	CB	Baylor	
Made roster † Pro Football Hall of Fame * Made at least one Pro Bowl during career

== Staff ==
2007 Carolina Panthers staff
Front office: Owner/founder – Jerry Richardson; President – Mark Richardson; General manager – Marty Hurney; Director of college scouting – Don Gregory; Director of pro scouting – Mark Koncz; Head coaches: Head coach – John Fox; Assistant head coach/running backs – Jim Skipper; Offensive coaches: Offensive coordinator – Jeff Davidson; Passing game coordinator/quarterbacks – Mike McCoy; Wide receivers – Richard Williamson; Offensive line – Dave Magazu; Offensive quality control/tight ends – Geep Chryst	Defensive coaches: Defensive coordinator – Mike Trgovac; Defensive line – Sal Sunseri; Linebackers – Ken Flajole; Defensive Backs (Secondary) – Tim Lewis; Safeties – Mike Gillhamer; Defensive quality control – Sam Mills III; Special teams coaches: Special teams coordinator – Danny Crossman; Special teams assistant/assistant strength and conditioning – Tony Levine; Strength and conditioning: Strength and conditioning – Jerry Simmons

== Roster ==
2007 Carolina Panthers roster
Quarterbacks (QB): 8 David Carr; 3 Matt Moore; 16 Vinny Testaverde; Running backs (RB): 26 DeShaun Foster; 24 Alex Haynes; 45 Brad Hoover FB; 34 DeAngelo Williams KR; Wide receivers (WR): 18 Drew Carter; 11 Jason Carter; 80 Dwayne Jarrett; 10 Ryne Robinson RS; 89 Steve Smith; 19 Travis Taylor; Tight ends (TE): 86 Christian Fauria; 47 Jeff King; 88 Dante Rosario	Offensive linemen (OL): 73 Jeremy Bridges G; 69 Jordan Gross T; 63 Geoff Hangartner C/G; 67 Ryan Kalil C/G; 71 Evan Mathis G; 76 Frank Omiyale T; 68 Mike Wahle G; 70 Travelle Wharton T; Defensive linemen (DL): 91 Gary Gibson DT; 77 Kris Jenkins DT; 95 Charles Johnson DE; 99 Maʻake Kemoeatu DT; 92 Damione Lewis DT; 74 Stanley McClover DE; 94 Kindal Moorehead DT; 93 Mike Rucker DE	Linebackers (LB): 50 James Anderson MLB; 52 Jon Beason; 96 Donté Curry OLB; 58 Thomas Davis OLB; 53 Na'il Diggs OLB; 57 Brandon Jamison OLB; 59 Adam Seward OLB; 97 Tim Shaw MLB; Defensive backs (DB): 35 Deke Cooper FS; 29 Patrick Dendy CB; 20 Chris Gamble CB; 43 Chris Harris S; 21 Ken Lucas CB; 36 Marquand Manuel S; 31 Richard Marshall CB; 26 Quinton Teal SS; 27 C. J. Wilson CB/S; Special teams (ST): 7 Jason Baker P; 4 John Kasay K; 56 Jason Kyle LS; 5 Rhys Lloyd K	Practice squad: 40 DeCori Birmingham RB; 22 Eddie Canonico S; 78 Willie Evans DE; 32 Patrick Ghee S; 82 Marcus Freeman TE; 15 Chris Hannon WR; 42 Billy Latsko FB; 72 Rueben Riley G; Reserve: 14 Brett Basanez QB (IR); 83 Keary Colbert WR (IR); -- Josh Davis WR (NF-Inj.); 17 Jake Delhomme QB (IR); 41 Curtis Deloatch CB (IR); 37 Nick Goings RB (IR); 75 Justin Hartwig C (IR); 54 Terrence Melton LB (IR); 55 Dan Morgan LB (IR); 90 Julius Peppers DE (IR); 25 Nate Salley S (IR); 23 Dante Wesley CB (IR); Rookies in italics 53 active, 12 reserve, 8 practice squad

== Schedule ==
=== Preseason ===
Week	Date	Opponent	Result	Record	Game site	NFL.com recap
1	August 11	at New York Giants	W 24–21	1–0	Giants Stadium	
2	August 17	at Philadelphia Eagles	L 10–27	1–1	Lincoln Financial Field	
3	August 24	New England Patriots	L 7–24	1–2	Bank of America Stadium	
4	August 30	Pittsburgh Steelers	L 3–19	1–3	Bank of America Stadium	

=== Regular season ===
Week	Date	Opponent	Result	Record	Game site	NFL.com recap
1	September 9	at St. Louis Rams	W 27–13	1–0	Edward Jones Dome	Recap
2	September 16	Houston Texans	L 21–34	1–1	Bank of America Stadium	Recap
3	September 23	at Atlanta Falcons	W 27–20	2–1	Georgia Dome	Recap
4	September 30	Tampa Bay Buccaneers	L 7–20	2–2	Bank of America Stadium	Recap
5	October 7	at New Orleans Saints	W 16–13	3–2	Louisiana Superdome	Recap
6	October 14	at Arizona Cardinals	W 25–10	4–2	University of Phoenix Stadium	Recap
7	Bye					
8	October 28	Indianapolis Colts	L 7–31	4–3	Bank of America Stadium	Recap
9	November 4	at Tennessee Titans	L 7–20	4–4	LP Field	Recap
10	November 11	Atlanta Falcons	L 13–20	4–5	Bank of America Stadium	Recap
11	November 18	at Green Bay Packers	L 17–31	4–6	Lambeau Field	Recap
12	November 25	New Orleans Saints	L 6–31	4–7	Bank of America Stadium	Recap
13	December 2	San Francisco 49ers	W 31–14	5–7	Bank of America Stadium	Recap
14	December 9	at Jacksonville Jaguars	L 6–37	5–8	Jacksonville Municipal Stadium	Recap
15	December 16	Seattle Seahawks	W 13–10	6–8	Bank of America Stadium	Recap
16	December 22	Dallas Cowboys	L 13–20	6–9	Bank of America Stadium	Recap
17	December 30	at Tampa Bay Buccaneers	W 31–23	7–9	Raymond James Stadium	Recap

== Standings ==
NFC South
	W	L	T	PCT	DIV	CONF	PF	PA	STK
^{(4)} Tampa Bay Buccaneers	9	7	0	.563	5–1	8–4	334	270	L2
Carolina Panthers	7	9	0	.438	3–3	7–5	267	347	W1
New Orleans Saints	7	9	0	.438	3–3	6–6	379	388	L2
Atlanta Falcons	4	12	0	.250	1–5	3–9	259	414	W1

== Regular season results ==
=== Week 1: at St. Louis Rams ===
Quarter	1	2	3	4	Total
Panthers	7	0	7	13	27
Rams	7	3	3	0	13

at Edward Jones Dome, St. Louis, Missouri

- Game time: 1:00 p.m. EDT
- Game attendance: 65,307
- TV announcers (Fox): Sam Rosen (play-by-play) and Tim Ryan (color commentator)

The Panthers began their 2007 campaign on the road against the St. Louis Rams. In the first quarter, Carolina pounced first with QB Jake Delhomme completing a 10-yard TD pass to WR Drew Carter. Afterwards, the Rams would tie the game with QB Marc Bulger completing a 3-yard TD pass to WR Torry Holt. In the second quarter, St. Louis would lead at halftime on a 42-yard field goal by kicker Jeff Wilkins.

In the third quarter, the Rams increased their lead with Wilkins kicking a 28-yard field goal. Afterwards, the Panthers retook the lead with Delhomme completing a 68-yard TD pass to WR Steve Smith. In the fourth quarter, Carolina took control for the rest of the game with kicker John Kasay nailing a 34-yard field goal, Delhomme & Carter hooking up with each other again on a 9-yard TD pass, and Kasay wrapping up the game with a 32-yard field goal.

With the win, the Panthers began their year at 1–0.

=== Week 2: vs. Houston Texans ===
Quarter	1	2	3	4	Total
Texans	7	10	14	3	34
Panthers	14	0	0	7	21

at Bank of America Stadium, Charlotte, North Carolina

- Game time: 1:00 p.m. EDT
- Game weather: 75 °F (24 °C) (Sunny)
- Game attendance: 73,665
- TV announcers (CBS): Gus Johnson (play-by-play) and Steve Tasker (color commentator)

Coming off their road win over the Rams, the Panthers would play their Week 2 homeopener against the Houston Texans. In the first quarter, Carolina pounced first with QB Jake Delhomme hooking up with WR Steve Smith on a 7-yard TD pass and a 12-yard TD pass. The Texans would respond with QB Matt Schaub completing a 31-yard TD pass to WR Andre Johnson. In the second quarter, Houston continued its pounding with Schaub and Johnson hooking up with each other again on a 9-yard TD pass, along with kicker Kris Brown's 25-yard field goal.

In the third quarter, the Panthers continued to struggle as Texans RB Ahman Green got a 13-yard TD run, while Carolina FB Nick Goings fumbled during a kickoff return. The ball would roll into the endzone, where Houston WR Kevin Walter would land on it for a touchdown. In the fourth quarter, the Texans would put the game well out of reach with Brown's 33-yard field goal. The Panthers tried to get a comeback with Delhomme and Smith hooking up with each other on an amazing 74-yard TD pass, but the deficit was too much to overcome.

With the loss, Carolina fell to 1–1.

=== Week 3: at Atlanta Falcons ===
Quarter	1	2	3	4	Total
Panthers	0	10	14	3	27
Falcons	0	10	7	3	20

- Game time: 4:15 p.m. EDT
- Game attendance: 68,175
- TV announcers (Fox): Ron Pitts (play-by-play) and Tony Boselli (color commentator)

Trying to rebound from their home loss to the Texans, the Panther flew to the Georgia Dome for an NFC South duel with the Atlanta Falcons. After a scoreless first quarter, Carolina scored first in the second quarter with kicker John Kasay hitting a 45-yard field goal. The Falcons took the lead with QB Joey Harrington completing a 69-yard TD pass to WR Roddy White. The Panthers followed up with QB Jake Delhomme completing a 13-yard TD pass to RB DeShaun Foster. Atlanta would end the half with kicker Morten Andersen hitting a 24-yard field goal.

In the third quarter, the Falcons took the lead as Harrington completed a 13-yard TD pass to TE Alge Crumpler. Carolina retook the lead with Delhomme completing a 5-yard TD pass to TE Jeff King, followed by a 10-yard TD run from Foster. In the fourth quarter, the Panthers scored again, with Kasay kicking a 49-yard field goal. The Falcons' Andersen nailed a 25-yard field goal to end the scoring.

The game was noteworthy because of DeAngelo Hall's third quarter meltdown, wherein he was assessed 67 yards of penalties in a single drive. The penalties included a 37-yard pass interference penalty for tackling WR Steve Smith before the ball arrived, a 15-yard personal foul on the following play for blocking Smith at the line, and a 15-yard unsportsmanlike conduct penalty during a verbal exchange with Smith following a third-down sack by John Abraham. The unsportsmanlike conduct penalty gave Carolina a first down, allowing their eventual TD to King rather than the likely 45-yard field goal attempt had the penalty not been called. Following the series, Hall was seen arguing with coaches on the sidelines, leading to a $100,000 fine by the team.

With the win, the Panthers improved to 2–1.

=== Week 4: vs. Tampa Bay Buccaneers ===
Quarter	1	2	3	4	Total
Buccaneers	14	3	0	3	20
Panthers	0	0	0	7	7

at Bank of America Stadium, Charlotte, North Carolina

- Game time: 4:05 p.m. EDT
- Game weather: 79 °F (26 °C) (Sunny)
- Game attendance: 73,707
- TV announcers (Fox): Sam Rosen (play-by-play) and Tim Ryan (color commentator)

Coming off a divisional road win over the Falcons, the Panthers went home, donned their alternate uniforms, and prepared for another NFC South fight, as Carolina dueled with the Tampa Bay Buccaneers with the division lead on the line. With QB Jake Delhomme unable to start with an elbow injury on his throwing arm, QB David Carr was given the start. In the first quarter, the Panthers struggled as Buccaneers QB Jeff Garcia got a 3-yard TD run, while RB Earnest Graham got a 1-yard TD run. In the second quarter, Carolina continued to struggle as kicker Matt Bryant got a 25-yard field goal for the only score of the period.

After a scoreless third quarter, Tampa Bay sealed the win with Bryant nailing a 38-yard field goal. Afterwards, the Panthers would get their only score of the game with Carr completing a 24-yard TD pass to RB DeAngelo Williams.

With their 4th straight home loss, Carolina fell to 2–2.

Scoring summary
Q	Team	Time	Scoring play	Score
1	TB	8:43	Garcia 3-yard TD run (Bryant kick)	TB 7–0
1	TB	0:48	Graham 1-yard TD run (Bryant kick)	TB 14–0
2	TB	6:41	Bryant 25-yard FG	TB 17–0
4	TB	10:21	Bryant 38-yard FG	TB 20–0
4	Car	8:01	24-yard TD pass from Carr to Williams (Kasay kick)	TB 20–7

=== Week 5: at New Orleans Saints ===
Quarter	1	2	3	4	Total
Panthers	3	3	0	10	16
Saints	3	3	7	0	13

at Louisiana Superdome, New Orleans, Louisiana

- Game time: 1:00 p.m. EDT
- Game attendance: 70,001
- TV announcers (Fox): Chris Myers (play-by-play) and Brian Baldinger (color commentator)

Trying to rebound from their divisional home loss to the Buccaneers, the Panthers flew to the Louisiana Superdome for a Week 5 divisional duel with the winless New Orleans Saints. With QB Jake Delhomme out and done for the year with a right elbow injury, QB David Carr was given the start.

In the first quarter, Carolina took the early lead with kicker John Kasay getting a 23-yard field goal. The Saints responded with kicker Olindo Mare getting a 25-yard field goal. In the second quarter, the Panthers went back into the lead with Kasay nailing a 35-yard field goal. New Orleans would respond with Mare kicking a 28-yard field goal.

In the third quarter, Carolina trailed as Saints FB Mike Karney got a 2-yard TD run for the only score of the period. In the fourth quarter, the Panthers tied the game with Carr completing a 17-yard TD pass to WR Steve Smith. Afterwards, Carolina sealed the win in the final seconds with Kasay nailing a 52-yard field goal as time ran out.

With the win, the Panthers improved to 3–2.

=== Week 6: at Arizona Cardinals ===
Quarter	1	2	3	4	Total
Panthers	3	3	3	16	25
Cardinals	0	7	3	0	10

at University of Phoenix, Glendale, Arizona

- Game time: 4:05 p.m. EDT
- Game attendance: 64,403
- TV announcers (Fox): Ron Pitts (play-by-play) and Tony Boselli (color commentator)

Coming off their divisional road win over the Saints, the Panthers flew to the University of Phoenix Stadium for a Week 6 throwdown with the Arizona Cardinals With David Carr recovering from injuries, recently signed QB Vinny Testaverde got the start.

In the first quarter, Carolina pounced first with kicker John Kasay getting a 33-yard field goal for the only score of the period. In the second quarter, the Panthers increased its lead with Kasay kicking a 43-yard field goal. The Cardinals would get on the board with RB Edgerrin James getting a 23-yard TD run. In the third quarter, Carolina responded with Kasay getting a 24-yard field goal, yet Arizona answered with kicker Neil Rackers getting a 50-yard field goal. In the fourth quarter, Testaverde completed a 65-yard TD pass to WR Steve Smith, increasing his consecutive seasons with a touchdown pass record to 21-straight. Afterwards, the Panthers sealed the win with Kasay nailing a 45-yard field goal, while RB DeAngelo Williams got a 13-yard TD run.

With the win, not only did Carolina improve to 4–2 heading into the bye week, but Testaverde became the oldest starting quarterback to win a game (43 years and 335 days), along with the third oldest quarterback to start a game.

=== Week 8: vs. Indianapolis Colts ===
Quarter	1	2	3	4	Total
Colts	3	7	14	7	31
Panthers	7	0	0	0	7

at Bank of America Stadium, Charlotte, North Carolina

- Game time: 1:00 p.m. EST/12:00 p.m. CST
- Game weather: 66 °F (19 °C) (Sunny)
- Game attendance: 74,005
- Referee: Ed Hochuli
- TV announcers (CBS): Jim Nantz and Phil Simms

Game summary Coming off their road win over the Cardinals, the Panthers went home for a Week 8 interconference duel with the defending Super Bowl champions, the Indianapolis Colts. In the first quarter, Carolina struck first by turning their opening drive (which lasted 11 minutes and 1 second) into a 3-yard TD run by RB DeShaun Foster. The Colts would respond with kicker Adam Vinatieri getting a 20-yard field goal. In the second quarter, Indianapolis took the lead with RB Joseph Addai getting a 2-yard TD run for the only score of the period.

In the third quarter, Indianapolis increased its lead with QB Peyton Manning completing a 4-yard TD pass to Addai, along with a 59-yard TD pass to WR Reggie Wayne. In the fourth quarter, the Colts sealed their win with Addai getting a 12-yard TD run.

With the loss, the Panthers fell to 4–3.

Scoring Summary

- Scoring

First quarter

- CAR – DeShaun Foster 3-yard run (Kasay kick), 3:59. Panthers 7–0. Drive: 18 plays, 80 yards, 11:01.
- IND – Adam Vinatieri 20-yard field goal, 0:47. Panthers 7–3. Drive: 6 plays, 18 yards, 2:07.

Second quarter

- IND – Joseph Addai 2-yard run (Vinatieri kick), 1:33. Colts 10–7. Drive: 8 plays, 86 yards, 1:58.

Third quarter

- IND – Joseph Addai 4-yard pass from Peyton Manning (Vinatieri kick), 12:11. Colts 17–7. Drive: 8 plays, 60 yards, 2:49.
- IND – Reggie Wayne 59-yard pass from Peyton Manning (Vinatieri kick), 4:47. Colts 24–7. Drive: 2 plays, 70 yards, 0:46.

Fourth quarter

- IND – Joseph Addai 12-yard run (Vinatieri kick), 13:09. Colts 31–7. Drive: 11 plays, 55 yards, 4:17.

=== Week 9: at Tennessee Titans ===
Quarter	1	2	3	4	Total
Panthers	0	0	0	7	7
Titans	10	3	0	7	20

at LP Field, Nashville, Tennessee

- Game time: 1:00 p.m. EST
- Game attendance: 69,143
- TV announcers (Fox): Dick Stockton (play-by-play) and Brian Baldinger (color commentator)

Hoping to rebound from their home loss to the Colts, the Panthers flew to LP Field for a Week 9 interconference duel with the Tennessee Titans. In the first quarter, Carolina trailed early as Titans QB Vince Young got a 3-yard TD run, while kicker Rob Bironas got a 47-yard field goal. In the second quarter, the Panthers continued to struggle as Bironas nailed a 53-yard field goal for the only score of the period.

After a scoreless third quarter, Tennessee pulled away with RB LenDale White getting a 1-yard TD run. Carolina would avoid a shutout as QB David Carr completed an 18-yard TD pass to WR Drew Carter.

With the loss, the Panthers fell to 4–4.

Carr would relive his Texans days as he got sacked 7 times during the game.

=== Week 10: vs. Atlanta Falcons ===
Quarter	1	2	3	4	Total
Falcons	7	0	3	10	20
Panthers	0	10	0	3	13

at Bank of America Stadium, Charlotte, North Carolina''

- Game time: 1:00 p.m. EST
- Game weather: 55 °F (13 °C) (Partly Cloudy)
- Game attendance: 73,340
- Referee: Terry McAulay
- TV announcers (Fox): Chris Rose (play-by-play) and Terry Donahue (color commentator)

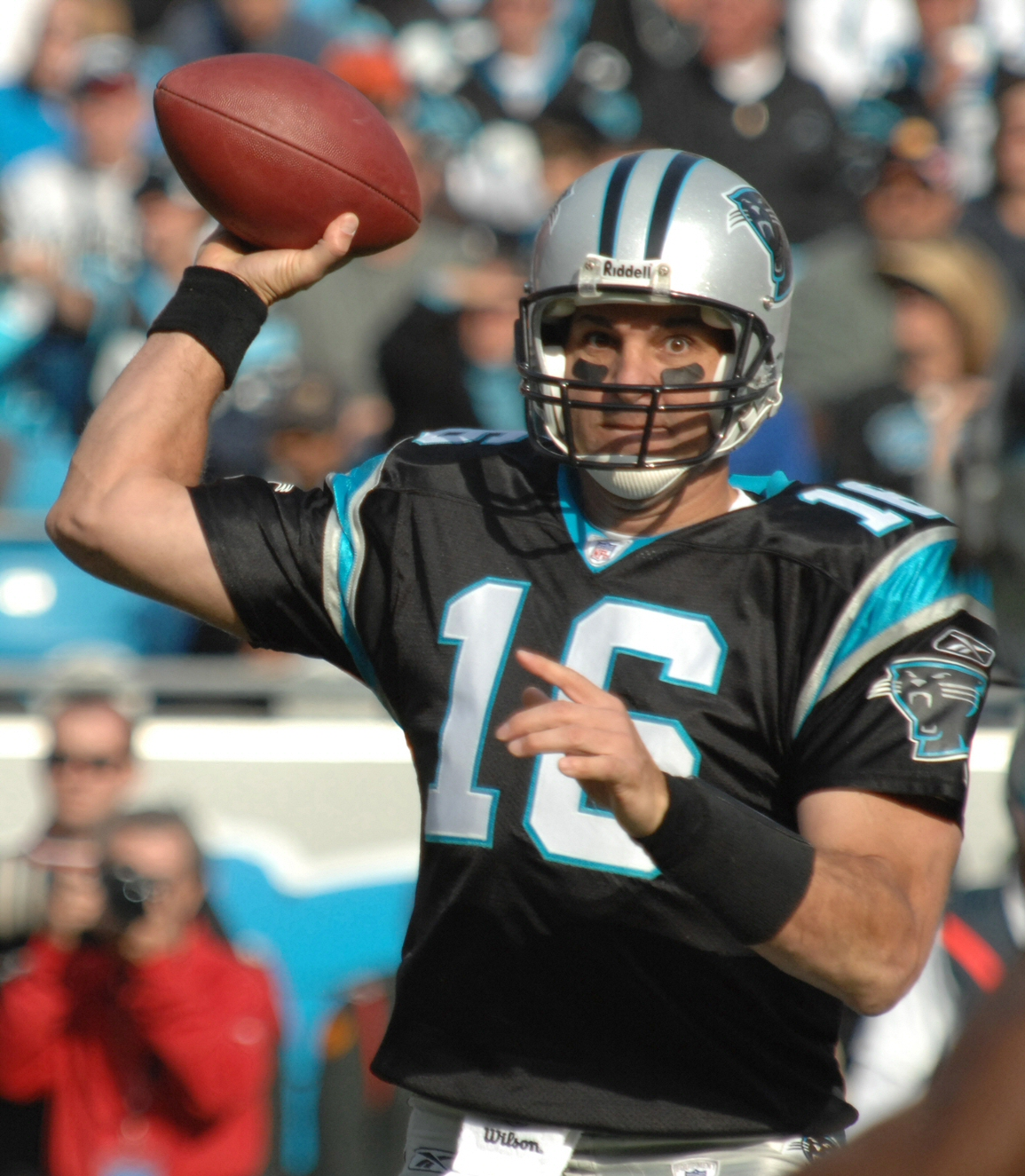
Testaverde in week 10

Trying to snap a two-game losing skid, the Panthers came home for an NFC South rematch with the Atlanta Falcons. Veteran QB Vinny Testaverde would get the start. In the first quarter, Carolina trailed early as Falcons RB Warrick Dunn getting a 30-yard TD run for the only score of the period. In the second quarter, the Panthers took the lead with CB Ken Lucas returning a fumble 27 yards for a touchdown, while kicker John Kasay managed to get a 29-yard field goal.

In the third quarter, Atlanta tied the game with kicker Morten Andersen getting a 36-yard field goal for the only score of the period. In the fourth quarter, the Falcons regained the lead with Andersen kicking a 47-yard field goal. Carolina would reply with Kasay nailing a 31-yard field goal. Unfortunately, Atlanta sealed the win with QB Joey Harrington completing a 30-yard TD pass to TE Alge Crumpler.

With the loss, not only did the Panthers fall to 4–5, but they even lost six-straight home games.

=== Week 11: at Green Bay Packers ===
Quarter	1	2	3	4	Total
Panthers	3	0	7	7	17
Packers	7	14	7	3	31

at Lambeau Field, Green Bay, Wisconsin

- Game time: 1:00 p.m. EST
- Game weather: 42 °F (6 °C) (Sunny)
- Game attendance: 70,805
- Referee: Gene Steratore
- TV announcers (Fox): Dick Stockton (play-by-play) & Brian Baldinger (color commentator)

Trying to snap a three-game losing skid, the Panthers flew to Lambeau Field for Week 11 duel with the Green Bay Packers. This game set a record as QB Vinny Testaverde and Packers QB Brett Favre had the oldest combined age of two starting quarterbacks at 82 years and 44 days.

In the first quarter, Carolina trailed early as Packers CB Tramon Williams returned a pooch punt 94 yards for a touchdown. The Panthers would get on the board as kicker John Kasay managed to get a 26-yard field goal. In the second quarter, Green Bay increased its lead with Favre completing a 4-yard TD pass to WR Greg Jennings and a 26-yard TD pass to TE Donald Lee.

In the third quarter, Green Bay continued its domination as Favre and Lee hooked up with each other again on a 12-yard TD pass. Carolina would respond with Testaverde completing a 2-yard TD pass to TE Christian Fauria. In the fourth quarter, the Panthers tried to come back as Testaverde completed a 5-yard TD pass to WR Drew Carter. However, the Packers sealed the win with kicker Mason Crosby getting a 47-yard field goal.

With their fourth-straight loss, Carolina fell to 4–6.

=== Week 12: vs. New Orleans Saints ===
Quarter	1	2	3	4	Total
Saints	0	10	21	0	31
Panthers	3	3	0	0	6

at Bank of America Stadium, Charlotte, North Carolina

- Game time: 1:00 p.m. EST
- Game weather: 46 °F (8 °C) (Light Rain)
- Game attendance: 72,032
- Referee: Jerome Boger
- TV announcers (FOX): Dick Stockton (play-by-play) & Brian Baldinger (color commentator)

Trying to snap a four-game losing skid, the Panthers went home for a Week 12 NFC South rematch with the New Orleans Saints. In the first quarter, Carolina got the early lead as kicker John Kasay managed to get a 45-yard field goal for the only score of the period. In the second quarter, the Saints took the lead as QB Drew Brees completed a 1-yard TD pass to WR Lance Moore, along with kicker Olindo Mare getting a 46-yard field goal. The Panthers would end the half as Kasay nailed a 29-yard field goal. In the third quarter, New Orleans pulled away with Brees completing a 1-yard TD pass to TE Billy Miller, getting an 8-yard TD run, and completing a 4-yard TD pass to WR Marques Colston.

With their fifth straight loss, not only did Carolina fall to 4–7, but they had also lost seven straight home games (they have yet to win a home game this year). Also, the Panthers offense only managed to get 4 touchdowns in the last five games.

=== Week 13: vs. San Francisco 49ers ===
Quarter	1	2	3	4	Total
49ers	0	0	14	0	14
Panthers	3	14	7	7	31

at Bank of America Stadium, Charlotte, North Carolina

- Game time: 1:00 p.m. EST
- Game weather: 53 °F (12 °C) (Cloudy)
- Game attendance: 73,191
- Referee: Scott Green
- TV announcers (FOX): Matt Vasgersian (play-by-play) & J.C. Pearson (color commentator)

Trying to snap a five-game losing skid, the Panthers stayed at home for a Week 13 intraconference duel with the San Francisco 49ers. In the first quarter, Carolina pounced first with kicker John Kasay nailing a 19-yard field goal for the only score of the period. In the second quarter, the Panthers increased their lead with QB Vinny Testaverde completing a 5-yard TD pass to rookie TE Dante Rosario, while CB Richard Marshall returned an interception 67 yards for a touchdown.

In the third quarter, the 49ers managed to get on the board as QB Trent Dilfer completing a 20-yard TD pass to WR Arnaz Battle and a 1-yard TD pass to TE Delanie Walker. Afterwards, Carolina went back to work as RB DeShaun Foster got a 1-yard TD run. In the fourth quarter, the Panthers pulled away as Testaverde completed a 1-yard TD pass to TE Jeff King.

With the win, not only did Carolina improve to 5–7, but it even managed to give the Panthers their first home win of the year. It took 54 weeks overall for the Panthers to win a home game; they continued the home losing streak that lasted throughout the rest of the 2006 season and extended it to 7 games, but they ended the streak by winning 31-14 against San Francisco at the BOA in Week 13.

=== Week 14: at Jacksonville Jaguars ===
Quarter	1	2	3	4	Total
Panthers	0	6	0	0	6
Jaguars	7	3	10	17	37

at Jacksonville Municipal Stadium, Jacksonville, Florida

- Game time: 1:00 p.m. EST
- Game weather: 77 °F (25 °C) (Sunny)
- Game attendance: 66,090
- Referee: John Parry
- TV announcers (FOX): Ron Pitts (play-by-play) & Tony Boselli (color commentator)

Coming off their home win over the 49ers, the Panthers flew to Jacksonville Municipal Stadium for a Week 14 interconference duel with their 1995 expansion rival, the Jacksonville Jaguars. In the first quarter, Carolina trailed early as Jaguars QB David Garrard completed a 22-yard TD pass to WR Reggie Williams for the only score of the period. In the second quarter, the Panthers would get on the board as kicker John Kasay managed to get a 49-yard field goal. Afterwards, Jacksonville responded with kicker Josh Scobee getting a 21-yard field goal. Carolina would end the half as Kasay kicked a 21-yard field goal.

In the third quarter, the Panthers began to fall behind as Garrard completed a 6-yard TD pass to WR Matt Jones, along with Scobee kicking a 20-yard field goal. In the fourth quarter, the Jaguars sealed the win with LB Clint Ingram returning an interception 39 yards for a touchdown, RB Fred Taylor getting an 80-yard TD run, and Scobee nailing a 33-yard field goal.

With the loss, Carolina fell to 5–8.

=== Week 15: vs. Seattle Seahawks ===
Quarter	1	2	3	4	Total
Seahawks	0	0	0	10	10
Panthers	0	0	0	13	13

at Bank of America Stadium, Charlotte, North Carolina

- Game time: 1:00 PM EDT/10:00 AM PDT
- Game weather: 48 °F (9 °C) (Sunny)
- Referee: Walt Anderson
- TV announcers (Fox): Dick Stockton (play-by-play) & Brian Baldinger (color commentator)

Hoping to rebound from their road loss to the Jaguars, the Panthers went home for a Week 15 intraconference duel with the Seattle Seahawks. The game remained scoreless for the first three quarters of play until kicker John Kasay finally delivered the game's first punch in the fourth quarter with a 53-yard field goal. Afterwards, the Seahawks would respond with kicker Josh Brown getting a 23-yard field goal. After that, Carolina clawed deep with Kasay nailing a 37-yard field goal and RB DeAngelo Williams getting a 35-yard touchdown run. Later, Seattle's only response would be QB Matt Hasselbeck completing a 15-yard TD pass to WR Deion Branch.

With the win, the Panthers kept their slim playoffs alive by improving to 6–8.

=== Week 16: vs. Dallas Cowboys ===
Quarter	1	2	3	4	Total
Cowboys	7	10	0	3	20
Panthers	0	7	3	3	13

at Bank of America Stadium, Charlotte, North Carolina

- Game time: 8:15 PM EDT
- Game weather: 48 °F (9 °C) (Cloudy)
- Game attendance: 73,860
- Referee: Mike Carey
- TV announcers (NFL Network): Bryant Gumbel (play-by-play) and Cris Collinsworth (color commentator)

Coming off their win over the Seahawks, the Panthers stayed at home for a Week 16 Saturday night duel with the playoff-bound Dallas Cowboys in an attempt to keep their slim playoff hopes alive.

In the first quarter, Carolina trailed early as Cowboys QB Tony Romo completed a 10-yard TD pass to WR Terrell Owens for the only score of the period. In the second quarter, Dallas increased its lead with RB Marion Barber getting a 5-yard TD run. The Panthers got on the board with Matt Moore completing an 11-yard TD pass to WR Steve Smith. The Cowboys ended the half with kicker Nick Folk getting a 42-yard field goal.

In the third quarter, Carolina began rallying with John Kasay getting a 37-yard field goal for the only score of the period. In the fourth quarter, Dallas responded with Folk kicking a 23-yard field goal. The Panthers tried to come back as Kasay nailed a 25-yard field goal, but the Cowboys' defense held on for the win.

With the loss, they fell to 6-9 and were eliminated from playoff contention.

=== Week 17: at Tampa Bay Buccaneers ===
Quarter	1	2	3	4	Total
Panthers	7	10	7	7	31
Buccaneers	7	6	7	3	23

at Raymond James Stadium, Tampa, Florida

- Game time: 1:00 PM EDT
- Game weather: 80 °F (27 °C), Mostly Cloudy
- Game attendance: 65,609
- Referee: Gene Steratore
- TV announcers (FOX): Ron Pitts (play-by-play), Tony Boselli (color commentary), and Chip Carter (sideline reporter)

Carolina concluded the regular season at home against the Buccaneers. With a playoff spot now gone and nothing to lose, the Panthers took the field with Matt Moore at the helm.

Tampa Bay struck first as second-string QB Luke McCown, in place of starter Jeff Garcia, drove the Buccaneers down the field for the game's first score, a touchdown pass to TE Jerramy Stevens. The Panthers responded by driving to the Tampa Bay 4-yard line. A field goal kick by John Kasay was good, but a holding penalty by LB Derrick Brooks gave the Panthers a first down. They capitalized on this opportunity with a 2-yard touchdown pass from Moore to TE Christian Fauria, tying the game at 7.

In the second quarter, a Matt Moore interception by Phillip Buchanon led to a Matt Bryant field goal. The Panthers responded once again with a 20-yard touchdown pass to TE Dante Rosario, giving Carolina a 14–10 lead with 6:40 left in the half. Late in the second quarter, Josh Bidwell punted to Carolina, but a fumble by Ryne Robinson on the return was recovered by the Buccaneers. Tampa Bay tacked on another Bryant field goal with 2:34 left in the half, but Carolina responded with a field goal of their own with 16 seconds remaining until the break, giving them a 17–13 lead at the half.

Midway through the third quarter, Carolina punted and pinned the Buccaneers on their own 2-yard line. McCown then led the Buccaneers on a 10-play, 98-yard touchdown drive, the longest such scoring drive in franchise history, resulting in a 23-yard touchdown pass to RB Michael Bennett and a 20–17 lead. Carolina kept themselves in the game, however, quickly following up a 46-yard reception to Drew Carter with a 1-yard touchdown run by RB DeAngelo Williams, making the score 24–20 in favor of the Panthers.

Going into the fourth quarter, the Bucs added another field goal from Bryant with 14:02 left in the game and the score 24–23. The Panthers capped their scoring with a 32-yard touchdown run from Williams, his second of the day, making it 31–23. Trailing late in the fourth quarter, McCown drove the Buccaneers to the Carolina 36-yard line, but was intercepted by DB Richard Marshall. As a sign of respect for his last official game, the Panthers let veteran QB Vinny Testaverde kneel down the ball on the game's last play. The Panthers finished the season with a record of 7–9.
