= Nick Goings =

American football player (born 1978)

Nicholas Aaron Goings
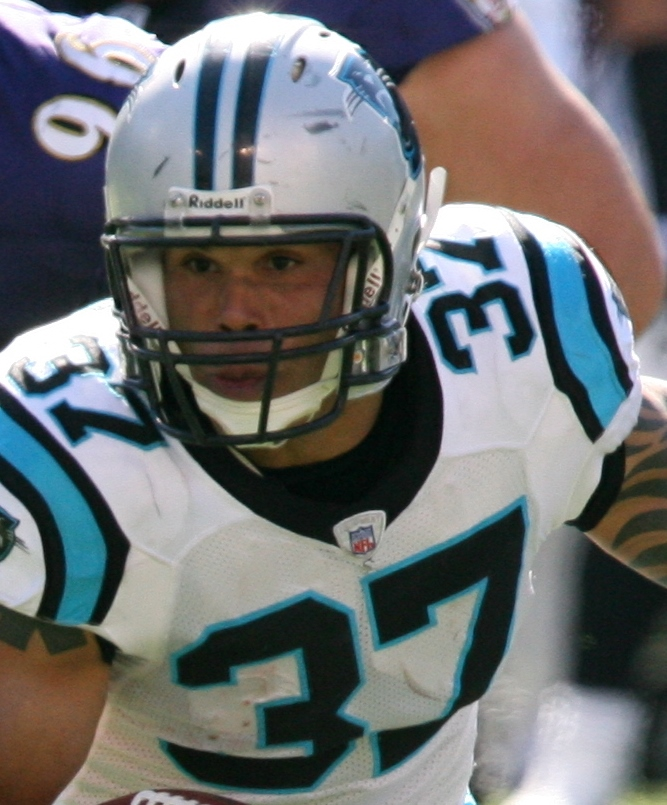
- Goings in 2006

No. 36, 37
- Position: Running back

Personal information
- Born: January 26, 1978 (age 48); Columbus, Ohio, U.S.
- Listed height: 5 ft 11 in (1.80 m)
- Listed weight: 215 lb (98 kg)

Career information
- High school: Dublin Scioto (Dublin, Ohio)
- College: Ohio State (1996–1997); Pitt (1999–2000)
- NFL draft: 2001: undrafted

Career history
- Carolina Panthers (2001–2008)

Career NFL statistics
- Rushing attempts: 400
- Rushing yards: 1,470
- Rushing touchdowns: 6
- Receptions: 110
- Receiving yards: 880
- Receiving touchdowns: 3
- Stats at Pro Football Reference

Nicholas Aaron Goings (born January 26, 1978) is an American former professional football player who was a running back for the Carolina Panthers of the National Football League (NFL). He played his college football for the Ohio State Buckeyes and Pitt Panthers before signing with the Panthers as an undrafted free agent in 2001.

== Early life ==
Goings graduated from Dublin Scioto High School in Dublin, Ohio. Nick finished his prep career with 5,785 yards rushing and 82 touchdowns. Nick was a 2 time First-team All-Ohio selection. During his Senior year he was a Blue Chip Illustrated Pre-Season All-American and led Dublin Scioto High School to their first ever State Championship in 1995, while rushing for 2589 yards and scoring 38 touchdowns. Following his Senior year Nick was awarded the Ohio High School Athletic Association Division 2 Player of The Year. He was named the Columbus Dispatch-Agonis Club Offensive Player of The Year and Scoring Leader in 1995. Nick went on to become M.V.P. of Ohio's North vs South All-Star game as well as M.V.P. of the Big 33, the Ohio vs Pennsylvania All-Star game, setting the record for most rushing yards in the game (176) along with 3 Touchdowns (including and 88-yard touchdown run). Nick has recently been awarded a spot on the 1st team All-Time “ThisWeek” Publications Football Team (top players from Central Ohio since 1990).

== College career ==
Goings was highly recruited Running Back coming out of High School in 1996. Nick accepted a scholarship from Ohio State University as a member of the #1 recruiting class in the nation. In his first collegiate action as a true freshman (vs Pitt), Nick rushed for 56 yards on 12 carries and added 1 reception for 15 yards before suffering a season ending neck injury. Following his redshirt freshman year, he transferred to the University of Pittsburgh, and he was forced to sit out due to NCAA rules. His productivity increased with the Panthers, and finished his collegiate career with 1,185 all-purpose yards and 8 touchdowns. Goings graduated from the University of Pittsburgh with a bachelor's degree in social sciences.

== Professional career ==
=== Carolina Panthers ===
Goings signed with the Carolina Panthers as the only undrafted free agent to make the team in 2001. He utilized his versatility as a third down back and core special teams player during his career. In 2003 his role began to expand with the change in offense once Jake Delhomme took over as quarterback. He scored his first NFL touchdown against the Tennessee Titans on an eight-yard reception from Delhomme. During the 2004 NFL season, Goings went from fourth on the depth chart to starter, once Stephen Davis, DeShaun Foster, and Rod Smart all went down with injuries. Goings started the last 7 games of the season and led the team in rushing with 821 yards and scored 7 touchdowns. His 121-yard, 3 touchdown performance against the Arizona Cardinals earned him NFC Offensive Player of the Week honors. On Dec 5, he logged 122 yards and 1 touchdown on what remains a franchise-record 36 carries. Goings finished the 2004 season with 1,215 all-purpose yards.

During the 7-game stint he also led the NFL with five 100-yard rushing games, and tied Davis' team record with four consecutive 100-yard games. Following the 2004 season Goings was selected to Daryl Johnston's "All Lunch Pail Crew". The next season, he moved up to the third slot on the depth chart, and thanks to his impressive 2004 season, he was used much more often in game situations and was voted a special teams Captain in 2007.

On October 24, 2007, Goings was placed on injured reserve by the Carolina Panthers after sustaining the fourth concussion of his career and suffering from the effects of post-concussion syndrome. Prior to being placed on injured reserve, Goings had played in 4 games. Goings was released by the Panthers on February 25, 2009.

Nick finished his Panthers career with 2,763 all-purpose yards, 9 touchdowns, and 53 special teams tackles.

== NFL career statistics ==
Legend
**Bold**	Career high

=== Regular season ===
Year	Team	Games		Rushing					Receiving				
Year	Team	GP	GS	Att	Yds	Avg	Lng	TD	Rec	Yds	Avg	Lng	TD
2001	CAR	13	2	66	197	3.0	16	0	8	39	4.9	11	0
2002	CAR	14	2	50	188	3.8	20	0	18	91	5.1	14	0
2003	CAR	15	0	10	69	**6.9**	17	0	12	97	8.1	14	**1**
2004	CAR	**16**	**8**	**217**	**821**	3.8	**57**	**6**	**45**	**394**	8.8	**37**	**1**
2005	CAR	**16**	1	37	133	3.6	17	0	14	151	**10.8**	30	0
2006	CAR	11	0	11	52	4.7	28	0	10	107	10.7	23	**1**
2007	CAR	4	0	0	0	0.0	0	0	0	0	0	0	0
2008	CAR	**16**	0	9	10	1.1	4	0	3	1	0.3	3	0
		105	13	400	1,470	3.7	57	6	110	880	8.0	37	3

=== Playoffs ===
Year	Team	Games		Rushing					Receiving				
Year	Team	GP	GS	Att	Yds	Avg	Lng	TD	Rec	Yds	Avg	Lng	TD
2003	CAR	**4**	0	6	22	**3.7**	9	0	**2**	15	7.5	12	0
2005	CAR	3	**1**	**27**	**99**	**3.7**	**18**	0	**2**	**24**	**12.0**	**14**	0
2008	CAR	1	0	0	0	0.0	0	0	0	0	0.0	0	0
		8	1	33	121	3.7	18	0	4	39	9.8	14	0
