= James Anderson (American football) =

American football player (born 1983)

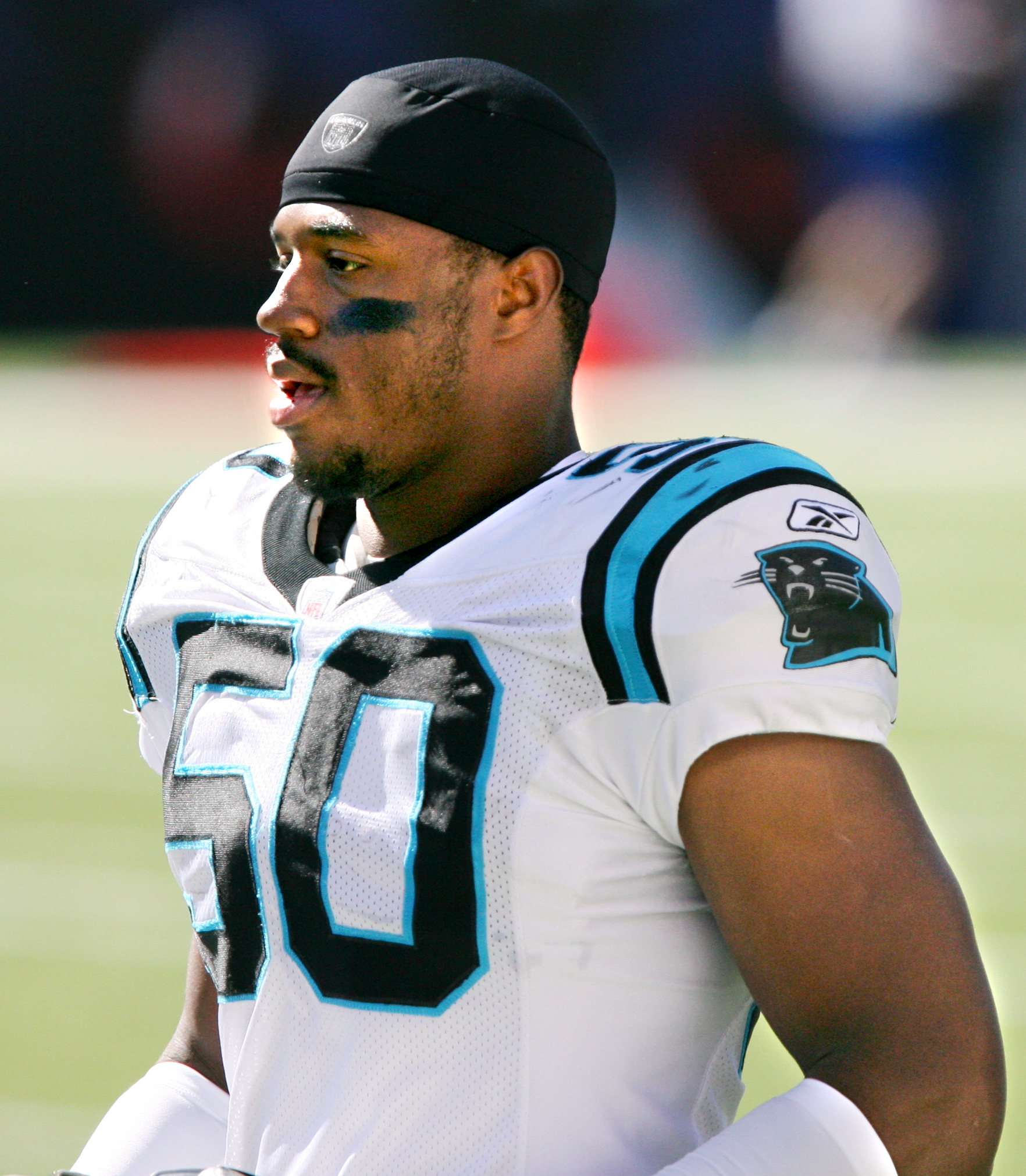
- Anderson with the Carolina Panthers in 2006

No. 50, 57, 42
- Position: Linebacker

Personal information
- Born: September 26, 1983 (age 43); Roanoke Rapids, North Carolina, U.S.
- Listed height: 6 ft 2 in (1.88 m)
- Listed weight: 235 lb (107 kg)

Career information
- High school: Chesapeake (VA) Deep Creek
- College: Virginia Tech
- NFL draft: 2006: 3rd round, 88th overall pick

Career history
- Carolina Panthers (2006–2012); Chicago Bears (2013); New England Patriots (2014)*; Tennessee Titans (2014); Atlanta Falcons (2014); Dallas Cowboys (2014); New Orleans Saints (2015)
- * Offseason or practice squad member only

Career NFL statistics
- Total tackles: 577
- Sacks: 12.0
- Forced fumbles: 5
- Fumble recoveries: 8
- Interceptions: 3
- Stats at Pro Football Reference

James Nathaniel Anderson (born September 26, 1983) is an American former professional football player who was a linebacker in the National Football League (NFL). He played college football for the Virginia Tech Hokies and was selected in the third round (88th overall) of the 2006 NFL draft by the Carolina Panthers.

== Early life ==
Anderson was a high school and college football teammate of DeAngelo Hall and Darryl Tapp at Deep Creek High School and Virginia Tech.

== College career ==
Anderson redshirted in 2001 at Virginia Tech, performing on the scout team. He played in every game in 2002, earning three starts and posting 47 tackles (28 solos) with a half sack, three stops for losses and a forced fumble. He spent the bulk of the 2003 season playing on special teams, as only four of his 41 tackles (29 solos) came during defensive action.

Anderson started 12 games at weak-side linebacker in 2004, performing in 117 special teams and 368 defensive snaps. He ranked seventh on the squad with 48 tackles (21 solos) and had 2.5 sacks with 6.5 stops behind the line of scrimmage. He also recovered two fumbles and intercepted a pass.

He started every game as a senior, ranking second on the Tech team with a career-high 82 tackles (41 solos). Anderson registered three sacks and tied for third on the team with 8.5 stops for losses. He caused and recovered a fumble, batted away three passes and had two interceptions, returning one for a touchdown.

In 53 games with the Hokies, Anderson started 28 times. He collected 218 tackles (119 solos) with seven sacks for minus-26 yards and 18 stops for losses of 75 yards. He was credited with six quarterback pressures, three fumble recoveries and two forced fumbles. Anderson also gained 53 yards with a touchdown on three interception returns and deflected five passes.

== Professional career ==
Pre-draft measurables
Height	Weight	Arm length	Hand span	40-yard dash	10-yard split	20-yard split	20-yard shuttle	Three-cone drill	Vertical jump	Broad jump
6 ft 2 3/4 in (1.90 m)	229 lb (104 kg)	32 in (0.81 m)	9 3/4 in (0.25 m)	4.64 s	1.57 s	2.67 s	4.07 s	6.67 s	41.0 in (1.04 m)	10 ft 1 in (3.07 m)
All values from NFL Combine

=== Carolina Panthers ===
The Carolina Panthers selected Anderson in the third round (88th overall) of the 2006 NFL draft. The Panthers obtained the selection as compensation for failing to re-sign cornerback Ricky Manning as a Restricted free agent.

In his debut season, he appeared in 16 games and recorded 25 tackles. He made his first career start at the Cincinnati Bengals on October 22. In the 2007 season, he played in ten games and recorded 11 tackles.

In 2011, Anderson was re-signed by the Panthers with a 5-year deal worth 22 million dollars and 8.5 million guaranteed. In 2012 against the New York Giants, Anderson recorded a franchise record 20 tackles in a single game. He was later released in March 2013 to save salary cap room. Anderson ended his tenure with 94 appearances, the most by a linebacker in Panthers history at the time of his release.

=== Chicago Bears ===
On March 24, 2013, Anderson signed a contract with the Chicago Bears, and wore number 50, becoming the first Bears player to wear the number since Mike Singletary retired in 1992. Anderson ended the 2013 season leading the Bears in tackles with 102, and tied for the team lead with 10 tackles for loss.

=== New England Patriots ===
Anderson signed with the New England Patriots on June 4, 2014. The Patriots released Anderson on August 24, 2014.

=== Tennessee Titans ===
Anderson signed with the Tennessee Titans on September 16, 2014, replacing an injured Zach Brown.

=== Atlanta Falcons ===
Signed with the Atlanta Falcons on November 20, 2014. He was released on December 24, 2014.

=== Dallas Cowboys ===
On December 30, 2014, Anderson signed with the Dallas Cowboys.

=== New Orleans Saints ===
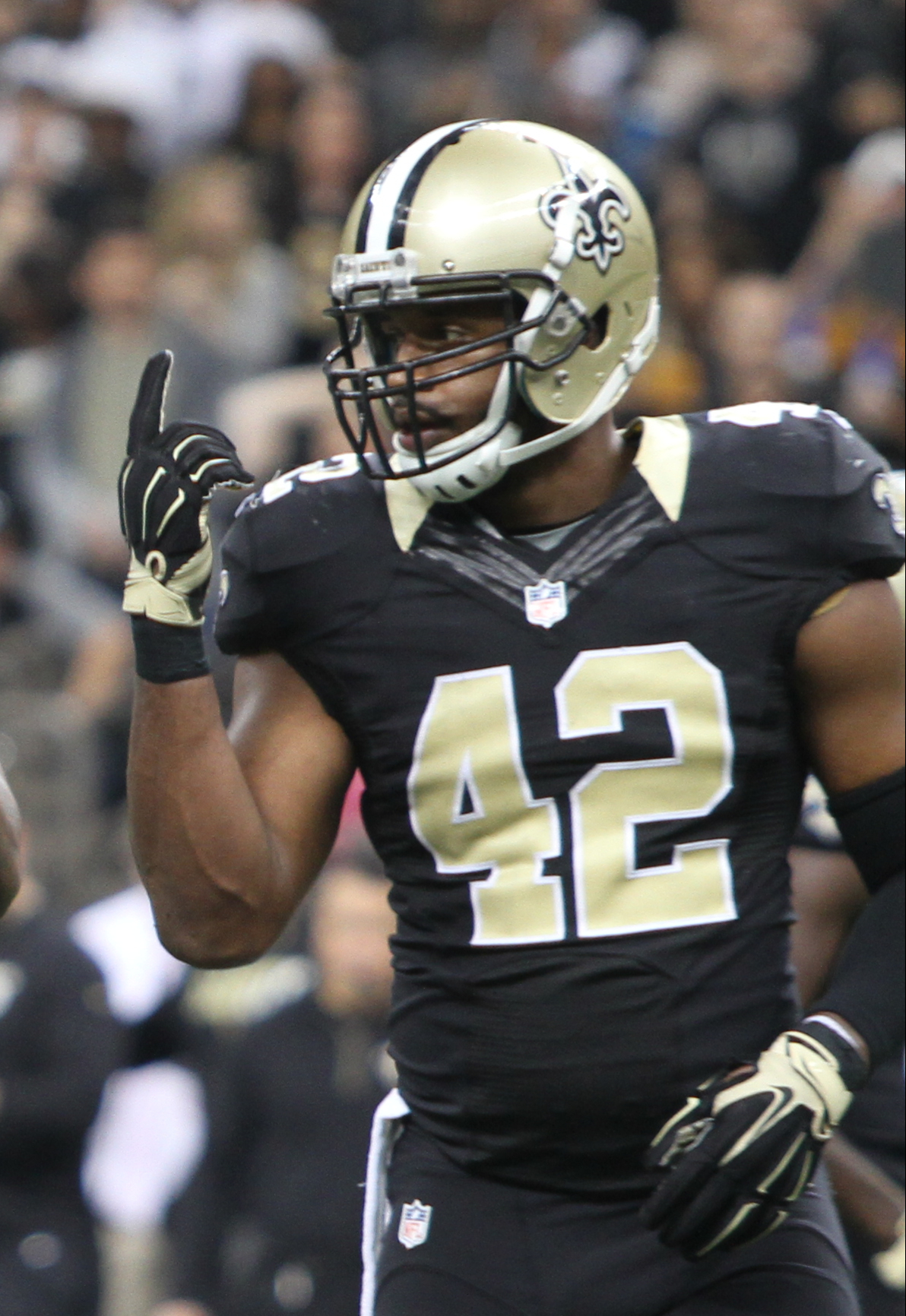
Anderson playing for the Saints in 2015.

On November 10, 2015, Anderson signed with the New Orleans Saints.

=== NFL statistics ===
Year	Team	GP	COMB	TOTAL	AST	SACK	FF	FR	FR YDS	INT	IR YDS	AVG IR	LNG	TD	PD
2006	CAR	16	21	18	3	2.0	2	0	0	0	0	0	0	0	2
2007	CAR	10	17	14	3	0.0	0	0	0	0	0	0	0	0	0
2008	CAR	8	3	3	0	0.0	0	0	0	0	0	0	0	0	0
2009	CAR	16	65	47	18	1.0	1	1	3	0	0	0	0	0	1
2010	CAR	16	130	101	29	3.5	2	3	2	1	1	1	1	0	5
2011	CAR	16	145	98	47	1.5	0	3	0	2	5	3	5	0	9
2012	CAR	12	73	39	34	0.0	0	0	0	0	0	0	0	0	2
2013	CHI	16	102	85	17	4.0	0	1	0	0	0	0	0	0	3
2014	TEN	7	5	4	1	0.0	0	0	0	0	0	0	0	0	0
2015	NO	6	16	11	5	0.0	0	0	0	0	0	0	0	0	0
Career		123	577	420	157	12.0	5	8	5	3	6	2	5	0	22

== Personal life ==
Anderson's nephew is NFL quarterback Malik Willis.

Anderson appeared on the ABC Network miniature golf reality show, Holey Moley in August 2020. He set a record for longest time on the mechanical gopher. After winning in the first round, he was defeated by the Cookie Lady on "Putt the Plank" when his tee shot landed in the sand trap.

Anderson pursued his love for golf, and started competing on the Professional Long Drive Association tour. Anderson won the Men's over 40 Amateur 2023 Ultimate Long Drive™ World Championship.
