= Na'il Diggs =

American football player (born 1978)

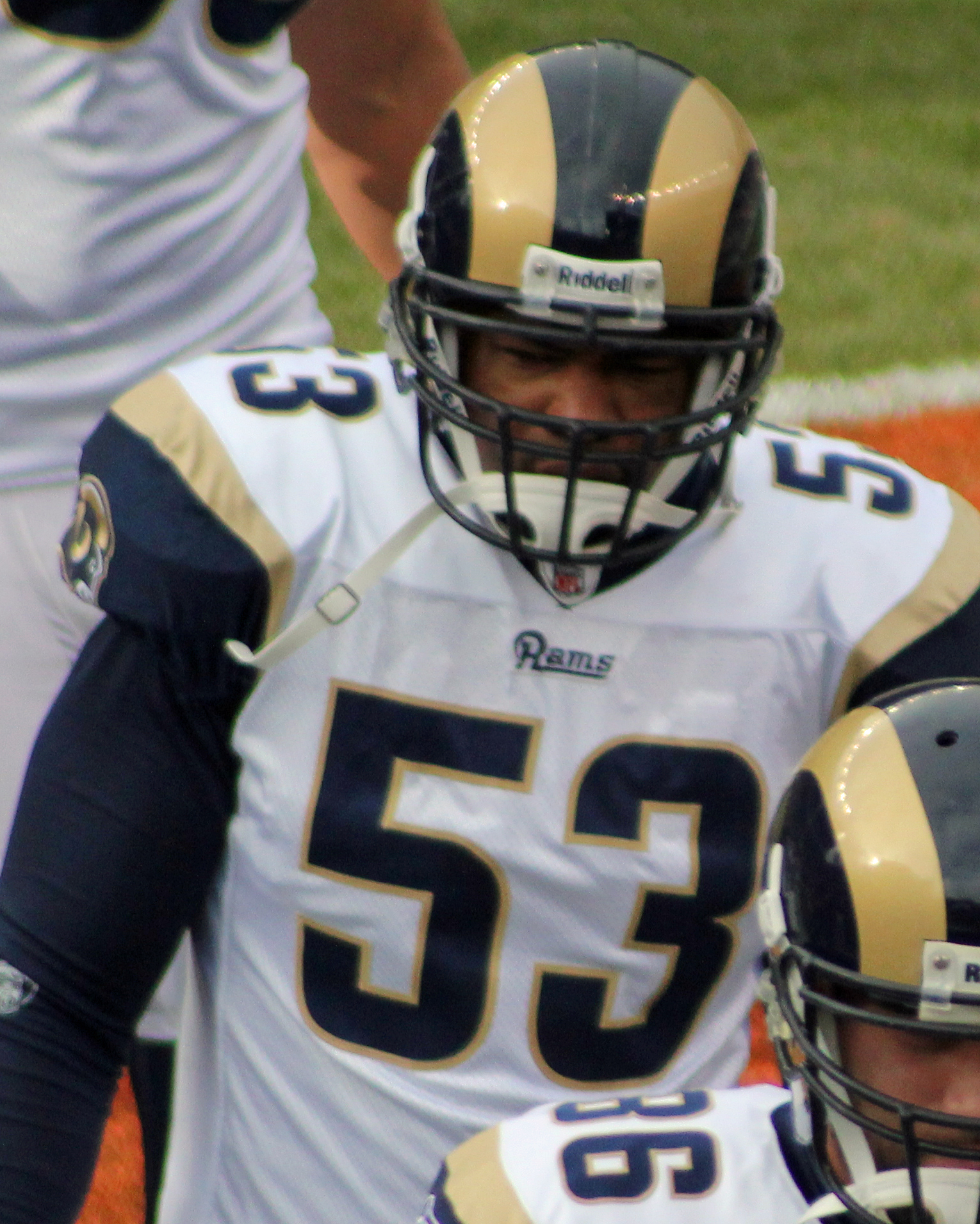
- Diggs with the St. Louis Rams in 2010

No. 59, 53, 58
- Position: Linebacker

Personal information
- Born: July 8, 1978 (age 48); Phoenix, Arizona, U.S.
- Listed height: 6 ft 4 in (1.93 m)
- Listed weight: 240 lb (109 kg)

Career information
- High school: Susan Miller Dorsey (Los Angeles, California)
- College: Ohio State
- NFL draft: 2000: 4th round, 98th overall pick

Career history
- Green Bay Packers (2000–2005); Carolina Panthers (2006–2009); St. Louis Rams (2010); San Diego Chargers (2011)

Awards and highlights
- Third-team All-American (1999); First-team All-Big Ten (1998); Second-team All-Big Ten (1999)

Career NFL statistics
- Total tackles: 679
- Sacks: 11.5
- Forced fumbles: 4
- Fumble recoveries: 6
- Interceptions: 5
- Stats at Pro Football Reference

Na'il Ronald Diggs (born July 8, 1978) is an American former professional football player who was a linebacker in the National Football League (NFL). He was selected by the Green Bay Packers in the fourth round of the 2000 NFL draft. He played college football for the Ohio State Buckeyes and in the NFL for the Carolina Panthers, St. Louis Rams, and San Diego Chargers.

== College career ==
Diggs played college football at Ohio State University in Columbus. For his last two years at OSU he played strongside linebacker after starting as a defensive end as a freshman. As a senior, Diggs led the Buckeyes with 94 tackles, 15 tackles for losses and 6 sacks. He played in 37 games recording 202 tackles, 18 sacks, four forced fumbles, three fumble recoveries and one interception. He graduated with a degree in aviation.

== Professional career ==
=== Pre-draft ===
Diggs measured 6'3½" and 231 pounds and had a 40-yard dash time of 4.55 seconds.

=== Green Bay Packers ===
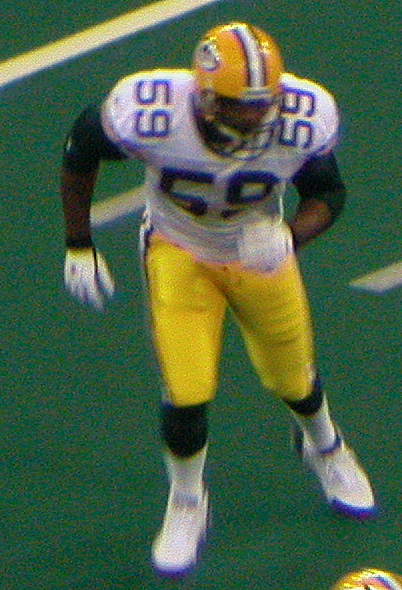
Diggs playing for the Green Bay Packers in 2004.

Diggs was selected by the Green Bay Packers in the fourth round of the 2000 NFL draft. On June 20, 2000, Diggs signed a three-year $1.2 million contract that included a $300,000 signing bonus. On September 11, 2000, Diggs was named Sports Illustrated's Special Teams Player of the Week by Peter King. Diggs played in 13 games with 12 starts at strongside linebacker and was named All-Rookie by the PFWA after posting 54 tackles, one fumble recovery and four passes defensed. In 2001, he started all 16 games at strongside linebacker and produced 92 tackles, 2.0 sacks, and six passes defensed. In 2002 Diggs again started all 16 games at strongside linebacker and finished second on the team with 111 tackles, 3.0 sacks, one forced fumble, two fumble recoveries, two interceptions and seven passes defensed. Diggs was named NFC Defensive Player of the Month for December 2002, after making 37 tackles, one forced fumble, one fumble recovery, one interception and two passes defensed in five games.

In the 2003 off-season Diggs signed a four-year, $10.5 million contract after the Packers matched an offer sheet for the same amount from the Detroit Lions. In 2003 Diggs moved to weakside linebacker from and started all 16 games and had 123 tackles, 1.0 sack, one forced fumble, two interceptions and eight passes defensed. An injury kept Diggs out of the final two games in 2004, snapping his consecutive games started streak at 74. Diggs did start 14 games at weakside linebacker had 116 tackles, 1.0 sack, two passes defensed and one blocked kick. In 2005 Diggs returned to strongside linebacker and appeared in nine games with six starts. Before he was injured he recorded 45 tackles, and one fumble recovery. On March 2, 2006, he was released by the Packers.

=== Carolina Panthers ===
On April 20, 2006, Diggs was signed by the Carolina Panthers to a one-year $627,000 contract. The Panthers viewed Diggs as a replacement for weakside Will Witherspoon who had left the Panthers to sign with the St. Louis Rams. In 2006 Diggs appeared in 15 games with 10 starts totaled 68 tackles, and three passes defensed.

On March 2, 2007, Diggs re-signed with the Panthers for another year (for $1.35 million) and for that season Diggs played in all 16 games with 10 starts and made 49 tackles, 3.5 sacks, one forced fumble and five passes defensed. On December 29, 2007, the Diggs accepted a three-year extension for $7 million ($2.7 million of it guaranteed). In 2008 Diggs started all 16 contests as the strongside linebacker and recorded 62 tackles, 1.0 sack, one interception, and two passes defensed. 2009 was Diggs's final season with the Panthers and he remained at strongside linebacker and played in 15 games with 11 starts and recorded 42 total tackles and a forced fumble. On March 5, 2010, the Panthers released Diggs.

=== St. Louis Rams ===
The Rams signed Diggs on April 7, 2010, to a two-year contract. The terms have not been disclosed. In his career Diggs has been the primary starter for his team four seasons at weakside linebacker and six at strongside linebacker. Diggs earned the starting strongside linebacker job in the 2010 preseason and kept the job until he tore a pectoral muscle late in the season.

On August 29, 2011, he was released by the Rams.

=== San Diego Chargers ===
Diggs signed with the San Diego Chargers on September 3, 2011.

== NFL career statistics ==
Legend
**Bold**	Career high

=== Regular season ===
Year	Team	Games		Tackles					Interceptions					Fumbles			
Year	Team	GP	GS	Cmb	Solo	Ast	Sck	TFL	Int	Yds	TD	Lng	PD	FF	FR	Yds	TD
2000	GNB	13	12	34	25	9	0.0	3	0	0	0	0	2	0	1	**52**	0
2001	GNB	**16**	**16**	69	53	16	2.0	7	0	0	0	0	6	0	0	0	0
2002	GNB	**16**	**16**	85	66	**19**	3.0	**12**	**2**	**62**	0	**33**	**7**	**1**	**2**	0	0
2003	GNB	**16**	**16**	**87**	**77**	10	1.0	**12**	**2**	13	0	13	6	0	0	0	0
2004	GNB	14	14	80	61	**19**	1.0	**12**	0	0	0	0	0	0	0	0	0
2005	GNB	9	6	35	32	3	0.0	3	0	0	0	0	0	0	1	0	0
2006	CAR	15	10	61	45	16	0.0	4	0	0	0	0	3	0	0	0	0
2007	CAR	**16**	9	58	44	14	**3.5**	6	0	0	0	0	3	**1**	1	0	0
2008	CAR	**16**	**16**	54	43	11	1.0	3	1	0	0	0	2	0	0	0	0
2009	CAR	14	11	39	33	6	0.0	3	0	0	0	0	1	**1**	0	0	0
2010	STL	12	12	36	28	8	0.0	5	0	0	0	0	2	**1**	1	3	0
2011	SDG	13	0	41	34	7	0.0	1	0	0	0	0	1	0	0	0	0
		170	138	679	541	138	11.5	71	5	75	0	33	33	4	6	55	0

=== Playoffs ===
Year	Team	Games		Tackles					Interceptions					Fumbles			
Year	Team	GP	GS	Cmb	Solo	Ast	Sck	TFL	Int	Yds	TD	Lng	PD	FF	FR	Yds	TD
2001	GNB	**2**	**2**	**9**	**8**	1	**1.0**	1	0	0	0	0	0	0	0	0	0
2002	GNB	1	1	4	2	**2**	0.0	0	0	0	0	0	0	0	0	0	0
2003	GNB	**2**	**2**	**9**	**8**	1	**1.0**	**2**	0	0	0	0	0	0	0	0	0
2004	GNB	1	1	4	4	0	0.0	**2**	0	0	0	0	0	0	0	0	0
2008	CAR	1	1	4	2	**2**	0.0	0	0	0	0	0	0	0	0	0	0
		7	7	30	24	6	2.0	5	0	0	0	0	0	0	0	0	0
