= Richard Marshall (defensive back) =

American football player (born 1984)

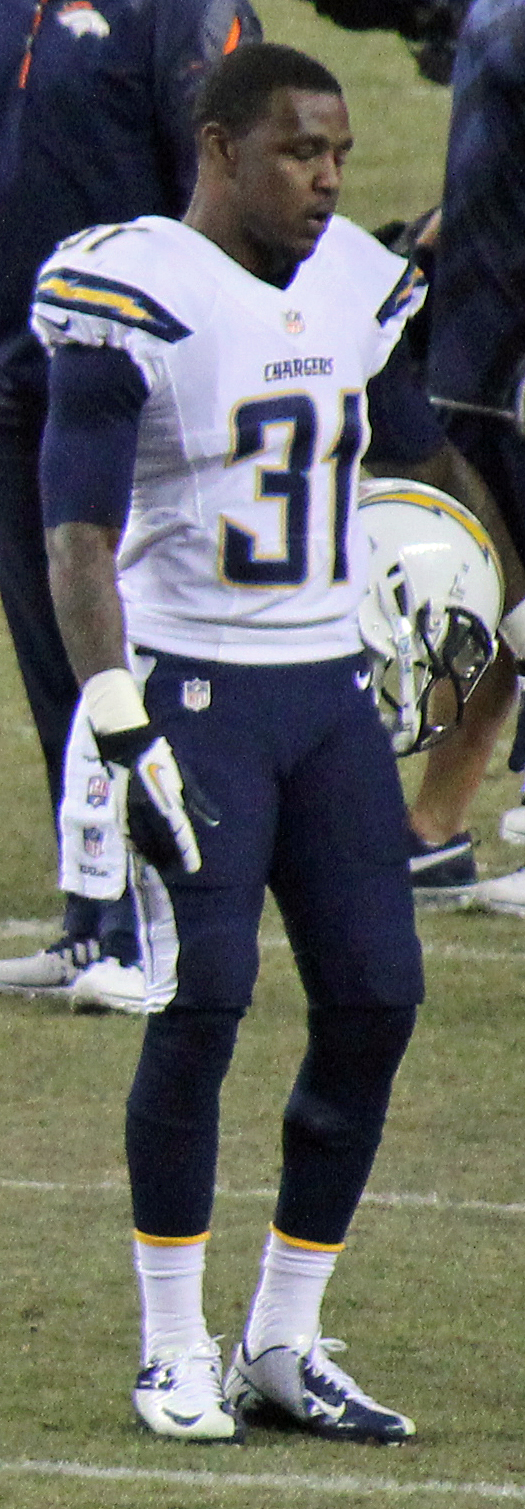
- Marshall with the San Diego Chargers in 2013

No. 31, 22
- Position: Cornerback

Personal information
- Born: December 12, 1984 (age 41); Los Angeles, California, U.S.
- Listed height: 5 ft 11 in (1.80 m)
- Listed weight: 198 lb (90 kg)

Career information
- High school: Locke (Los Angeles)
- College: Fresno State
- NFL draft: 2006: 2nd round, 58th overall pick

Career history
- Carolina Panthers (2006−2010); Arizona Cardinals (2011); Miami Dolphins (2012); San Diego Chargers (2013−2014)

Awards and highlights
- PFWA All-Rookie Team (2006); First-team All-WAC (2005); Second-team All-WAC (2004)

Career NFL statistics
- Total tackles: 611
- Sacks: 7
- Forced fumbles: 3
- Pass deflections: 69
- Interceptions: 18
- Defensive touchdowns: 2
- Stats at Pro Football Reference

Richard Thomas Marshall (born December 12, 1984) is an American former professional football player who was a cornerback in the National Football League (NFL). He played college football for the Fresno State Bulldogs and was selected by the Carolina Panthers in the second round (58th overall) of the 2006 NFL draft. Marshall also played for the Arizona Cardinals, Miami Dolphins, and San Diego Chargers.

== Early life ==
Marshall attended Alain Leroy Locke Senior High School in Los Angeles, California and won All-League and All-CIF honors.

== Professional career ==
Pre-draft measurables
Height	Weight	Arm length	Hand span	40-yard dash	10-yard split	20-yard split	20-yard shuttle	Three-cone drill	Vertical jump	Broad jump	Bench press
5 ft 11 1/8 in (1.81 m)	189 lb (86 kg)	29 3/4 in (0.76 m)	9 1/8 in (0.23 m)	4.48 s	1.52 s	2.57 s	4.16 s	6.65 s	38.5 in (0.98 m)	10 ft 9 in (3.28 m)	13 reps
All values from NFL Combine/Pro Day

=== Carolina Panthers ===
During his rookie season, Marshall played in portions of all 16 games. Marshall spent the first part of his career in the nickelback role, playing behind Chris Gamble and Ken Lucas. After the 2008 playoff season, Ken Lucas was released from the team, thus promoting Richard Marshall to the starting lineup.

The NFL Network voted a play by Marshall as the "Number 1 play of the 2008 preseason". The play involved Marshall intercepting a fake field goal flick from the holder to the kicker and running it back for a touchdown.

=== Arizona Cardinals ===
Marshall signed as an unrestricted free agent with the Arizona Cardinals on July 30, 2011.

=== Miami Dolphins ===
Marshall signed a three-year contract worth 16 million dollars as an unrestricted free agent with the Miami Dolphins on March 14, 2012. In 2012, it was reported that Marshall was out with a back injury. On August 20, 2013, he was released by the Dolphins.

=== San Diego Chargers ===
On August 23, 2013, Marshall agreed to terms on a contract with the San Diego Chargers. He was released on October 27, 2014.

== NFL career statistics ==
Legend
**Bold**	Career high

=== Regular season ===
Year	Team	Games		Tackles					Interceptions					Fumbles			
Year	Team	GP	GS	Cmb	Solo	Ast	Sck	TFL	Int	Yds	TD	Lng	PD	FF	FR	Yds	TD
2006	CAR	**16**	8	82	69	13	1.0	6	3	59	**1**	30	**15**	**2**	**4**	**25**	0
2007	CAR	**16**	6	**88**	**79**	9	1.0	**7**	3	**107**	**1**	**73**	11	0	2	0	0
2008	CAR	**16**	0	75	68	7	**2.0**	4	1	11	0	11	4	0	0	0	0
2009	CAR	**16**	**16**	**88**	75	13	0.0	0	**4**	47	0	28	9	0	2	0	0
2010	CAR	**16**	**16**	**88**	74	**14**	1.0	3	3	91	0	66	7	1	1	0	0
2011	ARI	**16**	9	78	69	9	**2.0**	5	3	83	0	49	11	0	0	0	0
2012	MIA	4	4	17	17	0	0.0	0	1	7	0	7	6	0	0	0	0
2013	SDG	**16**	6	71	57	**14**	0.0	0	0	0	0	0	6	0	1	0	0
2014	SDG	8	1	24	18	6	0.0	1	0	0	0	0	0	0	0	0	0
Career		124	66	611	526	85	7.0	26	18	405	2	73	69	3	10	25	0

=== Playoffs ===
Year	Team	Games		Tackles					Interceptions					Fumbles			
Year	Team	GP	GS	Cmb	Solo	Ast	Sck	TFL	Int	Yds	TD	Lng	PD	FF	FR	Yds	TD
2008	CAR	1	0	4	4	0	0.0	0	0	0	0	0	0	0	0	0	0
2013	SDG	**2**	**2**	**10**	**10**	0	0.0	0	0	0	0	0	0	0	**2**	**14**	0
Career		3	2	14	14	0	0.0	0	0	0	0	0	0	0	2	14	0
