= Geoff Hangartner =

American football player (born 1982)

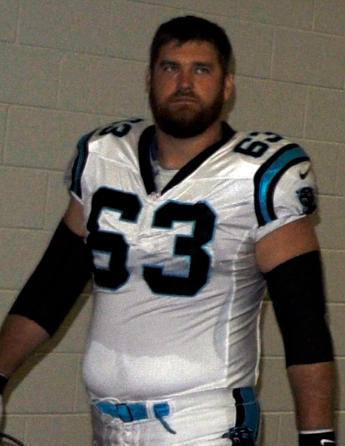
- Hangartner with the Carolina Panthers in 2012

No. 63
- Position: Guard

Personal information
- Born: April 22, 1982 (age 44); Houston, Texas, U.S.
- Listed height: 6 ft 5 in (1.96 m)
- Listed weight: 305 lb (138 kg)

Career information
- High school: New Braunfels ( New Braunfels, Texas)
- College: Texas A&M
- NFL draft: 2005: 5th round, 169th overall pick

Career history
- Carolina Panthers (2005−2008); Buffalo Bills (2009−2010); Carolina Panthers (2011−2013)

Career NFL statistics
- Games played: 113
- Games started: 84
- Stats at Pro Football Reference

Geoffrey Thomas Hangartner (born April 22, 1982) is an American former professional football player who was a guard for the Carolina Panthers of the National Football League (NFL). He was selected by the Panthers in the fifth round of the 2005 NFL draft. He played college football for the Texas A&M Aggies. He played both the center and guard positions. Hangartner also played for the Buffalo Bills.

== Early life ==
Hangartner attended New Braunfels High School in New Braunfels, Texas, and was a student and a letterman in football. In football, he helped lead his team to two state playoff appearances, and as a senior, was a first-team All-District choice and a second-team All-State selection.

== College career ==
Hangartner started 36 consecutive games at center and offensive lineman for Texas A&M. As a senior in 2004, Hangartner moved from center to tackle, where he started all 12 contests. He was also a first-team All-Big 12 choice and was selected to play in the Hula Bowl.

In the spring of 2004, Hangartner and a teammate were suspended from the team following Hangartner's arrest for driving while intoxicated. Witnesses said that racial slurs had been yelled from Hangartner's vehicle toward another car. Hangartner denied issuing any racial slurs and later took a polygraph backed up his assertions.

== Professional career ==
=== Carolina Panthers (first stint) ===
Hangartner was selected 169th overall in the fifth round of the 2005 NFL draft by the Panthers. He reportedly scored 47 (out of a possible 50) on the Wonderlic Personnel Test administered during the 2005 NFL Combine. Although he spent the entire 2005 season backing up Jeff Mitchell appearing sparingly on special teams, and as a reserve on the offensive line, he took over the starting position in the 2006 NFL season after starter Justin Hartwig went down with an injured groin muscle.

=== Buffalo Bills ===
Hangartner was signed by the Buffalo Bills on February 28, 2009, to a four-year contract worth about $10 million. He became their starting center, replacing the tandem of Melvin Fowler and Duke Preston. That year, he started all 16 games at center for a team with won-lost record of 6–10, most of them between two rookies: left offensive guard Andy Levitre and right guard Eric Wood. In 2010, the same trio started up the middle, but the Bills were going downhill at 4–12, scoring only 283 points (17.7 points/game), 28th of 32 teams in the NFL. In 2011, the Bills opted for youth, replacing Hangartner with Wood. Hangartner was released on September 3, 2011.

=== Carolina Panthers (second stint) ===
On September 5, 2011, Hangartner was signed for a second time by the Carolina Panthers. He started all 16 games in 2011 at right guard—next to All-Pro center Ryan Kalil—and was instrumental in the Panthers' resurgence as a potent offense, with rookie Cam Newton at quarterback. He started 12 games in 2012, including eight at center to fill in for an injured Kalil. For the 2013 season, Hangartner was expected to move back to his starting right guard spot next to a healthy Kalil. However, on August 1, 2013—during training camp—Hangartner was released by the Panthers, as they chose instead to focus on their younger linemen.

On November 5, 2013, the Panthers re-signed Hangartner after a three-month absence to help with injuries on the offensive line. Hangartner announced his retirement on March 11, 2014.
