= Drew Carter =

American football player (born 1981)

No. 18
- Position: Wide receiver

Personal information
- Born: September 5, 1981 (age 45); Solon, Ohio, U.S.
- Listed height: 6 ft 3 in (1.91 m)
- Listed weight: 200 lb (91 kg)

Career information
- High school: Solon
- College: Ohio State
- NFL draft: 2004: 5th round, 163rd overall pick

Career history
- Carolina Panthers (2004–2007); Oakland Raiders (2008)

Awards and highlights
- BCS national champion (2002)

Career NFL statistics
- Receptions: 71
- Receiving yards: 977
- Receiving touchdowns: 8
- Stats at Pro Football Reference

Christopher Drew Carter (born September 5, 1981) is an American former professional football player who was a wide receiver in the National Football League (NFL). He was selected by the Carolina Panthers in the fifth round of the 2004 NFL draft. He played college football for the Ohio State Buckeyes. He was also a member of the Oakland Raiders.

== Early life ==
At Solon High School, Carter tallied 33 receptions for 890 yards and thirteen touchdowns as a senior in his first season of football. He registered three touchdown catches in his football debut.

== College career ==
Carter attended Ohio State University. His college career was marred by several injuries to his knees and ankles. He produced 41 catches for 632 yards and one touchdown during his college career.

== Professional career ==
=== Carolina Panthers ===
Carter spent his rookie season in 2004 on injured reserve after tearing his ACL during June coaching sessions. He missed additional time throughout his career with injuries to his ankle. He made the team roster midway through the 2005 NFL season after the team released Rod Gardner, and taking his first catch 44 yards to set up a Panthers score. In the Panthers' three post-season games that season, he had 4 receptions for 131 yards and a touchdown, a franchise record for most yards per catch in a single postseason (32.75). In 2007 Carter had his most productive NFL regular season, making 38 catches for 517 yards and 4 touchdowns, all of which were among the team's top three performances.

=== Oakland Raiders ===
On March 12, 2008, he signed with the Oakland Raiders as a free agent.

On Saturday August 23, 2008, Carter suffered a season-ending injury when he tore the ACL in his left knee during the Oakland Raiders third preseason game versus the Arizona Cardinals. He was placed on injured reserve on August 25.
