= Marty Hurney =

American football executive (born 1955)

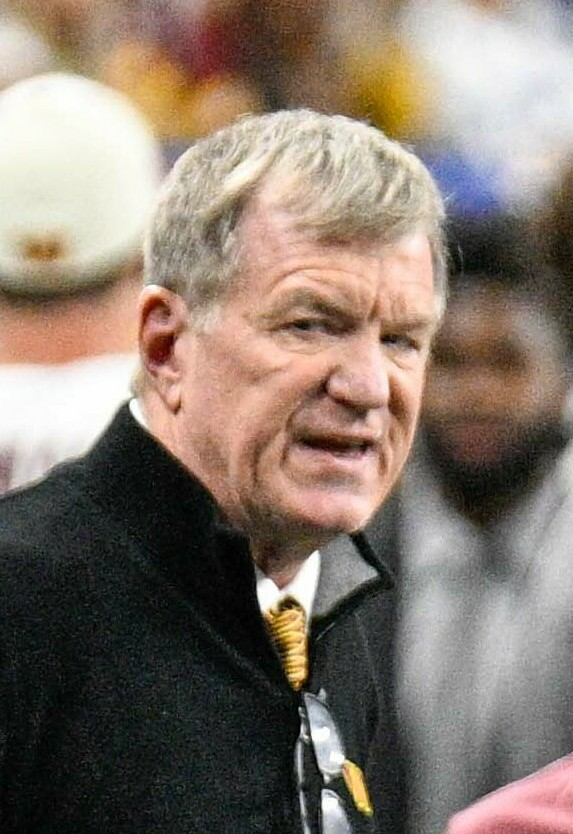
- Hurney in 2022

Personal information
- Born: December 20, 1955 (age 70); Wheaton, Maryland, U.S.

Career information
- High school: Our Lady of Good Counsel (Olney, Maryland)
- College: Catholic University

Career history
- Washington Redskins (1988–1989) Public relations; San Diego Chargers (1990–1997) Coordinator of football operations; Carolina Panthers (1998) Director of football administration; Carolina Panthers (1999–2001) Director of player operations; Carolina Panthers (2002–2012, 2017–2020) General manager; Washington Football Team / Commanders (2021–2023) Executive vice president of football/player personnel; Washington Commanders (2024) Advisor
- Executive profile at Pro Football Reference

Marty Hurney (born December 20, 1955) is an American former professional football executive. He served as an administrator for the San Diego Chargers in the 1990s before working as the general manager of the Carolina Panthers throughout much of the 2000s and 2010s. Hurney was a sportswriter for Washington, D.C.–based newspapers in the 1980s and became a racehorse owner in 2025.

== Early life ==
Hurney was born on December 20, 1955, and grew up in Wheaton, Maryland. He attended Our Lady of Good Counsel High School before attending Catholic University of America, where he played as an offensive guard for their football team before stopping after his sophomore year to focus on sportswriting for their student newspaper The Tower. He graduated with a Bachelor of Arts degree in general studies in 1978.

== Executive career ==
=== Early career ===
Hurney worked as a sportswriter for The Washington Star from 1978 until the publication folded in 1981. He then worked as a beat reporter covering the Washington Redskins for The Washington Times before joining the team's public relations department in 1988. In 1990, he followed former Redskin general manager Bobby Beathard to the San Diego Chargers where he worked primarily on administrative duties such as organizing internal departments and negotiating player contracts.

=== Carolina Panthers ===
Hurney joined the Carolina Panthers in 1998 as their director of football administration before being named the director of player operations the following season. He was promoted to general manager in 2002, a position he held until being fired midway through the 2012 season. His time with the team oversaw several All-Pro players drafted by him, such as defensive end Julius Peppers, quarterback Cam Newton, and linebackers Luke Kuechly and Thomas Davis Sr.

In July 2017, after general manager Dave Gettleman was fired by the Panthers, Hurney was re-hired to serve as the team's interim general manager. In February 2018, he was placed on paid administrative leave as the NFL began an investigation into whether he had violated the league's personal conduct policy. He was reinstated by the Panthers later that month after no evidence was found and was subsequently named the fulltime general manager. He was fired again by the team in December 2020 over differences with newly appointed owner David Tepper and head coach Matt Rhule.

=== Washington Football Team / Commanders ===
On January 22, 2021, Hurney was hired as the executive vice president of football for player personnel for the Washington Commanders. In 2024, he served in an advisory role following a front office restructuring and left the team following the season.

== Personal life ==
Hurney bought WZGV, an ESPN Radio affiliate based in Charlotte, in 2012. It is operated by his wife, Tamara Hurney. In 2025, he founded JJE Thoroughbreds and became the co-owner of a racehorse, Innova.
