= Brandon Jamison =

American football player (born 1981)

No. 54, 57
- Position: Linebacker

Personal information
- Born: July 31, 1981 (age 45); Hopkins, South Carolina, U.S.

Career information
- College: Clemson; West Georgia

Career history
- 2006: Atlanta Falcons
- 2006–2007: Carolina Panthers

Career statistics
- Total tackles: 7
- Stats at Pro Football Reference

Brandon Leon Jamison (born July 31, 1981) is an American former professional football player who was a linebacker in the National Football League (NFL). He played college football for the Clemson Tigers and West Georgia Wolves. Jamison played in the NFL for the Atlanta Falcons in 2006 and the Carolina Panthers from 2006 to 2007. In the fall of 1999, Jamison was an all-state player with 161 tackles, including five sacks. Consequently, The State ranked him as the sixth best player in South Carolina.
