= Dave Magazu =

American football coach (1957–2021)

Personal information
- Born: June 10, 1957; Taunton, Massachusetts, U.S.
- Died: December 17, 2021 (aged 64); Mooresville, North Carolina, U.S.

Career information
- High school: Taunton
- College: Springfield College

Career history
- Ithaca (1980) Graduate assistant; Western Michigan (1981) Offensive tackles & tight ends coach; Eastern Michigan (1982) Offensive line & tight ends coach; Michigan (1983) Graduate assistant; Northern Illinois (1984) Offensive tackles & tight ends coach; Ball State (1985-1986) Offensive coordinator; Navy (1987-1989) Offensive line coach & special teams coordinator; Indiana State (1990-1991) Offensive coordinator & offensive line coach; Colorado State (1992-1994) Offensive line coach; Kentucky (1995-1996) Offensive line coach; Memphis (1997-1998) Co-offensive coordinator & offensive line coach; Boston College (1999-2002) Offensive line coach; Carolina Panthers (2003–2006) Tight ends coach; Carolina Panthers (2007-2010) Offensive line coach; Denver Broncos (2011–2014) Offensive line coach; Chicago Bears (2015–2016) Offensive line coach; Birmingham Iron (2019) Offensive line coach

David Anthony Magazu (June 10, 1957 – December 17, 2021) was an offensive line coach and a tight ends coach with the Carolina Panthers, Denver Broncos, Chicago Bears, and Birmingham Iron.

== Early life ==
Dave Magazu was born in Taunton, Massachusetts to Damon Magazu and Carole Magazu.
