= Jeff King (American football) =

American football player and executive (born 1983)

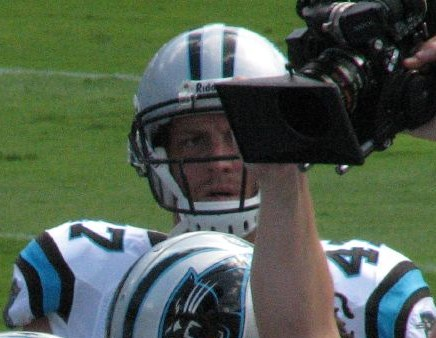
- King with the Carolina Panthers in 2008

Chicago Bears
- Title: Assistant general manager

Personal information
- Born: February 19, 1983 (age 43); Pulaski, Virginia, U.S.
- Listed height: 6 ft 3 in (1.91 m)
- Listed weight: 260 lb (118 kg)

Career information
- Position: Tight end (No. 87, 47)
- High school: Pulaski County (Dublin, Virginia)
- College: Virginia Tech (2001–2005)
- NFL draft: 2006: 5th round, 155th overall pick

Career history

Playing
- Carolina Panthers (2006–2010); Arizona Cardinals (2011–2013)

Operations
- Chicago Bears (2015); Scouting intern (2015); Pro scout (2016-2018); Assistant director of pro scouting (2019-2020); Director of pro scouting (2021); Co-director of player personnel (2023); Senior director of player personnel (2024-2025); Assistant general manager (2026-present)

Awards and highlights
- 2× Second-team All-ACC (2004, 2005)

Career NFL statistics
- Receptions: 156
- Receiving yards: 1,323
- Receiving touchdowns: 12
- Stats at Pro Football Reference

Jeffery Wayne King (born February 19, 1983) is an American football executive and former tight end who is the assistant general manager for the Chicago Bears of the National Football League (NFL). He previously served in various scouting roles for the Bears since 2015.

King played college football and basketball at Virginia Tech. He was selected by the Carolina Panthers in the fifth round of the 2006 NFL draft and played 8 seasons in the NFL for the Panthers and Arizona Cardinals.

== Early life ==
A PrepStar All-American for Coach Joel Hicks at Pulaski County High School, King rated the No. 3 tight end in the Atlantic Region. He was named first-team Group AAA all-state as a tight end by the Associated Press and the state coaches. He was ranked the No. 12 prospect in Virginia by The Roanoke Times and SuperPrep. He was an honorable mention All-South pick by the Orlando Sentinel. He led his high school team to the Group AAA, Division 5 state semifinals in 2000. He finished his senior season with 278 yards receiving and eight touchdowns. He also registered eight sacks as a defensive end. He set a school record with 101 pancake blocks in a season. He had 12 pancakes and two receptions for 30 yards and a touchdown in a game his senior year. He was named All-Timesland as a junior and senior.

King was also a basketball player who compiled over 1,000 points and 1,000 rebounds during his career. He averaged 25 points and 14 rebounds as a senior on the way to all-district and all-region honors. He also competed in the shot put for the track team with a best effort of 54' 7" as a junior. He was also a member of the National Honor Society.

== College career ==
King redshirted his freshman season in 2001. In 2002, King played in all 14 games for Virginia Tech making only one reception, a 19-yard touchdown against Arkansas State. He also blocked a field goal against Western Michigan.

In 2003, King played in 13 games with two starts. He made six receptions for 109 yards and one touchdown. He also blocked a field goal against Rutgers. In 2004, King became a starter. He started all 13 games, posting 25 receptions for 304 yards and four touchdowns. He was also a Second-team All-ACC choice.

In 2005, he started all 13 games. He recorded a career-high 26 catches for 292 yards and six touchdowns, a school single-season record for tight ends, and became the first player in school history to catch a touchdown pass in four consecutive games. He also blocked a field goal against Georgia Tech that the Hokies returned for a touchdown. He was also a second-team All-ACC selection.

In his college career, King set a school record for touchdown catches by a tight end with 11, bettering the previous mark of eight. He also blocked three kicks on special teams.

== Professional career ==
Pre-draft measurables
Height	Weight	Arm length	Hand span	40-yard dash	10-yard split	20-yard split	20-yard shuttle	Three-cone drill	Vertical jump	Broad jump	Bench press
6 ft 5 1/8 in (1.96 m)	245 lb (111 kg)	32 5/8 in (0.83 m)	9 1/2 in (0.24 m)	4.87 s	1.66 s	2.79 s	4.09 s	6.99 s	34.0 in (0.86 m)	9 ft 2 in (2.79 m)	24 reps
All values from NFL Combine/Pro Day

=== Carolina Panthers ===
King was selected in the fifth round of the 2006 NFL draft by the Carolina Panthers. He played in 12 games in his rookie season, and scored a touchdown on his only reception of the season in a game against the Atlanta Falcons.

In 2007, his first year as a starter, King recorded 46 receptions for 406 yards and two touchdowns. King made his then career long reception during the Panthers week three win over the Atlanta Falcons, with a 29-yard catch. He also had a single-game career high in receptions with 10 during a week eight loss to the Indianapolis Colts.

With the return of Muhsin Muhammad to the Panthers in 2008, King changed numbers from #87 to #47. King recorded 21 receptions for 195 yards and had one touchdown reception against the Detroit Lions. King also improved his career long catch, with at 31-yard reception against the Arizona Cardinals.

=== Arizona Cardinals ===
King was signed by the Arizona Cardinals on July 29, 2011.

== Career statistics ==
=== NFL ===
Year	Team	G	Rec	Yards	Y/R	TD	LNG	FUM	LOST
2006	Carolina	12	1	1	1.0	1	1	0	0
2007	Carolina	16	46	406	8.8	2	29	2	1
2008	Carolina	16	21	195	9.3	1	31	0	0
2009	Carolina	16	25	200	8.0	3	32	1	0
Total		60	93	802	8.5	7	32	3	1

=== College ===
Year	Team	G	Rec	Yards	Y/R	TD	LNG	FUM	LOST
2001	Virginia Tech	–	–	–	–	–	–	–	–
2002	Virginia Tech	14	1	19	19.0	1	19	–	–
2003	Virginia Tech	13	6	109	18.2	1	31	–	–
2004	Virginia Tech	13	25	304	12.2	4	35	0	0
2005	Virginia Tech	13	26	292	11.2	6	28	0	0
Total		53	58	724	12.5	11	35	0	0

== Executive career ==
In 2015, King was hired by the Chicago Bears as a scouting intern under general manager Ryan Pace. In 2016, King was promoted to pro scout. He was promoted to assistant director of pro scouting in 2019, and promoted again to director of pro scouting on July 6, 2021. On May 3, 2022, King was promoted to co-director of player personnel along with Trey Koziol under general manager Ryan Poles. On February 19, 2026, King was elevated to the position of assistant general manager of the Chicago Bears, replacing Ian Cunningham, who was hired as the general manager of the Atlanta Falcons.

== Personal life ==
King graduated with a degree in finance and is enrolled in health and physical education in graduate school.
