= Nate Salley =

American football player (born 1984)

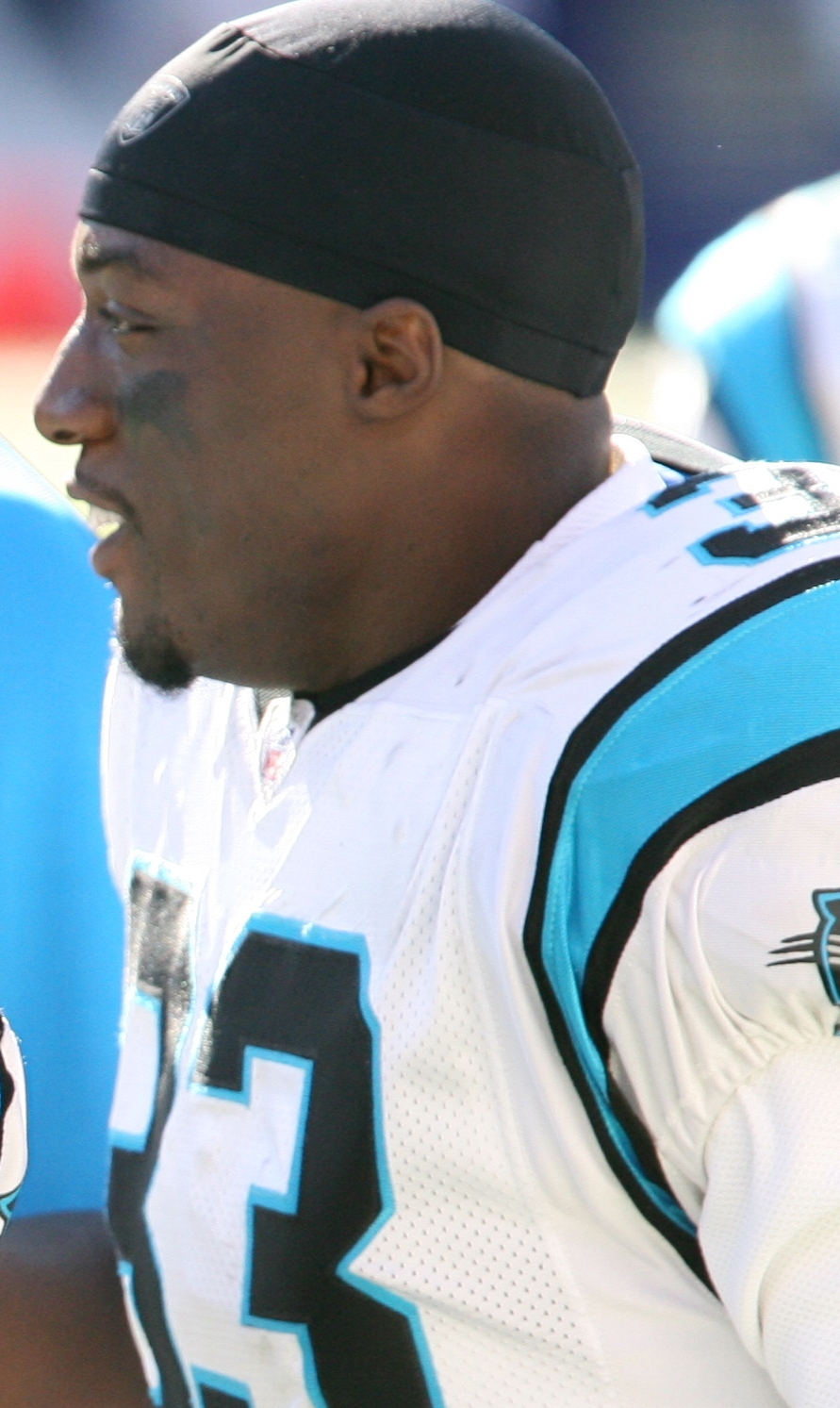
- Salley with the Carolina Panthers in 2006

No. 33, 25, 22
- Position: Safety

Personal information
- Born: February 5, 1984 (age 42); Fort Lauderdale, Florida, U.S.
- Listed height: 6 ft 1 in (1.85 m)
- Listed weight: 216 lb (98 kg)

Career information
- High school: St. Thomas Aquinas (Fort Lauderdale, Florida)
- College: Ohio State
- NFL draft: 2006: 4th round, 121st overall pick

Career history
- Carolina Panthers (2006–2009); Florida Tuskers (2010); Virginia Destroyers (2011)*
- * Offseason or practice squad member only

Awards and highlights
- BCS national champion (2002); First-team All-Big Ten (2005); Second-team All-Big Ten (2004)

Career NFL statistics
- Total tackles: 11
- Stats at Pro Football Reference

Nate Salley Jr. (born February 5, 1984) is an American former professional football player who was a safety in the National Football League (NFL). He was selected by the Carolina Panthers in the fourth round of the 2006 NFL draft. He played college football and college basketball for the Ohio State Buckeyes.

Pre-draft measurables
Height	Weight	Arm length	Hand span	40-yard dash	10-yard split	20-yard split	20-yard shuttle	Three-cone drill	Vertical jump	Broad jump	Bench press
6 ft 1 3/4 in (1.87 m)	216 lb (98 kg)	32 in (0.81 m)	8 3/4 in (0.22 m)	4.53 s	1.60 s	2.71 s	4.15 s	6.79 s	40.0 in (1.02 m)	10 ft 3 in (3.12 m)	14 reps
All values from NFL Combine/Pro Day

== Early life ==
He was a two sport star at St. Thomas Aquinas High School in Fort Lauderdale. Salley was a member both the football and basketball state championship teams at St. Thomas Aquinas before graduating in 2002.
