= Justin Hartwig =

American football player (born 1978)

No. 62, 75, 77
- Position: Center

Personal information
- Born: November 21, 1978 (age 47); Mankato, Minnesota, U.S.
- Listed height: 6 ft 5 in (1.96 m)
- Listed weight: 312 lb (142 kg)

Career information
- High school: Valley (West Des Moines, Iowa)
- College: Kansas
- NFL draft: 2002: 6th round, 187th overall pick

Career history
- Tennessee Titans (2002–2005); Carolina Panthers (2006–2007); Pittsburgh Steelers (2008–2009)

Awards and highlights
- Super Bowl champion (XLIII); Second-team All-Big 12 (2001)

Career NFL statistics
- Games played: 99
- Games started: 95
- Stats at Pro Football Reference

Justin Hartwig (born November 21, 1978) is an American former professional football player who was a center in the National Football League (NFL). He played college football for the Kansas Jayhawks and was selected by the Tennessee Titans in the sixth round of the 2002 NFL draft. Hartwig also played for the Carolina Panthers and Pittsburgh Steelers. With the Steelers, he won Super Bowl XLIII.

== Early life ==
Hartwig earned All-Conference and second-team All-State honors as a senior offensive tackle at Valley High School in West Des Moines, Iowa. He earned honorable mention All-Conference after leading his high school basketball team in rebounding. In track and field, he won the conference discus title in two consecutive years.

== College career ==
Hartwig played college football at the University of Kansas, where he was a three-year starter at right tackle who appeared in 38 games with 34 starts. He was named honorable mention All-Big 12 as a junior and earned second-team All-Big 12 honors as a senior captain. He was a communication studies major.

== Professional career ==
=== Tennessee Titans ===
Hartwig was selected in the 2002 NFL draft by the Tennessee Titans. In his rookie season, he played in the final three regular season games, primarily on special teams. He was inactive for the previous 13 games. In 2003, he started every game at center for Titans and helped Steve McNair lead the league in passing while Eddie George recorded his seventh 1,000-yard rushing season. He was a member of offensive line ranked tied for sixth in the league in fewest sacks allowed with 25. The offense ranked fourth overall in the AFC (eighth in NFL). Hartwig won starting center job with four preseason starts after never playing center prior to training camp. He started 47 games in 3 years.

=== Carolina Panthers ===
Hartwig signed a free agent contract with the Carolina Panthers in 2006, starting one game before being placed on injured reserve with a groin injury. Hartwig entered the 2007 season as the starting center for the Panthers. However, he was released after the season to make room for second-year player Ryan Kalil.

=== Pittsburgh Steelers ===
On March 18, 2008, the Pittsburgh Steelers signed Hartwig to a two-year contract, worth approximately US$4 million. Hartwig earned the starting spot at center for the 2008 season. He was also in the starting lineup for the Steelers victorious Super Bowl XLIII appearance against the Arizona Cardinals. Towards the end of the game, Hartwig committed a near-disastrous holding penalty in the end zone, which resulted in a safety and negated a first down pass which could have sealed the game up. The Cardinals then scored a touchdown to go up by three points, making the game critical for the Steelers as there were less than three minutes left in the game, but on the ensuing drive, the Steelers managed to get a touchdown and win the game by a final score of 27–23.

On September 5, 2010, Hartwig was released by the Steelers after being beaten out for the starting job by rookie Maurkice Pouncey.
