= Ken Flajole =

American football player and coach (born 1954)

Stanford Cardinal football
- Title: Senior Defensive Analyst

Personal information
- Born: October 4, 1954 (age 72); Seattle, Washington, U.S.

Career information
- High school: Seattle Prep (WA)
- College: Pacific Lutheran

Career history
- Pacific Lutheran (1977–1978) Defensive line & linebackers coach; Washington (1979) Assistant coach; Montana (1980–1985) Defensive coordinator; UTEP (1986–1988) Defensive backs coach; Missouri (1989–1993) Defensive backs coach; Richmond (1994) Defensive coordinator; Hawaii (1995) Defensive coordinator; Nevada (1996–1997) Defensive coordinator & defensive backs coach; Green Bay Packers (1998) Defensive quality control coach; Seattle Seahawks (1999) Defensive backs coach; Seattle Seahawks (2000) Linebackers coach; Seattle Seahawks (2001–2002) Defensive backs coach; Carolina Panthers (2003–2008) Linebackers coach; St. Louis Rams (2009–2011) Defensive coordinator; New Orleans Saints (2012) Defensive backs coach; Cleveland Browns (2013–2015) Inside linebackers coach; Philadelphia Eagles (2016–2020) Linebackers coach; Kansas City Chiefs (2021–2023) Outside linebackers coach; Stanford (2025–present) Senior Defensive Analyst

Awards and highlights
- 3× Super Bowl champion (LII, LVII, LVIII)
- Coaching profile at Pro Football Reference

Ken Flajole (born October 4, 1954) is an American football coach who is currently a senior defensive analyst for Stanford. He was the defensive coordinator for the St. Louis Rams from 2009 to 2011. He won Super Bowl LII as the linebackers coach of the Philadelphia Eagles in 2017 as well as Super Bowl LVII in 2022 and Super Bowl LVIII in 2023 as the outside linebackers coach for the Kansas City Chiefs of the National Football League (NFL).

== Playing career ==
An all-conference linebacker at Wenatchee Valley Community College and Pacific Lutheran University, Flajole earned a bachelor's degree in education from Pacific Lutheran in 1977. In high school, he was an all-state linebacker at Seattle Prep.

== Coaching career ==
=== College ===
Before entering the NFL as a defensive quality control assistant with Green Bay in 1998, Flajole spent 21 years coaching in the college ranks. He served as Nevada's co-defensive coordinator/secondary coach for two seasons from 1996 to 1997. His 1996 defense finished first in the conference in total defense, scoring defense and passing defense. Prior to his duties at Nevada, Flajole coached at seven other college programs, beginning with his alma mater, Pacific Lutheran, from 1977 to 1978, and then Washington in 1979. Other stops included Montana (1980–1985), UTEP (1986–1988), Missouri (1989–1993), Richmond (1994), and Hawaii (1995), holding defensive coordinator positions at Montana and Richmond.

=== NFL ===
Flajole replaced Sal Sunseri as linebackers coach for the Carolina Panthers in 2003, bringing with him five years of NFL coaching experience. He spent three seasons as defensive backs coach and one as linebackers coach with the Seattle Seahawks from 1999–2002 and one as a defensive assistant with the Green Bay Packers in 1998, all under head coach Mike Holmgren. As defensive backs coach for Seattle in 1999, Flajole's secondary led the NFL with 30 interceptions, including two that were returned for touchdowns. He spent the 2000 campaign as the Seahawks linebackers coach and returned to oversee the defensive backs in 2001 and 2002.

Flajole was the defensive coordinator of the St. Louis Rams from 2009 to 2011. He was hired by the New Orleans Saints in 2012, but was fired (along with defensive coordinator Steve Spagnuolo, with whom he had also coached in St. Louis) on January 24, 2013. The Browns hired him as their inside linebackers coach on February 7, 2013. He was a member of the Browns' coaching staff from 2013–2015, until he was hired by new Philadelphia Eagles head coach Doug Pederson as linebackers coach on January 20, 2016. Flajole won his first Super Bowl ring when the Eagles defeated the New England Patriots in Super Bowl LII.

Flajole was hired by the Kansas City Chiefs as their outside linebackers coach on April 2, 2021. In 2022, Flajole won his second Super Bowl ring when the Chiefs defeated Flajole's former team Philadelphia Eagles 38–35 in Super Bowl LVII. In 2023, Flajole won his third Super Bowl when the Chiefs defeated San Francisco 49ers 25–22 in Super Bowl LVIII.
