= Stanley McClover =

American football player (born 1984)

No. 74, 95
- Position: Defensive end

Personal information
- Born: December 16, 1984 (age 41); Fort Lauderdale, Florida, U.S.
- Listed height: 6 ft 2 in (1.88 m)
- Listed weight: 260 lb (118 kg)

Career information
- High school: Dillard (Fort Lauderdale)
- College: Auburn
- NFL draft: 2006: 7th round, 237th overall pick

Career history
- Carolina Panthers (2006–2007); Houston Texans (2008–2009); Chicago Rush (2011, 2013)*; Los Angeles KISS (2015)*
- * Offseason or practice squad member only

Awards and highlights
- Second-team All-SEC (2004); Second-team Freshman All-American (2004)

Career NFL statistics
- Total tackles: 8
- Sacks: 1
- Stats at Pro Football Reference

Stanley McClover (born December 16, 1984) is an American former professional football player who was a defensive end in the National Football League (NFL). He played college football for the Auburn Tigers and was selected by the Carolina Panthers in the seventh round of the 2006 NFL draft.

== Early life ==
McClover was a star defensive lineman at Dillard High in Fort Lauderdale. As a junior, he racked up 110 tackles, 13 sacks, three fumble recoveries, three blocked extra points and seven batted passes. A four-star and ranked as the nation's No. 11 strongside defensive end by Rivals.com, McClover finished his senior season with 100 tackles, 20 tackles-for-loss, six forced fumbles and 32 sacks on the season. He was the leader of a young Dillard squad that finished 7–5, falling in the second round of the Class 6A playoffs. He ended up with 58 sacks in his high school career.

== College career ==
Prior to attending Auburn, McClover had previously committed to Ohio State University and also considered a number of offers including Miami, Florida, Michigan State, LSU and Tennessee. He played in 24 games with nine starts for Auburn and produced 66 tackles, 15.5 sacks, 13 quarterback pressures, five forced fumbles and five passes defensed.

In 2003, he was a partial qualifier that could practice but could not play. He was a Second-Team Sporting News Freshman All-America selection and a First Team All-SEC selection as well. He played in all 13 games, starting two and finished with 35 tackles, including 20 solo and led the team with four forced fumbles. He tied for the team lead with 7.5 sacks and led the team with nine quarterback hurries and tied for the team lead with 10 tackles for loss. In 2005, he was All-SEC honorable mention and played in 11 games with seven starts. He led the Tigers with eight sacks, registered 31 tackles, one forced fumble, and three passes defensed.

=== Pay-to-Play claims ===
In a 2011 interview with Andrea Kremer for HBO's "Pay to Play," McClover claimed that he was paid to play football during his career at Auburn.

== Professional career ==
Pre-draft measurables
| Height | Weight | Arm length | Hand span | 40-yard dash | 10-yard split | 20-yard split | 20-yard shuttle | Three-cone drill | Vertical jump | Broad jump | Bench press |
|---|---|---|---|---|---|---|---|---|---|---|---|
| 6 ft 2 3/8 in (1.89 m) | 262 lb (119 kg) | 33 5/8 in (0.85 m) | 10 1/8 in (0.26 m) | 4.71 s | 1.63 s | 2.73 s | 4.50 s | 7.87 s | 39.0 in (0.99 m) | 9 ft 6 in (2.90 m) | 19 reps |
All values from NFL Combine

=== Carolina Panthers ===
McClover was selected by the Carolina Panthers in the seventh round (237th overall) of the 2006 NFL draft on April 30, 2006. In 2006, he played in two games and was inactive for 14 contests and accounted for one quarterback hurry. In 2007, he played in 11 games and was inactive for five contests and made 12 tackles, one sack and two quarterback hurries. He was waived by the Panthers on August. 30, 2008.

=== Houston Texans ===
McClover was signed by the Houston Texans on August 31, 2008. He was placed on the reserve/injured list on September 11, 2008. He was then re-signed by the Texans on February 28, 2009. He was waived/injured on August 18 and subsequently reverted to injured reserve.

== Personal life ==
McClover's younger brother, Brian Burns, was selected by the Carolina Panthers in the first round of the 2019 NFL draft.
