= Rucker (surname) =

Rucker or Rücker is a surname. Notable people with the surname include:

- Allen Rucker (born 1945), American author
- Sir Arthur William Rucker (1848–1915), British physicist
- Atterson Rucker (1847–1924), American politician
- Augusta Rucker (1873-1963), American doctor and zoologist
- Benjamin Rucker (1889–1934), African American stage magician known as Black Herman
- Clyde Rucker, American entrepreneur and businessman
- Dana Rucker (1868–1949), American educator, college football player, and coach
- Daniel H. Rucker (1812–1910), American United States Army General
- Darius Rucker (born 1966), American musician (Hootie and the Blowfish and a country solo act)
- Dave Rucker (born 1957), American Professional Baseball player
- Denise Krepp, Obama political appointee, born Kathryn Denise Rucker
- Derek Rucker (born 1966), Australian basketballer
- Doug Rucker (born 1927), American architect and author
- Edgar P. Rucker (1861–1908), West Virginia Attorney General and brother of William W. Rucker
- Edmund Rucker (1835–1924), Confederate officer during the American Civil War
- Edward Rucker (1894–1951), highly decorated American Army pilot
- Eric Rucker (born 1952), American member of the Kansas State Senate
- Foster Purcell Rucker (1905/1906–1989), birth name of American broadcaster Galen Drake
- Frostee Rucker (born 1983), American football defensive end for the Arizona Cardinals
- Gabriel Rucker (born 1981), American chef and restauranteur
- Gerta Rücker (born 1955), German statistician
- Henry A. Rucker (1852–1924), African American entrepreneur and politician
- Jake Rucker (born 1999), American baseball player
- Jane Rucker (1830–1907), American pioneer and real estate investor
- Jane Hadley Barkley (1911–1964), Second Lady of the United States, born Elizabeth Jane Rucker
- Jennie Mae Rucker, American educator and librarian
- Joe Rucker (born 1976), American Country musician
- Johnny Rucker (1917–1985), American baseball player
- Joseph T. Rucker (1887–1957), American cinematographer
- Kaimon Rucker (born 2002), American football player
- Lynda Rucker, American author
- Mars Rucker (born 1997), American actor and musician
- Martin Rucker (American football) (born 1985), American football tight end
- Martin T. Rucker (born 1957), Democratic member of the Missouri House of Representatives
- Michael Rucker (baseball) (born 1994), American baseball player
- Mike Rucker (born 1975), American football defensive end for the Carolina Panthers
- Nap Rucker (1884–1970), left-handed pitcher in Major League Baseball
- Patricia Rucker (born 1974), West Virginia state Senator
- Philip Rucker, American journalist
- Reggie Rucker (born 1947), American football player
- Robert D. Rucker (born 1952), Indiana Supreme Court justice
- Robert Malcolm Rucker (1932–2001), American painter
- Rudy Rucker (born 1946), American computer scientist and science fiction author
- Sandra Rucker (born 1987), American figure skater
- Stephen Rucker (born 1949), American television composer
- Steve Rucker (born 1954), American drummer
- Tinsley W. Rucker Jr. (1848–1926), American politician, soldier and lawyer
- Trey Rucker (born 2001), American football player
- Ursula Rucker, American spoken word recording artist
- William Waller Rucker (1855–1936), American politician, brother of Edgar Rucker

== See also ==
- Ruck (disambiguation), includes list of people with surname Ruck
