= Frostee Rucker =

American football player (born 1983)

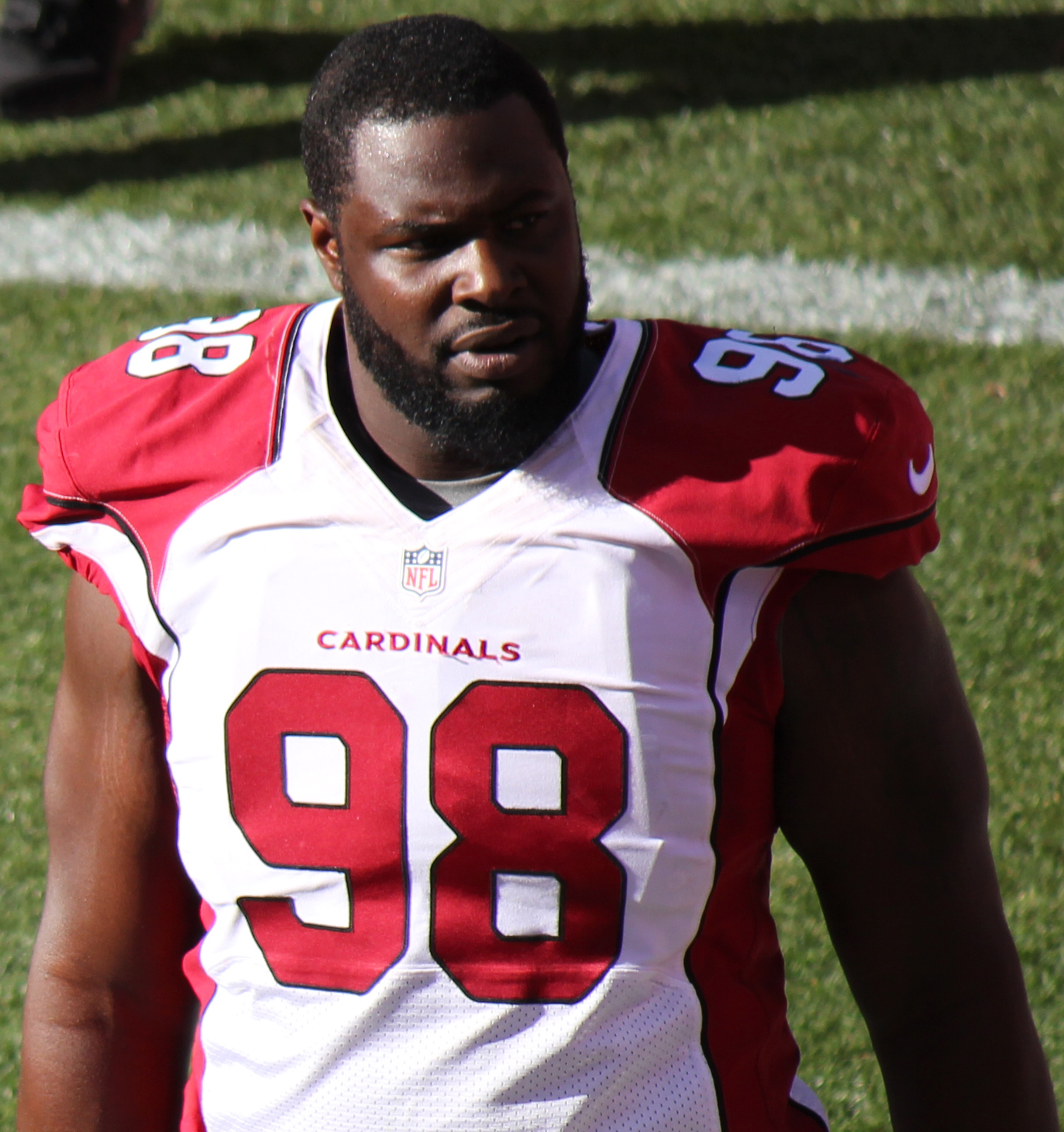
- Rucker with the Arizona Cardinals in 2014

No. 92, 98
- Position: Defensive lineman

Personal information
- Born: September 14, 1983 (age 43); Tustin, California, U.S.
- Listed height: 6 ft 3 in (1.91 m)
- Listed weight: 261 lb (118 kg)

Career information
- High school: Tustin
- College: USC
- NFL draft: 2006: 3rd round, 91st overall pick

Career history
- Cincinnati Bengals (2006–2011); Cleveland Browns (2012); Arizona Cardinals (2013–2017); Oakland Raiders (2018)

Awards and highlights
- First-team All-Pac-10 (2005)

Career NFL statistics
- Total tackles: 296
- Sacks: 21.5
- Forced fumbles: 8
- Fumble recoveries: 3
- Pass deflections: 12
- Interceptions: 1
- Stats at Pro Football Reference

Frostee Lynn Rucker (born September 14, 1983) is an American former professional football player who played defensive lineman in the National Football League (NFL) for 13 seasons. Rucker's football career was also marked by legal controversies involving allegations of sexual assault and domestic violence. His reported legal history includes a rape charge in 1997, a sexual assault charge in 2001,a rape charge in 2002 and a domestic violence charge in 2005.

He played college football at Colorado State University before transferring to the University of Southern California (USC), where he was a member of the Trojans' national championship teams. Rucker was selected by the Cincinnati Bengals in the third round of the 2006 NFL Draft and subsequently played for the Cleveland Browns, Arizona Cardinals, and Oakland Raiders.

On July 5, 2006, ESPN's Outside the Lines reportedly aired a segment concerning Rucker's past, bringing national attention to allegations surrounding the NFL player.

== Early life ==
Rucker went to Tustin High School in Tustin, California, which DeShaun Foster, Matt McCoy, Chris Chester and Sam Baker also attended. He played running back and linebacker at Tustin High School and was named All-Golden West League MVP as a Senior in 2000. He attended Santa Ana High School during his junior year and earned All-League honors as a linebacker. He played both his freshman and senior years at Tustin High.

== College career ==
Rucker attended Colorado State before transferring and playing at USC from 2002 to 2005. Vince Young famously beat Rucker to the corner to seal the University of Texas’s victory over USC in the 2005 NCAA National Championship Game.

== Professional career ==
=== Pre-draft ===
Pre-draft measurables
Height	Weight	Arm length	Hand span	40-yard dash	10-yard split	20-yard split	Vertical jump	Broad jump	Bench press
6 ft 3 1/4 in (1.91 m)	267 lb (121 kg)	32 1/4 in (0.82 m)	10 in (0.25 m)	4.80 s	1.69 s	2.85 s	35 in (0.89 m)	9 ft 8 in (2.95 m)	19 reps
All values from NFL Combine/Pro Day

=== Cincinnati Bengals ===
Rucker was selected by the Cincinnati Bengals in the third round (91st overall) of the 2006 NFL draft. He was placed on the injured reserve list his rookie year in 2006.

In 2007, Rucker contributed on special teams and situational opportunities on defense. He started the final regular season game against the Miami Dolphins and finished with five tackles.

In 2008, Rucker started 4 games and played in 11 (both career highs). He finished with 24 total tackles, two forced fumbles, and a pass defensed.

In 2009, the Cincinnati Bengals won the AFC North and Rucker finished with 13 tackles, and an interception returned 26 yards.

In the 2010 season, Rucker had 17 tackles, a sack, and a pass defensed.

In 2011, Rucker had 44 tackles and four sacks. He also led all defensive ends in stops per snap percentage.

=== Cleveland Browns ===
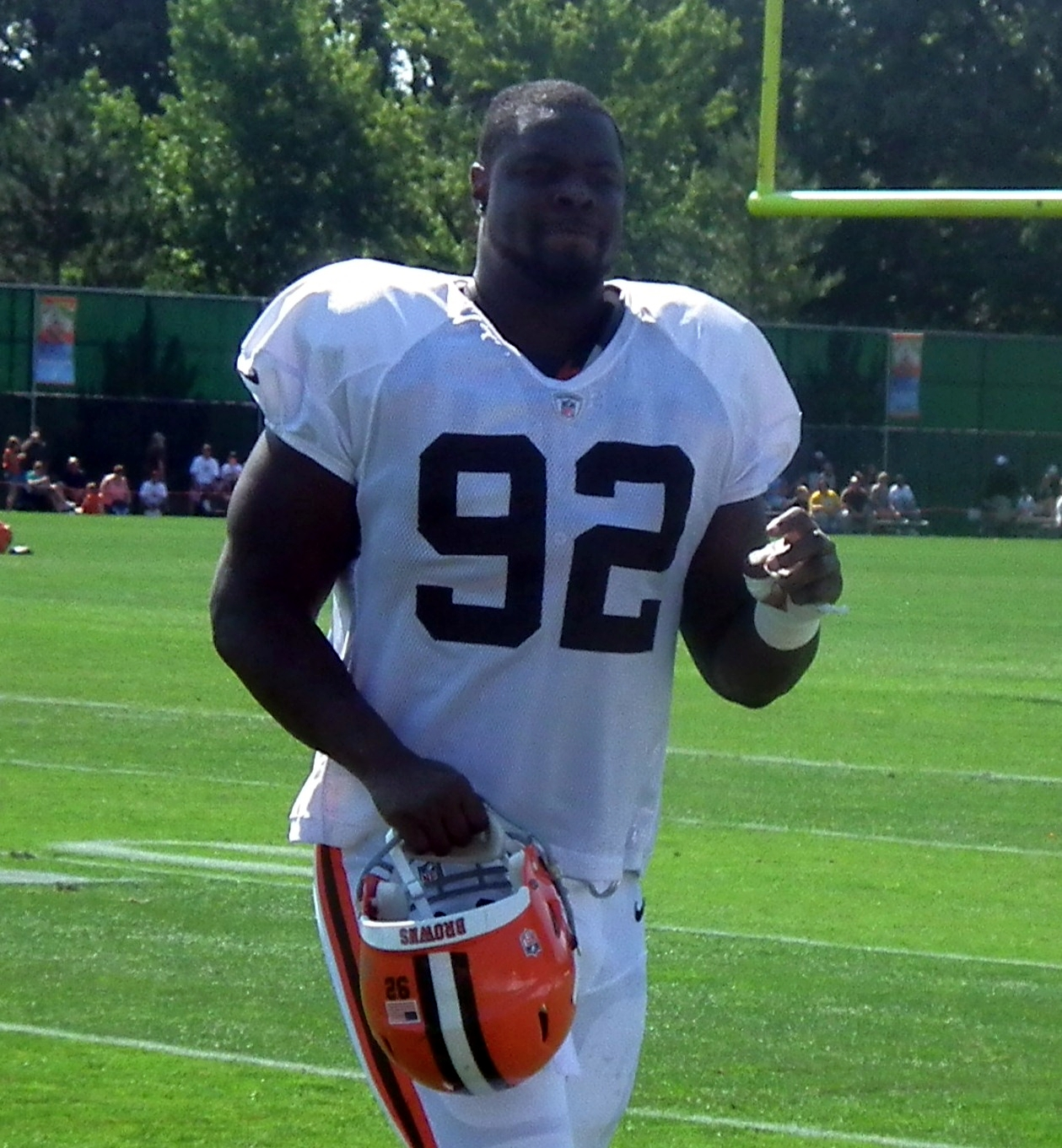
Rucker at Browns training camp in 2012.

Rucker signed with the Cleveland Browns on March 14, 2012. He was released during the 2013 offseason on February 5, 2013.

=== Arizona Cardinals ===
Rucker signed with the Arizona Cardinals on March 21, 2013.

On March 17, 2017, Rucker re-signed with the Cardinals.

On November 5, 2017, in Week 9 against the 49ers, Rucker was ejected after being involved in a fight with Carlos Hyde. On November 10, 2017, Rucker was fined $9,115 for his role in the fight.

=== Oakland Raiders ===
On June 12, 2018, Rucker signed with the Oakland Raiders.

== NFL career statistics ==
Legend
**Bold**	Career high

=== Regular season ===
Year	Team	Games		Tackles					Interceptions					Fumbles			
Year	Team	GP	GS	Cmb	Solo	Ast	Sck	TFL	Int	Yds	TD	Lng	PD	FF	FR	Yds	TD
2007	CIN	5	0	8	7	1	0.0	1	0	0	0	0	0	1	**1**	0	0
2008	CIN	11	4	23	15	8	1.0	4	0	0	0	0	1	**2**	**1**	**6**	0
2009	CIN	12	1	13	7	6	1.0	2	**1**	**26**	0	**26**	**2**	0	0	0	0
2010	CIN	9	3	17	8	9	1.0	2	0	0	0	0	1	0	0	0	0
2011	CIN	**16**	11	44	**32**	12	4.0	**11**	0	0	0	0	**2**	0	0	0	0
2012	CLE	**16**	**16**	**48**	29	**19**	4.0	4	0	0	0	0	1	1	0	0	0
2013	ARI	**16**	1	11	9	2	1.0	1	0	0	0	0	0	0	0	0	0
2014	ARI	15	7	24	20	4	**5.0**	9	0	0	0	0	1	**2**	0	0	0
2015	ARI	13	13	28	20	8	3.0	7	0	0	0	0	0	1	**1**	0	0
2016	ARI	13	1	13	7	6	0.0	2	0	0	0	0	1	1	0	0	0
2017	ARI	**16**	**16**	30	24	6	1.5	6	0	0	0	0	1	0	0	0	0
2018	OAK	15	15	37	23	14	0.0	2	0	0	0	0	**2**	0	0	0	0
		157	88	296	201	95	21.5	51	1	26	0	26	12	8	3	6	0

=== Playoffs ===
Year	Team	Games		Tackles					Interceptions					Fumbles			
Year	Team	GP	GS	Cmb	Solo	Ast	Sck	TFL	Int	Yds	TD	Lng	PD	FF	FR	Yds	TD
2009	CIN	1	0	2	1	1	0.0	0	0	0	0	0	0	0	0	0	0
2011	CIN	1	1	2	1	1	0.0	0	0	0	0	0	0	0	0	0	0
2014	ARI	1	1	4	**3**	1	0.0	**1**	0	0	0	0	0	0	0	0	0
2015	ARI	**2**	**2**	**6**	1	**5**	0.0	**1**	0	0	0	0	0	0	0	0	0
		5	4	14	6	8	0.0	2	0	0	0	0	0	0	0	0	0

== Personal life ==
Rucker was among a group of investors that placed a marijuana legalization initiative on the Ohio ballot in 2015. The initiative would have granted exclusive grow rights to Rucker and the other investors in the plan, but ultimately it was defeated.

In May 2023, Rucker joined Fortuna Investments as Vice President, working alongside Canadian investor Justus Grant Parmar.
