= Martin Rucker =

Martin Rucker may refer to:

- Martin T. Rucker (born 1957), member of the Missouri House of Representatives
- Martin Rucker (American football) (born 1985), American football tight end
