= Raker =

Raker or Rakers may refer to:

== Surnames ==
- Raker (surname), a surname
- Rakers, surname

== Characters ==
- Raker Qarrigat, a DC Comics alien
- Raker (Transformers), a fictional character

== Other uses ==
- North Raker, a mountain in Idaho
- Raker (saw), specialized saw teeth
- Raker Act, an act of the United States Congress

== See also ==
- Rake (disambiguation)
- Moonrakers
- Muckraker
