= Rekers =

Rekers is a surname. Notable people with the surname include:

- George Rekers (born 1948), American psychologist and minister
- Paul Rekers (1908–1987), American long-distance runner

== Organization(s) ==
- Rekers GmbH, a German company

== See also ==
- Ekers
- Rakers
