= Chris Chester =

Chris Chester may refer to:

- Chris Chester (American football) (born 1983), American football player
- Chris Chester (rugby league) (born 1978), English rugby league footballer
