= Rucker =

Rucker may refer to:

== Activities ==
- Loaded march, the practicing of which is also called rucking and the performer a rucker.

== People ==
- Rucker (surname)
- Ruckers, Flemish family of harpsichord makers

== Places ==
=== United States ===
- Rucker Park, street basketball court in Manhattan, New York City, New York
- Rucker, Missouri
- Rucker, Texas

== See also ==
- Ruck (disambiguation)
