= Racker =

Racker is a surname. Notable people with the surname include:

- Efraim Racker (1913–1991), Austrian biochemist
- Heinrich Racker (1910–1961), Polish-Argentine psychoanalyst

== See also ==
- Raker (surname)
- Rucker (surname)
