= Benton High School (Missouri) =

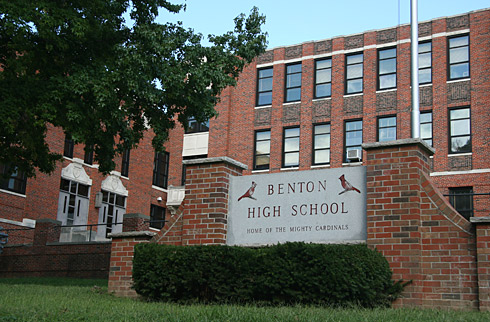

Location
- 5655 S 4th St; St. Joseph, Missouri 64504; United States

Information
- Founded: 1905
- School district: St. Joseph School District
- Principal: Lynn Davis
- Staff: 49.30 (on an FTE basis)
- Enrollment: 702 (2023–2024)
- Student to teacher ratio: 14.24
- Colors: Red and white
- Athletics conference: Midland Empire
- Team name: Cardinals
- Website: benton.sjsd.k12.mo.us

Benton High School is a school in St. Joseph, Missouri, United States. The public school teaches grades 9 through 12.

== History ==
In 1905, the St. Joseph, Missouri Board of Education charged J. A. Bell with establishing a high school in South St. Joseph. In September of that year, Benton High School opened its doors for the first time as the BOE rented a hall at the corner of King Hill and Colorado Avenues until a new building was to be completed. In November, students moved into those new buildings on the corner of Cumberland and Yale Streets. The school had four rooms that held grades one through 12.

In 1929, Benton became a junior-senior high school that offered courses from the 7th through the 12th grade.

In 1938, the BOE purchased a tract of land on 4th Street, overlooking the Saint Joseph, Missouri parkway system and built a new building there on March 21, 1940. The new building contained 37 classrooms, an auditorium, gymnasium, and cafeteria and was three stories high.

In 1961, a non-pillared dome gymnasium was constructed on the north side of the school and named in honor of P.B. "Pop" Springer, longtime coach and teacher at Benton. The dome collapsed from heavy snow in 1971 and was replaced. Many additions were made after 1969, including a two-story, twelve room wing with a spacious library and rooms for the math and social studies departments as well as an athletic field which was constructed in 1974 with an asphalt track and grandstands. Three years later the field was renamed "James Sparks Memorial Field" in honor of a Benton football player who lost his life during a game on the field earlier that season.

Benton currently enrolls between 700 and 900 students annually.

== Athletics ==
=== Football ===
The football team won the Class 4 District 16 championship from 2004–2007. They have made the quarterfinals in 2005 and 2006 and the semifinals in 2004. They also have made one appearance in the Missouri state championship in 1991 after defeating Webb City 14–0 in a game now known as the mud bowl.

=== Basketball ===
The girls basketball team won the Class 4 District 16 Title in 2006. The boys basketball team made it to the quarterfinals. The girls basketball team won the state championship going undefeated throughout the '06 season, compiling a 30–0 record. The 2015–2016 Lady Cardinals had a record of 31–0 and won the Missouri 4A state championship, and are now ranked #1 in 4A and in the state.

=== Baseball ===
The Benton Baseball team has been successful over the past few years. From 2005–2007, the Benton squad, under the coaching of Mike Musser, has composed a 61–7 record. These teams include a 23–3 4th place team in 2005, a 24–1 2006 team who went undefeated during the regular season, however falling in the district championship game, and in 2007 a 24–3 state championship team. In 2024, the team went to the state championship where they fell 2-7 to Blair Oaks (Jefferson City) after a record 32-4 season. In the same stretch, Benton produced multiple division 1 baseball prospects, such as Kyle Heim (Iowa), Ryan Hook (Western Kentucky), Wes Miller (Missouri State), and Johnny Coy (Arizona State and Wichita State)

=== Tennis ===
The Benton tennis team also experienced success from 2007–2009. The Benton team posted a 10–1 record in 2008. They became the first Benton team to win districts in over 15 years, finally losing in the quarterfinals of state to St. Pius X.

== Notable alumni ==
- Wes Barnett '88 - Olympic weightlifter for the United States
- Mike Rucker '94 -Former Defensive end for the Carolina Panthers
- Martin Rucker '03 - Tight end for the Dallas Cowboys
- Jim Wright - Pitcher for the Kansas City Royals

== Statistics ==
- Total Students: 827
- Student/Teacher Ratio: 14.34 Students : 1 Teacher
- Graduation Rate - 92%
- Average ACT Score - 19.4
- Suspensions of Ten or More Consecutive Days: 20
- Students Eligible for Free or Reduced-Price Lunch - 544 Students/66%
- Enrollment by Race/Ethnicity (Number/Percent)
  - American Indian/Alaskan: 6 Students
  - Asian/Pacific Islander: 2 Students
  - Black: 61 Students
  - Hispanic: 47 Students
  - White: 704 Students
  - Two or More Races: 7 Students
- Enrollment by Grade
  - 9th Grade: 205 Students
  - 10th Grade: 236 Students
  - 11th Grade: 224 Students
  - 12th Grade: 162 Students
- Enrollment by Gender
  - Male: 437 Students
  - Female: 390 Students
