= Rakers =

Rakers is a surname. Notable people with the surname include:

- Aaron Rakers (born 1977), American baseball pitcher
- Jason Rakers (born 1973), American baseball player
- Judith Rakers (born 1976), German television presenter

== See also ==
- Raker (disambiguation)
- Rekers
- The Rakers
