= Raker (surname) =

Raker is a surname. Notable people with the surname include:

- Irma S. Raker (born 1938), American lawyer
- John E. Raker (1863–1926), American lawyer and politician

== See also ==
- Baker (surname)
- Maker (surname)
- Racker
- Rakers
