= Tustin High School =

Public secondary school in Tustin, California, United States

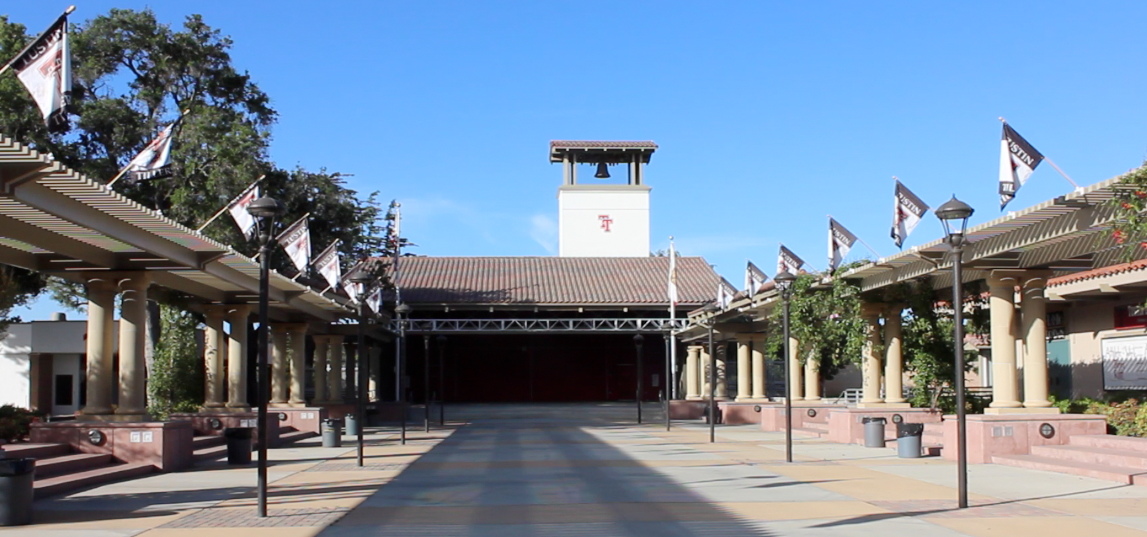

Location
- 1171 El Camino Real; Tustin, CA 92780-4660; United States; 33.73726°N 117.818509°W

Information
- Former name: Tustin Union High School
- School type: Public high school
- Established: 1921
- Status: Open
- School district: Tustin Unified
- NCES District ID: 0640150
- Local authority: TUSD Board of Education
- Superintendent: Mark Johnson
- School code: CA-3073643-3037553
- CEEB code: 053570
- NCES School ID: 064015006647
- Principal: Heather Bojorquez
- Teaching staff: 67.99
- Grades: 9–12
- Gender: Coeducational
- Enrollment: 1,627 (2024–2025)
- Student to teacher ratio: 23.93
- Campus size: 29 acres (12 ha)
- Campus type: Suburban
- Colors: White Black; Red
- Slogan: A History of Excellence – A Future of Promise
- Athletics conference: Golden West League
- Mascot: Tommy the Tiller
- Nickname: Tillers
- Rival: Foothill High School
- USNWR ranking: 3,054
- Publication: Tiller News Today
- Yearbook: Tustin Audion
- Website: ths.tustin.k12.ca.us

Tustin High School is a public high school in Tustin, California, United States. It is part of the Tustin Unified School District. It was established in 1921 as the Tustin Union High School.

== History ==
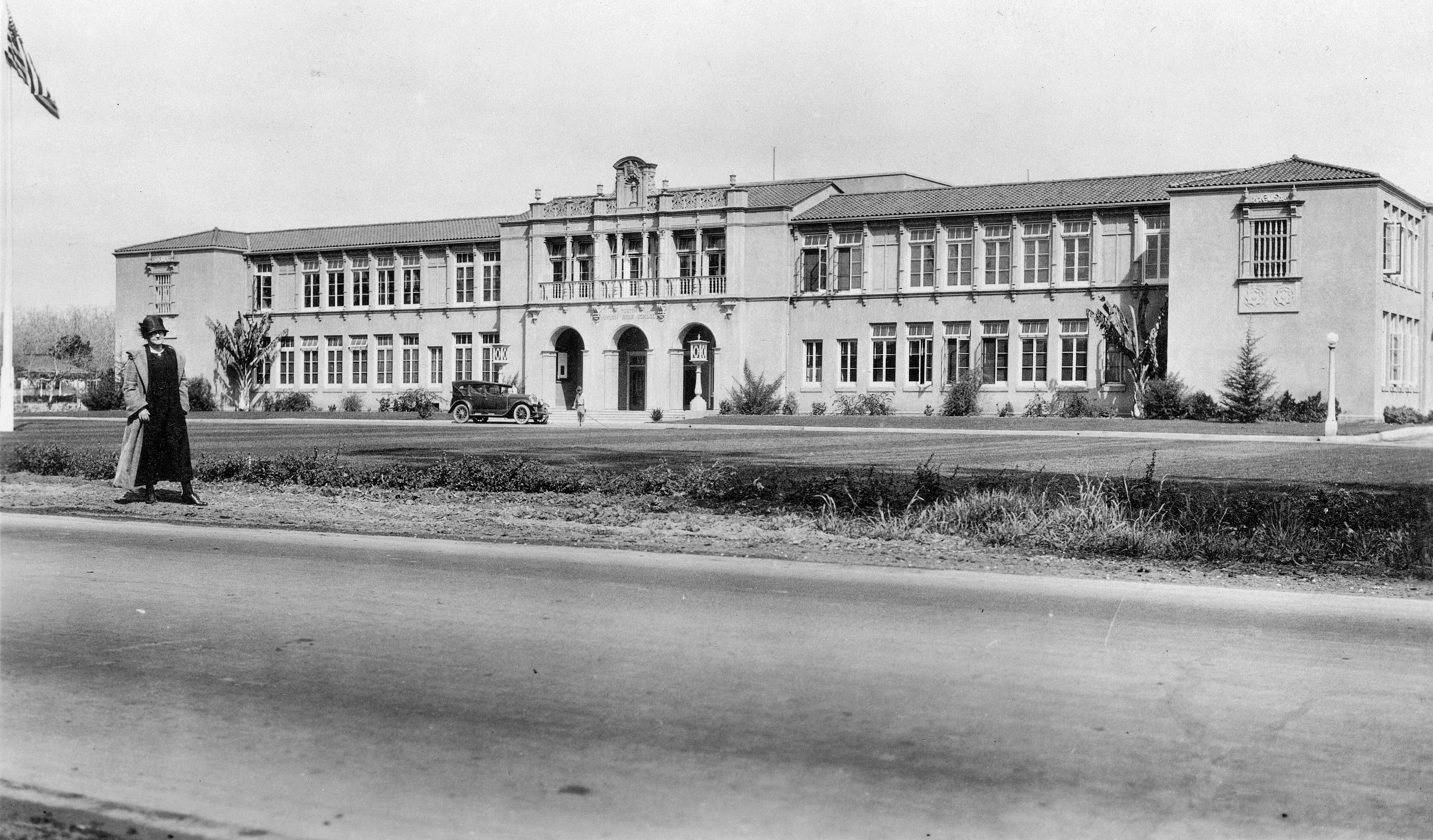
Tustin High School, circa 1925

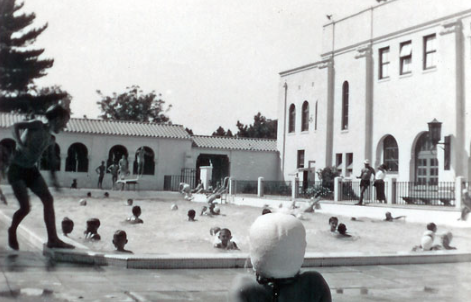
The Tustin Union High School pool, circa 1956

Founded in 1921, Tustin High School was originally meant to serve five elementary districts: Tustin, Laguna Beach, El Toro, Trabuco Canyon, and San Joaquin. Their mascot, the "Tiller", was inspired by the agribusinesses that originally surrounded the school.

In 1972, the Tustin Union High School District merged with Tustin Elementary School District to create the Tustin Unified School District.

In 2015, Tustin was recognized as a California Gold Ribbon School for its academics, school environment, and learning center.

== Curriculum ==
Tustin High School's academic programs include many AP courses, honors courses, and STEM courses, alongside high school college-prep courses.

=== STEM ===
The Tustin High School Technology & Engineering Academy ("T-Tech"), is a four-year program focused on STEM fields, as guided by PLTW (Project Lead the Way). Tustin started the academy in 2010. The class of 2015 was its first "complete" class.

== Athletics ==
The Tillers currently compete in the Golden West League of the CIF Southern Section (CIF-SS), a part of the California Interscholastic Federation (CIF).

=== Seasons ===
Tustin High School fields 26 teams in 16 different sports.

Fall:

- Cheer
- Cross country (men's/women's)
- Football
- Golf (women's)
- Tennis (women's)
- Volleyball (women's)
- Water polo (men's)

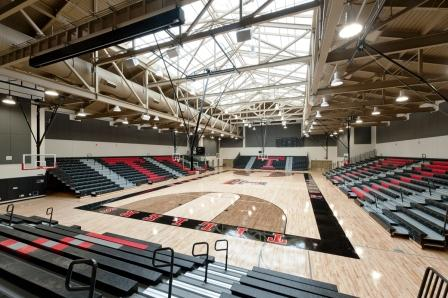
Tustin High Sports Pavilion - interior

Winter:

- Basketball (men's/women's)
- Soccer (men's/women's)
- Water polo (women's)
- Wrestling (men's/women's)

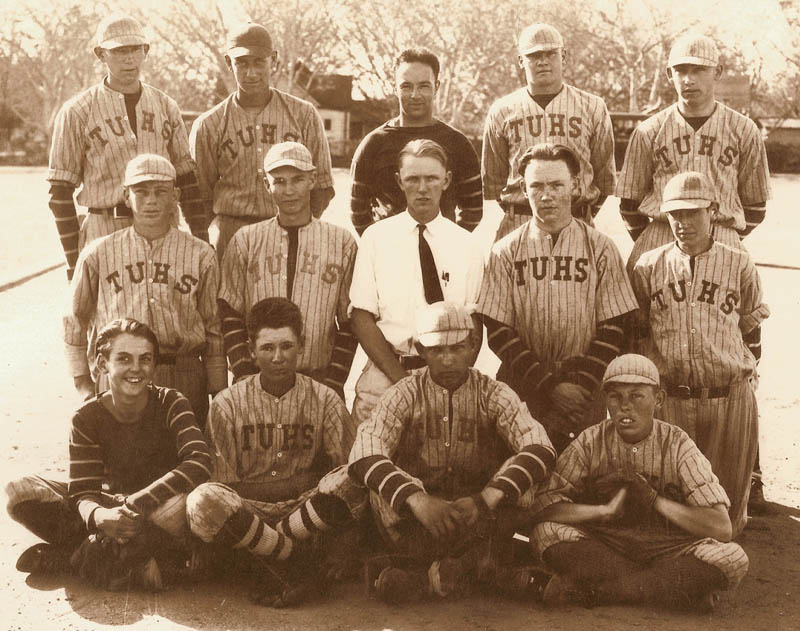
Tustin Union High School - 1926 Baseball team

Spring:

- Baseball
- Golf (men's)
- Lacrosse (men's/women's)
- Softball
- Swimming (men's/women's)
- Tennis (men's)
- Track and field (men's/women's)
- Volleyball (men's)

==== Football ====
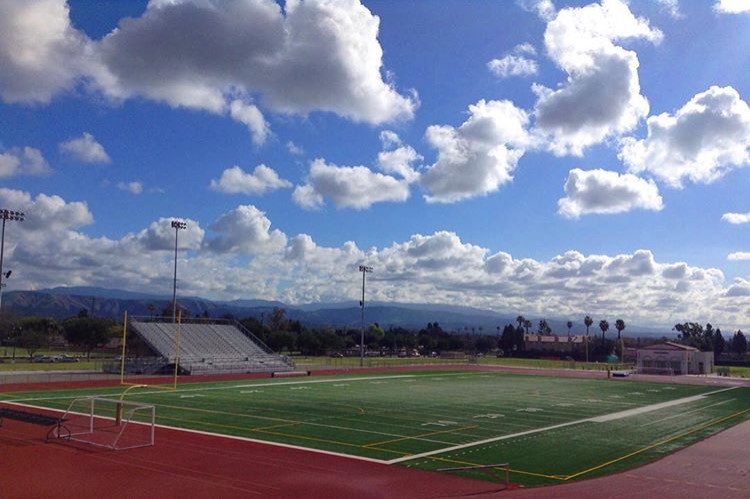
Northrup Field at Tustin High School

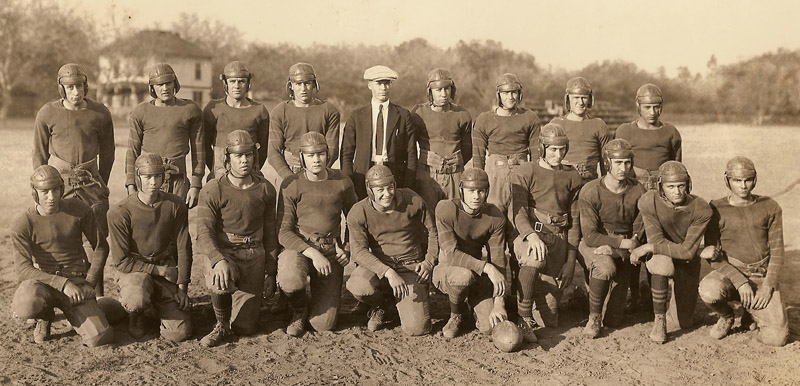
Tustin Union High School's 1924 football team

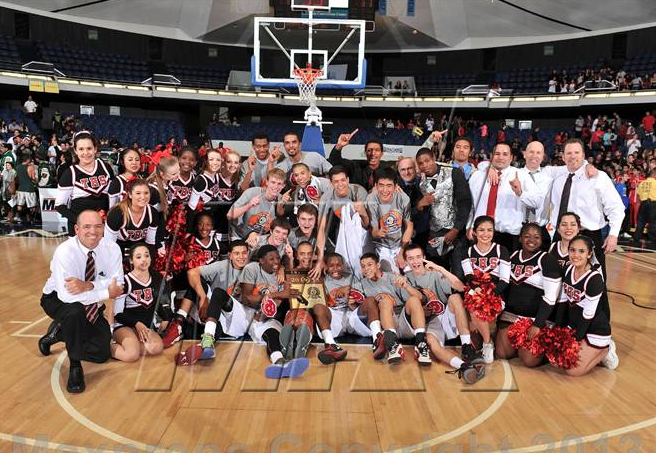
Tustin High School basketball are CIF-SS Division 3AAA champions

In 2008, Tustin High School and Dillard high school had six players in the NFL, which was the most in the United States at the time. These players were Sam Baker (Atlanta), Beau Bell (American football) (Cleveland), Chris Chester (Baltimore), DeShaun Foster (San Francisco), Matt McCoy (Tampa Bay), and Frostee Rucker (Cincinnati). The totals were based on the 1,693-man 2008 NFL Kickoff Weekend rosters (September 4, 7–8).

Since 1996, Tustin has won 10 league titles and has gone to 10 CIF semi-finals and four finals appearances (1997, 2008, 2010, 2011).

On December 10, 2011, Tustin defeated the El Toro Chargers in the CIF-SS Southwest Division championship game at Anaheim Stadium, their first CIF Championship since 1948.

Since the school's rivalry started with Foothill High School in 1966, Tustin trails with a record of 23-29-1.

As part of the National Football League Super Bowl High School Honor Roll Program, Tustin High was awarded a Golden Football for its impact on Super Bowl history. The program recognizes each high school, with alumni participating or playing in a Super Bowl. DeShaun Foster, a running back for THS from 1994 to 1998, participated in Super Bowl XXXVIII with the Carolina Panthers in 2004. In 2013, Kim Robinson, an English teacher at Tustin High, published For Underdogs Only, detailing the life of long-time football coach, Myron Miller.

==== Men's basketball ====
The Tiller men's basketball team is the reigning Empire League champions (2015), with a league record of 10–0. They have won the league title in three of the past four years (2012, 2013, and 2015). During the 2012–13 season, the team set a school record for season wins with 31 (31-3 record). That same season, the Tillers defeated Royal High School (California) in the Division 3AAA finals, with their final ranking being 27th in California and 167th in the nation. The following season (2014), after being raised to Division 2A, the team made it to the semi-finals, only to be defeated by Calabasas High School 56–49. For the 2014–2015 season, again being raised to Division 1A, the team pushed far into the postseason, reaching the semi-finals again, but being defeated by Village Christian Schools (the eventual champions) 58–44. The team has also qualified for the state playoffs twice, in the 2012–2013 season, when they made it to the second round (D. III), and the 2013–2014 season, losing in the first round (D. II).

=== School championships ===
	League championships	O.C. / SoCal / CIF-SS championships	State championships
Baseball	1971, 1983, 1986, 1989, 1990, 1992, 1994, 1995, 2002	1938, 1990*, 1993	
Basketball (men's)	1961, 1962, 1968, 1981, 1991, 1992, 1994, 1995, 1996, 2012, 2013, 2015	1937, 1941, 1981*, 1991, 1995*, 2013	1991
Basketball (women's)	1987, 1989, 1990, 1991, 1992, 1997, 2015	1992*	
Cross country (men's)	1960, 1961, 1966, 1986, 1993, 1995, 1996, 2002	1964*, 1983, 1984, 1990*, 1996	1983, 1996*
Cross country (women's)	1981, 1984, 1983, 1990, 1991, 1996		
Football	1937, 1938, 1939, 1940, 1942, 1943, 1944, 1948, 1949, 1950, 1987, 1988, 1989, 1990, 1991, 1997, 1998, 1999, 2000, 2002, 2008, 2009, 2010, 2011, 2012	1948, 1990*, 1991*, 1997*, 2008*, 2010*, 2011	
Golf (men's)	2001		
Golf (women's)
Gymnastics**		1985*	
Lacrosse (men's)
Lacrosse (women's)
Soccer (men's)	2019, 2020		
Soccer (women's)
Softball	1976, 1977, 1978, 1980, 1981, 1988, 1989, 2000, 2001, 2002		
Swimming (men's)	1981, 1992, 1999, 2000, 2001, 2002, 2004	1932	
Swimming (women's)	1975, 1976, 2000, 2001, 2002		
Tennis (men's)
Tennis (women's)
Track and field (men's)	1940, 1941, 1944, 1957, 1958, 1960, 1961, 1995, 1996, 1997, 1998, 1999, 2000, 2001, 2002	1997, 2001	
Track and field (women's)	1985		
Volleyball (men's)	1995, 1996, 1997, 1998, 2000, 2001, 2002, 2003, 2004, 2014, 2015, 2018	1995, 1998*	
Volleyball (women's)	1994		
Water polo (men's)	1999, 2001, 2002, 2011	1982	
Water polo (women's)	2000, 2001, 2002, 2006		
Wrestling	1970, 1971, 1976, 1977, 1989		

**No longer a sport offered
*Finalist / runner-up

== Campus ==
Tustin High School is located on 29 acres (12 ha) of land in central Tustin.

It is the oldest school in the district. The original layout of the school included a neoclassical building with a 1,000-seat auditorium, an outdoor Greek theatre, a domestic science department, a mechanical and manual training department, an athletic field, and a gymnasium (opened in 1924). In 1927, the school added a new wing containing a large gymnasium and swimming pool.

The football stadium was constructed in the mid-1940s. The stadium and field were later named Northrup Field after Orville Northrup, who taught woodshop and physical education, and served as Principal of Tustin Union High School from 1941 to 1962.

The original building was judged unsafe in case of an earthquake and demolished in June 1966. The old building was replaced with a new building.

In June 2008, the Tustin School Board approved a master plan that would guide the possible renovations of Tustin High School or the construction of a new campus. The plan would include a new administration building, a 2-story science centre, a sports pavilion, and a two-story performing arts theatre and classroom building. The estimated cost of the renovation was approximately $150 million.

The sports pavilion was finished in 2012, costing $22 million. It seats 2,500 students and faculty within 29,000 square feet of space. Amenities include ticket windows, concession stands, foyer, dance room, trophy cases, men's and women's team rooms equipped with smart boards, two professionally sized scoreboards, and a drop-down display screen. The new facility houses four-sided bleachers and can be formatted as three basketball or volleyball practice courts (width-wise), a college-sized basketball court, or a main volleyball court (length-wise).

In December 2012, reconstruction at Northrup Stadium and the swimming complex began. The updated stadium includes a synthetic field, nine-lane synthetic track, concessions building, a 1,000-seat visitor bleacher, and a 1,000-seat home bleacher. The new $1.7 million swimming complex includes an Olympic-sized pool, new scoreboard, bleachers, and renovated locker rooms.

In February 2016, Tustin High broke ground on a new humanities building, housing English and language courses. The project is scheduled to be finished for the 2016–2017 school year.

The current campus consists of 22 single-story buildings, a two-story science building, and 17 portable classrooms. The campus includes two baseball fields, two softball fields, a discus field, and two gymnasiums. It also houses the District football field, an Olympic-sized swimming pool, two soccer fields, six tennis courts, and a synthetic field.

== January 21 Incident ==
On January 21, 2023, two students engaged in a fight, one of the students injuring a student with a knife. The school implemented a temporary shelter-in-place protocol. The injured student was sent to a local hospital for additional medical attention.

== Notable alumni ==
=== Athletics ===
- Sam Baker (1985–), NFL offensive tackle for Atlanta Falcons; selected in 2008 NFL draft, Round 1, Pick 21
- Beau Bell (1986–), linebacker for Cleveland Browns; played in Canadian Football League and for arena football's Philadelphia Soul; selected in 2008 NFL draft, Round 4, Pick 104
- Heath Bell (1977–), three-time MLB All-Star pitcher; last played for Tampa Bay Rays
- Milorad Čavić (1984–), Serbian Olympic freestyle and butterfly swimmer; set eight school and four state records while winning seven CIF state titles; 2002 National High School Swimmer of the Year; 2008 Summer Olympics silver medalist, 100m butterfly, famously falling to Michael Phelps by 1/100 of a second
- Chris Chester (1983–), NFL lineman for Atlanta Falcons, Baltimore Ravens; selected in 2006 NFL draft, Round 2, Pick 56
- DeShaun Foster (1980–), running back for UCLA and NFL's Carolina Panthers and San Francisco 49ers; selected in 2002 NFL draft, Round 2, Pick 34; currently head coach at UCLA
- Evelyn Furtsch (1914–2015), Olympic gold medalist for 4x100 relay at 1932 Summer Olympics, time of 46.9 seconds; with her teammates, held world record for four years (until it was broken by Germany at 1936 Summer Olympics); first Olympic champion in athletics and first female American gold medalist to live to age 100; died on March 5, 2015, at age 100 years, 10 months
- Doug Gottlieb (1976–), host of The Doug Gottlieb Show; NCAA collegiate basketball player
- Mark Grace (1964–), MLB All-Star first baseman for Chicago Cubs; broadcaster and coach
- Shawn Green (1972–), MLB 2x All-Star outfielder and designated hitter for Toronto Blue Jays, Los Angeles Dodgers, Arizona Diamondbacks, and New York Mets
- Nick Hornsby (1995–), basketball player for Hapoel Be'er Sheva in the Israeli Basketball Premier League
- Matt McCoy (1982–), NFL linebacker for Seattle Seahawks; selected in 2005 NFL draft, Round 2, Pick 63
- Rick Partridge (1957–), NFL punter for New Orleans Saints, San Diego Chargers and Buffalo Bills
- Frostee Rucker (1983–), NFL defensive end for several teams, including the Cincinnati Bengals, Cleveland Browns, Arizona Cardinals and Oakland Raiders; selected in 2006 NFL draft, Round 3, Pick 91 out of USC
- Mike Schwabe (1964–), MLB pitcher for the Detroit Tigers
- T. J. Shorts (1997–), EuroCup Basketball MVP and Finals MVP, currently plays for Paris Basketball
- Dave Staton (1968–), MLB first baseman for the San Diego Padres
- Jim Steffen (1936–2015), NFL safety for Detroit Lions and Washington Redskins; selected in 1959 NFL Draft, Round 13, Pick 149
- Richard Umphrey III (1958–), NFL center for San Diego Chargers and New York Giants; selected in 1982 NFL Draft, Round 5, Pick 129
- Ameer Webb (1991–), sprinter, 200 meter national champion at 2013 NCAA Indoor and NCAA Men's Division I Outdoor Track and Field Championships; competed at 2016 Summer Olympics in Rio de Janeiro

=== Film ===
- Eva Angelina (1985–), adult film actress; attended Tustin but graduated from Foothill High School
- Cuba Gooding, Jr. (1968–), actor, won Academy Award for Best Supporting Actor for role as Rod Tidwell in Jerry Maguire; also appeared in The Butler, Selma and many other films; attended THS but graduated elsewhere
- Robert David Hall (1947–), actor, best known for his work on CSI: Crime Scene Investigation as Dr. Al Robbins; where he acted for 326 episodes; also appeared in Starship Troopers and The Negotiator
- Rachel Kimsey (1978–), actress, The Young and the Restless
- Kim Krizan (1961–), writer, best known for her series Before Sunrise and Before Sunset

=== Musicians ===
- Tony Scalzo, frontman of Fastball

=== Business ===
- Julie Sweet, CEO of Accenture

=== Miscellaneous ===
- Dan Choi (1981–), US Army officer, activist against the US military's Don't Ask, Don't Tell policy
- William Drenttel (1953–2013), designer, author, publisher, and social entrepreneur
- David C. Leestma (1949–), astronaut and former director of flight crew operations at the Johnson Space Center
