= Rich Umphrey =

American football player (born 1958)

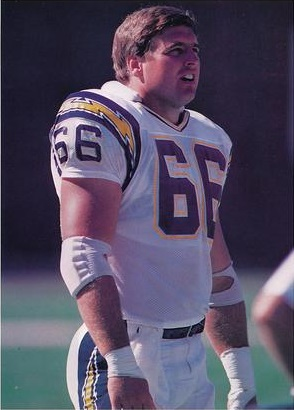
- Umphrey c. 1985

No. 59, 66
- Position: Center

Personal information
- Born: December 13, 1958 (age 67); Garden Grove, California, U.S.
- Listed height: 6 ft 3 in (1.91 m)
- Listed weight: 263 lb (119 kg)

Career information
- High school: Tustin (Tustin, California)
- College: Colorado
- NFL draft: 1982: 5th round, 129th overall pick

Career history
- New York Giants (1982–1984); San Diego Chargers (1985)

Awards and highlights
- PFWA All-Rookie Team (1982)

Career NFL statistics
- Games played: 45
- Games started: 18
- Fumble recoveries: 2
- Stats at Pro Football Reference

Richard Vernon Umphrey III (born December 13, 1958) is an American former professional football player who was an offensive lineman in the National Football League (NFL). He played professionally in the National Football League (NFL) for the New York Giants (1982–1984) and the San Diego Chargers (1985). He graduated from Tustin High School in Tustin, California and went on to play at the University of Colorado at Boulder. He was selected in the fifth round of the 1982 NFL draft by the New York Giants as the starting center. He played three seasons for the Giants before being traded in 1985 to the San Diego Chargers.

He is married to Jackie and father to Justin and Noel Umphrey, a water polo player for UCLA.
