= Martin T. Rucker =

American politician

Martin T. Rucker (born June 15, 1957) is a former a Democratic member of the Missouri House of Representatives.

== Biography ==
Rucker is a graduate of St. Joseph Central High School. He went on to study at Central Wyoming College in Riverton, Wyoming, and Missouri Western State University.

He was first elected to the Missouri House of Representatives in 2004. He served as Deputy Whip of the Black Caucus and Rural Caucus. He was also a member on the Special Committee on Education Funding, as well as the standing committees on Agriculture Policy, Appropriations - Education, and Senior Citizen Advocacy.

In 2010, he was an unsuccessful candidate for the Missouri Senate. He currently serves as a member on the Missouri Probation and Parole Board.

He is currently a member of the Board of Trustees of Trinity Missionary Full Gospel Church, a former member of the St. Joseph School Board of Education, the United Way Board of Directors, and the Inter-Serv Board of Directors.

His sons Mike Rucker and Martin Rucker were professional football players in the NFL. In 2016, his son Martin Rucker announced his candidacy for the Missouri Senate.
