= Matt McCoy (American football) =

American football player (born 1982)

No. 51, 59, 50, 52
- Position: Linebacker

Personal information
- Born: October 14, 1982 (age 44); Tustin, California, U.S.
- Listed height: 6 ft 0 in (1.83 m)
- Listed weight: 232 lb (105 kg)

Career information
- High school: Tustin
- College: San Diego State
- NFL draft: 2005: 2nd round, 63rd overall pick

Career history
- Philadelphia Eagles (2005–2007); New Orleans Saints (2007); Tampa Bay Buccaneers (2008–2009); Seattle Seahawks (2010–2011)

Awards and highlights
- 2× Second-team All-MW (2003, 2004)

Career NFL statistics
- Total tackles: 136
- Sacks: 2
- Forced fumbles: 4
- Stats at Pro Football Reference

Matthew Garrett McCoy (born October 14, 1982) is an American former professional football player who was a linebacker in the National Football League (NFL). He played college football for the San Diego State Aztecs and was selected by the Philadelphia Eagles in the second round of the 2005 NFL draft.

McCoy also played for the New Orleans Saints, Tampa Bay Buccaneers and Seattle Seahawks.

== Early life ==
McCoy attended Tustin High School in Tustin, California. He set the school record for quarterback sacks with 18.5 sacks as a junior. As a senior, he broke his own record with 23 sacks and was named "High School Defensive Player of the Year" by the Orange County Register.

== College career ==
McCoy played college football at San Diego State University where he won All-Mountain West Conference honors. He finished his career with eight sacks, 270 tackles (26.5 for losses), four forced fumbles, three fumble recoveries, four pass deflections, and a blocked kick.

== Professional career ==
=== Philadelphia Eagles ===
McCoy was selected by the Philadelphia Eagles in the second round of the 2005 NFL draft with the 63rd overall pick. He was selected as a project linebacker whom Eagles personnel felt they could develop. McCoy was expected to contribute to special teams, but did not contribute in his rookie season. Going into 2006, he was named the weakside linebacker starter by defensive coordinator Jim Johnson. Initially he had been praised as having great speed, sideline to sideline pursuit abilities and a high motor, as well as described as a "ball hawk". He had an injured shoulder later in the year that prevented him from playing as well as he had during the first 6 weeks of the season, and ultimately led to his benching in favor of rookie Omar Gaither. Matt McCoy finished the season with 66 tackles, 2 sacks, 3 forces fumbles, and 5 tackles for loss.

At the beginning of the 2007 season, McCoy was listed as a back-up linebacker and a starter on special team kickoffs. In the team's Week 8 game against the Minnesota Vikings, McCoy was flagged for unnecessary roughness after a late hit on punter Chris Kluwe. The following day, he was cut in favor of practice squad linebacker Akeem Jordan. When asked about the penalty's effect on the transaction, head coach Andy Reid said Jordan was more the reason for the move.

=== New Orleans Saints ===
After being let go by the Eagles, McCoy was signed by the New Orleans Saints on November 3, 2007. He appeared in four games with the team, recording two solo tackles.

McCoy was not tendered a contract by the team as a restricted free agent the following off-season, making him an unrestricted free agent.

=== Tampa Bay Buccaneers ===
On March 4, 2008, McCoy signed with the Tampa Bay Buccaneers.

After being inactive for the 2009 regular season opener, McCoy recorded one tackle against the Buffalo Bills on September 20. He was released by the Buccaneers on September 26 when wide receiver Mario Urrutia was promoted from the practice squad. He was re-signed on September 29, when Urrutia was waived. McCoy was released again on October 13, to make room for newly signed wide receiver Yamon Figurs. He was re-signed on November 11.

=== Seattle Seahawks ===
On March 16, 2010, McCoy signed with the Seattle Seahawks.
