= DeShaun Foster =

American football player and coach (born 1980)

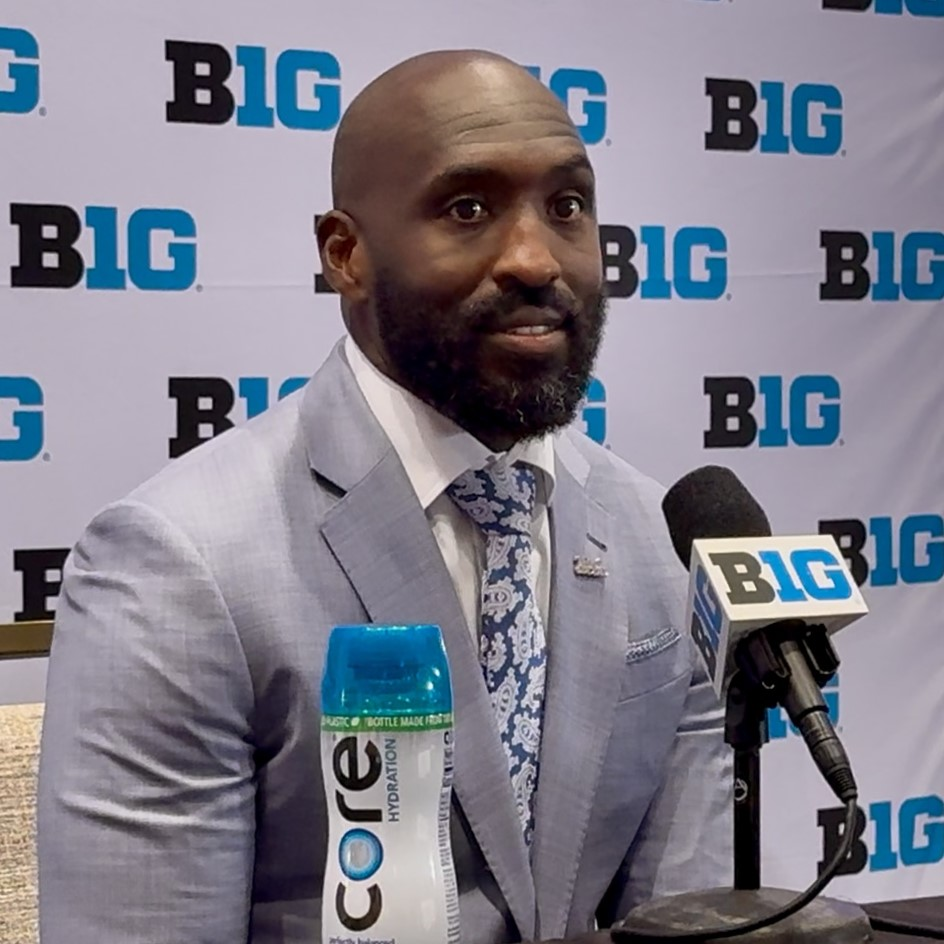
- Foster in 2025

Personal information
- Born: January 10, 1980 (age 46); Charlotte, North Carolina, U.S.
- Listed height: 6 ft 0 in (1.83 m)
- Listed weight: 222 lb (101 kg)

Career information
- Position: Running back (No. 20, 26, 29)
- High school: Tustin (Tustin, California)
- College: UCLA (1998–2001)
- NFL draft: 2002: 2nd round, 34th overall pick

Career history

Playing
- Carolina Panthers (2002–2007); San Francisco 49ers (2008)

Coaching
- UCLA (2012–2014); Student assistant (2012-2013); Graduate assistant (2014); Texas Tech (2016) Running backs coach; UCLA (2017–2025); Running backs coach (2017-2022); Associate head coach & running backs coach (2023); Head coach (2024-2025)

Operations
- UCLA (2015) Director of player development and high school relations

Awards and highlights
- Second-team All-American (2001); 2× First-team All-Pac-10 (2000, 2001)

Career NFL statistics
- Rushing yards: 3,570
- Rushing average: 3.9
- Rushing touchdowns: 11
- Receptions: 142
- Receiving yards: 1,129
- Receiving touchdowns: 5
- Stats at Pro Football Reference

Head coaching record
- Career: 5–10 (.333) (NCAA)

DeShaun Xavier Foster (born January 10, 1980) is an American college football coach and former player who most recently served as the head coach of the UCLA Bruins from 2024 to 2025. He played professionally as a running back for six seasons in the National Football League (NFL). Foster played collegiately for UCLA, earning All-American honors in 2001. He is a member of the UCLA Athletics Hall of Fame.

Foster was selected by the Carolina Panthers in the second round of the 2002 NFL draft. He played five seasons for the Panthers and one for the San Francisco 49ers. He became a coach, serving as an assistant coach for the Texas Tech Red Raiders and UCLA. The Bruins promoted him to head coach in 2024, but he was fired shortly after the start of his second season in 2025.

== Early life ==
Foster was born in Charlotte, North Carolina. Although he and his family moved to Tustin, California, when he was one year old, Foster continued to visit relatives in Charlotte regularly as a child. He attended Tustin High School and lettered three times each in football and basketball, and four times in track. As a senior in 1997, he was named the USA Today California Player of the Year and finished the year rushing for 3,998 yards and scoring a state single-season record 59 touchdowns on a Tustin football team that finished runner-up in the state championship against a Santa Margarita Catholic High School team with quarterback Carson Palmer. For his career, he rushed for a total of 5,885 yards.

== Playing career ==
=== College ===
Foster played football at the University of California, Los Angeles (UCLA), where he set a team rushing record for true freshmen with 673 yards and 10 touchdowns on 126 carries in 11 games. The next year, he spent mostly on the bench with an ankle sprain, but still managed to record 375 yards and 6 scores on 111 carries. As a junior, he led the Bruins with 1,037 yards, while scoring 13 touchdowns. In his final year in 2001, Foster posted 1,109 yards with 12 touchdowns; he had six games of over 100 rushing yards. He set a school record with a 301-yard game against Washington, and tied a record with four touchdowns (both records since broken by Maurice Jones-Drew). He was named a second-team All-American by The Sporting News. He ended his college career in the team top 10 in touchdowns, rushing yards, and points scored.

=== National Football League ===
Pre-draft measurables
Height	Weight	40-yard dash	10-yard split	20-yard split	20-yard shuttle	Three-cone drill	Vertical jump	Broad jump	Bench press
6 ft 0 5/8 in (1.84 m)	222 lb (101 kg)	4.59 s	1.62 s	2.69 s	4.16 s	6.82 s	35.5 in (0.90 m)	9 ft 11 in (3.02 m)	20 reps
All values from NFL Combine

==== Carolina Panthers ====
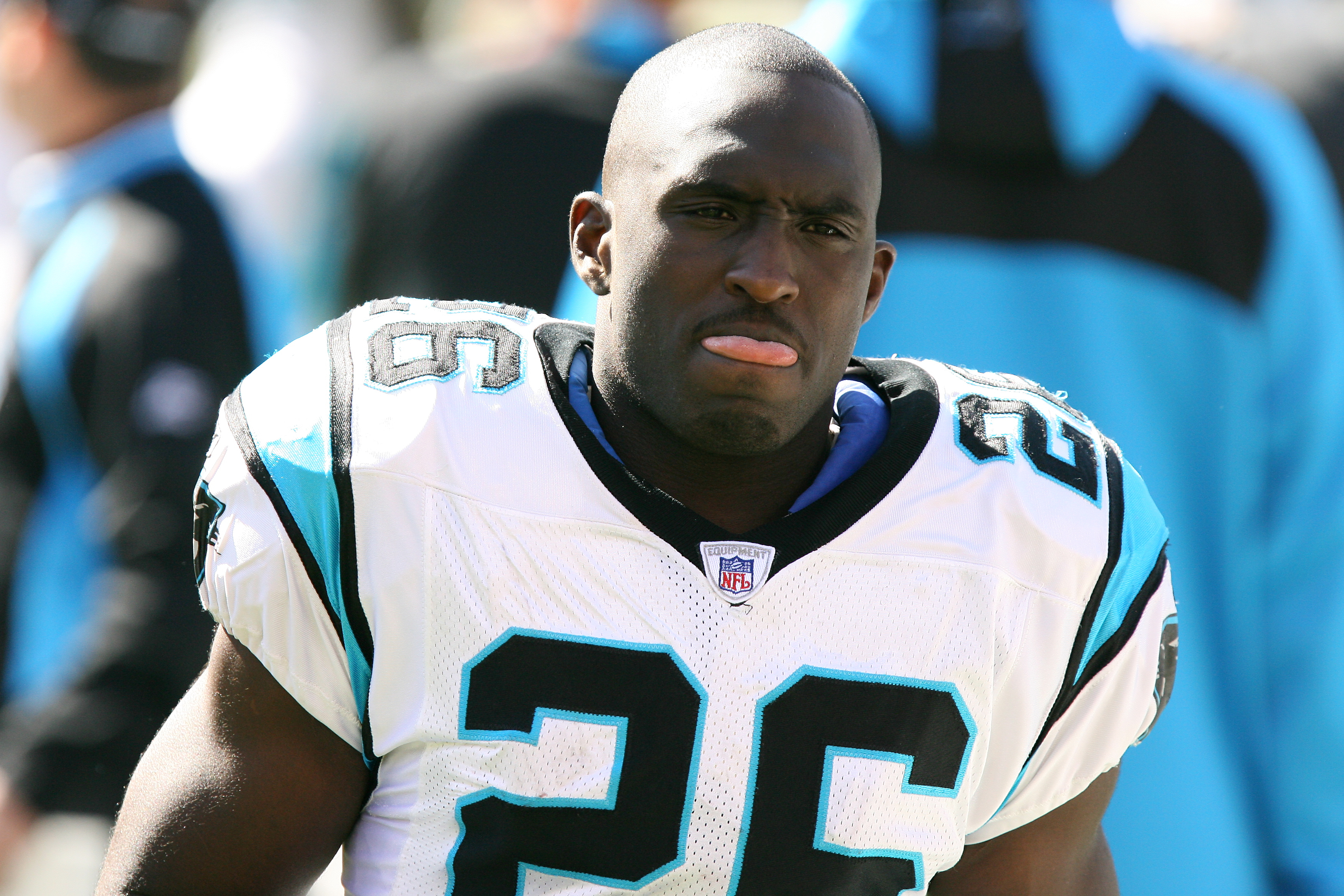
Foster in 2006 with the Carolina Panthers.

Foster was chosen in the second round (34th overall) of the 2002 NFL draft. He had a promising preseason, but was injured in a game against the New England Patriots, and sat out the remainder of the season on injured reserve. However, he returned the following season as a complement to Stephen Davis; whose bruising style matched well with Foster's speed. Foster finished the regular season with 113 carries for 429 yards. However, his best performances came in the 2003-04 playoffs. He had a memorable run in the NFC Championship Game against the Philadelphia Eagles, where he broke four tackles on a one-yard run to score, giving the Panthers a 14–3 lead. In Super Bowl XXXVIII against the Patriots, Foster scored on a 33-yard run that stands as the fifth-longest touchdown run in Super Bowl history. The following season looked promising for the Panthers, but many of the starters suffered season-ending injuries, and Foster was no exception. He broke his clavicle in a game against the Denver Broncos. He returned the following season (2005) and surpassed Davis as the Panthers' starter. He led the team in yardage and carries, helping the Panthers to an 11–5 record. In a 23–0 wild card victory over the New York Giants, Foster set franchise records for carries (27), yards (151) and average (5.59) in a playoff game, but suffered a broken ankle in a playoff game against the Chicago Bears that left him out for the remainder of the playoffs (though it preserved his franchise record 102.5 yards per game in a playoff season).

On, March 10, 2006, Foster agreed to a three-year, $14.5 million contract with a $4.5 million signing bonus with another $3 million in escalators and incentives. This was a $700,000 raise over the transition tag tender placed on Foster in February. He led the team in rushing attempts and yards the next two seasons, increasingly splitting time with DeAngelo Williams.

On February 21, 2008, he was released by the Panthers.

==== San Francisco 49ers ====
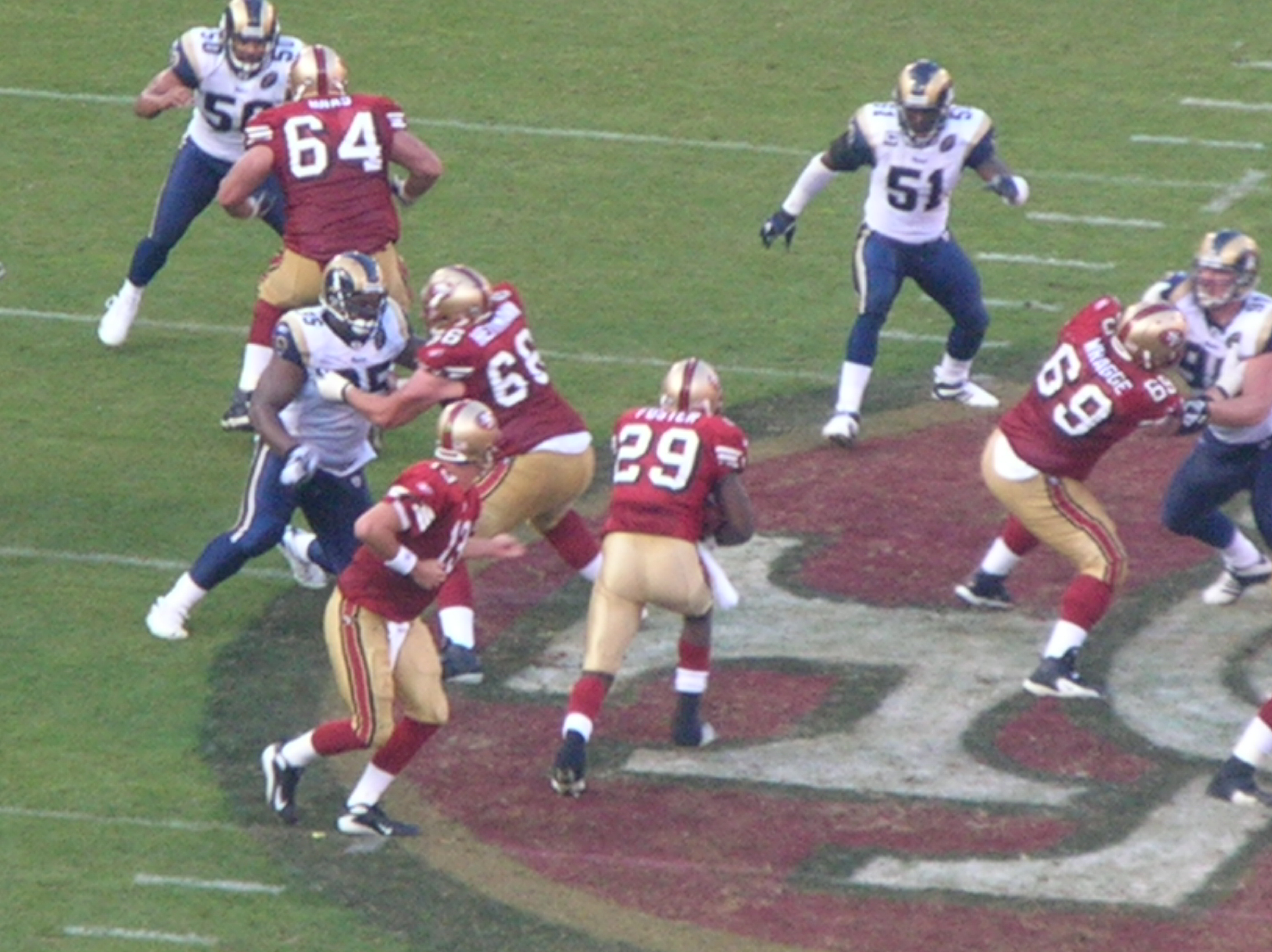
Foster (No. 29) carries the ball against the St. Louis Rams on November 16, 2008

On February 29, 2008, the San Francisco 49ers signed Foster to a one-year contract worth around $1.8 million, to be a back-up behind starter Frank Gore. He played in 16 games, amassing 234 rushing yards and 133 receiving yards.

== Coaching career ==
=== UCLA ===
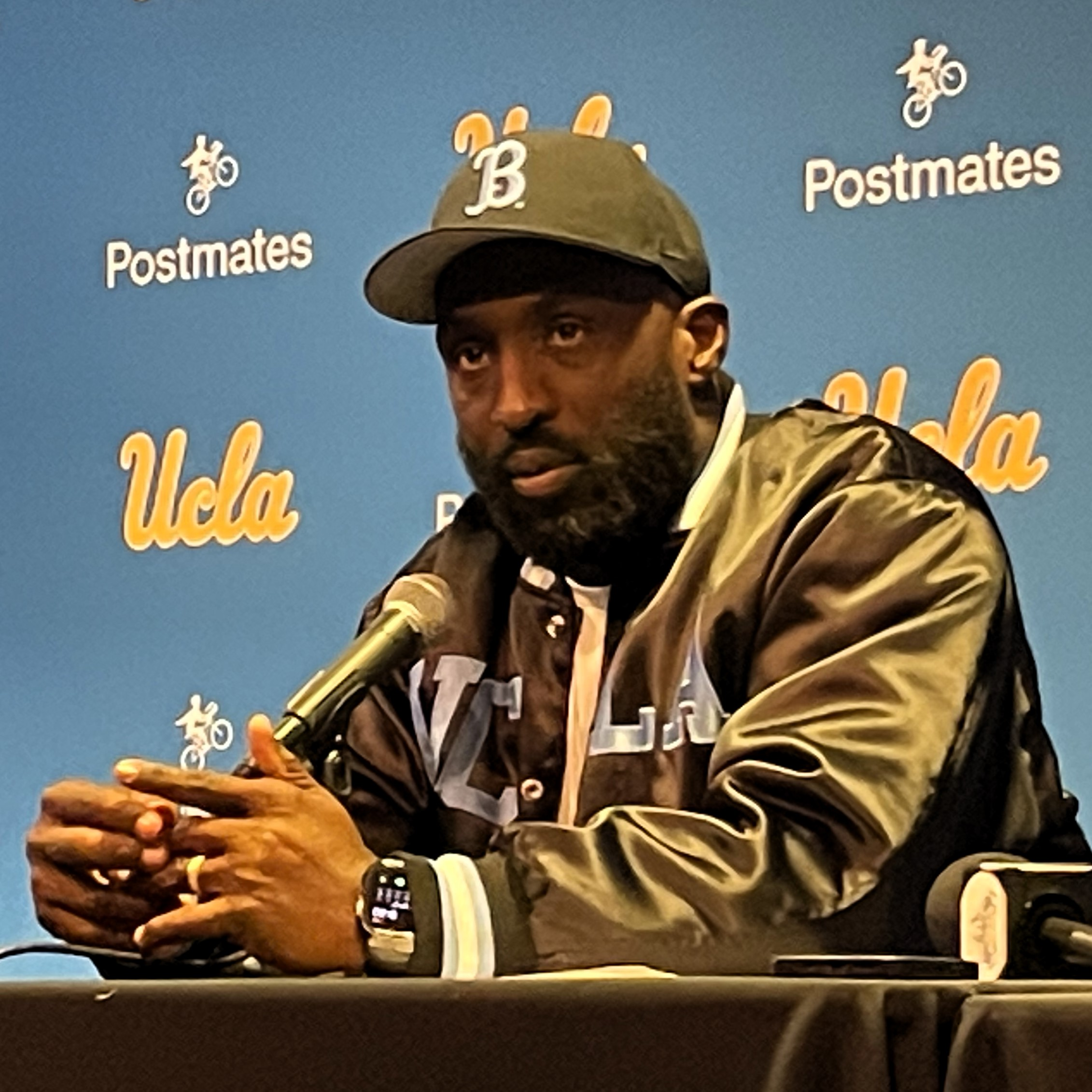
Foster in a post-game press conference as UCLA head coach in 2024

In 2012, Foster joined UCLA as a volunteer assistant under head coach Jim L. Mora. In 2013, he became a graduate assistant at UCLA. In 2015, he became the program's director of player development and high school relations.

=== Texas Tech ===
In 2016, Foster was hired as the running backs coach for the Texas Tech Red Raiders under head coach Kliff Kingsbury.

=== UCLA (second stint) ===
On January 21, 2017, Foster returned to UCLA as their running backs coach under head coach Jim L. Mora. In 2018, Foster was retained under head coach Chip Kelly.

On February 12, 2024, Foster was hired as UCLA's head coach, signing a five-year contract for $3 million in the first year with annual increases of $100,000. The Bruins were 5–7 in 2024, starting the season 1–5 before winning four of their last six games.

On September 14, 2025, after an 0–3 start to his second season, Foster was fired by UCLA. He finished his head coaching tenure with a 5–10 record.

== Personal life ==
Foster and his wife, Charity, have one daughter together.

== Career statistics ==
=== Playing career ===
==== NFL ====
			Rushing				Receiving
Season	Team	League	GP	Att	Yds	TD	Rec	Yds	TD
2003	Carolina	NFL	14	113	429	0	14	26	2
2004	Carolina	NFL	4	59	255	2	9	76	0
2005	Carolina	NFL	15	205	879	2	34	372	1
2006	Carolina	NFL	14	227	897	3	49	159	0
2007	Carolina	NFL	16	247	876	3	25	182	1
2008	San Francisco	NFL	16	76	234	1	16	133	1
Regular season totals			79	927	3,570	11	142	1,129	5

==== College ====
Season	Team	GP	Rushing				Receiving			
Season	Team	GP	Att	Yds	Avg	TD	Rec	Yds	Avg	TD
1998	UCLA	11	116	635	5.5	10	15	150	10.0	2
1999	UCLA	9	111	375	3.4	6	17	114	6.7	0
2000	UCLA	10	243	930	3.8	11	16	142	8.9	1
2001	UCLA	8	216	1,109	5.1	12	9	129	14.3	1
Career		38	686	3,049	4.4	39	57	535	9.4	0

=== Head coaching record ===
Year	Team	Overall	Conference	Standing	Bowl/playoffs
UCLA Bruins (Big Ten Conference) (2024–2025)
2024	UCLA	5–7	3–6	T–12th	
2025	UCLA	0–3 (Note: UCLA fired Foster after three games.)	0–0		
UCLA:		5–10	3–6		
Total:		5–10			
