= Joe Rucker =

American country music musician (born 1976)

Joe Rucker (born October 11, 1976 in Baytown, Texas) is an American country music musician.

== Career ==
Joe Rucker is the youngest of three children. He was born near Houston, Texas, in Baytown, where his father was working a construction contract. Shortly after his birth, the family moved back to their previous home in Geneva, Florida.

He grew up listening to his father, Jerry Rucker, play the guitar and write songs. The family sang on a regular basis at churches and community functions. His sister Michelle (Shelly), vividly recalls him being so shy about being on stage, that he hid behind her while they sang. But that shyness eventually evaporated completely in his late teens, due to (in part) him meeting legendary Grand Ole Opry star, Hank Locklin. The two originally met in 1990, and went on to develop a lifelong friendship until Locklin's death in 2009. Joe often says that first meeting spent with Locklin set off his passion for music like never before, and was a pivotal turning point in his life as a musician.

He made the move to Nashville, Tennessee in October 1998. One month later, he was invited by Jack Greene to appear on Ernest Tubb's Midnite Jamboree, which is broadcast from "The Air Castle of the South", WSM AM Radio 650, and "Home of the Grand Ole Opry". Since that time, Rucker has made multiple appearances with Bill Anderson, Hank Locklin, Charlie Louvin, Jett Williams, Junior Brown, Paulette Carlson, Glenn Douglas Tubb, Margie Singleton, and others. The Midnite Jamboree is the second oldest live country music radio show in the world. Over the years, it has featured artists such as its original host, Ernest Tubb, along with other stars such as Stonewall Jackson, Martha Carson, Elvis Presley, George Hamilton IV, Loretta Lynn, T. Graham Brown, Randy Travis, Marty Stuart, Patsy Cline, and Hank Williams.

Rucker released his first album entitled Nashville Scenes in 2001. He co-produced it with Doyle Grisham. In 2007, his second effort Untangle My Mind was released. This eighteen song project was self produced by Rucker and included duets with Clifford Curry, Hank Locklin, and Eddy Raven.

As a musician, Rucker is credited on Locklin's 2006 gospel album, By The Grace of God: The Gospel Album, which also included the Oak Ridge Boys, the Jordanaires, and Gold City.

In late 2009, he joined cartoonist / singer / songwriter Guy Gilchrist as bandleader of his group called The Comics. The group did a series of Christmas shows in December 2009 with guest artists Mandy Barnett and Tommy Cash. Rucker left the group in the fall of 2010.

On September 11, 2010, Rucker and his group from Nashville (which included Jennifer Brantley) made his debut on the legendary Wheeling Jamboree out of Wheeling, WV. The Jamboree was once the longtime rival of legendary country radio shows such as the Grand Ole Opry and the Louisiana Hayride and at one time had artists such as Grandpa Jones, Louvin Brothers, the Osborne Brothers, Chickie Williams & Doc Williams, and Jimmy Dickens.

In 2011, the biography Joe Rucker was published by Duc, written and compiled by Jordan Naoum.

On the songwriter circuit, Joe has been in rotation on several of the songwriters rounds in Nashville working with the likes of legendary writers such as Nashville Songwriters Hall of Fame member, Jerry Foster as well as Jim McBride, Jimmy Payne, Glenn Douglas Tubb, Jimmy Fortune, Dallas Frazier and Marty Raybon.

As an artist, Joe has opened or shared the stage with many of Nashville's hit makers such as Eddy Raven, Baillie & the Boys, Mandy Barnett, Jeannie C. Riley, Leona Williams, Bobby G. Rice, Michael Peterson (singer), John Berry (country singer), Kevin Sharp, Blackhawk (band), Lila McCann, Lorrie Morgan, Linda Davis, Merrill Osmond, Doug Supernaw, Doug Stone, David Ball (country singer), Jeannie Kendall, Rex Allen Jr., and countless others.

In 2013, Joe shared the loss of the music community when his friend and mentor Jack Greene passed away. He was asked to sing one of Jack's signature tunes "Statue of a Fool" for the Opry Star's Celebration of Life at the Ryman Auditorium. In attendance were several Opry members, including Garth Brooks, who paid Rucker a high complement for his talent and professionalism.

Joe continues to write, record, and perform across the country. In recent years he has teamed up with the legendary Margie Singleton, telling crowds on stage and radio that she is his "Tennessee Mama", while she proclaims him one of her adopted sons. In the summer of 2018, Karen Wheeler released her autobiography entitled My Father's Daughter, which recounts humorous stories on and off stage of Wheeler's life. Joe is mentioned in one of those stories and has several pictures in the book as well. That year, Rucker was inducted into the Nashville Chapter of the Academy of Local Musicians Hall of Fame. Others honored with the same recognition include: Jan Howard, Margie Singleton, Jeannie Seely, Tim Atwood, Hawkshaw Hawkins Jr., Scott Sexton, and Exile (American band).

In 2019, Joe released his third album project, "Underhanded Game". A more edgy sounding album than the previous two, it showcased a darker period in his life, highlighting his divorce and lost loves. Included among the tracks was a duet with the late Jim Glaser, which is believed to be his last recording. It also included a rendition of the classic rock tune penned by Glaser and writing partner Jimmy Payne (which was propelled to fame by Gary Puckett and The Union Gap) called Woman, Woman.

As of 2023, Joe Rucker remained active in the music scene as well as venturing out into films. He appears in a scene with country hit makers Marty Raybon and Deborah Allen in a Christian film called Christmas At Keestone (starring Ben Graham, Candice Graham, Kevin Sorbo, Corbin Bernsen), releasing November 23, 2023, filmed at Keestone Resort in Loretto, TN. He also filmed a scene for Christian film maker Dave Christiano called A Time To Dance which features a self-penned Joe Rucker tune "Oh Heart", set to release in early 2025.

In the summer of 2023, Rucker was signed to Heart Of Texas Records, out of Brady, Texas, under the direction of President and CEO Tracy Pitcox (Texas Country DJ Hall of Fame Member). An album of duets was released in October, 2024 entitled: Takin' A Walk (with Friends) - The Duet Sessions. Notable duet artists as: Darrell McCall, Diane McCall, Tony Booth, Jeannie C. Riley, Leon Everette, Margie Singleton, and Justin Trevino. The project is being produced by Trevino, who is well known in traditional country music circles himself, for keeping the flame of tradition glowing. The year 2023 also saw Joe hosting the world famous Midnite Jamboree for the second time (he has appeared multiple times over the years), for which the great guitarist Doyle Dykes was his featured guest (among his other guests Diane McCall, Justin Dukes, and Sonny Wright).

After over 25 years in Nashville, Joe Rucker has seen many of his musical dreams come true. He has worked with many of his musical heroes, has toured towns all over the country gaining grass roots fans everywhere he goes. He has performed at venues sought after by every Nashville musician including several solos performances at the Ryman Auditorium, Wheeling Jamboree, Midnite Jamboree, CMA Fest, and Heart of Texas Country Music Festival. When asked what his goals are for the future, Rucker responded, "My life-long dream is to perform on the Grand Ole Opry. I've performed on a few shows at the Ryman for different events, and I've been on WSM radio multiple times, but I still have not had the opportunity to debut on the Opry. That's my dream. That's the high mark for me. I can tell you just about everything about the Grand Ole Opry and its history...from Uncle Dave Macon and DeFord Bailey to Mark Wills and Carrie Underwood. Everything within my being loves the Opry like a guitar loves good strings. I will never stop longing to perform on the greatest show on earth; The Grand Ole Opry!"

His father, Jerry Rucker, worked in the Space Shuttle program for more than 35 years, and wrote several songs specifically geared towards the Shuttle program. The first song, called Blastoff Columbia, was used to wake up astronauts Robert Crippen and John Young from their first night in space during STS-1. It was a great honor for the entire family, and the song has been featured in several NASA videos and television news reels regarding the Shuttle program.
