= Ekers =

Ekers may refer to the following people

Given name

- Ekers Raposo (born 1967), Olympic judoka from Dominican Republic

Surname

- Henry Archer Ekers (1855–1937), Canadian industrialist and politician
- Ronald Ekers (born 1941), Australian radio astronomer

== See also ==
- 18239 Ekers, a minor planet
