= Ruck =

Ruck may refer to:

- Ruck (rugby union), a contesting for the ball in Rugby Union from a grounded player
- Ruck (Australian rules football), an aerial contest in Australian-rules football between rival rucks
- Ruck (rugby league), the area surrounding a tackled player in rugby-league football

People

- Sean Price, American rapper who went by the name "Ruck" as a member of Heltah Skeltah
- Alan Ruck (born 1956), American actor
- Berta Ruck (1878–1978), British writer of short stories and romance novels
- Calvin Ruck (1925–2004), Canadian senator and author
- Carl A. P. Ruck (born 1935), American professor of Classical Studies
- Carl Ruck (field hockey) (1912–1980), German field-hockey player
- Caroline Rück, Swiss curler
- Monique Ruck-Petit (born 1942), Swiss and French chess master
- Richard Ruck (1851–1935), Welsh footballer and Royal Engineers soldier
- Róbert Ruck (born 1977), Hungarian chess grandmaster
- Sian Ruck (born 1953), New Zealand international cricketer
- Ulrich Rück (1882–1962), German collector of musical instruments and dealer in pianofortes
- Wolfgang Ruck (born 1946), Canadian sprint canoeist

== See also ==
- Ruck family tree: showing the relationships between some of the above
- Rucker (disambiguation)
- Rucking
