= Rekers GmbH =

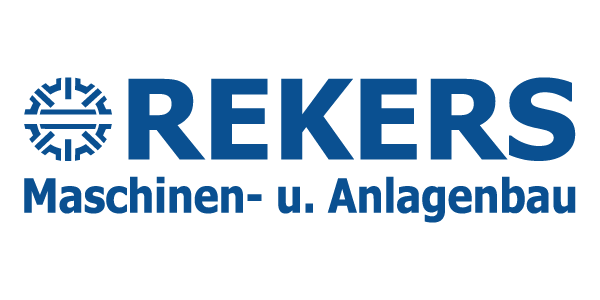
- Rekers GmbH logo
- Native name: Rekers GmbH Maschinen- und Anlagenbau
- Formerly: Dipl.-Ing. Karl Rekers
- Company type: GmbH
- Industry: Manufacturer
- Founded: October 1, 1955; 70 years ago in Germany
- Founder: Karl Rekers (1929 - 2023)
- Headquarters: Spelle, Germany
- Area served: Europe, North America, Gulf, Central Asia, India
- Products: Industrial products
- Number of employees: 200
- Subsidiaries: in Great Britain, USA
- Website: www.rekers.de/en/

Rekers (German: Rekers GmbH Maschinen- und Anlagenbau) is a German worldwide company which builds machines and plants for the concrete industry.

Rekers participated in Bauma and EXCON exhibitions.

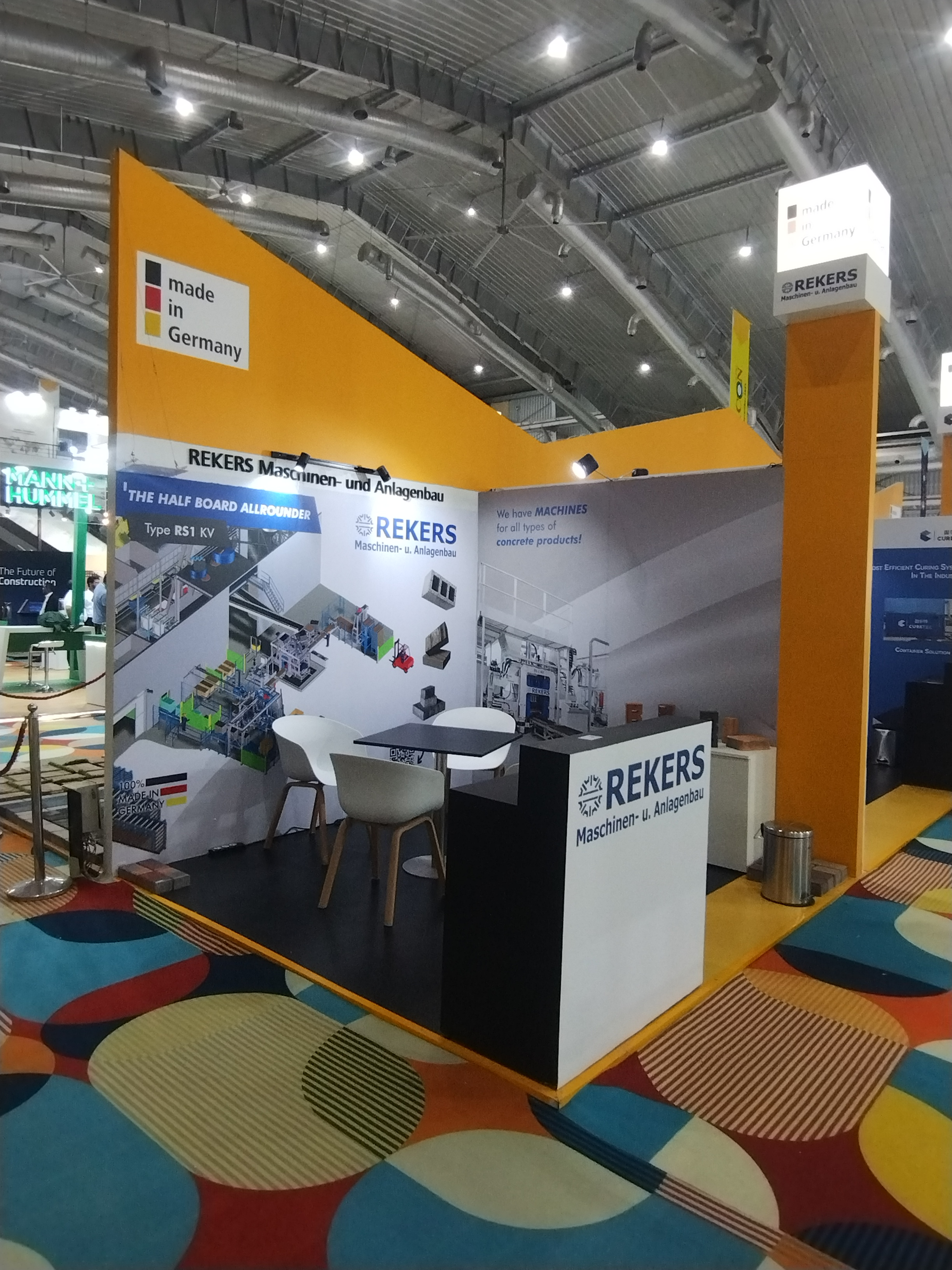
Rekers GmbH at EXCON 2025, BIEC
