= Sam Baker (offensive tackle) =

American football player (born 1985)

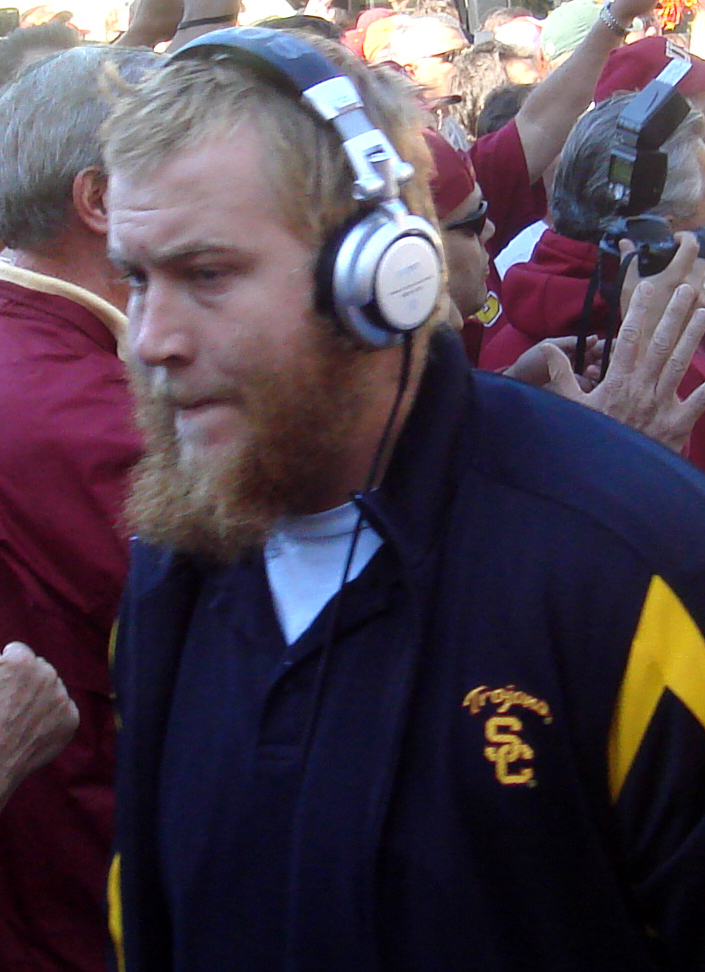
- Baker with the USC Trojans in 2007

No. 72
- Position: Offensive tackle

Personal information
- Born: May 30, 1985 (age 41); Tustin, California, U.S.
- Listed height: 6 ft 5 in (1.96 m)
- Listed weight: 301 lb (137 kg)

Career information
- High school: Tustin
- College: USC (2003–2007)
- NFL draft: 2008: 1st round, 21st overall pick

Career history
- Atlanta Falcons (2008–2014)

Awards and highlights
- 3× First-team All-American (2005–2007); 3× First-team All-Pac-10 (2005–2007); Second-team All-Pac-10 (2004)

Career NFL statistics
- Games played: 70
- Games started: 61
- Stats at Pro Football Reference

Samuel David Baker (born May 30, 1985) is an American former professional football player who was an offensive tackle in the National Football League (NFL). He played college football for the USC Trojans and was a three-time All-American. He was selected by the Atlanta Falcons in the first round of the 2008 NFL draft.

== Early life ==
Baker was born in Tustin, California. He graduated from Tustin High School. He played in the 2003 U.S. Army All-American Bowl.

== College career ==
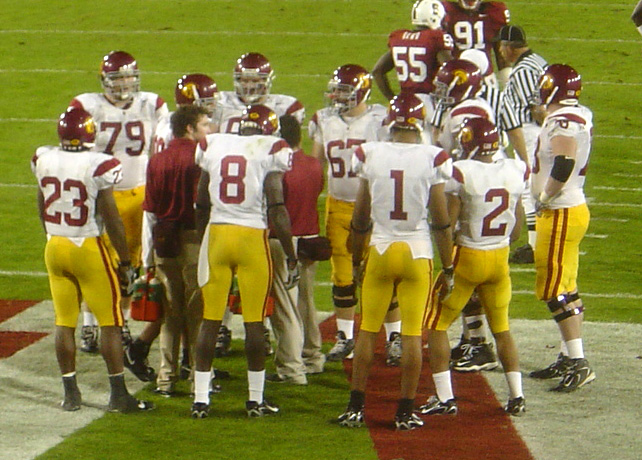
Baker (#79) in the huddle during a 2006 game

Baker attended the University of Southern California, where he played for coach Pete Carroll's USC Trojans football team from 2003 to 2007. He was a first-team All-American as a redshirt sophomore in 2005.

He was on the official 2006 watch list for the Lombardi Award and the Outland Trophy for the best lineman. In his collegiate career Baker blocked for Reggie Bush and Matt Leinart. He was named a first-team All-Pacific-10 Conference selection by the league's coaches in 2005 and 2006. He was a recognized as a consensus first-team All-American, having received first-team honors from the Football Writers Association of America, Sporting News and CBSSports.com.

Going into his fourth year as a starter, Baker was on the Lombardi Award and Outland Trophy watch lists. He was ranked as one of the "Top 20 Players Heading Into 2007" by Sports Illustrated. Before his final season in 2007, Baker was already regarded by most NFL scouts as a certain top-five player in the 2008 NFL draft.

During the 2007 season, Baker took on a leadership role in the offensive line, taking over the reins from departed senior Ryan Kalil and providing motivation as well as helping teach younger players.

Despite suffering from injuries that held him out of games, Baker was again a first-team All-Pac-10 selection for his third consecutive year. Baker was also named Walter Camp first-team All-American in 2007.

== Professional career ==
Pre-draft measurables
Height	Weight	Arm length	Hand span	40-yard dash	10-yard split	20-yard split	20-yard shuttle	Three-cone drill	Vertical jump	Broad jump	Bench press
6 ft 4 5/8 in (1.95 m)	309 lb (140 kg)	32 3/4 in (0.83 m)	9 1/4 in (0.23 m)	5.50 s	1.87 s	3.13 s	4.92 s	8.02 s	28.5 in (0.72 m)	9 ft 0 in (2.74 m)	29 reps
All values from NFL Combine/Pro Day

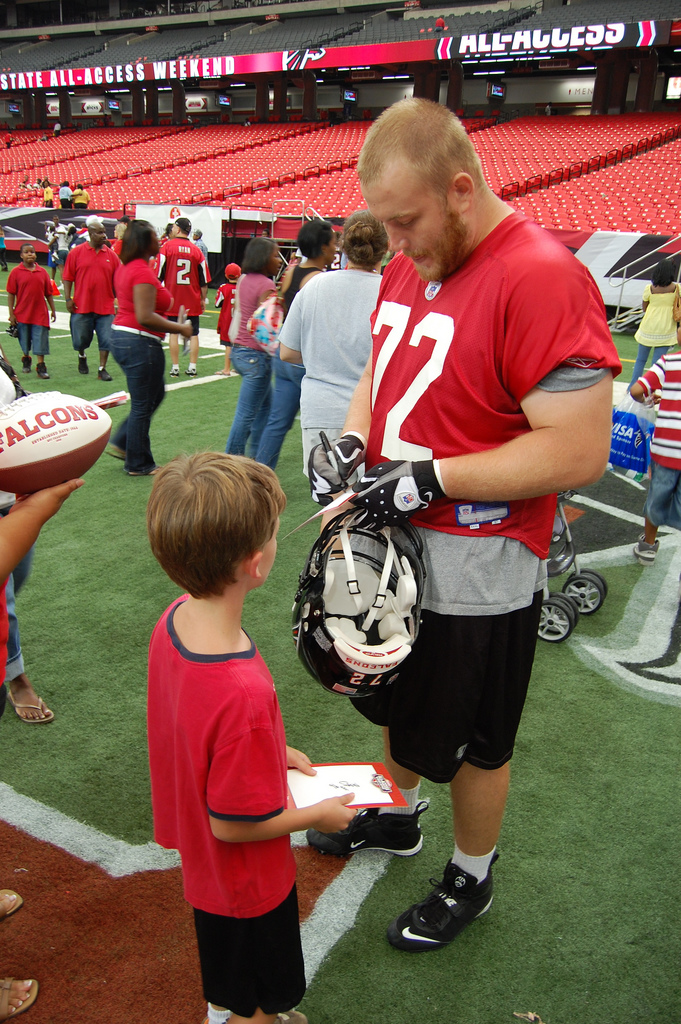
Baker signs an autograph in the 2008 "Roam the Dome" event at the Georgia Dome.

Sam Baker was selected by the Atlanta Falcons in the first round (21st overall) of the 2008 NFL draft after the Falcons traded two of their second-round picks (No. 34 and No. 48) and a fourth round pick (No. 103) with the Washington Redskins to move to No. 21 overall. On July 25, he signed a multi-year contract. In his rookie year, 2008, Baker started 5 games. On March 13, 2013, Baker re-signed with the Falcons for six years worth $41.5 million, including $18.25 million guaranteed.

Baker's career was marred by injuries and he only competed in all 16 games in two seasons (2010 and 2012). He played in four games in 2013 before suffering a torn left patellar tendon which sidelined him for the rest of the year. In the second game of the 2014 preseason, Baker suffered a torn patellar tendon injury in his right knee, which ended his season. Baker was released on June 15, 2015.

== Personal ==
Baker is the son of former Pro Football Hall of Fame President & CEO and former Arena Football League commissioner C. David Baker. Sam married his wife, Antoinette, in 2008. He also is the brother of Ben Baker, who is the Senior Director of Broadcasting for NASCAR.
