= Mike Rucker =

American football player (born 1975)

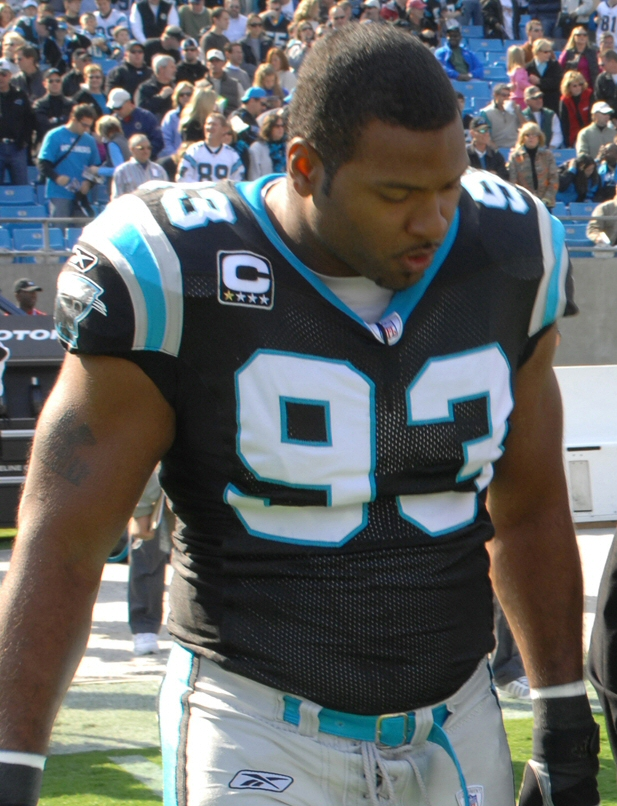
- Rucker with the Carolina Panthers in 2007

No. 93
- Position: Defensive end

Personal information
- Born: February 28, 1975 (age 51); St. Joseph, Missouri, U.S.
- Listed height: 6 ft 5 in (1.96 m)
- Listed weight: 275 lb (125 kg)

Career information
- High school: Benton (St. Joseph)
- College: Nebraska
- NFL draft: 1999: 2nd round, 38th overall pick

Career history
- Carolina Panthers (1999–2007)

Awards and highlights
- Pro Bowl (2003); NFL Alumni Defensive Lineman of the Year (2003); 2× National champion (1995, 1997); Second-team All-Big 12 (1998)

Career NFL statistics
- Total tackles: 422
- Sacks: 55.5
- Forced fumbles: 15
- Fumble recoveries: 7
- Interceptions: 1
- Stats at Pro Football Reference

Michael Dean Rucker (born February 28, 1975) is an American former professional football player who was a defensive end for nine seasons with the Carolina Panthers of the National Football League (NFL). He played college football for the Nebraska Cornhuskers, and was selected by the Panthers in the second round of the 1999 NFL draft.

== Early life ==
Rucker played both sides of the ball in high school including catching 15 passes for 300 yards as a tight end. He was the team's leading tackler with 168 stops, including 58 solos, leading Benton to a 28-8 three-year record. Rucker placed fourth in the state in the shot put as a junior and was the state champion in 1994, with a throw of 54–2. He went unbeaten in 10 meets during his senior season. Rucker lettered 10 times in high school, including three each in football and basketball and four in track. He was a two-time all-state lineman, and made the All-America team his senior year. In addition, he also lettered in track & field four years, and was a state champion shot putter. He also earned three letters on the Benton High School basketball team.

== College career ==
Rucker attended the University of Nebraska–Lincoln, where he played for the Nebraska Cornhuskers football team. He redshirted as a true freshman, and then collected his first sack the following season. He was a member of the national champion Cornhuskers team in 1995 and 1997. As a senior in 1998, he made second-team All-Big 12, despite missing much of the season because of injury. He finished his college days as Nebraska's fourth all-time tackler behind the line of scrimmage, with 40 stops.

== Professional career ==
Pre-draft measurables
| Height | Weight | Arm length | Hand span | 40-yard dash | 10-yard split | 20-yard split | 20-yard shuttle | Three-cone drill | Vertical jump | Broad jump | Bench press |
|---|---|---|---|---|---|---|---|---|---|---|---|
| 6 ft 4 3/4 in (1.95 m) | 260 lb (118 kg) | 32 7/8 in (0.84 m) | 9 1/2 in (0.24 m) | 4.90 s | 1.71 s | 2.85 s | 4.33 s | 7.40 s | 33.5 in (0.85 m) | 9 ft 7 in (2.92 m) | 17 reps |
All values from NFL Combine

Rucker was drafted by Carolina in the second round (38th overall) of the 1999 NFL draft. He collected three sacks his rookie year, playing in all 16 games. His first sack came against Cincinnati Bengals quarterback Jeff Blake. He registered 2.5 sacks in his second season, and became a starter for the 2001 NFL season. He ended the season leading the team with 9 sacks. He was the NFL Defensive Player of the Month for September 2003, when he had 5 sacks, 21 tackles, 13 hurries and one batted pass during the first four games of the 2003 NFL season. He and fellow defensive end Julius Peppers were the only duo to register 10 sacks each. The following year, Rucker again won Defensive Player of the Month for September, becoming only the 11th player in history to win POTM honors for the same month in two consecutive years; former Panther Sam Mills won POTM in November 1995 and 1996. Rucker finished the season with 12 sacks, and earned his first berth in the Pro Bowl.

On December 17, 2006, in a game against the Pittsburgh Steelers, Rucker suffered an anterior cruciate ligament (ACL) tear in his left knee, causing him to miss the remainder of the 2006 season. He returned for his final season in 2007, before announcing his retirement from the game on April 22, 2008.

== Career statistics ==
=== NFL ===
| Year | Team | GP | Tackles | | | | Fumbles | | Interceptions | | | | | |
| Year | Team | GP | Comb | Solo | Ast | Sack | FF | FR | Int | Yds | Avg | Lng | TD | PD |
|---|---|---|---|---|---|---|---|---|---|---|---|---|---|---|
| 1999 | CAR | 16 | 30 | 24 | 6 | 3.0 | 0 | 0 | 0 | 0 | 0.0 | 0 | 0 | 2 |
| 2000 | CAR | 16 | 39 | 33 | 6 | 2.5 | 1 | 0 | 0 | 0 | 0.0 | 0 | 0 | 1 |
| 2001 | CAR | 16 | 55 | 43 | 12 | 9.0 | 3 | 1 | 0 | 0 | 0.0 | 0 | 0 | 1 |
| 2002 | CAR | 16 | 66 | 57 | 9 | 10.0 | 4 | 1 | 0 | 0 | 0.0 | 0 | 0 | 7 |
| 2003 | CAR | 14 | 58 | 46 | 12 | 12.0 | 1 | 0 | 1 | 0 | 0.0 | 0 | 0 | 5 |
| 2004 | CAR | 16 | 38 | 35 | 3 | 3.5 | 1 | 1 | 0 | 0 | 0.0 | 0 | 0 | 5 |
| 2005 | CAR | 15 | 44 | 35 | 9 | 7.5 | 4 | 2 | 0 | 0 | 0.0 | 0 | 0 | 3 |
| 2006 | CAR | 14 | 39 | 25 | 14 | 5.0 | 1 | 0 | 0 | 0 | 0.0 | 0 | 0 | 2 |
| 2007 | CAR | 16 | 47 | 33 | 14 | 3.0 | 1 | 2 | 0 | 0 | 0.0 | 0 | 0 | 3 |
| Career | | 139 | 416 | 331 | 85 | 55.5 | 16 | 7 | 1 | 0 | 0.0 | 0 | 0 | 29 |

=== College ===
| Season | Class | GP | Tackles | | | | | Interceptions | | | | | Fumbles | | | |
| Season | Class | GP | Cmb | Solo | Ast | TfL | Sck | Int | Yds | Lng | TD | PD | FF | FR | Yds | TD |
|---|---|---|---|---|---|---|---|---|---|---|---|---|---|---|---|---|
| 1995 | Fr | 10 | 14 | 4 | 10 | 2 | 2 | 0 | 0 | 0 | 0 | 0 | 0 | 0 | 0 | 0 |
| 1996 | So | 13 | 34 | 17 | 17 | 16 | 8 | 0 | 0 | 0 | 0 | 1 | 2 | 2 | 0 | 0 |
| 1997 | Jr | 13 | 41 | 20 | 21 | 16 | 8.5 | 0 | 0 | 0 | 0 | 4 | 1 | 1 | 0 | 0 |
| 1998 | Sr | 13 | 60 | 28 | 32 | 14 | 2.5 | 0 | 0 | 0 | 0 | 1 | 3 | 0 | 0 | 0 |
| Career | | 49 | 149 | 69 | 80 | 48 | 21 | 0 | 0 | 0 | 0 | 6 | 6 | 3 | 0 | 0 |

Notes - Statistics include bowl game performances.

== Other activities ==
Rucker, along with former teammates Mike Minter, Stephen Davis, and Muhsin Muhammad, are co-founders of Ruckus House, a child development and learning facility. One of Rucker's long-term goals for Ruckus House is to get one in every city which has an NFL team.

In 2005 Mike founded Vision Group Realty, a full service real estate brokerage firm, providing brokerage services to both buyers and sellers of residential and commercial real estate. The firm headquarters is located in Charlotte, NC, and services relocating clients locally, nationally and globally.

In the 2008 offseason, he traveled to Afghanistan to visit with troops along with Luis Castillo, Tommie Harris, and Sports Illustrated writer Peter King. Rucker made a video documentary of his experiences for NFL Network, stating that if he was not a pro football athlete, he could easily envision himself in the military.

Mike Rucker is a commentator on preseason games for the Carolina Panthers on the Panthers Television Network.

== Family ==
Rucker's younger brother, Martin was drafted by the Cleveland Browns in 2008 NFL draft, 111th overall.
