= Martin Rucker (American football) =

American football player (born 1985)

- Rucker hugs a fan following the 2008 Cotton Bowl Classic

No. 83, 85, 86
- Position: Tight end

Personal information
- Born: May 4, 1985 (age 41); St. Joseph, Missouri, U.S.
- Listed height: 6 ft 5 in (1.96 m)
- Listed weight: 251 lb (114 kg)

Career information
- High school: Benton (St. Joseph)
- College: Missouri
- NFL draft: 2008: 4th round, 111th overall pick

Career history
- Cleveland Browns (2008–2009); Philadelphia Eagles (2009); Tampa Bay Buccaneers (2010)*; Dallas Cowboys (2010–2011); Jacksonville Jaguars (2011); Kansas City Chiefs (2012)
- * Offseason or practice squad member only

Awards and highlights
- Consensus All-American (2007); 2× First-team All-All-Big 12 (2006, 2007); First-team SN Freshman All-Big 12 (2004)

Career NFL statistics
- Receptions: 2
- Receiving yards: 17
- Stats at Pro Football Reference

Martin T. Rucker II (born May 4, 1985) is an American former professional football player who was a tight end in the National Football League (NFL) for the Cleveland Browns, Philadelphia Eagles, Dallas Cowboys, Jacksonville Jaguars, and Kansas City Chiefs. He played college football for the Missouri Tigers, earning consensus All-American honors in 2007. He was chosen by the Cleveland Browns in the fourth round of the 2008 NFL draft.

== Early life ==
Rucker attended Benton High School in St. Joseph, Missouri. He finished his high prep career with 56 catches for 646 yards, 5 touchdowns, 118 tackles and 2 sacks.

As a senior in track, he won the conference and district titles, while placing fourth in the state in the triple jump. He also won the conference championship in the long jump.

He competed in basketball, where he received All-district and All-conference honors as a senior.

== College career ==
Rucker accepted a football scholarship from the University of Missouri, where he played for head coach Gary Pinkel from 2004 to 2007. As a redshirt freshman, he missed most of the spring period with a shoulder injury, but was still promoted to starter ahead of senior Victor Sesay. He started 11 games, collecting 19 receptions for 263 yards and 4 touchdowns. He received second-team Freshman All-American and All-freshman Big 12 honors by The Sporting News.

As a sophomore, he started all 12 games ahead of Chase Coffman, making 47 receptions (tied for the team lead) for 567 yards (led the team) and a 12.1-yard average (led the team). As a junior, he started all 13 contests ahead of Coffman, registering 53 receptions (second on the team) for 511 yards (third on the team) and 5 touchdowns.

As a senior, he started all 12 contests ahead of Coffman, registering 84 receptions (school record) for 834 yards (second on the team) and 8 touchdowns. He was recognized as a consensus first-team All-American tight end, having been named to the first-teams of the American Football Coaches Association and the Associated Press. Rucker finished his collegiate career with over 200 receptions, 2,175 yards, and 18 touchdowns.

He finished his college career with 203 receptions for 2,175 yards and 18 touchdowns. His 203 receptions set a school record and were the most ever by a Big 12 Conference tight end and eighth All-around in the Big 12 Conference. His 2,175 yards ranked second in school history and made him the third Tiger to reach 2,000 career receiving yards. He also set a school record with 50 consecutive starts.

== Professional career ==
Pre-draft measurables
Height	Weight	Arm length	Hand span	Bench press
6 ft 4 7/8 in (1.95 m)	251 lb (114 kg)	34 1/2 in (0.88 m)	9 1/2 in (0.24 m)	20 reps
All values from NFL Combine

=== Cleveland Browns ===
Rucker was selected by the Cleveland Browns in the fourth round (111th overall) of the 2008 NFL draft. On July 22, he signed a contract with the team. As a rookie, he appeared in 5 games, making 2 receptions for 17 yards, both catches resulting in first downs. He was waived on September 22, 2009.

=== Philadelphia Eagles ===
On September 24, 2009, he was signed to the Philadelphia Eagles practice squad. On December 15, he was promoted to the active roster. On August 9, 2010, he was waived after being limited with a hamstring injury.

=== Tampa Bay Buccaneers ===
On August 10, 2010, he was claimed off waivers by the Tampa Bay Buccaneers. He was released the next day on August 11, after failing a physical.

=== Dallas Cowboys ===
On August 19, 2010, Rucker signed with the Dallas Cowboys as a free agent. On September 4, he was cut and signed to the practice squad a day later on September 5. He was promoted to the active roster on December 1, while Scott Chandler was cut to make room for him. He returned one kickoff for 16 yards in a game against the Philadelphia Eagles.

On September 13, 2011, he was waived and re-signed to the practice squad.

=== Jacksonville Jaguars ===
On October 18, 2011, Rucker was signed by the Jacksonville Jaguars off the Dallas Cowboys practice squad, to provide depth after tight end Zach Miller was placed on the injured reserve list.

=== Kansas City Chiefs ===
On May 16, 2012, he signed with the Kansas City Chiefs. On June 13, he was placed on injured reserve with a torn ACL he suffered in training camp. He wasn't re-signed after the season.

=== Retirement ===
On August 6, 2014, Rucker announced his retirement.

=== Career statistics ===
Career Offensive Statistics
Year	G	GS	Rec	Yds	Y/R	TD	Lg
2008	5	1	2	17	8.5	0	9
2009	0	0	0	0	0.0	0	0
TOTAL	5	1	2	17	8.5	0	9

== Politics ==
In February 2016, Rucker announced his candidacy as a Democrat for the Missouri House of Representatives in the state's 14th house district. Despite exceeding the number of votes estimated needed to win, with many unexpected voters turning out for the election resulted in a loss for Rucker by 904 votes. Two years later he ran for the state senate in District 34, covering Platte and Buchanan Counties, losing to Tony Luetkemeyer by a margin of 3,628 votes.

== Personal life ==
Rucker is the younger brother of former NFL defensive end Mike Rucker and the son of politician Martin T. Rucker. He currently lives in his birthplace, Saint Joseph, Missouri, and he is the school board president. He’s spent time working on his political dream and aspiring to the same career as his father.
