= North Raker =

Mountain in Idaho, United States

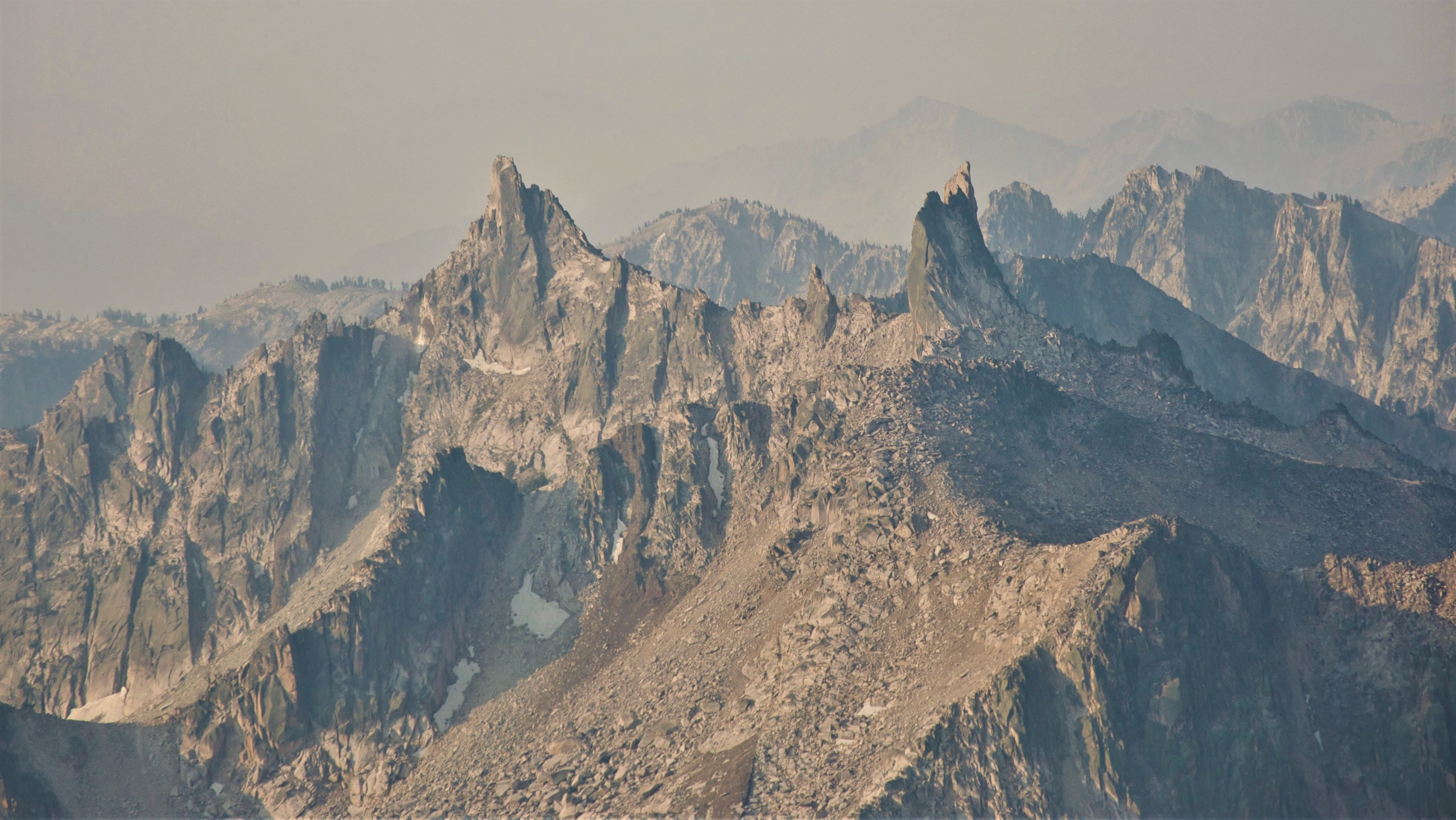
- North Raker aerial view

Highest point
- Elevation: 9,970 ft (3,039 m)
- Prominence: 1,378 ft (420 m)
- Parent peak: Plummer Peak (9,978 ft)
- Isolation: 3.73 mi (6.00 km)
- Listing: Peaks of the Sawtooth Range
- Coordinates: 43°59′44″N 115°06′19″W

Geography
- Location within Idaho Location within the United States
- Location: Sawtooth National Recreation Area
- Country: United States of America
- State: Idaho
- County: Boise
- Parent range: Sawtooth Range; Rocky Mountains
- Topo map: USGS Mount Everly

Geology
- Rock age: Eocene
- Mountain type: Fault block
- Rock type: Granite

Climbing
- First ascent: 1949
- Easiest route: class 5.10 climbing

North Raker is a 9,970-foot elevation (3,039 m) mountain summit located in Boise County, Idaho, United States.

== Description ==
North Raker, also known colloquially as "The Rakers", is part of the Sawtooth Range which is a subset of the Rocky Mountains. The remote mountain is situated 18 miles south-southwest of Stanley, Idaho, in the Sawtooth National Recreation Area. Precipitation runoff from the mountain drains to the South Fork Payette River via Pinchot Creek (west slope) and Fall Creek (east slope). Topographic relief is modest as the summit rises 2,400 feet (730 meters) above each creek in approximately one mile. The first ascent of the summit was made by Fred Beckey and Pete Schoening in 1949. This landform's toponym has been officially adopted by the United States Board on Geographic Names. The descriptive name was applied in 1927 by surveyor Arval Anderson and refers to how the shape of the peak resembles the "raker tooth" of a crosscut saw.

== Climate ==
Based on the Köppen climate classification, North Raker is located in an alpine subarctic climate zone with long, cold, snowy winters, and cool to warm summers. Winter temperatures can drop below −10 °F with wind chill factors below −30 °F.

== Gallery ==
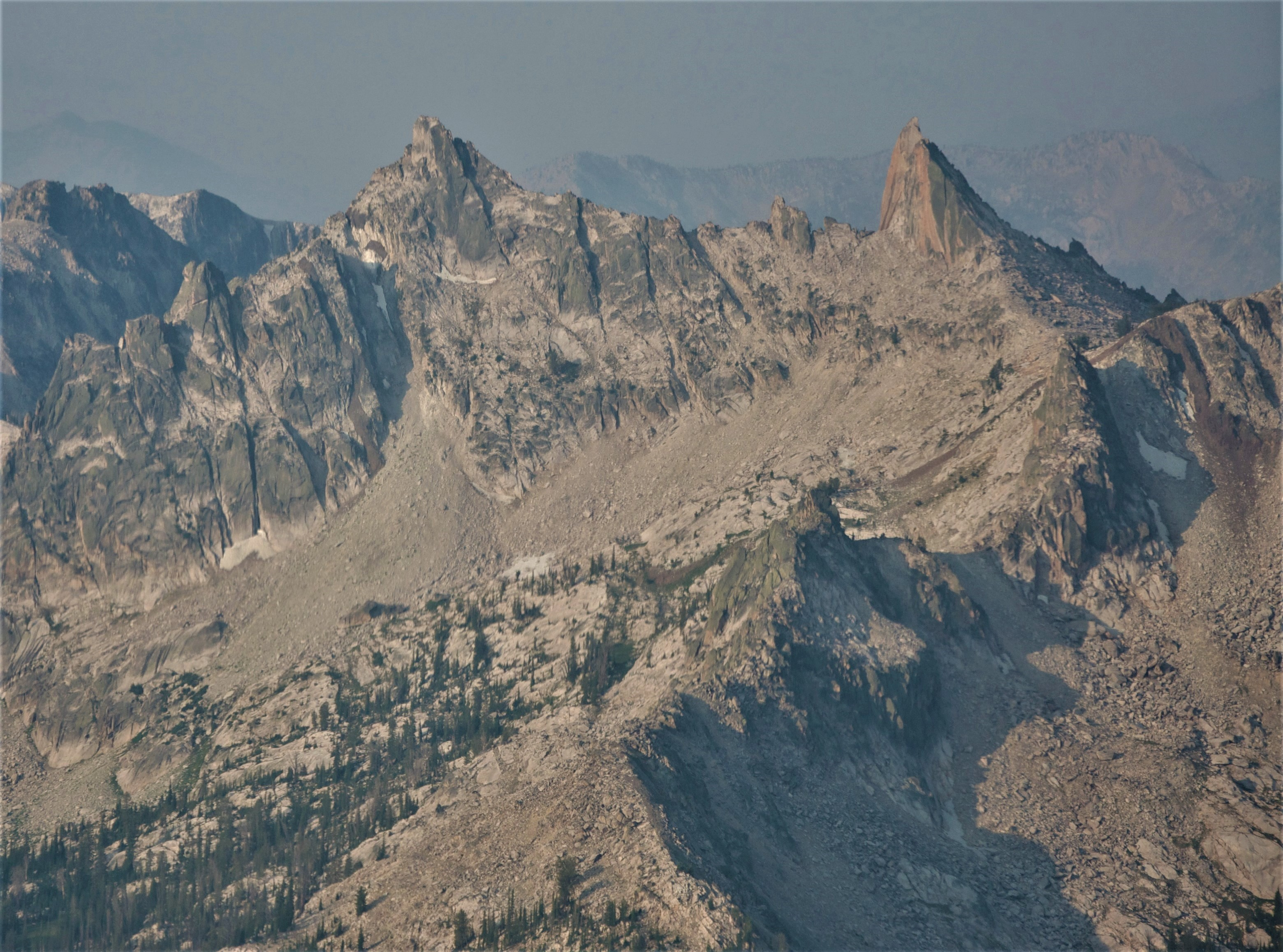
Aerial view of the Rakers

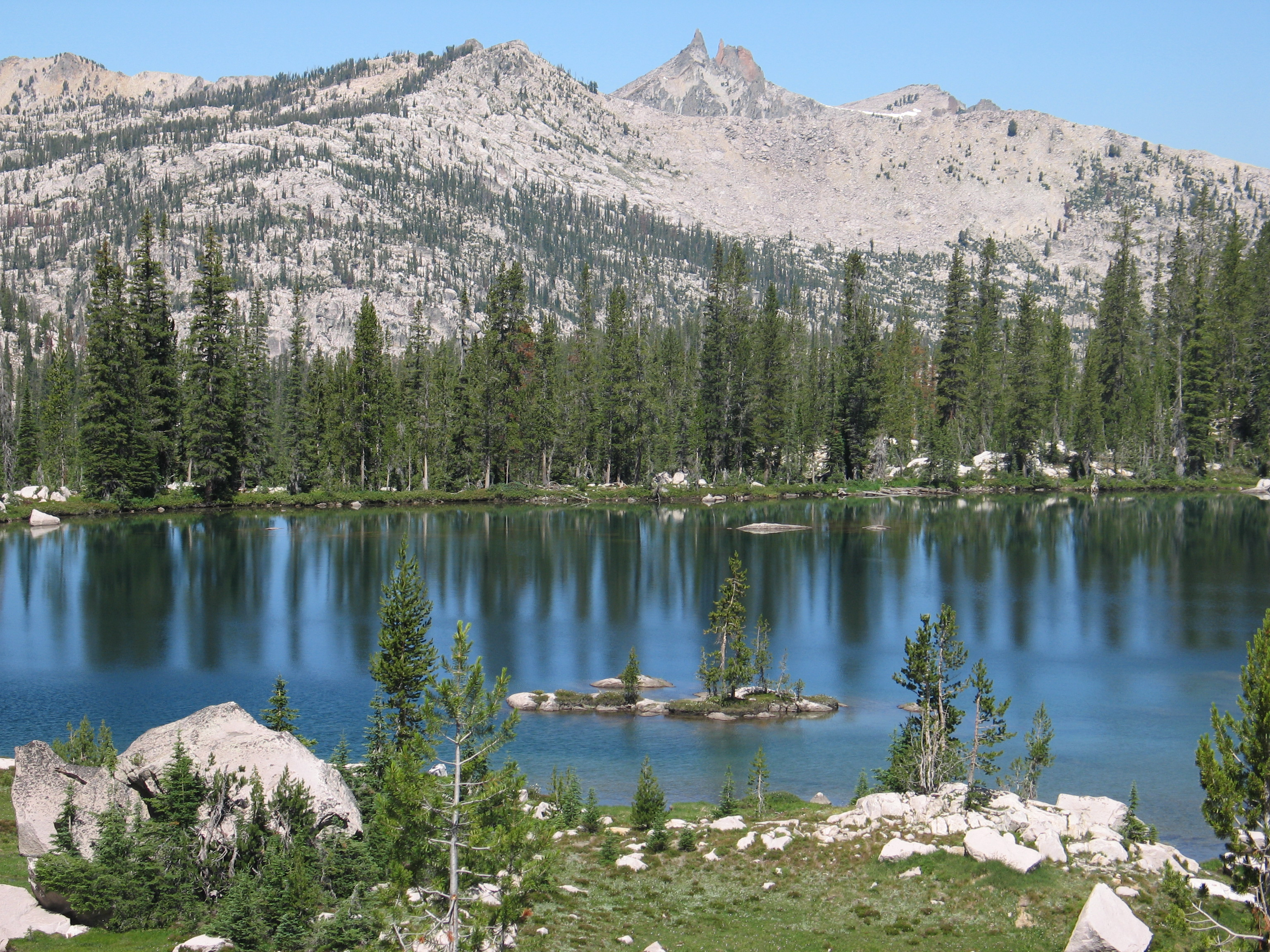
North Raker centered at top

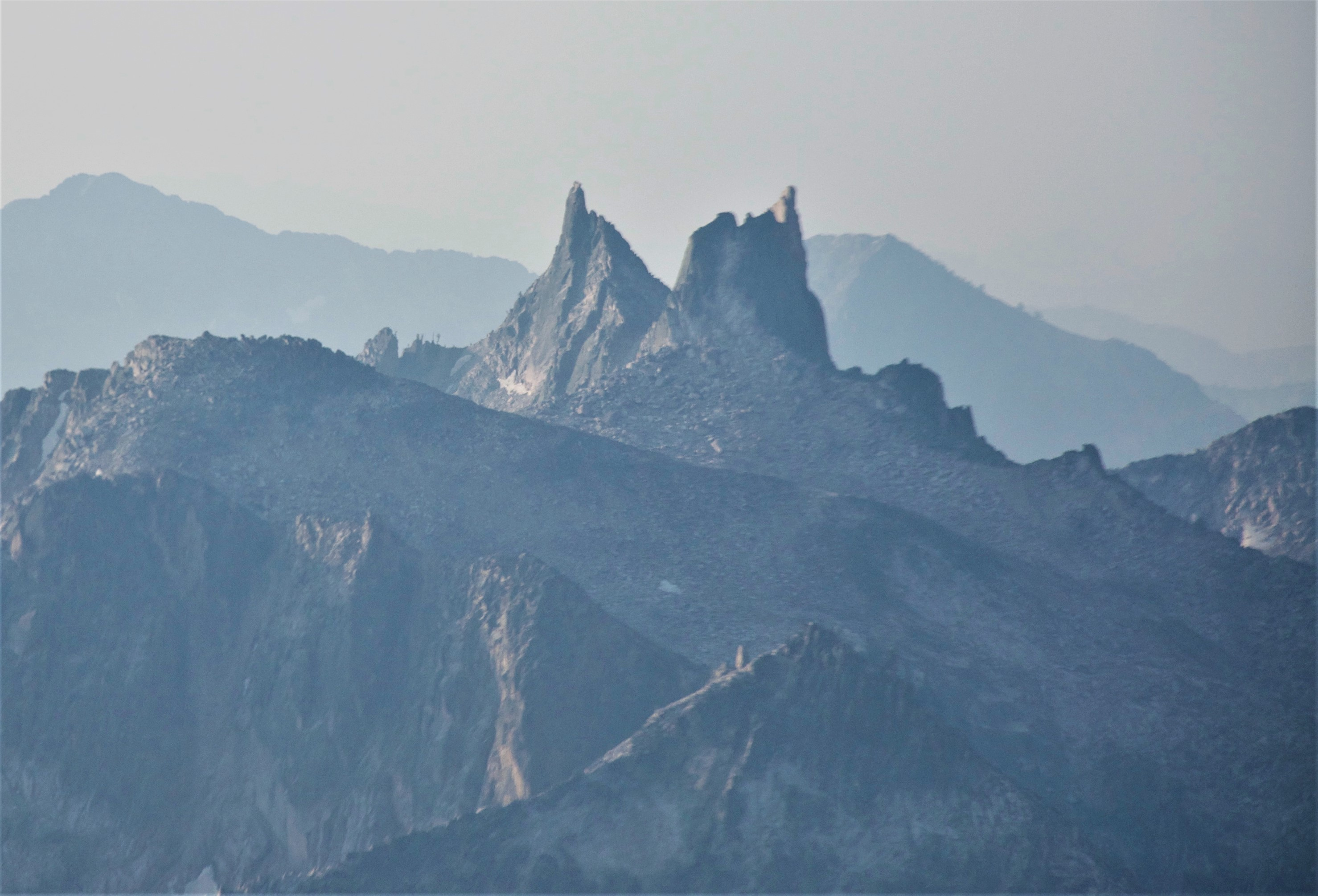
Aerial view of The Rakers, resembling a "raker tooth" of a crosscut saw

== See also ==
- List of mountain peaks of Idaho
