= Chris Chester (American football) =

American football player (born 1983)

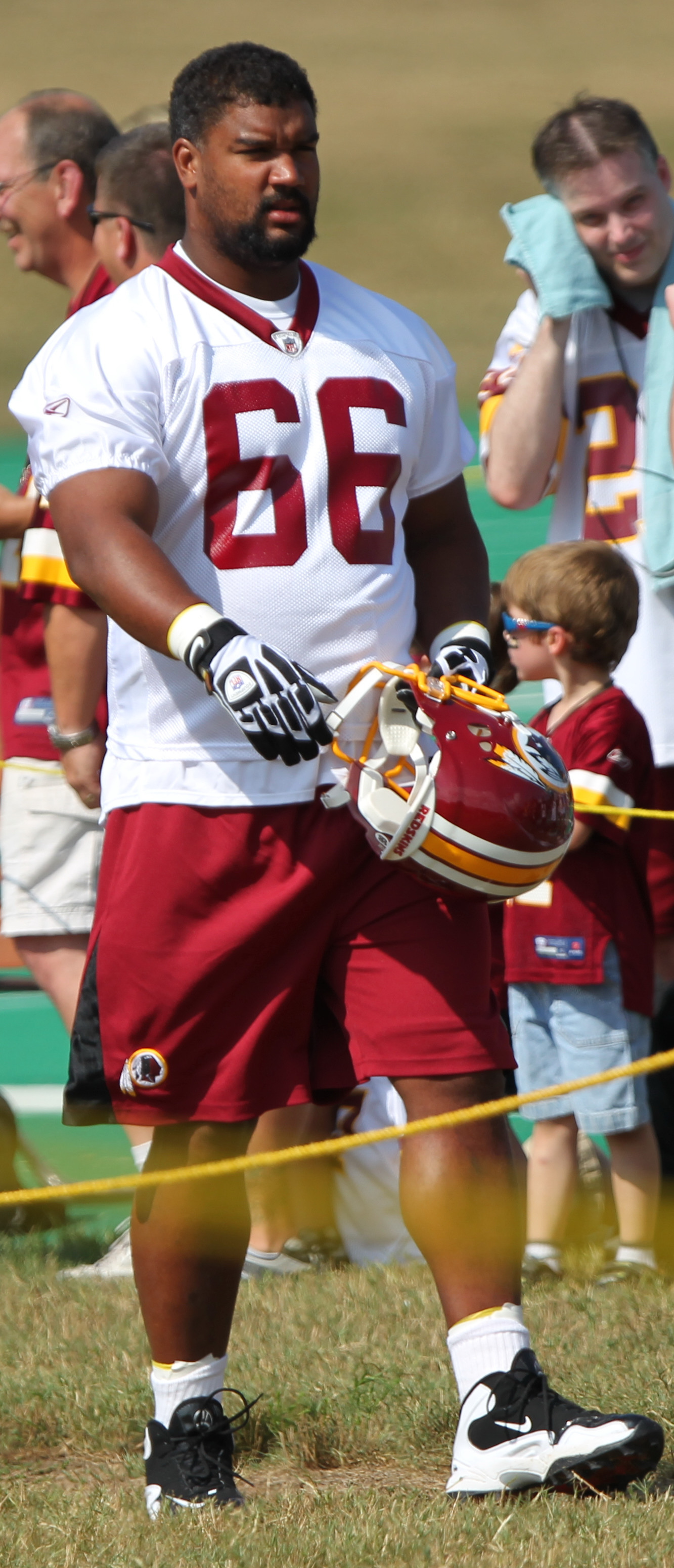
- Chester with the Washington Redskins in 2011

No. 65, 66
- Position: Guard

Personal information
- Born: January 12, 1983 (age 43); Tustin, California, U.S.
- Listed height: 6 ft 3 in (1.91 m)
- Listed weight: 303 lb (137 kg)

Career information
- High school: Tustin
- College: Oklahoma
- NFL draft: 2006: 2nd round, 56th overall pick

Career history
- Baltimore Ravens (2006–2010); Washington Redskins (2011–2014); Atlanta Falcons (2015–2016)

Career NFL statistics
- Games played: 169
- Games started: 143
- Fumble recoveries: 1
- Stats at Pro Football Reference

Christopher Sean Chester (born January 12, 1983) is an American former professional football player who was a guard in the National Football League (NFL). He played college football for the Oklahoma Sooners and was selected by the Baltimore Ravens in the second round of the 2006 NFL draft. He also played for the Washington Redskins and Atlanta Falcons.

== Early life ==
Chester attended Tustin High School in Tustin, California. He recorded 815 yards and 11 touchdowns as a senior and rushed for 450 yards and five touchdowns. This led him to be named defensive player of the year in his league. He was also a Golden West All-League as a junior and senior and a first-team All-Orange County by the Los Angeles Times.

Chester was also a second-team All-league pick in basketball as a junior and a first-team All-league in the discus and shot put as a junior.

Chester was ranked as the eighth best tight end in the nation by Rivals.com.

== College career ==
Chester played college football at the University of Oklahoma. For the first three years, he played as a tight end for the Sooners, but switched over to being an offensive lineman in his senior year. He graduated from the University of Oklahoma with a degree in political science in 2006.

== Professional career ==
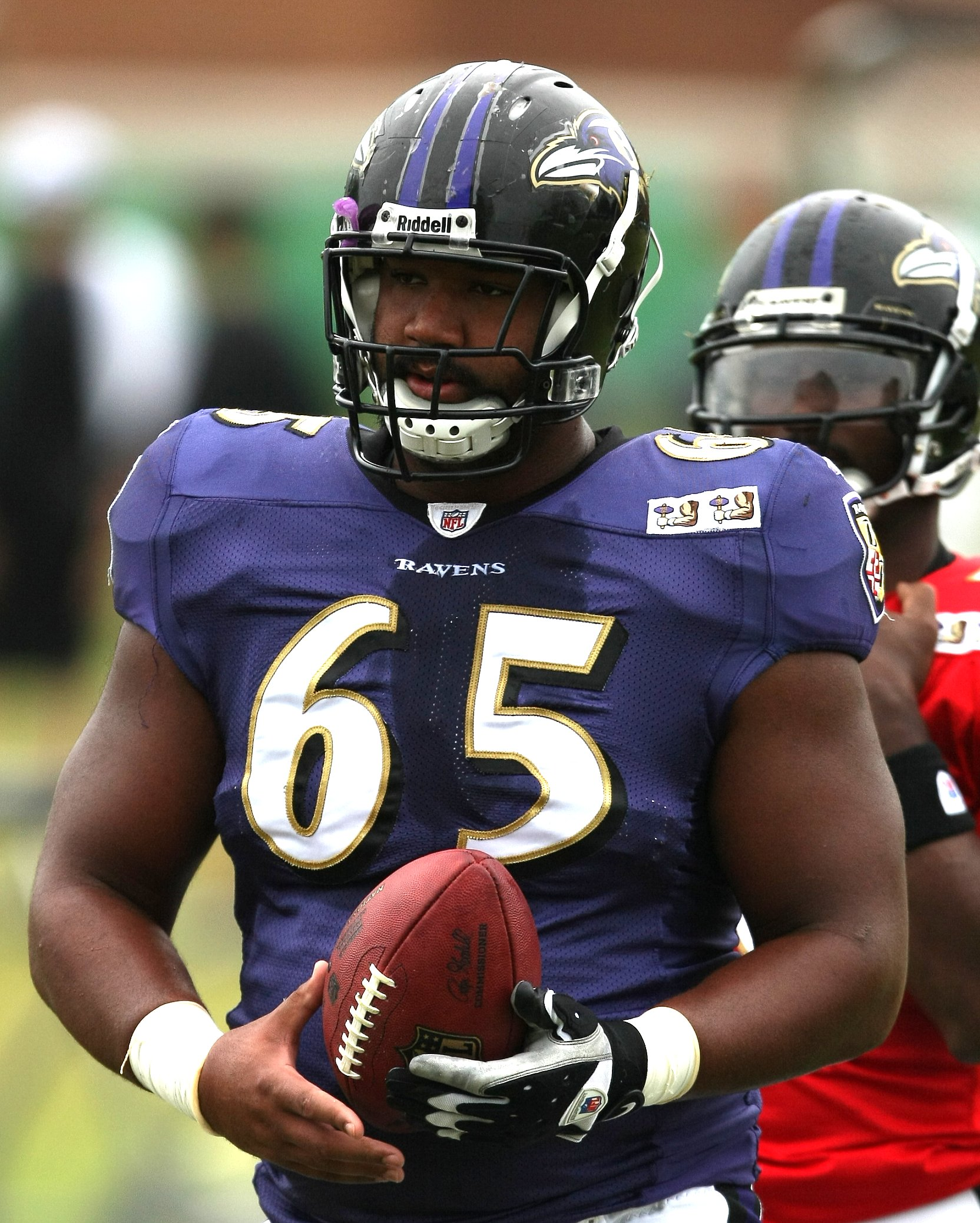
Chester in 2009 while on the Baltimore Ravens.

=== Pre-draft ===
Pre-draft measurables
| Height | Weight | Arm length | Hand span | 40-yard dash | 10-yard split | 20-yard split | 20-yard shuttle | Three-cone drill | Vertical jump | Broad jump | Bench press |
|---|---|---|---|---|---|---|---|---|---|---|---|
| 6 ft 3 3/8 in (1.91 m) | 303 lb (137 kg) | 31 3/4 in (0.81 m) | 9 1/8 in (0.23 m) | 4.87 s | 1.69 s | 2.78 s | 4.50 s | 7.31 s | 31.5 in (0.80 m) | 8 ft 10 in (2.69 m) | 27 reps |
All values from NFL Combine

=== Baltimore Ravens ===
Chester was selected by the Baltimore Ravens in the second round (56th overall) in the 2006 NFL draft. In his rookie season, he played in 11 games making four starts. He helped to protect the quarterback and only 17 sacks were allowed, the 2nd fewest in the league. He made his NFL debut at the Denver Broncos on October 9, 2006.

In 2008, Chester was converted from the offensive line to tight end and switched from No. 65 to No. 48. His first NFL action at the new position came against the Pittsburgh Steelers on September 29. He later switched back to the offensive line and No. 65 in October.

=== Washington Redskins ===
In July 2011, Chester signed a five-year contract with the Washington Redskins. He was the only member of the Redskins' offensive line to start and play in all 16 games of the 2011 season at the same position. On May 27, 2015, Chester was released. During his four-year stint with the Redskins, Chester started all 64 games.

=== Atlanta Falcons ===
On May 30, 2015, Chester signed a one-year deal with the Atlanta Falcons. He played and started in all 16 games for the Atlanta Falcons in the 2015 season. On April 20, 2016, Chester re-signed with the Falcons.

In the 2016 season, Chester and the Falcons reached Super Bowl LI on February 5, 2017, but the Falcons would fall in a 34–28 overtime defeat to the New England Patriots.

On March 31, 2017, Chester announced his retirement from the NFL.

== Personal life ==
Chester lives in Frisco, Texas with his wife and three children. He is Christian.
