= 2008 Carolina Panthers season =

NFL team season

- Owner: Jerry Richardson
- General manager: Marty Hurney
- Head coach: John Fox
- Offensive coordinator: Jeff Davidson
- Defensive coordinator: Mike Trgovac
- Home stadium: Bank of America Stadium

Results
- Record: 12–4
- Division place: 1st NFC South
- Playoffs: Lost Divisional Playoffs (vs. Cardinals) 13–33
- Pro Bowlers: WR Steve Smith; OT Jordan Gross; DE Julius Peppers; LB Jon Beason

The 2008 Carolina Panthers season was the franchise's 14th season in the National Football League (NFL). They entered the season and improved on their 7–9 record from 2007, winning the NFC South for the first time since 2003 and earning their first playoff berth since 2005. Their 12–4 finish tied their then-best record in franchise history, which occurred in the 1996 season, and later on tied in 2013; however, this would be surpassed by the 2015 club. The second-seeded Panthers were upset at home in the divisional playoffs by the eventual NFC Champion Arizona Cardinals 33–13.

== Offseason ==
=== NFL draft ===
Round	Pick	Player	Position	School/Club team
1	13	Jonathan Stewart	RB	Oregon
1	19	Jeff Otah	OT	Pittsburgh
3	67	Charles Godfrey	CB	Iowa
3	74	Dan Connor	LB	Penn State
5	141	Gary Barnidge	TE	Louisville
6	181	Nick Hayden	DT	Wisconsin
7	221	Hilee Taylor	LB	North Carolina
7	241	Geoff Schwartz	OL	Oregon
7	250	Mackenzy Bernadeau	G	Bentley

=== Free agent signings ===
Position	Player	Experience	College
RB	LaBrandon Toefield	5	LSU
RB	DeCori Birmingham	3	Arkansas
FB	Troy Fleming	4	Tennessee
WR	D.J. Hackett	4	Colorado
WR	Muhsin Muhammad	12	Michigan State
WR	Chris Hannon	2	Tennessee
WR	Dominique Thompson	3	William & Mary
CB	Ricardo Colclough	4	Tusculum
LB	Landon Johnson	4	Purdue
S	Terrence Holt	5	N.C. State
G	Rueben Riley	1	Michigan
G	Keydrick Vincent	7	Mississippi
G	Milford Brown	6	Florida State
G	Toniu Fonoti	6	Nebraska
DE	Tyler Brayton	5	Colorado
DT	Steve Williams	2	Northwest Missouri State
DT	Darwin Walker	8	Tennessee
DT	Ian Scott	5	Florida

==== Roster releases ====
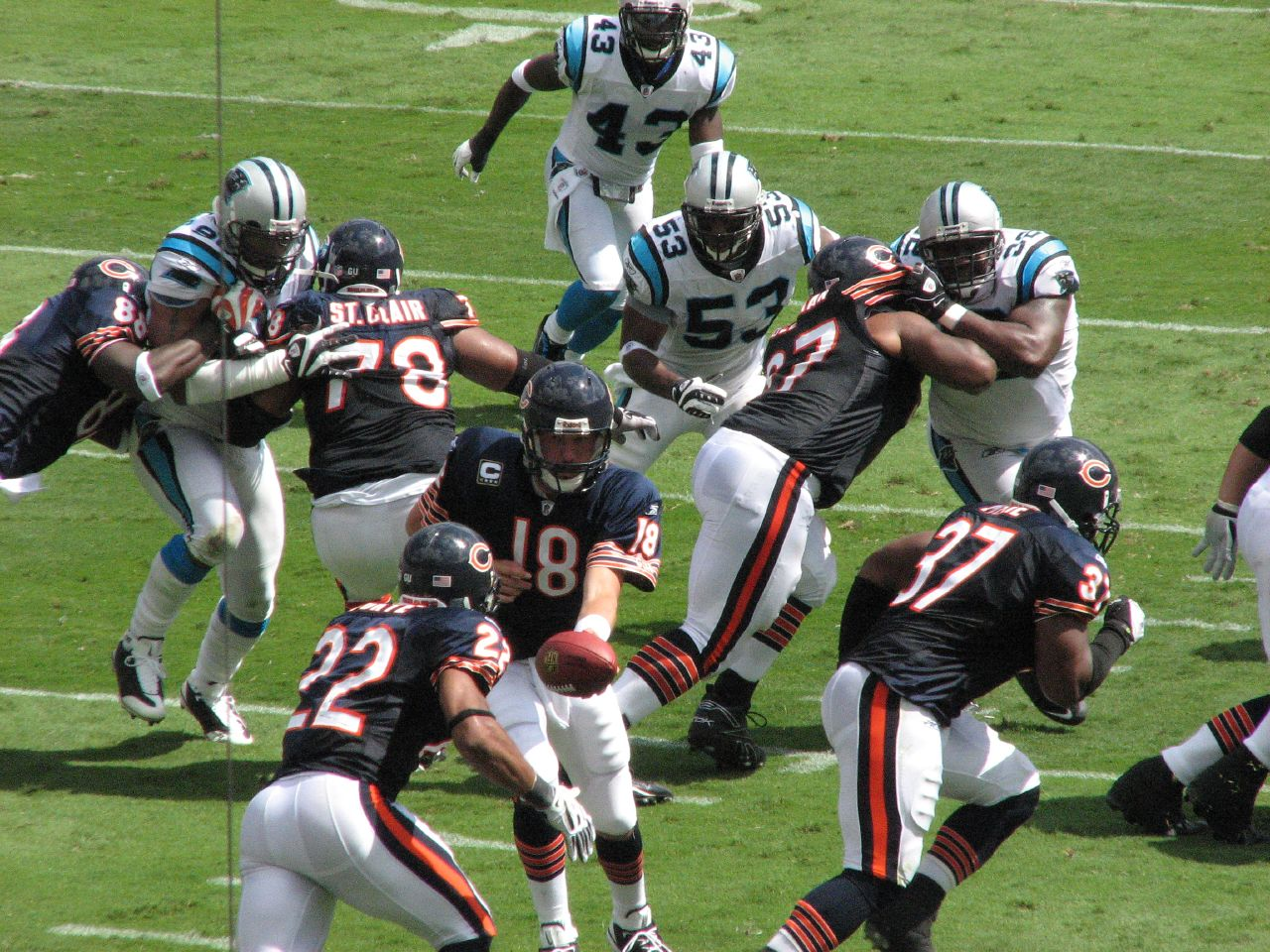
Carolina on defense against the Chicago Bears in week 2 of the 2008 season

Position	Player
CB	Patrick Dendy
LB	Dan Morgan
S	Marquand Manuel
DT	Kris Jenkins
DT	Kindal Moorehead
C	Justin Hartwig
LG	Mike Wahle
WR	Drew Carter
WR	Keary Colbert
RB	DeShaun Foster
QB	David Carr

== Staff ==
2008 Carolina Panthers staff
Front office: Owner/founder – Jerry Richardson; President – Mark Richardson; General manager – Marty Hurney; Director of college scouting – Don Gregory; Director of pro scouting – Mark Koncz; Head coaches: Head coach – John Fox; Assistant head coach/running backs – Jim Skipper; Offensive coaches: Offensive coordinator – Jeff Davidson; Passing game coordinator/quarterbacks – Mike McCoy; Wide receivers – Richard Williamson; Offensive line – Dave Magazu; Offensive quality control/tight ends – Geep Chryst	Defensive coaches: Defensive coordinator – Mike Trgovac; Defensive line – Sal Sunseri; Linebackers – Ken Flajole; Defensive Backs (Secondary) – Tim Lewis; Safeties – Mike Gillhamer; Defensive quality control – Sam Mills III; Special teams coaches: Special teams coordinator – Danny Crossman; Special teams assistant/assistant strength and conditioning – Matt House; Strength and conditioning: Strength and conditioning – Jerry Simmons

== Final roster ==
2008 Carolina Panthers roster
Quarterbacks (QB): 17 Jake Delhomme; 12 Josh McCown; 3 Matt Moore; Running backs (RB): 37 Nick Goings; 45 Brad Hoover FB; 28 Jonathan Stewart KR; 34 DeAngelo Williams; Wide receivers (WR): 18 D. J. Hackett; 80 Dwayne Jarrett; 84 Mark Jones RS; 81 Kenneth Moore; 87 Muhsin Muhammad; 89 Steve Smith; Tight ends (TE): 82 Gary Barnidge; 47 Jeff King; 88 Dante Rosario	Offensive linemen (OL): 65 Mackenzy Bernadeau G; 73 Jeremy Bridges T; 69 Jordan Gross T; 63 Geoff Hangartner C/G; 67 Ryan Kalil C; 76 Frank Omiyale T; 79 Jeff Otah T; 70 Travelle Wharton G; Defensive linemen (DL): 96 Tyler Brayton DE; 78 Nick Hayden DT; 95 Charles Johnson DE; 99 Maʻake Kemoeatu DT; 92 Damione Lewis DT; 98 J'Vonne Parker DT; 90 Julius Peppers DE; 66 Hilee Taylor DE; 93 Darwin Walker DT	Linebackers (LB): 50 James Anderson OLB; 52 Jon Beason MLB; 55 Donté Curry OLB; 58 Thomas Davis OLB; 53 Na'il Diggs OLB; 54 Landon Johnson OLB; 59 Adam Seward MLB; Defensive backs (DB): 20 Chris Gamble CB; 30 Charles Godfrey FS; 43 Chris Harris SS; 21 Ken Lucas CB; 31 Richard Marshall CB; 25 Nate Salley FS; 26 Quinton Teal SS; 23 Dante Wesley CB; 27 C. J. Wilson CB; Special teams (ST): 7 Jason Baker P; 4 John Kasay K; 56 Jason Kyle LS; 5 Rhys Lloyd KOS	Practice squad: 14 Brett Basanez QB; 24 DeCori Birmingham RB; 64 Casper Brinkley DE; 38 Joe Fields S; 15 Kevin McMahan WR; 77 Jonathan Palmer T; 74 Geoff Schwartz T; 94 Lorenzo Williams DT; Reserve: 11 Jason Carter WR (IR); 57 Dan Connor LB (IR); 91 Gary Gibson DT (IR); 10 Ryne Robinson WR (IR); 68 Keydrick Vincent G (IR); Rookies in italics 53 active, 5 reserve, 8 practice squad

== Schedule ==
=== Preseason ===
Week	Date	Opponent	Results		Game Site	TV	NFL Recap
Week	Date	Opponent	Final score	Team record	Game Site	TV	NFL Recap
1	Saturday, Aug. 9	Indianapolis Colts	**W** 23–20 (OT)	1–0	Bank of America Stadium	Don Fischer, Mark Herrman, Jeffrey Gorman/Gary Williams, Steve Beuerlein, Pete Yanity	Recap
2	Thursday, Aug. 14	Philadelphia Eagles	**L** 24–13	1–1	Lincoln Financial Field	Joe Buck, Troy Aikman, Pam Oliver, Chris Myers	Recap
3	Saturday, Aug. 23	Washington Redskins	**W** 47–3	2–1	Bank of America Stadium	Mike Patrick, Joe Theismann, Kelli Johnson/Gary Williams, Steve Beuerlein, Pete Yanity	Recap
4	Thursday, Aug. 28	Pittsburgh Steelers	**L** 19–16	2–2	Heinz Field	Gary Williams, Steve Beuerlein, Pete Yanity/Bob Pompeani, Edmund Nelson, Jeff Verszyala	Recap

=== Regular season ===
Week	Date	Opponent	Results		Game Site	NFL Recap
Week	Date	Opponent	Final score	Team record	Game Site	NFL Recap
1	September 7, 2008	at San Diego Chargers	**W** 26–24	1–0	Qualcomm Stadium	Recap
2	September 14, 2008	Chicago Bears	**W** 20–17	2–0	Bank of America Stadium	Recap
3	September 21, 2008	at Minnesota Vikings	**L** 10–20	2–1	Hubert H. Humphrey Metrodome	Recap
4	September 28, 2008	**Atlanta Falcons**	**W** 24–9	3–1	Bank of America Stadium	Recap
5	October 5, 2008	Kansas City Chiefs	**W** 34–0	4–1	Bank of America Stadium	Recap
6	October 12, 2008	at **Tampa Bay Buccaneers**	**L** 3–27	4–2	Raymond James Stadium	Recap
7	October 19, 2008	**New Orleans Saints**	**W** 30–7	5–2	Bank of America Stadium	Recap
8	October 26, 2008	Arizona Cardinals	**W** 27–23	6–2	Bank of America Stadium	Recap
9	Bye Week					
10	November 9, 2008	at Oakland Raiders	**W** 17–6	7–2	Oakland–Alameda County Coliseum	Recap
11	November 16, 2008	Detroit Lions	**W** 31–22	8–2	Bank of America Stadium	Recap
12	November 23, 2008	at **Atlanta Falcons**	**L** 28–45	8–3	Georgia Dome	Recap
13	November 30, 2008	at Green Bay Packers	**W** 35–31	9–3	Lambeau Field	Recap
14	December 8 (Monday)	**Tampa Bay Buccaneers**	**W** 38–23	10–3	Bank of America Stadium	Recap
15	December 14, 2008	Denver Broncos	**W** 30–10	11–3	Bank of America Stadium	Recap
16	December 21, 2008	at New York Giants	**L** 28–34 (OT)	11–4	Giants Stadium	Recap
17	December 28, 2008	at **New Orleans Saints**	**W** 33–31	12–4	Louisiana Superdome	Recap
NOTES: Division games are in **bold** text. All game dates are on Sunday unless indicated otherwise.

=== Postseason ===
Week	Date	Opponent	Results		Game Site	NFL Recap
Week	Date	Opponent	Final score	Team record	Game Site	NFL Recap
Wild Card	Bye Week					
**Divisional**	January 10, 2009	Arizona Cardinals (4)	**L** 13–33	0–1	Bank of America Stadium	Recap

== Standings ==
NFC South
	W	L	T	PCT	DIV	CONF	PF	PA	STK
^{(2)} Carolina Panthers	12	4	0	.750	4–2	8–4	414	329	W1
^{(5)} Atlanta Falcons	11	5	0	.688	3–3	8–4	391	325	W3
Tampa Bay Buccaneers	9	7	0	.563	3–3	8–4	361	323	L4
New Orleans Saints	8	8	0	.500	2–4	5–7	463	393	L1

== Regular season results ==
=== Week 1: at San Diego Chargers ===
Quarter	1	2	3	4	Total
Panthers	0	9	7	10	26
Chargers	0	7	3	14	24

at Qualcomm Stadium, San Diego, California

- Game time: 4:15 PM EST/1:15 PM PST
- Game weather: Temp: 81 °F (27 °C), Humidity: 63%, Wind WSW 8 mph (13 km/h)
- Game attendance: 67,115
- Referee: Walt Anderson
- TV announcers (Fox): Dick Stockton, Brian Baldinger, & Laura Okmin

The Carolina Panthers and San Diego Chargers were locked in a defensive battle in the first quarter. John Kasay made three field goals (44, 33, 30) while Philip Rivers connected with Chris Chambers on a 44-yard pass to score. At halftime the score was 9–7, in favor of the Panthers. Nate Kaeding hit a 27-yard field goal to put the Chargers up 10–9, before Chris Gamble recovered a fumble by TE Antonio Gates, giving the Panthers a lead of 16–10. Another John Kasay field goal would make it a two-score game, before Philip Rivers would hit Antonio Gates and Vincent Jackson for 24 and 5-yard touchdown passes, respectively. With 0:02 on the game clock, Panthers quarterback Jake Delhomme hit tight end Dante Rosario on a 14-yard pass to give the Panthers the win and a 1–0 start.

=== Week 2: vs. Chicago Bears ===
Quarter	1	2	3	4	Total
Bears	7	3	7	0	17
Panthers	0	3	10	7	20

at Bank of America Stadium, Charlotte, North Carolina

- Game time: 1:00 PM EST
- Game weather: 84 °F (29 °C) (Cloudy)
- Game attendance: 73,828
- Referee: Ron Winter
- TV announcers (FOX): Sam Rosen, Tim Ryan, & Chris Myers

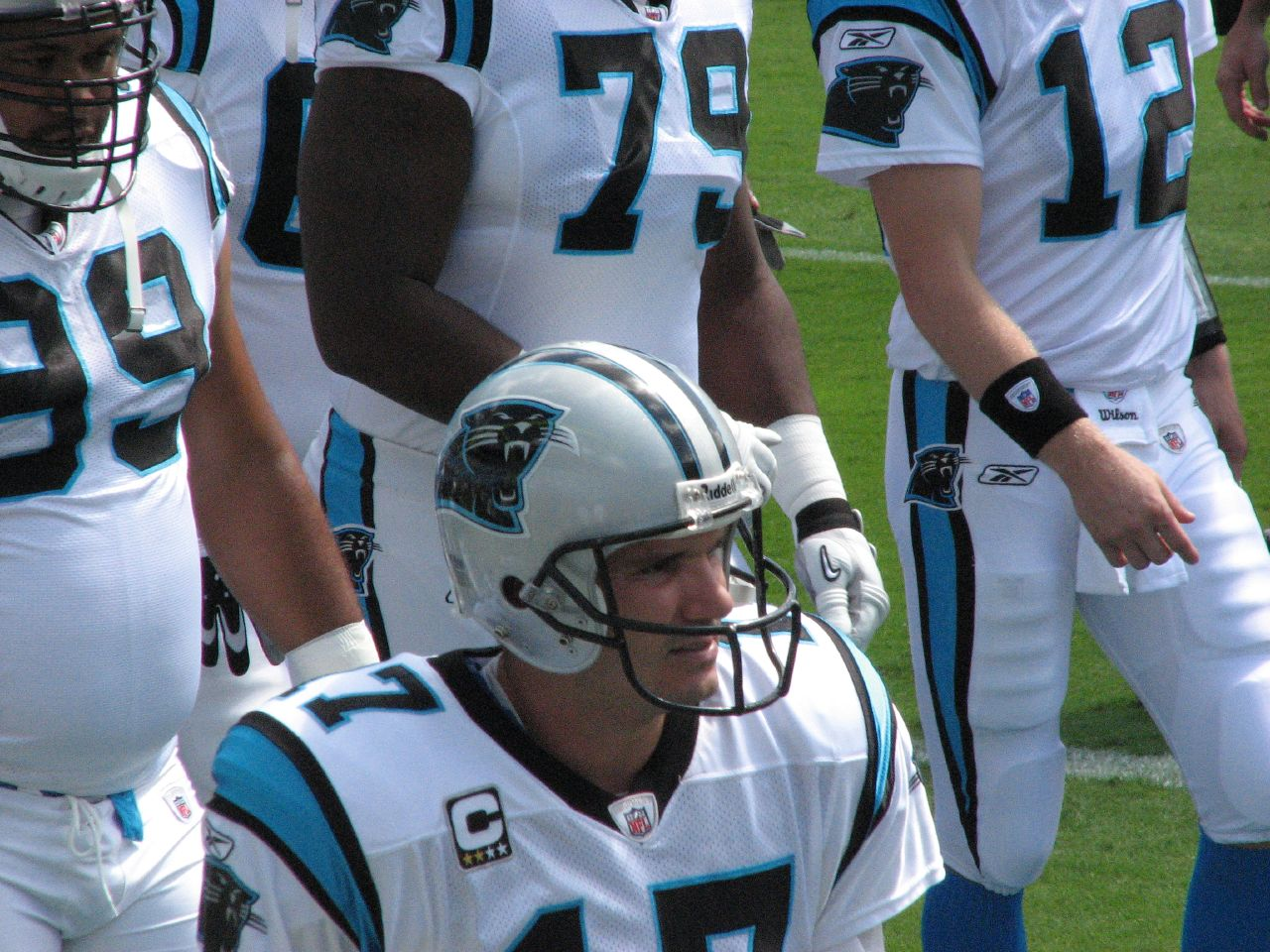
Delhomme and the Panthers leave the field in week 2

The Bears and Panthers squared off and it was defensive. The lone score of the first quarter came when Brandon Lloyd recovered a blocked punt and took it nine yards to score. Each team was able to score a field goal as Robbie Gould and John Kasay hit field goals from 26 and 37 yards, respectively. Jason McKie scored a touchdown for the Bears to open the second half, and John Kasay nailed a 45-yard field goal. Jonathan Stewart was able to get into the endzone for his first career touchdown. In the fourth quarter, another Jonathan Stewart run gave the Carolina Panthers the lead and eventually, the victory.

With the win, the Panthers improved to 2–0.

Also, WR Muhsin Muhammad (5 receptions for 59 yards) became the 29th player in NFL history to amass 10,000 career receiving yards.

=== Week 3: at Minnesota Vikings ===
Quarter	1	2	3	4	Total
Panthers	3	7	0	0	10
Vikings	0	10	7	3	20

at Hubert H. Humphrey Metrodome, Minneapolis, Minnesota

- Game time: 1:00 PM EST/10:00 AM PST
- Game weather: None (Domed Stadium)
- Game attendance: 62,628
- Referee: John Parry
- TV announcers (Fox): Ron Pitts, Tony Boselli, & Charissa Thompson

Coming off their home win over the Bears, the Panthers flew to the Hubert H. Humphrey Metrodome for a Week 3 duel with the Minnesota Vikings. This game would also be WR Steve Smith's first game of the year, coming off his 2-game suspension.

In the first quarter, Carolina got the early lead with kicker John Kasay getting a 43-yard field goal. In the second quarter, the Panthers increased their lead with rookie RB Jonathan Stewart getting a 2-yard TD run. The Vikings responded with kicker Ryan Longwell's 28-yard field goal and CB Antoine Winfield returning a fumble 19 yards for a touchdown. In the third quarter, Minnesota took the lead with QB Gus Frerotte completing a 34-yard TD pass to TE Visanthe Shiancoe. In the fourth quarter, the Vikings sealed the win with Longwell nailing a 32-yard field goal.

With the loss, Carolina fell to 2–1.

=== Week 4: vs. Atlanta Falcons ===
Quarter	1	2	3	4	Total
Falcons	3	6	0	0	9
Panthers	7	7	3	7	24

at Bank of America Stadium, Charlotte, North Carolina

- Game time: 1:00 PM EST
- Game weather: 80 °F (27 °C) (Partly Cloudy)
- Game attendance: 72,688
- Referee: Ed Hochuli
- TV announcers (Fox): Ron Pitts, Tony Boselli, & Charissa Thompson

Hoping to rebound from their road loss to the Vikings, the Panthers went home for a Week 4 NFC South duel with the Atlanta Falcons. In the first quarter, Carolina pounced first with rookie RB Jonathan Stewart getting an 8-yard TD run. The Falcons responded with kicker Jason Elam getting a 33-yard field goal. In the second quarter, Atlanta crept closer as Elam kicked a 33-yard field goal. Carolina would reply with QB Jake Delhomme completing a 56-yard TD pass to WR Steve Smith. The Falcons closed out the half with Elam getting a 44-yard field goal.

In the third quarter, the Panthers answered with kicker John Kasay nailing a 44-yard field goal. In the fourth quarter, Carolina closed the game out with Delhomme completing a 36-yard TD pass to WR Muhsin Muhammad.

With the win, the Panthers improved to 3–1.

During the game, Muhsin Muhammad (8 receptions for 147 yards and a touchdown) became the Panthers All-Time WR Leader in Receptions (600) and TD Receptions (45).

=== Week 5: vs. Kansas City Chiefs ===
Quarter	1	2	3	4	Total
Chiefs	0	0	0	0	0
Panthers	7	14	10	3	34

at Bank of America Stadium, Charlotte, North Carolina

- Game time: 1:00 PM EST
- Game weather: 79 °F (26 °C) (Sunny)
- Game attendance: 72,319
- Referee: Terry McAulay
- TV announcers (CBS): Kevin Harlan & Rich Gannon

Coming off their divisional win over the Falcons, the Panthers stayed at home for a Week 5 interconference duel with the Kansas City Chiefs. In the first quarter, Carolina pounced first as RB DeAngelo Williams got a 10-yard TD run. In the second quarter, the Panthers continued its attack as Williams caught a 25-yard TD pass from QB Jake Delhomme and even got a 32-yard TD run. In the third quarter, Carolina increased its lead with kicker John Kasay getting a 32-yard field goal, along with Delhomme completing a 47-yard TD pass to WR Muhsin Muhammad. In the fourth quarter, the Panthers sealed their shutout win with Kasay nailing a 43-yard field goal.

With the win, Carolina improved to 4–1.

=== Week 6: at Tampa Bay Buccaneers ===
Quarter	1	2	3	4	Total
Panthers	0	3	0	0	3
Buccaneers	14	3	3	7	27

at Raymond James Stadium, Tampa, Florida

- Game time: 1:00 PM EST
- Game weather: 84 °F (29 °C) (Cloudy)
- Game attendance: 64,211
- Referee: Carl Cheffers
- TV announcers (Fox): Matt Vasgersian, Brian Baldinger, & Charissa Thompson

Coming off their shutout home win over the Chiefs, the Panthers flew to Raymond James Stadium for a Week 6 NFC South duel with Tampa Bay Buccaneers. In the first quarter, Carolina trailed early as Buccaneers LB Geno Hayes returned a blocked punt 22 yards for a touchdown, along with QB Jeff Garcia completing a 2-yard TD pass to TE Alex Smith. In the second quarter, the Panthers got on the board with kicker John Kasay getting a 20-yard field goal, yet Tampa Bay answered with kicker Matt Bryant getting a 37-yard field goal. In the third quarter, the Buccaneers increased their lead as Bryant nailed a 49-yard field goal. In the fourth quarter, Tampa Bay sealed the win with RB Earnest Graham getting a 1-yard TD run.

With the loss, Carolina fell to 4–2.

=== Week 7: vs. New Orleans Saints ===
Quarter	1	2	3	4	Total
Saints	0	7	0	0	7
Panthers	3	10	14	3	30

at Bank of America Stadium, Charlotte, North Carolina

- Game time: 1:00 PM EDT
- Game weather: 61 °F (16 °C) (Sunny)
- Game attendance: 73,687
- Referee: Peter Morelli
- TV announcers (Fox): Matt Vasgersian, Brian Baldinger, Brian Billick & Laura Okmin

Hoping to rebound from their divisional road loss to the Buccaneers, the Panthers went home for a Week 7 NFC South duel with the New Orleans Saints. In the first quarter, Carolina pounced first as kicker John Kasay got a 39-yard field goal. In the second quarter, the Saints took the lead as FB Mike Karney got a 1-yard TD run. The Panthers regained the lead as rookie RB Jonathan Stewart got an 18-yard TD run, along with Kasay getting a 48-yard field goal.

In the third quarter, Carolina continued its domination as QB Jake Delhomme completed a 39-yard TD pass to WR Steve Smith, along with a 4-yard TD pass to RB DeAngelo Williams. In the fourth quarter, the Panthers closed out the game as Kasay nailed a 28-yard field goal.

With the win, Carolina improved to 5–2.

=== Week 8: vs. Arizona Cardinals ===
Quarter	1	2	3	4	Total
Cardinals	3	7	13	0	23
Panthers	0	3	21	3	27

at Bank of America Stadium, Charlotte, North Carolina

- Game time: 1:00 p.m. EDT
- Game weather: 64 °F (18 °C) (Sunny)
- Game attendance: 72,010
- Referee: Walt Coleman
- TV announcers (Fox): Matt Vasgersian, Brian Baldinger, & Laura Okmin

Coming off their win over the Saints, the Panthers stayed at home for a Week 8 duel with the Arizona Cardinals. In the first quarter, Carolina trailed early as Cardinals kicker Neil Rackers got a 21-yard field goal. In the second quarter, Arizona increased its lead as QB Kurt Warner completed a 5-yard TD pass to WR Anquan Boldin. The Panthers got on the board with kicker John Kasay getting a 23-yard field goal.

In the third quarter, the Cardinals increased their lead as RB Tim Hightower got a 2-yard TD run. Carolina started to rally as RB DeAngelo Williams got a 15-yard TD run, while QB Jake Delhomme completed an 18-yard TD pass to WR Steve Smith. Arizona responded with Warner completing a 2-yard TD pass to Boldin (with a failed PAT), yet the Panthers got the lead with Delhomme hooking up with Smith again on a 65-yard TD pass. In the fourth quarter, Carolina completed its rally as Kasay nailed a 50-yard field goal.

With the win, the Panthers went into their bye week at 6–2.

=== Week 10: at Oakland Raiders ===
Quarter	1	2	3	4	Total
Panthers	7	7	0	3	17
Raiders	0	0	6	0	6

at Oakland–Alameda County Coliseum, Oakland, California

- Game time: 4:05 PM EST
- Game weather: 62 °F (17 °C) (Sunny)
- Game attendance: 47,888
- Referee: Mike Carey
- TV announcers (Fox): Dick Stockton, Brian Baldinger, Brian Billick, & Laura Okmin

Coming off their bye week, the Panthers flew to Oakland–Alameda County Coliseum for a Week 10 interconference duel with the Oakland Raiders. In the first quarter, Carolina pounced first as QB Jake Delhomme completed a 3-yard TD pass to WR Muhsin Muhammad. In the second quarter, the Panthers increased their lead as RB DeAngelo Williams got a 69-yard TD run. In the third quarter, the Raiders responded with kicker Sebastian Janikowski getting a 38-yard and a 45-yard field goal. In the fourth quarter, Carolina closed the game out with kicker John Kasay nailing a 32-yard field goal.

With the win, the Panthers improved to 7–2.

=== Week 11: vs. Detroit Lions ===
Quarter	1	2	3	4	Total
Lions	7	9	0	6	22
Panthers	0	21	3	7	31

at Bank of America Stadium, Charlotte, North Carolina

- Game time: 1:00 PM EST
- Game weather: 52 °F (11 °C) (Sunny)
- Game attendance: 73,349
- Referee: Bill Leavy
- TV announcers (Fox): Ron Pitts, Tony Boselli, & Charissa Thompson

Coming off their road win over the Raiders, the Panthers went home for a Week 11 duel with the winless Detroit Lions. In the first quarter, Carolina trailed early as Lions QB Daunte Culpepper completed a 29-yard TD pass to WR Calvin Johnson. In the second quarter, Detroit increased their lead as kicker Jason Hanson got a 40-yard field goal. The Panthers got on the board as QB Jake Delhomme completed a 15-yard TD pass to TE Jeff King. The Lions would answer with Hanson making a 56-yard field goal, yet Carolina took the lead with RB DeAngelo Williams getting a 56-yard TD run, while rookie RB Jonathan Stewart got a 22-yard TD run. Detroit ended the half with Hanson getting a 27-yard field goal.

In the third quarter, the Panthers increased their lead as kicker John Kasay nailed a 29-yard field goal. In the fourth quarter, the Lions tried to rally as Culpepper got a 1-yard TD run (with a failed 2-point conversion), yet Carolina pulled away with Williams getting a 4-yard TD run.

With the win, the Panthers improved to 8–2.

=== Week 12: at Atlanta Falcons ===
Quarter	1	2	3	4	Total
Panthers	0	3	10	15	28
Falcons	10	7	0	28	45

at Georgia Dome, Atlanta, Georgia

- Game time: 4:15 PM EST
- Game weather: None (Domed Stadium)
- Game attendance: 64,841
- Referee: Tony Corrente
- TV announcers (Fox): Thom Brennaman & Brian Billick

Coming off their record-setting win over the Lions, the Panthers flew to the Georgia Dome for a Week 12 NFC South rematch with the Atlanta Falcons. In the first quarter, Carolina trailed early as Falcons kicker Jason Elam made a 23-yard field goal, while WR Harry Douglas got a 7-yard TD run. In the second quarter, the Panthers continued to trail as RB Michael Turner got a 1-yard TD run. Carolina would close out the half as kicker John Kasay got a 23-yard field goal.

In the third quarter, the Panthers began to make the game interesting. RB DeAngelo Williams would get a 5-yard TD run, followed by Kasay nailing a 21-yard field goal. In the fourth quarter, Atlanta replied with Turner getting a 4-yard TD run. Carolina answered with QB Jake Delhomme getting a 12-yard TD run (followed up by Williams' 2-point conversion run), but the Falcons responded with Turner's 1-yard TD run, along with Douglas returning a punt 61 yards for a touchdown. The Panthers tried to come back as Delhomme completed a 16-yard TD pass to WR Muhsin Muhammad. However, Atlanta pulled away as Turner got a 16-yard TD run.

With the loss, Carolina fell to 8–3.

=== Week 13: at Green Bay Packers ===
Quarter	1	2	3	4	Total
Panthers	7	14	0	14	35
Packers	0	10	11	10	31

at Lambeau Field, Green Bay, Wisconsin

- Game time: 1:00 p.m. EDT
- Game weather: 37 °F (3 °C) (Cloudy)
- Game attendance: 70,297
- Referee: Gene Steratore
- TV announcers (Fox): Sam Rosen, Tim Ryan, & Chris Myers

Hoping to rebound from their divisional road loss to the Falcons, the Panthers flew to Lambeau Field for a Week 13 duel with the Green Bay Packers. In the first quarter, Carolina pounced first as RB DeAngelo Williams got a 1-yard TD run. In the second quarter, the Packers responded with kicker Mason Crosby getting a 32-yard field goal. The Panthers would answer with QB Jake Delhomme getting a 1-yard TD run. Green Bay replied with QB Aaron Rodgers completing a 6-yard TD pass to WR Donald Driver, yet Carolina ended the half with Williams getting another 1-yard TD run.

In the third quarter, the Packers tied the game as Crosby made a 44-yard field goal, while Rodgers completed a 5-yard TD pass to TE Donald Lee (along with a successful 2-point conversion pass to WR Greg Jennings). In the fourth quarter, Green Bay took the lead as Rodgers hooked up with Jennings on a 21-yard TD pass, yet the Panthers answered with Williams getting his third 1-yard TD run. The Packers would retake the lead as Crosby nailed a 19-yard field goal, yet Carolina sealed the victory with Williams getting his fourth 1-yard TD run (setting the single-game franchise record for the most rushing touchdowns).

With the win, the Panthers improved to 9–3.

=== Week 14: vs. Tampa Bay Buccaneers ===
Quarter	1	2	3	4	Total
Buccaneers	0	3	14	6	23
Panthers	3	7	7	21	38

at Bank of America Stadium, Charlotte, North Carolina

- Game time: 8:30 p.m. EST
- Game weather: 44 °F (7 °C) (Cloudy)
- Game attendance: 74,113
- Referee: Walt Anderson
- TV announcers (ESPN): Mike Tirico, Ron Jaworski, Tony Kornheiser, Michele Tafoya, & Suzy Kolber

The Panthers would run wild, literally, as they would amass a team record 299 yards on the ground (186 of them from DeAngelo Williams, 115 from Jonathan Stewart). Both Stewart and Williams had two touchdowns apiece, as Tampa Bay failed to tackle the dynamic duo. Steve Smith also had a good day, adding 117 yards and a TD. Although Jake Delhomme was intercepted twice, Tampa was unable to fully capitalize, despite a career day for Antonio Bryant, who finished with 200 yards and two scores.

With this victory, Carolina avenged its defeat by Tampa earlier in the season and gained sole possession of first place in the NFC South at 10–3.

=== Week 15: vs. Denver Broncos ===
Quarter	1	2	3	4	Total
Broncos	10	0	0	0	10
Panthers	10	10	7	3	30

at Bank of America Stadium, Charlotte, North Carolina

- Game time: 4:15 p.m. EST
- Game weather: 44 °F (7 °C) (Cloudy)
- Game attendance: 73,690
- Referee: Al Riveron
- TV announcers (CBS): Dick Enberg, Randy Cross, & Dan Fouts

Coming off from their divisional win over the Buccaneers, the Panthers stayed at home for a Week 15 interconference duel with the Denver Broncos. In the first quarter, Carolina trailed early as Broncos QB Jay Cutler completed a 7-yard TD pass to RB P.J. Pope. Carolina soon responded with QB Jake Delhomme completing a 15-yard TD pass to WR Steve Smith. Denver would retake the lead with kicker Matt Prater nailing a 43-yard field goal, yet Carolina answered as kicker John Kasay ties the game with a 39-yard field goal. In the second quarter, Carolina took the lead with rookie RB Jonathan Stewart getting a 2-yard TD run. Carolina closed out the half with Kasay nailing a 44-yard field goal.

In the third quarter, Carolina increased its lead with RB DeAngelo Williams's 56-yard TD run for the only score of the period. In the fourth quarter, Carolina sealed the win with Kasay's 42-yard field goal.

With the win, Carolina improves to 11–3. This was the last time the Panthers beat the Broncos until 2022.

=== Week 16: at New York Giants ===
Quarter	1	2	3	4	OT	Total
Panthers	7	14	0	7	0	28
Giants	3	10	7	8	6	34

at Giants Stadium, East Rutherford, New Jersey

- Game time: 8:15 p.m. EST
- Game weather: 34 °F (1 °C) (Clear)
- Game attendance: 78,653
- Referee: Walt Coleman
- TV announcers (NBC): Al Michaels, John Madden & Andrea Kremer

Coming off their home win over the Broncos, the Panthers flew to Giants Stadium for a crucial Week 16 battle with the defending Super Bowl champion New York Giants, where the winner would lock up the NFC's #1 seed. This was also Carolina's second appearance on NBC's Sunday Night Football.

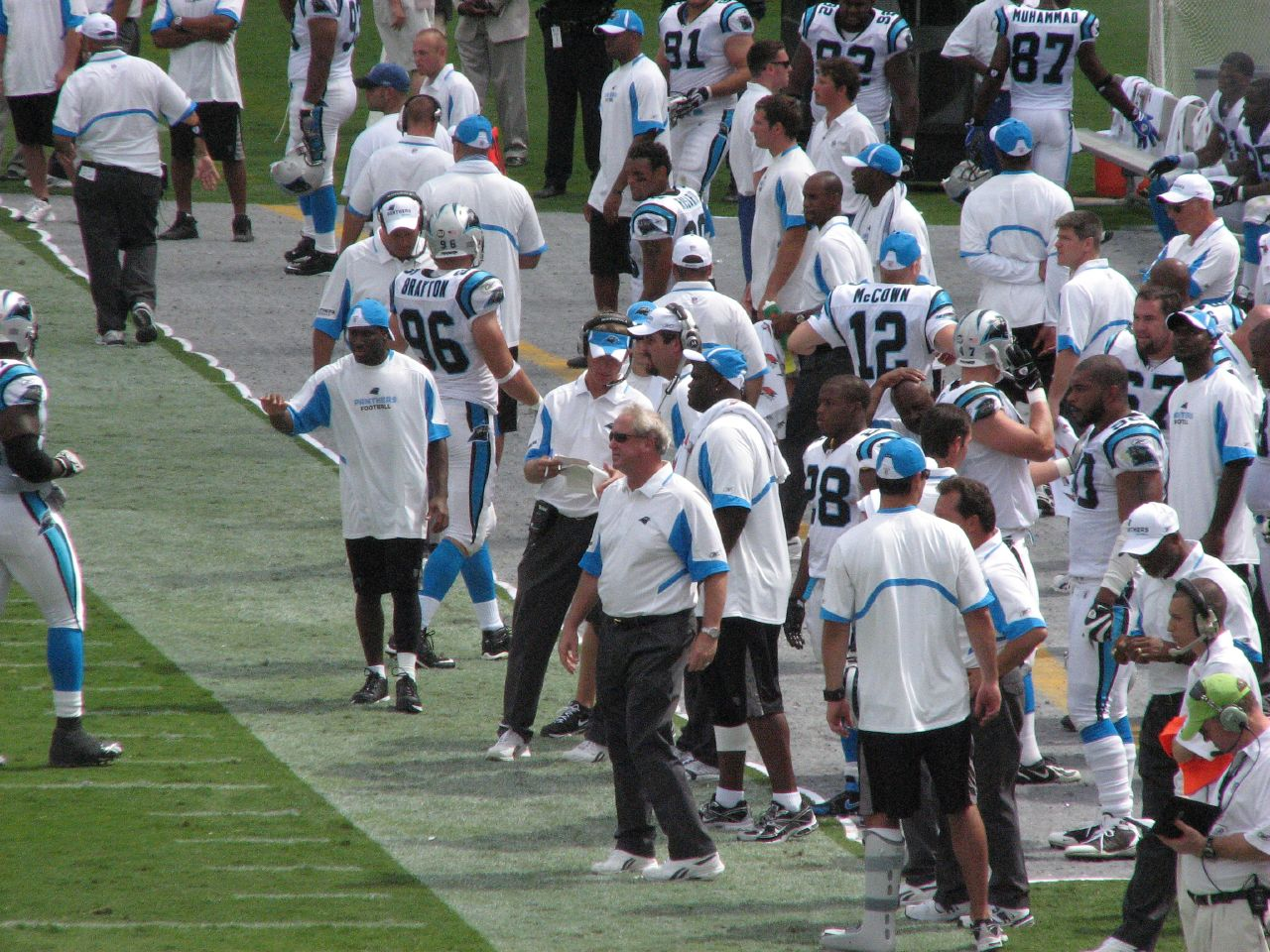
Carolina's sideline in week 2

Despite trailing early in the first quarter through Giants kicker John Carney's 32-yard field goal, Carolina would respond with running back DeAngelo Williams' 13-yard touchdown run. New York would regain the lead in the second quarter with running back Brandon Jacobs getting a 2-yard touchdown run, yet the Panthers answered right back with Williams getting a 5-yard and a 1-yard touchdown run. The Giants would close out the first half with Carney nailing a 35-yard field goal.

In the third quarter, New York was gaining ground with quarterback Eli Manning completing a 4-yard touchdown pass to tight end Kevin Boss. Carolina would reply in the fourth quarter with Williams getting a 30-yard touchdown run. However, the Giants would tie the game with Jacobs getting a 1-yard touchdown run (followed by Manning's 2-point conversion pass to wide receiver Domenik Hixon). The Panthers would get a late-game drive going and tried to end the game with kicker John Kasay, but his 50-yard attempt sailed wide left. In overtime, New York would take their second possession and end the game with Jacobs' 2-yard touchdown run.

Despite falling to 11–4, Carolina would get a playoff berth, due in part to the Cowboys losing to the Ravens.

=== Week 17: at New Orleans Saints ===
Quarter	1	2	3	4	Total
Panthers	6	17	7	3	33
Saints	0	10	0	21	31

at Louisiana Superdome, New Orleans, Louisiana

- Game time: 1:00 PM EST
- Game weather: None (Domed Stadium)
- Game attendance: 69,999
- Referee: Jerome Boger
- TV announcers (Fox): Kenny Albert, Daryl Johnston, and Tony Siragusa

With the division title on the line, the Panthers flew to the Louisiana Superdome for a Week 17 NFC South rematch with the New Orleans Saints. Carolina would get the early first quarter lead as kicker John Kasay got a 45-yard and a 26-yard field goal. The Saints would respond in the second quarter with kicker Garrett Hartley's 21-yard field goal. Afterwards, the Panthers would get a big lead as Kasay made a 34-yard field goal, quarterback Jake Delhomme completed an 8-yard touchdown pass to wide receiver Muhsin Muhammad, and cornerback Dante Wesley returning a fumble 12 yards for a touchdown. New Orleans would end the half with quarterback Drew Brees completing a 26-yard touchdown pass to wide receiver Marques Colston.

In the third quarter, Carolina would add onto their lead with rookie running back Jonathan Stewart's 2-yard touchdown run. However, in the fourth quarter, the Saints rallied to take the lead as Brees completed a 7-yard touchdown pass to wide receiver Robert Meachem, along with a 9-yard and a 13-yard touchdown pass to wide receiver Lance Moore. Fortunately, the Panthers got the last laugh as Kasay nailed the game-winning 42-yard field goal.

With the win, not only did Carolina close out the regular season at 12–4, but they also won the NFC South division crown and the NFC's #2 seed.

== Playoffs ==
=== NFC Divisional Round: vs. Arizona Cardinals ===
Quarter	1	2	3	4	Total
Cardinals	14	13	3	3	33
Panthers	7	0	0	6	13

at Bank of America Stadium, Charlotte, North Carolina

- Game time: 8:15 PM EST
- Game weather: 45 °F (7 °C) (Showers)
- Game attendance: 73,695
- Referee: Gene Steratore
- TV announcers (Fox): Kenny Albert, Daryl Johnston, & Tony Siragusa

Entering the postseason as the NFC's #2 seed, the Panthers began their playoff run at home in the NFC Divisional round against the #4 Arizona Cardinals, in a rematch of their Week 8 contest.

Carolina would get off to a fast first quarter start as rookie running back Jonathan Stewart got a 9-yard touchdown run. However, the Cardinals responded with quarterback Kurt Warner completing a 3-yard touchdown pass to running back Tim Hightower, followed by running back Edgerrin James' 4-yard touchdown run. Arizona would take a huge lead in the second quarter as kicker Neil Rackers got a 49-yard and a 30-yard field goal, followed by Warner's 29-yard touchdown pass to wide receiver Larry Fitzgerald.

In the third quarter, the Cardinals would add onto their grand lead as Rackers made a 33-yard field goal. Arizona would end its dominating night in the fourth quarter as Rackers nailed a 20-yard field goal. The Panthers would end the game's scoring with quarterback Jake Delhomme completing an 8-yard touchdown pass to wide receiver Steve Smith.

With the disappointing loss, Carolina's season ended with an overall record of 12–5.

The Panthers' offense was plagued by Delhomme's 6 turnovers (5 interceptions and a fumble), Smith being limited to 2 catches for 43 yards & a touchdown, and the running back duo of Williams and Stewart being held to 74 combined rushing yards.
