= 2006 Minnesota Vikings season =

NFL team season

- Owner: Zygi Wilf
- Head coach: Brad Childress
- Home stadium: Hubert H. Humphrey Metrodome

Results
- Record: 6–10
- Division place: 3rd NFC North
- Playoffs: Did not qualify
- All-Pros: 2: G Steve Hutchinson (2nd team); DT Kevin Williams (1st team)
- Pro Bowlers: 4: G Steve Hutchinson; C Matt Birk; DT Kevin Williams; DT Pat Williams (bench)

Uniform
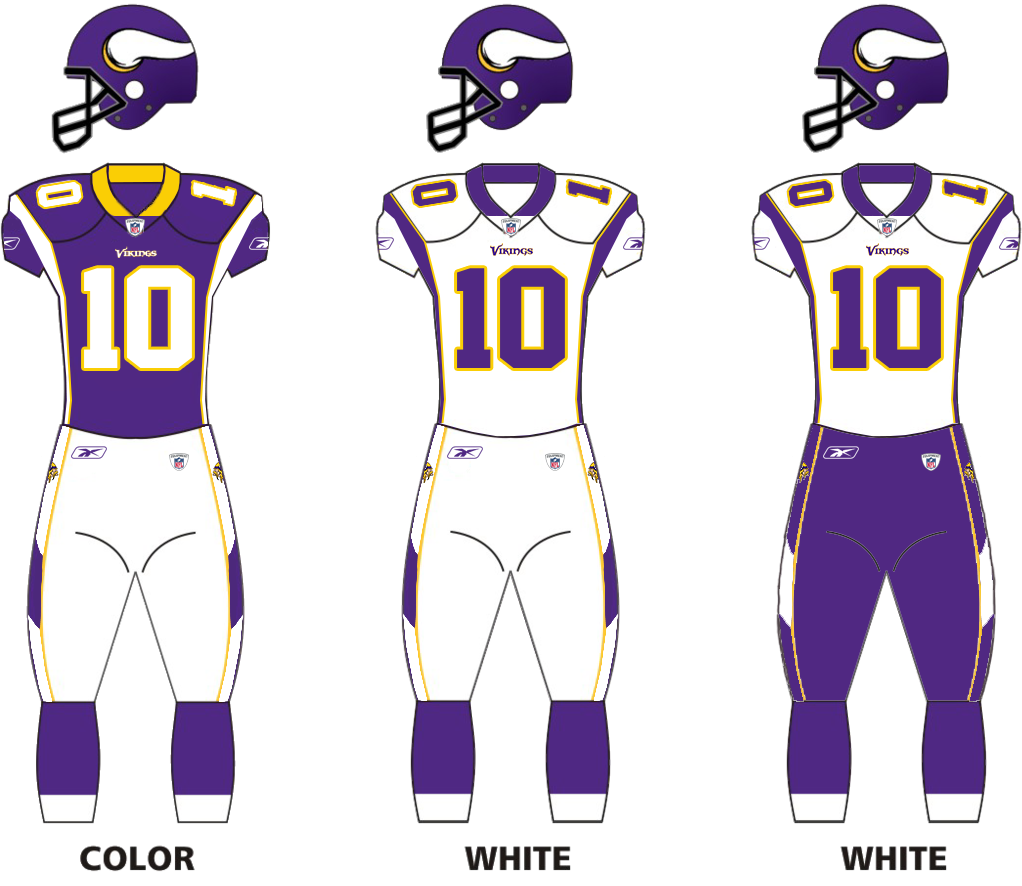

The 2006 season was the Minnesota Vikings' 46th in the National Football League (NFL). Under new head coach Brad Childress, the team finished with a 6–10 record; however, they led the league in rushing defense, surrendering only 985 rushing yards; they are one of only two franchises in NFL history to allow fewer than 1,000 rushing yards in a 16-game season (the other was the Super Bowl champion Baltimore Ravens in 2000).

== Offseason ==
On January 6, 2006, the Vikings hired Brad Childress to take over from Mike Tice as head coach, making them the first team to hire a new head coach during the 2006 offseason. Childress previously held the quarterbacks coach position with the Philadelphia Eagles from 1999 to 2002, and was the offensive coordinator from 2002 to 2005; he was also offensive coordinator for the Wisconsin Badgers from 1993 to 1999 under Barry Alvarez.

=== 2006 draft ===
Pro Bowler

2006 Minnesota Vikings Draft
Draft order		Player name	Position	College	Contract	Notes
Round	Selection	Player name	Position	College	Contract	Notes
1	17	Chad Greenway	Linebacker	Iowa	5 years	
2	48	Cedric Griffin	Cornerback	Texas	4 years	
2	51	Ryan Cook	Center	New Mexico	4 years	From Dolphins (Note: The Vikings traded QB Daunte Culpepper to the Dolphins in exchange for a second-round selection (51st overall).)
2	64	Tarvaris Jackson	Quarterback	Alabama State	4 years	From Steelers (Note: The Vikings traded two third-round selections (83rd and 95th overall) to the Steelers in exchange for a second-round selection (64th overall).)
3	83	Traded to the Pittsburgh Steelers				
3	95	Traded to the Pittsburgh Steelers				From Seahawks (Note: The Vikings received a third-round selection (95th overall) from the Seahawks as compensation for restricted free agent WR Nate Burleson.)
4	115	Traded to the Philadelphia Eagles (Note: The Vikings traded fourth- and sixth-round selections (115th and 185th overall) to the Eagles in exchange for a fourth-round selection (127th overall) and G Artis Hicks.)				
4	127	Ray Edwards	Defensive end	Purdue	4 years	From Colts, via Eagles
5	149	Greg Blue	Safety	Georgia	4 years	
6	185	Traded to the Philadelphia Eagles				
7	227	Traded to the San Diego Chargers (Note: The Vikings traded their seventh-round selection (227th overall) to the Chargers in exchange for G Toniu Fonoti.)				

=== Transactions ===
Re-signed
Player	Position	Status	Contract
Bryant McKinnie	OT	Free agent	7 years ($48.5 million)
E.J. Henderson	LB	Free agent	5 years ($25 million)
Kevin Williams	DT	Free agent	7 years ($50 million)
Cullen Loeffler	LS	Free agent	
Jeff Dugan	FB	Free agent	5 years ($4.5 million)

Additions
Player	Position	Status (previous team)	Contract
Ben Leber	LB	Free agent (SD)	5 years ($20 million)
Ryan Longwell	K	Free agent (GB)	5 years ($10 million)
Chester Taylor	RB	Free agent (BAL)	4 years ($14.1 million)
Steve Hutchinson	G	Restricted (SEA)	7 years ($49 million)
Tony Richardson	FB	Unrestricted (KC)	2 years ($2.5 million)
Tank Williams	SS	Free agent (TEN)	1 year ($900,000)
Jason Whittle	G	Free agent (NYG)	1 year ($695,000)
Ronyell Whitaker	CB	Free agent (TB)	
Dwight Smith	FS	Free agent (NO)	
Artis Hicks	G	Trade (PHI)	
Billy McMullen	WR	Trade (PHI)	
Artose Pinner	RB	Claimed off waivers (DET)	
Ross Kolodziej	DT	Free agent (ARI)	
Jason Glenn	LB	Free agent (NYJ)	
Bethel Johnson	WR	Free agent (NO)	
Rod Davis	LB	Free agent (CAR)	
Naufahu Tahi	FB	Signed from practice squad (CIN)	
Brooks Bollinger	QB	Trade (NYJ)	
Mike Hawkins	CB	Claimed off waivers (CLE)	
Martin Nance	WR	Free agent (BUF)	
Maurice Mann	WR	Free agent (SEA)	

Departures
Player	Position	Status (new team)	Contract
Michael Bennett	RB	Free agent (KC)	
Brian Williams	CB	Free agent (JAC)	
Corey Chavous	SS	Free agent (STL)	
Daunte Culpepper	QB	Trade (MIA)	
Melvin Fowler	C	Unrestricted (BUF)	
Nate Burleson	WR	Restricted free agent (SEA)	
Raonall Smith	LB	Unrestricted (STL)	
Lance Johnstone	DE	Unrestricted (OAK)	
Hank Baskett	WR	Trade (PHI)	
Shaun Hill	QB	Unrestricted (SF)	
Cory Withrow	C	Unrestricted (SD)	
Koren Robinson	WR	Free agent (GB)	
Chris Liwienski	G	Free agent (ARI)	
Dustin Fox	CB	Free agent (PHI)	
C. J. Mosley	DT	Trade (NYJ)	

== Staff ==
2006 Minnesota Vikings staff
Front office: Owner/chairman – Zygi Wilf; Owner/president – Mark Wilf; Owner/vice chairman – Leonard Wilf; Vice president of football operations – Rob Brzezinski; Vice president of player personnel – Rick Spielman; Director of player personnel – George Paton; Director of college scouting – Scott Studwell; Assistant director of college scouting – Jamaal Stephenson; Head coaches: Head coach – Brad Childress; Assistant to the head coach – Kevin Stefanski; Coaches assistant – Todd Nielson; Offensive coaches: Offensive coordinator – Darrell Bevell; Quarterbacks – Kevin Rogers; Running backs – Eric Bieniemy; Wide receivers – Darrell Wyatt; Tight ends – Jimmie Johnson; Offensive line – Pat Morris; Assistant offensive line – Jim Hueber; Offensive assistant – Clay Matchett and Chad O'Shea	Defensive coaches: Defensive coordinator – Mike Tomlin; Defensive line – Karl Dunbar; Assistant defensive line – Brendan Daly; Linebackers – Fred Pagac; Defensive backs/secondary – Joe Woods; Defensive assistant – Jeff Imamura; Special teams coaches: Special teams coordinator – Paul Ferraro; Assistant special teams – Brian Murphy; Strength and conditioning: Head athletic trainer/director of sports medicine – Eric Sugarman; Strength and conditioning – Tom Kanavy; Assistant strength and conditioning – Martin Streight; Assistant strength and conditioning – Juney Barnett

== Final roster ==
2006 Minnesota Vikings roster
Quarterbacks (QB): 9 Brooks Bollinger; 7 Tarvaris Jackson; 14 Brad Johnson; Running backs (RB): 35 Ciatrick Fason; 34 Wendell Mathis; 30 Mewelde Moore PR; 22 Artose Pinner; 38 Naufahu Tahi FB; 29 Chester Taylor; Wide receivers (WR): 11 Jason Carter; 81 Bethel Johnson KR; 12 Billy McMullen; 15 Martin Nance; 89 Travis Taylor; 82 Troy Williamson KR; Tight ends (TE): 83 Jeff Dugan; 40 Jim Kleinsasser; 45 Richard Owens; 85 Jermaine Wiggins	Offensive linemen (OL): 78 Matt Birk C; 62 Ryan Cook C; 64 Anthony Herrera G; 79 Artis Hicks G; 76 Steve Hutchinson G; 72 Marcus Johnson T; 74 Bryant McKinnie T; 75 Mike Rosenthal T; 65 Jason Whittle G; Defensive linemen (DL): 91 Ray Edwards DE; 96 Ross Kolodziej DT; 92 Jayme Mitchell DE; 98 Darrion Scott DE; 90 Khreem Smith DE; 95 Kenechi Udeze DE; 93 Kevin Williams DT; 94 Pat Williams DT	Linebackers (LB): 50 Rod Davis MLB; 59 Heath Farwell OLB; 58 Napoleon Harris MLB; 56 E. J. Henderson OLB; 51 Ben Leber OLB; 54 Dontarrious Thomas; Defensive backs (DB): 20 Greg Blue FS; 41 Charles Gordon CB; 37 Mike Hawkins CB; 31 Will Hunter SS; 42 Darren Sharper SS; 20 Dwight Smith FS; 27 Ronyell Whitaker CB; 26 Antoine Winfield CB; Special teams (ST): 5 Chris Kluwe P; 46 Cullen Loeffler LS; 8 Ryan Longwell K	Practice squad: 32 Patrick Body CB/S; -- C.J. Brooks G; 61 Alex Guerrero DT; 2 Drew Henson QB; 66 Norm Katnik C; 17 Maurice Mann WR; -- Jimmy Martin T; 24 Dimitri Patterson CB; Reserve: 36 Dovonte Edwards CB (IR); 55 Jason Glenn LB (IR); -- Joey Goodspeed FB (IR); 52 Chad Greenway LB (IR); 23 Cedric Griffin CB (IR); 99 Erasmus James DE (IR); 97 Spencer Johnson DT (IR); 49 Tony Richardson FB (IR); 21 Fred Smoot CB (NF-Inj.); 25 Tank Williams S (IR); Rookies in italics 53 active, 10 reserve, 8 practice squad

== Preseason ==
=== Schedule ===
Week	Date	Opponent	Result	Record	Venue	Attendance	NFL.com recap
1	August 14	Oakland Raiders	L 13–16	0–1	Hubert H. Humphrey Metrodome	63,278	Recap
2	August 19	at Pittsburgh Steelers	W 17–10	1–1	Heinz Field	57,813	Recap
3	August 25	Baltimore Ravens	W 30–7	2–1	Hubert H. Humphrey Metrodome	63,257	Recap
4	August 31	at Dallas Cowboys	T 10–10 (OT)	2–1–1	Texas Stadium	60,299	Recap

=== Game summaries ===
==== Week 1: vs. Oakland Raiders ====
Preseason Week 1: Oakland Raiders at Minnesota Vikings – Game summary

Quarter	1	2	3	4	Total
Raiders	6	7	0	3	16
Vikings	7	3	3	0	13

at Hubert H. Humphrey Metrodome, Minneapolis, Minnesota

- Date: August 14
- Game time: 7:10 p.m. CDT
- Game weather: None (indoor stadium)
- Game attendance: 63,278
- Referee: Bill Leavy
- Recap, Game Book

Game information

First quarter

- OAK – Sebastian Janikowski 27-yard field goal, 13:26. Raiders 3–0. Drive: 4 plays, 9 yards, 1:27.
- MIN – Tony Richardson 3-yard run (Ryan Longwell kick), 5:11. Vikings 7–3. Drive: 8 plays, 56 yards, 4:25.
- OAK – Sebastian Janikowski 55-yard field goal, 4:10. Vikings 7–6. Drive: 4 plays, 1 yard, 1:01.

Second quarter

- OAK – Johnnie Morant 67-yard pass from Andrew Walter (Sebastian Janikowski kick), 5:19. Raiders 13–7. Drive: 4 plays, 80 yards, 1:32.
- MIN – Ryan Longwell 41-yard field goal, 0:00. Raiders 13–10. Drive: 6 plays, 45 yards, 0:31.

Third quarter

- MIN – Ryan Longwell 28-yard field goal, 0:55. Tied 13–13. Drive: 12 plays, 37 yards, 4:57.

Fourth quarter

- OAK – Sebastian Janikowski 28-yard field goal, 8:30. Raiders 16–13. Drive: 13 plays, 49 yards, 7:25.

Top passers

- OAK – Andrew Walter – 10/19, 148 yards, TD, 2 INT
- MIN – J. T. O'Sullivan – 8/17, 100 yards, INT

Top rushers

- OAK – ReShard Lee – 10 rushes, 34 yards
- MIN – Tarvaris Jackson – 3 rushes, 36 yards

Top receivers

- OAK – Johnnie Morant – 5 receptions, 108 yards, TD
- MIN – Josh Davis – 3 receptions, 64 yards

==== Week 2: at Pittsburgh Steelers ====
Preseason Week 2: Minnesota Vikings at Pittsburgh Steelers – Game summary

Quarter	1	2	3	4	Total
Vikings	7	3	7	0	17
Steelers	7	0	3	0	10

at Heinz Field, Pittsburgh, Pennsylvania

- Date: August 19
- Game time: 8:15 p.m. EDT
- Game weather: Fair, 76 °F (24 °C)
- Game attendance: 57,813
- Referee: Walt Coleman
- Recap, Game Book

Game information

First quarter

- PIT – Cedrick Wilson 16-yard pass from Ben Roethlisberger (Jeff Reed kick), 10:12. Steelers 7–0. Drive: 6 plays, 55 yards, 2:32.
- MIN – Jermaine Wiggins 12-yard pass from Brad Johnson (Ryan Longwell kick), 4:38. Tied 7–7. Drive: 9 plays, 76 yards, 5:34.

Second quarter

- MIN – Ryan Longwell 38-yard field goal, 12:56. Vikings 10–7. Drive: 13 plays, 40 yards, 5:33.

Third quarter

- MIN – Jason Carter 6-yard pass from Tarvaris Jackson (Ryan Longwell kick), 9:20. Vikings 17–7. Drive: 8 plays, 56 yards, 4:12.
- PIT – Jeff Reed 32-yard field goal, 0:38. Vikings 17–10. Drive: 8 plays, 33 yards, 3:31.

Fourth quarter

- No scoring plays.

Top passers

- MIN – Tarvaris Jackson – 9/11, 80 yards, TD
- PIT – Charlie Batch – 8/14, 103 yards, INT

Top rushers

- MIN – Wendell Mathis – 8 rushes, 36 yards
- PIT – John Kuhn – 8 rushes, 30 yards

Top receivers

- MIN – Jason Carter – 2 receptions, 48 yards, TD
- PIT – Nate Washington – 3 receptions, 53 yards

==== Week 3: vs. Baltimore Ravens ====
Preseason Week 3: Baltimore Ravens at Minnesota Vikings – Game summary

Quarter	1	2	3	4	Total
Ravens	0	0	7	0	7
Vikings	3	7	3	17	30

at Hubert H. Humphrey Metrodome, Minneapolis, Minnesota

- Date: August 25
- Game time: 7:05 p.m. CDT
- Game weather: None (indoor stadium)
- Game attendance: 63,257
- Referee: Gerald Austin
- Recap, Game Book

Game information

First quarter

- MIN – Ryan Longwell 45-yard field goal, 11:47. Vikings 3–0. Drive: 7 plays, 40 yards, 3:13.

Second quarter

- MIN – Fred Smoot 69-yard interception return (Ryan Longwell kick), 4:50. Vikings 10–0.

Third quarter

- MIN – Ryan Longwell 38-yard field goal, 5:15. Vikings 13–0. Drive: 6 plays, 51 yards, 2:06.
- BAL – Kyle Boller 1-yard run (Matt Stover kick), 0:49. Vikings 13–7. Drive: 8 plays, 77 yards, 4:26.

Fourth quarter

- MIN – Jason Carter 77-yard pass from Tarvaris Jackson (Ryan Longwell kick), 11:47. Vikings 20–7. Drive: 4 plays, 89 yards, 2:01.
- MIN – Ryan Longwell 23-yard field goal, 2:21. Vikings 23–7. Drive: 7 plays, 21 yards, 2:48.
- MIN – Khreem Smith 29-yard fumble return (Ryan Longwell kick), 1:30. Vikings 30–7.

Top passers

- BAL – Kyle Boller – 9/15, 105 yards
- MIN – Brad Johnson – 9/15, 95 yards

Top rushers

- BAL – Cory Ross – 6 rushes, 23 yards
- MIN – Wendell Mathis – 10 rushes, 41 yards

Top receivers

- BAL – Clarence Moore – 2 receptions, 60 yards
- MIN – Jason Carter – 2 receptions, 107 yards, TD

==== Week 4: at Dallas Cowboys ====
Preseason Week 4: Minnesota Vikings at Dallas Cowboys – Game summary

Quarter	1	2	3	4	OT	Total
Vikings	0	7	0	3	0	10
Cowboys	0	3	0	7	0	10

at Texas Stadium, Irving, Texas

- Date: August 31
- Game time: 7:05 p.m. EDT
- Game weather: Clear, 94 °F (34 °C)
- Game attendance: 60,299
- Referee: Gene Steratore
- Recap, Game Book

Game information

First quarter

- No scoring plays.

Second quarter

- MIN – Marcus Robinson 24-yard pass from Brad Johnson (Ryan Longwell kick), 13:54. Vikings 7–0. Drive: 9 plays, 98 yards, 4:59.
- DAL – Mike Vanderjagt 22-yard field goal, 0:00. Vikings 7–3. Drive: 12 plays, 76 yards, 3:07.

Third quarter

- No scoring plays.

Fourth quarter

- MIN – Ryan Longwell 24-yard field goal, 6:09. Vikings 10–3. Drive: 13 plays, 68 yards, 7:27.
- DAL – Tyson Thompson 2-yard pass from Tony Romo (Mike Vanderjagt kick), 0:17. Tied 10–10. Drive: 13 plays, 80 yards, 5:52.

Overtime

- No scoring plays.

Top passers

- MIN – Brad Johnson – 11/13, 135 yards, TD
- DAL – Tony Romo – 30/45, 349 yards, TD, 2 INT

Top rushers

- MIN – Ciatrick Fason – 11 rushes, 36 yards
- DAL – Tyson Thompson – 10 rushes, 56 yards

Top receivers

- MIN – Troy Williamson – 1 reception, 40 yards
- DAL – Sam Hurd – 6 receptions, 110 yards

== Regular season ==
=== Schedule ===
Week	Date	Opponent	Result	Record	Venue	Attendance	NFL.com recap
1	September 11	at Washington Redskins	W 19–16	1–0	FedExField	90,608	Recap
2	September 17	Carolina Panthers	W 16–13 (OT)	2–0	Hubert H. Humphrey Metrodome	63,623	Recap
3	September 24	Chicago Bears	L 16–19	2–1	Hubert H. Humphrey Metrodome	63,754	Recap
4	October 1	at Buffalo Bills	L 12–17	2–2	Ralph Wilson Stadium	71,972	Recap
5	October 8	Detroit Lions	W 26–17	3–2	Hubert H. Humphrey Metrodome	63,906	Recap
6	Bye						
7	October 22	at Seattle Seahawks	W 31–13	4–2	Qwest Field	68,118	Recap
8	October 30	New England Patriots	L 7–31	4–3	Hubert H. Humphrey Metrodome	63,819	Recap
9	November 5	at San Francisco 49ers	L 3–9	4–4	Monster Park	68,088	Recap
10	November 12	Green Bay Packers	L 17–23	4–5	Hubert H. Humphrey Metrodome	63,924	Recap
11	November 19	at Miami Dolphins	L 20–24	4–6	Dolphin Stadium	73,070	Recap
12	November 26	Arizona Cardinals	W 31–26	5–6	Hubert H. Humphrey Metrodome	63,483	Recap
13	December 3	at Chicago Bears	L 13–23	5–7	Soldier Field	62,221	Recap
14	December 10	at Detroit Lions	W 30–20	6–7	Ford Field	60,861	Recap
15	December 17	New York Jets	L 13–26	6–8	Hubert H. Humphrey Metrodome	63,677	Recap
16	December 21	at Green Bay Packers	L 7–9	6–9	Lambeau Field	70,864	Recap
17	December 31	St. Louis Rams	L 21–41	6–10	Hubert H. Humphrey Metrodome	63,557	Recap

=== Game summaries ===
==== Week 1: at Washington Redskins ====
Week 1: Minnesota Vikings at Washington Redskins – Game summary

Quarter	1	2	3	4	Total
Vikings	6	3	7	3	19
Redskins	3	10	3	0	16

at FedExField, Landover, Maryland

- Date: September 11
- Game time: 7:00 p.m. EDT/6:00 p.m. CDT
- Game weather: Cloudy, 65 °F (18 °C)
- Game attendance: 90,608
- Referee: Mike Carey
- TV announcers (ESPN): Mike Tirico (play-by-play), Tony Kornheiser and Joe Theismann (color commentators)
- Recap, Game Book

Game information

First quarter

- MIN – Chester Taylor 4-yard run (run failed), 10:05. Vikings 6–0. Drive: 10 plays, 80 yards, 4:55.
- WAS – John Hall 27-yard field goal, 1:55. Vikings 6–3. Drive: 13 plays, 66 yards, 8:10.

Second quarter

- WAS – Clinton Portis 5-yard run (John Hall kick), 8:06. Redskins 10–6. Drive: 7 plays, 51 yards, 4:04.
- WAS – John Hall 27-yard field goal, 1:05. Redskins 13–6. Drive: 5 plays, 34 yards, 1:16.
- MIN – Ryan Longwell 46-yard field goal, 0:00. Redskins 13–9. Drive: 6 plays, 28 yards, 1:05.

Third quarter

- MIN – Marcus Robinson 20-yard pass from Brad Johnson (Ryan Longwell kick), 9:38. Vikings 16–13. Drive: 8 plays, 56 yards, 4:10.
- WAS – John Hall 22-yard field goal, 4:25. Tied 16–16. Drive: 9 plays, 61 yards, 5:13.

Fourth quarter

- MIN – Ryan Longwell 31-yard field goal, 1:00. Vikings 19–16. Drive: 11 plays, 54 yards, 4:34.

Top passers

- MIN – Brad Johnson – 16/30, 223 yards, TD
- WAS – Mark Brunell – 17/28, 163 yards

Top rushers

- MIN – Chester Taylor – 31 rushes, 88 yards, TD
- WAS – Clinton Portis – 10 rushes, 39 yards, TD

Top receivers

- MIN – Troy Williamson – 4 receptions, 77 yards
- WAS – Santana Moss – 3 receptions, 69 yards

The Vikings started the regular season on the road against the Washington Redskins on September 11, the first game of a Monday Night Football doubleheader on opening weekend. The Vikings drew first blood as running back Chester Taylor ran in a 4-yard touchdown on their opening drive; however, during the extra-point try, holder Chris Kluwe fumbled the snap and instead tried to go for a two-point conversion, which failed. The Vikings lead was cut in half later in the quarter, as Redskins kicker John Hall made a 27-yard field goal. In the second quarter, things were starting to look grim for the Vikings, as Redskins running back Clinton Portis and kicker Hall gave the Redskins a 5-yard touchdown run and another 27-yard field goal to make the score 13–6. The Vikings responded with a last-second 46-yard field goal from kicker Ryan Longwell to close the first half. In the third quarter, the Vikings continued their comeback as quarterback Brad Johnson threw a 20-yard touchdown pass to wide receiver Marcus Robinson to give Minnesota a 16–13 lead. However, the Redskins tied the game up on a 22-yard field goal by Hall. Late in the fourth quarter, Longwell gave the Vikings a 19–16 lead, as he kicked a 31-yard field goal. During the final minute of the game, the Vikings held their ground and hung on to give Brad Childress his first head coaching win, as Hall missed a 48-yard field goal for the home side.

==== Week 2: vs. Carolina Panthers ====
Week 2: Carolina Panthers at Minnesota Vikings – Game summary

Quarter	1	2	3	4	OT	Total
Panthers	0	10	3	0	0	13
Vikings	3	3	0	7	3	16

at Hubert H. Humphrey Metrodome, Minneapolis, Minnesota

- Date: September 17
- Game time: 1:00 p.m. EDT/12:00 p.m. CDT
- Game weather: Indoors
- Game attendance: 63,623
- Referee: Bill Leavy
- TV announcers (Fox): Steve Byrnes (play-by-play) and Bill Maas (color commentator)
- Recap, Game Book

Game information

First quarter

- MIN – Ryan Longwell 26-yard field goal, 8:28. Vikings 3–0. Drive: 11 plays, 63 yards, 6:32.

Second quarter

- CAR – John Kasay 25-yard field goal, 12:12. Tied 3–3. Drive: 7 plays, 62 yards, 3:04.
- MIN – Ryan Longwell 22-yard field goal, 5:25. Vikings 6–3. Drive: 8 plays, 49 yards, 3:53.
- CAR – DeAngelo Williams 3-yard run (John Kasay kick), 0:17. Panthers 10–6. Drive: 12 plays, 85 yards, 5:08.

Third quarter

- CAR – John Kasay 26-yard field goal, 2:51. Panthers 13–6. Drive: 8 plays, 52 yards, 4:09.

Fourth quarter

- MIN – Richard Owens 16-yard pass from Ryan Longwell (Ryan Longwell kick), 7:48. Tied 13–13. Drive: 4 plays, 21 yards, 2:02.

Overtime

- MIN – Ryan Longwell 19-yard field goal, 7:25. Vikings 16–13. Drive: 10 plays, 78 yards, 5:40.

Top passers

- CAR – Jake Delhomme – 17/33, 181 yards
- MIN – Brad Johnson – 19/31, 243 yards, INT

Top rushers

- CAR – DeAngelo Williams – 13 rushes, 74 yards, TD
- MIN – Chester Taylor – 24 rushes, 113 yards

Top receivers

- CAR – Keyshawn Johnson – 5 receptions, 106 yards
- MIN – Troy Williamson – 6 receptions, 102 yards

In their Week 2 home-opener, the Vikings faced the Carolina Panthers in a low-scoring fight. The Vikings drew first blood with a 26-yard field goal by kicker Ryan Longwell. In the second quarter, Carolina got a field goal with opposing kicker John Kasay. The Vikings responded with another Longwell field goal from 22 yards, but they fell before halftime with opposing running back DeAngelo Williams getting a 3-yard run for the Panthers. The Vikings trailed a bit further in the third quarter, as Karney kicked a 26-yard field goal. The Vikings started their own comeback. In the fourth quarter, Longwell faked a field goal try and threw a 16-yard touchdown pass to fullback Richard Owens to tie the game up going into overtime. In the extra period, Longwell booted the game-winning 19-yard field goal to give Minnesota the win. It was the first time in Vikings history that a coach started 2–0 in his first year.

==== Week 3: vs. Chicago Bears ====
Week 3: Chicago Bears at Minnesota Vikings – Game summary

Quarter	1	2	3	4	Total
Bears	3	0	6	10	19
Vikings	3	3	0	10	16

at Hubert H. Humphrey Metrodome, Minneapolis, Minnesota

- Date: September 24
- Game time: 1:00 p.m. EDT/12:00 p.m. CDT
- Game weather: Indoors
- Game attendance: 63,754
- Referee: Scott Green
- TV announcers (Fox): Dick Stockton (play-by-play), Daryl Johnston (color commentator) and Tony Siragusa (sideline reporter)
- Recap, Game Book

Game information

First quarter

- MIN – Ryan Longwell 31-yard field goal, 10:49. Vikings 3–0. Drive: 8 plays, 68 yards, 4:11.
- CHI – Robbie Gould 41-yard field goal, 6:20. Tied 3–3. Drive: 9 plays, 33 yards, 4:29.

Second quarter

- MIN – Ryan Longwell 26-yard field goal, 1:08. Vikings 6–3. Drive: 7 plays, 24 yards, 3:24.

Third quarter

- CHI – Robbie Gould 24-yard field goal, 10:53. Tied 6–6. Drive: 9 plays, 66 yards, 4:07.
- CHI – Robbie Gould 31-yard field goal, 3:18. Bears 9–6. Drive: 9 plays, 48 yards, 5:14.

Fourth quarter

- MIN – Antoine Winfield 7-yard interception return (Ryan Longwell kick), 14:53. Vikings 13–9.
- CHI – Robbie Gould 49-yard field goal, 10:37. Vikings 13–12. Drive: 10 plays, 43 yards, 4:16.
- MIN – Ryan Longwell 41-yard field goal, 7:27. Vikings 16–12. Drive: 8 plays, 51 yards, 3:10.
- CHI – Rashied Davis 24-yard pass from Rex Grossman (Robbie Gould kick), 1:53. Bears 19–16. Drive: 5 plays, 37 yards, 1:32.

Top passers

- CHI – Rex Grossman – 23/41, 278 yards, TD, 2 INT
- MIN – Brad Johnson – 21/31, 194 yards

Top rushers

- CHI – Thomas Jones – 18 rushes, 54 yards
- MIN – Chester Taylor – 20 rushes, 74 yards

Top receivers

- CHI – Muhsin Muhammad – 9 receptions, 118 yards
- MIN – Travis Taylor – 6 receptions, 82 yards

Staying at home, the Vikings played a fierce NFC North fight with the Chicago Bears. In the first quarter, Minnesota got on the board first with kicker Ryan Longwell completing a 31-yard field goal, but the Bears tied it up via a 41-yard field goal from kicker Robbie Gould. In the second quarter, Longwell put the Vikings back in front with a 26-yard field goal, the only score of the period. In the third quarter, Minnesota began to trail, as Gould kicked a 24-yard and a 31-yard field goal to give Chicago a small lead. In the fourth quarter, the Vikings retook the lead as cornerback Antoine Winfield returned an interception 7 yards for a touchdown. Gould kicked a 49-yard field goal, but Longwell answered with a 41-yard field goal for the Vikings. The Vikings fell to their doom, as Chester Taylor fumbled and the Bears quarterback Rex Grossman completed a 24-yard touchdown pass to wide receiver Rashied Davis, which gave the Vikings their first loss of the year. Of the first five games played by the Bears in the 2006 season, this was the closest game. All others have been decided by at least 26 points.

==== Week 4: at Buffalo Bills ====
Week 4: Minnesota Vikings at Buffalo Bills – Game summary

Quarter	1	2	3	4	Total
Vikings	3	3	0	6	12
Bills	0	7	7	3	17

at Ralph Wilson Stadium, Buffalo, New York

- Date: October 1
- Game time: 1:00 p.m. EDT/12:00 p.m. CDT
- Game weather: Sunny, 58 °F (14 °C)
- Game attendance: 71,972
- Referee: Ron Winter
- TV announcers (Fox): Ron Pitts (play-by-play) and Terry Donahue (color commentator)
- Recap, Game Book

Game information

First quarter

- MIN – Ryan Longwell 37-yard field goal, 8:40. Vikings 3–0. Drive: 12 plays, 61 yards, 6:20.

Second quarter

- BUF – Willis McGahee 1-yard run (Rian Lindell kick), 13:08. Bills 7–3. Drive: 12 plays, 79 yards, 7:21.
- MIN – Ryan Longwell 49-yard field goal, 0:00. Bills 7–6. Drive: 6 plays, 35 yards, 0:42.

Third quarter

- BUF – Peerless Price 8-yard pass from J. P. Losman (Rian Lindell kick), 9:12. Bills 14–6. Drive: 11 plays, 70 yards, 5:48.

Fourth quarter

- BUF – Rian Lindell 28-yard field goal, 14:05. Bills 17–6. Drive: 10 plays, 22 yards, 5:44.
- MIN – Marcus Robinson 29-yard pass from Brad Johnson (pass failed), 3:07. Bills 17–12. Drive: 7 plays, 55 yards, 1:03.

Top passers

- MIN – Brad Johnson – 25/44, 267 yards, TD, 2 INT
- BUF – J. P. Losman – 23/32, 224 yards, TD

Top rushers

- MIN – Chester Taylor – 10 rushes, 23 yards
- BUF – Willis McGahee – 28 rushes, 78 yards, TD

Top receivers

- MIN – Marcus Robinson – 5 receptions, 78 yards, TD
- BUF – Lee Evans – 7 receptions, 92 yards

Hoping to rebound from the previous week's loss, the Vikings traveled to Ralph Wilson Stadium for a match-up with the Buffalo Bills. In the first quarter, the Vikings drew first blood as kicker Ryan Longwell nailed a 37-yard field goal for the only score of the period. In the second quarter, Minnesota got into a tiny hole, as Bills running back Willis McGahee got a 1-yard touchdown run. Longwell gave the Vikings a 49-yard field goal as time ran out of the first half, but in the third quarter, the Vikes found themselves in a bit of a hole, as Buffalo quarterback J. P. Losman connected with wide receiver Peerless Price on an 8-yard touchdown pass for the only score of the period. In the fourth quarter, Minnesota trailed even further, as Bills kicker Rian Lindell got a 28-yard field goal. The Vikings tried to come back, as quarterback Brad Johnson completed a 29-yard touchdown pass to wide receiver Marcus Robinson. The two-point conversion failed and during their next drive, they ran out of time. With their loss, the Vikings fell to 2–2.

==== Week 5: vs. Detroit Lions ====
Week 5: Detroit Lions at Minnesota Vikings – Game summary

Quarter	1	2	3	4	Total
Lions	0	10	7	0	17
Vikings	3	0	0	23	26

at Hubert H. Humphrey Metrodome, Minneapolis, Minnesota

- Date: October 8
- Game time: 1:00 p.m. EDT/12:00 p.m. CDT
- Game weather: Indoors
- Game attendance: 63,906
- Referee: Gerald Austin
- TV announcers (Fox): Sam Rosen (play-by-play), Tim Ryan (color commentator) and Chris Myers (sideline reporter)
- Recap, Game Book

Game information

First quarter

- MIN – Ryan Longwell 26-yard field goal, 4:23. Vikings 3–0. Drive: 10 plays, 72 yards, 6:48.

Second quarter

- DET – Jon Kitna 8-yard run (Jason Hanson kick), 2:17. Lions 7–3. Drive: 5 plays, 28 yards, 1:58.
- DET – Jason Hanson 53-yard field goal, 0:33. Lions 10–3. Drive: 6 plays, 21 yards, 0:41.

Third quarter

- DET – Dan Campbell 12-yard pass from Jon Kitna (Jason Hanson kick), 5:11. Lions 17–3. Drive: 4 plays, 56 yards, 1:24.

Fourth quarter

- MIN – Travis Taylor 3-yard pass from Brad Johnson (Ryan Longwell kick), 14:14. Lions 17–10. Drive: 10 plays, 68 yards, 5:57.
- MIN – Ben Leber fumble recovery in the end zone (kick blocked), 13:12. Lions 17–16.
- MIN – Ryan Longwell 20-yard field goal, 3:00. Vikings 19–17. Drive: 9 plays, 61 yards, 5:07.
- MIN – E. J. Henderson 45-yard interception return (Ryan Longwell kick), 1:31. Vikings 26–17.

Top passers

- DET – Jon Kitna – 23/42, 225 yards, TD, 3 INT
- MIN – Brad Johnson – 26/34, 201 yards, TD, INT

Top rushers

- DET – Jon Kitna – 1 rush, 8 yards, TD
- MIN – Chester Taylor – 26 rushes, 123 yards

Top receivers

- DET – Az-Zahir Hakim – 8 receptions, 92 yards
- MIN – Travis Taylor – 4 receptions, 44 yards, TD

After dropping two straight games, the Vikings came home for an NFC North fight with the Detroit Lions. The Vikings struck first with a 26-yard field goal, which were the only points scored in the first quarter. The Vikings did not score again until the fourth quarter. Detroit got close, but Napoleon Harris got the first interception of his five-year career at the end of the first. In the second quarter, Detroit quarterback Jon Kitna ran 8 yards to score a touchdown, putting the Lions ahead 7–3. Detroit's next drive resulted in a field goal to put them ahead 10–3. In the third quarter, Detroit recovered a Vikings fumble and then go on to score another touchdown to bring their lead to 17–3. In the first minute of the fourth quarter, the Vikings' Travis Taylor scored a touchdown on a three-yard reception to bring the score to 17–10. The Lions' next drive ended in a forced fumble when Pat Williams burst through the line untouched and Kitna lost the ball, which was picked up by the Vikings' Ben Leber in the end zone for a touchdown; however, the extra point was blocked, leaving the score at 17–16. With a 4th-and-1 for the Vikings on the Lions' 34, kicker Ryan Longwell pooch-punted the ball to the Lions' 7. Later, the Vikings scored a 20-yard field goal to take the lead at 19–17. Detroit then threw an interception on 4th-and-10 to E.J. Henderson, who ran 45 yards to score a touchdown, bringing the score to 26–17. The Vikings' Darren Sharper got an interception in the last minute to seal the victory, bringing the Vikings' record up to 3–2.

==== Week 7: at Seattle Seahawks ====
Week 7: Minnesota Vikings at Seattle Seahawks – Game summary

Quarter	1	2	3	4	Total
Vikings	3	7	14	7	31
Seahawks	7	3	0	3	13

at Qwest Field, Seattle, Washington

- Date: October 22
- Game time: 4:15 p.m. EDT/3:15 p.m. CDT
- Game weather: Sunny, 60 °F (16 °C)
- Game attendance: 68,118
- Referee: Walt Anderson
- TV announcers (Fox): Ron Pitts (play-by-play) and Terry Donahue (color commentator)
- Recap, Game Book

Game information

First quarter

- MIN – Ryan Longwell 33-yard field goal, 11:40. Vikings 3–0. Drive: 6 plays, 38 yards, 3:20.
- SEA – Darrell Jackson 72-yard pass from Matt Hasselbeck (Josh Brown kick), 10:01. Seahawks 7–3. Drive: 3 plays, 75 yards, 1:39.

Second quarter

- SEA – Josh Brown 42-yard field goal, 14:13. Seahawks 10–3. Drive: 7 plays, 45 yards, 2:18.
- MIN – Marcus Robinson 40-yard pass from Brad Johnson (Ryan Longwell kick), 7:55. Tied 10–10. Drive: 10 plays, 84 yards, 6:18.

Third quarter

- MIN – Jermaine Wiggins 15-yard pass from Mewelde Moore (Ryan Longwell kick), 8:51. Vikings 17–10. Drive: 9 plays, 69 yards, 5:10.
- MIN – Chester Taylor 95-yard run (Ryan Longwell kick), 4:50. Vikings 24–10. Drive: 1 play, 95 yards, 0:16.

Fourth quarter

- SEA – Josh Brown 26-yard field goal, 14:11. Vikings 24–13. Drive: 12 plays, 72 yards, 5:39.
- MIN – Kevin Williams fumble recovery in the end zone (Ryan Longwell kick), 7:48. Vikings 31–13.

Top passers

- MIN – Brad Johnson – 15/24, 171 yards, TD
- SEA – Seneca Wallace – 14/25, 134 yards, 2 INT

Top rushers

- MIN – Chester Taylor – 26 rushes, 169 yards, TD
- SEA – Maurice Morris – 17 rushes, 49 yards

Top receivers

- MIN – Marcus Robinson – 4 receptions, 77 yards, TD
- SEA – Darrell Jackson – 7 rushes, 136 yards, TD

Coming off their bye week, the Vikings flew to Qwest Field and took on the Seattle Seahawks. In the first quarter, the Vikes drew first blood with kicker Ryan Longwell nailing a 33-yard field goal. Afterwards, the Seahawks responded with quarterback Matt Hasselbeck completing a 72-yard touchdown pass to wide receiver Darrell Jackson. In the second quarter, Seattle improved its lead with kicker Josh Brown kicking a 42-yard field goal. Minnesota responded with quarterback Brad Johnson completing a 40-yard touchdown pass to wide receiver Marcus Robinson. In the third quarter, the Vikings managed to retake the lead with running back Mewelde Moore throwing a 15-yard option pass to tight end Jermaine Wiggins, while running back Chester Taylor ran 95 yards for a touchdown (the longest rushing touchdown play in franchise history). In the fourth quarter, the Seahawks had Brown kick a 26-yard field goal. The Vikes pulled away and won with defensive tackle Kevin Williams recovering a Seattle fumble in their endzone. With the win, Minnesota improved to 4–2.

==== Week 8: vs. New England Patriots ====
Week 8: New England Patriots at Minnesota Vikings – Game summary

Quarter	1	2	3	4	Total
Patriots	7	10	14	0	31
Vikings	0	0	7	0	7

at Hubert H. Humphrey Metrodome, Minneapolis, Minnesota

- Date: October 30
- Game time: 8:30 p.m. EST/7:30 p.m. CST
- Game weather: Indoors
- Game attendance: 63,819
- Referee: Larry Nemmers
- TV announcers (ESPN): Mike Tirico (play-by-play), Tony Kornheiser and Joe Theismann (color commentators)
- Recap, Game Book

Game information

First quarter

- NE – Reche Caldwell 6-yard pass from Tom Brady (Stephen Gostkowski kick), 11:07. Patriots 7–0. Drive: 7 plays, 86 yards, 3:53.

Second quarter

- NE – Stephen Gostkowski 23-yard field goal, 12:09. Patriots 10–0. Drive: 8 plays, 93 yards, 3:27.
- NE – Benjamin Watson 9-yard pass from Tom Brady (Stephen Gostkowski kick), 0:25. Patriots 17–0. Drive: 11 plays, 74 yards, 3:57.

Third quarter

- MIN – Mewelde Moore 71-yard punt return (Ryan Longwell kick), 10:36. Patriots 17–7.
- NE – Troy Brown 7-yard pass from Tom Brady (Stephen Gostkowski kick), 9:03. Patriots 24–7. Drive: 3 plays, 21 yards, 1:33.
- NE – Chad Jackson 10-yard pass from Tom Brady (Stephen Gostkowski kick), 0:05. Patriots 31–7. Drive: 4 plays, 39 yards, 1:48.

Fourth quarter

- No scoring plays.

Top passers

- NE – Tom Brady – 29/43, 372 yards, 4 TD, INT
- MIN – Brad Johnson – 20/33, 185 yards, 3 INT

Top rushers

- NE – Heath Evans – 1 rush, 35 yards
- MIN – Chester Taylor – 10 rushes, 22 yards

Top receivers

- NE – Benjamin Watson – 7 receptions, 95 yards, TD
- MIN – Mewelde Moore – 4 receptions, 91 yards

The Vikes fell to 4–3 with a loss at home on Monday Night Football to the New England Patriots.

The Pats, who came out passing instead of bothering to even try challenging the Vikings rush defense, got out to an early lead on the opening drive as quarterback Tom Brady hit wide receiver Reche Caldwell for a 6-yard touchdown pass. Kicker Stephen Gostkowski connected on a 23-yard field goal early in the second quarter. Brady threw his second of what turned out to be four touchdown passes, this time to tight end Benjamin Watson just before halftime to give the Pats a 17–0 lead. The Vikes finally got on the board as running back Mewelde Moore returned a punt 71 yards for a touchdown early in the third quarter. That was all the Vikings could muster as Brady threw his final two touchdowns to wide receivers Troy Brown and Chad Jackson respectively to close out the scoring.

==== Week 9: at San Francisco 49ers ====
Week 9: Minnesota Vikings at San Francisco 49ers – Game summary

Quarter	1	2	3	4	Total
Vikings	3	0	0	0	3
49ers	0	6	0	3	9

at Monster Park, San Francisco, California

- Date: November 5
- Game time: 3:05 p.m. CST/1:05 p.m. PST
- Game weather: Sunny, 62 °F (17 °C)
- Game attendance: 68,088
- Referee: Ed Hochuli
- TV announcers (Fox): Sam Rosen (play-by-play), Tim Ryan (color commentator) and Chris Myers (sideline reporter)
- Recap, Game Book

Game information

First quarter

- MIN – Ryan Longwell 21-yard field goal, 3:51. Vikings 3–0. Drive: 16 plays, 69 yards, 9:00.

Second quarter

- SF – Joe Nedney 25-yard field goal, 13:22. Tied 3–3. Drive: 13 plays, 54 yards, 5:29.
- SF – Joe Nedney 30-yard field goal, 8:18. 49ers 6–3. Drive: 4 plays, 9 yards, 2:29.

Third quarter

- No scoring plays.

Fourth quarter

- SF – Joe Nedney 51-yard field goal, 7:15. 49ers 9–3. Drive: 9 plays, 36 yards, 4:54.

Top passers

- MIN – Brad Johnson – 21/31, 136 yards, INT
- SF – Alex Smith – 13/21, 105 yards, INT

Top rushers

- MIN – Chester Taylor – 26 rushes, 96 yards
- SF – Frank Gore – 19 rushes, 41 yards

Top receivers

- MIN – Chester Taylor – 8 receptions, 45 yards
- SF – Frank Gore – 5 receptions, 36 yards

Hoping to rebound from their disappointing home loss to the Patriots, the Vikings flew to Monster Park for a Week 9 clash with the San Francisco 49ers. In the first quarter, the Vikings scored first, as kicker Ryan Longwell completed a 21-yard field goal for the only score of the period. In the second quarter, the 49ers get two Joe Nedney field goals (a 25-yarder and a 30-yarder) and take the lead. After a scoreless third quarter, Nedney put the game away for San Francisco as he nailed a 51-yard field goal. With another loss, the Vikes fell to 4–4.

==== Week 10: vs. Green Bay Packers ====
Week 10: Green Bay Packers at Minnesota Vikings – Game summary

Quarter	1	2	3	4	Total
Packers	10	7	3	3	23
Vikings	0	14	0	3	17

at Hubert H. Humphrey Metrodome, Minneapolis, Minnesota

- Date: November 12
- Game time: 1:00 p.m. EST/12:00 p.m. CST
- Game weather: Indoors
- Game attendance: 63,924
- Referee: Terry McAulay
- TV announcers (Fox): Kenny Albert (play-by-play), Brian Baldinger (color commentator) and Jay Glazer (sideline reporter)
- Recap, Game Book

Game information

First quarter

- GB – Dave Rayner 20-yard field goal, 6:40. Packers 3–0. Drive: 13 plays, 83 yards, 6:54.
- GB – Noah Herron 5-yard pass from Brett Favre (Dave Rayner kick), 3:34. Packers 10–0. Drive: 7 plays, 22 yards, 2:55.

Second quarter

- MIN – Billy McMullen 40-yard pass from Brad Johnson (Ryan Longwell kick), 14:52. Packers 10–7. Drive: 8 plays, 72 yards, 3:42.
- MIN – Billy McMullen fumble recovery in the end zone (Ryan Longwell kick), 7:52. Vikings 14–10. Drive: 9 plays, 82 yards, 5:20.
- GB – Donald Driver 82-yard pass from Brett Favre (Dave Rayner kick), 0:48. Packers 17–14. Drive: 3 plays, 97 yards, 1:02.

Third quarter

- GB – Dave Rayner 24-yard field goal, 4:38. Packers 20–14. Drive: 7 plays, 51 yards, 2:33.

Fourth quarter

- GB – Dave Rayner 29-yard field goal, 2:11. Packers 23–14. Drive: 10 plays, 66 yards, 5:35.
- MIN – Ryan Longwell 34-yard field goal, 0:58. Packers 23–17. Drive: 9 plays, 57 yards, 1:13.

Top passers

- GB – Brett Favre – 24/42, 347 yards, 2 TD
- MIN – Brad Johnson – 18/30, 257 yards, TD, INT

Top rushers

- GB – Ahman Green – 22 rushes, 55 yards
- MIN – Chester Taylor – 20 rushes, 75 yards

Top receivers

- GB – Donald Driver – 6 receptions, 191 yards, TD
- MIN – Bethel Johnson – 2 receptions, 75 yards

Trying to end their two-game skid, the Vikings flew home for an NFC North fight with the Green Bay Packers. In the first quarter, the Vikings trailed early as Packers kicker Dave Rayner nailed a 20-yard field goal, while quarterback Brett Favre completed a 5-yard touchdown pass to running back Noah Herron. In the second quarter, the Vikes took the lead as quarterback Brad Johnson completed a 40-yard touchdown pass to wide receiver Billy McMullen. Afterwards, McMullen recovered a fumble within the Packers end zone for another touchdown. However, Green Bay retook the lead with Favre completing an 82-yard touchdown pass to wide receiver Donald Driver. In the third quarter, Rayner helped the Packers with a 24-yard field goal for the only score of the period. In the fourth quarter, Rayner kicked one more field goal for Green Bay, as he kicked a 29-yard field goal. Minnesota tried to fight back, but all they could get was kicker Ryan Longwell nailing a 34-yard field goal. With their third-straight loss, the Vikings fell to 4–5.

==== Week 11: at Miami Dolphins ====
Week 11: Minnesota Vikings at Miami Dolphins – Game summary

Quarter	1	2	3	4	Total
Vikings	7	0	3	10	20
Dolphins	0	10	0	14	24

at Dolphin Stadium, Miami Gardens, Florida

- Date: November 19
- Game time: 1:00 p.m. EST/12:00 p.m. CST
- Game weather: Sunny, 68 °F (20 °C)
- Game attendance: 73,070
- Referee: Jeff Triplette
- TV announcers (Fox): Sam Rosen (play-by-play) and Tim Ryan (color commentator)
- Recap, Game Book

Game information

First quarter

- MIN – Chester Taylor 1-yard run (Ryan Longwell kick), 4:02. Vikings 7–0. Drive: 12 plays, 96 yards, 6:19.

Second quarter

- MIA – Olindo Mare 44-yard field goal, 14:09. Vikings 7–3. Drive: 5 plays, 18 yards, 1:10.
- MIA – Justin Peelle 11-yard pass from Joey Harrington (Olindo Mare kick), 5:34. Dolphins 10–7. Drive: 9 plays, 78 yards, 3:32.

Third quarter

- MIN – Ryan Longwell 35-yard field goal, 6:09. Tied 10–10. Drive: 9 plays, 26 yards, 3:59.

Fourth quarter

- MIN – Ryan Longwell 19-yard field goal, 14:12. Vikings 13–10. Drive: 4 plays, 2 yards, 0:56.
- MIA – Renaldo Hill 48-yard fumble return (Olindo Mare kick), 9:27. Dolphins 17–13.
- MIA – Jason Taylor 51-yard interception return (Olindo Mare kick), 3:25. Dolphins 24–13.
- MIN – Chester Taylor 1-yard run (Ryan Longwell kick), 0:00. Dolphins 24–20.

Top passers

- MIN – Brad Johnson – 26/44, 262 yards, INT
- MIA – Joey Harrington – 26/42, 254 yards, TD, INT

Top rushers

- MIN – Chester Taylor – 28 rushes, 80 yards, 2 TD
- MIA – Ronnie Brown – 11 rushes, 5 yards

Top receivers

- MIN – Travis Taylor – 8 receptions, 67 yards
- MIA – Marty Booker – 6 receptions, 84 yards

Trying to stop a three-game skid, the Vikings flew to Dolphin Stadium for an interconference fight with the Miami Dolphins. In the first quarter, the Vikes struck first with running back Chester Taylor getting a 1-yard touchdown run for the only score of the period. However, in the second quarter, the Dolphins took the lead with kicker Olindo Mare getting a 44-yard field goal, while quarterback Joey Harrington completed an 11-yard touchdown pass to tight end Justin Peelle. In the third quarter, Minnesota tied the game with kicker Ryan Longwell nailing a 35-yard field goal. Afterwards, in the fourth quarter, Longwell kicked a 19-yard field goal to help the Vikings retake the lead. However, Miami's defense made some huge stops on the Vikes, with free safety Renaldo Hill returning a fumble 48 yards for a touchdown, while defensive end Jason Taylor returned an interception 51 yards for a touchdown. The only response that Minnesota could muster was on the final offensive play of the game, as Taylor got another 1-yard touchdown run. With their fourth-straight loss, the Vikings fell 4–6.

==== Week 12: vs. Arizona Cardinals ====
Week 12: Arizona Cardinals at Minnesota Vikings – Game summary

Quarter	1	2	3	4	Total
Cardinals	7	6	0	13	26
Vikings	7	7	10	7	31

at Hubert H. Humphrey Metrodome, Minneapolis, Minnesota

- Date: November 26
- Game time: 1:00 p.m. EST/12:00 p.m. CST
- Game weather: Indoors
- Game attendance: 63,483
- Referee: Jerome Boger
- TV announcers (Fox): Matt Vasgersian (play-by-play) and J.C. Pearson (color commentator)
- Recap, Game Book

Game information

First quarter

- ARI – J. J. Arrington 99-yard kickoff return (Neil Rackers kick), 14:44. Cardinals 7–0. Drive: 0 plays, 0 yards, 0:16.
- MIN – Chester Taylor 1-yard run (Ryan Longwell kick), 9:42. Tied 7–7. Drive: 9 plays, 70 yards, 5:02.

Second quarter

- ARI – Neil Rackers 21-yard field goal, 13:28. Cardinals 10–7. Drive: 9 plays, 77 yards, 3:04.
- ARI – Neil Rackers 50-yard field goal, 3:48. Cardinals 13–7. Drive: 11 plays, 57 yards, 4:40.
- MIN – Marcus Robinson 17-yard pass from Brad Johnson (Ryan Longwell kick), 0:31. Vikings 14–13. Drive: 11 plays, 80 yards, 3:17.

Third quarter

- MIN – Billy McMullen 9-yard pass from Brad Johnson (Ryan Longwell kick), 10:37. Vikings 21–13. Drive: 10 plays, 80 yards, 4:23.
- MIN – Ryan Longwell 40-yard field goal, 6:38. Vikings 24–13. Drive: 9 plays, 32 yards, 3:38.

Fourth quarter

- MIN – Jeff Dugan 3-yard pass from Brad Johnson (Ryan Longwell kick), 12:00. Vikings 31–13. Drive: 7 plays, 35 yards, 3:02.
- ARI – Adrian Wilson 99-yard fumble return (pass failed), 10:08. Vikings 31–19.
- ARI – Anquan Boldin 9-yard pass from Matt Leinart (Neil Rackers kick), 0:39. Vikings 31–26. Drive: 9 plays, 53 yards, 1:10.

Top passers

- ARI – Matt Leinart – 31/51, 405 yards, TD, 2 INT
- MIN – Brad Johnson – 27/41, 271 yards, 3 TD

Top rushers

- ARI – Edgerrin James – 4 rushes, 15 yards
- MIN – Chester Taylor – 27 rushes, 136 yards, TD

Top receivers

- ARI – Larry Fitzgerald – 11 receptions, 172 yards
- MIN – Marcus Robinson – 7 receptions, 82 yards, TD

Hoping to end their four-game skid, the Vikings returned home for a Week 12 fight against the Arizona Cardinals. This game was notable for the return of Head Coach Dennis Green, who formerly coached the Vikings and now works for the Cardinals. Right out of the gate, the Vikes trailed early as Cardinals running back J. J. Arrington returned the opening kickoff 99 yards for a touchdown. The Vikings responded with running back Chester Taylor getting a 1-yard touchdown run. In the second quarter, Cards kicker Neil Rackers helped increase Arizona's lead with a 21-yard and a 50-yard field goal. Afterwards, Minnesota struck back with quarterback Brad Johnson completing a 17-yard touchdown pass to wide receiver Marcus Robinson. In the third quarter, the Vikings took the lead with Johnson completing a 9-yard touchdown pass to rookie wide receiver Billy McMullen, while kicker Ryan Longwell nailed a 40-yard field goal. In the fourth quarter, the Vikes managed to put the icing on the game with Johnson completing a 3-yard touchdown pass to fullback Jeff Dugan. The Cardinals tried to fight back, with Strong Safety Adrian Wilson returning a fumble 99 yards for a touchdown (with a failed two-point conversion) and quarterback Matt Leinart completing a 9-yard touchdown pass to wide receiver Anquan Boldin. Minnesota held on to snap its four-game losing streak. With the win, the Vikings improved to 5–6.

==== Week 13: at Chicago Bears ====
Week 13: Minnesota Vikings at Chicago Bears – Game summary

Quarter	1	2	3	4	Total
Vikings	0	3	3	7	13
Bears	0	7	14	2	23

at Soldier Field, Chicago, Illinois

- Date: December 3
- Game time: 1:00 p.m. EST/12:00 p.m. CST
- Game weather: Mostly cloudy, 20 °F (−7 °C)
- Game attendance: 62,221
- Referee: Tony Corrente
- TV announcers (Fox): Dick Stockton (play-by-play), Daryl Johnston (color commentator) and Tony Siragusa (sideline reporter)
- Recap, Game Book

Game information

First quarter

- No scoring plays.

Second quarter

- CHI – Devin Hester 45-yard punt return (Robbie Gould kick), 12:20. Bears 7–0.
- MIN – Ryan Longwell 23-yard field goal, 8:54. Bears 7–3.

Third quarter

- MIN – Ryan Longwell 30-yard field goal, 10:07. Bears 7–6.
- CHI – Ricky Manning 54-yard interception return (Robbie Gould kick), 4:33. Bears 14–6.
- CHI – Cedric Benson 24-yard run (Robbie Gould kick), 3:04. Bears 21–6. Drive: 4 plays, 33 yards, 1:16.

Fourth quarter

- CHI – Ciatrick Fason tackled in the end zone by Tank Johnson for a safety, 13:59. Bears 23–6.
- MIN – Ciatrick Fason 4-yard run (Ryan Longwell kick), 5:40. Bears 23–13.

Top passers

- MIN – Brad Johnson – 11/26, 73 yards, 4 INT
- CHI – Rex Grossman – 6/19, 34 yards, 3 INT

Top rushers

- MIN – Chester Taylor – 17 rushes, 99 yards
- CHI – Cedric Benson – 9 rushes, 60 yards, TD

Top receivers

- MIN – Mewelde Moore – 5 receptions, 51 yards
- CHI – Bernard Berrian – 4 receptions, 21 yards

Trying to build on their win over the Cardinals, the Vikings flew to Soldier Field for an NFC North rematch with the Chicago Bears. After a scoreless first quarter, the Bears drew first blood in the second quarter with defensive back Devin Hester returning a punt 45 yards for a touchdown. Afterwards, Minnesota had kicker Ryan Longwell nail a 23-yard field goal. In the third quarter, Longwell kicked a 30-yard field goal, but that was as close as the Vikings got to Chicago in the game, because after Longwell's field goal, the Bears took over with defensive back Ricky Manning, Jr. returning an interception 54 yards for a touchdown, while running back Cedric Benson got a 24-yard touchdown run. By the time the fourth quarter came around, quarterback Brad Johnson was benched for the game, due to throwing four interceptions. Back-up quarterback Brooks Bollinger took over, but he fare any better, as he got sacked in his own end zone by defensive tackle Tank Johnson for a safety. Afterwards, the Vikings had their only successful drive of the game with running back Ciatrick Fason getting a 4-yard touchdown run. Afterwards, Bollinger sprained his left arm during a sack, so rookie quarterback Tarvaris Jackson came in to finish the game. With the loss, Minnesota fell to 5–7.

==== Week 14: at Detroit Lions ====
Week 14: Minnesota Vikings at Detroit Lions – Game summary

Quarter	1	2	3	4	Total
Vikings	14	6	3	7	30
Lions	0	10	3	7	20

at Ford Field, Detroit, Michigan

- Date: December 10
- Game time: 1:00 p.m. EST/12:00 p.m. CST
- Game weather: Indoors
- Game attendance: 60,861
- Referee: Bill Carollo
- TV announcers (Fox): Ron Pitts (play-by-play), Jesse Palmer (color commentator) and Jennifer Hammond (sideline reporter)
- Recap, Game Book

Game information

First quarter

- MIN – Artose Pinner 3-yard run (Ryan Longwell kick), 8:01. Vikings 7–0. Drive: 14 plays, 80 yards, 6:59.
- MIN – Artose Pinner 4-yard run (Ryan Longwell kick), 2:32. Vikings 14–0. Drive: 6 plays, 45 yards, 2:48.

Second quarter

- MIN – Brad Johnson 3-yard run (pass failed), 13:41. Vikings 20–0. Drive: 5 plays, 22 yards, 2:27.
- DET – Jamar Fletcher 88-yard interception return (Jason Hanson kick), 8:04. Vikings 20–7.
- DET – Jason Hanson 53-yard field goal, 1:30. Vikings 20–10. Drive: 7 plays, 37 yards, 2:01.

Third quarter

- MIN – Ryan Longwell 30-yard field goal, 12:33. Vikings 23–10. Drive: 4 plays, 6 yards, 1:32.
- DET – Jason Hanson 45-yard field goal, 7:27. Vikings 23–13. Drive: 9 plays, 36 yards, 5:06.

Fourth quarter

- MIN – Artose Pinner 1-yard run (Ryan Longwell kick), 13:46. Vikings 30–13. Drive: 5 plays, 26 yards, 2:15.
- DET – Kevin Jones 23-yard pass from Jon Kitna (Jason Hanson kick), 10:48. Vikings 30–20. Drive: 6 plays, 71 yards, 2:58.

Top passers

- MIN – Brad Johnson – 14/22, 159 yards, INT
- DET – Jon Kitna – 28/41, 294 yards, TD, 3 INT

Top rushers

- MIN – Artose Pinner – 29 rushes, 125 yards, 3 TD
- DET – Arlen Harris – 1 rush, 0 yards

Top receivers

- MIN – Marcus Robinson – 3 receptions, 45 yards
- DET – Mike Furrey – 9 receptions, 84 yards

After getting swept by the Bears, the Vikings flew to Ford Field for an NFC North rematch with the Detroit Lions. In the first quarter, running back Artose Pinner (a former Lion) helped Minnesota gain an early lead with a 3-yard and a 4-yard touchdown run. In the second quarter, quarterback Brad Johnson got a 3-yard touchdown run, yet it was followed up with a failed two-point conversion. Detroit retaliated with defensive back Jamar Fletcher returning an interception 88 yards for a touchdown, while kicker Jason Hanson kicked a 53-yard field goal. In the third quarter, the Vikes got a 30-yard field goal from kicker Ryan Longwell, yet Detroit's Hanson nailed a 45-yard field goal. In the fourth quarter, Pinner helped wrap the game up with a 1-yard touchdown run. Even though Lions quarterback Jon Kitna completed a 23-yard touchdown pass to running back Kevin Jones, Minnesota held on to sweep Detroit. With the win, the Vikings improved to 6–7.

==== Week 15: vs. New York Jets ====
Week 15: New York Jets at Minnesota Vikings – Game summary

Quarter	1	2	3	4	Total
Jets	7	16	3	0	26
Vikings	7	0	0	6	13

at Hubert H. Humphrey Metrodome, Minneapolis, Minnesota

- Date: December 17
- Game time: 1:00 p.m. EST/12:00 p.m. CST
- Game weather: Indoors
- Game attendance: 63,677
- Referee: Bill Vinovich
- TV announcers (CBS): Greg Gumbel (play-by-play) and Dan Dierdorf (color commentator)
- Recap, Game Book

Game information

First quarter

- MIN – Travis Taylor 30-yard pass from Brad Johnson (Ryan Longwell kick), 12:53. Vikings 7–0. Drive: 3 plays, 34 yards, 1:21.
- NYJ – Cedric Houston 6-yard run (Mike Nugent kick), 6:20. Tied 7–7. Drive: 12 plays, 67 yards, 6:33.

Second quarter

- NYJ – Mike Nugent 25-yard field goal, 11:39. Jets 10–7. Drive: 7 plays, 49 yards, 3:38.
- NYJ – Laveranues Coles 21-yard pass from Chad Pennington (Mike Nugent kick), 6:12. Jets 17–7. Drive: 7 plays, 61 yards, 3:18.
- NYJ – Mike Nugent 52-yard field goal, 2:48. Jets 20–7. Drive: 4 plays, 4 yards, 1:37.
- NYJ – Mike Nugent 45-yard field goal, 0:00. Jets 23–7. Drive: 6 plays, 34 yards, 0:46.

Third quarter

- NYJ – Mike Nugent 20-yard field goal, 4:27. Jets 26–7. Drive: 15 plays, 84 yards, 7:41.

Fourth quarter

- MIN – Mewelde Moore 35-yard pass from Tarvaris Jackson (pass failed), 6:15. Jets 26–13. Drive: 5 plays, 71 yards, 1:41.

Top passers

- NYJ – Chad Pennington – 29/39, 339 yards, TD, INT
- MIN – Tarvaris Jackson – 14/23, 177 yards, TD, INT

Top rushers

- NYJ – Cedric Houston – 21 rushes, 53 yards, TD
- MIN – Chester Taylor – 11 rushes, 38 yards

Top receivers

- NYJ – Laveranues Coles – 12 receptions, 144 yards, TD
- MIN – Travis Taylor – 6 receptions, 81 yards, TD

Following their win over the Lions, the Vikings went home for a Week 15 interconference fight with the New York Jets. In the first quarter, the Vikes took an early lead with quarterback Brad Johnson completing a 30-yard touchdown pass to wide receiver Travis Taylor. However, the Jets struck back with running back Cedric Houston with a 6-yard touchdown run. In the second quarter, things got bad for Minnesota. First, New York got a 25-yard field goal from kicker Mike Nugent. Then, quarterback Chad Pennington completed a 21-yard touchdown pass to wide receiver Laveranues Coles. Afterwards, Nugent kicked a 52-yard and a 45-yard field goal. In the third quarter, the Jets' lead increased with Nugent's 20-yard field goal for the only score of the period. In the fourth quarter, rookie quarterback Tarvaris Jackson came in a completed a 35-yard touchdown pass to running back Mewelde Moore. That was the only response from the Purple People Eaters. With the loss, the Vikings fell to 6–8.

==== Week 16: at Green Bay Packers ====
Week 16: Minnesota Vikings at Green Bay Packers – Game summary

Quarter	1	2	3	4	Total
Vikings	0	0	7	0	7
Packers	3	3	0	3	9

at Lambeau Field, Green Bay, Wisconsin

- Date: December 21
- Game time: 8:00 p.m. EST/7:00 p.m. CST
- Game weather: Rain, 36 °F (2 °C)
- Game attendance: 70,864
- Referee: Gene Steratore
- TV announcers (NFLN): Bryant Gumbel (play-by-play) and Cris Collinsworth (color commentator)
- Recap, Game Book

Game information

First quarter

- GB – Dave Rayner 38-yard field goal, 9:09. Packers 3–0. Drive: 9 plays, 44 yards, 3:42.

Second quarter

- GB – Dave Rayner 44-yard field goal, 0:00. Packers 6–0. Drive: 5 plays, 19 yards, 1:14.

Third quarter

- MIN – Fred Smoot 47-yard interception return (Ryan Longwell kick), 5:10. Vikings 7–6.

Fourth quarter

- GB – Dave Rayner 44-yard field goal, 1:34. Packers 9–7. Drive: 7 plays, 41 yards, 3:13.

Top passers

- MIN – Tarvaris Jackson – 10/20, 50 yards, INT
- GB – Brett Favre – 26/50, 285 yards, 2 INT

Top rushers

- MIN – Chester Taylor – 15 rushes, 49 yards
- GB – Ahman Green – 18 rushes, 42 yards

Top receivers

- MIN – Chester Taylor – 3 receptions, 18 yards
- GB – Donald Driver – 9 receptions, 99 yards

Trying to keep their slim playoff hopes alive, the Vikings flew to Lambeau Field for an NFC North rematch with the Green Bay Packers in a Thursday night fight. For this game, Minnesota gave rookie quarterback Tarvaris Jackson the start. In the first half, the Packers took an early lead as kicker Dave Rayner nailed a 38-yard field goal in the first quarter and a 44-yard field goal in the second quarter. In the third quarter, the Vikes took the lead with cornerback Fred Smoot returning an interception 47 yards for a touchdown. In the fourth quarter, Rayner gave Green Bay the win with a 44-yard field goal. With the loss, not only did the Vikings fall to 6–9, but they also got eliminated from the NFC playoff race.

A huge cause for Minnesota's loss was that the offense was only able to get three first downs the entire game. Also, in keeping with the fact that the Vikings were the most penalized team in the league in 2006, they committed 10 penalties for a loss of 68 yards.

==== Week 17: vs. St. Louis Rams ====
Week 17: St. Louis Rams at Minnesota Vikings – Game summary

Quarter	1	2	3	4	Total
Rams	10	14	10	7	41
Vikings	7	0	0	14	21

at Hubert H. Humphrey Metrodome, Minneapolis, Minnesota

- Date: December 31
- Game time: 1:00 p.m. EST/12:00 p.m. CST
- Game weather: Indoors
- Game attendance: 63,557
- Referee: Pete Morelli
- TV announcers (Fox): Dan McLaughlin (play-by-play) and Tony Boselli (color commentator)
- Recap, Game Book

Game information

First quarter

- STL – Ron Bartell 38-yard interception return (Jeff Wilkins kick), 13:38. Rams 7–0.
- STL – Jeff Wilkins 42-yard field goal, 6:44. Rams 10–0. Drive: 11 plays, 52 yards, 5:13.
- MIN – Tarvaris Jackson 1-yard run (Ryan Longwell kick), 2:04. Rams 10–7. Drive: 10 plays, 64 yards, 4:40.

Second quarter

- STL – Steven Jackson 4-yard run (Jeff Wilkins kick), 8:12. Rams 17–7. Drive: 6 plays, 53 yards, 2:25.
- STL – Steven Jackson 10-yard pass from Marc Bulger (Jeff Wilkins kick), 1:15. Rams 24–7. Drive: 11 plays, 79 yards, 5:04.

Third quarter

- STL – Jeff Wilkins 53-yard field goal, 11:24. Rams 27–7. Drive: 7 plays, 22 yards, 3:36.
- STL – Steven Jackson 2-yard run (Jeff Wilkins kick), 4:16. Rams 34–7. Drive: 12 plays, 73 yards, 6:04.

Fourth quarter

- STL – Steven Jackson 59-yard run (Jeff Wilkins kick), 11:09. Rams 41–7. Drive: 4 plays, 86 yards, 2:23.
- MIN – Chester Taylor 1-yard run (Ryan Longwell kick), 9:28. Rams 41–14. Drive: 3 plays, 35 yards, 1:41.
- MIN – Travis Taylor 3-yard pass from Tarvaris Jackson (Ryan Longwell kick), 2:21. Rams 41–21. Drive: 10 plays, 87 yards, 4:38.

Top passers

- STL – Marc Bulger – 19/30, 248 yards, TD
- MIN – Tarvaris Jackson – 20/34, 213 yards, TD, 2 INT

Top rushers

- STL – Steven Jackson – 25 rushes, 142 yards, 3 TD
- MIN – Tarvaris Jackson – 7 rushes, 34 yards, TD

Top receivers

- STL – Torry Holt – 9 receptions, 90 yards
- MIN – Mewelde Moore – 3 receptions, 57 yards

Trying to end their season on a high note, the Vikings went home for a Week 17 intraconference fight with the St. Louis Rams. In the first quarter, Minnesota trailed early as Rams defensive back Ronald Bartell returned an interception 38 yards for a touchdown. Also, kicker Jeff Wilkins helped St. Louis with a 42-yard field goal. Afterwards, the Vikings managed to score with quarterback Tarvaris Jackson getting a 1-yard touchdown run. However, in the second quarter, things got worse for the Vikes as Rams running back Steven Jackson got a 4-yard touchdown run and even a 10-yard touchdown pass from quarterback Marc Bulger. In the third quarter, things continued to get worse for Minnesota as Wilkins kicked a 53-yard field goal, while Jackson got a 2-yard touchdown run. In the fourth quarter, St. Louis wrapped up its domination with Jackson with a 59-yard touchdown run. Afterwards, the Vikes got its remaining points with running back Chester Taylor getting a 1-yard touchdown run, while Tarvaris Jackson completed a 3-yard touchdown pass to wide receiver Travis Taylor. With three straight losses to close out the season, the Vikings finished at 6–10.

=== Standings ===
NFC North
	W	L	T	PCT	DIV	CONF	PF	PA	STK
^{(1)} Chicago Bears	13	3	0	.813	5–1	11–1	427	255	L1
Green Bay Packers	8	8	0	.500	5–1	7–5	301	366	W4
Minnesota Vikings	6	10	0	.375	2–4	6–6	282	387	L3
Detroit Lions	3	13	0	.188	0–6	2–10	305	398	W1

== Statistics ==
=== Team leaders ===
Category	Player(s)	Value
Passing yards	Brad Johnson	2,750
Passing touchdowns	Brad Johnson	9
Rushing yards	Chester Taylor	1,216
Rushing touchdowns	Chester Taylor	6
Receiving yards	Travis Taylor	651
Receiving touchdowns	Marcus Robinson	4
Points	Ryan Longwell	90
Kickoff return yards	Bethel Johnson	1,054
Punt return yards	Mewelde Moore	364
Tackles	E. J. Henderson	110
Sacks	Darrion Scott	5.5
Interceptions	Darren Sharper; Dwight Smith; Antoine Winfield	4
Forced fumbles	Ben Leber	3

=== League rankings ===
Category	Total yards	Yards per game	NFL rank (out of 32)
Passing offense	3,123	195.2	18th
Rushing offense	1,820	113.8	16th
Total offense	4,943	308.9	23rd
Passing defense	3,818	238.6	31st (tied)
Rushing defense	985	61.6	1st
Total defense	4,803	300.2	8th
