= Joe Fields (disambiguation) =

Joe Fields (born 1953) is an American football center and guard

Joseph or Joe Fields may also refer to:

- Joe Fields (producer) (1929–2017), American record producer
- Joe Fields (safety) (born 1985), American football player
- Joseph Fields (1895–1966), American playwright

== See also ==
- Joseph Field (1774–1807), American pioneer
