= Nick Hayden =

American football player (born 1986)

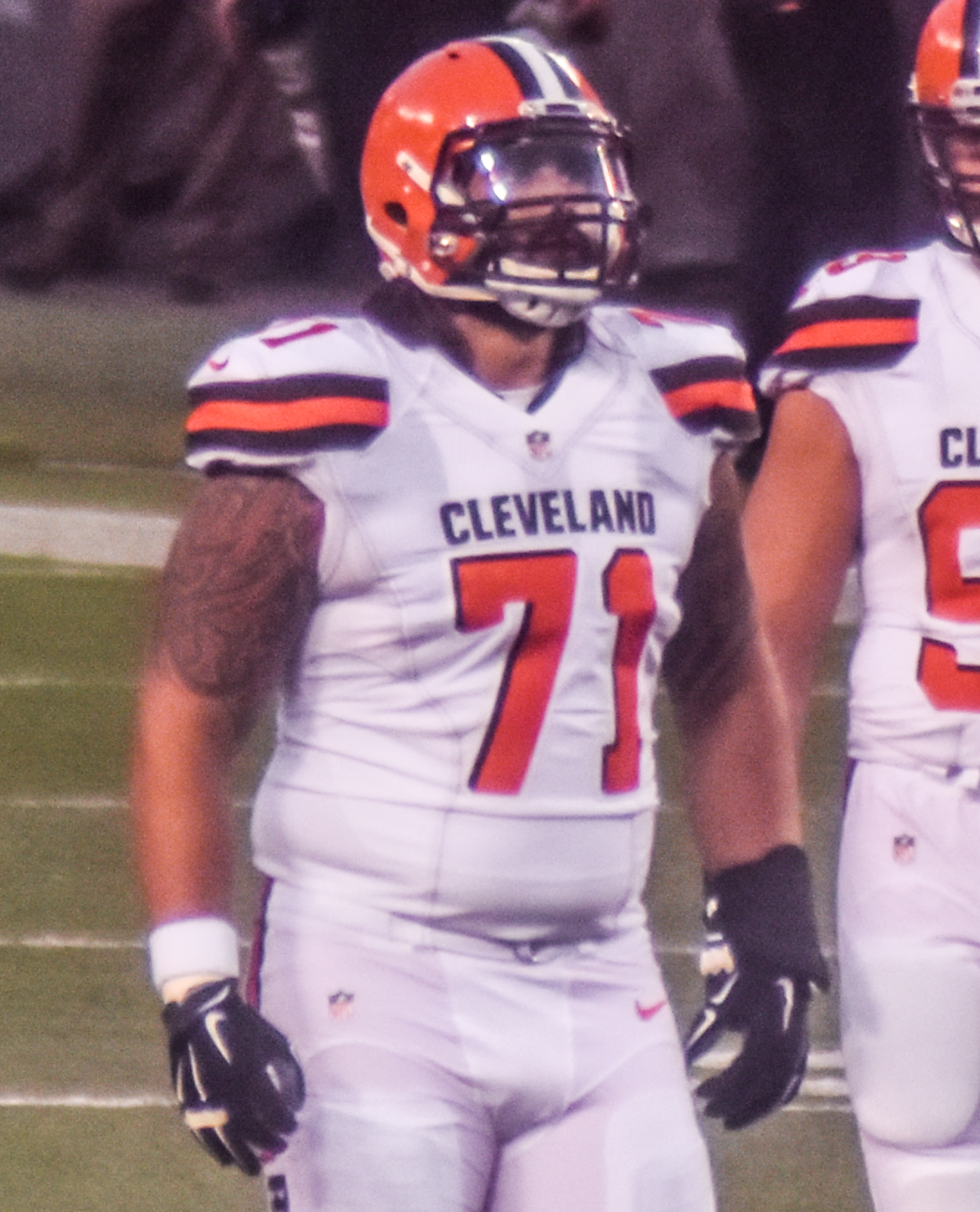
- Hayden with the Cleveland Browns in 2016

No. 78, 98, 96
- Position: Defensive tackle

Personal information
- Born: February 4, 1986 (age 40); Hartland, Wisconsin, U.S.
- Listed height: 6 ft 4 in (1.93 m)
- Listed weight: 303 lb (137 kg)

Career information
- High school: Arrowhead (Hartland)
- College: Wisconsin (2004–2007)
- NFL draft: 2008: 6th round, 181st overall pick

Career history
- Carolina Panthers (2008–2010); Cincinnati Bengals (2011); Dallas Cowboys (2013–2015); Cleveland Browns (2016)*
- * Offseason or practice squad member only

Career NFL statistics
- Games played: 76
- Total tackles: 183
- Sacks: 2
- Forced fumbles: 1
- Fumble recoveries: 2
- Defensive touchdowns: 1
- Stats at Pro Football Reference

Nick Hayden (born February 4, 1986) is an American former professional football player who was a defensive tackle in the National Football League (NFL) for the Carolina Panthers, Cincinnati Bengals, and Dallas Cowboys. He played college football for the Wisconsin Badgers and was selected by the Panthers in the sixth round of the 2008 NFL draft.

== Early life ==
Hayden attended Arrowhead High School, where he played as a defensive tackle, receiving All-State honors two straight years and the Defensive Lineman of the Year award in 2002.

He accepted a football scholarship from the University of Wisconsin–Madison. He became a starter at defensive tackle as a sophomore, registering 56 tackles, 5.5 sacks (led the team), one forced fumble, 4 passes defensed and 3 fumble recoveries. The next year, he had 27 tackles and one blocked kick. In his final season he posted 48 tackles, 4.5 sacks, 3 fumble recoveries (led the team), 2 passes defensed and one blocked kick.

In college, he started the final 39 games of his career, registering 132 tackles, 10 sacks, one forced fumble, 6 fumble recoveries (third most in school history), 6 passes defensed and 2 blocked kicks.

== Professional career ==
=== Carolina Panthers ===
Hayden was selected in the sixth round (181st overall) of the 2008 NFL draft by the Carolina Panthers. In 2010, he became a regular starter (10 games) at left defensive tackle, registering 51 tackles, one sack, 2 quarterback pressures and one pass defensed. He was waived on September 3, 2011.

=== Cincinnati Bengals ===
On December 7, 2011, he signed as a free agent with the Cincinnati Bengals and played in two games before being declared inactive for the rest of the regular season and the playoffs. The next year, he suffered a high ankle sprained in the last preseason game and was waived injured on August 31.

=== Dallas Cowboys ===
After not playing in 2012, he was signed to a futures contract by the Dallas Cowboys on February 10, 2013, to provide depth in training camp. The many injuries the team experienced in the defensive line allowed him to move up the depth chart and be named the team starter at left defensive tackle. Hayden proved to be a reliable player by starting all 16 games an playing solid against the run. He finished the year with the most tackles (51) and snaps (821) registered by a Cowboys defensive lineman. He also had 16 quarterback pressures, 2 tackles for loss, one forced fumble, one fumble recovery and one touchdown.

In 2014, he started 16 games and led the team's defensive linemen with 52 tackles, while also registering 4 tackles for loss (tied for second on the team), 8 quarterback pressures and one pass defensed.

In 2015, he didn't start against the New England Patriots, when the team opened with only 3 defensive linemen. He posted 15 starts, 54 tackles (4 for loss), 5 quarterback pressures and 2 passes defensed. He wasn't re-signed at the end of the season.

=== Cleveland Browns ===
On July 22, 2016, he was signed as a free agent by the Cleveland Browns to play defensive end in a 3–4 defense, who were looking to improve the depth at the defensive line after Desmond Bryant was lost for the year with a torn pectoral muscle. He was released on August 29.

== NFL career statistics ==
Year	Team	Games	Combined tackles	Tackles	Assisted tackles	Sacks	Forced fumbles	Fumble recoveries	Fumble return yards	Interceptions	Interception return yards	Yards per interception return	Interception Return	Interceptions returned for touchdown	Passes defended
2008	CAR	2	3	2	1	0.0	0	0	0	0	0	0	0	0	0
2009	CAR	10	17	15	2	1.0	0	0	0	0	0	0	0	0	0
2010	CAR	14	31	20	11	1.0	0	0	0	0	0	0	0	0	1
2011	CIN	2	2	2	0	0.0	0	0	0	0	0	0	0	0	0
2013	DAL	16	44	25	19	0.0	1	1	0	0	0	0	0	0	0
Career		44	97	64	33	2.0	1	1	0	0	0	0	0	0	1
