= Tyler Brayton =

American football player (born 1979)

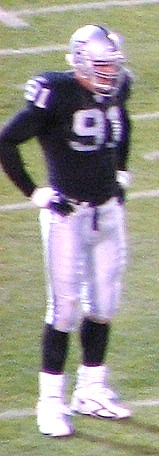
- Brayton with the Oakland Raiders in 2006

No. 91, 96
- Position: Defensive end

Personal information
- Born: November 20, 1979 (age 46); Richland, Washington, U.S.
- Listed height: 6 ft 6 in (1.98 m)
- Listed weight: 280 lb (127 kg)

Career information
- High school: Pasco (WA)
- College: Colorado
- NFL draft: 2003: 1st round, 32nd overall pick

Career history
- Oakland Raiders (2003–2007); Carolina Panthers (2008–2010); Indianapolis Colts (2011)

Awards and highlights
- PFWA All-Rookie Team (2003); Second-team All-Big 12 (2002)

Career NFL statistics
- Total tackles: 318
- Sacks: 17.5
- Forced fumbles: 6
- Fumble recoveries: 6
- Interceptions: 1
- Stats at Pro Football Reference

Tyler Brayton (born November 20, 1979) is an American former professional football player who was a defensive end in the National Football League (NFL). He was selected by the Oakland Raiders 32nd overall in the 2003 NFL draft. He played college football for the University of Colorado Boulder and professionally for the Oakland Raiders, Carolina Panthers, and Indianapolis Colts.

== College career ==
In 47 games at the University of Colorado, Brayton recorded 152 tackles with 12.5 sacks, 25 stops for losses, 34 quarterback pressures, 17 third-down hits, three fumble recoveries, three forced fumbles and six pass deflections.

== Professional career ==
Pre-draft measurables
Height	Weight	Arm length	Hand span	40-yard dash	10-yard split	20-yard split	20-yard shuttle	Three-cone drill	Vertical jump	Broad jump	Bench press
6 ft 6 1/8 in (1.98 m)	277 lb (126 kg)	34 in (0.86 m)	9 5/8 in (0.24 m)	4.75 s	1.66 s	2.80 s	4.31 s	7.14 s	34 in (0.86 m)	9 ft 8 in (2.95 m)	25 reps
All values from NFL Combine.

=== Oakland Raiders ===
Brayton was selected 32nd overall in the first round in 2003, after Oakland acquired the first-round pick from the eventual Super Bowl Champion Tampa Bay Buccaneers in exchange for head coach Jon Gruden at the end of the 2001 season. Gruden became the Buccaneers coach after Tony Dungy's firing, with the latter taking over as the Indianapolis Colts coach when Jim E. Mora was fired the same year. Brayton was one of two Raiders selected in the first round in 2003; the other was Nnamdi Asomugha. In his debut season, he played and started in all 16 games and finished the campaign with 61 tackles and 2.5 sacks. The following season, he recorded 45 tackles, 2.5 sacks and his first career interception at the Kansas City Chiefs on December 25. During the 2005 season, Brayton played in all 16 games, notching up three starts and finished the season with 16 tackles and one sack. In 2006, he finished with 42 tackles. In his final year with the Raiders, Brayton finished the season with 11 tackles.

On November 6, 2006, in a game against the Seattle Seahawks, Brayton kneed Seahawks tight end Jerramy Stevens in the groin after Stevens had kneed him, and was ejected. Brayton was later fined $25,000 by the NFL and Stevens was fined $15,000.

=== Carolina Panthers ===
On March 4, 2008, Brayton was signed by the Carolina Panthers. In his first season at the Panthers, he played and started in all 16 games and finished the campaign with 40 tackles and a career-high 4.5 sacks.

On December 12, 2010, in a game against the Atlanta Falcons, Tyler Brayton came off the bench and elbowed Atlanta Falcons cornerback Christopher Owens in the head while Owens was running along the Carolina sideline as part of the punt coverage unit. The NFL fined Tyler Brayton $15,000 for the illegal hit. Carolina released him on July 29, 2011.

=== Indianapolis Colts ===
Brayton signed with the Indianapolis Colts on August 15, 2011.

== NFL career statistics ==
Legend
**Bold**	Career high

=== Regular season ===
Year	Team	Games		Tackles					Interceptions					Fumbles			
Year	Team	GP	GS	Cmb	Solo	Ast	Sck	TFL	Int	Yds	TD	Lng	PD	FF	FR	Yds	TD
2003	OAK	**16**	**16**	**61**	**48**	**13**	2.5	**8**	0	0	0	0	1	0	1	0	0
2004	OAK	15	15	45	37	8	2.5	4	**1**	**24**	0	**24**	**7**	0	0	0	0
2005	OAK	**16**	3	22	20	2	1.0	0	0	0	0	0	0	1	0	0	0
2006	OAK	**16**	13	43	34	9	0.0	1	0	0	0	0	1	1	0	0	0
2007	OAK	**16**	0	12	10	2	0.0	2	0	0	0	0	1	0	1	0	0
2008	CAR	**16**	**16**	40	35	5	4.5	6	0	0	0	0	3	1	1	0	0
2009	CAR	15	15	46	37	9	**5.0**	6	0	0	0	0	1	**2**	1	0	0
2010	CAR	15	14	22	16	6	0.0	4	0	0	0	0	2	1	**2**	**1**	0
2011	IND	**16**	1	27	15	12	2.0	3	0	0	0	0	0	0	0	0	0
		141	93	318	252	66	17.5	34	1	24	0	24	16	6	6	1	0

=== Playoffs ===
Year	Team	Games		Tackles					Interceptions					Fumbles			
Year	Team	GP	GS	Cmb	Solo	Ast	Sck	TFL	Int	Yds	TD	Lng	PD	FF	FR	Yds	TD
2008	CAR	**1**	**1**	**4**	**3**	**1**	0.0	0	0	0	0	0	0	0	0	0	0
		1	1	4	3	1	0.0	0	0	0	0	0	0	0	0	0	0

== Personal life ==
Brayton is the grandson of former Washington State University baseball coach Bobo Brayton.

He now coaches football at Arapahoe High School.
