= Cullen Loeffler =

American football player (born 1981)

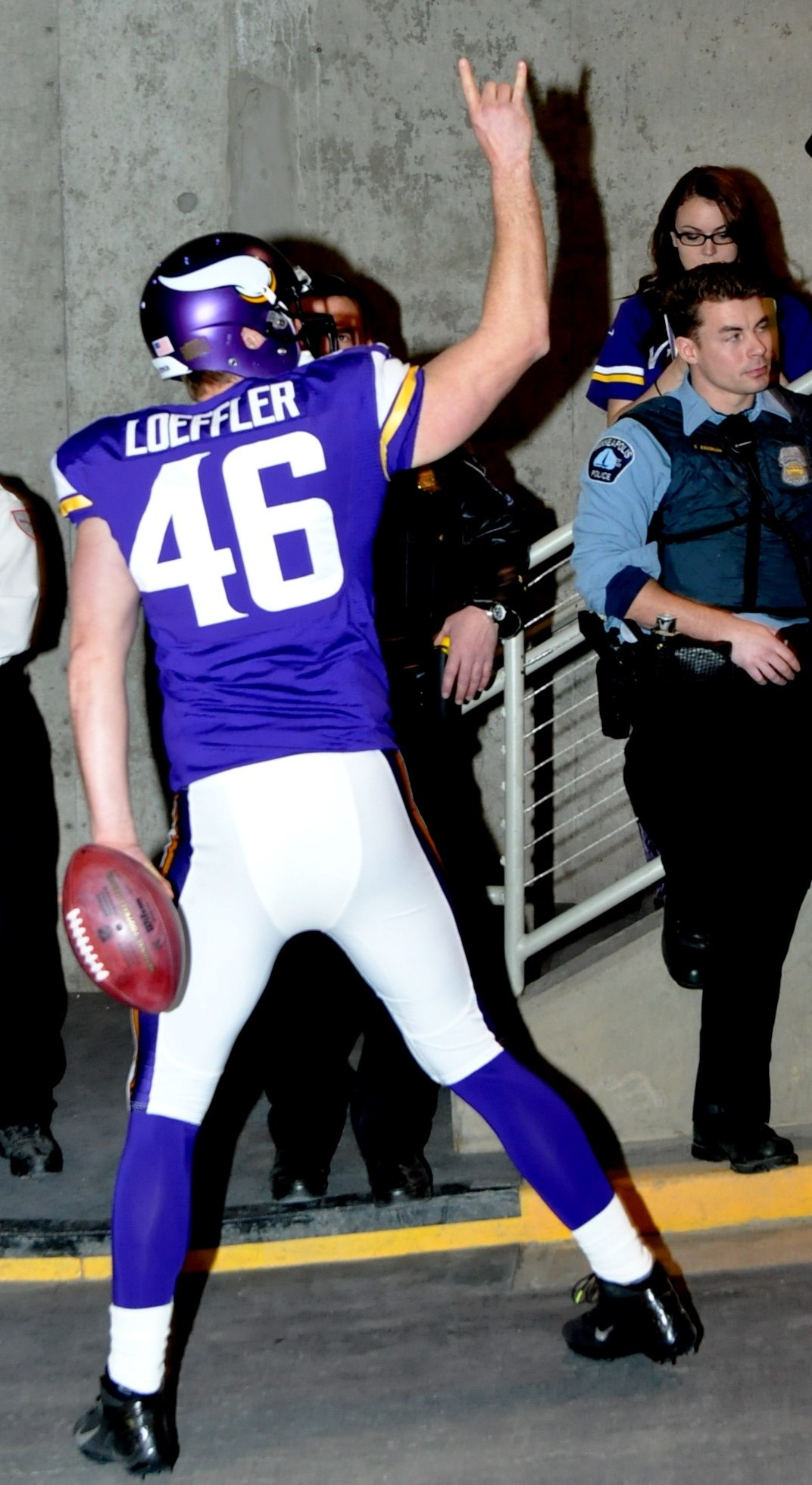
- Loeffler with the Vikings in 2013

No. 46
- Position: Long snapper

Personal information
- Born: January 27, 1981 (age 45); Washington, D.C., U.S.
- Listed height: 6 ft 5 in (1.96 m)
- Listed weight: 247 lb (112 kg)

Career information
- High school: Ingram (TX) Tom Moore
- College: Texas
- NFL draft: 2004: undrafted

Career history
- Minnesota Vikings (2004–2014)

Career NFL statistics
- Games played: 171
- Total tackles: 27
- Fumble recoveries: 1
- Stats at Pro Football Reference

Cullen Crawford Loeffler (born January 27, 1981) is an American former professional football player who was a long snapper in the National Football League (NFL). He played college football for the Texas Longhorns, and signed with the Vikings as an undrafted free agent in 2004.

== Early life ==
Loeffler attended Ingram Tom Moore High School in Ingram, Texas. He earned four varsity letters in both football and basketball. He also played in the UIL State Championship in doubles for tennis, winning the bronze in his junior year. Loeffler played several positions in high school football, including quarterback, wide receiver, tight end, defensive end and punter.

== College career ==
Loeffler turned down several scholarship opportunities to enroll and walk-on at the University of Texas. He was redshirted his first year at Texas. The following year, as a redshirt freshman, he played a few snaps as a tight end and on the kickoff return team, as well as serving as the team's backup long snapper; at the end of the 2000 season, he was picked for the Academic All-Big 12 second-team. He progressed to the Academic All-Big 12 first-team for the only time in 2001, after playing in all 13 of the Longhorns' games, exclusively as the long snapper on punts.

An ankle injury meant Loeffler missed the Longhorns' games against Houston and Tulane in 2002, but he finally took over long snapping duties for field goals and PATs for the last seven games of the season and was the team's Special Teams Player of the Week in week 2 for his two solo tackles against North Carolina. He then played in all 13 games in his senior year, and his performances earned him the Longhorns' Frank Denius Most Valuable Special Teams Player Award.

He graduated in 2004 with a degree in finance.

== Professional career ==
Loeffler was signed by the Minnesota Vikings as an undrafted free agent in 2004. The Vikings signed Loeffler to a three-year contract extension on October 7, 2011. He suffered a bone fracture in his lower back during a week 12 loss to the Atlanta Falcons and was placed on injured reserve on November 29, 2011, ending his season. In recognition of Loeffler's contribution to his record-breaking season, the Vikings' rookie kicker Blair Walsh offered to pay for Loeffler to join him in Hawaii for the 2013 Pro Bowl.

Until the release of kicker Ryan Longwell by the Vikings in 2011, Loeffler, Longwell and punter Chris Kluwe were the longest-serving special teams trio in the league.

During the 2014 off season Loeffler met a young entrepreneur Robbie Harrell on his way back home to Austin, TX according to the Twin Cities Business Magazine article "MN Viking Invests In 23-Year-Old's Ice Sculpture Business". Loeffler, was intrigued by Harrell's 1-year-old business called Minnesota Ice Sculptures. After negotiation between Loeffler and Harrell's old business partner, Loeffler purchased half of MN Ice Sculptures for a five figure sum. Since the start of their relationship Harrell and Loeffler have started another venture called Wholesale Androids, a premium cell phone distribution company.

Loeffler was cut from the Vikings on August 24, 2015, during the preseason.

== Personal life ==
Loeffler is the son of Tom Loeffler, a former Republican member of the United States House of Representatives who also played football for the University of Texas under Darrell Royal. Loeffler married his wife, Jardin, in the 2006 offseason; they have a daughter, Landyn, and a son, Senate.
