= Jason Carter (gridiron football) =

American gridiron football player (born 1982)

No. 11
- Position: Wide receiver

Personal information
- Born: September 15, 1982 (age 44); Caldwell, Texas, U.S.
- Listed height: 6 ft 0 in (1.83 m)
- Listed weight: 205 lb (93 kg)

Career information
- College: Texas A&M
- NFL draft: 2006: undrafted

Career history
- Minnesota Vikings (2006); Carolina Panthers (2007–2008); Toronto Argonauts (2009)
- Stats at Pro Football Reference

Jason Edward Carter (born September 15, 1982) is a former professional football wide receiver. He played for the Minnesota Vikings and Carolina Panthers of the National Football League (NFL). Carter played college football at Texas A&M.

== Early life ==
As a senior at Caldwell High School, Carter threw for 1,087 yards and rushed for 599 as a quarterback.

== College career ==
Carter played at Texas A&M as a QB/WR from the 2002–2005 seasons. During his four seasons on the team he had 6 receiving TDs and 5 rushing TDs. He majored in agriculture and life sciences.

== Professional career ==
=== Minnesota Vikings ===
Carter entered the NFL as undrafted rookie free agent, signing with the Minnesota Vikings in 2006. He signed with the team on May 3, 2006. He spent time on their active roster and practice squad throughout the 2006 season. He only saw playing time during the final game of the season against the St. Louis Rams, though he failed to make any receptions. He attended training camp with the Vikings in 2007 but was cut at the end of camp.

=== Carolina Panthers ===
He was signed to the Panthers practice squad on September 3, 2007, and 2010.

In the Panthers' 2008 offseason practices, Carter's play has stood out. Carter later tore his ACL and was placed on injured reserve ending his season.

A restricted free agent in the 2009 offseason, Carter was not tendered a contract by the Panthers. However, the team eventually re-signed him on April 7. He was waived on August 24 when the team signed safety Kevin Kaesviharn.

=== Toronto Argonauts ===
On September 1, 2009, the Toronto Argonauts of the Canadian Football League signed Carter to a practice roster agreement. Soon after, he would eventually join the active roster. Carter finished the 2009 CFL season with 43 receptions for 535 yards and 1 touchdown. On June 24, 2010, Carter was released by the Argonauts.
