= Joe Fields (safety) =

American football player (born 1985)

Profile
- Position: Safety

Personal information
- Born: October 5, 1985 (age 41); Houston, Texas
- Listed height: 6 ft 0 in (1.83 m)
- Listed weight: 201 lb (91 kg)

Career information
- College: Syracuse
- NFL draft: 2008: undrafted

Career history
- Carolina Panthers (2008–2009)

Awards and highlights
- Second-team All-Big East (2007)

Joseph J. Fields (born October 5, 1985, in Houston, Texas) is an American former football safety. He was signed by the Carolina Panthers as an undrafted free agent in 2008. He played college football at Syracuse.

== College career ==
At Syracuse, Fields began his career at Quarterback. But when Andrew Robinson became the starter and Tanard Jackson left for the NFL, Fields became a safety.

== NFL career ==
Fields played for the Carolina Panthers for a brief stint before getting cut due to injury. After being cut, he did not pursue a roster spot with another team

== Post-Athletic Career ==
Fields returned to his alma mater in 2010 as an academic graduate assistant. The next year, Fields was promoted to academic coordinator, working with the Orange football team. In 2012, Fields transitioned to work with the Orange men's basketball team. In 2017, Fields was named Associate AD for Academic Services at Texas A&M. Fields was promoted to Senior Associate AD for Student-Athlete Services at Texas A&M in March 2020.

In 2025, Fields was named athletic director at New Mexico State University.
