= Dick Hantak =

American football official (born 1938)

- Born: October 3, 1938 (age 87); St. Louis, Missouri, U.S.
- Education: Southeast Missouri State University
- Occupation: NFL official (1978–2003)

Dick Hantak (born October 3, 1938) is a former American football official in the National Football League (NFL). He was in the NFL for 25 years between 1978 and 2003. He began his NFL officiating career as a back judge and became a referee eight years later. During his career, he officiated in two Super Bowls, Super Bowl XVII in 1983 as a back judge and later as a referee in Super Bowl XXVII in 1993, both at the Rose Bowl in Pasadena, California, and selected as an alternate for Super Bowl XXXII in 1998. He was one of the first officials to wear a three-digit uniform number, wearing number 105 except for 1979–81, when officials were numbered separately by position.

== Education ==
Hantak is a 1960 graduate of Southeast Missouri State University and was a member of Sigma Tau Gamma.

== Career ==
Hantak was most notable for being involved in a game that would result in the elimination of the excessive crowd noise rule from the NFL because of the actions during an exhibition game preceding the 1989 NFL season between the Cincinnati Bengals and New Orleans Saints at the Louisiana Superdome. Prior to the snap to begin a play, Bengals quarterback Boomer Esiason constantly complained to Hantak about the loud crowd noise inside of the dome and would embellish his reactions in protest over the newly created rule. Esiason would later admit that he was put up to the task by then head coach Sam Wyche.

Hantak was also involved in a humorous incident during a 1996 game between Pittsburgh and Carolina. On a punt the ball landed in the endzone and the Carolina mascot Sir Purr downed it, unaware the ball was live. While Steelers coach Bill Cowher was laughing, Hantak told Sir Purr not to do it again. Hantak ended his distinguished officiating career with a playoff game on January 11, 2003, between the Oakland Raiders and New York Jets.

As of the 2006 NFL season, Hantak serves as an NFL replay official, working on-site in the video officiating booth.

== Personal life ==
Hantak's brother, Bob, worked as a National League umpire during the 1979 Major League Baseball Umpires Association strike.
