= Carolina Panthers draft history =

This is a list of the Carolina Panthers' NFL draft selections:

== Key ==
= Pro Bowl
= MVP
= Hall of Famer

== Selections by year ==
=== 1995 NFL draft ===
Round #	Pick #	Overall pick #	Player	Position	College
1	5	5	Kerry Collins	Quarterback	Penn State
1	22	22	Tyrone Poole	Cornerback	Fort Valley State
1	29	29	Blake Brockermeyer	Offensive tackle	Texas
2	4	36	Shawn King	Defensive end	NE Louisiana
4	34	132	Frank Garcia	Center	Washington
5	1	135	Michael Senters	Wide receiver	Northwestern
5	37	171	Andrew Peterson	Offensive tackle	Washington
6	17	188	Steve Strahan	Defensive tackle	Baylor
6	20	191	Jerry Colquitt	Quarterback	Tennessee
7	1	209	Chad Cota	Safety	Oregon
7	41	249	Michael Reed	Cornerback	Boston College

=== 1996 NFL draft ===
Round #	Pick #	Overall pick #	Player	Position	College
1	8	8	Tim Biakabutuka	Running back	Michigan
2	13	43	Muhsin Muhammad	Wide receiver	Michigan State
3	12	73	Winslow Oliver	Running back	New Mexico
3	27	88	J. C. Price	Defensive tackle	Virginia Tech
4	11	106	Norberto Garrido	Guard	USC
4	16	111	Emmanuel McDaniel	Defensive back	East Carolina
5	10	142	Marquette Smith	Running back	Central Florida
6	26	193	Scott Greene	Running back	Michigan State
7	8	217	Donnell Baker	Wide receiver	Southern
7	25	234	Kerry Hicks	Defensive tackle	Colorado

=== 1997 NFL draft ===
Round #	Pick #	Overall pick #	Player	Position	College
1	27	27	Rae Carruth	Wide receiver	Colorado
2	26	56	Mike Minter	Safety	Nebraska
3	27	87	Kinnon Tatum	Linebacker	Notre Dame
4	26	122	Tarek Saleh	Defensive end	Wisconsin
6	26	189	Matt Finkes	Defensive end	Ohio State
7	27	228	Kris Mangum	Tight end	Ole Miss

=== 1998 NFL draft ===
Round #	Pick #	Overall pick #	Player	Position	College
1	14	14	Jason Peter	Defensive tackle	Nebraska
3	1	62	Chuck Wiley	Defensive end	LSU
3	12	73	Mitch Marrow	Defensive end	Pennsylvania
4	14	106	Donald Hayes	Wide receiver	Wisconsin
5	13	136	Jerry Jensen	Linebacker	Washington
6	12	165	Damien Richardson	Defensive back	Arizona State
7	7	196	Viliami Maumau	Defensive tackle	Colorado
7	39	228	Jim Turner	Wide receiver	Syracuse

=== 1999 NFL draft ===
Round #	Pick #	Overall pick #	Player	Position	College
2	3	34	Chris Terry	Tackle	Georgia
2	7	38	Mike Rucker	Defensive end	Nebraska
4	5	100	Hannibal Navies	Linebacker	Colorado
6	6	175	Robert Daniel	Defensive end	Northwest Louisiana
7	5	211	Tony Booth	Defensive back	James Madison

=== 2000 NFL draft ===
Round #	Pick #	Overall pick #	Player	Position	College
1	23	23	Rashard Anderson	Defensive back	Jackson State
2	26	57	Deon Grant	Safety	Tennessee
3	20	82	Leander Jordan	Guard	Indiana (PA)
4	26	120	Alvin McKinley	Defensive tackle	Mississippi State
5	18	147	Gillis Wilson	Defensive end	Southern
6	16	182	Jeno James	Guard	Auburn
7	15	221	Lester Towns	Linebacker	Washington

=== 2001 NFL draft ===
Round #	Pick #	Overall pick #	Player	Position	College
1	11	11	Dan Morgan	Linebacker	Miami (FL)
2	13	44	Kris Jenkins	Defensive tackle	Maryland
3	12	74	Steve Smith	Wide receiver	Utah
4	11	106	Chris Weinke	Quarterback	Florida State
5	12	143	Jarrod Cooper	Safety	Kansas State
6	12	175	Dee Brown	Defensive back	Syracuse
7	11	211	Louis Williams	Center	LSU
7	27	277	Mike Roberg	Tight end	Idaho

=== 2002 NFL draft ===
Round #	Pick #	Overall pick #	Player	Position	College
1	2	2	Julius Peppers	Defensive end	North Carolina
2	2	34	DeShaun Foster	Running back	UCLA
3	8	73	Will Witherspoon	Linebacker	Georgia
4	2	100	Dante Wesley	Defensive back	Arkansas-Pine Bluff
5	2	137	Randy Fasani	Quarterback	Stanford
5	10	145	Kyle Johnson	Running back	Syracuse
6	2	174	Keith Heinrich	Tight end	Sam Houston State
7	2	213	Pete Campion	Guard	North Dakota State
7	47	258	Brad Franklin	Defensive back	Louisiana-Lafayette

=== 2003 NFL draft ===
Round #	Pick #	Overall pick #	Player	Position	College
1	8	8	Jordan Gross	Tackle	Utah
2	18	50	Bruce Nelson	Center	Iowa
3	12	76	Mike Seidman	Tight end	UCLA
3	18	82	Ricky Manning	Cornerback	UCLA
4	22	119	Colin Branch	Safety	Stanford
5	10	145	Kindal Moorehead	Defensive end	Alabama
7	12	226	Walter Young	Wide receiver	Illinois
7	33	247	Casey Moore	Running back	Stanford

=== 2004 NFL draft ===
Round #	Pick #	Overall pick #	Player	Position	College
1	28	28	Chris Gamble	Cornerback	Ohio State
2	30	62	Keary Colbert	Wide receiver	USC
3	31	94	Travelle Wharton	Tackle	South Carolina
5	31	163	Drew Carter	Wide receiver	Ohio State
6	31	196	Sean Tufts	Linebacker	Colorado
7	31	232	Michael Gaines	Tight end	Central Florida

=== 2005 NFL draft ===
Round #	Pick #	Overall pick #	Player	Position	College
1	14	14	Thomas Davis	Linebacker	Georgia
2	22	54	Eric Shelton	Running back	North Carolina
3	15	79	Evan Mathis	Guard	Alabama
3	25	89	Atiyyah Ellison	Defensive tackle	Missouri
4	20	121	Stefan LeFors	Quarterback	Louisville
5	13	148	Adam Seward	Linebacker	UNLV
5	33	169	Geoff Hangartner	Center	Texas A&M
5	35	171	Ben Emanuel	Defensive back	UCLA
6	15	189	Jovan Haye	Defensive end	Vanderbilt
6	33	207	Joe Berger	Tackle	Michigan Tech

=== 2006 NFL draft ===
Round #	Pick #	Overall pick #	Player	Position	College
1	27	27	DeAngelo Williams	Running back	Memphis
2	26	58	Richard Marshall	Cornerback	Fresno State
3	24	88	James Anderson	Linebacker	Virginia Tech
3	25	89	Rashad Butler	Tackle	Miami (FL)
4	24	121	Nate Salley	Safety	Ohio State
5	23	155	Jeff King	Tight end	Virginia Tech
7	26	234	Will Montgomery	Guard	Virginia Tech
7	29	237	Stanley McClover	Defensive end	Auburn

=== 2007 NFL draft ===
Round #	Pick #	Overall pick #	Player	Position	College
1	25	25	Jon Beason	Linebacker	Miami
2	13	45	Dwayne Jarrett	Wide receiver	USC
2	27	59	Ryan Kalil	Center	USC
3	20	83	Charles Johnson	Defensive end	Georgia
4	19	118	Ryne Robinson	Wide receiver	Miami (OH)
5	18	155	Dante Rosario	Tight end	Oregon
5	27	164	Tim Shaw	Linebacker	Penn State
7	16	226	C.J. Wilson	Cornerback	Baylor University

=== 2008 NFL draft ===
Round #	Pick #	Overall pick #	Player	Position	College
1	13	13	Jonathan Stewart	Running back	Oregon
1	19	19	Jeff Otah	Tackle	Pittsburgh
3	4	67	Charles Godfrey	Cornerback	Iowa
3	11	74	Dan Connor	Linebacker	Penn State
5	6	141	Gary Barnidge	Tight end	Louisville
6	15	181	Nick Hayden	Defensive tackle	Wisconsin
7	14	221	Hilee Taylor	Defensive end	North Carolina
7	34	241	Geoff Schwartz	Tackle	Oregon
7	43	250	Mackenzy Bernadeau	Guard	Bentley

=== 2009 NFL draft ===
Round #	Pick #	Overall pick #	Player	Position	College
2	11	43	Everette Brown	Defensive end	Florida State
2	27	59	Sherrod Martin	Safety	Troy
3	29	93	Corvey Irvin	Defensive tackle	Georgia
4	11	111	Mike Goodson	Running back	Texas A&M
4	28	128	Tony Fiammetta	Fullback	Syracuse
5	27	163	Duke Robinson	Tackle	Oklahoma
7	7	216	Captain Munnerlyn	Cornerback	South Carolina

=== 2010 NFL draft ===
Round #	Pick #	Overall pick #	Player	Position	College
2	16	48	Jimmy Clausen	Quarterback	Notre Dame
3	14	78	Brandon LaFell	Wide receiver	LSU
3	25	89	Armanti Edwards	Quarterback/Wide receiver	Appalachian State
4	26	124	Eric Norwood	Linebacker	South Carolina
6	6	175	Greg Hardy	Defensive end	Ole Miss
6	29	198	David Gettis	Wide receiver	Baylor
6	33	202	Jordan Pugh	Safety	Texas A&M
6	35	204	Tony Pike	Quarterback	Cincinnati
7	16	223	R.J. Stanford	Cornerback	Utah
7	42	249	Robert McClain	Cornerback	Connecticut

=== 2011 NFL draft ===
Round #	Pick #	Overall pick #	Player	Position	College
1	1	1	Cam Newton	Quarterback	Auburn
3	1	65	Terrell McClain	Defensive tackle	South Florida
3	33	97	Sione Fua	Defensive tackle	Stanford
4	1	98	Brandon Hogan	Cornerback	West Virginia
5	1	132	Kealoha Pilares	Wide receiver	Hawaii
6	1	166	Lawrence Wilson	Linebacker	Connecticut
6	38	203	Zachary Williams	Center	Washington State
7	41	244	Lee Ziemba	Tackle	Auburn

=== 2012 NFL draft ===
Round #	Pick #	Overall pick #	Player	Position	College
1	9	9	Luke Kuechly	Linebacker	Boston College
2	8	40	Amini Silatolu	Guard	Midwestern State
4	8	103	Frank Alexander	Defensive end	Oklahoma
4	9	104	Joe Adams	Wide receiver	Arkansas
5	8	143	Josh Norman	Cornerback	Coastal Carolina
6	37	207	Brad Nortman	Punter	Wisconsin
7	9	216	D. J. Campbell	Free safety	California

=== 2013 NFL draft ===
Round #	Pick #	Overall pick #	Player	Position	College
1	14	14	Star Lotulelei	Defensive tackle	Utah
2	12	44	Kawann Short	Defensive tackle	Purdue
4	11	108	Edmund Kugbila	Offensive guard	Valdosta State
5	15	148	A. J. Klein	Linebacker	Iowa State
6	14	182	Kenjon Barner	Running back	Oregon

=== 2014 NFL draft ===
Round #	Pick #	Overall pick #	Player	Position	College
1	28	28	Kelvin Benjamin	Wide receiver	Florida State
2	28	60	Kony Ealy	Defensive end	Missouri
3	28	92	Trai Turner	Offensive guard	LSU
4	28	128	Tre Boston	Safety	North Carolina
5	8	148	Bené Benwikere	Cornerback	San Jose State
6	28	204	Tyler Gaffney	Running back	Stanford

=== 2015 NFL draft ===
Round #	Pick #	Overall pick #	Player	Position	College
1	25	25	Shaq Thompson	Linebacker	Washington
2	9	41	Devin Funchess	Wide receiver	Michigan
4	3	102	Daryl Williams	Offensive tackle	Oklahoma
5	33	169	David Mayo	Linebacker	Texas State
5	38	174	Cameron Artis-Payne	Running back	Auburn

=== 2016 NFL draft ===
Round #	Pick #	Overall pick #	Player	Position	College
1	31	31	Vernon Butler	Defensive tackle	LA Tech
2	31	62	James Bradberry	Cornerback	Samford
3	14	77	Daryl Worley	Cornerback	West Virginia
5	2	141	Zack Sanchez	Cornerback	Oklahoma
7	31	252	Beau Sandland	Tight end	Montana State

=== 2017 NFL draft ===
Round #	Pick #	Overall pick #	Player	Position	College
1	8	8	Christian McCaffrey	Running back	Stanford
2	8	40	Curtis Samuel	Wide receiver	Ohio State
2	32	64	Taylor Moton	Offensive tackle	Western Michigan
3	13	77	Daeshon Hall	Defensive end	Texas A&M
5	8	152	Corn Elder	Cornerback	Miami
6	8	192	Alex Armah	Fullback	West Georgia
7	15	233	Harrison Butker	Kicker	Georgia Tech

=== 2018 NFL draft ===
Round #	Pick #	Overall pick #	Player	Position	College
1	24	24	D. J. Moore	Wide receiver	Maryland
2	23	55	Donte Jackson	Cornerback	LSU
3	21	85	Rashaan Gaulden	Safety	Tennessee
4	1	101	Ian Thomas	Tight end	Indiana
4	36	136	Marquis Haynes	Defensive end	Ole Miss
5	24	161	Jermaine Carter	Linebacker	Maryland
7	16	234	Andre Smith	Linebacker	North Carolina
7	24	242	Kendrick Norton	Defensive tackle	Miami (FL)

=== 2019 NFL draft ===
Round #	Pick #	Overall pick #	Player	Position	College
1	16	16	Brian Burns	Defensive end	Florida State
2	5	37	Greg Little	Offensive tackle	Ole Miss
3	37	100	Will Grier	Quarterback	West Virginia
4	13	115	Christian Miller	Linebacker	Alabama
5	36	154	Jordan Scarlett	Running back	Florida
6	40	212	Dennis Daley	Offensive tackle	South Carolina
7	23	237	Terry Godwin	Wide receiver	Georgia

=== 2020 NFL draft ===
Round #	Pick #	Overall pick #	Player	Position	College
1	7	7	Derrick Brown	Defensive tackle	Auburn
2	5	38	Yetur Gross-Matos	Defensive end	Penn State
2	32	64	Jeremy Chinn	Safety	Southern Illinois
4	7	113	Troy Pride Jr	Cornerback	Notre Dame
5	6	152	Kenny Robinson	Safety	West Virginia
6	5	184	Bravvion Roy	Defensive tackle	Baylor
7	7	221	Stantley Thomas-Oliver III	Cornerback	Florida International

=== 2021 NFL draft ===
Round #	Pick #	Overall pick #	Player	Position	College
1	8	8	Jaycee Horn	Cornerback	South Carolina
2	27	59	Terrace Marshall Jr.	Wide receiver	LSU
3	6	70	Brady Christensen	Offensive tackle	BYU
3	20	83	Tommy Tremble	Tight end	Notre Dame
4	21	126	Chuba Hubbard	Running back	Oklahoma State
5	14	158	Daviyon Nixon	Defensive tackle	Iowa
5	22	166	Keith Taylor	Cornerback	Washington
6	9	193	Deonte Brown	Guard	Alabama
6	20	204	Shi Smith	Wide receiver	South Carolina
6	38	222	Thomas Fletcher	Long snapper	Alabama
7	4	232	Phil Hoskins	Defensive tackle	Kentucky

=== 2022 NFL draft ===
Round #	Pick #	Overall pick #	Player	Position	College
1	6	6	Ikem Ekwonu	Offensive tackle	NC State
3	30	94	Matt Corral	Quarterback	Ole Miss
4	15	120	Brandon Smith	Linebacker	Penn State
6	10	189	Amaré Barno	Defensive end	Virginia Tech
6	21	199	Cade Mays	Guard	Tennessee
7	21	242	Kalon Barnes	Cornerback	Baylor

=== 2023 NFL draft ===
Round #	Pick #	Overall pick #	Player	Position	College
1	1	1	Bryce Young	Quarterback	Alabama
2	8	39	Jonathan Mingo	Wide receiver	Ole Miss
3	17	80	D. J. Johnson	Defensive end	Oregon
4	12	114	Chandler Zavala	Guard	NC State
5	10	145	Jammie Robinson	Safety	Florida State

=== 2024 NFL draft ===
Round #	Pick #	Overall pick #	Player	Position	College
1	32	32	Xavier Legette	Wide receiver	South Carolina
2	14	46	Jonathon Brooks	Running back	Texas
3	8	72	Trevin Wallace	Linebacker	Kentucky
4	1	101	Ja'Tavion Sanders	Tight end	Texas
5	22	157	Chau Smith-Wade	Cornerback	Washington State
6	24	200	Jaden Crumedy	Defensive tackle	Mississippi State
7	20	240	Michael Barrett	Linebacker	Michigan
