= Carolina Panthers =

NFL team in Charlotte, North Carolina

- Current season
Logo	Wordmark
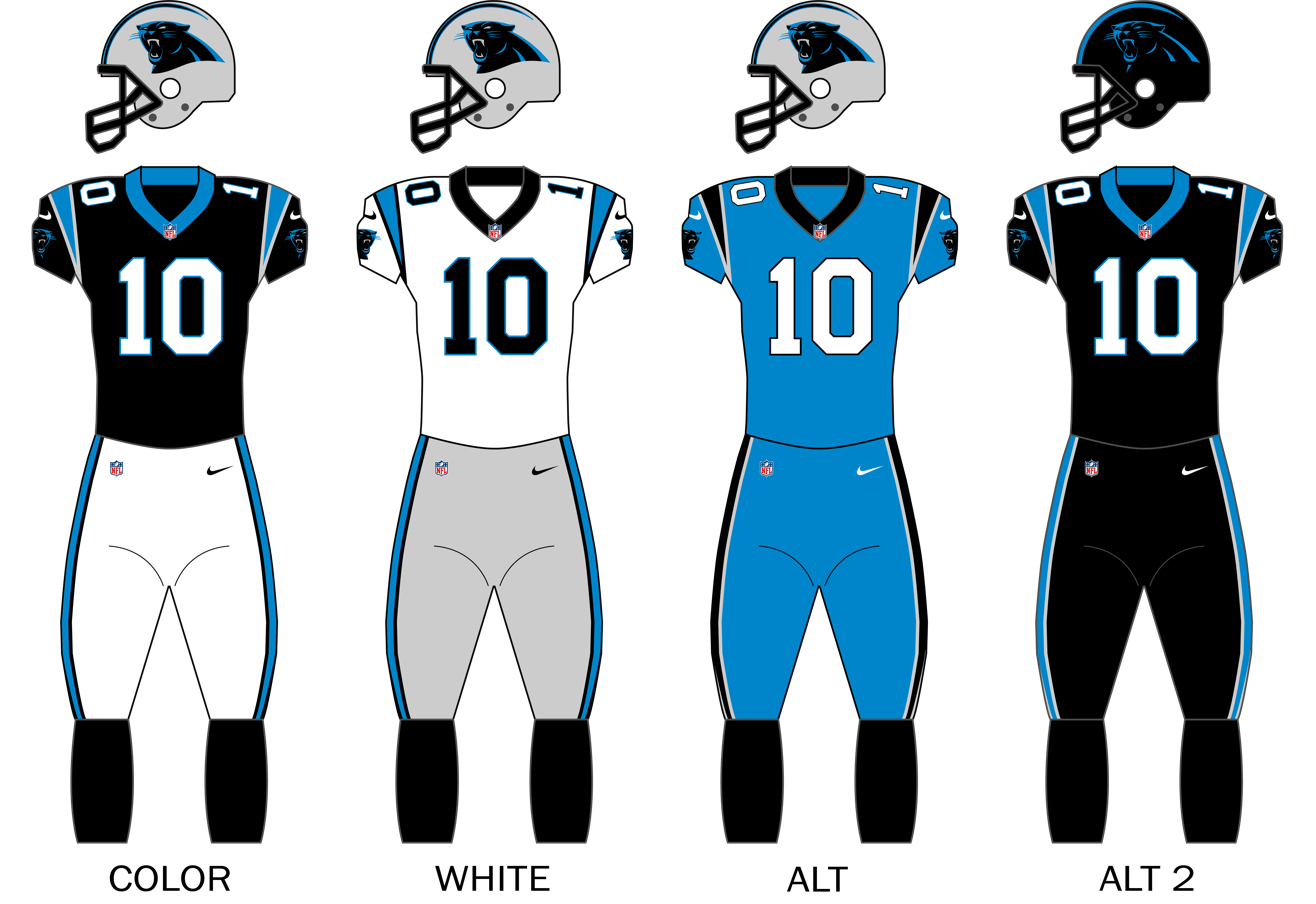
- Uniforms

General information
- Founded: October 26, 1993; 33 years ago
- Stadium: Bank of America Stadium Charlotte, North Carolina
- Headquartered: Charlotte, North Carolina, U.S.
- Colors: Black, process blue, silver
- Mascot: Sir Purr
- Website: panthers.com

Personnel
- Owner: David Tepper
- General manager: Dan Morgan
- Head coach: Dave Canales
- President: Kristi Coleman

Nickname
- Cardiac Cats (2003)

Team history
- Carolina Panthers (1995–present)

Home fields
- Memorial Stadium (1995); Bank of America Stadium (1996–present)

League / conference affiliations
- National Football League (1995–present): National Football Conference (1995–present); NFC West (1995–2001); NFC South (2002–present)

Championships
- Conference championships: 2: NFC: 2003, 2015
- Division championships: 7: NFC West: 1996; NFC South: 2003, 2008, 2013, 2014, 2015, 2025

Playoff appearances (9)
- NFL: 1996, 2003, 2005, 2008, 2013, 2014, 2015, 2017, 2025

Owners
- Jerry Richardson (1993–2018); David Tepper (2018–present)

The Carolina Panthers are a professional American football team based in Charlotte, North Carolina. The Panthers compete in the National Football League (NFL) as a member of the National Football Conference (NFC) South division. They play their home games at Bank of America Stadium in Uptown Charlotte, which also houses the team's headquarters. The franchise represents both North Carolina and South Carolina; while its Charlotte stadium was under construction, the Panthers played their inaugural 1995 season at Memorial Stadium in Clemson, South Carolina.

The NFL awarded the Carolinas its 29th franchise in 1993, and the Panthers began play in 1995 under founder Jerry Richardson. They reached the NFC Championship Game in their second season. The Panthers have won seven division titles and two NFC championships, advancing to Super Bowl XXXVIII after the 2003 season and Super Bowl 50 after the 2015 season, losing both. The 2015 team finished 15–1, and quarterback Cam Newton was named the NFL's Most Valuable Player. In 2025, Carolina won the NFC South with an 8–9 record and returned to the playoffs for the first time since 2017, losing 34–31 to the Los Angeles Rams in the Wild Card Round.

In December 2017, Richardson announced that he would sell the franchise amid allegations of workplace misconduct; the NFL assumed control of the investigation. An independent investigation later found evidence substantiating the allegations, and the NFL fined Richardson $2.75 million. The sale to David Tepper closed in July 2018.

== History ==
=== Beginnings ===
On December 15, 1987, entrepreneur Jerry Richardson announced his bid for an NFL expansion franchise in the Carolinas. A North Carolina native, Richardson was a former wide receiver on the Baltimore Colts who had used his 1959 league championship bonus to co-franchise the first Hardee's restaurant in Spartanburg, SC, eventually expanding to a chain of franchises as co-founder of Spartan Food Systems before becoming president and CEO of Flagstar. Richardson drew his inspiration to pursue an NFL franchise from George Shinn, who had made a successful bid for an expansion National Basketball Association (NBA) team in Charlotte, the Charlotte Hornets. Richardson founded Richardson Sports, a partnership consisting of himself, his family, and a number of businessmen from North and South Carolina who were also recruited to be limited partners. Richardson looked at four potential locations for a stadium, ultimately choosing uptown Charlotte.

To highlight the demand for professional football in the Carolinas, Richardson Sports held preseason games around the area from 1989 to 1991. The first two games were held at Carter–Finley Stadium in Raleigh, North Carolina, and Kenan Memorial Stadium in Chapel Hill, North Carolina, while the third and final game was held at Williams-Brice Stadium in Columbia, South Carolina. The matchups were between existing NFL teams. In 1991, the group formally filed an application for the open expansion spot, and on October 26, 1993, the 28 NFL owners unanimously named the Carolina Panthers as the 29th member of the NFL. In the 1995 NFL draft, the Panthers selected quarterback Kerry Collins out of Penn State with their first ever draft selection.

=== Jerry Richardson era (1995–2017) ===
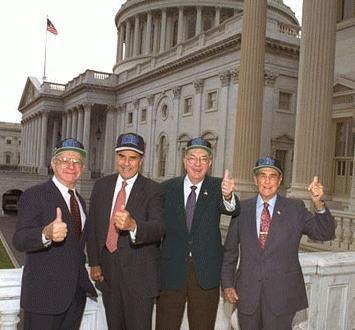
U.S. Senators Lauch Faircloth (North Carolina), Bob Dole (Kansas), Jesse Helms (North Carolina), and Strom Thurmond (South Carolina) show their enthusiasm for the newly created Carolina Panthers

The Panthers first competed in the 1995 NFL season; they were one of two expansion teams to begin playing that year, the other being the Jacksonville Jaguars. The Panthers were put in the NFC West to increase the size of that division to five teams; there were already two other southeastern teams in the division, the Atlanta Falcons and the New Orleans Saints. Former Pittsburgh Steelers defensive coordinator Dom Capers was named the first head coach. The Panthers played their first regular season game in Week 1 of the 1995 season. The team fell to the Atlanta Falcons 23–20 in overtime. After a 0–5 start, with three close losses, the Panthers won their first game in franchise history, a 26–15 win over the New York Jets. The team finished its inaugural season 7–9, the best performance ever from a first-year expansion team. They performed even better in their second season, finishing with a 12–4 record and winning the NFC West division, as well as securing a first-round bye. The Panthers beat the defending Super Bowl champions Dallas Cowboys in the divisional round 26–17 before losing the NFC Championship Game to the eventual Super Bowl champions, the Green Bay Packers 30–13. The team managed only a 7–9 finish in 1997 and slipped to 4–12 in 1998, leading to Capers' dismissal as head coach.

The Panthers hired former San Francisco 49ers head coach George Seifert to replace Capers, and he led the team to an 8–8 record in 1999. The team finished 7–9 in 2000 and fell to 1–15 in 2001, winning their first game but losing their last 15. This performance tied the NFL record for most losses in a single season, and it broke the record held by the winless 1976 Buccaneers for most consecutive losses in a single season (both records have since been broken by the 2008 Lions), leading the Panthers to fire Seifert. One highlight from the loss-ridden 2001 season was the drafting of future franchise wide receiver Steve Smith. He was a third-round selection in the 2001 NFL draft by the team.

==== John Fox years (2002–2010) ====
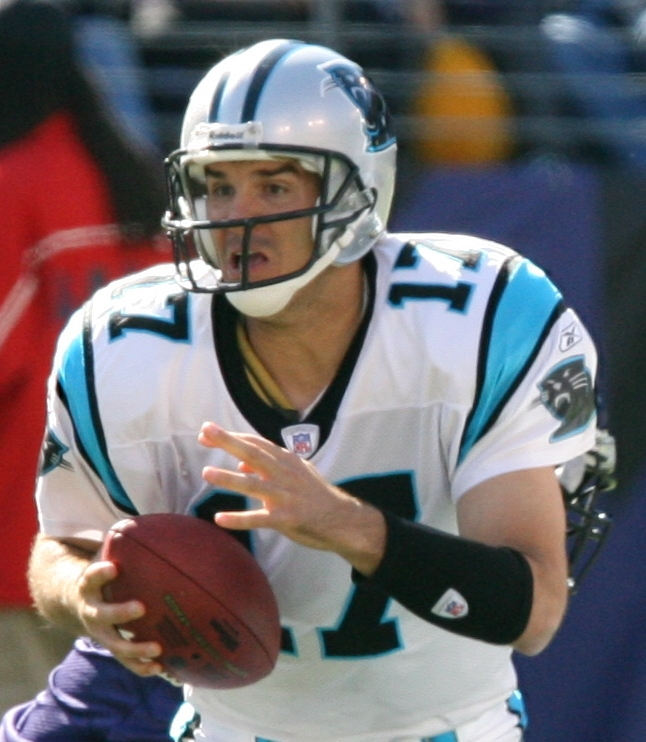
Jake Delhomme with the Panthers in 2006. Delhomme led the Panthers to three postseason appearances and an appearance in Super Bowl XXXVIII.

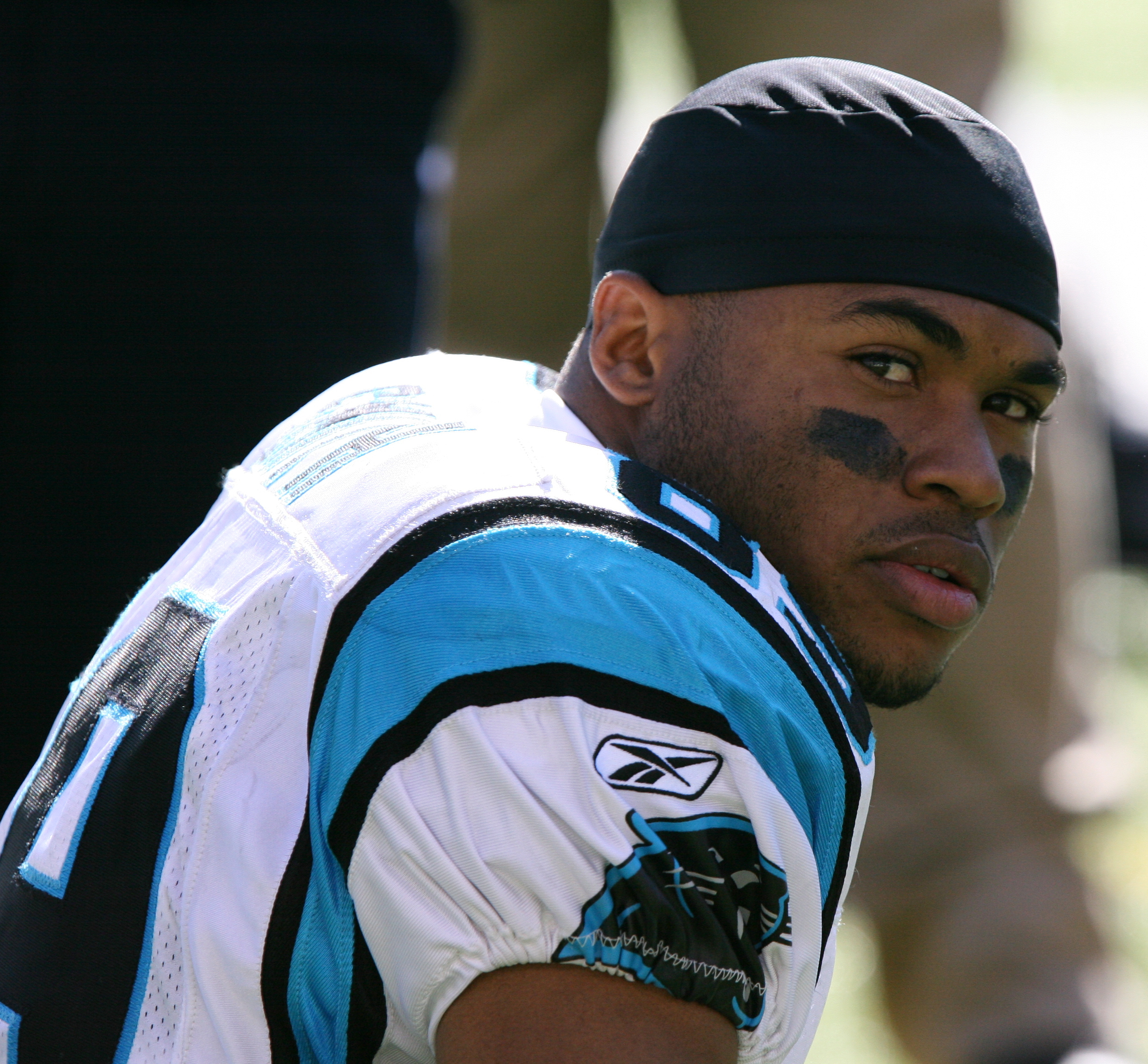
Steve Smith played wide receiver for the Panthers from 2001 to 2013. In 2005, Smith led the NFL in receptions, receiving yards, and touchdowns.

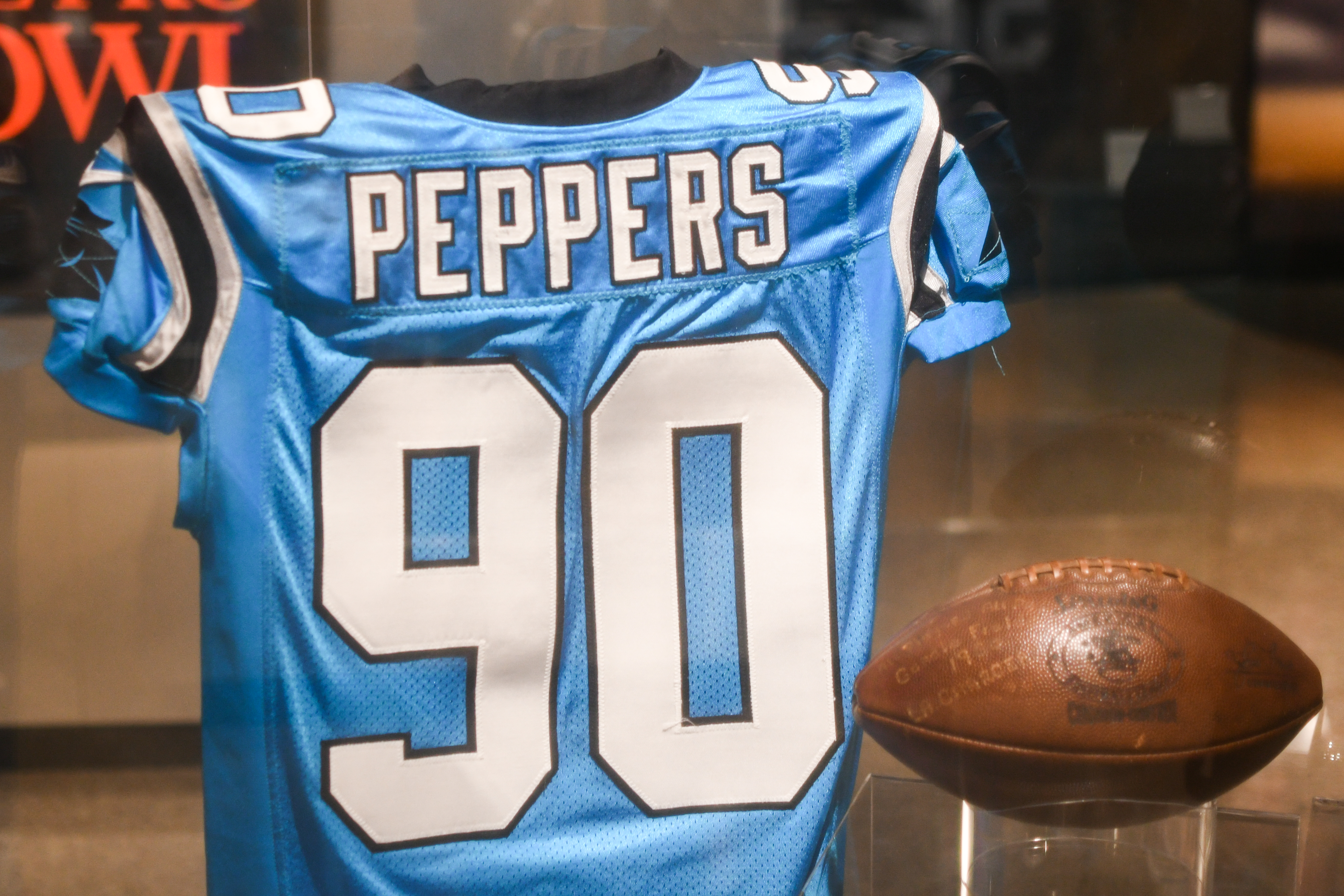
Julius Peppers #90 jersey in the Pro Football Hall of Fame. Peppers played defensive end for the Panthers from 2002 to 2009 and later again from 2017 to 2018.

After the NFL's expansion to 32 teams in 2002, the Panthers were relocated from the NFC West to the newly created NFC South division. The Panthers' rivalries with the Falcons and Saints were maintained, and they would be joined by the Tampa Bay Buccaneers. The Panthers had the second overall pick in the 2002 NFL draft. The team selected future Hall of Fame defensive end Julius Peppers out of North Carolina. New York Giants defensive coordinator John Fox was hired to replace Seifert and led the team to a 7–9 finish in 2002. Although the team's defense gave up very few yards, ranking the second-best in the NFL in yards conceded, they were hindered by an offense that ranked as the second-worst in the league in yards gained.

Prior to the 2003 season, the team signed quarterback Jake Delhomme. The Panthers improved to 11–5 in the 2003 regular season, winning the NFC South. The Panthers defeated the Dallas Cowboys 29–10 in the Wild Card Round, the St. Louis Rams 29–23 in the Divisional Round, and the Philadelphia Eagles 14–3 in the NFC Championship. They advanced to Super Bowl XXXVIII before losing to the New England Patriots, 32–29. The game was immediately hailed by sportswriter Peter King as the "Greatest Super Bowl of all time". King felt the game "was a wonderful championship battle, full of everything that makes football dramatic, draining, enervating, maddening, fantastic, exciting" and praised, among other things, the unpredictability, coaching, and conclusion. The game is still viewed as one of the best Super Bowls of all time, and in the opinion of Charlotte-based NPR reporter Scott Jagow, the Panthers' Super Bowl appearance represented the arrival of Charlotte onto the national scene.

Following a 1–7 start in 2004, the Panthers rebounded to win six of their last seven games despite losing 14 players for the season due to injury. They lost their last game to New Orleans, finishing the 2004 season at 7–9. Had they won the game, the Panthers would have made the playoffs. The team improved to 11–5 in 2005, finishing second in the division behind Tampa Bay and clinching a playoff berth as a wild card. In the first round of the playoffs, the Panthers went on the road to face the New York Giants, beating them 23–0 for the NFL's first playoff shutout against a home team since 1980. The following week, they beat Chicago 29–21 on the road, but lost key players Julius Peppers, a defensive end, and DeShaun Foster, a running back, who were both injured during the game. The Panthers were then defeated 34–14 by the Seattle Seahawks in the NFC Championship Game, ending their season. Although the Panthers went into the 2006 season as favorites to win the NFC South and the free agent signing of Keyshawn Johnson, they finished with a disappointing 8–8 record. The team finished the 2007 season with a 7–9 record after losing quarterback Jake Delhomme early in the season due to an elbow injury.

In 2008, the Panthers rebounded with a 12–4 regular season record, winning the NFC South and securing a first round bye. They were eliminated in the divisional round of the playoffs, losing 33–13 to the eventual NFC Champion Arizona Cardinals after Delhomme turned the ball over six times. Delhomme's struggles carried over into the 2009 season, where he threw 18 interceptions in the first 11 games before breaking a finger in his throwing hand. The Panthers were at a 4–7 record before Delhomme's season-ending injury, and his backup, Matt Moore, led the team to a 4–1 finish to the season for an 8–8 overall record. In 2010, after releasing Delhomme in the offseason, the Panthers finished with a league-worst (2–14) record; their offense was the worst in the league. John Fox's contract expired after the season ended, and the team did not retain him or his staff.

==== Ron Rivera years (2011–2019) ====
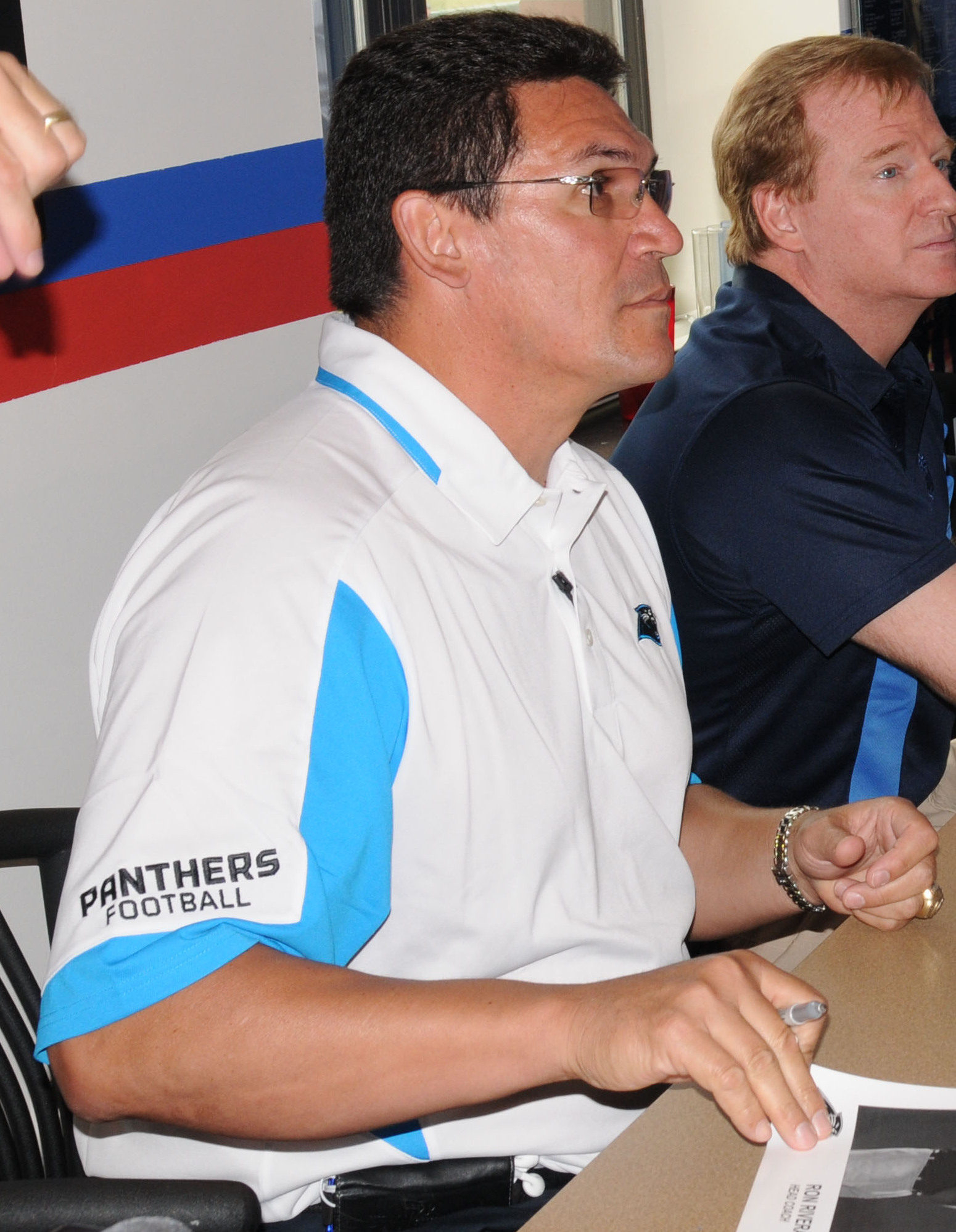
Former coach Ron Rivera in 2011.

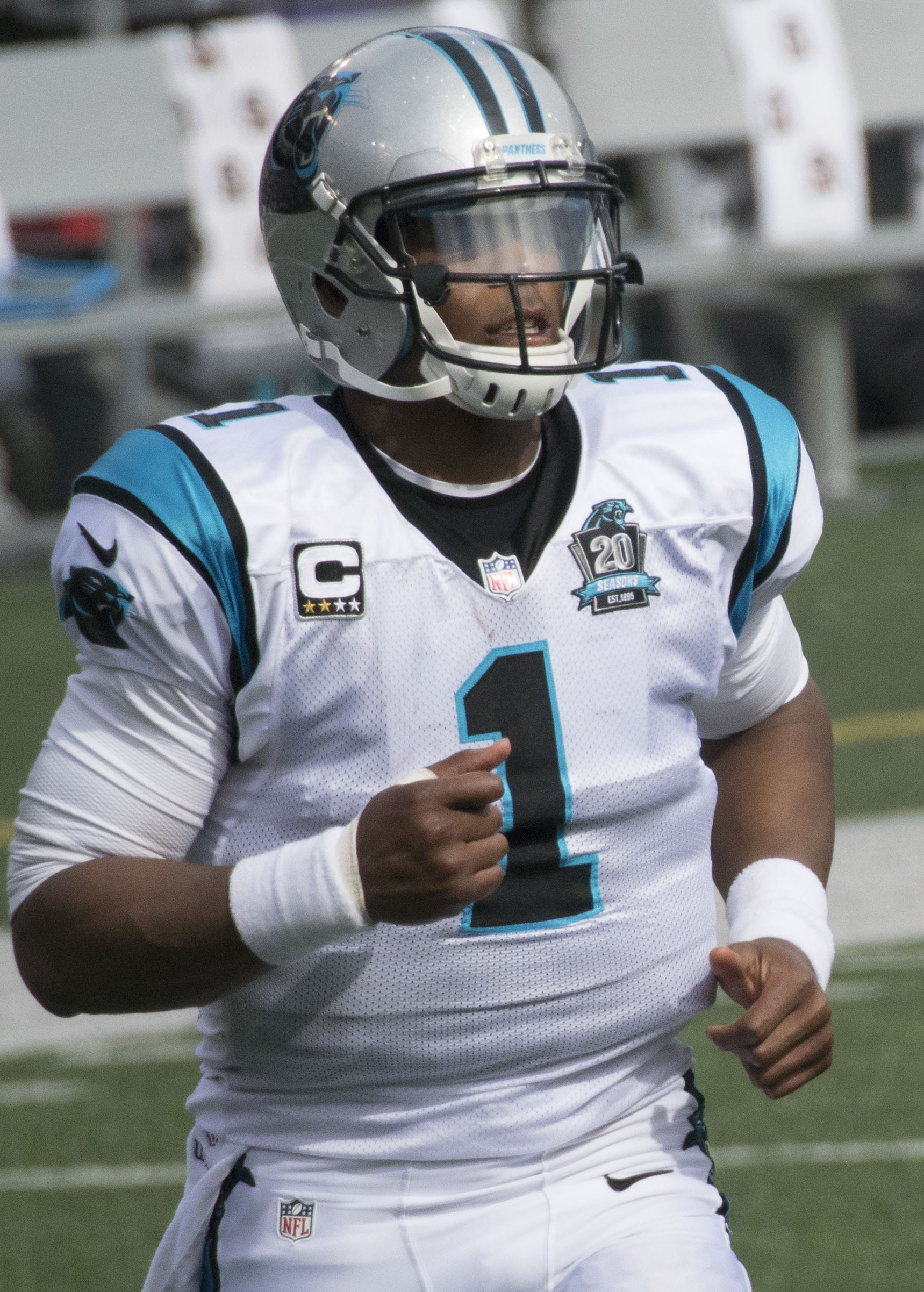
2015 NFL MVP Cam Newton. Newton would lead the Panthers to a 15–1 record in 2015 and an appearance in Super Bowl 50.

The team hired Ron Rivera to replace Fox as head coach and drafted Auburn's Heisman Trophy-winning quarterback Cam Newton with the first overall pick in the 2011 NFL draft. The Panthers opened the 2011 season 2–6, but finished with a 6–10 record, and Newton was awarded the AP Offensive Rookie of the Year award after setting the NFL record for most rushing touchdowns from a quarterback (14) in a single season and becoming the first rookie NFL quarterback to throw for over 4,000 yards in a single season, thus setting the NFL rookie record. He also was the first rookie quarterback to rush for over 500 yards in a single season. After strengthening the defense with future all-pro Luke Kuechly in the first round of the 2012 draft, the Panthers again opened the 2012 season poorly, losing five out of their first six games, leading longtime general manager Marty Hurney to be fired in response. The team slid to a 2–8 record before winning five of their last six games, resulting in a 7–9 record. This strong finish helped save Rivera's job.

The Panthers had a winning season the following year, finishing with a 12–4 record and winning their third NFC South title and another playoff bye, but they were beaten by the 49ers in the Divisional Round. In 2014, the Panthers opened the season with two wins, but after 12 games, sat at 3–8–1 due in part to a seven-game winless streak. A four-game winning streak to end the season secured the team their second consecutive NFC South championship and a playoff berth, despite a losing record of 7–8–1. The Panthers defeated the Arizona Cardinals, 27–16, in the wild card round to advance to the divisional playoffs, where they lost to eventual NFC champion Seattle, 31–17.

The 2015 season saw the Panthers start the season 14–0 and finish the season 15–1, which tied for the best regular-season record in NFC history. The team had the league's top-scoring offense. During the same season, Cam Newton was named NFL MVP. The Panthers also secured their third consecutive NFC South championship, as well as their first overall top-seeded playoff berth. In the 2015–16 playoffs, the Panthers defeated the Seattle Seahawks in the NFC Divisional playoffs, 31–24, after shutting them out in the first half, 31–0, and the Arizona Cardinals, 49–15, in the NFC Championship Game to advance to Super Bowl 50, their first Super Bowl appearance since the 2003 season. The Panthers lost a defensive struggle to the AFC champion Denver Broncos, 24–10. In the 2016 season, the Panthers regressed on their 15–1 record from 2015, posting a 6–10 record and a last-place finish in the NFC South, missing the playoffs for the first time since 2012, and losing the division title to the second-seeded Falcons, who went on to represent the NFC in Super Bowl LI. In 2017, the Panthers finished with an 11–5 record and a #5 seed. However, they lost to the New Orleans Saints 31–26 in the Wild Card Round, their first loss in that round in franchise history. During the 2017 season, Richardson announced that he would sell the franchise amid an NFL investigation into workplace misconduct allegations.

=== David Tepper era (2018–present) ===
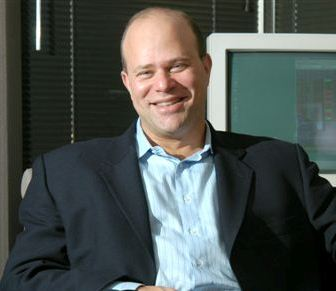
Businessman David Tepper purchased the Panthers in 2018.

On May 16, 2018, David Tepper, formerly a minority owner of the Pittsburgh Steelers, finalized an agreement to purchase the Panthers. The sale price was nearly $2.3 billion, a record. The agreement was approved by the league owners on May 22, 2018. The sale officially closed on July 9, 2018. After starting 6–2, the Panthers finished the 2018 season 7–9. They began the 2019 season 5–3 but lost the last eight games to finish 5–11; late in the season, Tepper fired Rivera as head coach. Perry Fewell finished the season as interim coach, going 0–4. The 2019 season was marred with a season-ending injury to Cam Newton, who only played in two games that year. The Panthers turned to Kyle Allen and Will Grier at quarterback after Newton was out.

==== Matt Rhule years (2020–2022) ====
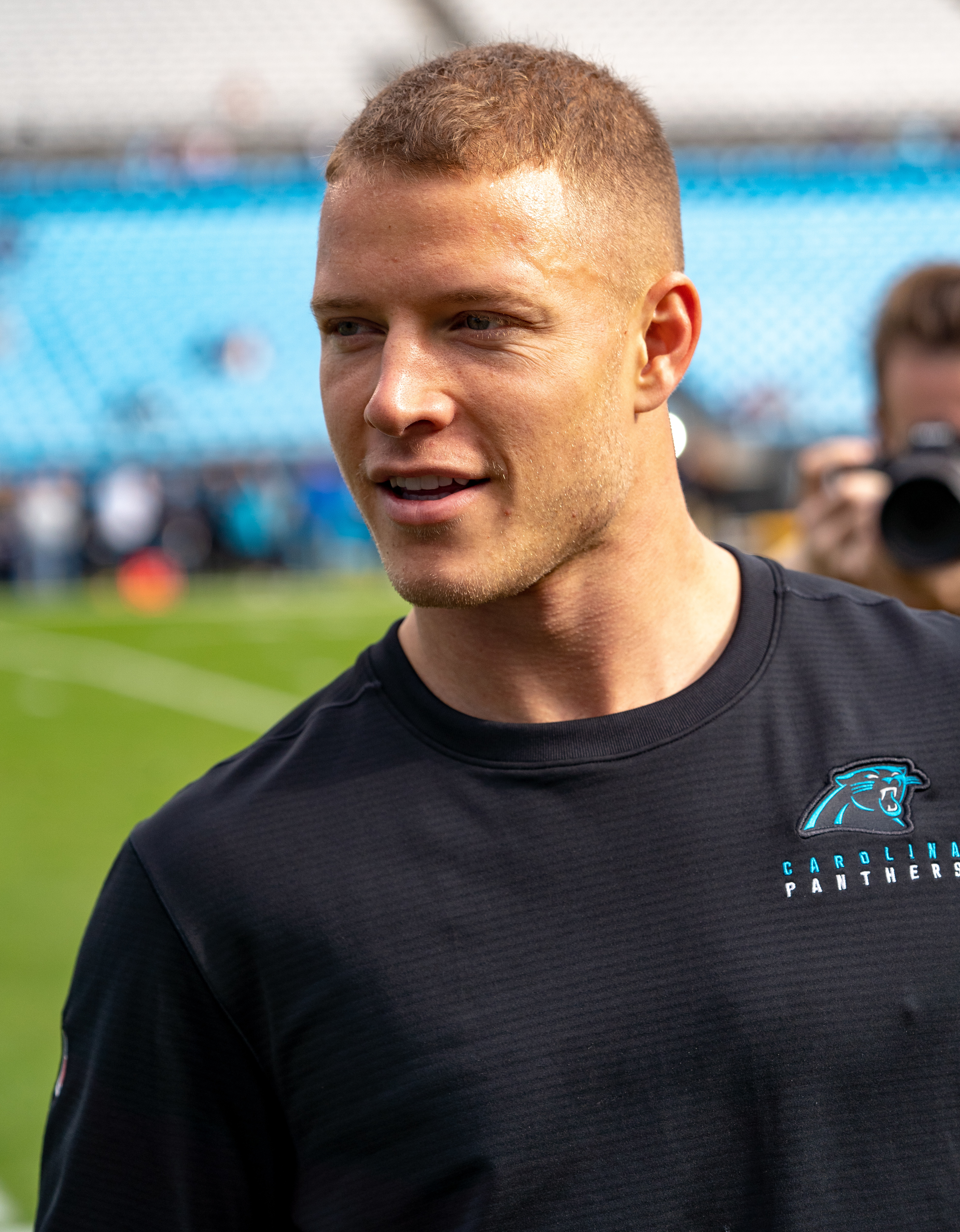
Former Panthers running back Christian McCaffrey played for the team from 2017 to 2022. In 2019, McCaffrey became just the third running back in NFL history to have 1,000 rushing and receiving yards in the same season.

On January 7, 2020, the Panthers hired Baylor head coach Matt Rhule as head coach. On January 15, 2020, Luke Kuechly announced his retirement from the league. On March 17, 2020, the Panthers signed Teddy Bridgewater to a three-year $63 million contract. On March 24, the Carolina Panthers released their 2011 first overall pick and 2015 MVP quarterback Cam Newton. The Panthers had a difficult 2020 season, losing several close games. They would finish 5–11 for the second straight year.

Following the season, the Panthers traded for Sam Darnold from the New York Jets and shipped Bridgewater to the Denver Broncos. On November 11, 2021, the Panthers signed Cam Newton to a one-year deal after Darnold was put on injured reserve. However, the Panthers' struggles continued; despite winning their first three games of the 2021 season, they finished 5–12 and ended the season on a seven-game losing streak.

After the Panthers began the season with a 1–4 record, Rhule was fired as head coach on October 10, 2022, finishing his tenure with an 11–27 record in two and a half seasons. Steve Wilks was named interim head coach as a result. The Panthers then initiated a rebuild, trading players such as Robbie Anderson and Christian McCaffrey. Steve Wilks would go 6–6 as the interim head coach, as the Panthers would finish the season with a 7–10 record.

==== Frank Reich year (2023) ====
On January 26, 2023, former Indianapolis Colts head coach Frank Reich was hired as head coach. Reich was the first starting QB in Panthers history in 1995. Prior to the draft, the Panthers traded with the Chicago Bears to move up to the first overall pick. The trade involved Carolina swapping spots with the Bears and giving up their 2023 second-round pick, 2024 first-round pick, 2025 second-round pick, and wide receiver D. J. Moore. In the 2023 NFL draft, Reich's first and only as the Panthers head coach, the Panthers selected their potential franchise quarterback in Heisman Trophy winner Bryce Young out of Alabama with the first overall pick.

On November 27, 2023, Reich was fired after a 1–10 start. Special teams coordinator Chris Tabor coached the remainder of the 2023 season, going 1–5 in those games as the Panthers finished with a league-worst 2–15 record.

==== Dave Canales (2024–present) ====
On January 25, 2024, former Tampa Bay Buccaneers offensive coordinator Dave Canales was hired as head coach. In the first regular season game of the season, the Panthers lost to the New Orleans saints with a score of 10–47 with Bryce Young registering 13 completions from 30 attempts and being intercepted twice. The Panthers finished with a 5–12 record and 3rd in the NFC South in the 2024 season. In 2025, the Panthers won the NFC South for the first time since 2015 with an 8–9 record, earning their first playoff appearance since 2017. They lost 34–31 to the Los Angeles Rams in the Wild Card Round after defeating the Rams 31–28 in Week 13 of the regular season.

== Logo and uniforms ==
=== Logo ===
The shape of the Panthers logo was designed to mimic the outline of both North Carolina and South Carolina. The Panthers changed their logo and logotype in 2012, the first such change in team history. According to the team, the changes were designed to give their logo an "aggressive, contemporary look" as well as to give it a more three-dimensional feel. The primary tweaks were made in the eye and mouth, where the features, particularly the muscular brow and fangs, are more pronounced, creating a more menacing look. The revised logo has a darker shade of blue over the black logo, compared to the old design, which had a shade similar to teal on top of black.

Carolina Panthers wordmark types

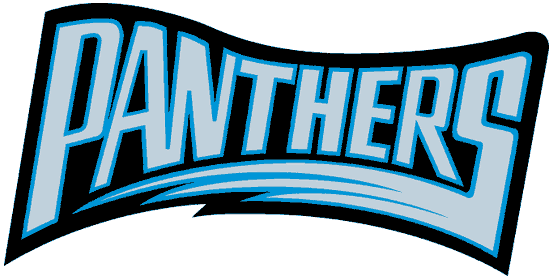
The team's first wordmark, used in inaugural 1995 season

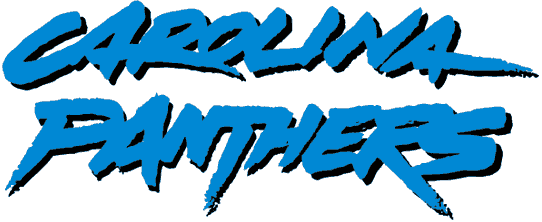
The team's second wordmark, (1996–2011)

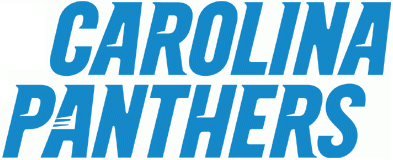
The team's third wordmark, (2012–present)

=== Uniforms ===
By the time they had been announced as the 29th NFL team in October 1993, the Panthers' logo and helmet design had already been finalized, but the uniform design was still under creation. After discussion, the Panthers organization decided on jerseys colored white, black, and blue and pants colored white and silver. The exact tone of blue, which they decided would be "process blue" (a shade lighter than Duke's and darker than North Carolina's), was the most difficult color to choose.

The team's uniform has remained largely the same since its creation, with only minor alterations, such as changing the sock color of the team's black uniforms from blue to black and changing the team's shoes from white to black. Richardson, a self-described traditionalist, said that no major uniform changes would be made in his lifetime.

The Panthers have three main jersey colors: black, white, and blue. Their blue jerseys, designated their alternate uniforms, are the newest and were introduced in 2002. NFL regulations allow the team to use the blue jersey up to two times in any given season. In all other games, the team must wear either their white or black jerseys; in NFL games, the home team decides whether to wear a dark or white jersey, while the away team wears the opposite. Usually the Panthers opt for white or blue when the weather is expected to be hot and for black when the weather is expected to be cold.

The Panthers typically pair their white jerseys with white pants and blue socks, while the black and blue jerseys are paired with silver pants and black socks; there have only been a few exceptions to these combinations.

The first such instance was in 1998 when the team paired their white jerseys with silver pants in a game against the Indianapolis Colts. The second instance was in 2012 during a game against the Denver Broncos when they paired their black jerseys with new black pants; this created an all-black uniform, with the exception of blue socks and silver helmets. The decision to wear blue socks was made by team captain Steve Smith, who felt the blue socks gave the uniforms a more distinct appearance compared with other teams that have all-black uniforms. The all-black uniforms won the "Greatest Uniform in NFL History" contest, a fan-voted contest run by NFL.com in July 2013. In July 2013, the team's equipment manager, Jackie Miles, said the Panthers intended to use the all-black uniform more in the future. The Panthers wore the all-black uniform three times the following season, once each in the preseason and regular season, and the third time during the home divisional round playoff game vs the 49ers. During the Panthers' 2015 Thanksgiving Day game against the Dallas Cowboys, they debuted an all-blue uniform as part of Nike's "Color Rush" series. Since 2018, however, the Panthers have frequently mixed and matched their uniforms; during the 2024 season alone, the team wore 14 different combinations on the field.

The team's uniform did not change significantly after Nike became the NFL's jersey supplier in 2012, but the collar was altered to honor former Panthers player and coach Sam Mills by featuring the phrase "Keep Pounding". Nike had conceived the idea, and the team supported the concept as a way to expose newer fans to the legacy of Mills, who died of cancer in 2005. Mills had introduced the phrase, which has since become a team slogan, in a speech that he gave to the players and coaches prior to their 2003 playoff game against Dallas; in the speech, Mills compared his fight against cancer with the team's on-field battle, saying "When I found out I had cancer, there were two things I could do – quit or keep pounding. I'm a fighter. I kept pounding. You're fighters, too. Keep pounding!"

In 2019, the Panthers unveiled new uniforms. The new uniforms are Nike's "Vapor Untouchable" and have only minor differences: the tapered strips on the pants are replaced by stripes that extend down to the socks, the reflective shoulder cloth was replaced and the hip logos were also removed. The uniforms keep the same basic look, colors, and numbers as the originals.

In 2022, after the NFL reinstated the use of alternate helmets, the Panthers unveiled secondary black helmets, which featured no white elements on the team logo.

== Stadium and practice facilities ==
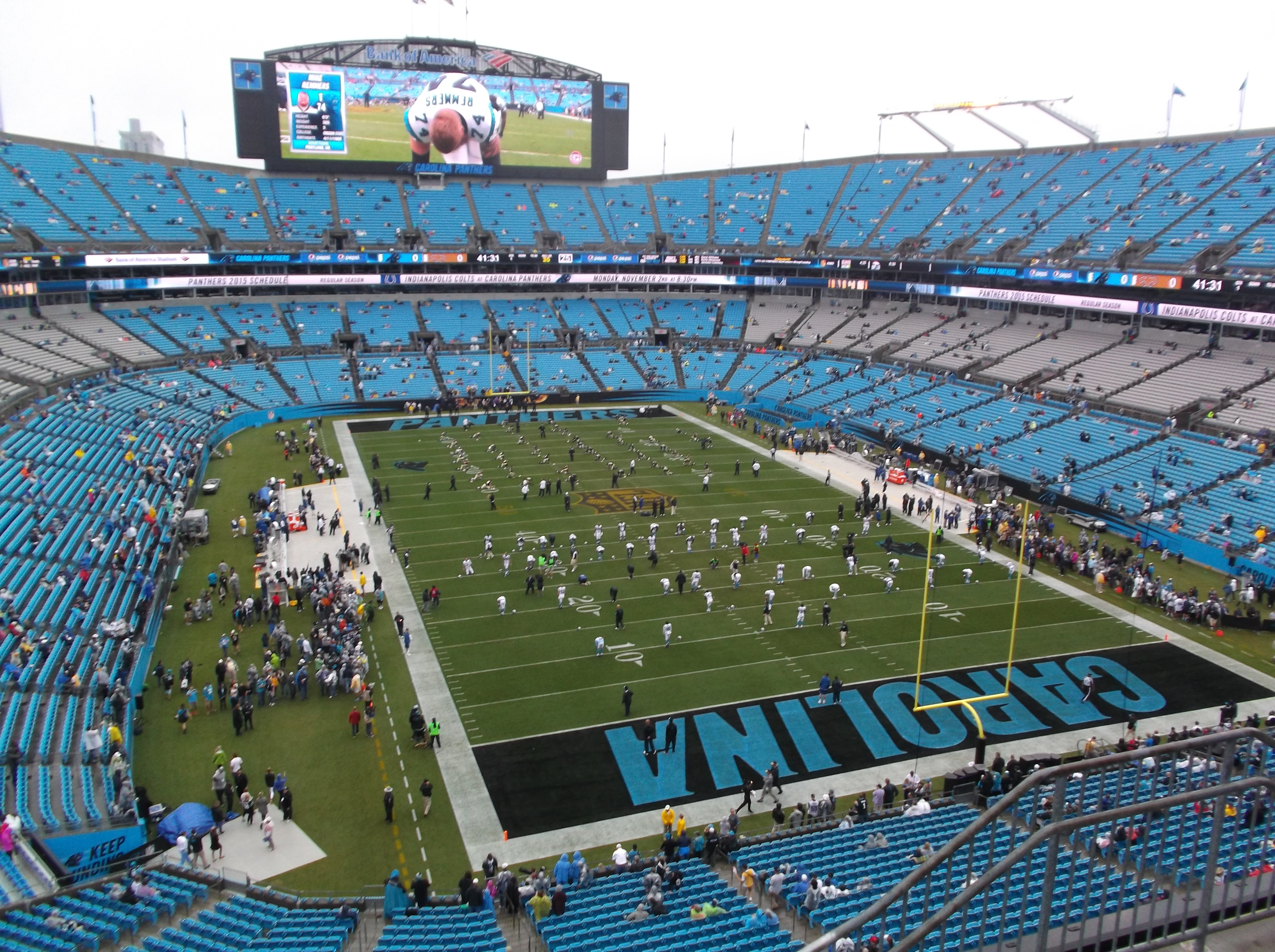
Inside Bank of America Stadium in 2015

The Panthers played their first season at Memorial Stadium in Clemson, South Carolina, as their facility in uptown Charlotte was still under construction. Ericsson Stadium, called Bank of America Stadium since 2004, opened in the summer of 1996. The stadium was specially designed by HOK Sports Facilities Group for football and is the headquarters and administrative offices of the Panthers. On some days, the stadium offers public tours for a fee. Private tours for groups are offered for a fee seven days a week, though there are some exceptions, and such tours must be arranged in advance.

Two bronze panther statues flank each of the stadium's three main entrances; they are the largest sculptures ever commissioned in the United States. The names of the team's original PSL owners are engraved on the base of each statue. The first two people in the Panthers Hall of Honor, team executive Mike McCormack and linebacker Sam Mills, are honored with life-sized bronze statues outside the stadium. Mills, in addition to being the only player in the Hall of Honor for over 20 years, is the only player to have had his jersey number (#51) retired by the Panthers as of 2016.

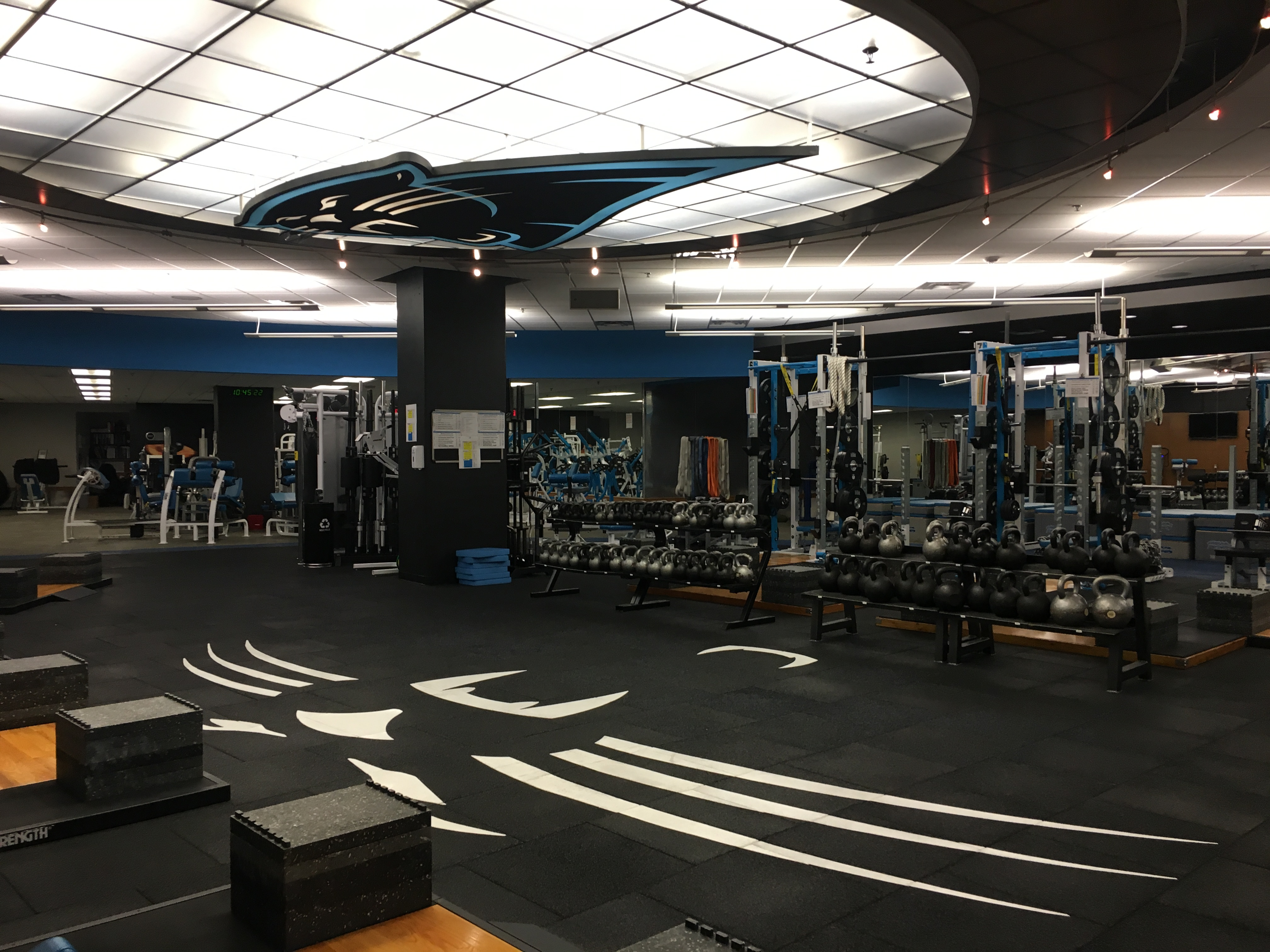
The team's weight room inside of Bank of America Stadium

The Panthers have three open-air fields next to Bank of America Stadium where they currently hold their practices; during the 1995 season, when the team played their home games in South Carolina, the team held their practices at Winthrop University in Rock Hill, South Carolina. Because the practice fields, along with the stadium, are located in uptown Charlotte, the fields are directly visible from skyscrapers as well as from a four-story condominium located across the street. According to Mike Cranston, a running joke said that the Panthers' division rivals had pooled their resources to purchase a room on the building's top floor and that a fire at the condominium was caused by the Panthers organization. In order to prevent people from seeing inside the field while the team is practicing, the team has added "strategically planted trees and a tarp over the ... fence surrounding the fields". Additionally, they employ a security team to watch for and chase away any people who stop alongside the fence surrounding the field. In the event of bad weather, the team moves their practices to an indoor sports facility about 10 miles (16 km) from the stadium. The team does not own this facility. The Panthers hosted their annual training camp at Wofford College in Spartanburg, South Carolina, from 1995 until 2024, when they moved training camp to Charlotte.

In June 2026, the Carolina Panthers launched an $800 million renovation project for their home stadium, aimed at modernizing the venue and enhancing the fan experience.

=== Team headquarters ===
The Panthers were planning on building a $1 billion team headquarters and training facility on a 240-acre (0.97 km^{2}) in Rock Hill, South Carolina, nicknamed "The Rock". After six months of discussions and state approval of $115 million in incentives, the formal announcement of the team's plan for a new practice facility came on June 5, 2019. Rock Hill mayor John Gettys described the project at that time as the biggest in the city's history. Groundbreaking took place in July 2019, and it was expected to be completed by summer 2023. The Panthers announced on April 19, 2022, that the project-related agreements with the City of Rock Hill had been terminated. On June 1, 2022, GT Real Estate Holdings, LLC, a real estate company owned by David Tepper, filed for Chapter 11 bankruptcy protection in Delaware.

== Culture ==
The Panthers are supported in both North Carolina and South Carolina. South Carolina Governor Nikki Haley declared July 30, 2012, "Carolina Panthers Day" in her state, saying that "when it comes to professional teams, the Carolina Panthers are the team that South Carolina calls their own". During the 2015 NFC Championship and Super Bowl, the hashtag #OneCarolina was used by college and professional sports teams from North Carolina and South Carolina to show unified support for the Panthers.

Sports Illustrated graded the Panthers as having the 10th highest "NFL Fan Value Experience" in 2007, attributing much of the fan atmosphere to the team's newness when compared to the established basketball fanbase. They also observed that the stadium has scattered parking lots, each of which has a different tailgating style. Some have fried chicken, pork, or Carolina-style barbecue, while others have live bands and televisions. Pickup football games in the parking lots are common. The Carolina Panthers have a home stadium capacity of just under 75,000, with home attendance ranking in the NFL's top ten since 2006.

=== Mascot, cheerleaders, and drumline ===
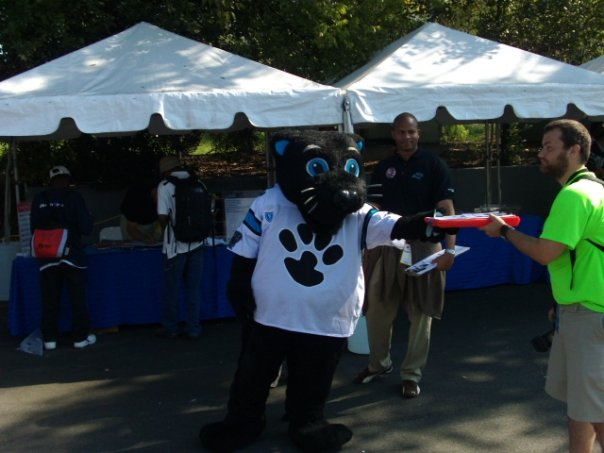
Panthers mascot Sir Purr, wearing a white jersey

Sir Purr, an anthropomorphic black panther who wears a jersey numbered '00', has been the Panthers' mascot since their first season. During games, Sir Purr provides sideline entertainment through skits and "silly antics". The mascot participates in a number of community events year-round, including a monthly visit to the patients at Levine Children's Hospital. Sir Purr also hosts the annual Mascot Bowl, an event which pits pro and college mascots against each other during halftime at a selected Panthers home game.

The team's cheerleaders are the Carolina Topcats who lead cheers and entertain fans at home games. The TopCats participate in both corporate and charity events. In March 2022, the Carolina Topcats became the first NFL cheerleading team to have a transgender member, Justine Lindsay. The team's drumline is PurrCussion, an ensemble of snare, tenor, and bass drummers as well as cymbal players. PurrCussion performs for fans outside the stadium and introduces players prior to home games; it consists of drummers from across the Carolinas.

=== Keep Pounding Drum ===
Starting with the 2012 season, the Panthers introduced the Keep Pounding Drum, inspired by the aforementioned motivational speech by Sam Mills before the team's 2004 playoff game against the Cowboys. Prior to each home game, an honorary drummer hits the six-foot-tall drum four times to signify the four quarters of an American football game. According to the team, the drummers "come from a variety of backgrounds and occupations, but all have overcome a great trial or adversity that has not only made them strong but also pushes them to make others around them stronger". Drummers have included current and former Panthers players, military veterans, Make-A-Wish children, and athletes from other sports, including NBA MVP and Charlotte native Stephen Curry, US women's national soccer team players Whitney Engen and Heather O'Reilly, 7 time NASCAR Cup Series champion Jimmie Johnson, and NFL MVP and former Panther Cam Newton.

=== Songs and traditions ===
During the inaugural season of the Panthers, the team had an official fight song, which the team played before each home game. The song, "Stand and Cheer", remains the team's official fight song, but the team does not typically play it before home games. Due to negative fan reaction "Stand and Cheer" was pulled in 1999. Since 2006, the song has returned. The team plays Neil Diamond's "Sweet Caroline" after home victories. A "keep pounding" chant was introduced during the 2012 season which starts before the opening kickoff of each home game. As prompted by the video boards, one side of the stadium shouts "keep" and the other side replies with "pounding". The chant is similar to ones that take place at college football games.

=== Charity and community work ===
The Carolina Panthers support a variety of non-profits in North and South Carolina through the Carolina Panthers Charities. Four annual scholarships are awarded to student athletes through the Carolina Panthers Graduate Scholarship and the Carolina Panthers Players Sam Mills Memorial Scholarship programs. Carolina Panthers Charities also offers grants to non-profits that support education, athletics, and human services in the community. The Panthers and Fisher Athletic have provided six equipment grants to high school football teams in the Carolinas each year since 2010. Carolina Panthers Charities raises funds at three annual benefits: the Countdown to Kickoff Luncheon, the team's first public event each season; Football 101, an educational workshop for fans; and the Weekend Warrior Flag Football Tournament, a two-day non-contact flag football tournament. Another annual benefit is Taste of the Panthers, a gourmet food tasting which raises funds for Second Harvest Food Bank of Metrolina.

In 2003, the Panthers and Carolinas HealthCare Foundation established the Keep Pounding Fund, a fundraising initiative to support cancer research and patient support programs. The Panthers community has raised more than $1.4 million for the fund through direct donations, charity auctions, blood drives, and an annual 5k stadium run. The Panthers and Levine Children's Hospital coordinate monthly hospital visits and VIP game-day experiences for terminally ill or hospitalized children.

In addition to these team-specific efforts, the Panthers participate in a number of regular initiatives promoted by the NFL and USA Football, the league's youth football development partner. These include USA Football Month, held throughout August to encourage and promote youth football; A Crucial Catch, the league's Breast Cancer Awareness Month program; Salute to Service, held throughout November to support military families and personnel; and PLAY 60, which encourages young NFL fans to be active for at least 60 minutes each day.

=== Radio and television ===
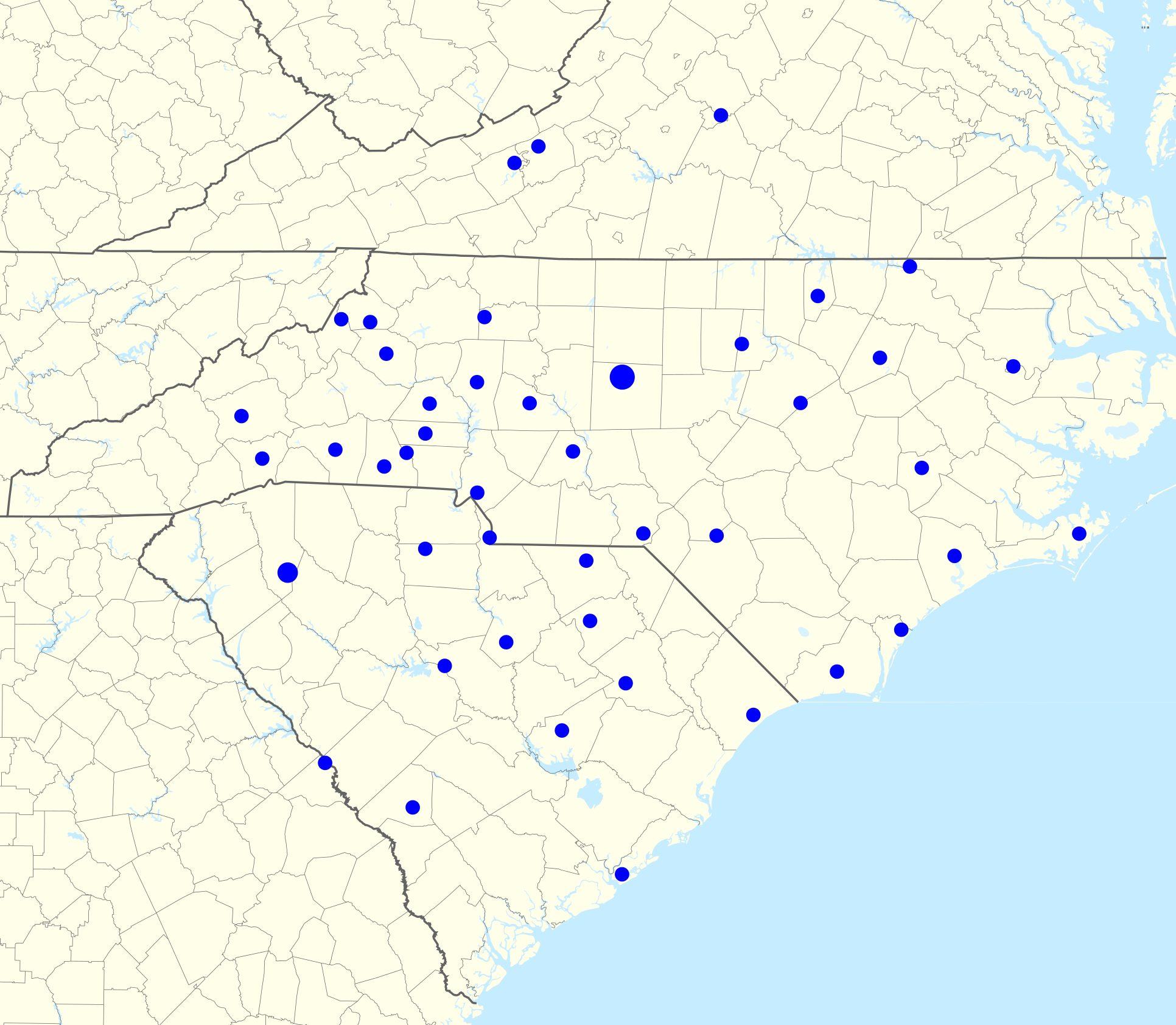
Map shows the radio affiliates of the Carolina Panthers that broadcast game-day-related coverage across the Carolinas and Virginia.

Radio coverage is provided by flagship station WRFX and through the Carolina Panthers Radio Network, with affiliates throughout the Carolinas and Virginia. The Panthers' radio broadcasting team is led by play-by-play voice Anish Shroff, with Jake Delhomme as color analyst, and WBT sports director Jim Szoke as studio host. The radio network broadcasts pre-game coverage, games with commentary, and post-game wrap-ups. It also live-broadcasts Panther Talk, a weekly event at Bank of America Stadium which offers fans a chance to meet a player and ask questions of the staff.

National broadcasting and cable television networks cover regular-season games, as well as some preseason games. Locally, Fox affiliate WJZY airs most regular-season games, while home games against an AFC team typically air on CBS affiliate WBTV. Any appearances on Monday Night Football are simulcast on ABC affiliate WSOC-TV, while any appearances on Thursday Night Football are simulcast on WSOC. Sunday night and some Thursday night games are aired on NBC affiliate WCNC-TV.

All preseason games and team specials are televised by the Carolina Panthers Television Network on flagship station WSOC-TV in Charlotte and fourteen affiliate stations throughout the Carolinas, Georgia, Virginia, and Tennessee. WSOC took over as the Panthers' television partner for the 2019 season, replacing longtime television partner WCCB, which had retained this role after losing the Fox affiliation to WJZY in 2013. As of 2021, the preseason television broadcasting team consists of play-by-play commentator Taylor Zarzour, color analyst and former Panthers player Steve Smith, and sideline reporter Kristen Balboni. The network also hosts The Panthers Huddle, a weekly show focusing on the Panthers' upcoming opponent.

The Panthers also offer game broadcasts in Spanish throughout both Carolinas and Mexico, with Jaime Moreno and Toño Ramos providing commentary.

== Rivalries ==
=== Division ===
The Panthers have developed heated rivalries with the three fellow members of the NFC South (the Atlanta Falcons, Tampa Bay Buccaneers, and New Orleans Saints). The team's fiercest rivals are the Falcons and Buccaneers.

==== Atlanta Falcons ====
The Falcons are a natural geographic rival for the Panthers, as Atlanta is only 230 miles (370 km) south on I-85. The two teams have played each other twice a year since the Panthers' inception, and games between the two teams feature large numbers of the visiting team's fans. As of the 2025 season, the Falcons lead the all-time series 37–25. The teams have never met in the postseason.

==== Tampa Bay Buccaneers ====
The Panthers' rivalry with Tampa Bay has been described as the most intense in the NFC South. The rivalry originated in 2002 with the formation of the NFC South, but became particularly heated before the 2003 season with verbal bouts between players on the two teams. It escalated further when the Panthers went to Tampa Bay and beat them in what ESPN.com writer Pat Yasinskas described as "one of the most physical contests in recent memory". The rivalry has resulted in a number of severe injuries for players on both teams, some of which were caused by foul play. One of these plays, an illegal hit on Tampa Bay punt returner Clifton Smith, sparked a brief melee between the teams in 2009. As of the 2025 season, the Panthers lead the all-time series 26–25. The two teams have never met in the postseason.

==== New Orleans Saints ====
The Panthers also have a lesser rivalry with the New Orleans Saints. As of the 2025 season, the Saints lead the regular-season series 33–29 and the overall series 34–29. New Orleans won the teams' only postseason meeting, 31–26, in the Wild Card Round of the 2017–18 playoffs.

== Current staff ==
Carolina Panthers staff
Front office: Owner – David Tepper; President – Kristi Coleman; President of football operations/general manager – Dan Morgan; Executive vice president of football operations – Brandt Tilis; Vice president of football analytics – Eric Eager; Vice president of player development – Brian Decker; Director of pro scouting – Lee McNeill; Director of player personnel – Jared Kirksey; Assistant director of college scouting – Dave Whittington; Director of data science – Benjamin Brown; Director of football administration – Justin Davidov; Head coaches: Head coach – Dave Canales; Assistant head coach/run game coordinator – Harold Goodwin; Associate head coach/offensive specialist – Darrell Bevell; Offensive coaches: Offensive coordinator – Brad Idzik; Pass game coordinator – Mike Bercovici; Quarterbacks – Will Harriger; Running backs – Bernie Parmalee; Wide receivers – Rob Moore; Tight ends – Pat McPherson; Offensive line – Joe Gilbert; Offensive assistant – Keyshawn Colmon; Offensive assistant – Dean Petzing; Senior offensive consultant - Carl Smith	Defensive coaches: Interim defensive coordinator – Todd Wash; Assistant defensive coordinator/linebackers – Peter Hansen; Defensive line/outside linebackers – A.C. Carter; Assistant linebackers coach – Mayur Chaudhari; Secondary – Renaldo Hill; Defensive assistant – Ilir Emini; Defensive assistant – Kevin Peterson; Special teams coaches: Special teams coordinator – Tracy Smith; Assistant special teams coordinator – Daren Bates; Special teams/defensive assistant – Dwayne Stukes; Support staff: Head coach assistant and coaching operations manager – Jessica Beckenstein; Director of coaching development – Scott Cooper; Game management coordinator – George Li; Strength and conditioning: Strength and conditioning – Jeremy Scott; Strength and conditioning assistant/return to play coordinator – Thomas Barbeau; Human performance assistant – Timothy Rabas; → Coaching staff → Front office → More NFL staffs

== Players ==
=== Current roster ===
Carolina Panthers roster
Quarterbacks (QB): 16 Haynes King; 12 Kenny Pickett; 9 Bryce Young; Running backs (RB): 28 A. J. Dillon; 23 Trevor Etienne; 30 Chuba Hubbard; 34 Anthony Tyus III; Wide receivers (WR): 18 Jalen Coker; 4 Tetairoa McMillan; 13 John Metchie III RS; 83 David Moore; 87 Brycen Tremayne; Tight ends (TE): 84 Mitchell Evans; 81 Feleipe Franks; 0 Ja'Tavion Sanders; 82 Tommy Tremble; 88 Darren Waller	Offensive linemen (OL): 67 Corey Bullock G; 73 Stone Forsythe T; 77 Luke Fortner C; 57 Monroe Freeling T; 75 Sam Hecht C; 50 Robert Hunt G; 68 Damien Lewis G; 65 Torricelli Simpkins III G; 63 Rasheed Walker T; Defensive linemen (DL): 97 Bobby Brown III DT; 95 Derrick Brown DT; 93 TeRah Edwards DT; 94 Aaron Hall DT; 92 Lee Hunter DT; 98 Tershawn Wharton DT	Linebackers (LB): 33 Tyrel Dodson MLB; 52 Trevis Gipson OLB; 39 Nick Hampton OLB; 91 Patrick Jones II OLB; 46 Jackson Kuwatch MLB; 55 Devin Lloyd MLB; 54 Bam Martin-Scott MLB; 58 Bobby Okereke MLB; 5 Jaelan Phillips OLB; 3 Princely Umanmielen OLB; Defensive backs (DB): 36 Malcolm DeWalt CB; 24 Will Lee III CB; 7 Tre'von Moehrig S; 22 Lathan Ransom S; 21 Nick Scott S; 27 Isaiah Simmons S; 26 Chau Smith-Wade CB; 20 Zakee Wheatley S; Special teams (ST): 10 Ryan Fitzgerald K; 44 J. J. Jansen LS; 6 Sam Martin P	Practice squad: 41 Caelen Carson CB; 78 Saahdiq Charles G; 32 Zion Childress CB; 96 Keith Cooper DT; 74 Jake Curhan T; 49 Mohamoud Diabate LB; 37 Ahmani Marshall RB; 42 Mapalo Mwansa LB (IPP); 69 Parker Peterson DT; 86 Ja'seem Reed WR; 43 DeVonta Smith CB; 15 Ihmir Smith-Marsette WR; 31 Corey Thornton CB; 85 Casey Washington WR; 47 Ja'Markis Weston LB; 35 Marco Wilson CB; Reserve: 19 Chris Brazzell II WR (IR); 25 Jonathon Brooks RB (IR); 70 Brady Christensen G (IR); 79 Ikem Ekwonu T (PUP); 29 Akayleb Evans CB (IR); 8 Jaycee Horn CB (IR); 48 Thomas Incoom OLB (IR); 99 Cam Jackson DT (IR); 2 Mike Jackson CB (IR); 17 Xavier Legette WR (IR); 72 Taylor Moton T (IR); 11 Nic Scourton OLB (IR) 53 active, 15 practice squad (1 IPP), 12 reserve As of November 3, 2026. Rookies in italics.; Roster; Depth chart; Transactions

=== Hall of Honor ===
The Carolina Panthers Hall of Honor was established in 1997 to honor individuals for their contributions to the Carolina Panthers organization.

Carolina Panthers Hall of Honor
No.	Inductee	Position(s)	Tenure	Inducted
—	Mike McCormack	President / GM	1993–1997	September 21, 1997
51	Sam Mills	LB, coach	1995–2004	September 27, 1998
—	PSL owners		since 1995	September 13, 2004
89	Steve Smith Sr.	WR	2001–2013	October 6, 2019
17	Jake Delhomme	QB	2003–2009	October 6, 2019
85	Wesley Walls	TE	1996–2002	October 6, 2019
69	Jordan Gross	OT	2003–2013	October 6, 2019
90	Julius Peppers	DE	2002–2009, 2017–2018	October 29, 2023
87	Muhsin Muhammad	WR	1996–2004, 2008–2009	October 29, 2023

=== Retired numbers ===
The Carolina Panthers have retired one number.

Carolina Panthers retired numbers
Players
No.	Name	Position	Tenure
51	Sam Mills	LB	1995–1997

=== Pro Football Hall of Fame enshrinees ===
Nominees for the Pro Football Hall of Fame, which "honor[s] individuals who have made outstanding contributions to professional football", are determined by a 46-member selection committee. At least 80% of voters must approve the nominee for him to be inducted.

Carolina Panthers Pro Football Hall of Famers
Players
No.	Name	Position	Tenure	Inducted
92	Reggie White	DE	2000	2006
91	Kevin Greene	LB / DE	1996, 1998–1999	2016
51	Sam Mills	LB	1995–1997	2022
90	Julius Peppers	DE / LB	2002–2009, 2017–2018	2024
69	Jared Allen	DE	2015	2025
59	Luke Kuechly	LB	2012–2019	2026
Coaches and Contributors
Bill Polian		GM	1995–1997	2015

== Ownership and administration ==
The franchise is legally registered as Panther Football, LLC.

=== Jerry Richardson ===
Jerry Richardson was the founder and first owner of the Carolina Panthers. Richardson and his family owned about 48% of the team, (Note: Under NFL rules, an NFL owner and his family only need to control 30 percent of a team to be considered the team's controlling owner.) with the remaining 52% owned by a group of 14 limited partners. Richardson and the other investors paid $206 million for the rights to start the team in 1993.

In December 2017, Sports Illustrated reported that at least four former Panthers employees had received confidential settlements related to allegations of workplace misconduct by Richardson, including sexual harassment and the use of a racial slur. Richardson announced that he would sell the team after the 2017 season, and the NFL assumed control of the investigation. In June 2018, the NFL said that an independent investigation led by former U.S. attorney Mary Jo White had found evidence substantiating the allegations; the league fined Richardson $2.75 million.

=== Team president ===
Mike McCormack, a Hall of Fame lineman for the Cleveland Browns and former coach and executive for the Seattle Seahawks, was the Panthers' first team president, presiding in that role from 1994 until his retirement in 1997; McCormack was inducted as the first person in the Carolina Panthers Hall of Honor later that year. Jerry Richardson's son, Mark, was the team's president from 1997 to 2009. His brother Jon, who had been president of Bank of America Stadium, stepped down at the same time. The resignations of Mark and Jon Richardson were unexpected, as it was thought that the two would eventually take over the team from their father. Mark Richardson was replaced by Danny Morrison, who had previously been the athletic director of both Texas Christian University and Wofford College, Richardson's alma mater. Morrison resigned in early 2017. The role was vacant until August 2018, when Tom Glick was hired as team president. He had previously been the COO of Manchester City.

=== David Tepper ===
On May 16, 2018, David Tepper, formerly a minority owner of the Pittsburgh Steelers, finalized an agreement to purchase the Carolina Panthers, for nearly $2.3 billion, a record at the time. The agreement was approved by the league owners on May 22, 2018. The sale closed on July 9, 2018. According to Forbes, the Panthers are worth approximately $2.3 billion as of 2018. They ranked the Carolina Panthers as the 21st-most valuable NFL team and the 36th-most valuable sports team in the world.

=== Coaches ===
The Panthers have employed ten head coaches, including three in an interim capacity; Dave Canales is the seventh head coach appointed on a non-interim basis. Dom Capers was the head coach from 1995 to 1998 and led the team to one playoff appearance. Counting playoff games, he finished with a record of 31–35 (.470). George Seifert coached the team from 1999 to 2001, recording 16 wins and 32 losses (.333). John Fox, the team's longest-tenured head coach, led the team from 2002 to 2010 and coached the team to three playoff appearances including Super Bowl XXXVIII which the Panthers lost. Including playoff games, Fox ended his tenure with a 78–74 (.513) record, making him the first Panthers coach to finish his tenure with the team with a winning record. Ron Rivera held the position from 2011 to 2019 and led the team to four playoff appearances including Super Bowl 50. Counting playoff games, he finished his Panthers tenure with a record of 79–67–1 (.541). Statistically, Rivera holds the highest winning percentage of any Panthers head coach. On December 3, 2019, following a home loss against the Washington Redskins that sent the team's record to 5–7, Rivera was fired by David Tepper. Perry Fewell, then the defensive backs coach for the team, was named interim head coach the same day. On January 7, 2020, Matt Rhule was hired to be the Panthers head coach. Rhule was fired during his third season, with Steve Wilks taking over on an interim basis. Frank Reich was hired head coach on January 26, 2023. Frank Reich was let go as head coach on November 27, 2023. Dave Canales was hired as head coach on January 25, 2024.

Name	Term	Totals					Regular season					Playoffs				Ref
Name	Term	G	W	L	T	PCT	G	W	L	T	PCT	G	W	L	PCT	Ref
Dom Capers	1995–1998	66	31	35	0	.470	64	30	34	0	.469	2	1	1	.500	
George Seifert	1999–2001	48	16	32	0	.333	48	16	32	0	.333	0	—	—	–	
John Fox	2002–2010	152	78	74	0	.513	144	73	71	0	.507	8	5	3	.625	
Ron Rivera	2011–2019	147	79	67	1	.541	140	76	63	1	.546	7	3	4	.429	
Perry Fewell	2019 (interim)	4	0	4	0	.000	4	0	4	0	.000	0	—	—	–	
Matt Rhule	2020–2022	38	11	27	0	.289	38	11	27	0	.289	0	—	—	–	
Steve Wilks	2022 (interim)	12	6	6	0	.500	12	6	6	0	.500	0	—	—	–	
Frank Reich	2023	11	1	10	0	.091	11	1	10	0	.091	0	—	—	–	
Chris Tabor	2023 (interim)	6	1	5	0	.167	6	1	5	0	.167	0	—	—	–	
Dave Canales	2024–present	35	13	22	0	.371	34	13	21	0	.382	1	0	1	.000	

== Season-by-season results ==
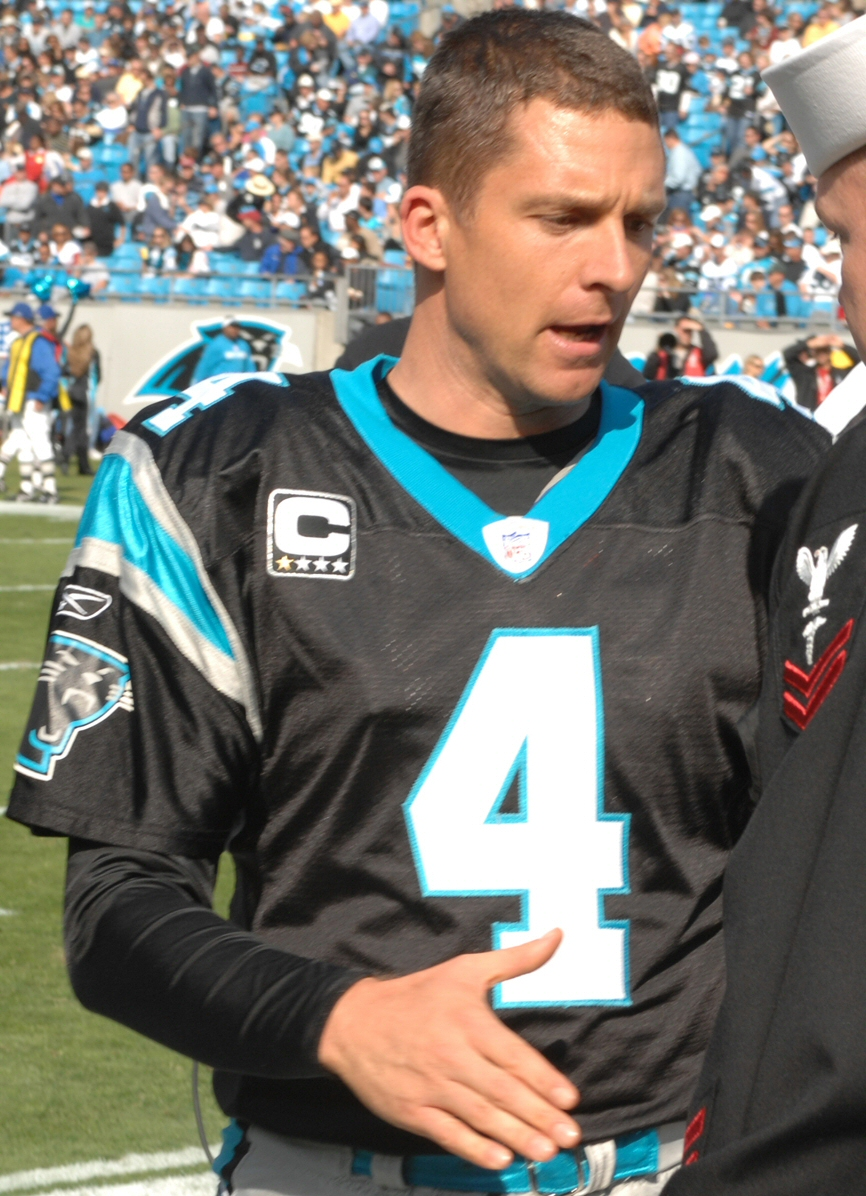
John Kasay, Panthers kicker from 1995 to 2010, holds the team's career points record.

Since they began playing football in 1995, the Panthers have been to four NFC Championship Games; they lost two (1996 and 2005) and won two (2003 and 2015). The Panthers have won seven division championships: the NFC West championship in 1996 and the NFC South championship in 2003, 2008, 2013, 2014, 2015, and 2025. They have qualified for the playoffs nine times, most recently in 2025, when they lost 34–31 to the Los Angeles Rams in the Wild Card Round.

== Team records ==
Kicker John Kasay is the team's career points leader. Kasay scored 1,482 points during his 16 seasons (1995–2010) with the Panthers. Quarterback Cam Newton is the Panthers' career passing leader; he threw for 29,725 yards during two stints with the team (2011–2019 and 2021). Running back Jonathan Stewart is the Panthers' career rushing leader; he rushed for 7,318 yards during his tenure with the team (2008–2017). Wide receiver Steve Smith, the team's career receiving leader, recorded 12,197 receiving yards during his 13-year tenure with the team (2001–2013).

Carolina Panthers all-time record through the 2025 season
	Regular season	Playoffs	Total
Record	227–273–1	9–9	236–282–1
Percentage	.454	.500	.456

== See also ==
- Carolina Panthers draft history
- Sports in North Carolina
