= Sir Purr =

Mascot for the NFL's Carolina Panthers

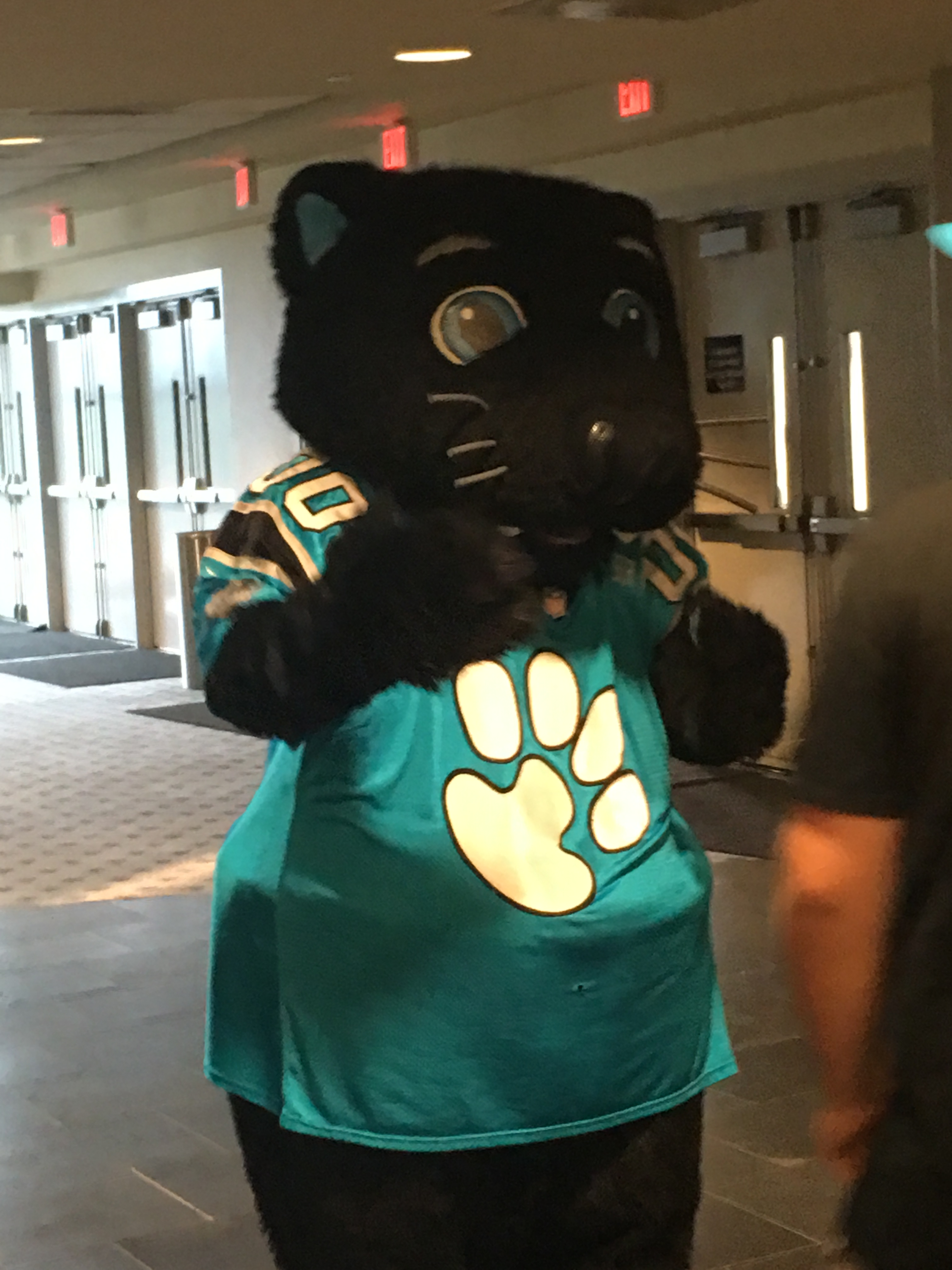
Sir Purr at the 2020 Carolina Panthers Fan Fest

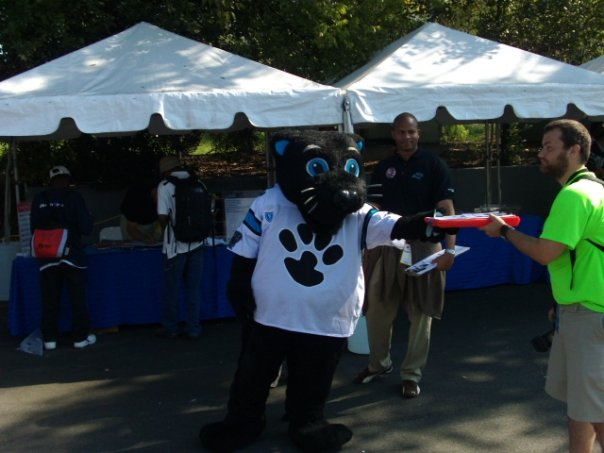
Sir Purr before a 2008 Panthers game

Sir Purr is the mascot of the Carolina Panthers of the National Football League. He is an anthropomorphized panther wearing a Panthers football jersey, Number 00. The character was introduced in 1995.

On his page at the Panthers' web site, he describes his favorites snacks as "birds like falcons and eagles and seahawks." He has a running rivalry with Jaxson de Ville, the mascot of the Jacksonville Jaguars (the Panthers' expansion brethren). Sir Purr also has family that occasionally joins him in games, such as Mini Meow, a younger version of Sir Purr.

He caused a stir in a 1996 game against the Pittsburgh Steelers; on a Panthers punt, he jumped on the ball even though it was a live ball, turning the play into a touchback. In 2020, Sir Purr made a number of headlines when Panthers wide receiver Robby Anderson mistook him for a bear. This created a running joke within the Panthers organization which is still referenced today in Sir Purr's Instagram bio.

== Charitable Outreach Programs ==
Sir Purr engages in a number of philanthropic ventures on behalf on the Panthers throughout North Carolina and South Carolina. These programs include the "Purr's Pals" program and the "Sack the Test” program. These ventures tend to be directed towards children due to Sir Purr's kid friendly appearance. Purr's Pals is a program that gives away tickets to Panther's home games to children through the Big Brother Big Sister organization. The Sack the Test program intends to prepare Carolinian kids for standardized testing.

== Alternative Outfits ==
Sir Purr has been seen in many outfits during his time as the Panthers' mascot. These include but are not limited to a Santa Claus suit, a camouflage military outfit, a suit resembling that of Uncle Sam, and a Fred Flintstone Halloween costume.
